= 1982 in Soviet football =

Football in the Soviet Union
- Season: 1982

Men's football
- Top League: Dinamo Minsk
- First League: Zhalgiris Vilnius
- Second League: Tekstilschik Ivanovo (Finals 1); Dnepr Mogilev (Finals 2); Kuzbass Kemerovo (Finals 3)
- Soviet Cup: Dinamo Kiev

The 1982 Soviet football championship was the 51st season of competitive football in the Soviet Union. Dinamo Minsk won the Top League championship, thereby becoming the Soviet domestic champions for the first time.

== Honours ==
Competition		Winner	Runner-up
Top League		Dinamo Minsk (1)	Dinamo Kiev
First League		Zhalgiris Vilnius (1)	Nistru Kishinev
Second League	Finals 1	Tekstilschik Ivanovo	Spartak Ordzhonikidze
Second League	Finals 2	Dnepr Mogilev	Dinamo Samarqand
Second League	Finals 3	Kuzbass Kemerovo	Shakhter Karaganda
Soviet Cup		Dinamo Kiev (6)	Torpedo Moscow

Notes = Number in parentheses is the times that club has won that honour. * indicates new record for competition

== Soviet Union football championship ==
=== Top League ===
Pos	Team	Pld	W	D	L	GF	GA	GD	Pts	Qualification or relegation
1	(Byelorussian Soviet Socialist Republic) Dinamo Minsk (C)	34	19	9	6	63	35	+28	47	Qualification for European Cup first round
2	(Ukrainian Soviet Socialist Republic) Dynamo Kyiv	34	18	10	6	58	25	+33	46	Qualification for UEFA Cup first round
3	(Russian Soviet Federative Socialist Republic) Spartak Moscow	34	16	9	9	59	35	+24	41	Qualification for UEFA Cup first round
4	(Georgian Soviet Socialist Republic) Dinamo Tbilisi	34	16	9	9	51	47	+4	41	
5	(Armenian Soviet Socialist Republic) Ararat Yerevan	34	14	10	10	50	47	+3	38	
6	(Uzbek Soviet Socialist Republic) Pakhtakor Tashkent	34	13	11	10	42	38	+4	36 (Note: 1 point deducted (10 draw limit))	
7	(Russian Soviet Federative Socialist Republic) Zenit Leningrad	34	12	9	13	44	41	+3	33	
8	(Russian Soviet Federative Socialist Republic) Torpedo Moscow	34	11	12	11	36	33	+3	32 (Note: 2 points deducted (10 draw limit))	
9	(Ukrainian Soviet Socialist Republic) Dnipro Dnipropetrovsk	34	11	12	11	34	38	−4	32	
10	(Ukrainian Soviet Socialist Republic) Chornomorets Odessa	34	11	11	12	30	36	−6	32	
11	(Russian Soviet Federative Socialist Republic) Dynamo Moscow	34	13	5	16	42	52	−10	31	
12	(Ukrainian Soviet Socialist Republic) Metalist Kharkiv	34	10	11	13	32	34	−2	30	
13	(Georgian Soviet Socialist Republic) Torpedo Kutaisi	34	10	10	14	39	45	−6	30	
14	(Ukrainian Soviet Socialist Republic) Shakhtar Donetsk	34	10	9	15	42	57	−15	29	Qualification for Cup Winners' Cup first round
15	(Russian Soviet Federative Socialist Republic) CSKA Moscow	34	10	9	15	41	46	−5	29	
16	(Azerbaijan Soviet Socialist Republic) Neftchi Baku	34	10	7	17	42	63	−21	27	
17	(Russian Soviet Federative Socialist Republic) Kuban Krasnodar (R)	34	9	9	16	37	48	−11	27	Relegation to First League
18	(Kazakh Soviet Socialist Republic) Kairat Alma-Ata (R)	34	7	10	17	34	56	−22	24	Relegation to First League

(C) Champions; (R) Relegated

=== First League ===
Pos	Team	Pld	W	D	L	GF	GA	GD	Pts	Promotion or relegation
1	(Lithuanian Soviet Socialist Republic) Žalgiris Vilnius (C, P)	42	23	10	9	65	34	+31	56	Promotion to Top League
2	(Moldavian Soviet Socialist Republic) Nistru Kishinev (P)	42	23	10	9	67	38	+29	56	Promotion to Top League
3	(Ukrainian Soviet Socialist Republic) Kolos Nikopol	42	22	11	9	63	38	+25	55	
4	(Russian Soviet Federative Socialist Republic) Lokomotiv Moscow	42	21	13	8	63	32	+31	54 (Note: There was a draw limit for the draws earned, 12. Only twelve draws earn a point, in contrast, over the limit draws earn no points.)	
5	(Russian Soviet Federative Socialist Republic) Fakel Voronezh	42	21	13	8	60	33	+27	54	
6	(Ukrainian Soviet Socialist Republic) Zarya Voroshilovgrad	42	19	9	14	65	52	+13	47	
7	(Russian Soviet Federative Socialist Republic) Shinnik Yaroslavl	42	19	7	16	59	58	+1	45	
8	(Latvian Soviet Socialist Republic) Daugava Riga	42	16	12	14	58	51	+7	44	
9	(Tajik Soviet Socialist Republic) Pamir Dushanbe	42	16	12	14	49	49	0	44	
10	(Ukrainian Soviet Socialist Republic) SKA Karpaty Lvov (Note: Karpaty Lvov merged with SKA Lvov into SKA-Karpaty.)	42	16	10	16	44	37	+7	42	
11	(Russian Soviet Federative Socialist Republic) SKA Rostov-on-Don	42	16	10	16	59	52	+7	42	
12	(Ukrainian Soviet Socialist Republic) Metallurg Zaporozhia	42	17	7	18	54	42	+12	41	
13	(Ukrainian Soviet Socialist Republic) Tavria Simferopol	42	17	7	18	58	50	+8	41	
14	(Russian Soviet Federative Socialist Republic) Rotor Volgograd	42	14	12	16	63	64	−1	40	
15	(Russian Soviet Federative Socialist Republic) Dinamo Kirov	42	15	8	19	45	57	−12	38	
16	(Russian Soviet Federative Socialist Republic) SKA Khabarovsk	42	14	10	18	34	48	−14	38	
17	(Russian Soviet Federative Socialist Republic) Iskra Smolensk	42	13	13	16	53	67	−14	38	
18	(Georgian Soviet Socialist Republic) Guria Lanchkhuti	42	15	7	20	48	67	−19	37	
19	(Uzbek Soviet Socialist Republic) Zvezda Dzhizak (Note: Zvezda Dzhizak was called Buston.)	42	14	9	19	56	77	−21	37	
20	(Ukrainian Soviet Socialist Republic) SKA Odessa (R)	42	11	13	18	40	48	−8	34	Relegation to Second League
21	(Ukrainian Soviet Socialist Republic) SKA Kiev (R)	42	5	10	27	31	81	−50	20	Relegation to Second League
22	(Russian Soviet Federative Socialist Republic) Spartak Kostroma (R)	42	4	9	29	18	77	−59	17	Relegation to Second League

Source: rsssf.com
(C) Champions; (P) Promoted; (R) Relegated

=== Match for 1st place ===
[Nov 16, Simferopol]

- Žalgiris 1-0 Nistru

=== Second League (finals) ===
[Oct 26 – Nov 19]

=== Finals 1 ===
Pos	Rep	Team	Pld	W	D	L	GF	GA	GD	Pts	Promotion
1	RUS	Textilshchik Ivanovo	4	2	1	1	5	4	+1	5	Promoted
2	RUS	Spartak Orjonikidze	4	1	2	1	5	4	+1	4	
3	ARM	Kotaik Abovyan	4	1	1	2	3	5	−2	3	

=== Finals 2 ===
Pos	Rep	Team	Pld	W	D	L	GF	GA	GD	Pts	Promotion
1	BLR	Dnepr Mogilyov	4	3	0	1	8	4	+4	6	Promoted
2	UZB	Dinamo Samarkand	4	2	0	2	8	7	+1	4	
3	UKR	Bukovina Chernovtsy	4	1	0	3	5	10	−5	2	

=== Finals 3 ===
Pos	Rep	Team	Pld	W	D	L	GF	GA	GD	Pts	Promotion
1	RUS	Kuzbass Kemerovo	4	3	1	0	9	3	+6	6 (Note: 1 point deducted?)	Promoted
2	KAZ	Shakhtyor Karaganda	4	1	1	2	4	5	−1	3	
3	RUS	Lokomotiv Chelyabinsk	4	1	0	3	2	7	−5	2	

Source: rsssf.com

=== Top goalscorers ===
Top League

- Andrei Yakubik (Pakhtakor Tashkent) – 23 goals

First League

- Georgiy Kolyadok (Kolos Nikopol) – 26 goals
