= 1981 in Soviet football =

Football in the Soviet Union
- Season: 1981

Men's football
- Top League: Dinamo Kiev
- First League: Metallist Kharkov
- Second League: Daugava Riga (Finals 1); Dinamo Kirov (Finals 2); Rotor Volgograd (Finals 3)
- Soviet Cup: SKA Rostov-na-Donu

The 1981 Soviet football championship was the 50th seasons of competitive football in the Soviet Union. Dinamo Kiev won the Top League championship becoming the Soviet domestic champions for the tenth time.

== Honours ==
| Competition | | Winner | Runner-up |
|---|---|---|---|
| Top League | | Dinamo Kiev (10) | Spartak Moscow |
| First League | | Metallist Kharkov (1) | Torpedo Kutaisi |
| Second League | Finals 1 | Daugava Riga | Kotayk Abovian |
| Second League | Finals 2 | Dynamo Kirov | Krivbass Krivoi Rog |
| Second League | Finals 3 | Rotor Volgograd | Dinamo Barnaul |
| Soviet Cup | | SKA Rostov-na-Donu (1) | Spartak Moscow |

Notes = Number in parentheses is the times that club has won that honour. * indicates new record for competition

== Soviet Union football championship ==
=== Top League ===
| Pos | Team | Pld | W | D | L | GF | GA | GD | Pts | Qualification or relegation |
|---|---|---|---|---|---|---|---|---|---|---|
| 1 | (Ukrainian Soviet Socialist Republic) Dynamo Kyiv (C) | 34 | 22 | 9 | 3 | 58 | 26 | +32 | 53 | Qualification for European Cup first round |
| 2 | (Russian Soviet Federative Socialist Republic) Spartak Moscow | 34 | 19 | 8 | 7 | 70 | 40 | +30 | 46 | Qualification for UEFA Cup first round |
| 3 | (Georgian Soviet Socialist Republic) Dinamo Tbilisi | 34 | 16 | 10 | 8 | 62 | 35 | +27 | 42 | Qualification for UEFA Cup first round |
| 4 | (Russian Soviet Federative Socialist Republic) Dynamo Moscow | 34 | 15 | 10 | 9 | 41 | 29 | +12 | 40 | Qualification for UEFA Cup first round |
| 5 | (Russian Soviet Federative Socialist Republic) Torpedo Moscow | 34 | 14 | 14 | 6 | 41 | 29 | +12 | 38 (Note: 4 points deducted (10 draw limit)) | Qualification for Cup Winners' Cup first round |
| 6 | (Russian Soviet Federative Socialist Republic) CSKA Moscow | 34 | 14 | 9 | 11 | 39 | 33 | +6 | 37 | |
| 7 | (Ukrainian Soviet Socialist Republic) Shakhtar Donetsk | 34 | 12 | 10 | 12 | 51 | 39 | +12 | 34 | |
| 8 | (Ukrainian Soviet Socialist Republic) Dnipro Dnipropetrovsk | 34 | 12 | 8 | 14 | 42 | 53 | −11 | 32 | |
| 9 | (Byelorussian Soviet Socialist Republic) Dinamo Minsk | 34 | 11 | 13 | 10 | 44 | 39 | +5 | 32 (Note: 3 points deducted (10 draw limit)) | |
| 10 | (Azerbaijan Soviet Socialist Republic) Neftchi Baku | 34 | 11 | 12 | 11 | 34 | 49 | −15 | 32 (Note: 2 points deducted (10 draw limit)) | |
| 11 | (Ukrainian Soviet Socialist Republic) Chornomorets Odessa | 34 | 11 | 9 | 14 | 36 | 44 | −8 | 31 | |
| 12 | (Kazakh Soviet Socialist Republic) Kairat Alma-Ata | 34 | 10 | 12 | 12 | 42 | 46 | −4 | 30 | |
| 13 | (Russian Soviet Federative Socialist Republic) Kuban Krasnodar | 34 | 11 | 7 | 16 | 42 | 54 | −12 | 29 | |
| 14 | (Armenian Soviet Socialist Republic) Ararat Yerevan | 34 | 10 | 9 | 15 | 44 | 50 | −6 | 29 | |
| 15 | (Russian Soviet Federative Socialist Republic) Zenit Leningrad | 34 | 9 | 10 | 15 | 33 | 43 | −10 | 28 | |
| 16 | (Russian Soviet Federative Socialist Republic) SKA Rostov-on-Don (R) | 34 | 8 | 10 | 16 | 39 | 58 | −19 | 26 | Relegation to First League |
| 17 | (Ukrainian Soviet Socialist Republic) Tavria Simferopol (R) | 34 | 8 | 7 | 19 | 27 | 54 | −27 | 23 | Relegation to First League |
| 18 | (Uzbek Soviet Socialist Republic) Pakhtakor Tashkent (Note: Pakhtakor Tashkent avoided relegation as it received a three year guarantee of no relegation after the 1979 airplane crash.) | 34 | 7 | 5 | 22 | 34 | 58 | −24 | 19 | |

(C) Champions; (R) Relegated

=== First League ===
| Pos | Team | Pld | W | D | L | GF | GA | GD | Pts | Promotion or relegation |
|---|---|---|---|---|---|---|---|---|---|---|
| 1 | (Ukrainian Soviet Socialist Republic) Metalist Kharkiv (C, P) | 46 | 25 | 12 | 9 | 68 | 33 | +35 | 62 | Promotion to Top League |
| 2 | (Georgian Soviet Socialist Republic) Torpedo Kutaisi (P) | 46 | 26 | 4 | 16 | 57 | 46 | +11 | 56 | Promotion to Top League |
| 3 | (Russian Soviet Federative Socialist Republic) Lokomotiv Moscow | 46 | 21 | 15 | 10 | 65 | 41 | +24 | 54 (Note: There was a draw limit for the draws earned, 12. Only twelve draws earn a point, in contrast, over the limit draws earn no points.) | |
| 4 | (Russian Soviet Federative Socialist Republic) Shinnik Yaroslavl | 46 | 21 | 10 | 15 | 68 | 58 | +10 | 52 | |
| 5 | (Ukrainian Soviet Socialist Republic) Kolos Nikopol | 46 | 20 | 11 | 15 | 68 | 53 | +15 | 51 | |
| 6 | (Lithuanian Soviet Socialist Republic) Žalgiris Vilnius | 46 | 17 | 15 | 14 | 48 | 39 | +9 | 46 | |
| 7 | (Russian Soviet Federative Socialist Republic) Iskra Smolensk | 46 | 17 | 12 | 17 | 48 | 45 | +3 | 46 | |
| 8 | (Moldavian Soviet Socialist Republic) Nistru Kishinev | 46 | 17 | 12 | 17 | 54 | 51 | +3 | 46 | |
| 9 | (Tajik Soviet Socialist Republic) Pamir Dushanbe | 46 | 17 | 11 | 18 | 52 | 54 | −2 | 45 | |
| 10 | (Russian Soviet Federative Socialist Republic) Fakel Voronezh | 46 | 17 | 10 | 19 | 45 | 44 | +1 | 44 | |
| 11 | (Ukrainian Soviet Socialist Republic) Karpaty Lvov | 46 | 17 | 10 | 19 | 57 | 60 | −3 | 44 | |
| 12 | (Russian Soviet Federative Socialist Republic) Spartak Kostroma | 46 | 16 | 16 | 14 | 49 | 50 | −1 | 44 | |
| 13 | (Ukrainian Soviet Socialist Republic) Metallurg Zaporozhia | 46 | 16 | 14 | 16 | 57 | 51 | +6 | 44 | |
| 14 | (Georgian Soviet Socialist Republic) Guria Lanchkhuti | 46 | 16 | 13 | 17 | 50 | 56 | −6 | 44 | |
| 15 | (Ukrainian Soviet Socialist Republic) Zarya Voroshilovgrad | 46 | 16 | 13 | 17 | 44 | 53 | −9 | 44 | |
| 16 | (Ukrainian Soviet Socialist Republic) SKA Odessa | 46 | 16 | 13 | 17 | 62 | 54 | +8 | 44 | |
| 17 | (Ukrainian Soviet Socialist Republic) SKA Kiev | 46 | 16 | 10 | 20 | 59 | 71 | −12 | 42 | |
| 18 | (Uzbek Soviet Socialist Republic) Buston Dzhizak | 46 | 16 | 9 | 21 | 47 | 63 | −16 | 41 | |
| 19 | (Russian Soviet Federative Socialist Republic) SKA Khabarovsk | 46 | 16 | 8 | 22 | 50 | 58 | −8 | 40 | |
| 20 | (Ukrainian Soviet Socialist Republic) Prykarpattia Ivano-Frankivsk (Note: Prykarpattia Ivano-Frankivsk was called Spartak.) (R) | 46 | 14 | 13 | 19 | 44 | 56 | −12 | 40 | Relegation to Second League |
| 21 | (Russian Soviet Federative Socialist Republic) Spartak Ordjonikidze (R) | 46 | 14 | 12 | 20 | 36 | 49 | −13 | 40 | Relegation to Second League |
| 22 | (Russian Soviet Federative Socialist Republic) Kuzbass Kemerovo (R) | 46 | 14 | 12 | 20 | 47 | 51 | −4 | 40 | Relegation to Second League |
| 23 | (Russian Soviet Federative Socialist Republic) Dinamo Stavropol (R) | 46 | 13 | 14 | 19 | 45 | 60 | −15 | 38 | Relegation to Second League |
| 24 | (Kazakh Soviet Socialist Republic) Traktor Pavlodar (R) | 46 | 12 | 15 | 19 | 41 | 65 | −24 | 36 | Relegation to Second League |

Source: rsssf.com
(C) Champions; (P) Promoted; (R) Relegated

=== Second League (finals) ===
[Oct 26 – Nov 12]

=== Finals 1 ===
| Pos | Rep | Team | Pld | W | D | L | GF | GA | GD | Pts | Promotion |
|---|---|---|---|---|---|---|---|---|---|---|---|
| 1 | LVA | Daugava Riga | 4 | 3 | 0 | 1 | 11 | 5 | +6 | 6 | Promoted |
| 2 | ARM | Kotaik Abovyan | 4 | 2 | 0 | 2 | 7 | 9 | −2 | 4 | |
| 3 | UZB | Neftyanik Fergana | 4 | 1 | 0 | 3 | 3 | 7 | −4 | 2 | |

=== Finals 2 ===
| Pos | Rep | Team | Pld | W | D | L | GF | GA | GD | Pts | Promotion |
|---|---|---|---|---|---|---|---|---|---|---|---|
| 1 | RUS | Dinamo Kirov | 4 | 3 | 0 | 1 | 9 | 4 | +5 | 6 | Promoted |
| 2 | UKR | Krivbass Krivoi Rog | 4 | 3 | 0 | 1 | 10 | 6 | +4 | 6 | |
| 3 | KAZ | Aktyubinets Aktyubinsk | 4 | 0 | 0 | 4 | 3 | 12 | −9 | 0 | |

=== Finals 3 ===
| Pos | Rep | Team | Pld | W | D | L | GF | GA | GD | Pts | Promotion |
|---|---|---|---|---|---|---|---|---|---|---|---|
| 1 | RUS | Rotor Volgograd | 4 | 3 | 0 | 1 | 7 | 4 | +3 | 6 | Promoted |
| 2 | RUS | Dinamo Barnaul | 4 | 1 | 1 | 2 | 5 | 7 | −2 | 3 | |
| 3 | RUS | Textilshchik Ivanovo | 4 | 1 | 1 | 2 | 4 | 5 | −1 | 3 | |

Source: rsssf.com

=== Top goalscorers ===
Top League

- Ramaz Shengelia (Dinamo Tbilisi) – 23 goals

First League

- Ravil Sharipov (Metallurg Zaporozhye) – 26 goals
