= 1983 in Soviet football =

Football in the Soviet Union
- Season: 1983

Men's football
- Top League: Dnepr Dnepropetrovsk
- First League: Kairat Alma-Ata
- Second League: Irtysh Omsk (Finals 1); Spartak Ordzhonikidze (Finals 2); Dinamo Batumi (Finals 3)
- Soviet Cup: Shakhter Donetsk

The 1983 Soviet football championship was the 52nd seasons of competitive football in the Soviet Union. Dnepr Dnepropetrovsk won the Top League championship becoming the Soviet domestic champions for the first time.

== Honours ==
Competition		Winner	Runner-up
Top League		Dnepr Dnepropetrovsk (1)	Spartak Moscow
First League		Kairat Alma-Ata (2)	SKA Rostov-na-Donu
Second League	Finals 1	Irtysh Omsk	Metallurg Lipetsk
Second League	Finals 2	Spartak Ordzhonikidze	Znamya Truda Orekhovo-Zuyevo
Second League	Finals 3	Dinamo Batumi	Krylia Sovetov Kuibyshev
Soviet Cup		Shakhtar Donetsk (4)	Metallist Kharkov

Notes = Number in parentheses is the times that club has won that honour. * indicates new record for competition

== Soviet Union football championship ==
=== Top League ===
Pos	Team	Pld	W	D	L	GF	GA	GD	Pts	Qualification
1	(Ukrainian Soviet Socialist Republic) Dnipro Dnipropetrovsk (C)	34	22	5	7	63	36	+27	49	Qualification for European Cup first round
2	(Russian Soviet Federative Socialist Republic) Spartak Moscow	34	18	9	7	60	25	+35	45	Qualification for UEFA Cup first round
3	(Byelorussian Soviet Socialist Republic) Dinamo Minsk	34	17	9	8	51	34	+17	43	Qualification for UEFA Cup first round
4	(Russian Soviet Federative Socialist Republic) Zenit Leningrad	34	15	11	8	42	32	+10	40 (Note: 1 point deducted (10 draw limit))	
5	(Lithuanian Soviet Socialist Republic) Žalgiris Vilnius	34	15	9	10	38	36	+2	39	
6	(Russian Soviet Federative Socialist Republic) Torpedo Moscow	34	14	11	9	40	34	+6	38	
7	(Ukrainian Soviet Socialist Republic) Dynamo Kyiv	34	14	10	10	50	34	+16	38	
8	(Ukrainian Soviet Socialist Republic) Chornomorets Odessa	34	16	5	13	44	46	−2	37	
9	(Ukrainian Soviet Socialist Republic) Shakhtar Donetsk	34	16	5	13	48	40	+8	37	
10	(Uzbek Soviet Socialist Republic) Pakhtakor Tashkent	34	13	9	12	37	34	+3	35	
11	(Ukrainian Soviet Socialist Republic) Metalist Kharkiv	34	12	8	14	38	40	−2	32	
12	(Russian Soviet Federative Socialist Republic) CSKA Moscow	34	11	12	11	37	33	+4	32 (Note: 2 points deducted (10 draw limit))	
13	(Azerbaijan Soviet Socialist Republic) Neftchi Baku	34	10	10	14	32	38	−6	30	
14	(Armenian Soviet Socialist Republic) Ararat Yerevan	34	11	7	16	29	47	−18	29	
15	(Russian Soviet Federative Socialist Republic) Dynamo Moscow	34	9	11	14	30	37	−7	28	Qualification for Cup Winners' Cup first round
16	(Georgian Soviet Socialist Republic) Dinamo Tbilisi	34	9	9	16	41	48	−7	27	
17	(Georgian Soviet Socialist Republic) Torpedo Kutaisi (R)	34	4	10	20	26	58	−32	18	Relegation to First League
18	(Moldavian Soviet Socialist Republic) Nistru Kishinev (R)	34	3	4	27	19	73	−54	10	Relegation to First League

(C) Champions; (R) Relegated

=== First League ===
Pos	Team	Pld	W	D	L	GF	GA	GD	Pts	Promotion or relegation
1	(Kazakh Soviet Socialist Republic) Kairat Almaty (C, P)	42	25	10	7	78	36	+42	60	Promotion to Top League
2	(Russian Soviet Federative Socialist Republic) SKA Rostov-on-Don (P)	42	23	13	6	73	36	+37	58 (Note: There was a draw limit for the draws earned, 12. Only twelve draws earn a point, in contrast, over the limit draws earn no points.)	Promotion to Top League
3	(Russian Soviet Federative Socialist Republic) Fakel Voronezh	42	21	12	9	53	30	+23	54	
4	(Russian Soviet Federative Socialist Republic) Rotor Volgograd	42	23	5	14	62	48	+14	51	
5	(Ukrainian Soviet Socialist Republic) Metallurg Zaporozhia	42	21	8	13	66	46	+20	50	
6	(Ukrainian Soviet Socialist Republic) Kolos Nikopol	42	18	12	12	69	52	+17	48	
7	(Ukrainian Soviet Socialist Republic) Tavria Simferopol	42	16	12	14	78	67	+11	44	
8	(Russian Soviet Federative Socialist Republic) Kuban Krasnodar	42	16	11	15	58	48	+10	43	
9	(Georgian Soviet Socialist Republic) Guria Lanchkhuti	42	19	4	19	52	71	−19	42	
10	(Russian Soviet Federative Socialist Republic) Kuzbass Kemerovo	42	15	13	14	50	49	+1	42	
11	(Ukrainian Soviet Socialist Republic) SKA Karpaty Lvov	42	15	12	15	43	46	−3	42	
12	(Tajik Soviet Socialist Republic) Pamir Dushanbe	42	15	10	17	46	55	−9	40	
13	(Ukrainian Soviet Socialist Republic) Zarya Voroshilovgrad	42	14	11	17	66	67	−1	39	
14	(Latvian Soviet Socialist Republic) Daugava Riga	42	14	10	18	57	63	−6	38	
15	(Russian Soviet Federative Socialist Republic) Lokomotiv Moscow	42	13	13	16	51	47	+4	38	
16	(Uzbek Soviet Socialist Republic) Zvezda Dzhizak	42	13	12	17	62	64	−2	38	
17	(Russian Soviet Federative Socialist Republic) Iskra Smolensk	42	14	9	19	51	47	+4	37	
18	(Russian Soviet Federative Socialist Republic) Shinnik Yaroslavl	42	13	11	18	45	75	−30	37	
19	(Russian Soviet Federative Socialist Republic) SKA Khabarovsk	42	12	12	18	33	54	−21	36	
20	(Byelorussian Soviet Socialist Republic) Dnepr Mogilev (R)	42	12	13	17	40	60	−20	36	Relegation to Second League
21	(Russian Soviet Federative Socialist Republic) Textilshchik Ivanovo (R)	42	8	10	24	45	83	−38	26	Relegation to Second League
22	(Russian Soviet Federative Socialist Republic) Dinamo Kirov (R)	42	5	11	26	29	63	−34	21	Relegation to Second League

Source: rsssf.com
(C) Champions; (P) Promoted; (R) Relegated

=== Second League (finals) ===
[Oct 23 – Nov 12]

=== Finals 1 ===
Pos	Rep	Team	Pld	W	D	L	GF	GA	GD	Pts	Promotion
1	RUS	Irtysh Omsk	4	3	0	1	6	2	+4	6	Promoted
2	RUS	Metallurg Lipetsk	4	2	0	2	4	7	−3	4	
3	UKR	SKA Kiev	4	1	0	3	6	7	−1	2	

=== Finals 2 ===
Pos	Rep	Team	Pld	W	D	L	GF	GA	GD	Pts	Promotion
1	RUS	Spartak Orjonikidze	4	1	3	0	2	0	+2	5	Promoted
2	RUS	Znamya Truda Orekhovo-Zuyevo	4	1	2	1	2	3	−1	4	
3	KAZ	Shakhtyor Karaganda	4	1	1	2	3	4	−1	3	

=== Finals 3 ===
Pos	Rep	Team	Pld	W	D	L	GF	GA	GD	Pts	Promotion
1	GEO	Dinamo Batumi	4	2	1	1	4	1	+3	5	Promoted
2	RUS	Krylya Sovetov Kuibyshev	4	2	1	1	3	3	0	5	
3	UZB	Neftyanik Fergana	4	0	2	2	1	4	−3	2	

Source: rsssf.com

=== Top goalscorers ===
Top League

- Yuri Gavrilov (Spartak Moscow) – 18 goals

First League

- Yuriy Bondarenko (Tavriya Simferopol) – 25 goals
