= 1982 Soviet Cup final =

- Event: 1982 Soviet Cup
Torpedo Moscow	Dynamo Kyiv
0	1
- Date: 9 May 1982
- Venue: Tsentralny Stadion imeni Lenina, Moscow
- Referee: Romualdas Juška (Vilnius)
- Attendance: 51,200

The 1982 Soviet Cup final was a football match that took place at the Lenin's Central Stadium, Moscow on 9 May 1982. The match was the 41st Soviet Cup final and it was contested by Dynamo Kyiv and Torpedo Moscow.

Sergei Baltacha scored the only goal of the match after 34 minutes as Dynamo Kyiv won the competition for the sixth time. It was the 10th time that a team from the Ukrainian Soviet Socialist Republic had won the cup and the eighth time in 10 seasons in which a team from outside the Russian Soviet Federative Socialist Republic won the competition.

As Dynamo Kyiv also won the 1981 Soviet Top League, Torpedo Moscow qualified to represent the Soviet Union in the 1982–83 European Cup Winners' Cup.

== Background ==
Dynamo Kyiv had reached the Soviet Cup final on six previous occasions, winning the trophy five times (in 1954, 1964, 1966, 1974 and 1978). They were the most successful team from the Ukrainian Soviet Socialist Republic in the history of the competition.

Torpedo Moscow had reached the final on 10 previous occasions, winning the trophy five times (in 1949, 1952, 1960, 1978 and 1972).

The two teams had met once before in the final of the competition – Dynamo Kyiv winning 2–0 in 1966.

In the previous nine seasons, Ararat Yerevan (2), Dynamo Kyiv (2), Dinamo Tbilisi (2) and Shakhtar Donetsk (1) had all won the cup from outside the Russian Soviet Federative Socialist Republic. Dynamo Moscow's triumph in 1977 and Rostov-on-Don's win in 1981 were the only wins by Russian sides in that time.

== Road to Moscow ==
Unlike other clubs, Dynamo Kyiv was allowed to enter the tournament starting in the quarter-finals.

Note: In all results below, the score of the finalist is given first (H: home; A: away).

Torpedo Moscow		Round	Dynamo Kyiv	
Opponent	Result	Group stage	Opponent	Result
Fakel Voronezh	0–1 (A)	Matchday 1		
Shinnik Yaroslavl	1–0 (H)	Matchday 2		
Guria Lanchkhuti	1–0 (H)	Matchday 3		
Shakhtar Donetsk	3–1 (H)	Matchday 4		
Dynamo Moscow	2–0 (H)	Matchday 5		
Pos / Team / Pld / Pts; 1 / Fakel Voronezh / 5 / 8; 2 / Torpedo Moscow / 5 / 8; 3 / Dynamo Moscow / 5 / 8; 4 / Shakhtar Donetsk / 5 / 4; 5 / Guria Lanchkhuti / 5 / 1; 6 / Shinnik Yaroslavl / 5 / 1		Final standings		
Opponent	Result	Knockout stage	Opponent	Result
Daugava Riga	1–0 (H)	Round of 16		
Pakhtakor Tashkent	1–1 (a.e.t.) (6–5 p) (A)	Quarter-finals	Dinamo Minsk	1–0 (H)
Dnipro Dnipropetrovsk	2–0 (A)	Semi-finals	Dinamo Tbilisi	2–0 (H)

== Match details ==
9 May 1982

Torpedo Moscow	0–1	Dynamo Kyiv
		Baltacha 34'

Tsentralny Stadion imeni Lenina, Moscow
Attendance: 51,200
Referee: Romualdas Juška (Vilnius)

Torpedo Moscow:
GK	(Russian Soviet Federative Socialist Republic) Vyacheslav Chanov
DF	(Russian Soviet Federative Socialist Republic) Sergei Prigoda
DF	(Russian Soviet Federative Socialist Republic) Vladimir Pivtsov	Yellow card
DF	(Russian Soviet Federative Socialist Republic) Aleksandr Gostenin
DF	(Russian Soviet Federative Socialist Republic) Valery Shaveyko	(substituted off) 25'
MF	(Russian Soviet Federative Socialist Republic) Aleksandr Polukarov
MF	(Russian Soviet Federative Socialist Republic) Valery Petrakov
MF	(Ukrainian Soviet Socialist Republic) Anatoliy Radenko
MF	(Russian Soviet Federative Socialist Republic) Vladimir Galayba	(substituted off) 60'
MF	(Russian Soviet Federative Socialist Republic) Yuri Susloparov
FW	(Russian Soviet Federative Socialist Republic) Andrei Redkous	(substituted off) 79'
Substitutes:
MF	(Russian Soviet Federative Socialist Republic) Anatoliy Solovyov	(substituted on) 25'	Yellow card
MF	(Russian Soviet Federative Socialist Republic) Sergei Petrenko	(substituted on) 60'
FW	(Russian Soviet Federative Socialist Republic) Nikolai Vasilyev	(substituted on) 79'
Manager:
(Russian Soviet Federative Socialist Republic) Valentin Ivanov

Dynamo Kiev:
GK	(Ukrainian Soviet Socialist Republic) Viktor Chanov
DF	(Ukrainian Soviet Socialist Republic) Oleksandr Sorokalet
DF	(Ukrainian Soviet Socialist Republic) Sergei Baltacha
DF	(Ukrainian Soviet Socialist Republic) Serhiy Zhuravlyov
DF	(Ukrainian Soviet Socialist Republic) Anatoliy Demyanenko
DF	(Ukrainian Soviet Socialist Republic) Volodymyr Lozynskyi
MF	(Ukrainian Soviet Socialist Republic) Leonid Buryak	(substituted off) 90'
MF	(Ukrainian Soviet Socialist Republic) Andriy Bal
MF	(Ukrainian Soviet Socialist Republic) Vadym Yevtushenko	Yellow card
MF	(Ukrainian Soviet Socialist Republic) Volodymyr Veremeyev	(substituted off) 46'
FW	(Ukrainian Soviet Socialist Republic) Oleh Blokhin	(substituted off) 86'
Substitutes:
MF	(Ukrainian Soviet Socialist Republic) Oleksandr Boiko	(substituted on) 46'
FW	(Ukrainian Soviet Socialist Republic) Viktor Khlus	(substituted on) 86'
MF	(Ukrainian Soviet Socialist Republic) Yaroslav Dumanskyi	(substituted on) 90'
Manager:
(Ukrainian Soviet Socialist Republic) Valeriy Lobanovskyi

MATCH OFFICIALS

- Assistant referees:
  - I.Mulyolis (Vilnius)
  - V.Braun (Riga)
- Fourth official:( )

MATCH RULES

- 90 minutes.
- 30 minutes of extra-time if necessary.
- Penalty shoot-out if scores still level.
- Seven named substitutes
- Maximum of 3 substitutions.

== Aftermath ==
As Dynamo Kyiv had won the 1981 Soviet Top League and qualified to compete in the 1982–83 European Cup, Torpedo Moscow represented the Soviet Union in the 1982–83 European Cup Winners' Cup. They were eliminated in the first round on away goals after drawing 1–1 on aggregate with Bayern Munich of West Germany.

== See also ==
- 1982 Soviet Top League
- 1982 Soviet First League
- 1982 Soviet Second League
