= List of FC Zorya Luhansk seasons =

== Soviet Union ==
Season	Div.	Pos.	Pl.	W	D	L	GS	GA	P	Domestic Cup	Europe		Notes
1928	2nd (Ukraine)	1/16 finals	2	1	0	1	1	8	2				as Luhansk
1935	4th (Ukraine. Tretya Hrupa)	1	3	3	0	0	11	2	6				as Luhansk
1936	4th (Ukraine. Druha Hrupa)	1/2 finals	2	1	0	1	4	7	2				as Voroshilovgrad
Dzerzhynets Voroshilovgrad / Dzerzhinets Voroshilovgrad, Trudovi Rezervy Voroshilovgrad (from 1950)
1937	4th (Ukraine. Druha Hrupa)	1	5	4	1	0	21	6	14				
1938	3rd (Ukraine)	1	11	9	2	0	27	9	31				Champions of Ukraine
1939	2nd (Gruppa B)	16	22	8	3	11	37	51	19				
1940	3rd (Ukraine)	5	5	2	2	1	7	6	11				
World War II; club idle
1948	3rd (Ukraine)	3							3				
1949	Did not participate												
1950	4th (Ukraine. 2 Hrupa)	2	3	2	0	1	4	5	4				
1951	4th (Ukraine. 1 Hrupa)	6	6	0	3	3	6	14	3				
1952	3rd (Ukraine)	6	22	7	8	7	53	38	22				
1953	Did not participate												
Avanhard Voroshilovgrad / Avangard Voroshilovgrad
1954	3rd (Ukraine)	5	10	3	1	6	13	21	7				
1955	3rd (Ukraine)	6	14	3	5	6	18	33	11				
1956	3rd (Ukraine)	6	14	5	2	7	17	30	12				
1957	3rd (Ukraine)	6	10	1	1	8	6	28	3				
1958	3rd (Ukraine)	8	14	1	3	10	19	51	5				On 5 March 1958 old name of Luhansk was reinstated
1959	3rd (Ukraine)	5	14	5	1	8	16	29	11				
club idle
FC Trudovi Rezervy Luhansk merged with amateur SC Zorya (former Avanhard) under name Zorya Luhansk
Zorya Luhansk/ Zaria Luhansk
1964	2nd (Klass A. Vtoraya gruppa)	4	24	9	10	5	25	14	28	1/16 finals			
1964	2nd (Klass A. Vtoraya gruppa)	11	14	3	6	5	9	10	12	1/16 finals			Places 1-14 group
1965	2nd (Klass A. Vtoraya gruppa)	2	30	14	12	4	36	23	40	1/64 finals			
1965	2nd (Klass A. Vtoraya gruppa)	7	16	8	3	5	23	15	19	1/64 finals			Places 1-16 group
1966	2nd (Klass A. Vtoraya gruppa)	1	34	16	12	6	33	15	44	1/64 finals			
1966	2nd (Klass A. Vtoraya gruppa)	1	4	2	2	0	4	1	6	1/64 finals			Final group; Promoted
1967	1st (Klass A. Pervaya gruppa)	16	36	8	13	15	27	42	29	1/16 finals			
1968	1st (Klass A. Pervaya gruppa)	13	38	10	13	15	23	41	33	1/4 finals			
1969	1st (Klass A. Pervaya gruppa)	5	18	6	5	7	19	16	17	1/16 finals			2 December 1969 the city's name was changed again to Voroshilovgrad
1969	1st (Klass A. Pervaya gruppa)	11	14	2	5	7	9	17	9	1/16 finals			Places 1-14 group
1970	1st (Klass A. Vysshaya gruppa)	5	32	10	14	8	27	25	34	1/8 finals			
1971	1st (Vysshaya Liga)	4	30	11	11	8	29	23	33	1/8 finals			
1972	1st (Vysshaya Liga)	1	30	15	10	5	52	30	40	1/16 finals			
1973	1st (Vysshaya Liga)	7	30	14	1	15	38	26	29	1/4 finals	EC	R16	
1974	1st (Vysshaya Liga)	14	30	8	10	12	32	41	26	Runner-up			
1975	1st (Vysshaya Liga)	9	30	10	11	9	32	37	31	Runner-up			
1976 Spring	1st (Vysshaya Liga)	16	15	2	4	9	9	24	8	1/8 finals			
1976 Autumn	1st (Vysshaya Liga)	12	15	6	2	7	12	17	14	1/8 finals			
1977	1st (Vysshaya Liga)	9	30	8	12	10	28	24	26	1/2 finals			
1978	1st (Vysshaya Liga)	9	30	9	8	13	38	44	26	1/8 finals			
1979	1st (Vysshaya Liga)	17	34	6	11	17	41	62	20	Group stage			Relegated
1980	2nd (Pervaya Liga)	10	46	19	8	19	68	60	46	Group stage			
1981	2nd (Pervaya Liga)	15	46	16	13	17	44	53	44	Group stage			
1982	2nd (Pervaya Liga)	6	42	19	9	14	65	52	47	Group stage			
1983	2nd (Pervaya Liga)	13	42	14	11	17	66	67	39	1/32 finals			
1984	2nd (Pervaya Liga)	20	42	13	11	18	54	61	37	1/32 finals			Relegated
1985	3rd (Vtoraya Liga, VI Zona)	6	26	11	7	8	37	25	29	1/64 finals			
1985	3rd (Vtoraya Liga, VI Zona)	13	14	3	3	8	9	15	9	1/64 finals			Ukrainian Championship
1986	3rd (Vtoraya Liga, VI Zona)	2	26	13	8	5	40	26	34	1/64 finals			
1986	3rd (Vtoraya Liga, VI Zona)	1	14	12	2	0	29	9	26	1/64 finals			Ukrainian Champions
1986	3rd (Vtoraya Liga, VI Zona)	1	3	2	0	1	8	5	4	1/64 finals			Promoted
1987	2nd (Pervaya Liga)	16	42	13	15	14	46	60	38	1/64 finals			
1988	2nd (Pervaya Liga)	20	42	11	10	21	44	59	32	1/64 finals			Relegated
1989	3rd (Vtoraya Liga, VI Zona)	4	52	27	14	11	94	59	68	1/64 finals			Ukrainian Championship
1990	3rd (Vtoraya Liga, VI Zona)	7	42	20	9	13	72	44	49	1/32 finals			4 May 1990 the city's name was changed again to Luhansk
1991	3rd (Vtoraya Liga, VI Zona)	2	42	26	5	11	69	34	57	1/64 finals			
1992	3rd (Vtoraya Liga, VI Zona)	withdrew from competitions								1/32 finals			

=== Ukrainian competitions ===
Season	Div.	Pos.	Pl.	W	D	L	GS	GA	P	Domestic Cup	Europe		Notes
1992	1st (Vyshcha Liha)	12	18	6	5	7	23	23	17	1/16 finals	-	-	-
1992–93	1st (Vyshcha Liha)	15	30	10	4	16	26	46	24	1/8 finals	-	-	-
1993–94	1st (Vyshcha Liha)	14	34	10	5	18	24	46	26	1/8 finals	-	-	-
1994–95	1st (Vyshcha Liha)	16	34	10	5	19	35	70	35	1/16 finals	-	-	-
1995–96	1st (Vyshcha Liha)	18	34	4	4	26	16	80	16	1/16 finals	-	-	Relegated
1996–97	2nd (Persha Liha)	20	42	11	6	25	43	84	39	1/32 finals 2nd Stage	-	-	-
1997–98	2nd (Persha Liha)	19	46	16	5	25	58	84	53	1/32 finals	-	-	Relegated
1998–99	3rd (Druha Liha, Hrupa V)	2	26	18	2	6	55	17	56	1/32 finals	-	-	-
1999–00	3rd (Druha Liha, Hrupa V)	3	26	17	2	7	42	21	53	1/8 finals 2nd League Cup	-	-	-
2000–01	3rd (Druha Liha, Hrupa V)	5	30	15	5	10	49	35	50	1/8 finals 2nd League Cup	-	-	-
2001–02	3rd (Druha Liha, Hrupa V)	9	34	15	6	13	61	51	51	Round 1	-	-	-
2002–03	3rd (Druha Liha, Hrupa V)	1	28	23	2	3	62	17	71	1/32 finals	-	-	Promoted
2003–04	2nd (Persha Liha)	15	34	8	13	13	28	42	37	1/16 finals	-	-	-
2004–05	2nd (Persha Liha)	3	34	19	9	6	54	21	66	1/16 finals	-	-	-
2005–06	2nd (Persha Liha)	1	34	27	6	1	74	13	87	1/32 finals (forfeit)	-	-	Promoted
2006–07	1st (Vyshcha Liha)	11	30	9	7	14	23	43	34	1/16 finals	-	-	-
2007–08	1st (Vyshcha Liha)	11	30	9	4	17	24	43	34	1/16 finals	-	-	-
2008–09	1st (Premier Liha)	13	30	8	7	15	29	45	31	1/8 finals	-	-	-
2009–10	1st (Premier Liha)	13	30	7	7	16	23	47	28	1/16 finals	-	-	-
2010–11	1st (Premier Liha)	12	30	7	9	14	28	40	30	1/4 finals	-	-	-
2011–12	1st (Premier Liha)	13	30	6	8	16	34	58	26	1/4 finals	-	-	-
2012–13	1st (Premier Liha)	10	30	10	7	13	32	43	37	1/16 finals	-	-	-
2013–14	1st (Premier Liha)	7	28	11	9	8	35	30	42	1/16 finals	-	-	-
2014–15	1st (Premier Liha)	4	26	13	6	7	40	31	42	1/8 finals	EL	Play-off round	-
2015–16	1st (Premier Liha)	4	26	14	6	6	51	26	48	Runners up	EL	Play-off round	-
2016–17	1st (Premier Liha)	3	32	16	6	10	45	31	54	1/8 finals	EL	Group stage	-
2017–18	1st (Premier Liha)	4	32	11	10	11	44	44	43	1/8 finals	EL	Group stage	-
2018–19	1st (Premier Liha)	5	32	11	10	11	39	34	43	1/2 finals	EL	Play-off round	-
2019–20	1st (Premier Liha)	3	32	17	7	8	50	29	58	1/8 finals	EL	Play-off round	-
2020–21	1st (Premier Liha)	3	26	15	5	6	44	22	50	Runners-up	EL	Group stage	-
2021–22 was terminated	1st (Premier Liha)	4 (after 18/30)	18	11	3	4	37	19	36	Not played after Round of 16	EL	Play-off round	began on 24.02.2022 Russian invasion of Ukraine
2022–23	1st (Premier Liha)	3	30	20	4	6	61	34	64	Not played	CL	Third qualifying round	-
2023–24	1st (Premier Liha)	10	30	7	11	12	29	37	32	1/8 finals	EL	Play-off round	-
2024–25	1st (Premier Liha)	7	30	12	4	14	34	39	40	1/8 finals	-	-	-
2025-26	1st (Premier Liha)	8	30	12	10	8	42	36	46	1/32 finals	-	-	-
2026-27	1st (Premier Liha)	3	3	2	0	1	5	4	6	1/8 finals	-	-	TBD
