= 1981 Soviet First League =

Soviet First League
- Season: 1981

The 1981 Soviet First League was the eleventh season of the Soviet First League and the 41st season of the Soviet second-tier league competition.

== Final standings ==
Pos	Team	Pld	W	D	L	GF	GA	GD	Pts	Promotion or relegation
1	(Ukrainian Soviet Socialist Republic) Metalist Kharkiv (C, P)	46	25	12	9	68	33	+35	62	Promotion to Top League
2	(Georgian Soviet Socialist Republic) Torpedo Kutaisi (P)	46	26	4	16	57	46	+11	56	Promotion to Top League
3	(Russian Soviet Federative Socialist Republic) Lokomotiv Moscow	46	21	15	10	65	41	+24	54 (Note: There was a draw limit for the draws earned, 12. Only twelve draws earn a point, in contrast, over the limit draws earn no points.)	
4	(Russian Soviet Federative Socialist Republic) Shinnik Yaroslavl	46	21	10	15	68	58	+10	52	
5	(Ukrainian Soviet Socialist Republic) Kolos Nikopol	46	20	11	15	68	53	+15	51	
6	(Lithuanian Soviet Socialist Republic) Žalgiris Vilnius	46	17	15	14	48	39	+9	46	
7	(Russian Soviet Federative Socialist Republic) Iskra Smolensk	46	17	12	17	48	45	+3	46	
8	(Moldavian Soviet Socialist Republic) Nistru Kishinev	46	17	12	17	54	51	+3	46	
9	(Tajik Soviet Socialist Republic) Pamir Dushanbe	46	17	11	18	52	54	−2	45	
10	(Russian Soviet Federative Socialist Republic) Fakel Voronezh	46	17	10	19	45	44	+1	44	
11	(Ukrainian Soviet Socialist Republic) Karpaty Lvov	46	17	10	19	57	60	−3	44	
12	(Russian Soviet Federative Socialist Republic) Spartak Kostroma	46	16	16	14	49	50	−1	44	
13	(Ukrainian Soviet Socialist Republic) Metallurg Zaporozhia	46	16	14	16	57	51	+6	44	
14	(Georgian Soviet Socialist Republic) Guria Lanchkhuti	46	16	13	17	50	56	−6	44	
15	(Ukrainian Soviet Socialist Republic) Zarya Voroshilovgrad	46	16	13	17	44	53	−9	44	
16	(Ukrainian Soviet Socialist Republic) SKA Odessa	46	16	13	17	62	54	+8	44	
17	(Ukrainian Soviet Socialist Republic) SKA Kiev	46	16	10	20	59	71	−12	42	
18	(Uzbek Soviet Socialist Republic) Buston Dzhizak	46	16	9	21	47	63	−16	41	
19	(Russian Soviet Federative Socialist Republic) SKA Khabarovsk	46	16	8	22	50	58	−8	40	
20	(Ukrainian Soviet Socialist Republic) Prykarpattia Ivano-Frankivsk (Note: Prykarpattia Ivano-Frankivsk was called Spartak.) (R)	46	14	13	19	44	56	−12	40	Relegation to Second League
21	(Russian Soviet Federative Socialist Republic) Spartak Ordjonikidze (R)	46	14	12	20	36	49	−13	40	Relegation to Second League
22	(Russian Soviet Federative Socialist Republic) Kuzbass Kemerovo (R)	46	14	12	20	47	51	−4	40	Relegation to Second League
23	(Russian Soviet Federative Socialist Republic) Dinamo Stavropol (R)	46	13	14	19	45	60	−15	38	Relegation to Second League
24	(Kazakh Soviet Socialist Republic) Traktor Pavlodar (R)	46	12	15	19	41	65	−24	36	Relegation to Second League

Source: rsssf.com
(C) Champions; (P) Promoted; (R) Relegated

== Top scorers ==
#	Player	Club	Goals
1	Ravil Sharipov	Metallurg Zaporozhye	26 (6)
2	Vladimir Mukhanov	Lokomotiv Moscow	22 (1)
3	Gennady Smirnov	Fakel Voronezh	21 (2)
3	Viktor Nastashevskyi	SKA Kiev	21 (2)
5	Oleh Taran	SKA Odessa	20
6	Devizi Dardzhania	Torpedo Kutaisi	19 (1)
7	Nodar Bachiashvili	Metallist Kharkov	17
8	Yuriy Koryukov	Nistru Kishenev	15
9	Valeriy Tursunov	Pamir Dushanbe	14 (1)

== Number of teams by union republic ==
Rank	Union republic	Number of teams	Club(s)
1	RSFSR	9	Lokomotiv Moscow, Shinnik Yaroslavl, Iskra Smolensk, Fakel Voronezh, Spartak Kostroma, SKA Khabarovsk, Spartak Ordzhonikidze, Kuzbass Kemerevo, Dinamo Stavropol
2	Ukrainian SSR	8	Metallist Kharkov, Kolos Nikopol, Karpaty Lvov, Metallurg Zaporozhye, Zaria Voroshilovgrad, SKA Odessa, SKA Kiev, Prykarpatye Ivano-Frankovsk
3	Georgian SSR	2	Torpedo Kutaisi, Guria Lanchkhuti
4	Lithuanian SSR	1	Žalgiris Vilnius
4	Moldavian SSR	1	Nistru Kishinev
4	Tajik SSR	1	Pamir Dushanbe
4	Uzbek SSR	1	Zvezda Dzhizak
4	Kazakh SSR	1	Traktor Pavlodar

== Attendances ==
#	Football club	Average
1	Metalist Kharkiv	23,570
2	Torpedo Kutaisi	19,957
3	Fakel	14,504
4	Dinamo Stavropol	12,400
5	Traktor Pavlodar	11,926
6	Shinnik	10,783
7	Metalurh Zaporizhya	10,348
8	Nistru	10,139
9	Spartak Kostroma	9,965
10	Khabarovsk	9,578
11	Buston Dzhizak	9,070
12	Kuzbass	9,026
13	Iskra	8,757
14	Zorya	8,743
15	Guria	8,630
16	Kolos Nikopol	8,357
17	Prykarpattia	8,000
18	CSKA Pamir	7,500
19	Karpaty	6,570
20	Odessa	6,457
21	Spartak Ordzhonikidze	6,000
22	SKA Kyiv	4,461
23	Žalgiris	4,122
24	Lokomotiv Moscow	2,204
