= 1987 Soviet First League =

Soviet First League
- Season: 1987
- Champions: Chernomorets Odessa
- Promoted: Chernomorets Odessa; Lokomotiv Moscow
- Relegated: Fakel Voronezh; Torpedo Kutaisi; Krylia Sovetov Kuibyshev

The 1987 Soviet First League was the 48th season of the second tier of association football in the Soviet Union.

== Teams ==
=== Promoted teams ===
- FC Geolog Tyumen – (Returning after 25 seasons)
- FC Zaria Voroshilovgrad – (Returning after 2 seasons)
- FC Krylya Sovetov Kuibyshev – (Returning after a season)

=== Relegated teams ===
- FC Chernomorets Odessa – (Returning after a season)
- FC Torpedo Kutaisi – (Returning after 2 seasons)

== League standings ==
Pos	Team	Pld	W	D	L	GF	GA	GD	Pts	Promotion or relegation
1	(Ukrainian Soviet Socialist Republic) Chernomorets Odessa (C, P)	42	25	12	5	68	31	+37	62	Promotion to Top League
2	(Russian Soviet Federative Socialist Republic) Lokomotiv Moscow (P)	42	23	13	6	59	26	+33	58 (Note: There was a draw limit for the draws earned, 12. Only twelve draws earn a point, in contrast, over the limit draws earn no points. Note that this year Fakel was forced to relegation because of this rule.)	Promotion to Top League
3	(Latvian Soviet Socialist Republic) Daugava Riga	42	19	15	8	65	35	+30	50	
4	(Tajik Soviet Socialist Republic) Pamir Dushanbe	42	19	8	15	55	45	+10	46	
5	(Ukrainian Soviet Socialist Republic) SKA Karpaty Lvov	42	17	12	13	62	46	+16	46	
6	(Russian Soviet Federative Socialist Republic) Kuzbass Kemerevo	42	16	14	12	46	36	+10	44	
7	(Uzbek Soviet Socialist Republic) Pakhtakor Tashkent	42	16	12	14	47	44	+3	44	
8	(Ukrainian Soviet Socialist Republic) Kolos Nikopol	42	15	10	17	58	63	−5	40	
9	(Ukrainian Soviet Socialist Republic) Metallurg Zaporozhia	42	14	12	16	54	53	+1	40	
10	(Russian Soviet Federative Socialist Republic) Rostselmash Rostov-on-Don	42	14	13	15	49	55	−6	40	
11	(Russian Soviet Federative Socialist Republic) SKA Rostov-on-Don	42	16	7	19	40	56	−16	39	
12	(Russian Soviet Federative Socialist Republic) Geolog Tyumen	42	15	9	18	45	54	−9	39	
13	(Armenian Soviet Socialist Republic) Kotayk Abovyan	42	15	8	19	55	59	−4	38	
14	(Russian Soviet Federative Socialist Republic) Shinnik Yaroslavl	42	15	8	19	26	42	−16	38	
15	(Russian Soviet Federative Socialist Republic) Dynamo Stavropol	42	13	15	14	46	52	−6	38	
16	(Ukrainian Soviet Socialist Republic) Zarya Voroshilovgrad	42	13	15	14	46	60	−14	38	
17	(Russian Soviet Federative Socialist Republic) Rotor Volgograd	42	13	10	19	45	50	−5	36	
18	(Russian Soviet Federative Socialist Republic) Spartak Ordjonikidze	42	12	12	18	37	46	−9	36	
19	(Georgian Soviet Socialist Republic) Dinamo Batumi	42	12	11	19	38	45	−7	35	
20	(Russian Soviet Federative Socialist Republic) Fakel Voronezh (R)	42	11	16	15	35	37	−2	34	Relegation to Second League
21	(Georgian Soviet Socialist Republic) Torpedo Kutaisi (R)	42	11	12	19	30	51	−21	34	Relegation to Second League
22	(Russian Soviet Federative Socialist Republic) Krylya Sovetov Kuybyshev (R)	42	10	12	20	40	60	−20	32	Relegation to Second League

Source: RSSSF
(C) Champions; (P) Promoted; (R) Relegated

== Top scorers ==
#	Player	Club	Goals
1	Viktor Pimushin	Kuzbass Kemerevo	23 (3)
2	Serhiy N. Morozov	Metallurg Zaporozhye	22 (5)
3	Aleksandr Azimov	Pamir Dushanbe	21 (8)
4	Jevgeņijs Miļevskis	Daugava Riga	19 (3)
5	Mykola Fedorenko	Kolos Nikopol	18 (5)
5	Seyran Osipov	Dynamo Stavropol	18 (5)
7	Aleksandrs Starkovs	Daugava Riga	16 (1)
7	Marat Kabayev	Pakhtakor Tashkent	16 (5)
9	Sergei Borisov	Rotor Volgograd	14
10	Aleksandr Kalashnikov	Lokomotiv Moscow	13

== Number of teams by union republic ==
Rank	Union republic	Number of teams	Club(s)
1	RSFSR	11	Lokomotiv Moscow, Kuzbass Kemerovo, Rostselmash Rostov-na-Donu, SKA Rostov-na-Donu, Geolog Tyumen, Shinnik Yaroslavl, Dinamo Stavropol, Rotor Volgograd, Spartak Vladikavkaz, Fakel Voronezh, Krylia Sovetov Kuibyshev
2	Ukrainian SSR	5	Chernomorets Odessa, SKA Karpaty Lvov, Kolos Nikopol, Metallurg Zaporozhye, Zaria Voroshilovgrad
3	Georgian SSR	2	Torpedo Kutaisi, Dinamo Batumi
4	Uzbek SSR	1	Pakhtakor Tashkent
4	Latvian SSR	1	Daugava Riga
4	Tajik SSR	1	Pamir Dushanbe
4	Armenian SSR	1	Kotaik Abovian

== See also ==
- Soviet First League
