= 1980 Soviet First League =

Soviet First League
- Season: 1980

The 1980 Soviet First League was the tenth season of the Soviet First League and the 40th season of the Soviet second-tier league competition.

== Final standings ==
Pos	Team	Pld	W	D	L	GF	GA	GD	Pts	Promotion or relegation
1	(Ukrainian Soviet Socialist Republic) Tavria Simferopol (C, P)	46	28	9	9	82	42	+40	65	Promotion to Top League
2	(Ukrainian Soviet Socialist Republic) Dnipro Dnipropetrovsk (P)	46	27	8	11	60	47	+13	62	Promotion to Top League
3	(Ukrainian Soviet Socialist Republic) Metalist Kharkiv	46	24	12	10	76	40	+36	60	
4	(Tajik Soviet Socialist Republic) Pamir Dushanbe	46	23	9	14	62	51	+11	55	
5	(Ukrainian Soviet Socialist Republic) Kolos Nikopol	46	20	11	15	70	47	+23	51	
6	(Russian Soviet Federative Socialist Republic) SKA Khabarovsk	46	20	10	16	45	60	−15	50	
7	(Russian Soviet Federative Socialist Republic) Dinamo Stavropol	46	23	3	20	64	66	−2	49	
8	(Moldavian Soviet Socialist Republic) Nistru Kishinev	46	20	8	18	60	55	+5	48	
9	(Russian Soviet Federative Socialist Republic) Iskra Smolensk	46	18	11	17	50	46	+4	47	
10	(Ukrainian Soviet Socialist Republic) Zarya Voroshilovgrad	46	19	8	19	68	60	+8	46	
11	(Georgian Soviet Socialist Republic) Guria Lanchkhuti	46	18	10	18	68	73	−5	46	
12	(Russian Soviet Federative Socialist Republic) Fakel Voronezh	46	17	16	13	49	36	+13	46 (Note: There was a draw limit for the draws earned, 12. Only twelve draws earn a point, in contrast, over the limit draws earn no points.)	
13	(Georgian Soviet Socialist Republic) Torpedo Kutaisi	46	18	9	19	62	54	+8	45	
14	(Russian Soviet Federative Socialist Republic) Kuzbass Kemerovo	46	18	7	21	61	77	−16	43	
15	(Russian Soviet Federative Socialist Republic) Spartak Ordjonikidze	46	17	9	20	43	50	−7	43	
16	(Ukrainian Soviet Socialist Republic) SKA Odessa	46	16	10	20	52	47	+5	42	
17	(Ukrainian Soviet Socialist Republic) Spartak Ivano-Frankivsk	46	16	10	20	54	67	−13	42	
18	(Lithuanian Soviet Socialist Republic) Žalgiris Vilnius	46	15	14	17	50	39	+11	42	
19	(Uzbek Soviet Socialist Republic) Buston Dzhizak	46	15	12	19	48	61	−13	42	
20	(Ukrainian Soviet Socialist Republic) Metallurg Zaporozhia	46	15	11	20	57	67	−10	41	
21	(Russian Soviet Federative Socialist Republic) Shinnik Yaroslavl	46	14	15	17	51	57	−6	40	
22	(Russian Soviet Federative Socialist Republic) Krylya Sovetov Kuibyshev (R)	46	11	16	19	43	62	−19	34	Relegation to Second League
23	(Russian Soviet Federative Socialist Republic) Spartak Nalchik (R)	46	8	15	23	35	59	−24	28	Relegation to Second League
24	(Russian Soviet Federative Socialist Republic) Uralmash Sverdlovsk (R)	46	8	5	33	35	82	−47	21	Relegation to Second League

Source: rsssf.com
(C) Champions; (P) Promoted; (R) Relegated

== Top scorers ==
#	Player	Club	Goals
1	Volodymyr Naumenko	Tavriya Simferopol	33 (2)
2	Anatoliy Bykov	Dynamo Stavropol	23 (1)
3	Gennady Smirnov	Fakel Voronezh	22 (2)
4	Vitaly Razdayev	Kuzbass Kemerevo	21
4	Nodar Bachiashvili	Metallist Kharkov	21 (1)
6	Merab Megreladze	Guria Lanchkhuti	20
7	Oleksandr Pogoryelov	Kolos Nikopol	19
7	Vadim Pavlenko	Dnepr Dneprpropetrovsk	19 (5)
9	Ivan Shariy	Metallurg Zaporozhye	18 (1)

== Number of teams by union republic ==
Rank	Union republic	Number of teams	Club(s)
1	RSFSR	10	SKA Khabarovsk, Dinamo Stavropol, Iskra Smolensk, Fakel Voronezh, Kuzbass Kemerevo, Spartak Ordzhonikidze, Shinnik Yaroslavl, Krylia Sovetov Kuibyshev, Spartak Nalchik, Uralmash Sverdlovsk
2	Ukrainian SSR	8	Tavria Simferopol, Dnepr Dnepropetrovsk, Metallist Kharkov, Kolos Nikopol, Zaria Voroshilovgrad, SKA Odessa, Prykarpatye Ivano-Frankovsk, Metallurg Zaporozhye
3	Georgian SSR	2	Torpedo Kutaisi, Guria Lanchkhuti
4	Tajik SSR	1	Pamir Dushanbe
4	Moldavian SSR	1	Nistru Kishinev
4	Lithuanian SSR	1	Žalgiris Vilnius
4	Uzbek SSR	1	Buston Dzhizak
