= 1983 Soviet First League =

Soviet First League
- Season: 1983

The 1983 Soviet First League was the thirteenth season of the Soviet First League and the 43rd season of the Soviet second tier league competition.

== Final standings ==
Pos	Team	Pld	W	D	L	GF	GA	GD	Pts	Promotion or relegation
1	(Kazakh Soviet Socialist Republic) Kairat Almaty (C, P)	42	25	10	7	78	36	+42	60	Promotion to Top League
2	(Russian Soviet Federative Socialist Republic) SKA Rostov-on-Don (P)	42	23	13	6	73	36	+37	58 (Note: There was a draw limit for the draws earned, 12. Only twelve draws earn a point, in contrast, over the limit draws earn no points.)	Promotion to Top League
3	(Russian Soviet Federative Socialist Republic) Fakel Voronezh	42	21	12	9	53	30	+23	54	
4	(Russian Soviet Federative Socialist Republic) Rotor Volgograd	42	23	5	14	62	48	+14	51	
5	(Ukrainian Soviet Socialist Republic) Metallurg Zaporozhia	42	21	8	13	66	46	+20	50	
6	(Ukrainian Soviet Socialist Republic) Kolos Nikopol	42	18	12	12	69	52	+17	48	
7	(Ukrainian Soviet Socialist Republic) Tavria Simferopol	42	16	12	14	78	67	+11	44	
8	(Russian Soviet Federative Socialist Republic) Kuban Krasnodar	42	16	11	15	58	48	+10	43	
9	(Georgian Soviet Socialist Republic) Guria Lanchkhuti	42	19	4	19	52	71	−19	42	
10	(Russian Soviet Federative Socialist Republic) Kuzbass Kemerovo	42	15	13	14	50	49	+1	42	
11	(Ukrainian Soviet Socialist Republic) SKA Karpaty Lvov	42	15	12	15	43	46	−3	42	
12	(Tajik Soviet Socialist Republic) Pamir Dushanbe	42	15	10	17	46	55	−9	40	
13	(Ukrainian Soviet Socialist Republic) Zarya Voroshilovgrad	42	14	11	17	66	67	−1	39	
14	(Latvian Soviet Socialist Republic) Daugava Riga	42	14	10	18	57	63	−6	38	
15	(Russian Soviet Federative Socialist Republic) Lokomotiv Moscow	42	13	13	16	51	47	+4	38	
16	(Uzbek Soviet Socialist Republic) Zvezda Dzhizak	42	13	12	17	62	64	−2	38	
17	(Russian Soviet Federative Socialist Republic) Iskra Smolensk	42	14	9	19	51	47	+4	37	
18	(Russian Soviet Federative Socialist Republic) Shinnik Yaroslavl	42	13	11	18	45	75	−30	37	
19	(Russian Soviet Federative Socialist Republic) SKA Khabarovsk	42	12	12	18	33	54	−21	36	
20	(Byelorussian Soviet Socialist Republic) Dnepr Mogilev (R)	42	12	13	17	40	60	−20	36	Relegation to Second League
21	(Russian Soviet Federative Socialist Republic) Textilshchik Ivanovo (R)	42	8	10	24	45	83	−38	26	Relegation to Second League
22	(Russian Soviet Federative Socialist Republic) Dinamo Kirov (R)	42	5	11	26	29	63	−34	21	Relegation to Second League

Source: rsssf.com
(C) Champions; (P) Promoted; (R) Relegated

== Top scorers ==
#	Player	Club	Goals
1	Yuriy Bondarenko	Tavriya Simferopol	25 (1)
2	Valeriy Tursunov	Pamir Dushanbe	23 (2)
3	Vitaly Razdayev	Kuzbass Kemerevo	22 (2)
4	Evstaphiy Pechlevanidis	Kairat Alma-Ata	21
4	Ravil Sharipov	Metallurg Zaporozhye	21 (8)
6	Oleksandr Malyshenko	Zaria Voroshilovgrad	20
7	Sergey Andreyev	SKA Rostov-na-Donu	19
7	Sergei Stukashov	Kairat Alma-Ata	19
9	Nikolai Kolesov	Kuban Krasnodar	18

== Number of teams by union republic ==
Rank	Union republic	Number of teams	Club(s)
1	RSFSR	11	SKA Rostov-na-Donu, Fakel Voronezh, Rotor Volgograd, Kuban Krasnodar, Kuzbass Kemerovo, Lokomotiv Moscow, Iskra Smolensk, Shinnik Yaroslavl, SKA Khabarovsk, Tekstilshchik Ivanovo, Dinamo Kirov
2	Ukrainian SSR	5	Metallurg Zaporozhye, Kolos Nikopol, Tavria Simferopol, SKA Karpaty Lvov, Zaria Voroshilovgrad
3	Georgian SSR	1	Guria Lanchkhuti
3	Kazakh SSR	1	Kairat Alma-Ata
3	Tajik SSR	1	Pamir Dushanbe
3	Latvian SSR	1	Daugava Riga
3	Uzbek SSR	1	Zvezda Dzhizak
3	Belarusian SSR	1	Dnepr Mogilev
