= Gisa Pshukov =

Russian footballer

Personal information
- Full name: Gisa Mukhadovich Pshukov
- Date of birth: 19 August 1971 (age 55)
- Height: 1.80 m (5 ft 11 in)
- Position: Goalkeeper

Senior career*
Years	Team	Apps	(Gls)
1989–1991	FC Dynamo-2 Moscow	58	(0)
1992–1994	FC Iskra Smolensk	74	(0)
1995	FC Chernomorets Novorossiysk	1	(0)
1995–2000	FC Kavkazkabel Prokhladny	153	(0)
- * Club domestic league appearances and goals

Gisa Mukhadovich Pshukov (Russian: Гиса Мухадович Пшуков; born 19 August 1971) is a former Russian football player.
