= Vladimir Galayba =

Russian footballer

Personal information
- Date of birth: July 27, 1960 (age 66)
- Height: 1.77 m (5 ft 9 1/2 in)
- Positions: Midfielder; forward

Senior career*
Years	Team	Apps	(Gls)
1976–1977	FC Rostselmash Rostov-on-Don	3	(0)
1978–1984	FC Torpedo Moscow	95	(3)
1985–1986	FC SKA Rostov-on-Don	70	(5)
1987	FC Torpedo Moscow	10	(0)
1988	FC Kuzbass Kemerovo	38	(4)
1989	FC Zorkiy Krasnogorsk	15	(1)
1989–1998	IFK Luleå	145	(25)
- * Club domestic league appearances and goals

Vladimir Galayba (Russian: Владимир Галайба; born July 27, 1960) is a retired Russian professional footballer.

He played 2 games in the European Cup Winners' Cup 1986–87 for FC Torpedo Moscow.

== Honours ==
- Soviet Cup finalist: 1982, 1988 (played in the early stages of the 1987/88 tournament for FC Torpedo Moscow).
