= Aleksandr Kalashnikov =

Kyrgyzstani footballer (born 1957)

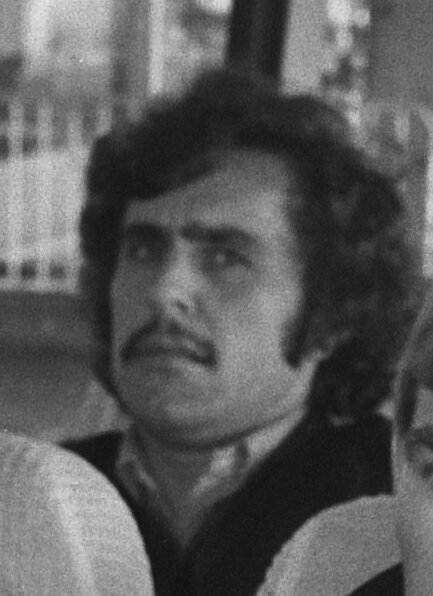

Personal information
- Full name: Aleksandr Pavlovich Kalashnikov
- Date of birth: 3 January 1957 (age 69)
- Place of birth: Syria
- Position: Striker

Senior career*
Years	Team	Apps	(Gls)
1976	Alga		
1976–1978	Sibir		
1978–1982	Spartak	102	(19)
1983	Iskra	38	(13)
1984–1988	Lokomotiv	151	(49)
1988	Alga	28	(13)
1989–1991	Vulkan	59	(23)
- * Club domestic league appearances and goals

Aleksandr Pavlovich Kalashnikov (Russian: Александр Калашников; born 3 January 1957) is a Kyrgyzstani former football manager and footballer.

== Career ==
Kalashnikov started his career with Kyrgyzstani side Alga. In 1976, he signed for Russian side Sibir. In 1978, Kalashnikov signed for Russian side Spartak. He made 102 league appearances and scored nineteen goals while playing for the club. He helped them win the league. In 1983, he signed for Russian side Iskra. He made thirty-eight league appearances and scored thirteen goals while playing for the club. In 1984, he signed for Russian side Lokomotiv. He made 151 league appearances and scored forty-nine goals while playing for the club. He helped the club achieve promotion. After that, he signed for Kyrgyzstani side Alga. He made twenty-eight league appearances and scored thirteen goals while playing for the club. In 1989, he signed for Russian side Vulkan. He made fifty-nine league appearances and scored twenty-three goals while playing for the club.

== Personal life ==
Kalashnikov was born on 3 January 1957 in Kyrgyzstan. He attended Kyrgyz Technical University in Kyrgyzstan. He has been married. He has children and grandchildren. After retiring from professional football, he worked in the tobacco industry. He served in the Soviet military.
