= 1982 Soviet First League =

Annual soccer competition

Soviet First League
- Season: 1982

The 1982 Soviet First League was the twelfth season of the Soviet First League and the 42nd season of the Soviet second tier league competition.

== Final standings ==
Pos	Team	Pld	W	D	L	GF	GA	GD	Pts	Promotion or relegation
1	(Lithuanian Soviet Socialist Republic) Žalgiris Vilnius (C, P)	42	23	10	9	65	34	+31	56	Promotion to Top League
2	(Moldavian Soviet Socialist Republic) Nistru Kishinev (P)	42	23	10	9	67	38	+29	56	Promotion to Top League
3	(Ukrainian Soviet Socialist Republic) Kolos Nikopol	42	22	11	9	63	38	+25	55	
4	(Russian Soviet Federative Socialist Republic) Lokomotiv Moscow	42	21	13	8	63	32	+31	54 (Note: There was a draw limit for the draws earned, 12. Only twelve draws earn a point, in contrast, over the limit draws earn no points.)	
5	(Russian Soviet Federative Socialist Republic) Fakel Voronezh	42	21	13	8	60	33	+27	54	
6	(Ukrainian Soviet Socialist Republic) Zorya Voroshilovhrad	42	19	9	14	65	52	+13	47	
7	(Russian Soviet Federative Socialist Republic) Shinnik Yaroslavl	42	19	7	16	59	58	+1	45	
8	(Latvian Soviet Socialist Republic) Daugava Riga	42	16	12	14	58	51	+7	44	
9	(Tajik Soviet Socialist Republic) Pamir Dushanbe	42	16	12	14	49	49	0	44	
10	(Ukrainian Soviet Socialist Republic) SKA Karpaty Lviv (Note: Karpaty Lvov merged with SKA Lvov into SKA-Karpaty.)	42	16	10	16	44	37	+7	42	
11	(Russian Soviet Federative Socialist Republic) SKA Rostov-on-Don	42	16	10	16	59	52	+7	42	
12	(Ukrainian Soviet Socialist Republic) Metallurh Zaporozhzhia	42	17	7	18	54	42	+12	41	
13	(Ukrainian Soviet Socialist Republic) Tavriya Simferopol	42	17	7	18	58	50	+8	41	
14	(Russian Soviet Federative Socialist Republic) Rotor Volgograd	42	14	12	16	63	64	−1	40	
15	(Russian Soviet Federative Socialist Republic) Dinamo Kirov	42	15	8	19	45	57	−12	38	
16	(Russian Soviet Federative Socialist Republic) SKA Khabarovsk	42	14	10	18	34	48	−14	38	
17	(Russian Soviet Federative Socialist Republic) Iskra Smolensk	42	13	13	16	53	67	−14	38	
18	(Georgian Soviet Socialist Republic) Guria Lanchkhuti	42	15	7	20	48	67	−19	37	
19	(Uzbek Soviet Socialist Republic) Zvezda Dzhizak (Note: Zvezda Dzhizak was called Buston.)	42	14	9	19	56	77	−21	37	
20	(Ukrainian Soviet Socialist Republic) SKA Odessa (R)	42	11	13	18	40	48	−8	34	Relegation to Second League
21	(Ukrainian Soviet Socialist Republic) SKA Kyiv (R)	42	5	10	27	31	81	−50	20	Relegation to Second League
22	(Russian Soviet Federative Socialist Republic) Spartak Kostroma (R)	42	4	9	29	18	77	−59	17	Relegation to Second League

Source: rsssf.com
(C) Champions; (P) Promoted; (R) Relegated

=== Match for 1st place ===
16 November 1982

Žalgiris Vilnius (Lithuanian Soviet Socialist Republic)	1–0	(Moldavian Soviet Socialist Republic) Nistru Kishinev
Jakubauskas 70'	Report

Simferopol
Attendance: 3,000
Referee: Valeriy Butenko (Moscow)

== Top scorers ==
#	Player	Club	Goals
1	Heorhiy Koliadyuk	Kolos Nikopol	26
2	Hryhoriy Batych	Nistru Kishenev	25 (5)
3	Ravil Sharipov	Metallurg Zaporozhye	24 (6)
4	Sigitas Jakubauskas	Žalgiris Vilnius	23 (1)
5	Valeriy Tursunov	Pamir Dushanbe	21 (3)
6	Volodymyr Naumenko	Tavriya Simferopol	20 (5)
7	Vladimir Mukhanov	Lokomotiv Moscow	17
7	Sergey Andreyev	SKA Rostov-na-Donu	17 (1)
9	Viktor Vasilyev	Rotor Volgograd	16
9	Aleksandrs Starkovs	Daugava Riga	16
9	Gennady Smirnov	Fakel Voronezh	16 (4)

== Number of teams by union republic ==
Rank	Union republic	Number of teams	Club(s)
1	RSFSR	9	Lokomotiv Moscow, Fakel Voronezh, Shinnik Yaroslavl, SKA Rostov-na-Donu, Rotor Volgograd, Dinamo Kirov, SKA Khabarovsk, Iskra Smolensk, Spartak Kostroma
2	Ukrainian SSR	7	Kolos Nikopol, Zaria Voroshilovgrad, SKA Karpaty Lvov, Metallurg Zaporozhye, Tavria Simferopol, SKA Odessa, SKA Kiev
3	Lithuanian SSR	1	Žalgiris Vilnius
3	Moldavian SSR	1	Nistru Kishinev
3	Latvian SSR	1	Daugava Riga
3	Tajik SSR	1	Pamir Dushanbe
3	Georgian SSR	1	Guria Lanchkhuti
3	Uzbek SSR	1	Zvezda Dzhizak
