= Alexander Frank =

German footballer (born 1982)

Personal information
- Full name: Alexander Alexandrovich Frank
- Date of birth: 23 September 1982 (age 44)
- Place of birth: Tajikistan
- Positions: Defender; midfielder

Youth career
- FC St. Pauli
- Sheriff Tiraspol
- Admira Wacker Mödling

Senior career*
Years	Team	Apps	(Gls)
2001–2002	SV Würmla	14	(1)
2002–2003	VfB Lübeck II		
2003–2006	FC Erfurt-Nord	39	(2)
2006	Rot-Weiß Erfurt	1	(0)
2006	→ Rot-Weiß Erfurt II (loan)	5	(0)
2007	CSKA Pamir Dushanbe		
2007–2008	FC Schönberg 95	2	(0)
2008–2010	Barkchi		
2011	Qizilqum Zarafshon		
2011	SV Todesfelde	19	(3)
2012	FC Istiklol		
2013	SV Todesfelde		
2013	VfL Vorwerk		
2014–2015	FC Dornbreite	42	(1)
- * Club domestic league appearances and goals

Alexander Alexandrovich Frank (Russian: Александр Франк; born 23 September 1982) is a German former footballer who played as a defender or midfielder.

== Early life ==
Frank moved with his family to Austria and Germany at a young age. He joined the youth academy of Moldovan side Sheriff Tiraspol at the age of fifteen.

== Career ==
In 2001, Frank signed for Austrian side SV Würmla. In 2002, he signed for German side VfB Lübeck II. In 2003, he signed for German side FC Erfurt-Nord. In 2006, he signed for German side Rot-Weiß Erfurt. In 2007, he signed for Tajikistani side CSKA Pamir Dushanbe. After that, he signed for German side FC Schönberg 95. In 2008, he signed for Tajikistani side Barkchi. In 2010, he signed for Tajikistani side FC Istiklol. He helped the club win the league. In 2011, he signed for Uzbekistani side Qizilqum Zarafshon. After that, he signed for German side SV Todesfelde. In 2012, he returned to Tajikistani side FC Istiklol. He helped the club win the 2012 AFC President's Cup. In 2013, he returned to German side SV Todesfelde. After that, he signed for German side VfL Vorwerk. In 2014, he signed for German side FC Dornbreite.

== Style of play ==
Frank mainly operated as a defender or a midfielder, being deployed as a right-back and central midfielder while playing for Tajikistani side FC Istiklol.

== Personal life ==
After retiring from professional football, Frank worked as a football agent. He is the son of Tajikistani footballer Aleksandr Azimov. He has been married. He has a son.
