= 1982 Soviet Cup =

1982 Cup of USSR in Football
Кубок СССР

Tournament details
- Country: Soviet Union
- Dates: February 19 – May 9
- Teams: 40

Final positions
- Champions: Dynamo Kyiv
- Runners-up: Torpedo Moscow

The 1982 Soviet Cup was an association football cup competition of the Soviet Union. The winner of the competition, Dinamo Kiev qualified for the continental tournament.

== Participating teams ==
Enter in Grouped stage
1982 Vysshaya Liga; 16/18 teams	1982 Pervaya Liga; 22/22 teams
✓ Dinamo Minsk; ✓ Spartak Moscow; ✓ Ararat Erevan; ✓ Pakhtakor Tashkent; ✓ Zenit Leningrad; ✓ Torpedo Moscow; ✓ Dnepr Dnepropetrovsk; ✓ Chernomorets Odessa; ✓ Dinamo Moscow; ✓ Metallist Kharkov; ✓ FC Torpedo Kutaisi; ✓ Shakhter Donetsk; ✓ CSKA Moscow; ✓ Neftchi Baku; ✓ Kuban Krasnodar; ✓ Kairat Alma-Ata	✓ Zalgiris Vilnius; ✓ Nistru Kishenev; ✓ Kolos Nikopol; ✓ Lokomotiv Moscow; ✓ Fakel Voronezh; ✓ Zaria Voroshilovgrad; ✓ Shinnik Yaroslavl; ✓ Daugava Riga; ✓ Pamir Dushambe; ✓ SKA Karpaty Lvov; ✓ SKA Rostov-na-Donu; ✓ Metallurg Zaporozhye; ✓ Tavria Simferopol; ✓ Rotor Volgograd; ✓ Dinamo Kirov; ✓ SKA Khabarovsk; ✓ Iskra Smolensk; ✓ Guria Lanchkhuti; ✓ Zvezda Dzhizak; ✓ SKA Odessa; ✓ SKA Kiev; ✓ Spartak Kostroma

Source: []

Notes

- Dinamo Kiev and Dinamo Tbilisi received byes all the way through the quarterfinals.

== Competition schedule ==
=== Group stage ===
Games took place between February 19 – March 4, 1982.

==== Group I ====
Pos	Team	Pld	W	D	L	GF	GA	GD	Pts	Promotion, qualification or relegation
1	Dinamo Minsk	5	4	1	0	18	5	+13	9	Promotion to play-off stage
2	Daugava Riga	5	3	0	2	8	7	+1	6	Promotion to play-off stage
3	Zenit Leningrad	5	2	2	1	8	3	+5	6	
4	SKA–Karpaty Lvov	5	2	1	2	5	6	−1	5	
5	Zaria Voroshilovgrad	5	1	2	2	7	10	−3	4	
6	Zhalgiris Vilnius	5	0	0	5	1	16	−15	0	

Updated to match(es) played on unknown. Source: RSSSF
Rules for classification: 1) points; 2) wins; 3) head-to-head points; 4) head-to-head wins; 5) head-to-head goals difference; 6) goals difference; 7) goals scored; 8) draw of lots.

==== Group II ====
Pos	Team	Pld	W	D	L	GF	GA	GD	Pts	Promotion, qualification or relegation
1	Tavria Simferopol	5	3	2	0	6	2	+4	8	Promotion to play-off stage
2	Dnepr Dnepropetrovsk	5	3	1	1	7	2	+5	7	Promotion to play-off stage
3	Chernomorets Odessa	5	2	1	2	5	4	+1	5	
4	Metallurg Zaporozhie	5	1	2	2	5	7	−2	4	
5	Nistru Kishinev	5	1	1	3	2	5	−3	3	
6	SKA Odessa	5	1	1	3	4	9	−5	3	

Updated to match(es) played on unknown. Source: RSSSF
Rules for classification: 1) points; 2) wins; 3) head-to-head points; 4) head-to-head wins; 5) head-to-head goals difference; 6) goals difference; 7) goals scored; 8) draw of lots.

==== Group III ====
Pos	Team	Pld	W	D	L	GF	GA	GD	Pts	Promotion, qualification or relegation
1	SKA Rostov-na-Donu	5	4	1	0	9	3	+6	9	Promotion to play-off stage
2	Neftchi Baku	5	3	1	1	6	4	+2	7	Promotion to play-off stage
3	Metallist Kharkov	5	2	2	1	7	3	+4	6	
4	Pamir Dushanbe	5	2	0	3	5	6	−1	4	
5	Rotor Volgograd	5	1	2	2	5	6	−1	4	
6	SKA Kiev	5	0	0	5	1	11	−10	0	

Updated to match(es) played on unknown. Source: RSSSF
Rules for classification: 1) points; 2) wins; 3) head-to-head points; 4) head-to-head wins; 5) head-to-head goals difference; 6) goals difference; 7) goals scored; 8) draw of lots.

==== Group IV ====
Pos	Team	Pld	W	D	L	GF	GA	GD	Pts	Promotion, qualification or relegation
1	Pakhtakor Tashkent	5	3	2	0	6	1	+5	8	Promotion to play-off stage
2	Ararat Yerevan	5	3	2	0	3	0	+3	8	Promotion to play-off stage
3	CSKA Moscow	5	2	3	0	5	3	+2	7	
4	Dinamo Kirov	5	2	0	3	4	5	−1	4	
5	Kolos Nikopol	5	1	0	4	4	4	0	2	
6	Zvezda Jizzak	5	0	1	4	2	11	−9	1	

Updated to match(es) played on unknown. Source: RSSSF
Rules for classification: 1) points; 2) wins; 3) head-to-head points; 4) head-to-head wins; 5) head-to-head goals difference; 6) goals difference; 7) goals scored; 8) draw of lots.

==== Group V ====
Pos	Team	Pld	W	D	L	GF	GA	GD	Pts	Promotion, qualification or relegation
1	Fakel Voronezh	5	4	0	1	9	2	+7	8	Promotion to play-off stage
2	Torpedo Moscow	5	4	0	1	7	2	+5	8	Promotion to play-off stage
3	Dinamo Moscow	5	4	0	1	4	2	+2	8	
4	Shakhter Donetsk	5	2	0	3	6	7	−1	4	
5	Guria Lanchkhuti	5	0	1	4	2	8	−6	1	
6	Shinnik Yaroslavl	5	0	1	4	2	9	−7	1	

Updated to match(es) played on unknown. Source: RSSSF
Rules for classification: 1) points; 2) wins; 3) head-to-head points; 4) head-to-head wins; 5) head-to-head goals difference; 6) goals difference; 7) goals scored; 8) draw of lots.

==== Group VI ====
Pos	Team	Pld	W	D	L	GF	GA	GD	Pts	Promotion, qualification or relegation
1	Kuban Krasnodar	3	2	1	0	3	0	+3	5	Promotion to play-off stage
2	Lokomotiv Moscow	3	1	1	1	4	4	0	3	
3	Kairat Alma-Ata	3	1	1	1	3	4	−1	3	
4	Torpedo Kutaisi	3	0	1	2	3	5	−2	1	

Updated to match(es) played on unknown. Source: RSSSF
Rules for classification: 1) points; 2) wins; 3) head-to-head points; 4) head-to-head wins; 5) head-to-head goals difference; 6) goals difference; 7) goals scored; 8) draw of lots.

==== Group VII ====
Pos	Team	Pld	W	D	L	GF	GA	GD	Pts	Promotion, qualification or relegation
1	Iskra Smolensk	3	2	0	1	4	3	+1	4	Promotion to play-off stage
2	Spartak Moscow	3	2	0	1	5	2	+3	4	
3	SKA Khabarovsk	3	1	1	1	4	4	0	3	
4	Spartak Kostroma	3	0	1	2	2	6	−4	1	

Updated to match(es) played on unknown. Source: RSSSF
Rules for classification: 1) points; 2) wins; 3) head-to-head points; 4) head-to-head wins; 5) head-to-head goals difference; 6) goals difference; 7) goals scored; 8) draw of lots.

=== Play-off stage ===
==== Round of 16 ====
The base game day was March 14, 1982

Dnepr Dnepropetrovsk	1:0	SKA Rostov-na-Donu
Iskra Smolensk	1:5	Dinamo Minsk	(in Moscow)
Kuban Krasnodar	0:1	Fakel Voronezh	(in Sochi)
Pakhtakor Tashkent	1:1	Neftchi Baku	(a.e.t.), (3–2 p)
Tavria Simferopol	2:1	Ararat Yerevan
Torpedo Moscow	1:0	Daugava Riga	(a.e.t.) (in Adler)

==== Quarterfinals ====
The base game day was March 21, 1982

Dinamo Kiev	1:0	Dinamo Minsk
Dinamo Tbilisi	4:1	Tavria Simferopol
Fakel Voronezh	1:2	Dnepr Dnepropetrovsk	(in Sochi)
Pakhtakor Tashkent	1:1	Torpedo Moscow	(a.e.t.), (5–6 p)

==== Semifinals ====
Dnepr Dnepropetrovsk	0:2	Torpedo Moscow	(April 10, 1982)
Dinamo Kiev	2:0	Dinamo Tbilisi	(April 29, 1982)

==== Final ====
9 May 1982

Torpedo Moscow	0 – 1	Dynamo Kyiv
	Report	Baltacha 34'

Lenin's Central Stadium, Moscow
Attendance: 51,200
Referee: Romualdas Juška (Vilnius)
