= Aleksandr Azimov =

Tajikistani footballer (born 1961)

Personal information
- Full name: Aleksandr Uzakovich Azimov
- Date of birth: January 3, 1961 (age 65)
- Place of birth: Tajikistan
- Position: Striker

Senior career*
Years	Team	Apps	(Gls)
1981–1990	CSKA Pamir Dushanbe	309	(77)
1990	SK Austria Klagenfurt		
1991–1992	Wolfsberger AC		
- * Club domestic league appearances and goals

Aleksandr Uzakovich Azimov (Russian: Александр Азимов; born 3 January 1961) is a Tajikistani former footballer who played as a striker.

== Early life ==
Azimov moved to Uzbekistan at the age of sixteen. After that, he returned to Tajikistan and attended school.

== Career ==
Azimov has been described as a "popular and recognizable football player in Tajikistan". In 1981, he signed for Tajikistani side CSKA Pamir Dushanbe. He helped the club win the league. In 1990, he signed for Austrian side SK Austria Klagenfurt. In 1991, he signed for Austrian side Wolfsberger AC.

== Style of play ==
Azimov mainly operated as a striker. He was known for his shooting ability and free-kick ability.

== Personal life ==
After retiring from professional football, Azimov moved to Germany. He is the father of German footballer Alexander Frank.
