= Viktor Nastashevskyi =

Soviet footballer (1957–2025)

Personal information
- Full name: Viktor Viktorovych Nastashevskyi
- Date of birth: 10 August 1957
- Place of birth: Karaganda, Kazakh SSR, Soviet Union
- Date of death: 1 January 2025 (aged 67)
- Height: 1.76 m (5 ft 9 in)
- Position: Forward

Senior career*
Years	Team	Apps	(Gls)
1974–1976	Dynamo Kyiv	1	(0)
1977	Shakhtar Donetsk	3	(0)
1978–1985	SKA Kiev		(114)
1985	Kolos Nikopol	7	(0)
1986–1987	Kryvbas Kryvyi Rih	53	(33)
1988–1991	Miedz Legnica		

Managerial career
- 1998: Qizilqum Zarafshon (assistant)
Medal record
Men's football
Representing Soviet Union
UEFA European U-18 Championships
Winner	1976 Hungary
- * Club domestic league appearances and goals

Viktor Viktorovych Nastashevskyi (Ukrainian: Віктор Вікторович Насташевський; 10 August 1957 – 1 January 2025) was a Ukrainian Soviet footballer who played as a forward. Nastashevskyi died on 1 January 2025, at the age of 67.
