= Vladimir Pivtsov =

Russian footballer

Personal information
- Full name: Vladimir Viktorovich Pivtsov
- Date of birth: 26 March 1960 (age 66)
- Place of birth: Moscow, Russian SFSR
- Height: 1.87 m (6 ft 1 1/2 in)
- Position: Defender

Youth career
- FC Lokomotiv Moscow
- FShM Moscow

Senior career*
Years	Team	Apps	(Gls)
1980	FShM Moscow	33	(0)
1981–1986	FC Torpedo Moscow	110	(0)
1987	Neftchi Baku PFC	7	(0)
1988	FC Nistru Chişinău	3	(0)
1989	FC Spartak Kostroma	13	(0)
1989–1990	FC Fakel Voronezh	24	(0)
1990	FC Khimik Belorechensk	11	(0)
1991	FC Start Yeysk	1	(0)
1991	FC Spartak Oryol	33	(0)
1992–1993	FC KAMAZ Naberezhnye Chelny	34	(0)
- * Club domestic league appearances and goals

Vladimir Viktorovich Pivtsov (Russian: Владимир Викторович Пивцов; born 26 March 1960) is a former Russian professional footballer.

== Club career ==
He made his professional debut in the Soviet Second League in 1980 for FShM Moscow.

== Honours ==
- Soviet Cup finalist: 1982.
