= Gennady Smirnov =

Russian footballer

Personal information
- Full name: Gennady Mikhailovich Smirnov
- Date of birth: 16 January 1955
- Place of birth: Saratov, Soviet Union
- Date of death: 2 September 2000 (aged 45)
- Place of death: Saratov, Russia
- Height: 1.78 m (5 ft 10 in)
- Position: Striker

Senior career*
Years	Team	Apps	(Gls)
1975–1977	Sokol Saratov	63	(34)
1977	Krylia Sovetov Kyubyshev	15	(1)
1978–1979	SKA-Khabarovsk	78	(47)
1980	Spartak Moscow	1	(0)
1980–1983	Fakel Voronezh	148	(71)
1985–1986	Sokol Saratov	62	(40)
1987	Metallurg Lipetsk		
1988	Fakel Voronezh	12	(1)
1988	Navbahor Namangan	16	(12)
1989	Khimik Semiluki	9	(1)
1989	Sakhalin Kholmsk	14	(5)
1990	SKA-Khabarovsk	21	(10)
1991	Vulkan Petropavlovsk-Kamchatsky	31	(7)
1992	Vorskla Poltava	2	(1)
1992	Energomash Belgorod	9	(3)
1993	Salyut Saratov	5	(1)
- * Club domestic league appearances and goals

Gennady Mikhailovich Smirnov (Russian: Геннадий Михайлович Смирнов; 16 January 1955 – 2 September 2000) was a Soviet footballer who played as a striker in the 1970s and 1980s.

== Career ==
Born in Saratov, Smirnov began playing football with local side Sokol Saratov. He scored 34 league goals for the club in just over two seasons, earning a move to Soviet Top League side Krylia Sovetov Kyubyshev in 1997. Shortly after, Smirnov entered military service and was sent to play for SKA-Khabarovsk. Over the course of three Soviet Second League seasons Smirnov scored 56 goals for SKA-Khabarovsk, scoring a club-best 27 goals in a single season, making him the club's fifth all-time leading goal-scorer.

After his success at SKA Khabarovsk, Smirnov joined Soviet Top League side Spartak Moscow, but he only made a single substitute's appearance for Spartak. His greatest successes followed as Smirnov scored 71 league goals for Soviet First League side Fakel Voronezh over the next four seasons. During his career, Smirnov scored 226 goals in the Soviet Top, First and Second Leagues, making him the fourth all-time leading goal-scorer in those three leagues.

== Personal ==
Smirnov married Elena Krestenenko, also from Saratov, when he was age 21. They had a son, Maksim, while Gennady was playing for Spartak Moscow in 1980. However, after a few seasons with Fakel Voronezh, he left his family and went home to Saratov. After he retired from playing, Smirnov struggled to find work, and he was stabbed to death by drinking companions in his apartment at age 45.

Smirnov's brother, Yuri, was a professional footballer who played for Sokol Saratov, Torpedo Moscow, CSKA Moscow, Lokomotiv Moscow and Krylia Sovetov Kyubyshev, and was a Soviet Cup-winner. His son, Maksim, played semi-professional football for FC Yelets, FC Dynamo Voronezh, FC Lokomotiv Liski and FC Metallurg-Oskol Stary Oskol.
