= Valeriy Tursunov =

Tajikistani footballer (1954–2026)

Personal information
- Full name: Valeriy Yuldashevich Tursunov
- Date of birth: 3 August 1954
- Place of birth: Tajik SSR, Soviet Union
- Date of death: 2 August 2026 (aged 71)
- Place of death: Moscow, Russia
- Position: Forward

Senior career*
Years	Team	Apps	(Gls)
1974–1988	CSKA-Pamir		
1990	Austria Klagenfurt		

Managerial career
- 1989–1991: CSKA-Pamir
- * Club domestic league appearances and goals

Valeriy Yuldashevich Tursunov (Russian: Валерий Юлдашевич Турсунов; 3 August 1954 – 2 August 2026) was a Tajikistani football player and manager.

== Early life ==
Tursunov was a native of Dushanbe, Tajikistan on 3 August 1954.

== Career ==
Tursunov played for Tajikistani side CSKA-Pamir, where he was regarded as one of the club's most important players.

== Style of play ==
Tursunov mainly operated as a forward and was described as "nimble, mobile and technical".

== Personal life and death ==
Tursunov was nicknamed the "Tajikistani Pelé" after Brazil international Pelé.

Tursunov died on 2 August 2026, a day before his 72nd birthday.
