= Football in the Soviet Union =

Overview of association football practiced in the Soviet Union

Football in Soviet Union
- Country: Soviet Union
- Governing body: Football Federation of the Soviet Union
- National team: Soviet Union national football team

National competitions
- FIFA World Cup; UEFA European Championship

Club competitions
- List: League: Top League First League Second League Women's football championship; Cup: Cup Federation Cup Women's Cup

International competitions
- Champions League; Europa League; Super Cup

Football was a popular sport in the Soviet Union, with the national football championships being one of the major annual sporting events. Youth and children competitions as a regular event started after the war and each team of masters (official designation for professional team) in the top two tiers were fielding its youth squad in separate competition. Women official competitions started only 1990, just before dissolution of the Soviet Union.

Football in the Soviet Union existed in realities of the economy and law of the Soviet Union, where the state owned all big industry and professional sports were prohibited. Instead of being professionals, athletes were made employees of either a state enterprise or a state government department, to which a sports society belonged or assigned. Therefore, in the Soviet Union existed two statuses for footballers: amateur and non-amateur.

== History ==
Before the revolution of 1917, football was quite widespread in the Russian Empire. In 1914, the Russian Football Union included representatives from 33 cities, while the number of football teams was close to two hundred and the number of registered players - five thousand. There were only two championships played and one of them was unfinished due to World War I. The All-Russian competitions were conducted among the united city teams composed of better players from each of the city's championships. Interest in football had not fallen, and after the revolution, the number of football teams continued to grow. And soon, along with urban and territorial competitions, it was decided to hold the championships of the Russian SFSR and the Soviet Union. Until 1936, teams representing cities and republics, as opposed to club teams, took part in these competitions.

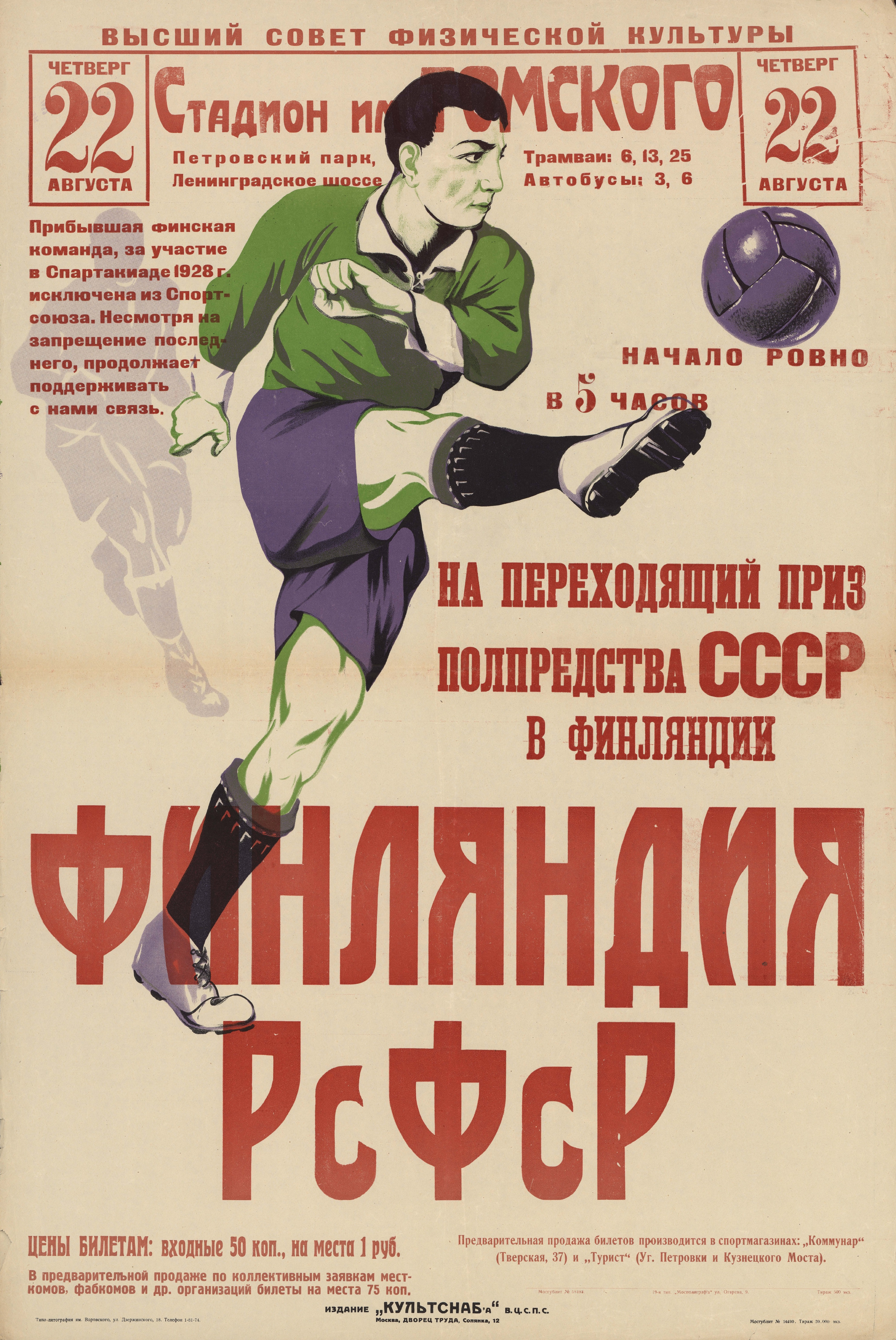
Finland — Russian SFSR football match poster, 1929

It was not until 1924 when the first All-Union championship was held. They were organized five times in total (1924, 1928, 1931, 1932 and 1935). In the first three tournaments, the team participated republics and cities, only two of the latter city.

Since 1936, the Soviet championships for club teams representing companies and institutions were held annually, and in two cases (1936, 1976) - twice a year. They were interrupted only once, during the World War II Eastern Front (locally – the Great Patriotic War). Tournaments were notable for their organizational instability. The number of participating teams was constantly changing (ranging from 7 to 26), some of the changes taking place in the course of the championship tournament. The championship tournaments lasted from 57 to 282 days, they were played in one (1936, 1938, 1952, 1976) or two rounds, there were single and multi-stage ones (1960, 1961, 1962, 1969). Changes to the scoring system were also made - during different seasons, the number of points awarded for a draw was two, one, or even none. The name of the tournament itself was also changed over the years: группа «А» (Group A), класс «А» (Class A), I группа (Group I), I группа класса «А» (Group I Class A), высшая группа класса «А» (Top Group Class A), высшая лига (Top League).

In the second half of the 1980s, leading players of the Soviet teams began to move to foreign clubs. In 1990, Dinamo Tbilisi and Žalgiris Vilnius left the competitions of the Soviet Union. Other clubs had similar intentions but these plans were not implemented before the actual collapse of the Soviet Union. In 1991, the history of the football championships of the Soviet Union ended with the victory of FC CSKA Moscow. The Commonwealth of Independent States Cup, traditionally attended by the winners of national championships from the former Soviet republics, was a reminder of the existence of the Soviet championships.

=== Competitions ===
==== League (round-robin) ====
Male

- Tier 1 – Soviet Top League (1971–1992)
  - single group with number of participant and format changing
- Tier 2 – Soviet First League (1971–1991)
  - single group for most of its history, inconsistency in number of participants and format
- Tier 3 – Buffer League (1990–1991)
  - tier three competitions were oftentimes regional based with multiple groups (zones), introduced in 1990 the buffer league reduced number of groups to slim down the competition pyramid structure
- Tier 4 – Soviet Second League (1971–1991)
- Tier 5 – Group D
  - tier five competitions existed in very early period before World War II for a short time
- Republican-level competitions
  - Each union republic had its own separate competition including the Russian SFSR and was standardized as the competitions among the "collectives of physical culture" (KFK)
- Regional-level competitions
  - competitions based on primary administrative division of the union republics including autonomous republics within those union republics as well as the federal-level cities of the Soviet Union
- Local-level competitions
  - competitions of cities and smaller administrative division of the union republics

Female

- Tier 1 – Top League (1990–1991)
- Tier 2 – First League (1990–1991)
- Tier 3 – Buffer League (1990–1991)

==== Cup (elimination) ====
- Soviet Cup
- Federation Cup
- First League Cup, other elimination-type competitions
- Soviet Women Cup

==== Unofficial ====
- Soviet Super Cup

=== Evolution of the Soviet football league system ===
Tier\Years	1924-32	1935	1936	1937	1938	1939–40	1941	1942–44	1945-46	1947-49	1950–52	1953-59	1960–62	1963-69	1970	1971-89	1990–91
1	Championsnip	Pervaya Gruppa	Gruppa A					Eastern Front; World War II	Pervaya Gruppa		Class A			Class A 1^{a} Gruppa	Class A Vysshaya Gruppa	Vysshaya Liga	
2	Republican level	Vtoraya Gruppa	Gruppa B		None	Gruppa B	None	Eastern Front; World War II	Vtoraya Gruppa		Class B			Class A 2^{a} Gruppa	Class A 1^{a} Gruppa	Pervaya Liga	
3	City level	Republican level	Gruppa V		None			Eastern Front; World War II	None					Class B	Class A 2^{a} Gruppa	Vtoraya Liga	
4	None	City level	Gruppa G		None			Eastern Front; World War II	None						Class B	None	Nizshaya Vtoraya Liga
5	None		Republican level	Gruppa D	None			Eastern Front; World War II	None								
6	None		City level	Republican level													
7+	None			City/Regional level													

== National team ==
At its peak the Soviet national team was amongst the strongest in the world. The national team's greatest achievements was winning Euro 1960 and reaching the 1966 FIFA World Cup semi finals.

== Attendances ==
The average attendance per top-flight football league season and the club with the highest average attendance:

Year	League average	Best club	Best club average
1991	11,427	Spartak Vladikavkaz	25,767
1990	13,873	Spartak Moscow	27,800
1989	18,047	Dynamo Kyiv	37,607
1988	20,831	Dynamo Kyiv	54,680
1987	26,547	Dynamo Kyiv	58,113
1986	19,658	Dinamo Tbilisi	37,153
1985	21,582	Dinamo Tbilisi	54,429
1984	19,142	Dinamo Tbilisi	57,247
1983	20,085	Shakhtar Donetsk	31,376
1982	18,317	Dinamo Tbilisi	41,153
1981	19,670	Dinamo Tbilisi	47,271
1980	20,503	Dinamo Tbilisi	45,471
1979	19,645	Dinamo Tbilisi	55,882
1978	18,125	Dinamo Tbilisi	56,867
1977	22,027	Dinamo Tbilisi	68,200
1976	18,590	Dinamo Tbilisi	29,867
1975	23,366	Dynamo Kyiv	44,867
1974	25,090	Dynamo Kyiv	42,267
1973	25,682	Ararat	56,867
1972	25,154	Zenit	39,900
1971	30,110	Dynamo Kyiv	60,667
1970	26,322	Spartak Moscow	35,875

== See also ==
For the correspondent article on each one of the republics, please see:

- Football in Armenia
- Football in Azerbaijan
- Football in Belarus
- Football in Estonia
- Football in Georgia
- Football in Kazakhstan
- Football in Kyrgyzstan
- Football in Latvia
- Football in Lithuania
- Football in Moldova
- Football in Russia
- Football in Tajikistan
- Football in Turkmenistan
- Football in Ukraine
- Football in Uzbekistan

Others:

- Football Federation of the Soviet Union
- Soviet Top League
- Soviet First League
- Soviet Cup
- Soviet Super Cup
- USSR Federation Cup
- Soviet Union national football team
