= 1982 Soviet Second League =

Second League
- Season: 1982

1982 Soviet Second League was a Soviet competition in the Soviet Second League.

== Qualifying groups ==
=== Group I [Russian SFSR] ===
Pos	Team	Pld	W	D	L	GF	GA	GD	Pts
1	Textilshchik Ivanovo	30	21	8	1	59	15	+44	50
2	Znamya Truda Orekhovo-Zuyevo	30	20	7	3	50	8	+42	47
3	Zorkiy Krasnogorsk	30	16	6	8	45	25	+20	38
4	Spartak Tambov	30	15	5	10	32	31	+1	35
5	Volga Kalinin	30	13	8	9	24	23	+1	34
6	Krasnaya Presnya Moskva	30	12	9	9	40	28	+12	33
7	Saturn Rybinsk	30	13	6	11	38	35	+3	32
8	Stroitel Cherepovets	30	13	6	11	42	37	+5	32
9	Dinamo Vologda	30	10	11	9	30	26	+4	31
10	Dinamo Kashira	30	9	9	12	34	40	−6	27
11	Spartak Ryazan	30	10	6	14	32	41	−9	26
12	Moskvich Moskva	30	8	7	15	23	39	−16	23
13	Lokomotiv Kaluga	30	6	9	15	23	36	−13	21
14	Volzhanin Kineshma	30	7	4	19	25	54	−29	18
15	TOZ Tula	30	6	6	18	24	56	−32	18
16	FSM Moskva	30	4	7	19	22	49	−27	15

=== Group II [Russian SFSR] ===
Pos	Team	Pld	W	D	L	GF	GA	GD	Pts
1	Lokomotiv Chelyabinsk	32	21	6	5	71	29	+42	48
2	Rubin Kazan	32	19	8	5	51	28	+23	46
3	Torpedo Togliatti	32	21	1	10	58	34	+24	43
4	Krylya Sovetov Kuibyshev	32	16	7	9	40	25	+15	39
5	Zvezda Perm	32	14	9	9	51	32	+19	37
6	Zenit Izhevsk	32	15	6	11	50	32	+18	36
7	Metallurg Magnitogorsk	32	14	5	13	50	43	+7	33
8	Druzhba Yoshkar-Ola	32	14	4	14	43	41	+2	32
9	UralMash Sverdlovsk	32	12	7	13	37	47	−10	31
10	Uralets Nizhniy Tagil	32	11	9	12	45	50	−5	31
11	Svetotekhnika Saransk	32	12	6	14	38	43	−5	30
12	Khimik Dzerzhinsk	32	11	6	15	36	38	−2	28
13	Turbina Naberezhnyye Chelny	32	8	10	14	34	56	−22	26
14	Gazovik Orenburg	32	11	3	18	39	58	−19	25
15	Gastello Ufa	32	7	7	18	30	55	−25	21
16	Stal Cheboksary	32	5	11	16	25	47	−22	21
17	Volga Gorkiy	32	6	5	21	36	76	−40	17

=== Group III [Russian SFSR] ===
Pos	Team	Pld	W	D	L	GF	GA	GD	Pts
1	Spartak Orjonikidze	32	22	6	4	64	18	+46	50
2	RostSelMash Rostov-na-Donu	32	19	5	8	50	24	+26	43
3	Dinamo Stavropol	32	20	2	10	54	41	+13	42
4	Dinamo Makhachkala	32	15	9	8	54	35	+19	39
5	Uralan Elista	32	15	8	9	48	32	+16	38
6	Sokol Saratov	32	13	8	11	40	41	−1	34
7	Cement Novorossiysk	32	11	12	9	38	33	+5	34
8	Atommash Volgodonsk	32	13	7	12	44	49	−5	33
9	Torpedo Taganrog	32	13	6	13	36	43	−7	32
10	Druzhba Maykop	32	12	7	13	34	35	−1	31
11	Mashuk Pyatigorsk	32	11	8	13	42	39	+3	30
12	Nart Cherkessk	32	11	7	14	39	51	−12	29
13	Terek Grozny	32	9	6	17	45	56	−11	24
14	Torpedo Volzhskiy	32	7	10	15	34	46	−12	24
15	Spartak Nalchik	32	6	10	16	42	68	−26	22
16	Volgar Astrakhan	32	6	8	18	27	53	−26	20
17	Strela Voronezh	32	5	9	18	22	49	−27	19

=== Group IV [Russian SFSR] ===
Pos	Team	Pld	W	D	L	GF	GA	GD	Pts
1	Kuzbass Kemerovo	28	18	6	4	58	22	+36	42
2	Irtysh Omsk	28	15	10	3	47	26	+21	40
3	Zvezda Irkutsk	28	14	7	7	40	31	+9	35
4	Amur Blagoveshchensk	28	13	5	10	34	37	−3	31
5	Avtomobilist Krasnoyarsk	28	12	7	9	47	31	+16	31
6	Angara Angarsk	28	12	6	10	44	39	+5	30
7	Luch Vladivostok	28	11	7	10	35	28	+7	29
8	Amur Komsomolsk-na-Amure	28	9	11	8	34	30	+4	29
9	Manometr Tomsk	28	10	8	10	34	34	0	28
10	Metallurg Novokuznetsk (Note: Zapsibovets Novokuznetsk changed name to Metallurg.)	28	10	5	13	47	49	−2	25
11	Fakel Tyumen	28	10	5	13	26	33	−7	25
12	Dinamo Barnaul	28	9	7	12	29	32	−3	25
13	Chkalovets Novosibirsk	28	8	5	15	28	49	−21	21
14	Torpedo Rubtsovsk	28	6	6	16	35	51	−16	18
15	Lokomotiv Ulan-Ude	28	4	3	21	21	67	−46	11

=== Group V (Soviet Republics) ===
Pos	Rep	Team	Pld	W	D	L	GF	GA	GD	Pts
1	BLR	Dnepr Mogilyov	30	18	8	4	60	32	+28	44
2	BLR	Khimik Grodno	30	17	6	7	43	23	+20	40
3	RUS	Dinamo Bryansk	30	17	4	9	61	42	+19	38
4	RUS	Metallurg Lipetsk	30	17	3	10	43	32	+11	37
5	MDA	Avtomobilist Tiraspol	30	15	7	8	45	22	+23	37
6	LTU	Atlantas Klaipeda	30	13	10	7	44	35	+9	36
7	BLR	GomSelMash Gomel	30	13	8	9	33	27	+6	34
8	RUS	Baltika Kaliningrad	30	13	4	13	45	44	+1	30
9	RUS	Sever Murmansk	30	10	10	10	44	41	+3	30
10	LVA	Zvejnieks Liepaja	30	11	5	14	40	50	−10	27
11	RUS	Avangard Kursk	30	9	7	14	25	48	−23	25
12	RUS	Dinamo Leningrad	30	7	9	14	33	37	−4	23
13	BLR	Dinamo Brest	30	9	4	17	30	44	−14	22
14	RUS	Spartak Oryol	30	8	6	16	32	53	−21	22
15	RUS	Salyut Belgorod	30	7	5	18	31	48	−17	19
16	BLR	Dvina Vitebsk	30	5	6	19	13	44	−31	16

=== Group VI [Ukraine] ===
Pos	Team	Pld	W	D	L	GF	GA	GD	Pts	Qualification or relegation
1	Bukovyna Chernivtsi (C, Q)	46	29	8	9	71	34	+37	66	Qualified for interzonal competitions among other Zone winners
2	Desna Chernihiv	46	26	10	10	64	37	+27	62	
3	Kolos Mezhyrich	46	26	10	10	60	39	+21	62	
4	Avanhard Rivne	46	25	11	10	65	34	+31	61	
5	Nyva Vinnytsia	46	23	13	10	69	36	+33	59	
6	Atlantyka Sevastopol	46	22	12	12	68	39	+29	56	
7	Spartak Zhytomyr	46	23	8	15	68	46	+22	54	
8	Dnipro Cherkasy	46	21	12	13	54	42	+12	54	
9	Shakhtar Horlivka	46	19	12	15	61	57	+4	50	
10	Kryvbas Kryvyi Rih	46	20	9	17	50	48	+2	49	
11	Sudnobudivnyk Mykolaiv	46	16	12	18	56	48	+8	44	
12	Metalurh Dniprodzerzhynsk	46	17	9	20	47	47	0	43	
13	Prykarpattia Ivano-Frankivsk	46	17	8	21	41	58	−17	42	
14	Torpedo Lutsk	46	16	9	21	49	60	−11	41	
15	Zirka Kirovohrad	46	17	5	24	43	63	−20	39	
16	Mayak Kharkiv	46	14	10	22	52	65	−13	38	
17	Zakarpattia Uzhhorod	46	14	8	24	37	53	−16	36	
18	Stakhonovets Stakhanov	46	13	10	23	40	54	−14	36	
19	Krystal Kherson	46	12	12	22	41	64	−23	36	
20	Podillia Khmelnytskyi	46	12	12	22	37	62	−25	36	
21	Frunzenets Sumy	46	12	12	22	38	62	−24	36	
22	Novator Zhdanov	46	13	9	24	44	60	−16	35	
23	Okean Kerch	46	12	11	23	43	67	−24	35	
24	Kolos Poltava (R)	46	10	14	22	21	44	−23	34	Relegated

(C) Champions; (Q) Qualified for the phase indicated; (R) Relegated

=== Group VII (Central Asia) ===
Pos	Rep	Team	Pld	W	D	L	GF	GA	GD	Pts
1	UZB	Dinamo Samarkand	36	25	6	5	63	19	+44	56
2	UZB	Neftyanik Fergana	36	20	10	6	59	25	+34	50
3	UZB	Novbahor Namangan	36	21	7	8	71	27	+44	49
4	UZB	Start Tashkent	36	19	5	12	41	25	+16	43
5	UZB	Horezm Yangiaryk	36	16	9	11	48	41	+7	41
6	UZB	Yangiyer	36	16	7	13	54	49	+5	39
7	UZB	Yeshlik Turakurgan	36	16	7	13	50	50	0	39
8	UZB	Hisar Shahrisabz	36	16	6	14	45	44	+1	38
9	UZB	Sohibkor Halkabad	36	16	6	14	54	46	+8	38
10	UZB	Hiva	36	14	10	12	42	49	−7	38
11	UZB	Narimanovets Bagat	36	13	12	11	42	48	−6	38
12	UZB	Shahrihanets Shahrihan	36	14	9	13	62	53	+9	37
13	UZB	Avtomobilist Termez	36	15	6	15	42	32	+10	36
14	UZB	Zarafshan Navoi	36	12	11	13	39	42	−3	35
15	TJK	Pahtakor Kurgan-Tyube	36	15	4	17	55	42	+13	34
16	KGZ	Alay Osh	36	11	5	20	41	70	−29	27
17	TJK	Hojent Leninabad	36	7	6	23	32	66	−34	20
18	UZB	Amudarya Nukus	36	7	4	25	32	71	−39	18
19	KGZ	COR Frunze	36	2	4	30	20	93	−73	8

=== Group VIII [Kazakh SSR] ===
Pos	Rep	Team	Pld	W	D	L	GF	GA	GD	Pts
1	KAZ	Shakhtyor Karaganda	36	27	5	4	90	29	+61	59
2	KAZ	Meliorator Chimkent	36	21	9	6	64	21	+43	51
3	KAZ	Khimik Jambul	36	19	8	9	66	35	+31	46
4	KAZ	Spartak Semipalatinsk	36	19	7	10	68	45	+23	45
5	KAZ	Tselinnik Tselinograd	36	17	8	11	49	35	+14	42
6	KGZ	Alga Frunze	36	16	10	10	48	31	+17	42
7	KAZ	Traktor Pavlodar	36	17	7	12	51	36	+15	41
8	KAZ	Zhetysu Taldy-Kurgan	36	16	7	13	53	48	+5	39
9	KAZ	Vostok Ust-Kamenogorsk	36	14	10	12	69	46	+23	38
10	KAZ	Ekibastuzets Ekibastuz	36	12	10	14	37	40	−3	34
11	KAZ	Bulat Temirtau	36	14	5	17	48	51	−3	33
12	KAZ	Aktyubinets Aktyubinsk	36	11	11	14	31	39	−8	33
13	KAZ	Energetik Kustanay	36	13	6	17	31	53	−22	32
14	KAZ	Meliorator Kzil-Orda	36	13	6	17	41	53	−12	32
15	KAZ	Torpedo Kokchetav	36	11	10	15	29	41	−12	32
16	KAZ	Jezkazganets Jezkazgan	36	12	7	17	36	59	−23	31
17	KAZ	Avangard Petropavlovsk	36	10	3	23	25	68	−43	23
18	KAZ	SKIF Alma-Ata	36	6	4	26	32	79	−47	16
19	KAZ	Uralets Uralsk	36	3	7	26	18	77	−59	13

=== Group IX (Caucasus) ===
Pos	Rep	Team	Pld	W	D	L	GF	GA	GD	Pts
1	ARM	Kotaik Abovyan	32	23	3	6	80	29	+51	49
2	GEO	Lokomotiv Samtredia	32	18	8	6	69	30	+39	44
3	GEO	Kolkheti Poti	32	18	5	9	61	40	+21	41
4	ARM	Shirak Leninakan	32	18	2	12	68	35	+33	38
5	GEO	Dinamo Sukhumi	32	15	8	9	38	34	+4	38
6	AZE	Hazar Lenkoran	32	15	7	10	48	35	+13	37
7	GEO	Meshakhte Tkibuli	32	17	1	14	46	44	+2	35
8	TKM	Kolhozchi Ashkhabad	32	16	3	13	55	41	+14	35
9	ARM	Spartak Oktemberyan	32	16	3	13	50	45	+5	35
10	GEO	Dinamo Batumi	32	16	2	14	56	49	+7	34
11	AZE	Avtomobilist Mingechaur	32	14	5	13	32	40	−8	33
12	AZE	Karabakh Stepanakert	32	13	7	12	48	42	+6	33
13	GEO	Dila Gori	32	9	6	17	38	60	−22	24
14	AZE	Araz Nahichevan	32	9	4	19	27	60	−33	22
15	GEO	Lokomotiv Tbilisi	32	8	6	18	34	63	−29	22
16	ARM	Olimpia Artashat	32	4	8	20	33	67	−34	16
17	AZE	Kyapaz Kirovabad (Note: Progress Kirovabad changed name to Kyapaz.)	32	3	2	27	24	93	−69	8

== Final group stage ==
[Oct 26 – Nov 19]

=== Group A ===
Pos	Rep	Team	Pld	W	D	L	GF	GA	GD	Pts	Promotion
1	RUS	Textilshchik Ivanovo	4	2	1	1	5	4	+1	5	Promoted
2	RUS	Spartak Orjonikidze	4	1	2	1	5	4	+1	4	
3	ARM	Kotaik Abovyan	4	1	1	2	3	5	−2	3	

=== Group B ===
Pos	Rep	Team	Pld	W	D	L	GF	GA	GD	Pts	Promotion
1	BLR	Dnepr Mogilyov	4	3	0	1	8	4	+4	6	Promoted
2	UZB	Dinamo Samarkand	4	2	0	2	8	7	+1	4	
3	UKR	Bukovina Chernovtsy	4	1	0	3	5	10	−5	2	

=== Group C ===
Pos	Rep	Team	Pld	W	D	L	GF	GA	GD	Pts	Promotion
1	RUS	Kuzbass Kemerovo	4	3	1	0	9	3	+6	6 (Note: -1 point deducted?)	Promoted
2	KAZ	Shakhtyor Karaganda	4	1	1	2	4	5	−1	3	
3	RUS	Lokomotiv Chelyabinsk	4	1	0	3	2	7	−5	2	

Source: rsssf.com
