= 1983 Soviet Second League =

Soviet football league season

Second League
- Season: 1983

1983 Soviet Second League was a Soviet competition in the Soviet Second League.

== Qualifying groups ==
=== Group I [Russian Federation] ===
| Pos | Team | Pld | W | D | L | GF | GA | GD | Pts |
|---|---|---|---|---|---|---|---|---|---|
| 1 | Znamya Truda Orekhovo-Zuyevo | 30 | 19 | 8 | 3 | 54 | 17 | +37 | 46 |
| 2 | Krasnaya Presnya Moskva | 30 | 16 | 9 | 5 | 53 | 23 | +30 | 41 |
| 3 | Spartak Kostroma | 30 | 16 | 9 | 5 | 48 | 24 | +24 | 41 |
| 4 | Dinamo Vologda | 30 | 16 | 8 | 6 | 52 | 33 | +19 | 40 |
| 5 | Svetotekhnika Saransk | 30 | 13 | 9 | 8 | 36 | 28 | +8 | 35 |
| 6 | Zarya Kaluga (Note: Lokomotiv Kaluga changed name to Zarya.) | 30 | 14 | 5 | 11 | 45 | 31 | +14 | 33 |
| 7 | Stroitel Cherepovets | 30 | 11 | 10 | 9 | 38 | 36 | +2 | 32 |
| 8 | Zorkiy Krasnogorsk | 30 | 12 | 7 | 11 | 34 | 26 | +8 | 31 |
| 9 | Dinamo Kashira | 30 | 13 | 4 | 13 | 40 | 37 | +3 | 30 |
| 10 | Spartak Tambov | 30 | 10 | 7 | 13 | 33 | 43 | −10 | 27 |
| 11 | TOZ Tula | 30 | 9 | 9 | 12 | 27 | 31 | −4 | 27 |
| 12 | Spartak Ryazan | 30 | 11 | 3 | 16 | 34 | 58 | −24 | 25 |
| 13 | Volga Kalinin | 30 | 9 | 7 | 14 | 28 | 38 | −10 | 25 |
| 14 | Saturn Rybinsk | 30 | 5 | 10 | 15 | 16 | 33 | −17 | 20 |
| 15 | Volzhanin Kineshma | 30 | 5 | 8 | 17 | 21 | 57 | −36 | 18 |
| 16 | FSM Moskva | 30 | 3 | 3 | 24 | 17 | 61 | −44 | 9 |

=== Group II [Russian Federation] ===
| Pos | Team | Pld | W | D | L | GF | GA | GD | Pts |
|---|---|---|---|---|---|---|---|---|---|
| 1 | Krylya Sovetov Kuibyshev | 28 | 19 | 8 | 1 | 49 | 18 | +31 | 46 |
| 2 | Metallurg Magnitogorsk | 28 | 14 | 6 | 8 | 56 | 30 | +26 | 34 |
| 3 | Lokomotiv Chelyabinsk | 28 | 13 | 8 | 7 | 41 | 23 | +18 | 34 |
| 4 | Zenit Izhevsk | 28 | 13 | 7 | 8 | 39 | 22 | +17 | 33 |
| 5 | Rubin Kazan | 28 | 11 | 10 | 7 | 35 | 27 | +8 | 32 |
| 6 | Khimik Dzerzhinsk | 28 | 12 | 7 | 9 | 30 | 26 | +4 | 31 |
| 7 | Zvezda Perm | 28 | 12 | 6 | 10 | 36 | 27 | +9 | 30 |
| 8 | Turbina Naberezhnyye Chelny | 28 | 11 | 6 | 11 | 24 | 37 | −13 | 28 |
| 9 | Uralets Nizhniy Tagil | 28 | 9 | 8 | 11 | 29 | 30 | −1 | 26 |
| 10 | UralMash Sverdlovsk | 28 | 8 | 10 | 10 | 29 | 29 | 0 | 26 |
| 11 | Stal Cheboksary | 28 | 9 | 7 | 12 | 31 | 38 | −7 | 25 |
| 12 | Torpedo Togliatti | 28 | 9 | 5 | 14 | 26 | 31 | −5 | 23 |
| 13 | Druzhba Yoshkar-Ola | 28 | 7 | 7 | 14 | 29 | 46 | −17 | 21 |
| 14 | Gastello Ufa | 28 | 8 | 4 | 16 | 26 | 55 | −29 | 20 |
| 15 | Volga Gorkiy | 28 | 3 | 5 | 20 | 11 | 52 | −41 | 11 |

=== Group III [Russian Federation] ===
| Pos | Team | Pld | W | D | L | GF | GA | GD | Pts |
|---|---|---|---|---|---|---|---|---|---|
| 1 | Spartak Orjonikidze | 30 | 23 | 2 | 5 | 69 | 23 | +46 | 48 |
| 2 | RostSelMash Rostov-na-Donu | 30 | 20 | 3 | 7 | 65 | 31 | +34 | 43 |
| 3 | Dinamo Stavropol | 30 | 19 | 5 | 6 | 61 | 27 | +34 | 43 |
| 4 | Uralan Elista | 30 | 18 | 4 | 8 | 57 | 35 | +22 | 40 |
| 5 | Mashuk Pyatigorsk | 30 | 17 | 4 | 9 | 52 | 34 | +18 | 38 |
| 6 | Sokol Saratov | 30 | 11 | 10 | 9 | 34 | 32 | +2 | 32 |
| 7 | Cement Novorossiysk | 30 | 13 | 5 | 12 | 35 | 34 | +1 | 31 |
| 8 | Dinamo Makhachkala | 30 | 12 | 6 | 12 | 48 | 40 | +8 | 30 |
| 9 | Terek Grozny | 30 | 11 | 6 | 13 | 43 | 45 | −2 | 28 |
| 10 | Torpedo Taganrog | 30 | 12 | 2 | 16 | 39 | 53 | −14 | 26 |
| 11 | Spartak Nalchik | 30 | 10 | 6 | 14 | 37 | 48 | −11 | 26 |
| 12 | Torpedo Volzhskiy | 30 | 8 | 9 | 13 | 38 | 55 | −17 | 25 |
| 13 | Atommash Volgodonsk | 30 | 10 | 3 | 17 | 37 | 49 | −12 | 23 |
| 14 | Nart Cherkessk | 30 | 7 | 5 | 18 | 24 | 53 | −29 | 19 |
| 15 | Druzhba Maykop | 30 | 5 | 7 | 18 | 24 | 55 | −31 | 17 |
| 16 | Volgar Astrakhan | 30 | 2 | 7 | 21 | 16 | 65 | −49 | 11 |

=== Group IV [Russian Federation] ===
| Pos | Team | Pld | W | D | L | GF | GA | GD | Pts |
|---|---|---|---|---|---|---|---|---|---|
| 1 | Irtysh Omsk | 26 | 15 | 7 | 4 | 44 | 21 | +23 | 37 |
| 2 | Geolog Tyumen (Note: Fakel Tyumen changed name to Geolog.) | 26 | 14 | 6 | 6 | 46 | 21 | +25 | 34 |
| 3 | Avtomobilist Krasnoyarsk | 26 | 10 | 12 | 4 | 23 | 14 | +9 | 32 |
| 4 | Dinamo Barnaul | 26 | 15 | 0 | 11 | 43 | 37 | +6 | 30 |
| 5 | Luch Vladivostok | 26 | 11 | 7 | 8 | 33 | 34 | −1 | 29 |
| 6 | Metallurg Novokuznetsk | 26 | 13 | 2 | 11 | 40 | 36 | +4 | 28 |
| 7 | Zvezda Irkutsk | 26 | 10 | 6 | 10 | 39 | 41 | −2 | 26 |
| 8 | Manometr Tomsk | 26 | 10 | 6 | 10 | 25 | 33 | −8 | 26 |
| 9 | Amur Blagoveshchensk | 26 | 10 | 5 | 11 | 38 | 43 | −5 | 25 |
| 10 | Angara Angarsk | 26 | 10 | 4 | 12 | 38 | 34 | +4 | 24 |
| 11 | Torpedo Rubtsovsk | 26 | 8 | 8 | 10 | 36 | 34 | +2 | 24 |
| 12 | Amur Komsomolsk-na-Amure | 26 | 7 | 6 | 13 | 24 | 31 | −7 | 20 |
| 13 | Lokomotiv Ulan-Ude | 26 | 7 | 6 | 13 | 25 | 39 | −14 | 20 |
| 14 | Chkalovets Novosibirsk | 26 | 3 | 3 | 20 | 23 | 59 | −36 | 9 |

=== Group V (Soviet Republics) ===
| Pos | Rep | Team | Pld | W | D | L | GF | GA | GD | Pts |
|---|---|---|---|---|---|---|---|---|---|---|
| 1 | RUS | Metallurg Lipetsk | 32 | 21 | 9 | 2 | 57 | 15 | +42 | 51 |
| 2 | RUS | Dinamo Bryansk | 32 | 18 | 7 | 7 | 54 | 34 | +20 | 43 |
| 3 | BLR | Khimik Grodno | 32 | 15 | 11 | 6 | 35 | 19 | +16 | 41 |
| 4 | MDA | Avtomobilist Tiraspol | 32 | 17 | 6 | 9 | 50 | 30 | +20 | 40 |
| 5 | RUS | Salyut Belgorod | 32 | 13 | 10 | 9 | 39 | 30 | +9 | 36 |
| 6 | LTU | Atlantas Klaipeda | 32 | 13 | 9 | 10 | 44 | 37 | +7 | 35 |
| 7 | RUS | Spartak Oryol | 32 | 14 | 5 | 13 | 45 | 32 | +13 | 33 |
| 8 | BLR | GomSelMash Gomel | 32 | 12 | 8 | 12 | 40 | 39 | +1 | 32 |
| 9 | BLR | Dinamo Brest | 32 | 10 | 10 | 12 | 41 | 36 | +5 | 30 |
| 10 | BLR | Dvina Vitebsk | 32 | 9 | 11 | 12 | 28 | 42 | −14 | 29 |
| 11 | LVA | Zvejnieks Liepaja | 32 | 10 | 7 | 15 | 44 | 57 | −13 | 27 |
| 12 | RUS | Strela Voronezh | 32 | 11 | 4 | 17 | 47 | 64 | −17 | 26 |
| 13 | RUS | Sever Murmansk | 32 | 10 | 6 | 16 | 34 | 51 | −17 | 26 |
| 14 | RUS | Dinamo Leningrad | 32 | 10 | 6 | 16 | 29 | 40 | −11 | 26 |
| 15 | RUS | Avangard Kursk | 32 | 7 | 11 | 14 | 30 | 44 | −14 | 25 |
| 16 | EST | SVSM Tallinn | 32 | 7 | 10 | 15 | 36 | 57 | −21 | 24 |
| 17 | RUS | Baltika Kaliningrad | 32 | 6 | 8 | 18 | 38 | 64 | −26 | 20 |

=== Group VI [Ukraine] ===
| Pos | Team | Pld | W | D | L | GF | GA | GD | Pts | Qualification or relegation |
|---|---|---|---|---|---|---|---|---|---|---|
| 1 | SKA Kiev (C, Q) | 50 | 28 | 16 | 6 | 91 | 49 | +42 | 72 | Qualified for interzonal competitions among other Zone winners |
| 2 | Kolos Mezhyrich | 50 | 30 | 10 | 10 | 99 | 45 | +54 | 70 | |
| 3 | Nyva Vinnytsia | 50 | 29 | 11 | 10 | 86 | 44 | +42 | 69 | |
| 4 | SKA Odessa | 50 | 27 | 11 | 12 | 66 | 29 | +37 | 65 | |
| 5 | Kryvbas Kryvyi Rih | 50 | 23 | 18 | 9 | 70 | 44 | +26 | 64 | |
| 6 | Bukovyna Chernivtsi | 50 | 23 | 14 | 13 | 79 | 52 | +27 | 60 | |
| 7 | Spartak Zhytomyr | 50 | 21 | 14 | 15 | 66 | 50 | +16 | 56 | |
| 8 | Avanhard Rivne | 50 | 19 | 16 | 15 | 56 | 59 | −3 | 54 | |
| 9 | Shakhtar Horlivka | 50 | 20 | 13 | 17 | 56 | 55 | +1 | 53 | |
| 10 | Zakarpattia Uzhhorod | 50 | 20 | 11 | 19 | 67 | 64 | +3 | 51 | |
| 11 | Torpedo Lutsk | 50 | 20 | 9 | 21 | 66 | 71 | −5 | 49 | |
| 12 | Metalurh Dniprodzerzhynsk | 50 | 17 | 14 | 19 | 35 | 39 | −4 | 48 | |
| 13 | Nyva Berezhany | 50 | 15 | 18 | 17 | 41 | 51 | −10 | 48 | |
| 14 | Atlantyka Sevastopol | 50 | 17 | 13 | 20 | 53 | 50 | +3 | 47 | |
| 15 | Podillia Khmelnytskyi | 50 | 18 | 10 | 22 | 56 | 67 | −11 | 46 | |
| 16 | Krystal Kherson | 50 | 17 | 10 | 23 | 45 | 55 | −10 | 44 | |
| 17 | Zirka Kirovohrad | 50 | 15 | 14 | 21 | 48 | 56 | −8 | 44 | |
| 18 | Novator Zhdanov | 50 | 14 | 15 | 21 | 43 | 56 | −13 | 43 | |
| 19 | Okean Kerch | 50 | 13 | 16 | 21 | 44 | 58 | −14 | 42 | |
| 20 | Mayak Kharkiv | 50 | 15 | 11 | 24 | 54 | 72 | −18 | 41 | |
| 21 | Stakhonovets Stakhanov | 50 | 12 | 17 | 21 | 39 | 64 | −25 | 41 | |
| 22 | Prykarpattia Ivano-Frankivsk | 50 | 17 | 6 | 27 | 54 | 76 | −22 | 40 | |
| 23 | Desna Chernihiv | 50 | 16 | 8 | 26 | 50 | 66 | −16 | 40 | |
| 24 | Sudnobudivnyk Mykolaiv | 50 | 15 | 10 | 25 | 49 | 77 | −28 | 40 | |
| 25 | Dnipro Cherkasy | 50 | 13 | 13 | 24 | 35 | 61 | −26 | 39 | |
| 26 | Frunzenets Sumy (R) | 50 | 11 | 12 | 27 | 47 | 85 | −38 | 34 | Relegated |

(C) Champions; (Q) Qualified for the phase indicated; (R) Relegated

=== Group VII (Central Asia) ===
| Pos | Rep | Team | Pld | W | D | L | GF | GA | GD | Pts |
|---|---|---|---|---|---|---|---|---|---|---|
| 1 | UZB | Neftyanik Fergana | 40 | 29 | 9 | 2 | 106 | 30 | +76 | 67 |
| 2 | KGZ | Alga Frunze | 40 | 28 | 4 | 8 | 98 | 41 | +57 | 60 |
| 3 | UZB | Dinamo Samarkand | 40 | 22 | 8 | 10 | 70 | 45 | +25 | 52 |
| 4 | UZB | Novbahor Namangan | 40 | 20 | 11 | 9 | 71 | 40 | +31 | 51 |
| 5 | UZB | Avtomobilist Termez | 40 | 21 | 6 | 13 | 74 | 46 | +28 | 48 |
| 6 | UZB | Yeshlik Turakurgan | 40 | 21 | 4 | 15 | 60 | 47 | +13 | 46 |
| 7 | UZB | Narimanovets Bagat | 40 | 19 | 8 | 13 | 58 | 50 | +8 | 46 |
| 8 | TJK | Hojent Leninabad | 40 | 19 | 8 | 13 | 63 | 45 | +18 | 46 |
| 9 | UZB | Start Tashkent | 40 | 20 | 5 | 15 | 56 | 38 | +18 | 45 |
| 10 | TJK | Pahtakor Kurgan-Tyube | 40 | 18 | 8 | 14 | 72 | 41 | +31 | 44 |
| 11 | UZB | Yangiyer | 40 | 18 | 7 | 15 | 54 | 45 | +9 | 43 |
| 12 | UZB | Zarafshan Navoi | 40 | 17 | 8 | 15 | 55 | 56 | −1 | 42 |
| 13 | UZB | Hiva | 40 | 18 | 5 | 17 | 67 | 59 | +8 | 41 |
| 14 | UZB | Sohibkor Halkabad | 40 | 14 | 12 | 14 | 63 | 48 | +15 | 40 |
| 15 | UZB | Beshkent | 40 | 16 | 5 | 19 | 63 | 70 | −7 | 37 |
| 16 | UZB | Hisar Shahrisabz | 40 | 12 | 8 | 20 | 58 | 84 | −26 | 32 |
| 17 | UZB | Shahrihanets Shahrihan | 40 | 12 | 7 | 21 | 61 | 76 | −15 | 31 |
| 18 | UZB | Horezm Yangiaryk | 40 | 10 | 7 | 23 | 27 | 79 | −52 | 27 |
| 19 | KGZ | Alay Osh | 40 | 10 | 6 | 24 | 43 | 76 | −33 | 26 |
| 20 | UZB | Amudarya Nukus | 40 | 5 | 2 | 33 | 31 | 108 | −77 | 12 |
| 21 | KGZ | COR Frunze | 40 | 0 | 4 | 36 | 15 | 141 | −126 | 4 |

=== Group VIII [Kazakhstan] ===
| Pos | Team | Pld | W | D | L | GF | GA | GD | Pts |
|---|---|---|---|---|---|---|---|---|---|
| 1 | Shakhtyor Karaganda | 32 | 22 | 5 | 5 | 70 | 32 | +38 | 49 |
| 2 | Traktor Pavlodar | 32 | 18 | 10 | 4 | 67 | 23 | +44 | 46 |
| 3 | Meliorator Chimkent | 32 | 18 | 8 | 6 | 65 | 24 | +41 | 44 |
| 4 | Spartak Semipalatinsk | 32 | 16 | 11 | 5 | 50 | 26 | +24 | 43 |
| 5 | Tselinnik Tselinograd | 32 | 19 | 3 | 10 | 52 | 36 | +16 | 41 |
| 6 | Zhetysu Taldy-Kurgan | 32 | 14 | 8 | 10 | 47 | 45 | +2 | 36 |
| 7 | Khimik Jambul | 32 | 13 | 10 | 9 | 52 | 39 | +13 | 36 |
| 8 | Bulat Temirtau | 32 | 11 | 10 | 11 | 43 | 39 | +4 | 32 |
| 9 | Jezkazganets Jezkazgan | 32 | 11 | 8 | 13 | 44 | 47 | −3 | 30 |
| 10 | Torpedo Kokchetav | 32 | 10 | 10 | 12 | 36 | 50 | −14 | 30 |
| 11 | Aktyubinets Aktyubinsk | 32 | 13 | 3 | 16 | 31 | 40 | −9 | 29 |
| 12 | Vostok Ust-Kamenogorsk | 32 | 12 | 5 | 15 | 61 | 54 | +7 | 29 |
| 13 | Ekibastuzets Ekibastuz | 32 | 10 | 8 | 14 | 27 | 44 | −17 | 28 |
| 14 | Energetik Kustanay | 32 | 9 | 5 | 18 | 39 | 59 | −20 | 23 |
| 15 | Avangard Petropavlovsk | 32 | 8 | 4 | 20 | 27 | 54 | −27 | 20 |
| 16 | Meliorator Kzil-Orda | 32 | 7 | 6 | 19 | 38 | 60 | −22 | 20 |
| 17 | SKIF Alma-Ata | 32 | 2 | 4 | 26 | 25 | 102 | −77 | 8 |

=== Group IX (Caucasus) ===
| Pos | Rep | Team | Pld | W | D | L | GF | GA | GD | Pts |
|---|---|---|---|---|---|---|---|---|---|---|
| 1 | GEO | Dinamo Batumi | 32 | 21 | 5 | 6 | 70 | 23 | +47 | 47 |
| 2 | ARM | Kotaik Abovyan | 32 | 18 | 10 | 4 | 72 | 40 | +32 | 46 |
| 3 | GEO | Kolkheti Poti | 32 | 18 | 6 | 8 | 61 | 41 | +20 | 42 |
| 4 | GEO | Lokomotiv Samtredia | 32 | 16 | 6 | 10 | 47 | 27 | +20 | 38 |
| 5 | TKM | Kolhozchi Ashkhabad | 32 | 16 | 5 | 11 | 53 | 40 | +13 | 37 |
| 6 | GEO | Meshakhte Tkibuli | 32 | 16 | 4 | 12 | 47 | 41 | +6 | 36 |
| 7 | GEO | Mertskhali Makharadze | 32 | 16 | 4 | 12 | 36 | 32 | +4 | 36 |
| 8 | GEO | Dila Gori | 32 | 15 | 5 | 12 | 48 | 44 | +4 | 35 |
| 9 | ARM | Shirak Leninakan | 32 | 13 | 5 | 14 | 47 | 46 | +1 | 31 |
| 10 | AZE | Karabakh Stepanakert | 32 | 13 | 5 | 14 | 40 | 39 | +1 | 31 |
| 11 | AZE | Hazar Lenkoran | 32 | 12 | 7 | 13 | 41 | 53 | −12 | 31 |
| 12 | GEO | Dinamo Sukhumi | 32 | 12 | 6 | 14 | 38 | 42 | −4 | 30 |
| 13 | AZE | Kyapaz Kirovabad | 32 | 12 | 5 | 15 | 49 | 58 | −9 | 29 |
| 14 | ARM | Spartak Oktemberyan | 32 | 10 | 2 | 20 | 35 | 49 | −14 | 22 |
| 15 | AZE | Avtomobilist Mingechaur | 32 | 7 | 6 | 19 | 37 | 66 | −29 | 20 |
| 16 | AZE | Araz Nahichevan | 32 | 6 | 5 | 21 | 32 | 75 | −43 | 17 |
| 17 | ARM | Olimpia Artashat | 32 | 5 | 6 | 21 | 29 | 66 | −37 | 16 |

== Final group stage ==
[Oct 23 – Nov 12]

=== Group A ===
| Pos | Rep | Team | Pld | W | D | L | GF | GA | GD | Pts | Promotion |
|---|---|---|---|---|---|---|---|---|---|---|---|
| 1 | RUS | Irtysh Omsk | 4 | 3 | 0 | 1 | 6 | 2 | +4 | 6 | Promoted |
| 2 | RUS | Metallurg Lipetsk | 4 | 2 | 0 | 2 | 4 | 7 | −3 | 4 | |
| 3 | UKR | SKA Kiev | 4 | 1 | 0 | 3 | 6 | 7 | −1 | 2 | |

=== Group B ===
| Pos | Rep | Team | Pld | W | D | L | GF | GA | GD | Pts | Promotion |
|---|---|---|---|---|---|---|---|---|---|---|---|
| 1 | RUS | Spartak Orjonikidze | 4 | 1 | 3 | 0 | 2 | 0 | +2 | 5 | Promoted |
| 2 | RUS | Znamya Truda Orekhovo-Zuyevo | 4 | 1 | 2 | 1 | 2 | 3 | −1 | 4 | |
| 3 | KAZ | Shakhtyor Karaganda | 4 | 1 | 1 | 2 | 3 | 4 | −1 | 3 | |

=== Group C ===
| Pos | Rep | Team | Pld | W | D | L | GF | GA | GD | Pts | Promotion |
|---|---|---|---|---|---|---|---|---|---|---|---|
| 1 | GEO | Dinamo Batumi | 4 | 2 | 1 | 1 | 4 | 1 | +3 | 5 | Promoted |
| 2 | RUS | Krylya Sovetov Kuibyshev | 4 | 2 | 1 | 1 | 3 | 3 | 0 | 5 | |
| 3 | UZB | Neftyanik Fergana | 4 | 0 | 2 | 2 | 1 | 4 | −3 | 2 | |

Source: rsssf.com
