= Draw limit =

Draw limit is a restriction on number of games drawn in a season. It was an administrative measure in league football competitions that was implemented in the Soviet Union by the Football Federation of the Soviet Union in 1978 to 1988.

The reason for such measure was to fight match fixing as well as increase the entertainment and intensity of the national championship. The limit provided that over certain set number of allowed draws no points were awarded for any additional drawn games. For example, if the Federation set the draw limit at 10 for a given championship, points were awarded to teams only for the first 10 drawn games and none for any additional.

== Origin ==
What led to such phenomena was a scientific approach towards football, search for variety of methods that would allow to win strictly prudently without risk. Especially such approach gained strength in the Soviet football in 1970s (see also UEFA coefficients#History). There appeared a whole group of coaches who have striven to build the game of their teams "scholarly", football was firmly seized by pragmatism and calculation. Scientists of football have estimated that for winning the first place in round robin tournament it is necessary as a rule to gain 75% of points: such result was formed, for example, when to win all home games and to draw the away games. From here two models were invented: away and home. Thereby a percent of draws in championships gradually started to grow and in the 1977 championship grew to 44.6%. For the first time started to talk about match fixing and in 1978 in order to deal with match fixing there was imposed a limit on the games drawn which there could have been eight (later 10) in one season. At first it seemed that the given decision was beneficial and the percent of draws dropped in the following championship, but the problem of match fixing was left unresolved in fact.

== Implementation ==
Draw limit was active in the Soviet championships in 1978-1988 for 11 seasons. Vietnam also used that in the V.League in 1986 and 1987, but only in Phase One.
