= FC Kuzbass Kemerovo =

- Full name: Football Club Kuzbass Kemerovo
- Founded: 1946
- Dissolved: 2012
- Ground: Shakhtyor Stadium
- Capacity: 4,174
- Chairman: Igor Lysenko
- Manager: Eduard Momotov
Home colours	Away colours

FC Kuzbass Kemerovo (Russian: ФК «Кузбасс» Кемерово) was an association football club from Kemerovo, Russia, founded in 1946. It played professionally in 1946, 1948–1949, 1957–2002 and from 2005 to 2012, when it was dissolved. The highest level it achieved was the second-highest Soviet First League and Russian First Division, where it played in 1948–1949, 1957–1962, 1966–1969, 1971, 1973–1981, 1983–1990 and 1992–1993.

== Team name history ==
- 1946 Azot Kemerovo
- 1947–1956 Khimik Kemerovo
- 1957 Shakhtyor Kemerovo
- 1958–1965 Khimik Kemerovo
- 1966–2000 Kuzbass Kemerovo
- 2001–2002 Kuzbass-Dynamo Kemerovo
- 2003 SibOVV Kemerovo
- 2004–2007 Kuzbass-Dynamo Kemerovo
- 2008–present Kuzbass Kemerovo
