= FC Iskra Smolensk =

- Full name: Football Club Iskra Smolensk
- Founded: 1937
- Ground: SGUS Stadium
- Capacity: 2,000
- Manager: Ivan Zenkin
- League: Russian Second League B Group 1
- 2025: Russian Amateur Football League, Zone Center, 4th (promoted)
- Website: vk.com/pfciskra67

FC Iskra Smolensk (Russian: «Искра» (Смоленск)) is a Russian football team from Smolensk.

== Club history ==
Iskra played professionally in 1937 and from 1960 to 1994. In 1995 it merged with FC Kristall Smolensk. They played on the second-highest level in the Soviet First League in 1960–1962 and in 1980–1986. Their best result there was 7th place in 1981. In 2026, a Smolensk team that played in the Russian Amateur Football League under a different name was renamed to Iskra and licensed for the fourth-tier Russian Second League Division B.

== Team name history ==
=== Original club ===
- 1937: DKA Smolensk
- 1938–1959: FC Dynamo Smolensk
- 1960: FC Tekstilshchik Smolensk
- 1961–1964: FC Spartak Smolensk
- 1965–1995: FC Iskra Smolensk

=== Current club ===
- 2002–2003: FC Lepton-SGAFK Smolensk
- 2004–2008: FC Lepton-SGAFKT Smolensk
- 2009–2015: FC Kameya-SGAFKSiT Smolensk
- 2016–2021: FC Kameya-SGAFKST Smolensk
- 2021–2023: FC Kameya-SGUS Smolensk
- 2024–2025: FC Universitet Sporta Smolensk
- 2026–: FC Iskra Smolensk

== Current squad ==
As of 11 September 2026, according to the Second League website.

Note: Flags indicate national team as defined under FIFA eligibility rules; some limited exceptions apply. Players may hold more than one non-FIFA nationality.

No.	Pos.	Nation	Player
1	GK	RUS	Andrey Grimanov
2	DF	RUS	Ivan Korotkov
5	MF	RUS	Ivan Anisimov
6	MF	RUS	Yegor Kindyukhin
7	MF	RUS	Mikhail Vasilyev
8	MF	RUS	Grigory Stepanov
9	MF	RUS	Nikita Dutyshev
10	FW	RUS	Yegor Shapovalov
11	FW	RUS	Stanislav Shunelev
12	DF	RUS	Rostislav Polyakov
14	FW	RUS	Daniil Konovalov
16	GK	RUS	Anton Muravchenkov
17	MF	RUS	Stanislav Kozyrev

No.	Pos.	Nation	Player
18	DF	RUS	Ivan Ignatyev
19	MF	RUS	Ruslan Sabirov
20	DF	RUS	Kirill Gorlachev
21	DF	RUS	Aleksandr Radzevsky
22	DF	RUS	Kirill Korzhakov
23	DF	RUS	Dmitry Kondrashov
24	MF	RUS	Kirill Sechkin
25	FW	RUS	Nikolay Veretennikov
26	MF	RUS	Dmitry Ikovanyuk
28	FW	RUS	Vladislav Sokolov
29	FW	RUS	Roman Polkovnikov
30	MF	RUS	Nikita Konstantinov
35	GK	RUS	Nikita Turkin
