= 1988 Soviet Cup final =

- Event: 1987-88 Soviet Cup
Torpedo Moscow	Metalist Kharkiv
0	2
- Date: 28 May 1988
- Venue: Dynamo Stadium, Moscow
- Referee: I.Timoshenko (Rostov-na-Donu)
- Attendance: 30,000

The 1988 Soviet Cup final was a football match that took place at the Lenin's Central Stadium, Moscow on May 28, 1988. The match was the 47th Soviet Cup Final and it was contested by FC Metalist Kharkiv and FC Torpedo Moscow. The Soviet Cup winner Metalist qualified for the Cup Winners' Cup first round for the Soviet Union. The last year defending holders Dynamo Kyiv were eliminated in the second round of the competition by FC Rotor Volgograd (3:2, 0:2). For Metalist this was their second final total and second in five years. For Torpedo it was their 13th Cup Final and the seventh loss at this stage.

== Road to Moscow ==
All sixteen Soviet Top League clubs did not have to go through qualification to get into the competition, so Metalist and Torpedo both qualified for the competition automatically.

Torpedo Moscow
Round 1 (1st leg)	Torpedo	1–1	FK Atlantas
Round 1 (2nd leg)	FK Atlantas	0–1	Torpedo
	(Torpedo won 2–1 on aggregate)		
Round 2 (1st leg)	CSKA	1–0	Torpedo
Round 2 (2nd leg)	Torpedo	4–0	CSKA
	(Torpedo won 4–1 on aggregate)		
Quarter-final	Torpedo	1–0	Spartak
Semi-final	Torpedo	1–0	Dnipro

Metalist Kharkiv
Round 1 (1st leg)	Metalist	3–1	Krasnaya Presnia
Round 1 (2nd leg)	Krasnaya Presnia	1–1	Metalist
	(Metalist won 4–2 on aggregate)		
Round 2 (1st leg)	Metalist	0–1	Dynamo S.
Round 2 (2nd leg)	Dynamo S.	1–1	Metalist
	(Metalist won 2–1 on aggregate)		
Quarter-final	Metalist	1–0	Rotor
Semi-final	Zalgiris	1–2	Metalist

== Previous Encounters ==
Previously they only met six times with Torpedo winning four and Metalist once, the goals were 6 to 2 respectively. The very first time they met each other on July 26, 1936, at the Round of 16 when Torpedo (then - ZiS) playing home was victorious 2:0 (Metalist was called as KhPZ). The last encounter was three seasons ago when in the first round Torpedo once again defeated Metalist in overtime playing at home.

== Match details ==
1988-05-28
?:? LST

Torpedo Moscow	0 – 2	Metalist Kharkiv
	Report	Adzhoyev 42' (pen.); Baranov 61'

Dynamo Stadium, Moscow
Attendance: 30,000
Referee: I.Timoshenko (Rostov-na-Donu)

FC Torpedo Moscow
FC Metalist Kharkiv

FC Torpedo Moscow:
GK	(Tajik Soviet Socialist Republic) Valeri Sarychev
DF	(Russian Soviet Federative Socialist Republic) Aleksandr Polukarov
DF	(Russian Soviet Federative Socialist Republic) Valentin Kovach
DF	(Russian Soviet Federative Socialist Republic) Sergei Prigoda
DF	(Russian Soviet Federative Socialist Republic) Vadim Rogovskoy
MF	(Russian Soviet Federative Socialist Republic) Aleksei Yeryomenko	(substituted off) 48'
FW	(Russian Soviet Federative Socialist Republic) Vladimir Kobzev
MF	(Russian Soviet Federative Socialist Republic) Andrei Rudakov	(substituted off) 38'
MF	(Russian Soviet Federative Socialist Republic) Nikolai Savichev	(substituted off) 63'
FW	(Tajik Soviet Socialist Republic) Oleg Shirinbekov
FW	(Russian Soviet Federative Socialist Republic) Sergey Agashkov
Substitutes:
FW	(Russian Soviet Federative Socialist Republic) Nikolai Pisarev	(substituted in) 38'
DF
MF
MF	(Russian Soviet Federative Socialist Republic) Sergei Zhukov	(substituted in) 63'
DF	(Russian Soviet Federative Socialist Republic) Gennadi Grishin	(substituted in) 48'
DF
MF
Manager:
(Russian Soviet Federative Socialist Republic) Valentin Ivanov

FC Metalist Kharkiv:
GK	(Ukrainian Soviet Socialist Republic) Ihor Kutepov
XX	(Ukrainian Soviet Socialist Republic) Ruslan Kolokolov	(substituted off) 88'
XX	(Russian Soviet Federative Socialist Republic) Nikolay Romanchuk
DF	(Ukrainian Soviet Socialist Republic) Ivan Panchyshyn
XX	(Ukrainian Soviet Socialist Republic) Oleh Derevinskyi
XX	(Ukrainian Soviet Socialist Republic) Oleksandr Ivanov	(substituted off) 79'
MF	(Ukrainian Soviet Socialist Republic) Leonid Buryak
MF	(Russian Soviet Federative Socialist Republic) Viktor Vashchenko	(substituted off) 46'
MF	(Ukrainian Soviet Socialist Republic) Ihor Yakubovsky
FW	(Ukrainian Soviet Socialist Republic) Yuri Tarasov	(yellow card) ?'
FW	(Georgian Soviet Socialist Republic) Guram Adzhoyev
Substitutes:
FW	(Ukrainian Soviet Socialist Republic) Viktor Yalovsky	(substituted in) 51'
DF	(Georgian Soviet Socialist Republic) Roman Khagba	(substituted in) 79'
MF	(Ukrainian Soviet Socialist Republic) Oleksandr Baranov	(substituted in) 46'
GK
DF
DF
MF
Manager:
(Ukrainian Soviet Socialist Republic) Yevhen Lemeshko

MATCH OFFICIALS

- Assistant referees:
  - V.Zhuk (Minsk)
  - A.Khokhryakov (Yoshkar-Ola)
- Fourth official: ( )

MATCH RULES

- 90 minutes.
- 30 minutes of extra-time if necessary.
- Penalty shoot-out if scores still level.
- Seven named substitutes
- Maximum of 3 substitutions.

Soviet Cup 1988 Winners
Metalist Kharkiv
First title

== See also ==
- Soviet Top League 1987
