= Oleksandr Dovbiy =

Ukrainian football player and manager (1953–2023)

Personal information
- Full name: Oleksandr Petrovych Dovbiy
- Date of birth: 28 September 1953
- Place of birth: Kharkiv, Ukrainian SSR, USSR
- Date of death: 11 March 2023 (aged 69)
- Place of death: Kharkiv, Ukraine
- Position: Forward

Senior career*
Years	Team	Apps	(Gls)
1972	Lokomotyv Kherson		
1974–1975	Frunzenets Sumy		
1975–1976	Metalist Kharkiv		
1976–1977	SKA Kyiv		
1978	Chornomorets Odesa		
1979–1981	Metalist Kharkiv		
1982–1983	Frunzenets Sumy		

Managerial career
- 1990—1991: Metalist Kharkiv (assistant)
- 1994: Metalist Kharkiv
- 1994—1995: Khimik Zhytomyr (assistant)
- 1996—1997: Naftovyk-Ukrnafta Okhtyrka
- 1997—1998: Zirka Kirovohrad
- 1998: Vorskla Poltava
- 1999—2000: Metalist Kharkiv (assistant)
- 2001: FC Sumy
- 2002: Anzhi Makhachkala (assistant)
- 2003: Sokol Saratov (assistant)
- 2003–2004: Zorya Luhansk
- 2005–2006: Kharkiv-2
- 2006–2007: Hazovyk-KhGV Kharkiv
- 2009: Zaria Bălți
- 2009–2011: PVF Ho Chi Minh City
- 2011–2012: Zaria Bălți (sporting director)
- * Club domestic league appearances and goals

Oleksandr Petrovych Dovbiy (Ukrainian: Олександр Петрович Довбій; 28 September 1953 – 11 March 2023) was a Soviet and Ukrainian football forward and manager, master of sports of the USSR (1980).

== Playing career ==
The Lokomotiv was the first professional team Dovbiy played for. In 1974–75 he played for the FC Frunzenets team based in Sumy. Then he returned to Kharkiv.

In 1976 Dovbiy was called up for the military service where he played for the army football club in B league FC CSKA Kyiv (based in Kyiv). In 1977, he scored 18 goals and became one of top scorers in the season. His teammate Mykola Pinchuck scored 20 goals in that season.

After military service, Dovbiy spent a season with Chornomorets Odesa. Then he moved to Metalist Kharkiv in 1979 and spent three seasons there. In 1981, he became the winner of the A league and paved the way to the premier league. Dovbiy finished his career in FC Frunzenets.

== Managerial career ==
After completion of his playing career, Dovbiy worked as a faculty instructor at the Kharkiv branch of the Kyiv State University of Physical Culture and Kharkiv State College of Physical Culture No.1.

From 1990 to 1991 Dovbiy worked as a coach in Metalist Kharkiv. Later, he held the position of a football manager in FC Khimik Zhytomyr. In 1993–94 season, Dovbiy was also a head coach in FC Naftovyk from Okhtyrka. Later he was the head coach in FC Zirka Kirovohrad and Vorskla. In 1999, he moved to Kharkiv where he assisted Mykhaylo Fomenko in coaching Metalist Kharkiv.

In 2002, Dovbiy accepted the invitation from Leonid Tkachenko, who was the caretaker manager of the premier league Anzhi Makhachkala, to join the coaching team.

In 2003, Dovbiy held in the Sokol Saratov, and then returned to Ukraine where he was a coach of Zorya Luhans. He helped the club to stay in the A league. In 2005, Dovbiy returned to Kharkiv, where he was a football manager in FC Kharkiv-2 and FC Hazovyk-KhGV Kharkiv that played in the B league. In 2009, he worked at Moldovan club Zaria Bălți, but in June left the coaching position.

From 2009 to 2011 Dovbiy worked in Vietnam, where he was the head coach and one of the founders of the national football academy PVF.

From October 2011, Dovbiy held the position of sporting director of FC Olympia (Balti).

== Death ==
Dovbiy died in Kharkiv on 11 March 2023, at the age of 69.
