= Vashchenko =

Vashchenko (Ukrainian: Ващенко), also transliterated Vaschenko, is a Ukrainian-language surname. Notable people with the surname include:

- Daniil Vashchenko (born 2005), Ukrainian footballer
- Mikhail Vaschenko-Zakharchenko (1825–1912), Ukrainian mathematician
- Roman Vashchenko (born 2000), Ukrainian gymnast
- Viktor Vashchenko (born 1965), Russian footballer
- Yulia Vashchenko (born 1978), Ukrainian footballer
