= 1973 Cup of the Ukrainian SSR =

- Dates: 1 - 18 November 1973

Final positions
- Champions: Zirka Kirovohrad
- Runners-up: Spartak Ivano-Frankivsk

The Ukrainian Cup 1973 was a football knockout competition conducted by the Football Federation of Ukrainian SSR and was known as the Ukrainian Cup.

The competitions began with the preliminary round on November 1, 1973, and involved republican-level non-amateur clubs. The main event started with the round of 16 on November 6, 1973, when the inter-republican clubs joined the competition, such as Chornomorets, Metalist, and others, while some of them were represented by their second squad. Dynamo Kyiv has chosen not to participate in it since its last winning season in 1948. Also, the last season champions FC Avtomobilist Zhytomyr, which entered the competition at the Round of 16, were eliminated in the quarterfinals. Unlike the previous edition, the tournament introduced a penalty shootout, which replaced the method of a game replay. The competition concluded in two and a half weeks in Kyiv on November 18. Note that the tournament took place after the Soviet football season was over and was conducted in rather unsupported weather conditions, as the cold period in Ukraine usually occurs in September or October, depending on location.

== Teams ==
=== Tournament distribution ===
The competition was conducted among all 23 Ukrainian clubs of the 1973 Soviet Second League, Zone 1 and all 4 Ukrainian clubs of the 1973 Soviet First League.

First round (22 teams)	22 entrants from the Second League (Zone 1)	
Second round (16 teams)	4 entrants from the First League; 1 entrants from the Second League (Zone 1); (Avtomobilist Zhytomyr)	11 winners from the First round

=== Other professional teams ===
The five Ukrainian professional teams in the Soviet Top League did not take part in the competition.

- 1973 Soviet Top League (5): FC Dnipro Dnipropetrovsk, FC Dynamo Kyiv, FC Karpaty Lviv, FC Shakhtar Donetsk, FC Zorya Voroshylovhrad

== Competition schedule ==
=== Preliminary round ===
November 1, 1973

Team 1	Score	Team 2
Hoverla Uzhhorod	0–0 (5–3 p)	Kolos Poltava
Kryvbas Kryvyi Rih	2–0	Avanhard Sevastopol
Budivelnyk Ternopil	1–2	Lokomotyv Vinnytsia
Dynamo Khmelnytskyi	7–2	SC Chernihiv
SC Lutsk	3–0	Bukovyna Chernivtsi
Avanhard Rivne	1–0	Frunzenets Sumy
Tavriya Simferopol	w/o	Shakhtar Kadiivka
Lokomotyv Kherson	2–1	Sudnobudivelnyk Mykolaiv
Metalurh Zhdanov	0–2	Shakhtar Horlivka
Zirka Kirovohrad	3–1	Khimik Severodonetsk
Shakhtar Makiivka	2–1	Lokomotyv Donetsk

=== First elimination round ===
November 6, 1973

Team 1	Score	Team 2
Hoverla Uzhhorod	0–0 (2–3 p)	Chornomorets Odessa
SC Lutsk	1–2	Metalist Kharkiv
Lokomotyv Vinnytsia	4–0	Kryvbas Kryvyi Rih
Dynamo Khmelnytskyi	0–1	Spartak Ivano-Frankivsk
Shakhtar Kadiivka	1–3	Avanhard Rivne
Shakhtar Horlivka	2–2 (4–5 p)	Lokomotyv Kherson
Zirka Kirovohrad	2–0	Metalurh Zaporizhia
Avtomobilist Zhytomyr	w/o	Shakhtar Makiivka

=== Quarterfinals ===
November 10, 1973

Team 1	Score	Team 2
Avtomobilist Zhytomyr	1–2 (a.e.t.)	Zirka Kirovohrad
Chornomorets Odessa	1–4	Lokomotyv Vinnytsia
Metalist Kharkiv	1–0	Lokomotyv Kherson
Spartak Ivano-Frankivsk	1–0	Avanhard Rivne

=== Semifinals ===
November 14, 1973

Team 1	Score	Team 2
Lokomotyv Vinnytsia	0–1	Spartak Ivano-Frankivsk
Zirka Kirovohrad	4–0	Metalist Kharkiv

=== Final ===
Team 1	Score	Team 2
Zirka Kirovohrad	1–0	Spartak Ivano-Frankivsk

The final was held on November 18, 1973, in Kiev. Remarkable is the fact that the final involved participation of such players as Taras Shuliatytsky, Oleksandr Ischenko, and others well known players of that time.

18 November 1973

Zirka Kirovohrad	1–0	Spartak Ivano-Frankivsk
Deineha

Kiev
Referee: Kostyantyn Vykhrov (Kiev)

== Top goalscorers ==
Scorer	Goals	Team
(Ukrainian Soviet Socialist Republic)	?	

Ukrainian Cup 1973 Winners

FC Zirka Kirovohrad
Second title

== See also ==
- Soviet Cup
- Ukrainian Cup
