= Viktor Kamarzayev =

Soviet footballer and Ukrainian coach

Personal information
- Date of birth: 21 September 1956 (age 70)
- Place of birth: Prokhladny, Russian SFSR
- Height: 1.84 m (6 ft 0 in)
- Position: Defender

Senior career*
| Years | Team | Apps | (Gls) |
| 1978–1980 | Spartak Nalchik | 118 | (11) |
| 1981–1986 | Metalist Kharkiv | 181 | (10) |
| 1987 | Druzhba Maykop | 30 | (3) |
| 1988 | Mayak Kharkiv | 25 | (1) |
| 1988 | Metalurh Zaporizhzhia | 20 | (0) |
| 1989 | Torpedo Zaporizhzhia | 49 | (2) |
| 1990 | Vorskla Poltava | 16 | (0) |
| 1993 | Avanhard Merefa | 5 | (0) |

Managerial career
- 1991–1994: Metalist Kharkiv (youth coach)
- 1994–1995: Metalist Kharkiv
- 2000–2003: Metalist-2 Kharkiv
- 2004–2005: Metalist-2 Kharkiv
- 2005: Metalist Kharkiv (coach)
- 2005–2007: Arsenal Kharkiv
- 2007: Hazovyk-KhGV Kharkiv
- 2011: Kaisar
- * Club domestic league appearances and goals

Viktor Kamarzayev (Russian: Виктор Владимирович Камарзаев) is a Soviet midfielder from Russia and Ukrainian coach.

He has a younger brother, Anatoliy Kamarzayev, who in the 1990s played football in lower Russian leagues.
