= 1977 in Soviet football =

Football in the Soviet Union
- Season: 1977

Men's football
- Top League: Dinamo Kiev
- First League: Spartak Moscow
- Second League: Zhalgiris Vilnius (Group 1); SKA Odessa (Group 2); Kuban Krasnodar (Group 3); Spartak Nalchik (Group 4); Yangiyer (Group 5); Spartak Semipalatinsk (Group 6)
- Soviet Cup: Dinamo Moscow

The 1977 Soviet football championship was the 46th seasons of competitive football in the Soviet Union, the 40th among teams of masters. Dinamo Kiev won the Top League championship becoming the Soviet domestic champions for the eighth time.

== Honours ==
| Competition | | Winner | Runner-up |
|---|---|---|---|
| Top League | | Dinamo Kiev (8) | Dinamo Tbilisi |
| First League | | Spartak Moscow (1) | Pakhtakor Tashkent |
| Second League | Group 1 | Zhalgiris Vilnius | Iskra Smolensk |
| Second League | Group 2 | SKA Odessa | SKA Kiev |
| Second League | Group 3 | Kuban Krasnodar | Fakel Voronezh |
| Second League | Group 4 | Spartak Nalchik | Dinamo Makhachkala |
| Second League | Group 5 | Yangiyer | Alga Frunze |
| Second League | Group 6 | Spartak Semipalatinsk | SKA Khabarovsk |
| Soviet Cup | | Dinamo Moscow (5) | Torpedo Moscow |

Notes = Number in parentheses is the times that club has won that honour. * indicates new record for competition

== Soviet Union football championship ==
=== Top League ===
| Pos | Team | Pld | W | D | L | GF | GA | GD | Pts | Qualification or relegation |
|---|---|---|---|---|---|---|---|---|---|---|
| 1 | (Ukrainian Soviet Socialist Republic) Dynamo Kyiv (C) | 30 | 14 | 15 | 1 | 51 | 12 | +39 | 43 | Qualification for European Cup first round |
| 2 | (Georgian Soviet Socialist Republic) Dinamo Tbilisi | 30 | 13 | 13 | 4 | 43 | 26 | +17 | 39 | Qualification for UEFA Cup first round |
| 3 | (Russian Soviet Federative Socialist Republic) Torpedo Moscow | 30 | 12 | 13 | 5 | 30 | 23 | +7 | 37 | Qualification for UEFA Cup first round |
| 4 | (Russian Soviet Federative Socialist Republic) Dynamo Moscow | 30 | 9 | 17 | 4 | 34 | 20 | +14 | 35 | |
| 5 | (Ukrainian Soviet Socialist Republic) Shakhtar Donetsk | 30 | 9 | 16 | 5 | 31 | 24 | +7 | 34 | Qualification for Cup Winners' Cup first round |
| 6 | (Russian Soviet Federative Socialist Republic) Lokomotiv Moscow | 30 | 9 | 14 | 7 | 27 | 25 | +2 | 32 | |
| 7 | (Ukrainian Soviet Socialist Republic) Chornomorets Odessa | 30 | 11 | 8 | 11 | 33 | 41 | −8 | 30 | |
| 8 | (Kazakh Soviet Socialist Republic) Kairat Alma-Ata | 30 | 6 | 17 | 7 | 26 | 31 | −5 | 29 | |
| 9 | (Ukrainian Soviet Socialist Republic) Zaria Voroshilovgrad | 30 | 8 | 12 | 10 | 28 | 24 | +4 | 28 | |
| 10 | (Russian Soviet Federative Socialist Republic) Zenit Leningrad | 30 | 8 | 12 | 10 | 34 | 33 | +1 | 28 | |
| 11 | (Armenian Soviet Socialist Republic) Ararat Yerevan | 30 | 7 | 13 | 10 | 28 | 34 | −6 | 27 | |
| 12 | (Ukrainian Soviet Socialist Republic) Dnipro Dnipropetrovsk | 30 | 9 | 9 | 12 | 24 | 31 | −7 | 27 | |
| 13 | (Azerbaijan Soviet Socialist Republic) Neftchi Baku | 30 | 5 | 17 | 8 | 25 | 34 | −9 | 27 | |
| 14 | (Russian Soviet Federative Socialist Republic) CSKA Moscow | 30 | 5 | 17 | 8 | 28 | 39 | −11 | 27 | |
| 15 | (Ukrainian Soviet Socialist Republic) Karpaty Lviv (R) | 30 | 6 | 14 | 10 | 26 | 30 | −4 | 26 | Relegation to First League |
| 16 | (Russian Soviet Federative Socialist Republic) Krylya Sovetov Kuibyshev (R) | 30 | 2 | 7 | 21 | 18 | 59 | −41 | 11 | Relegation to First League |

(C) Champions; (R) Relegated

=== First League ===
| Pos | Rep | Team | Pld | W | D | L | GF | GA | GD | Pts | Promotion or relegation |
|---|---|---|---|---|---|---|---|---|---|---|---|
| 1 | RUS | Spartak Moskva | 38 | 22 | 10 | 6 | 83 | 42 | +41 | 54 | Promoted |
| 2 | UZB | Pahtakor Tashkent | 38 | 19 | 14 | 5 | 57 | 28 | +29 | 52 | Promoted |
| 3 | UKR | Tavria Simferopol | 38 | 21 | 7 | 10 | 57 | 34 | +23 | 49 | |
| 4 | BLR | Dinamo Minsk | 38 | 19 | 9 | 10 | 48 | 29 | +19 | 47 | |
| 5 | TJK | Pamir Dushanbe | 38 | 19 | 7 | 12 | 54 | 36 | +18 | 45 | |
| 6 | RUS | Kuzbass Kemerovo | 38 | 20 | 5 | 13 | 51 | 38 | +13 | 45 | |
| 7 | RUS | Terek Grozny | 38 | 17 | 7 | 14 | 59 | 48 | +11 | 41 | |
| 8 | RUS | Shinnik Yaroslavl | 38 | 14 | 13 | 11 | 50 | 44 | +6 | 41 | |
| 9 | GEO | Torpedo Kutaisi | 38 | 15 | 8 | 15 | 45 | 48 | −3 | 38 | |
| 10 | RUS | SKA Rostov-na-Donu | 38 | 12 | 12 | 14 | 43 | 48 | −5 | 36 | |
| 11 | MDA | Nistru Kishinev | 38 | 11 | 14 | 13 | 45 | 51 | −6 | 36 | |
| 12 | RUS | UralMash Sverdlovsk | 38 | 13 | 10 | 15 | 52 | 62 | −10 | 36 | |
| 13 | RUS | Dinamo Leningrad | 38 | 11 | 12 | 15 | 51 | 54 | −3 | 34 | |
| 14 | UKR | Spartak Ivano-Frankovsk | 38 | 10 | 14 | 14 | 38 | 52 | −14 | 34 | |
| 15 | RUS | Spartak Orjonikidze | 38 | 11 | 11 | 16 | 38 | 45 | −7 | 33 | |
| 16 | UKR | Metallurg Zaporozhye | 38 | 11 | 11 | 16 | 35 | 48 | −13 | 33 | |
| 17 | TKM | Kolhozchi Ashkhabad | 38 | 12 | 8 | 18 | 43 | 60 | −17 | 32 | |
| 18 | UKR | Krivbass Krivoi Rog | 38 | 10 | 8 | 20 | 43 | 59 | −16 | 28 | Relegated |
| 19 | RUS | Zvezda Perm | 38 | 7 | 10 | 21 | 32 | 62 | −30 | 24 | Relegated |
| 20 | RUS | Rubin Kazan | 38 | 6 | 10 | 22 | 40 | 76 | −36 | 22 | Relegated |

Source: rsssf.com

=== Second League (playoffs) ===
[Oct 31, Nov 5]
Spartak Semipalatinsk  2-2 0-3  SKA Odessa 
Kuban Krasnodar        2-0 1-2  Yangiyer 
Spartak Nalchik        1-0 0-1  Žalgiris Vilnius

Replay

[Nov 8]
KUBAN Krasnodar        2-0  Yangiyer         [in Simferopol] 
Žalgiris Vilnius       2-1  Spartak Nalchik  [in Kishinev]

=== Top goalscorers ===
Top League

- Oleh Blokhin (Dinamo Kiev) – 17 goals

First League

- Ihor Nadeyin (Nistru Kishinev), Vitaliy Razdayev (Kuzbass Kemerovo), Anatoliy Zinchenko (Dinamo Leningrad) – 19 goals
