= Oleksandr Yaroslavskyi =

Ukrainian businessman (born 1959)

- Олександр Ярославський
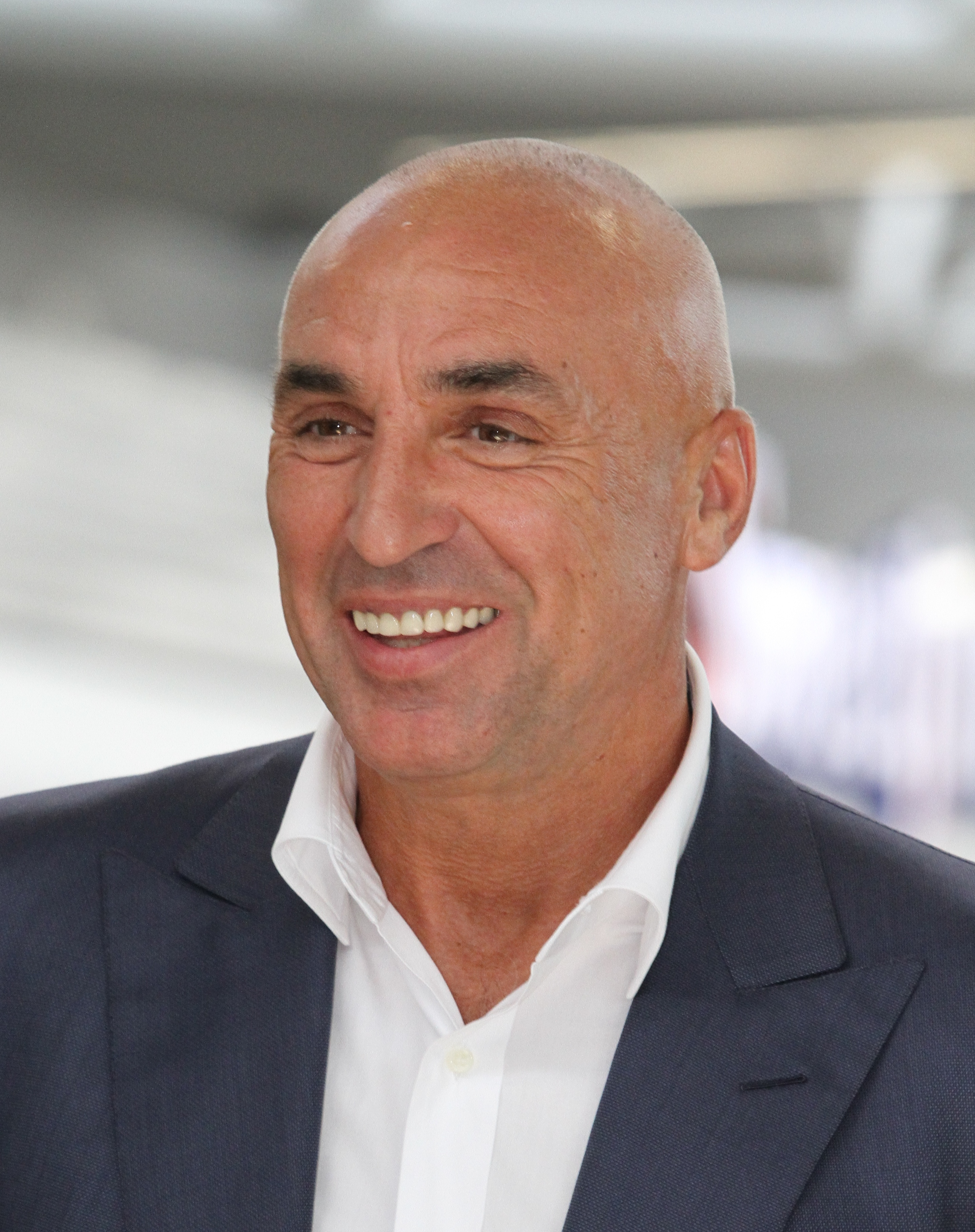
- Yaroslavskyi in 2010
- Born: 5 December 1959 (age 66); Zhdanov, Ukrainian SSR, Soviet Union
- Occupation: Businessman
- Children: 5

Oleksandr Vladylenovych Yaroslavskyi (Ukrainian: Олександр Владиленович Ярославський; born 5 December 1959) is a Ukrainian businessman. He was formerly co-owner of UkrSibbank and president of FC Metalist Kharkiv (2005–2012). Yaroslavskyi is the president of DCH (Development Construction Holding) and one of the most influential people in Ukraine according to Ukrainian and Eastern European media. In 2016, Forbes ranked him among the top ten richest people in Ukraine. In November 2018, Russia imposed sanctions against 322 citizens of Ukraine, including Yaroslavskyi.

== Early life ==
Oleksandr Yaroslavskyi was born in Zhdanov (now Mariupol) in the south of the Ukrainian SSR. Both of his parents were doctors. A few years later, his parents moved to Kharkiv. Yaroslavskyi graduated as a technologist from the Kharkiv Academy of Public Nutrition and then spent 3 years doing military service in the Soviet Army in Hungary. Upon being demobilized, he took jurisprudence courses provided by the Ministry of Internal Affairs and spent a year working as an inspector in the Kharkiv Department Against Misappropriation of Socialist Property (so called OBKhSS). In 1989, he graduated from the Odesa Institute of Technology as a Candidate of Technical Sciences and worked at the Kharkiv Institute of Food Technology. The collapse of the Soviet Union marked a new reference point in his career.

== Career ==
In 2002–2006, Oleksandr Yaroslavskyi was a People's Deputy in the Verkhovna Rada of Ukraine of IV convocation as a member of the Party of Greens of Ukraine.

From 2012 to 2020, he was in conflict with Hennadii Kernes, the mayor of Kharkiv.

== In exile ==
Yaroslavskyi's motorcade fatally ran over a pedestrian near Chuguiv in the beginning February 2022. Immediately following the incident, Yaroslavskyi flew to London on his own plane, promising to return as soon as business was resolved. He then claimed to have a long-planned vacation with his family.

Yaroslavskyi said he planned to sell his $50 million Kaiser yacht to rebuild Kharkiv, after the outbreak of war. However, a few months later, he withdrew the yacht from sale. Photos from the yacht were posted by Yaroslavskyi's wife Marina. According to the head of the Kharkiv regional military administration, Oleh Sinegubov, Yaroslavskyi said in the first week of the Russian invasion that he was unable to assist the Ukrainian Defense Forces. Yaroslavskyi himself, who promised to sell his yacht for the sake of rebuilding the city but has yet to do so, has been spotted several times vacationing in France.

In April 2023, Yaroslavskyi's wife Marina seemingly left him.
