= Leonid Tkachenko =

Leonid Tkachenko may refer to:

- Leonid Tkachenko (footballer) (born 1953), former Soviet footballer and football manager
- Leonid Tkachenko (artist) (born 1927), Soviet and Russian painter
