= Ivan Baranov =

Ukrainian footballer (born 1985)

Personal information
- Full name: Ivan Oleksandrovych Baranov
- Date of birth: 16 June 1985 (age 41)
- Place of birth: Makiivka, Donetsk Oblast, Soviet Union
- Height: 1.95 m (6 ft 5 in)
- Position: Defender

Senior career*
Years	Team	Apps	(Gls)
2001–2004	Viikingit Helsinki		
2003	→ TP-47 Tornio (loan)		
2005–2007	Arsenal Kyiv	5	(0)
2007	Gnistan Helsinki	22	(0)
2007–2010	Spartak Helsinki		
- * Club domestic league appearances and goals

Ivan Baranov (born 16 June 1985) is a Ukrainian footballer. He is right and central defender. Baranov started his career at Ukrainian Premier League club Arsenal Kyiv.

He is a son of former player and coach Oleksandr Baranov.
