= Global ATM Alliance =

Joint venture of international banks

The Global ATM Alliance is a joint venture of several major international banks that allows customers of their banks to use their automated teller machine (ATM) card or debit card at another bank within the alliance with no international ATM access fees. Other fees, such as an international transaction or foreign currency fee, may still apply for some account holders. Participating banks are located around the globe.

The participating banks are as follows. Some of the listed banks, however, may honor ATM reciprocity only in one country for certain allied banks, e.g., fees may not be charged for Barclays branches in the United Kingdom, but fees may be charged for branches of Barclays in other countries.

- Bank of America (United States)
- Barclays (United Kingdom)
- BNP Paribas and its affiliate banks (France, Italy, Ukraine, Turkey, Poland, Morocco, New Caledonia, Réunion, Guyane, Guadeloupe, Martinique, and Luxembourg)
  - Banca Nazionale del Lavoro (Italy)
  - Türk Ekonomi Bankası (Turkey)
  - Ukrsibbank (Ukraine)
- Deutsche Bank (Germany, Belgium, India, Spain, and Portugal)
- Scotiabank (Canada, Mexico, Chile, Peru, Guyana, and the Caribbean)
- Westpac and its affiliate banks(Australia, New Zealand, Fiji, and Papua New Guinea)
  - Westpac Banking Corporation (Australia)
  - Westpac New Zealand Limited (New Zealand)
  - Westpac Pacific Banking (Fiji, Papua New Guinea)

== Bank-specific rules and information ==
=== Bank of America account holders ===
There are three separate fees that may apply to Bank of America account holders when using their ATM or debit cards outside the United States:

- The 3 percent "international transaction fee" for converting currencies. This fee is not waived under the Global ATM Alliance.
- The "non-Bank of America usage fee" for each withdrawal, transfer, or balance inquiry at non-Bank of America ATMs outside the United States. This fee is waived under the Global ATM Alliance within the following coverage areas.
- The "ATM operator access fee". This fee is waived under the Global ATM Alliance within the following coverage areas.

Coverage Area	Global ATM Alliance Bank
United Kingdom: England, Northern Ireland, Scotland, Wales, Jersey, Guernsey, and the Channel Islands.	Barclays
France	BNP Paribas
Italy	BNL d'Italia
Luxembourg	BGL BNP Paribas
Germany, Spain	Deutsche Bank
Canada, Mexico, Chile, Peru, and the Caribbean, including Anguilla, Antigua & Barbuda, the Bahamas, Barbados, the British Virgin Islands, the Cayman Islands, Dominica, the Dominican Republic, Grenada, Jamaica, Saint Maarten, Saint Kitts and Nevis, Saint Lucia, Saint Vincent and the Grenadines, Trinidad and Tobago, and the Turks and Caicos Islands.	Scotiabank
Australia and New Zealand	Westpac
Ukraine	Ukrsibbank
Turkey	TEB
South Africa	None specified (as of February 2022)

Additionally, Bank of America also has a special partnership with China Construction Bank to provide the same ATM fee waivers to Bank of America account holders using China Construction Bank ATMs in mainland China (excluding Hong Kong). I.e., account holders using their Bank of America ATM card or debit card at a China Construction Bank ATM in mainland China can avoid the "non-Bank of America usage fee" and "ATM operator access fee" for each withdrawal, transfer, or balance inquiry. The 3 percent "international transaction fee" for converting currencies will still apply.

=== Westpac Bank Australian account holders ===
==== Westpac cash withdrawal fee ====
A holder of a Westpac Australia "everyday bank account" or "savings account" may incur a A$5 fee when making a successful cash withdrawal at an ATM outside Australia. This fee does not apply to two types of savings accounts: "eSaver" and "Bump Savings". The fee is waived when using a Mastercard/Cirrus ATM of a participant in the Global ATM Alliance in the following countries:

Country/Territory	MasterCard/Cirrus ATM network
New Zealand	Westpac NZ
Fiji, Papua New Guinea	Westpac Pacific Banking
France, Poland, Italy (under the BNL Brand)	BNP Paribas
Ukraine	Ukrsibbank
Germany, Spain	Deutsche Bank
UK and Gibraltar	Barclays Bank
USA	Bank of America
China	Bank of Nanjing
Singapore	POSB
Hong Kong, Singapore, Taiwan	DBS
Indonesia, Malaysia	CIMB
Canada, Chile, Guyana, Mexico, Peru Caribbean - Antigua & Barbuda, Bahamas, Barbados, Cayman Islands, Jamaica, Trinidad & Tobago, Turks & Caicos and the US Virgin Islands.	Scotiabank

==== Westpac Australia foreign transaction fee ====
A holder of a Westpac Australia "everyday bank account" or "savings account" may incur a foreign transaction fee equal to 3 percent of the Australian dollars transaction amount when making a debit or credit card withdrawal at an ATM outside Australia. This fee is composed of the 2 percent Westpac processing fee and the 1 percent Westpac on-charged scheme fee. This fee is not waived when using an ATM of the Global ATM Alliance.

=== Westpac New Zealand account holders ===
For Westpac's New Zealand account holders, using a Global ATM Alliance ATM means Westpac will waive its NZ$3 international transaction fee that would be charged at other overseas ATMs. All other fees apply, including a 1.95% foreign currency conversion fee.

The list of countries covered by the Global ATM Alliance fee waiver differs for Westpac NZ clients from that for Westpac Australia clients. Singapore, Hong Kong, Malaysia, Indonesia, Taiwan and China are not listed as included in the scheme on the Westpac NZ website.

=== Barclays account holders ===
A customer can withdraw cash from a Barclays account from a cash machine in the Global Alliance without transaction charges. If the customer uses a cash machine that isn't in the Global Alliance or use a Barclaycard, additional charges apply.
For Barclays account holders:

Coverage Area	Bank Name
Australia	Westpac Bank
Canada	Scotiabank
France	BNP Paribas
Germany	Deutsche Bank
Guatemala	Scotiabank
Mexico	Scotiabank
New Zealand	Westpac Bank
Pacific Islands	Westpac Bank
Turkey	TEB
Ukraine	Ukrsibbank
United States	Bank of America
Great Britain, Worldwide	Barclays

=== BNP Paribas account holders ===
Consorsbank (Germany) customers are eligible for free cash withdrawals from ATMs operated by:

- Bank of America (USA)
- BNP Paribas (France, Poland)
- BGL BNP Paribas (Luxembourg)
- BNL Banca Nazionale Del Lavoro (Italy)
- Barclays United Kingdom (England, Scotland, Wales, Northern Ireland, Channel Islands)
- Deutsche Bank (including in Portugal)
- Scotiabank (Canada and the Caribbean)
- Westpac Bank (Australia, New Zealand, Fiji, Cook Islands, Papua New-Guinea, Samoa, Tonga, Vanuatu, Solomon Islands)
- Ukrsibbank (Ukraine)

=== Deutsche Bank account holders ===
For Deutsche Bank account holders:

Coverage Area	Bank Name
Germany and worldwide	Deutsche Bank
United States	Bank of America
Great Britain, Ghana, Kenya, Mauritius, Tanzania, Zimbabwe	Barclays
Luxembourg	BGL BNP Paribas
France	BNP Paribas
Canada, Chile	Scotiabank
Australia, New Zealand	Westpac Bank

=== Scotiabank account holders ===
Scotiabank customers can find a partner ATM, avoid surcharges and save on access fees. The Scotiabank website includes a list of countries and partner institutions where the fee will be waived. Also, the Scotiabank Mobile Banking app has an ATM locator to help customers find the nearest partner ATM, only for national ATMs.

=== Tangerine account holders ===
Tangerine will waive the international ABM access fee and Global ATM Alliance members will waive any terminal convenience or usage fees for any withdrawal transactions performed at Global ATM Alliance machines with a Tangerine client card. "Free access" does not apply to Scotiabank ABMs in Costa Rica, Haiti, Panama or Uruguay.
