= Viktor Yalovskyi =

Ukrainian–Soviet footballer (1965–2012)

Viktor Yalovsky
Personal information
- Full name: Viktor Mykhailovych Yalovsky
- Date of birth: 1 August 1965
- Place of birth: Ukrainian SSR
- Date of death: 8 August 2012 (aged 47)
- Place of death: Kharkiv, Ukraine
- Height: 1.78 m (5 ft 10 in)
- Position: Defender

Youth career
- Metalist Kharkiv

Senior career*
Years	Team	Apps	(Gls)
1983–1984	Metalist Kharkiv	6	(0)
1985–1986	SKA Kiev	68	(2)
1987–1992	Metalist Kharkiv	74	(1)
1992	Kremin Kremenchuk	5	(0)
1993	Torpedo Zaporizhia	13	(1)
1993–1994	Temp Shepetivka	27	(0)
1994	→ Podillya Khmelnytskyi (loan)	14	(1)
1995	Skala Stryi	15	(0)
1996	Kryvbas Kryvyi Rih	8	(0)
1997	Krystal Parkhomivka	5	(0)
1998	Zirka Kirovohrad	9	(0)
Total		239	(5)
- * Club domestic league appearances and goals

Viktor Yalovsky (Ukrainian: Віктор Михайлович Яловський; 1 August 1965 – 8 August 2012) was a Ukrainian–Soviet professional football player.

== Career ==
After winning the Soviet Cup with FC Metalist Kharkiv, Yalovsky played a game at the 1988–89 UEFA Cup Winners' Cup (FK Borac Banja Luka).

== Honours ==
- Soviet Cup winner: 1987–88.
