= Ivan Panchyshyn =

Ukrainian footballer (born 1961)

Personal information
- Full name: Ivan Mykolayovych Panchyshyn
- Date of birth: 15 June 1961 (age 65)
- Place of birth: Kolodruby, Lviv Oblast, Ukrainian SSR
- Height: 1.78 m (5 ft 10 in)
- Position: Defender

Youth career
- SDYuShOR Karpaty Lviv

Senior career*
Years	Team	Apps	(Gls)
1983	Silmash Kovel		
1984	Nyva Vinnytsia	34	(4)
1985–1994	Metalist Kharkiv	252	(7)
1994–1995	Polihraftekhnika Oleksandriya	40	(2)
1995–1996	Karpaty Lviv	34	(1)
1996–1997	Metalist Kharkiv	57	(0)
1997	→ Metalist-2 Kharkiv	1	(0)
Total		418	(14)

Managerial career
- 1998–2000: Metalist-2 Kharkiv
- 2001–2002: Arsenal Kharkiv
- 2003–2005: Hazovyk-KhGD Kharkiv
- 2007–2008: Nyva-Svitanok Vinnytsia
- * Club domestic league appearances and goals

Ivan Mykolayovych Panchyshyn (Ukrainian: Іван Миколайович Панчишин; born 15 June 1961) is a Ukrainian former football player and manager. A defender, he spent most of his career with Metalist Kharkiv.

== Honours ==
Metalist Kharkiv

- Soviet Cup: 1987–88
