= 1987–88 Soviet Cup =

1987–88 Cup of USSR in Football
Кубок СССР

Tournament details
- Country: Soviet Union
- Dates: June 6, 1987 – May 28, 1988
- Teams: 80

Final positions
- Champions: Metalist Kharkiv
- Runners-up: Torpedo Moscow

The 1987–88 Soviet Cup was a 46th cup competition of the Soviet Union. The winner of the competition, Metallist Kharkov, qualified for the continental tournament.

== Competition overview ==
In the competitions were taken place 80 teams of masters, including 16 teams of the Top League, 22 of the First and 42 of the Second league, the best representatives of nine zones in the following numbers: from 1, 3, 5, 7, 8 and 9 zones - 4 teams each, from 2 and 4 zones 3 teams each, from 6 zones - 6 teams, the winner of the RSFSR Cup "Textilshchik" (Ivanovo) and 5 teams eliminated from the First league.

The teams of the First and Second leagues will begin the games of the 1/64 finals on June 6 according to the system with elimination after the first defeat. If the match ends in a draw, then extra time is assigned - two halves of 15 minutes each. If extra time does not reveal the winner, then in accordance with FIFA Regulations it will be determined using penalty kicks. During matches for the Soviet Cup, no more than three players are allowed as substitution.

The home team in the matches of the 1/64 finals received odd numbers, and when determining the venues for the matches of the 1/32 finals (June 25), the teams that had away matches in the previous tournament are given priority.

In the 1/16 and 1/8 finals, teams meet twice at each stage. In the first games of the 1/16 finals, the home teams are the teams of the major league, and in the return matches their opponents will play on their home fields. For the first games of the 1/8 finals, the home team is determined by lot.

The winners of the 1/16 and 1/8 final pairs are determined based on the results of two games in accordance with the UEFA rules approved for European club team cup tournaments. The quarter-finals, semi-finals and finals will take place next year.

== Participating teams ==
Enter in Round of 32	Enter in First Preliminary Round			
1987 Vysshaya Liga; 16/16 teams	1987 Pervaya Liga; 22/22 teams	1987 Vtoraya Liga; 42/161 teams		
✓ Spartak Moscow; ✓ Dnipro Dnipropetrovsk; ✓ Zalgiris Vilnius; ✓ Torpedo Moscow; ✓ Dinamo Minsk; ✓ Dynamo Kyiv; ✓ Shakhtar Donetsk; ✓ Ararat Erevan; ✓ Neftchi Baku; ✓ Dinamo Moscow; ✓ Metalist Kharkiv; ✓ Kairat Alma-Ata; ✓ Iberia Tbilisi; ✓ Zenit Leningrad; ✓ CSKA Moscow (v); ✓ Guria Lanchkhuti (v)	✓ Chornomorets Odesa (^); ✓ Lokomotiv Moscow (^); ✓ Daugava Riga; ✓ Pamir Dushambe; ✓ SKA Karpaty Lviv; ✓ Kuzbass Kemerovo; ✓ Pakhtakor Tashkent; ✓ Kolos Nikopol; ✓ Metalurh Zaporizhzhia; ✓ Rostselmash Rostov-na-Donu; ✓ SKA Rostov-na-Donu; ✓ Geolog Tyumen; ✓ Kotaik Abovian; ✓ Shinnik Yaroslavl; ✓ Dinamo Stavropol; ✓ Zorya Luhansk; ✓ Rotor Volgograd; ✓ Spartak Ordzhonikidze; ✓ Dinamo Batumi; ✓ Fakel Voronezh (v); ✓ Torpedo Kutaisi (v); ✓ Krylya Sovietov Kuibyshev (v)	✓ Iskra Smolensk; ✓ Tekstilschik Ivanovo; ✓ Zaria Kaluga; ✓ Krasnaya Presnya Moscow; ✓ Znamia Truda Orekhovo-Zuyevo; ✓ Arsenal Tula	✓ Zvezda Perm; ✓ Uralmash Sverdlovsk; ✓ Zenit Izhevsk	✓ Kuban Krasnodar; ✓ Sokol Saratov; ✓ Druzhba Maikop; ✓ Atommash Volgodonsk; ✓ Uralan Elista
✓ Spartak Moscow; ✓ Dnipro Dnipropetrovsk; ✓ Zalgiris Vilnius; ✓ Torpedo Moscow; ✓ Dinamo Minsk; ✓ Dynamo Kyiv; ✓ Shakhtar Donetsk; ✓ Ararat Erevan; ✓ Neftchi Baku; ✓ Dinamo Moscow; ✓ Metalist Kharkiv; ✓ Kairat Alma-Ata; ✓ Iberia Tbilisi; ✓ Zenit Leningrad; ✓ CSKA Moscow (v); ✓ Guria Lanchkhuti (v)	✓ Chornomorets Odesa (^); ✓ Lokomotiv Moscow (^); ✓ Daugava Riga; ✓ Pamir Dushambe; ✓ SKA Karpaty Lviv; ✓ Kuzbass Kemerovo; ✓ Pakhtakor Tashkent; ✓ Kolos Nikopol; ✓ Metalurh Zaporizhzhia; ✓ Rostselmash Rostov-na-Donu; ✓ SKA Rostov-na-Donu; ✓ Geolog Tyumen; ✓ Kotaik Abovian; ✓ Shinnik Yaroslavl; ✓ Dinamo Stavropol; ✓ Zorya Luhansk; ✓ Rotor Volgograd; ✓ Spartak Ordzhonikidze; ✓ Dinamo Batumi; ✓ Fakel Voronezh (v); ✓ Torpedo Kutaisi (v); ✓ Krylya Sovietov Kuibyshev (v)	✓ SKA Khabarovsk; ✓ Irtysh Omsk; ✓ Dinamo Barnaul; ✓ Zvezda Irkutsk	✓ Nistru Kishenev (^); ✓ Atlantas Klapeida; ✓ Metallurg Lipetsk; ✓ Avangard Kursk; ✓ Tekstilschik Tiraspol; ✓ Spartak Tambov	✓ Tavriya Simferopol; ✓ Nyva Ternopil; ✓ Kryvbas Kryvyi Rih; ✓ Nyva Vinnytsia; ✓ Torpedo Lutsk; ✓ SKA Kyiv
✓ Spartak Moscow; ✓ Dnipro Dnipropetrovsk; ✓ Zalgiris Vilnius; ✓ Torpedo Moscow; ✓ Dinamo Minsk; ✓ Dynamo Kyiv; ✓ Shakhtar Donetsk; ✓ Ararat Erevan; ✓ Neftchi Baku; ✓ Dinamo Moscow; ✓ Metalist Kharkiv; ✓ Kairat Alma-Ata; ✓ Iberia Tbilisi; ✓ Zenit Leningrad; ✓ CSKA Moscow (v); ✓ Guria Lanchkhuti (v)	✓ Chornomorets Odesa (^); ✓ Lokomotiv Moscow (^); ✓ Daugava Riga; ✓ Pamir Dushambe; ✓ SKA Karpaty Lviv; ✓ Kuzbass Kemerovo; ✓ Pakhtakor Tashkent; ✓ Kolos Nikopol; ✓ Metalurh Zaporizhzhia; ✓ Rostselmash Rostov-na-Donu; ✓ SKA Rostov-na-Donu; ✓ Geolog Tyumen; ✓ Kotaik Abovian; ✓ Shinnik Yaroslavl; ✓ Dinamo Stavropol; ✓ Zorya Luhansk; ✓ Rotor Volgograd; ✓ Spartak Ordzhonikidze; ✓ Dinamo Batumi; ✓ Fakel Voronezh (v); ✓ Torpedo Kutaisi (v); ✓ Krylya Sovietov Kuibyshev (v)	✓ Neftyanik Fergana; ✓ Dinamo Samarkand; ✓ Sokhibkor Khalkabad; ✓ Pakhtakor Andizhan	✓ Meliorator Chimkent; ✓ Khimik Dzhambul; ✓ Tselinnik Tselinograd; ✓ Energetik Kustanai	✓ Dinamo Sukhumi; ✓ Kolkheti Poti; ✓ Kyapaz Kirovabad; ✓ Dila Gori

Source: []

Notes

The five teams relegated from the 1986 Soviet First League are underlined in the table.

== Competition schedule ==
=== First preliminary round ===
Team 1	Score	Team 2
June 6
Avangard Kursk (III)	2–0	(II) Rostselmash Rostov-na-Donu
Atlantas Klapeida (III)	2–1 (a.e.t.)	(II) Chernomorets Odessa
Geolog Tyumen (II)	5–1	(III) Sokhibkor Khalkabad
Daugava Riga (II)	2–1	(III) Nistru Kishinev
Dinamo Barnaul (III)	0–0 (5–6 p)	(III) Neftyanik Fergana
Dinamo Batumi (II)	0–2	(III) Krasnaya Presnya Moscow
Dinamo Sukhumi (III)	3–1	(III) Uralmash Sverdlovsk
Druzhba Maikop (III)	1–0	(II) Fakel Voronezh
Zarya Kaluga (III)	0–1	(II) SKA Rostov-na-Donu
Zenit Izhevsk (III)	1–2 (a.e.t.)	(II) Lokomotiv Moscow
Kolos Nikopol (II)	2–0	(III) Iskra Smolensk
Kolkheti Poti (III)	1–0	(III) Tekstilshchik Ivanovo
Kotayk Abovyan (II)	1–1 (3–2 p)	(III) Zvezda Perm
Krivbass Krivoi Rog (III)	3–3 (4–3 p)	(III) SKA Kiev
Krylia Sovetov Kuibyshev (II)	2–1	(III) Dinamo Samarkand
Kuban Krasnodar (III)	1–2	(III) Atommash Volgodonsk
Kuzbass Kemerovo (II)	1–0	(III) Zvezda Irkutsk
Metallurg Zaporozhie (II)	4–1	(III) Tavria Simferopol
Metallurg Lipetsk (III)	5–2	(III) Znamia Truda Oryekhovo-Zuyevo
Niva Ternopol (III)	3–2	(II) Zarya Voroshilovgrad
Pamir Dushanbe (II)	1–0	(III) SKA Khabarovsk
Pakhtakor Andizhan (III)	2–0	(III) Meliorator Chimkent
Rotor Volgograd (II)	5–1	(III) Dila Gori
SKA Karpaty Lvov (II)	2–0	(III) Niva Vinnitsa
Sokol Saratov (III)	2–0	(II) Dinamo Stavropol
Spartak Ordzhonikidze (II)	3–0	(III) Kyapaz Kirovabad
Torpedo Kutaisi (II)	2–0	(III) Irtysh Omsk
Torpedo Lutsk (III)	2–1	(III) Tekstilshchik Tiraspol
Uralan Elista (III)	2–1 (a.e.t.)	(III) Arsenal Tula
Khimik Dzhambul (III)	4–2	(III) Energetik Kustanai
Tselinnik Tselinograd (III)	1–2	(II) Pakhtakor Tashkent
Shinnik Yaroslavl (II)	3–2	(III) Spartak Tambov

=== Second preliminary round ===
Team 1	Score	Team 2
June 25
Atlantas Klapeida (III)	2–0	(II) Kolos Nikopol
Atommash Volgodonsk (III)	1–0 (a.e.t.)	(III) Sokol Saratov
Daugava Riga (II)	2–1	(II) Metallurg Zaporozhye
Druzhba Maikop (III)	3–2	(III) Avangard Kursk
Krasnaya Presnya Moscow (III)	1–0	(II) Torpedo Kutaisi
Krylia Sovetov Kuibyshev (II)	1–2	(II) Kuzbass Kemerovo
Lokomotiv Moscow (II)	4–1	(II) Kotaik Abovyan
Neftyanik Fergana (III)	1–0	(II) Pamir Dushanbe
Niva Ternopol (III)	2–1	(III) Krivbass Krivoi Rog
Pakhtakor Andizhan (III)	4–2	(II) Geolog Tyumen
Pakhtakor Tashkent (II)	3–1	(III) Khimik Dzhambul
Rotor Volgograd (II)	2–1	(III) Kolkheti Poti
SKA Rostov-na-Donu (II)	0–0 (6–7 p)	(III) Uralan Elista
Spartak Ordzhonikidze (II)	1–3	(III) Dinamo Sukhumi
Torpedo Lutsk (III)	1–0	(II) SKA Karpaty Lvov
Shinnik Yaroslavl (II)	1–0	(III) Metallurg Lipetsk

=== Bracket ===
Round of 32
Dinamo Minsk	2	0	2
Dinamo Sukhumi (a)	1	1	2
Metallist Kharkov	3	1	4
Krasnaya Presnia Moscow	1	1	2
Guria Lanchkhuti	4	1	5
Rotor Volgograd (a)	2	3	5
Dinamo Kiev	2	2	4
Lokomotiv Moscow	1	1	2
Zalgiris Vilnius	8	3	11
Neftianik Fergana	3	0	3
Kairat Alma-Ata	1	0	1
Pakhtakor Tashkent	0	2	2
Dinamo Moscow	1	0	1
Kuzbass Kemerovo (p)	0	1	1
Neftchi Baku	4	3	7
Pakhtakor Andizhan	0	0	0
Dnepr Dnepropetrovsk	10	3	13
Uralan Elista	0	0	0
Ararat Yerevan	6	4	10
Atommash Volgodonsk	2	2	4
Dinamo Tbilisi	4	2	6
Shinnik Yaroslavl	1	0	1
Zenit Leningrad	3	0	3
Druzhba Maikop	1	1	2
Spartak Moscow	1	2	3
Daugava Riga	0	1	1
Shakhter Donetsk	2	4	6
Niva Ternopol	0	0	0
Torpedo Moscow	1	1	2
Atlantas Klapeida	1	0	1
CSKA Moscow	1	0	1
Torpedo Lutsk	0	0	0

Round of 16
Metallist Kharkov	3	2	5
Dinamo Sukhumi	0	1	1
Dinamo Kiev	3	0	3
Rotor Volgograd	2	2	4
Pakhtakor Tashkent	0	1	1
Zalgiris Vilnius	1	2	3
Neftchi Baku	5	0	5
Kuzbass Kemerovo	1	1	2
Ararat Yerevan	3	1	4
Dnepr Dnepropetrovsk	1	4	5
Zenit Leningrad	0	0	0
Dinamo Tbilisi	0	1	1
Shakhter Donetsk	0	1	1
Spartak Moscow	1	2	3
CSKA Moscow	1	0	1
Torpedo Moscow	0	4	4

Quarterfinals
Metallist Kharkov	1
Rotor Volgograd	0
Zalgiris Vilnius	2
Neftchi Baku	1
Dnepr Dnepropetrovsk	2
Dinamo Tbilisi	1
Torpedo Moscow (a.e.t.)	1
Spartak Moscow	0

Semifinals
Zalgiris Vilnius	1
Metallist Kharkov	2
Torpedo Moscow (a.e.t.)	1
Dnepr Dnepropetrovsk	0

Final
Torpedo Moscow	0
Metallist Kharkov	2

=== Round of 32 ===
Team 1	Agg.	Team 2	1st leg	2nd leg
First leg – July 5, Second leg – July 18
CSKA Moscow (I)	1–0	(III) Torpedo Lutsk	1–0	0–0
Ararat Yerevan (I)	10–4	(III) Atommash Volgodonsk	6–2	4–2
Spartak Moscow (I)	3–1	(II) Daugava Riga	1–0	2–1
First leg – July 6, Second leg – July 18
Guria Lanchkhuti (I)	5–5 (a)	(II) Rotor Volgograd	4–2	1–3
Dinamo Kiev (I)	4–2	(II) Lokomotiv Moscow	2–1	2–1
Dinamo Minsk (I)	2–2 (a)	(III) Dinamo Sukhumi	2–1	0–1
Dinamo Moscow (I)	1–1 (1–3 p)	(II) Kuzbass Kemerovo	1–0	0–1
Dinamo Tbilisi (I)	6–1	(II) Shinnik Yaroslavl	4–1	2–0
Dnepr Dnepropetrovsk (I)	13–0	(III) Uralan Elista	10–0	3–0
Zenit Leningrad (I)	3–2	(III) Druzhba Maikop	3–1	0–1
Kairat Alma-Ata (I)	1–2	(II) Pakhtakor Tashkent	1–0	0–2
Metallist Kharkov (I)	4–2	(III) Krasnaya Presnia Moscow	3–1	1–1
Neftchi Baku (I)	7–0	(III) Pakhtakor Andizhan	4–0	3–0
Torpedo Moscow (I)	2–1	(III) Atlantas Klapeida	1–1	1–0
Shakhter Donetsk (I)	6–0	(III) Niva Ternopol	2–0	4–0
First leg – August 2, Second leg – August 6
Zalgiris Vilnius (I)	11–3	(III) Neftyanik Fergana	8–3	3–0

=== Round of 16 ===
First leg games all took place on September 12, 1987, while most second leg games were played from September 30–October 3.

Team 1	Agg.	Team 2	1st leg	2nd leg
First leg – August 2, Second leg – August 16
Shakhter Donetsk (I)	1–3	(I) Spartak Moscow	0–1	1–2
First leg – August 4, Second leg – August 15
Ararat Yerevan (I)	4–5	(I) Dnepr Dnepropetrovsk	3–1	1–4
Zenit Leningrad (I)	0–1	(I) Dinamo Tbilisi	0–0	0–1
Metallist Kharkov (I)	5–1	(III) Dinamo Sukhumi	3–0	2–1
Neftchi Baku (I)	5–2	(II) Kuzbass Kemerovo	5–1	0–1
CSKA Moscow (I)	1–4	(I) Torpedo Moscow	1–0	0–4
First leg – September 29, Second leg – October 20
Pakhtakor Tashkent (II)	1–3	(I) Zalgiris Vilnius	1–2	0–1
First leg – November 20, Second leg – November 24
Dinamo Kiev (I)	3–4	(II) Rotor Volgograd	3–2	0–2

=== Quarter-finals ===
Team 1	Score	Team 2
April 12
Metallist Kharkov (I)	1–0	(II) Rotor Volgograd
April 13
Dnepr Dnepropetrovsk (I)	2–1	(I) Dinamo Tbilisi
Zalgiris Vilnius (I)	2–1	(I) Neftchi Baku
Torpedo Moscow (I)	1–0 (a.e.t.)	(I) Spartak Moscow

=== Semi-finals ===
Team 1	Score	Team 2
May 18
Torpedo Moscow (I)	1–0 (a.e.t.)	(I) Dnipro Dnipropetrovsk
Zalgiris Vilnius (I)	1–2	(I) Metalist Kharkiv

=== Final ===
28 May 1988
?:? LST

Torpedo Moscow	0 – 2	Metalist Kharkiv
	Report	Adzhoyev 42' (pen.); Baranov 61'

Dynamo Stadium, Moscow
Attendance: 30,000
Referee: I.Timoshenko (Rostov-na-Donu)
