= Oleksandr Baranov =

Ukrainian footballer (born 1960)

Personal information
- Full name: Oleksandr Ivanovych Baranov
- Date of birth: 29 April 1960 (age 66)
- Place of birth: Kyiv, Ukrainian SSR, Soviet Union
- Height: 1.97 m (6 ft 5 1/2 in)
- Position: Midfielder

Senior career*
Years	Team	Apps	(Gls)
1978–1981	FC Dynamo Kyiv	0	(0)
1982–1983	SC Tavriya Simferopol	83	(20)
1984	FC Spartak Moscow	2	(0)
1985	FC Dynamo Kyiv	0	(0)
1986–1990	FC Metalist Kharkiv	102	(8)
1991	KontU Helsinki	19	(5)
1992–1994	LoPa	?	(25)
1994	FC Metalist Kharkiv	4	(0)
1994	FC Nyva Myronivka	1	(0)
1994	FC Kontu-72	?	(9)
1994–1996	KontU Helsinki	36	(5)
1997–2002	FC Viikingit		
2003–2004	KontU Helsinki	18	(5)

Managerial career
- 2004–2005: FC Arsenal Kyiv
- * Club domestic league appearances and goals

Oleksandr Ivanovych Baranov (Ukrainian: Олександр Іванович Баранов; born 29 April 1960) is a Ukrainian professional football coach and a former player.

== Career ==
He played 4 games in the European Cup Winners' Cup 1988–89 for FC Metalist Kharkiv.

== Honours ==
- Soviet Top League runner-up: 1984.
- Soviet Cup winner: 1988.
- USSR Federation Cup finalist: 1987, 1989.

== Personal life ==
His son Ivan Baranov is a professional footballer.
