= Ukrsibbank =

Commercial bank in Ukraine, subsidiary of BNP Paribas since 2006

JSC Ukrsibbank

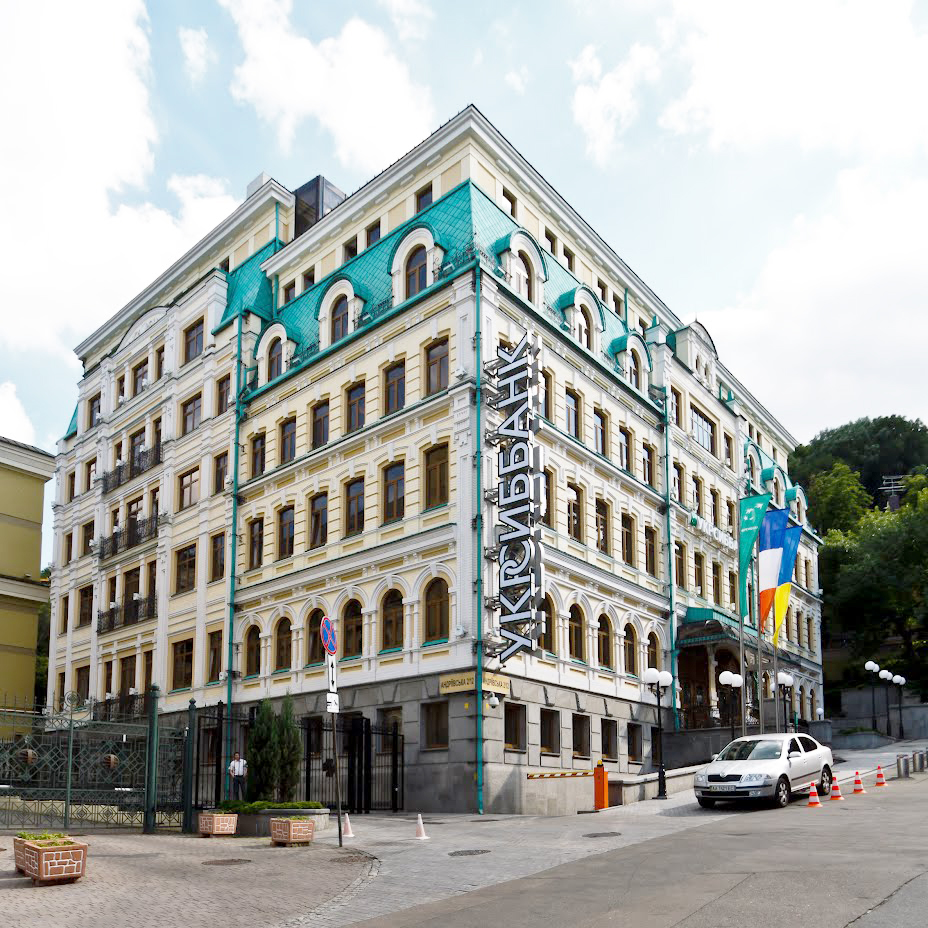
- Head office in Kyiv
- Trade name: Ukrsibbank BNP Paribas Group
- Native name: АТ Укрсиббанк
- Romanized name: Ukrsybbank
- Formerly: Kharkivinkombank (1990-1992)
- Company type: commercial bank
- Industry: Finance and Insurance
- Founded: June 18, 1990; 35 years ago in Kharkiv, Ukraine
- Headquarters: Kyiv, Ukraine
- Net income: 4,340 billion UAH (01.01.2024)
- Total assets: 142,454 billion UAH (01.01.2024)
- Owner: BNP Paribas S.A. (60%); European Bank for Reconstruction and Development (40%)
- Number of employees: 5,000+
- Website: ukrsibbank.com/en/

JSC Ukrsibbank (Ukrainian: АТ Укрсиббанк), majority-owned by BNP Paribas since 2006, is a commercial bank based in Ukraine. It was founded in 1990 in Kharkiv and is named for its controlling shareholder later during the 1990s, the Ukrainian-Siberian Corporation. It operates a network of 200 branches and 700 ATMs throughout Ukraine, for 1.9 million customers all around Ukraine, 165,000 SME companies, and 2,200 large corporate companies. It is the third-largest bank in Ukraine. In early 2024, it was confirmed by the National Bank of Ukraine as one of the country's systemically important banks.

== History ==
UKRSIBBANK was founded in 1990. Over the first two years, it operated on the financial market as Kharkiv regional bank that serviced large corporate customers.

In 1996 the bank started opening branches in other regions of Ukraine, and since 2000 it has been building up an extensive branch network. Being actively engaged in servicing individuals and legal entities, UKRSIBBANK has been constantly extending the list of banking services and products and conquering new market segments.

In December 2005, UKRSIBBANK and BNP Paribas, one of the world's largest financial groups, signed a share purchase agreement on 51% of UKRSIBBANK's shares.

In April 2006, BNP Paribas became the strategic investor at UKRSIBBANK, with a share of 51%. In 2009, the share increased to 81.42%, and in 2010 to 99.99%. In August 2011, the procedure for the acquisition of 15% of shares of UKRSIBBANK was completed by the European Bank for Reconstruction and Development (EBRD), after which the share of BNP Paribas reduced to 84.99%.

In February 2016, the size of the EBRD's share increased to 40%, subsequently decreasing BNP Paribas' share to 59.99%.

In February 2018, BNP Paribas bought UKRSIBBANK shares from minority shareholders, increasing its share to 60%.

In 2021, Expert Rating Agency evaluated the long-term credit rating of Ukrsibbank as being at uaAAA according to the national Ukrainian scale—the highest level on the scale.

== Activity ==
The bank has positions in corporate banking, retail banking, and in the consumer finance segment.

It offers banking products, such as online banking (all-inclusive package) and flexible deposits (Active Money).

One of the major world banking systems, BNP Paribas, which owns 60% of shares in the bank, is a strategic investor of JSC «UKRSIBBANK». International Company LLC AF «PriceWaterhouseCoopers (Audit)» and audit firm LLC «Ukrainian Audit Service» act as the bank's auditors.

== Shareholders and leadership ==
The official ceremony of the share purchase agreement signing, dedicated to purchasing of 51% of shares of JSC «UKRSIBBANK» took place on December 20, 2005. Today, the bank is 59.99% owned by BNP Paribas and 40% by the EBRD.

=== Management Board ===
- Laurent Philippe Nicolas Charles Dupuch, Chairman of the Management Board
- Andrii Kashperuk, Deputy Chairman of the Management Board of Retail Banking
- Anton Gromko, Deputy Chairman of the Management Board, Head of Finance Department
- Serhii Zagorulko, Deputy Chairman of the Management Board, IT Director
- Yuliia Kadulina, Deputy Chairman of the Management Board, Personal Finance Director
- Dmytrо Tsаpеnkо, Deputy Chairman of the Management Board, Head of the Corporate Banking Department
- Olena Polianchuk, Deputy Chairman of the Management Board, Head of Legal Department

=== Supervisory Board ===
- François Bénaroya, Head of the Supervisory Board
- Luc Delvaux, Member of the Supervisory Board
- Mariusz Warych, Member of the Supervisory Board
- Vincent Metz, Member of the Supervisory Board
- Bertrand Barrier, Member of the Supervisory Board
- Zulfira Akhmedova, Member of the Supervisory Board
- Pierre Mietkowski, Member of the Supervisory Board
- Dmytro Sholomko, Member of the Supervisory Board
- Wojciech Maria Sass, Member of the Supervisory Board

== Memberships ==
- Principal member of Mastercard International
- Principal member of Visa International
- Ukrainian Interbank Exchange Market (UIEM)
- OJSC «Interregional Fund Union» (IFU)
- Ukrainian Banks Association (UBA)
- Kyiv Bank Union (KBU)
- First Stock Trading System (FSTS)
- SWIFT
- Ukrainian Individual Deposits Guarantee Fund
- Ukrainian Taxpayers Association
- Global ATM Alliance

== Awards ==
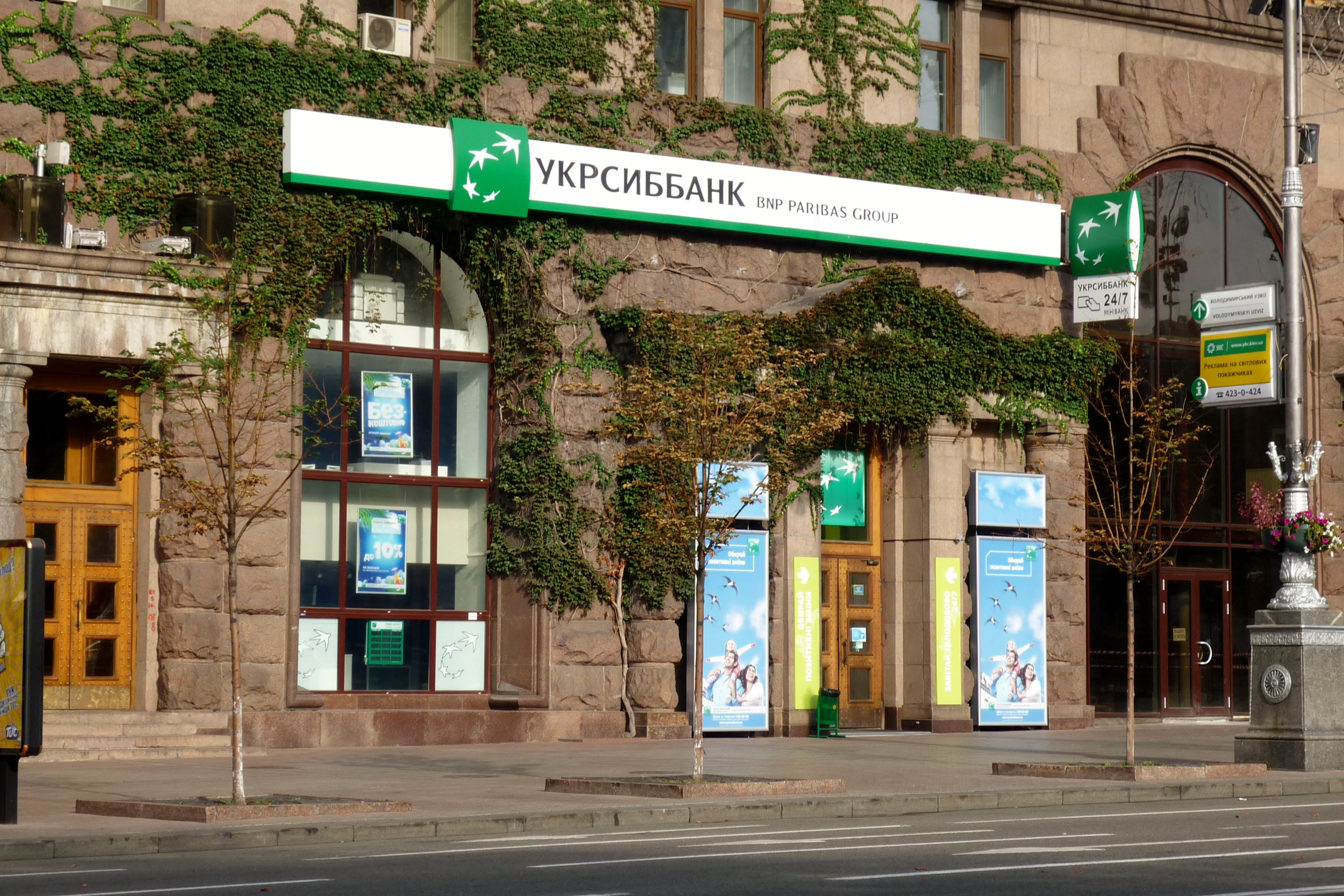
Ukrsibbank branch on Kyiv's Khreshchatyk

- TOP-3 among Ukraine’s most sustainable banks according to the popular Ukrainian online media Forinsurer.com
- TOP Employer 2020 in Ukraine and Europe as part of BNP Paribas, Top Employer Institute Certification
- No.1 in the Ukrainian Bank's Viability Rating according to the independent business portal Mind.UA
- No.2 as The Best Internet Bank according to the FinAwards2020
- No.3 UKRSIB online as the Best Mobile Bank according to the FinAwards2020 results
- ТОР-3 among Ukraine’s Best Employers in Financial Sector according to the independent Randstad Employer Brand Research
- Payment Card Industry Data Security Standard Certification – International Security Audit (PCI DSS)
- Women In Business, the Program to Support Female Entrepreneurs, was included in the first report of the UN Global Compact for Ukraine as part of its commitment to achieving 17 sustainable development goals
- No.1 among Ukrainian banks for depositor loyalty according to the Minfin portal
- No.2 in the Minfin Portal’s Bank Resilience Rating following the 2Q of 2020
- No.2 in the Ukrainian Banks Viability Rating according to the independent business portal Mind.UA
- Best Legal Departments 2020 following the independent survey «Top-50 Legal Departments of Ukraine»
- No.2 in the Most Reliable Banks of Ukraine Rating 2019 according to the investment company Dragon Capital
- Good Place to Work – The Best Employer Branding Project, HR Brand Ukraine Award grc.ua. The Best Premium Banking Service in Ukraine according to Mastercard.
- ТОР-3 «Cycling-Friendly Employer 2020» according to the Kyiv Cyclists’ Association U-Cycle
- No.1 «Sustainable Development Goal No.3 — Good Health and Well-Being» in the context of Corporate Social Responsibility cases 2020, Center for the CSR Development Ukraine.

== See also ==
- Oleksandr Yaroslavskyi
- List of banks in Ukraine
