= 1977 Soviet Second League =

Second League
- Season: 1977

1977 Soviet Second League was a Soviet competition in the Soviet Second League.

== Qualifying groups ==
=== Group I [Northwest and Central] ===
Pos	Rep	Team	Pld	W	D	L	GF	GA	GD	Pts
1	LTU	Žalgiris Vilnius	40	30	8	2	80	21	+59	68
2	RUS	Iskra Smolensk	40	24	10	6	61	26	+35	58
3	LVA	Daugava Riga	40	24	7	9	81	42	+39	55
4	RUS	Lokomotiv Kaluga	40	21	10	9	55	29	+26	52
5	LTU	Atlantas Klaipeda	40	19	12	9	51	36	+15	50
6	BLR	Khimik Grodno	40	17	12	11	45	36	+9	46
7	RUS	Volga Kalinin	40	18	10	12	54	46	+8	46
8	RUS	Spartak Kostroma	40	17	9	14	49	42	+7	43
9	RUS	Baltika Kaliningrad	40	19	5	16	43	54	−11	43
10	RUS	Mashinostroitel Tula	40	16	9	15	51	34	+17	41
11	BLR	Dinamo Brest	40	14	13	13	51	44	+7	41
12	BLR	Dnepr Mogilyov	40	15	11	14	44	41	+3	41
13	RUS	Dinamo Vologda	40	13	8	19	36	34	+2	34
14	BLR	Dvina Vitebsk	40	11	12	17	29	38	−9	34
15	RUS	Khimik Novomoskovsk	40	14	5	21	31	57	−26	33
16	BLR	Mashinostroitel Gomel	40	12	8	20	32	49	−17	32
17	RUS	Saturn Rybinsk	40	9	12	19	31	46	−15	30
18	LVA	Zvejnieks Liepaja	40	9	12	19	34	53	−19	30
19	RUS	Electron Novgorod	40	9	6	25	37	70	−33	24
20	RUS	Sever Murmansk	40	7	8	25	40	79	−39	22
21	RUS	Dinamo Bryansk	40	6	5	29	30	98	−68	17

=== Group II [Ukraine] ===
Pos	Team	Pld	W	D	L	GF	GA	GD	Pts	Promotion or relegation
1	SKA Odessa (C, P)	44	31	6	7	85	31	+54	68	Promoted
2	SKA Kiev	44	26	11	7	63	32	+31	63	
3	Kolos Nikopol	44	25	12	7	72	35	+37	62	
4	Metalist Kharkiv	44	22	16	6	59	24	+35	60	
5	Zirka Kirovohrad	44	21	15	8	52	27	+25	57	
6	Hoverla Uzhhorod	44	20	15	9	51	32	+19	55	
7	Krystal Kherson	44	20	12	12	54	40	+14	52	
8	Spartak Zhytomyr	44	18	14	12	51	34	+17	50	
9	Bukovyna Chernivtsi	44	19	11	14	46	29	+17	49	
10	SKA Lviv	44	16	16	12	61	43	+18	48	
11	Sudnobudivnyk Mykolaiv	44	16	13	15	55	52	+3	45	
12	Novator Zhdanov	44	17	10	17	53	57	−4	44	
13	Atlantyka Sevastopol	44	15	11	18	49	46	+3	41	
14	Desna Chernihiv	44	11	16	17	34	42	−8	38	
15	Lokomotyv Vinnytsia	44	14	8	22	47	70	−23	36	
16	Khvylya Khmelnytskyi	44	10	15	19	33	50	−17	35	
17	Frunzenets Sumy	44	13	7	24	35	56	−21	33	
18	Speranța Drochia	44	12	9	23	43	73	−30	33	Moldavian SSR
19	Torpedo Lutsk	44	12	8	24	35	70	−35	32	
20	Avanhard Rovno	44	8	14	22	31	64	−33	30	
21	Kolos Poltava	44	10	8	26	36	64	−28	28	
22	Shakhtar Horlivka	44	9	9	26	32	63	−31	27	
23	Dnipro Cherkasy	44	8	10	26	26	69	−43	26	Avoided relegation

(C) Champions; (P) Promoted

=== Group III [Volga–Russian South] ===
Pos	Team	Pld	W	D	L	GF	GA	GD	Pts
1	Kuban Krasnodar	40	29	6	5	90	33	+57	64
2	Fakel Voronezh (Note: Trud Voronezh changed name to Fakel.)	40	24	8	8	67	34	+33	56
3	Spartak Ryazan	40	21	12	7	54	29	+25	54
4	Textilshchik Ivanovo	40	20	11	9	71	39	+32	51
5	Rotor Volgograd	40	19	11	10	52	42	+10	49
6	RostSelMash Rostov-na-Donu	40	19	10	11	57	38	+19	48
7	Dinamo Stavropol	40	18	11	11	59	43	+16	47
8	Mashuk Pyatigorsk	40	16	12	12	47	40	+7	44
9	Znamya Truda Orekhovo-Zuyevo	40	13	13	14	42	47	−5	39
10	Volgar Astrakhan	40	13	13	14	46	52	−6	39
11	Salyut Belgorod	40	14	10	16	48	52	−4	38
12	Khimik Dzerzhinsk	40	11	14	15	41	50	−9	36
13	Torpedo Taganrog	40	12	10	18	49	52	−3	34
14	Novolipetsk Lipetsk	40	10	13	17	46	49	−3	33
15	Torpedo Vladimir	40	9	15	16	35	51	−16	33
16	Avangard Kursk	40	12	9	19	38	57	−19	33
17	Spartak Oryol	40	10	10	20	38	60	−22	30
18	Volga Gorkiy	40	10	10	20	43	69	−26	30
19	Uralan Elista	40	10	9	21	33	67	−34	29
20	Torpedo Volzhskiy	40	10	8	22	33	61	−28	28
21	Revtrud Tambov	40	8	9	23	36	60	−24	25

=== Group IV [Caucasus and Ural] ===
Pos	Rep	Team	Pld	W	D	L	GF	GA	GD	Pts
1	RUS	Spartak Nalchik (Note: Elbrus Nalchik changed name to Spartak.)	42	25	10	7	63	33	+30	60
2	RUS	Dinamo Makhachkala	42	23	9	10	77	48	+29	55
3	ARM	Shirak Leninakan	42	25	5	12	81	52	+29	55
4	GEO	Guria Lanchkhuti	42	22	7	13	91	57	+34	51
5	RUS	Sokol Saratov	42	20	8	14	72	54	+18	48
6	RUS	Torpedo Togliatti	42	19	9	14	62	47	+15	47
7	AZE	Avtomobilist Baku	42	19	8	15	63	56	+7	46
8	GEO	Dinamo Zugdidi	42	17	11	14	53	51	+2	45
9	GEO	Dinamo Batumi	42	18	8	16	60	52	+8	44
10	RUS	Druzhba Maykop	42	16	12	14	56	54	+2	44
11	RUS	Druzhba Yoshkar-Ola	42	17	9	16	57	55	+2	43
12	GEO	Lokomotiv Samtredia	42	13	14	15	61	59	+2	40
13	GEO	Dila Gori	42	16	8	18	63	75	−12	40
14	GEO	Dinamo Sukhumi	42	14	11	17	47	62	−15	39
15	RUS	Dinamo Kirov	42	16	6	20	45	58	−13	38
16	RUS	Gastello Ufa (Note: Stroitel Ufa changed name to Gastello.)	42	16	5	21	60	58	+2	37
17	ARM	SKIF Yerevan	42	12	13	17	44	50	−6	37
18	RUS	Zenit Izhevsk	42	14	8	20	66	55	+11	36
19	RUS	Turbina Naberezhnyye Chelny	42	13	7	22	49	57	−8	33
20	AZE	Progress Kirovabad	42	12	8	22	39	71	−32	32
21	GEO	Spartak Tbilisi	42	11	8	23	42	78	−36	30
22	AZE	Araz Nahichevan	42	10	4	28	33	102	−69	24

=== Group V [Central Asia and West Siberia] ===
Pos	Rep	Team	Pld	W	D	L	GF	GA	GD	Pts
1	UZB	Yangiyer (Note: Meliorator Yangiyer changed name to Yangiyer.)	40	24	8	8	68	37	+31	56
2	KGZ	Alga Frunze	40	24	6	10	67	32	+35	54
3	UZB	Avtomobilist Termez	40	23	7	10	61	38	+23	53
4	UZB	Horezm Yangiaryk	40	20	8	12	50	35	+15	48
5	UZB	Irrigator Jizak	40	18	9	13	66	43	+23	45
6	UZB	Neftyanik Fergana	40	19	5	16	72	47	+25	43
7	UZB	Shahrihanets Shahrihan	40	20	3	17	56	42	+14	43
8	UZB	Zarafshan Navoi	40	16	11	13	51	47	+4	43
9	KAZ	Khimik Jambul	40	18	7	15	58	60	−2	43
10	RUS	Gazovik Orenburg	40	18	4	18	55	47	+8	40
11	UZB	Pahtachi Gulistan	40	17	6	17	52	52	0	40
12	RUS	Signal Chelyabinsk	40	13	13	14	44	51	−7	39
13	TJK	Hojent Leninabad	40	15	8	17	58	70	−12	38
14	KAZ	Metallurg Chimkent	40	14	9	17	43	46	−3	37
15	UZB	Dinamo Samarkand	40	13	10	17	50	51	−1	36
16	KAZ	Orbita Kzil-Orda	40	16	4	20	50	57	−7	36
17	RUS	Uralets Nizhniy Tagil	40	16	4	20	42	60	−18	36
18	KAZ	Aktyubinets Aktyubinsk	40	13	9	18	46	50	−4	35
19	RUS	Metallurg Magnitogorsk	40	13	7	20	46	50	−4	33
20	RUS	Neftyanik Tyumen	40	12	7	21	44	65	−21	31
21	UZB	Amudarya Nukus	40	3	5	32	22	121	−99	11

=== Group VI (Kazakhstan and East Siberia) ===
Pos	Rep	Team	Pld	W	D	L	GF	GA	GD	Pts
1	KAZ	Spartak Semipalatinsk	38	20	13	5	67	39	+28	53
2	RUS	SKA Khabarovsk	38	20	8	10	61	32	+29	48
3	KAZ	Traktor Pavlodar	38	20	8	10	56	28	+28	48
4	RUS	Luch Vladivostok	38	19	8	11	48	40	+8	46
5	RUS	Chkalovets Novosibirsk	38	16	11	11	59	41	+18	43
6	RUS	Amur Blagoveshchensk	38	16	11	11	44	33	+11	43
7	RUS	Zvezda Irkutsk	38	17	9	12	47	38	+9	43
8	RUS	Dinamo Barnaul	38	15	12	11	43	36	+7	42
9	KAZ	Shakhtyor Karaganda	38	16	10	12	43	37	+6	42
10	KAZ	Tselinnik Tselinograd	38	17	7	14	50	49	+1	41
11	KAZ	Vostok Ust-Kamenogorsk	38	14	10	14	41	38	+3	38
12	KAZ	Gornyak Nikolskiy	38	15	7	16	38	39	−1	37
13	RUS	Irtysh Omsk	38	13	10	15	44	44	0	36
14	RUS	Avtomobilist Krasnoyarsk	38	13	8	17	44	53	−9	34
15	RUS	Angara Angarsk	38	12	10	16	33	52	−19	34
16	RUS	Torpedo Rubtsovsk	38	9	15	14	33	39	−6	33
17	RUS	Energiya Bratsk	38	12	9	17	48	56	−8	33
18	RUS	Torpedo Tomsk	38	7	12	19	38	59	−21	26
19	RUS	Lokomotiv Chita	38	5	16	17	35	70	−35	26
20	RUS	Selenga Ulan-Ude	38	3	8	27	26	75	−49	14

Source: rsssf.com

== Promotion playoffs ==
[Oct 31, Nov 5]
Spartak Semipalatinsk  2-2 0-3  SKA Odessa 
Kuban Krasnodar        2-0 1-2  Yangiyer 
Spartak Nalchik        1-0 0-1  Žalgiris Vilnius

=== Additional finals ===
[Nov 8]
KUBAN Krasnodar        2-0  Yangiyer         [in Simferopol] 
ŽALGIRIS Vilnius       2-1  Spartak Nalchik  [in Kishinev]
