= 1973 Soviet First League =

Soviet First League
- Season: 1973

The 1973 Soviet First League was the third season of the Soviet First League and the 33rd season of the Soviet second tier league competition.

== Final standings ==
Pos	Rep	Team	Pld	W	PKW	PKL	L	GF	GA	GD	Pts	Promotion or relegation
1	UKR	(Ukrainian Soviet Socialist Republic) Chornomorets Odessa (C, P)	38	24	4	2	8	83	38	+45	52	Promotion to Top League
2	MDA	(Moldavian Soviet Socialist Republic) Nistru Chișinău (P)	38	25	2	5	6	71	35	+36	52	Promotion to Top League
3	RUS	(Russian Soviet Federative Socialist Republic) Lokomotiv Moscow	38	20	6	2	10	47	32	+15	46	
4	AZE	(Azerbaijan Soviet Socialist Republic) Neftçi Baku	38	17	5	3	13	58	43	+15	39	
5	RUS	(Russian Soviet Federative Socialist Republic) Metallurg Lipetsk	38	14	7	5	12	42	38	+4	35	
6	UKR	(Ukrainian Soviet Socialist Republic) Metalurh Zaporizhzhia	38	14	6	5	13	62	53	+9	34	
7	RUS	(Russian Soviet Federative Socialist Republic) Shinnik Yaroslavl	38	16	2	6	14	48	41	+7	34	
8	RUS	(Russian Soviet Federative Socialist Republic) Krylia Sovetov Kuibyshev	38	15	4	3	16	46	51	−5	34	
9	GEO	(Georgian Soviet Socialist Republic) Torpedo Kutaisi	38	16	2	2	18	40	46	−6	34	
10	UKR	(Ukrainian Soviet Socialist Republic) Spartak Ivano-Frankivsk	38	14	5	2	17	40	54	−14	33	
11	RUS	(Russian Soviet Federative Socialist Republic) Zvezda Perm	38	14	4	5	15	50	52	−2	32	
12	RUS	(Russian Soviet Federative Socialist Republic) Tekstilshchik Ivanovo	38	14	4	4	16	41	46	−5	32	
13	TKM	(Turkmen Soviet Socialist Republic) Stroitel Ashgabad	38	14	4	3	17	46	58	−12	32	
14	TJK	(Tajik Soviet Socialist Republic) Pamir Dushanbe	38	14	3	5	16	50	44	+6	31	
15	RUS	(Russian Soviet Federative Socialist Republic) Kuzbass Kemerovo	38	14	2	7	15	42	46	−4	30	
16	RUS	(Russian Soviet Federative Socialist Republic) Spartak Nalchik	38	12	6	2	18	46	61	−15	30	
17	RUS	(Russian Soviet Federative Socialist Republic) Spartak Orzhonikidze	38	13	4	3	18	29	44	−15	30	
18	KAZ	(Kazakh Soviet Socialist Republic) Shakhter Karagandy	38	12	4	5	17	42	60	−18	28	Relegated
19	UKR	(Ukrainian Soviet Socialist Republic) Metallist Kharkiv	38	11	5	4	18	34	50	−16	27	Relegated
20	KGZ	(Kirghiz Soviet Socialist Republic) Alga Frunze	38	6	2	8	22	29	54	−25	14	Relegated

Source: rsssf.com

== Number of teams by union republic ==
Rank	Union republic	Number of teams	Club(s)
1	RSFSR	9	Lokomotiv Moscow, Metallurg Lipetsk, Shinnik Yaroslavl, Krylia Sovetov Kuibyshev, Zvezda Perm, Tekstilschik Ivanovo, Kuzbass Kemerevo, Elbrus Nalchik, Spartak Ordzhonikidze
2	Ukrainian SSR	4	Chernomorets Odessa, Metallurg Zaporozhye, Prykarpatye Ivano-Frankovsk, Metallist Kharkov
3	Moldavian SSR	1	Nistru Kishinev
3	Azerbaijan SSR	1	Neftchi Baku
3	Georgian SSR	1	Torpedo Kutaisi
3	Turkmen SSR	1	Stroitel Ashkhabat
3	Tajik SSR	1	Pamir Dushanbe
3	Kazakh SSR	1	Shakhter Karaganda
3	Kyrgyz SSR	1	Alga Frunze

== See also ==
- Soviet First League
