= Viktor Vashchenko =

Russian footballer

Personal information
- Full name: Viktor Pavlovich Vashchenko
- Date of birth: 17 February 1965 (age 61)
- Place of birth: Belgorod, Russian SFSR
- Height: 1.70 m (5 ft 7 in)
- Position: Defender

Youth career
- 1977–1979: FC Salyut Belgorod
- 1979–1982: KhOSShISP Kharkiv

Senior career*
Years	Team	Apps	(Gls)
1983–1985	FC Mayak Kharkiv	114	(5)
1986–1989	FC Metalist Kharkiv	41	(0)
1989–1992	FC Fakel Voronezh	79	(1)
1992–1993	FC Pesch		
1993–1995	SpVg Frechen 20		
1995	FC Lokomotiv Nizhny Novgorod	8	(0)
1996–1997	FC Lokomotiv Liski	41	(1)
- * Club domestic league appearances and goals

Viktor Pavlovich Vashchenko (Ukrainian: Віктор Павлович Ващенко; Russian: Виктор Павлович Ващенко; born 17 February 1965) is a former Russian professional footballer.

== Club career ==
He made his professional debut in the Soviet Second League in 1985 for FC Mayak Kharkiv.

== Honours ==
- Soviet Cup winner: 1988.
