= FC Hazovyk-KhGV Kharkiv =

FC Hazovyk-KHV Kharkiv
- Full name: FC Hazovyk-KHV Kharkiv
- Founded: 2001
- Dissolved: 2008
- Ground: "Hazovyk", Krasnokutsk
- League: Druha Liha B
- 2007–08: 18th (last – club defunct)

FC Hazovyk-KHV Kharkiv (Ukrainian: Газовик-ХГВ) was a professional football team based in Kharkiv, Ukraine. KHV stands for Kharkiv Gas Drilling (Mining).

Established in 2001, they competed in five seasons in the Ukrainian Second League (Group B). The club withdrew from the competition during the winter break in the 2007–08 season. They played their games at "Hazovyk" stadium in Krasnokutsk.

== League and cup history ==
Season	Div.	Pos.	Pl.	W	D	L	GS	GA	P	Domestic Cup	Europe	Notes
2003–04	3rd "C"	7	30	15	3	12	37	34	48	1/32 finals		
2004–05	3rd "C"	6	28	12	7	9	36	35	43	1/32 finals		
2005–06	3rd "C"	7	24	10	7	7	41	34	37	1/32 finals		
2006–07	3rd "B"	11	28	8	7	13	20	36	31	1/32 finals		
2007–08	3rd "B"	18	34	1	3	30	14	41	6	1/64 finals		

== Head coaches ==
- 2003 – 2005 Ivan Panchyshyn
- 2005 Vitaliy Doroshenko

== See also ==
- UkrGasVydobuvannya
