= Leonid Tkachenko (footballer) =

Ukrainian-Russian football player and manager (1953–2024)

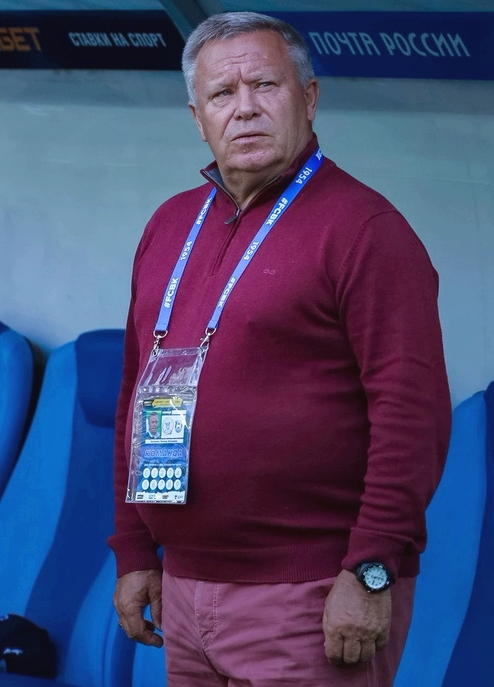

Personal information
- Full name: Leonid Ivanovich Tkachenko
- Date of birth: 1 October 1953
- Place of birth: Staryi Krym, Russian SFSR, Soviet Union
- Date of death: 4 January 2024 (aged 70)
- Place of death: Kaliningrad, Russia
- Height: 1.68 m (5 ft 6 in)
- Position: Half-back

Youth career
- 1966: Baltika Kaliningrad

Senior career*
Years	Team	Apps	(Gls)
1967–1970	Baltika Kaliningrad	0	(0)
1971–1972	Mashinostroitel Kaliningrad		
1973–1974	Vostok Kaliningrad		
1974	Druzhba Kaliningrad		
1975–1977	Spartak Zhytomyr	102	(16)
1978–1983	Metalist Kharkiv	220	(23)

Managerial career
- 1984–1986: Metalist Kharkiv (assistant)
- 1987–1988: Metalist Kharkiv (director)
- 1989–1993: Metalist Kharkiv
- 1992: Ukraine
- 1993–1994: Temp Shepetivka
- 1995–1998: Baltika Kaliningrad
- 1999: Sokol Saratov
- 2000: Metalist Kharkiv
- 2001–2002: Anzhi Makhachkala
- 2002–2003: Sokol Saratov
- 2005–2007: Baltika Kaliningrad
- 2007–2008: Dynamo St. Petersburg
- 2009–2010: Baltika Kaliningrad
- 2010: Baltika Kaliningrad (director of sports)
- 2010–2011: Baltika Kaliningrad
- 2011–2013: Petrotrest St. Petersburg
- 2013–2014: Sever Murmansk
- 2014–2015: Volga Tver
- 2019–2022: Baltika Kaliningrad (consultant)
- 2022–2024: Baltika Kaliningrad (assistant)
- * Club domestic league appearances and goals

Leonid Ivanovich Tkachenko (Russian: Леонид Иванович Ткаченко; 1 October 1953 – 4 January 2024) was a Ukrainian-Russian football coach and a Soviet player.

== Career ==
Tkachenko spent most of his career playing for Metalist Kharkiv, leading the club to promotion from the Soviet First League to the Soviet Top League in 1981.

Together with Mykola Pavlov he served as an interim coach for Ukraine national team when it contested Belarus in a friendly. He and Pavlov were assistant coaches to Viktor Prokopenko before then. Sometime in 2000, he relocated to the Russian Federation and obtained Russian citizenship.

== Death ==
Tkachenko died on 4 January 2024, at the age of 70.

== Honours ==
- Russian Second Division Zone West best manager: 2005.
