= FC Metalist Kharkiv =

Association football club based in Kharkiv, Ukraine

Metalist Kharkiv
- Full name: Футбо́льний Клуб Металі́ст Ха́рків; Football Club Metalist Kharkiv
- Nickname: Zhovto-syni (Yellow-blue)
- Founded: 11 December 1925; 100 years ago
- Ground: OSC Metalist; Avanhard
- Capacity: 40,003; 10,383
- Owner: Yevhen Krasnikov
- Head coach: Andriy Anishchenko
- League: Ukrainian First League
- 2025–26: Ukrainian First League, 7th of 16
- Website: fcmetalist.com.ua
Home colours	Away colours	Third colours

Football Club Metalist Kharkiv, also known as Football Club Metalist Kharkov or FC Metalist Kharkov (Ukrainian: Футбо́льний Клуб Металі́ст Ха́рків [metɐˈl⁽ʲ⁾ist ˈxɑrkiu̯]), is a Ukrainian professional football club based in Kharkiv that plays in the Ukrainian First League during the 2023–24 season. It was revived five years after the original FC Metalist Kharkiv ceased operations. Founded in 1925, FC Metalist Kharkiv had worked its way up the rungs of the Soviet football system, eventually being promoted to the Soviet Top League in 1960. After a difficult period which included relegation, Metalist was promoted to the Top League again in 1982, where it remained until the league's dissolution.

The club won the Soviet Cup once, and were also runners-up once. Following the dissolution of the Soviet Union, they have also won silver medals in the 2012–13 Ukrainian Premier League and six bronze medals in the Ukrainian Premier League, starting from the 2006–07 season. Their home was the Metalist Stadium, a multi-use facility with a capacity of 40,003. The stadium was originally built in 1926 and was expanded to host Euro 2012 football matches. Metalist ceased operations in 2016 due to insolvency. Metalist owed in salary to its players €32 million with €5 million to Cleiton Xavier in particular. It was removed from the Ukrainian Premier League after owner Serhiy Kurchenko absconded in February 2014, following the 2014 Ukrainian revolution.

Following the demise of Metalist Kharkiv in 2016, two new clubs were created in Kharkiv with variations of the Metalist club name. Since July 2016, a team named "SK Metalist Kharkiv" has been playing in the Kharkiv Oblast Championship, whose owner is Metalist owner Serhiy Kurchenko. In August 2016, another club named "FC Metalist 1925 Kharkiv" began to operate in the Ukrainian Amateur Football League with the stated intention of competing in the (professional) Ukrainian Second League as soon as possible. "FC Metalist 1925 Kharkiv" is owned by a company not linked with the original FC Metalist Kharkiv.

In October 2017, a Ukrainian court confiscated (the original) Metalist Kharkiv from Kurchenko and placed it under state property. At the time the club did not participate in any official sanctioned competitions. Also in July 2020, former FC Metalist sports director Yevhen Krasnikov created FC Metal Kharkiv which has since participated in the Ukrainian Second League. Earlier on 5 May 2020, Oleksandr Yaroslavskyi announced that he wishes to take care of the debts of the liquidated Metalist. The return of Yaroslavskyi to football arose some criticism connected with politics of the city of Kharkiv. After winning the Second League in June 2021, it was confirmed that Metal will be renamed to Metalist and the old FC Metalist Kharkiv logo will be returned to the club, along with its brand and history.

Following a season in the Ukrainian Premier League, in 2023 the revived Metalist was relegated back to the second tier where it struggled in performance as well as dealing with legal proceedings to claim back the Metalist heritage by paying off old debts.

== History ==
=== USSR competitions ===
The team has played under the following names:

- KhPZ (1925–1937, 1941) – factory team
  - Zenit (1938–1940)
- Dzerzhinets (1947–1952) – All-Union Dzerzhinets sports society (merger into Avangard in 1956)
- Avanhard/Avangard (1956–1967) – Republican Avanhard sports society (until 1957 All-Union Avangard sports society)
- Metalist/Metallist (since 1967) – All-Union Zenit sports society (part of reinstating and separating from Avanhard)

FC Metalist Kharkiv was initially founded on 11 December 1925 as KhPZ (Kharkovskiy Parovoznyi Zavod – Kharkiv Steam Locomotive Factory), when a local locomotive construction facility (Kharkiv Steam-locomotive Factory, today the Malyshev Factory) provided funding and allowed use of its land to start a football club. The first factory team however played under the name of "Parovoznik" since 1922. A big impulse for the development of football among factory teams was the construction of the Traktor Stadium (today Metalist Stadium), which was opened in September 1926. The stadium was built on a directive of Anastas Mikoyan (Minister of Foreign and Home Trade). It was built by workers of the Lokomotive Factory and became the biggest in the city. After the opening, a team of KhPZ met with the city team of Dnipropetrovsk (renamed in the previous month from Yekaterinoslav), tying the match in 2:2 with 8,000 spectators observing the match. In August 1927, the stadium hosted the Ukrainian Spartakiade final stage.

Ten years later, in 1935, the club won the city of Kharkiv championship, which allowed the club to enter the USSR Cup in the following season. Until World War II, the team was completely in the shadow of some other Kharkiv teams such as FC Dynamo Kharkiv, FC Silmash Kharkiv, and others. Among notable players of the early period, it should be mentioned Mykola Krotov, who in 1927 moved to KhPZ from the Dynamo's predecessor, Shturm Kharkiv.

Following World War II, the factory team joined the Dzerzhinets sports society assuming its name and resumed playing in local competitions, promoting itself to the Second Group (Soviet Second Division) in 1947 only to be demoted three seasons later. In the first post-war decade, the club was completely overshadowed by its other city rival FC Lokomotyv Kharkiv, which was a member of the Soviet Lokomotiv sports society.

In 1956, Metalist as Avanhard returned to the Soviet Second League B, replacing its city rivals Lokomotyv Kharkiv. Many players from Lokomotyv joined the Avanhard factory team among which were Heorhiy Borzenko, Mykola Uhraitskyi, Vitaliy Zub and others. Soon thereafter, Avanhard was promoted first to Soviet First League in 1958, and later to the Soviet Top League in 1960. The club stayed in the Top League for 4 seasons, but was demoted to the First League in 1963, continuing its decline with demotion to the Second League. In 1967, Avanhard Kharkiv was transferred to the reinstated All-Union Zenit sports society, which represented the defence industry. The team of football masters, however, picked its own name Metalist. There are two versions of who selected the name for the team: one is that it was Viktor Kanevskyi who coached the team; the second one is the team's owner, Malyshev Factory, which took into account the fact that the people of Kharkiv warmly embraced the name "Metalist"—the name given to the local stadium in the 1920s.

In 1978, the club was promoted to the Soviet First League and two years later, the club finished third in the competition, narrowly missing promotion to the top flight. The following season, the club improved on their previous performance and won the Soviet First League outright to earn a spot in the Soviet Top League. The club spent 10 seasons in the Soviet Top League with several successes on the domestic front. In 1983, Metalist was the runner-up in the USSR Cup (losing 1–0 to Shakhtar Donetsk) and a few years later in 1988 would win the cup, beating Torpedo Moscow 2–0. As a result, Metalist Kharkiv earned a trip to the UEFA Cup Winners' Cup. Metalist only advanced to the last sixteen of the competition, beating Yugoslavian side Borac Banja Luka and losing to the Dutch club Roda JC.

=== Transformation of Metalist from government organization to public ===
After the dissolution of the Soviet Union and the formation of an independent Ukraine, Metalist joined the inaugural season of the Ukrainian Higher League (Vyshcha Liha) in 1992. They finished 3rd in their group (5th-6th overall), as the first championship was held in two split groups. In August 1992, Malyshev Factory appointed Dmytro Droznyk as the president of FC Metalist. In an interview to gazeta.ua in 2008, Leonid Tkachenko, who was a head coach at that time, characterized Droznyk as a "successful businessman" and a "real bandit". He said that Droznyk "threw" him out of the club and organized a player sell-off. Later, Oleksandr Pryzetko, a former player, said that Tkachenko was actually being quite mild in talking about Droznyk. In the 1992–93 season, Metalist finished fifth. Following the winter break of the 1992–93 season, Leonid Tkachenko was replaced by Viktor Aristov. Before the 1993–94 season, Metalist hired coach Yevhen Lemeshko, with whom Metalist on two occasions reached the Soviet Cup finals and won it in the 1988; however, after selling off lots of players, the club struggled, and in late November 1993, Lemeshko was let go by mutual agreement. His replacements, Oleksandr Dovbiy and later Viktor Kamarzayev, who recently retired from his playing career, did not fix the situation. In the 1993–94 season, Metalist placed last and was relegated, spending the next 4 seasons in the second tier.

It was expected that the Kharkiv club would return to the top tier immediately; however, Metalist finished the 1994–95 Ukrainian First League season in the middle of the table. In 1995, Metalist Kharkiv, which was owned by the Malyshev Factory, was privatized. Remembering how Metalist got privatized, in the interview to ForUm in 2007, Droznyk said the following: "After working on this for some time, all of us—the factory, as well as the city and regional authorities—concluded that the club’s continued existence under state ownership jeopardized its operations. In 1995, a joint-stock company, "Football Club Metalist," was established. I became its principal shareholder," said Droznyk. It was a closed joint-stock company. In March 1996, Droznyk was arrested and placed in a pre-trial detention center under the Kharkiv City Internal Affairs Directorate. He was charged under eight articles of the Criminal Code of Ukraine covering serious and especially serious crimes. After spending six months in a pre-trial detention center, on August 19, 1996, he was convicted by the Kharkiv District Court of the Kharkiv Oblast for the alleged illegal possession of weapons; he was sentenced to three years of imprisonment, with the execution of the sentence suspended for a period of two years, and was released from custody. Droznyk soon fled to the Russian Federation, being afraid of additional persecution.

=== Administrative crisis and arrival of Fomenko ===
Mykhailo Fomenko

In 1996, the vice-president, Valeriy Buhay, was appointed the club's director and the president of the joint-stock company. The appointment was supported by the head of the Kharkiv Oblast State Administration, Oleh Dyomin, and the deputy mayor of Kharkiv, Mykhaylo Pylypchuk. During the 1995–96 Ukrainian First League season, Metalist struggled and almost got relegated from the second tier, placing 19th among 22 participants. Following the change of ownership, the club's situation was stabilized, yet it still struggled, finishing the next 1996–97 Ukrainian First League season in the middle of the table. At the beginning of the 1996–97 season, the club hired Mykhailo Fomenko, who started to rebuild the football club. Already in the 1997–98 Ukrainian First League season, Metalist placed third and was promoted to the top tier. That season in the First League, the club finished 9 points behind the season's leader, SC Mykolaiv, but had fewer losses, and since the Dynamo Kyiv reserve team (Dynamo-2) could not get promoted, the promotion was passed on to Metalist. In its first season back, Metalist, led by Fomenko, finished 6th, just outside the European cups qualification zone. In 1999, the Kharkiv deputy mayor Volodymyr Babayev convinced Oleksandr Feldman, who was an influential local businessman, to help Metalist financially. The next season, the club finished near the top of the table again and four points away from the European cup qualifications. This time, they finished fifth, surpassing Metalurh Zaporizhzhia, which tied with them on points, by the tie-breaking criteria. Following the season, Mykhailo Fomenko left for CSKA Kyiv.

For the 2000–01 Vyshcha Liha (top tier) season, Metalist secured the services of Leonid Tkachenko as the head coach, who had previously coached Metalist in the early 1990s. The club, however, did not perform well, and at the end of the first half of the season, Tkachenko resigned, leaving Ukraine for good. Under the Tkachenko's helm, Metalist lost their game against Shakhtar Donetsk 0:8. Following the winter break, the club was headed by Vitaliy Shalychev. The club's new president, Oleksandr Feldman, announced that the club's administration is struggling financially and had been restructured as an open joint-stock company, being interested for more investors. Metalist finished the season ninth, below what the club's administration had hoped.

A notable finish came during the 2001–02 season, when the club finished with 40 points, on a par with Metalurh Zaporizhzhya and Dnipro Dnipropetrovsk for a three-way tie. Metalist, led by the returned Mykhaylo Fomenko, was expected to take fourth place (and subsequently compete in the UEFA Cup) by virtue of having the best three-way, head-to-head record among the three teams (which is the official tie-breaker to be used in domestic competitions). Still, following a protest by Metalurh Zaporizhzhya and an arbitrary decision by the FFU Executive Committee, Metalurh Zaporizhzhya was awarded fourth place because it had better head-to-head records independently against either side. Fomenko, in turn, announced that he is resigning from the club for not getting paid. However, despite the announcement and the fact that the contract he signed had expired after a year, Fomenko stayed at Metalist and resigned only in November 2002 due to health concerns. He was replaced by Valentyn Kryachko. In 2015, already as a coach of the Ukraine national football team, in an interview with the Ukrainian internet media UA-Football, Fomenko disclosed his opinion regarding the FFU's decision about the 2001–02 season qualification for the continental competitions. He stated the following: "It’s no secret that the regulations were manipulated. But beyond that, I now realize that the club’s leadership at the time was actually afraid of qualifying for European competitions—they understood that it would require investing more money into the team. The stadium also needed renovations."

Following unsuccessful protests from Metalist, a disheartened management, team, and fan base would see the club finish bottom in the following season and earn a demotion to the Ukrainian First League. Due to poor performance by Metalist during the 2002–03 Vyshcha Liha season, in late spring 2003 Valentyn Kryachko was let go, and Fomenko was placed in charge as an acting head coach, but it did not save the situation. Following the season, Fomenko left the club for Metalurh Zaporizhzhia.

=== The Yaroslavskiy's Metalist and the European competitions ===
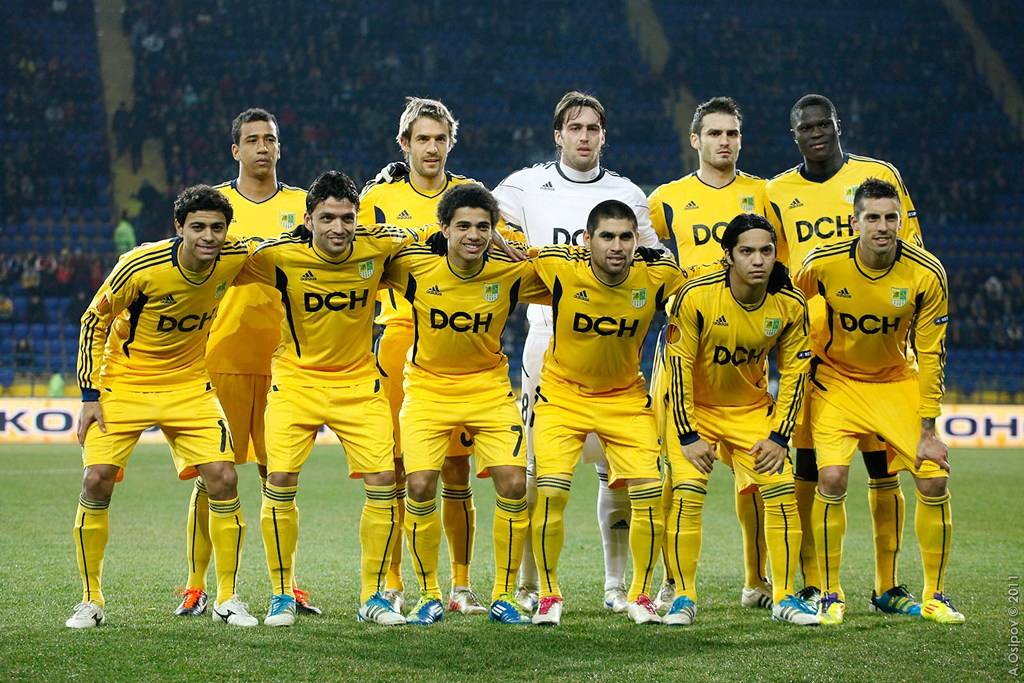
Metalist squad in UEFA Cup.

The 2003–04 season Metalist started in the First League (2nd tier). Before the start, on the initiative of the Metalist vice-president Vitaliy Danilov, the club secured the services of the former Soviet-Ukrainian football star Hennadiy Lytovchenko, who was excited to manage the Kharkiv club. Also during the season, Oleksandr Feldman was able to intice an interest in Metalist in another local businessman Oleksandr Yaroslavskyi who was a leader of the Ukrainian-Siberian Corporation and associated with the UkrSibbank. During the mid-season, Feldman has officially trasnferred ownership to Yaroslavskyi-Danilov, stating that both of them will determine who would be the president and the honorary president. The change of leadership brought several new changes to the club. FC Metalist adopted the local female football team, Kharkiv-Kondytsioner, which recently won the 2003 Ukrainian Women's League and in 2004 became the new Metalist female team. In addition to that the Professional Football League Higher League (Vyshcha Liha) was planning to start the new competitions for the Higher League's reserves, so, Metalist was making some changes within its administration, including coaching to create the new Metalist reserve team. Around that time, Danilov made friends with another important local politician, Hennadiy Kernes, but soon had a conflict with him. Metalist Kharkiv finished the season in second place, four points behind the leader Zakarpattia Uzhhorod, and were promoted.

The 2004–05 season, Metalist started in the PFL Higher League (Vyshcha Liha, top tier) and by the end of the first half was placing 7th. Around that time, a conflict grew between Vitaliy Danilov and Oleksandr Yaroslavskyi, after which Danilov left the club along with the head coach Lytovchenko and several leading footballers. All of them moved to Arsenal Kharkiv, which at that time was also planning to get promoted to the Higher League. The move was temporary, and it was planned that instead of Arsenal, a new club, FC Kharkiv, would be promoted to the Higher League. Despite few notable games, such as an away win over Shakhtar Donetsk, the conflict spoiled the season for Metalist, which finished in 11th place.

The club fully recovered during the next 2004–05 season, ending in 5th and were only a few points short of qualifying for the European competitions. Before the season, Metalist hired a Ukrainian coaching legend Myron Markevych, who eventually shaped Metalist into contenders for higher-level competitions.

In the 2006–07 season, Metalist finished third place in the league, qualifying for the 2007–08 UEFA Cup, their second appearance in a UEFA competition. They were drawn against English club Everton. The first leg, away at Goodison Park, ended in a 1–1 draw, while Everton won the second leg 3–2, eliminating Metalist.

Metalist's next European competition was the 2008–09 UEFA Cup. The club beat Beşiktaş 4–2 on aggregate in the first round to qualify for the group stage, where they were grouped with Galatasaray, Olympiacos, Hertha BSC and Benfica. Metalist finished top of the group, beating Galatasaray, Olympiacos and Benfica, whilst drawing 0–0 with Hertha. In the round of 32, Metalist defeated Italian club Sampdoria 3–0 on aggregate, setting up an all-Ukrainian round of 16 tie against Dynamo Kyiv. After losing in Kyiv 1–0, Metalist won the return leg 3–2, but were eliminated on the away goals rule.

When the competition was rebranded as the Europa League for the 2009–10 season, Metalist beat Croatian side HNK Rijeka 4–1 on aggregate in the third qualifying round before losing 2–1 on aggregate to Austrian side Sturm Graz, despite holding them 1–1 in Graz. The following season, they finished second in Group I behind Dutch giants PSV Eindhoven, thus qualifying for the round of 32 where they were thrashed 6–0 on aggregate by Bayer Leverkusen. They reached the quarter-finals the following season, beating Olympiacos on away goals in the round of 16, but falling to Sporting CP. The following season, they then faced Bayer Leverkusen again—after beating Leverkusen 2–0 on 22 November 2012, Metalist finished above the side on head-to-head points (13), as they both finished on 13 points and had played out a goalless draw at the BayArena. In the round of 32, Metalist then faced English club Newcastle United. After holding them to a goalless draw at St James' Park in the first leg on 14 February, Shola Ameobi scored a penalty, sending Newcastle through 1–0 on aggregate.

In August 2013, UEFA disqualified Metalist from all 2013–14 UEFA competitions. (Note: On 14 August 2013 UEFA announced that Metalist was banned from the 2013–14 UEFA Champions League due to an ongoing match fixing investigation related to match fixing arising from a game played against FC Karpaty Lviv in April 2008. The club appealed the decision at the Court of Arbitration for Sport (CAS), but it rejected Metalist's request, disqualifying the club from European 2013–14 competitions on 16 August 2013. The club was on the verge of competing in the qualifying phase of the tournament at the time of the decision. The CAS announced its final decision on Metalist's complaint on 28 August 2013 (thus one day after the club's final match in the qualifying phase of the tournament would have taken place); it upheld UEFA's decision to disqualify Metalist from European competitions.)

=== Stoppage in 2016 and the new club ===
Yaroslavsky sold the club to new owner Serhiy Kurchenko late in December 2012. Kurchenko left Ukraine in February 2014 following the 2014 Ukrainian revolution and his current whereabouts are unknown. It is believed that Serhiy Kurchenko bought the club from Yaroslavskyi at the end of 2012 for $100 million, supposedly. According to Kurchenko, he invested into the club around $270 million, but ran out of Ukraine in 2014. Since then, financing of the club was stopped.

On 22 April 2016, the FFU Committee announced that Metalist would not be allowed to participate in professional competitions because of its debts to its players. On 16 May 2016, the FFU Appeal Committee left in force the decision of the FFU Football Clubs Attestation Committee of 22 April 2016 and refused in issuing attestation for the next season for the club by declining its appeals. Metalist owed in salary to its players 32 million Euros with 5 million to Cleiton Xavier in particular. In June 2016 Nashi Groshi were informing that National Police of Ukraine opened criminal proceedings and asked the court on access to the Metalist salaries data. According to the Kominternivskyi District Court of Kharkiv, Metalist debt to its players and personnel exceeds over ₴30 million.

In July 2016, a team named SK Metalist Kharkiv started playing in the Kharkiv Oblast Championship. "SK Metalist Kharkiv" is owned by the same man under whose watch Metalist Kharkiv was expelled from the professional leagues: Serhiy Kurchenko. In 2016 Kharkiv Oblast Championship, the club competed under the name UPhC Olimpik – SC Metalist and placed the last place. UPhC Olimpik is a team of the Kharkiv State College of Physical Culture 1.

In August 2016, a new club called FC Metalist 1925 Kharkiv applied for the 2016–17 Ukrainian Football Amateur League, where it was headed by Oleksandr Pryzetko. The owner of FC Metalist 1925 Kharkiv is the company TOV Avanhard Kharkiv, later renamed to FC Metalist 1925 Kharkiv. TOV Avanhard Kharkiv is controlled by businessman and Kharkiv City Council deputy for Petro Poroshenko Bloc "Solidarity" Oleksandr Davtyan and his family. The club has planned to play in the professional Ukrainian Second League as soon as possible.

Since March 2017, FC Metalist 1925 Kharkiv plays its home matches at the Metalist Stadium; where Metalist Kharkiv used to play its home games.

On 28 April 2017 the FFU Control and Disciplinary Committee (CDC) implemented sanctions against 14 players of the FC Metalist Kharkiv on petition of the FFU Committee on ethics and fair play. Most players were restricted from conducting any activity related to football between six months to a year. Sanctions of three out of those 14 players exceeded that period up to three years and included such players as Yevhen Malyk (2yrs), Dmytro Skarzhynskyi (3yrs), and Oleksandr Medvedev (3yrs).

(The original) Metalist Kharkiv was in October 2017 confiscated by a Ukrainian court from Kurchenko and placed under state property. At the time the club did not participate in any official sanctioned competitions. In August 2017, all assets of the late Metalist including its non-material assets and corporate rights of PAT "FC Metalist", TOV "Metalist Holding", and TOV "Metalist-Arena" were transferred to the state property when to the assets of Viktor Yanukovych associates on petition of the Prosecutor General was implemented the procedure of special confiscation. The approximate value of the assets accounted for about $220 million, $65 million of which is the actual property of FC Metalist. Decision about the confiscation was adopted by the Sosnivskyi District Court of Cherkasy, while its public promotion was carried out by Prosecutor General Yuriy Lutsenko.

On 22 December 2017 it became known that among creditors who filed claims against the club are Kharkivoblenerho, Kharkivgaszbut, town of Vysochansk, Metalist Stadium, Cyprus off-shore company Hensley Capital Limited (a founding company of the club), State Fiscal Service in Kharkiv Oblast. In addition, the club indebted about ₴846 million to its former playing and non-playing staff.

For undetermined reason the Metalist property was never transferred to the Assets Recovery and Management Agency (ARMA) which is a state agency in management of recovered property. Instead, on 11 April 2018 the Cabinet of Ukraine ordered the property to be transferred under administration of the Kharkiv Oblast State Administration (see Governor of Kharkiv Oblast).

=== Metal Kharkiv and club reformation ===
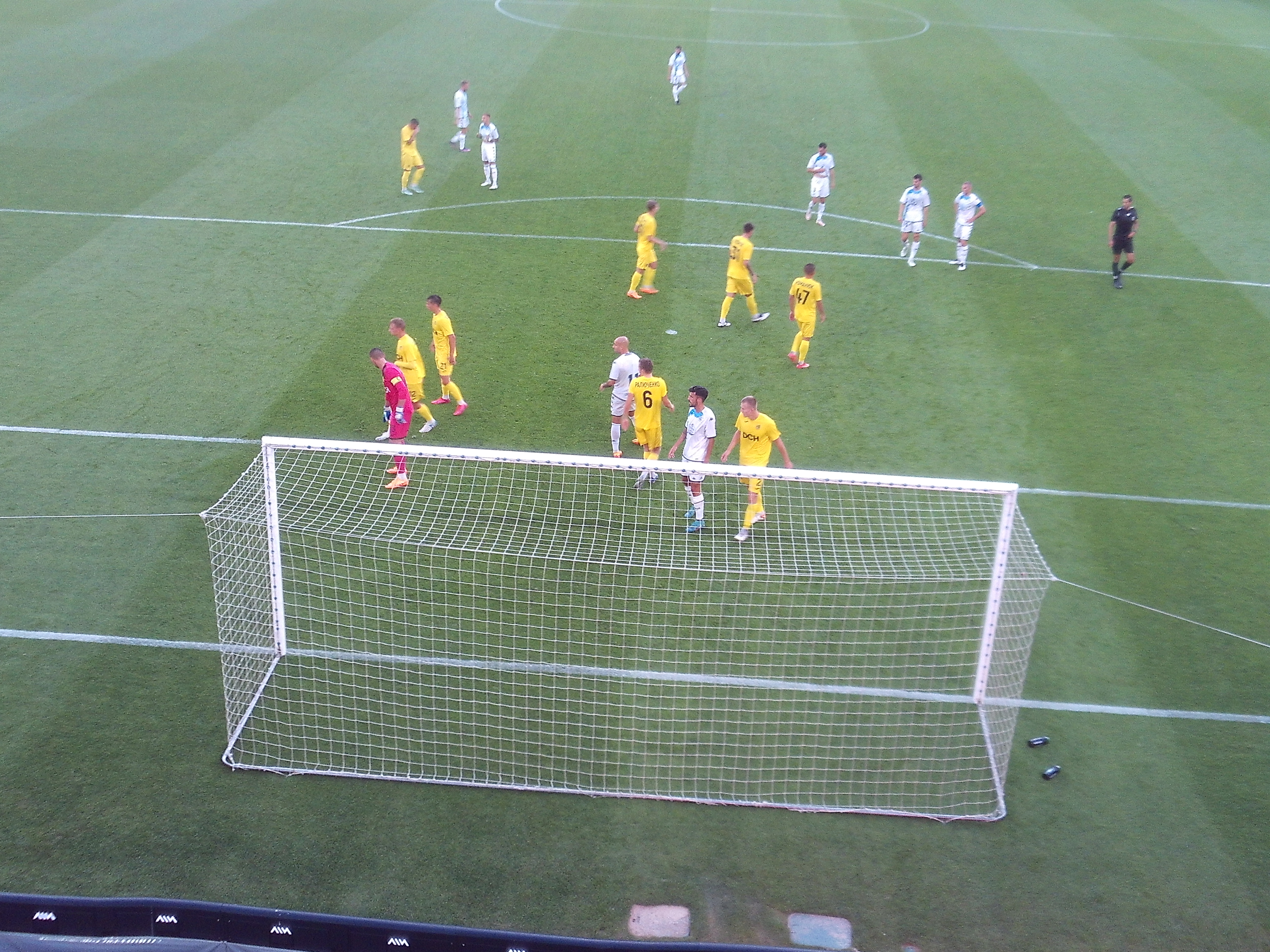
Deportivo de La Coruña vs. Metalist.

A new team based in Kharkiv and named Metal was founded in 2019 by former vice-president of Dynamo Kyiv and former sportive director of Metalist Yevhen Krasnikov. Metal debuted in the Ukrainian Second League in the 2020–21 season. Along with Oleksandr Kucher as the head coach, Metal was joined by former head coach of Metalist 1925 Kharkiv Oleksandr Pryzetko. After winning the Second League in June 2021, Metal was renamed Metalist, and the old logo returned to the club, along with its brand and history. Oleksandr Yaroslavsky, who was in charge of the old club from 2005 to 2012, became the president of the new club.

On 18 October 2023, a former player of Metalist David Caiado filed a new case with CAS against the revived club to recover his salary compensation (CAS 2022/A/9288). David Caiado played for Metalist in 2015. The club has appealed denying its relationship to the original club in hope to avoid paying owed compensations. Metalist has been playing in the Ukrainian First League since the 2023–24 season. Due to the Russian invasion of Ukraine (2022) Metalist has been playing its home matches since the 2023–24 season in Uzhhorod.

== Stadium ==
As Metalist Stadium was one of the venues for UEFA Euro 2012, the management decided to reconstruct and expand the arena and turn it into a modern recreational and leisure facility. In May 2008, Metalist Arena was the venue for 2008 Ukrainian Cup Final.

== Presidents ==
- 1992–1994 Dmitriy Droznik
- 1996–2001 Valeriy Buhay
- 2001–2004 Oleksandr Feldman
- 2005–2012 Oleksandr Yaroslavsky
- 2012–2017 Serhiy Kurchenko
  - 2017–2019 club was liquidated and revived based on Metal Kharkiv (2019–2021 Yevhen Krasnikov)
- 2021–2025 Oleksandr Yaroslavskyi
- 2025– Yevhen Krasnikov

== Honours ==
=== League ===
- Ukrainian Premier League
  - Runners-up: 2012–13
  - Third place (6): 2006–07, ~~2007–08~~ (stripped), 2008–09, 2009–10, 2010–11, 2011–12, 2013–14
- Soviet First League
  - Winners: 1981
- Ukrainian First League
  - Runners-up: 2003–04
- Ukrainian Second League (as FC Metal Kharkiv)
  - Winners: 2020–21
- Championship of the Ukrainian SSR
  - Winners: 1978

=== Cups ===
- Soviet Cup
  - Winners: 1987–88
  - Runners-up: 1983
- Ukrainian Cup
  - Runners-up: 1992
- USSR Federation Cup
  - Runners-up: 1987
- Soviet Super Cup
  - Runners-up: 1989

=== Invitational ===
- (India) DCM Trophy
  - Winners (1): 1986

== Football kits and sponsors ==
Years	Football kit	Shirt sponsor
1997–00		АВЭК/Tobacco Factory
2000–01	Puma	АВЭК/Tobacco Factory
2001–02	Puma/Adidas	–
2002–03	Lotto	TECHNOCOM
2002–03	adidas	АВЭК
2004–06	adidas	UKRSIBBANK
2006–08	adidas	UKRSIBBANK; BNP Paribas Group
2007–08	adidas	UKRSIBBANK/DCH
2008–12	adidas	DCH
2012–13	adidas	DCH/ВЕТЭК
2013–2016	adidas	ВЕТЭК
2020–2021	Joma	–
2021–2024	Joma	DCH
2024–2025	Joma	–

== Rivalry ==
Metalist Kharkiv supporters biggest rivalry centred on Dnipro Dnipropetrovsk. Despite this fans of both clubs marched in support of a united Ukraine in Kharkiv during the 2014 pro-Russian unrest in Ukraine.

A group of Metalist Kharkiv Ultras named "Sect 82" had a violent rivalry with Dynamo Kyiv. "Sect 82" was (at least until September 2013) allied with FC Spartak Moscow Ultras. (In 2014 "Sect 82" morphed into the Azov Battalion of the National Guard of Ukraine.)

== Current squad ==
As of 10 September 2026

Note: Flags indicate national team as defined under FIFA eligibility rules; some limited exceptions apply. Players may hold more than one non-FIFA nationality.

No.	Pos.	Nation	Player
2	DF	UKR	Oleksandr Myzyuk
6	FW	UKR	Daniil Teplyakov
7	MF	UKR	Petro Lutsiv
8	FW	UKR	Kyrylo Dihtyar
9	FW	UKR	Vasyl Lutsiv
10	MF	UKR	Maksym Bahachanskyi
11	MF	UKR	Oleksandr Tsvirenko
14	DF	UKR	Kyrylo Vlaha
17	DF	UKR	Daniil Prykhodko
19	FW	UKR	Danylo Kaydalov
20	DF	UKR	Daniel Vernattus
21	DF	UKR	Anton Zhdankov
22	MF	UKR	Denys Pidruchnyi
27	FW	UKR	Yevhen Isayenko

No.	Pos.	Nation	Player
29	MF	UKR	Yehor Abramov
30	MF	UKR	Ivan Shapovalov
31	DF	UKR	Bohdan Porokh
32	DF	UKR	Mykyta Shakhmayev
33	DF	UKR	Yehor Sherstyuk
35	GK	UKR	Pavlo Pletnyov
37	FW	UKR	Yehor Krasnikov
39	FW	UKR	Ilya Gryshchenko
43	GK	UKR	Heorhiy Polyakov
45	MF	UKR	Kyrylo Palyanychka
46	FW	UKR	Matviy Kolotay
47	DF	UKR	Roman Andreev
48	MF	UKR	Danil Prymak
98	MF	UKR	Maksym Orikhovskyi

=== Other player under contract ===
Note: Flags indicate national team as defined under FIFA eligibility rules; some limited exceptions apply. Players may hold more than one non-FIFA nationality.

No.	Pos.	Nation	Player

=== Out on loan ===
Note: Flags indicate national team as defined under FIFA eligibility rules; some limited exceptions apply. Players may hold more than one non-FIFA nationality.

No. / Pos. / Nation / Player	No. / Pos. / Nation / Player

== Personnel ==
=== Coaching staff ===
Position	Staff
Head coach	(Ukraine) Andriy Anishchenko
Assistant coach	(Ukraine) Vadym Kharchenko
Assistant coach	(Ukraine) Ivan Panchyshyn
Fitness coach	(Ukraine) Ruslan Fomin
Goalkeeping coach	(Ukraine) Oleksandr Horyainov

Last updated: 14 September 2023
Source: FC Metalist Kharkiv

=== Administration ===
Position	Staff
President	(Ukraine) Yevhen Krasnikov
Vice-President	(Senegal) Papa Gueye
Team chief	(Ukraine) Yevhen Pokatylov
Administrator	(Ukraine) Oleh Serchenko
Administrator	(Ukraine) Vladyslav Varyukhin

Last updated: 18 August 2025
Source: FC Metalist Kharkiv

== Player records ==
=== Top goalscorers ===
As of 6 December 2016

#	Name	Years	League	Cup	Europe	Other	Total
1	(Serbia) (Ukraine) Marko Dević	2006–12; 2013–14	84	4	10	0	98
2	(Soviet Union) Nikolai Korolyov	1956–66	70	3	8	0	86
3	(Ukraine) Volodymyr Linke	1976–85; 1994–96	77	4	0	0	81
4	(Ukraine) Yuri Tarasov	1983–91; 1993–94	61	11	2	0	74
5	(Soviet Union) Nodar Bachiashvili	1978–82	67	1	0	0	68
6	(Brazil) Cleiton Xavier	2010–14	46	2	11	0	59
7	(Soviet Union) Yuri Tsymbalyuk	1973–77; 1981	52	4	0	0	56
8	(Ukraine) Oleksandr Karabuta	1991–00	46	5	0	0	51
9	(Brazil) Jajá Coelho	2008–10; 2013-14	35	3	4	0	42
10	(Soviet Union) Stanislav Bernikov	1977–83	37	4	0	0	41

- Other – National Super Cup

=== Most appearances ===
As of 10 November 2021

#	Name	Years	League	Cup	Europe	Other	Total
1	(Ukraine) Oleksandr Horyainov	1993–95; 1997–03; 2005–2016	427	34	41	0	502
2	(Ukraine) Volodymyr Linke	1976–85; 1994–96	351	25	0	0	376
3	(Soviet Union) Nikolai Korolyov	1956–66; 1969	353	8	0	0	361
4	(Ukraine) Ivan Panchyshyn	1985–90; 1992–94; 1996–98	282	35	4	0	321
5	(Soviet Union) Evgeniy Panfilov	1958–69	312	8	0	0	320
6	(Soviet Union) Yuriy Syvukha	1976; 1979–88	268	38	2	0	308
7	(Senegal) Papa Gueye	2006–15	211	16	54	0	281
8	(Soviet Union) Aleksandr Savchenko	1965–73	260	15	0	0	275
9	(Soviet Union) Viktor Aristov	1967–73	254	16	0	0	270
10	(Soviet Union) Alexander Kosolapov	1974–78; 1980–83	249	17	0	0	266

- Other – National Super Cup

== League and Cup history ==
=== Soviet Union ===
Season	Div.	Pos.	Pl.	W	D	L	GS	GA	P	Soviet Cup	Ukrainian Cup	Notes
KhPZ
1926-1935	unknown											
1936	unknown									1/32 finals		
1937	unknown										1/16 finals	
1938	unknown									1/64 finals		
1939	unknown										1/16 finals	
1940-1945	World War II											
Dzerzhynets / Dzerzhinets
1946	3rd (Tretia Gruppa)	1	18	13	1	4	56	21	27		1/4 finals	
1946	3rd (Tretia Gruppa)	3	3	0	1	2	3	10	1		1/4 finals	Promoted
1947	2nd (Vtoraya Gruppa)	9	24	9	3	12	43	47	21	1/128 finals	1/4 finals	
1948	2nd (Vtoraya Gruppa)	7	14	4	1	9	16	37	9			
1949	2nd (Vtoraya Gruppa)	6	34	16	7	11	50	41	39	1/256 finals		Withdrew; Reorganization
1950	club idle											
1951	4th (Ukrainian Championship)	8	18	4	3	11	17	28	11		1/16 finals	
1952	4th (Ukrainian Championship)	10	22	5	4	13	23	32	14			Withdrew
1953	unknown										1/8 finals	

Season	Div.	Pos.	Pl.	W	D	L	GS	GA	P	Domestic Cup	Europe		Notes
FC Lokomotyv Kharkiv was withdrawn and replaced with Avanhard Kharkiv
Avanhard / Avangard
1956	2nd (Klass B)	10	34	14	7	13	40	44	35				
1957	2nd (Klass B)	3	34	18	5	11	65	41	41	1/64 final			
1958	2nd (Klass B)	11	30	10	8	12	39	35	28	1/256 final			
1959	2nd (Klass B)	3	28	13	11	4	40	26	37	1/16 final			Promoted
1960	1st (Klass A)	9	20	4	6	10	17	30	14	1/16 final			
1960	1st (Klass A)	13	10	4	4	2	11	5	12	1/16 final			13-18 places group
1961	1st (Klass A)	3	20	10	6	4	22	15	26	1/16 final			
1961	1st (Klass A)	6	10	2	4	4	8	10	8	1/16 final			1-10 places group
1962	1st (Klass A)	7	20	7	3	10	16	26	17	1/8 final			
1962	1st (Klass A)	14	10	4	4	2	15	9	12	1/8 final			13-22 places group
1963	1st (Klass A. Pervaya gruppa)	19	38	6	13	19	25	56	25	1/16 final			Relegated
1964	2nd (Klass A. Vtoraya gruppa)	1	24	12	6	6	30	17	30	1/32 final			
1964	2nd (Klass A. Vtoraya gruppa)	6	14	4	6	4	15	14	14	1/32 final			1-14 places group
1965	2nd (Klass A. Vtoraya gruppa)	3	30	14	8	8	37	27	36	1/64 final			
1965	2nd (Klass A. Vtoraya gruppa)	3	16	8	2	6	19	20	18	1/64 final			1-16 places group
1966	2nd (Klass A. Vtoraya gruppa)	10	34	6	20	8	22	23	32	1/128 final			
Metalist / Metallist
1967	2nd (Klass A. Vtoraya gruppa)	9	38	16	8	14	35	30	40	1/64 final			
1968	2nd (Klass A. Vtoraya gruppa)	2	40	21	13	6	45	18	55	1/32 final			
1969	2nd (Klass A. Vtoraya gruppa)	3	42	19	14	9	40	27	52	1/128 final			
1970	2nd (Klass A. Pervaya gruppa)	5	42	15	19	8	43	26	49	1/16 final			
1971	2nd (Pervaya Liga)	8	42	18	7	17	50	49	43	1/16 final			
1972	2nd (Pervaya Liga)	16	38	10	12	16	33	42	32	1/16 final	CoU	1/8 finals	
1973	2nd (Pervaya Liga)	19	38	11	5	22	34	50	27	1/16 final	CoU	1/8 finals	Relegated
1974	3rd (Vtoraya Liga)	2	38	15	15	8	63	42	45		CoU	1/16 finals	Ukrainian Championship
1974	3rd (Vtoraya Liga)	1	5	3	1	1	6	2	7		CoU	1/16 finals	Semifinal group
1974	3rd (Vtoraya Liga)	3	5	2	2	1	7	5	6		CoU	1/16 finals	Final group; Promoted
1975	2nd (Pervaya Liga)	19	38	10	11	17	30	49	31	1/16 final	CoU	1/4 finals	Relegated
1976	3rd (Vtoraya Liga)	2	38	19	8	11	51	29	46		CoU	1/2 finals	Ukrainian Championship
1977	3rd (Vtoraya Liga)	4	44	22	16	6	59	24	60	1/16 final			Ukrainian Championship
1978	3rd (Vtoraya Liga)	1	44	29	12	3	66	20	70				Champions of Ukraine
1978	3rd (Vtoraya Liga)	1	2	1	0	1	1	1	2				Promotion playoff won
1979	2nd (Pervaya Liga)	7	46	19	10	17	43	47	48	1/8			
1980	2nd (Pervaya Liga)	3	46	24	12	10	76	40	60	1/16			
1981	2nd (Pervaya Liga)	1	46	25	12	9	68	33	62	1/2			Promoted
1982	1st (Vysshaya Liga)	12	34	10	11	13	32	34	30	Group stage			
1983	1st (Vysshaya Liga)	11	34	12	8	14	38	40	32	Finalist			
1984	1st (Vysshaya Liga)	12	34	12	5	17	42	53	29	1/8			
1985	1st (Vysshaya Liga)	10	34	12	7	15	39	55	31	1/16			
1986	1st (Vysshaya Liga)	12	30	9	9	12	21	25	27	1/16			
1987	1st (Vysshaya Liga)	11	30	10	7	13	23	32	27	1/4			
1988	1st (Vysshaya Liga)	11	30	8	10	12	29	36	26	Winner	CW	2nd round	First international participation
1989	1st (Vysshaya Liga)	7	30	10	10	10	30	33	30	1/8			
1990	1st (Vysshaya Liga)	11	24	5	8	11	13	28	18	1/4			
1991	1st (Vysshaya Liga)	15	30	8	9	13	32	43	25	1/16			Joined Vyshcha Liha
1992	no league competition									1/4			withdrew from the Soviet Cup

=== Ukraine ===
Season	Div.	Pos.	Pl.	W	D	L	GS	GA	P	Domestic Cup	Europe		Notes
1992	1st (Vyshcha Liha)	6_{/20}	18	8	5	5	21	16	21	Runner-up			
1992–93	1st (Vyshcha Liha)	5_{/16}	30	12	7	11	37	34	31	1/2 finals			
1993–94	1st (Vyshcha Liha)	18_{/18}	34	6	8	20	22	63	20	1/16 finals			Relegated
1994–95	2nd (Persha Liha)	10_{/22}	42	17	9	16	48	44	60	Second round			
1995–96	2nd (Persha Liha)	19_{/22}	42	10	9	23	40	54	39	1/32 finals			
1996–97	2nd (Persha Liha)	12_{/24}	46	18	9	19	55	53	63	Second round			
1997–98	2nd (Persha Liha)	3_{/22}	42	26	11	5	74	29	89	1/16 finals			Promoted
1998–99	1st (Vyshcha Liha)	6_{/16}	30	14	5	11	31	32	47	1/4 finals			
1999–00	1st (Vyshcha Liha)	5_{/16}	30	12	8	10	41	35	44	1/16 finals			
2000–01	1st (Vyshcha Liha)	9_{/14}	26	8	7	11	27	37	31	1/8 finals			
2001–02	1st (Vyshcha Liha)	5_{/14}	26	11	7	8	35	36	40	1/4 finals			
2002–03	1st (Vyshcha Liha)	16_{/16}	30	6	5	19	19	43	23	1/16 finals			Relegated
2003–04	2nd (Persha Liha)	2_{/18}	34	19	9	6	51	24	66	1/16 finals			Promoted
2004–05	1st (Vyshcha Liha)	11_{/16}	30	9	7	14	25	37	34	1/16 finals			
2005–06	1st (Vyshcha Liha)	5_{/16}	30	12	7	11	35	42	43	1/8 finals			
2006–07	1st (Vyshcha Liha)	3_{/16}	30	18	7	5	40	20	61	1/2 finals			
2007–08	1st (Vyshcha Liha)	3_{/16}	30	19	6	5	50	27	63	1/8 finals	UC	1st round	Bronze stripped
2008–09	1st (Premier Liha)	3_{/16}	30	17	8	5	44	25	59	1/2 finals	UC	Round of 16	
2009–10	1st (Premier Liha)	3_{/16}	30	19	5	6	49	23	62	1/8 finals	EL	Play-off round	
2010–11	1st (Premier Liha)	3_{/16}	30	18	6	6	58	26	60	1/16 finals	EL	Round of 32	
2011–12	1st (Premier Liha)	3_{/16}	30	16	11	3	54	32	59	1/8 finals	EL	1/4 finals	
2012–13	1st (Premier Liha)	2_{/16}	30	20	6	4	59	25	66	1/8 finals	EL	Round of 32	
2013–14	1st (Premier Liha)	3_{/16}	28	16	9	3	54	29	57	1/4 finals	UCL	3rd qual. round	
2014–15	1st (Premier Liha)	6_{/14}	25	8	11	6	34	32	35	1/4 finals	EL	Group stage	
2015–16	1st (Premier Liha)	10_{/14}	26	5	9	12	19	46	24	1/16 finals			Expelled
FC Metal Kharkiv
2020–21	3rd (Druha Liha)	1_{/12}	22	20	2	0	65	5	62	1/64 finals			Promoted
FC Metalist Kharkiv (Note: The club was renamed from FC Metal Kharkiv to FC Metalist Kharkiv)
2021–22	2nd (Persha Liha)	1_{/16}	20	17	2	1	52	9	53	1/8 finals (Canceled)			Promoted
2022–23	1st (Premier Liha)	15_{/16}	30	5	7	18	27	58	22	None			Relegated
2023–24	2nd(Persha Liha "A")	9_{/10}	18	3	5	10	13	27	14				Admitted to Relegation Group
2023–24	2nd(Persha Liha "REL")	14_{/10}	28	7	9	12	27	34	30				-
2024–25	2nd(Persha Liha "A")	3/8	14	6	4	4	20	11	22	Third round	-	-	Admitted to Promotion Group
2024–25	2nd(Persha Liha "PRO")	6/8	22	8	7	7	29	21	31	Third round	-	-	-
2025–26	2nd(Persha Liha)	6/16	29	10	7	12	31	34	37	1/32 finals	-	-	-
2026–27	2nd(Persha Liha)	6/16	6	3	1	2	9	7	10	1/4 finals	-	-	TBD

== Metalist in Europe ==
=== UEFA Team ranking ===
Rank	Country	Team	Points
95	(Belgium)	Standard Liège	20.980
96	(Germany)	SC Freiburg	20.899
97	(Russia)	Lokomotiv Moscow	20.606
98	(Ukraine)	Metalist Kharkiv	20.526
99	(France)	Guingamp	20.333
100	(Norway)	Molde	20.165
101	(England)	Wigan Athletic	19.192

Last update: May 5, 2017

=== European history ===
Metalist Kharkiv participates in European competitions since 1988, when they played their first game against Borac Banja Luka. From 2007 to 2014, however, the club continuously participated on annual basis with variable successes. This ended when Metalist failed to qualify.

Best results:

Season	Achievement	Notes
UEFA Cup / Europa League
2011–12	Quarter-Finalist	eliminated by (Portugal) Sporting CP 1–2 in Lisbon, 1–1 in Kharkiv

Games of Metalist in UEFA competitions
Season	Competition	Round	Club	Home	Away	Aggregate
1988–89	Cup Winners' Cup	First round	(Socialist Federal Republic of Yugoslavia) Borac Banja Luka	4–0	0–2	4–2
1988–89	Cup Winners' Cup	Second round	(Netherlands) Roda JC	0–0	0–1	0–1
2007–08	UEFA Cup	First round	(England) Everton	2–3	1–1	3–4
2008–09	UEFA Cup	First round	(Turkey) Beşiktaş J.K.	4–1	0–1	4–2
2008–09	UEFA Cup	Group B	(Germany) Hertha BSC	0–0	—	1st
2008–09	UEFA Cup	Group B	(Turkey) Galatasaray	—	1–0	1st
2008–09	UEFA Cup	Group B	(Greece) Olympiacos	1–0	—	1st
2008–09	UEFA Cup	Group B	(Portugal) Benfica	—	1–0	1st
2008–09	UEFA Cup	Round of 32	(Italy) Sampdoria	2–0	1–0	3–0
2008–09	UEFA Cup	Round of 16	(Ukraine) Dynamo Kyiv	3–2	0–1	3–3 (a)
2009–10	UEFA Europa League	Third qualifying round	(Croatia) Rijeka	2–0	2–1	4–1
2009–10	UEFA Europa League	Play-off round	(Austria) Sturm Graz	0–1	1–1	1–2
2010–11	UEFA Europa League	Play-off round	(Cyprus) Omonia	2–2	1–0	3–2
2010–11	UEFA Europa League	Group I	(Netherlands) PSV Eindhoven	0–2	0–0	2nd
2010–11	UEFA Europa League	Group I	(Italy) Sampdoria	2–1	0–0	2nd
2010–11	UEFA Europa League	Group I	(Hungary) Debrecen	2–1	5–0	2nd
2010–11	UEFA Europa League	Round of 32	(Germany) Bayer Leverkusen	0–4	0–2	0–6
2011–12	UEFA Europa League	Play-off round	(France) Sochaux	0–0	4–0	4–0
2011–12	UEFA Europa League	Group G	(Netherlands) AZ	1–1	1–1	1st
2011–12	UEFA Europa League	Group G	Austria Wien	4–1	2–1	1st
2011–12	UEFA Europa League	Group G	(Sweden) Malmö FF	3–1	4–1	1st
2011–12	UEFA Europa League	Round of 32	(Austria) Red Bull Salzburg	4–0	4–1	8–1
2011–12	UEFA Europa League	Round of 16	(Greece) Olympiacos	0–1	2–1	2–2 (a)
2011–12	UEFA Europa League	Quarter-finals	(Portugal) Sporting CP	1–1	1–2	2–3
2012–13	UEFA Europa League	Play-off round	(Romania) Dinamo București	2–1	2–0	4–1
2012–13	UEFA Europa League	Group K	(Germany) Bayer Leverkusen	2–0	0–0	1st
2012–13	UEFA Europa League	Group K	(Norway) Rosenborg	3–1	2–1	1st
2012–13	UEFA Europa League	Group K	(Austria) Rapid Wien	2–0	0–1	1st
2012–13	UEFA Europa League	Round of 32	(England) Newcastle United	0–1	0–0	0–1
2013–14	UEFA Champions League	Third qualifying round	(Greece) PAOK	1–1	2–0	3–1
2013–14	UEFA Champions League	Play-off round	(Germany) Schalke 04	Disqualified due to match-fixing		
2014–15	UEFA Europa League	Play-off round	(Poland) Ruch Chorzów	0–0	1–0	1–0
2014–15	UEFA Europa League	Group L	(Poland) Legia Warsaw	0–1	1–2	4th
2014–15	UEFA Europa League	Group L	(Turkey) Trabzonspor	1–2	1–3	4th
2014–15	UEFA Europa League	Group L	(Belgium) Lokeren	0–1	0–1	4th

== Managers ==
- (Ukrainian Soviet Socialist Republic) Oleksandr Ponomarov (1960–61)
- (Soviet Union) Viktor Zhylin (1962–63)
- (Soviet Union) Yevgeni Yeliseyev (1965–66)
- (Ukrainian Soviet Socialist Republic) Viktor Kanevskyi (1968–71)
- (Soviet Union) Viktor Terentiev (1972)
- (Soviet Union) Yuriy Voynov (1972–73)
- (Soviet Union) Oleg Oshenkov (1975–76)
- (Ukrainian Soviet Socialist Republic) Yevhen Lemeshko (1977–88)
- (Soviet Union) Leonid Tkachenko (1984–??)
- (Ukraine) Oleksandr Dovbiy (1990–91)
- (Ukraine) Viktor Aristov (1993)
- (Ukraine) Oleksandr Dovbiy (1994)
- (Ukraine) Mykhaylo Fomenko (July 1996 – June 2000)
- (Russia) Leonid Tkachenko (2000)
- (Ukraine) Mykhaylo Fomenko (July 2001 – Nov 2002)
- (Ukraine) Hennadiy Lytovchenko (July 2003 – Dec 2004)
- (Ukraine) Oleksandr Zavarov (Jan 2005 – June 2005)
- (Ukraine) Myron Markevych (July 2005 – 24 Feb 2014)
- (Ukraine) Ihor Rakhayev (24 Feb 2014 – 4 June 2015)
- (Ukraine) Oleksandr Sevidov (4 June 2015 – 18 April 2016)
- (Ukraine) Oleksandr Pryzetko (interim) (18 April 2016 – May 2016)
- (Ukraine) Oleksandr Kucher (30 July 2020 – 13 July 2022 for Metal and Metalist)
- (Ukraine) Oleksandr Pryzetko (interim) (13 July 2022)
- (Ukraine) Oleh Ratiy (interim) (14 July 2022 – 27 January 2023)
- (Serbia) Perica Ognjenović (interim) (27 January 2023 – 8 June 2023)
- (Ukraine) Andriy Anishchenko (24 June 2023 – present)

== See also ==
- FC Kharkiv
- FC Metalist 1925 Kharkiv
- FC Lokomotyv Kharkiv
