= 1985 Soviet Cup final =

- Event: 1984-85 Soviet Cup
Dynamo Kyiv	Shakhtar Donetsk
2	1
- Date: 23 June 1985
- Venue: Tsentralny Stadion imeni Lenina, Moscow
- Referee: Valeriy Butenko (Moscow)
- Attendance: 53,200

The 1985 Soviet Cup final was a football match that took place at the Lenin's Central Stadium, Moscow on 23 June 1985. The match was the 44th Soviet Cup final and it was contested by Dynamo Kyiv and Shakhtar Donetsk – a rivalry known as the Klasychne derby.

Goals from Anatoliy Demyanenko and Oleh Blokhin helped Dynamo Kyiv defeat Shakhtar Donetsk 2–1 to win the competition for the seventh time. The match represented the fourth and final time which the final was contested by two teams from the Ukrainian Soviet Socialist Republic.

As winners of the competition, Dynamo Kyiv qualified to represent the Soviet Union in the 1985–86 European Cup Winners' Cup.

== Background ==
Dynamo Kyiv had reached the Soviet Cup final on seven previous occasions, winning the trophy six times (in 1954, 1964, 1966, 1974, 1978 and 1982). They were the most successful team from the Ukrainian Soviet Socialist Republic in the history of the competition.

Shakhter Donetsk had reached the Soviet Cup final on six previous occasions, winning the trophy four times (in 1961, 1962, 1980 and 1983).

The match represented the fourth time that two teams from the Ukrainian Soviet Socialist Republic contested the final. It was a replay of the 1978 final in which Dynamo Kyiv defeated Shakhtar Donetsk 2–1 after extra time. The other previous all-Ukrainian finals saw Dynamo Kyiv defeat Zaria Voroshilovgrad 3–0 after extra time in 1974 and Shakhter Donetsk defeated Metallist Kharkov in 1983.

== Road to Moscow ==
As both Dynamo Kyiv and Shakhtar Donetsk competed in the Soviet Top League, they entered the competition in the round of 32.

Note: In all results below, the score of the finalist is given first (H: home; A: away).

FC Dynamo Kyiv		Round	FC Shakhtar Donetsk	
Opponent	Result	1984–85 Soviet Cup	Opponent	Result
Nistru Kishinev (A)	4–2	First round	Kotaik Abovyan (A)	3–1
Dinamo Moscow (H)	1–1 (a.e.t.) (6–5 p)	Second round	Ararat Yerevan (H)	2–1
Kairat Alma-Ata (H)	2–1	Quarter-finals	FC Dnipro (H)	2–1
Iskra Smolensk (H)	3–0	Semi-finals	Zenit Leningrad (H)	0–0 (a.e.t.) (4–2 p)

== Match details ==
23 June 1985

FC Dynamo Kyiv	2–1	FC Shakhtar Donetsk
Demianenko 56'; Blokhin 58'		Morozov 68'

Tsentralny Stadion imeni Lenina, Moscow
Attendance: 53,200
Referee: Valeri Butenko (Moscow)

Dinamo Kyiv:
GK	(Ukrainian Soviet Socialist Republic) Mykhaylo Mykhaylov
(Ukrainian Soviet Socialist Republic) Volodymyr Bezsonov
(Ukrainian Soviet Socialist Republic) Serhiy Baltacha (c)
(Ukrainian Soviet Socialist Republic) Oleh Kuznetsov
(Ukrainian Soviet Socialist Republic) Anatoliy Demyanenko
(Ukrainian Soviet Socialist Republic) Vasyl Rats
(Ukrainian Soviet Socialist Republic) Pavlo Yakovenko	(substituted off) 88'
(Ukrainian Soviet Socialist Republic) Andriy Bal
(Ukrainian Soviet Socialist Republic) Oleksandr Zavarov	(substituted off) 88'
(Ukrainian Soviet Socialist Republic) Ihor Belanov	(substituted off) 55'
(Ukrainian Soviet Socialist Republic) Oleh Blokhin
Substitutes:
(Ukrainian Soviet Socialist Republic) Ivan Yaremchuk	(substituted on) 55'
(Ukrainian Soviet Socialist Republic) Vadym Yevtushenko	(substituted on) 88'
(Ukrainian Soviet Socialist Republic) Vasyl Yevseyev	(substituted on) 88'
Manager:
(Ukrainian Soviet Socialist Republic) Valeriy Lobanovskyi

Shakhter Donetsk:
GK	(Ukrainian Soviet Socialist Republic) Valentyn Yelinskas
(Ukrainian Soviet Socialist Republic) Oleksiy Varnavskyi
(Ukrainian Soviet Socialist Republic) Oleksandr Sopko
(Ukrainian Soviet Socialist Republic) Serhiy Pokydin
(Ukrainian Soviet Socialist Republic) Serhiy Zhuravlyov	(substituted off) 61'
(Ukrainian Soviet Socialist Republic) Valeriy Rudakov
(Ukrainian Soviet Socialist Republic) Serhiy Yashchenko
(Ukrainian Soviet Socialist Republic) Mykhaylo Sokolovskyi (c)	(substituted off) 58'
(Ukrainian Soviet Socialist Republic) Serhiy Akymenko
(Ukrainian Soviet Socialist Republic) Valeriy Hoshkoderya	(substituted off) 46'
(Ukrainian Soviet Socialist Republic) Viktor Hrachov
Substitutes:
(Ukrainian Soviet Socialist Republic) Serhiy Morozov	(substituted on) 61'
(Ukrainian Soviet Socialist Republic) Serhiy Kravchenko	(substituted on) 46'
(Ukrainian Soviet Socialist Republic) Ihor Petrov	(substituted on) 58'
Manager:
(Ukrainian Soviet Socialist Republic) Viktor Nosov

MATCH OFFICIALS

- Assistant referees:
  - Yu.Savchenko (Moscow)
  - A.Mushkovets (Moscow)
- Fourth official:( )

MATCH RULES

- 90 minutes.
- 30 minutes of extra-time if necessary.
- Penalty shoot-out if scores still level.
- Seven named substitutes
- Maximum of 3 substitutions.

== Aftermath ==
Following their cup win, Dynamo Kyiv represented the Soviet Union in the 1985–86 European Cup Winners' Cup. They would win the competition after defeating Atlético Madrid of Spain 3–0 in the final at the Stade de Gerland in Lyon, France.

== See also ==
- 1985 Soviet Top League
- 1985 Soviet First League
- 1985 Soviet Second League
