= 1983 Soviet Cup final =

- Event: 1983 Soviet Cup
Shakhter Donetsk	Metallist Kharkov
1	0
- Date: 8 May 1983
- Venue: Tsentralny Stadion imeni Lenina, Moscow
- Referee: Valeri Butenko (Moscow)
- Attendance: 30,000

The 1983 Soviet Cup final was a football match that took place at the Lenin's Central Stadium, Moscow on 8 May 1983. The match was the 42nd Soviet Cup final and it was contested by Shakhter Donetsk and Metallist Kharkov.

Serhiy Yashchenko scored the only goal of the match after 23 minutes as Shakhter Donetsk won the competition for the fourth time. It was the 11th time that a team from the Ukrainian Soviet Socialist Republic had won the cup and the ninth time in 11 seasons in which a team from outside the Russian Soviet Federative Socialist Republic won the competition.

As winners of the competition, Shakhtar Donetsk qualified to represent the Soviet Union in the 1983–84 European Cup Winners' Cup.

== Background ==
Shakhter Donetsk had reached the Soviet Cup final on five previous occasions, winning the trophy three times (in 1961, 1962 and 1980).

Metallist Kharkov had never previously reached the final of the competition.

The match represented the third time that two teams from the Ukrainian Soviet Socialist Republic contested the final. Both previous occasions were won by Dynamo Kyiv after extra time – 3–0 against Zaria Voroshilovgrad in 1974 and 2–1 against Shakhter Donetsk in 1978.

In the previous 10 seasons, Dynamo Kyiv (3), Ararat Yerevan (2), Dinamo Tbilisi (2) and Shakhtar Donetsk (1) had all won the cup from outside the Russian Soviet Federative Socialist Republic. Dynamo Moscow's triumph in 1977 and Rostov-on-Don's win in 1981 were the only wins by Russian sides in that time.

== Road to Moscow ==
As both Shakhter Donestsk and Metallist Kharkov competed in the Soviet Top League, they entered the competition in the round of 32.

Note: In all results below, the score of the finalist is given first (H: home; A: away).

Shakhter Donetsk		Round	Metallist Kharkov	
Opponent	Result	1984–85 Soviet Cup	Opponent	Result
Zalgiris Vilnius (H)	3–0	Round of 32	Kairat Alma-Ata (H)	0–0 (a.e.t.) (6–5 p)
Spartak Moscow (A)	3–2 (a.e.t.)	Round of 16	Ararat Yerevan (A)	4–2
Dinamo Moscow (N)	3–1 (a.e.t.)	Quarter-finals	Torpedo Kutaisi (H)	0–0 (a.e.t.) (4–3 p)
Zenit Leningrad (H)	1–1 (a.e.t.) (4–2 p)	Semi-finals	CSKA Moscow (A)	1–0 (a.e.t.)

== Match details ==
8 May 1983

Shakhter Donetsk	1–0	Metallist Kharkov
Yashchenko 23'

Tsentralny Stadion imeni Lenina, Moscow
Attendance: 30,000
Referee: Valeriy Butenko (Moscow)

Shakhter Donetsk:
GK	(Ukrainian Soviet Socialist Republic) Valentyn Ielinskas
(Ukrainian Soviet Socialist Republic) Oleksiy Varnavskyi
(Ukrainian Soviet Socialist Republic) Oleksandr Sopko
(Ukrainian Soviet Socialist Republic) Ihor Simonov
(Ukrainian Soviet Socialist Republic) Volodymyr Parkhomenko
(Ukrainian Soviet Socialist Republic) Valeriy Rudakov
(Ukrainian Soviet Socialist Republic) Serhiy Yashchenko	(substituted off) 74'
(Ukrainian Soviet Socialist Republic) Mykhailo Sokolovskyi (c)
(Ukrainian Soviet Socialist Republic) Serhiy Morozov	(substituted off) 63'
(Ukrainian Soviet Socialist Republic) Ihor Yurchenko	Yellow card
(Ukrainian Soviet Socialist Republic) Viktor Hrachov
Substitutes:
(Ukrainian Soviet Socialist Republic) Serhiy Akymenko	(substituted on) 63'
(Ukrainian Soviet Socialist Republic) Ihor Petrov	(substituted on) 74'
Manager:
(Ukrainian Soviet Socialist Republic) Viktor Nosov

Metallist Kharkov:
GK	(Ukrainian Soviet Socialist Republic) Yuriy Syvukha
(Ukrainian Soviet Socialist Republic) Viktor Kaplun
(Ukrainian Soviet Socialist Republic) Rostyslav Potochniak (c)
(Ukrainian Soviet Socialist Republic) Oleksandr Boiko	(substituted off) 46'
(Ukrainian Soviet Socialist Republic) Viktor Kamarzaev
(Ukrainian Soviet Socialist Republic) Serhiy Kuznetsov
(Russian Soviet Federative Socialist Republic) Leonid Tkachenko
(Ukrainian Soviet Socialist Republic) Viktor Suslo	(substituted off) 63'
(Ukrainian Soviet Socialist Republic) Volodymyr Linke
(Russian Soviet Federative Socialist Republic) Stanislav Bernikov	(substituted off) 41'
(Ukrainian Soviet Socialist Republic) Yuri Tarasov
Substitutes:
(Ukrainian Soviet Socialist Republic) Leonid Saakov	(substituted on) 41'
(Ukrainian Soviet Socialist Republic) Oleksandr Horbyk	(substituted on) 46'
(Ukrainian Soviet Socialist Republic) Serhiy Motuz	(substituted on) 63'
Manager:
(Ukrainian Soviet Socialist Republic) Yevhen Lemeshko

MATCH OFFICIALS

- Assistant referees:
  - Yu.Savchenko (Moscow)
  - K.Doronin (Moscow)
- Fourth official:( )

MATCH RULES

- 90 minutes.
- 30 minutes of extra-time if necessary.
- Penalty shoot-out if scores still level.
- Seven named substitutes
- Maximum of 3 substitutions.

== Aftermath ==
Following their cup win, Shakhtar Donetsk represented the Soviet Union in the 1983–84 European Cup Winners' Cup. They were eliminated in the quarter-finals after losing 4–3 on aggregate to Porto of Portugal.

== See also ==
- 1983 Soviet Top League
- 1983 Soviet First League
- 1983 Soviet Second League
