= 1986 Soviet Cup final =

- Event: 1985-86 Soviet Cup
Torpedo Moscow	Shakhter Donetsk
1	0
- Date: 2 May 1986
- Venue: Lenin's Central Stadium, Moscow
- Referee: Ivan Timoshenko (Rostov-on-Don)
- Attendance: 35,000

The 1986 Soviet Cup final was a football match that took place at the Lenin's Central Stadium, Moscow on 2 May 1986. The match was the 45th Soviet Cup final and it was contested by Torpedo Moscow and Shakhtar Donetsk.

Vladimir Kobzev scored the only goal of the match after 44 minutes as Torpedo Moscow won the competition for the sixth time. As winners of the competition, Torpedo Moscow qualified to represent the Soviet Union in the 1986–87 European Cup Winners' Cup.

== Background ==
Shakhter Donetsk had reached the Soviet Cup final on seven previous occasions, winning the trophy four times (in 1961, 1962, 1980 and 1983).

Torpedo Moscow had reached the final on 11 previous occasions, winning the trophy five times (in 1949, 1952, 1960, 1968 and 1972).

The teams had met once before in the final of the competition, Shakhtar Stalino – as Donetsk was known at the time – winning 3–1 in 1961.

== Road to Moscow ==
As both Torpedo Moscow and Shakhtar Donetsk competed in the Soviet Top League, they entered the competition in the round of 32.

Note: In all results below, the score of the finalist is given first (H: home; A: away).

Torpedo Moscow		Round	Shakhter Donetsk	
Opponent	Result	1985–86 Soviet Cup	Opponent	Result
Pakhtakor Tashkent (A)	3–2 (a.e.t.)	First round	Kuban Krasnodar (H)	5–1
SKA Khabarovsk (H)	2–0	Second round	Kolos Nikopol (A)	1–0
Chernomorets Odessa (A)	2–0	Quarter-finals	Daugava Riga (H)	2–1
Spartak Moscow (H)	3–2	Semi-finals	Zenit Leningrad (A)	2–2 (a.e.t.) (4–3 p)

== Match details ==
Shortly before halftime, Vladimir Kobzev scored to give Torpedo Moscow the lead at the break. There was no scoring in the second half as the Russian side defeated their Ukrainian counterparts to win the competition.

2 May 1986

Torpedo Moscow	1–0	Shakhter Donetsk
Kobzev 44'

Lenin's Central Stadium, Moscow
Attendance: 35,000
Referee: Ivan Timoshenko (Rostov-on-Don)

FC Torpedo Moscow
FCShakhtar Donetsk

FC Torpedo Moscow:
GK	(Tajik Soviet Socialist Republic) Valeri Sarychev
(Russian Soviet Federative Socialist Republic) Vladimir Sochnov
(Russian Soviet Federative Socialist Republic) Valentin Kovach
(Russian Soviet Federative Socialist Republic) Aleksandr Gostenin
(Russian Soviet Federative Socialist Republic) Sergei Prigoda (c)
(Russian Soviet Federative Socialist Republic) Sergey Shavlo
(Russian Soviet Federative Socialist Republic) Yuri Savichev
(Russian Soviet Federative Socialist Republic) Sergei Mushtruev	(substituted off) 79'
(Russian Soviet Federative Socialist Republic) Vladimir Grechnyov	(substituted off) 64'
(Russian Soviet Federative Socialist Republic) Aleksandr Polukarov
(Russian Soviet Federative Socialist Republic) Andrei Redkous	(substituted off) 29'
Substitutes:
(Russian Soviet Federative Socialist Republic) Nikolai Savichev	(substituted on) 79'
(Byelorussian Soviet Socialist Republic) Valeriy Shaveika	(substituted on) 64'
(Russian Soviet Federative Socialist Republic) Vladimir Kobzev	(substituted on) 29'
Manager:
(Russian Soviet Federative Socialist Republic) Valentin Ivanov

FC Shakhter Donetsk:
GK	(Ukrainian Soviet Socialist Republic) Serhiy Zolotnytsky
(Ukrainian Soviet Socialist Republic) Oleksiy Varnavsky
(Ukrainian Soviet Socialist Republic) Oleksandr Sopko
(Ukrainian Soviet Socialist Republic) Valeriy Hoshkoderya	(substituted off) 60'
(Ukrainian Soviet Socialist Republic) Volodymyr Parkhomenko	(substituted off) 75'
(Ukrainian Soviet Socialist Republic) Valeriy Rudakov
(Ukrainian Soviet Socialist Republic) Serhiy Yashchenko
(Ukrainian Soviet Socialist Republic) Mykhaylo Sokolovsky (c)	(substituted off) 46'
(Ukrainian Soviet Socialist Republic) Yuriy Hulyayev
(Ukrainian Soviet Socialist Republic) Oleh Smolyaninov
(Ukrainian Soviet Socialist Republic) Viktor Hrachov
Substitutes:
(Ukrainian Soviet Socialist Republic) Serhiy Morozov	(substituted on) 60'
(Ukrainian Soviet Socialist Republic) Serhiy Kravchenko	(substituted on) 75'
(Ukrainian Soviet Socialist Republic) Ihor Petrov	(substituted on) 46'
Manager:
(Ukrainian Soviet Socialist Republic) Oleh Bazylevych

MATCH OFFICIALS

- Assistant referees:
  - A.Khokhryakov (Yoshkar-Ola)
  - N.Zakharov (Vladimir)
- Fourth official:( )

MATCH RULES

- 90 minutes.
- 30 minutes of extra-time if necessary.
- Penalty shoot-out if scores still level.
- Seven named substitutes
- Maximum of 3 substitutions.

== Aftermath ==
Following their cup win, Torpedo Moscow represented the Soviet Union in the 1986–87 European Cup Winners' Cup. They would win the competition after defeating Carl Zeiss Jena of East Germany 2–0 in the final at the Rheinstadion in Düsseldorf, West Germany.

== See also ==
- Soviet Top League 1986
- Soviet First League 1986
- Soviet Second League 1986
