= 1984 Soviet Cup final =

- Event: 1984 Soviet Cup
Dinamo Moscow	Zenit Leningrad
2	0
- Date: 24 June 1984
- Venue: Tsentralny Stadion imeni Lenina, Moscow
- Referee: Romualdas Juška (Vilnius)
- Attendance: 43,500

The 1984 Soviet Cup final was a football match that took place at the Lenin's Central Stadium, Moscow on June 24, 1984. The match was the 43rd Soviet Cup final and it was contested by Dynamo Moscow and Zenit Leningrad.

After a goalless 90 minutes, Valeriy Gazzaev and Aleksandr Borodyuk scored in extra time as Dynamo Moscow won 2–0 for their sixth Soviet Cup title.

== Background ==
Dynamo Moscow had reached the Soviet Cup final on 10 previous occasions, winning five and losing five. In their previous appearance in the final in 1979, they lost 5–4 on penalties after a goalless draw with Dinamo Tbilisi. They had most recently won the cup in 1977 after defeating Torpedo Moscow 1–0 in the final.

Zenit Leningrad had only reached the Soviet Cup final on one previous occasion in 1944 when they defeated CDKA Moscow 2–1 to lift the trophy.

== Road to Moscow ==
All sixteen Soviet Top League clubs did not have to go through qualification to get into the competition, so Dinamo and Zenit both qualified for the competition automatically.

=== Dynamo Moscow ===
In the round of 32, Dynamo Moscow defeated Nistru Kishinev (Moldavian SSR) 1–0. They then defeated Dnepr Dnepropetrovsk (Ukrainian SSR) 2–1. In the quarter-finals, they defeated Chornomorets Odesa (Ukrainian SSR) 3–1 after extra time. Dynamo Moscow then defeated Dinamo Minsk (Byelorussian SSR) 4–0 in the semi-final to advance to the final.

=== Zenit Leningrad ===
In the round of 32, Zenit Leningrad defeated Daugava Riga (Latvian SSR) 3–0. They then drew 3–3 with Ararat Yerevan (Armenian SSR) after extra time and advanced to the quarter-finals 4–3 on penalties. In the quarter-finals, they again needed penalties after a goalless draw with Torpedo Moscow (Russian SFSR). Zenit Leningrad advanced 7–6 on penalties. Their semi-final also went to extra time as they defeated Fakel Voronezh (Russian SFSR) 1–0 to reach the final.

Note: In all results below, the score of the finalist is given first (H: home; A: away).

Dinamo Moscow		Round	Zenit Leningrad	
Opponent	Result	1984–85 Soviet Cup	Opponent	Result
Nistru Kishinev (H)	1–0	Round of 32	Daugava Riga (A)	3–0
Dnepr Dnepropetrovsk (A)	2–1	Round of 16	Ararat Yerevan (H)	3–3 (a.e.t.) (4–3 p)
Chernomorets Odessa (H)	3–1 (a.e.t.)	Quarter-finals	Torpedo Moscow (A)	0–0 (a.e.t.) (7–6 p)
Dinamo Minsk (A)	4–0	Semi-finals	Fakel Voronezh (H)	1–0 (a.e.t.)

== Match details ==
1984-06-24
?:? LST

Dinamo Moscow	2–0 (a.e.t.)	Zenit Leningrad
Gazzaev 97'; Borodiuk 116'	Report

Tsentralny Stadion imeni Lenina, Moscow
Attendance: 43,500
Referee: Romualdas Juška (Vilnius)

Dinamo Moscow:
GK	(Russian Soviet Federative Socialist Republic) Aleksei Prudnikov
(Russian Soviet Federative Socialist Republic) Igor Bulanov
(Russian Soviet Federative Socialist Republic) Aleksandr Novikov (c)	(yellow card) 87'
(Russian Soviet Federative Socialist Republic) Vladimir Fomichyov
(Byelorussian Soviet Socialist Republic) Aleksandr Golovnya	(yellow card) 100'
(Russian Soviet Federative Socialist Republic) Yuri Mentiukov
(Russian Soviet Federative Socialist Republic) Renat Ataullin
(Russian Soviet Federative Socialist Republic) Aleksandr Molodtsov	(substituted off) 46'
(Russian Soviet Federative Socialist Republic) Aleksandr Borodiuk
(Russian Soviet Federative Socialist Republic) Vasili Karataev	(substituted off) 107'
(Russian Soviet Federative Socialist Republic) Valeriy Gazzaev	(substituted off) 117'
Substitutes:
(Ukrainian Soviet Socialist Republic) Aleksandr Khapsalis	(substituted on) 46'
(Russian Soviet Federative Socialist Republic) Ievgeny Mileshkin	(substituted on) 107'
(Russian Soviet Federative Socialist Republic) Valeri Matiunin	(substituted on) 117'
Manager:
(Russian Soviet Federative Socialist Republic) Aleksandr Sevidov

Zenit Leningrad:
GK	(Russian Soviet Federative Socialist Republic) Mikhail Biriukov (c)
(Russian Soviet Federative Socialist Republic) Anatoli Davydov
(Russian Soviet Federative Socialist Republic) Alexei Stepanov
(Russian Soviet Federative Socialist Republic) Sergei Kuznetsov
(Russian Soviet Federative Socialist Republic) Sergei Vedeneev
(Russian Soviet Federative Socialist Republic) Gennadi Timofeev	(yellow card) 27'
(Russian Soviet Federative Socialist Republic) Vladimir Dolgopolov	(substituted off) 46'
(Russian Soviet Federative Socialist Republic) Yuri Zheludkov
(Russian Soviet Federative Socialist Republic) Boris Chukhlov
(Turkmen Soviet Socialist Republic) Valeri Broshin	(yellow card) 110'
(Russian Soviet Federative Socialist Republic) Vladimir Klementiev	(substituted off) 91'
Substitutes:
(Russian Soviet Federative Socialist Republic) Aleksandr Zakharikov	(substituted on) 46'
(Russian Soviet Federative Socialist Republic) Sergei Dmitriev	(substituted on) 91'	(substituted off) 109'
(Russian Soviet Federative Socialist Republic) Igor Komarov	(substituted on) 109'
Manager:
(Russian Soviet Federative Socialist Republic) Pavel Sadyrin

MATCH OFFICIALS

- Assistant referees:
  - Ivan Timoshenko (Rostov-na-Donu)
  - Vladimir Kuznetsov (Omsk)
- Fourth official:( )

MATCH RULES

- 90 minutes.
- 30 minutes of extra-time if necessary.
- Penalty shoot-out if scores still level.
- Seven named substitutes
- Maximum of 3 substitutions.

Soviet Cup 1984 Winners
Dynamo Moscow
Sixth title

== See also ==
- 1984 Soviet Top League
- 1984 Soviet First League
- 1984 Soviet Second League
