= 1984 in Soviet football =

Football in the Soviet Union
- Season: 1984

Men's football
- Top League: Zenit Leningrad
- First League: Fakel Voronezh
- Second League: Krylia Sovetov Kuibyshev (Finals 1); Kotaik Abovian (Finals 2); Dinamo Stavropol (Finals 3)
- Soviet Cup: Shakhter Donetsk

The 1984 Soviet football championship was the 53rd seasons of competitive football in the Soviet Union. Zenit Leningrad won the Top League championship becoming the Soviet domestic champions for the first time.

== Honours ==
Competition		Winner	Runner-up
Top League		Zenit Leningrad (1)	Spartak Moscow
First League		Fakel Voronezh (2)	Torpedo Kutaisi
Second League	Finals 1	Krylia Sovetov Kuibyshev	Niva Vinnitsa
Second League	Finals 2	Kotaik Abovian	Geolog Tyumen
Second League	Finals 3	Dinamo Stavropol	Dinamo Samarkand
Soviet Cup		Dinamo Moscow (6)	Zenit Leningrad

Notes = Number in parentheses is the times that club has won that honour. * indicates new record for competition

== Soviet Union football championship ==
=== Top League ===
Pos	Team	Pld	W	D	L	GF	GA	GD	Pts	Qualification or relegation
1	(Russian Soviet Federative Socialist Republic) Zenit Leningrad (C)	34	19	9	6	60	32	+28	47	Qualification for European Cup first round
2	(Russian Soviet Federative Socialist Republic) Spartak Moscow	34	18	9	7	53	29	+24	45	Qualification for UEFA Cup first round
3	(Ukrainian Soviet Socialist Republic) Dnipro Dnipropetrovsk	34	17	8	9	54	40	+14	42	Qualification for UEFA Cup first round
4	(Ukrainian Soviet Socialist Republic) Chornomorets Odessa	34	16	9	9	49	38	+11	41	Qualification for UEFA Cup first round
5	(Byelorussian Soviet Socialist Republic) Dinamo Minsk	34	15	13	6	43	28	+15	40 (Note: 3 points deducted (10 draw limit))	
6	(Russian Soviet Federative Socialist Republic) Torpedo Moscow	34	15	10	9	43	36	+7	40	
7	(Georgian Soviet Socialist Republic) Dinamo Tbilisi	34	14	8	12	36	41	−5	36	
8	(Kazakh Soviet Socialist Republic) Kairat Alma-Ata	34	13	8	13	44	42	+2	34	
9	(Lithuanian Soviet Socialist Republic) Žalgiris Vilnius	34	12	11	11	30	38	−8	34 (Note: 1 point deducted (10 draw limit))	
10	(Ukrainian Soviet Socialist Republic) Dynamo Kyiv	34	12	13	9	46	30	+16	34	Qualification for Cup Winners' Cup first round
11	(Armenian Soviet Socialist Republic) Ararat Yerevan	34	12	7	15	46	50	−4	31	
12	(Ukrainian Soviet Socialist Republic) Metalist Kharkiv	34	12	5	17	42	53	−11	29	
13	(Ukrainian Soviet Socialist Republic) Shakhtar Donetsk	34	10	9	15	47	46	+1	29	
14	(Russian Soviet Federative Socialist Republic) SKA Rostov-on-Don	34	10	7	17	48	58	−10	27	
15	(Azerbaijan Soviet Socialist Republic) Neftchi Baku	34	9	8	17	30	50	−20	26	
16	(Russian Soviet Federative Socialist Republic) Dynamo Moscow	34	8	10	16	35	43	−8	26	
17	(Uzbek Soviet Socialist Republic) Pakhtakor Tashkent (R)	34	10	5	19	37	58	−21	25	Relegation to First League
18	(Russian Soviet Federative Socialist Republic) CSKA Moscow (R)	34	5	9	20	24	55	−31	19	Relegation to First League

(C) Champions; (R) Relegated

=== First League ===
Pos	Team	Pld	W	D	L	GF	GA	GD	Pts	Promotion or relegation
1	(Russian Soviet Federative Socialist Republic) Fakel Voronezh (C, P)	42	25	7	10	61	30	+31	57	Promotion to Top League
2	(Georgian Soviet Socialist Republic) Torpedo Kutaisi (P)	42	23	9	10	76	55	+21	55	Promotion to Top League
3	(Ukrainian Soviet Socialist Republic) SKA Karpaty Lvov	42	20	9	13	63	44	+19	49	
4	(Russian Soviet Federative Socialist Republic) Kuban Krasnodar	42	20	9	13	60	41	+19	49	
5	(Ukrainian Soviet Socialist Republic) Metallurg Zaporozhia	42	18	12	12	57	43	+14	48	
6	(Russian Soviet Federative Socialist Republic) Lokomotiv Moscow	42	17	13	12	44	37	+7	46 (Note: There was a draw limit for the draws earned, 12. Only twelve draws earn a point, in contrast, over the limit draws earn no points.)	
7	(Latvian Soviet Socialist Republic) Daugava Riga	42	16	14	12	65	50	+15	44	
8	(Tajik Soviet Socialist Republic) Pamir Dushanbe	42	16	11	15	51	44	+7	43	
9	(Russian Soviet Federative Socialist Republic) Kuzbass Kemerovo	42	17	8	17	56	51	+5	42	
10	(Georgian Soviet Socialist Republic) Guria Lanchkhuti	42	16	10	16	49	52	−3	42	
11	(Georgian Soviet Socialist Republic) Dinamo Batumi	42	16	8	18	58	67	−9	40	
12	(Russian Soviet Federative Socialist Republic) Iskra Smolensk	42	15	10	17	44	47	−3	40	
13	(Uzbek Soviet Socialist Republic) Zvezda Dzhizak	42	17	5	20	51	64	−13	39	
14	(Russian Soviet Federative Socialist Republic) SKA Khabarovsk	42	14	11	17	55	59	−4	39	
15	(Russian Soviet Federative Socialist Republic) Rotor Volgograd	42	15	8	19	63	78	−15	38	
16	(Russian Soviet Federative Socialist Republic) Spartak Ordjonikidze	42	15	8	19	42	51	−9	38	
17	(Russian Soviet Federative Socialist Republic) Shinnik Yaroslavl	42	13	12	17	49	50	−1	38	
18	(Moldavian Soviet Socialist Republic) Nistru Kishinev	42	13	12	17	45	58	−13	38	
19	(Ukrainian Soviet Socialist Republic) Kolos Nikopol	42	13	12	17	50	59	−9	38	
20	(Ukrainian Soviet Socialist Republic) Zarya Voroshilovgrad (R)	42	13	11	18	54	61	−7	37	Relegation to Second League
21	(Ukrainian Soviet Socialist Republic) Tavria Simferopol (R)	42	12	11	19	43	58	−15	35	Relegation to Second League
22	(Russian Soviet Federative Socialist Republic) Irtysh Omsk (R)	42	8	10	24	35	72	−37	26	Relegation to Second League

Source: rsssf.com
(C) Champions; (P) Promoted; (R) Relegated

=== Second League (finals) ===
[Oct 21 – Nov 8]

=== Finals 1 ===
Pos	Rep	Team	Pld	W	D	L	GF	GA	GD	Pts	Promotion
1	RUS	Krylya Sovetov Kuibyshev	4	3	1	0	9	3	+6	7	Promoted
2	UKR	Niva Vinnitsa	4	1	1	2	3	3	0	3	
3	KAZ	Tselinnik Tselinograd	4	1	0	3	2	8	−6	2	

=== Finals 2 ===
Pos	Rep	Team	Pld	W	D	L	GF	GA	GD	Pts	Promotion
1	ARM	Kotaik Abovyan	4	2	2	0	5	3	+2	6	Promoted
2	RUS	Geolog Tyumen	4	2	1	1	6	5	+1	5	
3	RUS	Zorkiy Krasnogorsk	4	0	1	3	3	6	−3	1	

=== Finals 3 ===
Pos	Rep	Team	Pld	W	D	L	GF	GA	GD	Pts	Promotion
1	RUS	Dinamo Stavropol	4	2	1	1	5	3	+2	5	Promoted
2	UZB	Dinamo Samarkand	4	1	2	1	3	4	−1	4	
3	RUS	Baltika Kaliningrad	4	1	1	2	3	4	−1	3	

Source: rsssf.com

=== Top goalscorers ===
Top League

- Sergei Andreyev (SKA Rostov-na-Donu) – 19 goals

First League

- Revaz Chelebadze (Dinamo Batumi) – 27 goals
