= Serhiy Akymenko =

Ukrainian footballer

Personal information
- Full name: Serhiy Vasylyovych Akymenko
- Date of birth: 13 December 1959 (age 66)
- Place of birth: Stalino, Soviet Union (now Ukraine)
- Height: 1.78 m (5 ft 10 in)
- Position: Forward

Senior career*
| Years | Team | Apps | (Gls) |
| 1977–1987 | Shakhtar Donetsk | 114 | (10) |
| 1987–1988 | Shakhtar Horlivka | 83 | (19) |
| 1990–1995 | Shakhtar Snizhne (amateurs) | 48 | (20) |
- * Club domestic league appearances and goals

Serhiy Vasylyovych Akymenko (Ukrainian: Сергій Васильович Акименко; born 13 December 1959) is a retired Soviet and Ukrainian football forward.

== Biography ==
According to Viktor Zvyahintsev, Akymenko was spotted by Viktor Nosov when Akymenko was 19. In 1977, he was playing for Shakhtar Donetsk, often for their reserve (doubles) team in the Soviet Top League for doubles. Akymenko made his debut in the Soviet Top League on the Soviet Victory Day, 9 May 1981, when Shakhtar was visiting the Armenian Ararat. Playing at the Hrazdan Stadium, he came on as a substitute for Viktor Hrachov in the 89th minute, but the match ended in a scoreless draw. From 1981 to 1985, Akymenko was a regular on Shakhtar's first squad, but later returned to the reserves. During that period, he became a holder and a runner of the Soviet Cup. In 1987, Akymenko moved to Horlivka, where he played for the Soviet Second League (3rd tier), Shakhtar Horlivka. From 1990 to 1994–95, Akymenko played for Shakhtar Snizhne, which competed in the KFK [amateurs] football competitions and represented the city of Snizhne. During the 1992–93 season, he topped the list of the tournament scorers.

In 2000, Akymenko worked as a director of the All-Ukrainian newspaper "Trud".

== Honours ==
=== Club ===
==== Shakhtar Donetsk ====
- Soviet Cup: 1983; runner-up: 1984–85

==== Shakhtar Snizhe ====
- Ukrainian Football Championship for KFK:
  - Top scorer: 1992–93
