= 1987 Soviet Cup final =

- Event: 1986-87 Soviet Cup
Dynamo Kyiv	Dinamo Minsk
3	3
- Date: 14 June 1987
- Venue: Lenin's Central Stadium, Moscow
- Referee: Valeriy Butenko (Moscow)
- Attendance: 75,000

The 1987 Soviet Cup final was a football match that took place at the Lenin's Central Stadium, Moscow on 14 June 1987. The match was the 46th Soviet Cup final and it was contested by Dynamo Kyiv and Dinamo Minsk. It was the second and final time that a team from the Byelorussian Soviet Socialist Republic contested the final.

With half an hour left to play, Dinamo Minsk established a 3–1 lead in the match. However, a comeback by Dynamo Kyiv culminated in a last-minute equaliser from Oleksandr Zavarov. With no further scoring in extra time, Dynamo Kyiv defeated Dinamo Minsk 4–2 on penalties to win the competition for the eighth time.

As Dynamo Kyiv also won the 1986 Soviet Top League, Dinamo Minsk qualified to represent the Soviet Union in the 1987–88 European Cup Winners' Cup.

== Background ==
Dynamo Kyiv had reached the Soviet Cup final on eight previous occasions, winning the trophy seven times (in 1954, 1964, 1966, 1974, 1978, 1982 and 1985). They were the most successful team from the Ukrainian Soviet Socialist Republic in the history of the competition.

Dinamo Minsk had reached the final just once before but had never won the competition after losing 2–1 after extra time in a replay to Spartak Moscow. They were the only team from the Byelorussian Soviet Socialist Republic to reach the final.

== Road to Moscow ==
As both Dynamo Kyiv and Dinamo Minsk competed in the Soviet Top League, they entered the competition in the round of 32.

Dynamo Kyiv
Round 1	Dynamo St.	1–2	Dynamo K.
Round 2	Dynamo	2–1	Kyapaz
Quarter-final	Dynamo	4–0	SKA Karpaty
Semi-final	Dynamo K.	0–0	Dynamo M.

Dinamo Minsk
Round 1	Dinamo	4–1	Kotayk
Round 2	Zenit	0–1	Dinamo
Quarter-final	Dinamo	3–2	Torpedo
Semi-final	Tavriya	0–2	Dinamo

== Match details ==
14 June 1987

Dynamo Kyiv	3–3	Dinamo Minsk
Rats 45'; Kuznetsov 63'; Zavarov 90'		Kondratiev 20'; Zygmantovich 45' (pen.); Aleinikov 60'
Penalties
Demyanenko (penalty scored); Mykhailychenko (penalty scored); Baltacha (penalty scored); Yevtushenko (penalty scored)	4–2	(penalty scored) Myatlitski; (penalty missed) Borovsky; (penalty missed) Aleinikov; (penalty scored) Kurnenin

Lenin's Central Stadium, Moscow
Attendance: 75,000
Referee: Valeri Butenko (Moscow)

Dynamo Kyiv	Dіnamo Minsk

FC Dynamo Kyiv:
GK	(Ukrainian Soviet Socialist Republic) Viktor Chanov
MF	(Ukrainian Soviet Socialist Republic) Oleksiy Mykhailychenko
DF	(Ukrainian Soviet Socialist Republic) Serhiy Baltacha
DF	(Ukrainian Soviet Socialist Republic) Oleh Kuznetsov
DF	(Ukrainian Soviet Socialist Republic) Anatoliy Demyanenko (c)
MF	(Ukrainian Soviet Socialist Republic) Vasyl Rats
MF	(Ukrainian Soviet Socialist Republic) Pavlo Yakovenko
DF	(Ukrainian Soviet Socialist Republic) Andriy Bal
MF	(Ukrainian Soviet Socialist Republic) Oleksandr Zavarov
FW	(Ukrainian Soviet Socialist Republic) Vadym Yevtushenko
FW	(Ukrainian Soviet Socialist Republic) Oleh Blokhin	(substituted off) 57'
Substitutes:
MF	(Ukrainian Soviet Socialist Republic) Ivan Yaremchuk	(substituted on) 57' (substituted off) 70'
DF	(Ukrainian Soviet Socialist Republic) Volodymyr Horilyi	(substituted on) 70'
Manager:
(Ukrainian Soviet Socialist Republic) Valeriy Lobanovsky

FC Dinamo Minsk:
GK	(Byelorussian Soviet Socialist Republic) Andrei Satsunkevich
DF	(Byelorussian Soviet Socialist Republic) Sergei Borovsky
DF	(Byelorussian Soviet Socialist Republic) Alyaksandr Myatlitski
DF	(Byelorussian Soviet Socialist Republic) Viktor Yanushevsky
MF	(Byelorussian Soviet Socialist Republic) Viktor Sokol	(substituted off) 80'
DF	(Byelorussian Soviet Socialist Republic) Andrei Zygmantovich	Yellow card
MF	(Byelorussian Soviet Socialist Republic) Sergey Gotsmanov
MF	(Russian Soviet Federative Socialist Republic) Sergei Derkach	(substituted off) 87'
MF	(Byelorussian Soviet Socialist Republic) Sergei Aleinikov
FW	(Byelorussian Soviet Socialist Republic) Andrei Shalimo	(substituted off) 56'
FW	(Byelorussian Soviet Socialist Republic) Georgi Kondratiev (c)
Substitutes:
DF	(Russian Soviet Federative Socialist Republic) Yuri Kurnenin	(substituted on) 80'
MF	(Byelorussian Soviet Socialist Republic) Alyaksandr Kisten	(substituted on) 87'
FW	(Byelorussian Soviet Socialist Republic) Ihar Hurynovich	(substituted on) 56'
Manager:
(Byelorussian Soviet Socialist Republic) Ivan Savostikov

MATCH OFFICIALS

- Assistant referees:
  - A.Kirillov (Moscow)
  - S.Khusainov (Moscow)
- Fourth official:( )

MATCH RULES

- 90 minutes.
- 30 minutes of extra-time if necessary.
- Penalty shoot-out if scores still level.
- Seven named substitutes
- Maximum of 3 substitutions.

== Aftermath ==
As Dynamo Kyiv had won the 1986 Soviet Top League and qualified to compete in the 1987–88 European Cup, Dinamo Minsk represented the Soviet Union in the 1987–88 European Cup Winners' Cup. They were eliminated in the quarter-finals after losing 2–1 on aggregate to Mechelen of Belgium.

== See also ==
- Soviet Top League 1987
- Soviet First League 1987
- Soviet Second League 1987
