= Yashchenko =

Yashchenko or Yaschenko (Ukrainian: Ященко) is a gender-neutral Ukrainian surname. Notable people with the surname include:

- Serhiy Yashchenko (born 1959), Ukrainian football manager and former player
- Vladimir Yashchenko (1959–1999), Ukrainian high jumper
