= Sopko =

Sopko is a surname. Notable people with the surname include:

- Andrew Sopko (born 1994), American baseball pitcher
- John F. Sopko (born 1952), United States Special Inspector General for Afghanistan Reconstruction
- Martin Sopko (born 1982), Slovak volleyball player
- Oleksandr Sopko (born 1958), Ukrainian footballer
