= 1984 Soviet Cup =

1984 Cup of USSR in Football
Кубок СССР

Tournament details
- Country: Soviet Union
- Dates: February 18 – June 24
- Teams: 48 ▲

Final positions
- Champions: Dinamo Moscow
- Runners-up: Zenit Leningrad

The 1984 Soviet Cup was an association football cup competition of the Soviet Union. The winner of the competition, Dinamo Moscow qualified for the continental tournament.

== Competition overview ==
Competitions for the Soviet Cup in 1984 were held on a knockout system with the participation of 48 teams (18 Top league teams, 21 First and 9 Second league teams).

In the Cup tournament bracket, all 48 teams were seeded by lot draw.

On February 18, 32 teams began competitions including 21 of 22 teams of the First league (Shinnik Yaroslavl did not participate in the Cup due to a sanction for failure to appear to a game last season), 2 teams that received the right to play in the Top league (promotion), 6 zone winners of the Second league (Note: Since 1980 there were actually 9 zones instead of 6 that existed before 1980, however the referee of the All-Union category Aleksandr Menshikov indicated in the handbook "Futbol" that there were 6 winners.) and 3 teams relegated from the First league at the end of last year (Dnepr Mogilev, Tekstilschik Ivanovo, Dinamo Kirov).

16 Top league teams started in the Round of 32.

If in the 1/32 finals the teams won on their home turf, then in the next round they played on the opponents’ turfs, and those teams that won the first round away played on their home turfs. To determine the location of subsequent meetings, a record of the number of visiting and hosting of teams has been kept. In case of equality of visiting and hosting, the home team was determined by lot.

If the game, including the final, would end in a draw, extra time was assigned (two periods of 15 minutes each). If extra time did not reveal the strongest, the winner would have been determined by penalty kicks in accordance with FIFA Regulations. In games for the Soviet Cup, no more than three players are allowed to be substituted during the game. The final is held on June 24 in Moscow, at the Central Stadium named after V.I. Lenin.

== Participating teams ==
Enter in 2nd Preliminary	Enter in First Preliminary Round				
1984 Vysshaya Liga; 16/18 teams	1984 Vysshaya Liga; 2/18 teams	1984 Pervaya Liga; 21/22 teams	1984 Vtoraya Liga; 9/162 teams		
✓ Zenit Leningrad; ✓ Spartak Moscow; ✓ Dnepr Dnepropetrovsk; ✓ Chernomorets Odessa; ✓ Dinamo Minsk; ✓ Torpedo Moscow; ✓ Iberia Tbilisi; ✓ Zalgiris Vilnius; ✓ Dinamo Kiev; ✓ Ararat Erevan; ✓ Metallist Kharkov; ✓ Shakhter Donetsk; ✓ Neftchi Baku; ✓ Dinamo Moscow; ✓ CSKA Moscow; ✓ Pakhtakor Tashkent	✓ Kairat Alma-Ata; ✓ SKA Rostov-na-Donu	✓ Fakel Voronezh; ✓ FC Torpedo Kutaisi; ✓ SKA Karpaty Lvov; ✓ Kuban Krasnodar; ✓ Metallurg Zaporozhye; ✓ Lokomotiv Moscow; ✓ Daugava Riga; ✓ Pamir Dushanbe; ✓ Kuzbass Kemerovo; ✓ Guria Lanchkhuti; ✓ Dinamo Batumi; ✓ Iskra Smolensk; ✓ Zvezda Dzhizak; ✓ SKA Khabarovsk; ✓ Rotor Volgograd; ✓ Spartak Ordzhonikidze; ✓ Nistru Kishenev; ✓ Kolos Nikopol; ✓ Zaria Voroshilovgrad; ✓ Tavria Simferopol; ✓ Irtysh Omsk	✓ Tekstilschik Ivanovo; ✓ Znamya Truda Orekhovo-Zuyevo	✓ Krylia Sovetov Kuibyshev; ✓ Dinamo Kirov	none
✓ Zenit Leningrad; ✓ Spartak Moscow; ✓ Dnepr Dnepropetrovsk; ✓ Chernomorets Odessa; ✓ Dinamo Minsk; ✓ Torpedo Moscow; ✓ Iberia Tbilisi; ✓ Zalgiris Vilnius; ✓ Dinamo Kiev; ✓ Ararat Erevan; ✓ Metallist Kharkov; ✓ Shakhter Donetsk; ✓ Neftchi Baku; ✓ Dinamo Moscow; ✓ CSKA Moscow; ✓ Pakhtakor Tashkent	✓ Kairat Alma-Ata; ✓ SKA Rostov-na-Donu	✓ Fakel Voronezh; ✓ FC Torpedo Kutaisi; ✓ SKA Karpaty Lvov; ✓ Kuban Krasnodar; ✓ Metallurg Zaporozhye; ✓ Lokomotiv Moscow; ✓ Daugava Riga; ✓ Pamir Dushanbe; ✓ Kuzbass Kemerovo; ✓ Guria Lanchkhuti; ✓ Dinamo Batumi; ✓ Iskra Smolensk; ✓ Zvezda Dzhizak; ✓ SKA Khabarovsk; ✓ Rotor Volgograd; ✓ Spartak Ordzhonikidze; ✓ Nistru Kishenev; ✓ Kolos Nikopol; ✓ Zaria Voroshilovgrad; ✓ Tavria Simferopol; ✓ Irtysh Omsk	none	✓ Dnepr Mogilev; ✓ Metallurg Lipetsk	✓ SKA Kiev
✓ Zenit Leningrad; ✓ Spartak Moscow; ✓ Dnepr Dnepropetrovsk; ✓ Chernomorets Odessa; ✓ Dinamo Minsk; ✓ Torpedo Moscow; ✓ Iberia Tbilisi; ✓ Zalgiris Vilnius; ✓ Dinamo Kiev; ✓ Ararat Erevan; ✓ Metallist Kharkov; ✓ Shakhter Donetsk; ✓ Neftchi Baku; ✓ Dinamo Moscow; ✓ CSKA Moscow; ✓ Pakhtakor Tashkent	✓ Kairat Alma-Ata; ✓ SKA Rostov-na-Donu	✓ Fakel Voronezh; ✓ FC Torpedo Kutaisi; ✓ SKA Karpaty Lvov; ✓ Kuban Krasnodar; ✓ Metallurg Zaporozhye; ✓ Lokomotiv Moscow; ✓ Daugava Riga; ✓ Pamir Dushanbe; ✓ Kuzbass Kemerovo; ✓ Guria Lanchkhuti; ✓ Dinamo Batumi; ✓ Iskra Smolensk; ✓ Zvezda Dzhizak; ✓ SKA Khabarovsk; ✓ Rotor Volgograd; ✓ Spartak Ordzhonikidze; ✓ Nistru Kishenev; ✓ Kolos Nikopol; ✓ Zaria Voroshilovgrad; ✓ Tavria Simferopol; ✓ Irtysh Omsk	✓ Neftyanik Fergana	✓ Shakhter Karaganda	none

Source: []

Notes

- Shinnik Yaroslavl (II) was barred from competing for failure to arrive to a game last season.

== Competition schedule ==
=== First preliminary round ===
All games took place on February 18, 1984.

Fakel Voronezh	2:1	Tekstilschik Ivanovo	(in Sochi)
Guria Lanchkhuti	1:2	Daugava Riga	(in Alakhadze)
Kairat Alma-Ata	1:1	SKA Kiev	(a.e.t.), (4–5 p) (in Chimkent)
Kolos Nikopol	0:1	Znamya Truda Orekhovo Zuevo	(a.e.t.)
Kuban Krasnodar	1:0	Irtysh Omsk	(a.e.t.)
Kuzbass Kemerovo	3:1	Zvezda Jizak	(in Uzhgorod)
Lokomotiv Moscow	0:2	Iskra Smolensk	(in Khosta)
Metallurg Zaporozhie	2:0	Krylia Sovetov Kuibyshev
Nistru Kishinev	2:0	Neftyanik Fergana
Pamir Dushanbe	1:1	Dinamo Kirov	(a.e.t.), (4–2 p) (in Kurgan-Tyube)
Rotor Volgograd	1:2	Dnepr Mogilev	(in Adler)
SKA Khabarovsk	2:1	Zaria Voroshilovgrad	(a.e.t.) (in Moscow)
SKA Rostov-na-Donu	1:0	Shakhter Karaganda	(in Sochi)
SKA Karpaty Lvov	1:0	Spartak Ordzhonikidze	(a.e.t.) (in Moscow)
Tavria Simferopol	3:1	Dinamo Batumi
Torpedo Kutaisi	3:1	Metallurg Lipetsk

=== Second preliminary round ===
The base game day was February 22, 1984

Dinamo Moscow	1:0	Nistru Kishinev	(February 21, 1984)
Chernomorets Odessa	3:0	Kuban Krasnodar	(in Izmail)
CSKA Moscow	1:0	Dnepr Mogilev	(in Sochi)
Dinamo Kiev	3:1	SKA-Karpaty Lvov	(a.e.t.) (in Sochi)
Dinamo Minsk	2:1	SKA Khabarovsk	(in Sukhumi)
Dnepr Dnepropetrovsk	3:2	Kuzbass Kemerovo
Iskra Smolensk	0:1	Spartak Moscow	(in Sochi)
Metallist Kharkov	2:0	Metallurg Zaporozhie
Neftchi Baku	2:4	SKA Rostov-na-Donu
Pakhtakor Tashkent	0:1	Fakel Voronezh
Shakhter Donetsk	2:0	Torpedo Kutaisi	(in Sochi)
SKA Kiev	0:2	Dinamo Tbilisi
Torpedo Moscow	3:0	Tavria Simferopol	(in Adler)
Znamya Truda Orekhovo-Zuevo	0:1	Ararat Yerevan
Zhalgiris Vilnius	2:0	Pamir Dushanbe	(a.e.t.) (in Adler)
Daugava Riga	0:3	Zenit Leningrad	(in Fergana, February 23, 1984)

=== Round of 16 ===
The base game day was February 26, 1984

Chernomorets Odessa	1:0	Shakhter Donetsk
CSKA Moscow	4:2	Dinamo Kiev	(a.e.t.)
Dinamo Tbilisi	0:1	Dinamo Minsk
Dnepr Dnepropetrovsk	1:2	Dinamo Moscow
Metallist Kharkov	1:2	Torpedo Moscow
Spartak Moscow	1:0	SKA Rostov-na-Donu	(in Sochi)
Zhalgiris Vilnius	0:1	Fakel Voronezh	(in Adler)
Zenit Leningrad	3:3	Ararat Yerevan	(a.e.t.), (4–3 p) (February 27, 1984)

=== Quarter-finals ===
The base game day was March 2, 1984

Dinamo Minsk	1:0	CSKA Moscow	(in Sukhumi)
Dinamo Moscow	3:1	Chernomorets Odessa	(a.e.t.)
Torpedo Moscow	0:0	Zenit Leningrad	(a.e.t.), (6–7 p) (in Sochi, March 3, 1984)
Fakel Voronezh	2:0	Spartak Moscow (April 28, 1984)

=== Semi-finals ===
Zenit Leningrad	1:0	Fakel Voronezh	(a.e.t.) (June 6, 1984)
Dinamo Minsk	0:4	Dinamo Moscow	(June 7, 1984)

=== Final ===
24 June 1984

Dynamo Moscow	2 – 0 (a.e.t.)	Zenit Leningrad
Gazzaev 97'; Borodyuk 116'	Report

Lenin's Central Stadium, Moscow
Attendance: 43,500
Referee: Romualdas Juška (Vilnius)

== Sources ==
- Справочник-календарь «Футбол» - 1984 Москва, Центральный стадион им. В.И.Ленина, 1984 год (Handbook-calendar "Futbol"-1984, Tsentralnyi stadion imeni Lenina, Moscow 1984)
