= Sergei Mushtruyev =

Russian footballer

Sergey Mushtruyev
Personal information
- Full name: Sergey Viktorovich Mushtruyev
- Date of birth: 28 February 1967 (age 59)
- Place of birth: Ryazan, Russian SFSR
- Height: 1.76 m (5 ft 9 1/2 in)
- Position: Defender

Senior career*
Years	Team	Apps	(Gls)
1984–1985	FC Spartak Ryazan	57	(0)
1986–1988	FC Torpedo Moscow	16	(0)
1989–1992	FC Torpedo Ryazan	131	(6)
1993–1997	FC Lada Dimitrovgrad	131	(3)

Managerial career
- 1998–1999: FC Spartak Ryazan
- 2010–2011: FC Zvezda Ryazan
- * Club domestic league appearances and goals

Sergey Viktorovich Mushtruyev (Russian: Серге́й Ви́кторович Муштру́ев; born 28 February 1967) is a professional association football coach from Russia and a former Soviet player.

== Honours ==
- Soviet Cup winner: 1986
- Soviet Cup finalist: 1989
- Played 2 games in the 1986–87 European Cup Winners' Cup for FC Torpedo Moscow
