= Sergey Kuznetsov (footballer, born 1960) =

Russian footballer

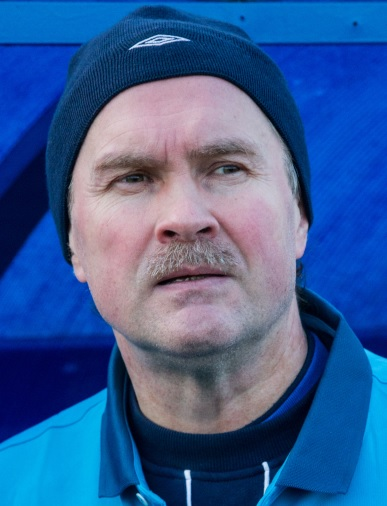

Personal information
- Full name: Sergey Ivanovich Kuznetsov
- Date of birth: 1 June 1960 (age 66)
- Place of birth: Leningrad, Russian SFSR
- Height: 1.86 m (6 ft 1 in)
- Position: Defender

Youth career
- Smena Leningrad

Senior career*
Years	Team	Apps	(Gls)
1979–1980	FC Dynamo Leningrad	77	(3)
1981	FC Dynamo Moscow	24	(0)
1982–1988	FC Zenit Leningrad	139	(5)
1989	FC Guria Lanchkhuti	23	(0)
1990	FC Lokomotiv Nizhny Novgorod	18	(0)
1990–1991	FC Zenit St. Petersburg	33	(2)
1991	FC Kirovets St. Petersburg	5	(1)
1992	Turun Toverit		
1992	FC Zenit St. Petersburg	9	(0)
1993	FC Asmaral Moscow	20	(0)
1994	Tevalte Tallinn	10	(0)
1995	Tianjin Locomotive		
1995	FC Yelimay Semipalatinsk	12	(0)

Managerial career
- 2004: FC Petrotrest St. Petersburg (assistant)
- * Club domestic league appearances and goals

Sergey Ivanovich Kuznetsov (Russian: Серге́й Иванович Кузнецов; born 1 June 1960) is a former Russian professional footballer.

== Club career ==
He made his professional debut in the Soviet First League in 1979 for FC Dynamo Leningrad. He played two games in the 1987–88 UEFA Cup with FC Zenit Leningrad.

== Honours ==
- Soviet Top League champion: 1984.
