= Valentyn Yelinskas =

Ukrainian footballer

Personal information
- Full name: Valentyn Vatslovasovych Yelinskas
- Date of birth: 15 August 1958
- Place of birth: Makiivka, Ukrainian SSR
- Date of death: 19 August 2008 (aged 50)
- Place of death: Donetsk, Ukraine
- Height: 1.82 m (6 ft 0 in)
- Position: Goalkeeper

Youth career
- SC Zarevo Makiivka
- Sports boarding school Luhansk

Senior career*
Years	Team	Apps	(Gls)
1976–1977	FC Burevestnik Ternopol	?	(?)
1978–1979	SKA Lvov	?	(?)
1979–1980	FC Podolie Khmelnitskiy	52	(1)
1980–1982	FC Chernomorets Odessa	41	(0)
1983–1987	FC Shakhter Donetsk	121	(0)
1988–1989	FC Zaria Voroshilovgrad	40	(0)
1990	FC Shakhter Donetsk	5	(0)
1990–1992	FC Azovets/Novator Mariupol	45	(0)

Managerial career
- ????–2006: FC Shakhtar-3 Donetsk (goalies coach)
- 2007–2008: FC Olimpik Donetsk (goalies coach)
- * Club domestic league appearances and goals

Valentyn Yelinskas (Ukrainian: Валентин Вацловасович Єлінскас; born 15 August 1958 in Makiivka) was a Ukrainian football goalkeeper and coach.

== Career ==
After his sports school in Luhansk, Yelinskas enrolled in institute of finances and economics in Ternopil where he studied for couple of years and played for the school team. After that he was drafted to the army, particularly the KGB signal regiment, but local team of the Carpathian Military District SKA Lvov managed to secure his services. About three months before demobilization, Yelinskas was transferred to Podollia in Khmelnytskyi for which he played for another couple of years. While playing in Podillia, he was finally noticed by the Soviet top clubs Chornomorets, Metalist, Dynamo. Yelinskas chose Chornomorets that was coached by the Russian manager Nikita Simonyan.

In Chornomorets during a training session Yelinskas received a concussion and was hospitalized where he contracted the "Botkin sickness" (Hepatitis A). Because of that did not play for almost a season. In 1982 there appeared an opportunity to move to Donetsk as its goalkeeper Yuriy Dehteryov was getting ready to retire, yet did not want to move if Shakhtar, which struggled during that time, would relegate out of the Soviet Top League. Chornomorets which at that time was managed by Viktor Prokopenko did not want to release Yelinskas, so he sneaked out and left for Shakhtar. For some time the Donetsk team was not even able to list him on its roster. Nonetheless, later everything settled and Yelinskas with Shakhtar won the 1983 Soviet Cup.

== Honours ==
- Soviet Cup
  - Winner: 1983
  - Finalist: 1984–1985
