= Aleksandr Zakharikov =

Russian footballer

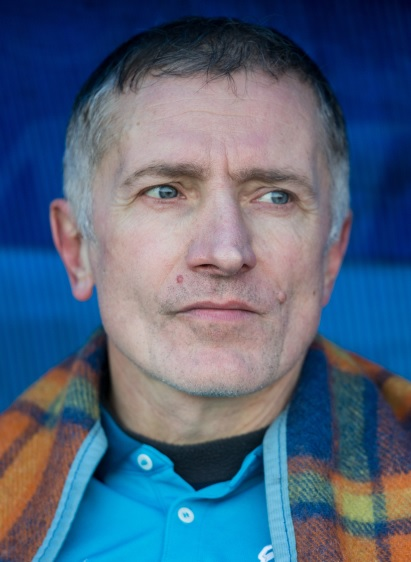

Personal information
- Full name: Aleksandr Mikhailovich Zakharikov
- Date of birth: 9 February 1961 (age 65)
- Place of birth: Leningrad, Russian SFSR
- Height: 1.74 m (5 ft 9 in)
- Positions: Defender; midfielder

Senior career*
Years	Team	Apps	(Gls)
1980–1985	FC Zenit Leningrad	41	(2)
1986–1988	FC Dynamo Stavropol	115	(10)
1989–1992	FC Zenit St. Petersburg	74	(2)
1992–1993	FC Smena-Saturn St. Petersburg	69	(5)
1994–1995	Shanghai Shenhua F.C.	40	(2)
1997	FC Dynamo St. Petersburg	27	(2)
- * Club domestic league appearances and goals

Aleksandr Mikhailovich Zakharikov (Russian: Александр Михайлович Захариков; born 9 February 1961) is a retired Russian professional footballer.

== Club career ==
He made his professional debut in the Soviet Top League in 1980 for FC Zenit Leningrad.

== Honours ==
- Soviet Top League champion: 1984.
- Soviet Top League bronze: 1980.
- Chinese Jia-A League Champion 1995.
