= 1984–85 Soviet Cup =

1984–85 Cup of USSR in Football
Кубок СССР

Tournament details
- Country: Soviet Union
- Dates: 31 July 1984 – 23 June 1985
- Teams: 50 ▲

Final positions
- Champions: Dinamo Kiev
- Runners-up: Shakhter Donetsk

The 1984–85 Soviet Cup was an association football cup competition of the Soviet Union. The winner of the competition, Dinamo Kiev qualified for the continental tournament.

== Competition overview ==
The competition was shifted to the European competition calendar (fall-spring) and was "desynchronized" with the rest of the Soviet Union football season (spring-fall). The shift in calendar and other changes of the tournament was announced in the main sports newspaper Sovetskiy Sport on June 20, 1984. 50 teams were allowed to participate: 18 from the Top league, 22 from the First and 10 from the Second. The weaker teams started out in July. The Top League began as usual from the Round of 32, but not all, only 14 of them. The rest, the privileged participants of the European cups (including Dnepr, Spartak, Dynamos Minsk and Moscow) were starting from the next stage, the Round of 16.

== Participating teams ==
Round of 16	Round of 32	2nd Preliminary	Enter in 1st Preliminary Round			
1984 Vysshaya Liga		1984 Pervaya Liga		1984 Vtoraya Liga		
4/18 teams	14/18 teams	8/22 teams	14/22 teams	10/162 teams		
✓ Spartak Moscow; ✓ Dnepr Dnepropetrovsk; ✓ Dinamo Minsk; ✓ Dinamo Moscow	✓ Zenit Leningrad; ✓ Chernomorets Odessa; ✓ Torpedo Moscow; ✓ Iberia Tbilisi; ✓ Kairat Alma-Ata; ✓ Zalgiris Vilnius; ✓ Dinamo Kiev; ✓ Ararat Erevan; ✓ Metallist Kharkov; ✓ Shakhter Donetsk; ✓ SKA Rostov-na-Donu; ✓ Neftchi Baku; ✓ CSKA Moscow (v); ✓ Pakhtakor Tashkent (v)	✓ Fakel Voronezh (^); ✓ FC Torpedo Kutaisi (^); ✓ Lokomotiv Moscow; ✓ Pamir Dushambe; ✓ Kuzbass Kemerovo; ✓ Dinamo Batumi; ✓ Iskra Smolensk; ✓ Nistru Kishenev	✓ SKA Karpaty Lvov; ✓ Kuban Krasnodar; ✓ Metallurg Zaporozhye; ✓ Daugava Riga; ✓ Guria Lanchkhuti; ✓ Zvezda Dzhizak; ✓ SKA Khabarovsk; ✓ Rotor Volgograd; ✓ Spartak Ordzhonikidze; ✓ Shinnik Yaroslavl; ✓ Kolos Nikopol; ✓ Zaria Voroshilovgrad (v); ✓ Tavria Simferopol (v); ✓ Irtysh Omsk (v)	✓ Svetotekhnika Saransk	✓ Metallurg Magnitogorsk	✓ Rostselmash Rostov-na-Donu
✓ Spartak Moscow; ✓ Dnepr Dnepropetrovsk; ✓ Dinamo Minsk; ✓ Dinamo Moscow	✓ Zenit Leningrad; ✓ Chernomorets Odessa; ✓ Torpedo Moscow; ✓ Iberia Tbilisi; ✓ Kairat Alma-Ata; ✓ Zalgiris Vilnius; ✓ Dinamo Kiev; ✓ Ararat Erevan; ✓ Metallist Kharkov; ✓ Shakhter Donetsk; ✓ SKA Rostov-na-Donu; ✓ Neftchi Baku; ✓ CSKA Moscow (v); ✓ Pakhtakor Tashkent (v)	✓ Fakel Voronezh (^); ✓ FC Torpedo Kutaisi (^); ✓ Lokomotiv Moscow; ✓ Pamir Dushambe; ✓ Kuzbass Kemerovo; ✓ Dinamo Batumi; ✓ Iskra Smolensk; ✓ Nistru Kishenev	✓ SKA Karpaty Lvov; ✓ Kuban Krasnodar; ✓ Metallurg Zaporozhye; ✓ Daugava Riga; ✓ Guria Lanchkhuti; ✓ Zvezda Dzhizak; ✓ SKA Khabarovsk; ✓ Rotor Volgograd; ✓ Spartak Ordzhonikidze; ✓ Shinnik Yaroslavl; ✓ Kolos Nikopol; ✓ Zaria Voroshilovgrad (v); ✓ Tavria Simferopol (v); ✓ Irtysh Omsk (v)	✓ Geolog Tyumen	✓ Dnepr Mogilev	✓ Niva Vinnitsa; ✓ Sudostroitel Nikolayev
✓ Spartak Moscow; ✓ Dnepr Dnepropetrovsk; ✓ Dinamo Minsk; ✓ Dinamo Moscow	✓ Zenit Leningrad; ✓ Chernomorets Odessa; ✓ Torpedo Moscow; ✓ Iberia Tbilisi; ✓ Kairat Alma-Ata; ✓ Zalgiris Vilnius; ✓ Dinamo Kiev; ✓ Ararat Erevan; ✓ Metallist Kharkov; ✓ Shakhter Donetsk; ✓ SKA Rostov-na-Donu; ✓ Neftchi Baku; ✓ CSKA Moscow (v); ✓ Pakhtakor Tashkent (v)	✓ Fakel Voronezh (^); ✓ FC Torpedo Kutaisi (^); ✓ Lokomotiv Moscow; ✓ Pamir Dushambe; ✓ Kuzbass Kemerovo; ✓ Dinamo Batumi; ✓ Iskra Smolensk; ✓ Nistru Kishenev	✓ SKA Karpaty Lvov; ✓ Kuban Krasnodar; ✓ Metallurg Zaporozhye; ✓ Daugava Riga; ✓ Guria Lanchkhuti; ✓ Zvezda Dzhizak; ✓ SKA Khabarovsk; ✓ Rotor Volgograd; ✓ Spartak Ordzhonikidze; ✓ Shinnik Yaroslavl; ✓ Kolos Nikopol; ✓ Zaria Voroshilovgrad (v); ✓ Tavria Simferopol (v); ✓ Irtysh Omsk (v)	✓ Dinamo Samarkand	✓ Tselinnik Tselinograd	✓ Kotaik Abovian (^)

Source: []

Notes

- The cup competition (fall–spring) was carried out of synchronization with the League season (spring–fall), markings next to teams (^, v) indicate promotions and relegations for the 1985 season.

== Competition schedule ==
=== First preliminary round ===
All games took place on July 31, 1984.

Dinamo Samarkand	4:1	Guria Lanchkhuti
Dnepr Mogilev	2:0	Daugava Riga
Geolog Tyumen	2:0	Zvezda Jizak
Kotaik Abovyan	3:2	Shinnik Yaroslavl	(a.e.t.)
Kuban Krasnodar	1:1	Pamir Dushanbe	(a.e.t.), (4–3 p)
Metallurg Magnitogorsk	3:0	Rotor Volgograd
Niva Vinnitsa	2:1	Metallurg Zaporozhie
Rostselmash Rostov-na-Donu	3:2	Zaria Voroshilovgrad
SKA Khabarovsk	3:0	Irtysh Omsk
Sudostroitel Nikolaev	3:2	SKA Karpaty Lvov
Svetotekhnika Saransk	1:5	Spartak Ordzhonikidze
Tselinnik Tselinograd	2:1	Tavria Simferopol	(a.e.t.)

=== Second preliminary round ===
All games took place on August 10 (or 20), 1984.

Dinamo Batumi	1:0	Dnepr Mogilev
Dinamo Samarkand	3:1	Fakel Voronezh
Iskra Smolensk	3:0	Metallurg Magnitogorsk
Geolog Tyumen	0:0	Tselinnik Tselinograd	(a.e.t.), (4–1 p)
Kotaik Abovyan	3:0	Kolos Nikopol
Kuzbass Kemerovo	1:0	Sudostroitel Nikolaev
Nistru Kishinev	2:1	Kuban Krasnodar
Niva Vinnitsa	3:0	Rostselmash Rostov-na-Donu
SKA Khabarovsk	6:1	Torpedo Kutaisi
Spartak Ordzhonikidze	2:0	Lokomotiv Moskva

=== Round of 32 ===
The base game day was September 17, 1984

Chernomorets Odessa	3:2	Neftchi Baku	(a.e.t.) (September 16, 1984)
Dinamo Batumi	1:0	Pahtakor Tashkent	(September 16, 1984)
Dinamo Samarkand	0:0	Zhalgiris Vilnius	(a.e.t.), (3–1 p) (September 16, 1984)
Kairat Alma-Aty	3:1	Spartak Ordzhonikidze	(September 16, 1984)
Zenit Leningrad	4:0	SKA Khabarovsk	(September 16, 1984)
Ararat Yerevan	3:1	Kuzbass Kemerovo
CSKA Moscow	2:0	Geolog Tyumen
Iskra Smolensk	2:2	Dinamo Tbilisi	(a.e.t.), (4–3 p)
Kotaik Abovyan	1:3	Shakhter Donetsk
Metallist Kharkov	0:1	Torpedo Moscow	(a.e.t.)
Nistru Kishinev	2:4	Dinamo Kiev
Niva Vinnitsa	2:1	SKA Rostov-na-Donu

=== Round of 16 ===
The base game day was October 28, 1984.

CSKA Moscow	3:0	Dinamo Batumi
Dinamo Kiev	1:1	Dinamo Moscow	(a.e.t.), (6–5 p)
Dinamo Minsk	2:1	Chernomorets Odessa	(a.e.t.)
Shakhter Donetsk	2:1	Ararat Yerevan
Torpedo Moscow	0:1	Dnepr Dnepropetrovsk
Spartak Moscow	0:3	Zenit Leningrad	(October 29, 1984)
Kairat Alma-Ata	1:0	Niva Vinnitsa	(November 12, 1984)
Dinamo Samarkand	0:1	Iskra Smolensk	(November 14, 1984)

=== Quarter-finals ===
The base game day was May 10, 1985

Dinamo Kiev	2:1	Kairat Alma-Ata
Iskra Smolensk	1:0	Dinamo Minsk
Shakhter Donetsk	2:1	Dnepr Dnepropetrovsk
Zenit Leningrad	2:0	CSKA Moscow

=== Semi-finals ===
Shakhter Donetsk	0:0	Zenit Leningrad	(a.e.t.), (4–2 p) (May 23, 1985)
Dinamo Kiev	3:0	Iskra Smolensk	(May 24, 1985)

=== Final ===
23 June 1985

Dynamo Kyiv	2 – 1	Shakhtar Donetsk
Demyanenko 56'; Blokhin 58'	Report	Morozov 68'

Lenin's Central Stadium, Moscow
Attendance: 53,200
Referee: Valeri Butenko (Moscow)
