= 1977 Soviet Cup =

1977 Cup of USSR in Football
Кубок СССР

Tournament details
- Country: Soviet Union
- Dates: March 27 – August 13
- Teams: 48

Final positions
- Champions: Dinamo Moscow
- Runners-up: Torpedo Moscow

The 1977 Soviet Cup was an association football cup competition of the Soviet Union. The winner of the competition, Dinamo Moscow qualified for the continental tournament.

== Participating teams ==
| Enter in Second round | Enter in First round | |
| Vysshaya Liga 16/16 teams | Pervaya Liga 20/20 teams | Vtoraya Liga 12/128 teams |
| ✓ Torpedo Moscow; ✓ Dinamo Kiev; ✓ Dinamo Tbilisi; ✓ Karpaty Lvov; ✓ Zenit Leningrad; ✓ Dinamo Moscow; ✓ CSKA Moscow; ✓ Lokomotiv Moscow; ✓ Chernomorets Odessa; ✓ Shakhter Donetsk; ✓ Krylya Sovetov Kuibyshev; ✓ Zaria Voroshilovgrad; ✓ Dnepr Dnepropetrovsk; ✓ Ararat Yerevan; ✓ Kairat Alma-Ata; ✓ Neftchi Baku | ✓ Spartak Moscow; ✓ Dinamo Minsk; ✓ Pakhtakor Tashkent; ✓ Tavriya Simferopol; ✓ Nistru Kishinev; ✓ Zvezda Perm; ✓ Torpedo Kutaisi; ✓ Kuzbass Kemerovo; ✓ Kolkhozchi Ashgabat; ✓ Shinnik Yaroslavl; ✓ Pamir Dushanbe; ✓ SKA Rostov-na-Donu; ✓ Metallurg Zaporozhye; ✓ Spartak Ivano-Frankovsk; ✓ Spartak Ordzhonikidze; ✓ Terek Grozny; ✓ Rubin Kazan; ✓ Uralmash Sverdlovsk; ✓ Krivbass Krivoi Rog; ✓ Dinamo Leningrad | ✓ Guria Lanchkhuti; ✓ SKA Khabarovsk; ✓ Iskra Smolensk; ✓ Mashuk Pyatigorsk; ✓ Dinamo Brest; ✓ Amur Blagoveschensk; ✓ Rostselmash Rostov-na-Donu; ✓ Fakel Voronezh; ✓ SKA Kiev; ✓ Neftianik Fergana; ✓ Yangier; ✓ Metallist Kharkov |

Source: []

== Competition schedule ==
=== First round ===
[Mar 27] 
GURIA Lanchkhuti            4-1  Shinnik Yaroslavl 
  [B.Mchedlishvili 8, 10, 35 pen, V.Troyan 80 - Nikolai Vikharev 82. Att: 6,000] 
Krivbass Krivoi Rog         1-2  SKA Khabarovsk 
  [Oleg Chumak – Lev Kutashov, Anatoliy Olkhovik. Att: 20,000] 
Kuzbass Kemerovo            0-1  ISKRA Smolensk         [in Andizhan] 
  [Jemal Silagadze. Att: 6,000] 
Mashuk Pyatigorsk           1-2  PAMIR Dushanbe         [aet] 
  [Alexandr Sabinin - Mansur Karimov, Valeriy Tursunov. Att: 4,000] 
METALLURG Zaporozhye        2-1  Dinamo Brest 
  [Vitaliy Denezh 59, Alexandr Polishchuk 84 pen – Alexandr Razumovich 62. Att: 20,000] 
NISTRU Kishinev             2-0  Dinamo Leningrad       [aet] 
  [Viktor Tomashevskiy, Igor Nadein. Att: 15,000] 
PAHTAKOR Tashkent           6-0  Amur Blagoveshchensk 
  [Oleg Yeremeyev-2, Alexandr Korchonov, Viktor Churkin, Mikhail An pen, Tulyagan Isakov. Att: 25,000] 
RostSelMash Rostov-na-Donu  0-1  FAKEL Voronezh 
  [Valeriy Abramov 3. Att: 15,000] 
Rubin Kazan                 0-2  SPARTAK Moskva        [in Sochi] 
  [Mikhail Bulgakov 18 pen, Vadim Pavlenko 22. Att: 4,000] 
SKA Kiev                    2-0  Neftyanik Fergana 
  [Alexandr Dovbiy, Nikolai Pinchuk. Att: 9,000] 
SPARTAK Ivano-Frankovsk     2-1  Kolhozchi Ashkhabad   [aet] 
  [Alexandr Martynenko ?, 102 – Sergei Fomin 75. Att: 10,000] 
Spartak Orjonikidze         1-1  DINAMO Minsk          [pen 4-5] 
  [Georgiy Kaishauri 115 – Yuriy Kurnenin 119. Att: 12,000] 
TEREK Grozny                3-2  Zvezda Perm           [aet] 
  [Vitaliy Yakushkin-2, Anzor Chikhladze – Anatoliy Malyarov, Sergei Grigorovich. Att: 5,000] 
Torpedo Kutaisi             0-1  METALLIST Kharkov 
  [Stanislav Bernikov 36. Att: 15,000] 
UralMash Sverdlovsk         0-2  SKA Rostov-na-Donu    [in Fergana] 
  [Wilhelm Tellinger 12, Viktor Bondarenko 60 pen. Att: 2,000] 
YANGIYER                    1-1  Tavria Simferopol     [pen 6-5] 
  [I.Budantsev 120 – Valentin Prilepskiy 105. Att: 12,000]

=== Second round ===
[Apr 10] 
DINAMO Minsk                5-0  Neftchi Baku 
  [Yuriy Kurnenin 6, Alexandr Prokopenko 41, Anatoliy Bogovik 43, Anatoliy Baidachny 45, Pyotr Vasilevskiy 89. Att: 30,000] 
Fakel Voronezh              2-3  KAYRAT Alma-Ata 
  [Givi Anfimiadi 33, Vladimir Proskurin 47 – Viktor Zarechny 48, Sergei Lukashov 49, Sultan Abenov 75. Att: 35,000] 
Guria Lanckhuti             0-1  CSKA Moskva 
  [Yuriy Panteleyev 88. Att: 16,000] 
ISKRA Smolensk              3-1  Krylya Sovetov Kuibyshev 
  [Jemal Silagadze 5, Yuriy Kolesnikov 64, Viktor Davydov 68 – Viktor Kapayev 67. Att: 15,000] 
Metallist Kharkov           2-2  KARPATY Lvov          [pen 2-4] 
  [Roman Davyd 22, 34 – Vladimir Danilyuk 62, Fyodor Chorba 75 pen. Att: 40,000] 
Metallurg Zapoorozhye       0-1  ZENIT Leningrad 
  [Alexandr Markin 42. Att: 22,000] 
Nistru Kishinev             0-1  SHAKHTYOR Donetsk     [aet] 
  [Yuriy Dudinskiy 96. Att: 20,000] 
PAHTAKOR Tashkent           1-0  Dinamo Tbilisi 
  [Mikhail An 79 pen. Att: 25,000] 
Pamir Dushanbe              0-1  TORPEDO Moskva        [aet] 
  [Vladimir Sakharov 103. Att: 22,000] 
SKA Khabarovsk              0-2  DINAMO Kiev           [in Sochi] 
  [Sergei Kuznetsov 74, Oleg Blokhin 87. Att: 4,000] 
SKA Kiev                    2-0  Chernomorets Odessa 
  [Nikolai Pinchuk 16, Alexandr Dovbiy 29. Att: 11,000] 
SKA Rostov-na-Donu          0-2  ZARYA Voroshilovgrad 
  [Yuriy Rabochiy 74, Anatoliy Kuksov 88. Att: 20,000] 
SPARTAK Ivano-Frankovsk     1-1  Ararat Yerevan        [pen 5-4] 
  [Alexandr Martynenko 56 - Andranik Khachatryan 20. Att: 20,000] 
SPARTAK Moskva              3-1  Lokomotiv Moskva      [in Sochi] 
  [Georgiy Yartsev 28, Mikhail Bulgakov 44, 72 pen – Alexei Ovchinnikov 44 pen. Att: 4,000] 
Terek Grozny                1-2  DNEPR Dnepropetrovsk 
  [Anatoliy Sinko 76 – Nikolai Samoilenko 35, Anatoliy Shelest 50. Att: 17,000] 
Yangiyer                    0-1  DINAMO Moskva 
  [Mikhail Gershkovich 25. Att: 13,000]

=== Third round ===
[Jun 17] 
CSKA Moskva                 1-2  SKA Kiev 
  [Boris Kopeikin 36 – Alexandr Dovbiy 18, Nikolai Pinchuk 38 pen. Att: 15,000] 
Iskra Smolensk              1-2  PAHTAKOR Tashkent 
  [Jemal Silagadze 48 – Yuriy Basov 56, Mikhail An 80. Att: 15,000] 
[Jun 18] 
DINAMO Kiev                 2-0  Spartak Ivano-Frankovsk 
  [Alexandr Berezhnoi 61, Oleg Blokhin 69. Att: 8,000] 
Dnepr Dnepropetrovsk        1-3  ZARYA Voroshilovgrad 
  [Vladimir Kutsev 56 - Alexandr Ignatenko 45, Sergei Andreyev 62, Vyacheslav Semyonov 67. Att: 12,000] 
Kayrat Alma-Ata             0-2  DINAMO Moskva 
  [Andrei Yakubik 11, Alexandr Maksimenkov 58. Att: 15,000] 
SHAKHTYOR Donetsk           1-0  Dinamo Minsk 
  [Vladimir Safonov 30. Att: 20,000] 
TORPEDO Moskva              0-0  Spartak Moskva        [pen 3-1] 
  [Att: 45,000] 
ZENIT Leningrad             2-0  Karpaty Lvov 
  [Vyacheslav Melnikov 53, 73. Att: 15,000]

=== Quarterfinals ===
[Jul 9] 
TORPEDO Moskva          1-0  SKA Kiev 
  [Vladimir Sakharov 58 pen. Att: 18,000] 
[Jul 10] 
DINAMO Moskva           3-0  Dinamo Kiev 
  [Oleg Dolmatov 48, Vladimir Kazachonok 55, 74. Att: 35,000] 
ZARYA Voroshilovgrad    1-0  Pahtakor Tashkent 
  [Anatoliy Kuksov 77. Att: 13,000] 
ZENIT Leningrad         1-1  Shakhtyor Donetsk     [pen 4-3] 
  [Vladimir Klementyev 79 – Vitaliy Starukhin 57. Att: 45,000]

=== Semifinals ===
[Jul 31] 
Zarya Voroshilovgrad    0-1  TORPEDO Moskva 
  [Yevgeniy Khrabrostin 79. Att: 27,000] 
[Aug 1] 
DINAMO Moskva           2-1  Zenit Leningrad 
  [Alexandr Minayev 49, Alexandr Makhovikov 71 – Alexandr Markin 81. Att: 35,000]

==== Final ====
13 August 1977

| Dinamo Moscow | 1 – 0 | Torpedo Moscow |
|---|---|---|
| Kazachonok 17' | Report |

Lenin's Central Stadium, Moscow
Attendance: 45,000
Referee: Vladimir Rudnev (Moscow)
