= 1983 Soviet Cup =

1983 Cup of USSR in Football
Кубок СССР

Tournament details
- Country: Soviet Union
- Dates: February 19 – May 8
- Teams: 40

Final positions
- Champions: Shakhter Donetsk
- Runners-up: Metallist Kharkov

The 1983 Soviet Cup was an association football cup competition of the Soviet Union. The winner of the competition, Shakhter Donetsk qualified for the continental tournament.

== Competition overview ==
Competitions, as in previous years, from the first round are held according to the elimination system.

40 teams were participating: 18 from the Top league and 22 from the First league. 22 teams of the First league begin the competition from the first round, and 17 teams of the Top league from the Round of 32. The football team of Dynamo Kyiv, that continued to compete in the European Champions Cup, were starting from the quarterfinals.

The meeting locations were determined by taking into account the number of visits and game hosting for each team. In case of equality of hosting and visiting, the location of the next game was determined by a draw of lots.

If the game, including the final, would end in a draw, extra time was assigned (two halves of 15 minutes each). If extra time did not reveal the strongest team, the winner was determined by penalty kicks in accordance with FIFA regulations.

In games for the Soviet Cup, three players are allowed to be substituted during the game.

The final was held on May 9, Victory Day, at the Central Stadium named after V.I. Lenin in Moscow.

== Participating teams ==
Enter in Second Preliminary Round	Enter in First Preliminary Round
1983 Vysshaya Liga; 17/18 teams	1983 Pervaya Liga; 22/22 teams
✓ Dnepr Dnepropetrovsk; ✓ Spartak Moscow; ✓ Dinamo Minsk; ✓ Zenit Leningrad; ✓ Zalgiris Vilnius; ✓ Torpedo Moscow; ✓ Chernomorets Odessa; ✓ Shakhter Donetsk; ✓ Pakhtakor Tashkent; ✓ Metallist Kharkov; ✓ CSKA Moscow; ✓ Neftchi Baku; ✓ Ararat Erevan; ✓ Dinamo Moscow; ✓ Dinamo Tbilisi; ✓ FC Torpedo Kutaisi; ✓ Nistru Kishenev	✓ Kairat Alma-Ata; ✓ SKA Rostov-na-Donu; ✓ Fakel Voronezh; ✓ Rotor Volgograd; ✓ Metallurg Zaporozhye; ✓ Kolos Nikopol; ✓ Tavria Simferopol; ✓ Kuban Krasnodar; ✓ Guria Lanchkhuti; ✓ Kuzbass Kemerovo; ✓ SKA Karpaty Lvov; ✓ Pamir Dushanbe; ✓ Zaria Voroshilovgrad; ✓ Daugava Riga; ✓ Lokomotiv Moscow; ✓ Zvezda Dzhizak; ✓ Iskra Smolensk; ✓ Shinnik Yaroslavl; ✓ SKA Khabarovsk; ✓ Dnepr Mogilev; ✓ Tekstilschik Ivanovo; ✓ Dinamo Kirov

Source: []

Notes

- Dinamo Kiev received bye all the way through the quarterfinals.

== Competition schedule ==
=== First preliminary round ===
All games took place on February 19, 1983.

Daugava Riga	1:2	Dinamo Kirov
Guria Lanchkhuti	0:0	Fakel Voronezh	(a.e.t.), (6–5 p)
Iskra Smolensk	2:0	Zaria Voroshilovgrad	(in Moscow)
Kairat Alma-Ata	2:0	Kuzbass Kemerovo
Kolos Nikopol	1:0	Tekstilschik Ivanovo
Kuban Krasnodar	3:0	Dnepr Mogilev
Pamir Dushanbe	0:1	Rotor Volgograd	(a.e.t.)
Tavria Simferopol	1:0	SKA Karpaty Lvov
Zvezda Dzhizzak	0:1	Lokomotiv Moscow
SKA Khabarovsk	+:–	Shinnik Yaroslavl
SKA Rostov-na-Donu	+:–	Metallurg Zaporozhie

=== Second preliminary round ===
The base game day was February 24, 1983

Chernomorets Odessa	1:0	Kolos Nikopol
Dinamo Kirov	0:0	Ararat Yerevan	(a.e.t.), (4–5 p) (in Sochi)
Dnepr Dnepropetrovsk	2:0	Lokomotiv Moscow
Metallist Kharkov	0:0	Kairat Alma-Ata	(a.e.t.), (6–5 p) (in Sochi)
Neftchi Baku	1:1	CSKA Moscow	(a.e.t.), (3–4 p)
Pakhtakor Tashkent	2:1	SKA Khabarovsk
Rotor Volgograd	1:0	Dinamo Tbilisi
SKA Rostov-na-Donu	3:2	Dinamo Minsk
Spartak Moscow	3:2	Tavria Simferopol	(a.e.t.)
Torpedo Moscow	1:0	Guria Lanchkhuti	(in Adler)
Dinamo Moscow	1:0	Kuban Krasnodar	(February 25, 1983)
Nistru Kishinev	0:2	Torpedo Kutaisi	(February 25, 1983)
Shakhter Donetsk	3:0	Zhalgiris Vilnius	(in Sochi, February 25, 1983)
Zenit Leningrad	3:0	Iskra Smolensk	(February 25, 1983)

=== Round of 16 ===
The base game day was March 3, 1983

Ararat Yerevan	2:4	Metallist Kharkov	(in Oktemberyan)
Chernomorets Odessa	0:2	Zenit Leningrad
CSKA Moscow	2:1	SKA Rostov-na-Donu
Dnepr Dnepropetrovsk	3:1	Torpedo Moscow
Pakhtakor Tashkent	0:1	Dinamo Moscow
Spartak Moscow	2:3	Shakhter Donetsk	(a.e.t.)
Torpedo Kutaisi	3:2	Rotor Volgograd	(a.e.t.) (in Samtredia)

=== Quarterfinals ===
The base game day was March 11, 1983

Metallist Kharkov	0:0	Torpedo Kutaisi	(a.e.t.), (4–3 p)
Zenit Leningrad	3:1	Dinamo Kiev
CSKA Moscow	2:1	Dnepr Dnepropetrovsk	(March 12, 1983)
Dinamo Moscow	1:3	Shakhter Donetsk	(a.e.t.) (in Tashkent, March 12, 1983)

=== Semifinals ===
The base game day was March 19, 1983

CSKA Moscow	0:1	Metallist Kharkov	(a.e.t.)
Shakhter Donetsk	1:1	Zenit Leningrad	(a.e.t.), (4–2 p)

=== Final ===
8 May 1983

Shakhtar Donetsk	1 – 0	Metalist Kharkiv
Yashchenko 23'	Report

Lenin's Central Stadium, Moscow
Attendance: 30,000
Referee: Valeri Butenko (Moscow)
