= Volodymyr Parkhomenko =

Ukrainian footballer and coach

Personal information
- Full name: Volodymyr Ivanovych Parkhomenko
- Date of birth: 17 October 1957 (age 69)
- Place of birth: Zhdanov, Ukrainian SSR, Soviet Union
- Height: 1.81 m (5 ft 11 1/2 in)
- Position: Defender

Senior career*
| Years | Team | Apps | (Gls) |
| 1975 | FC Lokomotiv Zhdanov | 2 | (0) |
| 1978–1979 | FC Dinamo Leningrad | 12 | (0) |
| 1980–1982 | FC Dinamo Kirov | 82 | (1) |
| 1983–1988 | FC Shakhter Donetsk | 128 | (4) |
| 1988 | FC Guria Lanchkhuti | 32 | (0) |
| 1989 | FC Metallurg Zaporozhie | 13 | (0) |
| 1989 | FC Lokomotiv Gorky | 26 | (3) |
| 1990 | FC Krivbass Krivoi Rog | 18 | (0) |
| 1990 | FC Priborist Mukachevo | ? | (?) |
| 1991–1992 | Diósgyőri VTK | 15 | (1) |
| 1992 | Egri FC | 8 | (0) |
| 1993–1994 | FC Bazhanovets Makiivka | 15 | (0) |
| 1994 | FC Aton Donetsk | 11 | (0) |
| 1994–1995 | Egri FC | ? | (?) |
| 1995 | FC Aton Donetsk | 1 | (0) |

Managerial career
- 2001: FC Mashynobudivnyk Druzhkivka
- 2002: FC Sumy
- 2003–2004: FC Arsenal Kharkiv (assistant)
- 2005: FC Spartak Sumy
- 2012: FC Elior Makiivka
- 2015–2016: FC Vostok Donetsk
- 2017: FC Oplot Donbassa Donetsk (assistant)
- * Club domestic league appearances and goals

Volodymyr Parkhomenko (Ukrainian: Володимир Іванович Пархоменко; born 17 October 1957) is a Ukrainian football coach and a former player.

Since the Russian occupation of eastern Ukraine, Parkhomenko has been coaching football teams on occupied territories.
