= Valeriy Hoshkoderya =

Ukrainian football player

Personal information
- Full name: Valeriy Anatoliyovych Hoshkoderya
- Date of birth: 1 November 1959
- Place of birth: Khrushchev, Ukrainian SSR
- Date of death: 13 March 2013 (aged 53)
- Place of death: Donetsk, Ukraine
- Position: Defender

Senior career*
Years	Team	Apps	(Gls)
1977–1980	Zirka Kirovohrad	91	(5)
1981	Shakhtar Donetsk	27	(1)
1982–1983	SKA Rostov-na-Donu	56	(0)
1984–1990	Shakhtar Donetsk	163	(3)
1990–1992	Stal Stalowa Wola	28	(1)
1993–1995	Bałtyk Gdynia	107	(0)
1995–1996	Shakhtar Makiivka	28	(1)
Total		500	(11)

Managerial career
- 1997: Shakhtar Makiivka (assistant)
- 1997–1998: Metalurh Donetsk (assistant)
- 2004: SKA Khabarovsk (assistant)
- 2007: Vorskla Poltava (assistant)
- * Club domestic league appearances and goals

Valeriy Hoshkoderya (Ukrainian: Валерій Анатолійович Гошкодеря; 1 November 1959 – 13 March 2013) was a Soviet–Ukrainian professional footballer and manager.

Valeriy had a son, Vitaliy Hoshkoderya.
