= Oleksandr Sopko =

Ukrainian footballer

Personal information
- Full name: Oleksandr Oleksandrovych Sopko
- Date of birth: 11 May 1958 (age 68)
- Place of birth: Kryvyi Rih, Dnipropetrovsk Oblast, Ukrainian SSR
- Height: 1.80 m (5 ft 11 in)
- Position: Defender

Youth career
- Kryvbas academy

Senior career*
Years	Team	Apps	(Gls)
1975	Kryvbas Kryvyi Rih	9	(1)
1976–1980	Dynamo Kyiv	1	(0)
1981–1990	Shakhtar Donetsk	270	(5)
1991–1993	Lokomotíva Košice		
1993–1994	Zemplín Michalovce		

International career
1977	USSR youth		

Managerial career
- 1994–1997: Zemplín Michalovce
Medal record
Men's football
Representing Soviet Union
FIFA U-20 World Cup
Winner	1977 Tunisia
- * Club domestic league appearances and goals

Oleksandr Oleksandrovych Sopko (Ukrainian: Олександр Олександрович Сопко; born 11 May 1958 in Kryvyi Rih) is a retired Ukrainian football defender.

He capped for USSR youth team at 1977 FIFA World Youth Championship.

== Honours ==
Shakhtar Donetsk

- Soviet Cup: 1983

Soviet Union youth

- FIFA World Youth Championship: 1977
