= Viktor Hrachov =

Ukrainian footballer (born 1956)

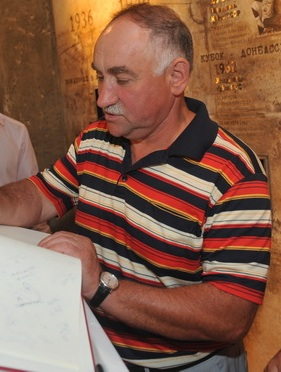

Personal information
- Full name: Viktor Oleksandrovych Hrachov
- Date of birth: 17 September 1956 (age 70)
- Place of birth: Dzerzhynsk, Ukrainian SSR
- Height: 1.73 m (5 ft 8 in)
- Position: Right winger

Senior career*
Years	Team	Apps	(Gls)
1975	Spartak Oryol	14	(0)
1976–1978	Kolhozchi Ashkhabad	104	(23)
1979	Torpedo Moscow	12	(0)
1980–1981	Shakhtar Donetsk	49	(16)
1982	Spartak Moscow	5	(1)
1982–1990	Shakhtar Donetsk	227	(49)
1990–1991	Debrecen	16	(3)
1991–1993	Budapesti VSC	39	(10)
1993–1994	Debrecen	25	(5)
1994–1995	Shakhtar Donetsk	6	(0)

International career
1984	USSR	1	(0)

Managerial career
- Shakhtar-2
- SC Tavriya Simferopol
- * Club domestic league appearances and goals

Viktor Oleksandrovych Hrachov (Russian: Виктор Александрович Грачёв; born 17 September 1956) is a Ukrainian former football player and manager. He played as a right winger.

== International career ==
Hrachov played his only game for USSR on 15 May 1984 in a friendly against Finland.

== Career statistics ==
=== Club ===
Appearances and goals by club, season and competition
Club	Season	League		Cup		Europe		Super Cup		Total	
Club	Season	Apps	Goals	Apps	Goals	Apps	Goals	Apps	Goals	Apps	Goals
Spartak Oryol	1975	14	0							14	0
Kolhozchi Ashkhabad	1976	34	7	1	0					35	7
Kolhozchi Ashkhabad	1977	35	8	1	0					36	8
Kolhozchi Ashkhabad	1978	35	8	2	1					37	9
Kolhozchi Ashkhabad	Total	104	23	4	1					108	24
Torpedo Moscow	1979	12	0	5	1					17	1
Shakhtar Donetsk	1980	16	4	8	0					24	4
Shakhtar Donetsk	1981	33	12	5	1			1	0	39	13
Shakhtar Donetsk	Total	49	16	13	1			1	0	63	17
Spartak Moscow	1982	5	1	2	0					7	1
Shakhtar Donetsk	1982	23	5							23	5
Shakhtar Donetsk	1983	30	8	4	3	4	4			38	15
Shakhtar Donetsk	1984	31	8	3	0	2	1	1	0	37	9
Shakhtar Donetsk	1985	30	12	3	0					33	12
Shakhtar Donetsk	1986	23	7	4	1			1	0	28	8
Shakhtar Donetsk	1987	23	3	2	1					25	4
Shakhtar Donetsk	1988	20	1	2	0					22	1
Shakhtar Donetsk	1989	24	4	3	1					27	5
Shakhtar Donetsk	1990	23	1	2	0					25	1
Shakhtar Donetsk	Total	227	49	23	6	6	5	2	0	258	60
Debrecen	1990–91	16	3	1	0					17	3
Budapesti VSC	1991–92	25	6	1	0					26	6
Budapesti VSC	1992–93	14	4	1	0					15	4
Budapesti VSC	Total	39	10	2	0					41	10
Debrecen	1993–94	25	6	2	0					27	6
Shakhtar Donetsk	1994–95	6	0	4	3					10	3
Career total		497	108	56	12	6	5	3	0	562	125

== Honours ==
Shakhtar

- Soviet Cup winner: 1980, 1983
- IFA Shield: 1985

Individual

- UEFA Cup Winners' Cup top scorer: 1983–84
