= Valeriy Rudakov =

Soviet footballer and coach (born 1955)

Personal information
- Full name: Valeriy Viktorovych Rudakov
- Date of birth: 30 June 1955 (age 71)
- Place of birth: Stalino, Ukrainian SSR
- Height: 1.79 m (5 ft 10 1/2 in)
- Position: Midfielder

Youth career
- 1967–1973: FC Shakhtar Donetsk

Senior career*
Years	Team	Apps	(Gls)
1974–1986	FC Shakhtar Donetsk	277	(9)
1987	FC Kolos Nikopol	26	(0)
1989	FC Novator Zhdanov	48	(2)

International career
1972–1973	Soviet Union-19	5	(0)

Managerial career
- 1989: FC Novator Zhdanov (assistant)
- 1990–1991: FC Antratsyt (assistant)
- 1992–1995: FC Shakhtar Donetsk (assistant)
- 1995–1996: FC Shakhtar Donetsk
- 1996–1999: FC Shakhtar-3 Donetsk (assistant)
- 1999–2002: SC Mykolaiv (assistant)
- 2003: FC Shakhtar-3 Donetsk (assistant)
- 2004–2006: FC Shakhtar Donetsk Reserves
- 2007: FC Shakhtar-3 Donetsk (assistant)
- 2008–2009: FC Shakhtar-3 Donetsk
- 2013–2015: FC Shakhtar-3 Donetsk
- * Club domestic league appearances and goals

Valeriy Rudakov (Ukrainian: Валерій Вікторович Рудаков; born 30 June 1955), is a Soviet player and coach from Ukraine.
