= Oleksiy Varnavsky =

Soviet association football player (1957–2008)

Personal information
- Full name: Oleksiy Dmytrovych Varnavsky
- Date of birth: 6 April 1957
- Place of birth: Makiivka, Ukrainian SSR, Soviet Union
- Date of death: 28 February 2008 (aged 50)
- Place of death: Berdiansk, Ukraine
- Height: 1.77 m (5 ft 10 in)
- Position: Midfielder

Youth career
- SC Zarevo Makiivka

Senior career*
Years	Team	Apps	(Gls)
1974	FC Kholodna Balka Makiivka	?	(?)
1974	FC Shakhtar Donetsk	0	(0)
1975–1977	SC Chernigov/SKA Kiev	52	(7)
1977–1986	FC Shakhtar Donetsk	222	(11)
1987	FC Guria Lanchkhuti	7	(1)
1987–1989	FC Novator Mariupol	83	(37)
1989	FC Sotsdonbasovets Donetsk	?	(?)
1990	FC Torpedo Zaporizhia	33	(2)
1991	FC Hirnyk Khartsyzk	?	(12)
1992	FC Zirka Kirovohrad	6	(1)
1993–1994	FC Kristall Dyatkovo	40	(3)

Managerial career
- 1992: FC Zirka Kirovohrad (assistant)
- 1993: FC Antratsyt
- 1993–1994: FC Kristall Dyatkovo (assistant)
- 1995: FC Kristall Dyatkovo
- 2000: FC Shakhtar-3 Donetsk
- 2001–2002: FC Zorya Luhansk (assistant)
- * Club domestic league appearances and goals

Oleksiy Varnavsky (Ukrainian: Олексій Дмитрович Варнавський; born 6 April 1957) was a Ukrainian football coach and a player.
