= 1984 Soviet First League =

Soviet First League
- Season: 1984

The 1984 Soviet First League was the fourteenth season of the Soviet First League and the 44th season of the Soviet second tier league competition.

== Final standings ==
Pos	Team	Pld	W	D	L	GF	GA	GD	Pts	Promotion or relegation
1	(Russian Soviet Federative Socialist Republic) Fakel Voronezh (C, P)	42	25	7	10	61	30	+31	57	Promotion to Top League
2	(Georgian Soviet Socialist Republic) Torpedo Kutaisi (P)	42	23	9	10	76	55	+21	55	Promotion to Top League
3	(Ukrainian Soviet Socialist Republic) SKA Karpaty Lvov	42	20	9	13	63	44	+19	49	
4	(Russian Soviet Federative Socialist Republic) Kuban Krasnodar	42	20	9	13	60	41	+19	49	
5	(Ukrainian Soviet Socialist Republic) Metallurg Zaporozhia	42	18	12	12	57	43	+14	48	
6	(Russian Soviet Federative Socialist Republic) Lokomotiv Moscow	42	17	13	12	44	37	+7	46 (Note: There was a draw limit for the draws earned, 12. Only twelve draws earn a point, in contrast, over the limit draws earn no points.)	
7	(Latvian Soviet Socialist Republic) Daugava Riga	42	16	14	12	65	50	+15	44	
8	(Tajik Soviet Socialist Republic) Pamir Dushanbe	42	16	11	15	51	44	+7	43	
9	(Russian Soviet Federative Socialist Republic) Kuzbass Kemerovo	42	17	8	17	56	51	+5	42	
10	(Georgian Soviet Socialist Republic) Guria Lanchkhuti	42	16	10	16	49	52	−3	42	
11	(Georgian Soviet Socialist Republic) Dinamo Batumi	42	16	8	18	58	67	−9	40	
12	(Russian Soviet Federative Socialist Republic) Iskra Smolensk	42	15	10	17	44	47	−3	40	
13	(Uzbek Soviet Socialist Republic) Zvezda Dzhizak	42	17	5	20	51	64	−13	39	
14	(Russian Soviet Federative Socialist Republic) SKA Khabarovsk	42	14	11	17	55	59	−4	39	
15	(Russian Soviet Federative Socialist Republic) Rotor Volgograd	42	15	8	19	63	78	−15	38	
16	(Russian Soviet Federative Socialist Republic) Spartak Ordjonikidze	42	15	8	19	42	51	−9	38	
17	(Russian Soviet Federative Socialist Republic) Shinnik Yaroslavl	42	13	12	17	49	50	−1	38	
18	(Moldavian Soviet Socialist Republic) Nistru Kishinev	42	13	12	17	45	58	−13	38	
19	(Ukrainian Soviet Socialist Republic) Kolos Nikopol	42	13	12	17	50	59	−9	38	
20	(Ukrainian Soviet Socialist Republic) Zarya Voroshilovgrad (R)	42	13	11	18	54	61	−7	37	Relegation to Second League
21	(Ukrainian Soviet Socialist Republic) Tavria Simferopol (R)	42	12	11	19	43	58	−15	35	Relegation to Second League
22	(Russian Soviet Federative Socialist Republic) Irtysh Omsk (R)	42	8	10	24	35	72	−37	26	Relegation to Second League

Source: rsssf.com
(C) Champions; (P) Promoted; (R) Relegated

== Top scorers ==
#	Player	Club	Goals
1	Revaz Chelebadze	Dinamo Batumi	27 (12)
2	Otar Korgalidze	Torpedo Kutaisi	24 (11)
3	Ravil Sharipov	Metallurg Zaporozhye	20 (5)
4	Viktor Vasilyev	Rotor Volgograd	19 (2)
5	Viktor Pimushin	Fakel Voronezh	18
6	Merab Megreladze	Torpedo Kutaisi	17
6	Volodymyr Naumenko	Tavriya Simferopol	17 (7)
8	Aleksandr Antonov	Kuzbass Kemerevo	16 (1)
8	Vyacheslav Lendel	SKA Karpaty Lvov	16 (1)

== Number of teams by union republic ==
Rank	Union republic	Number of teams	Club(s)
1	RSFSR	10	Fakel Voronezh, Kuban Krasnodar, Lokomotiv Moscow, Kuzbass Kemerovo, Iskra Smolensk, SKA Khabarovsk, Rotor Volgograd, Spartak Ordzhonikidze, Shinnik Yaroslavl, Irtysh Omsk
2	Ukrainian SSR	5	SKA Karpaty Lvov, Kolos Nikopol, Metallurg Zaporozhye, Zaria Voroshilovgrad, Tavria Simferopol
3	Georgian SSR	3	Guria Lanchkhuti, Dinamo Batumi, Torpedo Kutaisi
4	Latvian SSR	1	Daugava Riga
4	Tajik SSR	1	Pamir Dushanbe
4	Uzbek SSR	1	Zvezda Dzhizak
4	Moldavian SSR	1	Nistru Kishinev
