= 1984 Soviet Second League =

Second League
- Season: 1984

1984 Soviet Second League was a Soviet competition in the Soviet Second League.

== Qualifying groups ==
=== Group I [Russian Federation] ===
Pos	Team	Pld	W	D	L	GF	GA	GD	Pts
1	Zorkiy Krasnogorsk	32	21	4	7	73	21	+52	46
2	Zarya Kaluga	32	20	4	8	64	24	+40	44
3	Arsenal Tula (Note: TOZ Tula changed name to Arsenal.)	32	19	5	8	56	29	+27	43
4	Znamya Truda Orekhovo-Zuyevo	32	17	9	6	66	28	+38	43
5	Stroitel Cherepovets	32	18	6	8	49	33	+16	42
6	Spartak Kostroma	32	15	10	7	52	33	+19	40
7	Volga Kalinin	32	16	6	10	39	40	−1	38
8	Svetotekhnika Saransk	32	14	9	9	51	35	+16	37
9	Textilshchik Ivanovo	32	16	4	12	59	36	+23	36
10	Dinamo Vologda	32	14	6	12	38	35	+3	34
11	Dinamo Kashira	32	13	6	13	41	41	0	32
12	Spartak Tambov	32	12	5	15	31	46	−15	29
13	Krasnaya Presnya Moskva	32	11	7	14	41	41	0	29
14	Spartak Ryazan	32	10	4	18	33	51	−18	24
15	Saturn Rybinsk	32	2	11	19	19	56	−37	15
16	Volzhanin Kineshma	32	4	3	25	33	92	−59	11
17	FSM Moskva	32	0	1	31	20	124	−104	1

=== Group II [Russian Federation] ===
Pos	Team	Pld	W	D	L	GF	GA	GD	Pts
1	Krylya Sovetov Kuibyshev	32	21	5	6	76	24	+52	47
2	Zvezda Perm	32	18	10	4	48	28	+20	46
3	Metallurg Magnitogorsk	32	18	7	7	57	31	+26	43
4	Khimik Dzerzhinsk	32	16	8	8	53	32	+21	40
5	UralMash Sverdlovsk	32	15	10	7	56	30	+26	40
6	Lokomotiv Chelyabinsk	32	19	1	12	62	48	+14	39
7	Zenit Izhevsk	32	13	8	11	40	33	+7	34
8	Gastello Ufa	32	14	3	15	46	54	−8	31
9	Torpedo Togliatti	32	13	5	14	41	49	−8	31
10	Rubin Kazan	32	11	9	12	25	33	−8	31
11	Uralets Nizhniy Tagil	32	11	8	13	24	34	−10	30
12	Dinamo Kirov	32	11	6	15	38	38	0	28
13	Stal Cheboksary	32	10	7	15	29	50	−21	27
14	Volga Gorkiy	32	7	8	17	31	57	−26	22
15	Turbina Naberezhnyye Chelny	32	7	7	18	26	46	−20	21
16	Druzhba Yoshkar-Ola	32	5	11	16	28	50	−22	21
17	Torpedo Vladimir	32	2	9	21	21	64	−43	13

=== Group III [Russian Federation] ===
Pos	Team	Pld	W	D	L	GF	GA	GD	Pts
1	Dinamo Stavropol	30	22	5	3	71	23	+48	49
2	RostSelMash Rostov-na-Donu	30	17	7	6	62	33	+29	41
3	Atommash Volgodonsk	30	18	3	9	50	31	+19	39
4	Mashuk Pyatigorsk	30	18	3	9	44	27	+17	39
5	Terek Grozny	30	15	4	11	37	30	+7	34
6	Spartak Nalchik	30	12	7	11	44	40	+4	31
7	Torpedo Volzhskiy	30	15	0	15	49	51	−2	30
8	Nart Cherkessk	30	13	4	13	32	37	−5	30
9	Dinamo Makhachkala	30	12	4	14	40	46	−6	28
10	Volgar Astrakhan	30	10	8	12	32	43	−11	28
11	Uralan Elista	30	11	5	14	39	37	+2	27
12	Druzhba Maykop	30	9	7	14	26	42	−16	25
13	Sokol Saratov	30	8	8	14	33	47	−14	24
14	Torpedo Taganrog	30	7	5	18	22	48	−26	19
15	Avangard Kursk	30	7	4	19	24	47	−23	18
16	Cement Novorossiysk	30	7	4	19	18	41	−23	18

=== Group IV [Russian Federation] ===
Pos	Team	Pld	W	D	L	GF	GA	GD	Pts
1	Geolog Tyumen	26	18	4	4	56	21	+35	40
2	Luch Vladivostok	26	15	6	5	41	21	+20	36
3	Amur Komsomolsk-na-Amure	26	15	5	6	41	20	+21	35
4	Manometr Tomsk	26	13	5	8	36	29	+7	31
5	Zvezda Irkutsk	26	13	4	9	56	38	+18	30
6	Dinamo Barnaul	26	11	7	8	48	36	+12	29
7	Torpedo Rubtsovsk	26	12	4	10	31	29	+2	28
8	Selenga Ulan-Ude	26	12	3	11	38	38	0	27
9	Angara Angarsk	26	12	3	11	42	37	+5	27
10	Avtomobilist Krasnoyarsk	26	9	8	9	31	26	+5	26
11	Amur Blagoveshchensk	26	9	5	12	45	46	−1	23
12	Metallurg Novokuznetsk	26	8	6	12	37	49	−12	22
13	Lokomotiv Chita	26	2	4	20	16	75	−59	8
14	Chkalovets Novosibirsk	26	0	2	24	10	63	−53	2

=== Group V (Soviet Republics) ===
Pos	Rep	Team	Pld	W	D	L	GF	GA	GD	Pts
1	RUS	Baltika Kaliningrad	34	25	2	7	77	44	+33	52
2	BLR	Dnepr Mogilyov	34	22	6	6	71	24	+47	50
3	RUS	Metallurg Lipetsk	34	21	6	7	62	31	+31	48
4	RUS	Dinamo Bryansk	34	20	6	8	61	40	+21	46
5	BLR	GomSelMash Gomel	34	18	7	9	44	30	+14	43
6	BLR	Khimik Grodno	34	16	7	11	51	42	+9	39
7	RUS	Spartak Oryol	34	16	5	13	52	45	+7	37
8	LTU	Atlantas Klaipeda	34	14	8	12	43	41	+2	36
9	MDA	Avtomobilist Tiraspol	34	14	8	12	42	30	+12	36
10	MDA	Zarya Beltsy	34	13	7	14	37	35	+2	33
11	RUS	Salyut Belgorod	34	12	6	16	40	56	−16	30
12	LVA	Zvejnieks Liepaja	34	10	8	16	46	65	−19	28
13	BLR	Dinamo Brest	34	9	9	16	38	50	−12	27
14	RUS	Dinamo Leningrad	34	7	10	17	36	55	−19	24
15	RUS	Strela Voronezh	34	7	8	19	29	57	−28	22
16	RUS	Sever Murmansk	34	6	9	19	39	63	−24	21
17	EST	SVSM Tallinn	34	7	6	21	32	59	−27	20
18	BLR	Dvina Vitebsk	34	7	6	21	27	60	−33	20

=== Group VI [Ukraine] ===
For places 1-12

Pos	Team	Pld	W	D	L	GF	GA	GD	Pts	Qualification
1	Nyva Vinnytsia(C) (Q)	36	21	10	5	58	18	+40	52	Qualified for interzonal competitions among other Zone winners
2	Kolos Mezhyrich	36	23	5	8	60	34	+26	51	
3	Sudnobudivnyk Mykolaiv	36	20	9	7	51	22	+29	49	
4	SKA Odesa	36	19	7	10	65	37	+28	45	
5	Zakarpattia Uzhhorod	36	14	13	9	49	41	+8	41	
6	Kryvbas Kryvyi Rih	36	14	13	9	44	42	+2	41	
7	Krystal Kherson	36	16	8	12	45	47	−2	40	
8	SKA Kyiv	36	13	12	11	56	48	+8	38	
9	Prykarpattia Ivano-Frankivsk	36	14	8	14	31	36	−5	36	
10	Avanhard Rivne	36	12	12	12	23	43	−20	36	
11	Torpedo Lutsk	36	13	9	14	31	40	−9	35	
12	Novator Zhdanov	36	12	11	13	31	32	−1	35	

=== Group VII (Central Asia) ===
Pos	Rep	Team	Pld	W	D	L	GF	GA	GD	Pts
1	UZB	Dinamo Samarkand	38	21	13	4	67	39	+28	55
2	UZB	Neftyanik Fergana	38	23	7	8	80	31	+49	53
3	UZB	Surhan Termez (Note: Avtomobilist Termez changed name to Surhan.)	38	19	8	11	52	33	+19	46
4	UZB	Sohibkor Halkabad	38	18	10	10	52	39	+13	46
5	UZB	Hiva	38	20	4	14	49	44	+5	44
6	UZB	Avtomobilist Namangan (Note: Novbahor Namangan changed name to Avtomobilist.)	38	18	7	13	48	32	+16	43
7	UZB	Yeshlik Turakurgan	38	17	9	12	51	34	+17	43
8	UZB	Zarafshan Navoi	38	16	11	11	58	43	+15	43
9	UZB	Tselinnik Turtkul	38	18	6	14	50	50	0	42
10	UZB	Narimanovets Bagat	38	15	6	17	42	56	−14	36
11	TJK	Pahtakor Kurgan-Tyube	38	14	8	16	51	52	−1	36
12	UZB	Start Tashkent	38	12	11	15	52	51	+1	35
13	KGZ	Alga Frunze	38	15	3	20	53	52	+1	33
14	UZB	Beshkent	38	13	7	18	41	62	−21	33
15	TJK	Hojent Leninabad	38	10	13	15	53	57	−4	33
16	UZB	Yangiyer	38	12	8	18	47	62	−15	32
17	UZB	Kasansayets Kasansay	38	11	7	20	41	70	−29	29
18	KGZ	Alay Osh	38	10	8	20	42	66	−24	28
19	UZB	Shahrihanets Shahrihan	38	12	3	23	65	84	−19	27
20	UZB	Amudarya Nukus	38	9	5	24	40	77	−37	23

=== Group VIII [Kazakhstan] ===
Pos	Team	Pld	W	D	L	GF	GA	GD	Pts
1	Tselinnik Tselinograd	32	25	5	2	66	19	+47	55
2	Shakhtyor Karaganda	32	21	4	7	54	37	+17	46
3	Khimik Jambul	32	19	6	7	61	34	+27	44
4	Meliorator Chimkent	32	19	4	9	72	31	+41	42
5	Traktor Pavlodar	32	18	6	8	42	22	+20	42
6	Energetik Kustanay	32	18	5	9	54	38	+16	41
7	Spartak Semipalatinsk	31	16	5	10	57	33	+24	39 (Note: 2 bonus points?)
8	Aktyubinets Aktyubinsk	32	11	8	13	32	35	−3	30
9	Ekibastuzets Ekibastuz	32	10	8	14	35	45	−10	28
10	Jezkazganets Jezkazgan	32	10	8	14	31	43	−12	28
11	Bulat Temirtau	32	9	10	13	25	30	−5	28
12	Torpedo Kokchetav	32	10	6	16	33	39	−6	26
13	Zhetysu Taldy-Kurgan	32	10	6	16	52	60	−8	26
14	Meliorator Kzil-Orda	32	8	9	15	43	66	−23	25
15	Vostok Ust-Kamenogorsk	32	8	7	17	31	56	−25	23
16	Avangard Petropavlovsk	32	4	9	19	32	63	−31	17
17	SKIF Alma-Ata	32	0	4	28	15	84	−69	4

=== Group IX (Caucasus) ===
Pos	Rep	Team	Pld	W	D	L	GF	GA	GD	Pts
1	ARM	Kotaik Abovyan	32	21	4	7	66	34	+32	46
2	GEO	Mertskhali Makharadze	32	17	6	9	44	29	+15	40
3	GEO	Kolkheti Poti	32	14	11	7	51	42	+9	39
4	GEO	Lokomotiv Samtredia	32	17	4	11	43	37	+6	38
5	ARM	Spartak Oktemberyan	32	16	5	11	49	38	+11	37
6	GEO	Dila Gori	32	16	5	11	55	48	+7	37
7	AZE	Kyapaz Kirovabad	32	16	2	14	53	44	+9	34
8	TKM	Kolhozchi Ashkhabad	32	16	2	14	33	34	−1	34
9	AZE	Karabakh Stepanakert	32	15	3	14	42	38	+4	33
10	GEO	Dinamo Sukhumi	32	14	5	13	49	48	+1	33
11	GEO	Meshakhte Tkibuli	32	13	6	13	40	36	+4	32
12	ARM	Shirak Leninakan	32	13	6	13	41	39	+2	32
13	AZE	Hazar Lenkoran	32	12	6	14	42	38	+4	30
14	AZE	Avtomobilist Mingechaur	32	10	5	17	45	63	−18	25
15	GEO	Lokomotiv Tbilisi	32	10	4	18	31	49	−18	24
16	AZE	Araz Nahichevan	32	8	6	18	30	41	−11	22
17	ARM	Olimpia Artashat	32	3	2	27	26	82	−56	8

== Final group stage ==
[Oct 21 – Nov 8]

=== Group A ===
Pos	Rep	Team	Pld	W	D	L	GF	GA	GD	Pts	Promotion
1	RUS	Krylya Sovetov Kuibyshev	4	3	0	1	9	3	+6	6	Promoted
2	UKR	Niva Vinnitsa	4	1	1	2	3	3	0	3	
3	KAZ	Tselinnik Tselinograd	4	1	0	3	2	8	−6	2	

=== Group B ===
Pos	Rep	Team	Pld	W	D	L	GF	GA	GD	Pts	Promotion
1	ARM	Kotaik Abovyan	4	2	2	0	5	3	+2	6	Promoted
2	RUS	Geolog Tyumen	4	2	1	1	6	5	+1	5	
3	RUS	Zorkiy Krasnogorsk	4	0	1	3	3	6	−3	1	

=== Group C ===
Pos	Rep	Team	Pld	W	D	L	GF	GA	GD	Pts	Promotion
1	RUS	Dinamo Stavropol	4	2	1	1	5	3	+2	5	Promoted
2	UZB	Dinamo Samarkand	4	1	2	1	3	4	−1	4	
3	RUS	Baltika Kaliningrad	4	1	1	2	3	4	−1	3	

Source: rsssf.com
