= Serhiy Yashchenko =

Ukrainian footballer (born 1959)

Personal information
- Full name: Serhiy Volodymyrovych Yashchenko
- Date of birth: 25 June 1959 (age 67)
- Place of birth: Kostiantynivka, Ukrainian SSR, Soviet Union
- Height: 1.74 m (5 ft 9 in)
- Position: Midfielder

Senior career*
Years	Team	Apps	(Gls)
1981	CSKA Moscow	3	(0)
1982–1995	Shakhtar Donetsk	384	(32)
1995–1999	→ Shakhtar-2 Donetsk	74	(13)

International career
1986	Soviet Union (olympic)	2	(0)

Managerial career
- 1996–1999: Shakhtar-2 Donetsk (assistant)
- 1999–2000: Shakhtar Donetsk (assistant)
- 2000–2002: Metalurh Donetsk (assistant)
- 2002: Stal Alchevsk
- 2002–2004: Metalurh Donetsk (assistant)
- 2004–2005: Metalurh Donetsk (reserves)
- 2005–2006: Metalurh Zaporizhzhia (assistant)
- 2006–2007: Metalurh Zaporizhzhia
- 2007: Metalurh Donetsk (reserves)
- 2007–2008: Metalurh Donetsk
- 2009: Lviv (assistant)
- 2012–2013: USK-Rubin Donetsk
- 2013–2015: Kremin Kremenchuk (assistant)
- 2015–2018: Kremin Kremenchuk
- 2020–2022: Kramatorsk (U19)
- * Club domestic league appearances and goals

Serhiy Volodymyrovych Yashchenko (Ukrainian: Сергій Володимирович Ященко; born 25 June 1959) is a Ukrainian football manager and former player.

== Career ==
Yashchenko was noticed by coach Boris Kopeikin during his military service and recommended to CSKA Moscow where he spent the 1981 season in the shadow of Aleksandr Tarkhanov, playing only a couple of matches. He then went back to his native Ukraine and to Shakhtar, winning the 1983 Soviet Cup and the 1984 Soviet Super Cup. He played a total of 14 seasons with Shakhtar and won, after the collapse of the USSR, the 1995 Ukrainian Cup.

Yashchenko played couple of friendly matches for the Soviet Olympic football team in 1986 against Czechoslovakia and Sweden. He never played in official competitions for the team.

He became head coach of Ukrainian side FC Metalurh Zaporizhzhya in 2006 and guided them to the first round of the UEFA Cup and a 2–1 aggregate defeat to Panathinaikos. He left Zaporizhzhya in April 2007 and took up a position as reserve team coach at FC Metalurh Donetsk. Following the resignation of Jos Daerden as Metalurh head coach in early December 2007, Yashchenko assumed caretaker manager duties at the club before becoming the permanent manager two weeks later.

== Career statistics ==
Appearances and goals by club, season and competition
Club	Season	League		Cup		Europe		Super Cup		Total	
Club	Season	Apps	Goals	Apps	Goals	Apps	Goals	Apps	Goals	Apps	Goals
Shakhtar Donetsk	1982	19	1	-	-	-	-	-	-	19	1
Shakhtar Donetsk	1983	28	5	5	2	4	0	-	-	37	7
Shakhtar Donetsk	1984	29	6	4	1	2	0	-	-	35	7
Shakhtar Donetsk	1985	29	6	5	1	-	-	-	-	34	7
Shakhtar Donetsk	1986	30	5	4	1	-	-	1	0	35	6
Shakhtar Donetsk	1987	29	2	4	2	-	-	-	-	33	4
Shakhtar Donetsk	1988	29	0	3	1	-	-	-	-	32	1
Shakhtar Donetsk	1989	29	3	5	0	-	-	-	-	34	3
Shakhtar Donetsk	1990	20	2	3	0	-	-	-	-	23	2
Shakhtar Donetsk	1991	30	0	2	0	-	-	-	-	32	0
Shakhtar Donetsk	1992	19	1	6	0	-	-	-	-	25	1
Shakhtar Donetsk	1992–93	28	0	2	0	-	-	-	-	30	0
Shakhtar Donetsk	1993–94	33	0	3	0	-	-	-	-	36	0
Shakhtar Donetsk	1994–95	32	1	5	0	2	0	-	-	39	1
Total		384	32	51	8	8	0	1	0	444	40

== Honours ==
- Soviet Cup : 1983
- Soviet Super Cup : 1984
- Ukrainian Cup : 1995
