= Valeri Butenko =

Russian footballer and referee (1941–2020)

Personal information
- Full name: Valeri Pavlovich Butenko
- Date of birth: 16 July 1941
- Place of birth: Moscow, Russian SFSR, Soviet Union
- Date of death: 13 February 2020 (aged 78)
- Place of death: Moscow
- Position: Midfielder

Senior career*
Years	Team	Apps	(Gls)
1966	Dynamo-d Moscow		
1967	Dynamo Makhachkala		
1968–1969	Shakhter Kiselevsk		
1969–1970	Sakhalin Yuzhno-Sakhalinsk		
1971–1974	Soyuz Moscow		
- * Club domestic league appearances and goals

Valeri Butenko
Domestic
Years	League	Role
1976–1991	Soviet Top League	Referee

International
Years	League	Role
1981-1991	FIFA listed	Referee

Valeri Pavlovich Butenko (Russian: Валерий Павлович Бутенко; 16 July 1941 – 13 February 2020) was a Russian football midfielder and referee, and a Master of Sports of the USSR, known for having acted as referee at one 1986 FIFA World Cup Group D match - the game between Algeria and Northern Ireland on 3 June 1986. After retiring, Butenko served as a match supervisor. His younger brother Andrei Butenko was a football referee as well.
