= Soviet Cup =

Soviet football competition

- Organiser(s): Football Federation of the Soviet Union
- Founded: 1936; 90 years ago
- Abolished: 1992
- Region: Soviet Union
- Teams: 80 (1991–92)
- Qualifier for: European Cup Winners' Cup (from 1965)
- Last champions: Spartak Moscow (10th title)
- Most championships: Spartak Moscow (10 titles)

The Soviet Cup, or USSR Cup (Russian: Кубок СССР), (Note: Ukrainian: Кубок СРСР, Belarusian: Кубак СССР, Uzbek: СССР Кубоги, Kazakh: КСРО Кубогы, Georgian: სსრკ თასი, Azerbaijani: ССРИ кубоку, Lithuanian: TSRS taurė, Romanian: Cupa URSS (Moldovan Cyrillic: Купа УРСС), Latvian: PSRS kauss, Armenian: ԽՍՀՄ Գավաթ, Estonian: NSVL Karikas.) was the premier football cup competition in the Soviet Union conducted by the Football Federation of the Soviet Union. The 1991–92 season of the tournament was known as Soviet/CIS Cup (Russian: Кубок СССР—СНГ). As a knockout tournament it was conducted parallel to the All-Union league competitions in double round-robin format.

The winner of the competition was awarded a qualification to the UEFA Cup Winners' Cup, unless it already qualified for the European Cup, in turn passed the qualification to the finalist. In case if a team would win the UEFA Cup Winners' Cup and not win its national league cup titles the next year, it qualified to the UEFA Cup Winners' Cup along with the new cup holder. The first participation in the UEFA Cup Winners' Cup took place in 1965–66 when Dynamo Kyiv qualified for the European competition for winning the 1964 Soviet Cup.

On initiative of Komsomolskaya Pravda newspaper starting from 1977, the Soviet Cup winner was invited to contest the Soviet Top League winner in a single match competition known as the Season's Cup which served as the Soviet Super Cup but was not considered official.

== Format ==
Format of competitions was constantly changing.

The very first edition of the competition in 1936 was a single-elimination tournament (more precisely sudden-death tournament) throughout all rounds. It was played during the season's summer intermission of the 1936 split season. The tournament consisted of seven rounds starting with the Round of 128.

The first changes took place in the 1938 Soviet Cup when there was introduced a preliminary (qualification) stage as the number of participants grew. The competition still was a single-elimination tournament with only more added rounds (up to 9). The Soviet Cup also featured the 1938 Cup of the Ukrainian SSR. All teams of masters (All-Union league teams) started from the final stage. The competition rounds were in-mixed within the league's playing calendar for the first time. The final stage contained 6 rounds.

In 1939 the competition was expanded as number of participants grew over 6 times. Starting from 1939 the preliminary stage was expanded and included republican football cup for each union republic, winners of which would qualify for the Soviet Cup finals.

In 1940 the competition was split. The league teams (Groups A and B) were scheduled to play for the All-Union Sports Committee Cup, while non-league teams (republican level) were competing in a separate bracket, winner of which would play the All-Union Sports Committee Cup holder. However, due to scheduling issues the All-Union Sports Committee Cup was postponed and never took place.

Involvement of the republican cup winners was suspended after the World War II and reintroduced in 1949. Those winners continued to qualify for the Soviet Cup until 1955 and starting from 1957 they were rerouted to the Soviet Amateur Cup. There is a legend that during that period the competition was nicknamed as the "Cup of Millions".

Until 1984 the Soviet Cup corresponded to the calendar of the whole Soviet football "spring"-"fall", however after that it changed to "fall"-"spring" calendar which synchronized it with the most of Europe.

In 1959-1960 the competition was conducted for two years. From 1965 to 1968 seasons were overlapping each other.

Until 1957, in the tournament participated "teams of physical culture" (Soviet "newspeak" (phraseology) for non-professional, amateur teams). After 1957 teams of physical culture competed in a separate competition known as the Soviet Amateur Cup. (Note: broadly and officially known as the Football Cup of the Soviet Union among teams of physical culture collectives) Since then, the tournament was restricted to professional clubs (teams of masters) of the All-Union competition (tiers 1 through 3).

In 1979 to 1982 there was a group stage better teams of which would continue in a traditional single-game elimination format.

The 1992 Soviet Cup Final took place after the fall of the Soviet Union in the independent Russia.

All tournaments final were played in a single game in Moscow, but until introduction of penalty kicks in early 1970s as a tiebreaker some finals that ended in tie were replayed. Introduction of the penalty shoot-out was adopted for tiebreaker took place in 1972 after such procedure was adopted by FIFA in 1970.

Until 1955 the tournament finals were played at Central Stadium "Dynamo", after being transferred to Central Stadium of Lenin (today Luzhniki Stadium).

== Trophy ==
The cup itself is an artistically crafted crystal vase in a silver frame. The cup is crowned with a bronze figurine of a football player with a ball. The names of the teams that won the cup are engraved on the lid and base.

The trophy's height is 57 cm (22 in), weight is 6 kg (13 lb). In 1992, after Spartak Moscow won the last Soviet Cup, the trophy was given to the club forever.

The cup itself was bought in an ordinary Moscow thrift store. The first chairman of the All-Union Football Section, Aleksei Sokolov, took a liking to the small pitcher, which it was decided to make a transferable trophy. Few people knew about the Davis Cup in the Soviet Union at that time, and accusations of plagiarism could not follow by definition.

Together with the All-Union Council on Physical Culture and Sport inspector Morar, Aleksei Sokolov created a sketch of the future prize. The jewelers attached silver legs to the base and built a lid with a small hole on top. There they mounted a figurine of a football player, donated by Raspevin, a great fan of this game. The crystal chest of the trophy was decorated with the State Emblem of the Soviet Union.

== Venues of the final match ==
All finals were played in the Soviet Union capital, Moscow. In 1936 to 1955 it was Central Dynamo Stadium, while since 1957 it was Luzhniki Stadium which was known then as Lenin Central Stadium. There were also exceptions such as the venue of the final in 1977 and 1987/88 was Dynamo, while in 1978 it was the only time when Torpedo Stadium hosted the final match. The last final match in 1992 at Luzhniki was played following the dissolution of the Soviet Union.

While Spartak Moscow is the absolute leader in total number of trophies won, Dinamo Kiev won the most Soviet Cup in those finals played in Luzhniki Stadium. Also, Luzhniki were even favorable to the Western Ukrainian team of Karpaty.

=== Venues by the number of final matches ===
- 32 – Lenin Central Stadium, Moscow
- 18 – Dynamo Central Stadium, Moscow
- 1 – Torpedo Stadium, Moscow

== Seasons and final games ==
List of Soviet Cup winners
Season	Dates	Teams	Winners	Score	Runners–up
1936	18 July – 28 August	94 (Note: Initially it was announced that the competition will have 87 participants.)	Lokomotiv Moscow	2–0	Dinamo Tbilisi
1937	23 May – 16 July	125	Dynamo Moscow	5–2	Dinamo Tbilisi
1938	5 May – 14 September	64* (Note: Total number of participants in 1938 including preliminary rounds was 275.)	Spartak Moscow	3–2	Elektrik Leningrad
1939	29 July – 12 September	49	Spartak Moscow	3–1	Stalinets Leningrad
1940	22 September – 10 November	canceled, only its qualification stage had been completed (Note: After appearance of the Soviet Amateur Cup in 1957, the 1940 Soviet Cup results were associated with the new competition.)			
1941	No competition due to World War II				
1942	No competition due to World War II				
1943	No competition due to World War II				
1944	30 July – 27 August	24	Zenit Leningrad	2–1	CDKA Moscow
1945	9 September – 14 October	32	CDKA Moscow	2–1	Dynamo Moscow
1946	6 – 20 October	16	Spartak Moscow	3–2 (a.e.t.)	Dinamo Tbilisi
1947	1 June – 21 July	19* (Note: Total number of participants in 1939 including preliminary rounds was 80.)	Spartak Moscow	2–0	Torpedo Moscow
1948	25 September – 24 October	20	CDKA Moscow	3–0	Spartak Moscow
1949	16 June – 4 November	54* (Note: Total number of participants in 1949 including preliminary rounds was 120.)	Torpedo Moscow	2–1	Dynamo Moscow
1950	10 September – 6 November	69	Spartak Moscow	3–0	Dynamo Moscow
1951	11 August – 14 October	51	CDSA Moscow	2–1 (a.e.t.)	Kalinin team (Note: The team of the Moscow Military District that represented the city of Kalinin and was literally known as the team of the Kalinin City (Russian: команда г. Калинина).)
1952	21 August – 2 November	50	Torpedo Moscow	1–0	Spartak Moscow
1953	2 September – 10 October	56	Dynamo Moscow	1–0	Zenit Kuybyshev
1954	15 August – 20 October	67	Dynamo Kyiv	2–1	Spartak Yerevan
1955	25 May – 16 October	16* (Note: Total number of participants in 1955 including preliminary rounds was 67.)	CDSA Moscow	2–1	Dynamo Moscow
1956	no competition				
1957	28 April – 26 October	24* (Note: Total number of participants in 1957 including preliminary rounds was 74.)	Lokomotiv Moscow	1–0	Spartak Moscow
1958	9 June – 2 November	16* (Note: Total number of participants in 1958 including preliminary rounds was 106.)	Spartak Moscow	1–0 (a.e.t.)	Torpedo Moscow
1959–60	11 June 1959 – 31 October 1960	32* (Note: Total number of participants in 1959–60 including preliminary rounds was 113.)	Torpedo Moscow	4–3 (a.e.t.)	Dinamo Tbilisi
1961	9 May – 29 October	64* (Note: Total number of participants in 1961 including preliminary rounds was 169.)	Shakhtyor Stalino	3–1	Torpedo Moscow
1962	22 April – 11 August	32* (Note: Total number of participants in 1962 including preliminary rounds was 168.)	Shakhtyor Donetsk (Note: In November of 1961 the city of Stalino was renamed Donetsk after river Siversky Donets following the so-called de-Stalinization process.)	2–0	Znamya Truda Orekhovo-Zuyevo
1963	7 April – 10 August	48* (Note: Total number of participants in 1963 including preliminary rounds was 186.)	Spartak Moscow	2–0	Shakhtar Donetsk
1964	16 April – 27 September	52* (Note: Total number of participants in 1964 including preliminary rounds was 194.)	Dynamo Kyiv	1–0	Krylya Sovetov Kuybyshev
1965	4 April – August 15	56* (Note: Total number of participants in 1965 including preliminary rounds was 102.)	Spartak Moscow	0–0	Dynamo Minsk
1965	4 April – August 15	56*	Spartak Moscow	2–1 (a.e.t.) (replay)	Dynamo Minsk
1965–66	2 April 1965 – 8 November 1966	79* (Note: Total number of participants in 1965–66 including preliminary rounds was 203.)	Dynamo Kyiv	2–0	Torpedo Moscow
1966–67	23 April 1966 – 8 November 1967	85* (Note: Total number of participants in 1966–67 including preliminary rounds was 242.)	Dynamo Moscow	3–0	CSKA Moscow
1967–68	16 March 1967 – 8 November 1968	107* (Note: Total number of participants in 1967–68 including preliminary rounds was 255.)	Torpedo Moscow	1–0	Pakhtakor Tashkent
1969	23 March – 17 August	32* (Note: Total number of participants in 1969 including preliminary rounds was 104.)	Karpaty Lviv	2–1	SKA Rostov-on-Don
1970	31 March – 8 August	32* (Note: Total number of participants in 1970 including preliminary rounds was 105.)	Dynamo Moscow	2–1	Dinamo Tbilisi
1971	6 March – August 8	38	Spartak Moscow	2–2	SKA Rostov-on-Don
1971	6 March – August 8	38	Spartak Moscow	1–0 (replay)	SKA Rostov-on-Don
1972	20 February – August 13	36	Torpedo Moscow	0–0	Spartak Moscow
1972	20 February – August 13	36	Torpedo Moscow	1–1 (5–1 p) (replay)	Spartak Moscow
1973	4 March – 10 October	36	Ararat Yerevan	2–1 (a.e.t.)	Dynamo Kyiv
1974	6 March – 10 August	36	Dynamo Kyiv	3–0 (a.e.t.)	Zorya Voroshilovgrad
1975	16 March – 9 August	36	Ararat Yerevan	2–1	Zorya Voroshilovgrad
1976	21 March – 3 September	42	Dinamo Tbilisi	3–0	Ararat Yerevan
1977	27 March – 13 August	48	Dynamo Moscow	1–0	Torpedo Moscow
1978	3 March – 12 August	48	Dynamo Kyiv	2–1 (a.e.t.)	Shakhtar Donetsk
1979	28 February – 11 August	48	Dinamo Tbilisi	0–0 (5–4 p)	Dynamo Moscow
1980	25 February – 9 August	48	Shakhtar Donetsk	2–1	Dinamo Tbilisi
1981	20 February – 9 May	48	SKA Rostov-on-Don	1–0	Spartak Moscow
1982	19 February – 9 May	40	Dynamo Kyiv	1–0	Torpedo Moscow
1983	19 February – 8 May	40	Shakhtar Donetsk	1–0	Metalist Kharkiv
1984	18 February – 24 June	48	Dynamo Moscow	2–0 (a.e.t.)	Zenit Leningrad
1984–85	31 July 1984 – 23 June 1985	50	Dynamo Kyiv	2–1	Shakhtar Donetsk
1985–86	24 June 1985 – 2 May 1986	74	Torpedo Moscow	1–0	Shakhtar Donetsk
1986–87	2 May 1986 – 14 June 1987	80	Dynamo Kyiv	3–3 (4–2 p)	Dynamo Minsk
1987–88	6 June 1987 – 28 May 1988	80	Metalist Kharkiv	2–0	Torpedo Moscow
1988–89	2 May 1988 – 25 June 1989	80	Dnipro Dnipropetrovsk	1–0	Torpedo Moscow
1989–90	2 May 1989 – 2 May 1990	80	Dynamo Kyiv	6–1	Lokomotiv Moscow
1990–91	14 April 1990 – 23 June 1991	78	CSKA Moscow	3–2	Torpedo Moscow
1991–92	17 April 1991 – 10 May 1992	80	Spartak Moscow	2–0	CSKA Moscow

Notes:

- The "teams" column includes number of participants in the final stage (tournament proper). Those with asterisk (x*) indicates that there was a preliminary (qualification) stage with additional number of participants.

== Overall statistics ==
Until 1959-1960 season, the competition was dominated by Muscovite clubs, particularly Spartak and CSKA. Unlike the round-robin competitions, Dinamo Kiev was not as successful yet managed to get as close as possible to Spartak surpassing all other clubs out of Moscow and other Soviet cities. The first non-Moscow team that won the trophy was Zenit Leningrad which won it in the first post war season of 1944. It became the single achievement for the team out of the "northern capital". In 1961 and 1962, the competition was won back-to-back by Shakhter Donetsk which became a unique achievement. In 1969, Karpaty Lvov won the competition while playing in the second tier (Pervaya Liga) by beating SKA Rostov-na-Donu in Moscow. In 1970s teams from the Caucasus region (Dinamo Tbilisi and Ararat Yerevan) have shown good performance winning 4 trophies with 2 for each.

The only other than Moscow or Leningrad teams from Russian SFSR that won the Soviet Cup was SKA Rostov-na-Donu in 1981. Twice reached the finals but did not manage to win it were Krylya Sovetov Kuibyshev, Dinamo Minsk, Zaria Voroshilovgrad.

=== Performance by club ===
Club	Winners	Runners-up	Semi-finalists	Years won
(Russian Soviet Federative Socialist Republic) Spartak Moscow	10*	5	7	1938, 1939, 1946, 1947, 1950, 1958, 1963, 1965, 1971, 1992*
(Ukrainian Soviet Socialist Republic) Dinamo Kiev	9	1	4	1954, 1964, 1966, 1974, 1978, 1982, 1985, 1987, 1990
(Russian Soviet Federative Socialist Republic) Torpedo Moscow	6	9	5	1949, 1952, 1960, 1968, 1972, 1986
(Russian Soviet Federative Socialist Republic) Dinamo Moscow	6	5	10	1937, 1953, 1967, 1970, 1977, 1984
(Russian Soviet Federative Socialist Republic) CSKA Moscow	5	3	11	1945, 1948, 1951, 1955, 1991
(Ukrainian Soviet Socialist Republic) Shakhter Donetsk	4	4	6	1961, 1962, 1980, 1983
(Georgian Soviet Socialist Republic) Dinamo Tbilisi	2	6	7	1976, 1979
(Armenian Soviet Socialist Republic) Ararat Yerevan	2	2	2	1973, 1975
(Russian Soviet Federative Socialist Republic) Lokomotiv Moscow	2	1	7	1936, 1957
(Russian Soviet Federative Socialist Republic) Zenit Leningrad	1	2	7	1944
(Russian Soviet Federative Socialist Republic) SKA Rostov-na-Donu	1	2	0	1981
(Ukrainian Soviet Socialist Republic) Metallist Kharkov	1	1	1	1988
(Ukrainian Soviet Socialist Republic) Karpaty Lvov	1	0	2	1969
(Ukrainian Soviet Socialist Republic) Dnepr Dnepropetrovsk	1	0	5	1989
(Russian Soviet Federative Socialist Republic) Krylya Sovetov Kuibyshev	0	2	2	
(Byelorussian Soviet Socialist Republic) Dinamo Minsk	0	2	2	
(Ukrainian Soviet Socialist Republic) Zaria Voroshilovgrad	0	2	1	
(Russian Soviet Federative Socialist Republic) Elektrik Leningrad	0	1	1	
(Russian Soviet Federative Socialist Republic) Kalinin city team	0	1	0	
(Russian Soviet Federative Socialist Republic) Znamia Truda Orekhovo-Zuyevo	0	1	0	
(Uzbek Soviet Socialist Republic) Pakhtakor Tashkent	0	1	0	
(Azerbaijan Soviet Socialist Republic) Neftchi Baku	0	0	4	
(Russian Soviet Federative Socialist Republic) Dinamo Leningrad	0	0	3	
(Uzbek Soviet Socialist Republic) Dinamo Tashkent	0	0	1	
(Russian Soviet Federative Socialist Republic) Rotor Volgograd	0	0	1	
(Russian Soviet Federative Socialist Republic) VSS Moscow	0	0	1	
(Ukrainian Soviet Socialist Republic) SKA Kiev	0	0	1	
(Ukrainian Soviet Socialist Republic) SKA Odessa	0	0	1	
(Russian Soviet Federative Socialist Republic) Admiralteyets Leningrad	0	0	1	
(Kazakh Soviet Socialist Republic) Qairat Almaty	0	0	1	
(Ukrainian Soviet Socialist Republic) Chernomorets Odessa	0	0	1	
(Russian Soviet Federative Socialist Republic) Sokol Saratov	0	0	1	
(Ukrainian Soviet Socialist Republic) Sudostroitel Nikolayev	0	0	1	
(Russian Soviet Federative Socialist Republic) Iskra Smolensk	0	0	1	
(Ukrainian Soviet Socialist Republic) Tavriya Simferopol	0	0	1	
(Lithuanian Soviet Socialist Republic) Žalgiris Vilnius	0	0	1	
(Tajik Soviet Socialist Republic) Pamir Dushanbe	0	0	1	
(Russian Soviet Federative Socialist Republic) Fakel Voronezh	0	0	1	
Total	51	51	102	

- Following the dissolution of the Soviet Union on 25 December 1991, clubs from around the fallen Soviet Union refused their further participation among which were Ukrainian clubs who effectively forfeiting their chances at the Cup, Belarusian Dinamo Minsk, Kazakhstani Khimik Dzhambul, and others, leaving only Pamir Dushanbe as the non-Russian club still in the competition.

=== Performance by republic ===
Republic	Winners	Runners-up	Semi-finals	Winning clubs
Russian SFSR	31	32	59	Spartak Moscow (10), Dinamo Moscow (6), Torpedo Moscow (6), CSKA Moscow (5), Lokomotiv Moscow (2), Zenit Leningrad (1), SKA Rostov-na-Donu (1)
Ukrainian SSR	16	8	24	Dinamo Kiev (9), Shakhter Donetsk (4), Metallist Kharkov (1), Karpaty Lvov (1), Dnepr Dnepropetrovsk (1)
Georgian SSR	2	6	7	Dinamo Tbilisi (2)
Armenian SSR	2	2	2	Ararat Yerevan (2)
Byelorussian SSR	0	2	2	
Uzbek SSR	0	1	1	
Azerbaijan SSR	0	0	4	
Kazakh SSR	0	0	1	
Lithuanian SSR	0	0	1	
Tajik SSR	0	0	1	
Total	51	51	102	

== Best coaches ==
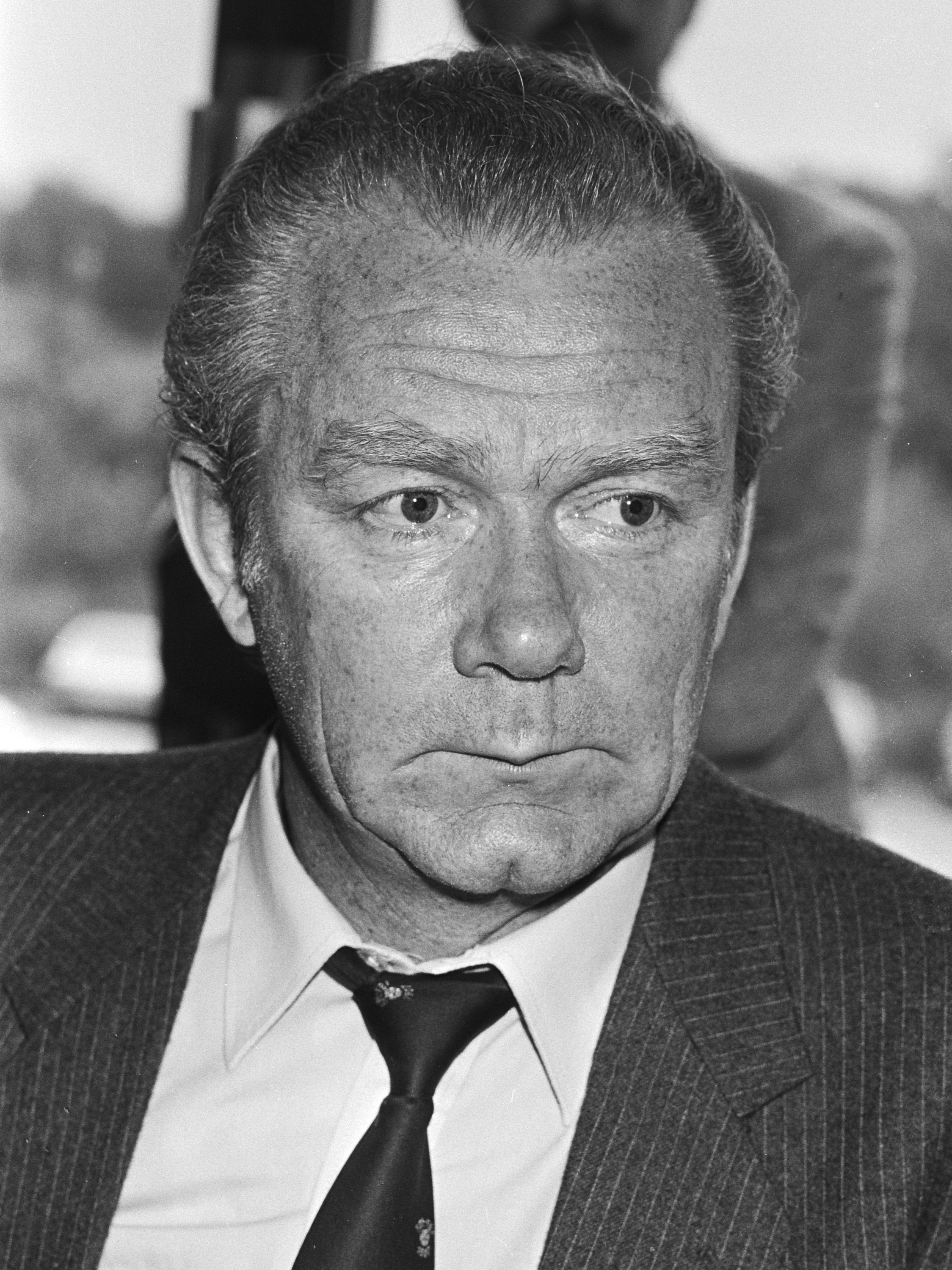
Valeriy Lobanovsky (1939-2002).

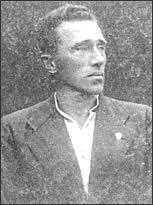
Boris Arkadiev (1899-1986).

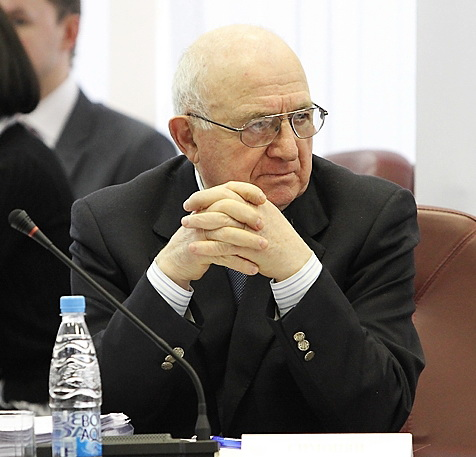
Nikita Simonyan (1926-2025).

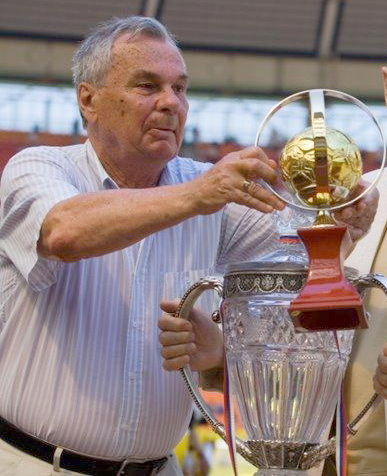
Valentin Ivanov (1934-2011).

Place	Name	Medals		Champion clubs
Place	Name	gold	silver	Champion clubs
1	Viktor Maslov	6	3	Torpedo Moscow (3), Dynamo Kyiv (2), Ararat Yerevan (1)
2	Valeriy Lobanovsky	6	-	Dynamo Kyiv
3	Boris Arkadiev	4	1	CDKA Moscow (3), Lokomotiv Moscow (1)
3	Nikita Simonyan	4	1	Spartak Moscow (3), Ararat Yerevan (1)
5	Oleg Oshenkov	3	1	Shakhtar Donetsk (2), Dynamo Kyiv (1)
6	Valentin Ivanov	2	5	Torpedo Moscow
7	Aleksandr Sevidov	2	2	Dynamo Moscow
8-11	Nodar Akhalkatsi	2	1	Dinamo Tbilisi
8-11	Konstantin Beskov	2	1	Dynamo Moscow
8-11	Konstantin Kvashnin	2	1	Spartak Moscow, Torpedo Moscow
8-11	Viktor Nosov	2	1	Shakhtar Donetsk

Another coach Albert Vollrat won two cups in 1946 and 1947.
