= FC Zorya Luhansk =

Ukrainian professional football club

Zorya Luhansk
- Full name: Футбольний клуб «Зоря» Луганськ; Football Club Zorya Luhansk
- Nickname: Muzhyky (The Dudes)
- Founded: 5 May 1923; 103 years ago
- Ground: Slavutych-Arena, Zaporizhzhia (Avanhard Stadium, Luhansk)
- Capacity: 12,000
- Owner: Yevhen Heller
- Owner: Ihor Huz
- Head coach: Viktor Skrypnyk
- League: Ukrainian Premier League
- 2025–26: Ukrainian Premier League, 8th of 16
- Website: fczorya.com
Home colours	Away colours

FC Zorya Luhansk (Ukrainian: ФК «Зоря» Луганськ [zoˈrʲɑ lʊˈɦɑnʲsʲk]) is a Ukrainian football team based in the city of Luhansk. Due to the Russo-Ukrainian War, after 2014 the team was forced to play its games at Slavutych-Arena in Zaporizhzhia.

The modern team was established on 10 April 1964 by the Football Federation of the Soviet Union, merging the October Revolution Plant (Luhanskteplovoz) sports club Zorya and the Luhansk regional branch of the "Trudovye Rezervy" sports society. In 1972, as Zaria Voroshilovgrad, the club became the first provincial Soviet club to win the Soviet Top League title. Today, they consider predecessor the football team of the Luhansk Steam Locomotive Plant (October Revolution Steam Locomotive Plant, today Luhanskteplovoz) that was established back in 1923, however due to poor performance of the factory team in the 1950s which played at republican level, the playing record of "Trudovye Rezervy" which played at all-Union level is also considered part of the club's history. It has been a flagman club in Luhansk Oblast and one of three Ukrainian football "teams of masters" that won the Soviet Top League. The name Zorya roughly means "dawn" in Ukrainian or more precisely the red skies phenomenon.

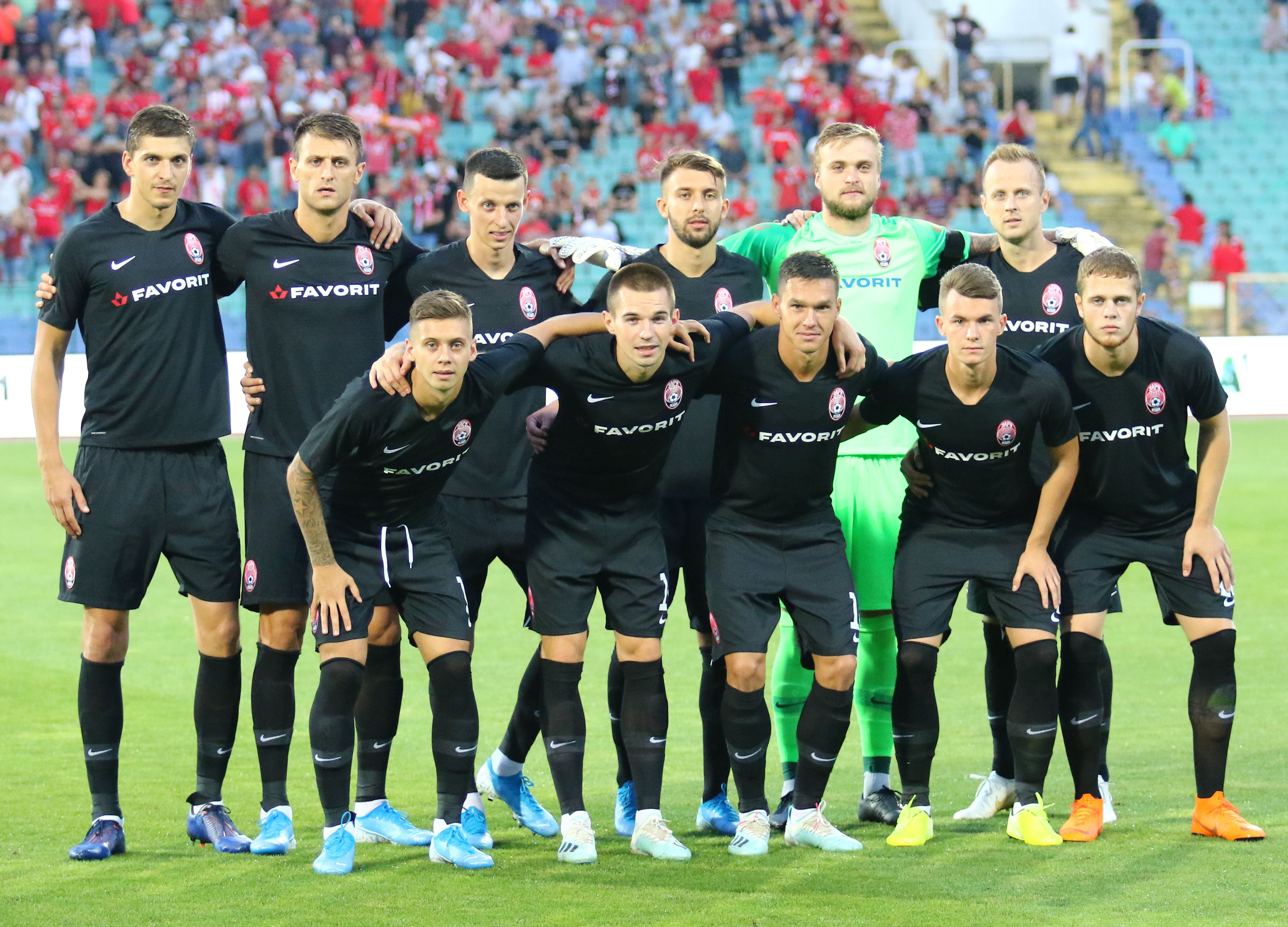
FC Zorya Luhansk in 2019

== History ==
History of Zorya Luhansk

Metalist (1923)
Dynamo Sports Club
Dzerzhynets Sports Society (1936–1941)
Dynamo Sports Club
Dzerzhynets Sports Society (1948)
Trudovi Rezervy (1949)
Trudovi Rezervy (1950–1951)
Avanhard Sports Society (1954–1959)
Trudovi Rezervy (1957)
Zorya Sports Club (1960)
Zorya Luhansk (1964)

The modern professional team of Zorya Luhansk, during its Soviet period known also as Zaria Voroshilovgrad/Lugansk and for a short period Zorya-MALS, was created in 1964 as the city's team of masters by merging the factory team with another team of masters "Trudovye Rezervy". Before 1964, the factory team played mostly in republican competitions of the Ukrainian SSR.

The history of football in the city of Luhansk begins in the early 20th century. The first Luhansk team was created in the Russian Empire in 1908 when the workers of the Russischen Maschinenbaugesellschaft Hartmann (today "Luhansk Locomotive") created the "Society of Rational Recreations". One of the disciplines was a game of kickball headed by the Czech specialist Henrich Drževikovski from Prague, who originally was an instructor of gymnastics of the factory's ministerial school. That team played its games and conducted its training on the empty lot near the factory where today the sport hall "Zorya" is located.

The first mention of games involving the Luhansk team dates back to 1911. In 1913 in Kostyantynivka the first regional football league of Donets basin was created. During World War I and the subsequent Soviet and German hostilities, the league was suspended until 1920, by which time the situation in the region had stabilized. In 1922 a new stadium was built, possibly "on the personal order" of Vladimir Lenin and later named after him. In 1923 the workers of the Luhansk steam train factory of the October Revolution (hence the club's logo with a locomotive) organized their football team "Metalist" which became the forerunner of today's Zorya. The following year there the championship of the newly created Luhansk okruha (district) was created. In the final game the collective city team of Luhansk was victorious against their rivals from the city of Snizhne, winning the title after extra time 1–0. In 1926, the All-Ukrainian Committee of the Mining Workers' council organized a team of Donbass miners, players from Kadiivka, for a tour in Germany (Weimar Republic). There the Donbass team won four of their eight games. The following year an international game took place in Luhansk, in which the city team was challenged by their rivals from Austria. The Donbas players lost the game.

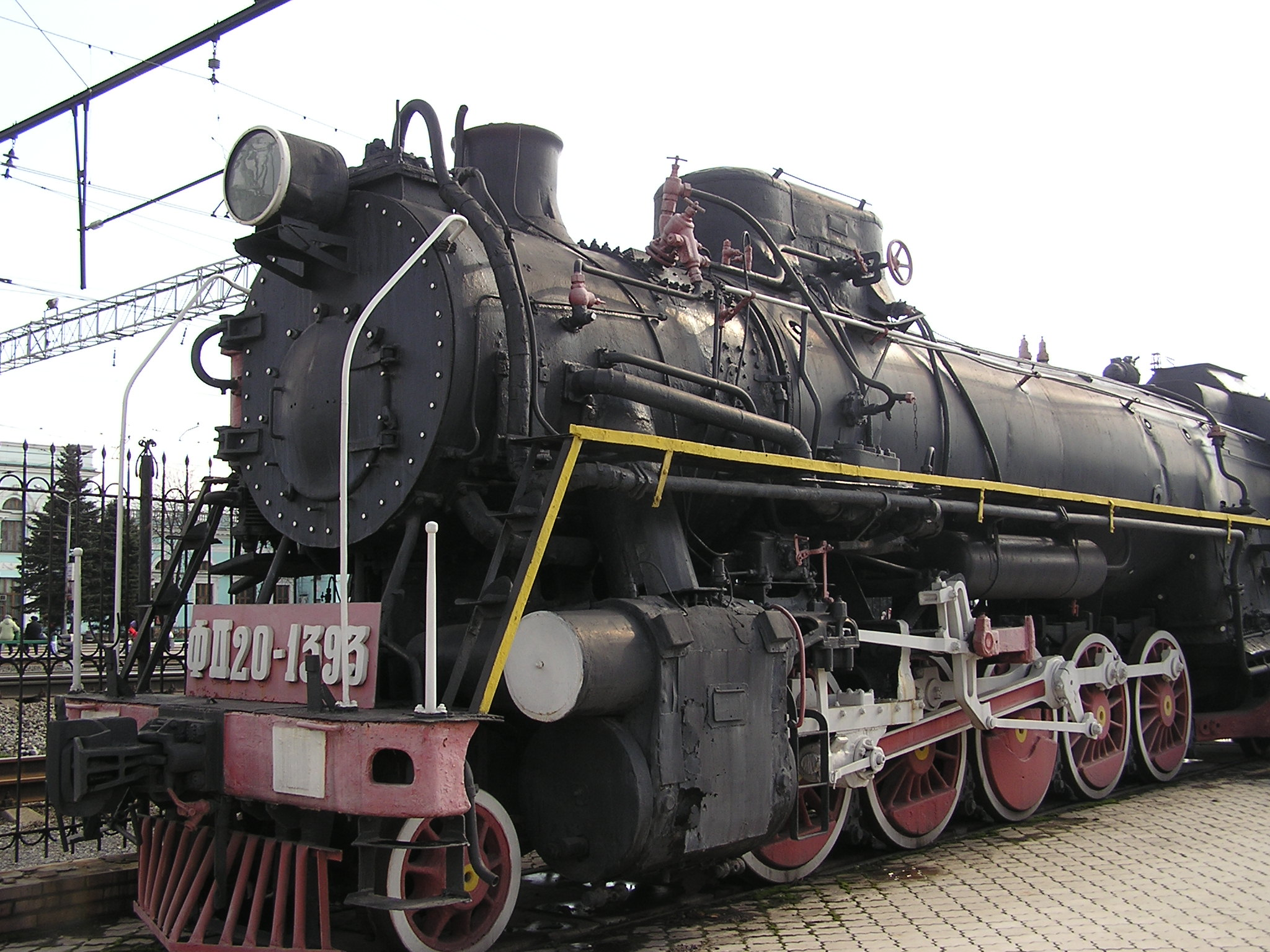
FD in Donetsk (2008)

In 1936 the football teams "Metalist" and "Dynamo" (KGB team) merged to form the united Luhansk city-team which the following year was named Dzerzhynets Sports Society (Ukrainian: Dzerzhynets Voroshylovhrad; DZV). The name "Dzerzhynets" derives from the steam locomotive that was produced at the steam train factory FD – "Felix Dzerzhinsky". That year "Dzerzhynets" reached 3rd place in the Ukrainian second league.

In 1937 "Dzerzhynets" won Ukrainian's second league and was promoted to the first. Moreover, it reached the 1/8 final of the Ukrainian Cup and the 1/16 final of the Soviet Cup. The team consisted of the following players: Klad'ko (coach), Hrebenyuk, Svidyns'kyi, Mazanov, Morozov, Krasyuk, Nosko, Movchan, Brovenko, Chernyavs'kyi, Voloschenko, Lokotosh, Sytnikov, Yevdokymov, Myroshnikov, Ishchenko. In 1938 "Dzerzhynets" became champions of Ukraine after having won 9 games and drawn two. It was thus admitted to all-Union competitions, the 1939 Soviet Football Championship Gruppa B (second tier). It made its debut on Friday, 12 May 1939 in away match in Dnipro against Stal Dnipropetrovsk which Dzerzhynets lost 0:1. The goal was scored by Vasyl Hotselyuk. The team was composed of the following players: Pavlo Svidynskyi (goalkeeper), Mykhailo Sukharev, Semen Myroshnikov, Oleksandr Kulahin, Hryhoriy Nosko (all defenders), Mykola Krasyuk, Artavazd Akopyants (both halfbacks), Kostiantyn Pyrohov, Pyotr Buyanov, Mykola Lokotosh, Petro Yurchenko (all forwards).

=== Post war revival ===
After World War II, the club was not revived right away. The city of Luhansk was represented by Dynamo Luhansk, while in 1949–1951 there was as well a team of the Luhansk regional party administration "Trudovi Rezervy". In 1950 Dynamo Luhansk merged into Trudovi Rezervy. In 1951 the chief of Trudovi Rezervy's regional administration, Ivan Lomakin; went on trial and the team was liquidated. In 1948 "Dzerzhynets" was re-established in the lower leagues of the Ukrainian championship. Due to the liquidation of Trudovi Rezervy, Dzerzhynets was allowed to compete among the "mater teams" (Soviet terminology for their professional level). Few players from Trudovi Rezervy joined the factory team. In 1954, Dzerzhynets was transferred under the administration of the Republican Volunteer Society of "Avanhard" which continued its participation in competitions until 1959.

Due to a bleak performance of "Avanhard" in 1957 in the city of Voroshilovhrad, it was revived as another club "Trudovi Rezervy" which this time comprised students from the Leningrad Technicum of Physical Culture and Sports (today College of Physical Culture and Sports of the Saint Petersburg State University). After the liquidation of Avanhard in 1959, in 1960 in Luhansk the October Revolution (OR) Factory team. was established. Since 1960 the Football championship of the Ukrainian SSR among "teams of masters" was conducted as part of the Class B competitions which at first were second tier and later third tier until completely phased away. Afterwards, Ukrainian football competitions were adopted into one of zones of the Soviet Second League. Another all-Ukrainian football competitions among "collectives of physical culture" (KFK) were conducted since 1964 that were ongoing until 1991 and sometimes are confused for the actually championship mentioned before. Neither Trudovi rezervy or Zorya played in competitions among collectives of physical culture", but did play in football championship of Ukrainian SSR which until 1959 was not considered as a competition among teams of masters.

=== Modern period ===
During the already ongoing 1964 season and playing several rounds, on 10 April 1964 the Soviet Football Federation issued its decision about merger of two clubs "Trudovi Rezervy" and OR Factory team (SC Zorya) into FC Zorya Voroshilovhrad. In 1972 Zorya did not only win its only Soviet championship, but also represented, re-enforced with only three players from other clubs, the USSR at the Brazilian Independence Cup (Taça Independência) mid-year. However, only Volodymyr Onyshchenko represented the club at the Final of the European Football Championship few weeks earlier. In 1992 the club was acquired by a Moscow Science-Production Association "MALS" and participated in the competition of the Ukrainian Top League.

In the season 2005–06 they won first place in the Persha Liha, and had been promoted to the Vyscha Liha. Zorya was one of the original twenty teams to debut for the first season of the Ukrainian Premier League. The team played for five seasons until the 1995–96 season in which they finished eighteenth and were sent down to the Persha Liha. Zorya relegated to Druha Liha in 1996–97 season but she returned to Persha Liha in 2003–04 season. The War in Donbas which started in 2014 made the team relocate to Zaporizhzhia, as Luhansk was seized by the Russian-backed Luhansk People's Republic forces. In 2016 the team had advanced sufficiently in the standings that they were involved in the European wide play-offs in the UEFA Europa League. In the 2016-17 Europa League season, Zorya Luhansk played group matches against Feyenoord, Fenerbahçe, and Manchester United.

=== Names ===
Predecessors

- 1923–35: FC Metallist Lugansk (city was renamed to Voroshilovgrad in 1935)
- 1936–40: FC Dzerzhinets Voroshilovgrad (dissolved due to the war; named after Felix Dzerzhinsky)
- 1948–53: FC Dzerzhinets Voroshilovgrad (team transferred under Avanhard sports society)
- 1953–59: FC Avangard Voroshilovgrad (reorganized, city was renamed to Lugansk in 1958)

Trudovi Rezervy

- 1949–51: Trudovye Rezervy Voroshilovgrad (team liquidated, criminal proceedings)
- 1957–64: Trudovye Rezervy Lugansk (new team; team merged into SC Zorya)

Zorya

- 1960–64: SC Zaria Lugansk (revived as the OR Factory sports club and reorganized)
- 1964–70: FC Zaria Lugansk (merged with Trudovi Rezervy to united football club)
- 1970–90: FC Zaria Voroshilovgrad (city was renamed to Voroshilovgrad in 1970)
- 1990–91: FC Zaria Lugansk (city was renamed back to Lugansk in 1990)
- 1992–96: FC Zorya-MALS Luhansk (renamed with adding of the sponsor name)
- 1996–present: FC Zorya Luhansk (Ukrainian period, modern team)

== Colours and badge ==
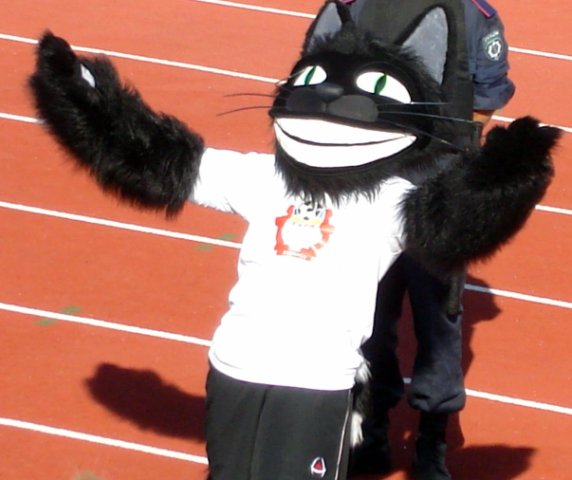
Mascot with the club's old badge used in 2000–2010

The club's colours have been black and white. In 2010 the club adopted its own mascot, a black-white cat which after the club's relocation also moved to Zaporizhia.

The club's badge was adopted after 2010 and was completely redesigned. In the early 1990s the club's badge also carried the brand of local company "MALS". Earlier badges had a silhouette of an oncoming locomotive.

== Stadiums ==
The oldest stadium in Luhansk is Lenin Stadium, built in 1922, and for long time was the main city stadium. In March 1951, the Voroshilov Stadium was opened in Luhansk, with a capacity of 7,447 seats. The stadium belonged to the Lokomotiv production association Luhanskteplovoz. In 1961 it was renamed "Avanhard". Since 1962 it became the home for Trudovi Rezervy and later Zorya. In 2000–2002, the stadium was sold and became the property of the city. In 2003, Avanhard was fully renovated. Following the Russian aggression against Ukraine, in 2014 Zorya relocated to Zaporizhia where they played at Slavutych Arena.

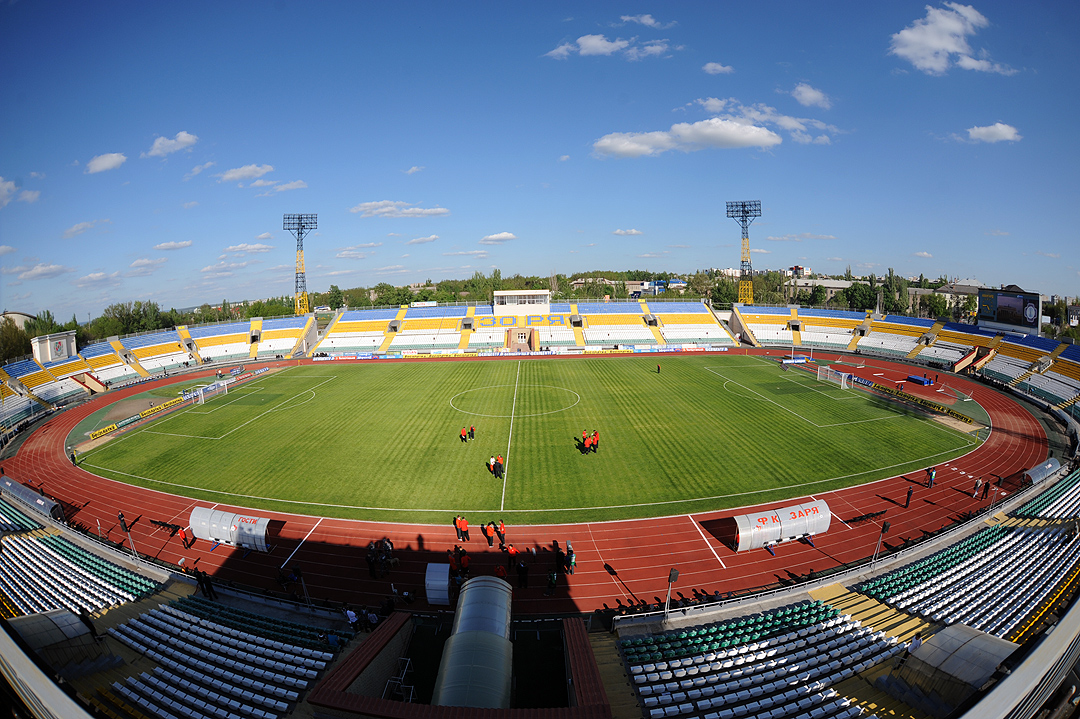
Stadion "Avanhard" in Luhansk (2009)

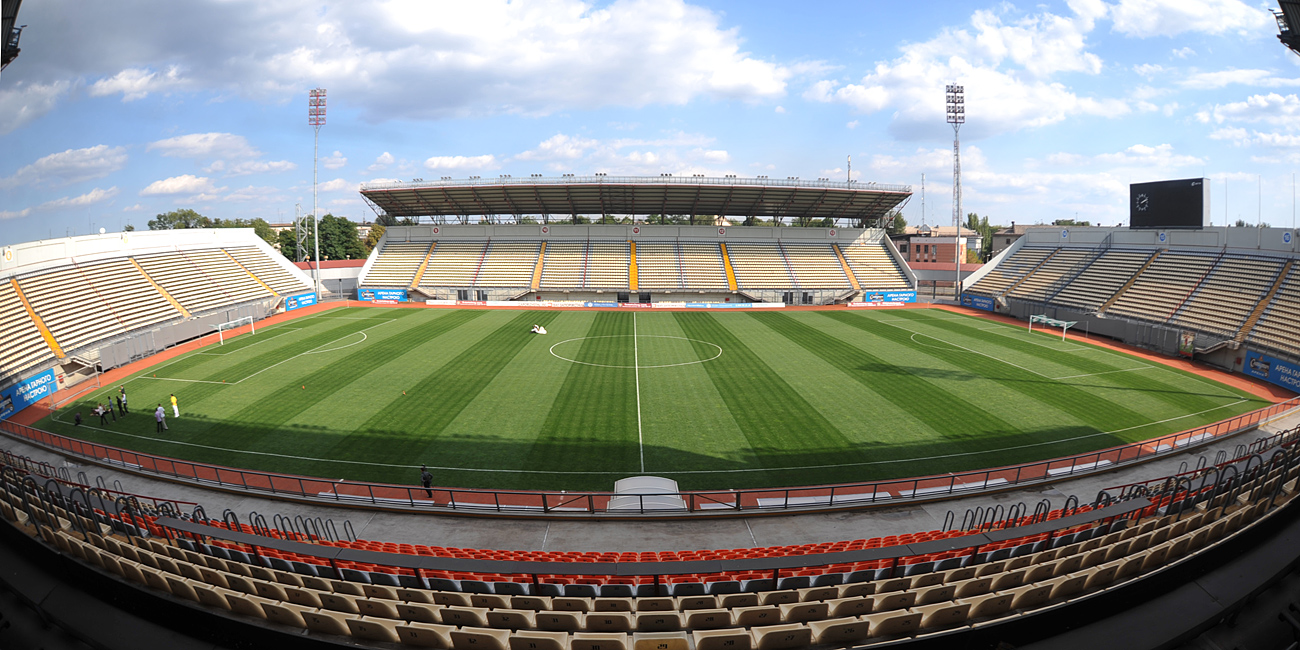
Slavutych Arena in Zaporizhia (2011)

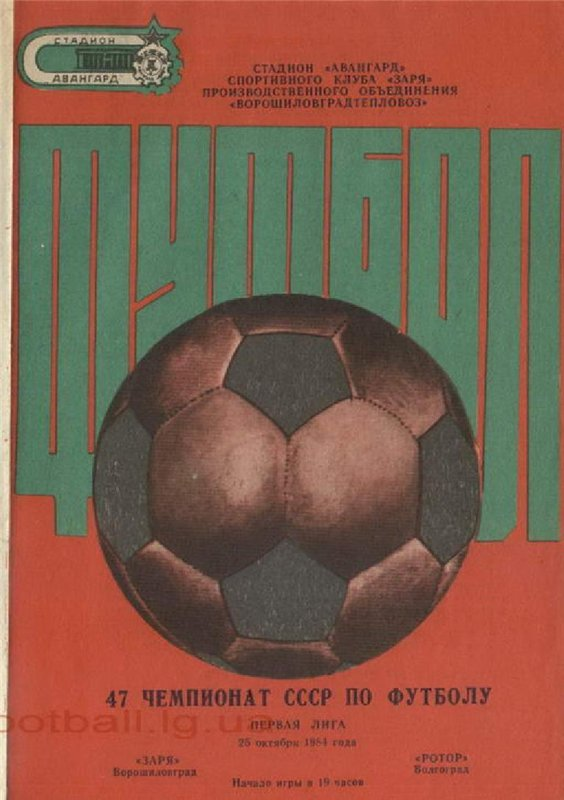
Announcement about the 1984 season's game Zoria–Rotor

== Reserve team ==
The reserve team of Zorya, Zorya Luhansk Reserves (Ukrainian: ФК «Зоря» Луганськ дубль) currently plays in the Ukrainian Premier Reserve League.

== Kits and sponsors ==
Years	Kit manufacturer	Shirt sponsor
2006–07	Umbro	–
2007–09	Puma	–
2009–10	Puma	dm bank
2010–11	Nike	–
2011–15	Nike	Holsten
2015–17	Nike	–
2017–21	Nike	Favorite Sport
2021–22	Nike	Marsbet
2022–23	Nike	–
2023–	Puma	–

== Honours ==
=== Domestic competitions ===
==== Soviet Union ====
- Soviet Top League
  - Winners (1): 1972
- Soviet Cup
  - Runners-up (2): 1974, 1975
- Soviet First League (Class A, Second Group) (Note: Both wins came when the tier was called as Class A, Second Group.)
  - Winners (2): 1962, (Note: as Trudovi Rezervy) (Note: as the Champion of Ukraine) 1966
- Soviet Second League
  - Winners (1): 1986
  - Runners-up (1): 1991 (West)
- Ukrainian SSR (parallel competition since 1960, please, refrain from placing it as the Soviet Second League as it not always had the same status)
  - Winners (3): 1938, 1962, 1986
  - Runners-up (1): 1950,

==== Ukraine ====
- Ukrainian Cup
  - Runners-up (2): 2015–16, 2020–21
- Ukrainian First League
  - Winners (1): 2005–06
- Ukrainian Second League
  - Winners (1): 2002–03
  - Runners-up (1): 1998–99 (Group C)

== Current squad ==
As of 19 September 2026

Note: Flags indicate national team as defined under FIFA eligibility rules; some limited exceptions apply. Players may hold more than one non-FIFA nationality.

No.	Pos.	Nation	Player
1	GK	UKR	Oleksandr Saputin
3	DF	UKR	Vasyl Kravets
4	DF	AUT	Gabriel Eskinja
5	DF	BIH	Andrija Janjić
6	MF	BIH	Dejan Popara
7	FW	LUX	Gerson Rodrigues
8	MF	UKR	Kyrylo Dryshlyuk
9	FW	UKR	Artem Seslar
10	DF	BRA	Juninho
11	FW	UKR	Ihor Horbach
14	MF	UKR	Anton Hlushchenko (on loan from Shakhtar Donetsk)
17	FW	UKR	Fedir Zadorozhnyi (on loan from Dynamo Kyiv)
18	MF	UKR	Maksym Boyko
21	MF	CRO	Jakov Bašić

No.	Pos.	Nation	Player
23	GK	UKR	Illya Karavashchenko
25	GK	UKR	Vladyslav Rybak
27	FW	CRO	Domagoj Jelavić
28	FW	UKR	Pylyp Budkivskyi
30	MF	UKR	Ivan Nesterenko
39	DF	UKR	Artem Macheliuk
40	DF	BRA	Ítalo Henrique
44	DF	UKR	Ihor Perduta
55	DF	BRA	Jordan
77	MF	UKR	Bohdan Kushnirenko
80	MF	UKR	Vladlen Yurchenko
88	MF	SLE	Sallieu Bah
99	FW	UKR	Artem Serdyuk

=== Out on loan ===
Note: Flags indicate national team as defined under FIFA eligibility rules; some limited exceptions apply. Players may hold more than one non-FIFA nationality.

No.	Pos.	Nation	Player
7	MF	BIH	Nemanja Anđušić (at Al Orooba Club until 30 June 2027)

== Technical staff ==
Administration	Coaching (senior team)	Coaching (U-19 team)
President – Yevhen Heller; Deputy General director – Yuriy Koval; Nachalnik komandy – Ihor Huz	Assistant coach – (Ukraine) Serhiy Rudenko	Assistant coach – (Ukraine) Oleksiy Drotsenko; Assistant coach – (Ukraine) Yevhen Yastrebinskyi; Assistant coach – (Ukraine) Pavlo Cherednichenko; Goalkeeping coach – (Ukraine) Artem Koleda; Goalkeeping coach – (Ukraine) Vsevolod Romanenko

=== Presidents and owners ===
- 1989–90: Administration chairman Oleksiy Vintun
- 1990: Chairman I. Shyrokyi
- 1990: Chairman O. Lyakhov
- 1990–92: President Yuriy Koniayev
- 1992–96: President Volodymyr Tarasenko
- 1996–01: President Dmytro Makarenko
- 2001–02: President Volodymyr Makarov
- 2002–05: President Yuriy Sevastianov
- 2005–07: President Valeriy Shpichka
- 2007–09: President and owner Valeriy Bukayev
- 2009: Owner Marina Bukayeva
  - 2009: President Oleksandr Yehorov
  - 2009: President Manolis Pilavov
- 2009–2023: President and owner Yevhen Heller

=== General directors ===
- 2009–2020 Serhiy Rafailov
- 2020–2023 Stanislav Ohanov
- Ihor Huz (nachalnik komandy)

== Most capped players ==
No.	Name	Playing period	League	Cup	Europe	Total
1	Anatoliy Kuksov	1969–85	424	89	4	517
2	Yuriy Kolesnikov	1977–92 (w/breaks)	382	81	0	461
3	Oleksandr Tkachenko	1967–87 (w/breaks)	370	33	4	407
4	Oleksandr Zhuravlyov	1965–79	316	34	2	352
5	Oleksandr Malyshenko	1978–96	318	18	0	336
6	Vitaliy Tarasenko	1982–90	323	10	0	333
7	Valeriy Galustov	1959–68	326	4	0	330
8	Viktor Kuznetsov	1968–79	272	42	4	318
9	Yuriy Yaroshenko	1982–90	304	11	0	315
10	Serhiy Yarmolych	1984–96 (w/breaks)	306	5	0	311

== Top scoring players ==
No.	Name	Playing period	League	Cup	Europe	Total
1	Oleksandr Malyshenko	1978–96	121	3	0	124
2	Anatoliy Kuksov	1969–85	89	7	1	97
3	Yuriy Kolesnikov	1977–92 (w/breaks)	81	7	0	88
4	Timerlan Guseinov	1985–93 (w/breaks)	66	2	0	68
5	Aleksandr Gulevsky	1957–61	61	0	0	61
6	Viktor Kuznetsov	1968–79	40	10	1	51
7	Yuriy Yaroshenko	1982–90	47	1	0	48
8	Ihor Balaba	1960–68	42	2	0	44
9	Yuriy Yeliseyev	1970–77	36	7	0	43
10	Yevgeniy Volchenkov	1961–64	40	1	0	41

== Managers ==
=== First team ===
- (Soviet Union) Ivan Kladko (Jan 1936–Dec 1939)
- (Soviet Union) Aleksandr Abramov (Jan 1957–Sept 1957)
- (Soviet Union) Alexey Vodyagin (Sept 1957–Dec 1959)
- (Soviet Union) Mikhail Antonevich (Jan 1960–July 1960)
- (Soviet Union) Hryhoriy Balaba (Aug 1960–Dec 1961)
- (Soviet Union) German Zonin (Jan 1962–May 1964)
- (Soviet Union) Oleksandr Alpatov (May 1964–Dec 1964)
- (Soviet Union) Konstantin Beskov (Jan 1965–Dec 1965)
- (Soviet Union) Yevgeny Goryansky (Jan 1966–Dec 1967)
- (Soviet Union) Petro Stupakov (Jan 1968–June 1968)
- (Soviet Union) Viktor Gureyev (July 1968–Sept 1o69)
- (Soviet Union) German Zonin (Sept 1969–Dec 1972)
- (Soviet Union) Vsevolod Blinkov (Jan 1973–June 1974)
- (Soviet Union) Yevgeny Pestov (June 1974–Dec 1974)
- (Soviet Union) Yuriy Zakharov (Jan 1975–Dec 1975)
- (Soviet Union) Yevgeny Pestov (Jan 1976–Dec 1976)
- (Soviet Union) Yozhef Sabo (Jan 1977–Dec 1977)
- (Soviet Union) Yuriy Zakharov (Jan 1978–Dec 1979)
- (Soviet Union) Vadym Dobizha (Jan 1980–Dec 1981)
- (Soviet Union) Yuriy Rashchupkin (Jan 1982–Dec 1983)
- (Soviet Union) Oleh Bazilevich (Jan 1984–Dec 1984)

- (Soviet Union) Oleksandr Zhuravlyov (Jan 1985–Dec 1985)
- (Soviet Union) Vadym Dobizha (Dec 1985–July 1988)
- (Soviet Union) Anatoly Baidachny (Aug 1988–Dec 1989)
- (Soviet Union) Viktor Nosov (Jan 1990–Aug 1990)
- (Ukraine) Anatoliy Kuksov (Aug 1990–June 1993)
- (Ukraine) Anatoliy Shakun (June 1993–March 1994)
- (Ukraine) Volodymyr Kobzarev (March 1994–Dec 1994)
- (Ukraine) Yuriy Sevastyanov (Jan 1995–March 1995)
- (Ukraine) Anatoliy Korshykov (March 1995–April 1995)
- (Ukraine) Oleksandr Zhuravlyov (April 1995–Oct 1995)
- (Ukraine) Anatoliy Korshykov (Oct 1995–Nov 1995)
- (Ukraine) Viktor Aristov (Jan 1996–June 1996)
- (Ukraine) Anatoliy Kuksov (Aug 1996–Nov 1996)
- (Ukraine) Oleksandr Shakun (March 1997–Nov 1997)
- (Ukraine) Vadym Dobizha (March 1998–July 1998)
- (Ukraine) Oleksandr Shakun (interim) (Aug 1998)
- (Ukraine) Vadym Dobizha (Aug 1998–April 2000)
- (Ukraine) Yuriy Yeliseyev (April 2000–Nov 2000)
- (Ukraine) Serhiy Pohodin (March 2001–Nov 2001)
- (Ukraine) Yuriy Yeliseyev (March 2002–June 2002)
- (Ukraine) Volodymyr Kobzarev (July 2002–July 2003)
- (Ukraine) Oleksiy Chystyakov (Aug 2003–Sept 2003)

- (Ukraine) Yuriy Sevastyanov (interim) (Sept 2003)
- (Ukraine) Oleksandr Dovbiy (Sept 2003–June 2004)
- (Ukraine) Yuriy Koval (July 2004–Aug 10, 2006)
- (Ukraine) Yuriy Malyhin (interim) (Aug 2006)
- (Ukraine) Volodymyr Bezsonov (Aug 25, 2006 – Nov 3, 2006)
- (Ukraine) Yuriy Malyhin (interim) (Nov 2006–Jan 2007)
- (Ukraine) Oleksandr Kosevych (Jan 1, 2007 – March 24, 2008)
- (Ukraine) Anatoliy Volobuev (March 24, 2008 – May 18, 2009)
- (Ukraine) Yuriy Dudnyk (interim) (May 18, 2009 – Sept 23, 2009)
- (Ukraine) Yuriy Koval (Sept 23, 2009 – Dec 31, 2009)
- (Ukraine) Anatoly Chantsev (Jan 1, 2010 – Nov 27, 2011)
- (Ukraine) Yuriy Vernydub (Nov 28, 2011 – May 31, 2019)
- (Ukraine) Viktor Skrypnyk (June 3, 2019 – Jun 28, 2022)
- (Netherlands) Patrick van Leeuwen (Jun 28, 2022 – July 3, 2023)
- (Serbia) Nenad Lalatović (July 4, 2023 – August 27, 2023)
- (Croatia) Mladen Bartulović (interim) (August 27, 2023 – September 9, 2023)
- (Ukraine) Valeriy Kryventsov (September 9, 2023 – November 11, 2023)
- (Ukraine) Yuriy Koval (interim) (November 11, 2023 – August 26, 2024)
- (Croatia) Mladen Bartulović (interim) (August 26, 2024 – June 16, 2025)
- (Ukraine) Viktor Skrypnyk (June 16, 2025 – )

=== Reserve team ===
- (Ukraine) Volodymyr Mykytyn (2008 – 2021)

=== Longest serving coaches ===
Last Updated after 2020/21 season

No.	Name	Nation	Time period	G	W	D	L	GS	GA	Achievement
1	Vadym Dobizha	Soviet Union Ukraine	1980–1981 and 1985-1988	259	114	55	90	358	331	10/24 (1987 Second Division)
2	German Zonin	Soviet Union Russia	1962–1964 and 1969-1972	178	77	62	39	241	149	Champion (1972 First Division)
3	Yuriy Vernydub	Ukraine	2011–2019	141	62	37	42	211	169	3/12 (2016–17 First Division)
4	Anatoliy Kuksov	Ukraine	1990–1993 and 1996	105	52	18	35	154	117	12/20 (1992 First Division)
5	Yuriy Zakharov	Soviet Union Russia	1975 and 1978–1979	94	25	30	39	111	143	9/16 (1975 and 1978 First Division)
6	Yuriy Rashchupkin	Soviet Union Ukraine	1982–1983	84	33	20	31	131	119	6/22 (1982 Second Division)
7	Yuriy Koval	Ukraine	2004–2006 and 2009	81	48	18	15	137	55	3/18 (2004–05 Second Division)
8	Anatoly Baidachny	Soviet Union Russia	1988–1989	78	34	20	24	119	93	20/22 (1988 Second Division)
9	Yevgeny Goryansky	Soviet Union Russia	1966–1967	74	26	27	21	64	58	16/19 (1967 First Division)
10	Alexey Vodyagin	Soviet Union Russia	1957–1959	65	29	17	19	95	68	4/14 (1959 Second Division)

== League and cup history ==
FC Zorya Luhansk spent 14 seasons in the Soviet top tier including the Class A Group One and the Top League (1967–1979). The club managed to become champions of the Soviet Union in 1972. Following dissolution of the Soviet Union, as Ukrainian club Zorya spent 20 seasons in the Ukrainian top tier including the Top League and the Premier League (1992–1996 and 2006–present).

The statistics is based on information from the club's official website.

=== Trudovi Rezervy ===
Season	Div.	Pos.	Pl.	W	D	L	GS	GA	P	Domestic Cup	Europe	Notes
Trudovi Rezervy / Trudovye Rezervy
1949	2nd (Gruppa II. Ukrainskaya Zona)	15	34	9	6	19	44	59	24			
1950	3rd (Ukraine)	1	18	11	4	3	35	18	26			
1950	3rd (Ukraine)	2	3	2	0	1	4	5	4			Final group
1951	3rd (Ukraine)	1	18	13	4	1	46	10	30			
1951	3rd (Ukraine)	6	6	0	3	3	6	14	3			Final group
Original club disbanded in 1951 and revived in 1957
1957	2nd (Klass B)	16	34	6	10	18	18	55	22	1/2 finals (Zone)		
1958	2nd (Klass B)	6	30	12	10	8	35	26	34	1/4 finals (Zone)		
1959	2nd (Klass B)	4	26	15	3	8	55	31	33	1/2 finals (Zone)		
1960	2nd (Klass B)	3	36	19	9	8	69	40	47	1/2 finals (Zone)		Ukrainian Championship
1961	2nd (Klass B)	2	36	22	7	7	56	23	51			Ukrainian Championship
1961	2nd (Klass B)	4	2	0	1	1	0	2	1			Playoff
1962	2nd (Klass B)	1	24	14	5	5	52	22	33	1/4 finals (Ukraine)		
1962	2nd (Klass B)	1	10	6	4	0	22	11	16	1/4 finals (Ukraine)		Champions of Ukraine
1962	2nd (Klass B)	1	2	2	0	0	5	1	4	1/4 finals (Ukraine)		Promotional playoff; Reorganization
1963	2nd (Klass A. Vtoraya gruppa)	5	34	15	11	8	41	26	41	1/32 finals		
FC Trudovi Rezervy Luhansk merged with amateur SC Zorya Luhansk under name FC Zorya Luhansk

== European record ==
Its first European competition participation occurred in 1973–74 season in UEFA European Cup as the Soviet representative. Zorya played its first game as Zaria at its home stadium Avanhard (Avangard) on September 19, 1973, hosting the Cypriot club APOEL. After that season, the club did not participate in continental competitions for over 40 years until 2014–15 season.

=== UEFA club coefficient ranking ===
As of 18 September 2023

Rank	Team	Points
102	(Germany) Köln	6.000
103	(Germany) Hoffenheim	12.000
104	(Ukraine) Zorya Luhansk	13.500
105	(Austria) Wolfsberg	13.500
106	(Israel) Maccabi Haifa	13.000

=== Football Club Elo ranking ===
As of 14 June 2023

Rank	Team	Points
189	(Belgium) Charleroi	1501
190	(Netherlands) Vitesse	1501
191	(Ukraine) Zorya Luhansk	1501
192	(England) Hull City	1498
193	(Italy) Bari	1498
