= List of FC Dnipro seasons =

== Soviet Union ==
Season	Div.	Pos.	Pl.	W	D	L	GS	GA	P	Domestic Cup	Europe		Notes
Stal – Petrovsky Factory
1936	No participation									1/32			
Stal
1937	4th (Group G)	9	11	3	4	4	20	27	21	1/64			
club was idle in 1938
1939	2nd (Group B)	15	22	6	7	9	27	37	19	1/16			
No competitions 1940–45, World War II
1946	2nd (Second Group)	12	24	4	2	18	29	76	10				
1947	2nd (Second Group)	4	24	11	8	5	54	35	30	1/16			
1948	2nd (Second Group)	2	14	9	2	3	34	24	20				
1948	2nd (Second Group)	2	4	2	1	1	6	4	5				
Metallurg / Metalurh
1949	2nd (Second Group)	8	14	2	2	10	14	35	6	1/16			
1950	4th (Fitness teams)	10	9	3	0	6	11	22	6				withdrew
club was idle in 1951–1952
1953	2nd (Class B)	8	14	2	2	10	14	35	6	1/16			
1953	2nd (Class B)	22	2	2	0	0	5	0	4	1/16			
1954	2nd (Class B)	4	22	8	9	5	30	27	25	1/2			
1955	2nd (Class B)	10	30	14	2	14	53	47	30	1/16			
1956	2nd (Class B)	14	34	10	9	15	40	58	29	–			
1957	2nd (Class B)	4	34	17	8	9	65	43	42	1/32			
1958	2nd (Class B)	9	30	14	5	11	52	45	33	1/32			
1959	2nd (Class B)	4	28	14	6	8	47	37	34	1/128			
1960	2nd (Class B)	8	36	14	9	13	53	44	37	1/128			
1961	2nd (Class B)	14	36	11	10	15	35	40	32	1/128			
Dnepr / Dnipro
1962	2nd (Class B)	6	24	7	12	5	35	29	26	1/256			
1962	2nd (Class B)	11	10	4	3	3	10	11	10	1/256			
1963	2nd (Class A)	8	34	13	10	11	36	34	36	1/32			
1964	2nd (Class A)	10	26	8	8	10	25	28	24	1/32			(2 subgroup)
1964	2nd (Class A)	22	12	4	3	5	10	13	11	1/32			(relegation group)
1965	2nd (Class A)	5	30	13	10	7	31	23	36	1/32			(2 subgroup)
1965	2nd (Class A)	8	16	6	5	5	15	15	17	1/32			(promotion group)
1966	2nd (Class A)	8	34	11	12	11	33	27	34	1/64			(2 subgroup)
1967	2nd (Class A)	4	38	18	10	10	49	36	46	1/128			(2 subgroup)
1968	2nd (Class A)	3	40	19	16	5	50	27	54				(2 subgroup)
1969	2nd (Class A)	1	42	24	9	9	73	59	57	1/64			(3 subgroup)
1969	2nd (Class A)	2	3	1	1	1	2	3	3	1/64			(finals)
1970	2nd (Class A)	3	42	26	9	7	58	25	61	1/64			
1971	2nd (First League)	1	42	27	9	6	83	30	63	1/16			Promoted
1972	1st (Top League)	6	30	12	10	8	37	37	34	1/8			
1973	1st (Top League)	8	30	9	9	12	36	40	26	1/2			
1974	1st (Top League)	10	30	9	11	10	31	39	29	1/4			
1975	1st (Top League)	7	30	10	11	9	33	30	31	1/16			
1976	1st (Top League)	11	15	6	2	7	18	18	14	1/2			spring half
1976	1st (Top League)	13	15	6	2	7	12	17	14	1/2			fall half
1977	1st (Top League)	12	30	9	9	12	24	31	27	1/8			
1978	1st (Top League)	16	30	9	3	18	25	39	21	1/16			Relegated
1979	2nd (First League)	17	46	16	14	16	57	60	44	Group stage			
1980	2nd (First League)	2	46	27	8	11	60	47	62	Group stage			Promoted
1981	1st (Top League)	8	34	12	8	14	42	53	32	Group stage			
1982	1st (Top League)	9	34	11	12	11	34	38	32	1/2			
1983	1st (Top League)	1	34	22	5	7	63	36	49	1/4			
1984	1st (Top League)	3	34	17	8	9	54	40	42	1/8	ECL	1/4	
1985	1st (Top League)	3	34	16	11	7	71	41	42	1/4	UC	1/8	
1986	1st (Top League)	11	30	8	12	10	41	41	28	1/16	UC	1st round	
1987	1st (Top League)	2	30	15	9	6	42	22	39	1/16			
1988	1st (Top League)	1	30	18	10	2	49	23	46	1/2	UC	1st round	
1989	1st (Top League)	2	30	18	6	6	47	27	42	Winner	ECL	1/4	
1990	1st (Top League)	6	24	11	6	7	39	26	28	1/16 finals	UC	1st round	
1991	1st (Top League)	9	30	9	10	11	31	36	28	1/8 finals			
1992	No championship									1/8 finals			

== Ukraine ==
Season	Div.	Pos.	Pl.	W	D	L	GS	GA	P	Domestic Cup	Other		Notes
Dnipro
1992	1st (Top League)	3	18	10	3	5	26	15	23	1/4 finals			Won playoff game for the third place over Shakhtar
1992–93	1st (Top League)	2	30	18	8	4	51	20	44	1/8 finals			
1993–94	1st (Top League)	4	34	16	9	9	53	35	41	1/4 finals	UC	2nd round	
1994–95	1st (Top League)	3	34	19	8	7	60	33	65	Runner-up			
1995–96	1st (Top League)	3	34	19	6	9	65	34	63	1/4 finals			
1996–97	1st (Top League)	4	30	14	13	3	48	19	55	Runner-up			
1997–98	1st (Top League)	4	30	17	4	9	47	27	55	1/4 finals	UC	2nd qual round	
1998–99	1st (Top League)	12	30	9	5	16	28	46	32	1/8 finals			
1999–00	1st (Top League)	11	30	8	9	13	26	52	33	1/8 finals			
2000–01	1st (Top League)	3	26	17	4	5	37	18	55	1/2 finals			
2001–02	1st (Top League)	6	26	11	7	8	30	20	40	1/2 finals	UC	1st round	
2002–03	1st (Top League)	4	30	18	5	7	48	27	59	1/2 finals			
2003–04	1st (Top League)	3	30	16	9	5	44	23	57	Runner-up	UC	3rd round	
2004–05	1st (Top League)	4	30	13	9	8	38	34	48	1/2 finals	UC	Round of 32	
2005–06	1st (Top League)	6	30	11	10	9	33	23	43	1/8 finals	UC	Group stage	
2006–07	1st (Top League)	4	30	11	14	5	32	24	47	1/4 finals			
2007–08	1st (Top League)	4	30	18	5	7	40	27	59	1/16 finals	UC	1st round	
2008–09	1st (Premier League)	6	30	13	9	8	34	25	48	1/8 finals	UC	2nd qual round	
2009–10	1st (Premier League)	4	30	15	9	6	48	25	54	1/4 finals			
2010–11	1st (Premier League)	4	30	16	9	5	46	20	57	1/2 finals	EL	Play-off Round	
2011–12	1st (Premier League)	4	30	15	7	8	52	35	52	1/8 finals	EL	Play-off Round	
2012–13	1st (Premier League)	4	30	16	8	6	54	27	56	1/2 finals	EL	Round of 32	
2013–14	1st (Premier League)	2	28	18	5	5	56	28	59	1/8 finals	EL	Round of 32	
2014–15	1st (Premier League)	3	26	16	6	4	47	17	54	1/2 finals	EL	Runner-up	
2015–16	1st (Premier League)	3	25	16	4	5	49	21	52	1/2 finals	EL	Group stage	
2016–17	1st (Premier League)	11	32	8	13	11	31	40	13	1/2 finals	Excluded		−24 Relegated directly to second league
2017–18	3rd (Second League)	8	33	16	7	10	57	34	37	First Round			−18 Relegated
2018–19	4th (Amateur League)	8	22	10	3	9	35	27	24	Amateur Cup	UAC	1/2 finals	–9
