= 1988 Soviet First League =

Soviet First League
- Season: 1988
- Champions: Pamir Dushanbe
- Promoted: Pamir Dushanbe; Rotor Volgograd
- Relegated: Zorya Voroshylovhrad; Zvezda Perm; Kolos Nikopol
- Top goalscorer: (22) Mukhsin Mukhamadiyev (Pamir Dushanbe) and Aleksandr Nikitin (Rotor Volgograd)

The 1988 Soviet First League was the 49th season of the second tier of association football in the Soviet Union.

== Teams ==
=== Promoted teams ===
- SC Tavriya Simferopol – Winner of the Second League finals (returning after an absence of 3 seasons)
- FC Kuban Krasnodar – Winner of the Second League finals (returning after an absence of a season)
- FC Zvezda Perm – Winner of the Second League finals (returning after an absence of 8 seasons)

=== Relegated teams ===
- CSKA Moscow – (Returning after a season)
- FC Guria Lanchkhuti – (Returning after a season)

=== Locations ===
Location of teams in the 1988 Soviet First League.

== League standings ==
Pos	Team	Pld	W	D	L	GF	GA	GD	Pts	Promotion or relegation
1	(Tajik Soviet Socialist Republic) Pamir Dushanbe (C, P)	42	24	10	8	78	44	+34	58	Promotion to Top League
2	(Russian Soviet Federative Socialist Republic) Rotor Volgograd (P)	42	25	7	10	76	37	+39	57	Promotion to Top League
3	(Russian Soviet Federative Socialist Republic) CSKA Moscow	42	23	10	9	69	35	+34	56	
4	(Georgian Soviet Socialist Republic) Guria Lanchkhuti	42	23	7	12	71	44	+27	53	
5	(Uzbek Soviet Socialist Republic) Pakhtakor Tashkent	42	21	10	11	64	38	+26	52	
6	(Russian Soviet Federative Socialist Republic) Dynamo Stavropol	42	18	11	13	59	46	+13	47	
7	(Ukrainian Soviet Socialist Republic) SKA Karpaty Lviv	42	18	8	16	51	39	+12	44	
8	(Latvian Soviet Socialist Republic) Daugava Riga	42	18	7	17	56	54	+2	43	
9	(Russian Soviet Federative Socialist Republic) SKA Rostov-on-Don	42	16	10	16	57	64	−7	42	
10	(Russian Soviet Federative Socialist Republic) Rostselmash Rostov-on-Don	42	16	8	18	59	67	−8	40	
11	(Russian Soviet Federative Socialist Republic) Shinnik Yaroslavl	42	16	8	18	48	48	0	40	
12	(Russian Soviet Federative Socialist Republic) Geolog Tyumen	42	17	5	20	46	58	−12	39	
13	(Russian Soviet Federative Socialist Republic) Spartak Ordjonikidze	42	15	9	18	57	60	−3	39	
14	(Ukrainian Soviet Socialist Republic) Tavriya Simferopol	42	13	14	15	34	43	−9	38 (Note: There was a draw limit for the draws earned, 12. Only twelve draws earn a point, in contrast, over the limit draws earn no points.)	
15	(Russian Soviet Federative Socialist Republic) Kuzbass Kemerevo	42	13	14	15	38	39	−1	38	
16	(Georgian Soviet Socialist Republic) Dinamo Batumi	42	15	6	21	40	53	−13	36	
17	(Ukrainian Soviet Socialist Republic) Metalurh Zaporizhia	42	12	13	17	30	43	−13	36	
18	(Armenian Soviet Socialist Republic) Kotayk Abovyan	42	14	7	21	55	83	−28	35	
19	(Russian Soviet Federative Socialist Republic) Kuban Krasnodar	42	12	11	19	41	56	−15	35	
20	(Ukrainian Soviet Socialist Republic) Zarya Voroshylovhrad (R)	42	11	10	21	44	59	−15	32	Relegation to Second League
21	(Russian Soviet Federative Socialist Republic) Zvezda Perm (R)	42	10	12	20	37	69	−32	32	Relegation to Second League
22	(Ukrainian Soviet Socialist Republic) Kolos Nikopol (R)	42	10	7	25	31	62	−31	27	Relegation to Second League

Source: RSSSF
(C) Champions; (P) Promoted; (R) Relegated

== Top scorers ==
#	Player	Club	Goals
1	Mukhsin Mukhamadiyev	Pamir Dushanbe	22
1	Aleksandr Nikitin	Rotor Volgograd	22
3	Viktor Khlus	Guria Lanchkhuti	21
4	Valeriy Korneyev	Dynamo Stavropol	19
4	Merab Zhordania	Guria Lanchkhuti	19
6	Sergei Andreyev	Rostselmash Rostov-on-Don	18
6	Jevgenijs Milevskis	Daugava Riga	18
6	Hamlet Mkhitaryan	Kotayk Abovian	18
9	Oleksandr Malyshenko	Zorya Voroshylovhrad	17

== Number of teams by union republic ==
Rank	Union republic	Number of teams	Club(s)
1	RSFSR	11	Rotor Volgograd, CSKA Moscow, Dinamo Stavropol, SKA Rostov-na-Donu, Rostselmash Rostov-na-Donu, Shinnik Yaroslavl, Geolog Tyumen, Spartak Vladikavkaz, Kuzbass Kemerovo, Kuban Krasnodar, Zvezda Perm
2	Ukrainian SSR	5	Metallurg Zaporozhye, Tavriya Simferopol, SKA Karpaty Lvov, Zaria Voroshilovgrad, Kolos Nikopol
3	Georgian SSR	2	Guria Lanchkhuti, Dinamo Batumi
4	Uzbek SSR	1	Pakhtakor Tashkent
4	Latvian SSR	1	Daugava Riga
4	Tajik SSR	1	Pamir Dushanbe
4	Armenian SSR	1	Kotaik Abovian

== Attendances ==
No.	Club	Average	Highest
1	Paxtakor	35,581	50,000
2	Pamir	20,000	20,000
3	Rotor	16,429	29,000
4	Guria	15,795	20,000
5	Stavropol	14,848	18,500
6	Zarya	13,129	30,600
7	Spartak Vladikavkaz	12,586	22,500
8	Rostov-on-Don	9,981	32,000
9	Batumi	9,576	14,000
10	Tyumen	9,229	15,000
11	Kuzbass	9,176	25,000
12	Zvezda Perm	8,248	20,000
13	Karpaty	7,924	37,000
14	Rostselmash	7,605	16,000
15	Kuban	7,267	18,000
16	Tavriya	6,562	10,100
17	PFC CSKA	5,500	11,500
18	Shinnik	4,967	13,000
19	Metalurh	4,952	18,000
20	Kotayk	4,619	7,000
21	Kolos Nikopol	2,324	7,000
22	Daugava	2,233	5,800

== See also ==
- Soviet First League
