= List of FC Karpaty Lviv seasons =

== Soviet Union ==
| Season | Div. | Pos. | Pl. | W | D | L | GS | GA | P | Domestic Cup | Europe | | Notes |
|---|---|---|---|---|---|---|---|---|---|---|---|---|---|
| 1963 | Vtoraya gruppa (Class A) | 7 | 34 | 14 | 11 | 9 | 28 | 22 | 39 | 1/32 finals | | | |
| 1964 | Vtoraya gruppa (Class A) | 4 | 26 | 10 | 8 | 8 | 32 | 27 | 28 | 1/16 finals | | | Second subgroup |
| 1964 | Vtoraya gruppa (Class A) | 10 | 26 | 8 | 8 | 10 | 29 | 36 | 24 | 1/16 finals | | | 1–14 places tournament |
| 1965 | Vtoraya gruppa (Class A) | 7 | 30 | 11 | 11 | 8 | 36 | 22 | 33 | 1/16 finals | | | Second subgroup |
| 1965 | Vtoraya gruppa (Class A) | 9 | 30 | 10 | 10 | 10 | 29 | 25 | 30 | 1/16 finals | | | 1–14 places tournament |
| 1966 | Vtoraya gruppa (Class A) | 14 | 34 | 8 | 14 | 12 | 23 | 23 | 30 | 1/16 finals | | | Second subgroup |
| 1967 | Vtoraya gruppa (Class A) | 7 | 38 | 17 | 8 | 13 | 50 | 38 | 42 | 1/32 finals | | | Second subgroup |
| 1968 | Vtoraya gruppa (Class A) | 1 | 40 | 26 | 7 | 7 | 80 | 34 | 59 | 1/64 finals | | | First subgroup |
| 1968 | Vtoraya gruppa (Class A) | 2 | 3 | 1 | 1 | 1 | 5 | 2 | 3 | 1/64 finals | | | Promotion tournament |
| 1969 | Vtoraya gruppa (Class A) | 6 | 42 | 17 | 12 | 13 | 63 | 50 | 46 | Winner | | | Third subgroup |
| 1970 | Pervaya gruppa (Class A) | 1 | 42 | 26 | 11 | 5 | 70 | 22 | 63 | 1/64 finals | CWC | First round | Promoted |
| 1971 | Vysshaya Liga | 10 | 30 | 5 | 18 | 7 | 30 | 35 | 28 | 1/8 finals | | | |
| 1972 | Vysshaya Liga | 14 | 30 | 8 | 8 | 14 | 27 | 43 | 24 | 1/2 finals | | | |
| 1973 | Vysshaya Liga | 14 | 30 | 8 | 3+3 | 16 | 28 | 48 | 19 | 1/16 finals | | | |
| 1974 | Vysshaya Liga | 11 | 30 | 8 | 12 | 10 | 33 | 33 | 28 | 1/16 finals | | | |
| 1975 | Vysshaya Liga | 6 | 30 | 11 | 10 | 9 | 36 | 28 | 32 | 1/8 finals | | | |
| 1976 | Vysshaya Liga | 4 | 15 | 7 | 4 | 4 | 25 | 19 | 18 | 1/4 finals | | | Spring |
| 1976 | Vysshaya Liga | 4 | 15 | 6 | 5 | 4 | 22 | 19 | 17 | 1/4 finals | | | Fall |
| 1977 | Vysshaya Liga | 15 | 30 | 6 | 14 | 10 | 26 | 30 | 26 | 1/8 finals | | | Relegated |
| 1978 | Pervaya Liga | 4 | 38 | 21 | 10 | 7 | 60 | 37 | 52 | 1/16 finals | | | |
| 1979 | Pervaya Liga | 1 | 46 | 27 | 10 | 9 | 89 | 43 | 64 | 1/2 finals | | | Promoted |
| 1980 | Vysshaya Liga | 17 | 34 | 9 | 8 | 17 | 23 | 46 | 26 | Group stage | | | Relegated |
| 1981 | Pervaya Liga | 11 | 46 | 17 | 10 | 19 | 57 | 60 | 44 | Group stage | | | merged with SKA Lvov |
played as SKA Karpaty (1982–88)
| 1989 | Vtoraya Liga | 3 | 42 | 24 | 10 | 8 | 63 | 34 | 58 | no participation | | | 5th Group Revival |
| 1990 | Vtoraya Liga | 3 | 42 | 23 | 9 | 10 | 61 | 36 | 55 | 1/8 finals | | | West Zone |
| 1991 | Vtoraya Liga | 1 | 42 | 24 | 11 | 7 | 47 | 27 | 59 | 1/32 finals | | | West Zone Promoted |

== Ukraine ==
| Season | Div. | Pos. | Pl. | W | D | L | GS | GA | P | Domestic Cup | Europe | | Notes |
|---|---|---|---|---|---|---|---|---|---|---|---|---|---|
| 1992 | 1st (Vyshcha Liha "A") | 6_{/10} | 18 | 5 | 6 | 7 | 15 | 18 | 16 | 1/8 finals | - | - | two groups |
| 1992–93 | 1st (Vyshcha Liha) | 6_{/16} | 30 | 10 | 10 | 10 | 37 | 38 | 30 | Runner-up | - | - | - |
| 1993–94 | 1st (Vyshcha Liha) | 5_{/18} | 34 | 16 | 8 | 10 | 37 | 30 | 40 | 1/2 finals | CWC | Qual round | - |
| 1994–95 | 1st (Vyshcha Liha) | 8_{/18} | 34 | 12 | 9 | 13 | 32 | 36 | 45 | 1/8 finals | - | - | - |
| 1995–96 | 1st (Vyshcha Liha) | 8_{/18} | 34 | 12 | 10 | 12 | 39 | 39 | 46 | 1/8 finals | - | - | - |
| 1996–97 | 1st (Vyshcha Liha) | 5_{/16} | 30 | 15 | 7 | 8 | 36 | 23 | 52 | 1/4 finals | - | - | - |
| 1997–98 | 1st (Vyshcha Liha) | 3_{/16} | 30 | 16 | 9 | 5 | 36 | 20 | 57 | 1/8 finals | - | - | - |
| 1998–99 | 1st (Vyshcha Liha) | 4_{/16} | 30 | 15 | 10 | 5 | 54 | 34 | 55 | Runner-up | - | - | - |
| 1999–00 | 1st (Vyshcha Liha) | 9_{/16} | 30 | 12 | 4 | 14 | 39 | 38 | 40 | 1/4 finals | UC | 1st round | - |
| 2000–01 | 1st (Vyshcha Liha) | 10_{/14} | 26 | 9 | 3 | 14 | 33 | 42 | 30 | 1/16 finals | - | - | - |
| 2001–02 | 1st (Vyshcha Liha) | 8_{/14} | 26 | 7 | 8 | 11 | 19 | 31 | 29 | 1/4 finals | - | - | - |
| 2002–03 | 1st (Vyshcha Liha) | 7_{/16} | 30 | 9 | 9 | 12 | 29 | 37 | 36 | 1/16 finals | - | - | - |
| 2003–04 | 1st (Vyshcha Liha) | 15_{/16} | 30 | 6 | 8 | 16 | 22 | 39 | 26 | 1/32 finals | - | - | Relegated |
| 2004–05 | 2nd (Persha Liha) | 6_{/18} | 34 | 15 | 7 | 12 | 39 | 35 | 52 | 1/8 finals | - | - | - |
| 2005–06 | 2nd (Persha Liha) | 2_{/18} | 34 | 25 | 5 | 3 | 53 | 14 | 80 | 1/2 finals | - | - | Promoted |
| 2006–07 | 1st(Vyshcha Liha) | 8_{/16} | 30 | 9 | 10 | 11 | 26 | 32 | 37 | 1/16 finals | - | - | - |
| 2007–08 | 1st(Vyshcha Liha) | 10_{/16} | 30 | 9 | 6 | 15 | 29 | 41 | 33 | 1/32 finals | - | - | - |
| 2008–09 | 1st(Premier Liha) | 9_{/16} | 30 | 8 | 10 | 12 | 33 | 39 | 34 | 1/16 finals | - | - | - |
| 2009–10 | 1st(Premier Liha) | 5_{/16} | 30 | 13 | 11 | 6 | 44 | 35 | 50 | 1/8 finals | - | - | - |
| 2010–11 | 1st(Premier Liha) | 5_{/16} | 30 | 13 | 9 | 8 | 41 | 34 | 48 | 1/4 finals | EL | Group Stage | - |
| 2011–12 | 1st(Premier Liha) | 14_{/16} | 30 | 5 | 8 | 17 | 27 | 51 | 23 | 1/2 finals | EL | Play-off round | - |
| 2012–13 | 1st(Premier Liha) | 14_{/16} | 30 | 7 | 6 | 17 | 37 | 52 | 27 | 1/4 finals | - | - | - |
| 2013–14 | 1st(Premier Liha) | 11_{/16} | 28 | 7 | 11 | 10 | 33 | 39 | 32 | 1/8 finals | - | - | - |
| 2014–15 | 1st(Premier Liha) | 13_{/14} | 26 | 5 | 9 | 12 | 22 | 31 | 15 | 1/8 finals | - | - | −9 |
| 2015–16 | 1st(Premier Liha) | 7_{/14} | 26 | 8 | 6 | 12 | 26 | 37 | 30 | 1/16 finals | - | - | - |
| 2016–17 | 1st(Premier Liha) | 10_{/12} | 32 | 9 | 9 | 14 | 35 | 41 | 30 | 1/8 finals | - | - | −6 |
| 2017–18 | 1st(Premier Liha) | 8_{/12} | 32 | 8 | 13 | 11 | 28 | 45 | 37 | 1/16 finals | - | - | - |
| 2018–19 | 1st(Premier Liha) | 10_{/12} | 32 | 8 | 9 | 15 | 44 | 53 | 33 | 1/4 finals | - | - | - |
| 2019–20 | 1st(Premier Liha) | 12_{/12} | 32 | 2 | 9 | 21 | 19 | 48 | 15 | 1/16 finals | - | - | Excluded |
Karpaty Lviv of Smaliychuk
| 2020–21 | 3rd(Druha Liha "A") | 13_{/13} | 24 | 3 | 4 | 17 | 20 | 55 | 13 | 1/64 finals | - | - | Withdrew |
Karpaty Lviv of Yurchyshyn
| 2020–21 | 4th(Amatorska Liha "A") | 4_{/9} | 16 | 7 | 4 | 5 | 23 | 16 | 25 | - | - | - | Promoted |
| 2021–22 | 3rd(Druha Liha "A") | 1_{/15} | 18 | 16 | 0 | 2 | 46 | 7 | 48 | 1/32 finals | - | - | Promoted |
| 2022–23 | 2nd(Persha Liha "A") | 2_{/8} | 14 | 9 | 1 | 4 | 22 | 13 | 28 | no competition | - | - | to Promotion group |
| 2022–23 | 2nd(Persha Liha "A") | 5_{/8} | 14 | 5 | 3 | 6 | 12 | 16 | 18 | no competition | - | - | |
| 2023–24 | 2nd(Persha Liha "A") | 1_{/8} | 18 | 14 | 3 | 1 | 34 | 10 | 45 | 1/64 finals | - | - | to Promotion group |
| 2023–24 | 2nd(Persha Liha "A") | 2_{/8} | 28 | 20 | 5 | 3 | 49 | 20 | 65 | 1/64 finals | - | - | Promotion to UPL |
| 2024–25 | 1st(Premier Liha) | 6 | 30 | 13 | 7 | 10 | 42 | 36 | 46 | 1/8 finals | - | - | - |
| 2025–26 | 1st(Premier Liha) | 9 | 30 | 10 | 11 | 9 | 40 | 31 | 41 | 1/16 finals | - | - | - |
| 2026–27 | 1st(Premier Liha) | 5 | 10 | 4 | 4 | 2 | 17 | 8 | 16 | 1/4 finals | - | - | TBD |
