= Nosko =

Nosko (Ukrainian: Носко), a surname of Slavic origin. It occurs in the descriptions of the Ukrainian lands of the 16th century as well as in the Cossack Registry of the year 1649. The surname may refer to:

- Eugen Nosko (1938), German photographer
- Ernő Noskó (1945), Hungarian footballer
- Hryhoriy Nosko (1910–1980), Ukrainian Soviet footballer
- Ján Nosko (1988), Slovak footballer
- Andrej Nosko (1981), Slovak political scientist
