= German Zonin =

Soviet footballer and coach (1926–2021)

- Zonin in 1972

Personal information
- Full name: German Semyonovich Zonin
- Date of birth: 9 September 1926
- Place of birth: Kazan, Russian SFSR, Soviet Union
- Date of death: 26 November 2021 (aged 95)
- Place of death: Saint Petersburg, Russia
- Height: 1.76 m (5 ft 9 in)
- Position: Defender

Youth career
- 1941–1944: FC Dynamo Kazan

Senior career*
Years	Team	Apps	(Gls)
1945–1949	FC Dynamo Kazan		
1949–1953	Dynamo Leningrad	20	(0)
1954–1955	FC Trudovyye Rezervy Leningrad	24	(0)

Managerial career
- 1957–1959: FC Trudovyye Rezervy Leningrad (youth)
- 1959–1960: FC Trudovyye Rezervy Leningrad
- 1960–1961: Trud Voronezh
- 1962–1964: Zorya Luhansk
- 1965–1967: Burma
- 1969–1972: Zorya Voroshylovhrad
- 1972: Soviet Union
- 1973–1977: Zenit Leningrad
- 1979–1980: SKA Rostov
- 1985: SKA Rostov (consultant)
- 1987–1988: Dinamo Tbilisi
- 1992–1993: FC Torpedo Volzhsky (consultant)
- 1996: FC Kareliya-Erzi Petrozavodsk (consultant)
- * Club domestic league appearances and goals

German Semyonovich Zonin (Russian: Герман Семёнович Зонин; 9 September 1926 – 26 November 2021) was a Soviet and Russian football coach and player.

He died on 26 November 2021, at the age of 95.

== Honours ==
- 1966 Asain Game champion with Burma
- 1972 Soviet Top League champion with Zarya Voroshilovgrad.
