= Oleksiy Chystyakov =

Ukrainian footballer and coach

Personal information
- Full name: Oleksiy Oleksiyovych Chystyakov
- Date of birth: 3 August 1974 (age 52)
- Place of birth: Ivanovo, Ivanovo Oblast, Russian SFSR
- Height: 1.78 m (5 ft 10 in)
- Position: Midfielder

Youth career
- Kolos Nikopol
- DVUFK Dnipropetrovsk

Senior career*
Years	Team	Apps	(Gls)
1992–1994	Dynamo Luhansk	52	(3)
1994	Zorya-MALS Luhansk	7	(0)
1995	Gekris Anapa	10	(0)
1995	Kuban Slavyansk-na-Kubani	14	(1)
1996–1998	Metalurh Novomoskovsk	48	(4)
1998	Metalurh-2 Zaporizhzhia	2	(0)
1999	Ivanovo	9	(0)
Total		142	(8)

Managerial career
- 2000–2001: FC Dnipro-4 Dnipropetrovsk (assistant)
- 2002: Dnipro-3 Dnipropetrovsk (assistant)
- 2003: Stal Dniprodzerzhynsk
- 2003: Zorya Luhansk (assistant)
- 2003: Zorya Luhansk (interim)
- 2004: Uholyok Dymytrov (assistant)
- 2005–2014: Dnipro Dnipropetrovsk (academy)
- 2015–2016: Dnipro (vice-director of sport)
- 2017: Chornomorets Odesa U-21
- 2017: Chornomorets Odesa (caretaker)
- * Club domestic league appearances and goals

Oleksiy Chystyakov (Ukrainian: Олексій Олексійович Чистяков; born 3 August 1974) is a retired Ukrainian football player and current coach.

== Career ==
Chystyakov is a product of FC Kolos Nikopol and DVUFK Dnipropetrovsk youth sportive school systems. His first trainers were Oleksandr Borovykov and Ihor Blazhevskyi (in Kolos) and Volodymyr Kobzarev (in DVUFK).

In 1992, he started his football career at FC Dynamo Luhansk, where he was invited to Zorya Luhansk in the summer of 1994. In 1995, he went to Russia, where he defended the colors of the clubs of Gekris Anapa and FC Kuban Slavyansk-na-Kubani. In September 1996, he returned to Ukraine and became a player in FC Metalurh Novomoskovsk. In the summer of 1998, he went to FC Metalurh-2 Zaporizhzhia, but by the verdict of the doctors he was forced to end his football career in the young age.
