= Anatoliy Kuksov =

Soviet footballer (1949–2022)

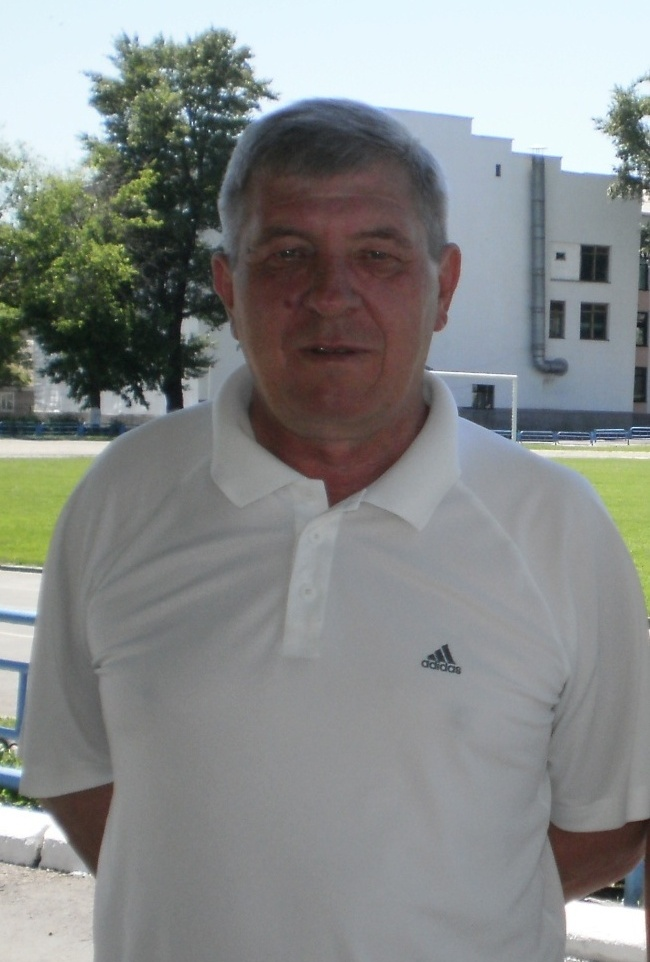

Personal information
- Full name: Anatoliy Yakovlevich Kuksov
- Date of birth: 21 November 1949
- Place of birth: Voroshilovhrad, Soviet Union (now Ukraine)
- Date of death: January 2022 (aged 72)
- Place of death: Luhansk, Ukraine
- Position: Midfielder

Youth career
- 1959–1966: Trudovi Rezervy Luhansk

Senior career*
Years	Team	Apps	(Gls)
1966–1985	Zorya Voroshilovhrad	489	(87)

International career
1972	USSR	8	(0)

Managerial career
- 1986–1990: Zorya Voroshilovhrad (assistant)
- 1990–1993: Zorya Luhansk
- 1994: Metalurh Zaporizhzhia
- 1995–1996: Azovets Mariupol
- 1996–1997: Zorya Luhansk
- 2001–2003: Avanhard Rovenky
- 2007–2008: Komunalnyk Luhansk
- 2010–2013: Hirnyk Rovenky
- 2015: Luhansk People's Republic
- * Club domestic league appearances and goals

Olympic medal record

Representing Soviet Union

Men's Football
Bronze medal – third place	1972 Munich	Team competition

Anatoliy Yakovych Kuksov (Ukrainian: Анатолій Якович Куксов; 21 November 1949 – January 2022) was a Soviet football player and a Ukrainian coach. He is the most capped player for FC Zorya Luhansk with just about a dozen matches shy of 500, one of the best scorers and one of the longest serving coaches of the club.

In 2007–08 Kuksov tried to create another professional club in city FC Komunalnyk Luhansk which folded within a couple of seasons. In 2015 he became a coach of the Russian-occupied Luhansk region team.

== International career ==
Kuksov made his debut for the USSR national team on 2 July 1972 in a friendly against Argentina.

Five of eight games for the Soviet team, Kuksov played at the 1972 Olympic football competition.

== Personal life and death ==
His grandson is the volleyball player Dmytro Filippov. Kuksov died in Luhansk in January 2022, at the age of 72.

== Honours ==
- Soviet Top League: 1972
- Summer Olympics: 1972; olympic bronze
