= Valeriy Galustov =

Soviet footballer (1939–2017)

Personal information
- Full name: Valeriy Zavenovich Galustov
- Date of birth: 9 January 1939
- Place of birth: Azerbaijan
- Date of death: 18 May 2017 (aged 78)
- Place of death: Ukraine
- Position: Midfielder

Senior career*
Years	Team	Apps	(Gls)
1956	Neftqaz Bakı		
1957–1958	Khimik Sievierodonetsk		
1959–1963	Zorya Luhansk	157	(13)
1964	Dynamo Kyiv	0	(0)
1964–1968	Zorya Luhansk	172	(17)
- * Club domestic league appearances and goals

Valeriy Zavenovich Galustov (Russian: Валерий Галустов; 9 January 1939 – 18 May 2017) was a Soviet footballer who played as a midfielder for Zorya Luhansk.

== Career ==
Galustov captained Ukrainian side Zorya Luhansk. He mainly operated as a midfielder and was known for his shooting ability and passing ability.

== Post-playing career ==
Galustov was part of the meeting that founded the Luhansk People's Republic national football team.

== Managerial career ==
After retiring from professional football, Galustov worked as a coach, helping Ukrainian side Zorya Luhansk win the league.

== Personal life ==
In 1972, Galustov was awarded the Honored Coach of the Ukrainian SSR.

Galustov died on 18 May 2017 in Ukraine.
