= Oleksandr Zhuravlyov =

Soviet footballer and Ukrainian coach

Personal information
- Full name: Oleksandr Nykyforovych Zhuravlyov
- Date of birth: 1 September 1945 (age 81)
- Place of birth: Luhansk, Ukrainian SSR
- Positions: Defender; midfielder

Youth career
- Trudovye Rezervy Luhansk

Senior career*
Years	Team	Apps	(Gls)
1967–1969	Zorya Voloshilovgrad		
1970	FC Shakhtar Kadiyivka		
1970–1979	Zorya Voroshilovgrad		

International career
1972	USSR	3	(0)

Managerial career
- 1995: FC Zorya Luhansk
- * Club domestic league appearances and goals

Oleksandr Nykyforovych Zhuravlyov (Ukrainian: Олександр Никифорович Журавльов, Russian: Александр Никифорович Журавлёв); (born 1 September 1945 in Luhansk) is a retired Soviet football player and a Ukrainian coach.

== Honours ==
- Soviet Top League winner: 1972.

== International career ==
Zhuravlyov made his debut for USSR on 29 June 1972 in a friendly against Uruguay. He was the team's captain for the 3 games he played.
