= Yevhen Heller =

Ukrainian politician

- Евгений Борисович Геллер
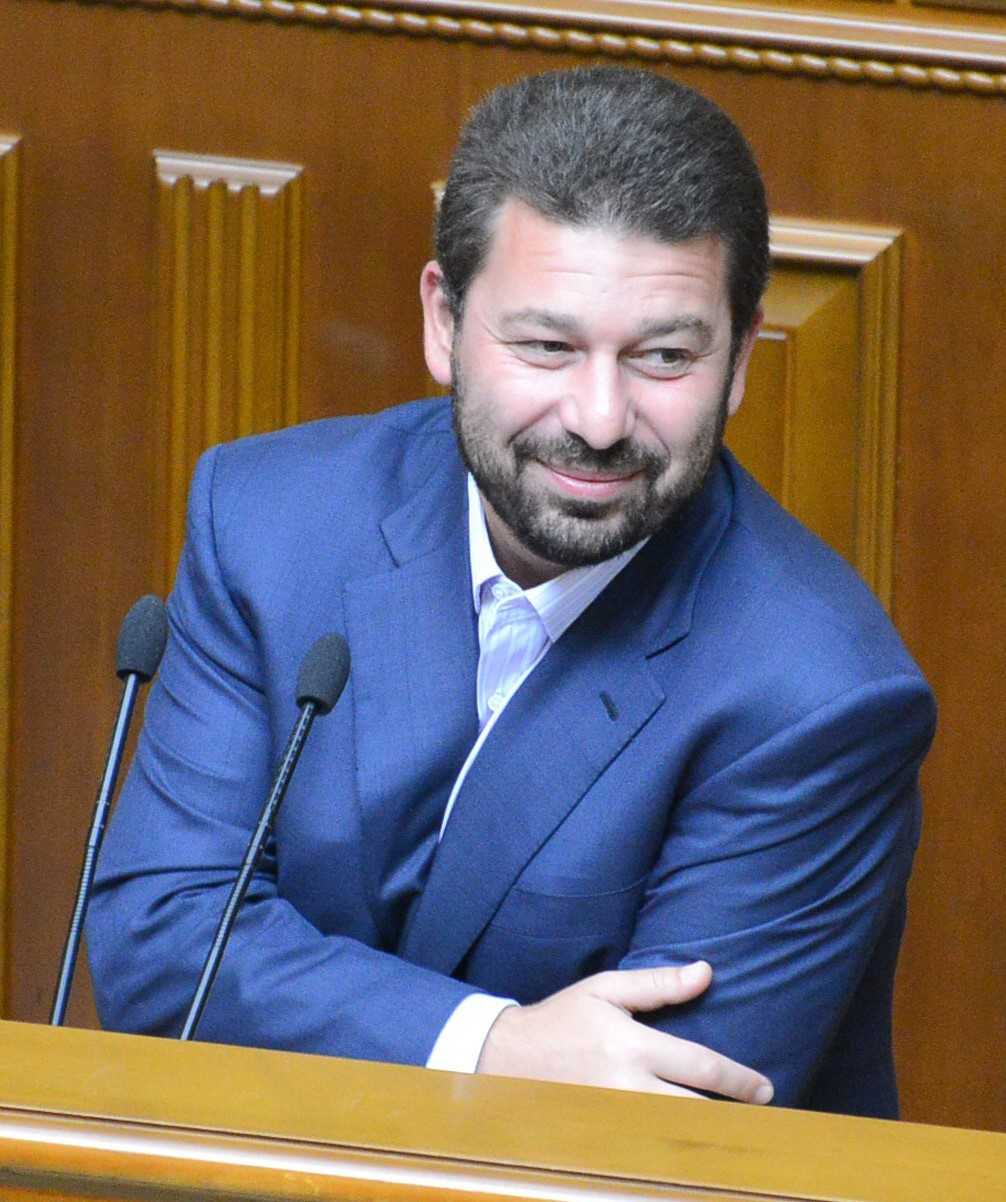
- Heller in 2010
- Born: Yevgeniy Borisovich Geller; 12 May 1974 (age 52); Donetsk, Ukrainian SSR
- Education: graduate
- Alma mater: Donetsk National Technical University
- Occupation: politician
- Political party: Independent (2014–); Party of Regions (2006–2014)

Yevhen Heller (Ukrainian: Євген Борисович Гєллєр; born 12 May 1974 in Donetsk, Ukrainian SSR) is a Ukrainian public figure, former People's Deputy of Ukraine, president of FC Zorya Luhansk (since 2009) and owner of "Ukrsplav" (non-ferrous metal recycling company). In various media his last name also spells through Russian transliteration as Geller.

== Early life ==
A native of Donetsk, Heller graduated the Donetsk State Technical University as engineer-economist, "Economy and administration in machine building". During his education, he worked in several companies on leading positions. Soon after graduation Heller was hired to the newly created (in 1997) company "Ukrsplav" as a director of commerce and worked there until 2004.

== Sports ownership ==
In 2004-06 Heller was a president of the futsal club Shakhtar Donetsk. After becoming a politician, he transferred all his business to his business partner Spartak Kokotyukha. Soon after the death of Valeriy Bukayev in 2009, Heller managed to obtain the Ukrainian Premier League football club FC Zorya Luhansk from Bukayev's wife, Marina.

== Political career ==
Since 2006 Heller is a Ukrainian parliamentary first for Party of Regions (until 2014) and then as independent currently in a parliamentary faction of the Revival Party. While being a member of Party of Regions, he was part of the Voropayev political group which aligned itself after Yuriy Voropayev. Until 2014 Heller was elected to the Ukrainian parliament (Verkhovna Rada) on a party list of Party of Regions, while in 2014 he successfully ran independently in Donetsk Oblast district #50 and was elected to the parliament once again. In the 2019 Ukrainian parliamentary election Heller was placed 12th on the election list of the Opposition Bloc. But although the party won 6 single-seat constituencies its nationwide list won 3.23% of the votes meaning it did not overcome the 5% election barrier.

== Personal life ==
Heller is married and has a child. His wife Tetiana also works in "Ukrsplav" as an economist.
