= Serhiy Yarmolych =

Ukrainian footballer (born 1963)

Personal information
- Full name: Serhiy Fedorovych Yarmolych
- Date of birth: 27 November 1963 (age 62)
- Place of birth: Karelian ASSR, Soviet Union
- Height: 1.78 m (5 ft 10 in)
- Position: Defender

Youth career
- LVUFK Voroshilovgrad

Senior career*
Years	Team	Apps	(Gls)
1981	Zarya Voroshilovgrad	0	(0)
1982–1983	Tsement Novorossiysk	58	(4)
1984–1989	Zarya Voroshilovgrad	230	(14)
1989	Chernomorets Odessa	0	(0)
1990	Zarya Lugansk	42	(6)
1991	Metallurg Zaporozhye	16	(0)
1992	Zorya-MALS Luhansk	17	(0)
1993	Hallescher FC		
1993	Wacker Nordhausen	18	(1)
1994	Zorya-MALS Luhansk	13	(0)
1994	Metalurh Zaporizhya	7	(0)
1994–1995	Dynamo Luhansk	32	(3)
1995	Chernomorets Novorossiysk	2	(0)
1995	Zorya-MALS Luhansk	9	(0)
1996	Avanhard-Industriya Rovenky	9	(0)
1996–1997	Metalurh Mariupol	17	(3)
1998	Neman Mosty	1	(0)
1999	Kajaanin Haka		
2000	Urozhay Chertkovo	22	(5)
2001–2003	Mir-Dongazdobycha Sulin		
2003	Shakhtar Sverdlovsk	2	(0)
2005–2006	Mir-Dongazdobycha Sulin		

Managerial career
- 2006: Mir-Dongazdobycha Sulin (assistant)
- 2007: Dongazdobycha Sulin (consultant)
- * Club domestic league appearances and goals

Serhiy Fedorovych Yarmolych (Ukrainian: Сергій Федорович Ярмолич; born 27 November 1963) is a Ukrainian football coach and a former player.
