= Volodymyr Kobzarev =

Soviet footballer and Ukrainian coach

Personal information
- Date of birth: 12 June 1957 (age 69)
- Place of birth: Voroshilovgrad, Ukrainian SSR
- Height: 1.78 m (5 ft 10 in)
- Position: Midfielder

Youth career
- 1975–1976: Zorya Voroshilovgrad

Senior career*
Years	Team	Apps	(Gls)
1977–1979	Zorya Voroshilovgrad	28	(0)
1980–1981	SKA Kyiv		
1981–1983	Dnipro Dnipropetrovsk	20	(0)
1983	Kolos Pavlohrad	26	(1)
1984–1989	Zorya Voroshilovgrad	142	(3)
1989	Shakhtar Pavlohrad	4	(0)

Managerial career
- 1994: Zorya-MALS Luhansk
- 1996–1998: Metalurh Novomoskovsk
- 1998–1999: Dnipro Dnipropetrovsk
- 2002–2003: Zorya Luhansk
- * Club domestic league appearances and goals

Volodymyr Kobzarev (Ukrainian: Володимир Олександрович Кобзарєв; born 12 June 1957) is a Soviet midfielder and coach from Ukraine.

Kobzarev resigned after a home loss of FC Dnipro to CSKA Kyiv on 17 April 1999. At that time Dnipro was placing 14 among 16 teams.
