= Nachalnik Komandy =

Non-playing position in football

Nachalnik Komandy (Russian: Начальник команды, literally – chief of team, director of team) is a non-playing position of association football in the Soviet Union and the Russian Federation and some post-Soviet states. The sports position of Nachalnik Komandy appeared in the Soviet football in the mid 1950s and in 1990 replaced a position of coach assistant or deputy in political affairs (political director) that existed since after the World War II. The main role of a political director was organization of political lecturing (politzaniatie), composition of written characteristics (reviews) on players, reporting to leadership about morale and political condition of a collective.

Created following the World War II (the Great Patriotic War in the Soviet phraseology), the post was part of the Communist Party and KGB structure, but after the ban against the Communist Party, associated with the failed 1991 coup-d'état, it partially changed its duties officially leaving out its propaganda of communism and the Soviet life style. Since 1990 the post of Nachalnik Komandy performs administrative and supporting duties in a club.

== See also ==
- Director of football
