= Oleksandr Malyshenko =

Ukrainian footballer (born 1960)

Personal information
- Full name: Oleksandr Viktorovych Malyshenko
- Date of birth: 30 June 1960 (age 66)
- Place of birth: Ukraine
- Position: Striker

Senior career*
Years	Team	Apps	(Gls)
1978–1980	FC Zorya Luhansk	77	(22)
1981	SC Tavriya Simferopol	32	(11)
1982–1985	FC Zorya Luhansk	112	(42)
1985–1986	SKA Lviv	79	(21)
1987	FC Metalist Kharkiv	23	(5)
1988–1991	FC Zorya Luhansk	128	(48)
1991	FC Khimik Sievierodonetsk	18	(13)
1991–1993	Nyíregyháza Spartacus FC	12	(0)
1993	Egri FC	11	(2)
1993	FC Hirnyk Rovenky		
1995–1996	FC Khimik Sievierodonetsk	26	(0)
1996–1997	FC Zorya Luhansk	20	(8)
1997	FC Desna Chernihiv	5	(2)
1997–1998	Slavyanets Konotop	11	(3)
- * Club domestic league appearances and goals

Oleksandr Viktorovych Malyshenko (born 30 June 1960) is a Ukrainian former footballer who played as striker.

== Early life ==
Malyshenko was born in 1960 in Ukraine. He grew up in Luhansk, Ukraine.

== Career ==
Malyshenko started his career with Ukrainian side FC Zorya Luhansk. He was regarded as a fan favorite while playing for the club. He was regarded as one of their most important players.
