= Yuriy Yeliseyev =

Soviet footballer (1949–2025)

Personal information
- Full name: Yuriy Kostiantynovych Yeliseyev
- Date of birth: 26 September 1949
- Place of birth: Sverdlovsk, Luhansk Oblast, Ukrainian SSR, USSR
- Date of death: 20 November 2025 (aged 76)
- Height: 1.78 m (5 ft 10 in)
- Position: Forward

Senior career*
Years	Team	Apps	(Gls)
1968	Lokomotiv Moscow	0	(0)
1969	Lokomotiv Kaluga	17	(0)
1970–1977	Zorya Voroshilovgrad	115	(36)
1978–1979	Krylia Sovetov Kuibyshev	45	(18)

International career
1972	USSR	7	(2)

Managerial career
- 2000: Zorya Luhansk
- 2002: Zorya Luhansk
- * Club domestic league appearances and goals

Olympic medal record

Representing Soviet Union

Men's Football
Bronze medal – third place	1972 Munich	Team competition

Yuriy Kostiantynovych Yeliseyev (Ukrainian: Юрій Костянтинович Єлісєєв; 26 September 1949 – 20 November 2025) was a Ukrainian football player and manager.

== International career ==
Yeliseyev made his debut for USSR on 29 June 1972 in a friendly against Uruguay. He played at the 1972 Summer Olympics and scored one goal.

== Death ==
Yeliseyev died on 20 November 2025, at the age of 76.

== Honours ==
- Soviet Top League winner: 1972.
- Olympic bronze: 1972.
