= Aleksey Vodyagin =

Russian footballer and coach

Personal information
- Full name: Aleksey Alekseyevich Vodyagin (Алексей Алексеевич Водягин)
- Date of birth: 10 January 1925
- Date of death: 21 April 1991 (aged 66)
- Place of death: Moscow, Russian SFSR, Soviet Union

Senior career*
Years	Team	Apps	(Gls)
1945	CDKA Moscow		
1946	Burevestnik Moscow		
1947–1953	CDKA Moscow		
1953–1954	Dynamo Moscow		
1955	Krylia Sovetov Samara		

Managerial career
- 1977–1989: Dinamo Moscow Football School
- * Club domestic league appearances and goals

Aleksey Alekseyevich Vodyagin (Russian: Алексей Алексеевич Водягин; 10 January 1925 – 21 April 1991) was a Russian footballer and coach.

In 1945, he began his playing career at the club CDKA Moscow, but was unable to break into the first team and next year he moved to second division team Burevestnik Moscow. Before the start of the season in 1947 however, he returned to CDKA and played there until 1953 when he moved to FC Dynamo Moscow. In 1955, he ended his playing career at the club FC Krylia Sovetov Samara. He was the winner of the USSR Cup in 1948, 1951 and 1953.

After retiring, he became a football coach from 1956 and in the years 1977-1989 served as a coach in Dinamo Moscow Football School. He died in Moscow on 21 April 1991.
