= Hryhoriy Nosko =

Soviet footballer (1910–1980)

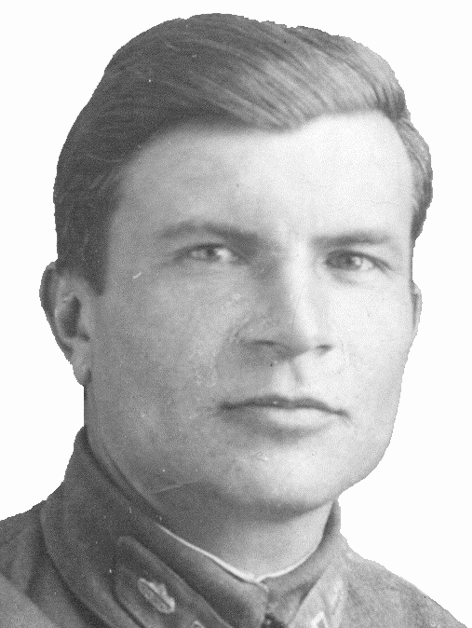

Personal information
- Full name: Hryhoriy Mykhailovych Nosko
- Date of birth: 16 December 1910
- Place of birth: Ivanivka, Slavo-Serbia, Yekaterinoslav Governorate, Russian Empire
- Date of death: 20 January 1980
- Place of death: Kiliya, Odessa Oblast, Soviet Ukraine
- Position: Midfielder

Senior career*
Years	Team	Apps	(Gls)
1936–1940	Dzerzhynets Voroshylovgrad		
- * Club domestic league appearances and goals

Hryhoriy Nosko (Ukrainian: Григорій Михайлович Носко, Russian: Григорий Михайлович Носко; 16 December 1910 — 20 January 1980) was a Soviet footballer who represented FC Dzerzhynets Voroshylovgrad as a midfielder and became a champion of Soviet Ukraine in 1938.

== Biography ==
Hryhoriy Nosko was born in 1910 in the town of Ivanivka, Slavo-Serbia, Yekaterinoslav Governorate, Russian Empire (now Luhansk Oblast, Ukraine). He lived in the city of Luhansk. Having graduated from a machine-building college, he worked at the Locomotive works. He was married and had two children. His son was Leonid Nosko (Ukrainian: Леонід Григорович Носко, Russian: Леонид Григорьевич Носко). His daughter was Lidiya Nosko (Ukrainian: Лідія Григорівна Носко, Russian: Лидия Григорьевна Носко). Hryhoriy Nosko participated in the German-Soviet War. During 1945–1949 he did military service in various military bases of the Soviet Union. Later he moved to the city of Kiliya. Hryhoriy Nosko died in 1980. He was buried in Kiliya.

== Football career ==
Hryhoriy Nosko was the captain of the machine-building college team. In 1930 his team won the town championship. After graduation, he continued to play in the team of the Locomotive works. In 1936 he became a first-string player of FC Dzerzhynets. During 1936–1940 he participated in more than 50 games of the championships of Soviet Ukraine and the Soviet Union. In 1937 and 1939 he was the captain of FC Dzerzhynets.

In 1937 FC Dzerzhynets reached the 1/16 final of the Soviet Cup. In 1938 it won the Soviet Ukraine Championship. In 1939 it reached the 1/16 final of the Soviet Cup and got the 16th place in the group «B» of the Soviet Top League.

== German-Soviet War ==
After the German-Soviet War began in 1941, Hryhoriy Nosko was called up for military service in the Red Army. In the rank of lieutenant, he was the commander of the 139th mobile tank-repairing unit of the 32nd motorized rifle regiment of the 18th tank corps. He fought at the Stalingrad Front, Southwestern Front, Steppe Front, 2nd Ukrainian Front and 3rd Ukrainian Front. For providing efficient operations to repair military vehicles, he was decorated with the Order of the Red Star in 1943 and the Order of the Patriotic War of the 2nd class in 1945.
