= Eugen Nosko =

German photographer and journalist

- Born: 15 October 1938 (age 87); Turčiansky Svätý Martin, Czechoslovakia
- Citizenship: East Germany (until 1985); West Germany (from 1985)
- Era: 1960s–1990s

Eugen Nosko (born 15 October 1938) is a German industrial photographer and journalist, known for producing thousands of photos of the industry of the German Democratic Republic, East Germany.

== Biography ==
Eugen Nosko was born in the territory of the Second Czechoslovak Republic just in the storming days of the Munich Agreement. In 1946 his family had to leave their country, due to the Beneš decrees, and came in Germany, in the Mecklenburg region.

From the mid-1960s to 1984 he specialised in photographing and writing articles about East German industry, like the Kombinat and VEB enterprises.

In 1985 he moved to West Germany, where he continued to work as journalist and photographer for another 15 years. Then he returned to Dresden.

All the 9,900 photographs shot by Nosko are publicly available online on the Deutsche Fotothek website with a CC-BY-SA 3.0 license and have all been even uploaded to the Wikimedia Commons website (see below).

== Gallery ==
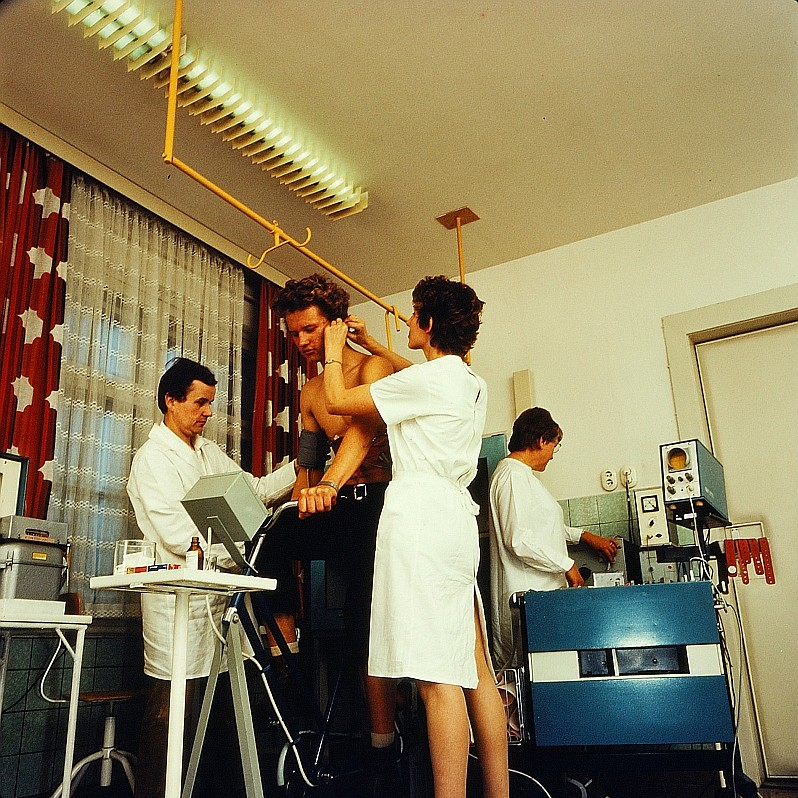

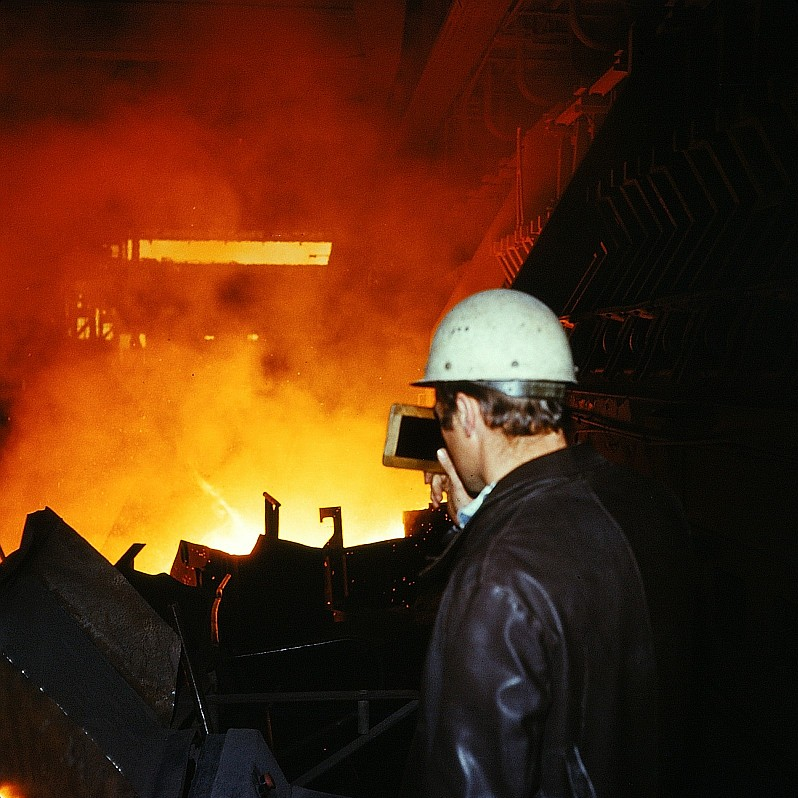

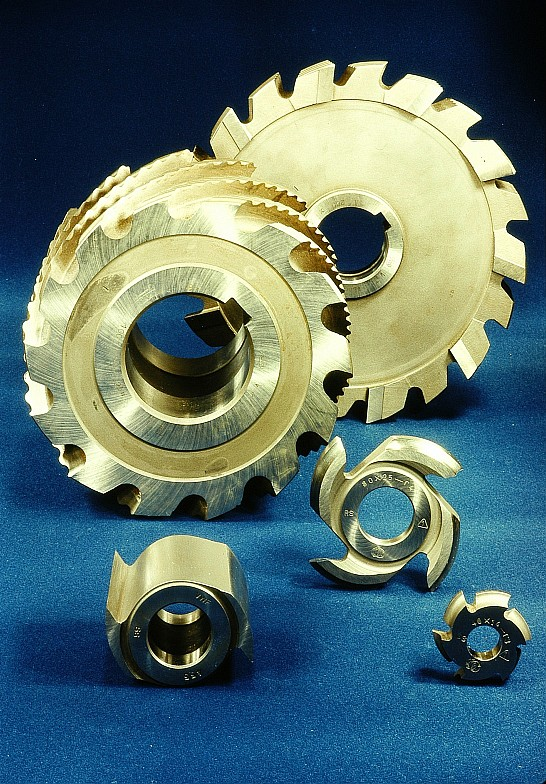

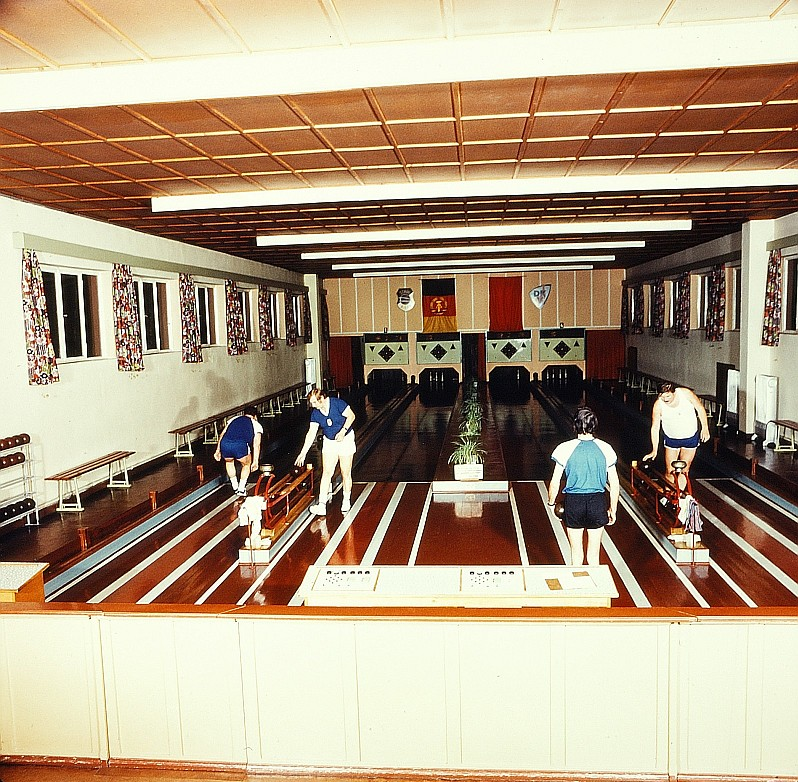

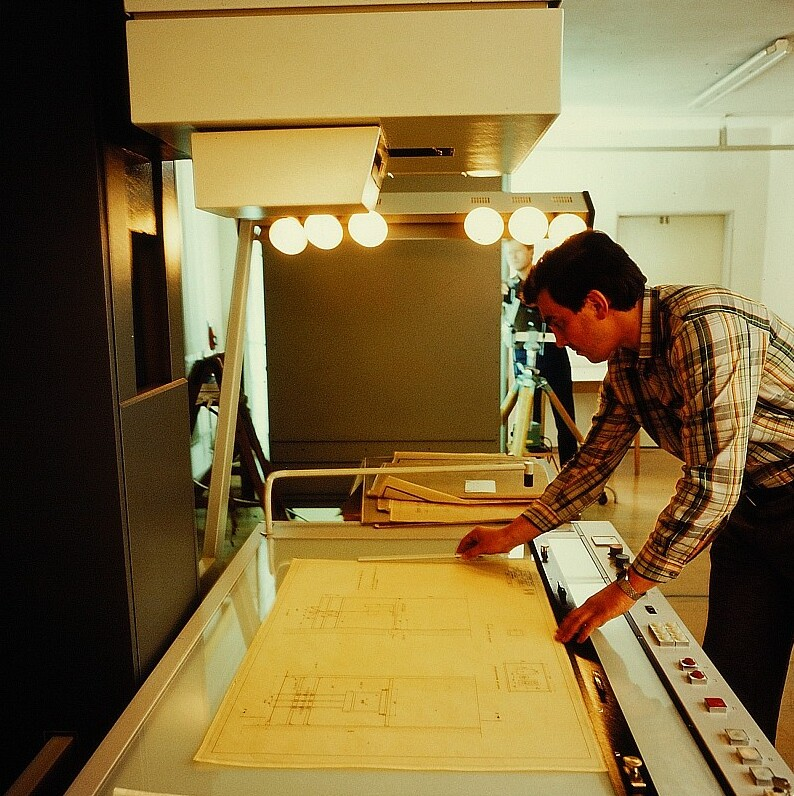

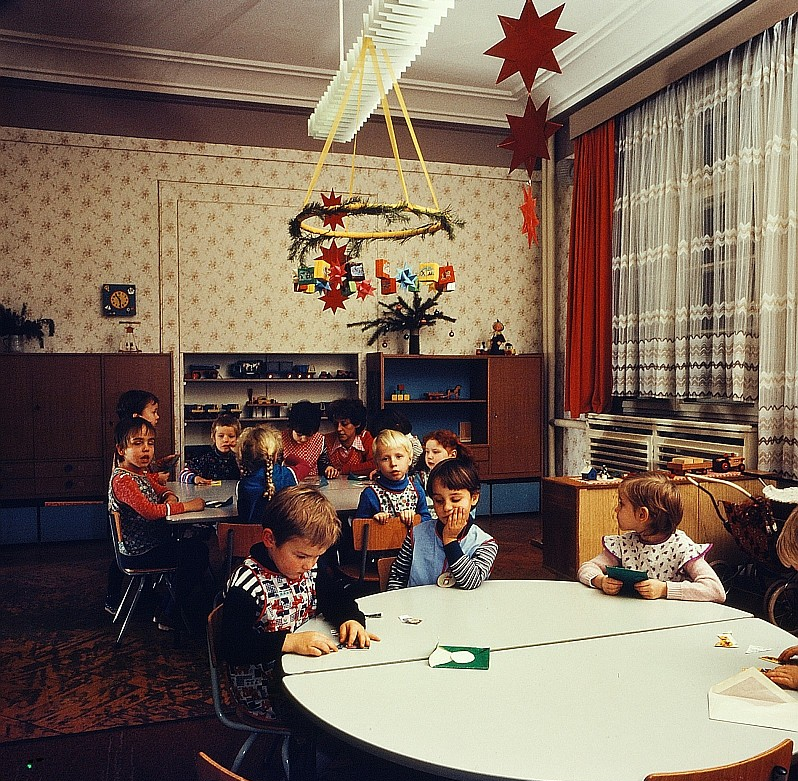

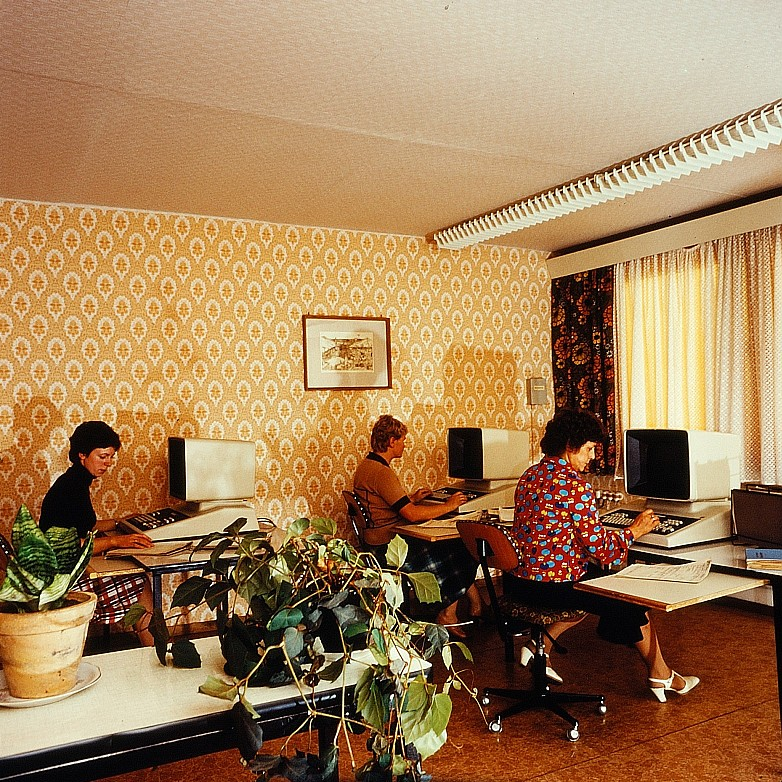

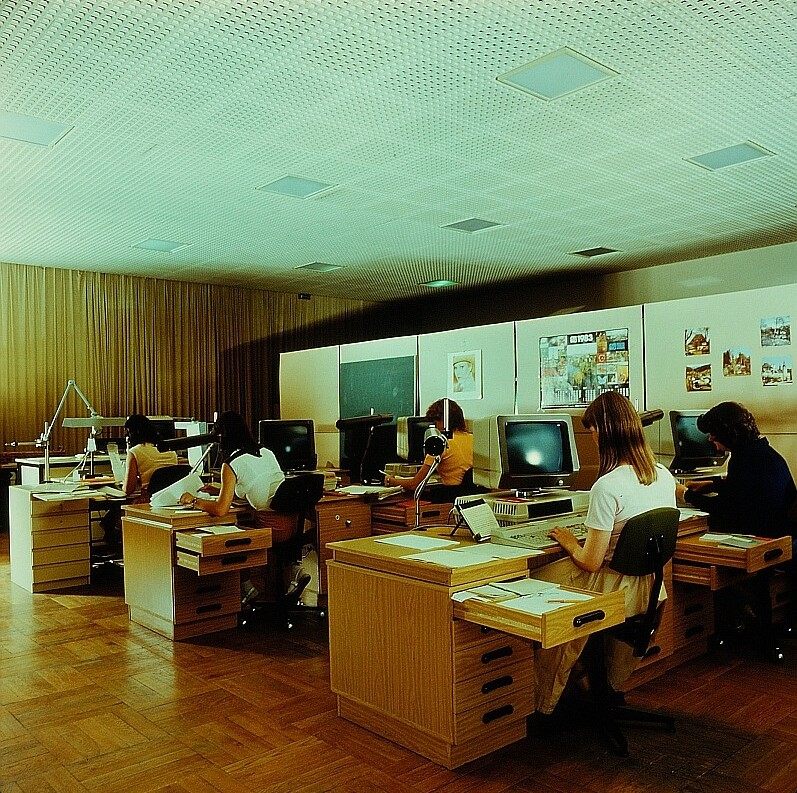

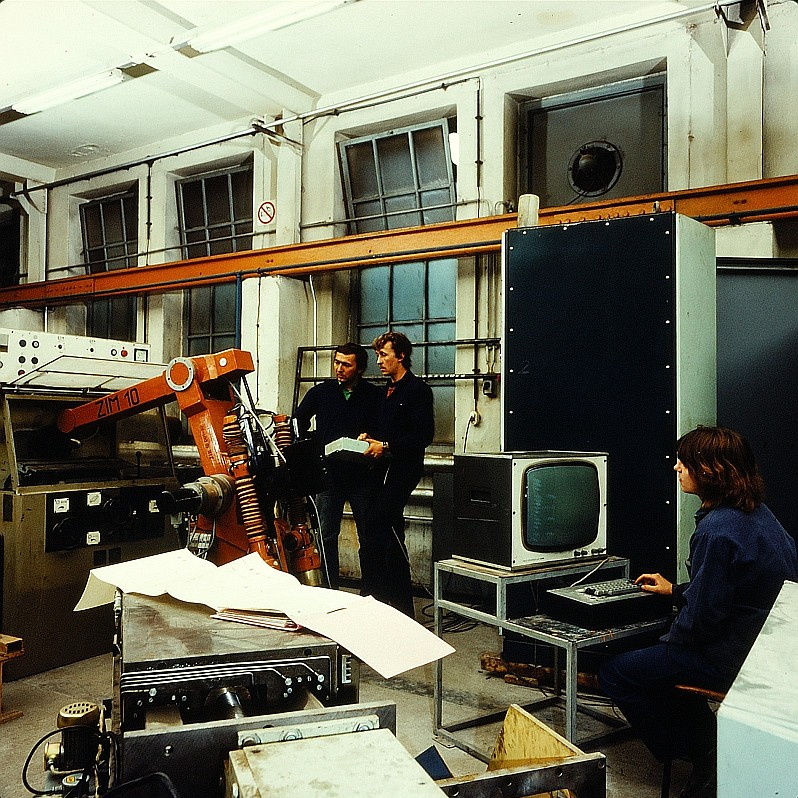

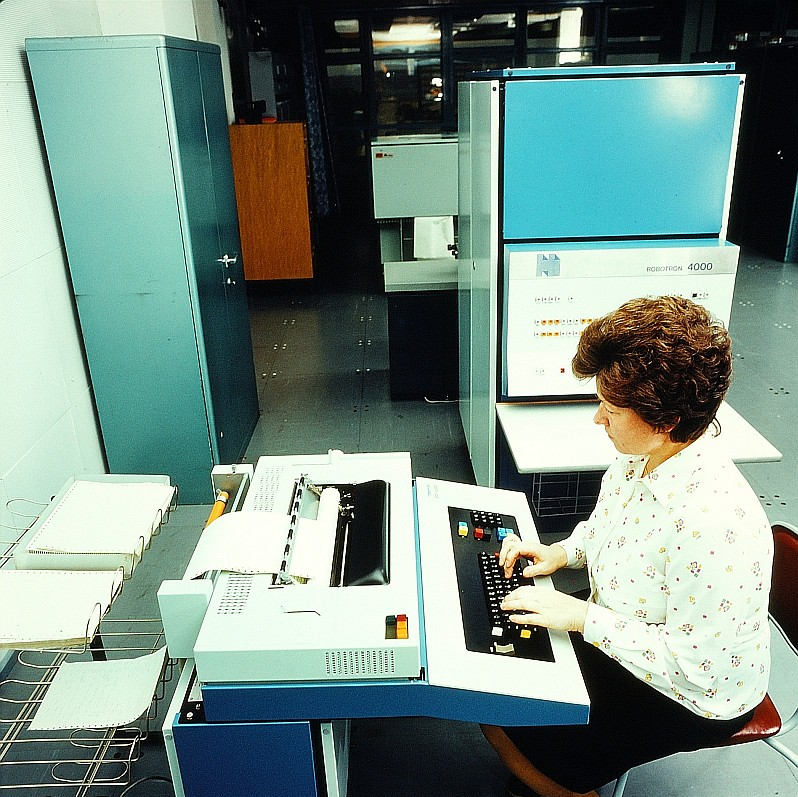

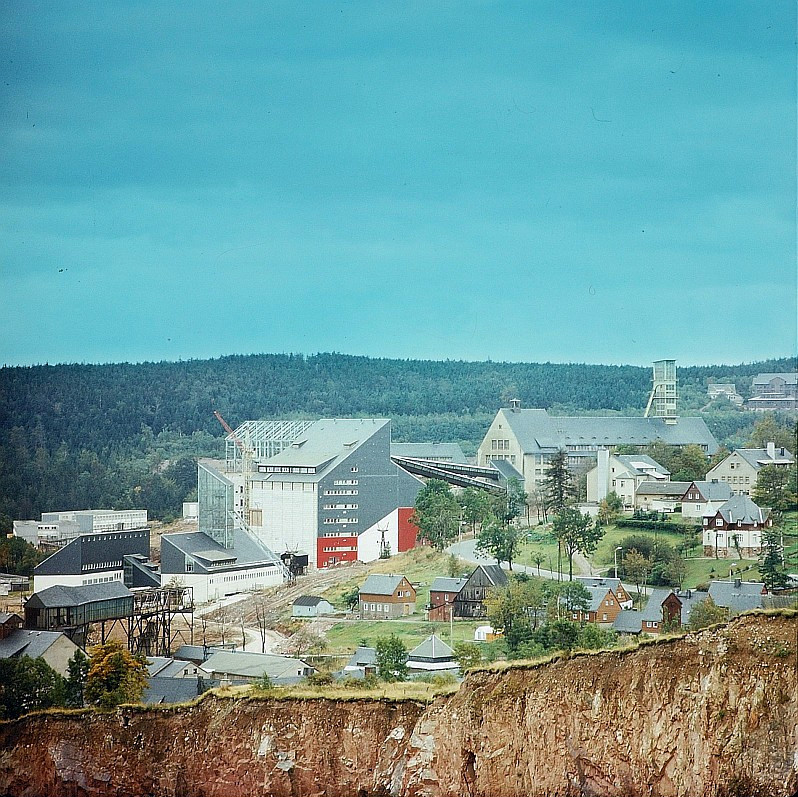

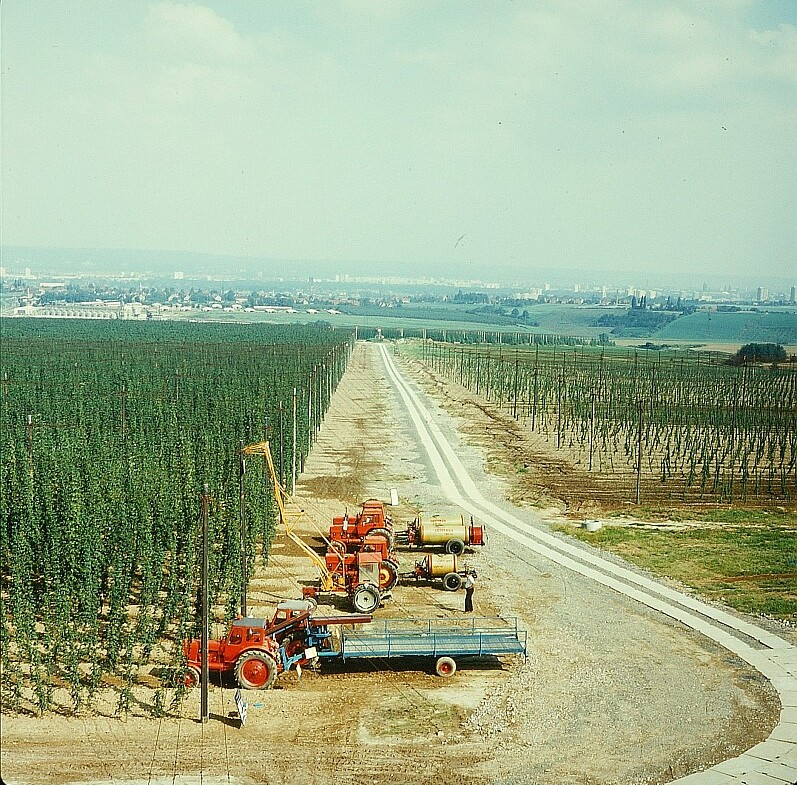
