= Aleksandr Nikitin (footballer) =

Soviet and Russian footballer (1961–2021)

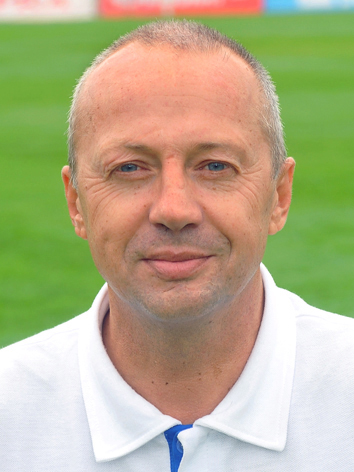

Personal information
- Full name: Aleksandr Borisovich Nikitin
- Date of birth: 4 February 1961
- Place of birth: Stalingrad, Russian SFSR, Soviet Union
- Date of death: 14 January 2021 (aged 59)
- Place of death: Volgograd, Russia
- Height: 1.83 m (6 ft 0 in)
- Positions: Striker; midfielder

Youth career
- Barrikady Volgograd
- DYuSSh-4 Volzhsky

Senior career*
Years	Team	Apps	(Gls)
1978–1980	FC Torpedo Volzhsky	74	(10)
1981–1982	FC Rotor Volgograd	68	(31)
1983–1984	FC SKA Rostov-on-Don	65	(21)
1985–1990	FC Rotor Volgograd	219	(82)
1991–1992	Malax IF (Finland)		(68)
1993	FC Rotor Volgograd	11	(0)

Managerial career
- 1997: FC Rotor Volgograd (assistant)
- 1998: FC Rotor-2 Volgograd
- 1999: FC Rotor-2 Volgograd (assistant)
- 2001–2002: FC Olimpia Volgograd (assistant)
- 2004: FC Rotor Volgograd (reserves assistant)
- 2004: FC Rotor Volgograd (assistant)
- 2005: FC Rotor Volgograd
- 2005–2006: FC Rotor Volgograd (assistant)
- 2007–2008: FC Rotor Volgograd (general director)
- 2009: FC Rotor Volgograd (director of sports)
- 2009: FC Rotor Volgograd
- * Club domestic league appearances and goals

Aleksandr Borisovich Nikitin (Russian: Алекса́ндр Бори́сович Ники́тин; 4 February 1961 – 14 January 2021) was a Russian professional football coach and player.

== Club career ==
He made his professional debut in the Soviet Second League in 1978 for FC Rotor Volgograd.

== Honours ==
- Russian Premier League runner-up: 1993.

== Personal life ==
His son Oleg Nikitin played football professionally.
