= 1960 Soviet Class B =

Soviet Class B
- Season: 1960

1960 Soviet Class B was the eleventh season of the Soviet Class B football competitions since their establishment in 1950. It was also the twentieth season of what eventually became known as the Soviet First League.

The competition was conducted in two stages. At the first stage teams were slit in multiple groups by republican principle to determine group winners. There were 74 teams in five RSFSR groups, 36 teams in two Ukrainian SSR groups, and 32 teams in two groups for the rest of union republics. At the second stage participants of the RSFSR final played for a single promotion, participants of the Ukrainian SSR final played to qualify for promotion/relegation playoff, while finalists of the Union republics played between each other.

== Russian Federation ==
=== I Zone ===
Pos	Team	Pld	W	D	L	GF	GA	GD	Pts
1	Trud Voronezh	30	20	6	4	58	18	+40	46
2	Spartak Leningrad	30	16	8	6	74	43	+31	40
3	Shakhtyor Stalinogorsk	30	16	7	7	51	32	+19	39
4	Raketa Gorkiy	30	13	12	5	46	30	+16	38
5	Znamya Truda Orekhovo-Zuyevo	30	15	7	8	60	37	+23	37
6	Trudoviye Rezervy Kursk	30	16	3	11	49	38	+11	35
7	Baltika Kaliningrad	30	12	6	12	60	37	+23	30
8	Trud Tula	30	11	6	13	39	43	−4	28
9	Lokomotiv Oryol	30	9	10	11	35	43	−8	28
10	Trudoviye Rezervy Lipetsk	30	10	7	13	39	39	0	27
11	Textilshchik Smolensk	30	9	8	13	29	39	−10	26
12	Cementnik Belgorod	30	6	11	13	33	52	−19	23
13	Spartak Tambov	30	8	6	16	34	53	−19	22
14	Sputnik Kaluga	30	8	5	17	36	68	−32	21
15	Dinamo Bryansk	30	7	6	17	32	64	−32	20
16	Ilmen Novgorod	30	6	8	16	31	70	−39	20

=== II Zone ===
Pos	Team	Pld	W	D	L	GF	GA	GD	Pts
1	Volga Kalinin	28	19	5	4	68	28	+40	43
2	Shinnik Yaroslavl (Note: Shinnik Yaroslavl was called Khimik.)	28	13	12	3	58	24	+34	38
3	Dinamo Kirov	28	18	2	8	49	30	+19	38
4	Trud Glukhovo	28	15	7	6	47	27	+20	37
5	Torpedo Gorkiy	28	12	8	8	39	29	+10	32
6	Traktor Vladimir (Note: Traktor Vladimir was called Torpedo.)	28	13	6	9	34	29	+5	32
7	Textilshchik Ivanovo	28	11	9	8	38	32	+6	31
8	Lokomotiv Saratov	28	11	8	9	41	36	+5	30
9	Dinamo Leningrad	28	9	6	13	46	43	+3	24
10	Avangard Kolomna	28	7	8	13	40	48	−8	22
11	Trud Ryazan	28	7	7	14	31	52	−21	21
12	Zarya Dzerzhinsk	28	4	11	13	29	48	−19	19
13	Metallurg Cherepovets	28	6	7	15	29	48	−19	19
14	Spartak Kostroma	28	6	5	17	30	60	−30	17
15	Zarya Penza	28	6	5	17	17	62	−45	17

=== III Zone ===
Pos	Team	Pld	W	D	L	GF	GA	GD	Pts
1	Terek Grozny	26	18	6	2	71	26	+45	42
2	Torpedo Taganrog	26	17	4	5	46	18	+28	38
3	Spartak Krasnodar (Note: Spartak Krasnodar was called Kuban.)	26	16	5	5	44	21	+23	37
4	RostSelMash Rostov-na-Donu	26	14	6	6	51	26	+25	34
5	Shakhtyor Shakhty	26	15	3	8	61	40	+21	33
6	Traktor Stalingrad	26	10	6	10	35	31	+4	26
7	Torpedo Armavir	26	9	6	11	28	37	−9	24
8	Temp Makhachkala	26	11	2	13	31	43	−12	24
9	Energiya Volzhskiy	26	10	3	13	34	35	−1	23
10	Spartak Stavropol	26	8	7	11	36	39	−3	23
11	Spartak Nalchik	26	9	5	12	50	56	−6	23
12	Cement Novorossiysk	26	5	5	16	23	46	−23	15
13	Volgar Astrakhan	26	4	4	18	23	73	−50	12
14	Spartak Orjonikidze	26	3	4	19	26	68	−42	10

=== IV Zone ===
Pos	Team	Pld	W	D	L	GF	GA	GD	Pts
1	Metallurg Nizhniy Tagil	28	19	3	6	74	36	+38	41
2	Zvezda Perm	28	17	6	5	53	27	+26	40
3	Lokomotiv Chelyabinsk	28	15	8	5	51	24	+27	38
4	Iskra Kazan	28	15	7	6	42	22	+20	37
5	Zenit Izhevsk	28	14	6	8	56	35	+21	34
6	Stroitel Ufa	28	16	2	10	53	42	+11	34
7	UralMash Sverdlovsk (Note: UralMash Sverdlovsk was called Mashinostroitel.)	28	14	5	9	53	37	+16	33
8	Spartak Ulyanovsk	28	10	5	13	43	54	−11	25
9	Khimik Berezniki	28	11	2	15	52	62	−10	24
10	Metallurg Magnitogorsk	28	7	9	12	43	60	−17	23
11	Neftyanik Syzran	28	8	7	13	33	56	−23	23
12	Lokomotiv Orenburg	28	7	6	15	25	45	−20	20
13	Progress Zelyonodolsk	28	6	7	15	31	52	−21	19
14	Metallurg Kamensk-Uralskiy	28	6	5	17	33	56	−23	17
15	Stroitel Kurgan	28	3	6	19	15	49	−34	12

=== V Zone ===
Pos	Team	Pld	W	D	L	GF	GA	GD	Pts
1	Irtysh Omsk	26	16	7	3	48	24	+24	39
2	SKA Khabarovsk	26	17	4	5	45	19	+26	38
3	SibElectroMotor Tomsk	26	17	3	6	45	22	+23	37
4	Temp Barnaul (Note: Temp Barnaul was called Urozhai.)	26	14	6	6	58	37	+21	34
5	SibSelMash Novosibirsk	26	11	8	7	47	35	+12	30
6	Khimik Kemerovo	26	11	6	9	35	35	0	28
7	Mashinostroitel Irkutsk (Note: Mashinostroitel Irkutsk was called Energiya.)	26	11	5	10	39	33	+6	27
8	Metallurg Stalinsk	26	8	8	10	30	30	0	24
9	Lokomotiv Krasnoyarsk	26	8	6	12	39	48	−9	22
10	Luch Vladivostok	26	8	4	14	24	31	−7	20
11	Avangard Komsomolsk-na-Amure (Note: Avangard Komsomolsk-na-Amure was called Lokomotiv.)	26	7	4	15	25	40	−15	18
12	Lokomotiv Ulan-Ude	26	4	9	13	13	37	−24	17
13	Amur Blagoveshchensk	26	4	7	15	25	55	−30	15
14	SKA Chita	26	4	7	15	17	44	−27	15

=== Final ===
[Oct 25 – Nov 5, Shakhty]

Pos	Team	Pld	W	D	L	GF	GA	GD	Pts	Promotion
1	Trud Voronezh	4	3	0	1	10	5	+5	6	Promoted
2	Irtysh Omsk	4	2	1	1	3	3	0	5	
3	Volga Kalinin	4	2	0	2	7	4	+3	4	
4	Metallurg Nizhniy Tagil	4	1	1	2	5	8	−3	3	
5	Terek Grozny	4	0	2	2	6	11	−5	2	

== Ukraine ==
=== Final ===
[Oct 28, 30, Kiev]

- Metallurg Zaporozhye 6-2 0-0 Sudostroitel Nikolayev

=== Promotion/relegation play-off ===
[Nov 3, 6]

- Shakhtyor Stalino 2-0 0-1 Metallurg Zaporozhye

== Union republics ==
=== I Zone ===
Pos	Rep	Team	Pld	W	D	L	GF	GA	GD	Pts
1	GEO	Lokomotiv Tbilisi	30	25	4	1	80	18	+62	54
2	BLR	Urozhai Minsk	30	22	5	3	60	18	+42	49
3	ARM	Shirak Leninakan	30	18	5	7	54	30	+24	41
4	MDA	Vierul Kishinev	30	13	7	10	37	28	+9	33
5	ARM	Lori Kirovakan	30	10	12	8	31	25	+6	32
6	ARM	Burevestnik Yerevan	30	13	6	11	42	34	+8	32
7	GEO	Dinamo Batumi	30	11	9	10	39	25	+14	31
8	LVA	Krasny Metallurg Liepaja	30	13	4	13	40	41	−1	30
9	BLR	Lokomotiv Gomel	30	11	8	11	36	38	−2	30
10	LVA	REZ Riga	30	9	7	14	49	65	−16	25
11	LTU	Banga Kaunas	30	8	9	13	23	37	−14	25
12	BLR	Krasnoye Znamya Vitebsk	30	7	7	16	26	44	−18	21
13	BLR	Khimik Mogilyov	30	5	10	15	36	54	−18	20
14	MDA	Nistrul Bendery (Note: Nistrul Bendery was called Lokomotiv.)	30	7	6	17	35	69	−34	20
15	BLR	Spartak Brest	30	7	4	19	27	59	−32	18
16	EST	Dinamo Tallinn	30	6	5	19	25	55	−30	17

=== Number of teams by republics ===
Number	Union republics	Team(s)
5	Belarusian SSR	FC Urozhai Minsk, FC Lokomotiv Gomel, FC Krasnoye Znamya Vitebsk, FC Khimik Mogilyov, FC Spartak Brest
3	Armenian SSR	FC Shirak Leninakan, FC Lori Kirovakan, FC Burevestnik Yerevan
2	Georgian SSR	FC Lokomotiv Tbilisi, FC Dinamo Batumi
2	Moldavian SSR	FC Nistrul Bendery, FC Vierul Kishinev
2	Latvian SSR	FC Krasny Metallurg Liepaja, FC REZ Riga
1	Lithuanian SSR	FK Banga Kaunas
1	Estonian SSR	FC Dinamo Tallinn

=== II Zone ===
Pos	Rep	Team	Pld	W	D	L	GF	GA	GD	Pts
1	GEO	Torpedo Kutaisi	30	21	7	2	70	21	+49	49
2	TJK	Pamir Leninabad	30	15	7	8	50	39	+11	37
3	AZE	Progress Baku	30	15	6	9	54	40	+14	36
4	GEO	Metallurg Rustavi	30	15	5	10	48	29	+19	35
5	KGZ	Spartak Frunze	30	13	7	10	40	39	+1	33
6	TJK	Energetik Stalinabad (Note: Energetik Stalinabad was called Hosilot.)	30	14	4	12	64	48	+16	32
7	AZE	Metallurg Sumgait	30	11	10	9	37	32	+5	32
8	GEO	Burevestnik Tbilisi	30	12	8	10	44	43	+1	32
9	UZB	Mehnat Tashkent (Note: Mehnat Tashkent was called Trudoviye Rezervy.)	30	11	9	10	35	32	+3	31
10	AZE	Textilshchik Kirovabad	30	12	7	11	41	44	−3	31
11	TKM	Kopet-Dag Ashkhabad (Note: Kopet-Dag Ashkhabad was called Kolhozchi.)	30	12	5	13	42	38	+4	29
12	KAZ	Shakhtyor Karaganda	30	10	5	15	50	54	−4	25
13	KAZ	Spartak Alma-Ata	30	7	11	12	32	41	−9	25
14	UZB	Spartak Fergana	30	5	10	15	37	61	−24	20
15	KAZ	Yenbek Chimkent	30	6	5	19	43	78	−35	17
16	UZB	Dinamo Samarkand	30	4	8	18	30	78	−48	16

Source: rsssf.com

=== Number of teams by republics ===
Number	Union republics	Team(s)
3	Georgian SSR	FC Torpedo Kutaisi, FC Metallurg Rustavi, FC Burevestnik Tbilisi
3	Azerbaijan SSR	FC Progress Baku, FC Metallurg Sumgait, FC Textilshchik Kirovabad
3	Uzbek SSR	FC Mekhnat Tashkent, FC Spartak Fergana, FC Dinamo Samarkand
3	Kazakh SSR	FC Shakhter Karaganda, FC Metallurg Chimkent, FC Metallist Jambul
2	Tajik SSR	FC Pamir Leninabad, FC Energetik Stalinabad
1	Kyrgyz SSR	FK Spartak Frunze
1	Turkmen SSR	FC Kopet-Dag Ashkhabad

=== Final ===
[Oct 30, Nov 5] 

- Torpedo Kutaisi 3-1 0-1 Lokomotiv Tbilisi

== See also ==
- Soviet First League
