= 1963 Soviet Class A Second Group =

Soviet Class A Second Group
- Season: 1963

The 1963 Soviet Class A Second Group was the inaugural season of the Soviet Class A Second Group football competitions that was reorganized based on the best teams of the 1962 Soviet Class B season. It was also the 23rd season of the Soviet second tier league competition.

The league was consolidated into a single group of 18 clubs.

== Qualified teams ==
Team	Class B zones and position in 1962	
Daugava Riga	Class A (relegation)	21
Žalgiris Vilnius	Class A (relegation)	22
Shinnik Yaroslavl	I Zone (Russia)	1
Trud Voronezh	II Zone (Russia)	1
Kuban Krasnodar	III Zone (Russia)	1
Traktor Volgograd	III Zone (Russia)	2
UralMash Sverdlovsk	IV Zone (Russia)	1
Lokomotiv Chelyabinsk	IV Zone (Russia)	2
SKA Novosibirsk	V Zone (Russia)	1
Chernomorets Odessa	I Zone (Ukraine)	1
Metallurg Zaporozhye	II Zone (Ukraine)	2
Trudoviye Rezervy Lugansk	III Zone (Ukraine)	1
Dnepr Dnepropetrovsk	III Zone (Ukraine)	6
Lokomotiv Gomel	I Zone (Union rep)	1
Shakhtyor Karaganda	II Zone (Union rep)	1
Alga Frunze	II Zone (Union rep)	2
Volga Gorkiy	new	
Karpaty Lvov	new	

Notes:

- FC Kuban Krasnodar was previously called as Spartak.
- FC Volga Gorkiy was added after merger of Torpedo Gorkiy and Raketa Gorkiy.
- FC Karpaty Lvov replaced SKA Lvov.

== Final standings ==
Pos	Republic	Team	Pld	W	D	L	GF	GA	GD	Pts
1	Russian SFSR	Shinnik Yaroslavl	34	16	13	5	42	19	+23	45
2	Russian SFSR	Volga Gorkiy	0	–	–	–	–	–	—	0
3	Russian SFSR	Trud Voronezh	34	15	12	7	43	26	+17	42
4	Ukrainian SSR	Metallurg Zaporozhie	34	12	17	5	36	17	+19	41
5	Ukrainian SSR	Trudovye rezervy Lugansk	34	15	11	8	41	26	+15	41
6	Ukrainian SSR	Chernomorets Odessa	34	13	13	8	39	31	+8	39
7	Ukrainian SSR	Karpaty Lvov	34	14	11	9	28	22	+6	39
8	Ukrainian SSR	Dnepr Dnepropetrovsk	34	13	10	11	36	34	+2	36
9	Latvian SSR	Daugava Riga	34	13	9	12	38	40	−2	35
10	Russian SFSR	Kuban Krasnodar	34	8	18	8	26	21	+5	34
11	Russian SFSR	Uralmash Sverdlovsk	34	12	8	14	31	40	−9	32
12	Kazakh SSR	Shakhter Karaganda	34	9	12	13	37	46	−9	30
13	Russian SFSR	Lokomotiv Cheliabinsk	34	7	15	12	23	36	−13	29
14	Lithuanian SSR	Zalgiris Vilnius	34	9	10	15	36	42	−6	28
15	Kyrgyz SSR	Alga Frunze	34	8	12	14	28	40	−12	28
16	Russian SFSR	Traktor Volgograd	34	9	9	16	25	40	−15	27
17	Russian SFSR	SKA Novosibirsk	34	2	16	16	15	37	−22	20
18	Byelorussian SSR	Lokomotiv Gomel	34	4	12	18	13	46	−33	14 (Note: 6 points deducted?)

== Top scorers ==
13 goals

- Anatoli Isayev (Shinnik Yaroslavl)
- Viktor Korolkov (Shakhter Karaganda)

12 goals

- Valentyn Hrishyn (Trudovye Rezervy Lugansk)
- Albert Liber (Trud Voronezh)

11 goals

- Vitaliy Kovalenko (Metallurg Zaporozhie)

== Number of teams by republics ==
Number	Union republics	Team(s)
8	Russian SFSR	FC Shinnik Yaroslavl, FC Trud Voronezh, FC Kuban Krasnodar, FC Traktor Volgograd, FC UralMash Sverdlovsk, FC Lokomotiv Chelyabinsk, SKA Novosibirsk, FC Volga Gorkiy
5	Ukrainian SSR	FC Chernomorets Odessa, FC Metallurg Zaporozhye, FC Trudoviye Rezervy Lugansk, FC Dnepr Dnepropetrovsk, FC Karpaty Lvov
1	Latvian SSR	FC Daugava Riga
1	Lithuanian SSR	FK Žalgiris Vilnius
1	Belarusian SSR	FC Lokomotiv Gomel
1	Kazakh SSR	FC Shakhter Karaganda
1	Kyrgyz SSR	FC Alga Frunze

== See also ==
- 1963 Soviet Top League
- 1963 Soviet Class B
