= 1972 Soviet Top League =

35th season of top-tier football league in Soviet Union

Soviet Top League
- Season: 1972

Statistics of Soviet Top League for the 1972 season.

== Overview ==
Sixteen (16) teams competed for the championships, and Zarya Voroshilovgrad won the championship.

== League standings ==
Pos	Team	Pld	W	D	L	GF	GA	GD	Pts	Qualification or relegation
1	(Ukrainian Soviet Socialist Republic) Zarya Voroshilovgrad (C)	30	15	10	5	52	30	+22	40	Qualification for European Cup first round
2	(Ukrainian Soviet Socialist Republic) Dynamo Kyiv	30	12	11	7	52	38	+14	35	Qualification for UEFA Cup first round
3	(Georgian Soviet Socialist Republic) Dinamo Tbilisi	30	12	11	7	41	34	+7	35	Qualification for UEFA Cup first round
4	(Armenian Soviet Socialist Republic) Ararat Yerevan	30	12	10	8	38	29	+9	34	
5	(Russian Soviet Federative Socialist Republic) CSKA Moscow	30	15	4	11	37	33	+4	34	
6	(Ukrainian Soviet Socialist Republic) Dnipro Dnipropetrovsk	30	12	10	8	37	37	0	34	
7	(Russian Soviet Federative Socialist Republic) Zenit Leningrad	30	11	11	8	44	30	+14	33	
8	(Byelorussian Soviet Socialist Republic) Dinamo Minsk	30	10	11	9	27	28	−1	31	
9	(Russian Soviet Federative Socialist Republic) Torpedo Moscow	30	11	9	10	31	33	−2	31	Qualification for Cup Winners' Cup first round
10	(Russian Soviet Federative Socialist Republic) Dynamo Moscow	30	12	6	12	39	35	+4	30	
11	(Russian Soviet Federative Socialist Republic) Spartak Moscow	30	8	10	12	29	30	−1	26	
12	(Russian Soviet Federative Socialist Republic) SKA Rostov-on-Don	30	8	10	12	31	35	−4	26	
13	(Kazakh Soviet Socialist Republic) Kairat Alma-Ata	30	6	14	10	23	27	−4	26	
14	(Ukrainian Soviet Socialist Republic) Karpaty Lviv	30	8	8	14	27	43	−16	24	
15	(Russian Soviet Federative Socialist Republic) Lokomotiv Moscow (R)	30	6	9	15	29	48	−19	21	Relegation to First League
16	(Azerbaijan Soviet Socialist Republic) Neftchi Baku (R)	30	6	8	16	28	55	−27	20	Relegation to First League

(C) Champions; (R) Relegated

== Results ==
Home \ Away	ARA	CSK	DNI	DYK	DMN	DYN	DTB	KAI	KAR	LOK	NEF	SKA	SPA	TOR	ZAR	ZEN
Ararat Yerevan		2–0	2–3	1–1	2–1	0–0	2–0	1–1	2–0	0–1	4–2	0–1	1–1	5–0	1–2	4–2
CSKA Moscow	0–1		2–0	3–2	0–3	0–0	3–2	3–1	3–1	3–2	1–0	1–0	1–0	1–0	2–1	2–1
Dnipro Dnipropetrovsk	0–0	2–1		2–2	1–0	1–1	2–1	4–0	0–0	1–0	5–0	1–0	1–0	2–1	1–2	3–3
Dynamo Kyiv	2–2	2–0	2–1		4–2	0–1	1–1	1–0	1–0	1–0	6–1	3–2	4–1	0–0	3–3	1–1
Dinamo Minsk	1–1	2–1	0–0	2–1		0–3	1–0	1–1	0–0	2–2	1–1	1–1	2–1	0–2	0–0	2–0
Dynamo Moscow	0–1	1–0	3–0	2–1	0–1		1–1	1–1	3–2	1–1	2–1	2–0	1–4	1–4	0–1	1–4
Dinamo Tbilisi	2–1	0–0	3–0	1–1	2–0	1–0		0–0	5–1	0–0	1–0	4–1	2–0	2–2	2–1	1–0
Kairat Alma-Ata	0–1	0–1	2–0	1–1	0–0	2–0	0–2		1–1	3–0	1–0	1–2	1–0	1–1	0–1	0–0
Karpaty Lviv	1–0	1–3	0–1	2–3	0–0	1–0	0–0	0–0		3–1	2–0	1–0	1–0	0–3	2–2	0–1
Lokomotiv Moscow	0–1	2–1	0–0	1–0	1–2	1–3	2–2	0–2	4–1		1–0	2–4	1–2	0–1	0–0	1–6
Neftçi Baku	1–1	1–1	1–2	1–4	1–0	2–5	3–1	0–0	2–1	2–2		2–1	1–1	1–0	3–0	0–1
SKA Rostov-on-Don	1–1	1–2	4–0	0–2	0–0	0–3	0–0	1–1	3–1	1–1	1–1		0–1	1–0	3–1	0–0
Spartak Moscow	0–1	1–0	1–1	1–1	2–0	1–0	5–0	0–0	1–3	2–0	0–0	0–0		0–0	1–1	1–2
Torpedo Moscow	0–0	2–1	1–1	1–0	1–0	1–4	0–3	2–1	0–0	0–1	3–0	0–2	2–1		2–4	0–0
Zarya Voroshilovgrad	4–0	1–0	3–0	3–0	0–1	2–0	2–2	2–1	4–1	1–1	3–0	1–1	3–1	1–1		2–1
Zenit Leningrad	2–0	1–1	2–2	2–2	0–2	1–0	5–0	1–1	0–1	3–1	3–1	2–0	0–0	0–1	0–0	

Legend: Blue = home team win; Yellow = draw; Red = away team win.

== Top scorers ==
14 goals

- Oleg Blokhin (Dynamo Kyiv)

13 goals

- Oganes Zanazanyan (Ararat)

12 goals

- Gennadi Khromchenkov (Zenit)
- Yuri Smirnov (Torpedo Moscow)

11 goals

- Viktor Kolotov (Dynamo Kyiv)

10 goals

- Anatoliy Banishevskiy (Neftchi)
- Vladimir Onischenko (Zorya)
- Aleksei Yeskov (SKA Rostov-on-Don)

9 goals

- Arkady Andreasyan (Ararat)
- Vladimir Muntyan (Dynamo Kyiv)
- Pavel Sadyrin (Zenit)
- Anatoli Vasilyev (Dinamo Minsk)
- Yuri Yeliseyev (Zorya)

== Attendances ==
No.	Club	Average
1	Zenit	39,900
2	Dynamo Kyiv	39,533
3	Zorya	33,933
4	Dnipro	30,667
5	Ararat	30,547
6	Dinamo Minsk	30,533
7	Karpaty	29,600
8	Dinamo Tbilisi	27,667
9	Dynamo Moscow	21,787
10	Spartak Moscow	21,673
11	PFC CSKA	19,333
12	Torpedo Moscow	17,673
13	Rostov-on-Don	16,000
14	Kairat	15,733
15	Neftçhi	15,400
16	Lokomotiv Moscow	12,477
