= 1986 USSR Federation Cup =

1986 Cup of Football Federation of USSR
USSR Federation Cup

Tournament details
- Host country: Soviet Union
- Dates: 21 September to 4 November
- Teams: 16
- Venue(s): 18 (in 15 host cities)

Final positions
- Champions: (Ukrainian Soviet Socialist Republic) Dnepr Dnepropetrovsk (1st title)
- Runners-up: (Russian Soviet Federative Socialist Republic) Zenit Leningrad

Tournament statistics
- Matches played: 27
- Goals scored: 64 (2.37 per match)
- Attendance: 170,700 (6,322 per match)
- Top scorer(s): (5) - Oleh Taran (Dnepr)

The 1st USSR Federation Cup was brief and took place between 21 September through 4 November. Its final was played at the Republican Stadium in Kishinev.

== Group stage ==
=== Group A ===
Team	Pld	W	D	L	GF	GA	GD	Pts
(Armenian Soviet Socialist Republic) Ararat Yerevan	3	2	0	1	5	4	+1	4
(Azerbaijan Soviet Socialist Republic) Neftchi Baku	3	1	1	1	4	5	−1	3
(Georgian Soviet Socialist Republic) Dinamo Tbilisi	3	1	1	1	2	1	+1	3
(Georgian Soviet Socialist Republic) Torpedo Kutaisi	3	0	2	1	3	4	−1	2

21 September 1986

Neftchi Baku (Azerbaijan Soviet Socialist Republic)	1 – 3	(Armenian Soviet Socialist Republic) Ararat Yerevan
Akhmedov	Report	V.Khachatryan; Galustyan; Pogosyan

Lenin Republican Stadium, Baku
Attendance: 10,800

21 September 1986

Torpedo Kutaisi (Georgian Soviet Socialist Republic)	0 – 0	(Georgian Soviet Socialist Republic) Dinamo Tbilisi
	Report

Central Stadium, Kutaisi
Attendance: 6,500

28 September 1986

Ararat Yerevan (Armenian Soviet Socialist Republic)	2 – 1	(Georgian Soviet Socialist Republic) Torpedo Kutaisi
A.Khachatryan; Kocharyan	Report	Managadze

Hrazdan Stadium, Yerevan
Attendance: 5,200

28 September 1986

Dinamo Tbilisi (Georgian Soviet Socialist Republic)	0 – 1	(Azerbaijan Soviet Socialist Republic) Neftchi Baku
	Report	Suleimanov

Dinamo Stadium, Tbilisi
Attendance: 4,500

12 October 1986

Dinamo Tbilisi (Georgian Soviet Socialist Republic)	2 – 0	(Armenian Soviet Socialist Republic) Ararat Yerevan
Guruli; Bigvava	Report

Dinamo Stadium, Tbilisi
Attendance: 3,100

12 October 1986

Neftchi Baku (Azerbaijan Soviet Socialist Republic)	2 – 2	(Georgian Soviet Socialist Republic) Torpedo Kutaisi
Vaxab-zade; Sadyxov	Report	Pruidze; Shengelia

Lenin Republican Stadium, Baku
Attendance: 1,700

=== Group B ===
Team	Pld	W	D	L	GF	GA	GD	Pts
(Russian Soviet Federative Socialist Republic) Spartak Moscow	3	2	1	0	4	1	+3	5
(Russian Soviet Federative Socialist Republic) Torpedo Moscow	3	2	0	1	3	2	+1	4
(Kazakh Soviet Socialist Republic) Kairat Alma-Ata	3	1	0	2	2	2	0	2
(Russian Soviet Federative Socialist Republic) Dinamo Moscow	3	0	1	2	1	5	−4	1

22 September 1986

Dinamo Moscow (Russian Soviet Federative Socialist Republic)	1 – 1	(Russian Soviet Federative Socialist Republic) Spartak Moscow
Borodyuk (pen.)	Report	Eremenko

Dynamo Stadium, Moscow
Attendance: 3,200

23 September 1986

Torpedo Moscow (Russian Soviet Federative Socialist Republic)	1 – 0	(Kazakh Soviet Socialist Republic) Kairat Alma-Ata
Chugunov	Report

Torpedo Stadium, Moscow
Attendance: 500

26 September 1986

Spartak Moscow (Russian Soviet Federative Socialist Republic)	1 – 0	(Kazakh Soviet Socialist Republic) Kairat Alma-Ata
Eremenko	Report

Lenin Central Stadium, Moscow
Attendance: 500

27 September 1986

Dinamo Moscow (Russian Soviet Federative Socialist Republic)	0 – 2	(Russian Soviet Federative Socialist Republic) Torpedo Moscow
	Report	Kobzev (2)

Dynamo Stadium, Moscow
Attendance: 1,500

12 October 1986

Spartak Moscow (Russian Soviet Federative Socialist Republic)	2 – 0	(Russian Soviet Federative Socialist Republic) Torpedo Moscow
Mitin; Novikov	Report

Lenin Central Stadium, Moscow
Attendance: 3,000

12 October 1986

Kairat Alma-Ata (Kazakh Soviet Socialist Republic)	2 – 0	(Russian Soviet Federative Socialist Republic) Dinamo Moscow
Karachun; Pekhlevanidi	Report

Central Stadium, Alma-Ata
Attendance: 7,200

=== Group C ===
Team	Pld	W	D	L	GF	GA	GD	Pts
(Ukrainian Soviet Socialist Republic) Dnepr Dnipropetrovsk	3	2	1	0	7	2	+5	5
(Ukrainian Soviet Socialist Republic) Chernomorets Odessa	3	1	1	1	4	5	−1	3
(Ukrainian Soviet Socialist Republic) Shakhter Donetsk	3	1	1	1	3	4	−1	3
(Ukrainian Soviet Socialist Republic) Dynamo Kyiv	3	0	1	2	4	7	−3	1

21 September 1986

Shakhter Donetsk (Ukrainian Soviet Socialist Republic)	1 – 1	(Ukrainian Soviet Socialist Republic) Chernomorets Odessa
Radenko	Report	Ploskina (pen.)

Shakhtar Stadium, Donetsk
Attendance: 12,000

22 September 1986

Dynamo Kyiv (Ukrainian Soviet Socialist Republic)	2 – 2	(Ukrainian Soviet Socialist Republic) Dnepr Dnepropetrovsk
Karatayev; Yevtushenko	Report	Taran (both goals)

Republican Stadium, Kyiv
Attendance: 15,000

26 September 1986

Dnepr Dnepropetrovsk (Ukrainian Soviet Socialist Republic)	3 – 0	(Ukrainian Soviet Socialist Republic) Chernomorets Odessa
Kudrytsky (2); Taran	Report

Meteor Stadium, Dnipropetrovsk
Attendance: 5,100

26 September 1986

Dynamo Kyiv (Ukrainian Soviet Socialist Republic)	1 – 2	(Ukrainian Soviet Socialist Republic) Shakhter Donetsk
Karatayev	Report	Hyerasimets; Hrachov

Republican Stadium, Kyiv
Attendance: 4,500

12 October 1986

Dnepr Dnepropetrovsk (Ukrainian Soviet Socialist Republic)	2 – 0	(Ukrainian Soviet Socialist Republic) Shakhter Donetsk
Taran; Shokh	Report

Meteor Stadium, Dnipropetrovsk
Attendance: 10,000

12 October 1986

Chernomorets Odessa (Ukrainian Soviet Socialist Republic)	3 – 1	(Ukrainian Soviet Socialist Republic) Dynamo Kyiv
Sekinayev (2); Yurchenko; Ploskina (penalty missed)	Report	Protsyuk

Chornomorets Stadium, Odessa
Attendance: 5,300

=== Group D ===
Team	Pld	W	D	L	GF	GA	GD	Pts
(Russian Soviet Federative Socialist Republic) Zenit Leningrad	3	2	0	1	3	1	+2	4
(Ukrainian Soviet Socialist Republic) Metallist Kharkov	3	2	0	1	8	2	+6	4
(Lithuanian Soviet Socialist Republic) Zhalgiris Vilnius	3	1	1	1	3	8	−5	3
(Byelorussian Soviet Socialist Republic) Dinamo Minsk	3	0	1	2	1	4	−3	1

21 September 1986

Metallist Kharkov (Ukrainian Soviet Socialist Republic)	7 – 1	(Lithuanian Soviet Socialist Republic) Zhalgiris Vilnius
Dumansky 1', 24' (pen.); Tarasov 33', 52', 68', 74'; Enei 54'	Report	Bubliauskas 39'

Metallist Stadium, Kharkov
Attendance: 7,000
Referee: Yuriy Serhiyenko (Kharkov)

22 September 1986

Dinamo Minsk (Byelorussian Soviet Socialist Republic)	0 – 2	(Russian Soviet Federative Socialist Republic) Zenit Leningrad
	Report	Chukhlov 41'; Gerasimov 77'

Dinamo Stadium, Minsk
Attendance: 1,500
Referee: Heorh Homan (Zhodino)

26 September 1986

Dinamo Minsk (Byelorussian Soviet Socialist Republic)	1 – 1	(Lithuanian Soviet Socialist Republic) Zhalgiris Vilnius
Kandratsyew	Report	Tautkus

Dinamo Stadium, Minsk
Attendance: 5,500

26 September 1986

Zenit Leningrad (Russian Soviet Federative Socialist Republic)	1 – 0	(Ukrainian Soviet Socialist Republic) Metallist Kharkov
Dmitriyev	Report

Kirov Stadium, Leningrad
Attendance: 6,500

12 October 1986

Zhalgiris Vilnius (Lithuanian Soviet Socialist Republic)	1 – 0	(Russian Soviet Federative Socialist Republic) Zenit Leningrad
Kviliunas	Report

Zalgiris Stadium, Vilnius
Attendance: 1,100

12 October 1986

Metallist Kharkov (Ukrainian Soviet Socialist Republic)	1 – 0	(Byelorussian Soviet Socialist Republic) Dinamo Minsk
Kasumov	Report

Metallist Stadium, Kharkov
Attendance: 6,000

== Knock-out stage ==
Semi-finals
26 October 1986
(Russian Soviet Federative Socialist Republic) Zenit Leningrad	1
(Armenian Soviet Socialist Republic) Ararat Yerevan	0
27 October 1986
(Ukrainian Soviet Socialist Republic) Dnepr	4
(Russian Soviet Federative Socialist Republic) Spartak Moscow	0

Final
4 November 1986
(Ukrainian Soviet Socialist Republic) Dnepr	2
(Russian Soviet Federative Socialist Republic) Zenit Leningrad	0

=== Semifinals ===
26 October 1986

Zenit Leningrad (Russian Soviet Federative Socialist Republic)	1 – 0	(Armenian Soviet Socialist Republic) Ararat Yerevan
Chukhlov 12'	Report

Lenin Stadium, Zenit Leningrad
Attendance: 16,000
Referee: Sergei Khusainov (Moscow)

27 October 1986

Dnepr Dnepropetrovsk (Ukrainian Soviet Socialist Republic)	4 – 0	(Russian Soviet Federative Socialist Republic) Spartak Moscow
Shokh 17'; Protasov 38', 67'; Taran 52'; Protasov (penalty missed) 67'	Report

Meteor Stadium, Dnipropetrovsk
Attendance: 7,500
Referee: Velodi Miminoshvili (Tbilisi)

=== Final ===
4 November 1986

Dnepr Dnepropetrovsk (Ukrainian Soviet Socialist Republic)	2 – 0	(Russian Soviet Federative Socialist Republic) Zenit Leningrad
Lytovchenko; Lyuty	Report

Republican Stadium, Chişinău
Attendance: 20,000
Referee: Aleksandr Khokhriakov (Yoshkar-Ola)

(Ukrainian Soviet Socialist Republic); Dnepr:
GK	Valery Horodov
??	Serhiy Bashkirov
??	Ivan Vishnevsky
??	Serhiy Puchkov
??	Oleh Fedyukov		(substituted off) 46'
??	Volodymyr Bahmut		(substituted off) 46'
??	Anton Shokh
??	Hennadiy Lytovchenko (c)
??	Vladimir Lyuty		(substituted off) 88'
??	Oleksiy Cherednyk
??	Oleh Taran	Booked
Substitutions:
??	Yuri Gavrilov		(substituted in) 46' (F)
??	Mykola Kudrytsky		(substituted in) 46' (B)
??	Vasyl Storchak		(substituted in) 88'
Manager: Volodymyr Yemets
Assistant referees:

(Russian Soviet Federative Socialist Republic); Zenit:
GK	Sergei Prikhodko	(substituted off) 46'
??	Nikolai Vorobiov
??	Aleksei Stepanov	(substituted off) 76'
??	Gennadiy Timofeyev
??	Arkadiy Afanasiev
??	Nikolai Larionov (c)
??	Sergei Kuznetsov
??	Aleksandr Kanishchev
??	Oleg Salenko	(substituted off) 76'
??	Sergei Dmitriyev
??	Dmitriy Barannik
Substitutes:
GK	Sergei Kopiy	(substituted in) 46'
??	Vladimir Klementiev	(substituted in) 76' (St)
??	Boris Chukhlov	(substituted in) 76' (Sa)
Manager: Pavel Sadyrin

== Top scorers ==
5 goals

- Oleh Taran (Dnepr Dnepropetrovsk)

4 goals

- Yuriy Tarasov (Metallist Kharkov)

2 goals

- Yuriy Sekinayev (Chernomorets Odessa)
- Vladimir Kobzev (Torpedo Moscow)
- Aleksei Yeryomenko
- Oleh Protasov (Dnepr Dnepropetrovsk)
- Boris Chukhlov (Zenit Leningrad)
- Vadym Karatayev (FC Dynamo Kyiv)
- Mykola Kudrytskyi (Dnepr Dnepropetrovsk)
- Anton Shokh (Dnepr Dnepropetrovsk)
- Yaroslav Dumanskyi (Metallist Kharkov)
