= 1989 Soviet Cup final =

1989 Soviet Cup Final
- Event: 1988-89 Soviet Cup
Torpedo Moscow	Dnipro Dnipropetrovsk
0	1
- Date: 25 June 1989
- Venue: Lenin's Central Stadium, Moscow
- Referee: Vadim Zhuk (Minsk)
- Attendance: 30,000
- Weather: 27°C

The 1989 Soviet Cup Final was a football match that took place at the Lenin's Central Stadium, Moscow on June 25, 1989. The match was the 48th Soviet Cup Final and it was contested by FC Dnipro Dnipropetrovsk and FC Torpedo Moscow. The Soviet Cup winner Dnipro qualified for the Champions Cup for winning the champion's title, while the finalist Torpedo was allowed to compete at the Cup Winners' Cup first round for the Soviet Union. The last year defending champions Metalist Kharkiv were eliminated in the second round of the competition by FC Torpedo Moscow (1:1, 1:2). For Dnipro this was their first final. For Torpedo it was their 14th Cup Final and the eighth loss at this stage.

== Road to Moscow ==
All sixteen Soviet Top League clubs did not have to go through qualification to get into the competition, so Dnepr and Torpedo both qualified for the competition automatically.

Torpedo Moscow

Round 1 (1st leg)	Torpedo	2–0	KUZBASS
Round 1 (2nd leg)	KUZBASS	1–1	Torpedo
	(Torpedo won 3–1 on aggregate)		
Round 2 (1st leg)	Metalist	1–1	Torpedo
Round 2 (2nd leg)	Torpedo	2–1	Metalist
	(Torpedo won 3–2 on aggregate)		
Quarter-final	Torpedo	4–3	Shakhtar
Semi-final	Torpedo	2–0	Dynamo K.

Dnipro Dnipropetrovsk

Round 1 (1st leg)	Dnipro	5–0	Shinnik
Round 1 (2nd leg)	Shinnik	2–0	Dnipro
	(Dnipro won 7–0 on aggregate)		
Round 2 (1st leg)	Zenit	0–1	Dnipro
Round 2 (2nd leg)	Dnipro	1–1	Zenit
	(Dnipro won 2–1 on aggregate)		
Quarter-final	Dnipro	1–0	Dinamo Minsk
Semi-final	Dynamo Tb.	1–2	Dnipro

== Previous Encounters ==
Previously they only met seven times with Torpedo winning four and Dnipro 3, the goals were 7 to 5 respectively. The very first time they met each other on March 12, 1972, at the Round of 16 when Torpedo playing home was victorious 2:0. The last encounter was during the last season when in the semifinals Torpedo once again defeated Dnipro in overtime playing at home.

== Match details ==
1989-06-25
18:00 LST

Torpedo Moscow	0 – 1	Dnipro Dnipropetrovsk
	Report	Shokh 34'

Lenin's Central Stadium, Moscow
Attendance: 30,000
Referee: Vadim Zhuk (Minsk)

FC Torpedo Moscow	FC Dnipro Dnipropetrovsk

FC Torpedo Moscow:
GK	(Tajik Soviet Socialist Republic) Valeri Sarychev
DF	(Russian Soviet Federative Socialist Republic) Sergei Makeyev
DF	(Russian Soviet Federative Socialist Republic) Valentin Kovach
MF	(Russian Soviet Federative Socialist Republic) Sergei Zhukov	(substituted off) 75'
DF	(Russian Soviet Federative Socialist Republic) Vadim Rogovskoy
DF	(Russian Soviet Federative Socialist Republic) Gennadi Grishin	(substituted off) 72'
MF	(Russian Soviet Federative Socialist Republic) Yuriy Savichev (c)
MF	(Russian Soviet Federative Socialist Republic) Andrei Rudakov
MF	(Russian Soviet Federative Socialist Republic) Nikolai Savichev
FW	(Tajik Soviet Socialist Republic) Oleg Shirinbekov	(substituted off) 62'
FW	(Russian Soviet Federative Socialist Republic) Sergey Agashkov
Substitutes:
FW	(Russian Soviet Federative Socialist Republic) Renat Ataulin	(substituted in) 75'
DF	(Russian Soviet Federative Socialist Republic) Aleksandr Gitselov	(substituted in) 72'
MF	(Russian Soviet Federative Socialist Republic) Vladimir Grechnyov	(substituted in) 67'
GK
DF
DF
MF
Manager:
(Russian Soviet Federative Socialist Republic) Valentin Ivanov

FC Dnipro Dnipropetrovsk:
GK	(Ukrainian Soviet Socialist Republic) Serhiy Krakovskyi
DF	(Ukrainian Soviet Socialist Republic) Andriy Yudin	(substituted off) 88'
DF	(Ukrainian Soviet Socialist Republic) Ivan Vyshnevskyi
MF	(Ukrainian Soviet Socialist Republic) Andriy Sydelnykov	(yellow card) 53'	(substituted off) 83'
DF	(Ukrainian Soviet Socialist Republic) Vadym Tyshchenko
DF	(Ukrainian Soviet Socialist Republic) Mykola Kudrytsky	(substituted off) 67'
MF	(Ukrainian Soviet Socialist Republic) Volodymyr Bahmut
MF	(Tajik Soviet Socialist Republic) Oleksiy Cherednyk
MF	(Kazakh Soviet Socialist Republic) Anton Shokh (c)
FW	(Kazakh Soviet Socialist Republic) Eduard Son
FW	(Ukrainian Soviet Socialist Republic) Yevhen Shakhov
Substitutes:
FW	(Ukrainian Soviet Socialist Republic) Oleksandr Chervonyi	(substituted in) 88'
DF	(Ukrainian Soviet Socialist Republic) Volodymyr Lyutyi	(substituted in) 83'
MF	(Kazakh Soviet Socialist Republic) Evgeny Yarovenko	(substituted in) 67'
GK
DF
DF
MF
Manager:
(Ukrainian Soviet Socialist Republic) Yevhen Kucherevsky

MATCH OFFICIALS

- Assistant referees:
  - V.Chekhoev (Ordjonikidze)
  - V.Medvedtsky (Volzhskiy)
- Fourth official: ( )

MATCH RULES

- 90 minutes.
- 30 minutes of extra-time if necessary.
- Penalty shoot-out if scores still level.
- Seven named substitutes
- Maximum of 3 substitutions.

Soviet Cup 1989 Winners
Dnipro Dnipropetrovsk
First title

== See also ==
- Soviet Top League 1988
