= 1988 Soviet Top League =

51st season of top-tier football league in Soviet Union

Soviet Top League
- Season: 1988
- Dates: March 7 — November 19, 1988
- Champions: Dnipro Dnepropetrovsk (2nd title)
- Relegated: Neftchi Baku; Kairat Alma-Ata
- European Cup: Dnipr Dnipropetrovsk
- Cup Winners' Cup: Torpedo Moscow
- UEFA Cup: Spartak Moscow; Dynamo Kiev; Žalgiris Vilnius; Zenit Leningrad
- Matches: 240
- Goals: 526 (2.19 per match)
- Top goalscorer: (16) Aleksandr Borodyuk (Dynamo Moscow), Yevhen Shakhov (Dnipro Dnipropetrovsk)

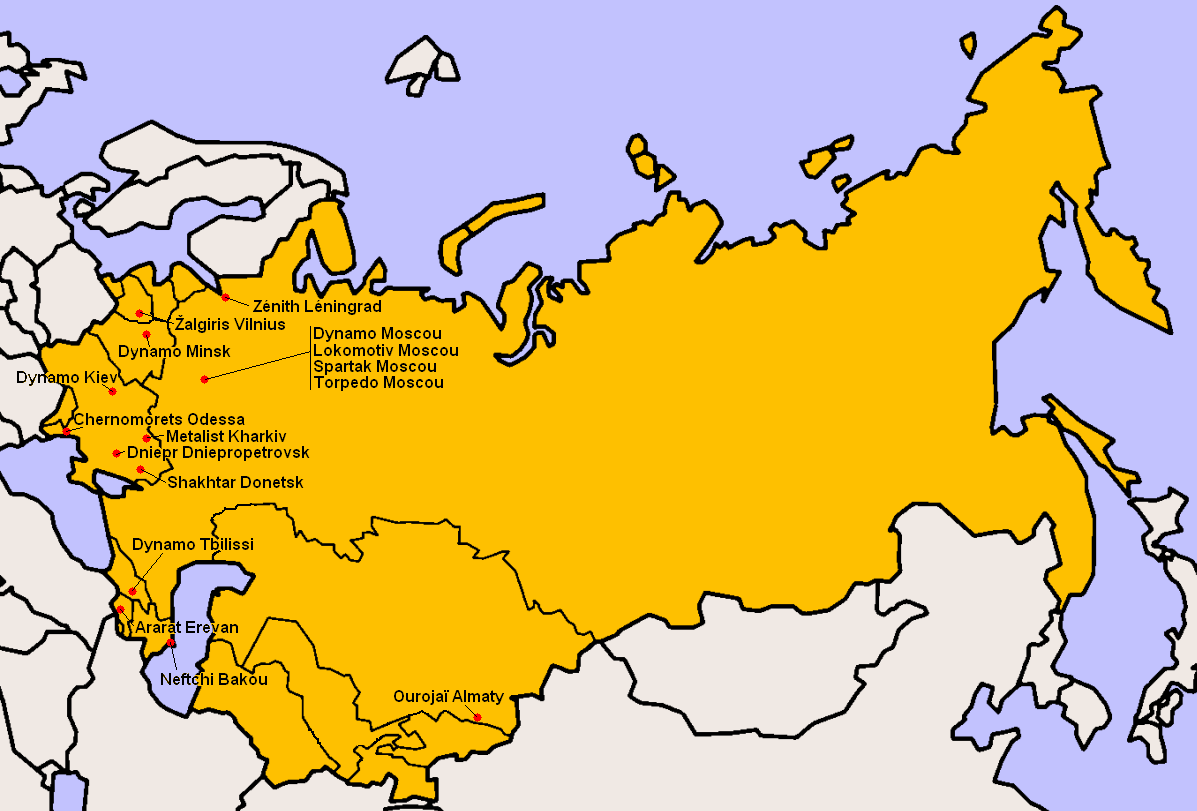
Clubs participating in the Superior Division 1988.

The 1988 season was the 51st completed season of the USSR Football Championship: Top League. Spartak Moscow, the defending 11-times champions, placed fourth this season.

== Teams ==
=== Promoted teams ===
- FC Chernomorets Odessa – champion (returning after a season)
- FC Lokomotiv Moscow – 2nd place (returning after seven seasons)

=== Location ===
Locations of teams in the 1988 Top League

== Final standings ==
Pos	Team	Pld	W	D	L	GF	GA	GD	Pts	Qualification or relegation
1	(Ukrainian Soviet Socialist Republic) Dnipro Dnipropetrovsk (C)	30	18	10	2	49	23	+26	46	Qualification for European Cup first round
2	(Ukrainian Soviet Socialist Republic) Dynamo Kyiv	30	17	9	4	43	19	+24	43	Qualification for UEFA Cup first round
3	(Russian Soviet Federative Socialist Republic) Torpedo Moscow	30	17	8	5	39	23	+16	42	Qualification for Cup Winners' Cup first round
4	(Russian Soviet Federative Socialist Republic) Spartak Moscow	30	14	11	5	40	26	+14	39 (Note: No draw limit for Spartak M and Dinamo Mn)	Qualification for UEFA Cup first round
5	(Lithuanian Soviet Socialist Republic) Žalgiris Vilnius	30	14	7	9	39	35	+4	35	Qualification for UEFA Cup first round
6	(Russian Soviet Federative Socialist Republic) Zenit Leningrad	30	11	9	10	35	34	+1	31	Qualification for UEFA Cup first round
7	(Russian Soviet Federative Socialist Republic) Lokomotiv Moscow	30	10	12	8	35	29	+6	30 (Note: 2 points deducted (10 draw limited))	
8	(Ukrainian Soviet Socialist Republic) Shakhtar Donetsk	30	9	10	11	30	28	+2	28	
9	(Armenian Soviet Socialist Republic) Ararat Erevan	30	9	9	12	21	28	−7	27	
10	(Russian Soviet Federative Socialist Republic) Dinamo Moscow	30	9	8	13	32	38	−6	26	
11	(Ukrainian Soviet Socialist Republic) Metalist Kharkiv	30	8	10	12	29	36	−7	26	
12	(Byelorussian Soviet Socialist Republic) Dinamo Minsk	30	7	11	12	29	34	−5	25	
13	(Ukrainian Soviet Socialist Republic) Chornomorets Odessa	30	9	6	15	24	37	−13	24	
14	(Georgian Soviet Socialist Republic) Dinamo Tbilisi	30	9	5	16	28	37	−9	23	
15	(Azerbaijan Soviet Socialist Republic) Neftchi Baku (R)	30	5	7	18	28	46	−18	17	Relegation to First League
16	(Kazakh Soviet Socialist Republic) Kairat Alma-Ata (R)	30	6	4	20	25	53	−28	16	Relegation to First League

Source: rsssf.com
Rules for classification: 1) Total points (If two or more teams have equal points for the first place, the winner is determined by additional single round-robin play-off on condition and place determined by the Federation); 2) Total wins; 3) Head-to-head results (3.1. points 3.2. goal difference 3.3. goal scored); 4) Total goal difference; 5) Total games scored; 6) Draw lots
(C) Champions; (R) Relegated
Notes:

Promotion

- Pamir Dushanbe (Tajik SSR)
- Rotor Volgograd (Russian SFSR)

== Results ==
Home \ Away	ARA	CHO	DNI	DYK	DMN	DYN	DTB	KAI	LOK	MKH	NEF	SHA	SPA	TOR	ŽAL	ZEN
Ararat Yerevan		1–1	0–0	1–2	0–0	0–1	3–1	1–0	0–0	2–0	0–0	1–0	1–0	0–2	1–0	1–0
Chornomorets Odessa	2–1		1–3	2–1	0–0	1–1	2–0	1–0	0–1	1–1	1–0	1–1	0–1	0–2	1–0	1–2
Dnipro	3–0	2–1		0–0	4–3	2–0	0–0	3–0	2–1	1–1	3–2	4–2	0–0	2–2	3–1	1–1
Dynamo Kyiv	2–0	1–0	2–0		1–1	2–1	1–0	3–0	1–0	3–0	3–0	0–0	1–2	3–0	3–1	2–0
Dinamo Minsk	0–0	2–0	0–1	1–2		0–0	0–0	3–1	3–2	1–1	3–1	1–0	0–2	1–1	0–1	1–1
Dynamo Moscow	1–1	1–3	1–2	1–2	2–1		0–0	4–3	2–0	1–1	1–0	1–1	1–2	2–0	0–0	3–2
Dinamo Tbilisi	1–2	2–0	0–1	1–1	2–1	3–1		3–1	0–0	1–2	2–0	2–0	1–0	0–1	2–1	0–1
Kairat Alma-Ata	1–0	1–1	0–2	0–1	1–2	2–1	2–0		1–1	1–0	2–1	0–1	1–3	2–1	1–2	1–1
Lokomotiv Moscow	1–0	2–0	0–1	1–1	0–0	2–2	2–1	3–0		1–1	1–0	2–0	2–2	1–1	2–2	2–0
Metalist Kharkiv	1–2	0–1	0–2	1–1	3–1	1–0	2–0	1–1	1–0		1–0	1–2	2–0	1–1	2–1	1–1
Neftçi Baku	1–1	2–0	2–2	2–1	2–1	0–1	1–0	4–2	1–1	1–1		2–2	1–2	1–1	1–2	1–2
Shakhtar Donetsk	2–0	0–1	0–0	1–1	0–1	2–0	3–1	2–0	0–1	3–0	0–2		0–0	0–0	5–1	1–0
Spartak Moscow	1–1	3–1	2–2	1–0	4–2	1–0	3–0	2–0	1–1	2–1	2–0	2–2		0–0	1–1	1–1
Torpedo Moscow	2–0	2–0	1–0	2–0	1–0	2–1	1–0	2–0	2–1	1–0	3–1	2–0	2–0		2–2	2–1
Žalgiris Vilnius	1–0	2–1	2–2	0–0	1–0	2–1	0–1	2–0	1–2	2–1	2–0	1–0	2–0	2–2		2–0
Zenit Leningrad	2–1	2–0	0–1	1–1	0–0	0–1	5–4	2–1	3–2	2–1	2–0	0–0	0–0	2–0	1–2	

Legend: Blue = home team win; Yellow = draw; Red = away team win.

== Top scorers ==
16 goals

- Aleksandr Borodyuk (Dynamo Moscow)
- Yevhen Shakhov (Dnipro Dnipropetrovsk)

15 goals

- Mikhail Rusyayev (Lokomotiv Moscow)

12 goals

- Sergei Rodionov (Spartak Moscow)

11 goals

- Oleh Protasov (Dynamo Kyiv)

10 goals

- Mashalla Akhmedov (Neftchi)
- Ihor Petrov (Shakhtar Donetsk)

9 goals

- Sergei Dmitriyev (Zenit)
- Vladimir Grechnev (Torpedo Moscow)
- Gija Guruli (Dinamo Tbilisi)
- Volodymyr Lyutyi (Dnipro Dnipropetrovsk)
- Arminas Narbekovas (Žalgiris)
- Andrei Rudakov (Torpedo Moscow)

== Clean sheets ==
14 matches

- Valeri Sarychev (Torpedo Moscow)

12 matches

- Valeriy Horodov (Dnipro Dnipropetrovsk)

11 matches

- Stanislav Cherchesov (Lokomotiv Moscow)
- Aleksandr Podshivalov (Ararat Yerevan)
- Viktor Chanov (Dynamo Kyiv)

10 matches

- Rinat Dasayev (Spartak Moscow)

9 matches

- Otar Gabelia (Dinamo Tbilisi)
- Andrei Satsunkevich (Dinamo Minsk)

7 matches

- Mikhail Biryukov (Zenit Leningrad)

== Medal squads ==
(league appearances and goals listed in brackets)

1. FC Dnipro Dnipropetrovsk

Goalkeepers: Valeriy Horodov (25), Serhiy Krakovskyi (4), Igor Tyuterev (1).
Defenders: Sergei Bashkirov (29 / 1), Ivan Vyshnevskyi (28), Oleksandr Sorokalet (27 / 1), Oleksiy Cherednyk (24 / 3), Serhiy Puchkov (22), Volodymyr Gerashchenko (7), Peter Neustädter (4), Serhiy Bezhenar (3), Oleksandr Chervonyi (1 / 1), Petro Buts (1), Oleh Fediukov (1).
Midfielders: Volodymyr Bahmut (28 / 2), Mykola Kudrytsky (27 / 3), Anton Shokh (22 / 1), Vadym Yevtushenko (20), Vadym Tyshchenko (6), Viktor Rafalchuk (2), Yevhen Pokhlebayev (1).
Forwards: Eduard Son (29 / 8), Yevhen Shakhov (28 / 16), Volodymyr Lyutyi (21 / 9), Igor Shkvyrin (10 / 2), Andriy Sydelnykov (8 / 1), Oleh Taran (4), Vasyl Storchak (2), Oleh Koshelyuk (1 / 1), Konstantin Yeryomenko (1), Yuriy Leonov (1), Valentyn Moskvyn (1).

Manager: Yevhen Kucherevskyi.

Transferred out during the season: Vadym Yevtushenko (to FC Dynamo Kyiv reserves), Peter Neustädter (to SC Tavriya Simferopol), Vasyl Storchak (to FC SKA Karpaty Lviv).

2. FC Dynamo Kyiv

Goalkeepers: Viktor Chanov (25), Aleksandr Zhidkov (5).
Defenders: Anatoliy Demyanenko (30 / 1), Oleh Kuznetsov (26 / 1), Andriy Bal (23), Serhiy Shmatovalenko (21), Volodymyr Bezsonov (19), Ihor Korniyets (13), Sergei Baltacha (12), Vladimir Gorilyi (11 / 1).
Midfielders: Vasyl Rats (30 / 2), Hennadiy Lytovchenko (29 / 7), Oleksiy Mykhaylychenko (23 / 6), Oleksandr Zavarov (18 / 4), Ivan Yaremchuk (11), Andrei Kanchelskis (7 / 1), Pavlo Yakovenko (6 / 1), Serhiy Pohodin (3), Mykhaylo Stelmakh (1).
Forwards: Oleh Protasov (29 / 11), Ihor Belanov (27 / 8).

Manager: Valeriy Lobanovskyi.

Transferred out during the season: Oleksandr Zavarov (to (Italy) Juventus).

3. FC Torpedo Moscow

Goalkeepers: Valeri Sarychev (26), Aleksei Prudnikov (5).
Defenders: Aleksandr Polukarov (29), Valentin Kovach (26 / 1), Sergei Prigoda (15), Sergei Bodak (3), Maksim Cheltsov (3), Dmitri Chugunov (2).
Midfielders: Sergey Agashkov (30), Vladimir Grechnyov (29 / 9), Oleg Shirinbekov (29 / 2), Gennadi Grishin (27 / 1), Nikolai Savichev (25 / 6), Sergei Zhukov (19), Aleksei Yeryomenko (9 / 1), Sergei Shustikov (1).
Forwards: Vadim Rogovskoy (29), Nikolai Pisarev (19 / 1), Andrei Rudakov (18 / 9), Yuri Savichev (17 / 6), Aleksandr Gitselov (13 / 2), Vladimir Kobzev (8 / 1), Yuri Tishkov (1).

Manager: Valentin Ivanov.

Transferred out during the season: Aleksei Yeryomenko (to FC Dynamo Moscow), Vladimir Kobzev (to FC Rostselmash Rostov-on-Don).

== Number of teams by union republic ==
Rank	Union republic	Number of teams	Club(s)
1	RSFSR	5	Dinamo Moscow, Lokomotiv Moscow, Spartak Moscow, Torpedo Moscow, Zenit Leningrad
1	Ukrainian SSR	5	Chernomorets Odessa, Dinamo Kiev, Dnepr Dnepropetrovsk, Metallist Kharkov, Shakhter Donetsk
3	Armenian SSR	1	Ararat Yerevan
3	Azerbaijan SSR	1	Neftchi Baku
3	Belarusian SSR	1	Dinamo Minsk
3	Georgian SSR	1	Dinamo Tbilisi
3	Kazakh SSR	1	Kairat Alma-Ata
3	Lithuanian SSR	1	Zhalgiris Vilnius

== Attendances ==
No.	Club	Average	Change	Highest
1	Dynamo Kyiv	54,680	-5,9%	100,000
2	Dinamo Tbilisi	34,780	21,2%	66,200
3	Zenit	32,167	50,8%	61,000
4	Spartak Moscow	28,260	-23,0%	50,400
5	Shakhtar Donetsk	26,100	-13,4%	40,000
6	Ararat	22,440	-48,0%	39,500
7	Kairat	20,753	-24,3%	28,000
8	Chornomorets	19,927	-22,1%	38,500
9	Dnipro	16,933	-30,5%	30,000
10	Dinamo Minsk	14,607	-36,2%	50,000
11	Metalist Kharkiv	14,313	-37,0%	33,500
12	Neftçhi	13,067	-64,6%	26,000
13	Dynamo Moscow	11,600	-29,7%	29,000
14	Žalgiris	11,167	-3,2%	18,000
15	Lokomotiv Moscow	6,333	84,7%	16,500
16	Torpedo Moscow	6,167	-34,1%	15,900

== See also ==
- 1988 Soviet First League
- 1988 Soviet Second League
