= 1988 FC Guria season =

Guria
1988 season
- Manager: Mikhail Fomenko
- Stadium: Guria stadium, Lanchkhuti
- First League: 4th of 22
- Soviet Cup: 3rd round
- Top goalscorer: League: Viktor Khlus (21); All: Viktor Khlus (24)
- Highest home attendance: 20,000 (four games)
- Biggest win: 5–0 v Zvezda (away, 20 July); 6–1 v Zvezda (home, 28 October)
- Biggest defeat: 0–4 v Kuzbass (away, 5 November)

The 1988 season was the 64th year in Guria's history and 1st season in the 2nd tier of Soviet football after being relegated from the Top League the previous year. In addition to the league season, the team also participated in the 1988–89 Soviet Cup.

== Overview ==
Following their relegation from the 1987 Soviet Top League the previous year, Guria returned to the 2nd division with several new players such as midfielders Gocha Gogrichiani, Nugzar Kakilashvili and Otar Korgalidze and striker Grigol Tsaava, all signed from Dinamo Tbilisi. Before the team managed to get back to winning ways, it experienced a major setback in the opening period of the season. After round 8, Guria were sitting 16th, just two points above the drop zone, which significantly damaged their title ambitions. But they gradually improved performance to move up to the 6th place by mid-season.

At the end of the summer Guria, advanced into the top five, putting more pressure on the league leaders. Amid a tight competition with other four teams, the Gurians played their crucial ties in the second half of October. First, they shared points with Rotor, followed by an unexpected draw at Dinamo Batumi. Still, Guria reached the 2nd promotion spot with two thumping home wins by late October, but yet another loss to CSKA and a consequent fiasco at Kuzbass ended their season in the 4th place.

In the cup, Guria brushed aside two lower-division sides before taking on Dinamo Kiev. After a 2–0 away loss, they fought back at home, taking a two-goal lead in the first half. Although Guria eventually failed to produce a miracle against such powerful opponents, a narrow victory over them in the return leg became one of the major cup upsets of the year.

Striker Viktor Khlus finished the season as Guria's main goalscorer with 21 league goals in addition to three more scored in the cup.

Guria continued their strong home record with 19 wins in 21 league games in contrast with another poor away performance (four wins in 21 games).

== Statistics ==
=== Top League ===
==== Standings (part) ====
Pos	Team	PLD	W	D	L	GF–GA	Pts
1	Pamir	42	24	10	8	78–44	58
2	Rotor	42	25	7	10	76–37	57
3	CSKA	42	23	10	9	69–35	56
4	Guria	42	23	7	12	71–44	53
5	Pakhtakor	42	21	10	11	64–38	52

==== Matches ====
7 April 1	Guria	1 – 2	CSKA	Lanchkhuti
	Gogrichiani 59'		Kuznetsov 69'; Mokh 89'	Attendance: 25,000

10 April	Guria	1 – 0	Kuzbass	Kutaisi
	Jordania 17'			Attendance: 3,500

16 April 3	Spartak	2 – 1	Guria	Ordjonikidze
	Jioyev 16'; Babenko 62'		Khlus 46'	Attendance: 21,100

19 April 4	Dinamo Stavropol	2 – 1	Guria	Stavropol
	Osipov 20' (pen.); Korneyev 83'		Jordania 54'	Attendance: 18,500

25 April 5	Guria	2 – 0	Tavria	Lanchkhuti
	Megreladze 39'; Tsaava 54'			Attendance: 18,000

28 April 6	Guria	1 – 0	Shinnik	Lanchkhuti
	Khlus 28'			Attendance: 17,000

6 May 7	Rostselmash	2 – 0	Guria	Rostov
	Andreyev 11'; Gitselov 17'			Attendance: 10,000

9 May 8	Zaria	2 – 0	Guria	Voroshilovgrad
	Malyshenko 31', 51'			Attendance: 13,700

15 May 9	Guria	3 – 1	Dinamo Batumi	Lanchkhuti
	Jordania 71' (pen.); Yavorskiy 79'; Akopyan 84'		Atuashvili 74'	Attendance: 12,000

26 May 11	Guria	0 – 0	Metalurg	Lanchkhuti
				Attendance: 15,000

29 May 12	Guria	2 – 1	Kolos	Lanchkhuti
	Baratashvili 37', 47' (pen.)		Hapsalis 11'	Attendance: 12,000

8 June 13	Pamir	2 – 1	Guria	Dushanbe
	Muhamadiyev 49', 85'		Akopyan 81'	Attendance: 20,000

11 June 14	Pakhtakor	3 – 0	Guria	Tashkent
	Rotkovich 44'; Kabayev 67'; Abduraimov 83'			Attendance: 30,000

16 June 15	Guria	1 – 0	Kotayk	Lanchkhuti
	Jordania 39'			Attendance: 14,000

19 June 16	Guria	4 – 1	Kuban	Lanchkhuti
	Khlus 23', 24', 31'; Baratashvili 84'		Podolyak 81'	Attendance: 15,000

24 June 17	SKA Karpaty	4 – 1	Guria	Lvov
	Bondarchuk 29', 37'; Smotrich 58'; Kukhlevskiy 66'		Gogrichiani 39'	Attendance: 3,500

27 June 18	Daugava	2 – 2	Guria	Riga
	Starkov 78'; Stepanov 88'		Jordania 31'; Khlus 50'	Attendance: 2,800

4 July 19	Guria	2 – 0	SKA Rostov	Lanchkhuti
	Jordania 68' Khlus 76'			Attendance: 13,000

7 July 20	Guria	4 – 1	Rotor	Lanchkhhuti
	Pridonashvili 17'; Khlus 66'; Gogichaishvili 76'; Jordania 86'		Nikitin 85'	Attendance: 14,200

13 July 21	Geolog	0 – 0	Guria	Tyumen
				Attendance: 8,000

20 July 22	Zvezda	0 – 5	Guria	Perm
	Jordania 26'; Yavorskiy 30'; Pridonishvili 53'; Gogichaishvili 70'; Khlus 80'			Attendance: 10,200

3 August 23	Guria	2 – 0	Spartak	Lanchkhuti
	Jordania 5', 83'			Attendance: 18,500

6 August 24	Guria	2 – 1	Dinamo Stavropol	Lanchkhuti
	Jordania 34'; Yavorskiy 71'		Kostin 70	Attendance: 16,500

12 August 25	Tavria	1 – 1	Guria	Simferopol
	Naumenko 73'		Jordania 42'	Attendance: 5,300

15 August 26	Shinnik	2 – 1	Guria	Yaroslavl
	Bilyaletdinov 25'; Popov 50'		Khlus 74'	Attendance: 6,800

21 August 27	Guria	2 – 0	Rostselmash	Lanchkhuti
	Yavorskiy 28' Pridonishvili 43'			Attendance: 17,000

24 August 28	Guria	1 – 0	Zaria	Lanchkhuti
	Jordania 62' (pen.)			Attendance: 18,000

8 September 31	Kolos	0 – 3	Guria	Nikopol
			Khlus 56'; Jordania 67'; Yavorskiy 84'	Attendance: 400

11 September 32	Metalurg	0 – 0	Guria	Zaporozhye
				Attendance: 2,900

17 September 33	Guria	1 – 0	Pamir	Lanchkhuti
	Jordania 45'			Attendance: 20,000

20 September 34	Guria	1 – 0	Pakhtakor	Lanchkhuti
	Khlus 75'			Attendance: 20,000

26 September 35	Kuban	1 – 2	Guria	Krasnodar
	Rudko 62'		Yavorskiy 11'; Khlus 72'	Attendance: 3,700

29 September 36	Kotayk	1 – 0	Guria	Abovyan
	Adamyan 71'			Attendance: 2,500

6 October 37	Guria	2 – 0	SKA Karpaty	Lanchkhuti
	Khlus 64', 71'			Attendance: 20,000

9 October 38	Guria	4 – 0	Daugava	Lanchkhuti
	Jordania 17' (pen.); Korgalidze 29', 87'; Khlus 62'			Attendance: 20,000

15 October 39	SKA Rostov	0 – 3	Guria	Rostov
			Khlus 9', 71'; Pridonashvili 73'	Attendance: 3,300

18 October 40	Rotor	2 – 2	Guria	Volgograd
	Khomutetskiy 60' (pen.), 71' (pen.)		Kuznetsov 58' (o.g.); Pridonashvili 78'	Attendance: 25,000

21 October 30	Dinamo Batumi	1 – 1	Guria	Batumi
	Zhvania 33'		Meskhi 20'	Attendance: 6,000

25 October 41	Guria	3 – 0	Geolog	Lanchkhuti
	Gogrichiani 8'; Khlus 35'; Meskhi 47'			Attendance: 16,000

28 October 42	Guria	6 – 1	Zvezda	Lanchkhuti
	Khlus 1', 56'; Zhordania 11', 41'; Pridonashvili 15', 72'		Burdin 10'	Attendance: 17,000

2 November 43	CSKA	5 – 2	Guria	Moscow
	Korneyev 18', 28', 39'; Masalitin 54', 69'		Jordania 22'; Gogrichiani 60'	Attendance: 4,500

5 November 44	Kuzbass	4 – 0	Guria	Kemerovo
	Mikhnevich 4'; Rogalevskiy 22'; Razdayev 60'; Romanyuk 62'			Attendance: 6,000

=== Appearances and goals ===
Pos.	Player	Age	L App	L
GK	(Moldavian Soviet Socialist Republic) Sergey Kvasnikov	28	6	–
GK	(Georgian Soviet Socialist Republic) Avtandil Kantaria	33	36	–
DF	(Georgian Soviet Socialist Republic) Amiran Andguladze	31	39	0
DF	(Russian Soviet Federative Socialist Republic) Gennadi Bondaruk	23	35	0
DF	(Georgian Soviet Socialist Republic) Bagrat Chaduneli	22	2	0
DF	(Georgian Soviet Socialist Republic) Badri Danelia	26	34	0
DF	(Russian Soviet Federative Socialist Republic) Temur Kabisashvili	21	14	0
DF	(Georgian Soviet Socialist Republic) Avtandil Nariashvili	27	1	0
DF	(Ukrainian Soviet Socialist Republic) Vladimir Parkhomenko	31	32	0
DF	(Georgian Soviet Socialist Republic) Gocha Tkebuchava	25	20	0
DF	(Georgian Soviet Socialist Republic) Davit Tsomaia	21	38	0
MF	(Georgian Soviet Socialist Republic) Levan Baratashvili	24	13	3
MF	(Georgian Soviet Socialist Republic) Merab Jordania	28	39	19
MF	(Georgian Soviet Socialist Republic) Nugzar Kakilashvili	28	20	0
MF	(Georgian Soviet Socialist Republic) Otar Korgalidze	28	19	2
MF	(Georgian Soviet Socialist Republic) Ramaz Tskhovrebashvili	27	7	0
FW	(Georgian Soviet Socialist Republic) Gocha Gogrichiani	24	34	4
FW	(Georgian Soviet Socialist Republic) Mikheil Meskhi	28	8	2
FW	(Georgian Soviet Socialist Republic) Murman Akopyan	30	10	2
FW	(Georgian Soviet Socialist Republic) Kakhaber Gogichaishvili	20	20	2
FW	(Ukrainian Soviet Socialist Republic) Igor Yavorsky	29	36	6
FW	(Ukrainian Soviet Socialist Republic) Viktor Khlus	30	41	21
FW	(Georgian Soviet Socialist Republic) Besik Pridonashvili	27	41	8
FW	(Georgian Soviet Socialist Republic) Grigol Tsaava	26	10	1

=== Soviet Cup ===
2 May 1988 1st round	Rubin	1–3	Guria	Kazan
	Martynov 87'		Yavorskiy 17'; Khlus 58'; Gogrichiani 79'	Attendance: 5,600

22 May 1988 2nd round	Guria	5–1	Locomotive Samtredia	Lanchkhuti
	Yavorskiy 27'; Khlus 48'; Pridonashvili 50', 75'; Akopyan 80'		Babunidze 87' (pen.)	Attendance: 10,000

16 July 1988 3rd round, 1st leg	Dinamo Kiev	2–0	Guria	Kiev
	Litovchenko 18'; Mikhailichenko 29'			Attendance: 20,000

5 September 1988 3rd round, 2nd leg	Guria	2–1	Dinamo Kiev	Lanchkhuti
	Khlus 13'; Danelia 28'		Belanov 36'	Attendance: 10,000
