= Smail Morabit =

French-Moroccan footballer (born 1988)

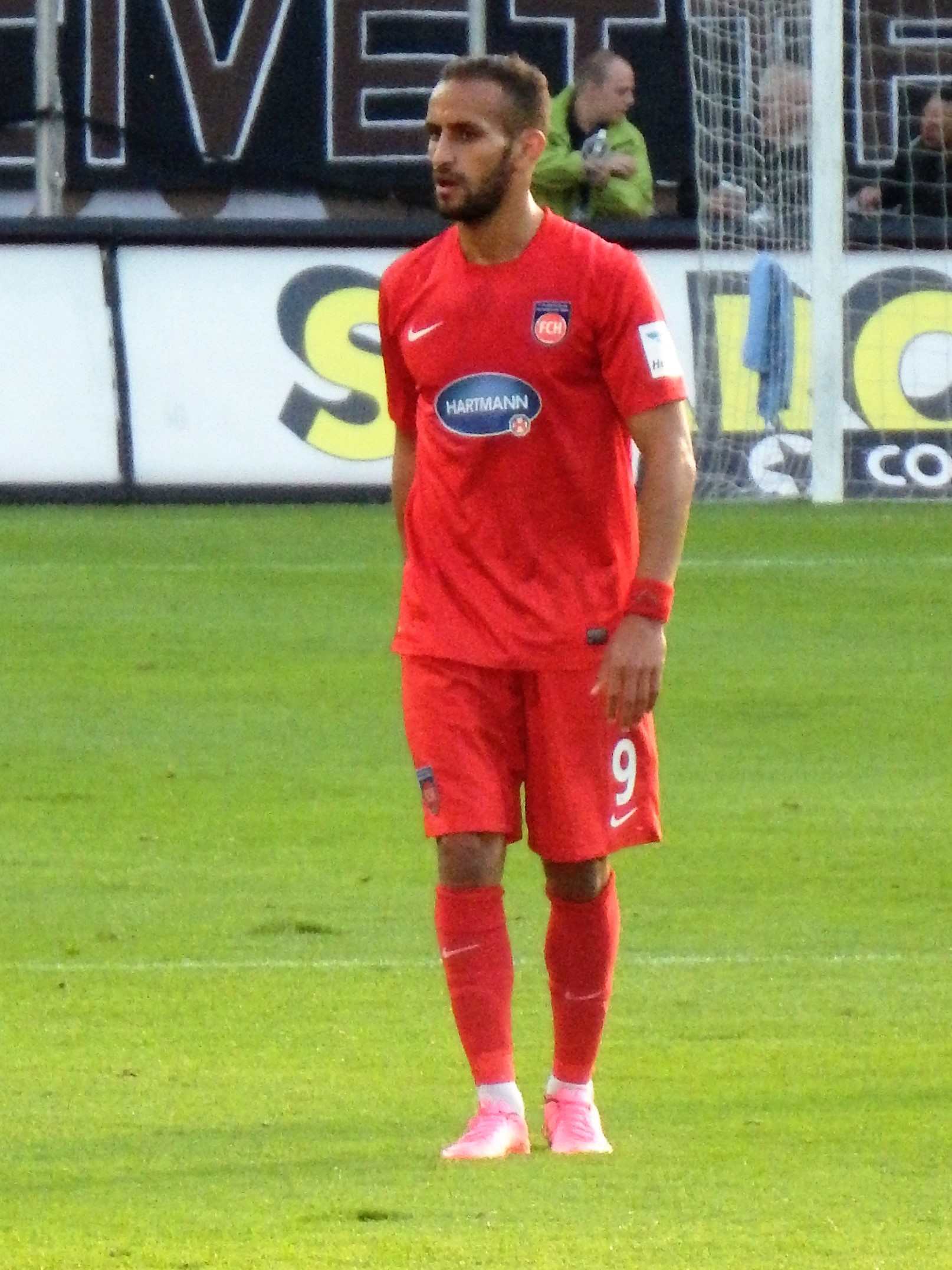
- Morabit in 2015

Personal information
- Date of birth: 5 July 1988 (age 38)
- Place of birth: Forbach, France
- Height: 1.77 m (5 ft 10 in)
- Position: Forward

Team information
- Current team: SSEP Hombourg-Haut

Youth career
- –2006: Forbach

Senior career*
Years	Team	Apps	(Gls)
2006–2007	Forbach	11	(6)
2007–2008	Sportfreunde Köllerbach	26	(7)
2008–2010	Eintracht Braunschweig	47	(2)
2009	→ Eintracht Braunschweig II	1	(0)
2010	Fola Esch	0	(0)
2010–2011	Sportfreunde Köllerbach	11	(4)
2011–2013	Rot-Weiß Erfurt	58	(15)
2013–2014	VfL Bochum	0	(0)
2013	→ VfL Bochum II	1	(0)
2013–2014	→ 1. FC Heidenheim (loan)	30	(9)
2014–2016	1. FC Heidenheim	59	(7)
2017	FSV Frankfurt	14	(0)
2017–2018	SV Elversberg	9	(2)
2018–2019	Sarreguemines	12	(3)
2019–2020	Sarre-Union	25	(8)
2020–2021	SSEP Hombourg-Haut		
2021–2022	US Mondorf	22	(8)
2022	Swift Hesperange	7	(2)
2022–2023	Forbach		
2023–	SSEP Hombourg-Haut		
- * Club domestic league appearances and goals as of 21:08, 6 June 2024 (UTC)

Smail Morabit (born 5 July 1988) is a French footballer who plays as a forward for French amateur side SSEP Hombourg-Haut.

== Career ==
Born in Forbach, Morabit began his career with US Forbach and signed in summer 2007 for German club Sportfreunde Köllerbach. After one season with SF Köllerbach, in which he scored 7 goals in 26 matches, Morabit signed a two-year contract with Eintracht Braunschweig on 21 August 2008. After two years, he left Eintracht Braunschweig on 30 June 2010. Morabit then signed a contract with Fola Esch of the Luxembourg National Division. However, after only one week and without playing any matches for Fola Esch, Morabit terminated his contract. As his reason, he later stated to have been disappointed by the lack of professionalism in football in Luxembourg.

Ahead of the 2019–20 season, Morabit joined French club Sarre-Union. He left for SSEP Hombourgh-Haut, newly promoted to Régional 2 (tier 7) in the summer of 2020. In the summer of 2021, Morabit returned to Luxembourg after signing with US Mondorf. Ahead of the 2022-23 season, Morabit made the switch to fellow league club Swift Hesperange. He didn't play here for long before returning to the club where it all started, Forbach, in November 2022.

In June 2023, Morabit signed back to his former club, SSEP Hombourg-Haut.

== Career statistics ==
As of 1 July 2018

Appearances and goals by club, season and competition
Club	Season	League			National cup		Total	
Club	Season	Division	Apps	Goals	Apps	Goals	Apps	Goals
Forbach	2006–07	Ligue de Lorraine	11	6	—		11	6
Sportfreunde Köllerbach	2007–08	Oberliga Südwest	26	7	—		26	7
Eintracht Braunschweig II	2008–09	Oberliga Niedersachsen	1	0	—		1	0
Eintracht Braunschweig	2008–09	3. Liga	16	2	—		16	2
Eintracht Braunschweig	2009–10	3. Liga	31	0	0	0	31	0
Eintracht Braunschweig	Total		47	2	0	0	47	2
Fola Esch	2010–11	National Division	0	0	0	0	0	0
Sportfreunde Köllerbach	2010–11	Oberliga Südwest	11	4	—		11	4
Rot-Weiß Erfurt	2011–12	3. Liga	32	9	—		32	9
Rot-Weiß Erfurt	2012–13	3. Liga	26	6	—		26	6
Rot-Weiß Erfurt	Total		58	15	0	0	58	15
VfL Bochum	2013–14	2. Bundesliga	0	0	0	0	0	0
VfL Bochum II	2013–14	Regionalliga West	1	0	—		1	0
1. FC Heidenheim (loan)	2013–14	3. Liga	30	9	—		30	9
1. FC Heidenheim	2014–15	2. Bundesliga	27	1	1	0	28	1
1. FC Heidenheim	2015–16	2. Bundesliga	27	6	3	1	30	7
1. FC Heidenheim	2016–17	2. Bundesliga	5	0	0	0	5	0
1. FC Heidenheim	Total		59	7	4	1	63	8
FSV Frankfurt	2016–17	3. Liga	14	0	—		14	0
SV Elversberg	2017–18	Regionalliga Südwest	9	2	—		9	2
Career total			267	52	4	1	271	53
