= Yevhen Shakhov =

Yevhen Shakhov may refer to:

- Yevhen Shakhov (footballer, born 1962), Soviet and Ukrainian football player and coach, father of the man born 1990
- Yevhen Shakhov (footballer, born 1990), Ukrainian footballer, son of the man born 1962
