= Sportfreunde =

Sportfreunde (English: Sport friends) is the name of a number of German sports clubs and may refer to:

== Association football ==
- Sportfreunde Baumberg
- Vereinigte Breslauer Sportfreunde
- Sportfreunde Eisbachtal
- Sportfreunde Köllerbach
- Sportfreunde Lotte
- Sportfreunde Ricklingen
- Sportfreunde 05 Saarbrücken
- Sportfreunde Seligenstadt
- Sportfreunde Siegen
- Sportfreunde Stuttgart

== Music ==
- Sportfreunde Stiller
