= Melori Bigvava =

Georgian footballer (born 1963)

Personal information
- Date of birth: 17 January 1963 (age 63)
- Place of birth: Darcheli, Georgian SSR
- Height: 1.74 m (5 ft 9 in)
- Positions: Striker; midfielder

Team information
- Current team: Sportfreunde Köllerbach (manager)

Senior career*
| Years | Team | Apps | (Gls) |
| 1981 | Mekagalde Zugdidi | | |
| 1984–1985 | Dinamo Zugdidi | | |
| 1986–1987 | Dinamo Tbilisi | 4 | (0) |
| 1987 | Torpedo Kutaisi | 22 | (3) |
| 1988–1989 | Dinamo Batumi | 82 | (13) |
| 1990–1992 | Odishi Zugdidi | 78 | (15) |
| 1992–1993 | Tskhumi Sokhumi | 29 | (8) |
| 1993 | Wormatia Worms | 12 | (1) |
| 1994–1995 | Borussia Neunkirchen | 60 | (10) |
| 1996–1997 | 1. FC Saarbrücken | 50 | (5) |
| 1997–1998 | Borussia Neunkirchen | | |
| 1998–1999 | Sportfreunde Eisbachtal | | |
| 1999–2003 | SpVgg EGC Wirges | | |
| 2003–2005 | SV Weingarten | 60 | (14) |
| 2005–2009 | Sportfreunde Köllerbach | | |

International career
| 1990–1993 | Georgia | 3 | (0) |

Managerial career
- 2009–: Sportfreunde Köllerbach
- * Club domestic league appearances and goals

Melori Bigvava (Georgian: მელორ ბიგვავა; born 17 January 1963) is a Georgian professional football coach and a former player.

== Career ==
Bigvava was born in Darcheli. He played professional football in the Soviet Top League with FC Dinamo Tbilisi. At age 30, he moved to Germany to join Wormatia Worms, and then finished his career in the German regional and amateur football leagues.

Bigvava appeared for the Georgia national football team in a 1990 friendly against Lithuania. He made his final appearance for Georgia in a 1993 friendly against Azerbaijan.
