= Georgijs Smirnovs =

Latvian footballer (born 1936)

Georgijs Smirnovs (born 1936) is a Latvian former football player and manager. In 2006 Latvian Football Federation selected Smirnovs as one of the 11 greatest footballers in the first 100 years of football in Latvia.

== Biography ==
Born in Leningrad, Smirnovs played football with a local factory club. In 1957 he was sent to Riga, Latvia for military service. He got to play with FK Dinamo Rīga with which he won the Latvian Cup and was noted by many as a very talented forward. After playing just six matches with Dinamo, Vadims Ulbergs from Daugava Rīga offered Smirnovs to join the strongest Latvian club.

He made his debut with Daugava in the 1st Soviet league in the 1957 and played with the club until 1971. In his best season in 1960 when Daugava played in the Soviet Top League Smirnovs scored 11 goals and was nominated to the list of the 33 best Soviet footballers of the year. Smirnovs also managed to score three goals in two matches against the legendary Lev Yashin in that year. After the season Smirnovs got offers from several top league squads, but he remained loyal to Daugava. In 1967 Smirnovs was offered to retire from playing and start management work with Daugava, but he refused and continued playing. In 1969 when Daugava went on a tourney to England but the players were found carrying contraband money and many of them including Smirnovs and Gunārs Ulmanis - the club veterans and leaders were disqualified. In 1971 his disqualification was lifted and Smirnovs played one more match for Daugava (and a couple of games with Zvejnieks Liepāja, but he himself recognized that he wasn't in a form good enough, so he retired from football.

Later Smirnovs returned to football as a manager with VEF Rīga which he brought to many successful seasons in the Latvian league - winning 5 titles and the two Latvian Cups. With VEF he worked from 1971 to 1992.

== See also ==
The Georgijs Smirnovs club is a list of Latvian football players that have scored 100 or more goals during their professional careers. This club is named after Georgijs Smirnovs.
