= Yuri Tarasov =

Ukrainian footballer (1960–2000)

Yuri Tarasov Юрий Тарасов
Personal information
- Full name: Yuri Ivanovich Tarasov
- Date of birth: 5 April 1960
- Place of birth: Borshchova, Kharkiv Raion, Ukrainian SSR, Soviet Union
- Date of death: 28 March 2000 (aged 39)
- Place of death: Kharkiv, Ukraine
- Height: 1.79 m (5 ft 10 in)
- Position: Striker

Senior career*
Years	Team	Apps	(Gls)
1982	Mayak Kharkiv	41	(18)
1983–1990	Metalist Kharkiv	210	(60)
1990–1991	Beitar Jerusalem	14	(3)
1991	Metalist Kharkiv	4	(1)
1992–1993	Nyva Vinnytsia	10	(3)
1993–1994	Metalist Kharkiv	20	(0)
- * Club domestic league appearances and goals

Yuri Ivanovich Tarasov (Russian: Юрий Иванович Тарасов; born 5 April 1960; died in 1999) was a Ukrainian professional footballer who played as a striker.

== Statistics for Metalist ==
Club	Season	League		Cup		Europe		Other		Total	
Club	Season	Apps	Goals	Apps	Goals	Apps	Goals	Apps	Goals	Apps	Goals
Metalist	1983	23	7	1	0	-	-	-	-	24	7
Metalist	1984	30	17	2	0	-	-	-	-	32	17
Metalist	1985	32	7	1	0	-	-	-	-	33	7
Metalist	1986	29	9	3	3	-	-	-	-	32	12
Metalist	1987	29	3	7	2	-	-	-	-	36	5
Metalist	1988	27	6	3	1	4	2	-	-	34	9
Metalist	1989	29	9	4	4	-	-	1	0	34	13
Metalist	1990	11	2	2	0	-	-	-	-	13	2
Metalist	1991	4	1	-	-	-	-	-	-	4	1
Metalist	1993–94	20	0	2	1	-	-	-	-	22	1
Career totals		234	61	25	11	4	2	1	0	264	74

- Other – USSR Super Cup
- The statistics in USSR Cups and Europe is made under the scheme "Autumn-Spring" and enlisted in a year of start of tournaments

== Honours ==
- Club records for most games played (214) and most goals scored (61) for FC Metalist Kharkiv in the Soviet Top League.
- Soviet Cup winner: 1988.
- 4 games and 2 goals for FC Metalist Kharkiv in the 1988–89 European Cup Winners' Cup.
