= SSSOR-Metalurh Zaporizhzhia =

Ukrainian football team

SSSOR-Metalurh Zaporizhzhia is a Ukrainian football team based in Zaporizhzhia, Ukraine. The club has been featured regularly in the Ukrainian Second Division it serves as a junior team for the FC Metalurh Zaporizhzhia franchise. Like most tributary teams, the best players are sent up to the senior team, meanwhile developing other players for further call-ups.

Among notable players was Vasyl Storchak.
