= Boris Chukhlov =

Soviet footballer and manager (born 1960)

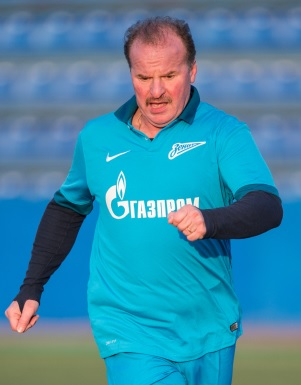
- Boris Chukhlov in 2014

Personal information
- Full name: Boris Vladimirovich Chukhlov
- Date of birth: October 26, 1960 (age 66)
- Place of birth: Leningrad (now St. Petersburg), Russian SFSR
- Height: 1.76 m (5 ft 9 1/2 in)
- Position: Forward

Senior career*
Years	Team	Apps	(Gls)
1979–1989	FC Zenit Leningrad	185	(40)
1990–1991	Ponnistus	?	(24)

Managerial career
- 2002–2004: FC Metallurg Lipetsk (assistant)
- * Club domestic league appearances and goals

Boris Vladimirovich Chukhlov (Russian: Борис Владимирович Чухлов; born October 26, 1960, in Leningrad, now St. Petersburg) is a Russian professional football coach and a former player.

Chukhlov played club football for FC Zenit Leningrad. He made his Soviet Top League debut with the club in December 1979, and would go on to win the 1984 championship.

== Honours ==
- Soviet Top League champion: 1984.

== European club competitions ==
With FC Zenit Leningrad.

- UEFA Cup 1987–88: 2 games, 1 goal.
- UEFA Cup 1989–90: 4 games, 1 goal.
