= Grigol Tsaava =

Soviet-Georgian footballer

Personal information
- Full name: Grigol Tsaava
- Date of birth: 5 January 1962 (age 64)
- Place of birth: Sokhumi, Georgian SSR
- Height: 1.76 m (5 ft 9 in)
- Position: Winger

Senior career*
Years	Team	Apps	(Gls)
1979−1987	Dinamo Tbilisi	143	(27)
1987−1988	Guria Lanchkhuti	19	(1)
1988−1990	Dinamo Tbilisi	38	(6)
1991−1993	Tskhumi Sokhumi	60	(4)
1993−1994	Tetri Artsivi	14	(7)
1994−1995	Shevardeni-1906 Tbilisi	8	(3)
1995−1996	Dinamo Tbilisi	1	(0)
- * Club domestic league appearances and goals

Grigol Tsaava (Georgian: გრიგოლ ცაავა; born 5 January 1962) is a Georgian former footballer.
