= Sergei Makeyev =

Russian footballer

Personal information
- Full name: Sergei Ivanovich Makeyev
- Date of birth: 24 July 1966 (age 60)
- Place of birth: Kaluga, Russian SFSR
- Height: 1.84 m (6 ft 1/2 in)
- Positions: Defender; midfielder; forward

Youth career
- Zarya Kaluga

Senior career*
Years	Team	Apps	(Gls)
1982	FC Lokomotiv Kaluga	1	(0)
1984	FC Zorkiy Krasnogorsk	21	(0)
1985–1987	FC Spartak Kostroma	52	(8)
1988	FC Zorkiy Krasnogorsk	37	(2)
1989	FC Torpedo Moscow	8	(0)
1990	FC Sakhalin Yuzhno-Sakhalinsk	27	(15)
1991–1994	FC Krylia Sovetov Samara	107	(11)
1995	FC Kuzbass Kemerovo	13	(10)
1996–1998	FC Krylia Sovetov Samara	53	(1)
1999	FC Tyumen	32	(0)
- * Club domestic league appearances and goals

Sergei Ivanovich Makeyev (Russian: Серге́й Иванович Макеев; born 24 July 1966) is a former Russian professional footballer.

== Club career ==
He made his professional debut in the Soviet Second League in 1982 for FC Lokomotiv Kaluga.

== Honours ==
- Soviet Cup finalist: 1989.
