= Vadym Karatayev =

Personal information
- Date of birth: 15 January 1964
- Place of birth: Kommunarsk, Soviet Union
- Date of death: 8 December 2020 (aged 56)
- Place of death: Alchevsk, Ukraine (Russian occupation)
- Position: Defender

Senior career*
Years	Team	Apps	(Gls)
1980–1981	FC Dynamo Kyiv	0	(0)
1981	FC Stakhanovets Stakhanov	2	(0)
1982–1987	FC Dynamo Kyiv	18	(1)
1987–1988	FC Chornomorets Odesa	20	(3)
1988	FC Neftchi Baku	10	(0)
1989	FC Nistru Kishenev	35	(6)
1990	FC Krystal Kherson	24	(0)
1991–1992	Orlęta Łuków	?	(?)
1992–1993	Hapoel Ashkelon F.C.	?	(?)
1993–1994	Petrochemia Płock	?	(?)

International career
1983	Ukrainian SSR	?	
Medal record
Men's football
Representing Soviet Union
UEFA European U-19 Championships
Bronze medal – third place	1982 Finland
- * Club domestic league appearances and goals

Vadym Karatayev or Vadim Karataev (5 January 1964 – 8 December 2020) was an association footballer from the former Soviet Union.

In 1983, he took part in the Summer Spartakiad of the Peoples of the USSR in the team of Ukrainian SSR. He also participated in the 1983 FIFA World Youth Championship for the Soviet team.
