= Volodymyr Ploskina =

Ukrainian footballer

Personal information
- Full name: Volodymyr Ivanovych Ploskina
- Date of birth: 25 May 1954
- Place of birth: Chynadiiovo, Ukrainian SSR
- Date of death: 10 May 2010 (aged 55)
- Position: Defender

Senior career*
Years	Team	Apps	(Gls)
1971–1974	Dynamo Kyiv	0	(0)
1974–1975	Hoverla Uzhhorod	12	(0)
1976–1988	Chornomorets Odesa	419	(51)
Total		431	(51)
- * Club domestic league appearances and goals

Volodymyr Ivanovych Ploskina (25 May 1954 – 10 May 2010) was a Ukrainian professional football player and coach.

== Early life ==
Ploskina was born on 25 May 1954, and raised in the Zakarpattia Oblast.

== Career ==
Ploskina began his professional career in 1969, before signing with Chornomorets Odesa in 1975. As a player of Chornomorets, he played the most matches for the club (473). After retiring as a player, Ploskina became a youth coach with Shakhtar Donetsk.

In 1988, he was awarded the Club Loyalty Award for the time spent with Chornomorets Odesa. On September 1, 2012 at the FC Chornomorets Walk of Fame in memory of Volodymyr Ploskyna, a commemorative star was installed as one of the club's most outstanding players.

== Death ==
Ploskina died on 10 May 2010, aged 55, after a serious illness.
