= Sergei Dmitriyev =

- Сергей Дмитриев
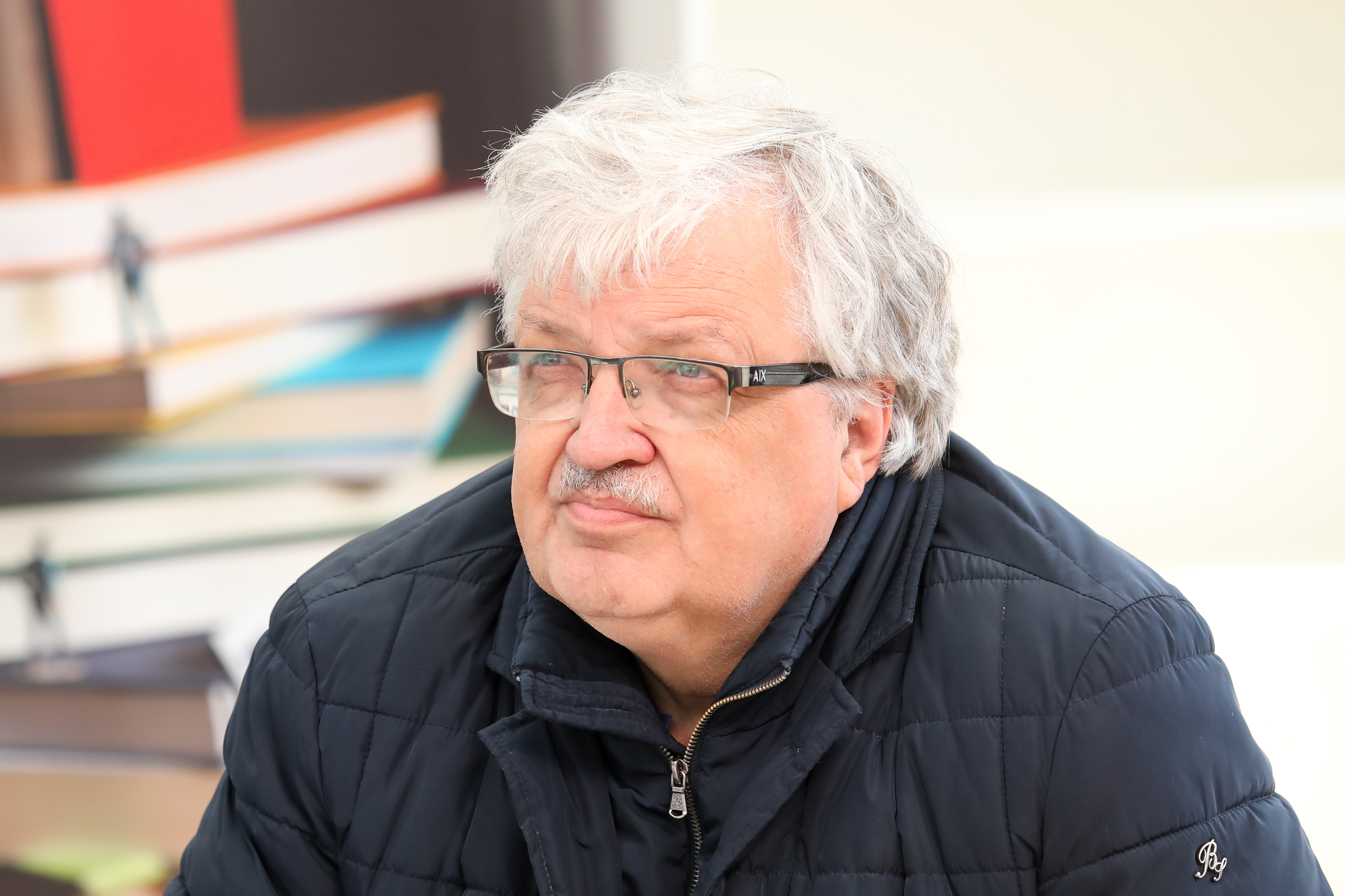
- Dmitriyev in June 2023
- Born: 10 June 1959 (age 67); Veliky Novgorod, Soviet Union
- Citizenship: Russian
- Education: Moscow State Pedagogical Institute; Soviet Academy of Sciences
- Occupations: Writer, publicist, poet literary editor
- Writing career
- Language: Russian

Sergei Nikolaevich Dmitriyev (Russian: Сергей Николаевич Дмитриев; born 10 June 1959 in Veliky Novgorod, RSFSR, USSR) is a Russian Soviet writer, prose writer, publicist, poet and editor, and a candidate of historical sciences. Member and secretary of the Board of the Union of Writers of Russia since 2004. Editor-in-chief of the Molodaya Gvardiya publishing house (1990-1994) and Veche publishing house (since 1994). He is a Honoured Worker of Culture of the Russian Federation (2006).

== Biography ==
He was born on 10 June 1959 in Veliky Novgorod in the Russian SFSR. From 1976 to 1980, he studied in the history department of the Lenin Moscow State Pedagogical Institute. In 1989, he defended his dissertation for the degree of Candidate of Historical Sciences at the Institute of History of the USSR Academy of Sciences on the topic: "The Union of Unions during the First Russian Revolution". From 1981 to 1994, he worked at the Molodaya Gvardiya publishing house: from 1981 to 1990, he served as junior editor, editor, and head of the political literature editorial department; from 1990 to 1994, he was the editor-in-chief of this publishing house. Since 1994, he has been the editor-in-chief of the Veche publishing house. Sergei Dmitriyev has contributed to the publication of over 10,000 different book editions.

Member and, since 2004, Secretary of the Board of the Union of Writers of Russia. In 1991, his first prose collection, Letters of Conscience and Faith: The History of Korolenko's "Will," was published by Molodaya Gvardiya. Subsequently, poetry collections were published: Letters. 150 Poems from an Old Notebook (1998), Cherished. Twenty Years Later (2000), Tears of Heaven (2002), About Life, Death and Love...” (2005), Lyrics of Love (2008), Poems about Grandchildren (2016), Earthly and Heavenly Love, Prayers of a Russian Poet, and I Thank Life for Everything...” (2018), published by Veche. The writer's historical documentaries were represented by such books as: Persian Melodies. From Griboyedov and Pushkin to Yesenin and the 21st Century" (2014), "Griboyedov's Last Year. Triumph. Love. Death" and "Griboyedov. The Secrets of Vazir-Mukhtar's Death" (2016), and "Vladimir Korolenko and the Revolutionary Turmoil in Russia. 1917-1921" (2017).

On 2 August 2006, by Decree of the President of Russia "For services in the field of culture, press, television and radio broadcasting, and long-term fruitful work," Sergei Dmitriyev was awarded the honorary title of Honored Worker of Culture of the Russian Federation.

Since 2002, he has been interested in photography; his works have been published in periodicals and books and were used in the design of the Crocus Expo exhibition in Moscow and Green Week in Berlin. He has also held original photography exhibitions: "Russian Glare" at the Moscow Central House of Arts and the Museum of Fine Arts in Veliky Novgorod in 2007, and "Namibian Colors" at the Namibian Embassy in Russia in 2009.

He is the author of the "Poetic Places of Russia" project and a member of the board of the A.S. Griboyedov Cultural Heritage Foundation.

== Awards ==
- Order of Friendship (28 March 2019) — for significant contribution to the development of Russian culture and art, mass media, and long-term fruitful work
- Medal of the Order "For Merit to the Fatherland", 2nd class (2023) — for dedication, personal contribution to supporting the moral and psychological state and strengthening the fighting spirit of participants in a special military operation
- Pushkin Medal (14 June 2012) — for merits in the development of mass media, culture, and long-term fruitful work
- Medal "For Distinguished Labour"
- Medal "In Commemoration of the 850th Anniversary of Moscow"
- VDNKh Bronze Medal
- Russian Federation Presidential Certificate of Honour (27 September 2024) — for achieved labor successes and long-term conscientious work
- Certificate of Honor of the Government of the Russian Federation (17 May 2021) — for services to the development of domestic media and long-term conscientious work

=== Titles ===
- Honoured Worker of Culture of the Russian Federation (2 August 2006) — for services to culture, print, television and radio broadcasting, and long-term fruitful work.

=== Prizes ===
- Prize of the Ministry of Defense of Russia in the Spheres of Culture and Art (2021) — for a series of books on military-patriotic themes
- Prize of the Foreign Intelligence Service of the Russian Federation (2020 — "for the preparation, design, and publication of the collection 'The Best Books on Intelligence'")
- Makaryev Prize
- Laureate of the Alexander Fadeev Literary Prize (2003)
- Laureate of the Valentin Pikul Literary Prize (2005)
- Laureate of the National Prize "Best Books and Publishing Houses of the Year" (2009 - for the book "Lyrics of Love")
- Patriarchal Literary Prize (2025)
