= Vladimir Grechnyov =

Russian footballer (born 1964)

Vladimir Grechnyov Владимир Гречнёв
Personal information
- Full name: Vladimir Anatolyevich Grechnyov
- Date of birth: 25 July 1964 (age 62)
- Place of birth: Moscow, Russian SFSR
- Height: 1.84 m (6 ft 1/2 in)
- Positions: Midfielder; forward

Youth career
- CSKA Moscow

Senior career*
Years	Team	Apps	(Gls)
1981–1985	CSKA Moscow	24	(4)
1986–1990	Torpedo Moscow	118	(33)
1990–1992	Śląsk Wrocław	38	(16)
1992–1995	Beitar Jerusalem	83	(32)
1995	Torpedo Moscow	3	(0)
1995	→ FC Torpedo-d	1	(0)
1996	Hapoel Ironi Rishon LeZion	14	(2)
1996	Kuzbass Kemerovo	11	(1)
1997	Torpedo-ZIL Moscow	8	(0)
1997	Torpedo Volzhsky	12	(0)
1998	Torpedo Vladimir	27	(6)
Total		338	(94)

Managerial career
- 2001–2002: Khimki (assistant)
- 2003–2006: Moscow (youth teams)
- 2007–2008: Spartak Moscow II (assistant)
- 2008–2009: Moscow (youth teams)
- * Club domestic league appearances and goals

Vladimir Anatolyevich Grechnyov (Russian: Владимир Анатольевич Гречнёв; born 25 July 1964) is a Russian professional football coach and former player.

== Club career ==
He made his professional debut in the Soviet Top League in 1984 for CSKA Moscow.

== European club competitions ==
With FC Torpedo Moscow.

- UEFA Cup Winners' Cup 1986–87: 3 games.
- UEFA Cup 1988–89: 2 games, 1 goal.
- UEFA Cup Winners' Cup 1989–90: 4 games, 2 goals.
- UEFA Cup 1990–91: 2 games.

== Honours ==
Torpedo Moscow

- Soviet Cup: 1985–86

Beitar Jerusalem

- Israeli Premier League: 1992–93
