= Vladimir Kobzev =

Russian footballer (1959–2012)

Personal information
- Full name: Vladimir Vasilyevich Kobzev
- Date of birth: 29 November 1959
- Place of birth: Barnaul, Russian SFSR
- Date of death: 7 August 2012 (aged 52)
- Place of death: Moscow, Russia
- Height: 1.84 m (6 ft 1/2 in)
- Position: Striker

Senior career*
Years	Team	Apps	(Gls)
1979	Dynamo Barnaul		
1979–1980	Krylia Sovetov Kuybyshev	2	(0)
1981	Dynamo Moscow	4	(0)
1982	Kuban Krasnodar	31	(8)
1983–1988	Torpedo Moscow	128	(26)
1988	Rostselmash Rostov-on-Don	15	(0)
1989	FC Pakhtakor	6	(0)
1991–1992	Hetman Zamość		
1992–1993	Polonia Warsaw		
1994	KAMAZ Naberezhnye Chelny	11	(1)

Managerial career
- 2001–2004: Dynamo Barnaul
- 2006: Torpedo-RG Moscow
- 2007: Zvezda Serpukhov
- * Club domestic league appearances and goals

Vladimir Vasilyevich Kobzev (Russian: Владимир Васильевич Кобзев; 29 November 1959 – 7 August 2012) was a Russian professional football coach and player.

== Club career ==
He made his professional debut in the Soviet Second League in 1979 for FC Dinamo Barnaul. He played 5 games and scored 1 goal in the European Cup Winners' Cup 1986–87 for FC Torpedo Moscow.

== Honours ==
Torpedo Moscow

- Soviet Top League third place: 1988
- Soviet Cup: 1985–86; runner-up: 1987–88
