= Patriarchal Literary Prize =

- Awarded for: Significant contributions to the popularization of spiritual and moral values and the creation of outstanding literary works in Russian.
- Country: Russia
- Presented by: Holy Synod of the Russian Orthodox Church
- First award: 2009

The Patriarchal Literary Prize is an award for significant contributions to the popularization of spiritual and moral values and the creation of outstanding literary works in Russian. It has been awarded annually since 2011.
