= Alexander Kanishchev =

Russian footballer

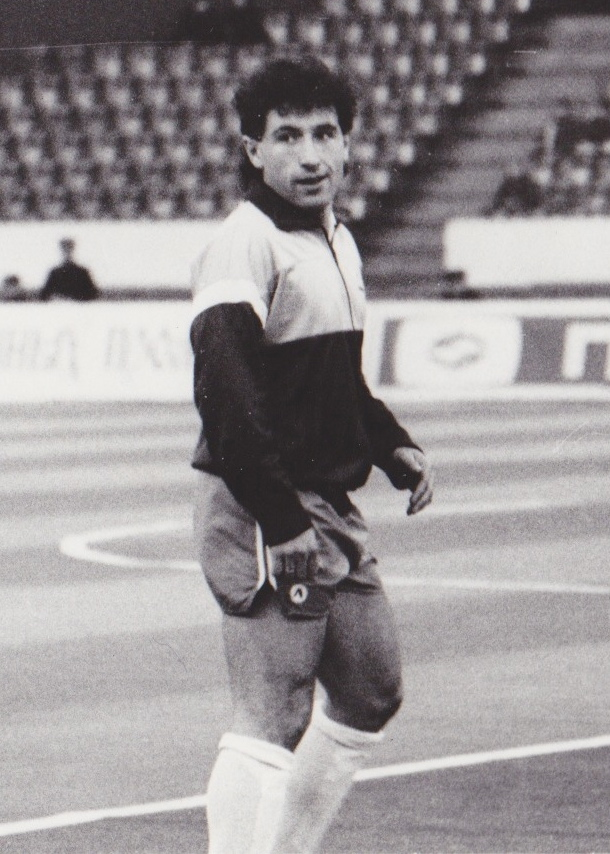

Personal information
- Full name: Alexander Vasilyevich Kanishchev
- Date of birth: 8 May 1960 (age 66)
- Place of birth: Leningrad, USSR
- Height: 1.70 m (5 ft 7 in)
- Position: Midfielder

Youth career
- 1976–1979: Zenit Leningrad

Senior career*
| Years | Team | Apps | (Gls) |
| 1979 | Karshistroi | | (4) |
| 1980–1981 | Dynamo Leningrad | 58 | (6) |
| 1982–1986 | Daugava Riga | 147 | (27) |
| 1986–1987 | Zenit Leningrad | 51 | (5) |
| 1988–1989 | Daugava Riga | 74 | (10) |
| 1989–1990 | Metalist Kharkiv | 4 | (0) |
| 1990–1991 | Stilon Gorzów Wielkopolski | 11 | (2) |
| 1991 | Pogoń Szczecin | 18 | (5) |
| 1991–1992 | Legia Warsaw | 3 | (0) |

International career
| 1975 | USSR U17 | | |
- * Club domestic league appearances and goals

Alexander Vasilyevich Kanishchev (Russian: Александр Васильевич Канищев; born 8 May 1960) is a Soviet former professional footballer who played as a midfielder.

== Playing career ==
Alexander Kanishchev began his professional career in the second team of Zenit Leningrad, when he was 16 years old, not having an opportunity at the time to earn a place in the first team, as most of the young players of that time he went to play in the second soviet league, in the team Karshistroi, Qarshi, Uzbekistan. There he played from 1978 to 1980 with fellow Leningrad players and friends Sergey Vedeneev and Aleksei Stepanov.

In 1980, he became the player of FC Dynamo Leningrad. There he played almost two years.

In 1982 happened one of the most influential events in his football career. Jānis Skredelis invited him to Daugava Rīga in which Alexander Kanishchev became famous as one of the most technically skilled attacking midfielder in the 1st Soviet league. With Genadi Shitik and Yuri Popkov he formed one of the strongest midfield lines in the 1st Soviet league, and playing together with strikers like Evgenii Milevskii and Aleksandr Starkov in 1985 with Daugava won the first league title. In 1986 Kanishchev was invited by Pavel Sadyrin to come back to Leningrad, USSR, to become the player of Zenit Leningrad. He played in Zenit for two (1986–1987) seasons.

In 1988, he returned to Daugava which by then was also on the fall. Kanishchev in 1990 joined the Ukrainian team Metalist, Kharkiv for a short period. It was the last team in which he played in the Soviet Union.

Over the three seasons that he played in the Soviet Top League, Kanischev played 55 matches and scored 5 goals, in the first league with Daugava he capped 221 appearances and scored 37 goals.

In 1991, he moved from Stilon Gorzów Wielkopolski to Pogoń Szczecin, located near the border with Germany. There he quickly became one of the leaders, helping the squad to rise to one of the top positions in the Polish second division and earn promotion to Ekstraklasa. Following that, he signed with Legia Warsaw, which was one of the most famous clubs in Poland. He played there for only half a year, when his knee was heavily injured, and after being treated for a long time, decided to finish his career.

== Post career activities ==
After finishing his career, succeeding in business, he created the non-commercial Fund for helping veterans of professional sport "Zenit-84". This organization is formed and shared by the ex-players of the Zenit Leningrad 1984, the squad, which won the USSR highest league championship that particular year, and other veterans of Zenit and local teams of Leningrad (St.-Petersburg).

The fund exists providing the opportunity to play veteran tournaments and participate in social sport events and charities. Former players of the team of Zenit brings in numerous numbers of fans all throughout the world to watch football. The main football club FC Zenit Saint Petersburg and its main sponsor Gazprom partly participates in the lifespan of the fund. This assists the organization and their players with moral, financial support.

Alexander today is the entrepreneur, businessman, the player on veterans team, Zenit, and the president of the above-mentioned Fund "Zenit 84".
