= Mikheil Meskhi (footballer, born 1961) =

Georgian footballer (1961–2003)

Personal information
- Date of birth: 30 October 1961
- Place of birth: Tbilisi, Georgian SSR
- Date of death: 6 February 2003 (aged 41)
- Place of death: Tbilisi, Georgia
- Height: 1.78 m (5 ft 10 in)
- Position: Winger

Youth career
- 1976−1981: Dinamo Tbilisi

Senior career*
Years	Team	Apps	(Gls)
1982−1986	Dinamo Tbilisi	63	(7)
1987	Spartak Moscow	16	(1)
1988	Dinamo Tbilisi	8	(0)
1988−1989	Guria Lanchkhuti	18	(4)
1989	Dinamo Batumi	1	(0)
1996−1997	Dinamo Tbilisi	1	(0)
Total		107	(12)
- * Club domestic league appearances and goals

Mikheil Meskhi (Georgian: მიხეილ მესხი; 30 October 1961 – 6 February 2003) was a Georgian footballer who played as a winger.

Meskhi was son of former Dinamo Tbilisi player Mikheil Meskhi.
