= Peter Neustädter =

Kazakhstani-German footballer (born 1966)

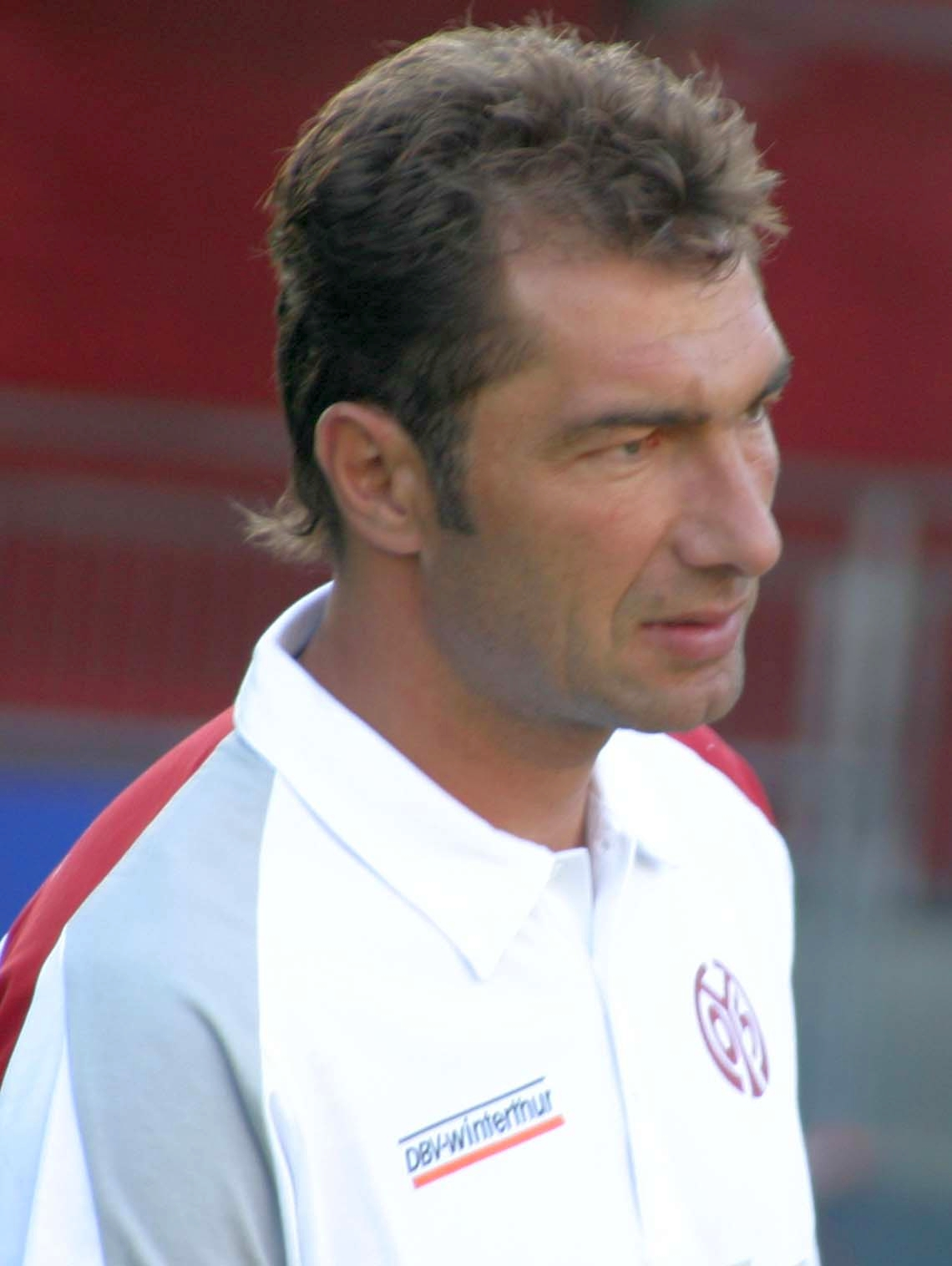
- Neustädter coaching Mainz 05 II in 2006

Personal information
- Full name: Peter Petrovich Neustädter
- Date of birth: 16 February 1966 (age 60)
- Place of birth: Kara-Balta, Kirghiz SSR, Soviet Union
- Height: 1.85 m (6 ft 1 in)
- Position: Defender

Youth career
- 1983: CSKA Moscow

Senior career*
Years	Team	Apps	(Gls)
1983–1984	Zenit Leningrad	0	(0)
1985	Kairat Almaty	17	(1)
1986	CSKA-2 Moscow	11	(0)
1986–1987	Iskra Smolensk	52	(5)
1988	Dnipro Dnipropetrovsk	4	(0)
1988	Tavriya Simferopol	18	(0)
1989–1990	Kairat Almaty	74	(4)
1991	Spartak Vladikavkaz	23	(0)
1992–1993	Karlsruher	26	(1)
1994	Chemnitzer	18	(0)
1994–2004	Mainz 05	239	(9)
2004–2006	Mainz 05 II	49	(0)
Total		517	(20)

International career
1996	Kazakhstan	2	(0)

Managerial career
- 2005–2010: Mainz 05 II
- 2012–2013: TuS Koblenz
- * Club domestic league appearances and goals

Peter Petrovich Neustädter (Russian: Пётр Петрович Нейштетер; born 16 February 1966) is a German professional football manager and former player who played as a defender. He played for the Kazakhstan national team.

== Club career ==
Neustädter played for Zenit Leningrad, CSKA Moscow, Iskra Smolensk, Dnipro Dnipropetrovsk, Tavriya Simferopol, Kairat Almaty, Spartak Vladikavkaz, and Karlsruher SC in the Bundesliga. After a short spell at Chemnitzer FC, he moved to Mainz 05 in 1994, where he finished his career as a player in 2004.

== International career ==
Neustädter played in 1996 twice for the Kazakhstan national team.

== Coaching career ==
After retiring from professional playing, Neustädter played for and coached the German Oberliga team 1. FSV Mainz 05 II. His first match was a 1–0 loss to FC Nöttingen. Mainz II were eliminated in the first round of the 2005–06 DFB-Pokal against Karlsruher SC. Mainz II finished third in the 2005–06 Oberliga Südwest season. Then they finished second in the following season. Mainz II won the Oberliga Südwest during the 2007–08 season. Mainz II were promoted to the Regionalliga West and finished in fifth place during the 2008–09 season. Neustädter was head coach until 26 April 2010. His final match was a 3–1 loss against 1. FC Köln II. Mainz II were in 16th place when he left the club. On 17 September 2012, he was appointed as manager of TuS Koblenz. He was head coach until 20 August 2013.

== Personal life ==
Neustädter was born in Kara-Balta in the Kirghiz SSR of the Soviet Union (now Kyrgyzstan). He is the son of a Volga German father and a Ukrainian mother. Since 1992 he has resided in Germany, and is a German citizen.

His son Roman Neustädter is also a professional footballer and represented both Germany and Russia at full international level. His younger brother Andrej Neustädter also had a brief career as a professional football player.

== Coaching record ==
As of match played 17 August 2013

Team	From	To	Record								Ref.
Team	From	To	M	W	D	L	GF	GA	GD	Win %	Ref.
Mainz 05 II	26 January 2005	26 April 2010	178	85	39	54	304	193	+111	47.75	
TuS Koblenz	17 September 2012	20 August 2013	31	12	7	12	37	35	+2	38.71	
Total			209	97	46	66	341	228	+113	46.41	—
