= Aleksei Stepanov =

Russian footballer

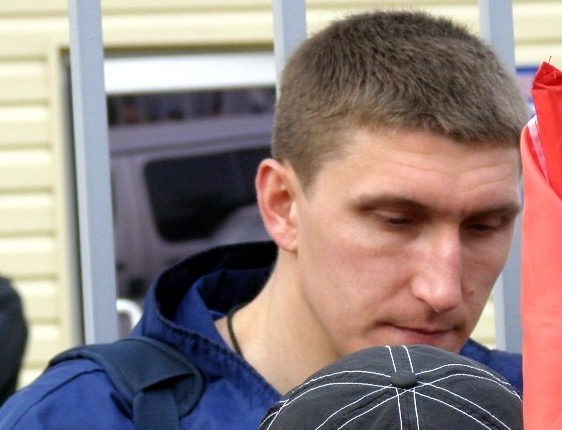

Personal information
- Full name: Aleksei Vladimirovich Stepanov
- Date of birth: 5 December 1977 (age 48)
- Place of birth: Izhevsk, Russian SFSR
- Height: 1.88 m (6 ft 2 in)
- Position: Goalkeeper

Senior career*
Years	Team	Apps	(Gls)
1994–1995	FC Zenit Izhevsk	43	(0)
1996–1997	FC Gazovik-Gazprom Izhevsk	2	(0)
1998	FC Energiya Chaykovsky	27	(0)
1999–2001	FC Gazovik-Gazprom Izhevsk	66	(0)
2002–2006	FC Amkar Perm	124	(0)
2007–2008	FC Shinnik Yaroslavl	49	(0)
2008–2009	FC Kuban Krasnodar	22	(0)
2010	FC SKA-Energiya Khabarovsk	9	(0)
2011–2012	FC Luch-Energiya Vladivostok	15	(0)
2012–2014	PFC Spartak Nalchik	30	(0)
- * Club domestic league appearances and goals

Aleksei Vladimirovich Stepanov (Russian: Алексей Владимирович Степанов; born 5 December 1977) is a former Russian professional footballer.

== Club career ==
He made his professional debut in the Russian Second Division in 1995 for FC Zenit Izhevsk.
