= Viktor Khlus =

Soviet footballer

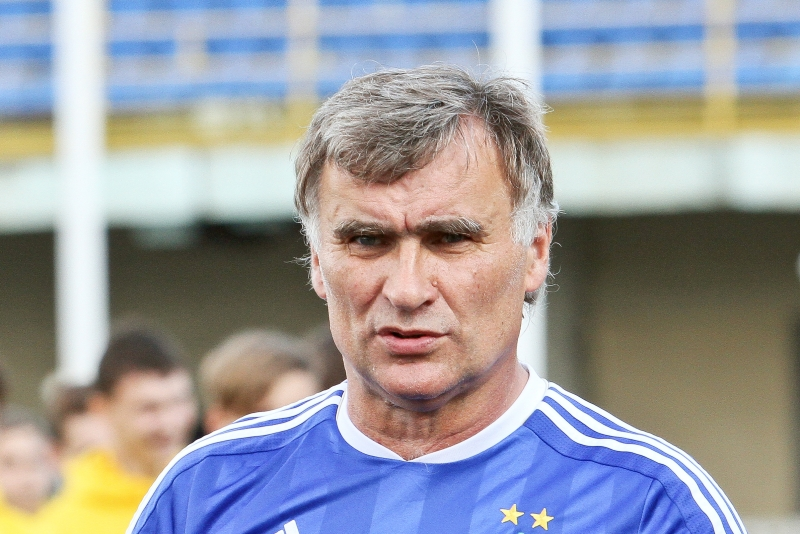

Personal information
- Full name: Viktor Ivanovych Khlus
- Date of birth: 12 February 1958 (age 68)
- Place of birth: Novhorod-Siverskyi, Soviet Union
- Height: 1.85 m (6 ft 1 in)
- Position: Striker

Senior career*
Years	Team	Apps	(Gls)
1979	Bukovyna Chernivtsi	42	(12)
1980–1985	Dynamo Kyiv	111	(25)
1985–1986	Chornomorets Odesa	21	(5)
1987–1989	Guria Lanchkhuti	72	(26)
1989–1990	GAIS	11	(1)
1991	IF Elfsborg	25	(9)
1992–1994	Jonsereds IF		
- * Club domestic league appearances and goals

Viktor Ivanovych Khlus (Ukrainian: Віктор Іванович Хлус; born 12 February 1958) is a Ukrainian former professional footballer.

== Managerial career ==
After retiring from professional football, Khlus headed the CSKA sports school which eventually was grandfathered into the Arsenal sports school. In 2004–05 he was a president of the FC Knyazha Shchaslyve.

== Personal life ==
He is married to the Olympic champion gymnast Stella Zakharova.

== Honours ==
- Soviet Top League: 1980, 1981, 1985; runner-up: 1982.
- Soviet Cup: 1982.
