= Valentin Kovach =

Moldovan footballer (born 1961)

Personal information
- Full name: Valentin Desiderievich Kovach
- Date of birth: 25 July 1961 (age 65)
- Position: Defender

Senior career*
Years	Team	Apps	(Gls)
1979	FC Nistru Otaci		
1980	FC Spartak Moscow	0	(0)
1980–1981	FC Nistru Otaci	56	(4)
1982–1984	PFC CSKA Moscow	62	(4)
1985	FC Chornomorets Odesa	24	(2)
1986–1990	FC Torpedo Moscow	103	(1)
1990–1991	FC Zimbru Chișinău	32	(4)
1991–1992	FC Fribourg		
1992–1993	FV Biebrich		
1994–1995	FC Leon Saturn Ramenskoye		
1996	FC Nosta Novotroitsk		
- * Club domestic league appearances and goals

Valentin Desiderievich Kovach (Russian: Валентин Ковач; born 25 July 1961) is a Moldovan former footballer who played as a defender.

== Early life ==
Kovach was born in 1961. He is a native of Chișinău, Moldova.

== Career ==
In 1986, Kovach signed for Russian side FC Torpedo Moscow. He helped the club win the 1986 Soviet Cup.

== Personal life ==
Kovach is of Hungarian descent. He is the son of footballer Desideriy Kovach.
