= 1988–89 Soviet Cup =

1988–89 Cup of USSR in Football
Кубок СССР

Tournament details
- Country: Soviet Union
- Dates: May 2, 1988 – June 25, 1989

Final positions
- Champions: Dnipro Dnipropetrovsk
- Runners-up: Torpedo Moscow

The 1988–89 Soviet Cup was cup competition of the Soviet Union. The runner-up of the competition Torpedo Moscow qualified for the continental tournament.

== Participating teams ==
Enter in Round of 32	Enter in First Preliminary Round			
1988 Vysshaya Liga; 16/16 teams	1988 Pervaya Liga; 22/22 teams	1988 Vtoraya Liga; 42/169 teams		
✓ Dnepr Dnepropetrovsk; ✓ Dinamo Kiev; ✓ Torpedo Moscow; ✓ Spartak Moscow; ✓ Zalgiris Vilnius; ✓ Zenit Leningrad; ✓ Lokomotiv Moscow; ✓ Shakhter Donetsk; ✓ Ararat Erevan; ✓ Dinamo Moscow; ✓ Metallist Kharkov; ✓ Dinamo Minsk; ✓ Chernomorets Odessa; ✓ Iberia Tbilisi; ✓ Neftchi Baku (v); ✓ Kairat Alma-Ata (v)	✓ Pamir Dushambe (^); ✓ Rotor Volgograd (^); ✓ CSKA Moscow; ✓ Guria Lanchkhuti; ✓ Pakhtakor Tashkent; ✓ Dinamo Stavropol; ✓ SKA Karpaty Lvov; ✓ Daugava Riga; ✓ SKA Rostov-na-Donu; ✓ Rostselmash Rostov-na-Donu; ✓ Shinnik Yaroslavl; ✓ Geolog Tyumen; ✓ Spartak Ordzhonikidze; ✓ Tavria Simferopol; ✓ Kuzbass Kemerovo; ✓ FC Batumi; ✓ Metallurg Zaporozhye; ✓ Kotaik Abovian; ✓ Kuban Krasnodar; ✓ Zaria Voroshilovgrad (v); ✓ Zvezda Perm (v); ✓ Kolos Nikopol (v)	✓ Fakel Voronezh (^); ✓ Torpedo Ryazan; ✓ Zaria Kaluga; ✓ Tekstilschik Ivanovo	✓ Uralmash Sverdlovsk; ✓ Zenit Izhevsk; ✓ Krylya Sovietov Kuibyshev; ✓ Gastello Ufa; ✓ Rubin Kazan	✓ Spartak Nalchik; ✓ Druzhba Maikop; ✓ Dinamo Sukhumi; ✓ Lokomotiv Samtredia; ✓ Kolkheti Poti; ✓ Mashuk Piatigorsk
✓ Dnepr Dnepropetrovsk; ✓ Dinamo Kiev; ✓ Torpedo Moscow; ✓ Spartak Moscow; ✓ Zalgiris Vilnius; ✓ Zenit Leningrad; ✓ Lokomotiv Moscow; ✓ Shakhter Donetsk; ✓ Ararat Erevan; ✓ Dinamo Moscow; ✓ Metallist Kharkov; ✓ Dinamo Minsk; ✓ Chernomorets Odessa; ✓ Iberia Tbilisi; ✓ Neftchi Baku (v); ✓ Kairat Alma-Ata (v)	✓ Pamir Dushambe (^); ✓ Rotor Volgograd (^); ✓ CSKA Moscow; ✓ Guria Lanchkhuti; ✓ Pakhtakor Tashkent; ✓ Dinamo Stavropol; ✓ SKA Karpaty Lvov; ✓ Daugava Riga; ✓ SKA Rostov-na-Donu; ✓ Rostselmash Rostov-na-Donu; ✓ Shinnik Yaroslavl; ✓ Geolog Tyumen; ✓ Spartak Ordzhonikidze; ✓ Tavria Simferopol; ✓ Kuzbass Kemerovo; ✓ FC Batumi; ✓ Metallurg Zaporozhye; ✓ Kotaik Abovian; ✓ Kuban Krasnodar; ✓ Zaria Voroshilovgrad (v); ✓ Zvezda Perm (v); ✓ Kolos Nikopol (v)	✓ Irtysh Omsk; ✓ Metallurg Novokuznetsk; ✓ Dinamo Barnaul; ✓ SKA Khabarovsk	✓ Nistru Kishenev (^); ✓ Atlantas Klapeida; ✓ Iskra Smolensk; ✓ Dinamo Brest; ✓ Baltika Kaliningrad	✓ Bukovina Chernovtsy; ✓ SKA Odessa; ✓ Okean Kerch; ✓ Podolie Khmelnitsiy; ✓ Neftianik Akhtyrka; ✓ Niva Ternopol; ✓ Prikarpatie Ivano-Frankovsk
✓ Dnepr Dnepropetrovsk; ✓ Dinamo Kiev; ✓ Torpedo Moscow; ✓ Spartak Moscow; ✓ Zalgiris Vilnius; ✓ Zenit Leningrad; ✓ Lokomotiv Moscow; ✓ Shakhter Donetsk; ✓ Ararat Erevan; ✓ Dinamo Moscow; ✓ Metallist Kharkov; ✓ Dinamo Minsk; ✓ Chernomorets Odessa; ✓ Iberia Tbilisi; ✓ Neftchi Baku (v); ✓ Kairat Alma-Ata (v)	✓ Pamir Dushambe (^); ✓ Rotor Volgograd (^); ✓ CSKA Moscow; ✓ Guria Lanchkhuti; ✓ Pakhtakor Tashkent; ✓ Dinamo Stavropol; ✓ SKA Karpaty Lvov; ✓ Daugava Riga; ✓ SKA Rostov-na-Donu; ✓ Rostselmash Rostov-na-Donu; ✓ Shinnik Yaroslavl; ✓ Geolog Tyumen; ✓ Spartak Ordzhonikidze; ✓ Tavria Simferopol; ✓ Kuzbass Kemerovo; ✓ FC Batumi; ✓ Metallurg Zaporozhye; ✓ Kotaik Abovian; ✓ Kuban Krasnodar; ✓ Zaria Voroshilovgrad (v); ✓ Zvezda Perm (v); ✓ Kolos Nikopol (v)	✓ Neftyanik Fergana; ✓ Khanki Yangiaryk; ✓ Dinamo Samarkand	✓ Traktor Pavlodar; ✓ Alga Frunze; ✓ Meliorator Chimkent; ✓ Meliorator Kzyl-Orda; ✓ Khimik Dzhambul	✓ FC Torpedo Kutaisi (^); ✓ Sokol Saratov; ✓ Shevardeni Tbilisi

Source: []

== Competition schedule ==
=== First preliminary round ===
All games took place on May 2, 1988.

Team 1	Score	Team 2
May 2
Baltika Kaliningrad (III)	1–0	(III) Prykarpattia Ivano-Frankivsk
Bukovina Chernovtsy (III)	1–1 (7–6 p)	(II) Daugava Riga
Gastello Ufa (III)	2–1	(III) Zenit Izhevsk
Dinamo Barnaul (III)	4–0	(II) Pakhtakor Tashkent
Dinamo Brest (III)	0–0 (5–6 p)	(II) SKA Karpaty Lvov
Dinamo Samarkand (III)	0–2	(II) Zvezda Perm
Druzhba Maikop (III)	3–1	(III) Sokol Saratov
Zaria Kaluga (III)	2–2 (5–3 p)	(II) Zaria Voroshilovgrad
Irtysh Omsk (III)	1–0	(II) CSKA Moscow
Iskra Smolensk (III)	3–1	(II) Dinamo Stavropol
Kolkheti Poti (III)	2–1	(II) Spartak Ordzhonikidze
Krylia Sovetov Kuibyshev (III)	1–1 (5–3 p)	(II) Rostselmash Rostov-na-Donu
Lokomotiv Samtredia (III)	1–0	(III) Dinamo Sukhumi
Mashuk Piatigorsk (III)	1–0	(III) Torpedo Ryazan
Meliorator Kzyl-Orda (III)	1–0	(II) Geolog Tyumen
Meliorator Chimkent (III)	0–1	(II) Kuzbass Kemerovo
Neftyanik Fergana (III)	1–0	(III) Alga Frunze
Niva Ternopol (III)	1–0	(II) Metallurg Zaporozhye
Nistru Kishinev (III)	2–1	(III) Neftianik Akhtyrka
Okean Kerch (III)	1–0	(II) Tavriya Simferopol
Podolye Khmelnitski (III)	4–0	(III) Atlantas Klapeida
Rubin Kazan (III)	1–3	(II) Guria Lanchkhuti
SKA Odessa (III)	0–2	(II) Kolos Nikopol
SKA Khabarovsk (III)	1–0 (a.e.t.)	(II) Pamir Dushanbe
Spartak Nalchik (III)	3–4	(II) Shinnik Yaroslavl
Tekstilschik Ivanovo (III)	1–1 (4–2 p)	(II) SKA Rostov-na-Donu
Torpedo Kutaisi (III)	2–1	(II) Rotor Volgograd
Traktor Pavlodar (III)	2–1 (a.e.t.)	(III) Khanki Yangiaryk
Uralmash Sverdlovsk (III)	3–0	(II) Dinamo Batumi
Fakel Voronezh (III)	0–2	(II) Kuban Krasnodar
Khimik Dzhambul (III)	3–2	(III) Metallurg Novokuznetsk
Shevardeni Tbilisi (III)	1–0	(II) Kotaik Abovian

=== Second preliminary round ===
Games took place on May 22, 1988.

Team 1	Score	Team 2
May 22
Guria Lanchkhuti (II)	5–1	(III) Lokomotiv Samtredia
Dinamo Barnaul (III)	1–0	(III) Khimik Dzhambul
Zvezda Perm (II)	0–1	(II) Kuzbass Kemerovo
Irtysh Omsk (III)	1–0	(III) Uralmash Sverdlovsk
Iskra Smolensk (III)	1–0	(III) Zaria Kaluga
Kolos Nikopol (II)	3–2 (a.e.t.)	(III) Podolye Khmelnitski
Krylia Sovetov Kuibyshev (III)	3–0	(III) Mashuk Piatigorsk
Kuban Krasnodar (II)	1–2	(III) Druzhba Maikop
Neftianik Fergana (III)	0–0 (4–5 p)	(III) Meliorator Kzyl-Orda
Niva Ternopol (III)	1–0	(III) Okean Kerch
Nistru Kishinev (III)	4–1	(III) Bukovina Chernovtsy
SKA Karpaty Lvov (II)	4–0	(III) Baltika Kaliningrad
Torpedo Kutaisi (III)	1–1 (5–4 p)	(III) Gastello Ufa
Traktor Pavlodar (III)	2–0	(III) SKA Khabarovsk
Shevardeni Tbilisi (III)	3–1	(III) Kolkheti Poti
Shinnik Yaroslavl (II)	2–1 (a.e.t.)	(III) Tekstilshchik Ivanovo

=== Bracket ===
Round of 32
Metallist Kharkov	2	1	3
Meliorator Kzyl-Orda	1	0	1
Torpedo Moscow	2	1	3
Kuzbass Kemerovo	0	1	1
Shakhter Donetsk	4	3	7
Dinamo Barnaul	0	1	1
Lokomotiv Moscow	1	0	1
Traktor Pavlodar	0	2	2
Zalgiris Vilnius	4	0	4
Shevardeni Tbilisi	2	1	3
Dinamo Kiev	2	1	3
Guria Lanchkhuti	0	2	2
Kairat Alma-Ata	5	1	6
Irtysh Omsk	1	0	1
Chernomorets Odessa	0	1	1
Torpedo Kutaisi	2	1	3
Ararat Yerevan	2	2	4
SKA Karpaty Lvov (a)	3	1	4
Dinamo Tbilisi	2	1	3
Nistru Kishinev	1	1	2
Spartak Moscow	4	0	4
Niva Ternopol	1	1	2
Dinamo Moscow	0	0	0(1)
Kolos Nikopol (p)	0	0	0(3)
Zenit Leningrad	1	0	1
Krylia Sovetov Kuibyshev	0	0	0
Dnepr Dnepropetrovsk	5	2	7
Shinnik Yaroslavl	0	0	0
Dinamo Minsk	3	1	4
Druzhba Maikop	0	1	1
Neftchi Baku	2	2	4
Iskra Smolensk	0	1	1

Round of 16
Metallist Kharkov	1	1	2
Torpedo Moscow	1	2	3
Shakhter Donetsk	4	1	5
Traktor Pavlodar	0	1	1
Zalgiris Vilnius	1	0	1
Dinamo Kiev	1	2	3
Kairat Alma-Ata	0	0	0
Torpedo Kutaisi	0	3	3
SKA Karpaty Lvov	0	1	1
Dinamo Tbilisi	0	3	3
Spartak Moscow	3	3	6
Kolos Nikopol	0	1	1
Zenit Leningrad	0	1	1
Dnepr Dnepropetrovsk	1	1	2
Dinamo Minsk	2	2	4
Neftchi Baku	0	0	0

Quarterfinals
Torpedo Moscow	4
Shakhter Donetsk	3
Dinamo Kiev	3
Torpedo Kutaisi	0
Dinamo Tbilisi	2
Spartak Moscow	0
Dnepr Dnepropetrovsk	1
Dinamo Minsk	0

Semifinals
Torpedo Moscow	2
Dinamo Kiev	0
Dinamo Tbilisi	1
Dnepr Dnepropetrovsk	2

Final
Torpedo Moscow	0
Dnepr Dnepropetrovsk	1

=== Round of 32 ===
First leg games took place on June 3–5, 1988, while second leg games were scheduled on July 19–21. Game between Dynamo K and Guria was played on July 16 and September 5.

Team 1	Agg.	Team 2	1st leg	2nd leg
First leg – June 3, Second leg – July 19
Dynamo Moscow (I)	0–0 (1–3 p)	(II) Kolos Nikopol	0–0	0–0
First leg – June 3, Second leg – July 20
Zalgiris Vilnius (I)	4–3	(III) Shevardeni Tbilisi	4–2	0–1
First leg – June 4, Second leg – July 20
Ararat Yerevan (I)	4–4 (a)	(II) SKA Karpaty Lvov	2–3	2–1
Dinamo Minsk (I)	4–1	(III) Druzhba Maikop	3–0	1–1
Dnepr Dneprpetrovsk (I)	7–0	(II) Shinnik Yaroslavl	5–0	2–0
Zenit Leningrad (I)	1–0	(III) Krylia Sovetov Kuibyshev	1–0	0–0
Kairat Alma-Ata (I)	6–1	(III) Irtysh Omsk	5–1	1–0
Metallist Kharkov (I)	3–1	(III) Meliorator Kzyl-Orda	2–1	1–0
Neftchi Baku (I)	4–1	(III) Iskra Smolensk	2–0	2–1
Torpedo Moscow (I)	3–1	(III) Kuzbass Kemerovo	2–0	1–1
Chernomorets Odessa (I)	1–3	(III) Torpedo Kutaisi	0–2	1–1
Shakhter Donetsk (I)	7–1	(III) Dinamo Barnaul	4–0	3–1
First leg – June 4, Second leg – July 21
Dinamo Tbilisi (I)	3–2	(III) Nistru Kishinev	2–1	1–1
First leg – June 5, Second leg – July 20
Lokomotiv Moscow (I)	1–2	(III) Traktor Pavlodar	1–0	0–2
Spartak Moscow (I)	4–2	(III) Niva Ternopol	4–1	0–1
First leg – July 16, Second leg – September 5
Dinamo Kiev (I)	3–2	(II) Guria Lanchkhuti	2–0	1–2

=== Round of 16 ===
First leg games all took place on September 12, 1988, while most second leg games were played on September 30 - October 3. Games between Traktor and Shakhter was played on October 15, between Dynamo K. and Zalgiris on November 8, while game between Neftchi and Dynamo Mn was scheduled for next year on March 7.

Team 1	Agg.	Team 2	1st leg	2nd leg
First leg – September 12, Second leg – September 30
Zenit Leningrad (I)	1–2	(I) Dnipro Dnipropetrovsk	0–1	1–1
Metalist Kharkiv (I)	2–3	(I) Torpedo Moscow	1–1	1–2
Spartak Moscow (I)	6–1	(I) Kolos Nikopol	3–0	3–1
First leg – September 12, Second leg – October 1
Kairat Alma-Ata (I)	0–3	(III) Torpedo Kutaisi	0–0	0–3
First leg – September 12, Second leg – October 3
SKA Karpaty Lvov (II)	1–3	(I) Dinamo Tbilisi	0–0	1–3
First leg – September 12, Second leg – October 15
Shakhtar Donetsk (I)	5–1	(III) Traktor Pavlodar	4–0	1–1
First leg – September 12, Second leg – November 8
Zalgiris Vilnius (I)	1–3	(I) Dynamo Kyiv	1–1	0–2
First leg – September 12, Second leg – March 7
Dinamo Minsk (I)	4–0	(I) Neftchi Baku	2–0	2–0

=== Quarter-finals ===
All games were scheduled on 29 April 1989, while the match between Spartak and Dynamo Tbilisi was played on 17 May.

Team 1	Score	Team 2
April 29
Dynamo Kyiv (I)	3–0	(III) Torpedo Kutaisi
Dnipro Dnipropetrovsk (I)	1–0	(I) Dinamo Minsk
Torpedo Moscow (I)	4–3	(I) Shakhtar Donetsk
May 17
Dinamo Tbilisi (I)	2–0	(I) Spartak Moscow

=== Semi-finals ===
The match between Torpedo and Dynamo Kyiv was played on 19 May 1989, while the game between Dnepr Dnepropetrovsk and Dynamo Tbilisi was played on May 21.

Team 1	Score	Team 2
May 19
Torpedo Moscow (I)	2–0	(I) Dynamo Kyiv
May 21
Dinamo Tbilisi (I)	1–2	(I) Dnipro Dnipropetrovsk

=== Final ===
25 June 1989
18:00 LST

Torpedo Moscow	0 – 1	Dnipro Dnipropetrovsk
	Report	Shokh 34'

Lenin's Central Stadium, Moscow
Attendance: 30,000
Referee: Vadim Zhuk (Minsk)
