= Vasyl Storchak =

Ukrainian footballer (born 1965)

Personal information
- Full name: Vasyl Valeriyovych Storchak
- Date of birth: 21 June 1965 (age 61)
- Place of birth: Kovel, Ukrainian SSR
- Height: 1.81 m (5 ft 11 in)
- Positions: Defender; striker

Youth career
- Kovel sports school

Senior career*
Years	Team	Apps	(Gls)
1982–1985	FC SKA Karpaty Lviv	6	(0)
1986	FC Torpedo Lutsk	3	(1)
1986–1988	FC Dnipro Dnipropetrovsk	11	(1)
1988	FC SKA Karpaty Lviv	15	(3)
1989–1992	FC Metalurh Zaporizhzhia	107	(26)
1992–1995	FC Asmaral Moscow	76	(20)
1993–1995	→ FC Asmaral-d Moscow	6	(3)
1995–1996	FC Sokol-PZhD Saratov	35	(1)
1996–1997	FC Torpedo Zaporizhzhia	22	(2)
1998	Constructorul Chișinău	11	(1)
1998–1999	SC Mykolaiv	16	(0)
2001	SSSOR-Metalurh Zaporizhzhia	3	(0)
2001	FC ZAlK Zaporizhzhia		

International career
1986	Ukraine (Spartakiad)		

Managerial career
- 2013–2016: Rosso Nero Zaporizhzhia
- 2016: FC Metalurh Zaporizhzhia
- * Club domestic league appearances and goals

Vasyl Valeriyovych Storchak (Ukrainian: Василь Валерійович Сторчак; born 21 June 1965) is a Ukrainian professional football coach and a former player.

== Career ==
Storchak started his professional career at the Lviv army club, SKA Lvov (Soviet First League) which merged with FC Karpaty Lviv. Later he played briefly for Torpedo Lutsk and Dnipro Dnipropetrovsk before moving to Metalurh Zaporizhzhia. In the Soviet Top League he played total of 31 games and scored two goals. Until 1992 Storchak played in Ukraine, but soon after the start of the 1992–93 season he transferred to Russia in 1992 where its season was coming to a close. In Russia Storchak stayed until 1996 switching two clubs FC Asmaral Moscow and FC Sokol Saratov. In 1996, he came back to Zaporizhzhia where he played until 1997 (FC Torpedo Zaporizhzhia). In the beginning of 1998 Storchak moved to Moldova for half of season (FC Tiraspol). Later same year he came back to Ukraine (MFC Mykolaiv). In 2000-2001 Storchak played for lower league teams such as SSSOR Metalurh Zaporizhzhia and ZAlK Zaporizhzhia (amateurs).

== Honours ==
- Soviet Top League champion: 1988.
- Soviet Top League runner-up: 1987.
- Soviet Cup winner: 1989 (played in the early stages of the 1988/89 tournament for FC Dnipro Dnipropetrovsk).
- USSR Federation Cup winner: 1986.
