= Valeriy Horodov =

Ukrainian footballer

Personal information
- Full name: Valeriy Vasylyovych Horodov
- Date of birth: 14 February 1961 (age 65)
- Place of birth: Voronezh, Russian SFSR, Soviet Union
- Height: 1.80 m (5 ft 11 in)
- Position: Goalkeeper

Senior career*
| Years | Team | Apps | (Gls) |
| 1981–1983 | Salyut Belgorod | 94 | (0) |
| 1983–1984 | Iskra Smolensk | 49 | (0) |
| 1985–1992 | Dnipro Dnipropetrovsk | 165 | (0) |
| 1993–1994 | RS Settat | | |
| 1994–1995 | Uralmash Yekaterinburg | 33 | (0) |
| 1994 | → Uralelektromed-Uralmash-d Yekaterinburg | 3 | (0) |
| 1996–1997 | Fakel Voronezh | 73 | (0) |
| 1998 | Kryvbas Kryvyi Rih | 12 | (0) |

Managerial career
- 2000–2001: Kryvbas Kryvyi Rih (goalkeeping coach)
- 2002–2005: Dnipro Dnipropetrovsk (goalkeeping coach)
- 2006: Dnipro Dnipropetrovsk (U21 goalkeeping coach)
- 2006–2007: Kryvbas Kryvyi Rih (goalkeeping coach)
- 2007–2008: Naftovyk-Ukrnafta Okhtyrka
- 2008–2009: Kryvbas Kryvyi Rih (assistant)
- 2011–2013: Naftovyk-Ukrnafta Okhtyrka (assistant)
- 2014–2017: Dnipro (goalkeeping coach)
- 2017–2023: Dnipro-1 (goalkeeping coach)
- 2023: Dnipro-1 (caretaker)
- * Club domestic league appearances and goals

Valeriy Vasylyovych Horodov (Ukrainian: Валерій Васильович Городов; Russian: Валерий Васильевич Городов; born 14 February 1961) is a Russian and Ukrainian professional football coach and a former Soviet player.

== Playing career ==
Native of the Central Black Earth Region of Russian Federation, he made his professional debut in the Soviet Second League in 1981 for FC Salyut Belgorod. Horodov is better known for his goal-tending performance in Dnipro in late 80s and early 90s, while playing in the Soviet Top League.

== Coaching career ==
In 2009, he managed FC Naftovyk-Ukrnafta Okhtyrka.

== Honours ==
Top awards

- Soviet Top League champion: 1988.
- Soviet Cup winner: 1989.
- USSR Federation Cup winner: 1986, 1989.
- USSR Super Cup winner: 1989.

Minor awards

- Soviet Top League runner-up: 1987, 1989.
- Soviet Top League 3rd place: 1985.
- USSR Federation Cup finalist: 1990.
- Ukrainian Premier League runner-up: 1993.
- Ukrainian Premier League 3rd place: 1992, 1999.

== European club competitions ==
With FC Dnipro Dnipropetrovsk.

- 1988–89 UEFA Cup: 1 game.
- 1989–90 European Cup: 6 games.
- 1990–91 UEFA Cup: 2 games.
