= 1985–86 Soviet Cup =

1985–86 Cup of USSR in Football
Кубок СССР

Tournament details
- Country: Soviet Union
- Dates: June 24, 1985 – May 2, 1986
- Teams: 74 ▲

Final positions
- Champions: Torpedo Moscow
- Runners-up: Shakhter Donetsk

The 1985–86 Soviet Cup was an association football cup competition of the Soviet Union. The winner of the competition, Torpedo Moscow qualified for the continental tournament.

== Competition overview ==
The competition is played according to a system with teams being eliminated after the first loss. 74 teams will take part in the Cup games, including 18 teams of the major league, 22 teams of the first league and 34 teams of the second league, which is represented by the strongest teams of nine zones at the end of the 1984 season (from the 4th, 7th and 8th zones - 3 teams each, from the 1st, 2nd, 3rd, 5th and 9th zones - 4 teams each and from the 6th zone - 5 teams). The games of the 1/64 finals will begin on June 24, 34 teams from the second league and 22 teams from the first league will take part in them. From the 1/16 finals, 18 major league teams are included in the tournament. The games, starting from the 1/4 finals, will continue in the spring of 1986. The order of the draw for teams of the highest, first and second leagues is carried out in the order of the places occupied by the teams in the 1984 USSR Championship. Starting from the 1/32 finals, the venues for the games are determined by the difference in receptions and departures for the meeting teams. The team with more trips has an advantage. In case of equality of receptions and departures, the location of the next game is determined by lot. If the game, including the final one, ends in a draw, then extra time is assigned (two halves of 15 minutes each). If extra time does not reveal the strongest team, the winner will be determined by penalty kicks in accordance with FIFA Regulations. In competitions for the USSR Cup, no more than three players are allowed to be replaced during the game. The final is held in Moscow at the Central Stadium named after V.I. Lenin.

== Participating teams ==
Enter in Round of 32	Enter in First Preliminary Round			
1985 Vysshaya Liga; 18/18 teams	1985 Pervaya Liga; 22/22 teams	1985 Vtoraya Liga; 34/153 teams		
✓ Dinamo Kiev; ✓ Spartak Moscow; ✓ Dnepr Dnepropetrovsk; ✓ Dinamo Minsk; ✓ Torpedo Moscow; ✓ Zenit Leningrad; ✓ Zalgiris Vilnius; ✓ Iberia Tbilisi; ✓ Kairat Alma-Ata; ✓ Metallist Kharkov; ✓ FC Torpedo Kutaisi; ✓ Shakhter Donetsk; ✓ Ararat Erevan; ✓ Dinamo Moscow; ✓ Chernomorets Odessa; ✓ Neftchi Baku; ✓ Fakel Voronezh (v); ✓ SKA Rostov-na-Donu (v)	✓ Daugava Riga; ✓ CSKA Moscow; ✓ SKA Karpaty Lvov; ✓ Pamir Dushambe; ✓ Kolos Nikopol; ✓ Lokomotiv Moscow; ✓ Shinnik Yaroslavl; ✓ Rotor Volgograd; ✓ SKA Khabarovsk; ✓ Kotaik Abovian; ✓ Dinamo Batumi; ✓ Dinamo Stavropol; ✓ Metallurg Zaporozhye; ✓ Pakhtakor Tashkent; ✓ Kuzbass Kemerovo; ✓ Spartak Ordzhonikidze; ✓ Guria Lanchkhuti; ✓ Kuban Krasnodar; ✓ Nistru Kishenev; ✓ Krylya Sovietov Kuibyshev (v); ✓ Iskra Smolensk; ✓ Zvezda Dzhizak (v)	✓ Dinamo Bryansk; ✓ Zorkiy Krasnogorsk; ✓ Znamia Truda Orekhovo-Zuyevo; ✓ Arsenal Tula; ✓ Zarya Kaluga	✓ Zvezda Perm; ✓ Uralmash Sverdlovsk; ✓ Metallurg Magnitogorsk; ✓ Khimik Dzerzhinsk	✓ Rostselmash Rostov-na-Donu (^); ✓ Atommash Volgodonsk; ✓ Terek Grozny; ✓ Mashuk Pyatigorsk
✓ Dinamo Kiev; ✓ Spartak Moscow; ✓ Dnepr Dnepropetrovsk; ✓ Dinamo Minsk; ✓ Torpedo Moscow; ✓ Zenit Leningrad; ✓ Zalgiris Vilnius; ✓ Iberia Tbilisi; ✓ Kairat Alma-Ata; ✓ Metallist Kharkov; ✓ FC Torpedo Kutaisi; ✓ Shakhter Donetsk; ✓ Ararat Erevan; ✓ Dinamo Moscow; ✓ Chernomorets Odessa; ✓ Neftchi Baku; ✓ Fakel Voronezh (v); ✓ SKA Rostov-na-Donu (v)	✓ Daugava Riga; ✓ CSKA Moscow; ✓ SKA Karpaty Lvov; ✓ Pamir Dushambe; ✓ Kolos Nikopol; ✓ Lokomotiv Moscow; ✓ Shinnik Yaroslavl; ✓ Rotor Volgograd; ✓ SKA Khabarovsk; ✓ Kotaik Abovian; ✓ Dinamo Batumi; ✓ Dinamo Stavropol; ✓ Metallurg Zaporozhye; ✓ Pakhtakor Tashkent; ✓ Kuzbass Kemerovo; ✓ Spartak Ordzhonikidze; ✓ Guria Lanchkhuti; ✓ Kuban Krasnodar; ✓ Nistru Kishenev; ✓ Krylya Sovietov Kuibyshev (v); ✓ Iskra Smolensk; ✓ Zvezda Dzhizak (v)	✓ Geolog Tyumen; ✓ Irtysh Omsk; ✓ Luch Vladivostok	✓ Metallurg Lipetsk; ✓ Dnepr Mogilev; ✓ Baltika Kaliningrad	✓ Tavria Simferopol; ✓ Niva Vinnitsa; ✓ Sudostroitel Nikolayev; ✓ Kolos Pavlograd; ✓ Zaria Voroshilovgrad
✓ Dinamo Kiev; ✓ Spartak Moscow; ✓ Dnepr Dnepropetrovsk; ✓ Dinamo Minsk; ✓ Torpedo Moscow; ✓ Zenit Leningrad; ✓ Zalgiris Vilnius; ✓ Iberia Tbilisi; ✓ Kairat Alma-Ata; ✓ Metallist Kharkov; ✓ FC Torpedo Kutaisi; ✓ Shakhter Donetsk; ✓ Ararat Erevan; ✓ Dinamo Moscow; ✓ Chernomorets Odessa; ✓ Neftchi Baku; ✓ Fakel Voronezh (v); ✓ SKA Rostov-na-Donu (v)	✓ Daugava Riga; ✓ CSKA Moscow; ✓ SKA Karpaty Lvov; ✓ Pamir Dushambe; ✓ Kolos Nikopol; ✓ Lokomotiv Moscow; ✓ Shinnik Yaroslavl; ✓ Rotor Volgograd; ✓ SKA Khabarovsk; ✓ Kotaik Abovian; ✓ Dinamo Batumi; ✓ Dinamo Stavropol; ✓ Metallurg Zaporozhye; ✓ Pakhtakor Tashkent; ✓ Kuzbass Kemerovo; ✓ Spartak Ordzhonikidze; ✓ Guria Lanchkhuti; ✓ Kuban Krasnodar; ✓ Nistru Kishenev; ✓ Krylya Sovietov Kuibyshev (v); ✓ Iskra Smolensk; ✓ Zvezda Dzhizak (v)	✓ Neftyanik Fergana; ✓ Dinamo Samarkand; ✓ Surkhan Termez	✓ Tselinnik Tselinograd; ✓ Shakhter Karaganda; ✓ Khimik Dzhambul	✓ Mertskhali Makharadze; ✓ Spartak Oktemberyan; ✓ Kolkheti Poti; ✓ Lokomotiv Samtredia

Source: []

== Competition schedule ==
=== First preliminary round ===
All games took place on June 24, 1985.

Luch Vladivostok	1:0	Neftianik Fergana
SKA Khabarovsk	1:0	Irtysh Omsk
Kuzbass Kemerevo	0:3	Geolog Tymen
Dinamo Samarkand	3:5	Zvezda Dzhizzak	(a.e.t.)
Tselinnik Tselinograd	3:0	Uralmash Sverdlovsk
Pamir Dushanbe	3:0	Kolkheti Poti
Surkhan Termez	2:1	Shakhter Karaganda
Rotor Volgograd	2:1	Khimik Dzerzhinsk
Spartak Oktemberyan	0:1	Pakhtakor Tashkent
Mertskhali	1:3	Krylia Sovetov Kuibyshev
Iskra Smolensk	2:1	Zvezda Perm	(a.e.t.)
Shinnik Yaroslavl	4:2	Lokomotiv Samtredia
Arsenal Tula	5:0	Kotaik
Zaria Kaluga	1:0	Dnepr Mogilev
Terek Grozny	0:0	Spartak Ordzhonikidze	(a.e.t.), (4–3 p)
Daugava Riga	6:0	Dinamo Bryansk
Kolos Pavlograd	4:1	Mashuk Pyatigorsk
Dinamo Stavropol	2:1	Znamya Truda Orekhovo-Zuevo	(a.e.t.)
Tavria Simferopol	3:4	Dinamo Batumi
Atommash	0:1	Metallurg Lipetsk
CSKA Moscow	3:1	Metallurg Magnitogorsk
Lokomotiv Moscow	1:0	Khimik Dzhambul
Metallurg Zaporozhie	2:0	Sudostroitel Nikolaev
Kuban Krasnodar	5:3	Rostselmash Rostov-na-Donu
Zaria Voroshilovgrad	1:2	Kolos Nikopol
Niva Vinnitsa	3:2	SKA Karpaty Lvov
Baltika Kaliningrad	1:2	Guria
Nistru Kishenev	2:1	Zorkiy Krasnogorsk	(a.e.t.)

=== Second preliminary round ===
All games took place on June 30, 1985.

Pamir Dushanbe	1:0	Surkhan Termez
Rotor Volgograd	1:1	Geolog Tyumen	(a.e.t.), (4–2 p)
Zvezda Dzhizzak	2:1	Tselinnik Tselinograd
Krylia Sovetov Kuibyshev	1:2	SKA Khabarovsk
Dinamo Batumi	4:2	Arsenal Tula
Lokomotiv Moscow	2:0	Iskra Smolensk
CSKA Moscow	4:1	Shinnik Yaroslavl
Daugava Riga	4:1	Terek Grozny
Metallurg Zaporizhia	2:1	Zaria Kaluga
Kuban Krasnodar	2:0	Nistru Kishenev
Kolos Nikopol	3:1	Kolos Pavlograd
Niva Vinnitsa	7:2	Guria
Metallurg Lipetsk	1:0	Dinamo Stavropol
Pakhtakor Tashkent	+:–	Luch Vladivostok

=== Round of 32 ===
The base game day was August 14, 1985

Dinamo Kiev	4:2	SKA Rostov-na-Donu	(August 13, 1985)
Dinamo Minsk	1:0	Pamir Dushanbe
Zhalgiris Vilnius	2:0	Metallurg Zaporozhie
Shakhter Donetsk	5:1	Kuban Krasnodar
Fakel Voronezh	2:0	Lokomotiv Moscow
Dinamo Batumi	1:4	Dinamo Tbilisi
Metallurg Lipetsk	1:0	Ararat Yerevan
Zvezda Dzhizzak	0:4	Chernomorets Odessa
Pakhtakor Tashkent	2:3	Torpedo Moscow	(a.e.t.)
Kolos Nikopol	2:1	Dnepr Dnepropetrovsk
Rotor Volgograd	3:1	Dinamo Moscow
Torpedo Kutaisi	0:2	Daugava Riga
Niva Vinnitsa	2:0	Metallist Kharkov
Spartak Moscow	2:0	CSKA Moscow
SKA Khabarovsk	2:0	Neftchi Baku
Kairat Alma–Ata	0:3	Zenit Leningrad

=== Round of 16 ===
The base game day was September 13, 1985

Spartak Moscow	3:3	Dinamo Kiev	(a.e.t.), (4–3 p) (September 12, 1985)
Chernomorets Odessa	3:1	Rotor Volgograd	(September 12, 1985)
Zenit Leningrad	2:0	Dinamo Tbilisi	(September 12, 1985)
Torpedo Moscow	2:0	SKA Khabarovsk
Daugava Riga	2:1	Zhalgiris Vilnius
Kolos Nikopol	0:1	Shakhter Donetsk
Metallurg Lipetsk	1:0	Niva Vinnitsa
Fakel Voronezh	1:3	Dinamo Minsk	(September 14, 1985)

=== Quarter-finals ===
The base game day was April 2, 1986

Dinamo Minsk	0:2	Spartak Moscow
Shakhter Donetsk	2:1	Daugava Riga
Chernomorets Odessa	0:2	Torpedo Moscow
Zenit Leningrad	3:0	Metallurg Lipetsk

=== Semi-finals ===
The base game day was April 6, 1986

Zenit Leningrad	2:2	Shakhter Donetsk	(a.e.t.), (3–4 p)
Torpedo Moscow	3:2	Spartak Moscow

=== Final ===
2 May 1986
?:? LST

Torpedo Moscow	1 – 0	Shakhter Donetsk
Kobzev 44'	Report

Lenin's Central Stadium, Moscow
Attendance: 35,000
Referee: Ivan Timoshenko (Rostov-on-Don)
