= Sportfreunde Köllerbach =

German football club

- Full name: Sportfreunde Köllerbach
- Founded: 1931
- Ground: Sportplatz an der Burg
- Capacity: 2,500
- Chairman: Rudi Detzler
- Manager: Daniel Magno
- League: Saarlandliga (VI)
- 2015–16: 6th
Home colours	Away colours

Sportfreunde Köllerbach is a German association football club from the district of Köllerbach in Püttlingen, Saarland.

== History ==
The club was founded in 1931 and played as an unheralded local side until breaking through to the Verbandsliga Saarland (V) in 2002 on the strength of a Landesliga Südwest (VI) title. Köllerbach enjoyed continued success on promotion to the Verbandsliga Saarland, immediately winning their way to the Oberliga Südwest (IV). The club stumbled in their first season in fourth-tier play and was sent down in 2005, but returned to the Oberliga two seasons later.

From 2012 to 2013 the Oberliga Südwest was renamed Oberliga Rheinland-Pfalz/Saar, with Sportfreunde continuing in this league for another season until being relegated in 2013.

== Honours ==
The club's honours:

- Verbandsliga Saarland (V)
  - Champions: 2003, 2007
- Landesliga Saarland-Südwest (VI)
  - Champions: 2002

== Recent seasons ==
The recent season-by-season performance of the club:

Season	Division	Tier	Position
2001–02	Landesliga Saarland	VI	1st ↑
2002–03	Verbandsliga Saarland	V	1st ↑
2003–04	Oberliga Südwest	IV	17th ↓
2004–05	Verbandsliga Saarland	V	6th
2005–06	Verbandsliga Saarland	V	4th
2006–07	Verbandsliga Saarland	V	1st ↑
2007–08	Oberliga Südwest	IV	15th
2008–09	Oberliga Südwest	V	14th
2009–10	Oberliga Südwest	V	11th
2010–11	Oberliga Südwest	V	6th
2011–12	Oberliga Südwest	V	16th
2012–13	Oberliga Rheinland-Pfalz/Saar	V	18th ↓
2013–14	Saarlandliga	VI	7th
2014–15	Saarlandliga	VI	8th
2015–16	Saarlandliga	VI	6th
2016–17	Saarlandliga	VI	

- With the introduction of the Regionalligas in 1994 and the 3. Liga in 2008 as the new third tier, below the 2. Bundesliga, all leagues below dropped one tier. The Saarlandliga was introduced in 2009 and replaced the Verbandsliga Saarland at the sixth tier of football in the Saarland. In 2012 the Oberliga Südwest was renamed Oberliga Rheinland-Pfalz/Saar.

↑ Promoted	↓ Relegated
