= Mykola Kudrytsky =

Ukrainian footballer

Mykola Kudritsky Микола Кудрицький
Personal information
- Full name: Mykola Ivanovych Kudritsky
- Date of birth: 6 October 1962
- Place of birth: Nikopol, Ukrainian SSR
- Date of death: 16 March 1994 (aged 31)
- Place of death: Ra'anana, Israel
- Height: 1.66 m (5 ft 5 1/2 in)
- Positions: Midfielder; striker

Senior career*
Years	Team	Apps	(Gls)
1983	FC Kolos Nikopol	3	(0)
1984	FC Kryvbas Kryvyi Rih	34	(18)
1984–1985	FC Kolos Nikopol	28	(7)
1985–1991	FC Dnipro Dnipropetrovsk	143	(29)
1991–1994	Bnei Yehuda	85	(51)
- * Club domestic league appearances and goals

Mykola Ivanovych (Note: sometimes his patronymic name is written as Mykhailovych) Kudritsky (Ukrainian: Микола Іванович Кудрицький, Russian: Николай Иванович Кудрицкий; 6 October 1962, in Nikopol – 16 March 1994, in Ra'anana, Israel) was a Ukrainian professional football player.

Kudrytsky perished in a car crash on the road from Haifa to Tel-Aviv while heading back home early in the morning at 4 o'clock. He was ejected out of his car when it flipped. Kudrytskyi was returning to Tel-Aviv after meeting with players of the Ukraine national football team that a day before played a friendly match with the Israel national football team.

== Honours ==
Dnipro Dnipropetrovsk

- Soviet Top League champion: 1988
- Soviet Top League runner-up: 1987, 1989
- USSR Super Cup winner: 1988
- Soviet Cup winner: 1989
- USSR Federation Cup winner: 1986, 1989
- USSR Federation Cup finalist: 1990
