= Yevhen Shakhov (footballer, born 1962) =

Soviet footballer (born 1962)

Yevhen Shakhov Євген Шахов
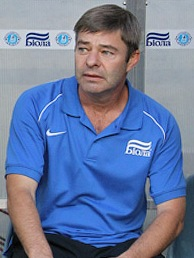

Personal information
- Full name: Yevhen Serhiyovych Shakhov
- Date of birth: 6 August 1962 (age 64)
- Place of birth: Zaporizhzhia, Ukrainian SSR
- Height: 1.76 m (5 ft 9 in)
- Positions: Striker; midfielder

Senior career*
Years	Team	Apps	(Gls)
1980–1981	Metalurh Zaporizhzhia	38	(2)
1982	SKA Odesa	28	(1)
1983–1986	Metalurh Zaporizhzhia	144	(33)
1987–1989	Dnipro Dnipropetrovsk	81	(27)
1989–1990	1. FC Kaiserslautern	5	(0)
1990–1991	Dnipro Dnipropetrovsk	25	(9)
1991–1995	Maccabi Petah Tikva	97	(16)
1995–1996	Maccabi Jaffa		
1996–1997	Maccabi Netanya	?	(4)

Managerial career
- 1996: Maccabi Jaffa (assistant)
- 1996: Maccabi Netanya (assistant)
- 2005: Nyva Vinnytsia (assistant)
- 2007: Kharkiv (assistant)
- 2008–2010: Dnipro Dnipropetrovsk (assistant)
- * Club domestic league appearances and goals

Yevhen Serhiyovych Shakhov (Ukrainian: Євген Сергійович Шахов; born 6 August 1962) is a Ukrainian professional football coach and former player. In 2009, he was an assistant coach with Dnipro Dnipropetrovsk.

== Personal life ==
His son, also named Yevhen, is also a professional footballer.

== Honours ==
- Soviet Top League champion: 1988.
- Soviet Top League runner-up: 1987, 1989.
- Soviet Top League top scorer: 1988 (16 goals).
- Soviet Cup winner: 1989.
- USSR Super Cup winner: 1989.
- USSR Federation Cup winner: 1989.
- USSR Federation Cup finalist: 1990.

== European club competitions ==
With FC Dnipro Dnipropetrovsk.

- 1988–89 UEFA Cup: 2 games.
- 1989–90 European Cup: 3 games.
- 1990–91 UEFA Cup: 2 games, 1 goal.
