= Anton Shokh =

Kazakhstani footballer (1960–2009)

Anton Shokh Антон Шох
Personal information
- Full name: Anton Rokhusovich Shokh
- Date of birth: 5 January 1960
- Place of birth: Dzhambul, now Taraz, Kazakh SSR
- Date of death: 7 March 2009 (aged 49)
- Place of death: Oskemen, Kazakhstan
- Height: 1.84 m (6 ft 0 in)
- Position: Midfielder

Senior career*
Years	Team	Apps	(Gls)
1979–1985	Kairat	170	(21)
1986–1989	Dnipro Dnipropetrovsk	86	(5)
1989–1990	LASK		
1990	Metalurh Zaporizhya	25	(2)
1990–1991	Hapoel Tzafririm Holon		
1991	Rotor Volgograd	14	(0)
1992	Nyva Ternopil	2	(0)
1992–1993	Kremin Kremenchuk	2	(0)
1993	RoPS	20	(1)
1994	FC Lada Togliatti	0	(0)
1994–1995	MFC Mykolaiv	11	(3)

International career
1979	Kazakh SSR		

Managerial career
- 1995–1996: MFC Mykolaiv (assistant)
- 1997: FC Spartak-Orekhovo Orekhovo-Zuyevo (assistant)
- 1998: Navbahor Namangan (assistant)
- 2000–2001: Sokol Saratov (assistant)
- 2002: Rotor Volgograd (reserves)
- 2003: Rotor Volgograd (assistant)
- 2004: FC Ekibastuzets (assistant)
- 2005: Kazakhstan U21
- 2007: Sodovik Sterlitamak (assistant)
- 2009: Atyrau
- 2009: Kazakhstan U21
- * Club domestic league appearances and goals

Anton Rokhusovich Shokh (Russian: Антон Рохусович Шох; 5 January 1960 – 7 March 2009) was a Kazakhstani professional football player and coach.

He also held Russian citizenship. He made his professional debut in the Soviet Top League in 1979 for Kairat.

== Honours ==
- Soviet Top League: 1988; runner-up 1987, 1989
- Soviet Cup: 1989
- USSR Federation Cup: 1986, 1989
- USSR Super Cup: 1989

== European club competitions ==
With FC Dnipro Dnipropetrovsk

- 1986–87 UEFA Cup: 2 games.
- 1988–89 UEFA Cup: 2 games.
- 1989–90 European Cup: 1 game.
