= 1981 Season's Cup =

Dinamo Kiev	Shakhter Donetsk
1	1
- Date: 17 March 1981
- Venue: Stadion Lokomotiv, Simferopol
- Referee: Aleksandr Mushkovets

The 1981 Season's Cup became the second edition of Season's Cup, an annual football match contested by the winners of the previous season's Soviet Top League and Soviet Cup competitions.

The match was played at the Stadion Lokomotiv, Simferopol, on 17 March 1981, and contested by league winner Dinamo Kiev and cup winner Shakhter Donetsk. Shakhter Donetsk won it on penalty shootout.

== Match ==
=== Details ===
17 March 1981

Dinamo Kiev	1–1	Shakhter Donetsk
Boiko 41'	Report; Report (2)	Kravchenko 52'
Penalties
Yurchyshyn (penalty scored); Blokhin (penalty scored); Bezsonov (penalty scored); Baltacha (penalty scored); Konkov (penalty scored)	5–4	(penalty scored) Sokolovsky; (penalty scored) Bondarenko; (penalty scored) Horbunov; (penalty scored) Kravchenko; (penalty missed) Starukhin

Stadion Lokomotiv, Simferopol
Referee: Aleksandr Mushkovets

Dinamo Kiev	Shakhter Donetsk

GK	(Soviet Union) Yuriy Romenskyi
MF	(Soviet Union) Anatoliy Konkov
DF	(Soviet Union) Sergei Baltacha
DF	(Soviet Union) Andriy Bal
MF	(Soviet Union) Volodymyr Bezsonov
DF	(Soviet Union) Volodymyr Lozynskyi
MF	(Soviet Union) Leonid Buryak	(substituted off) 52'
MF	(Soviet Union) Aleksandr Khapsalis	(substituted off) 55'
DF	(Soviet Union) Oleksandr Boiko
FW	(Soviet Union) Volodymyr Veremeyev	(substituted off) 70'
FW	(Soviet Union) Oleh Blokhin
Substitutes:
DF	(Soviet Union) Anatoliy Demyanenko	(substituted in) 52'
MF	(Soviet Union) Vadym Yevtushenko	(substituted in) 55'
DF	(Soviet Union) Stepan Yurchyshyn	(substituted in) 70'
Manager :
	(Soviet Union) Valeriy Lobanovskyi

GK	(Soviet Union) Viktor Chanov
DF	(Soviet Union) Oleksiy Varnavskyi
DF	(Soviet Union) Valeriy Horbunov
DF	(Soviet Union) Viktor Kondratov
DF	(Soviet Union) Oleksandr Sopko
MF	(Soviet Union) Valeriy Rudakov		(substituted off) 46'
FW	(Soviet Union) Volodymyr Rohovsky
MF	(Soviet Union) Mykhaylo Sokolovsky
FW	(Soviet Union) Vitaliy Starukhin
MF	(Soviet Union) Valeriy Hoshkoderia		(substituted off) 94'
FW	(Soviet Union) Viktor Hrachov
Substitutes:
MF	(Soviet Union) Serhiy Kravchenko	52'	(substituted in) 46'
FW	(Soviet Union) Yuriy Bondarenko		(substituted in) 94'
Manager :
	(Soviet Union) Viktor Nosov

== See also ==
- Klasychne derby
