= 1989 Soviet Top League =

52nd season of top-tier football league in Soviet Union

Soviet Top League
- Season: 1989
- Dates: March 11 — October 27, 1989
- Champions: FC Spartak Moscow (12th season)
- Relegated: Lokomotiv Moscow; Zenit Leningrad; Dinamo Tbilisi (withdrew); Guria Lanchkhuti (withdrew)
- European Cup: Spartak Moscow
- Cup Winners' Cup: Dynamo Kyiv
- UEFA Cup: Dnipro Dnipropetrovsk; Torpedo Moscow; Chernomorets Odessa
- Matches: 240
- Goals: 522 (2.18 per match)
- Top goalscorer: (16) Sergei Radionov (Spartak Moscow)

The 1989 Soviet Top League season was the 52nd since its establishment. Dnepr Dnepropetrovsk, the defending 2-times champions, came in second this season.

The season began on 11 March with six games played on the date and lasted until 27 October 1989. The season was won by FC Spartak Moscow.

== Teams ==
=== Promoted teams ===
- FC Pamir Dushanbe – champion (debut)
- FC Rotor Volgograd – 2nd place (returning for the first time since 1950 after 39 seasons, known as Torpedo Stalingrad)

=== Location ===
Location of teams in the 1989 Soviet Top League.

== Final standings ==
Pos	Team	Pld	W	D	L	GF	GA	GD	Pts	Qualification or relegation
1	(Russian Soviet Federative Socialist Republic) Spartak Moscow (C)	30	17	10	3	49	19	+30	44	Qualification for European Cup first round
2	(Ukrainian Soviet Socialist Republic) Dnipro Dnipropetrovsk	30	18	6	6	47	27	+20	42	Qualification for UEFA Cup first round
3	(Ukrainian Soviet Socialist Republic) Dynamo Kyiv	30	13	12	5	44	27	+17	38	Qualification for Cup Winners' Cup first round
4	(Lithuanian Soviet Socialist Republic) Žalgiris Vilnius (X)	30	14	8	8	39	29	+10	36	Surrendered its qualification for UEFA competitions
5	(Russian Soviet Federative Socialist Republic) Torpedo Moscow	30	11	13	6	40	26	+14	35	Qualification for UEFA Cup first round
6	(Ukrainian Soviet Socialist Republic) Chornomorets Odesa	30	11	9	10	40	41	−1	31	Qualification for UEFA Cup first round (Note: Qualified to Europe instead of Žalgiris Vilnius)
7	(Ukrainian Soviet Socialist Republic) Metalist Kharkiv	30	10	10	10	30	33	−3	30	
8	(Russian Soviet Federative Socialist Republic) Dinamo Moscow	30	9	12	9	31	26	+5	30	
9	(Byelorussian Soviet Socialist Republic) Dinamo Minsk	30	11	7	12	35	33	+2	29	
10	(Russian Soviet Federative Socialist Republic) Rotor Volgograd	30	9	9	12	28	35	−7	27	
11	(Georgian Soviet Socialist Republic) Dinamo Tbilisi (X)	30	6	13	11	27	32	−5	25	
12	(Armenian Soviet Socialist Republic) Ararat Yerevan	30	8	8	14	25	41	−16	24	
13	(Tajik Soviet Socialist Republic) Pamir Dushanbe	30	7	10	13	20	38	−18	24	
14	(Ukrainian Soviet Socialist Republic) Shakhtar Donetsk	30	9	5	16	24	36	−12	23	
15	(Russian Soviet Federative Socialist Republic) Lokomotiv Moscow (R)	30	7	9	14	20	32	−12	23	Relegation to First League
16	(Russian Soviet Federative Socialist Republic) Zenit Leningrad (R)	30	5	9	16	24	48	−24	19	Relegation to First League

Rules for classification: 1) Total points (If two or more teams have equal points for the first place, the winner is determined by additional single round-robin play-off on condition and place determined by the Federation); 2) Total wins; 3) Head-to-head results (3.1. points 3.2. goal difference 3.3. goal scored); 4) Total goal difference; 5) Total games scored; 6) Draw lots
(C) Champions; (R) Relegated; (X) Quit the Football Federation of the Soviet Union after this season and joined the leagues of their native countries. For the following season, the league was reduced to 13 teams as Žalgiris would quit after their first game of the new season.

== Results ==
Home \ Away	ARA	CHO	DNI	DYK	DMN	DYN	DTB	LOK	MKH	PAM	ROT	SHA	SPA	TOR	ŽAL	ZEN
Ararat Yerevan		3–1	0–1	0–3	1–0	0–0	0–0	0–2	0–0	2–2	2–1	2–0	0–0	1–0	0–0	3–0
Chornomorets Odessa	3–1		1–1	1–1	3–2	2–2	1–1	1–0	2–0	3–0	2–0	2–1	2–3	1–1	1–0	3–2
Dnipro	4–2	3–1		2–1	2–1	0–0	3–0	2–1	2–0	2–0	3–1	2–1	1–0	2–2	1–2	2–0
Dynamo Kyiv	4–1	4–0	1–0		2–0	0–0	2–2	3–0	1–0	1–0	2–0	1–0	1–4	2–2	2–1	0–0
Dinamo Minsk	2–0	0–0	4–1	0–1		2–1	1–0	1–1	0–1	2–1	2–0	1–1	0–1	0–2	2–0	1–1
Dynamo Moscow	6–1	1–2	0–1	1–1	1–1		1–0	2–0	0–3	0–0	1–0	3–0	0–0	0–0	1–3	3–0
Dinamo Tbilisi	1–1	0–0	2–0	2–2	1–2	1–2		1–1	2–1	1–1	1–1	2–1	0–1	1–1	3–1	2–1
Lokomotiv Moscow	1–0	1–1	0–1	1–3	0–1	0–1	2–1		0–1	0–2	0–0	1–0	0–0	2–0	3–1	1–1
Metalist Kharkiv	0–0	2–1	0–4	0–0	0–0	0–1	2–1	0–1		1–1	1–0	2–1	3–3	2–1	0–0	4–1
Pamir Dushanbe	1–0	1–1	0–1	0–0	1–2	1–1	1–0	1–0	0–0		1–1	1–0	0–0	0–2	1–0	2–0
Rotor Volgograd	2–0	2–1	0–0	0–0	2–1	2–0	1–1	4–0	3–2	1–0		2–1	0–3	2–2	1–1	2–1
Shakhtar Donetsk	1–2	2–1	0–0	3–3	3–2	1–0	1–0	1–0	1–2	2–0	0–0		0–1	0–0	1–0	1–0
Spartak Moscow	1–0	1–0	2–1	2–1	3–2	1–1	0–1	1–1	3–0	6–2	1–0	2–0		0–0	4–0	0–0
Torpedo Moscow	2–0	5–2	2–2	2–0	1–2	3–2	0–0	1–0	1–0	4–0	2–0	0–1	0–0		0–1	2–1
Žalgiris Vilnius	3–2	1–0	2–1	1–0	1–1	0–0	1–0	0–0	1–1	4–0	2–0	3–0	2–1	1–1		4–0
Zenit Leningrad	0–1	0–1	1–2	2–2	1–0	1–0	0–0	1–1	2–2	1–0	2–0	1–0	1–5	1–1	2–3	

Legend: Blue = home team win; Yellow = draw; Red = away team win.

== Top scorers ==
16 goals

- Sergey Rodionov (Spartak Moscow)

13 goals

- Georgi Kondratyev (Chornomorets)

11 goals

- Igor Dobrovolsky (Dinamo Moscow)
- Vladimir Grechnev (Torpedo Moscow)
- Igor Kolyvanov (Dinamo Moscow)
- Yuri Savichev (Torpedo Moscow)
- Valeri Shmarov (Spartak Moscow)

10 goals

- Mykola Kudrytsky (Dnipro)

9 goals

- Mikhail Rusyayev (Lokomotiv Moscow)
- Yuri Tarasov (Metalist)

== Clean sheets ==
Сухие матчи вратарей Чемпионат СССР 1989. Высшая лига - статистика игроков

17 matches

- Stanislav Cherchesov (Spartak Moscow)

13 matches

- Valeri Sarychev (Torpedo Moscow)

11 matches

- Andrei Manannikov (Pamir Dushanbe)
- Valdemaras Martinkenas (Zalgiris Vilnius)

10 matches

- Viktor Chanov (Dynamo Kyiv)

9 matches

- Dmitriy Kharine (Dynamo Moscow)
- Valeriy Horodov (Dnipro Dnipropetrovsk)
- Ihor Kutepov (Metalist Kharkiv)
- Mykhailo Mykhailov (Shakhtar Donetsk)

== Medal squads ==
(league appearances and goals listed in brackets)

1. FC Spartak Moscow

Goalkeepers: Stanislav Cherchesov (30), Aleksei Prudnikov (2).
Defenders: Vasili Kulkov (30 / 1), Gennady Morozov (25 / 1), Aleksandr Bokiy (23), Sergei Bazulev (21), Boris Pozdnyakov (17), Yuri Susloparov (12), Aleksandr Bubnov (11), Boris Kuznetsov (5), Dmitri Gradilenko (1), Vladimir Sochnov (1).
Midfielders: Fyodor Cherenkov (28 / 7), Yevgeni Kuznetsov (26 / 2), Viktor Pasulko (22 / 3), Igor Shalimov (20 / 1), Vladimir Kapustin (12), Aleksandr Mostovoi (11 / 3), Andrei Ivanov (10), Sergei Novikov (6 / 2), Valeri Shikunov (1).
Forwards: Sergey Rodionov (28 / 16), Valeri Shmarov (27 / 11), Dmitri Popov (5).

One own goal each scored by Serhiy Kuznetsov (FC Chornomorets Odesa) and Gennady Lesun (FC Dinamo Minsk).

Manager: Oleg Romantsev.

Transferred out during the season: Aleksandr Bubnov (to (France) Red Star), Vladimir Sochnov, Valeri Shikunov (both to RVShSM-RAF Jelgava).

2. FC Dnipro Dnipropetrovsk

Goalkeepers: Valeriy Horodov (21), Serhiy Krakovskyi (9).
Defenders: Andriy Sydelnykov (29 / 2), Oleksiy Cherednyk (24), Evgeny Yarovenko (20 / 2), Ivan Vyshnevskyi (16), Serhiy Puchkov (15 / 1), Volodymyr Gerashchenko (13), Oleksandr Sorokalet (10), Oleksandr Chervonyi (8), Yuriy Kulish (6), Petro Buts (1).
Midfielders: Volodymyr Bahmut (30 / 5), Mykola Kudrytsky (29 / 10), Volodymyr Lyutyi (29 / 7), Andriy Yudin (26 / 3), Vadym Tyshchenko (20 / 3), Anton Shokh (16), Marat Kabayev (1).
Forwards: Eduard Son (27 / 6), Yevhen Shakhov (25 / 8), Valentyn Moskvyn (8), Igor Shkvyrin (4).

Manager: Yevhen Kucherevskyi.

Transferred out during the season: Volodymyr Lyutyi (to (Germany) FC Schalke 04), Ivan Vyshnevskyi (to (Turkey) Fenerbahçe S.K.), Igor Shkvyrin, Marat Kabayev (both to FC Pakhtakor Tashkent).

3. FC Dynamo Kyiv

Goalkeepers: Viktor Chanov (22), Aleksandr Zhidkov (10).
Defenders: Oleh Kuznetsov (29 / 4), Oleh Luzhnyi (27), Serhiy Shmatovalenko (26), Serhiy Zayets (22 / 4), Andriy Bal (18), Volodymyr Bezsonov (17 / 5), Vladimir Gorilyi (17), Anatoliy Demyanenko (5 / 2), Albert Sarkisyan (3).
Midfielders: Hennadiy Lytovchenko (29 / 7), Ivan Yaremchuk (18 / 1), Oleksiy Mykhaylychenko (15 / 3), Andrei Kanchelskis (15), Vasyl Rats (13 / 3), Mykhaylo Stelmakh (11 / 1), Pavlo Yakovenko (10).
Forwards: Oleh Protasov (26 / 7), Oleg Salenko (26 / 3), Ihor Belanov (18 / 3).

One own goal scored by Aleksei Arifullin (FC Lokomotiv Moscow).

Manager: Valeriy Lobanovskyi.

Transferred out during the season: Ihor Belanov (to (Germany) Borussia Mönchengladbach).

== Number of teams by union republic ==
Rank	Union republic	Number of teams	Club(s)
1	RSFSR	6	Dinamo Moscow, Lokomotiv Moscow, Rotor Volgograd, Spartak Moscow, Torpedo Moscow, Zenit Leningrad
2	Ukrainian SSR	5	Chornomorets Odesa, Dynamo Kyiv, Dnipro Dnipropetrovsk, Metalist Kharkiv, Shakhtar Donetsk
3	Armenian SSR	1	Ararat Yerevan
3	Belarusian SSR	1	Dinamo Minsk
3	Georgian SSR	1	Dinamo Tbilisi
3	Lithuanian SSR	1	Zhalgiris Vilnius
3	Tajik SSR	1	Pamir Dushanbe

== Attendances ==
No.	Club	Average
1	Dynamo Kyiv	37,607
2	Spartak Moscow	33,620
3	Rotor	29,733
4	Shakhtar Donetsk	22,833
5	Pamir	20,133
6	Dinamo Tbilisi	19,113
7	Chornomorets	18,700
8	Ararat	18,193
9	Dinamo Minsk	14,733
10	Metalist	14,540
11	Dynamo Moscow	13,813
12	Dnipro	13,767
13	Zenit	11,367
14	Žalgiris	10,307
15	Torpedo Moscow	5,747
16	Lokomotiv Moscow	4,540
