= 1980 in Soviet football =

Football in the Soviet Union
- Season: 1980

Men's football
- Top League: Dinamo Kiev
- First League: Tavriya Simferopol
- Second League: Spartak Kostroma (Finals 1); Traktor Pavlodar (Finals 2); SKA Kiev (Finals 3)
- Soviet Cup: Shakhter Donetsk

The 1980 Soviet football championship was the 49th seasons of competitive football in the Soviet Union. Dinamo Kiev won the Top League championship becoming the Soviet domestic champions for the ninth time.

== Honours ==
| Competition | | Winner | Runner-up |
|---|---|---|---|
| Top League | | Dinamo Kiev (9) | Spartak Moscow |
| First League | | Tavriya Simferopol (1) | Dnepr Dnepropetrovsk |
| Second League | Finals 1 | Spartak Kostroma | Rotor Volgograd |
| Second League | Finals 2 | Traktor Pavlodar | Dinamo Samarkand |
| Second League | Finals 3 | SKA Kiev | Khimik Grodno |
| Soviet Cup | | Shakhter Donetsk (3) | Dinamo Tbilisi |

Notes = Number in parentheses is the times that club has won that honour. * indicates new record for competition

== Soviet Union football championship ==
=== Top League ===
| Pos | Team | Pld | W | D | L | GF | GA | GD | Pts | Qualification or relegation |
|---|---|---|---|---|---|---|---|---|---|---|
| 1 | (Ukrainian Soviet Socialist Republic) Dynamo Kyiv (C) | 34 | 21 | 9 | 4 | 63 | 23 | +40 | 51 | Qualification for European Cup first round |
| 2 | (Russian Soviet Federative Socialist Republic) Spartak Moscow | 34 | 18 | 9 | 7 | 49 | 26 | +23 | 45 | Qualification for UEFA Cup first round |
| 3 | (Russian Soviet Federative Socialist Republic) Zenit Leningrad | 34 | 16 | 10 | 8 | 51 | 42 | +9 | 42 | Qualification for UEFA Cup first round |
| 4 | (Georgian Soviet Socialist Republic) Dinamo Tbilisi | 34 | 16 | 7 | 11 | 51 | 32 | +19 | 39 | Qualification for Cup Winners' Cup first round (Note: Dinamo Tbilisi qualified for the Cup Winners' Cup as defending champions.) |
| 5 | (Russian Soviet Federative Socialist Republic) CSKA Moscow | 34 | 13 | 12 | 9 | 36 | 32 | +4 | 36 (Note: 2 points deducted (10 draw limit)) | Qualification for UEFA Cup first round |
| 6 | (Ukrainian Soviet Socialist Republic) Shakhtar Donetsk | 34 | 13 | 9 | 12 | 45 | 40 | +5 | 35 | |
| 7 | (Ukrainian Soviet Socialist Republic) Chornomorets Odessa | 34 | 13 | 9 | 12 | 37 | 37 | 0 | 35 | |
| 8 | (Byelorussian Soviet Socialist Republic) Dinamo Minsk | 34 | 11 | 12 | 11 | 41 | 42 | −1 | 32 | |
| 9 | (Armenian Soviet Socialist Republic) Ararat Yerevan | 34 | 11 | 11 | 12 | 39 | 43 | −4 | 32 (Note: 1 point deducted (10 draw limit)) | |
| 10 | (Russian Soviet Federative Socialist Republic) SKA Rostov-on-Don | 34 | 11 | 10 | 13 | 41 | 47 | −6 | 32 | Qualification for Cup Winners' Cup first round |
| 11 | (Russian Soviet Federative Socialist Republic) Torpedo Moscow | 34 | 10 | 11 | 13 | 28 | 32 | −4 | 30 | |
| 12 | (Kazakh Soviet Socialist Republic) Kairat Alma-Ata | 34 | 10 | 11 | 13 | 33 | 44 | −11 | 30 | |
| 13 | (Azerbaijan Soviet Socialist Republic) Neftchi Baku | 34 | 10 | 9 | 15 | 29 | 41 | −12 | 29 | |
| 14 | (Russian Soviet Federative Socialist Republic) Dynamo Moscow | 34 | 9 | 14 | 11 | 32 | 33 | −1 | 28 (Note: 4 points deducted (10 draw limit)) | |
| 15 | (Russian Soviet Federative Socialist Republic) Kuban Krasnodar | 34 | 9 | 10 | 15 | 32 | 43 | −11 | 28 | |
| 16 | (Uzbek Soviet Socialist Republic) Pakhtakor Tashkent | 34 | 9 | 8 | 17 | 26 | 43 | −17 | 26 | |
| 17 | (Ukrainian Soviet Socialist Republic) Karpaty Lviv (R) | 34 | 9 | 8 | 17 | 23 | 46 | −23 | 26 | Relegation to First League |
| 18 | (Russian Soviet Federative Socialist Republic) Lokomotiv Moscow (R) | 34 | 8 | 9 | 17 | 34 | 44 | −10 | 25 | Relegation to First League |

(C) Champions; (R) Relegated

=== First League ===
| Pos | Team | Pld | W | D | L | GF | GA | GD | Pts | Promotion or relegation |
|---|---|---|---|---|---|---|---|---|---|---|
| 1 | (Ukrainian Soviet Socialist Republic) Tavria Simferopol (C, P) | 46 | 28 | 9 | 9 | 82 | 42 | +40 | 65 | Promotion to Top League |
| 2 | (Ukrainian Soviet Socialist Republic) Dnipro Dnipropetrovsk (P) | 46 | 27 | 8 | 11 | 60 | 47 | +13 | 62 | Promotion to Top League |
| 3 | (Ukrainian Soviet Socialist Republic) Metalist Kharkiv | 46 | 24 | 12 | 10 | 76 | 40 | +36 | 60 | |
| 4 | (Tajik Soviet Socialist Republic) Pamir Dushanbe | 46 | 23 | 9 | 14 | 62 | 51 | +11 | 55 | |
| 5 | (Ukrainian Soviet Socialist Republic) Kolos Nikopol | 46 | 20 | 11 | 15 | 70 | 47 | +23 | 51 | |
| 6 | (Russian Soviet Federative Socialist Republic) SKA Khabarovsk | 46 | 20 | 10 | 16 | 45 | 60 | −15 | 50 | |
| 7 | (Russian Soviet Federative Socialist Republic) Dinamo Stavropol | 46 | 23 | 3 | 20 | 64 | 66 | −2 | 49 | |
| 8 | (Moldavian Soviet Socialist Republic) Nistru Kishinev | 46 | 20 | 8 | 18 | 60 | 55 | +5 | 48 | |
| 9 | (Russian Soviet Federative Socialist Republic) Iskra Smolensk | 46 | 18 | 11 | 17 | 50 | 46 | +4 | 47 | |
| 10 | (Ukrainian Soviet Socialist Republic) Zarya Voroshilovgrad | 46 | 19 | 8 | 19 | 68 | 60 | +8 | 46 | |
| 11 | (Georgian Soviet Socialist Republic) Guria Lanchkhuti | 46 | 18 | 10 | 18 | 68 | 73 | −5 | 46 | |
| 12 | (Russian Soviet Federative Socialist Republic) Fakel Voronezh | 46 | 17 | 16 | 13 | 49 | 36 | +13 | 46 (Note: There was a draw limit for the draws earned, 12. Only twelve draws earn a point, in contrast, over the limit draws earn no points.) | |
| 13 | (Georgian Soviet Socialist Republic) Torpedo Kutaisi | 46 | 18 | 9 | 19 | 62 | 54 | +8 | 45 | |
| 14 | (Russian Soviet Federative Socialist Republic) Kuzbass Kemerovo | 46 | 18 | 7 | 21 | 61 | 77 | −16 | 43 | |
| 15 | (Russian Soviet Federative Socialist Republic) Spartak Ordjonikidze | 46 | 17 | 9 | 20 | 43 | 50 | −7 | 43 | |
| 16 | (Ukrainian Soviet Socialist Republic) SKA Odessa | 46 | 16 | 10 | 20 | 52 | 47 | +5 | 42 | |
| 17 | (Ukrainian Soviet Socialist Republic) Spartak Ivano-Frankivsk | 46 | 16 | 10 | 20 | 54 | 67 | −13 | 42 | |
| 18 | (Lithuanian Soviet Socialist Republic) Žalgiris Vilnius | 46 | 15 | 14 | 17 | 50 | 39 | +11 | 42 | |
| 19 | (Uzbek Soviet Socialist Republic) Buston Dzhizak | 46 | 15 | 12 | 19 | 48 | 61 | −13 | 42 | |
| 20 | (Ukrainian Soviet Socialist Republic) Metallurg Zaporozhia | 46 | 15 | 11 | 20 | 57 | 67 | −10 | 41 | |
| 21 | (Russian Soviet Federative Socialist Republic) Shinnik Yaroslavl | 46 | 14 | 15 | 17 | 51 | 57 | −6 | 40 | |
| 22 | (Russian Soviet Federative Socialist Republic) Krylya Sovetov Kuibyshev (R) | 46 | 11 | 16 | 19 | 43 | 62 | −19 | 34 | Relegation to Second League |
| 23 | (Russian Soviet Federative Socialist Republic) Spartak Nalchik (R) | 46 | 8 | 15 | 23 | 35 | 59 | −24 | 28 | Relegation to Second League |
| 24 | (Russian Soviet Federative Socialist Republic) Uralmash Sverdlovsk (R) | 46 | 8 | 5 | 33 | 35 | 82 | −47 | 21 | Relegation to Second League |

Source: rsssf.com
(C) Champions; (P) Promoted; (R) Relegated

=== Second League (finals) ===
[Oct 26 – Nov 12]

=== Finals 1 ===
| Pos | Rep | Team | Pld | W | D | L | GF | GA | GD | Pts | Promotion |
|---|---|---|---|---|---|---|---|---|---|---|---|
| 1 | RUS | Spartak Kostroma | 4 | 2 | 1 | 1 | 4 | 7 | −3 | 5 | Promoted |
| 2 | RUS | Rotor Volgograd | 4 | 2 | 0 | 2 | 8 | 5 | +3 | 4 | |
| 3 | GEO | Lokomotiv Samtredia | 4 | 1 | 1 | 2 | 4 | 4 | 0 | 3 | |

=== Finals 2 ===
| Pos | Rep | Team | Pld | W | D | L | GF | GA | GD | Pts | Promotion |
|---|---|---|---|---|---|---|---|---|---|---|---|
| 1 | KAZ | Traktor Pavlodar | 4 | 2 | 1 | 1 | 5 | 2 | +3 | 5 | Promoted |
| 2 | UZB | Dinamo Samarkand | 4 | 2 | 1 | 1 | 7 | 4 | +3 | 5 | |
| 3 | RUS | Torpedo Togliatti | 4 | 1 | 0 | 3 | 3 | 9 | −6 | 2 | |

=== Finals 3 ===
| Pos | Rep | Team | Pld | W | D | L | GF | GA | GD | Pts | Promotion |
|---|---|---|---|---|---|---|---|---|---|---|---|
| 1 | UKR | SKA Kiev | 4 | 2 | 2 | 0 | 8 | 5 | +3 | 6 | Promoted |
| 2 | BLR | Khimik Grodno | 4 | 1 | 3 | 0 | 5 | 4 | +1 | 5 | |
| 3 | RUS | Dinamo Barnaul | 4 | 0 | 1 | 3 | 3 | 7 | −4 | 1 | |

Source: rsssf.com

=== Top goalscorers ===
Top League

- Sergei Andreyev (SKA Rostov-na-Donu) – 20 goals

First League

- Volodymyr Naumenko (Tavriya Simferopol) – 33 goals
