= Serhiy Kravchenko =

Serhiy Kravchenko may refer to:

- Serhiy Kravchenko (footballer, born 1956), Ukrainian footballer
- Serhiy Kravchenko (footballer, born 1983), Ukrainian footballer, graduate of Shakhtar football academy and footballer of FC Dnipro
- Serhiy Kravchenko (footballer, born 1990), Ukrainian footballer, graduate of the School of Olympic Reserve Donetsk and footballer of FC Helios Kharkiv
