= Soviet Super Cup =

Soviet football competition

- Founded: 1977 (introduced)
- Abolished: 1989
- Region: Soviet Union
- Teams: 2
- Last champions: Dnipro Dnipropetrovsk
- Most championships: Dynamo Kyiv (3 titles)

The Soviet Super Cup, (Note: Russian: Суперкубок СССР, romanized: Superkubok SSSR, Azerbaijani: Futbol üzrə SSRİ Superkuboku, Georgian: საბჭოთა კავშირის სუპერთასი, Lithuanian: TSRS Futbolo Supertaurė, Romanian: Supercupa URSS, Ukrainian: Суперкубок СРСР, romanized: Superkubok SRSR) also known as the Season's Cup, (Note: Russian: Кубок сезона, romanized: Kubok sezona, Ukrainian: Кубок сезону, romanized: Kubok sezonu) was an unofficial exhibition game (or game series) not sanctioned by the Football Federation of the Soviet Union and that featured the winners of the previous season's Soviet Top League and Soviet Cup in a one- or two-legged playoff for the trophy.

== History ==
The mini-tournament was conducted on the initiative of the Komsomolskaya Pravda editor's administration out of Moscow. The tournament was unofficial and never was part of the Football Federation of the Soviet Union. It was played seven times in the last 15 years of Soviet football. It was not until 1983 that the Super Cup was played every year. The Super Cup was made to take place during midseason and further complicated clubs' schedules.

In 1987, with Spartak Moscow winning league honors and Dynamo Kyiv winning the Soviet Cup, the Super Cup match was scheduled to take place in Chişinău, Moldova. However, the match never took place because of inadequate facilities in Chişinău. The last Soviet Super Cup took place in Sochi, Russia, where the match was played in front of 1,500 fans.

== Finals by year ==
1977 Season's Cup

20 November 1977

Dinamo Moscow	1–0	Dynamo Kyiv
Minayev 54'	Report

Lenin Dinamo Stadium, Tbilisi
Attendance: 35,000
Referee: Georgiy Bakanidze (Tbilisi)

1981 Season's Cup

10 March 1981

Dynamo Kyiv	1 – 1 5 – 4 (pen.) (a.e.t.)	Shaktar Donetsk
Boiko 41'	Report	Kravchenko 52'
Penalties
Yurchishin (penalty scored); Blokhin (penalty scored); Bessonov (penalty scored); Baltacha (penalty scored); Konkov (penalty scored)	5–4	(penalty scored) Sokolovsky; (penalty scored) Bondarenko; (penalty scored) Gorbunov; (penalty scored) Kravchenko; (penalty missed) Starukhin

Lokomotiv Stadium, Simferopol
Attendance: unknown
Referee: Aleksandr Mushkovets (Moscow)

1984 Season's Cup, consisted of two games

5 July 1984

Shakhtar Donetsk	2–1	Dnipro Dnipropetrovsk
Vyshnevsky 54' (o.g.); Morozov 54'	Report	Litovchenko 40'

Shakhtar Stadium, Donetsk
Attendance: 32,840
Referee: Valeri Butenko (Moscow)
8 July 1984

Dnipro Dnipropetrovsk	1–1	Shakhtar Donetsk
Fedorenko 70'	Report	Sokolovsky 89'

Meteor Stadium, Dnipropetrovsk
Attendance: 29,500
Referee: Vladimir Kuznetsov (Omsk)

Shakhtar won the Cup play-off 3–2

1985 Season's Cup, consisted of two games

30 July 1985

Zenit Leningrad	2–1	Dinamo Moscow
Pozdnyakov 33' (o.g.); Gerasimov 71'	Report	Ataulin 5'

Kirov Stadium, Leningrad
Attendance: 31,000
Referee: Velodi Miminoshvili (Tbilisi)
5 August 1985

Dinamo Moscow	0–1	Zenit Leningrad
	Report	Melnikov 20'

Dynamo Stadium, Moscow
Attendance: 12,200
Referee: Myroslav Stupar (Ivano-Frankivsk)

Zenit won the Cup play-off 3-1

1986 Soviet Super Cup

11 April 1986

Dynamo Kyiv	2–2 (a.e.t.)	Shakhtar Donetsk
Shcherbakov 73'; Yevtushenko 118'	Report	Sokolovsky 54'; Kravchenko 117'
Penalties
Demyanenko (penalty scored); Baltacha (penalty scored); Yevtushenko (penalty scored); Yakovenko (penalty missed)	3–1	(penalty scored) Morozov; (penalty missed) Varnavsky; (penalty missed) Kravchenko; (penalty missed) Grachev

Republican Stadium, Kyiv
Attendance: 65,300
Referee: Aleksei Spirin (Moscow)

1987 Soviet Super Cup

18 May 1987

Torpedo Moscow	1–1 (a.e.t.)	Dynamo Kyiv
Shirinbekov 47'	Report	Belanov 81'
Penalties
Kharine (penalty scored); Polukarov (penalty scored); Kobzev (penalty scored); Shirinbekov (penalty missed); Agashkov (penalty scored)	4–5	(penalty scored) Belanov; (penalty scored) Demyanenko; (penalty scored) Baltacha; (penalty scored) Blokhin; (penalty scored) Bessonov

Central Lenin Stadium, Moscow
Attendance: 30,000
Referee: Ivan Timoshenko (Rostov-on-Don)

1988 Soviet Super Cup

1 March 1988

Spartak Moscow	suspended	Dynamo Kyiv

Republican Stadium, Chișinău

1989 Soviet Super Cup

1 March 1989

Dnipro Dnipropetrovsk	3–1 (a.e.t.)	Metallist Kharkov
Shakhov 64' (pen.); Son 97'; Lyuty 103'	Report	Adzhoyev 62'

Central Stadium, Sochi
Attendance: 1,500
Referee: Aleksandr Kirillov (Moscow)

== Winners by year ==
Year	Location	Winner	Score	Runner-up
1977	Tbilisi, Georgia	(Russian Soviet Federative Socialist Republic) Dynamo Moscow (qualified as cup winner)	1 – 0	(Ukrainian Soviet Socialist Republic) Dynamo Kyiv (qualified as league winner)
1981	Simferopol, Ukraine	(Ukrainian Soviet Socialist Republic) Dynamo Kyiv (qualified as league winner)	1 – 1 (aet); 5 – 4 (penalties)	(Ukrainian Soviet Socialist Republic) Shakhtar Donetsk (qualified as cup winner)
1984	Leg 1: Donetsk, Ukraine; Leg 2: Dnipropetrovsk, Ukraine	(Ukrainian Soviet Socialist Republic) Shakhtar Donetsk (qualified as cup winner)	Leg 1: 2 – 1 Leg 2: 1 – 1	(Ukrainian Soviet Socialist Republic) Dnipro Dnipropetrovsk (qualified as league winner)
1985	Leg 1: Leningrad, Russia; Leg 2: Moscow, Russia	(Russian Soviet Federative Socialist Republic) Zenit Leningrad (qualified as league winner)	Leg 1: 2 – 1 Leg 2: 1 – 0	(Russian Soviet Federative Socialist Republic) Dynamo Moscow (qualified as cup winner)
1986	Kiev, Ukraine	(Ukrainian Soviet Socialist Republic) Dynamo Kyiv (qualified as league winner)	2 – 2 (aet); 3 – 1 (penalties)	(Ukrainian Soviet Socialist Republic) Shakhtar Donetsk (qualified as losing cup finalist)
1987	Moscow, Russia	(Ukrainian Soviet Socialist Republic) Dynamo Kyiv (qualified as league winner)	1 – 1 (aet); 5 – 4 (penalties)	(Russian Soviet Federative Socialist Republic) Torpedo Moscow (qualified as cup winner)
1988	Chișinău, Moldavia		ppd	
1989	Sochi, Russia	(Ukrainian Soviet Socialist Republic) Dnipro Dnipropetrovsk (qualified as league winner)	3 – 1 (aet)	(Ukrainian Soviet Socialist Republic) Metalist Kharkiv (qualified as cup winner)

== Performance by club ==
Club	Republic	Winners	Runners-up	Years won
Dynamo Kyiv	UKR	3	1	1981, 1986, 1987
Shakhtar Donetsk	UKR	1	2	1984
Dnipro Dnipropetrovsk	UKR	1	1	1988
Dynamo Moscow	RUS	1	1	1977
Zenit Leningrad	RUS	1	0	1985
Metalist Kharkiv	UKR	0	1	
Torpedo Moscow	RUS	0	1	
Total		7	7	

== Performance by republic ==
Republic	Winners	Runners-up	Winning clubs
Ukrainian SSR	5	5	Dynamo Kyiv (3), Shakhtar Donetsk (1), Dnipro Dnipropetrovsk (1)
Russian SFSR	2	2	Dynamo Moscow (1), Zenit Leningrad (1)
Total	7	7	

== See also ==
National super cups of former Soviet republics:

- (Armenia) Armenian Supercup
- Azerbaijan Supercup
- (Belarus) Belarusian Super Cup
- (Estonia) Estonian Supercup
- (Georgia (country)) Georgian Super Cup
- Kazakhstan Super Cup
- (Latvia) Latvian Supercup
- (Lithuania) Lithuanian Supercup
- (Moldova) Moldovan Super Cup
- (Russia) Russian Super Cup
- (Ukraine) Ukrainian Super Cup
- Super Cup of Champions
