= Football Cup of the Russian SFSR =

Association football playoff republican competitions in Russian SFSR from 1973 to 1991

Football Cup of the Russian SFSR (Russian: Кубок РСФСР по футболу) was a playoff republican competitions in association football that were taken place in Russian SFSR in 1973–1991.

== Finals ==
Year	Venue	Host (Winner)	Score	Guest (Runner-up)
1973	8 September 1973 16:00 (MST); Pskov – Mashinostroitel Stadium; Attendance: 8,000	Vulkan Petropavlovsk-Kamchatskiy; Aleksandr Kashuba 75'	1 – 0 (0 – 0)	Mashinostroitel Pskov
1974	2 November 1974 ?:? (MST); Magnitogorsk – Central Stadium of Metallurgov imeni 50-letia Oktyabria; Attendance: 10,000	Metallurg Magnitogorsk; Yuriy Khudyakov (penalty missed); Oleg Ovechkin 77'; Vladimir Shelgunov 88'	2 – 1 (0 – 0)	Lokomotiv Kaluga; Vasiliy Miles 61'
1975	2 November 1975 ?:? (MST); Kalinin – Khimik Stadium; Attendance: 15,000	Volga Kalinin; Vladimir Selyanin 4' (pen.); Viktor Galkin 10'	2 – 1 (2 – 1)	Dinamo Barnaul; Sergei Grigorovich 21'
1976	31 October 1976 ?:? (MST); Blagoveschensk – Spartak Stadium; Attendance: 8,000	Amur Blagoveschensk; Rudolf Mkrtychev 99', 114' (pen.)	2 – 0 (a.e.t.) (0 – 0, 1 – 0, 1 – 0)	Trud Voronezh
1977	5 November 1977 16:00 (MST); Voronezh – Central Sportkombinat Profsoyuzov; Attendance: 5,000	Fakel Voronezh; Vladimir Proskurin 15'; Viktor Papayev 64'	2 – 1 (1 – 0)	Chkalovets Novosibirsk; Konstantin Grigoriev 89'
1980	16 November 1980 ?:? (MST); Sochi – Central Stadium; Attendance: 500	Torpedo Togliatti; Aleksandr Larionov, Anatoliy Novikov	3 – 2 (2 – 1)	Znamya Truda Orekhovo-Zuyevo; Vladimir Sochnov,
1981	8 August 1981 ?:? (MST); Omsk – Krasnaya Zvezda Stadium; Attendance: 15,000	Irtysh Omsk; Aleksandr Koryukov 43'; Mikhail Davydov; Sergei Koshurnikov; Viktor Sorvanov,	5 – 0 (1 – 0)	Lokomotiv Kaluga
1983	13 August 1983 ?:? (MST); Stavropol – Dynamo Stadium; Attendance: 14,500	Dinamo Stavropol	4 – 0 (2 – 0)	Geolog Tyumen
1984	4 August 1984 ?:? (MST); Tyumen – Geolog Stadium; Attendance: 10,000	Geolog Tyumen; Vasiliy Orlov 117'	1 – 0 (a.e.t.) (0 – 0, 0 – 0, 1 – 0)	Tekstilschik Ivanovo
1985	4 August 1985 ?:? (MST); Tyumen – Geolog Stadium; Attendance:	Geolog Tyumen	0 – 0 (0 – 0)	Krasnaya Presnya Moscow
1985	11 August 1985 ?:? (MST); Moscow – Torpedo Stadium; Attendance:	Krasnaya Presnya Moscow	2 – 0 (2 – 0)	Geolog Tyumen
1986	22 October 1986 ?:? (MST); Rubtsovsk – Torpedo Stadium; Attendance: 2,500	Torpedo Rubtsovsk	0 – 1 (0 – 0)	Tekstilschik Ivanovo
1986	26 October 1986 ?:? (MST); Ivanovo – Tekstilschik Stadium; Attendance: 5,000	Tekstilschik Ivanovo	5 – 1 (4 – 1)	Torpedo Rubtsovsk
1987	7 September 1987 ?:? (MST); Krasnogorsk – Zorkiy Stadium; Attendance: 2,500	Zorkiy Krasnogorsk	2 – 1 (0 – 0)	Zvezda Perm
1987	11 September 1987 ?:? (MST); Perm – Central Stadium imeni Leninskogo komsomola Attendance: 11,928	Zvezda Perm	3 – 0 (1 – 0)	Zorkiy Krasnogorsk
1988	31 October – 8 November 1988; Maikop	Zenit Izhevsk	Final group (6 teams)	Spartak Nalchik; Zvezda Irkutsk
1989	14 November 1989 ?:? (MST); Volgograd – Central Stadium; Attendance: 1,000	Zvezda Gorodische	1 – 2 (1 – 1)	Okean Nakhodka
1989	19 November 1989 ?:? (MST); Nakhodka – Vodnik Stadium; Attendance: 6,000	Okean Nakhodka	4 – 2 (2 – 0)	Zvezda Gorodische
1990	2 October 1990 ?:? (MST); Neftekamsk – Torpedo Stadium; Attendance: 300	Bashselmash Neftekamsk	1 – 3 (1 – 2)	APK Azov
1990	4 November 1990 ?:? (MST); Azov – Donpresmash Stadium; Attendance: 3,700	APK Azov	2 – 0 (0 – 0)	Bashselmash Neftekamsk
1991	3 November 1991 ?:? (MST); Kurgan – Central Stadium; Attendance: 4,000	Sibir Kurgan	2 – 0 (0 – 0)	Kuban Baranikovskiy
1991	9 November 1991 ?:? (MST); Baranikovskiy – Kolos Stadium; Attendance: 3,000	Kuban Baranikovskiy	3 – 1 (a) (1 – 1)	Sibir Kurgan
