= Ivan Vishnevskiy =

Ivan Vishnevskiy may refer to:

- Ivan Vishnevskiy (ice hockey)
- Ivan Vishnevskiy (footballer)
