= 1981 Soviet Cup =

1981 Cup of USSR in Football
Кубок СССР

Tournament details
- Country: Soviet Union
- Dates: February 20 – May 9
- Teams: 48

Final positions
- Champions: SKA Rostov
- Runners-up: Spartak Moscow

The 1981 Soviet Cup was an association football cup competition of the Soviet Union. The winner of the competition, SKA Rostov qualified for the continental tournament.

== Participating teams ==
Enter in Grouped stage
1981 Vysshaya Liga; 16/18 teams	1981 Pervaya Liga; 24/24 teams	1981 Vtoraya Liga; 6/161 teams
✓ Dinamo Kiev; ✓ Dinamo Moscow; ✓ Torpedo Moscow; ✓ CSKA Moscow; ✓ Shakhter Donetsk; ✓ Dnepr Dnepropetrovsk; ✓ Dinamo Minsk; ✓ Neftchi Baku; ✓ Chernomorets Odessa; ✓ Kairat Alma-Ata; ✓ Kuban Krasnodar; ✓ Ararat Erevan; ✓ Zenit Leningrad; ✓ SKA Rostov-na-Donu; ✓ Tavria Simferopol; ✓ Pakhtakor Tashkent	✓ Metallist Kharkov; ✓ FC Torpedo Kutaisi; ✓ Lokomotiv Moscow; ✓ Shinnik Yaroslavl; ✓ Kolos Nikopol; ✓ Zalgiris Vilnius; ✓ Iskra Smolensk; ✓ Nistru Kishenev; ✓ Pamir Dushambe; ✓ Fakel Voronezh; ✓ Karpaty Lvov; ✓ Spartak Kostroma; ✓ Metallurg Zaporozhye; ✓ Guria Lanchkhuti; ✓ Zaria Voroshilovgrad; ✓ SKA Odessa; ✓ SKA Kiev; ✓ Buston Dzhizak; ✓ SKA Khabarovsk; ✓ Prikarpatie Ivano-Frankovsk; ✓ Spartak Ordzhonikidze; ✓ Kuzbass Kemerovo; ✓ Dinamo Stavropol; ✓ Traktor Pavlodar	✓ Khimik Grodno; ✓ Lokomotiv Samtredia; ✓ Torpedo Togliatti; ✓ Dinamo Samarkand; ✓ Dinamo Barnaul; ✓ Rotor Volgograd

Source: []

Notes

- Spartak Moscow and Dinamo Tbilisi received byes through the Round of 16.

== Competition schedule ==
=== Group stage ===
Games took place between February 20 – March 5, 1981.

==== Group 1 ====
[Uzhgorod, Mukachevo]
1.Dinamo Kiev                  5   4  1  0   9- 1   9  Qualified 
2.Kayrat Alma-Ata              5   3  0  2   8- 4   6  Qualified 
-----------------------------------------------------
3.Karpaty Lvov                 5   2  2  1   8- 4   6 
4.Prikarpatye Ivano-Frankovsk  5   1  3  1   1- 1   5 
5.Nistru Kishinev              5   1  2  2   3- 6   4 
6.Khimik Grodno                5   0  0  5   1-14   0

==== Group 2 ====
[Sochi, Adler]
1.Shakhtar Donetsk            4   3  1  0   6- 2   7  Qualified 
-----------------------------------------------------
2.Metallurg Zaporozhye         4   2  1  1   6- 2   5  
3.Kuzbass Kemerovo             4   2  1  1   2- 2   5 
4.Kuban Krasnodar              4   1  1  2   4- 5   3 
5.Lokomotiv Samtredia          4   0  0  4   0- 7   0

==== Group 3 ====
[Leningrad]
1.Zenit Leningrad              5   3  1  1  18- 9   7  Qualified 
2.Iskra Smolensk               5   3  1  1   9- 5   7  Qualified 
-----------------------------------------------------
3.Neftchi Baku                 5   2  2  1   9- 8   6 
4.Torpedo Kutaisi              5   1  3  1   5-11   5 
5.Zarya Voroshilovgrad         5   1  2  2   6- 7   4 
6.SKA Khabarovsk               5   0  1  4   3-10   1

==== Group 4 ====
[Kislovodsk, Lermontov]
1.Dinamo Minsk                 4   2  2  0   4- 1   6  Qualified 
-----------------------------------------------------
2.Spartak Orjonikidze          4   1  3  0   4- 2   5  
3. Guria Lanchkhuti             4   0  4  0   4- 4   4 
4.Dinamo Stavropol             4   0  3  1   2- 3   3 
5.Dnepr Dnepropetrovsk         4   0  2  2   3- 7   2

==== Group 5 ====
[Moskva]
1.Dinamo Moskva                5   4  1  0   9- 2   9  Qualified 
2.CSKA Moskva                  5   4  0  1  13- 4   8  Qualified 
-----------------------------------------------------
3.Žalgiris Vilnius             5   3  1  1  10- 7   7 
4.Shinnik Yaroslavl            5   2  0  3   7- 6   4 
5.Torpedo Togliatti            5   1  0  4   4-12   2 
6.SKA Kiev                     5   0  0  5   1-13   0

==== Group 6 ====
[Dushanbe, Nurek, Kurgan-Tyube]
1.Pamir Dushanbe               5   4  1  0   8- 1   9  Qualified 
2.SKA Rostov-na-Donu           5   3  0  2   4- 4   6  Qualified 
-----------------------------------------------------
3.Pahtakor Tashkent            5   2  2  1   3- 2   6 
4.Dinamo Samarkand             5   1  2  2   4- 6   4 
5.Buston Jizak                 5   1  1  3   2- 5   3 
6.Traktor Pavlodar             5   1  0  4   4- 7   2

==== Group 7 ====
[Sevastopol, Yalta]
1.Chernomorets Odessa          5   4  0  1  10- 5   8  Qualified
2.Lokomotiv Moskva             5   3  1  1   9- 5   7  Qualified  
-----------------------------------------------------
3.Tavria Simferopol            5   3  0  2   8- 5   6 
4.Kolos Nikopol                5   3  0  2   9- 7   6 
5.Fakel Voronezh               5   1  1  3   5- 9   3 
6.Dinamo Barnaul               5   0  0  5   4-14   0

==== Group 8 ====
[Yerevan, Oktemberyan]
1.Metallist Kharkov            5   4  0  1   8- 2   8  Qualified 
2.Ararat Yerevan               5   3  1  1   9- 5   7  Qualified 
-----------------------------------------------------
3.SKA Odessa                   5   3  0  2   6- 6   6 
4.Torpedo Moskva               5   2  1  2   6- 5   5 
5.Spartak Kostroma             5   1  0  4   1- 5   2 
6.Rotor Volgograd              5   1  0  4   4-11   2

=== Play-off stage ===
==== Round of 16 ====
[Mar 12] 
ARARAT Yerevan          2-1  Dinamo Tbilisi      [aet] 
  [Andranik Khachatryan 2, Ashot Saakyan 95 – Ramaz Shengelia 22. Att: 37,000] 
CHERNOMORETS Odessa     1-0  CSKA Moskva 
  [Vasiliy Ishchak 39. Att: 18,000] 
DINAMO Kiev             3-0  Kayrat Alma-Ata     [in Uzhgorod] 
  [Vladimir Bessonov 17, Oleg Blokhin 37 pen, Alexandr Kokorev (K) 80 og. Att: 5,500] 
DINAMO Minsk            1-0  Pamir Dushanbe      [in Leningrad] 
  [Yuriy Kurnenin 24 pen. Att: 2,000] 
SKA Rostov-na-Donu      3-1  Iskra Smolensk 
  [Alexandr Vorobyov 53, Alexandr Zavarov 57, Viktor Kuznetsov 64 – 
   Vladimir Nikonov 7. Att: 10,000] 
SPARTAK Moskva          1-0  Shakhtyor Donetsk 
  [Sergei Shvetsov 61. Att: 25,000] 
Zenit Leningrad         0-2  DINAMO Moskva 
  [Alexandr Minayev 62, Nikolai Latysh 64] 
[Mar 13] 
Lokomotiv Moskva        2-2  METALLIST Kharkov   [pen 0-3] 
  [Vladimir Mukhanov 20, Yevgeniy Drozzhin 107 – Stanislav Bernikov 79, 
   Vladimir Linke 93. Att: 5,000]

==== Quarterfinals ====
[Mar 21] 
DINAMO Moskva           1-1  Chernomorets Odessa  [pen 4-2] 
  [Nikolai Latysh 48 – Vladimir Ustimchik 41. Att: 10,000] 
METALLIST Kharkov       1-0  Dinamo Minsk         [aet] 
  [Stanislav Bernikov 94. Att: 36,000] 
SKA Rostov-na-Donu      2-1  Ararat Yerevan       [aet] 
  [Viktor Kuznetsov 80, Igor Gamula 104 – Samvel Kasaboglyan 84. Att: 25,000] 
[Mar 22] 
SPARTAK Moskva          3-0  Dinamo Kiev 
  [Fyodor Cherenkov 22, Yevgeniy Sidorov 28, 36. Att: 35,000]

==== Semifinals ====
All games played on April 27
Dinamo Moskva           0-1  SKA Rostov-na-Donu 
  [Igor Gamula 8. Att: 5,200] 
Metallist Kharkov       0-0  SPARTAK Moskva      [pen 2-4] 
  [Att: 37,000]

==== Final ====
9 May 1981

Spartak Moscow	0 – 1	SKA Rostov-on-Don
	Report	Andreyev 84'

Lenin's Central Stadium, Moscow
Attendance: 81,250
Referee: Myroslav Stupar (Stanislav)
