= Andriy Kravchenko =

Ukrainian racecar driver (born 1980)

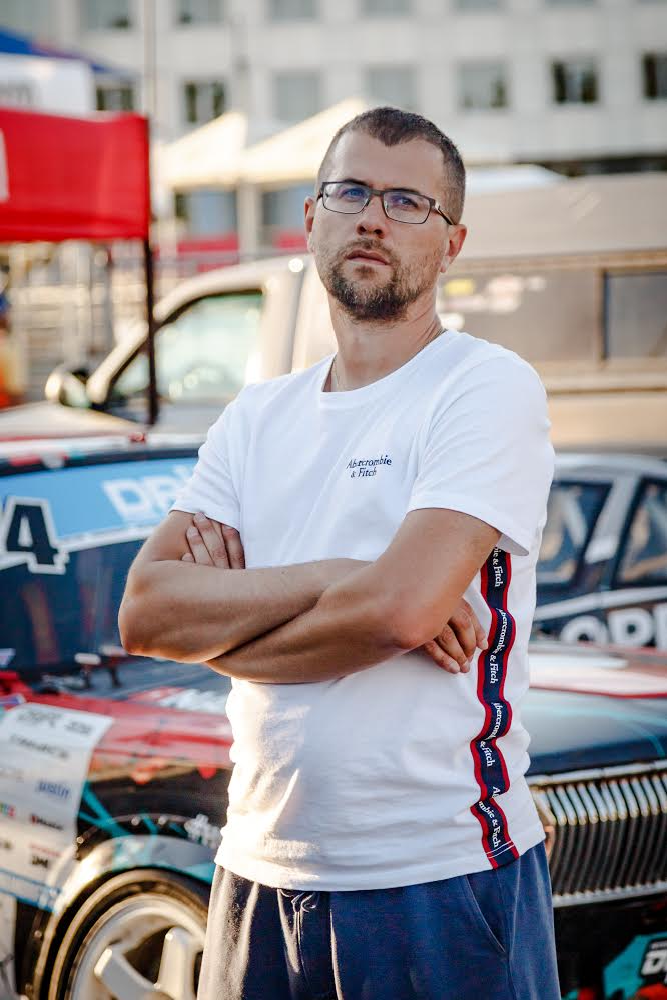

Personal information
- Full name: Andriy Serhiyovych Kravchenko
- Born: 3 December 1980 (age 45) Donetsk, Ukrainian SSR, USSR
- Occupation(s): Racecar driver, programmer, entrepreneur

Andriy Kravchenko (Ukrainian: Андрій Сергійович Кравченко; born 3 December 1980) is a Ukrainian racecar driver, international record holder acting in the drag racing. Multiple winner of the Ukrainian Championship in drag. He is the first in CIS who drove 1/4 mile faster than 8 sec and soon faster than 7 sec.

== Racing achievements ==
Andriy has been involved in motor racing since the age of 21 when he was still driving a Skoda Octavia. Then he got a Subaru Impreza WRX and he began to participate in professional races. He also had other sports cars, some of them he tuned up to 1000 hp and more. Now he has RWD ProMod PM100 output more than 3600 hp. Now he performs in his own team called TopSpeed. He holds second place in Europe among all-wheel drive cars with a time of 7.437 seconds that he set on a modified Nissan Skyline R32 in England on the SantaPod dragstrip. In 2014, in the RDRC championship, he took the 1st place at the 4th stage in Grodno and the 1st place at the 5th stage in Yevpatoria, in the same championship in 2015, he took the 1st place at the 5th stage in Grozny. Currently, Andriy stands for his team TopSpeed on the Topspeed Promod Outlaw car on which he set his personal record as well as the CIS record having driven 402 meters in 6.115 seconds.

== Short biography ==
He was born on December 3, 1980, in Donetsk in the family of football player Serhiy Kravchenko and was the eldest son in the family, Kravchenko's younger brother, Serhiy followed in his father's footsteps and became a famous football player who played in Dynamo Kyiv, Vorskla and Dnipro. In the period from 1997 to 2002, Andriy studied at the American University Vincennes University at the Faculty of Computer Programming, where he began his career as a programmer creating websites for Russian users. Also returning to his homeland, Andriy received his education at Taras Shevchenko National University of Kyiv at the law and economics department. Currently lives in Kyiv.

== Career ==
The first work of Andriy Kravchenko was the development of entertainment websites for Russians even during his studies, he created quite successful websites that ranked the top-3 in runet in their categories. After that, he worked in Mail.ru as a top-manager.

On October 21, 2005, he founded the company TopSpeed which sells parts for car tuning and adjusts racing and sport cars. Participation in the life of motor racing helps Andrew understand what is needed to sell on the market of automobile tuning. In the same year, he founded a sports team also called TopSpeed to participate in drag racing. The company is still working, developing and continue to be the most popular in Eastern Europe thanks to the sports team and its results.
