= Mykhaylo Mykhaylov =

Ukrainian footballer and football coach

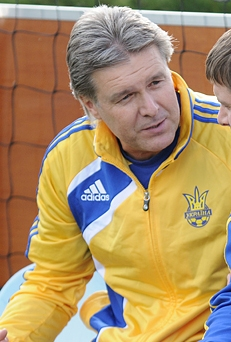

Personal information
- Full name: Mykhaylo Leonidovych Mykhaylov
- Date of birth: 6 July 1959 (age 67)
- Place of birth: Kirovohrad, Ukrainian SSR
- Height: 1.85 m (6 ft 1 in)
- Position: Goalkeeper

Team information
- Current team: (goalkeeping coach)

Senior career*
Years	Team	Apps	(Gls)
1977–1978	Zirka Kirovohrad	23	(0)
1979–1980	Dnipro Dnipropetrovsk	41	(0)
1980–1987	Dynamo Kyiv	101	(0)
1988	Neftçi Baku	24	(0)
1989	Shakhtar Donetsk	27	(0)
1990	Dynamo Kyiv	0	(0)
1991–1992	Apollon Smyrni	28	(0)
Total		243	(0)

Managerial career
- 1993–2006: Dynamo Kyiv (goalkeeping coach)
- 2007–2009: Ukraine (goalkeeping coach)
- 2009–2025: Dynamo Kyiv (goalkeeping coach)
- * Club domestic league appearances and goals

Mykhaylo Leonidovych Mykhaylov (born 6 July 1959) is a Ukrainian professional football coach and a former player.

== Honours ==
- European Cup Winners' Cup: 1985–86.
- Soviet Top League: 1980, 1981, 1985, 1986.
- Soviet Cup: 1982, 1987.
- Soviet Super Cup: 1981, 1986.
