= Viktor Chanov =

Ukrainian footballer (1959–2017)

Viktor Chanov Віктор Чанов

Personal information
- Full name: Viktor Viktorovych Chanov; Віктор Вікторович Чанов
- Date of birth: 21 July 1959
- Place of birth: Stalino, Ukrainian SSR, Soviet Union
- Date of death: 8 February 2017 (aged 57)
- Place of death: Kyiv, Ukraine
- Height: 1.84 m (6 ft 0 in)
- Position: Goalkeeper

Senior career*
Years	Team	Apps	(Gls)
1978–1981	Shakhtar Donetsk	62	(0)
1982–1990	Dynamo Kyiv	202	(0)
1990–1993	Maccabi Haifa	78	(0)
1993–1994	→ Bnei Yehuda (loan)	28	(0)
1994–1995	CSKA-Borysfen Kyiv	10	(0)
Total		380	(0)

International career
1982–1990	USSR	21	(0)

Managerial career
- 1995–1996: CSKA-Borysfen (assistant)
- 1996: CSKA-Borysfen
- 2006–2007: Dynamo Kyiv (assistant)
Medal record
Men's football
Representing Soviet Union
FIFA U-20 World Cup
Runner-up	1979 Japan
UEFA European Under-18 Championship
Winner	1978 Poland
UEFA European U-18 Championships
Bronze medal – third place	1977 Belgium
UEFA European Under-21 Championship
Winner	1980 Europe
- * Club domestic league appearances and goals

Viktor Viktorovych Chanov (Ukrainian: Віктор Вікторович Чанов; 21 July 1959 – 8 February 2017) was a Soviet and Ukrainian footballer who played as a goalkeeper. Throughout the 1980s in the former USSR, Chanov played mainly for Dynamo Kyiv.

== Club career ==
Chanov was born in Stalino, Ukrainian SSR, Soviet Union. He joined the local club Shakhtar Donetsk at an early age, along with his brother Vyacheslav, also a goalkeeper. During the late 1970s to early 1980s Chanov performed exceptionally well and attracted the attention of the great Dynamo Kyiv. He transferred to Dynamo to compete for the number 1 jersey with Mykhaylo Mykhaylov, another goalkeeper of massive potential.

Initially, Chanov ousted Mikhailov and forced his way also into the USSR squad for the 1982 FIFA World Cup in Spain, as second choice behind Rinat Dasaev. Chanov won league titles in his first two seasons at Dynamo and was the first-choice keeper throughout, however injury forced him out of some games in early 1985, and Mikhailov regained his position. Chanov returned to fitness midway through the season but was unable to dislodge Mikhailov, whose form had persuaded Valery Lobanovsky to persist with him. Dynamo Kyiv won the cup that year and Mikhailov was instrumental in the success.

In 1986, Lobanovsky had decisions to make on the goalkeeping front. Chanov was selected as the first-choice goalkeeper and was in goal as Dynamo lifted the European Cup Winners Cup, defeating Atlético Madrid 3–0 in Lyon. He played with an injured hand in the final. Chanov played 202 games for Dynamo.

=== Israel ===
In 1990, Chanov played out his last season Dynamo Kyiv and moved to spend his remaining days in Israel with Maccabi Haifa. He was signed by then-manager Shlomo Sharf to take the place of Giora Antman, arriving in Israel two days after Antman gave up five goals in a 5–0 drubbing by Maccabi Netanya. Chanov was immediately successful in goal, breaking a club record of four clean sheets in his first four matches. He won a league and cup double in his first season and later added the Israeli cup.

== International career ==
In the summer of 1986 Chanov travelled to Mexico for the World Cup Finals with the USSR squad, again as back-up for Dasaev. He made a solitary appearance against Canada in a "dead rubber" match at the end of the first-round stage.

He was yet again a reserve for the USSR at Euro 1988 in West Germany, appearing once as a 69th-minute substitute against the Republic of Ireland after Dasaev was injured while making a challenge on Tony Galvin.

== Death ==
Chanov was murdered in February 2017. The identity of the killer remains unknown.

== Honours ==
Shakhtar Donetsk

- Soviet Cup: 1980

Dynamo Kyiv

- Soviet Top League: 1985, 1986, 1990
- Soviet Cup: 1985, 1986, 1990
- UEFA Cup Winners Cup: 1986

Maccabi Haifa

- Israeli Premier League: 1991
- Israeli Cup: 1991, 1993
