= Volodymyr Bezsonov =

Ukrainian footballer (born 1958)

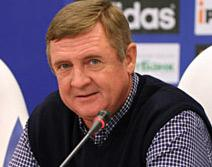
- Bezsonov in 2010

Personal information
- Full name: Volodymyr Vasylyovich Bezsonov
- Date of birth: 5 March 1958 (age 68)
- Place of birth: Kharkiv, Ukrainian SSR, Soviet Union
- Height: 1.80 m (5 ft 11 in)
- Position: Right-back

Senior career*
Years	Team	Apps	(Gls)
1976–1990	Dynamo Kyiv	277	(27)
1990–1991	Maccabi Haifa	5	(0)
Total		282	(27)

International career
1977–1990	Soviet Union	79	(4)
1980	Soviet Union Olympic	6	(1)

Managerial career
- 1997–2000: CSKA Kyiv
- 2001: CSKA Kyiv
- 2002–2003: Turkmenistan
- 2004–2005: Nyva Vinnytsia
- 2006: Zorya Luhansk
- 2006–2008: Kharkiv
- 2008–2010: Dnipro Dnipropetrovsk
Medal record
Representing Soviet Union
Men's Football
UEFA European Championship
Runner-up	1988 West Germany
Olympic Games
Bronze medal – third place	1980 Moscow
FIFA U-20 World Cup
Winner	1977 Tunisia
UEFA European U-18 Championships
Winner	1976 Hungary
- * Club domestic league appearances and goals

Volodymyr Vasylyovych Bezsonov (Ukrainian: Володимир Васильович Безсонов, also spelled Vladimir Vasilijević Bessonov from Russian: Владимир Васильевич Бессонов, born 5 March 1958) is a Ukrainian football manager and former player who played for the former Soviet Union national team. The most recent team he was managing was FC Dnipro in the Ukrainian Premier League.

== Club career ==
Bezsonov is a graduate student of the Kharkiv State College of Physical Culture 1 where he began his football career. In 1975 he joined Metalist Kharkiv, but only played for its reserve team.

In 1976 Bezsonov joined Dynamo Kyiv. There, he spent most of his career, except for a short one-season stint in Israeli club Maccabi Haifa in 1990–91. He was well known as a lightning quick full-back with a powerful shot. Bezsonov was attack-minded and scored a good return for a defender. He ended with 27 goals in the 377 games that he played for Dynamo.

== International career ==
Bezsonov won 79 caps and scored 4 goals for the Soviet Union national team from 1977 to 1990 and was included in three FIFA World Cup squads. He also holds the record for the fifth most appearances for the team. In the 1990 World Cup, he was sent off against Argentina. His team ended up losing the game 2–0 which eventually became his farewell match for the Soviet national team.

In 1979, Bezsonov played a couple of matches for the Ukrainian SSR at the Spartakiad of the Peoples of the USSR where Ukraine placed third.

In 1980, Bezsonov was on the Soviet squad for the 1980 Summer Olympics where the Soviet Union placed third.

== Managerial career ==
Most recently, Bezsonov was the head coach of FC Dnipro in the Ukrainian Premier League, but was sacked in September 2010 following the team's elimination from the UEFA Europa League and a number of poor results domestically.

== Personal life ==
Bezsonov is married to Viktoria Serykh, a former two-time world champion in rhythmic gymnastics. Together they have a daughter, Anna Bessonova, who also competed internationally in rhythmic gymnastics and became world champion in 2007, as well as winning an Olympic bronze in 2004 and 2008.

In February 2022, a photo of Bezsonov on the frontline during the Russian invasion of Ukraine was posted on social media by his daughter.

== Career statistics ==
=== Club ===
Appearances and goals by club, season and competition
Club	Season	League			Cup		Europe		Other		Total	
Club	Season	Division	Apps	Goals	Apps	Goals	Apps	Goals	Apps	Goals	Apps	Goals
Dynamo Kyiv	1976 (s)	Soviet Top League	9	0	–		–		–		9	0
Dynamo Kyiv	1976 (a)	Soviet Top League	2	0	–		–		–		2	0
Dynamo Kyiv	1977	Soviet Top League	16	1	1	0	2	0	1	0	20	1
Dynamo Kyiv	1978	Soviet Top League	23	3	8	2	4	0	–		35	5
Dynamo Kyiv	1979	Soviet Top League	24	2	4	0	5	1	–		33	3
Dynamo Kyiv	1980	Soviet Top League	34	5	6	2	2	0	–		42	7
Dynamo Kyiv	1981	Soviet Top League	25	2	7	2	5	1	1	0	38	5
Dynamo Kyiv	1982	Soviet Top League	18	4	–		3	1	–		21	5
Dynamo Kyiv	1983	Soviet Top League	11	1	1	0	–		–		12	1
Dynamo Kyiv	1984	Soviet Top League	20	2	6	1	–		–		26	3
Dynamo Kyiv	1985	Soviet Top League	25	0	2	0	7	0	–		34	0
Dynamo Kyiv	1986	Soviet Top League	16	1	3	0	5	0	1	0	25	1
Dynamo Kyiv	1987	Soviet Top League	11	0	2	0	2	0	1	0	16	0
Dynamo Kyiv	1988	Soviet Top League	19	0	2	0	–		–		21	0
Dynamo Kyiv	1989	Soviet Top League	17	5	4	1	4	2	–		25	8
Dynamo Kyiv	1990	Soviet Top League	7	1	1	0	–		–		8	1
Career total			277	27	47	8	39	5	4	0	367	40

- The statistics in USSR Cups and Europe is made under the scheme "autumn-spring" and enlisted in a year of start of tournaments

=== International ===
Appearances and goals by national team and year
National team	Year	Apps	Goals
Soviet Union	1977	4	0
Soviet Union	1978	10	2
Soviet Union	1979	5	0
Soviet Union	1980	8	1
Soviet Union	1981	4	0
Soviet Union	1982	7	0
Soviet Union	1983	5	0
Soviet Union	1984	3	0
Soviet Union	1985	2	0
Soviet Union	1986	11	0
Soviet Union	1987	4	0
Soviet Union	1988	9	0
Soviet Union	1989	3	0
Soviet Union	1990	4	1
Total		79	4

Scores and results list Soviet Union's goal tally first, score column indicates score after each Bezsonov goal.

List of international goals scored by Volodymyr Bezsonov
No.	Date	Venue	Opponent	Score	Result	Competition
1	20 September 1978	Hrazdan Stadium, Yerevan, Soviet Union	Greece		2–0	UEFA Euro 1980 qualifying
2	26 November 1978	Nagai Stadium, Osaka, Japan	Japan		3–0	Friendly
3	15 October 1980	Teddy Stadium, Jerusalem, Israel	Iceland		5–0	1982 WC qualification
4	24 February 1990	Stanford Stadium, Stanford, California, United States	United States		3–1	Friendly

== Honours ==
Dynamo Kyiv

- Soviet Top League: 1977, 1980, 1981, 1985, 1986, 1990
- Soviet Cup: 1978, 1982, 1984–85, 1986–87, 1989–90
- Soviet Super Cup: 1980, 1985, 1986; runner-up 1977
- UEFA Cup Winners' Cup: 1986
- UEFA Super Cup runner-up: 1986

Soviet Union

- Summer Olympics bronze: 1980
- UEFA Euro runner-up: 1988

Individual

- FIFA World Youth Championship Golden Ball: 1977
- The best 33 football players of the Soviet Union (11): No. 1 (1978-1982, 1985-1987, 1989); No. 2 (1977); No. 3 (1988)
- Ukrainian Footballer of the Year: 1989; second place: 1988; third place: 1986
- Voted in the Soviet Union's "All-time World Cup team" on planetworldcup.com above other great full-backs, such as Igor Netto and Vasiliy Rats.
