= Andranik Khachatryan =

Soviet footballer

Personal information
- Date of birth: 1956 (age 69–70)
- Positions: Striker; defender

Senior career*
Years	Team	Apps	(Gls)
1977–1984	FC Ararat Yerevan	169	(32)
1985	FC Kotayk Abovian	27	(4)
1988–1989	FC Lori Kirovakan	67	(0)
- * Club domestic league appearances and goals

Andranik Khachatryan (Russian: Андраник Хачатрян; born 1956) is a retired Soviet professional football player.
