= Valeri Shikunov =

Russian footballer

Personal information
- Full name: Valeri Ivanovich Shikunov
- Date of birth: 28 October 1968 (age 57)
- Place of birth: Moscow, Russia
- Height: 1.80 m (5 ft 11 in)
- Positions: Defender; midfielder

Youth career
- FC Spartak Moscow

Senior career*
Years	Team	Apps	(Gls)
1987–1989	FC Spartak Moscow	5	(0)
1989	RVShSM-RAF Jelgava	20	(1)
1990	PFC CSKA-2 Moscow	3	(0)
1990	PFC CSKA Moscow	0	(0)
1990–1991	FC SKA Rostov-on-Don	47	(5)
1991	PFC CSKA-2 Moscow	0	(0)
1992–1993	FC Asmaral Moscow	24	(1)
1994	FC Dynamo-d Moscow	40	(1)
1996	FC Chernomorets-d Novorossiysk	3	(0)
2001	FC Torgmash Lyubertsy (D4)		
- * Club domestic league appearances and goals

Valeri Ivanovich Shikunov (Russian: Валерий Иванович Шикунов; born 28 October 1968) is a former Russian professional football player.

== Club career ==
He played for the main squad of PFC CSKA Moscow in the USSR Federation Cup.

Shikunov scored one of the goals as FC Asmaral Moscow became the first club to score more than seven goals in a Russian Top League match, thrashing FC Zenit Saint Petersburg 8–3 during the 1992 season.

== Honours ==
- Soviet Top League champion: 1989.
- USSR Federation Cup winner: 1987.
