= Valeriy Horbunov =

Ukrainian and Soviet footballer

Personal information
- Full name: Valeriy Petrovych Horbunov
- Date of birth: 13 November 1953
- Place of birth: Horlivka, Ukrainian SSR
- Date of death: 1996 (aged 39–40)
- Position: Defender

Youth career
- Shakhtar Horlivka

Senior career*
Years	Team	Apps	(Gls)
1972–1982	Shakhtar Donetsk	222	(3)

International career
1978	Soviet Union	1	(0)
Medal record
Men's football
Representing Soviet Union
UEFA European Under-23 Championship
Winner	1976 Europe
- * Club domestic league appearances and goals

Valeriy Petrovych Horbunov (Ukrainian: Валерій Петрович Горбунов; 13 November 1953 – 1996) was a Ukrainian and Soviet football player.

== Honours ==
- Soviet Cup: 1980
- UEFA European Under-23 Football Championship: 1976

== International career ==
Horbunov played his only game for USSR on 6 September 1978 in a friendly against Iran.
