= Yuriy Romenskyi =

Soviet football player

Personal information
- Full name: Yuriy Mykhaylovych Romenskyi
- Date of birth: 1 August 1952 (age 74)
- Place of birth: Mingachevir, Azerbaijani SSR
- Height: 1.88 m (6 ft 2 in)
- Position: Goalkeeper

Team information
- Current team: Ukraine (goalkeeping coach)

Youth career
- Zvezdochka Mingachevir

Senior career*
Years	Team	Apps	(Gls)
1968–1970	Tekstilshchik Mingachevir		
1971–1977	Neftchi Baku PFC	84	(0)
1978	FC Chornomorets Odesa	26	(0)
1979–1981	FC Dynamo Kyiv	72	(0)
1982–1984	FC Chornomorets Odessa	62	(0)

International career
1978–1979	USSR	5	(0)
1979	Ukraine	?	(0)

Managerial career
- ?: FC Veres Rivne (consultant)
- 2003: FC Wil (goalkeeping coach)
- 2003–2007: Ukraine (goalkeeping coach)
- 2009–2011: FC Chornomorets Odesa (goalkeeping coach)
- 2011–2012: Ukraine (goalkeeping coach)
- * Club domestic league appearances and goals

Yuriy Mykhaylovych Romenskyi (Ukrainian: Юрій Михайлович Роменський; born 1 August 1952 in Mingachevir, Azerbaijani SSR) is a retired Soviet football player and a former FC Chornomorets Odesa goalkeeping coach.

Born in Azerbaijan Romensky settled in Ukraine since 1978 when he moved to Odessa after joining FC Chornomorets Odesa. He retired sometime in 1984 and then worked as a coach or football consultant. On the question "Who is the best Ukrainian goalkeeper?" he answered – "Yevhen Rudakov".

== Honours ==
- Soviet Top League winner: 1980, 1981.

== International career ==
Romensky made his debut for USSR on 19 November 1978 in a friendly against Japan. He played in a UEFA Euro 1980 qualifier (USSR did not qualify for the final tournament).

In 1979 Romensky played couple of games for Ukraine at the Spartakiad of the Peoples of the USSR.
