= Serhiy Kravchenko (footballer, born 1983) =

Ukrainian footballer

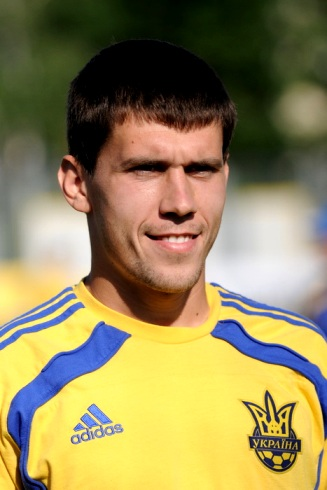
- Kravchenko with Ukraine in 2011

Personal information
- Full name: Serhiy Serhiyovych Kravchenko
- Date of birth: 24 April 1983 (age 43)
- Place of birth: Donetsk, Soviet Union (now Ukraine)
- Height: 1.81 m (5 ft 11 in)
- Position: Midfielder

Team information
- Current team: Polissya Zhytomyr (assistant)

Youth career
- –2002: Shakhtar Donetsk

Senior career*
Years	Team	Apps	(Gls)
2002–2003	Shakhtar-2 Donetsk	56	(4)
2002–2004	Shakhtar-3 Donetsk	39	(7)
2005	Qarabağ	12	(3)
2006–2008	Vorskla Poltava	80	(14)
2009	Dynamo Kyiv	12	(2)
2010–2017	Dnipro	117	(7)
2015–2016	→ Volyn Lutsk (loan)	24	(1)
2017–2020	Dnipro-1	74	(10)
2021–2022	Chornomorets Odesa	36	(2)
Total		450	(50)

International career
2008–2013	Ukraine	10	(1)

Managerial career
- 2023–2025: Oleksandriya (assistant)
- 2023: Ukraine U21 (assistant)
- 2023: Ukraine (assistant)
- 2024: Ukraine Olympic (assistant)
- 2025–: Polissya Zhytomyr (assistant)
- * Club domestic league appearances and goals as of 2 January 2023

Serhiy Serhiyovych Kravchenko (Ukrainian: Сергій Сергійович Кравченко; born 24 April 1983) is a Ukrainian retired professional football midfielder and current coach.

== Career ==
Kravchenko began his career in the Shakhtar Donetsk reserves and youth team in 2002.

=== Qarabağ ===
For the 2005–06 season, where he played for Qarabağ FK in the Azerbaijan Premier League. His club finished fifth at the end of the season.

=== Vorskla Poltava ===
Kravchenko moved to Vorskla Poltava in March 2006. There, when new coach Mykola Pavlov arrived in 2007, Kravchenko began to shine exceptionally.

In the 2007–08 season, the team finished 8th in the Ukrainian Premier League, which was its best result since the 1999–2000 season.

In the first half of the 2008–09 season, Vorksla made it the semifinals of the Ukrainian Cup which was their highest result in that competition ever. The team was also 4th in the league table. Kravchenko contributed scored 4 goals in 17 matches as well as several assists during this part of the season.

=== Dynamo Kyiv ===
On 28 July 2008, he officially signed with Ukrainian giants Dynamo Kyiv, but there is still questions when he will join them in the summer or in the winter when he becomes a free agent. Kravchenko will be entirely owned by the club on 28 January 2009, as reported by the Dynamo Kyiv official website.

=== Dnipro Dnipropetrovsk ===
On 23 December 2009 Kravchenko was sold to Dnipro for an undisclosed fee.

=== Volyn Lustk ===
On 6 July 2014 after his contract ran up with Dnipro Dnipropetrovsk, free agent Serhiy Kravchenko made a transfer to Ukrainian Premier League club Volyn Lutsk.

== International ==
Kravchenko has been a regular for the Ukraine national football team with head coach Oleksiy Mykhailychenko since teammate Oleh Husiev got injured. He was called with four other newcomers. He made the most of it when he scored the winning goal in a friendly against Poland.

== International goals ==
Scores and results list Ukraine's goal tally first.

#	Date	Venue	Opponent	Score	Result	Competition
1.	20 August 2008	Ukraina Stadium, Lviv	Poland	1–0	1–0	Friendly

== Personal life ==
Kravchenko is married to Tetiana. His father is Ukrainian football player and football coach Serhiy Kravchenko. His older brother is Ukrainian racecar driver – Andriy Kravchenko. He greatly admires French star Zinedine Zidane.

== Honors ==
UEFA Europa League runner-up (1) 2014–15
