= Vladimir Sochnov =

Soviet Russian footballer

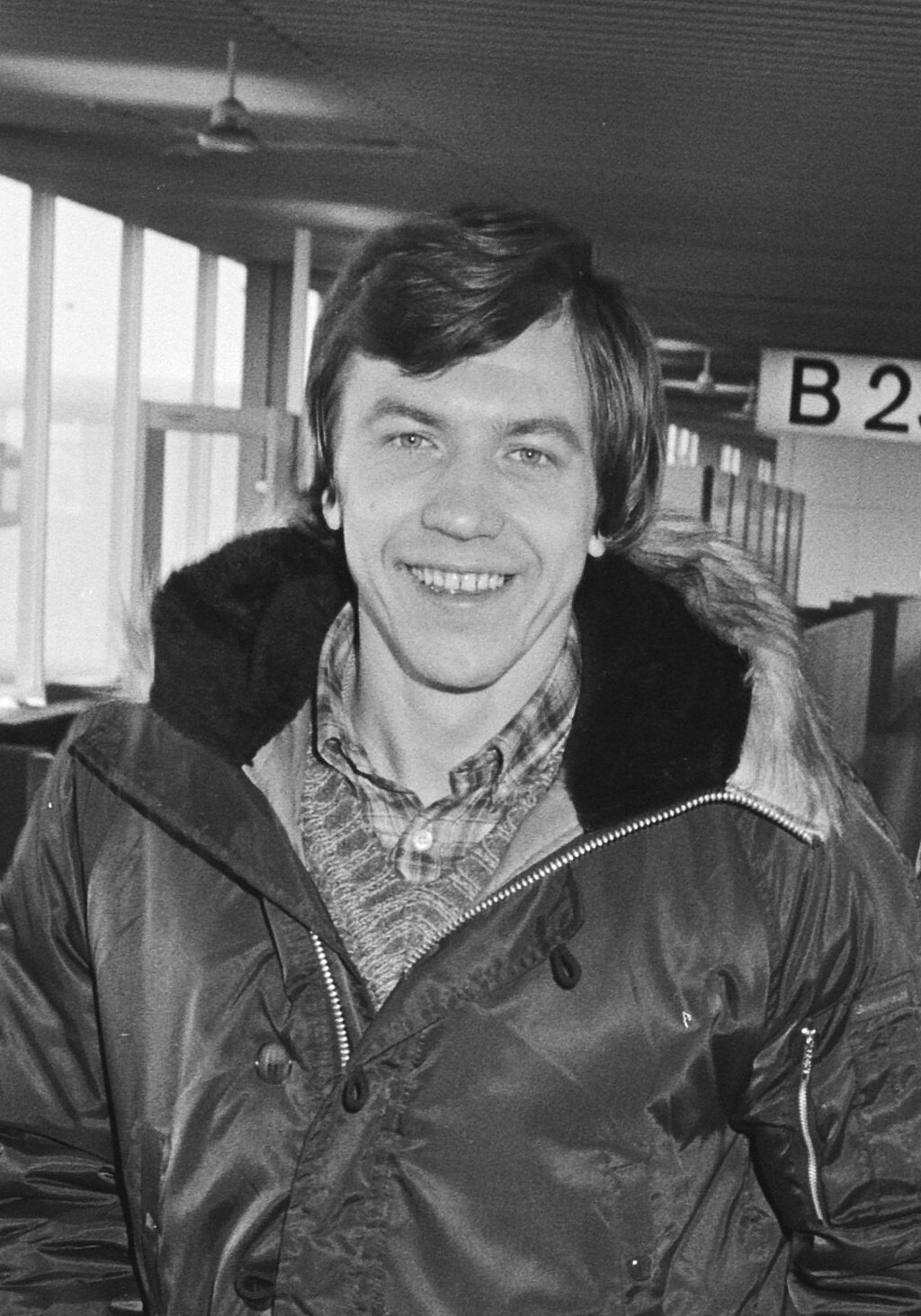

Personal information
- Full name: Vladimir Borisovich Sochnov
- Date of birth: 25 September 1955 (age 71)
- Place of birth: Moscow, Russian SFSR
- Height: 1.77 m (5 ft 9 1/2 in)
- Positions: Defender; midfielder

Senior career*
Years	Team	Apps	(Gls)
1980	FC Znamya Truda Orekhovo-Zuyevo		
1981–1985	FC Spartak Moscow	147	(9)
1986	FC Torpedo Moscow	17	(0)
1987	FC Krylia Sovetov Kuybyshev	27	(5)
1988	FC Znamya Truda Orekhovo-Zuyevo	7	(1)
1988–1989	FC Spartak Ordzhonikidze	29	(2)
1989	FC Spartak Moscow	1	(0)
1989	RVShSM-RAF Jelgava	6	(3)
1991	FC Asmaral Moscow	5	(0)
1995–1996	FC Moskabelmet Moscow		
- * Club domestic league appearances and goals

Vladimir Borisovich Sochnov (Russian: Владимир Борисович Сочнов; born 25 September 1955) is a former Soviet Russian professional football player.

== Honours ==
- Soviet Top League champion: 1989.
- Soviet Top League runner-up: 1981, 1983, 1984, 1985.
- Soviet Top League bronze: 1982.
- Soviet Cup winner: 1986.
