= Sergey Andreyev =

Russian footballer (born 1956)

Personal information
- Full name: Sergey Vasilyevich Andreyev
- Date of birth: 16 May 1956 (age 70)
- Place of birth: Luhansk, Ukrainian SSR, Soviet Union
- Height: 1.72 m (5 ft 8 in)
- Position: Forward

Senior career*
Years	Team	Apps	(Gls)
1973–1977	Zorya Luhansk	95	(13)
1978–1985	SKA Rostov	261	(167)
1986–1988	Rostselmash Rostov	100	(43)
1989–1990	Östers IF	43	(15)
1991–1993	Mjällby AIF	61	(17)
1993–1995	Rostselmash Rostov	57	(21)
Total		617	(276)

International career
1979–1983	Soviet Union	26	(8)

Managerial career
- 1995–2000: Rostselmash Rostov
- 2001: Chernomorets Novorossiysk
- 2002–2005: Salyut-Energia Belgorod
- 2006: SKA Rostov
- 2006–2007: FC Nika Krasny Sulin
- 2008: Atyrau
- 2014–2015: Vardar
- 2016: MITOS Novocherkassk
Medal record
Representing Soviet Union
Men's Football
Bronze medal – third place	1980 Moscow	Team competition
|}
- * Club domestic league appearances and goals

Sergey Vasilyevich Andreyev (Russian: Сергей Васильевич Андреев; born 16 May 1956) is a football manager and a former Soviet and Russian player.

== International career ==
Andreyev earned 26 caps and scored 8 goals for the USSR national team, and participated in the 1982 FIFA World Cup. He also won a bronze medal in football at the 1980 Summer Olympics, scoring a hat-trick against Cuba.

== Honours ==
Soviet Union

- Olympic bronze: 1980
- Olympic tournament top scorer: 1980, 5 goals

SKA Rostov

- Soviet Cup: 1981

Individual

- Soviet Top League top scorer: 1980 (20 goals), 1984 (19 goals)
- Top 33 players year-end list: four times
- Grigory Fedotov club member
