= 1980 Soviet Cup =

1980 Cup of USSR in Football
Кубок СССР

Tournament details
- Country: Soviet Union
- Dates: February 25 – August 9
- Teams: 48

Final positions
- Champions: Shakhtar Donetsk
- Runners-up: Dinamo Tbilisi

The 1980 Soviet Cup was an association football cup competition of the Soviet Union. The winner of the competition, Shakhter Donetsk qualified for the continental tournament.

== Participating teams ==
Enter in Grouped stage
| 1980 Vysshaya Liga; 17/18 teams | 1980 Pervaya Liga; 24/24 teams | 1980 Vtoraya Liga; 6/154 teams |
| ✓ Dinamo Kiev; ✓ Spartak Moscow; ✓ Zenit Leningrad; ✓ Dinamo Tbilisi; ✓ CSKA Moscow; ✓ Shakhter Donetsk; ✓ Chernomorets Odessa; ✓ Ararat Erevan; ✓ SKA Rostov-na-Donu; ✓ Dinamo Minsk; ✓ Torpedo Moscow; ✓ Kairat Alma-Ata; ✓ Neftchi Baku; ✓ Kuban Krasnodar; ✓ Pakhtakor Tashkent; ✓ Karpaty Lvov; ✓ Lokomotiv Moscow | ✓ Tavria Simferopol; ✓ Dnepr Dnepropetrovsk; ✓ Metallist Kharkov; ✓ Pamir Dushambe; ✓ Kolos Nikopol; ✓ SKA Khabarovsk; ✓ Dinamo Stavropol; ✓ Nistru Kishenev; ✓ Iskra Smolensk; ✓ Zaria Voroshilovgrad; ✓ Guria Lanchkhuti; ✓ Fakel Voronezh; ✓ FC Torpedo Kutaisi; ✓ Kuzbass Kemerovo; ✓ Spartak Ordzhonikidze; ✓ SKA Odessa; ✓ Prikarpatie Ivano-Frankovsk; ✓ Zalgiris Vilnius; ✓ Buston Dzhizak; ✓ Metallurg Zaporozhye; ✓ Shinnik Yaroslavl; ✓ Krylia Sovetov Kuibyshev; ✓ Spartak Nalchik; ✓ Uralmash Sverdlovsk | ✓ Terek Grozny; ✓ Zvezda Perm; ✓ Traktor Pavlodar; ✓ Dinamo Leningrad; ✓ Kolhozchi Ashkhabad; ✓ Alga Frunze |

Source: []

Notes

- Dinamo Moscow received bye through the Round of 16.

== Competition schedule ==
=== Group stage ===
Games took place between February 25 – March 12, 1980.

==== Group 1 ====
[Sochi, Adler]
1.Fakel Voronezh            5   2  2  1   5- 3   6  Qualified 
2.Spartak Moskva            5   2  2  1   5- 4   6  Qualified 
--------------------------------------------------
3.Metallist Kharkov         5   1  4  0   2- 1   6 
4.Zenit Leningrad           5   1  3  1   5- 3   5 
5.Kuban Krasnodar           5   1  2  2   4- 5   4 
6.Krylya Sovetov Kuibyshev  5   1  1  3   1- 6   3

==== Group 2 ====
[Samarkand]
1.Shakhtyor Donetsk         5   5  0  0   9- 2  10  Qualified 
2.Tavria Simferopol         5   3  1  1  11- 6   7  Qualified 
--------------------------------------------------
3.Chernomorets Odessa       5   1  3  1   5- 6   5 
4.Zarya Voroshilovgrad      5   1  2  2   6- 8   4 
5.Spartak Nalchik           5   1  2  2   3- 5   4 
6.Kuzbass Kemerovo          5   0  0  5   3-10   0

==== Group 3 ====
[Uzhgorod]
1.Dinamo Kiev               5   5  0  0  13- 1  10  Qualified 
2.Nistru Kishinev           5   3  1  1  13-10   7  Qualified 
--------------------------------------------------
3.Karpaty Lvov              5   3  0  2   8- 6   6 
4.Lokomotiv Moskva          5   1  1  3   3- 8   3 
5.Dnepr Dnepropetrovsk      5   1  0  4   3- 9   2 
6.Spartak Ivano-Frankovsk   5   0  2  3   2- 8   2

==== Group 4 ====
[Tbilisi, Rustavi]
1.Dinamo Tbilisi            5   5  0  0  13- 4  10  Qualified 
2.Kayrat Alma-Ata           5   4  0  1   8- 2   8  Qualified 
--------------------------------------------------
3.Torpedo Kutaisi           5   2  0  3   6- 8   4 
4.Spartak Orjonikidze       5   1  1  3   2- 4   3 
5.SKA Khabarovsk            5   1  1  3   3- 8   3 
6.SKA Odessa                5   1  0  4   2- 8   2

==== Group 5 ====
[Baku, Sumgait]
1.Neftchi Baku              5   5  0  0  13- 2  10  Qualified 
2.Dinamo Minsk              5   3  1  1  10- 1   7  Qualified 
--------------------------------------------------
3.Žalgiris Vilnius          5   2  1  2   7- 6   5 
4.Zvezda Perm               5   1  3  1   2- 2   5 
5.Dinamo Leningrad          5   0  2  3   1- 8   2 
6.Terek Grozny              5   0  1  4   0-14   1

==== Group 6 ====
[Yerevan]
1.Ararat Yerevan            5   4  1  0   9- 3   9  Qualified 
2.Torpedo Moskva            5   3  1  1   4- 3   7  Qualified 
--------------------------------------------------
3.Kolos Nikopol             5   2  1  2   6- 7   5 
4.Metallurg Zaporozhye      5   1  1  3   5- 5   3 
5.Shinnik Yaroslavl         5   1  1  3   4- 7   3 
6.Iskra Smolensk            5   1  1  3   3- 6   3

==== Group 7 ====
[Dushanbe]
1.CSKA Moskva               5   4  1  0  10- 0   9  Qualified 
2.SKA Rostov-na-Donu        5   3  2  0   5- 1   8  Qualified 
--------------------------------------------------
3.Pamir Dushanbe            5   3  1  1   7- 3   7 
4.Kolhozchi Ashkhabad       5   1  1  3   3- 5   3 
5.UralMash Sverdlovsk       5   1  1  3   2- 4   3 
6.Guria Lanchkhuti          5   0  0  5   2-16   0

==== Group 8 ====
[Fergana]
1.Pahtakor Tashkent         4   3  0  1   7- 5   6  Qualified 
--------------------------------------------------
2.Traktor Pavlodar          4   2  2  0   6- 3   6 
3.Buston Jizak              4   1  1  2   4- 3   3 
4.Dinamo Stavropol          4   1  1  2   2- 4   3 
5.Alga Frunze               4   1  0  3   3- 7   2

=== Play-off stage ===
==== Round of 16 ====
[Mar 15] 
ARARAT Yerevan          3-2  Nistru Kishinev 
  [Robert Galustyan 38, Khoren Oganesyan 75 pen, Samvel Kasaboglyan 76 – 
   Yuriy Khlopotnov 18, Armenak Sarkisyan (A) 54 og. Att: 18,000] 
DINAMO Kiev             2-0  Kayrat Alma-Ata     [in Uzhgorod] 
  [Leonid Buryak 55, 73 pen. Att: 10,000] 
DINAMO Moskva           2-0  Dinamo Minsk        [in Sochi] 
  [Alexandr Bubnov 52, Alexei Petrushin 58. Att: 8,000] 
PAHTAKOR Tashkent       2-1  Neftchi Baku        [aet] 
  [Nizam Nartajiyev 102, Zurab Tsereteli 120 pen – Igor Sokolovskiy 111. Att: 7,000] 
[Mar 16] 
SKA Rostov-na-Donu      1-2  SHAKHTYOR Donetsk 
  [Vyacheslav Dekteryov 43 – Vitaliy Starukhin 28, Vladimir Safonov 32. Att: 6,000] 
SPARTAK Moskva          2-0  CSKA Moskva 
  [Sergei Shavlo 42 pen, Yevgeniy Sidorov 60. Att: 4,500] 
Tavria Simferopol       0-4  DINAMO Tbilisi 
  [Revaz Chelebadze 4 pen, Vakhtang Kopaleishvili 52, Vakhtang Koridze 83, 
   Vladimir Gutsayev 87. Att: 35,000] 
[Mar 20] 
TORPEDO Moskva          5-0  Fakel Voronezh 
  [Rais Gilmanov 5, 59, Nikolai Vasilyev 24, Vladimir Sakharov 48, 
   Viktor Losev 75. Att: 4,500]

==== Quarterfinals ====
[Mar 30] 
DINAMO Kiev             2-0  Dinamo Moskva       [in Uzhgorod] 
  [Vladimir Bessonov 48, Leonid Buryak 68 pen. Att: 10,000] 
DINAMO Tbilisi          2-1  Pahtakor Tashkent   [aet] 
  [Revaz Chelebadze 85 pen, 101 – Nuritdin Amriyev 50. Att: 45,000] 
SHAKHTYOR Donetsk       2-0  Torpedo Moskva      [in Gorlovka] 
  [Mikhail Sokolovskiy 30, Vitaliy Starukhin 67 pen. Att: 13,000] 
SPARTAK Moskva          1-0  Ararat Yerevan 
  [Yuriy Gavrilov 18. Att: 4,500]

==== Semifinals ====
[May 30] 
Dinamo Tbilisi         2-1  Dynamo Kyiv
  [ Alexandr Chivadze 50, Vitali Daraselia 85 – Vadym Yevtushenko 33. Att: 75,000] 
Spartak Moscow         0-1  Shakhtar Donetsk
  [ Mykhaylo Sokolovskyi 38. Att: 68,000]

==== Final ====
9 August 1980

| Shakhtar Donetsk | 2 – 1 | Dinamo Tbilisi |
|---|---|---|
| Starukhin 24'; Pyanykh 84' | Report | Chilaia 80' |

Lenin's Central Stadium, Moscow
Attendance: 51,000
Referee: Romualdas Juška (Vilnius)
