= 1980 Soviet Second League =

Second League
- Season: 1980

1980 Soviet Second League was a Soviet competition in the Soviet Second League.

== Qualifying groups ==
=== Group I [Russian Federation] ===
Pos	Team	Pld	W	D	L	GF	GA	GD	Pts
1	Spartak Kostroma	36	26	5	5	59	17	+42	57
2	Znamya Truda Orekhovo-Zuyevo	36	24	4	8	70	24	+46	52
3	Spartak Ryazan	36	23	6	7	55	26	+29	52
4	Saturn Rybinsk	36	20	9	7	61	28	+33	49
5	Spartak Tambov (Note: Revtrud Tambov changed name to Spartak.)	36	19	11	6	52	31	+21	49
6	Volga Kalinin	36	19	7	10	48	31	+17	45
7	Textilshchik Ivanovo	36	19	6	11	46	24	+22	44
8	TOZ Tula (Note: Mashinostroitel Tula changed name to TOZ.)	36	19	5	12	66	43	+23	43
9	Torpedo Vladimir	36	16	5	15	46	42	+4	37
10	Sever Murmansk	36	15	6	15	39	48	−9	36
11	Stroitel Cherepovets	36	12	11	13	40	43	−3	35
12	Moskvich Moskva	36	12	8	16	37	58	−21	32
13	Dinamo Leningrad	36	11	9	16	38	47	−9	31
14	Lokomotiv Kaluga	36	9	7	20	36	58	−22	25
15	Baltika Kaliningrad	36	10	4	22	30	47	−17	24
16	Dinamo Vologda	36	7	9	20	31	51	−20	23
17	Krasnaya Presnya Moskva	36	5	9	22	31	71	−40	19
18	FSM Moskva	36	5	9	22	22	64	−42	19
19	Volzhanin Kineshma	36	1	10	25	16	70	−54	12

=== Group II [Russian Federation] ===
Pos	Team	Pld	W	D	L	GF	GA	GD	Pts
1	Torpedo Togliatti	34	21	10	3	59	22	+37	52
2	Zvezda Perm	34	21	7	6	47	22	+25	49
3	Dinamo Kirov	34	18	10	6	51	26	+25	46
4	Lokomotiv Chelyabinsk (Note: Signal Chelyabinsk changed name to Lokomotiv.)	34	17	12	5	45	21	+24	46
5	Irtysh Omsk	34	18	6	10	47	32	+15	42
6	Khimik Dzerzhinsk	34	13	14	7	34	27	+7	40
7	Zenit Izhevsk	34	13	12	9	39	34	+5	38
8	Gastello Ufa	34	13	10	11	34	29	+5	36
9	Turbina Naberezhnyye Chelny	34	14	7	13	35	34	+1	35
10	Rubin Kazan	34	12	11	11	37	27	+10	35
11	Stal Cheboksary	34	13	7	14	37	31	+6	33
12	Fakel Tyumen (Note: Stroitel Tyumen changed name to Fakel.)	34	14	4	16	42	43	−1	32
13	Uralets Nizhniy Tagil	34	12	6	16	35	47	−12	30
14	Gazovik Orenburg	34	11	8	15	37	32	+5	30
15	Metallurg Magnitogorsk	34	8	7	19	25	51	−26	23
16	Volga Gorkiy	34	6	5	23	28	56	−28	17
17	Svetotekhnika Saransk	34	4	6	24	22	80	−58	14
18	Druzhba Yoshkar-Ola	34	3	8	23	23	63	−40	14

=== Group III [Russian Federation] ===
Pos	Team	Pld	W	D	L	GF	GA	GD	Pts
1	Rotor Volgograd	34	24	5	5	75	20	+55	53
2	Mashuk Pyatigorsk	34	23	5	6	43	25	+18	51
3	RostSelMash Rostov-na-Donu	34	20	4	10	65	28	+37	44
4	Terek Grozny	34	19	5	10	52	38	+14	43
5	Dinamo Makhachkala	34	18	4	12	50	32	+18	40
6	Metallurg Lipetsk	34	18	4	12	50	39	+11	40
7	Uralan Elista	34	16	4	14	49	55	−6	36
8	Spartak Oryol	34	15	6	13	43	40	+3	36
9	Cement Novorossiysk	34	15	6	13	42	37	+5	36
10	Torpedo Volzhskiy (Note: Trud Volzhskiy changed name to Torpedo.)	34	14	7	13	47	43	+4	35
11	Druzhba Maykop	34	11	10	13	39	40	−1	32
12	Torpedo Taganrog	34	11	7	16	39	50	−11	29
13	Atommash Volgodonsk	34	11	7	16	31	44	−13	29
14	Volgar Astrakhan	34	12	4	18	37	49	−12	28
15	Avangard Kursk	34	12	1	21	37	62	−25	25
16	Salyut Belgorod	34	10	5	19	40	60	−20	25
17	Sokol Saratov	34	9	4	21	38	64	−26	22
18	Dinamo Bryansk	34	3	2	29	28	79	−51	8

=== Group IV [Russian Federation] ===
Pos	Team	Pld	W	D	L	GF	GA	GD	Pts
1	Dinamo Barnaul	44	28	11	5	64	29	+35	67
2	Torpedo Rubtsovsk	44	23	11	10	74	49	+25	57
3	Lokomotiv Ulan-Ude	44	20	9	15	53	39	+14	49
4	Amur Blagoveshchensk	44	21	5	18	55	49	+6	47
5	Avtomobilist Krasnoyarsk	44	20	6	18	58	47	+11	46
6	Angara Angarsk	44	18	9	17	73	53	+20	45
7	Chkalovets Novosibirsk	44	18	6	20	55	58	−3	42
8	Zvezda Irkutsk	44	17	6	21	54	61	−7	40
9	Amur Komsomolsk-na-Amure	44	15	8	21	50	63	−13	38
10	Luch Vladivostok	44	12	11	21	40	60	−20	35
11	Zapsibovets Novokuznetsk	44	12	10	22	42	77	−35	34
12	Torpedo Tomsk (Note: Manometr Tomsk changed name to Torpedo.)	44	12	4	28	31	64	−33	28

=== Group V [Ukraine] ===
Pos	Team	Pld	W	D	L	GF	GA	GD	Pts	Qualification or relegation
1	SKA Kiev (C, Q)	44	28	9	7	83	33	+50	65	Qualified for interzonal competitions among other Zone winners
2	Bukovyna Chernivtsi	44	26	9	9	70	35	+35	61	
3	SKA Lviv	44	24	12	8	64	32	+32	60	
4	Avanhard Rivne	44	22	15	7	54	30	+24	59	
5	Sudnobudivnyk Mykolaiv	44	22	11	11	54	27	+27	55	
6	Zirka Kirovohrad	44	20	13	11	52	44	+8	53	
7	Spartak Zhytomyr	44	17	17	10	55	43	+12	51	
8	Desna Chernihiv	44	18	13	13	50	29	+21	49	
9	Atlantyka Sevastopol	44	18	11	15	53	49	+4	47	
10	Kryvbas Kryvyi Rih	44	16	15	13	55	47	+8	47	
11	Krystal Kherson	44	15	16	13	37	37	0	46	
12	Frunzenets Sumy	44	13	18	13	46	39	+7	44	
13	Nyva Vinnytsia	44	17	8	19	50	46	+4	42	
14	Okean Kerch	44	13	12	19	40	49	−9	38	
15	Hoverla Uzhhorod	44	12	14	18	38	44	−6	38	
16	Podillia Khmelnytskyi	44	13	9	22	32	64	−32	35	
17	Dnipro Cherkasy	44	13	9	22	43	50	−7	35	
18	Metalurh Dniprodzerzhynsk	44	11	11	22	47	58	−11	33	
19	Novator Zhdanov	44	11	11	22	38	62	−24	33	
20	Torpedo Lutsk	44	9	14	21	43	76	−33	32	
21	Kolos Poltava	44	9	13	22	37	61	−24	31	
22	Stakhanovets Stakhanov	44	11	8	25	22	56	−34	30	
23	Shakhtar Horlivka	44	11	6	27	40	92	−52	28	Avoided relegation

(C) Champions; (Q) Qualified for the phase indicated

=== Group VI (Central Asia) ===
Pos	Rep	Team	Pld	W	D	L	GF	GA	GD	Pts
1	UZB	Dinamo Samarkand	36	26	4	6	80	38	+42	56
2	UZB	Neftyanik Fergana	36	22	8	6	70	32	+38	52
3	UZB	Hiva	36	20	8	8	59	37	+22	48
4	UZB	Start Tashkent	36	18	9	9	62	36	+26	45
5	UZB	Horezm Yangiaryk	36	18	9	9	53	36	+17	45
6	UZB	Avtomobilist Termez	36	18	6	12	54	31	+23	42
7	UZB	Sohibkor Yangiyul	36	18	6	12	59	44	+15	42
8	UZB	Zarafshan Navoi	36	15	9	12	47	36	+11	39
9	UZB	Shahrihanets Shahrihan	36	15	6	15	48	46	+2	36
10	UZB	Hisar Shahrisabz	36	13	9	14	47	59	−12	35
11	UZB	Narimanovets Bagat	36	15	4	17	37	43	−6	34
12	UZB	Yeshlik Turakurgan	36	13	7	16	41	49	−8	33
13	UZB	Pahtachi Gulistan	36	12	8	16	39	45	−6	32
14	UZB	Yangiyer	36	12	7	17	40	41	−1	31
15	TJK	Hojent Leninabad	36	13	3	20	40	60	−20	29
16	UZB	Amudarya Nukus	36	10	6	20	36	65	−29	26
17	UZB	KarshiStroi Karshi	36	11	3	22	39	58	−19	25
18	TJK	Pahtakor Kurgan-Tyube	36	7	5	24	38	83	−45	19
19	UZB	Buhara	36	6	3	27	28	78	−50	15

=== Group VII (Kazakhstan) ===
Pos	Rep	Team	Pld	W	D	L	GF	GA	GD	Pts
1	KAZ	Traktor Pavlodar	38	28	9	1	86	29	+57	65
2	KGZ	Alga Frunze	38	26	7	5	81	20	+61	59
3	KAZ	Aktyubinets Aktyubinsk	38	26	3	9	68	27	+41	55
4	KAZ	Tselinnik Tselinograd	38	24	7	7	76	27	+49	55
5	KAZ	Ekibastuzets Ekibastuz (Note: Ugolshchik Ekibastuz changed name to Ekibastuzets.)	38	23	6	9	62	41	+21	52
6	KAZ	Shakhtyor Karaganda	38	21	6	11	64	39	+25	48
7	KAZ	Khimik Jambul	38	18	10	10	46	32	+14	46
8	KAZ	Metallurg Chimkent	38	19	7	12	59	34	+25	45
9	KAZ	Spartak Semipalatinsk	38	18	5	15	62	53	+9	41
10	KAZ	Jezkazganets Jezkazgan	38	15	10	13	41	43	−2	40
11	KAZ	Bulat Temirtau	38	15	8	15	50	47	+3	38
12	KAZ	Vostok Ust-Kamenogorsk	38	11	11	16	50	43	+7	33
13	KAZ	Khimik Stepnogorsk	38	13	6	19	43	51	−8	32
14	KAZ	Torpedo Kokchetav	38	12	7	19	44	53	−9	31
15	KAZ	Meliorator Kzil-Orda	38	9	11	18	48	65	−17	29
16	KAZ	Uralets Uralsk	38	9	6	23	22	72	−50	24
17	KAZ	Avangard Petropavlovsk	38	6	12	20	30	59	−29	24
18	KAZ	Trud Shevchenko	38	6	9	23	25	70	−45	21
19	KAZ	Prikaspiyets Guryev	38	5	5	28	27	95	−68	15
20	KAZ	SKIF Alma-Ata	38	2	3	33	16	100	−84	7

=== Group VIII (Soviet Republics) ===
Pos	Rep	Team	Pld	W	D	L	GF	GA	GD	Pts
1	BLR	Khimik Grodno	32	18	8	6	41	23	+18	44
2	LVA	Daugava Riga	32	18	5	9	55	28	+27	41
3	MDA	Avtomobilist Tiraspol	32	15	5	12	37	24	+13	35
4	BLR	Dinamo Brest	32	12	10	10	39	36	+3	34
5	LTU	Atlantas Klaipeda	32	13	7	12	30	28	+2	33
6	BLR	GomSelMash Gomel	32	12	8	12	31	33	−2	32
7	BLR	Dnepr Mogilyov	32	9	9	14	37	48	−11	27
8	LVA	Zvejnieks Liepaja	32	6	10	16	22	48	−26	22
9	BLR	Dvina Vitebsk	32	5	10	17	23	47	−24	20

=== Group IX (Caucasus) ===
Pos	Rep	Team	Pld	W	D	L	GF	GA	GD	Pts
1	GEO	Lokomotiv Samtredia	30	18	7	5	53	27	+26	43
2	ARM	Kotaik Abovyan	30	19	4	7	62	24	+38	42
3	ARM	Arabkir Yerevan	30	16	3	11	47	37	+10	35
4	GEO	Dinamo Sukhumi	30	15	3	12	48	31	+17	33
5	GEO	Kolkheti Poti	30	15	3	12	45	39	+6	33
6	TKM	Kolhozchi Ashkhabad	30	14	4	12	47	39	+8	32
7	AZE	Hazar Lenkoran	30	12	7	11	35	30	+5	31
8	AZE	Avtomobilist Mingechaur	30	12	6	12	39	37	+2	30
9	AZE	Progress Kirovabad	30	13	2	15	37	46	−9	28
10	GEO	Dinamo Batumi	30	12	4	14	34	47	−13	28
11	AZE	Karabakh Stepanakert	30	12	4	14	40	43	−3	28
12	GEO	Dila Gori	30	12	3	15	49	53	−4	27
13	GEO	Metallurg Rustavi	30	11	4	15	37	43	−6	26
14	GEO	Dinamo Zugdidi	30	11	2	17	31	56	−25	24
15	ARM	Shirak Leninakan	30	5	11	14	28	43	−15	21
16	AZE	Araz Nahichevan	30	6	7	17	23	60	−37	19

== Final group stage ==
[Oct 26 – Nov 12]

=== Group A ===
Pos	Rep	Team	Pld	W	D	L	GF	GA	GD	Pts	Promotion
1	RUS	Spartak Kostroma	4	2	1	1	4	7	−3	5	Promoted
2	RUS	Rotor Volgograd	4	2	0	2	8	5	+3	4	
3	GEO	Lokomotiv Samtredia	4	1	1	2	4	4	0	3	

=== Group B ===
Pos	Rep	Team	Pld	W	D	L	GF	GA	GD	Pts	Promotion
1	KAZ	Traktor Pavlodar	4	2	1	1	5	2	+3	5	Promoted
2	UZB	Dinamo Samarkand	4	2	1	1	7	4	+3	5	
3	RUS	Torpedo Togliatti	4	1	0	3	3	9	−6	2	

=== Group C ===
Pos	Rep	Team	Pld	W	D	L	GF	GA	GD	Pts	Promotion
1	UKR	SKA Kiev	4	2	2	0	8	5	+3	6	Promoted
2	BLR	Khimik Grodno	4	1	3	0	5	4	+1	5	
3	RUS	Dinamo Barnaul	4	0	1	3	3	7	−4	1	

Source: rsssf.com
