= 1981 Soviet Second League =

Second League
- Season: 1981

1981 Soviet Second League was a Soviet competition in the Soviet Second League.

== Qualifying groups ==
=== Group I [Russian Federation] ===
Pos	Team	Pld	W	D	L	GF	GA	GD	Pts
1	Textilshchik Ivanovo	32	23	4	5	64	32	+32	50
2	Znamya Truda Orekhovo-Zuyevo	32	18	7	7	48	26	+22	43
3	Dinamo Leningrad	32	18	6	8	48	34	+14	42
4	Dinamo Bryansk	32	17	6	9	47	25	+22	40
5	Baltika Kaliningrad	32	17	6	9	47	28	+19	40
6	Saturn Rybinsk	32	15	9	8	55	35	+20	39
7	Dinamo Vologda	32	14	8	10	50	36	+14	36
8	Stroitel Cherepovets	32	14	6	12	50	36	+14	34
9	Spartak Ryazan	32	14	6	12	43	37	+6	34
10	Krasnaya Presnya Moskva	32	14	5	13	43	38	+5	33
11	Lokomotiv Kaluga	32	10	10	12	27	39	−12	30
12	Volga Kalinin	32	9	12	11	42	31	+11	30
13	Sever Murmansk	32	10	6	16	42	62	−20	26
14	Moskvich Moskva	32	6	8	18	21	50	−29	20
15	FSM Moskva	32	7	5	20	23	62	−39	19
16	Volzhanin Kineshma	32	6	3	23	33	70	−37	15
17	TOZ Tula	32	4	5	23	25	67	−42	13

=== Group II [Russian Federation] ===
Pos	Team	Pld	W	D	L	GF	GA	GD	Pts
1	Dinamo Kirov	32	22	6	4	62	24	+38	50
2	Lokomotiv Chelyabinsk	32	16	10	6	44	26	+18	42
3	Zenit Izhevsk	32	15	9	8	52	31	+21	39
4	Khimik Dzerzhinsk	32	15	6	11	42	34	+8	36
5	Rubin Kazan	32	14	8	10	46	30	+16	36
6	Druzhba Yoshkar-Ola	32	13	9	10	38	42	−4	35
7	Krylya Sovetov Kuibyshev	32	11	13	8	41	26	+15	35
8	Torpedo Togliatti	32	13	7	12	52	50	+2	33
9	Svetotekhnika Saransk	32	10	11	11	31	37	−6	31
10	Turbina Naberezhnyye Chelny	32	10	11	11	33	41	−8	31
11	Gazovik Orenburg	32	12	6	14	41	44	−3	30
12	Volga Gorkiy	32	10	9	13	38	48	−10	29
13	Gastello Ufa	32	10	7	15	33	45	−12	27
14	Stal Cheboksary	32	8	11	13	23	38	−15	27
15	Sokol Saratov	32	8	9	15	42	52	−10	25
16	Metallurg Magnitogorsk	32	5	12	15	26	43	−17	22
17	Torpedo Vladimir	32	6	4	22	24	57	−33	16

=== Group III [Russian Federation] ===
Pos	Team	Pld	W	D	L	GF	GA	GD	Pts
1	Rotor Volgograd	34	24	5	5	89	35	+54	53
2	RostSelMash Rostov-na-Donu	34	22	6	6	64	33	+31	50
3	Terek Grozny	34	22	4	8	67	32	+35	48
4	Torpedo Taganrog	34	18	7	9	55	43	+12	43
5	Metallurg Lipetsk	34	18	4	12	59	30	+29	40
6	Volgar Astrakhan	34	15	9	10	57	46	+11	39
7	Uralan Elista	34	15	8	11	47	36	+11	38
8	Spartak Nalchik	34	14	8	12	48	42	+6	36
9	Cement Novorossiysk	34	12	10	12	33	34	−1	34
10	Spartak Oryol	34	15	2	17	48	67	−19	32
11	Salyut Belgorod	34	12	7	15	30	37	−7	31
12	Druzhba Maykop	34	10	11	13	40	48	−8	31
13	Dinamo Makhachkala	34	12	6	16	40	48	−8	30
14	Spartak Tambov	34	8	9	17	24	43	−19	25
15	Mashuk Pyatigorsk	34	8	7	19	35	73	−38	23
16	Avangard Kursk	34	5	12	17	26	52	−26	22
17	Torpedo Volzhskiy	34	6	8	20	41	64	−23	20
18	Atommash Volgodonsk	34	6	5	23	31	71	−40	17

=== Group IV [Russian Federation] ===
Pos	Team	Pld	W	D	L	GF	GA	GD	Pts
1	Dinamo Barnaul	32	20	6	6	52	22	+30	46
2	Angara Angarsk	32	20	4	8	56	27	+29	44
3	Irtysh Omsk	32	18	5	9	53	29	+24	41
4	Avtomobilist Krasnoyarsk	32	17	7	8	47	26	+21	41
5	Uralets Nizhniy Tagil	32	13	11	8	43	36	+7	37
6	Luch Vladivostok	32	15	5	12	50	37	+13	35
7	Manometr Tomsk (Note: Torpedo Tomsk changed name to Manometr.)	32	15	5	12	51	38	+13	35
8	UralMash Sverdlovsk	32	14	5	13	50	36	+14	33
9	Amur Blagoveshchensk	32	13	7	12	45	37	+8	33
10	Zapsibovets Novokuznetsk	32	13	6	13	40	40	0	32
11	Zvezda Perm	32	11	8	13	40	41	−1	30
12	Zvezda Irkutsk	32	11	8	13	39	43	−4	30
13	Torpedo Rubtsovsk	32	12	3	17	47	56	−9	27
14	Lokomotiv Ulan-Ude	32	10	6	16	29	49	−20	26
15	Amur Komsomolsk-na-Amure	32	9	8	15	29	47	−18	26
16	Fakel Tyumen	32	7	7	18	29	59	−30	21
17	Chkalovets Novosibirsk	32	2	3	27	6	83	−77	7

=== Group V [Ukraine] ===
Pos	Team	Pld	W	D	L	GF	GA	GD	Pts	Qualification or relegation
1	Kryvbas Kryvyi Rih (C, Q)	44	25	15	4	68	33	+35	65	Qualified for interzonal competitions among other Zone winners
2	Nyva Vinnytsia	44	23	11	10	60	34	+26	57	
3	Avanhard Rivne	44	21	14	9	62	23	+39	56	
4	Bukovyna Chernivtsi	44	23	9	12	58	28	+30	55	
5	Sudnobudivnyk Mykolaiv	44	19	13	12	50	39	+11	51	
6	Atlantyka Sevastopol	44	18	15	11	64	40	+24	51	
7	Vuhlyk Horlivka	44	16	19	9	53	44	+9	51	
8	Torpedo Lutsk	44	20	8	16	56	35	+21	48	
9	SKA Lviv	44	16	15	13	49	47	+2	47	Merged with Karpaty Lviv
10	Kolos Mezhyrich	44	19	8	17	50	49	+1	46	
11	Spartak Zhytomyr	44	15	13	16	38	47	−9	43	
12	Desna Chernihiv	44	13	15	16	48	38	+10	41	
13	Okean Kerch	44	13	14	17	45	51	−6	40	
14	Podillia Khmelnytskyi	44	15	9	20	45	64	−19	39	
15	Krystal Kherson	44	15	9	20	62	73	−11	39	
16	Novator Zhdanov	44	14	11	19	41	63	−22	39	
17	Zirka Kirovohrad	44	10	19	15	36	36	0	39	
18	Zakarpattia Uzhhorod	44	13	12	19	41	44	−3	38	
19	Kolos Poltava	44	11	16	17	33	61	−28	38	
20	Dnipro Cherkasy	44	13	11	20	44	55	−11	37	
21	Frunzenets Sumy	44	9	19	16	36	56	−20	37	
22	Metalurh Dniprodzerzhynsk	44	8	13	23	31	71	−40	29	
23	Shakhtar Stakhanov	44	10	6	28	34	73	−39	26	Avoided relegation

(C) Champions; (Q) Qualified for the phase indicated

=== Group VI (Central Asia) ===
Pos	Rep	Team	Pld	W	D	L	GF	GA	GD	Pts
1	UZB	Neftyanik Fergana	40	29	6	5	88	26	+62	64
2	UZB	Dinamo Samarkand	40	27	7	6	76	33	+43	61
3	UZB	Novbahor Namangan	40	21	11	8	67	34	+33	53
4	UZB	Hiva	40	20	9	11	62	48	+14	49
5	UZB	Avtomobilist Termez	40	19	10	11	68	51	+17	48
6	UZB	Yangiyer (Note: Sohibkor Yangiyul relocated to Halkabad.)	40	18	11	11	60	40	+20	47
7	UZB	Yeshlik Turakurgan	40	18	10	12	56	46	+10	46
8	UZB	Start Tashkent	40	17	11	12	48	35	+13	45
9	UZB	Horezm Yangiaryk	40	16	11	13	60	45	+15	43
10	KGZ	Alay Osh	40	16	11	13	52	51	+1	43
11	UZB	Pahtachi Gulistan	40	17	6	17	60	53	+7	40
12	UZB	Hisar Shahrisabz	40	17	5	18	69	68	+1	39
13	UZB	Zarafshan Navoi	40	17	5	18	42	46	−4	39
14	UZB	Narimanovets Bagat	40	15	9	16	60	47	+13	39
15	UZB	Sohibkor Halkabad	40	15	7	18	51	52	−1	37
16	TJK	Hojent Leninabad	40	14	6	20	45	71	−26	34
17	UZB	Shahrihanets Shahrihan	40	12	8	20	46	80	−34	32
18	UZB	KarshiStroi Karshi	40	12	6	22	57	84	−27	30
19	UZB	Amudarya Nukus	40	8	9	23	36	78	−42	25
20	TJK	Pahtakor Kurgan-Tyube	40	7	9	24	50	71	−21	23
21	KGZ	Semetey Frunze	40	0	3	37	11	105	−94	3

=== Group VII [Kazakhstan] ===
Pos	Rep	Team	Pld	W	D	L	GF	GA	GD	Pts
1	KAZ	Aktyubinets Aktyubinsk	36	28	4	4	75	23	+52	60
2	KAZ	Shakhtyor Karaganda	36	26	5	5	79	27	+52	57
3	KAZ	Tselinnik Tselinograd	36	22	7	7	70	38	+32	51
4	KGZ	Alga Frunze	36	20	9	7	69	27	+42	49
5	KAZ	Meliorator Chimkent (Note: Metallurg Chimkent changed name to Meliorator.)	36	19	8	9	54	33	+21	46
6	KAZ	Vostok Ust-Kamenogorsk	36	20	3	13	80	54	+26	43
7	KAZ	Khimik Jambul	36	19	4	13	64	37	+27	42
8	KAZ	Bulat Temirtau	36	17	8	11	50	44	+6	42
9	KAZ	Ekibastuzets Ekibastuz	36	16	10	10	36	30	+6	42
10	KAZ	Spartak Semipalatinsk	36	15	8	13	53	43	+10	38
11	KAZ	Jezkazganets Jezkazgan	36	14	6	16	37	47	−10	34
12	KAZ	Meliorator Kzil-Orda	36	13	6	17	43	51	−8	32
13	KAZ	Avangard Petropavlovsk	36	11	6	19	35	64	−29	28
14	KAZ	Torpedo Kokchetav	36	9	6	21	28	59	−31	24
15	KAZ	Khimik Stepnogorsk	36	8	8	20	32	60	−28	24
16	KAZ	Zhetysu Taldy-Kurgan	36	7	10	19	31	56	−25	24
17	KAZ	Uralets Uralsk	36	7	7	22	24	72	−48	21
18	KAZ	Prikaspiyets Guryev	36	5	4	27	20	75	−55	14
19	KAZ	SKIF Alma-Ata	36	3	7	26	26	66	−40	13

=== Group VIII (Soviet Republics) ===
For places 1-4 

Pos	Rep	Team	Pld	W	D	L	GF	GA	GD	Pts
1	LVA	Daugava Riga	38	19	13	6	61	38	+23	51
2	BLR	Dnepr Mogilyov	38	20	5	13	59	40	+19	45
3	MDA	Avtomobilist Tiraspol	38	14	15	9	43	33	+10	43
4	BLR	Khimik Grodno	38	14	13	11	48	44	+4	41

=== Group IX (Caucasus) ===
For places 1-8

Pos	Rep	Team	Pld	W	D	L	GF	GA	GD	Pts
1	ARM	Kotaik Abovyan	44	29	10	5	79	37	+42	68
2	GEO	Lokomotiv Samtredia	44	24	11	9	80	43	+37	59
3	GEO	Dinamo Sukhumi	44	20	10	14	73	58	+15	50
4	AZE	Karabakh Stepanakert	44	19	11	14	69	60	+9	49
5	TKM	Kolhozchi Ashkhabad	44	20	7	17	74	65	+9	47
6	ARM	Shirak Leninakan	44	20	6	18	69	62	+7	46
7	AZE	Hazar Lenkoran	44	19	8	17	82	65	+17	46
8	ARM	Spartak Oktemberyan	44	18	4	22	69	68	+1	40

== Final group stage ==
[Oct 26 – Nov 12]

=== Group A ===
Pos	Rep	Team	Pld	W	D	L	GF	GA	GD	Pts	Promotion
1	LVA	Daugava Riga	4	3	0	1	11	5	+6	6	Promoted
2	ARM	Kotaik Abovyan	4	2	0	2	7	9	−2	4	
3	UZB	Neftyanik Fergana	4	1	0	3	3	7	−4	2	

=== Group B ===
Pos	Rep	Team	Pld	W	D	L	GF	GA	GD	Pts	Promotion
1	RUS	Dinamo Kirov	4	3	0	1	9	4	+5	6	Promoted
2	UKR	Krivbass Krivoi Rog	4	3	0	1	10	6	+4	6	
3	KAZ	Aktyubinets Aktyubinsk	4	0	0	4	3	12	−9	0	

=== Group C ===
Pos	Rep	Team	Pld	W	D	L	GF	GA	GD	Pts	Promotion
1	RUS	Rotor Volgograd	4	3	0	1	7	4	+3	6	Promoted
2	RUS	Dinamo Barnaul	4	1	1	2	5	7	−2	3	
3	RUS	Textilshchik Ivanovo	4	1	1	2	4	5	−1	3	

Source: rsssf.com
