= Serhiy Kravchenko (footballer, born 1956) =

Ukrainian footballer and coach

Personal information
- Full name: Serhiy Dmytrovych Kravchenko
- Date of birth: 7 October 1956 (age 70)
- Place of birth: Voroshilov, Russian SFSR, Soviet Union
- Height: 1.81 m (5 ft 11 in)
- Positions: Forward; second striker

Youth career
- FC Shakhtar Donetsk

Senior career*
Years	Team	Apps	(Gls)
1978	FC Shakhtar Horlivka	16	(3)
1979–1981	FC Shakhtar Donetsk	39	(12)
1982–1983	FC SKA Rostov-na-Donu	31	(8)
1984–1986	FC Shakhtar Donetsk	61	(13)
1987	FC Shakhtar Horlivka	36	(10)
1987–1988	FC Geolog Tyumen	45	(7)
1989	FC Metalurh Zaporizhia	7	(0)
1989	FC Kolos Nikopol	24	(3)
1990	FC Kremin Kremenchuk	20	(4)
1990–1991	FC Prometei Shakhtarsk	?	(?)
1991–1993	TTS Trenčín	?	(?)
1993–1994	FC Shakhtar Snizhne	19	(0)
1995	FC Shakhta Lidiivka Donetsk	12	(0)

Managerial career
- 1997: FC Metalurh-2 Donetsk
- 1998: FC Metalurh Donetsk (assistant)
- 2005: FC SKA Khabarovsk (assistant)
- * Club domestic league appearances and goals

Serhiy Kravchenko (Ukrainian: Сергій Дмитрович Кравченко; born 7 October 1956) is a Ukrainian football coach and a former player.

== Personal life ==
His sons are Ukrainian former football player and current football coach Serhiy Kravchenko and Ukrainian racecar driver Andriy Kravchenko.
