= 1980 Soviet Top League =

43rd season of top-tier football league in Soviet Union

Soviet Top League
- Season: 1980
- Champions: Dinamo Kiev
- Relegated: Karpaty Lvov, Lokomotiv Moscow
- European Cup: Dinamo Kiev
- Cup Winners' Cup: Dinamo Tbilisi
- UEFA Cup: Spartak Moscow; CSKA Moscow; Zenit Leningrad
- Matches: 306
- Goals: 690 (2.25 per match)
- Top goalscorer: (20) Sergey Andreyev (SKA)

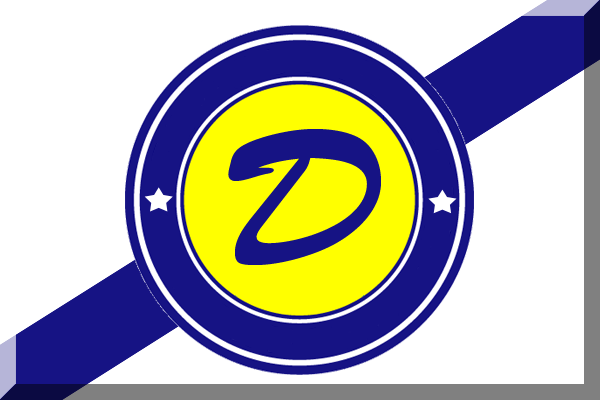
Dynamo Kyiv fantasy flag

Statistics of Soviet Top League for the 1980 season.

== Overview ==
It was contested by 18 teams, and Dynamo Kyiv won the championship.

== League standings ==
Pos	Team	Pld	W	D	L	GF	GA	GD	Pts	Qualification or relegation
1	(Ukrainian Soviet Socialist Republic) Dynamo Kyiv (C)	34	21	9	4	63	23	+40	51	Qualification for European Cup first round
2	(Russian Soviet Federative Socialist Republic) Spartak Moscow	34	18	9	7	49	26	+23	45	Qualification for UEFA Cup first round
3	(Russian Soviet Federative Socialist Republic) Zenit Leningrad	34	16	10	8	51	42	+9	42	Qualification for UEFA Cup first round
4	(Georgian Soviet Socialist Republic) Dinamo Tbilisi	34	16	7	11	51	32	+19	39	Qualification for Cup Winners' Cup first round (Note: Dinamo Tbilisi qualified for the Cup Winners' Cup as defending champions.)
5	(Russian Soviet Federative Socialist Republic) CSKA Moscow	34	13	12	9	36	32	+4	36 (Note: 2 points deducted (10 draw limit))	Qualification for UEFA Cup first round
6	(Ukrainian Soviet Socialist Republic) Shakhtar Donetsk	34	13	9	12	45	40	+5	35	
7	(Ukrainian Soviet Socialist Republic) Chornomorets Odessa	34	13	9	12	37	37	0	35	
8	(Byelorussian Soviet Socialist Republic) Dinamo Minsk	34	11	12	11	41	42	−1	32	
9	(Armenian Soviet Socialist Republic) Ararat Yerevan	34	11	11	12	39	43	−4	32 (Note: 1 point deducted (10 draw limit))	
10	(Russian Soviet Federative Socialist Republic) SKA Rostov-on-Don	34	11	10	13	41	47	−6	32	Qualification for Cup Winners' Cup first round
11	(Russian Soviet Federative Socialist Republic) Torpedo Moscow	34	10	11	13	28	32	−4	30	
12	(Kazakh Soviet Socialist Republic) Kairat Alma-Ata	34	10	11	13	33	44	−11	30	
13	(Azerbaijan Soviet Socialist Republic) Neftchi Baku	34	10	9	15	29	41	−12	29	
14	(Russian Soviet Federative Socialist Republic) Dynamo Moscow	34	9	14	11	32	33	−1	28 (Note: 4 points deducted (10 draw limit))	
15	(Russian Soviet Federative Socialist Republic) Kuban Krasnodar	34	9	10	15	32	43	−11	28	
16	(Uzbek Soviet Socialist Republic) Pakhtakor Tashkent	34	9	8	17	26	43	−17	26	
17	(Ukrainian Soviet Socialist Republic) Karpaty Lviv (R)	34	9	8	17	23	46	−23	26	Relegation to First League
18	(Russian Soviet Federative Socialist Republic) Lokomotiv Moscow (R)	34	8	9	17	34	44	−10	25	Relegation to First League

(C) Champions; (R) Relegated

== Results ==
Home \ Away	ARA	CHO	CSK	DYK	DMN	DYN	DTB	KAI	KAR	KUB	LOK	NEF	PAK	SHA	SKA	SPA	TOR	ZEN
Ararat Yerevan		0–0	0–2	3–3	2–1	1–1	0–1	0–1	2–0	1–1	2–1	3–0	5–2	2–0	1–1	2–1	1–0	0–0
Chornomorets Odessa	0–0		0–0	2–1	3–2	1–1	1–0	2–1	1–1	3–0	1–0	0–1	2–0	1–1	1–1	0–0	4–2	2–0
CSKA Moscow	1–0	2–0		2–2	1–1	0–0	0–2	2–2	2–0	0–0	0–1	0–0	0–0	1–3	3–1	0–0	4–1	2–1
Dynamo Kyiv	2–1	1–0	3–0		2–0	2–0	1–0	5–0	3–0	4–0	2–0	2–0	1–0	5–0	4–0	2–0	0–0	2–2
Dinamo Minsk	2–1	1–1	1–0	2–0		1–0	1–1	2–1	1–1	1–0	2–1	1–1	0–1	2–1	1–0	2–0	0–0	2–2
Dynamo Moscow	0–2	3–1	1–2	1–0	2–1		1–1	1–1	0–0	0–0	0–1	2–1	4–1	0–1	1–1	2–2	1–1	1–1
Dinamo Tbilisi	4–1	1–0	2–0	0–1	4–0	1–0		3–0	2–0	3–0	1–0	1–2	1–1	3–0	0–0	2–4	2–1	5–1
Kairat Alma-Ata	3–2	2–1	1–1	2–2	1–1	0–1	0–0		2–0	2–1	1–1	2–1	0–1	0–0	3–2	1–0	0–1	2–0
Karpaty Lviv	0–0	1–2	1–2	2–4	3–1	1–0	1–2	0–0		2–1	1–0	2–0	1–0	1–0	1–0	1–0	0–4	1–2
Kuban Krasnodar	2–0	4–0	0–1	1–1	3–2	0–3	2–2	2–0	3–0		0–0	2–1	3–0	1–0	0–1	0–0	1–0	0–2
Lokomotiv Moscow	2–2	0–1	0–2	1–1	1–3	3–0	0–0	1–0	3–0	1–1		3–1	0–1	1–1	2–3	1–2	0–0	2–4
Neftçi Baku	1–1	1–0	1–0	0–1	1–0	1–0	2–0	2–0	0–0	1–1	3–0		2–2	1–3	0–4	0–0	0–0	0–2
Pakhtakor Tashkent	1–2	0–1	3–0	0–1	1–0	1–2	0–3	1–0	1–0	1–1	0–2	2–2		0–0	2–1	1–2	0–0	1–0
Shakhtar Donetsk	5–1	1–0	1–2	0–1	2–2	3–2	3–0	0–1	1–1	3–0	2–2	2–1	2–1		2–0	0–2	2–0	5–2
SKA Rostov-on-Don	1–3	3–2	2–2	0–0	0–0	0–1	2–1	2–2	3–1	2–0	2–1	0–2	1–1	0–0		1–1	1–0	2–0
Spartak Moscow	5–0	2–4	0–1	1–0	1–0	0–0	2–1	3–0	3–0	2–1	2–1	3–0	2–0	2–0	2–1		1–0	1–1
Torpedo Moscow	1–0	1–0	1–1	1–2	0–0	1–1	2–0	2–2	0–0	2–1	1–2	1–0	1–0	1–0	0–1	0–2		2–0
Zenit Leningrad	2–0	3–0	1–0	2–2	5–3	0–0	3–2	1–0	1–0	2–0	2–0	1–0	1–0	1–1	2–2	1–1	3–1	

Legend: Blue = home team win; Yellow = draw; Red = away team win.

== Top scorers ==
20 goals

- Sergey Andreyev (SKA Rostov-on-Don)

19 goals

- Oleg Blokhin (Dynamo Kyiv)

17 goals

- Ramaz Shengelia (Dinamo Tbilisi)

14 goals

- Yuriy Horyachev (Chornomorets)
- Aleksandr Tarkhanov (CSKA Moscow)

12 goals

- Vladimir Kazachyonok (Zenit)
- Valeriy Petrakov (Lokomotiv Moscow)

11 goals

- Revaz Chelebadze (Dinamo Tbilisi)

10 goals

- Andranik Khachatryan (Ararat)
- Pyotr Vasilevsky (Dinamo Minsk)

== Attendances ==
No.	Club	Average
1	Dinamo Tbilisi	45,471
2	Kuban	31,706
3	Shakhtar	29,118
4	Zenit	27,176
5	Dynamo Kyiv	25,971
6	Spartak Moscow	23,059
7	Rostov-on-Don	23,059
8	Karpaty	22,824
9	Paxtakor	21,647
10	Dinamo Minsk	20,706
11	Kairat	18,882
12	Ararat	17,794
13	Chornomorets	16,118
14	Neftçhi	16,000
15	Dynamo Moscow	10,088
16	Torpedo Moscow	8,324
17	PFC CSKA	8,029
18	Lokomotiv Moscow	3,088
