= Ivan Vyshnevskyi =

Footballer from Ukraine

Personal information
- Full name: Ivan Yevhenovych Vyshnevskyi
- Date of birth: 21 February 1957
- Place of birth: Chortoryia, Ternopil Oblast, Ukrainian SSR
- Date of death: 11 May 1996 (aged 39)
- Position: Defender

Senior career*
Years	Team	Apps	(Gls)
1980–1981	FC Nyva Vinnytsia		
1982	FC Spartak Moscow	2	(0)
1983–1984	FC Nyva Vinnytsia		
1984–1989	FC Dnipro Dnipropetrovsk	150	(1)
1989–1990	Fenerbahçe S.K.	15	(0)
1990–1992	Sarıyer G.K.	40	(0)

International career
1985–1988	USSR	6	(0)

Managerial career
- FC Nyva Vinnytsia (assistant)
- FC Dnipro Dnipropetrovsk (assistant)
- * Club domestic league appearances and goals

Ivan Yevhenovych Vyshnevskyi (Ukrainian: Іван Євгенович Вишневський, Russian: Иван Евгеньевич Вишневский; born 21 February 1957 in the village of Chortoryia (today's Myrolyubivka, Ternopil Raion); died 11 May 1996 in Dnipropetrovsk of melanoma) was a Ukrainian footballer.

== Career ==
He earned six caps for the USSR national football team, making his debut on 25 January 1985 in a friendly against Yugoslavia. He was selected for the UEFA Euro 1988 squad, but did not play in any games at the tournament.

He is from the region that once belonged to Wiśniowiecki family that had estates near Zboriv where the village of Vyshnivets is located.

== Honours ==
- Soviet Top League winner: 1988.
- Soviet Top League runner-up: 1987, 1989.
- Soviet Top League bronze: 1984, 1985.
- Soviet Cup winner: 1989.
- Turkish President Cup winner: 1990.
- Turkish Prime Minister Cup winner: 1989.
- Turkish Super League runner-up: 1990.
