= 1983 FC Dynamo Kyiv season =

Dynamo Kyiv
1983 season
- Manager: Yuriy Morozov
- Stadium: Republican Stadium
- Vysshaya Liga: 7th
- Soviet Cup: Quarter-finals
- 1982–83 European Cup: Quarter-finals
- 1983–84 UEFA Cup: First round
Home colours	Away colours	Third colours

The 1983 season was the 46th season in the top Soviet football league for Dynamo Kyiv. Dynamo competed in Vysshaya Liga, and Soviet Cup. Last season 2nd place runner-up, this season Dynamo placed only 7th with 10 league's losses.

In 1983 there was established a farm-team in the Kyiv's suburb of Irpin, Dynamo Irpin and managed by Viktor Kanevskyi.

== Players ==
=== First squad information ===
Squad no.	Name	Nationality	Position	Date of birth (age)	Signed from	Signed in
Goalkeepers
	Mykhailo Mykhailov	(Soviet Union) / (Russia)	GK	6 July 1959 (aged 24)	Dnipro Dnipropetrovsk	1980
	Viktor Chanov	(Soviet Union) / (Ukraine)	GK	21 July 1959 (aged 24)	Shakhtar Donetsk	1982
Defenders
	Sergei Baltacha	(Soviet Union) / (Ukraine)	DF	17 February 1958 (aged 25)	Metalist Kharkiv	1976
	Oleksandr Huyhanov	(Soviet Union) / (Ukraine)	DF/MF	17 February 1958 (aged 25)	Atlantyka Sevastopol	1980
	Anatoliy Demyanenko	(Soviet Union) / (Ukraine)	DF	19 February 1959 (aged 24)	Dnipro Dnipropetrovsk	1979
	Vasyl Yevseyev	(Soviet Union) / (Ukraine)	DF	30 August 1962 (aged 21)	Zaria Voroshilovgrad	1983
	Serhiy Zhuravlyov	(Soviet Union) / (Ukraine)	DF	24 April 1959 (aged 24)	Zaria Voroshilovgrad	1979
	Oleh Kuznetsov	(Soviet Union) / (East Germany)	DF	22 March 1963 (aged 20)	Desna Chernihiv	1983
	Volodymyr Lozynskyi	(Soviet Union) / (Russia)	DF	6 January 1955 (aged 28)	Dynamo Kyiv Sports School	1972
	Mykhailo Olefirenko	(Soviet Union) / (Ukraine)	DF	6 June 1960 (aged 23)	RVUFK Kyiv	1977
	Igor Savelev	(Soviet Union) / (Russia)	DF/MF	18 September 1962 (aged 21)	Rubin Kazan	1982
	Oleksandr Sorokalet	(Soviet Union) / (Ukraine)	DF/MF	16 April 1957 (aged 26)	Zaria Voroshilovgrad	1980
	Valeriy Chernikov	(Soviet Union)	DF	27 April 1962 (aged 21)	RVUFK Kyiv	1980
Midfielders
	Andriy Bal	(Soviet Union) / (Ukraine)	MF	16 February 1958 (aged 25)	Karpaty Lviv	1981
	Volodymyr Bezsonov	(Soviet Union) / (Ukraine)	MF	5 March 1958 (aged 25)	Metalist Kharkiv	1976
	Leonid Buryak	(Soviet Union) / (Ukraine)	MF	10 July 1953 (aged 30)	Chornomorets Odesa	1973
	Yaroslav Dumanskyi	(Soviet Union) / (Ukraine)	MF	4 August 1959 (aged 24)	Karpaty Lviv	1981
	Oleksandr Zavarov	(Soviet Union) / (Ukraine)	MF	26 April 1961 (aged 22)	Zaria Voroshilovgrad	1983
	Oleksiy Mykhailychenko	(Soviet Union) / (Ukraine)	MF	30 March 1963 (aged 20)	unknown	1981
	Pavlo Yakovenko	(Soviet Union) / (Ukraine)	MF	19 December 1964 (aged 19)	Metalist Kharkiv	1982
Forwards
	Oleh Blokhin	(Soviet Union) / (Ukraine)	FW	5 November 1952 (aged 31)	Dynamo Kyiv Sports School	1969
res	Volodymyr Veremeyev	(Soviet Union) / (Russia)	FW	8 November 1948 (aged 35)	Zirka Kirovohrad	1968
	Vadym Yevtushenko	(Soviet Union) / (Ukraine)	FW	1 January 1958 (aged 25)	Zirka Kirovohrad	1980
	Viktor Khlus	(Soviet Union) / (Ukraine)	FW	12 February 1958 (aged 25)	Bukovyna Chernivtsi	1980

=== Reserve squad information ===
Squad no.	Name	Nationality	Position	Date of birth (age)	Signed from	Signed in
Goalkeepers
res	Viktor Hryshko	(Soviet Union) / (Ukraine)	GK	2 November 1961 (aged 22)	RVUFK Kyiv	1979
res	Valeriy Palamarchuk	(Soviet Union) / (Ukraine)	GK	11 August 1963 (aged 20)	Dynamo Kyiv Sports School	1981
res	Volodymyr Tsytkin	(Soviet Union) / (Ukraine)	GK	1 August 1966 (aged 17)	unknown	1983
Defenders
res	Yuriy Bakalov	(Soviet Union) / (Ukraine)	DF/MF	16 January 1966 (aged 17)	SDYuShOR Zmina Kyiv	1983
res	Oleh Derevinskyi	(Soviet Union) / (Ukraine)	DF	17 July 1966 (aged 17)	unknown	1983
res	Oleksandr Dyuldin	(Soviet Union) / (Russia)	DF/MF	11 August 1966 (aged 17)	RVUFK Kyiv	1983
res	Oleksandr Isayev	(Soviet Union) / (Ukraine)	DF/MF	8 September 1964 (aged 19)	unknown	1982
res	Vadym Karatayev	(Soviet Union) / (Ukraine)	DF/MF	15 January 1964 (aged 19)	unknown	1980
res	Ruslan Koloskov	(Soviet Union)	DF	3 November 1966 (aged 17)	unknown	1983
res	Yuriy Koshkin	(Soviet Union) / (Ukraine)	DF	8 June 1963 (aged 20)	Dynamo Kyiv Sports School	1982
res	Yuriy Makhynia	(Soviet Union) / (Ukraine)	DF	1 January 1961 (aged 22)	Kolos Poltava	1980
res	Oleksandr Prykhodko	(Soviet Union) / (Ukraine)	DF	11 April 1966 (aged 17)	Dynamo Kyiv Sports School	1983
res	Serhiy Protsyuk	(Soviet Union) / (Ukraine)	DF/MF	7 February 1963 (aged 20)	Dynamo Kyiv Sports School	1981
Midfielders
res	Syarhey Herasimets	(Soviet Union) / (Ukraine)	MF/FW	13 October 1965 (aged 18)	Dynamo Kyiv Sport School	1983
res	Valeriy Kinashenko	(Soviet Union) / (Ukraine)	MF	4 February 1964 (aged 19)	Hungary	1983
res	Yevhen Komkov	(Soviet Union)	MF	14 March 1966 (aged 17)	Dynamo Kyiv Sports School	1983
res	Oleksiy Leonidov	(Soviet Union)	MF	21 April 1966 (aged 17)	unknown	1983
res	Vyacheslav Mazarati	(Soviet Union)	MF	12 January 1963 (aged 20)	unknown	1982
res	Serhiy Raiko	(Soviet Union) / (Ukraine)	MF/FW	2 February 1964 (aged 19)	SKA-Karpaty Lvov	1983
res	Vasyl Rats	(Soviet Union) / (Ukraine)	MF	25 March 1961 (aged 22)	Nyva Vinnytsia	1981
res	Vadym Sorokin	(Soviet Union) / (Ukraine)	MF/FW	13 February 1966 (aged 17)	Dynamo Kyiv Sports School	1983
res	Yuriy Teslia	(Soviet Union)	MF	18 April 1962 (aged 21)	Avanhard Rivno	1983
res	Oleksandr Shlyakhtychenko	(Soviet Union)		12 December 1966 (aged 17)	Dynamo Kyiv Sports School	1983
res	Ihor Yanchuk	(Soviet Union)		27 September 1965 (aged 18)	Dynamo Kyiv Sports School	1982
Forwards
res	Oleksandr Hushchyn	(Soviet Union) / (Ukraine)	FW	5 August 1966 (aged 17)	RVUFK Kyiv	1983
res	Ihor Zherdev	(Soviet Union)	FW	22 January 1963 (aged 20)	Khujand Leninabad	1983
res	Volodymyr Koman	(Soviet Union) / (Ukraine)	FW	20 February 1964 (aged 19)	unknown	1982
res	Yuriy Mykolayenko	(Soviet Union) / (Ukraine)	FW	28 September 1965 (aged 18)	unknown	1983
res	Hryhoriy Pasichnyi	(Soviet Union) / (Ukraine)	FW	2 October 1961 (aged 22)	RVUFK Kyiv	1980
res	Heorhiy Shpatenko	(Soviet Union)	FW	2 July 1966 (aged 17)	Dynamo Kyiv Sports School	1983

== Transfers ==
=== In ===
Date	Pos.	Player	Moving from	Fee	Source
	DF	Vasyl Yevseyev	Zaria Voroshilovgrad		
	MF	Oleksandr Zavarov	Zaria Voroshilovgrad		
	DF	Oleh Kuznetsov	Desna Chernihiv		
	FW	Ihor Zherdev	Khujand Leninabad		
	MF	Yuriy Teslia	Avanhard Rivno		

=== Out ===
Date	Pos.	Player	Moving to	Fee	Source
	FW	Volodymyr Veremeyev	retired		
	MF	Syarhey Herasimets	Dynamo Irpin (loaned)		
	MF	Valeriy Kinashenko	Dynamo Irpin (loaned)		
	DF	Oleh Derevinskyi	Dynamo Irpin (loaned)		
	MF	Vyacheslav Mazarati	Dynamo Irpin (loaned)		
	FW	Ihor Zherdev	Dynamo Irpin (loaned)		
	MF	Yuriy Teslia	Dynamo Irpin		
	FW	Oleksandr Hushchyn	SKA Kyiv (loaned)		
	MF	Yevhen Komkov	SKA Kyiv		
	MF	Oleksiy Leonidov	SKA Kyiv		
	DF/MF	Oleksandr Huyhanov	Tavriya Simferopol		
	DF/MF	Oleksandr Isayev	Tavriya Simferopol		
	DF	Igor Savelev	Tavriya Simferopol		
	MF	Vyacheslav Mazarati	Sudnobudivnyk Mykolaiv		
	GK	Valeriy Palamarchuk	Chornomorets Odesa		
	DF/MF	Oleksandr Sorokalet	Zorya Voroshilovgrad		
	MF/FW	Vadym Sorokin	Nyva Vinnytsia		
	FW	Hryhoriy Pasichnyi	murdered		

== Club management ==
Position	Staff
Managers	(Soviet Union) / (Russia) Yuriy Morozov
Team's chief	(Soviet Union) / (Ukraine) Mykhailo Koman
Assistant managers	(Soviet Union) / (Ukraine) Anatoliy Puzach
Assistant managers	(Soviet Union) / (Ukraine) Mykhailo Fomenko
Goalkeeping coach	the post didn't exist.

Last updated: March 2023
Source: Zenit Dynamo game report

The outgoing manager, Valeriy Lobanovsky, after accepting his appointment to national team, he recommended as his replacement his friend and coach of Zenit Leningrad Yuriy Morozov.

== Pre-season and friendlies ==
Its pre-season training Dynamo was holding at Georgian Gantiadi located on eastern-northern shores of the Black Sea, where they departed on 6 January and with few breaks stayed there until mid of February. On 15 February Dynamo had to dispatch some nine of its better players for the national team friendly with Dinamo Tbilisi. A planned training tour to Yugoslavia before the European Cup quarterfinal with Hamburg was cancelled.

- List of the 1983 Dynamo Kyiv friendlies

	Shakhtar Donetsk	2–1	Dynamo Kyiv
?:?		[ Report]

10 January 1983	Zenit Leningrad	2–4	Dynamo Kyiv	Leselidze
?:?	Zheludkov (?); Kazachyonok (?)	Report	Bezsonov (?); Yevtushenko (?); Zavarov (?)
Note: Vartanian in his chronicles claims it was Dinamo Leningrad rather than Zenit.

16 January 1983	Torpedo Kutaisi	0–4	Dynamo Kyiv	Leselidze
?:?		Report	Blokhin (?); Yevtushenko (?); Buryak (?)

== Competitions ==
=== Overall ===
Competition	First match	Last match	Starting round	Final position	Record							
Competition	First match	Last match	Starting round	Final position	Pld	W	D	L	GF	GA	GD	Win %
Vysshaya Liga	27 March 1983	6 November 1983	Matchday 1	7th	34	14	10	10	50	34	+16	41.18
Cup	11 March 1983		Quarterfinals (1/4)	Quarterfinals (1/4)	1	0	0	1	1	3	−2	0.00
European Cup	2 March 1983	16 March 1983	Quarterfinals (1/4)	Quarterfinals (1/4)	2	1	0	1	2	4	−2	50.00
UEFA Cup	14 September 1983	28 September 1983	First round (1/32)	First round (1/32)	2	0	1	1	0	1	−1	0.00
Total					39	15	11	13	53	42	+11	38.46

Source: Competitions

=== Vysshaya Liga ===
==== League table ====
Pos	Team	Pld	W	D	L	GF	GA	GD	Pts
5	(Lithuanian Soviet Socialist Republic) Žalgiris Vilnius	34	15	9	10	38	36	+2	39
6	(Russian Soviet Federative Socialist Republic) Torpedo Moscow	34	14	11	9	40	34	+6	38 (Note: 1 point deducted (10 draw limit))
7	(Ukrainian Soviet Socialist Republic) Dynamo Kyiv	34	14	10	10	50	34	+16	38
8	(Ukrainian Soviet Socialist Republic) Chornomorets Odessa	34	16	5	13	44	46	−2	37
9	(Ukrainian Soviet Socialist Republic) Shakhtar Donetsk	34	16	5	13	48	40	+8	37

==== Results summary ====
Overall								Home						Away					
Pld	W	D	L	GF	GA	GD	Pts	W	D	L	GF	GA	GD	W	D	L	GF	GA	GD
34	14	10	10	50	34	+16	52	10	5	2	38	12	+26	4	5	8	12	22	−10

==== Results by round ====
Round	1	2	3	4	5	6	7	8	9	10	11	12	13	14	15	16	17	18	19	20
Ground	A	A	A		H	H	A	A	H	H	A	A	H	H	A	A	H		A	A
Result	L	W	L		L	W	D	D	D	W	W	W	D	W	W	W	W		L	W
Position	14	6	15	15	15	13	14	15	14	12	9	7	9	5	7	7	8	7	7	8

Source: 1983 Dynamo season
A = Away; H = Home; W = Win; D = Draw; L = Loss

==== Matches ====
27 March 1983 1	Ararat Yerevan	2–1	Dynamo Kyiv	Yerevan
?:?	Oganesian 22'; Melikyan 49'; Kasaboglian (yellow card)	Report	Buryak 57'	Stadium: Hrazdan Stadium; Attendance: 45,600; Referee: Anatoliy Kadetov (Moscow)

30 March 1983 2	Torpedo Kutaisi	0–1	Dynamo Kyiv	Kutaisi
?:?	Korgalidze (yellow card)	Report	Blokhin 18'; Bal (yellow card)	Stadium: Central Stadium; Attendance: 27,000; Referee: Yuriy Savchenko (Moscow)

2 April 1983 3	Metalist Kharkiv	2–0	Dynamo Kyiv	Kharkiv
?:?	Bernikov 17' (pen.), 61'; Kamarzayev (yellow card)	Report	Sorokalet (yellow card)	Stadium: Metalist Stadium; Attendance: 6,000; Referee: Kirill Doronin (Moscow)

16 April 1983 5	Dynamo Kyiv	0–1	Torpedo Moscow	Kyiv
?:?	Sorokalet (yellow card)	Report	Vasilyev; Petrenko (yellow card)	Stadium: Republican Stadium; Attendance: 46,000; Referee: Romualdas Juška (Vilnius)

19 April 1983 6	Dynamo Kyiv	1–0	CSKA Moscow	Kyiv
?:?	Mykhailychenko 24'; Dumanskyi (yellow card)	Report	Samokhin (yellow card)	Stadium: Republican Stadium; Attendance: 21,500; Referee: Anatoliy Milchenko (Sukhumi)

30 April 1983 7	Žalgiris Vilnius	0–0	Dynamo Kyiv	Vilnius
?:?		Report	Bal (yellow card); Lozynskyi (yellow card)	Stadium: Žalgiris Central Stadium; Attendance: 15,000; Referee: Anatoliy Milchenko (Sukhumi)

2 May 1983 8	Dinamo Minsk	0–0	Dynamo Kyiv	Minsk
?:?	Pudyshev (yellow card); Gotsmanov (yellow card)	Report	Huyhanov (yellow card)	Stadium: Dinamo Stadium; Attendance: 50,050; Referee: Velodi Miminoshvili (Tbilisi)

20 June 1983 9 (postponed)	Dynamo Kyiv	1–1	Shakhtar Donetsk	Kyiv
?:?	Blokhin 72'	Report	Morozov 53'; Pyanykh (yellow card)	Stadium: Republican Stadium; Attendance: 20,000; Referee: Yuriy Savchenko (Moscow)

13 May 1983 10	Dynamo Kyiv	2–1	Dnipro Dnipropetrovsk	Kyiv
?:?	Zavarov 14'; Buryak 37' (pen.)	Report	Kuznetsov 41'	Stadium: Republican Stadium; Attendance: 21,000; Referee: Viktor Abgoltz (Alma-Ata)

5 June 1983 11	Nistru Kishinev	0–1	Dynamo Kyiv	Chișinău
?:?		Report	Yevtushenko 58'; Lozynskyi (yellow card)	Stadium: Republican Stadium; Attendance: 21,800; Referee: Oleg Chichenov (Moscow)

8 June 1983 12	Chornomorets Odesa	1–2	Dynamo Kyiv	Odesa
?:?	Fink 60'	Report	Buryak 9' (pen.); Yevtushenko 55'	Stadium: BSS Central Stadium; Attendance: 38,700; Referee: Yuriy Savchenko (Moscow)

11 June 1983 13	Dynamo Kyiv	1–1	Spartak Moscow	Kyiv
?:?	Zavarov 29'	Report	Mileshkin 53'; Gavrilov (yellow card) 69'	Stadium: Republican Stadium; Attendance: 53,000; Referee: Anatoliy Milchenko (Sukhumi)

16 June 1983 14	Dynamo Kyiv	2–1	Dynamo Moscow	Kyiv
?:?	Dumanskyi 59'	Report	Bulanov 6' (o.g.); Molodtsov 43'	Stadium: Republican Stadium; Attendance: 31,000; Referee: Velodi Miminoshvili (Tbilisi)

24 June 1983 15	Pakhtakor Tashkent	3–0	Dynamo Kyiv	Tashkent
?:?	Yakubik 13'; Belyalov 59'; Zhuravlev 65'	Report		Stadium: Pakhtakor Central Stadium; Attendance: 45,000; Referee: Vladimir Kuznetsov (Omsk)

27 June 1983 16	Zenit Leningrad	1–1	Dynamo Kyiv	Leningrad
?:?	Zheludkov 56'; Broshin (yellow card)	Report	Blokhin 18'; Lozynskyi (yellow card)	Stadium: Kirov Stadium; Attendance: 50,000; Referee: Romualdas Juška (Vilnius)

1 July 1983 17	Dynamo Kyiv	1–1	Dinamo Tbilisi	Kyiv
?:?	Buryak 64' (pen.)	Report	Sulakvelidze 90'	Stadium: Republican Stadium; Attendance: 27,000; Referee: Kirill Doronin (Moscow)

5 July 1983 18	Dynamo Kyiv	0–0	Neftchi Baku	Kyiv
?:?	Savelev (yellow card)	Report	Vahabzade (yellow card)	Stadium: Republican Stadium; Attendance: 14,000; Referee: Yuriy Savchenko (Moscow)

10 July 1983 19	Dynamo Kyiv	2–1	Metalist Kharkiv	Kyiv
?:?	Bezsonov 54'; Buryak 90' (pen.)	Report	Bernikov 40' (pen.); Saakov (yellow card)	Stadium: Republican Stadium; Attendance: 17,800; Referee: Kirill Doronin (Moscow)

18 July 1983 21	Torpedo Moscow	2–1	Dynamo Kyiv	Moscow
19:00	Dozmorov 4', (yellow card); Petrenko 33'	Report	Bal 61'; Zhuravlyov (yellow card)	Stadium: Torpedo Stadium; Attendance: 11,500; Referee: Anatoliy Milchenko (Sukhumi)

21 July 1983 22	CSKA Moscow	4–1	Dynamo Kyiv	Moscow
?:?	Kolyadko 30'; Tarkhanov 60', 72'; Glushakov 79'; Kuznetsov (yellow card)	Report	Zavarov 7'	Stadium: Dynamo Central Stadium; Attendance: 20,100; Referee: Romualdas Juška (Vilnius)

2 August 1983 23	Dynamo Kyiv	4–1	Žalgiris Vilnius	Kyiv
?:?	Dumanskyi 9'; Chernikov 24'; Zavarov 67'; Yevtushenko 77'	Report	Jakubauskas 38'	Stadium: Republican Stadium; Attendance: 26,000; Referee: Anatoliy Milchenko (Sukhumi)

5 August 1983 24	Dynamo Kyiv	0–2	Dinamo Minsk	Kyiv
19:00		Report	Rumbutis 27'; Kondratyev 50'; Yanushevsky (yellow card)	Stadium: Republican Stadium; Attendance: 45,200; Referee: Yuriy Savchenko (Moscow)

9 August 1983 25	Shakhtar Donetsk	1–2	Dynamo Kyiv	Donetsk
?:?	Smolyaninov 60'	Report	Yevtushenko 10', (yellow card); Zavarov 85'; Lozynskyi (yellow card); Bal (yellow card)	Stadium: Shakhtar Central Stadium; Attendance: 40,395; Referee: Vladimir Kuznetsov (Omsk)

21 August 1983 26	Dnepr Dnepropetrovsk	2–1	Dynamo Kyiv	Dnepropetrovsk
?:?	Lytovchenko 39'; Taran 75'	Report	Blokhin 90' (pen.); Kuznetsov (yellow card)	Stadium: Meteor Stadium; Attendance: 34,000; Referee: Valeriy Ageyev (Kostanay)

24 August 1983 27	Dynamo Kyiv	3–0	Nistru Kishinev	Kyiv
?:?	Blokhin 54', 66'; Yevtushenko 85'	Report		Stadium: Republican Stadium; Attendance: 15,400; Referee: Alexey Spirin (Moscow)

29 August 1983 28	Dynamo Kyiv	6–0	Chornomorets Odesa	Kyiv
?:?	Yevtushenko 20', 40', 59'; Demyanenko 76', 89'; Blokhin 87' (pen.)	Report	Psomiadi (yellow card)	Stadium: Republican Stadium; Attendance: 22,400; Referee: Valeri Butenko (Moscow)

1 September 1983 29	Spartak Moscow	0–0	Dynamo Kyiv	Moscow
?:?		Report	Kuznetsov (yellow card)	Stadium: V.I.Lenin Central Stadium; Attendance: 80,000; Referee: Romualdas Juška (Vilnius)

9 September 1983 30	Dynamo Moscow	1–1	Dynamo Kyiv	Moscow
?:?	Gazzayev 75' (pen.)	Report	Chernikov 49', (yellow card)	Stadium: Dynamo Central Stadium; Attendance: 15,200; Referee: Ivan Timoshenko (Rostov-na-Donu)

18 September 1983 31	Dynamo Kyiv	2–0	Pakhtakor Tashkent	Kyiv
19:00	Yevtushenko 30'; Demyanenko 38'	Report		Stadium: Republican Stadium; Attendance: 19,000; Referee: Velodi Miminoshvili (Tbilisi)

23 September 1983 32	Dynamo Kyiv	2–2	Zenit Leningrad	Kyiv
19:00	Yevtushenko 67'; Baltacha 88'	Report	Dmitriyev 19'; Gerasimov 24'	Stadium: Republican Stadium; Attendance: 19,000; Referee: Ivan Timoshenko (Rostov-na-Donu)

15 October 1983 33	Dinamo Tbilisi	1–0	Dynamo Kyiv	Tbilisi
?:?	Chivadze 67'; Sulakvelidze (yellow card)	Report		Stadium: V.I.Lenin Dinamo Stadium; Attendance: 23,300; Referee: Kirill Doronin (Moscow)

23 October 1983 34	Neftchi Baku	2–0	Dynamo Kyiv	Baku
?:?	Ponomaryov 79'; Aliev 81'	Report		Stadium: V.I.Lenin Republican Stadium; Attendance: 16,400; Referee: Yuriy Savchenko (Moscow)

28 October 1983 35	Dynamo Kyiv	3–0	Ararat Yerevan	Kyiv
?:?	Blokhin 55', 77'; Yevtushenko 80', (yellow card)	Report		Stadium: Republican Stadium; Attendance: 11,000; Referee: Valeriy Baskakov (Moscow)

6 November 1983 36	Dynamo Kyiv	8–0	Torpedo Kutaisi	Kyiv
?:?	Zavarov 38', 73', 84'; Mykhailychenko 39', 67'; Khlus 47'; Blokhin 59', 89'	Report		Stadium: Republican Stadium; Attendance: 6,600; Referee: Lev Akselevich (Moscow)

=== Soviet Cup ===
11 March 1983 Quarterfinals (1/4)	Zenit Leningrad	3–1	Dynamo Kyiv	Leningrad
?:?	Klementyev 4', 27'; Kazachyonok 90'; Broshin (yellow card)	Report	Yevtushenko 83'; Olefirenko (yellow card); Lozynskyi (yellow card)	Stadium: V. I. Lenin Sport & Concert Complex; Attendance: 25,000; Referee: Velodi Miminoshvili (Tbilisi)

=== European Cup ===
==== Matches ====
2 March 1983 Quarterfinals (1/4)	Dynamo Kyiv	0–3	Hamburg	Kyiv
19:00		Report	Bastrup 4', 52', 70'; Hrubesch (yellow card) 37'	Stadium: Republican Stadium; Attendance: 27,000; Referee: Enzo Barbaresco (Italy)

16 March 1983 Quarterfinals (1/4)	Hamburg	1–2	Dynamo Kyiv	Hamburg
20:00	Hartwig 61'	Report	Dumanskyi (yellow card) 1'; Bezsonov 52'; Yevtushenko 82'	Stadium: Volksparkstadion; Attendance: 50,000; Referee: Rolf Ericsson (Sweden)
Note: Hamburg won 4–2 on aggregate

=== UEFA Cup ===
==== Matches ====
14 September 1983 First round (1/32)	Dynamo Kyiv	0–0	Laval	Kyiv
18:00	Khlus (yellow card) 89'	Report	Sène (yellow card) 84'	Stadium: Respublykanskyi Stadion; Attendance: 49,800; Referee: Erkan Göksel (Turkey)

28 September 1983 First round (1/32)	Laval	1–0	Dynamo Kyiv	Laval
20:00	Souto 34'	Report	Lozynskyi (yellow card) 34'	Stadium: Stade Francis-Le-Basser; Attendance: 20,000; Referee: Ulrich Nyffenegger (Switzerland)
Note: Laval won 1–0 on aggregate
