= 1967 in association football =

The following are the football (soccer) events of the year 1967 throughout the world.

== Events ==
- January 28 – In the Scottish Cup Berwick Rangers F.C. beat Rangers F.C. 1–0 to cause one of the biggest shock results in Scottish Football.
- European Cup: Celtic F.C. defeat Inter Milan 2–1 at the Estádio Nacional in Lisbon to become the first British and first non-Mediterranean winners of the trophy.
- Copa Libertadores 1967: Won by Racing Club after defeating Nacional on an aggregate score of 2–1.
- Third Lanark A.C., one of the founding members of the Scottish Football League are declared bankrupt and the club is liquidated.
- September 21 – NAC makes a winning European debut by defeating Malta's Floriana (1–2) in the first round of the Cup Winners Cup, with both Dutch goals scored by Jacques Visschers.
- November 19 – Jimmy O'Connor of Shelbourne sets the world record for the fastest ever hat-trick by scoring three goals in 2 minutes 13 seconds in a League of Ireland match against local rivals Bohemians at Dalymount Park, Dublin.

== Winners club national championship ==
=== Asia ===
- Qatar: Al-Oruba

=== Europe ===
- England: Manchester United
- France: Saint-Étienne
- Italy: Juventus
- Netherlands: Ajax Amsterdam
- Scotland: Celtic
- Spain: Real Madrid
- Turkey: Beşiktaş J.K.
- West Germany: Eintracht Braunschweig

=== North America ===
- Mexico: Toluca
- United States / Canada:
  - Los Angeles Wolves (USA)
  - Oakland Clippers (NPSL)

=== South America ===
- Argentina:
  - Estudiantes - Metropolitano
  - Independiente - Nacional
- Brazil:
  - Palmeiras - Taça Brasil
  - Palmeiras - Torneio Roberto Gomes Pedrosa
- Chile: Universidad de Chile
- Paraguay: Club Guaraní

== International tournaments ==
- South American Championship in Montevideo, Uruguay (January 17 – February 2, 1967)
  1. Uruguay
  2. Argentina
  3. Chile
- 1967 British Home Championship (October 22, 1966 – April 15, 1967)

Scotland

- Pan American Games in Winnipeg, Manitoba, Canada (July 24 – August 3, 1967)
  1. Mexico
  2. Bermuda
  3. Trinidad and Tobago
- South Vietnam Independence Cup in Saigon (November 4 – November 14, 1967)
  1. Australia
  2. South Korea
  3. South Vietnam
  4. Malaysia

== Births ==
=== January–April ===
- January 8 – Torsten Gowitzke, German footballer and manager
- January 9 – Claudio Caniggia, Argentinian international footballer
- January 16 – Ivo Ron, Ecuadorian footballer
- January 18 – Pieter Huistra, Dutch footballer
- February 3 – Aurelio Vidmar, Australian footballer
- February 10 – Rini Coolen, Dutch footballer and manager
- February 18 – Roberto Baggio, Italian international footballer
- February 18 – Marco Boogers, Dutch footballer
- February 22
  - Eric de Koeyer, retired Dutch footballer
  - Serghei Stroenco, Moldovan international footballer (died 2013)
- February 26 – Kazuyoshi Miura, Japanese footballer
- March 1 – Aron Winter, Dutch international footballer
- March 3 – Jaime Patricio Ramírez, Chilean footballer
- March 12 – Jorge Dely Valdés, Panamanian footballer
- March 26 – Alberto Coyote, Mexican footballer
- April 7 – Bodo Illgner, German international footballer

=== May–September ===
- May 3 – Daniel Fasel, retired Swiss footballer
- May 11 – Andrés Romero, Chilean footballer
- May 18 – Harald Ebertz, former German footballer
- May 20 – Richard Zambrano, Chilean footballer
- May 21 – Nando, Spanish footballer
- May 25 – Luc Nilis, Belgian footballer
- May 27 – Paul Gascoigne, English footballer
- May 31 – Moustapha Sall, Mauritanian football player and manager (d. 2025)
- June 22 – Marc van Hintum, Dutch footballer
- June 23 – Pavel Yevteyev, Kazakhstani footballer
- July 7 – Shamsurin Abdul Rahman, Malaysian footballer
- July 19 – Gabriel Favale, Argentine football referee
- July 24 – Wojciech Ozimek, Polish former professional footballer
- August 7 – Jocelyn Angloma, French footballer
- August 10 – Philippe Albert, Belgian footballer
- August 24 – Michael Thomas, English footballer
- September 2 – Andreas Möller, German footballer
- September 5 – Matthias Sammer, German footballer
- September 6 – David Patiño, Mexican footballer
- September 12 – Ivan Ondruška, former Slovak footballer
- September 20 – Craig Forrest, Canadian soccer player
- September 27 – Uche Okechukwu, Nigerian footballer

=== October–December ===
- October 11 – Mario Salas, Chilean international footballer
- October 13 – Hernaín Arzú, Honduran international footballer
- October 18 – Greg Allen, English former professional footballer
- October 21 – Paul Ince, English international footballer
- October 24 – Carlos Antonio Muñoz, Ecuadorian footballer (died 1993)
- November 2 – Zvonimir Soldo, Croatian international footballer
- November 18 – Gavin Peacock, English footballer and sportscaster
- November 20 – Anton Brovarnik, Soviet footballer
- November 28 – José del Solar, Peruvian footballer
- December 5 – Bogdan Stelea, Romanian footballer
- December 14 – Palhinha (Jorge Ferreira da Silva), Brazilian international footballer
- December 22 – Şener Kurtulmuş, Turkish former footballer
- December 28 – Paul Foster, Australian footballer

== Deaths ==
=== April ===
- April 1 - Jan van Dort, Dutch international footballer (77)
- April 4 – Héctor Scarone, Uruguayan striker, winner of the 1930 FIFA World Cup and all-time topscorer of the Uruguay national football team between 1930 and 2011. (68)

=== June ===
- June 6 – Fernando Paternoster, Argentine defender, runner-up of the 1930 FIFA World Cup. (64)
