= 1985 FC Dynamo Kyiv season =

Dynamo Kyiv
1985 season
- Manager: Valeriy Lobanovskyi
- Stadium: Republican Stadium
- Soviet Top League: Winners
- Soviet Cup: Round of 16
- European Cup Winners' Cup: Winners
- Top goalscorer: League: Oleg Blokhin (12); All: Oleg Blokhin (18)
- Highest home attendance: 100,000
- Average home league attendance: 35,918
Home colours	Away colours

During the 1985 Soviet football season, Dynamo Kyiv competed in the Soviet Top League. During that season, they won their 11th league title, as well as competing in both the Soviet Cup and European Cup Winners' Cup, winning the latter.

== Squad ==
Squad at the start of season

Note: Flags indicate national team as defined under FIFA eligibility rules; some limited exceptions apply. Players may hold more than one non-FIFA nationality.

No.	Pos.	Nation	Player
—	GK	URS	Anton Brovarnik
—	GK	URS	Viktor Chanov
—	GK	URS	Andriy Kovtun
—	GK	URS	Mykhaylo Mykhaylov
—	DF	URS	Sergei Baltacha
—	DF	URS	Volodymyr Bezsonov
—	DF	URS	Anatoliy Demyanenko (captain)
—	DF	URS	Volodymyr Horilyi
—	DF	URS	Vadym Karatayev
—	DF	URS	Ruslan Kolokolov
—	DF	URS	Oleh Kuznetsov
—	DF	URS	Serhiy Protsyuk

No.	Pos.	Nation	Player
—	MF	URS	Andriy Bal
—	MF	URS	Vadym Yevtushenko
—	MF	URS	Oleksiy Mykhaylychenko
—	MF	URS	Mykhaylo Olefirenko
—	MF	URS	Vasyl Rats
—	MF	URS	Pavlo Yakovenko
—	MF	URS	Ivan Yaremchuk
—	MF	URS	Oleksandr Zavarov
—	FW	URS	Igor Belanov
—	FW	URS	Oleg Blokhin
—	FW	URS	Vasili Evseev
—	FW	URS	Viktor Khlus

== Competitions ==
Competition	First match	Last match	Starting round	Final position	Record							
Competition	First match	Last match	Starting round	Final position	Pld	W	D	L	GF	GA	GD	Win %
Soviet Top League	1 March 1985	23 November 1985	Matchday 1	Winners	34	20	8	6	64	26	+38	58.82
Soviet Cup	13 August 1985	12 September 1985	Round of 32	Round of 16	2	1	1	0	7	5	+2	50.00
European Cup Winners' Cup	18 September 1985	2 May 1986	First Round	Winners	9	6	2	1	26	8	+18	66.67
Total					45	27	11	7	97	39	+58	60.00

Source: Competitions

=== Soviet Top League ===
Pos	Team	Pld	W	D	L	GF	GA	GD	Pts	Qualification or relegation
1	(Ukrainian Soviet Socialist Republic) Dynamo Kyiv (C)	34	20	8	6	64	26	+38	48	Qualification for European Cup first round
2	(Russian Soviet Federative Socialist Republic) Spartak Moscow	34	18	10	6	72	28	+44	46	Qualification for UEFA Cup first round
3	(Ukrainian Soviet Socialist Republic) Dnipro Dnipropetrovsk	34	16	11	7	71	41	+30	42 (Note: 1 point deducted (10 draw limit))	Qualification for UEFA Cup first round
4	(Byelorussian Soviet Socialist Republic) Dinamo Minsk	34	16	9	9	40	31	+9	41	Qualification for UEFA Cup first round
5	(Russian Soviet Federative Socialist Republic) Torpedo Moscow	34	13	10	11	42	40	+2	36	
6	(Russian Soviet Federative Socialist Republic) Zenit Leningrad	34	14	7	13	48	38	+10	35	
7	(Lithuanian Soviet Socialist Republic) Žalgiris Vilnius	34	12	11	11	43	49	−6	34	
8	(Georgian Soviet Socialist Republic) Dinamo Tbilisi	34	11	10	13	34	39	−5	32	
9	(Kazakh Soviet Socialist Republic) Kairat Alma-Ata	34	11	13	10	43	46	−3	32 (Note: 3 points deducted (10 draw limit))	
10	(Ukrainian Soviet Socialist Republic) Metalist Kharkiv	34	12	7	15	39	55	−16	31	
11	(Georgian Soviet Socialist Republic) Torpedo Kutaisi	34	11	9	14	40	51	−11	31	
12	(Ukrainian Soviet Socialist Republic) Shakhtar Donetsk	34	10	12	12	46	45	+1	30 (Note: 2 points deducted (10 draw limit))	
13	(Armenian Soviet Socialist Republic) Ararat Yerevan	34	10	12	12	42	46	−4	30	
14	(Russian Soviet Federative Socialist Republic) Dinamo Moscow	34	11	7	16	37	50	−13	29	
15	(Ukrainian Soviet Socialist Republic) Chornomorets Odessa (O)	34	11	7	16	44	65	−21	29	Qualification for Relegation play-off
16	(Azerbaijan Soviet Socialist Republic) Neftçi Baku (O)	34	9	11	14	30	40	−10	28	Qualification for Relegation play-off
17	(Russian Soviet Federative Socialist Republic) Fakel Voronezh (R)	34	9	9	16	24	45	−21	27	Relegation to First League
18	(Russian Soviet Federative Socialist Republic) SKA Rostov-na-Donu (R)	34	7	7	20	36	60	−24	21	Relegation to First League

Source: rsssf.com
(C) Champions; (O) Play-off winners; (R) Relegated

==== Results summary ====
Overall								Home						Away					
Pld	W	D	L	GF	GA	GD	Pts	W	D	L	GF	GA	GD	W	D	L	GF	GA	GD
34	20	8	6	64	26	+38	68	13	2	2	37	8	+29	7	6	4	27	18	+9

==== Results by round ====
Round	1	2	3	4	5	6	7	8	9	10	11	12	13	14	15	16	17	18	19	20	21	22	23	24	25	26	27	28	29	30	31	32	33	34
Ground	A	A	H	H	H	A	A	H	A	A	H	H	H	A	A	H	H	H	H	A	A	A	A	H	H	H	A	H	A	H	H	A	A	A
Result	D	W	L	W	W	W	W	W	D	W	W	W	D	D	D	W	W	D	L	L	W	W	D	W	W	W	L	W	W	W	W	D	L	L
Position	6	4	9	5	5	3	1	1	1	1	1	1	1	1	1	1	1	1	1	2	1	1	2	2	1	1	2	1	1	1	1	1	1	1

A = Away; H = Home; W = Win; D = Draw; L = Loss

==== Matches ====
1 March 1985 1	Dnipro Dnipropetrovsk	1–1	Dynamo Kyiv	Dnipro
MSK (UTC+3)	Taran 84'		Baltacha (yellow card) 70'; Yevtushenko 73'	Stadium: Meteor Stadium; Attendance: 18,200; Referee: Valeri Butenko

10 March 1985 2	Chornomorets Odesa	0–3	Dynamo Kyiv	Odesa
MSK (UTC+3)	Shariy (red card) 32'		Zavarov 3'; Blokhin 37'; Demyanenko 74'	Stadium: Central Stadium ChMP; Attendance: 19,000; Referee: Kirill Doronin

17 March 1985 3	Dynamo Kyiv	1–2	Torpedo Moscow	Kyiv
MSK (UTC+3)	Blokhin 15' (pen.); Kuznetsov (yellow card)		Petrakov 65'; Kruglov 74' (yellow card)	Stadium: Republican Stadium; Attendance: 31,000; Referee: Anatoliy Milchenko

31 March 1985 4	Dynamo Kyiv	2–0	Metalist Kharkiv	Kyiv
MSD (UTC+4)	Mykhaylychenko 44'; Demyanenko 79'			Stadium: Republican Stadium; Attendance: 19,000; Referee: Vadim Zhuk

5 April 1985 5	Dynamo Kyiv	3–0	Kairat Alma-Ata	Kyiv
MSD (UTC+4)	Rats 56'; Blokhin 60' (pen.); Demyanenko 82'			Stadium: Republican Stadium; Attendance: 20,200; Referee: Alexey Spirin

9 April 1985 6	Shakhtar Donetsk	1–2	Dynamo Kyiv	Donetsk
MSD (UTC+4)	Varnavsky (yellow card) 40'; Kravchenko 84' (pen.)		Belanov 10', 60'	Stadium: Central Stadium (Shakhtar); Attendance: 38,200; Referee: Valeri Butenko

20 April 1985 7	Dynamo Moscow	1–2	Dynamo Kyiv	Moscow
MSD (UTC+4)	Karatayev 80'		Belanov 13' (pen.); Zavarov (yellow card) 40'; Demyanenko 65'	Stadium: Central Dynamo Stadium; Attendance: 4,550; Referee: Vadim Zhuk

6 May 1985 8	Dynamo Kyiv	3–0	Žalgiris Vilnius	Kyiv
MSD (UTC+4)	Belanov 45'; Blokhin 52' (pen.); Mykhaylychenko 90'		Jurkus (yellow card) 52'	Stadium: Republican Stadium; Attendance: 34,600; Referee: Aleksandr Kirillov

14 May 1985 9	SKA Rostov	0–0	Dynamo Kyiv	Rostov-on-Don
MSD (UTC+4)				Stadium: SKA SKVO Stadium; Attendance: 11,500; Referee: Alexey Spirin

18 May 1985 10	Fakel Voronezh	1–3	Dynamo Kyiv	Voronezh
MSD (UTC+4)	Minaev 47'		Zavarov 14'; Belanov 33'; Rats 37'	Stadium: Central Stadium of Trade Unions; Attendance: 36,500; Referee: Romualdas Juška

28 May 1985 11	Dynamo Kyiv	2–0	Spartak Moscow	Kyiv
MSD (UTC+4)	Belanov 12', 51'			Stadium: Republican Stadium; Attendance: 100,000; Referee: Ivan Timoshenko

8 June 1985 12	Dynamo Kyiv	3–1	Zenit Leningrad	Kyiv
MSD (UTC+4)	Zavarov 52', 68'; Rats 64'		Stepanov (yellow card) 36'; Dmitriyev 53'	Stadium: Republican Stadium; Attendance: 53,400; Referee: Kirill Doronin

12 June 1985 13	Dynamo Kyiv	1–1	Dinamo Minsk	Kyiv
MSD (UTC+4)	Demyanenko 55' (pen.); Rats 64'		Kisten 40'; Sokol (yellow card) 62'	Stadium: Republican Stadium; Attendance: 51,000; Referee: Romualdas Juška

16 June 1985 14	Ararat Yerevan	1–1	Dynamo Kyiv	Yerevan
MSD (UTC+4)	Mkhitaryan 76' (pen.)		Bal 59'	Stadium: Hrazdan Stadium; Attendance: 12,800; Referee: Aleksandr Mushkovets

19 June 1985 15	Neftçi Baku	1–1	Dynamo Kyiv	Baku
MSD (UTC+4)	Ponomaryov 31' (pen.)		Rats 39'	Stadium: Vladimir Lenin Stadium; Attendance: 13,000; Referee: Vadim Zhuk

27 June 1985 16	Dynamo Kyiv	2–0	Dinamo Tbilisi	Kyiv
MSD (UTC+4)	Rats 35'; Zavarov 63'			Stadium: Republican Stadium; Attendance: 61,500; Referee: Yuriy Savchenko

30 June 1985 17	Dynamo Kyiv	1–0	Torpedo Kutaisi	Kyiv
MSD (UTC+4)	Demyanenko 25'		Dochia (yellow card) 79'	Stadium: Republican Stadium; Attendance: 21,000; Referee: Vladimir Chekhoev

5 July 1985 18	Dynamo Kyiv	0–0	Dnipro Dnipropetrovsk	Kyiv
MSD (UTC+4)	Kuznetsov (yellow card) 25'			Stadium: Republican Stadium; Attendance: 67,000; Referee: Valeri Butenko

8 July 1985 19	Dynamo Kyiv	0–1	Chornomorets Odesa	Kyiv
MSD (UTC+4)			Pasulko 82'	Stadium: Republican Stadium; Attendance: 21,000; Referee: Aleksandr Khokhryakov

13 July 1985 20	Kairat Alma-Ata	2–1	Dynamo Kyiv	Almaty
MSD (UTC+4)	Dzhumanov (yellow card) 53'; Volgin 75'; Pekhlevanidi 80'		Kuznetsov 74'; Blokhin (yellow card) 79'	Stadium: Central Stadium (Almaty); Attendance: 22,000; Referee: Anatoliy Milchenko

31 July 1985 21	Torpedo Moscow	1–4	Dynamo Kyiv	Moscow
MSD (UTC+4)	Buryak (yellow card) 17'; Redkous 36'		Belanov 13' (pen.); Zavarov 32', 48'; Yakovenko (yellow card) 52'; Yevtushenko 82'; Evseev (yellow card) 87'	Stadium: Torpedo Stadium; Attendance: 13,200; Referee: Viktor Abgolts

10 August 1985 22	Dinamo Minsk	0–2	Dynamo Kyiv	Minsk
MSD (UTC+4)			Yevtushenko 33' (yellow card) 72'; Blokhin 51'	Stadium: Dinamo Stadium; Attendance: 50,050; Referee: Velodi Miminoshvili

21 August 1985 23	Metalist Kharkiv	2–2	Dynamo Kyiv	Kharkiv
MSD (UTC+4)	Lozynskyi 6'; Bondar 30'		Blokhin 62' (pen.), 64'	Stadium: Metalist Stadium; Attendance: 32,000; Referee: Vladimir Chekhoev

31 August 1985 24	Dynamo Kyiv	5–0	Dynamo Moscow	Kyiv
MSD (UTC+4)	Yevtushenko 17'; Blokhin 36', 57', 64'; Zavarov 72'			Stadium: Republican Stadium; Attendance: 37,200; Referee: Aleksandr Khokhryakov

3 September 1985 25	Dynamo Kyiv	2–0	Shakhtar Donetsk	Kyiv
MSD (UTC+4)	Yevtushenko 47'; Yaremchuk 88'		Simonov (yellow card) 30'	Stadium: Republican Stadium; Attendance: 30,000; Referee: Kirill Doronin

8 September 1985 26	Dynamo Kyiv	2–0	Fakel Voronezh	Kyiv
MSD (UTC+4)	Zavarov 29'; Demyanenko 32'		Losev (yellow card) 79'	Stadium: Republican Stadium; Attendance: 13,000; Referee: Vadim Zhuk

28 September 1985 27	Žalgiris Vilnius	1–0	Dynamo Kyiv	Vilnius
MSD (UTC+4)	Baranauskas 39'; Kasparavičius (yellow card) 83'		Zavarov (yellow card) 83'	Stadium: Žalgiris Stadium; Attendance: 8,500; Referee: Aleksandr Kirillov

7 October 1985 28	Dynamo Kyiv	4–2	SKA Rostov	Kyiv
MSK (UTC+3)	Belanov 36', 48'; Baltacha 37'; Yevtushenko 65'		Glushakov 84'; Shinkarev 87'	Stadium: Republican Stadium; Attendance: 23,000; Referee: Alexey Spirin

19 October 1985 29	Spartak Moscow	1–2	Dynamo Kyiv	Moscow
MSK (UTC+3)	Morozov (yellow card) 38'; Cherenkov (yellow card) 44'; Rodionov 90'		Kuznetsov (yellow card) 45'; Yaremchuk 63'; Demyanenko 70'	Stadium: Central Lenin Stadium; Attendance: 42,000; Referee: Aleksandr Khokhryakov

3 November 1985 30	Dynamo Kyiv	4–0	Ararat Yerevan	Kyiv
MSK (UTC+3)	Blokhin 57'; Yevtushenko 70', 90'; Rats 79'			Stadium: Republican Stadium; Attendance: 14,400; Referee: German Galikov

10 November 1985 31	Dynamo Kyiv	2–1	Neftçi Baku	Kyiv
MSK (UTC+3)	Blokhin 40'; Yaremchuk 63'		Akhmedov (yellow card) 29'; Javadov 37'	Stadium: Republican Stadium; Attendance: 13,300; Referee: Vadim Zhuk

15 November 1985 32	Zenit Leningrad	1–1	Dynamo Kyiv	Leningrad
MSK (UTC+3)	Klementyev 54'		Yevtushenko 30'	Stadium: V. I. Lenin Sport & Concert Complex; Attendance: 25,000; Referee: Rustam Ragimov

19 November 1985 33	Dinamo Tbilisi	2–1	Dynamo Kyiv	Tbilisi
MSK (UTC+3)	Svanadze 36'; Guruli 78'		Yevtushenko 80'	Stadium: Lenin Dinamo Stadium; Attendance: 20,000; Referee: Sergei Khusainov

23 November 1985 34	Torpedo Kutaisi	2–1	Dynamo Kyiv	Kutaisi
MSK (UTC+3)	Jorjikashvili 6', 43'; Kvernadze (yellow card)		Payikidze 12' (o.g.); Evseev (yellow card)	Stadium: Central Stadium (Kutaisi); Attendance: 25,000; Referee: Anatoliy Khorlin

=== Soviet Cup ===
13 August 1985 Round of 32	Dynamo Kyiv	4–2	SKA Rostov	Kyiv
MSD (UTC+4)	Yevtushenko 25'; Rats 34'; Yaremchuk 45'; Blokhin 75'		Agashkov 15' (pen.); Andreyev 75'	Stadium: Republican Stadium; Attendance: 26,000; Referee: Yuriy Savchenko

12 September 1985 Round of 16	Spartak Moscow	3–3 (a.e.t.) (4–3 p)	Dynamo Kyiv	Moscow
MSD (UTC+4)	Cherenkov 34' (pen.), 35'; Rodionov 93'; Shavlo (yellow card)		Demyanenko 4'; Yakovenko 57'; Belanov 97'; Bezsonov (yellow card)	Stadium: Central Lenin Stadium; Attendance: 41,000; Referee: Aleksandr Khokhryakov
	Penalties
	Cherenkov (penalty scored); Shavlo (penalty missed); Sochnov (penalty scored); Kuznetsov (penalty scored); Gavrilov (penalty scored)		(penalty scored) Belanov; (penalty scored) Mykhaylychenko; (penalty scored) Demyanenko; (penalty missed) Yakovenko; (penalty missed) Yaremchuk

=== European Cup Winners' Cup ===
==== First round ====
18 September 1985 First leg	Utrecht (Netherlands)	2–1	(Soviet Union) Dynamo Kyiv	Utrecht
21:00 MSD (UTC+4)	Kruys 40' (yellow card) 67' van Loen 63'	Report	Bezsonov (yellow card) 54'; Zavarov (yellow card) 79'; Demyanenko 82'	Stadium: Stadion Nieuw Galgenwaard; Attendance: 16,500; Referee: Raul Nazaré (Portugal)

2 October 1996 Second leg	Dynamo Kyiv (Soviet Union)	4–1 (5–3 agg.)	(Netherlands) Utrecht	Kyiv
19:00 MSK (UTC+3)	Blokhin 10'; Yaremchuk 20'; Zavarov 55'; Yevtushenko 60'	Report	de Kruijk 8'; Godee (yellow card) 47'	Stadium: Republican Stadium; Attendance: 94,720; Referee: Talat Tokat (Turkey)

==== Second round ====
23 October 1985 First leg	Universitatea Craiova (Romania)	2–2	(Soviet Union) Dynamo Kyiv	Craiova
15:00 MSK (UTC+3)	Bâcu 13', 81' (pen.)	Report	Zavarov 17', 23'; Bezsonov (yellow card) 32'	Stadium: Stadionul Central; Attendance: 27,796; Referee: Yordan Zhezhov (Bulgaria)

6 November 1985 Second leg	Dynamo Kyiv (Soviet Union)	3–0 (5–2 agg.)	(Romania) Universitatea Craiova	Kyiv
19:00 MSK (UTC+3)	Rats 7'; Belanov 11'; Demyanenko 13'; Zavarov (yellow card) 54'	Report	Popescu (yellow card) 23'; Badea (yellow card) 76'; Mănăilă (yellow card) 85'	Stadium: Republican Stadium; Attendance: 100,062; Referee: Lajos Németh (Hungary)

==== Quarter-finals ====
5 March 1986 First leg	Rapid Wien (Austria)	1–4	(Soviet Union) Dynamo Kyiv	Vienna
22:00 MSK (UTC+3)	Lainer (yellow card) 52'; Willfurth 84'	Report	Belanov (yellow card) 4' (goal) 55', 61'; Demyanenko (yellow card) 10'; Rats 68'; Yakovenko 74'	Stadium: Gerhard Hanappi Stadium; Attendance: 13,000; Referee: Michel Vautrot (France)

19 March 1986 Second leg	Dynamo Kyiv (Soviet Union)	5–1 (9–2 agg.)	(Austria) Rapid Wien	Kyiv
19:00 MSK (UTC+3)	Yaremchuk 7', 32'; Belanov 12' (pen.); Blokhin 43'; Yevtushenko 79'	Report	Stadler (yellow card) 14'; Halilović 27'; Weinhofer (yellow card) 86'	Stadium: Republican Stadium; Attendance: 95,010; Referee: Ronald Bridges (Wales)

==== Semi-finals ====
2 April 1986 First leg	Dynamo Kyiv (Soviet Union)	3–0	(Czechoslovakia) Dukla Prague	Kyiv
19:00 MSD (UTC+4)	Blokhin 7', 37'; Zavarov 35'; Bezsonov (yellow card) 70'	Report	Vízek (yellow card) 33'; Novák (yellow card) 57'	Stadium: Republican Stadium; Attendance: 90,000; Referee: José Rosa dos Santos (Portugal)

16 April 1986 Second leg	Dukla Prague (Czechoslovakia)	1–1 (1–4 agg.)	(Soviet Union) Dynamo Kyiv	Prague
19:00 MSD (UTC+4)	Laušman (yellow card) 60'; Kříž 71'; Korejčík (yellow card) 72'	Report	Belanov 63' (pen.)	Stadium: Stadion Juliska; Attendance: 14,665; Referee: Ioan Igna (Romania)

==== Final ====
2 May 1986 Final	Dynamo Kyiv (Soviet Union)	3–0	(Spain) Atlético Madrid	Lyon
22:15 MSD (UTC+4)	Zavarov 5'; Blokhin 85'; Yevtushenko 88'	Report	Landáburu (yellow card) 16'	Stadium: Stade de Gerland; Attendance: 39,300; Referee: Franz Wöhrer (Austria)
