= 1985 Soviet Top League =

48th season of top-tier football league in Soviet Union

Soviet Top League
- Season: 1985
- Dates: 1 March – 23 November 27 November – 15 December (relegation tournament)
- Champions: FC Dynamo Kyiv
- Relegated: FC Fakel Voronezh, FC SKA Rostov-na-Donu
- European Cup: Dynamo Kyiv
- Cup Winners' Cup: Torpedo Moscow
- UEFA Cup: FC Dinamo Minsk; Spartak Moscow; Dnipro Dnipropetrovsk
- Matches: 306
- Goals: 795 (2.6 per match)
- Top goalscorer: (35) Oleh Protasov (Dnipro Dnipropetrovsk)

The 1985 Soviet Top League was the 16th season of the Soviet Top League, the highest tier football league in the Soviet Union. It also was 48th season of the top tier club competition. Zenit Leningrad were the defending champions.

== Teams ==
=== Promoted teams ===
- FC Fakel Voronezh – champion (returning for the first time since 1961 after twenty 24 seasons, known as Trud Voronezh)
- FC Torpedo Kutaisi – 2nd place (returning after a season)

=== Location ===
Locations of teams in the 1989 Top League

== Final table ==
Pos	Team	Pld	W	D	L	GF	GA	GD	Pts	Qualification or relegation
1	(Ukrainian Soviet Socialist Republic) Dynamo Kyiv (C)	34	20	8	6	64	26	+38	48	Qualification for European Cup first round
2	(Russian Soviet Federative Socialist Republic) Spartak Moscow	34	18	10	6	72	28	+44	46	Qualification for UEFA Cup first round
3	(Ukrainian Soviet Socialist Republic) Dnipro Dnipropetrovsk	34	16	11	7	71	41	+30	42 (Note: 1 point deducted (10 draw limit))	Qualification for UEFA Cup first round
4	(Byelorussian Soviet Socialist Republic) Dinamo Minsk	34	16	9	9	40	31	+9	41	Qualification for UEFA Cup first round
5	(Russian Soviet Federative Socialist Republic) Torpedo Moscow	34	13	10	11	42	40	+2	36	
6	(Russian Soviet Federative Socialist Republic) Zenit Leningrad	34	14	7	13	48	38	+10	35	
7	(Lithuanian Soviet Socialist Republic) Žalgiris Vilnius	34	12	11	11	43	49	−6	34	
8	(Georgian Soviet Socialist Republic) Dinamo Tbilisi	34	11	10	13	34	39	−5	32	
9	(Kazakh Soviet Socialist Republic) Kairat Alma-Ata	34	11	13	10	43	46	−3	32 (Note: 3 points deducted (10 draw limit))	
10	(Ukrainian Soviet Socialist Republic) Metalist Kharkiv	34	12	7	15	39	55	−16	31	
11	(Georgian Soviet Socialist Republic) Torpedo Kutaisi	34	11	9	14	40	51	−11	31	
12	(Ukrainian Soviet Socialist Republic) Shakhtar Donetsk	34	10	12	12	46	45	+1	30 (Note: 2 points deducted (10 draw limit))	
13	(Armenian Soviet Socialist Republic) Ararat Yerevan	34	10	12	12	42	46	−4	30	
14	(Russian Soviet Federative Socialist Republic) Dinamo Moscow	34	11	7	16	37	50	−13	29	
15	(Ukrainian Soviet Socialist Republic) Chornomorets Odessa (O)	34	11	7	16	44	65	−21	29	Qualification for Relegation play-off
16	(Azerbaijan Soviet Socialist Republic) Neftçi Baku (O)	34	9	11	14	30	40	−10	28	Qualification for Relegation play-off
17	(Russian Soviet Federative Socialist Republic) Fakel Voronezh (R)	34	9	9	16	24	45	−21	27	Relegation to First League
18	(Russian Soviet Federative Socialist Republic) SKA Rostov-na-Donu (R)	34	7	7	20	36	60	−24	21	Relegation to First League

Source: rsssf.com
(C) Champions; (O) Play-off winners; (R) Relegated

== Post-season promotion/relegation tournament ==
- For the following season the League was reduced to 16 members. The teams that finished 15th and 16th played a mini-tournament in format of home-away double round-robin with the two best out of the Soviet First League (Daugava Riga and CSKA Moscow). Out of this tournament the two best teams (Chernomorets Odessa and Nefchi Baku) continued on in the Soviet Top League. The tournament was conducted in winter-like conditions from 27 November to 15 December.

Pos	Team	Pld	W	D	L	GF	GA	GD	Pts
1	(Ukrainian Soviet Socialist Republic) Chornomorets Odessa	6	3	3	0	6	3	+3	9
2	(Azerbaijan Soviet Socialist Republic) Neftçi Baku	6	2	3	1	9	4	+5	7
3	(Latvian Soviet Socialist Republic) Daugava Riga	6	1	3	2	7	7	0	5
4	(Russian Soviet Federative Socialist Republic) CSKA Moscow	6	1	1	4	3	11	−8	3

Source: rsssf.com
- For the 1986 season there was no promotion out of the Soviet First League.

== Results ==
Home \ Away	ARA	CHO	DNI	DYK	DMN	DYN	DTB	FAK	KAI	MKH	NEF	SHA	SKA	SPA	TKU	TOR	ŽAL	ZEN
Ararat Yerevan		1–2	3–5	1–1	1–0	1–1	1–0	3–0	4–2	3–1	0–0	3–3	2–0	0–0	3–1	2–1	3–3	1–0
Chornomorets Odessa	2–1		2–1	0–3	0–2	2–0	1–1	2–1	0–1	4–3	1–1	3–2	1–3	1–4	3–0	3–2	2–3	0–0
Dnipro	2–0	3–3		1–1	1–0	2–0	2–1	6–0	4–3	1–0	4–0	5–4	2–0	0–0	2–0	3–3	5–0	2–1
Dynamo Kyiv	4–0	0–1	0–0		1–1	5–0	2–0	2–0	3–0	2–0	2–1	2–0	4–2	2–0	1–0	1–2	3–0	3–1
Dinamo Minsk	3–2	4–1	2–1	0–2		1–0	3–0	2–1	1–1	2–1	2–0	1–1	3–0	2–0	2–1	0–0	0–1	0–0
Dynamo Moscow	1–1	3–1	1–1	1–2	0–1		1–0	0–0	1–0	2–1	0–1	2–0	3–4	2–0	1–3	1–2	0–1	2–3
Dinamo Tbilisi	0–0	3–3	1–1	2–1	0–1	2–1		0–0	2–1	3–1	2–1	5–0	2–1	2–1	2–0	0–0	1–1	1–0
Fakel Voronezh	1–0	1–1	0–2	1–3	2–1	0–1	0–0		1–1	2–0	1–0	1–1	2–0	0–5	2–0	1–0	1–1	0–0
Kairat Alma-Ata	2–0	2–1	1–1	2–1	2–0	0–0	0–0	2–2		1–1	1–0	2–1	1–0	4–4	4–1	1–1	2–0	2–1
Metalist Kharkiv	2–1	2–1	2–1	2–2	1–1	0–1	1–0	1–0	3–0		1–1	1–0	2–0	0–7	3–1	1–0	2–1	1–0
Neftçi Baku	1–0	1–0	1–1	1–1	0–1	0–0	1–0	1–0	4–1	0–0		0–0	1–2	2–2	3–1	1–1	1–0	2–1
Shakhtar Donetsk	0–0	4–0	1–1	1–2	3–0	1–1	2–1	0–1	2–1	2–1	1–1		3–1	1–2	1–1	2–1	0–0	1–0
SKA Rostov-na-Donu	0–1	1–2	1–1	0–0	0–1	1–2	6–2	1–2	1–1	1–1	2–1	1–3		0–2	1–1	1–1	1–3	1–0
Spartak Moscow	0–0	6–0	3–0	1–2	3–0	5–1	0–0	2–0	1–1	4–1	2–0	1–1	3–0		0–0	1–0	4–1	2–0
Torpedo Kutaisi	1–1	2–0	4–3	2–1	1–1	2–1	1–0	1–0	1–0	4–1	2–1	1–4	0–0	1–2		1–2	1–1	1–1
Torpedo Moscow	2–1	0–0	0–3	1–4	0–0	1–2	2–0	2–0	1–1	2–0	3–0	0–0	2–0	2–1	0–2		3–2	1–3
Žalgiris Vilnius	4–1	1–0	1–0	1–0	1–1	1–5	0–1	2–1	0–0	1–1	2–1	1–0	5–1	1–1	2–2	1–2		0–0
Zenit Leningrad	1–1	3–1	2–1	1–1	3–1	2–0	3–0	2–0	3–0	4–1	3–1	2–1	1–3	1–4	2–0	1–2	3–1	

Legend: Blue = home team win; Yellow = draw; Red = away team win.

== Top scorers ==
35 goals

- Oleh Protasov (Dnipro)

14 goals

- Vladimir Klementyev (Zenit)
- Sergey Rodionov (Spartak Moscow)

13 goals

- Fyodor Cherenkov (Spartak Moscow)
- Oleh Taran (Dnipro)

12 goals

- Oleg Blokhin (Dynamo Kyiv)
- Viktor Grachyov (Shakhtar)
- Sigitas Jakubauskas (Žalgiris)

11 goals

- Georgi Kondratyev (Dinamo Minsk)
- Sergei Volgin (Kairat)

== Medal squads ==
(league appearances and goals listed in brackets)

1. FC Dynamo Kyiv

Goalkeepers: Mykhaylo Mykhaylov (34), Viktor Chanov (1).
Defenders: Anatoliy Demyanenko (34 / 8), Oleh Kuznetsov (29 / 1), Sergei Baltacha (26 / 1), Volodymyr Bezsonov (25), Vasyl Yevseyev (19), Ivan Palamar (2), Mykhaylo Olefirenko (1), Vadym Karatayev (1).
Midfielders: Vasyl Rats (34 / 6), Ivan Yaremchuk (33 / 3), Oleksandr Zavarov (31 / 9), Andriy Bal (31 / 1), Pavlo Yakovenko (29), Oleksiy Mykhaylychenko (20 / 2).
Forwards: Ihor Belanov (31 / 10), Oleg Blokhin (29 / 12), Vadym Yevtushenko (22 / 10), Oleksandr Hushchyn (2), Viktor Khlus (2).

Manager: Valeriy Lobanovskyi.

Transferred out during the season: Viktor Khlus (to FC Chornomorets Odesa).

2. FC Spartak Moscow

Goalkeepers: Rinat Dasayev (34), Stanislav Cherchesov (2).
Defenders: Aleksandr Bubnov (34), Boris Kuznetsov (34), Gennady Morozov (31 / 1), Vladimir Sochnov (24 / 2), Almir Kayumov (14), Aleksandr Shibayev (4).
Midfielders: Fyodor Cherenkov (33 / 13), Yevgeni Kuznetsov (33 / 7), Sergei Novikov (31 / 7), Yuri Gavrilov (26 / 6), Sergey Shavlo (25 / 6), Yevgeni Sidorov (24 / 4), Guram Adzhoyev (7 / 1).
Forwards: Sergey Rodionov (29 / 14), Andrei Rudakov (23 / 8), Vladimir Kapustin (13 / 1), Mikhail Rusyayev (5 / 2), Oleg Kuzhlev (5).

Manager: Konstantin Beskov.

Transferred out during the season: none.

3. FC Dnipro Dnipropetrovsk

Goalkeepers: Serhiy Krakovskyi (32), Valeriy Horodov (6).
Defenders: Serhiy Puchkov (32 / 1), Oleksandr Lysenko (31 / 2), Ivan Vyshnevskyi (31), Sergei Bashkirov (29 / 1), Oleksandr Sorokalet (11), Sergey Kulinich (3), Anatoliy Nazarenko (3), Volodymyr Gerashchenko (2), Petro Kutuzov (2), Ihor Deli (1).
Midfielders: Hennadiy Lytovchenko (34 / 7), Vyktor Kuznetsov (33 / 3), Oleksiy Cherednyk (28 / 1), Andriy Dilay (27), Volodymyr Bahmut (20 / 1), Borys Shurshin (12 / 2), Mykola Kudrytsky (9), Serhiy Khudozhylov (2), Mykola Fedorenko (1).
Forwards: Oleh Protasov (33 / 35), Oleh Taran (27 / 13), Volodymyr Lyutyi (22 / 4), Volodymyr Mozolyuk (1), Andriy Sydelnykov (1).

Manager: Volodymyr Yemets.

Transferred out during the season: Serhiy Khudozhylov, Mykola Fedorenko (both to FC Kolos Nikopol).

== Number of teams by union republic ==
Rank	Union republic	Number of teams	Club(s)
1	RSFSR	6	Dinamo Moscow, Fakel Voronezh, SKA Rostov-na-Donu, Spartak Moscow, Torpedo Moscow, Zenit Leningrad
2	Ukrainian SSR	5	Chernomorets Odessa, Dinamo Kiev, Dnepr Dnepropetrovsk, Metallist Kharkov, Shakhter Donetsk
3	Georgian SSR	2	Dinamo Tbilisi, Torpedo Kutaisi
4	Armenian SSR	1	Ararat Yerevan
4	Azerbaijan SSR	1	Neftchi Baku
4	Belarusian SSR	1	Dinamo Minsk
4	Kazakh SSR	1	Kairat Alma-Ata
4	Lithuanian SSR	1	Zhalgiris Vilnius

== Attendances ==
#	Football club	Home games	Average attendance
1	Dinamo Tbilisi	17	54,429
2	Dynamo Kyiv	17	35,918
3	Torpedo Kutaisi	17	26,765
4	Ararat Yerevan	17	26,659
5	Fakel Voronezh	17	25,676
6	FC Dnipro	17	25,506
7	FC Spartak Moscow	17	25,159
8	FC Zenit	17	24,882
9	FC Dinamo Minsk	17	24,435
10	Shakhtar Donetsk	17	21,688
11	Metalist Kharkiv	17	19,324
12	Chornomorets Odesa	17	17,371
13	FC Kairat	17	16,424
14	Neftçi	17	11,388
15	SKA Rostov-on-Don	17	9,771
16	FC Dynamo Moscow	17	9,129
17	FK Žalgiris	17	8,171
18	FC Torpedo Moscow	17	5,776
