= 1985 in Soviet football =

Football in the Soviet Union
- Season: 1985

Men's football
- Top League: Dinamo Kiev
- First League: Daugava Riga
- Second League: Dinamo Briansk (Group 1); Zvezda Perm (Group 2); Rostselmash Rostov-na-Donu (Group 3); Geolog Tyumen (Group 4); Atlantas Klapeida (Group 5); Tavriya Simferopol (Group 6); Sokhibkor Khalkabad (Group 7); Meliorator Chimkent (Group 8); Mertskhali Makharadze (Group 9)
- Soviet Cup: Dinamo Kiev

The 1985 Soviet football championship was the 54th seasons of competitive football in the Soviet Union. Dinamo Kiev won the Top League championship becoming the Soviet domestic champions for the eleventh time.

== Honours ==
Competition		Winner	Runner-up
Top League		Dinamo Kiev (11)	Spartak Moscow
First League		Daugava Riga (1)	CSKA Moscow
Second League	Group 1	Dinamo Briansk	Zorkiy Krasnogorsk
Second League	Group 2	Zvezda Perm	Uralmash Sverdlovsk
Second League	Group 3	Rostselmash Rostov-na-Donu	Spartak Nalchik
Second League	Group 4	Geolog Tyumen	Zvezda Irkutsk
Second League	Group 5	Atlantas Klapeida	Metallurg Lipetsk
Second League	Group 6	Tavriya Simferopol	Niva Vinnitsa
Second League	Group 7	Sokhibkor Khalkabad	Neftyanik Fergana
Second League	Group 8	Meliorator Chimkent	Tselinnik Telinograd
Second League	Group 9	Mertskhali Makharadze	Kiapaz Kirovobad
Soviet Cup		Dinamo Kiev (7)	Shakhter Donetsk

Notes = Number in parentheses is the times that club has won that honour. * indicates new record for competition

== Soviet Union football championship ==
=== Top League ===
Pos	Team	Pld	W	D	L	GF	GA	GD	Pts	Qualification or relegation
1	(Ukrainian Soviet Socialist Republic) Dynamo Kyiv (C)	34	20	8	6	64	26	+38	48	Qualification for European Cup first round
2	(Russian Soviet Federative Socialist Republic) Spartak Moscow	34	18	10	6	72	28	+44	46	Qualification for UEFA Cup first round
3	(Ukrainian Soviet Socialist Republic) Dnipro Dnipropetrovsk	34	16	11	7	71	41	+30	42 (Note: 1 point deducted (10 draw limit))	Qualification for UEFA Cup first round
4	(Byelorussian Soviet Socialist Republic) Dinamo Minsk	34	16	9	9	40	31	+9	41	Qualification for UEFA Cup first round
5	(Russian Soviet Federative Socialist Republic) Torpedo Moscow	34	13	10	11	42	40	+2	36	Qualification for CWC first round
6	(Russian Soviet Federative Socialist Republic) Zenit Leningrad	34	14	7	13	48	38	+10	35	
7	(Lithuanian Soviet Socialist Republic) Žalgiris Vilnius	34	12	11	11	43	49	−6	34	
8	(Georgian Soviet Socialist Republic) Dinamo Tbilisi	34	11	10	13	34	39	−5	32	
9	(Kazakh Soviet Socialist Republic) Kairat Alma-Ata	34	11	13	10	43	46	−3	32 (Note: 3 points deducted (10 draw limit))	
10	(Ukrainian Soviet Socialist Republic) Metalist Kharkiv	34	12	7	15	39	55	−16	31	
11	(Georgian Soviet Socialist Republic) Torpedo Kutaisi	34	11	9	14	40	51	−11	31	
12	(Ukrainian Soviet Socialist Republic) Shakhtar Donetsk	34	10	12	12	46	45	+1	30 (Note: 2 points deducted (10 draw limit))	
13	(Armenian Soviet Socialist Republic) Ararat Yerevan	34	10	12	12	42	46	−4	30	
14	(Russian Soviet Federative Socialist Republic) Dinamo Moscow	34	11	7	16	37	50	−13	29	
15	(Ukrainian Soviet Socialist Republic) Chornomorets Odessa (O)	34	11	7	16	44	65	−21	29	Qualification for Relegation play-off
16	(Azerbaijan Soviet Socialist Republic) Neftçi Baku (O)	34	9	11	14	30	40	−10	28	Qualification for Relegation play-off
17	(Russian Soviet Federative Socialist Republic) Fakel Voronezh (R)	34	9	9	16	24	45	−21	27	Relegation to First League
18	(Russian Soviet Federative Socialist Republic) SKA Rostov-na-Donu (R)	34	7	7	20	36	60	−24	21	Relegation to First League

Source: rsssf.com
(C) Champions; (O) Play-off winners; (R) Relegated
Notes:
- For the following season the League was reduced to 16 members. The teams that finished 15th and 16th played a mini-tournament with the two best out of the Soviet First League. Out of this tournament the two best teams continued on in the Soviet Top League.

Pos	Team	Pld	W	D	L	GF	GA	GD	Pts
1	(Ukrainian Soviet Socialist Republic) Chornomorets Odessa	6	3	3	0	6	3	+3	9
2	(Azerbaijan Soviet Socialist Republic) Neftçi Baku	6	2	3	1	9	4	+5	7
3	(Latvian Soviet Socialist Republic) Daugava Riga	6	1	3	2	7	7	0	5
4	(Russian Soviet Federative Socialist Republic) CSKA Moscow	6	1	1	4	3	11	−8	3

Source: rsssf.com
- For the 1986 season there was no promotion out of the Soviet First League.

=== First League ===
==== For places 1–12 ====
Pos	Team	Pld	W	D	L	GF	GA	GD	Pts	Qualification
1	(Latvian Soviet Socialist Republic) Daugava Riga	42	24	12	6	78	35	+43	60	Qualification for Promotion play-off
2	(Russian Soviet Federative Socialist Republic) CSKA Moscow	42	21	14	7	81	37	+44	54 (Note: There was a draw limit of no more than 12. Only twelve draws earn a point, in contrast, over the limit draws earn no points.)	Qualification for Promotion play-off
3	(Ukrainian Soviet Socialist Republic) SKA Karpaty Lvov	42	21	13	8	66	44	+22	54	
4	(Tajik Soviet Socialist Republic) Pamir Dushanbe	42	21	10	11	59	41	+18	52	
5	(Ukrainian Soviet Socialist Republic) Kolos Nikopol	42	20	6	16	52	55	−3	46	
6	(Russian Soviet Federative Socialist Republic) Lokomotiv Moscow	42	16	11	15	52	51	+1	43	
7	(Russian Soviet Federative Socialist Republic) Shinnik Yaroslavl	42	15	14	13	51	53	−2	42	
8	(Russian Soviet Federative Socialist Republic) Rotor Volgograd	42	15	12	15	61	56	+5	42	
9	(Russian Soviet Federative Socialist Republic) SKA Khabarovsk	42	16	9	17	56	68	−12	41	
10	(Armenian Soviet Socialist Republic) Kotayk Abovyan	42	16	5	21	54	65	−11	37	
11	(Georgian Soviet Socialist Republic) Dinamo Batumi	42	13	9	20	56	71	−15	35	
12	(Russian Soviet Federative Socialist Republic) Dynamo Stavropol	42	13	7	22	35	54	−19	33	

==== For places 13–22 ====
Pos	Team	Pld	W	D	L	GF	GA	GD	Pts	Relegation
13	(Ukrainian Soviet Socialist Republic) Metallurg Zaporozhia	38	16	8	14	49	52	−3	40	
14	(Uzbek Soviet Socialist Republic) Pakhtakor Tashkent	38	14	13	11	48	38	+10	40 (Note: There was a draw limit of no more than 12. Only twelve draws earn a point, in contrast, over the limit draws earn no points.)	
15	(Russian Soviet Federative Socialist Republic) Kuzbass Kemerevo	38	17	5	16	62	52	+10	39	
16	(Russian Soviet Federative Socialist Republic) Spartak Ordjonikidze	38	17	4	17	49	52	−3	38	
17	(Georgian Soviet Socialist Republic) Guria Lanchkhuti	38	15	7	16	50	52	−2	37	
18	(Russian Soviet Federative Socialist Republic) Kuban Krasnodar	38	13	8	17	51	50	+1	34	
19	(Moldavian Soviet Socialist Republic) Nistru Kishinev	38	12	8	18	38	54	−16	32	
20	(Russian Soviet Federative Socialist Republic) Krylya Sovetov Kuybyshev (R)	38	10	13	15	36	42	−6	32	Qualification for Relegation play-off
21	(Russian Soviet Federative Socialist Republic) Iskra Smolensk (O)	38	8	8	22	27	48	−21	24	Qualification for Relegation play-off
22	(Uzbek Soviet Socialist Republic) Zvezda Dzhizak (R)	38	7	8	23	37	78	−41	22	Qualification for Relegation play-off

(O) Play-off winners; (R) Relegated

==== Playoffs ====
Group A

Pos	Team	Pld	W	D	L	GF	GA	GD	Pts	ROS	TAV	ZVZ	SOX
1	(Russian Soviet Federative Socialist Republic) Rostselmash Rostov-on-Don (P)	6	5	0	1	14	4	+10	10		1–0	5–0	2–0
2	(Ukrainian Soviet Socialist Republic) Tavriya Simferopol	6	3	1	2	11	7	+4	7	2–1		4–1	4–2
3	(Uzbek Soviet Socialist Republic) Zvezda Dzhizak (R)	6	3	0	3	8	15	−7	6	1–3	2–1		3–2
4	(Uzbek Soviet Socialist Republic) Soxibkor Khalkabad	6	0	1	5	5	12	−7	1	1–2	0–0	0–1	

(P) Promoted; (R) Relegated

Group B

Pos	Team	Pld	W	D	L	GF	GA	GD	Pts	ATL	ZVZ	MER	KRY
1	(Lithuanian Soviet Socialist Republic) Atlantas Klaipeda (P)	6	4	1	1	9	6	+3	9		2–1	3–1	2–1
2	(Russian Soviet Federative Socialist Republic) Zvezda Perm	6	3	1	2	8	5	+3	7	2–0		3–0	1–0
3	(Georgian Soviet Socialist Republic) Mertskhali Makharadze	6	2	2	2	7	9	−2	6	1–1	2–0		2–2
4	(Russian Soviet Federative Socialist Republic) Krylya Sovetov Kuibyshev (R)	6	0	2	4	4	8	−4	2	0–1	1–1	0–1	

(P) Promoted; (R) Relegated

Group V

Pos	Team	Pld	W	D	L	GF	GA	GD	Pts	ISK	MEL	GEO	DYN
1	(Russian Soviet Federative Socialist Republic) Iskra Smolensk	6	5	1	0	10	2	+8	11		2–0	2–1	2–0
2	(Kazakh Soviet Socialist Republic) Meliorator Chimkent	6	3	1	2	12	8	+4	7	0–1		2–0	5–1
3	(Russian Soviet Federative Socialist Republic) Geolog Tyumen	6	1	2	3	8	10	−2	4	0–0	1–2		4–2
4	(Russian Soviet Federative Socialist Republic) Dynamo Bryansk	6	0	2	4	9	19	−10	2	1–3	3–3	2–2	

=== Second League ===
==== Group 1 ====
Pos	Team	Pld	W	D	L	GF	GA	GD	Pts
1	Dinamo Bryansk	32	23	5	4	73	30	+43	51
2	Zorkiy Krasnogorsk	32	18	10	4	56	26	+30	46
3	Znamya Truda Orekhovo-Zuyevo	32	16	11	5	67	34	+33	43
4	Arsenal Tula	32	15	12	5	50	34	+16	42
5	Zarya Kaluga	32	17	7	8	58	31	+27	41
6	Textilshchik Ivanovo	32	16	7	9	49	33	+16	39
7	Krasnaya Presnya Moskva	32	16	6	10	47	28	+19	38
8	Spartak Kostroma	32	14	10	8	40	27	+13	38
9	Dinamo Vologda	32	15	7	10	55	41	+14	37
10	Stroitel Cherepovets	32	13	3	16	39	44	−5	29
11	Spartak Ryazan	32	8	11	13	28	40	−12	27
12	FSM Moskva	32	7	10	15	32	56	−24	24
13	Torpedo Vladimir	32	7	8	17	23	53	−30	22
14	Saturn Rybinsk	32	7	7	18	29	48	−19	21
15	Dinamo Kashira	32	5	11	16	31	57	−26	21
16	Volzhanin Kineshma	32	4	5	23	31	72	−41	13
17	Volga Kalinin	32	5	2	25	15	69	−54	12

==== Group 2 ====
Pos	Team	Pld	W	D	L	GF	GA	GD	Pts
1	Zvezda Perm	28	19	5	4	41	20	+21	43
2	UralMash Sverdlovsk	28	15	8	5	40	21	+19	38
3	Dinamo Kirov	28	15	6	7	41	28	+13	36
4	Uralets Nizhniy Tagil	28	15	5	8	41	22	+19	35
5	Metallurg Magnitogorsk	28	14	7	7	49	25	+24	35
6	Gastello Ufa	28	14	5	9	40	35	+5	33
7	Rubin Kazan	28	13	4	11	34	32	+2	30
8	Lokomotiv Chelyabinsk	28	10	7	11	44	51	−7	27
9	Svetotekhnika Saransk	28	11	4	13	36	41	−5	26
10	Khimik Dzerzhinsk	28	8	10	10	32	29	+3	26
11	Zenit Izhevsk	28	8	4	16	25	34	−9	20
12	Druzhba Yoshkar-Ola	28	8	3	17	29	54	−25	19
13	Torpedo Togliatti	28	6	7	15	26	41	−15	19
14	Turbina Naberezhnyye Chelny	28	6	7	15	23	44	−21	19
15	Stal Cheboksary	28	2	10	16	17	41	−24	14

==== Group 3 ====
Pos	Team	Pld	W	D	L	GF	GA	GD	Pts
1	RostSelMash Rostov-na-Donu	30	20	9	1	61	26	+35	49
2	Spartak Nalchik	30	19	6	5	44	16	+28	44
3	Sokol Saratov	30	19	4	7	79	34	+45	42
4	Uralan Elista	30	19	4	7	62	35	+27	42
5	Atommash Volgodonsk	30	14	7	9	57	49	+8	35
6	Terek Grozny	30	14	6	10	56	43	+13	34
7	Druzhba Maykop	30	12	6	12	53	41	+12	30
8	Mashuk Pyatigorsk	30	10	10	10	34	37	−3	30
9	Torpedo Volzhskiy	30	10	7	13	39	44	−5	27
10	Cement Novorossiysk	30	10	6	14	35	39	−4	26
11	Nart Cherkessk	30	9	7	14	31	40	−9	25
12	Volgar Astrakhan	30	10	3	17	34	59	−25	23
13	Torpedo Taganrog	30	7	9	14	33	52	−19	23
14	Dinamo Makhachkala	30	7	6	17	33	66	−33	20
15	Salyut Belgorod	30	5	6	19	28	53	−25	16
16	Strela Voronezh	30	5	4	21	27	72	−45	14

==== Group 4 ====
Pos	Team	Pld	W	D	L	GF	GA	GD	Pts
1	Geolog Tyumen	26	13	9	4	49	31	+18	35
2	Zvezda Irkutsk	26	13	6	7	43	26	+17	32
3	Irtysh Omsk	26	12	8	6	41	36	+5	32
4	Torpedo Rubtsovsk	26	14	3	9	40	29	+11	31
5	Metallurg Novokuznetsk	26	13	4	9	46	33	+13	30
6	Selenga Ulan-Ude	26	12	6	8	37	25	+12	30
7	Dinamo Barnaul	26	12	6	8	41	31	+10	30
8	Manometr Tomsk	26	11	7	8	40	31	+9	29
9	Luch Vladivostok	26	11	5	10	31	31	0	27
10	Avtomobilist Krasnoyarsk	26	11	4	11	31	31	0	26
11	Lokomotiv Chita	26	7	7	12	19	36	−17	21
12	Amur Komsomolsk-na-Amure	26	6	5	15	20	37	−17	17
13	Angara Angarsk	26	5	7	14	25	42	−17	17
14	Amur Blagoveshchensk	26	1	5	20	15	59	−44	7

==== Group 5 ====
Pos	Rep	Team	Pld	W	D	L	GF	GA	GD	Pts
1	LTU	Atlantas Klaipeda	30	19	7	4	49	25	+24	45
2	RUS	Metallurg Lipetsk	30	15	10	5	46	24	+22	40
3	BLR	Dnepr Mogilyov	30	15	9	6	64	34	+30	39
4	BLR	Khimik Grodno	30	15	6	9	43	27	+16	36
5	RUS	Avangard Kursk	30	14	7	9	27	24	+3	35
6	BLR	Dinamo Brest	30	13	7	10	40	33	+7	33
7	MDA	Zarya Beltsy	30	12	7	11	41	34	+7	31
8	EST	Sport Tallinn (Note: SVSM Tallinn changed name to Sport.)	30	13	4	13	43	45	−2	30
9	MDA	Avtomobilist Tiraspol	30	11	8	11	36	41	−5	30
10	RUS	Spartak Tambov	30	10	9	11	32	42	−10	29
11	RUS	Baltika Kaliningrad	30	12	3	15	41	50	−9	27
12	RUS	Spartak Oryol	30	8	10	12	29	32	−3	26
13	LVA	Zvejnieks Liepaja	30	11	3	16	36	49	−13	25
14	BLR	Vityaz Vitebsk (Note: Dvina Vitebsk changed name to Vityaz.)	30	7	6	17	32	49	−17	20
15	BLR	GomSelMash Gomel	30	7	6	17	24	41	−17	20
16	RUS	Dinamo Leningrad	30	5	4	21	22	55	−33	14

==== Group 6 ====
For places 1-14 

Pos	Team	Pld	W	D	L	GF	GA	GD	Pts	Qualification
1	Tavriya Simferopol(C) (Q)	40	25	10	5	69	35	+34	60	Qualified for interzonal competitions among other Zone winners
2	Nyva Vinnytsia	40	22	15	3	102	46	+56	59	
3	Sudnobudivnyk Mykolaiv	40	20	9	11	65	42	+23	49	
4	SKA Kiev	40	17	14	9	53	38	+15	48	
5	SKA Odessa	40	19	9	12	50	39	+11	47	
6	Zakarpattia Uzhhorod	40	16	13	11	58	48	+10	45	
7	Nyva Ternopil	40	17	9	14	44	44	0	43	
8	Kolos Mezhyrich	40	16	11	13	64	50	+14	43	
9	Bukovyna Chernivtsi	40	17	7	16	49	47	+2	41	
10	Zirka Kirovohrad	40	16	9	15	50	49	+1	41	
11	Atlantyka Sevastopol	40	16	9	15	46	44	+2	41	
12	Shakhtar Horlivka	40	14	13	13	49	39	+10	41	
13	Zorya Voroshilovgrad	40	14	10	16	46	40	+6	38	
14	Okean Kerch	40	12	8	20	42	62	−20	32	

==== Group 7 ====
Pos	Rep	Team	Pld	W	D	L	GF	GA	GD	Pts
1	UZB	Sohibkor Halkabad	32	25	5	2	65	22	+43	55
2	UZB	Neftyanik Fergana	32	19	6	7	66	29	+37	44
3	UZB	Zarafshan Navoi	32	18	4	10	53	33	+20	40
4	UZB	Dinamo Samarkand	32	16	8	8	47	27	+20	40
5	UZB	Horezm Yangiaryk	32	13	10	9	34	26	+8	36
6	UZB	Shahrihanets Shahrihan	32	16	3	13	46	37	+9	35
7	UZB	Kasansayets Kasansay	32	14	5	13	48	45	+3	33
8	UZB	Tselinnik Turtkul	32	13	5	14	42	59	−17	31
9	UZB	Avtomobilist Namangan	32	11	7	14	27	36	−9	29
10	UZB	Yangiyer	32	11	6	15	37	50	−13	28
11	UZB	Hiva	32	11	5	16	27	40	−13	27
12	UZB	Geolog Karshi	32	10	7	15	35	60	−25	27
13	KGZ	Alay Osh	32	10	6	16	45	46	−1	26
14	TJK	Hojent Leninabad	32	11	3	18	42	60	−18	25
15	UZB	Surhan Termez	32	9	6	17	32	41	−9	24
16	KGZ	Alga Frunze	32	7	10	15	32	40	−8	24
17	UZB	Narimanovets Bagat	32	6	8	18	27	54	−27	20

==== Group 8 ====
For places 1-6 

Pos	Team	Pld	W	D	L	GF	GA	GD	Pts
1	Meliorator Chimkent	36	24	6	6	86	31	+55	54
2	Tselinnik Tselinograd	36	22	4	10	64	42	+22	48
3	Traktor Pavlodar	36	20	3	13	55	44	+11	43
4	Shakhtyor Karaganda	36	17	8	11	47	42	+5	42
5	Energetik Kustanay	36	16	6	14	60	42	+18	38
6	Spartak Semipalatinsk	36	13	9	14	46	51	−5	35

==== Group 9 ====
Pos	Rep	Team	Pld	W	D	L	GF	GA	GD	Pts
1	GEO	Mertskhali Makharadze	30	21	1	8	59	33	+26	43
2	AZE	Kyapaz Kirovabad	30	18	3	9	74	30	+44	39
3	ARM	Spartak Oktemberyan	30	18	2	10	57	39	+18	38
4	TKM	Kolhozchi Ashkhabad	30	16	5	9	52	30	+22	37
5	AZE	Karabakh Stepanakert	30	17	2	11	52	41	+11	36
6	AZE	Gyanjlik Baku	30	16	3	11	39	32	+7	35
7	GEO	Dinamo Sukhumi	30	15	4	11	44	30	+14	34
8	GEO	Dila Gori	30	13	6	11	42	40	+2	32
9	GEO	Kolkheti Poti	30	14	3	13	46	42	+4	31
10	GEO	Lokomotiv Samtredia	30	14	2	14	46	48	−2	30
11	GEO	Meshakhte Tkibuli	30	12	5	13	47	46	+1	29
12	AZE	Avtomobilist Mingechaur	30	12	4	14	41	44	−3	28
13	GEO	Lokomotiv Tbilisi	30	8	8	14	28	42	−14	24
14	ARM	Shirak Leninakan	30	9	3	18	31	55	−24	21
15	AZE	Araz Nahichevan	30	4	9	17	18	53	−35	17
16	ARM	Olimpia Artashat	30	1	4	25	22	93	−71	6

Source: rsssf.com

=== Top goalscorers ===
Top League

- Oleh Protasov (Dnepr Dneprpetrovsk) – 35 goals

First League

- Valeriy Shmarov (CSKA Moscow) – 29 goals
