= Greg Allen (footballer) =

English footballer (born 1967)

Personal information
- Full name: Gregory Frank Allen
- Date of birth: 18 October 1967 (age 59)
- Place of birth: West Ham, England
- Height: 5 ft 9 in (1.75 m)
- Position: Midfielder

Youth career
- –1985: Arsenal

Senior career*
Years	Team	Apps	(Gls)
1985–1987	Arsenal	0	(0)
1987–1988	Dagenham	14	(2)
1988–1989	Cambridge United	4	(0)
1989–1993	Billericay Town		
1992–1993	Dagenham & Redbridge	3	(0)
- * Club domestic league appearances and goals

Gregory Frank Allen (born 18 October 1967) is an English former professional footballer who played as a midfielder in the Football League for Arsenal and Cambridge United, and in non-League football for Dagenham, Billericay Town and Dagenham & Redbridge.
