= Aleksandr Dozmorov =

Russian footballer

Personal information
- Full name: Aleksandr Yuryevich Dozmorov
- Date of birth: 3 March 1962 (age 64)
- Place of birth: Moscow, Russian SFSR
- Height: 1.80 m (5 ft 11 in)
- Position: Midfielder

Senior career*
Years	Team	Apps	(Gls)
1979	FShM Moscow	31	(2)
1980–1985	Torpedo Moscow	82	(9)
1986	Dinamo Minsk	21	(1)
1987–1988	Lokomotiv Moscow	62	(9)
1989	Guria Lanchkhuti	37	(10)
1990	Torpedo Moscow	11	(3)
1991	Vasas	12	(1)
1992	Bugeac Comrat	9	(3)
1993	Abahani	?	(5)
1994–1995	Asmaral Moscow	45	(7)
1995–1996	Shinnik Yaroslavl	18	(0)
1996	Rubin Kazan	17	(0)
1997	Torpedo-ZIL Moscow	9	(2)
1997	Torpedo Volzhsky	12	(1)

Managerial career
- 2004: Moscow (reserves assistant)
- 2006–2007: Torpedo-RG Moscow (assistant)
- 2007: Torpedo-RG Moscow
- * Club domestic league appearances and goals

Aleksandr Yuryevich Dozmorov (Russian: Александр Юрьевич Дозморов; born 3 March 1962) is a Russian professional football coach and a former player.

== Club career ==
He played 7 seasons in the Soviet Top League for FC Torpedo Moscow, FC Dinamo Minsk and FC Lokomotiv Moscow.

He played 1 game in the UEFA Cup 1986–87 for FC Dinamo Minsk.

== Honours ==
- Soviet Cup finalist: 1982, 1987, 1991.
