= Volodymyr Fink =

Soviet Ukrainian footballer

Personal information
- Date of birth: March 28, 1958
- Place of birth: Slavgorod, Altai Krai, Russian SFSR
- Date of death: January 13, 2005 (aged 46)
- Place of death: Bila Tserkva, Ukraine
- Height: 1.81 m (5 ft 11 1/2 in)
- Position: Striker

Senior career*
Years	Team	Apps	(Gls)
1981	FC Dynamo Barnaul		
1981–1988	FC Chornomorets Odesa	127	(38)
1988–1989	FC Nistru Chişinău	56	(6)
- * Club domestic league appearances and goals

Volodymyr Fink (Ukrainian: Володимир Олександрович Фінк; Russian: Владимир Финк; born March 28, 1958, in Slavgorod, Altai Krai, Russian SFSR; died January 13, 2005, in Bila Tserkva in a car crash) was a Soviet Ukrainian professional football player.

Fink was of a German descent.
