= Vladimir Kapustin =

Soviet and Russian footballer

Personal information
- Full name: Vladimir Vladimirovich Kapustin
- Date of birth: 7 June 1960 (age 66)
- Place of birth: Moscow, Russia
- Height: 1.82 m (5 ft 11 1/2 in)
- Positions: Midfielder; striker

Senior career*
Years	Team	Apps	(Gls)
1978–1984	FC Dynamo Moscow	38	(5)
1985–1989	FC Spartak Moscow	51	(1)
1990	GAIS	0	(0)
1991–1998	Visby IF Gute	176	(88)
2000	Visby IF Gute	3	(1)
- * Club domestic league appearances and goals

Vladimir Vladimirovich Kapustin (Russian: Владимир Владимирович Капустин; born 7 June 1960) is a former Soviet and Russian professional football player, currently working as an assistant coach for the Swedish Division 2 (fourth-tier league) club FC Gute.

== Honours ==
- Soviet Top League champion: 1987, 1989.
- Soviet Top League runner-up: 1985.
- Soviet Top League bronze: 1986.
- USSR Federation Cup winner: 1987.

== European club competitions ==
With FC Spartak Moscow.

- 1986–87 UEFA Cup: 4 games.
- 1987–88 UEFA Cup: 2 games.
- 1988–89 European Cup: 2 games.
- 1989–90 UEFA Cup: 1 game.
