= Viktor Kruglov =

Soviet footballer

Personal information
- Full name: Viktor Mikhailovich Kruglov
- Date of birth: 19 January 1955 (age 71)
- Place of birth: Podolsk, USSR
- Position: Defender

Youth career
- FShM Moscow

Senior career*
Years	Team	Apps	(Gls)
1972–1981	FC Torpedo Moscow	154	(2)
1982–1983	CSKA Moscow	41	(1)
1984–1988	FC Torpedo Moscow	77	(2)

International career
1976–1977	USSR	4	(0)
- * Club domestic league appearances and goals

Viktor Mikhailovich Kruglov (Russian: Виктор Михайлович Круглов; born 19 January 1955, in Podolsk) is a retired Soviet football player.

== Honours ==
- Soviet Top League winner: 1976 (autumn).
- Soviet Cup winner: 1986.

== International career ==
Kruglov made his debut for USSR on 28 November 1976 in a friendly against Argentina. He played in a 1978 FIFA World Cup qualifier against Hungary.
