= Mashalla Ahmadov =

Soviet Azerbaijani footballer (born 1959)

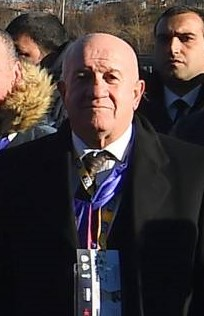

Personal information
- Full name: Mashalla Ahmad ogly Ahmadov
- Date of birth: 2 June 1959 (age 67)
- Place of birth: Kirovabad, Azerbaijan SSR, USSR
- Height: 1.74 m (5 ft 9 in)
- Position: Striker

Senior career*
Years	Team	Apps	(Gls)
1975–1976	Progress Kirovabad		
1976–1989	Neftchi Baku	260	(64)
1979	→ Araz Nakhchivan (loan)		
- * Club domestic league appearances and goals

Mashalla Ahmad ogly Ahmadov (Russian: Машалла Ахмед-оглы Ахмедов; born 2 June 1959) is a retired Soviet Azerbaijani professional football player.

== Career ==
Ahmadov played professional football in the Soviet leagues with Progress Kirovabad, Araz Nakhchivan and Neftchi Baku . He was named one of the three best attacking footballers in the Soviet Union during 1986. He scored 64 goals in 260 Soviet league matches during a career with Neftchi that spanned from 1978 to 1988

== Honours ==
- USSR Federation Cup finalist: 1988.
- Best 33 players of the Soviet Top League season: No. 3 - 1986
