= Torsten Gowitzke =

German footballer and manager

Personal information
- Full name: Torsten Gowitzke
- Date of birth: 8 January 1967 (age 59)
- Place of birth: West Germany
- Height: 1.71 m (5 ft 7 in)
- Position: Midfielder

Youth career
- Hertha Zehlendorf

Senior career*
| Years | Team | Apps | (Gls) |
| 1985–1993 | Hertha BSC | 192 | (20) |
| 1993–1998 | SCC Berlin | | |

Managerial career
- 1998–2000: SCC Berlin
- 2006: SCC Berlin
- * Club domestic league appearances and goals

Torsten Gowitzke (born 8 January 1967) is a German football manager and former player.

Gowitzke plays nowadays for the over-40 team of SFC Stern 1900.
