= Ivan Ondruška =

Slovak footballer

Personal information
- Full name: Ivan Ondruška
- Date of birth: 12 September 1967 (age 59)
- Place of birth: Czechoslovakia
- Position: Goalkeeper

Youth career
- ?–1987: Topoľčany
- 1987–1988: Plastika Nitra

Senior career*
Years	Team	Apps	(Gls)
1988–1994	Plastika Nitra		
1994–1995	1. FC Košice		
1996	Dukla Banská Bystrica		
1996	Sparta Prague	5	(0)
1997–2001	Admira Wien		
2002–2003	FC Nitra		
2003	ViOn Zlaté Moravce		

International career
- Slovakia
- * Club domestic league appearances and goals as of 13 January 2012

Ivan Ondruška (born 12 September 1967) is a former Slovak football goalkeeper who recently played for the Slovak 2. liga club MŠK Rimavská Sobota. He played for Sparta Prague in the Czech First League in 1996.
