= Valeriy Kinashenko =

Ukrainian footballer (born 1964)

Personal information
- Full name: Valeriy Vasylyovych Kinashenko
- Date of birth: 4 February 1964 (age 62)
- Place of birth: Uman, Ukrainian SSR, Soviet Union
- Height: 1.75 m (5 ft 9 in)
- Position: Forward

Youth career
- Dinamo Kiev

Senior career*
Years	Team	Apps	(Gls)
1984–1985	Dinamo Irpen	71	(14)
1989	Desna Chernigov	27	(3)
1992	Pryladyst Mukacheve	21	(10)
1994	Nyva Myronivka	14	(2)
1995	Torpedo Mogilev	10	(0)
1995–1997	Nerafa Slavutych	31	(6)
- * Club domestic league appearances and goals

Valeriy Kinashenko (Ukrainian: Валерій Васильович Кінашенко; born 4 February 1964) is a retired Ukrainian football forward who last played for FC Nerafa Slavutych.

Since 2003 Kinashenko works at the Dynamo Football Academy.
