= Wojciech Ozimek =

Polish footballer

Personal information
- Date of birth: 24 July 1967 (age 59)
- Place of birth: Kielce, Poland
- Height: 1.80 m (5 ft 11 in)
- Position: Defender

Senior career*
Years	Team	Apps	(Gls)
1988–1989	Błękitni Kielce		
1990–1991	Odra Wodzisław		
1991–1992	Górnik Zabrze	22	(0)
1993–1995	Górnik Wojkowice		
1996–1999	Hutnik Kraków		
1999–2001	Bahlinger SC	17	(0)
2001	Górnik Łęczna		
2002	Pogoń Staszów		
2003–2004	FV Biberach		
2004–2005	SV Wehr		
2005	SC Kuhbach-Reichenbach		
2006–2007	SC Friesenheim 1927		
2007–2009	DJK Prinzbach		
2010	FV Biberach		
2011–2015	DJK Prinzbach		
- * Club domestic league appearances and goals

Wojciech Ozimek (born 24 July 1967) is a Polish former professional footballer who played as a defender.
