= Sergey Kulinich =

Russian footballer

Personal information
- Full name: Sergey Anatolyevich Kulinich
- Date of birth: 17 May 1960 (age 66)
- Height: 1.82 m (5 ft 11 1/2 in)
- Position: Defender

Senior career*
Years	Team	Apps	(Gls)
1980–1982	ZAPSIBovets Novokuznetsk	67	(3)
1982–1984	Kuzbass Kemerovo	100	(3)
1985	Dnipro Dnipropetrovsk	3	(0)
1986–1987	Kairat	39	(1)
1988	Metalurh Zaporizhzhia	30	(0)
1989–1990	Kairat	24	(1)
1990	Shakhter Karagandy	39	(1)
1991	Metallurg Novokuznetsk	29	(1)
1992	Podillya Khmelnytskyi	38	(3)
1993	Nyva Vinnytsia	0	(0)
1993	Hajdúszoboszló	16	(1)
1994	Kairat	17	(3)
1995	Tsesna Akmola	14	(1)
1996–1997	Metallurg-ZAPSIB Novokuznetsk	17	(0)

Managerial career
- 1999–2001: Metallurg-ZAPSIB Novokuznetsk (assistant)
- 2001–2002: Metallurg-ZAPSIB Novokuznetsk
- 2002–2003: Metallurg-Kuzbass Novokuznetsk (assistant)
- 2003: Metallurg-Kuzbass Novokuznetsk
- 2003–2004: Metallurg-Kuzbass Novokuznetsk (assistant)
- 2004–2005: Metallurg-Kuzbass Novokuznetsk
- 2005: Metallurg-Kuzbass Novokuznetsk (assistant)
- 2005–2006: Metallurg-Kuzbass Novokuznetsk
- 2006–2010: Metallurg-Kuzbass Novokuznetsk (assistant)
- 2010: Metallurg-Kuzbass Novokuznetsk (caretaker)
- 2011–2012: Kairat (assistant)
- 2013–2015: Kaisar (assistant)
- 2015–2016: Tobol (assistant)
- 2017–2020: Zhetysu (assistant)
- 2020: Zhetysu (caretaker)
- * Club domestic league appearances and goals

Sergey Anatolyevich Kulinich (Russian: Серге́й Анато́льевич Кули́нич; born 17 May 1960) is a Russian professional association football coach and a former player. He also holds the citizenship of Kazakhstan.

As a player, he made an appearance in the 1984–85 European Cup quarterfinal game for Dnipro Dnipropetrovsk against Bordeaux. He played three seasons in the Soviet Top League for Dnipro and Kairat.

== Honours ==
- Soviet Top League bronze: 1985
