= Şener Kurtulmuş =

Turkish footballer

Personal information
- Full name: Şener Kurtulmuş
- Date of birth: 22 December 1967 (age 58)
- Place of birth: Belgium
- Position: Goalkeeper

Senior career*
Years	Team	Apps	(Gls)
1987–1991	Malatyaspor	29	(0)
1991–1993	Sarıyer	20	(0)
1993–1996	Beşiktaş	27	(0)
1996–1998	Kuşadasıspor		
1998–1999	Kasımpaşaspor		
1999	Bayrampaşa Otogarspor		
1999	Ürgüpspor		
- * Club domestic league appearances and goals

Şener Kurtulmuş (22 December 1967) is a Turkish former football goalkeeper. He achieved his biggest career successes at local side Beşiktaş, winning 1. Lig and Presidency Cup, both for once.

== Honours ==
Beşiktaş

- 1. Lig (1): 1994–95
- Presidency Cup (1): 1994

== Personal life ==
In 1995, Rıza Çalımbay, Mehmet Özdilek, Sergen Yalçın, Alpay Özalan, Oktay Derelioğlu, Recep Çetin, Mustafa Özkan, Sertan Eser and, Şener Kurtulmuş took roles in a popular music video of 90's local band Aykut—Hakan—Ayşe. Kurtulmuş married Aylin Yüksel in Cappadocia, Ürgüp, in 2007.
