= Eric de Koeyer =

Dutch footballer

Personal information
- Date of birth: 22 February 1967 (age 59)
- Position: Goalkeeper

Senior career*
Years	Team	Apps	(Gls)
1986–1994	Sporting Lokeren		
1994–1998	R.E. Mouscron		
1998–1999	K.V. Kortrijk		
- * Club domestic league appearances and goals

Eric de Koeyer (born 22 February 1967) is a retired Dutch football goalkeeper.
