= Valeriy Palamarchuk =

Ukrainian footballer

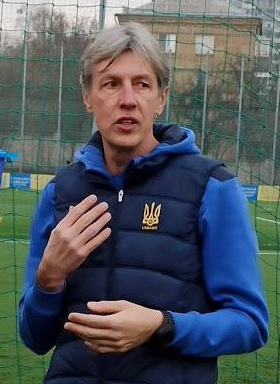

Personal information
- Full name: Valeriy Vitaliovich Palamarchuk
- Date of birth: 11 August 1963 (age 63)
- Place of birth: Lviv, Ukrainian SSR, Soviet Union
- Height: 1.86 m (6 ft 1 in)
- Position: Goalkeeper

Team information
- Current team: Ukraine U21 (goalkeeping coach)

Youth career
- 1981–1983: Dynamo Kyiv

Senior career*
Years	Team	Apps	(Gls)
1981	Nyva Vinnytsia	29	(0)
1981–1983	Dynamo Kyiv	0	(0)
1983–1984	Chernomorets Odesa	1	(0)
1984–1985	SKA Kyiv	34	(0)
1986–1987	Kolos Nikopol	72	(0)
1988	Dinamo Minsk	1	(0)
1988	Sudnobudivnyk Mykolaiv	3	(0)
1989–1991	Karpaty Lviv	13	(0)
1992–1993	Naprzód Rydułtowy		
1993	Budivelnyk Brovary	1	(0)
1994	Metalurh Nikopol	16	(0)
1994	Naprzód Rydułtowy		
1995	Polonia Warsaw	1	(0)
1995	Veres Rivne	10	(0)
1996–1997	Dnipro Kyiv		
1998	Torpedo-Kadino Mogilev	23	(0)
2002	Bucha	9	(0)
2002–2004	Yednist Plysky	6	(0)

International career
1983	Ukrainian SSR	?	

Managerial career
- 2016–: Ukraine U21 (goalkeeping coach)
Medal record
Men's football
Representing Soviet Union
UEFA European U-19 Championships
Bronze medal – third place	1982 Finland
- * Club domestic league appearances and goals

Valeriy Vitaliiovych Palamarchuk (Ukrainian: Валерій Віталійович Паламарчук, romanized: Valerii Vitaliiovych Palamarchuk; born 11 August 1963) is former Ukrainian association footballer.

== Career ==
In 1983 Palamarchuk took part in the Summer Spartakiad of the Peoples of the USSR in the team of Ukrainian SSR. He also participated in the 1983 FIFA World Youth Championship for the Soviet team.
