= Harald Ebertz =

German footballer

Personal information
- Date of birth: 18 May 1967 (age 59)
- Place of birth: Mülheim-Kärlich, West Germany
- Height: 1.89 m (6 ft 2 in)
- Position: Goalkeeper

Youth career
- VfL Oberbieber
- FC Germania Metternich
- SSV Mülheim
- SpVgg Chemie Wirges

Senior career*
Years	Team	Apps	(Gls)
1990–1994	VfB Stuttgart II	102	(0)
1994–1996	1. FC Nürnberg	1	(0)
1996–2001	1. FC Saarbrücken	118	(0)
2001–2002	Stuttgarter Kickers	17	(0)
2002–2003	Borussia Neunkirchen	0	(0)
2003–2005	1. FC Saarbrücken II	12	(1)
- * Club domestic league appearances and goals

Harald Ebertz (born 18 May 1967) is a former German football goalkeeper.
