= 1985 Soviet Second League =

Second League
- Season: 1985

1985 Soviet Second League was a Soviet competition in the Soviet Second League.

== Zonal tournament ==
=== Zone I [Russian Federation] ===
Pos	Team	Pld	W	D	L	GF	GA	GD	Pts
1	Dinamo Bryansk	32	23	5	4	73	30	+43	51
2	Zorkiy Krasnogorsk	32	18	10	4	56	26	+30	46
3	Znamya Truda Orekhovo-Zuyevo	32	16	11	5	67	34	+33	43
4	Arsenal Tula	32	15	12	5	50	34	+16	42
5	Zarya Kaluga	32	17	7	8	58	31	+27	41
6	Textilshchik Ivanovo	32	16	7	9	49	33	+16	39
7	Krasnaya Presnya Moskva	32	16	6	10	47	28	+19	38
8	Spartak Kostroma	32	14	10	8	40	27	+13	38
9	Dinamo Vologda	32	15	7	10	55	41	+14	37
10	Stroitel Cherepovets	32	13	3	16	39	44	−5	29
11	Spartak Ryazan	32	8	11	13	28	40	−12	27
12	FSM Moskva	32	7	10	15	32	56	−24	24
13	Torpedo Vladimir	32	7	8	17	23	53	−30	22
14	Saturn Rybinsk	32	7	7	18	29	48	−19	21
15	Dinamo Kashira	32	5	11	16	31	57	−26	21
16	Volzhanin Kineshma	32	4	5	23	31	72	−41	13
17	Volga Kalinin	32	5	2	25	15	69	−54	12

=== Zone II [Russian Federation] ===
Pos	Team	Pld	W	D	L	GF	GA	GD	Pts
1	Zvezda Perm	28	19	5	4	41	20	+21	43
2	UralMash Sverdlovsk	28	15	8	5	40	21	+19	38
3	Dinamo Kirov	28	15	6	7	41	28	+13	36
4	Uralets Nizhniy Tagil	28	15	5	8	41	22	+19	35
5	Metallurg Magnitogorsk	28	14	7	7	49	25	+24	35
6	Gastello Ufa	28	14	5	9	40	35	+5	33
7	Rubin Kazan	28	13	4	11	34	32	+2	30
8	Lokomotiv Chelyabinsk	28	10	7	11	44	51	−7	27
9	Svetotekhnika Saransk	28	11	4	13	36	41	−5	26
10	Khimik Dzerzhinsk	28	8	10	10	32	29	+3	26
11	Zenit Izhevsk	28	8	4	16	25	34	−9	20
12	Druzhba Yoshkar-Ola	28	8	3	17	29	54	−25	19
13	Torpedo Togliatti	28	6	7	15	26	41	−15	19
14	Turbina Naberezhnyye Chelny	28	6	7	15	23	44	−21	19
15	Stal Cheboksary	28	2	10	16	17	41	−24	14

=== Zone III [Russian Federation] ===
Pos	Team	Pld	W	D	L	GF	GA	GD	Pts
1	RostSelMash Rostov-na-Donu	30	20	9	1	61	26	+35	49
2	Spartak Nalchik	30	19	6	5	44	16	+28	44
3	Sokol Saratov	30	19	4	7	79	34	+45	42
4	Uralan Elista	30	19	4	7	62	35	+27	42
5	Atommash Volgodonsk	30	14	7	9	57	49	+8	35
6	Terek Grozny	30	14	6	10	56	43	+13	34
7	Druzhba Maykop	30	12	6	12	53	41	+12	30
8	Mashuk Pyatigorsk	30	10	10	10	34	37	−3	30
9	Torpedo Volzhskiy	30	10	7	13	39	44	−5	27
10	Cement Novorossiysk	30	10	6	14	35	39	−4	26
11	Nart Cherkessk	30	9	7	14	31	40	−9	25
12	Volgar Astrakhan	30	10	3	17	34	59	−25	23
13	Torpedo Taganrog	30	7	9	14	33	52	−19	23
14	Dinamo Makhachkala	30	7	6	17	33	66	−33	20
15	Salyut Belgorod	30	5	6	19	28	53	−25	16
16	Strela Voronezh	30	5	4	21	27	72	−45	14

=== Zone IV [Russian Federation] ===
Pos	Team	Pld	W	D	L	GF	GA	GD	Pts
1	Geolog Tyumen	26	13	9	4	49	31	+18	35
2	Zvezda Irkutsk	26	13	6	7	43	26	+17	32
3	Irtysh Omsk	26	12	8	6	41	36	+5	32
4	Torpedo Rubtsovsk	26	14	3	9	40	29	+11	31
5	Metallurg Novokuznetsk	26	13	4	9	46	33	+13	30
6	Selenga Ulan-Ude	26	12	6	8	37	25	+12	30
7	Dinamo Barnaul	26	12	6	8	41	31	+10	30
8	Manometr Tomsk	26	11	7	8	40	31	+9	29
9	Luch Vladivostok	26	11	5	10	31	31	0	27
10	Avtomobilist Krasnoyarsk	26	11	4	11	31	31	0	26
11	Lokomotiv Chita	26	7	7	12	19	36	−17	21
12	Amur Komsomolsk-na-Amure	26	6	5	15	20	37	−17	17
13	Angara Angarsk	26	5	7	14	25	42	−17	17
14	Amur Blagoveshchensk	26	1	5	20	15	59	−44	7

=== Zone V (Soviet Republics) ===
Pos	Rep	Team	Pld	W	D	L	GF	GA	GD	Pts
1	LTU	Atlantas Klaipeda	30	19	7	4	49	25	+24	45
2	RUS	Metallurg Lipetsk	30	15	10	5	46	24	+22	40
3	BLR	Dnepr Mogilyov	30	15	9	6	64	34	+30	39
4	BLR	Khimik Grodno	30	15	6	9	43	27	+16	36
5	RUS	Avangard Kursk	30	14	7	9	27	24	+3	35
6	BLR	Dinamo Brest	30	13	7	10	40	33	+7	33
7	MDA	Zarya Beltsy	30	12	7	11	41	34	+7	31
8	EST	Sport Tallinn (Note: SVSM Tallinn changed name to Sport.)	30	13	4	13	43	45	−2	30
9	MDA	Avtomobilist Tiraspol	30	11	8	11	36	41	−5	30
10	RUS	Spartak Tambov	30	10	9	11	32	42	−10	29
11	RUS	Baltika Kaliningrad	30	12	3	15	41	50	−9	27
12	RUS	Spartak Oryol	30	8	10	12	29	32	−3	26
13	LVA	Zvejnieks Liepaja	30	11	3	16	36	49	−13	25
14	BLR	Vityaz Vitebsk (Note: Dvina Vitebsk changed name to Vityaz.)	30	7	6	17	32	49	−17	20
15	BLR	GomSelMash Gomel	30	7	6	17	24	41	−17	20
16	RUS	Dinamo Leningrad	30	5	4	21	22	55	−33	14

=== Zone VI [Ukraine] ===
For places 1-14 

Pos	Team	Pld	W	D	L	GF	GA	GD	Pts	Qualification
1	Tavriya Simferopol(C) (Q)	40	25	10	5	69	35	+34	60	Qualified for interzonal competitions among other Zone winners
2	Nyva Vinnytsia	40	22	15	3	102	46	+56	59	
3	Sudnobudivnyk Mykolaiv	40	20	9	11	65	42	+23	49	
4	SKA Kiev	40	17	14	9	53	38	+15	48	
5	SKA Odessa	40	19	9	12	50	39	+11	47	
6	Zakarpattia Uzhhorod	40	16	13	11	58	48	+10	45	
7	Nyva Ternopil	40	17	9	14	44	44	0	43	
8	Kolos Mezhyrich	40	16	11	13	64	50	+14	43	
9	Bukovyna Chernivtsi	40	17	7	16	49	47	+2	41	
10	Zirka Kirovohrad	40	16	9	15	50	49	+1	41	
11	Atlantyka Sevastopol	40	16	9	15	46	44	+2	41	
12	Shakhtar Horlivka	40	14	13	13	49	39	+10	41	
13	Zorya Voroshilovgrad	40	14	10	16	46	40	+6	38	
14	Okean Kerch	40	12	8	20	42	62	−20	32	

=== Zone VII (Central Asia) ===
Pos	Rep	Team	Pld	W	D	L	GF	GA	GD	Pts
1	UZB	Sohibkor Halkabad	32	25	5	2	65	22	+43	55
2	UZB	Neftyanik Fergana	32	19	6	7	66	29	+37	44
3	UZB	Zarafshan Navoi	32	18	4	10	53	33	+20	40
4	UZB	Dinamo Samarkand	32	16	8	8	47	27	+20	40
5	UZB	Horezm Yangiaryk	32	13	10	9	34	26	+8	36
6	UZB	Shahrihanets Shahrihan	32	16	3	13	46	37	+9	35
7	UZB	Kasansayets Kasansay	32	14	5	13	48	45	+3	33
8	UZB	Tselinnik Turtkul	32	13	5	14	42	59	−17	31
9	UZB	Avtomobilist Namangan	32	11	7	14	27	36	−9	29
10	UZB	Yangiyer	32	11	6	15	37	50	−13	28
11	UZB	Hiva	32	11	5	16	27	40	−13	27
12	UZB	Geolog Karshi	32	10	7	15	35	60	−25	27
13	KGZ	Alay Osh	32	10	6	16	45	46	−1	26
14	TJK	Hojent Leninabad	32	11	3	18	42	60	−18	25
15	UZB	Surhan Termez	32	9	6	17	32	41	−9	24
16	KGZ	Alga Frunze	32	7	10	15	32	40	−8	24
17	UZB	Narimanovets Bagat	32	6	8	18	27	54	−27	20

=== Zone VIII [Kazakhstan] ===
For places 1-6 

Pos	Team	Pld	W	D	L	GF	GA	GD	Pts
1	Meliorator Chimkent	36	24	6	6	86	31	+55	54
2	Tselinnik Tselinograd	36	22	4	10	64	42	+22	48
3	Traktor Pavlodar	36	20	3	13	55	44	+11	43
4	Shakhtyor Karaganda	36	17	8	11	47	42	+5	42
5	Energetik Kustanay	36	16	6	14	60	42	+18	38
6	Spartak Semipalatinsk	36	13	9	14	46	51	−5	35

=== Zone IX (Caucasus) ===
Pos	Rep	Team	Pld	W	D	L	GF	GA	GD	Pts
1	GEO	Mertskhali Makharadze	30	21	1	8	59	33	+26	43
2	AZE	Kyapaz Kirovabad	30	18	3	9	74	30	+44	39
3	ARM	Spartak Oktemberyan	30	18	2	10	57	39	+18	38
4	TKM	Kolhozchi Ashkhabad	30	16	5	9	52	30	+22	37
5	AZE	Karabakh Stepanakert	30	17	2	11	52	41	+11	36
6	AZE	Gyanjlik Baku	30	16	3	11	39	32	+7	35
7	GEO	Dinamo Sukhumi	30	15	4	11	44	30	+14	34
8	GEO	Dila Gori	30	13	6	11	42	40	+2	32
9	GEO	Kolkheti Poti	30	14	3	13	46	42	+4	31
10	GEO	Lokomotiv Samtredia	30	14	2	14	46	48	−2	30
11	GEO	Meshakhte Tkibuli	30	12	5	13	47	46	+1	29
12	AZE	Avtomobilist Mingechaur	30	12	4	14	41	44	−3	28
13	GEO	Lokomotiv Tbilisi	30	8	8	14	28	42	−14	24
14	ARM	Shirak Leninakan	30	9	3	18	31	55	−24	21
15	AZE	Araz Nahichevan	30	4	9	17	18	53	−35	17
16	ARM	Olimpia Artashat	30	1	4	25	22	93	−71	6

Source: rsssf.com

== Final group stage ==
=== Group A ===
Pos	Team	Pld	W	D	L	GF	GA	GD	Pts	ROS	TSI	ZDZ	SKH
1	Rostselmash	6	5	0	1	14	4	+10	10		1–0	5–0	2–0
2	Tavriya Simferopol	6	3	1	2	11	7	+4	7	2–1		4–4	4–2
3	Zvezda Dzhizak	6	3	0	3	8	15	−7	6	1–3	2–1		3–2
4	Sokhibkor Khalkabad	6	0	1	5	5	12	−7	1	1–2	0–0	0–1	

=== Group B ===
Pos	Team	Pld	W	D	L	GF	GA	GD	Pts	AKL	ZPE	MMA	KSK
1	Atlantas Klaipeda	6	4	1	1	9	6	+3	9		2–1	3–1	2–2
2	Zvezda Perm	6	3	1	2	8	5	+3	7	2–0		3–0	1–0
3	Mertskhali Makharadze	6	2	2	2	7	9	−2	6	1–1	2–0		2–2
4	Krylia Sovetov Kuibyshev	6	0	2	4	4	8	−4	2	0–1	1–1	0–1	

=== Group C ===
Pos	Team	Pld	W	D	L	GF	GA	GD	Pts	ISM	MCH	GTY	BRY
1	Iskra Smolensk	6	5	1	0	10	2	+8	11		2–0	2–1	2–0
2	Meliorator Chimkent	6	3	1	2	12	8	+4	7	0–1		2–2	5–1
3	Geolog Tyumen	6	1	2	3	8	10	−2	4	0–0	1–2		4–2
4	Dinamo Bryansk	6	0	2	4	9	19	−10	2	1–3	3–3	2–2	
