= Serhiy Protsyuk =

Ukrainian footballer (born 1963)

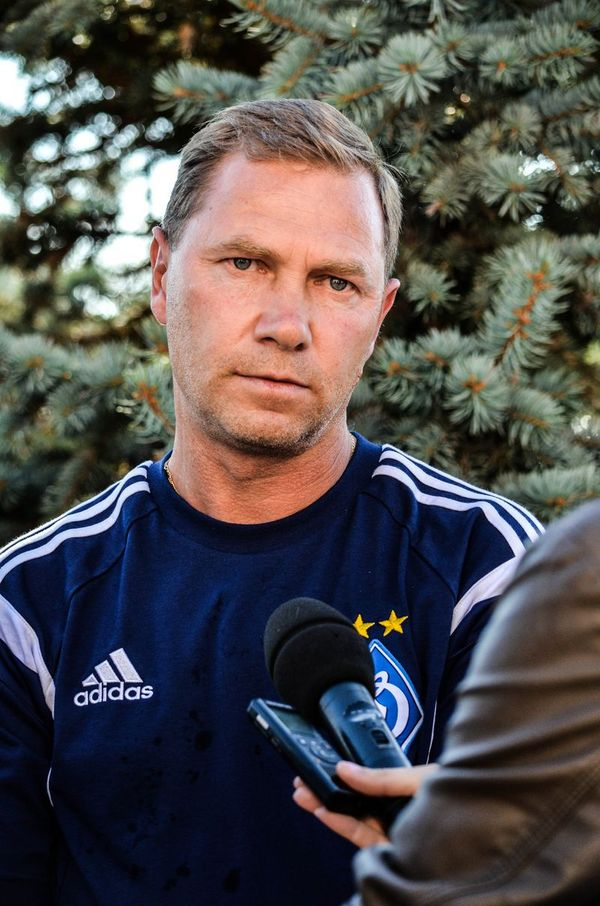

Personal information
- Full name: Serhiy Anatoliyovych Protsyuk
- Date of birth: 7 February 1963 (age 63)
- Place of birth: Kyiv, Ukrainian SSR
- Height: 1.78 m (5 ft 10 in)
- Positions: Defender; midfielder

Youth career
- Nyva Vinnytsia

Senior career*
Years	Team	Apps	(Gls)
1981	Nyva Vinnytsia	35	(2)
1982–1987	Dynamo Kyiv	0	(0)
1984	→ Dynamo Irpen	24	(5)
1987–1989	Chornomorets Odesa	57	(4)
1990–1991	Dynamo Moscow	9	(0)
1991	Tiligul-Tiras Tiraspol	36	(0)
1992–1993	Chornomorets Odesa	26	(0)
1994	Metallurg Novotroitsk	5	(0)
1994–1995	Veres Rivne	14	(0)
1995	Bukovyna Chernivtsi	8	(0)
1996	KaIK	20	(1)
1998	Naftovyk Okhtyrka	1	(0)

International career
1983	Ukrainian SSR		
- * Club domestic league appearances and goals

Serhiy Anatoliyovych Protsyuk (Ukrainian: Сергій Анатолійович Процюк; born 7 February 1963) is a Soviet and Ukrainian former professional footballer who played as a defender and midfielder.

== Club career ==
Protsyuk made his debut in the Soviet Top League in 1988 for Chornomorets Odesa.

In 1983 he took part in the Summer Spartakiad of the Peoples of the USSR in the team of Ukrainian SSR.

== Honours ==
- Soviet Top League bronze: 1990.
- Ukrainian Premier League bronze: 1993.
