= Oleksandr Sorokalet (footballer) =

Personal information
- Full name: Oleksandr Ivanovych Sorokalet
- Date of birth: 16 April 1957
- Place of birth: Voroshylovhrad, Ukrainian SSR
- Date of death: 6 November 2009 (aged 52)
- Place of death: Rostov-on-Don, Russia
- Height: 1.79 m (5 ft 10 1/2 in)
- Positions: Defender; midfielder

Senior career*
Years	Team	Apps	(Gls)
1976–1979	FC Zarya Voroshilovgrad	88	(2)
1980–1983	FC Dynamo Kyiv	50	(1)
1984–1985	FC Zarya Voroshilovgrad	29	(1)
1985–1989	FC Dnipro Dnipropetrovsk	90	(2)
1990–1991	FC Metalurh Zaporizhya	36	(0)
1991	FC Dnipro Dnipropetrovsk	1	(0)
1992–1993	FC Metalurh Zaporizhya	23	(1)
1993–1994	FC Torpedo Zaporizhia	12	(0)
1994–1995	SC Mykolaiv	1	(0)

Managerial career
- 1996–1998: FC Dnipro Dnipropetrovsk (assistant)
- 2007–2009: FC Rostov (scout)
- * Club domestic league appearances and goals

Oleksandr Ivanovych Sorokalet (Ukrainian: Олександр Іванович Сорокалет; Russian: Александр Иванович Сорокалет; born 16 April 1957 in Luhansk; died 6 November 2009 in Rostov-on-Don) was a Soviet Ukrainian professional football player.

== Honours ==
- Soviet Top League champion: 1980, 1981, 1988.
- Soviet Top League runner-up: 1982, 1987, 1989.
- Soviet Top League bronze: 1985.
- Soviet Cup winner: 1982, 1989.
- USSR Super Cup winner: 1989.
- USSR Federation Cup winner: 1986, 1989.

== European club competitions ==
- 1981–82 European Cup with FC Dynamo Kyiv: 1 game.
- 1982–83 European Cup with FC Dynamo Kyiv: 4 games.
- 1986–87 UEFA Cup with FC Dnipro Dnipropetrovsk: 2 games.
- 1988–89 UEFA Cup with FC Dnipro Dnipropetrovsk: 2 games.
