= Oleksandr Hushchyn =

Ukrainian footballer

Personal information
- Full name: Oleksandr Serhiyovych Hushchyn
- Date of birth: 5 August 1966
- Place of birth: Odesa, Ukrainian SSR
- Date of death: 17 January 2000 (aged 33)
- Place of death: Odesa, Ukraine
- Height: 1.68 m (5 ft 6 in)
- Position: Forward

Senior career*
Years	Team	Apps	(Gls)
1984	FC Chornomorets Odesa	0	(0)
1984–1987	FC Dynamo Kyiv	2	(0)
1987–1989	FC Chornomorets Odesa	35	(1)
1990	FC Kristall Kherson	21	(0)
1990–1991	BVSC Budapest		
1991–1992	Csepel SC		
1993	Oulun Palloseura		
1993–1994	SK Odesa	42	(7)
1995	FC Dnistrovets Bilhorod-Dnistrovskyi	1	(0)
1995	FC Zorya-MALS Luhansk	12	(1)
1996	FC Kremin Kremenchuk	9	(0)
1996–1998	FC Nosta Novotroitsk	87	(26)
Medal record
Men's football
Representing Soviet Union
UEFA European U-16 Championships
Runner-up	1984 West Germany
- * Club domestic league appearances and goals

Oleksandr Serhiyovych Hushchyn (Ukrainian: Олександр Сергійович Гущин; born 5 August 1966; died 17 January 2000) was a Ukrainian professional footballer.

== Honours ==
- Soviet Top League champion: 1985.
