= Anton Brovarnik =

Soviet football goalkeepe

Personal information
- Full name: Anton Leonidovich Brovarnik
- Date of birth: 20 November 1967 (age 58)
- Place of birth: Kiev, Soviet Union
- Height: 1.94 m (6 ft 4 in)
- Position: Goalkeeper

Youth career
- 1980–1983: Dynamo Kyiv

Senior career*
Years	Team	Apps	(Gls)
1984–1986	Dynamo Kyiv	0	(0)
1987–2006	Zorya Voroshilovgrad	20	(0)
1988–1989	Sudostroitel	65	(0)
1990	Temp Korsun-Shevchenkivsky	13	(0)
1992–1993	Hutnik Warszawa	?	(?)
1993–1994	FC Kuban Krasnodar	19	(0)
Total		117	(0)

International career
1985	USSR U18	9	(0)
- * Club domestic league appearances and goals

Anton Leonidovich Brovarnik (Ukrainian: Антон Леонідович Броварник; born 20 November 1967) was a Soviet football goalkeeper.

== Club career ==
From 1980 to 1984, Anton Brovarnik was engaged in football at the Dynamo sports school, where he studied under the guidance of such mentors as Viktor Kolotov, Anatoly Puzach and Valeriy Lobanovskyi.

In 1982, the first success came to the pupil of Kiev Dynamo. At the All-Union tournament of the Central Committee of the Komsomol "Youth" the Ukrainian SSR team under the leadership of coach Vadym Dobizha became the champion of youth competitions. With the Brovarnik Tymerlan Huseynov, Vladimir Bedny, Pavlo Kikot and others.

A year later, in 1983, as part of the Kiev national team, Anton Brovarnik became the winner of the All-Ukrainian Spartakiada football, and a little later with the Ukrainian team won at the All-Union tournament "Hope", where the young goalkeeper was recognized as the best goalkeeper of the tournament. Anton's partners in the Ukrainian SSR team were the future champions of Europe in 1990 as part of the USSR youth team Andriy Kovtun and Serhiy Shmatovalenko, as well as a number of other players who later became well-known football players.

=== The USSR youth team ===
After a number of significant team and personal successes in the Ukrainian and All-Union competitions, the goalkeeper was invited to the USSR youth team, in which young "Dynamo" goalkeeper also managed to show his best qualities. Participated in the USSR national team in the international tournament for prizes Valentin Granatkin, having carried out key fights in its composition and becoming the best goalkeeper of the tournament.

In April 1985, as part of the junior team took part in an international team tournament in the French city of Cannes. The Soviet team included players such as Igor Dobrovolski, Oleh Volotyok, Andrey Pyatnitsky, Andriy Sydelnykov, Igor Leonov. As a result of the tournament, Sergei Mosyagin wards took only seventh place, having beaten Yugoslavia in the last match (2:1).

In a professional career he played for clubs: Zorya Voroshilovgrad, Sudostroitel, Hutnik Warszawa and Russian FC Kuban Krasnodar.

After the completion of the playing career, Anton Brovarnik became an orthoped–rehabilitolog.

== Honours ==
- USSR champion among the doubles of the senior league in 1985.
- Silver medalist of the USSR championship among the substitutes of the senior league in 1984
- Winner of the first All-Union Youth Games of 1985.
- Bronze medalist of the international tournament among junior teams at the Granatkin Memorial 1985.
- Winner of the VIII Summer Spartakiad of the Ukrainian SSR in 1983.
- The owner of the Cup of Youth in 1982.
- The owner of the Cup of Hope in 1983.
- Bronze winner of the Cup of Hope in 1984.
- The best goalkeeper of the international tournament Granatkin Memorial 1985.
