= Vasyl Yevseyev =

Ukrainian footballer (1962–2010)

Vasyl Yevseyev Василь Євсєєв
Personal information
- Full name: Vasyl Arkadiyovych Yevseyev
- Date of birth: 30 August 1962
- Place of birth: Luhansk, Ukrainian SSR
- Date of death: 26 June 2010 (aged 47)
- Place of death: Kyiv, Ukraine
- Height: 1.83 m (6 ft 0 in)
- Position: Defender

Senior career*
Years	Team	Apps	(Gls)
1980–1982	Zarya Voroshilovgrad	83	(0)
1983–1987	Dynamo Kyiv	94	(0)
1988–1991	Shakhtar Donetsk	109	(5)
1991–1992	Maccabi Haifa	16	(0)
1992–1993	Evis Mykolaiv	18	(0)
1993	Tekstilshchik Kamyshin	1	(0)
1993–1994	Dynamo-2 Kyiv	34	(1)
1994	Bukovyna Chernivtsi	5	(0)
1994–1995	Nyva Vinnytsia	3	(0)
1996	Uralan Elista	18	(0)

Managerial career
- 1997: Uralan Elista (assistant)
- 2001–2002: Vorskla Poltava (assistant)
- 2004–2005: CSKA Kyiv
- 2007–2010: Arsenal Kyiv (assistant)
- 2010: Arsenal Kyiv (caretaker)
- * Club domestic league appearances and goals

Vasyl Arkadiyovych Yevseyev (Ukrainian: Василь Аркадійович Євсєєв; Russian: Василий Аркадьевич Евсеев; 30 August 1962 – 26 June 2010) was a Ukrainian professional football coach and player.

== Playing career ==
Yevseyev made his professional debut in the Soviet First League in 1980 for FC Zarya Voroshilovgrad, studying at the school of the same club from 1972.

Before the start of the 1983 season, he had offers from a number of leading Soviet clubs, and made his choice in favor of Dynamo Kyiv. He played in the main defense of the Kyivans team, later lost his place in the starting lineup and in 1988 moved to Donetsk "Shakhtar".

In 1992, he moved to Israel, joining the club "Maccabi" (Haifa). Due to an injury, he was unable to play in Israel and in the same year returned to Ukraine, where he played for the FC "Evis". Subsequently, during the years 1993-1996, he played in a number of Ukrainian and Russian clubs, the last of which was "Uralan" from the russian Elista, where he ended his playing career in 1996.

== Coaching career ==
In 1997, he tried his hand as an assistant head coach in the same "Uralan". During 2001-2002, he helped coach Vorskla Poltava, and in 2004-2005, he headed CSKA Kyiv. In 2007, he joined the coaching staff of Arsenal Kyiv, headed by Oleksandr Zavarov, who was well-known to Yevseev from their joint performances at Zorya Luhansk, and later at Dynamo Kyiv.

After Vyacheslav Grozny resigned as head coach of Arsenal in the spring of 2010, together with Yuriy Bakalov, he served as head coach of the club's main team until the end of the 2009-2010 season.

Yevseyev worked as an assistant manager with Arsenal Kyiv.

== Personal life ==
He was father of Ukrainian footballer Yevhen Yevseyev, who played for Arsenal Kyiv and was killed in a car accident on 19 August 2011.

== Death ==
On 26 June 2010, Yevseyev committed suicide by jumping.

== Honours ==
- Soviet Top League champion: 1985, 1986.
- Soviet Cup winner: 1987.
- Order of Merit (third class): 13 May 2016, posthumously

== European club competitions ==
With FC Dynamo Kyiv.

- European Cup 1986–87: 3 games.
- European Cup 1987–88: 2 games.
