= Boris Kuznetsov (footballer, born 1957) =

Russian footballer

Personal information
- Full name: Boris Yaroslavovich Kuznetsov
- Date of birth: 25 May 1957 (age 69)
- Place of birth: Moscow, Russian SFSR
- Height: 1.80 m (5 ft 11 in)
- Positions: Defender; midfielder

Senior career*
Years	Team	Apps	(Gls)
1975–1978	CSKA Moscow	36	(0)
1979–1982	Lokomotiv Moscow	151	(3)
1983–1984	CSKA Moscow	51	(1)
1985–1988	Spartak Moscow	85	(0)
1988	Rostselmash Rostov-on-Don	32	(5)
1989	Rotor Volgograd	7	(0)
1989–1990	Spartak Moscow	5	(0)
1990–1992	ZVL Žilina		
1992	Mohameddan		
- * Club domestic league appearances and goals

Boris Yaroslavovich Kuznetsov (Russian: Борис Ярославович Кузнецов; born 25 May 1957) is a former Russian professional footballer.

Kuznetsov began playing football with local side CSKA Moscow. He also played as a central defender for Lokomotiv Moscow and Spartak Moscow in the Soviet Top League.

== Honours ==
- Soviet Top League champion: 1987, 1989
- Soviet Top League runner-up: 1985
- Soviet Top League bronze: 1986
- USSR Federation Cup winner: 1987

== European club competitions ==
With FC Spartak Moscow

- UEFA Cup 1986–87: 6 games
- UEFA Cup 1987–88: 4 games
