= 1986 Soviet Top League =

49th season of top-tier football league in Soviet Union

Soviet Top League
- Season: 1986
- Champions: FC Dynamo Kyiv (12th title)
- Relegated: Chornomorets, Torpedo Kt.
- European Cup: Dynamo Kyiv
- Cup Winners' Cup: Dinamo Mn. (finalist)
- UEFA Cup: Dynamo Moscow; Spartak Moscow; Zenit Leningrad; Dinamo Tbilisi
- Matches: 240
- Goals: 579 (2.41 per match)
- Top goalscorer: (21) Aleksandr Borodyuk (Dynamo Moscow)
- Biggest home win: Spartak 7–0 Dynamo Mn. (26th)
- Biggest away win: Dynamo Mn. 0–4 Torpedo (11th); Torpedo Kt. 0–4 Dynamo (27th)
- Highest scoring: Dinamo Mn. 7–2 Žalgiris (30th)

The 1986 Soviet Top League season was the 17th in Top League and 49th of its kind (between clubs). Dynamo Kyiv were the defending 11-times champions.

A total of sixteen teams participated in the league, which was two teams fewer than in the 1985 season and no teams were promoted from the First League due to the league reorganization. Also it was the only season when the Top League contained more Ukrainian clubs rather than Russian 5 to 4. The overdraw concept was preserved with no more than 10 draws being allowed (same as the previous season). Dynamo Kyiv, however, was excused from the rule because the Soviet national football team, consisting almost exclusively out of the first team of Dynamo Kyiv, participated at the 1986 FIFA World Cup. The reduction of the league was compensated by the introduction of a new competition, the Cup of Football Federation of USSR. For that purpose the league took a short break in September when the new competition kicked off and involved only the participants of the Soviet Top League. The new competition was brief, lasting for just over a month.

The season began on March 1 and lasted until November 22, 1986, however some additional postponed games were played until December 7. The season was won by Dynamo Kyiv once again for the 12th time on the last day of the season on December 7 when they faced off against their main opponent Dynamo Moscow in Kiev, pulling off a dramatic 2–1 win and thus passing their Moscow rivals in the final league standings.

The top five clubs of the league later entered European competitions, joined additionally by the losing cup finalist Dinamo Minsk, beaten by Dynamo Kyiv in the 1987 Final. The winner of the 1986 League Cup Dnipro Dnipropetrovsk did not qualify for any European tournaments.

== Teams ==
=== Promoted teams ===
- none

=== Location ===
Locations of teams in the 1989 Top League

== League standings ==
Pos	Team	Pld	W	D	L	GF	GA	GD	Pts	Qualification or relegation
1	(Ukrainian Soviet Socialist Republic) Dynamo Kyiv (C)	30	14	11	5	53	33	+20	39	Qualification for European Cup first round
2	(Russian Soviet Federative Socialist Republic) Dinamo Moscow	30	14	11	5	46	26	+20	38 (Note: 1 point deducted (10 draw limit))	Qualification for UEFA Cup first round
3	(Russian Soviet Federative Socialist Republic) Spartak Moscow	30	14	9	7	52	21	+31	37	Qualification for UEFA Cup first round
4	(Russian Soviet Federative Socialist Republic) Zenit Leningrad	30	12	9	9	44	36	+8	33	Qualification for UEFA Cup first round
5	(Georgian Soviet Socialist Republic) Dinamo Tbilisi	30	12	9	9	36	36	0	33	Qualification for UEFA Cup first round
6	(Ukrainian Soviet Socialist Republic) Shakhtar Donetsk	30	11	9	10	40	38	+2	31	
7	(Kazakh Soviet Socialist Republic) Kairat Alma-Ata	30	11	8	11	33	39	−6	30	
8	(Lithuanian Soviet Socialist Republic) Žalgiris Vilnius	30	11	8	11	32	37	−5	30	
9	(Russian Soviet Federative Socialist Republic) Torpedo Moscow	30	10	11	9	31	28	+3	30	
10	(Byelorussian Soviet Socialist Republic) Dinamo Minsk	30	10	8	12	37	40	−3	28	Qualification for Cup Winners' Cup first round
11	(Ukrainian Soviet Socialist Republic) Dnipro Dnipropetrovsk	30	8	12	10	41	41	0	28	
12	(Ukrainian Soviet Socialist Republic) Metalist Kharkiv	30	9	9	12	21	25	−4	27	
13	(Azerbaijan Soviet Socialist Republic) Neftçi Baku	30	8	12	10	33	38	−5	26 (Note: 2 points deducted (10 draw limit))	
14	(Armenian Soviet Socialist Republic) Ararat Yerevan	30	8	10	12	27	44	−17	26	
15	(Ukrainian Soviet Socialist Republic) Chornomorets Odessa (R)	30	8	7	15	29	37	−8	23	Relegation to First League
16	(Georgian Soviet Socialist Republic) Torpedo Kutaisi (R)	30	5	7	18	24	60	−36	17	Relegation to First League

(C) Champions; (R) Relegated
Notes:

Next year promotion

- CSKA Moscow (Russian SFSR)
- Guria Lanchkhuti (Georgian SSR)

== Results ==
Home \ Away	ARA	CHO	DNI	DYK	DMN	DYN	DTB	KAI	MKH	NEF	SHA	SPA	TKU	TOR	ŽAL	ZEN
Ararat Yerevan		1–1	3–3	2–2	0–0	0–1	2–0	1–0	1–0	0–0	2–1	1–0	3–1	0–0	0–1	1–3
Chornomorets Odessa	0–0		2–2	1–4	3–0	1–3	1–3	2–0	1–0	1–0	1–0	0–1	3–0	1–2	0–2	2–2
Dnipro	2–1	1–0		2–2	1–0	1–2	2–3	5–0	2–1	1–1	1–0	1–3	2–0	1–2	2–2	0–0
Dynamo Kyiv	2–0	2–1	2–1		3–2	2–1	1–3	1–0	2–0	1–1	4–1	2–1	5–0	0–0	0–3	5–3
Dinamo Minsk	0–0	0–0	1–1	1–1		2–0	4–0	2–1	1–0	3–1	1–2	2–1	2–1	0–4	7–2	1–2
Dynamo Moscow	6–0	2–0	1–0	1–1	0–2		2–0	1–1	0–0	2–1	3–0	2–1	2–1	1–1	1–1	3–4
Dinamo Tbilisi	1–0	0–2	1–2	1–1	2–1	1–2		2–0	2–2	2–0	1–0	0–0	2–1	4–3	2–1	0–1
Kairat Alma-Ata	3–0	1–1	2–2	2–1	1–0	1–1	0–0		3–2	3–1	2–0	1–0	1–0	0–3	4–1	1–1
Metalist Kharkiv	1–0	1–0	1–0	1–0	1–0	1–2	1–1	1–0		2–0	0–1	0–0	2–1	2–3	0–0	1–0
Neftçi Baku	0–0	3–1	2–1	0–0	1–1	0–0	2–2	0–1	0–0		3–3	2–1	1–1	2–0	2–0	1–1
Shakhtar Donetsk	1–1	2–1	1–1	3–3	2–1	1–0	1–1	2–0	2–0	1–3		3–1	5–0	1–1	3–1	1–1
Spartak Moscow	6–2	1–1	1–1	1–0	7–0	2–2	0–0	3–0	0–0	4–0	2–0		5–0	4–0	2–0	0–0
Torpedo Kutaisi	2–3	2–1	3–2	0–0	0–0	0–4	0–0	2–2	0–0	1–3	2–2	0–1		1–0	1–0	1–4
Torpedo Moscow	0–1	1–0	1–1	1–1	0–0	0–0	0–2	0–1	1–0	3–1	0–0	0–2	2–0		0–0	1–1
Žalgiris Vilnius	4–1	1–0	0–0	0–2	2–1	1–1	1–0	1–1	1–0	1–0	0–1	1–1	1–2	1–0		2–1
Zenit Leningrad	3–1	0–1	3–0	0–3	1–2	0–0	3–0	3–1	1–1	1–2	1–0	0–1	2–1	0–2	2–1	

Legend: Blue = home team win; Yellow = draw; Red = away team win.

== Top scorers ==
21 goals

- Aleksandr Borodyuk (Dynamo Moscow)

17 goals

- Oleh Protasov (Dnipro)
- Sergey Rodionov (Spartak Moscow)

13 goals

- Mashalla Akhmedov (Neftchi)
- Georgi Kondratyev (Dinamo Minsk)

12 goals

- Alexei Mikhailichenko (Dynamo Kyiv)
- Ihor Petrov (Shakhtar)
- Yuri Savichev (Torpedo Moscow)

10 goals

- Ihor Belanov (Dynamo Kyiv)
- Revaz Chelebadze (Dynamo Tbilisi)
- Arminas Narbekovas (Žalgiris)
- Yevstafi Pekhlevanidi (Kairat)

== Medal squads ==
(league appearances and goals listed in brackets)

1. FC Dynamo Kyiv

Goalkeepers: Viktor Chanov (30), Mykhaylo Mykhaylov (3).
Defenders: Anatoliy Demyanenko (29 / 2), Oleh Kuznetsov (27 / 2), Andriy Bal (26), Volodymyr Bezsonov (16 / 1), Vasyl Yevseyev (15), Sergei Baltacha (13), Vladimir Gorilyi (9), Vadym Karatayev (8 / 1), Mykhaylo Olefirenko (2), Ivan Palamar (1).
Midfielders: Vasyl Rats (30 / 7), Pavlo Yakovenko (28 / 2), Vadym Yevtushenko (27 / 6), Oleksiy Mykhaylychenko (20 / 12), Oleksandr Zavarov (20 / 4), Ivan Yaremchuk (15 / 3).
Forwards: Oleg Blokhin (23 / 2), Ihor Belanov (22 / 10), Oleksandr Shcherbakov (12 / 1).

Manager: Valeriy Lobanovskyi.

Transferred out during the season: Mykhaylo Olefirenko (to FC Shakhtar Donetsk), Ivan Palamar (to FC Nyva Vinnytsia).

2. FC Dynamo Moscow

Goalkeepers: Aleksei Prudnikov (30), Aleksandr Uvarov (1).
Defenders: Aleksandr Novikov (27 / 1), Boris Pozdnyakov (27 / 1), Sergei Silkin (25), Igor Bulanov (24 / 3), Viktor Losev (23), Sergei Kozhanov (15), Aleksandr Golovnya (8), Vladimir Demidov (8), Vasili Zhupikov (6).
Midfielders: Vasili Karatayev (30 / 4), Igor Dobrovolski (28 / 4), Viktor Vasilyev (21), Aleksandr Molodtsov (15 / 1), Andrey Kobelev (15), Yuri Pudyshev (6), Valeri Matyunin (2).
Forwards: Aleksandr Borodyuk (28 / 21), Sergei Stukashov (25 / 7), Igor Kolyvanov (17 / 4).

Manager: Eduard Malofeyev.

Transferred out during the season: Vasili Zhupikov (to Sport Tallinn), Yuri Pudyshev (to FC Dynamo Stavropol), Valeri Matyunin (to FC Fakel Voronezh).

3. FC Spartak Moscow

Goalkeepers: Rinat Dasayev (24), Stanislav Cherchesov (7).
Defenders: Boris Kuznetsov (30), Vagiz Khidiyatullin (27 / 4), Aleksandr Bubnov (21), Yuri Susloparov (20), Aleksandr Shibayev (18), Almir Kayumov (15), Gennady Morozov (13), Valeri Popelnukha (5), Gennadi Bogachyov (4), Yuri Klyuchnikov (1).
Midfielders: Yevgeni Kuznetsov (26 / 3), Fyodor Cherenkov (22 / 8), Sergei Novikov (17 / 3), Aleksei Yeryomenko (15 / 4), Renat Ataulin (15), Sergei Volgin (9 / 1), Andrei Mitin (8 / 1), Vladimir Kapustin (8), Igor Shalimov (5 / 1), Nikolai Latysh (5), Igor Ivanov (4).
Forwards: Andrei Rudakov (24 / 9), Sergey Rodionov (23 / 17), Mikhail Rusyayev (11), Oleg Kuzhlev (9 / 1).

Manager: Konstantin Beskov.

Transferred out during the season: Sergei Volgin (to FC Kairat), Nikolai Latysh (to FC Zirka Kirovohrad), Igor Ivanov (to FC Pakhtakor Tashkent), Yuri Klyuchnikov (to FC Sokol Saratov).

== Number of teams by union republic ==
Rank	Union republic	Number of teams	Club(s)
1	Ukrainian SSR	5	Chernomorets Odessa, Dinamo Kiev, Dnepr Dnepropetrovsk, Metallist Kharkov, Shakhter Donetsk
2	RSFSR	4	Dinamo Moscow, Spartak Moscow, Torpedo Moscow, Zenit Leningrad
3	Georgian SSR	2	Dinamo Tbilisi, Torpedo Kutaisi
4	Armenian SSR	1	Ararat Yerevan
4	Azerbaijan SSR	1	Neftchi Baku
4	Belarusian SSR	1	Dinamo Minsk
4	Kazakh SSR	1	Kairat Alma-Ata
4	Lithuanian SSR	1	Zhalgiris Vilnius

== Attendances ==
No.	Club	Average	Change	Highest
1	Dinamo Tbilisi	37,153	-31,7%	74,300
2	Ararat	37,140	39,3%	67,600
3	Dynamo Kyiv	33,913	-5,6%	100,000
4	Shakhtar Donetsk	24,813	14,4%	37,500
5	Zenit	24,347	-2,2%	57,200
6	Torpedo Kutaisi	21,767	-18,7%	32,000
7	Dnipro	20,513	-19,6%	30,000
8	Spartak Moscow	19,967	-20,6%	45,000
9	Metalist Kharkiv	15,920	-17,6%	31,000
10	Chornomorets	14,480	-16,6%	39,000
11	Dynamo Moscow	13,527	48,2%	35,000
12	Dinamo Minsk	13,273	-45,7%	32,000
13	Neftçhi	12,767	12,1%	30,200
14	Kairat	9,900	-39,7%	18,000
15	Torpedo Moscow	8,273	43,2%	30,000
16	Žalgiris	6,773	-17,1%	12,000
