= Bogachyov =

Bogachyov or Bogachov (masculine, Russian: Богачёв) or Bogachyova (feminine, Russian: Богачёва) is a Russian surname. It is usually mixed up with the very similar Russian surname Bogachev (Russian: Богачев, feminine Bogacheva). Notable people with the surname include:

- Ekaterina Lyubushkina (née Bogachyova in 1990), Russian volleyball player
- Evgeniy Mikhailovich Bogachev, author of GameOverZeus malware
- Gennadi Bogachyov (footballer) (born 1967), Russian football player
- Gennadi Bogachyov (actor)
- Irina Bogacheva (athlete) (born 1961), Kyrgyzstani long-distance runner
- Irina Bogacheva (mezzo-soprano) (1939–2019), Russian opera singer
- Nikolay Bogachyov (born 1953), Russian businessman and politician
