= Kozhanov =

Kozhanov (Russian: Кожанов) is a Russian surname that may refer to:

- Denys Kozhanov (born 1987), Ukrainian footballer
- Oleg Kozhanov (born 1987), Russian footballer
- Oleksandr Kozhanov (born 1986), Ukrainian Software Development Technology Expert
- Sergei Kozhanov (born 1964), Soviet and Russian footballer
- Yuriy Kozhanov (born 1990), Kazakh basketball player
