= Valeriy Lobanovskyi =

Ukrainian football manager (1939–2002)

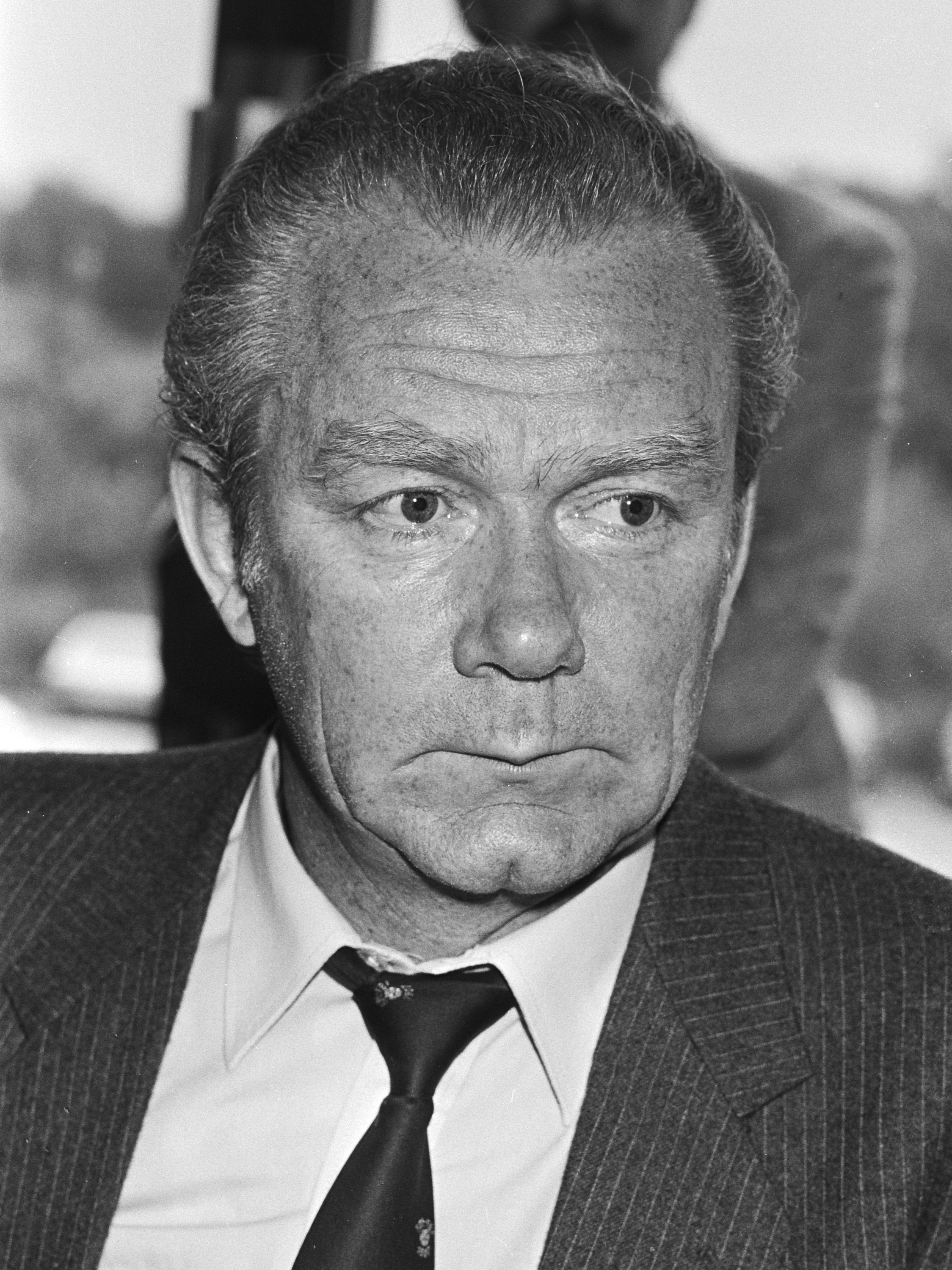
- Lobanovskyi in 1985

Personal information
- Full name: Valeriy Vasylyovych Lobanovskyi
- Date of birth: 6 January 1939
- Place of birth: Kyiv, Ukrainian SSR, Soviet Union (now Ukraine)
- Date of death: 13 May 2002 (aged 63)
- Place of death: Zaporizhzhia, Ukraine
- Height: 1.87 m (6 ft 1 1/2 in)
- Position: Forward

Youth career
- 1952–1955: Football School No. 1
- 1955–1956: Football School of Youth (FShM)

Senior career*
| Years | Team | Apps | (Gls) |
| 1957–1964 | Dynamo Kyiv | 144 | (42) |
| 1965–1966 | Chornomorets Odesa | 59 | (15) |
| 1967–1968 | Shakhtar Donetsk | 50 | (14) |
| Total | | 253 | (71) |

International career
| 1960–1961 | Soviet Union | 2 | (0) |

Managerial career
- 1969–1973: Dnipro Dnipropetrovsk
- 1973–1982: Dynamo Kyiv
- 1975–1976: Soviet Union
- 1979: Ukrainian SSR
- 1982–1983: Soviet Union
- 1984–1990: Dynamo Kyiv
- 1986–1990: Soviet Union
- 1990–1993: United Arab Emirates
- 1994–1996: Kuwait
- 1997–2002: Dynamo Kyiv
- 2000–2001: Ukraine
Medal record
Men's football
Representing Soviet Union (as manager)
UEFA European Championship
| Runner-up | 1988 West Germany |
Olympic Games
| Bronze medal – third place | 1976 Montreal |
Representing Kuwait (as manager)
Asian Games
| Bronze medal – third place | 1994 Hiroshima |
Arabian Gulf Cup
| Winner | 1996 Oman |
Valeriy Lobanovskyi HOU OS
- Валерій Лобановський
- Awards: FIFA Order of Merit
- * Club domestic league appearances and goals

Valeriy Vasylyovych Lobanovskyi (Ukrainian: Валерій Васильович Лобановський, pronounced [wɐˈlɛr⁽ʲ⁾ij lobɐˈnɔu̯sʲkɪi̯]; 6 January 1939 – 13 May 2002) was а Soviet and Ukrainian football player and manager. He was Master of Sports of the USSR, Distinguished Coach of the USSR, and a laureate of the UEFA Order of Merit in Ruby (2002) and FIFA Order of Merit, the highest honour awarded by FIFA. In 2002 he was awarded the Hero of Ukraine award (posthumously), his nation's highest honour, for his contribution to Ukrainian football.

In 2008, Lobanovskyi was ranked 6th in Inter's list of the 100 Greatest Ukrainians following a nationwide poll that saw around 2.5 million people casting their votes.

Lobanovskyi is most famous for his spells managing FC Dynamo Kyiv and the USSR national football team. Lobanovskyi established Dynamo as the most dominant club in Soviet football in the 1970s and 1980s, winning the Soviet Top League eight times and the Soviet Cup six times in 16 years. In 1975 his Dynamo Kyiv team became the first side from the Soviet Union to win a major European trophy when they beat Hungarian side Ferencváros in the final of the Cup Winners' Cup. During the tournament, Dynamo Kyiv won eight games out of nine, resulting in a winning percentage of 88.88% – a record that stood for 45 years encompassing all of the major European club football competitions. Lobanovskyi and his team repeated their Cup Winners' Cup success in 1986, beating Atletico Madrid in the final. In both 1975 and 1986, two of Dynamo's players (Oleg Blokhin and Igor Belanov respectively) were also awarded the Ballon d'Or under his tutelage. During Lobanovskyi's first two stints, the team also reached the European Cup semi-finals in 1977 and 1987 and quarter-finals in 1976, 1982 and 1983. With the Soviet Union national team, Lobanovskyi reached the finals of Euro 1988, losing to eventual winners the Netherlands, and won the bronze medal at the 1976 Summer Olympic Games.

After returning to Dynamo Kyiv in 1997 for the third time, Lobanovskyi led the team to another successful run in European competition. In the first full season of his third spell, Dynamo reached the quarter-finals of the Champions League in 1998, topping a group that included FC Barcelona, Newcastle United and PSV Eindhoven, famously winning both games against Barcelona, 3–0 in Kyiv and 4–0 at Camp Nou. The following season, Lobanovskyi and his team reached the semi-finals, where they were knocked out by Bayern Munich, with star striker Andriy Shevchenko finishing third in the 1999 Ballon d'Or poll.

Lobanovskyi is highly regarded due to his achievements as a coach and is widely considered one of the greatest managers of all time. According to FourFourTwo, Lobanovskyi is the most successful football manager of the 20th century, having won 30 trophies by 2000. He also holds several managerial records in Soviet football, including most Soviet Top League titles, most Soviet Cup wins (shared with Viktor Maslov) and most USSR Super Cup wins. Lobanovskyi is the only manager to win a major European competition with an Eastern European club twice. He is one of four managers to win the Cup Winners' Cup twice, and one of two (along with Nereo Rocco) to accomplish the feat with the same team. Lobanovskyi has also won the Ukrainian championship five times out of five – an accomplishment not matched by any other manager. Lobanovskyi has coached three Ballon d'Or winners — Oleh Blokhin, Igor Belanov and Andriy Shevchenko.

== Early life ==
Valeriy Lobanovskyi was born on 6 January 1939 in Kyiv. His father was a factory worker, while his mother was a housewife. He studied at the Kyiv school No.319 (now Valeriy Lobanovskyi Prospect, 146), where a plaque commemorating Lobanovskyi is installed and the school itself has been renamed in his honor. In 1956 he joined the Kyiv Polytechnic Institute but later transferred to the Odesa Polytechnic Institute, where he graduated.

== Playing career ==
When the goalkeeper was too far from the near post, Lobanovskyi scored a goal right from the corner.

When the goalkeeper was too close to the near post, Lobanovskyi sent the ball to the far post, where Oleh Bazylevych scored a goal.

Lobanovskyi was a graduate of the Kyiv Football School No. 1 and the Football School of Youth in Kyiv (first coach – Mykola Chayka).

At the age of 18, Lobanovskyi was invited to the B-squad of Dynamo Kyiv, the most prominent Ukrainian football club at the time. His debut in the Soviet Top League came on 29 May 1959 against CSK MO Moscow. Lobanovskyi became famous for his ability to accurately deliver curled balls from corner and free kicks (so-called curl) — often Lobanovskyi was able to score the goal directly from the corner. He had regularly been working on these shots during training sessions, using Magnus effect and his own calculations. The Soviet press compared him to Brazilian forward Didi who regularly curved the ball in a similar way at the 1958 World Cup. Teammates often praised Lobanovskyi for his unorthodox mindset and ability to use dribbling, which was unusual for such tall (187 cm) players.

Since 1960, Lobanovskyi was a full-fledged member of the starting line-up. He was mostly used as a left winger, where he formed a duo with Valentyn Troyanovskyi. That same year he became the club's top goalscorer with 13 goals. In 1961, Dynamo Kyiv became the first football team not from Moscow to win USSR title, with Lobanovskyi scoring 10 goals. He was regularly invited to the national team, but due to strong opposition (at the time there were many top-level left-wingers in Soviet Union like Mikheil Meskhi, Anatoli Ilyin and Galimzyan Khusainov) was able to play only two international games, against Austria and Poland.

Overall he spent seven years with the club before leaving in 1964 due to conflict with the coach Viktor Maslov. Lobanovskyi finished his career after brief spells at Chornomorets Odesa and Shakhtar Donetsk. Lobanovskyi ended his playing career at the age of 29 having scored 71 goals in 253 games in the Soviet Top League (42 goals in 144 matches with Dynamo Kyiv, 15 goals in 59 matches with Chornomorets and 14 goals in 50 matches with Shakhtar).

== Coaching career ==
=== Dnipro Dnipropetrovsk (1968–1973) ===
A year after retiring as a player Lobanovskyi was named the manager of FC Dnipro Dnipropetrovsk on 16 October 1968. That year Dnipro ended up third in the Group 3 (Ukrainian SSR group) of the Class A, group 2. The team won its group next year and entered the league finals, finishing second. In 1970, the league system was reformed and Dnipro entered the newly created Class A, group 1 (later renamed to Soviet First League), which the team won the following year, moving to the Top League. In its first season at the highest level, the club ended up sixth, one point away from silver medals.

=== Dynamo Kyiv (1973–1982), Soviet Union national team (1975–1976, 1982–1983) ===
Lobanovskyi moved to his former club, Dynamo Kyiv, who were impressed by his accomplishments with Dnipro, in October 1973. In January 1974 he was joined by his former teammate, Oleh Bazylevych. These two would work as a coaching duo until October 1976. Both managers had equal rights: Bazylevych was a theorist, and Lobanovskyi was in charge of the training process. During their first season, the Soviet press often criticized them for rationalism and unwillingness to play attacking football (the so-called away model — the team would play away games defensively to score a draw). In that season, the team won both the league and Soviet Cup.

Both Lobanovskyi and Bazylevych understood the importance of accurate calculation of the physical load on players. With cooperation from Anatoly Zelentsov, a scientist from the department of physical education theory of Kyiv State Institute of Physical Education, Lobanovskyi brought a system of calculation of the training process and mathematical modeling of physical load for the team. Zelentsov later headed Dynamo Kyiv's scientific laboratory, which was popularly called the Zelentsov Center. Lobanovskyi was credited for inventing a style of play in which any outfield player can take over the role of any other player in a team, similarly to what was practiced by Rinus Michels at the same time in Netherlands. Unlike Michels, however, Lobanovskyi was developing his style of play scientifically, with a strong emphasis on pressing.

In 1975, Dynamo Kyiv won the European Cup Winners' Cup and then-highly regarded European Super Cup. Dynamo Kyiv became the first Soviet club to win a major European trophy. In the first three rounds of Cup Winners' Cup, the team defeated CSKA Sofia, Eintracht Frankfurt and Bursaspor, winning all home and away games. In semi-finals, Dynamo faced the 1974–75 Eredivisie winner, PSV Eindhoven. The Dutch club was considered one of the most powerful in Europe, being sponsored by Philips. The first leg played in Kyiv ended up 3–0 in favor of Lobanovskyi's team. After losing 1–2 in the second leg, Dynamo Kyiv moved to the final. On 14 May 1975, Dynamo Kyiv won Cup Winners' Cup for the first time, defeating Ferencváros 3–0 in the final. During the tournament, the team won 88.88% of its matches (8 games out of 9), which remained the best winning record among all European main tournaments' winning club sides until 2019–20 season when Bayern Munich won all its matches on its way to the Champions League trophy.

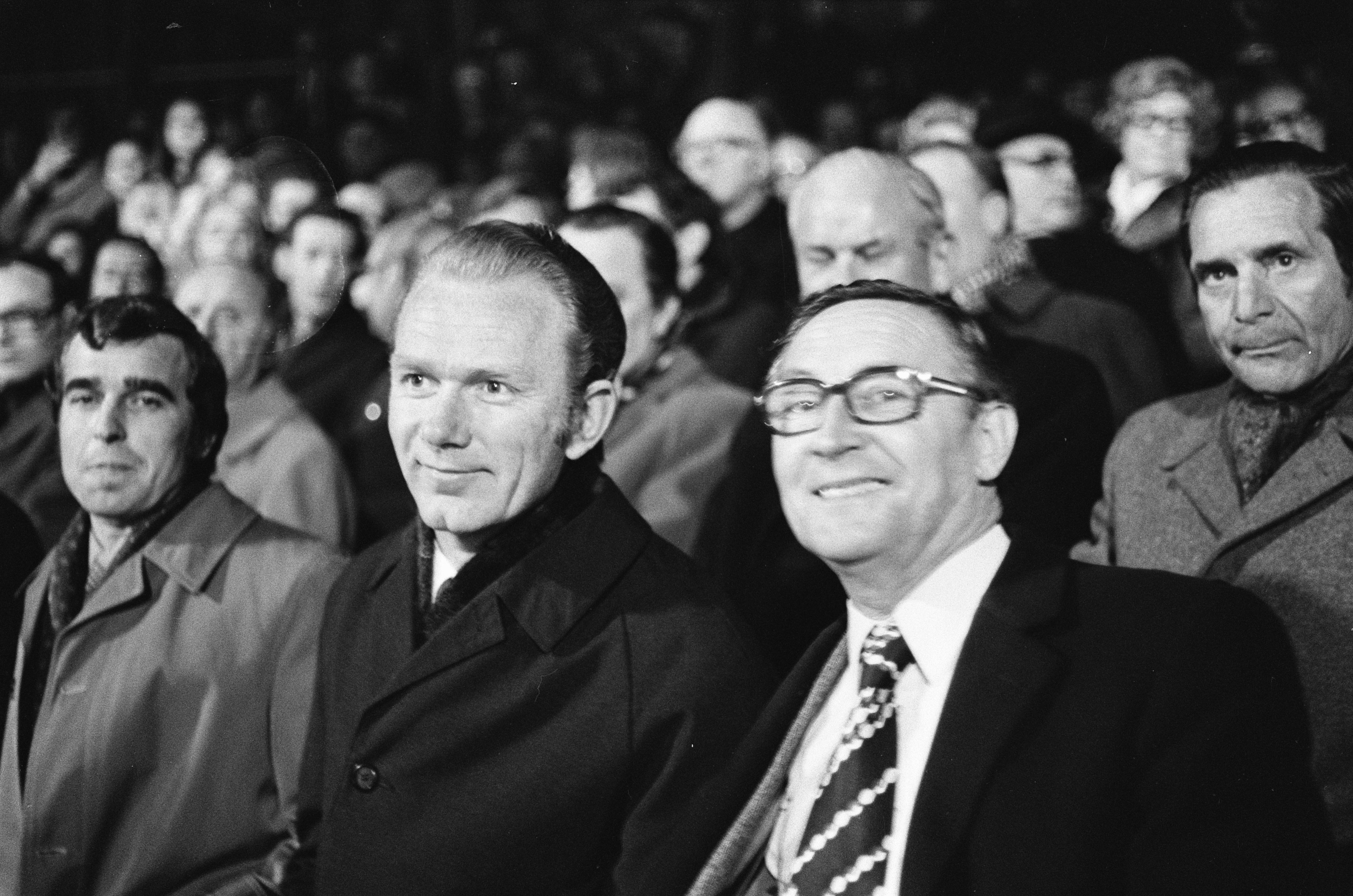
Lobanovskyi (left) in Eindhoven in 1975 together with the manager of PSV Ben van Gelde

In the autumn of that year, Dynamo Kyiv faced the 1974–75 European Cup winner Bayern Munich for the second ever European Super Cup. Besides winning a consecutive European Cup, Bayern was also the base club for the 1974 World Cup winners. The build-up to the match had a political background, mainly in USSR. The Soviet Ukrainian club won both games, 1–0 in Munich and 2–0 in Kyiv in front of 100,000 fans. All goals were scored by Oleg Blokhin who would become Ballon d'Or winner that year. The Lobanovskyi—Bazylevych duo received the World Sports Coach of the Year award.

The Lobanovskyi–Bazylevych duo was appointed managers of the Soviet national team in 1975, after the team lost its first game in the Euro qualifying group to Ireland 3–0. Dynamo Kyiv became the base club of the national team. Despite Lobanovskyi's demands to reorganize national league to autumn-spring format, the USSR Football Federation split 1976 into two seasons (spring and autumn).

Before 1976 season, Lobanovskyi and Bazylevych were pressured by the Moscow officials to accept the Moscow-based Mark Godik as the professional fitness coach to prepare the team for European Cup, Euro qualification and 1976 Summer Olympics. The duo was forced to move the training camp to the mountains where the atmospheric pressure was much higher and the oxygen levels were lower, all while maintaining the same indicators of the intensity of training. The training process was unbalanced, while basic correlation of aerobic and anaerobic exercises was also butchered. Many players struggled during the training process, some players' measured pulses were above 200 beats per minute.

The club competed in the "spring" season mostly with B-squad, as the first team was able to concentrate on their preparation for the three international tournaments. Dynamo Kyiv left the European Cup after quarterfinals, losing to Saint-Étienne (2–0 in Kyiv and 0–3 in France). The national team won its qualifying group but lost to Czechoslovakia in play-offs, thus failing to qualify at the European championship. After winning bronze medal at the Summer Olympic Games, the coaching duo left the national team.

In the summer of 1976, after a conflict between Kyiv's players and managerial stuff, Oleh Bazylevych left the team. In 1977 Dynamo Kyiv regained the USSR championship, losing once in 30 games, and reached semi-finals of the European Cup. After winning all games on the road to quarterfinals, Lobanovskyi's side faced Bayern Munich, the winner of the last three European Cups, for the second time in the last two years. After losing 1–0 in Munich, Kyiv's team scored two unanswered goals in the last 10 minutes of the second leg, moving to semi-finals and ending Bayern's European dominance. In semi-finals, however, Dynamo Kyiv was beaten by another German club, Borussia Mönchengladbach.

In the late 1970s and early 1980s, Dynamo was going through generational change. After finishing second and third in the following two years, the team won back-to-back USSR titles in 1980 and 1981. Lobanovskyi led Dynamo Kyiv to European Cup quarter-finals in 1981 and 1982, before leaving the team at the end of 1982 to return to managing Soviet national team, being in charge of it during Euro qualification. The team was leading its qualifying group before losing their last match against Portugal in Lisbon, conceding the only goal after an incorrectly ruled penalty (the foul happened outside of the penalty area). Lobanovskyi was sacked again.

=== Return to Dynamo Kyiv (1984–1986) ===
After being sacked by Soviet national team, Lobanovskyi returned to Dynamo Kyiv after just one year of absence. The club, having been led by Yury Morozov in 1983, ended up seventh in the league, the lowest since the spring of 1976, when Kyiv was represented mostly by B-squad. The team was going through crisis, with many key players injured. Dynamo Kyiv finished the 1984 season on tenth place, failing to qualify at UEFA tournaments for the first time in 14 years.

Lobanovskyi saw the problems and knew how to solve them. The coach received team's support. Lobanovskyi's side started the 1985 season very strongly and in the end captured another Soviet double, defeating their biggest rival, Spartak Moscow, twice throughout the season.

In 1986, Dynamo Kyiv won their second Cup Winners' Cup. The team lost the first game to Utrecht but then went on an impressive undefeated streak, winning six games and drawing two with a goal difference 25–6. Throughout the tournament, Lobanovskyi's side won all home games (and final) with at least three goals difference. On the road to the final, the team defeated Rapid Wien, the runner-up of the previous Cup Winners' Cup edition, 9–2 on aggregate in quarterfinals and Dukla Prague in semi-finals. In the final, Dynamo beat Atletico Madrid, led by Luis Aragones, 3–0. The second goal, scored by Oleg Blokhin, was especially memorable, as it was scored after the so-called "fan attack". Lobanovskyi's side was widely praised by the Soviet and European media. Many observers, fascinated by the quality of football shown by Dynamo Kyiv, called their style of play "football of the 21st century", and the side was labeled as "the team from another planet".

=== Co-managing Dynamo Kyiv and Soviet Union national team again (1986–1990) ===
Lobanovskyi's signature

Following success with Dynamo Kyiv in Cup Winners' Cup, Lobanovskyi was appointed manager of the national team for the third time. He was asked to manage the side on the eve of the 1986 World Cup. The main squad consisted almost exclusively of Dynamo Kyiv's players. In the group stage, Soviet players destroyed Hungary, scoring six unanswered goals, and drew with European champions, France, 1–1. The team confirmed the first place in the group by defeating Canada 2–0 with a B-squad. After an impressive performance, Lobanovskyi's side were predicted to be one of the favourites to win the tournament. In the first game of the knockout stage, however, Soviet team lost to Belgium in an extra-time, after Belgium scored two goals due to referee's mistakes.

At the conclusion of 1986 season, Dynamo Kyiv won the Soviet Top League for the 12th time (7th time during Lobanovskyi's time in charge of the club). Igor Belanov was rewarded with Ballon d'Or, becoming the second Kyiv's player to receive the award, while Oleksandr Zavarov ended up 6th. Overall, Dynamo Kyiv's players scored the most points during the award's voting process, just as they did in 1975.

In 1987, after defeating Beşiktaş twice in European Cup quarterfinals, Dynamo Kyiv extended their unbeaten streak in main UEFA club tournaments to 14 games, the longest unbeaten streak at the time. In the league Dynamo finished sixth but won the Soviet Cup and prestigious Dynamo Games of the USSR. Meanwhile, the Soviet team won its Euro 1988 qualifying group which consisted of East Germany and defending champions, France, as sbornaja famously defeated them 0–2 in Paris.

The national team achieved great success at the 1988 European Championship, winning silver medals. In every game, at least seven players of the starting line-up represented Dynamo Kyiv and at least eight Kyiv players entered the field (substitutions including; only two were allowed at the time). Sbornaja won its group, defeating Netherlands and England and drawing with Ireland. In semi-finals, Lobanovskyi's side defeated Italy, after Hennadiy Lytovchenko and Oleh Protasov (both Dynamo Kyiv's representatives) scored two unanswered goals. In the final, Soviet team met Netherlands again but was unable to repeat their previous victory from the group stage, losing 0–2. Van Basten's goal, in which he volleyed right-footed over Rinat Dasayev from the tightest of angles on the right of the penalty area, would later be described as one of the greatest goals in the history of the European Championships.

Following perestroika, many of Lobanovskyi's best players left the USSR to play in Western Europe. Going into the 1990 World Cup he could not call upon the best Soviet players. As a result, sbornaja finished on the bottom of their group. In the same year, which happened to be the final year of Lobanovskyi's career in Soviet Union, Dynamo Kyiv, which was going through generational change, won their fourth Soviet double. The team cemented first place in the Top League weeks before the end, winning its 13th league title and establishing themselves as the most successful Soviet football club of all time. In the Cup final, Lobanovskyi's team destroyed Lokomotiv Moscow 6–1. In the autumn of 1990, Lobanovskyi left Soviet Union to take a lucrative offer from United Arab Emirates.

=== Middle East (1990–1996) ===
In September 1990, Lobanovskyi decided to leave Soviet Union and take up a lucrative offer of managing the United Arab Emirates national football team. Lobanovskyi is recognized as one of the great managers in the history of the national team. During his four-year tenure, the team ended up fourth at the Asian Cup (losing bronze medal to South Korea in a penalty shootout), its best finish up to that date. He left Emirates due to a conflict with Emirates football federation and went on to spend the next two years managing the Kuwait national football team (winning a bronze medal at the Asian Games), before agreeing to return to Dynamo Kyiv in November 1996.

=== Third stint at Dynamo Kyiv (1997–2002) ===
In January 1997, Lobanovskyi returned to manage Dynamo Kyiv for the third time. The club by this time had fallen somewhat from their former heights. The club had been facing little opposition in Ukraine but had little success in European competitions, having been able to enter the Champions League first round only twice in the last five years. During its last European campaign before Lobanovsky's return, the team failed to qualify at the group stage of Champions League and was beaten by Neuchâtel Xamax in the first round of the UEFA Cup.

Within a month after Lobanovskyi's return, the team won the 1997 edition of the CIS Cup, defeating its biggest rival, Russian champion Spartak Moscow, in the final. The team won the 1996–97 Ukrainian league with 11 points gap against the second best team, Shakhtar Donetsk. At the start of the 1997–98 season, Dynamo Kyiv defeated Brøndby in the qualifying round of the Champions League and entered the group stage. Lobanovskyi's team were seeded against FC Barcelona, Newcastle United and PSV Eindhoven. The group was often described as the death group of the tournament. In the first two games, however, the team defeated PSV 1–3 in Eindhoven and drew with Newcastle. After that, Lobanovskyi's side defeated Barcelona, a generally recognized favourite, 3–0 in Kyiv in front of 100,000 fans. In the rematch two weeks later the Spanish team, which were coming off of an away victory against Real Madrid and were leading La Liga, lost the home game to Dynamo Kyiv 0–4, with Andriy Shevchenko scoring hat-trick in the first half. The Ukrainian team won their group after drawing with PSV 1–1. In quarterfinals, Dynamo faced Juventus. Lobanovskyi's side were able to draw the first game in Italy but were outclassed 1–4 in Ukraine. On the domestic field, the team won the league and Ukrainian Cup.

At the start of the 1998–99 season, Dynamo struggled to get through qualification. After beating Barry Town with an aggregate score 9–1, the team moved to the Champions League group stage after defeating Sparta Prague in a penalty shootout when both games ended 1–0 in favor of the away team. Dynamo were seeded against Arsenal, Racing Lens and Panathinaikos. The team lost its first game to Panathinaikos in Greece and then drew the home match with Lens, 1–1. Lobanovskyi's side then faced Arsenal at Wembley Stadium. In the second half, Andriy Shevchenko scored a goal that was cancelled due to offside. The replay, however, showed that the goal was valid. Instead, Dennis Bergkamp took Arsenal to the lead in the 72nd minute. In the 88th minute, Dynamo equalised after a strike from Serhiy Rebrov to the left corner of the net, and the match finished as a 1–1 draw. In the rematch against Arsenal two weeks later, Lobanovskyi's team won after Serhiy Rebrov, Oleksandr Holovko and Andriy Shevchenko took the team to the 3–0 lead and Stephen Hughes scored the only goal for Arsenal in the 82nd minute of the match. Dynamo then defeated Panathinaikos in Kyiv thanks to an own goal from Angelos Basinas. Before the final match, Dynamo, Panathinaikos and Racing Lens had 8 points, while Arsenal earned only 6 points. Panathinaikos lost the home game to Arsenal while the Ukrainian team was able to earn a 3–1 victory against Lens in France, win their group and move to quarter-finals.

In the play-offs, Lobanovskyi's team were seeded against the defending champions, Real Madrid. The first match at Santiago Bernabéu Stadium ended in a 1–1 draw. In the rematch in Kyiv, Dynamo won 2–0. All Kyiv's goals were scored by Andriy Shevchenko. To this day, Dynamo Kyiv remains the only team not from The Big 5 Leagues, Portugal and Netherlands to enter the Champions League semi-finals since non-champions of the top European leagues were eligible to compete in the competition for the first time. In semi-finals, the team faced Bayern Munich. In the first match in Ukraine, Dynamo were leading 3–1 after fifty minutes of the playing time and missed at least two promising opportunities to score the fourth goal. Instead, Stefan Effenberg reduced Kyiv's lead and Carsten Jancker equalised in the 88th minute. Bayern then won the second leg 1–0 and moved to the final. Andriy Shevchenko became Champions League's top goalscorer and received the UEFA Club Forward of the Year award. Shevchenko also ended up third in the 1999 Ballon d'Or voting process.

In the summer of 1999, Shevchenko was sold to AC Milan, while the team's captain Oleh Luzhnyi was transferred to Arsenal. Dynamo won the domestic double for the third consecutive season and ended their Champions League campaign in the second group stage. The team was able to finish second in the first group stage, in a group which consisted of S.S. Lazio, Bayer Leverkusen and Maribor, but ended up third behind Bayern Munich and Real Madrid in the next round, having earned 10 points.

Afterwards, Dynamo's second forward, Serhii Rebrov, was sold to Tottenham Hotspur and Kakha Kaladze was bought by AC Milan. With many key players sold, Dynamo Kyiv, which were also going through generational change, was not able to go past the first group stage in the next two seasons. Lobanovskyi won his last trophy in January 2002, when the team won its fourth CIS Cup, having entered the A-squad for the tournament for the first time since 1998. The team won all matches in the competition, defeating Spartak Moscow 4–3 in the final.

Lobanovskyi was appointed manager of the Ukraine national side in March 2000. Once again he was co-managing Dynamo Kyiv and the national team. Lobanovskyi left Ukraine national team after the side failed to qualify for the 2002 World Cup, losing to Germany in the play-offs.

Under his predecessor Yozhef Sabo, the national squad consisted almost exclusively of Dynamo Kyiv players. Lobanovskyi, despite his own obvious connection with Dynamo, initiated into the national squad many players outside of Dynamo. Anatoliy Tymoshchuk and Andriy Vorobey (from Shakhtar Donetsk), Dmytro Parfenov and Maksym Kalynychenko (from Spartak Moscow), Oleksandr Spivak (from Zenit St. Petersburg), Volodymyr Yezerskiy (from Dnipro) and Andriy Voronin (from Mainz) were all either initiated or given their first starting spots in the national team during his tenure. Together with the Dynamo generation of the late 1990s (Shevchenko, Rebrov, Husin, Vashchuk, Shovkovskyi) these players were to form, after Lobanovskyi's death, the core of the team that reached the 2006 World Cup quarter-finals – the first and only time Ukraine has ever qualified at the World Cup – managed by Oleh Blokhin who had worked under Lobanovskyi for 13 years as a Dynamo Kyiv and Soviet Union national team player.

== Death ==
Lobanovskyi's burial location and monument at Baikove cemetery in Kyiv

Lobanovskyi had to deal with health issues since 1988, when he suffered his first heart attack. Having come back from the Middle East in 1996, Lobanovskyi looked in a visibly worse shape. He suffered a second heart attack in the autumn of 2001, which required surgery. In 2001, Lobanovskyi missed all away games of Dynamo Kyiv in Champions League due to hypertension and being banned from travelling by air.

On 7 May 2002 during Dynamo Kyiv's game against FC Metalurh Zaporizhzhya, Lobanovskyi fainted and was hospitalized with a stroke. Lobanovskyi went through a brain surgery and his health was rated as critical. The press, which regularly monitored Lobanovsky's state of health, wrote that there was hope, but Valeriy Lobanovskyi had not regained consciousness. His heart stopped on 13 May at 8:35 pm. At the Champions League final in Glasgow two days later, UEFA held a minute's silence in his honour.

Lobanovskyi's funeral on 14 May 2002 was attended by the President of Ukraine Leonid Kuchma, Ukraine's Prime Minister Anatoliy Kinakh, other politicians, Lobanovskyi's former players Andriy Shevchenko, Oleh Blokhin, Igor Belanov, Oleksandr Zavarov, Serhiy Rebrov etc. In general, from 60.000 to 150.000 people attended the funeral.

Lobanovskyi was buried at Baikove Cemetery. The tombstone is adorned with a colonnade with the inscription in Russian We are alive as long as we are remembered (in original: Мы живы до тех пор, пока нас помнят).

== Management style and influence ==
Along with Rinus Michels, Lobanovskyi is recognized for being the inventor of the major football playing style known as "Total Football" in the 1970s. Lobanovskyi often referred to Total Football as "gold vein" that would be exploited for many years to come. According to Lobanovskyi, the "revolutionary process" in football ended in 1974 with the discovery of Total Football, and in modern football, all players must be able to play in offense and defense equally effectively. Per Lobanovskyi, "Now we are talking about the so-called 'smart' universalization. What do I mean? Well, for example, we would not want Andriy Shevchenko, the striker, to play the right defender. But if he gets into this zone, he must be able to perform there. And in the future, football will gradually move from 'smart' universalization to full universalization".

Lobanovskyi viewed football game as a system of 22 elements, divided into two sub-systems consisted of 11 elements – if the two sub-systems are equal, the game ends in a draw. The nuance that Lobanovsky considered the most interesting and important was that the efficiency of the subsystem will always be higher than the sum of the efficiencies of its individual elements. Lobanovskyi insisted that the training process should be modeled, and fragments of future actions on the field should be practiced. According to Lobanovskyi, team coordination was an outdated concept – each player goes out and does what is needed at this time, and how he does this depends on his skill, training, and ability to express himself. But the structure of the game, tactics should not suffer from who acts as a performer in that particular moment.

Lobanovskyi is credited for bringing a scientific and analytical approach and strong emphasis on physical fitness and diet to the game. Many observers recognized Lobanovskyi as the first person to bring science into football, at the time when most managers used basic attributes in their training process. The media often referred to Lobanovskyi as "ahead of his time". With the cooperation with Anatoly Zelentsov, a scientist from the department of physical education theory of Kyiv State Institute of Physical Education, Lobanovskyi brought an accurate system of calculation of the training process and mathematical modeling of physical load for players. Zelentsov, viewed by many as unmistakably meticulous in his analysis, insisted that the team would not lose the match if, during the game, the number of key moments, during which the team made mistakes, would not exceed 18%. Many observers, players and managers credited Lobanovskyi's teams for being in great physical condition and being able to fulfill tactical ideas and perform certain operations almost on the level of automatism. Many observers described football played by Lobanovskyi's teams as "football from the future". In 2016, UEFA featured Lobanovskyi among ten coaches recognised for their major impact on football since 1954, describing him as "the soccer scientist".

A lot of people that worked alongside Lobanovskyi described him as a great psychologist. "A coach should always remember that he works with people, people that largely make the coach what he is now. And people, unlike robots, have a soul that is quite often very vulnerable, and sometimes obstinate", Lobanovskyi once said in an interview, "It's really important to know each player's personality and character. You can be more strict with one player and less strict with another, but for that you need to know their character. You must know which buttons to press to have each player bring as much benefit as possible". Stefan Reshko, who played for Dynamo Kyiv in the 70s, said: "Lobanovskyi was a top-notch psychologist. He had the ability to get the absolute best out of the players he worked with. Anatoliy Demyanenko, trained by Lobanovskyi during the 80s, described him as "a great psychologist. He knew how to communicate with each player. He knew when and to whom he needs to raise his voice, or not to say anything". Vasyl Kardash, who worked with Lobanovskyi during the late 90s and early 00s, said: "Lobanovskyi was a very good psychologist. His understanding of the psychology of a certain player – not just as a footballer, but as a human being – [is one of the things that] made him one of the great ones". Andriy Shevchenko often referred to Lobanovskyi as "paternal figure" in his life, claiming that Lobanovskiy "handed him the key" to a successful life: "Lobanovskyi rarely raised his voice. He never yelled at us, nor he ever tried to 'sort things out' with anyone. He was respected and admired by everyone around him". Renowned Indian manager Armando Colaco is highly influenced by Lobanovskyi and his style of coaching in Dynamo Kiev.

Many observers, players and managers credited Lobanovskyi for being able to always improve as a manager. One of the famous Lobanovskyi quotes was, "A coach must learn all his life. If hardened, stopped learning – that means, stopped being a coach". His ability to "stay in touch" with modern trends has been described as one of the reasons why he was able to build three great football teams in a span of three different decades – the 70s, 80s and 90s.

== Tactics ==
Lobanovskyi placed emphasis on the collective or "the system". He said "A system does not guarantee success, but it gives a much better chance of success than making it up as you go along." Everything was meticulously planned, with the team's preparation divided into three levels. Players were to have individual technical coaching so as to equip them better to fulfil the tasks Lobanovskyi set them during a game; specific tactics and tasks for each player were drawn up according to the opponents; and a strategy was devised for a competition as a whole, placing each game in context by acknowledging that it is impossible for a side to maintain maximal levels over a protracted period. Lobanovskyi and Zelentsov wrote in their book, The Methodological Basis of the Development of Training Models, "the first thing we have in mind is to strive for new courses of action that will not allow the opponent to adapt to our style of play. If an opponent has adjusted himself to our style of play and found a counter-play, then we need to find a new strategy. That is the dialectic of the game. You have to go forward in such a way and with such a range of attacking options that it will force the opponent to make a mistake. In other words, it's necessary to force the opponent into the condition you want them to be in. One of the most important means of doing that is to vary the size of the playing area." One thing remained central: keep the preferred playing area as large as possible while in possession, and as small as possible while the opponent had the ball.

In Methodological Basis, Lobanovskyi and Zelentsov give as an example of their preparation for a specific game the European Cup semi-final against Bayern Munich in 1977. ‘The play,’ they wrote, ‘was constructed on attacking actions, with the obligatory neutralisation of the opponent's players, the intention being to deprive him playing space and to defend against the attacks from wide at which Bayern were so strong. The objective was a draw, but we ended up losing 1–0. In the match in Kyiv, we chose a playing model based on squeezing the play and fighting for the ball in our opponents’ half of the pitch, trying to create a numerical advantage in various areas. Eventually we won 2–0.’

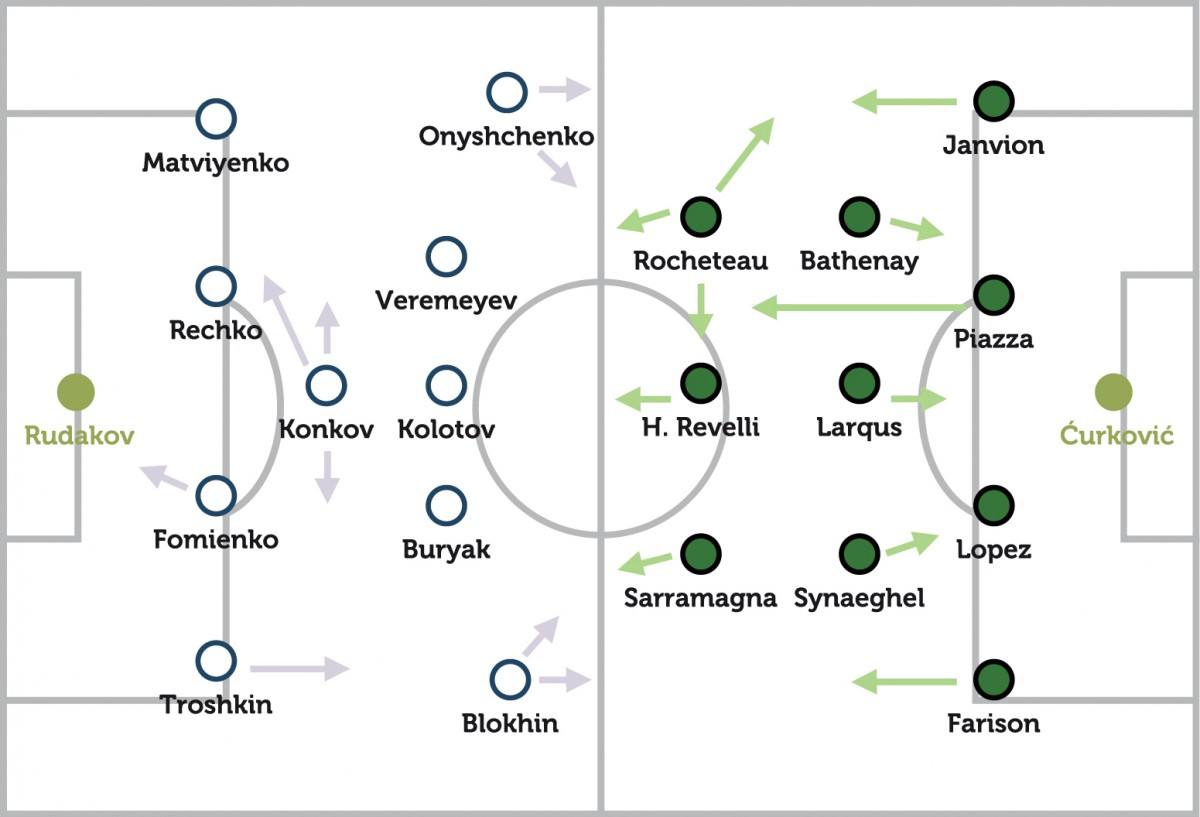
In the 1975–76 European Cup games against Saint-Étienne, Dynamo's formation featured no proper centre-forward, as strikers Blokhin and Onyshchenko constantly played on the flanks, with midfielders Leonid Buryak, Viktor Kolotov and Volodymyr Veremeyev exploiting the central space as deep-lying forwards, anticipating the false nine position.

Lobanovskyi's preferable formation was the 4–1–3–2. All his teams used the talents of two strikers, in 1975 Oleh Blokhin and Volodymyr Onyshchenko, in 1986 Blokhin or Oleh Protasov and Ihor Belanov, and in 1999 Andriy Shevchenko and Serhiy Rebrov. Lobanovskyi's forwards were highly versatile, being equally capable of shifting to the flanks, organizing attacks as playmakers, joining midfield in defensive formations and even dropping back to help the full-backs during spells of opponent pressure. This versatility of the forwards was key in disorganizing opponents' defenses and creating space for players attacking from the back.

Pressing was always a key element of Lobanovskyi's teams. The main goal of pressing was to create situations of numerical superiority for Dynamo players where the ball was, and deny opponents both space and time for the right decisions, thus forcing them to always play the game at Dynamo's pace. The trademark Dynamo counter-attacks would start with a player dispossessing his opponent in midfield, then immediately playing a quick long ball either to the forwards or the advancing full-backs, so as to catch the opposition unorganized. Lobanovskyi always stressed the importance of the first seconds of an attack after winning the ball, as it is in these seconds that the opposition is less ready to defend in an organized manner. Pressing was a collective effort, and whenever a player moved up the pitch, a teammate covered his position. In this way Dynamo minimized the threat of having to face a counter-attack by the opponent in case the ball was lost.

Lobanovskyi put meticulous attention to set-pieces both in attack and in defense. In defense, Dynamo often used tactical fouling to prevent opponents from getting quality shots on goal, frequently conceding fouls just at the top of the penalty area. The logic behind this was that free kicks were much easier for the goalkeeper to defend that shots in open play. In addition, they also used tactical fouling to prevent counter attacks: by fouling around the halfway line Dynamo's midfield could get behind the ball to defend. In attack, Lobanovskyi's teams also were intelligent in their use of playing short from free kicks. During the 1990s, most teams would habitually play the ball long after a foul, using the opportunity to progress up the field as quick as possible. Dynamo recognized that opponents would prepare for this and retreat accordingly. Therefore when they played short, there was no pressure applied to the player with the ball for a long duration, allowing for runs to develop. Dynamo's first two goals in the 3–0 victory against Barcelona in 1997 came from such situations. The high degree of responsiveness and fast reaction speeds were traits to marvel at of Lobanovskyi's side, as they frequently looked to increase the tempo and take advantage of teams that used these moments in the game to slow down the match. When Dynamo had won a throw next to the opponents' area, the tallest midfielder (Andriy Husin) would usually stand just inside the area to receive the ball from the throw and make a header-pass to one of the strikers to create a chance. In this way Dynamo scored the 2–0 against Bayern Munich in 2000, when Ramiz Mamedov launched a throw straight into Husin's head, Husin flicked on a header-pass to Giorgi Demetradze in the penalty spot, who scored with an overhead kick.

Dynamo's shape in the late 1990s was a front two of Rebrov and Shevchenko but as an offensive principle they always attacked three lanes: right, left and center. It didn't matter what the shape was or who it was, there were always three players attacking the three lanes. This was split into two methods, the first being a player attacking one of the wide lanes as one of Rebrov or Shevchenko was central. That player was mostly Belkevich who not only operated behind the striker duo but also attacked the wide areas regularly. The second method was Rebrov and Shevchenko splitting, therefore allowing a runner in between.

In the "stretched diamond" formation, which differs from a typical diamond in that one player operates in a much wider position than the others, Lobanovskyi was able to fully make use of the talents of versatile midfielder Vitaliy Kosovskyi, who was effectively both a left midfielder in the "standard" 4–1–3–2 and a left winger next to Shevchenko and Rebrov when attacks unfolded, practically making the formation a 4–3–3. When defending, Kosovskyi's speed made him useful also as a left back, enabling the actual left back Kakha Kaladze to drop inside as a third central defender, converting the formation into a 5–3–2. In the absence of Kosovskyi due to injury during the second half of the 1999–2000 season, Lobanovskyi used Giorgi Demetradze as a wide striker. Against Real Madrid at the Bernabeu, Demetradze was instructed to exploit the space in Madrid's defense left open by full-back Roberto Carlos' forward runs. In this game, Demetradze won a penalty (that Rebrov missed), won the corner for Dynamo's equalizer, and finally crossed for Dynamo's second goal that made it 1–2.

Dynamo's defending was usually organized as a mixed zonal-and-man-marking system; players would usually defend zonally yet the opposition's best player was in most cases man-marked by a Dynamo player who tracked him back whenever he went. Perhaps the most significant application of the tracking back was against Real Madrid in the 1999 Champions League quarter-finals at the Santiago Bernabeu. Alyaksandr Khatskevich's role was to defend the right channel and center area as Predrag Mijatović drifted inside to overload the center. He also had Oleksiy Mykhaylychenko man-mark Holland's Ruud Gullit in the Euro 1988 final.

Lobanovskyi was tactically versatile and would make risky changes during matches to alter the course of the game. In December 1998, Dynamo was playing away at RC Lens needing a draw to qualify as first from their Champions League group. Lobanovskyi chose a defensive-minded deployment, with Rebrov posted on the left wing and the midfield consisting of defense-oriented players, being effectively a 4–5–1 with Shevchenko as the lone striker. However, after Lens captain Frédéric Déhu was sent off for a hard challenge on Shevchenko with the score at 0–0, Lobanovskyi quickly made two offensive-minded changes, bringing in Vitaliy Kosovskyi for defender Yuriy Dmytrulin and Valentin Belkevich for Vasyl Kardash and pairing Rebrov with Shevchenko up front, thus changing the system into a 3–2–3–2. Dynamo won the game 3–1, also winning the group to advance to the quarter-finals.

He insisted that a player should be able to play in more than one position. He converted Aleksei Gerasimenko, originally a striker who had scored 46 goals in 71 games with FC Kuban Krasnodar, into a right midfielder, a right full-back, and even into a sweeper. Likewise, central defender Oleksandr Holovko was also good when he joined midfield, and Kakha Kaladze was equally adept as left back, defensive midfielder and centre back.

Lobanovskyi's emphasis on the system rather than the individuals meant that his teams continued to perform well even when their best players were lost to transfers, injuries or bookings. In the 1997–98 season Dynamo's two most important midfielders were Yuriy Kalitvintsev and Yuriy Maksymov, who left the team in the end of the year. Lobanovskyi had already found their replacements in Alyaksandr Khatskevich and Valentin Belkevich, and the team made an even more spectacular run next season. In the second half of the 1999–2000 season the team was plagued with injuries in key players Vladyslav Vashchuk, Yuriy Dmytrulin and Vitaliy Kosovskyi, and was forced to play important Champions League games against Real Madrid, Bayern Munich and Rosenborg BK with a defensive line consisting of youngsters Andriy Nesmachniy and Serhiy Fedorov and with Gerasimenko playing as a sweeper, way out of his natural position. Despite all this, Dynamo were able to collect 10 points in these 4 matches, beating Rosenborg twice, Bayern once and drawing 2–2 with Real at the Santiago Bernabeu Stadium.

== Remembrance ==
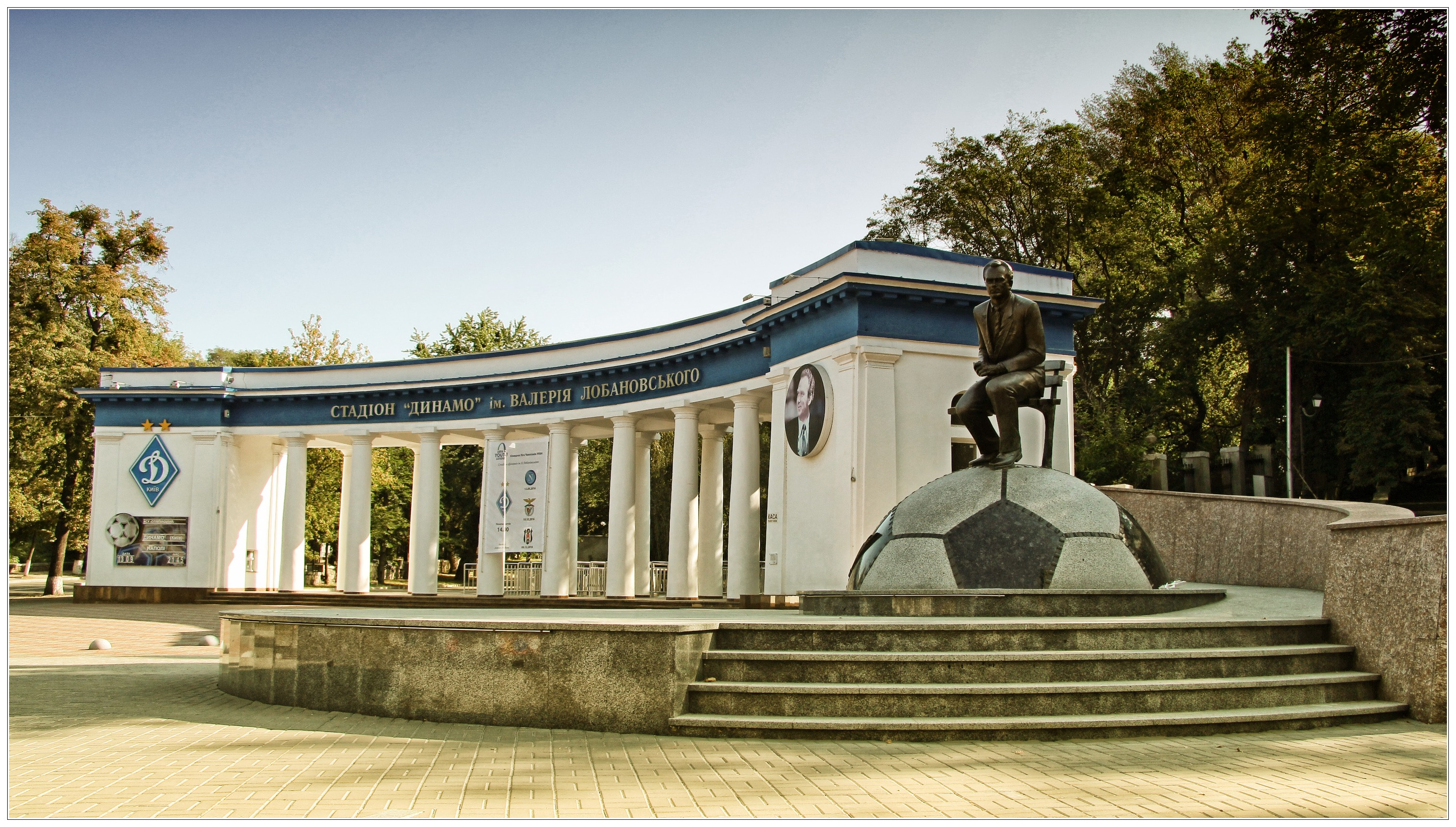
Monument to Lobanovskyi near the main entrance to the Dynamo Stadium in Kyiv

Following his death Lobanovskyi was awarded the Hero of Ukraine order, the nation's highest honour, as well as the UEFA Order of Merit in Ruby. Dynamo Kyiv's stadium was also renamed the Lobanovsky Stadium in his honour. In 2003, Lobanovskyi was awarded FIFA Order of Merit, the highest honour awarded by FIFA.

On 11 May 2003, before the first anniversary of the death of Lobanovskyi, a monument was opened near the Lobanovsky Dynamo Stadium.

After his death, A.C. Milan won the Champions League in 2003 with Andriy Shevchenko in the team. After the victory Shevchenko flew to Kyiv to put his medal by the grave of his former manager.

In 2003, the Valeriy Lobanovskyi Memorial Tournament was founded.

== Personal life ==
Lobanovskyi was born in Kyiv to Vasyl Mykhailovych Lobko-Lobanovsky and Oleksandra Maksymivna Boichenko. Lobanovskyi's daughter Svitlana Lobanovska told Newspaper in Ukrainian that Vasyl Lobko-Lobanovsky had a double surname but double surnames were not welcome in the USSR, therefore his both sons, Valeriy and Yevhen, decided to use single surname Lobanovsky.

Lobanovskyi was married to Ada Lobanovska, the couple had a daughter named Svitlana. She is a philologist of the Russian language and owns a restaurant in Kyiv called "U metrá" ("At The Metr"; "Metr" (ukr. Метр) was one of Lobanovskyi's many nicknames).

== Career statistics ==
=== As a manager ===
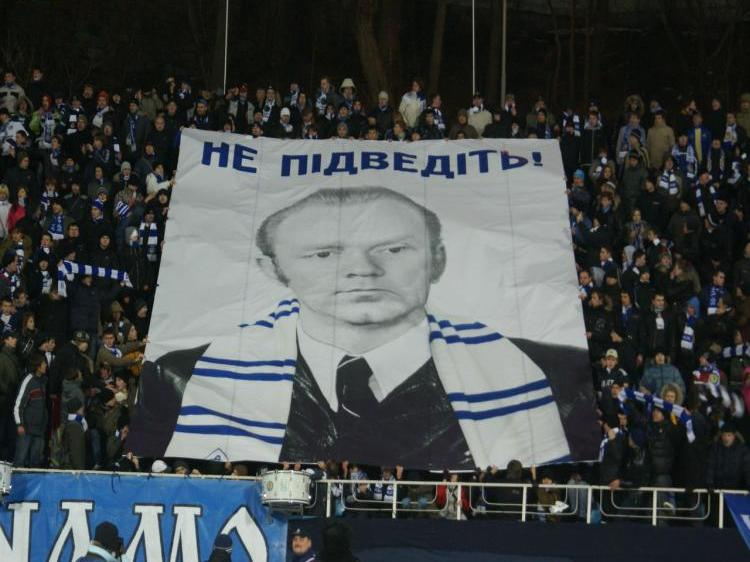
Portrait of Valeriy Lobanovskyi on the banner of Dynamo Kyiv's fans, 2 March 2008

=== Managerial statistics ===
As of 26 February 2024.

| Team | Nation | From | To | Record | | | | | | | |
| Team | Nation | From | To | G | W | D | L | F | A | GD | Win % |
|---|---|---|---|---|---|---|---|---|---|---|---|
| FC Dnipro | Soviet Union | 31 October 1968 | 19 October 1973 | 206 | 104 | 51 | 51 | 305 | 191 | +114 | 50.49 |
| FC Dynamo Kiev | Soviet Union | 20 October 1973 | 12 October 1982 | 406 | 230 | 112 | 64 | 652 | 294 | +355 | 56.65 |
| Soviet Union | Soviet Union | 1 April 1975 | 31 July 1976 | 19 | 11 | 4 | 4 | 33 | 18 | +15 | 57.89 |
| Soviet Union | Soviet Union | 12 October 1982 | 14 November 1983 | 10 | 6 | 3 | 1 | 18 | 6 | +12 | 60 |
| FC Dynamo Kiev | Soviet Union | 1 January 1984 | 30 September 1990 | 269 | 135 | 83 | 51 | 451 | 238 | +211 | 50.56 |
| Soviet Union | Soviet Union | 1986 | 1987 | 17 | 9 | 6 | 2 | 31 | 11 | +20 | 52.94 |
| Soviet Union | Soviet Union | 1988 | 1990 | 31 | 16 | 6 | 9 | 42 | 29 | +13 | 51.61 |
| UAE | United Arab Emirates | 1 October 1990 | 31 December 1992 | 19 | 7 | 8 | 5 | 20 | 19 | +11 | 36.84 |
| Kuwait | Kuwait | 1 July 1994 | 31 December 1996 | 41 | 17 | 11 | 13 | 64 | 49 | +15 | 41.46 |
| FC Dynamo Kiev | Ukraine | 1 January 1997 | 13 May 2002 | 271 | 190 | 47 | 32 | 629 | 195 | +436 | 70.11 |
| Ukraine | Ukraine | 2 March 2000 | 15 November 2001 | 18 | 6 | 7 | 5 | 20 | 20 | 0 | 33.33 |
| Total | | | | 1,307 | 741 | 344 | 233 | 2,275 | 1,060 | +1,215 | 56.22 |

== Honours ==
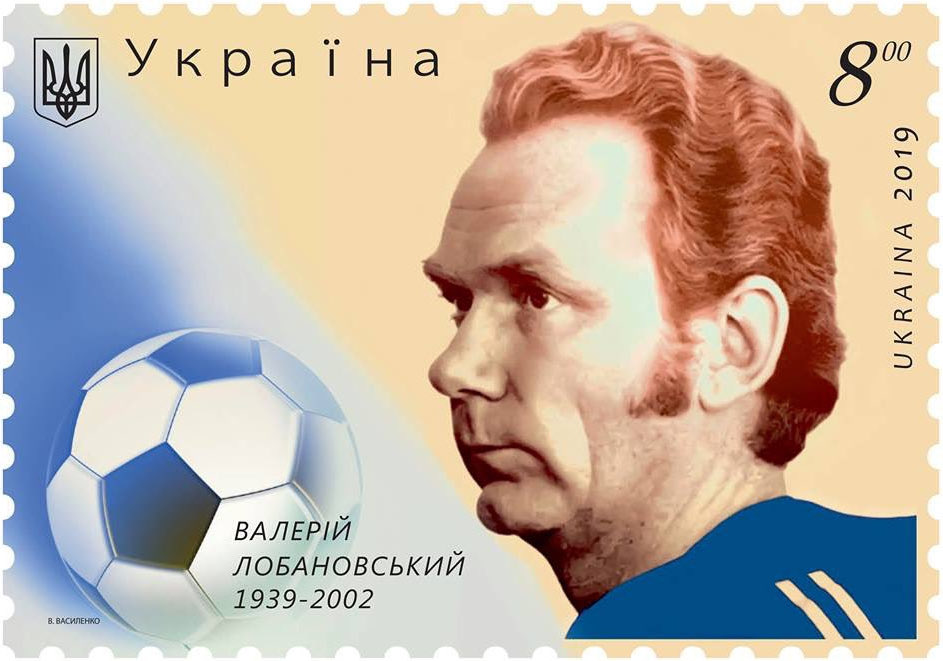
Lobanovskyi on a 2019 stamp of Ukraine

=== Player ===
Dynamo Kyiv

- Soviet Top League (1): 1961
- Soviet Cup (1): 1964

=== Manager ===
Dnipro Dnipropetrovsk

- Soviet First League (1): 1971

Dynamo Kyiv

- Soviet Top League (8): 1974, 1975, 1977, 1980, 1981, 1985, 1986, 1990
- Soviet Cup (6): 1974, 1978, 1982, 1985, 1987, 1990
- Soviet Super Cup (3): 1980, 1985, 1986
- Tournament of the Soviet society "Dynamo" (1): 1987
- Ukrainian National League (5): 1997, 1998, 1999, 2000, 2001
- Ukrainian Cup (3): 1998, 1999, 2000
- European Cup Winners' Cup (2): 1975, 1986
- European Super Cup (1): 1975; runner-up: 1986
- Commonwealth of Independent States Cup (3): 1997, 1998, 2002

Soviet Union

- UEFA European Championship runner-up: 1988
- Summer Olympic Games bronze medal: 1976

Ukrainian SSR

- Spartakiad of Peoples bronze medal: 1979

Kuwait

- Asian Games bronze medal: 1994
- Arabian Gulf Cup (1): 1996

=== Individual ===
- Guerin Sportivo Manager of the Year: 1986 (2nd place)
- Ukrainian Manager of the Season (5 times): 1996–97, 1997–98, 1998–99, 1999–00, 2001–02 (posthumously)
- European Football Coach of the Year: 1986, 1988, 1999
- European Football Coach of the Season: 1985–86
- Greatest Manager of All Time – one of 5 managers ranked top 10 by France Football, World Soccer and ESPN
  - 6th place (France Football): 2019
  - 6th place (World Soccer): 2013
  - 8th place (ESPN): 2013
  - 10th place (FourFourTwo): 2023
- Most successful manager of the 20th century, with 30 trophies (FourFourTwo)
- Ukrainian Footballer of the Year: 1962, 1963, 1964
- IFFHS World's Best Club Coach:
  - 4th place (1997)
  - 6th place (1998)
  - 9th place (1999)

=== Orders and further honours ===
- Hero of Ukraine, Order of the State: 2002
- Order of Merit (Ukraine), Class II: 1998
- Order of Merit (Ukraine), Class III: 1998
- Order of the Badge of Honour: 1971
- Order of the Red Banner of Labour: 1987
- Medal "In Commemoration of the 1500th Anniversary of Kyiv": 1982
- FIFA Order of Merit: 2002
- UEFA Order of Merit in Ruby: 2002

== See also ==
- National team managers with 100 or more matches
- List of football managers with the most matches
