= Gennadi Bogachyov =

Gennadi Bogachyov may refer to:

- Gennadi Bogachyov (footballer)
- Gennadi Bogachyov (actor)
