= Conservative Party of Russia =

Conservative Party of Russia Консервативная партия России
- Abbreviation: CPR (English); КПР (Russian)
- First leader: Lev Ubozhko (1989-2003)
- Last leader: Yuriy Tegin or Nikolay Bogachyov (2003-2005)
- Founded: 13 January 1989; 37 years ago (as Democratic Party); 7 October 1990; 35 years ago
- Dissolved: April 2005; 20 years ago
- Split from: Democratic Union
- Headquarters: Moscow, Russia
- Ideology: Conservatism; Liberal conservatism Anti-communism
- Political position: Centre-right to right-wing
- Colours: White; Light blue
- Slogan: "Education, Health, Love" (Russian: «Образование, здоровье, любовь»)

Website
- kpr.ru

The Conservative Party of Russia (CPR; Russian: Консервативная партия России; КПР; Konservativnaya partiya Rossii, KPR), initially Democratic Party (DP; Russian: Демократическая партия; ДП; Demokraticheskaya partiya, DP) was a conservative political party in Russia that operated in Russia from 1990 to 2005, founded by Lev Ubozhko (who died in 2003). Its political orientation was based on conservatism, human rights and the rights of the individual, anti-communism, as well as the strengthening of national traditions. Nikolay Bogachyov became chairman of the party in September 2003, following Ubozhko's death.

== History ==
The Conservative Party of Russia was founded in 1990, and in 1999 it was renamed the Conservative Movement of Russia. In 1991, 1996, and 2000, the party nominated a candidate, Lev Ubozhko, for the Russian presidential elections, but he failed to register due to insufficient signatures.

In 1993 and 1995, the Conservative Party collected signatures for the State Duma election campaigns but failed to gather enough. The party participated in the 1999 Russian legislative election, receiving the number one spot on the ballot, attracting media attention. It failed to gain a seat in the State Duma, receiving only 0.13% of the vote.

In 2003, after Ubozhko's death, a split began to emerge within the party. The new party leader, Yuri Tegin, failed to secure a spot in the elections. Tegin was removed from his post as chairman, and a protracted dispute between the old and new party leadership began.

The Conservative Party was deregistered in 2005 due to insufficient membership.
