= Oleksiy Mykhaylychenko =

Ukrainian footballer and football coach (born 1963)

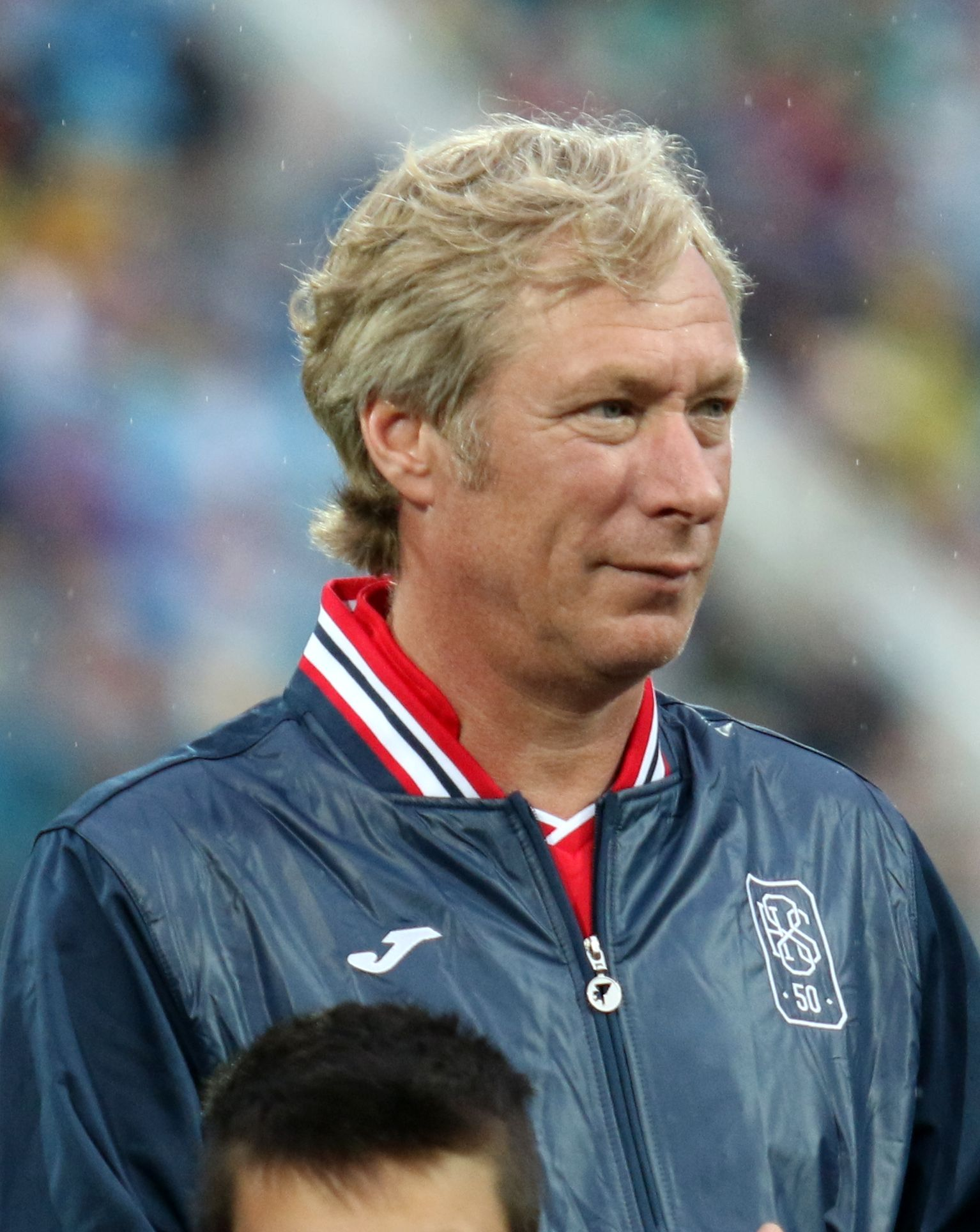
- Oleksiy Mykhaylychenko in 2016

Personal information
- Full name: Oleksiy Oleksandrovych Mykhaylychenko
- Date of birth: 30 March 1963 (age 63)
- Place of birth: Kyiv, Ukrainian SSR, Soviet Union
- Height: 1.86 m (6 ft 1 in)
- Position: Attacking midfielder

Team information
- Current team: Dynamo Kyiv (sportive director)

Youth career
- 1973–1981: Dynamo Kyiv

Senior career*
Years	Team	Apps	(Gls)
1981–1990	Dynamo Kyiv	137	(39)
1990–1991	Sampdoria	24	(3)
1991–1996	Rangers	110	(20)
Total		271	(62)

International career
1986–1988	USSR (Olympic)	14	(7)
1987–1991	USSR	36	(9)
1992	CIS	5	(0)
1992–1994	Ukraine	2	(0)

Managerial career
- 2002–2004: Dynamo Kyiv
- 2004–2008: Ukraine U21
- 2008–2009: Ukraine
- 2011–2013: Dynamo Kyiv (sporting director)
- 2012–2013: Dynamo Kyiv (assistant)
- 2013–2019: Dynamo Kyiv (sporting director)
- 2019–2020: Dynamo Kyiv
- 2020–2021: Dynamo Kyiv (sporting director)
Medal record
Men's football
Representing Soviet Union
UEFA European Championship
Runner-up	1988 West Germany
Summer Olympics
Gold medal – first place	1988 Seoul	Team
Representing Ukraine (as manager)
UEFA European Under-21 Championship
Runner-up	2006 Portugal
- * Club domestic league appearances and goals

Oleksiy Oleksandrovych Mykhaylychenko (Ukrainian: Олексі́й Олекса́ндрович Михайличе́нко; born 30 March 1963) is a Ukrainian football coach and former professional player. He is a Distinguished Master of Sports of the USSR and a Distinguished Coach of Ukraine. During his playing days he was a versatile midfielder known for his stamina and passing capability. Also noted for his technique, Mykhaylychenko usually played as attacking midfielder.

Mykhaylychenko currently holds an administrative position at his home club, Dynamo Kyiv, as director of sport. His name is commonly romanised as Alexei Mikhailichenko from the Russian spelling of his name (Алексей Александрович Михайличенко).

Mykhaylychenko played for Dynamo Kyiv, Sampdoria and Rangers. He then became a coach, starting with assistant coach to Dynamo Kyiv's legendary Valeriy Lobanovsky. Following the death of Lobanovsky, Mykhaylychenko replaced him as head coach. In 2004, he took charge of the Ukraine's national under-21 team. He was head coach of the Ukraine national football team senior side for two years after that.

== Club career ==
Mykhaylychenko began his football career in the youth system of Dynamo Kyiv, under the guidance of Anatoliy Byshovets. He made his debut in the Soviet Top League in 1981, and went on to have a great career with Dynamo, winning four championships and three runner-up medals. He also won the Soviet Cup three times. His biggest success with Dynamo came when they won the 1985–86 European Cup Winners' Cup. He was awarded the Soviet Footballer of the Year award in 1988, as well as two Ukrainian Footballer of the Year awards in 1987 and 1988. In 1990, he was signed by the Italian club Sampdoria, who won their first Serie A title that season.

The following season he moved to play with the Scottish Premier Division team Rangers, uniting with fellow Ukrainian and Dynamo Kyiv teammate Oleh Kuznetsov, although the defender had a long-term injury problem and they only played together 20 times in Scotland. His first season at Ibrox was undoubtedly his most successful, as they completed the double of the Premier Division title and Scottish Cup and Mykhaylychenko was a regular in the side with 10 goals from 27 league games. He featured in 29 league games as Rangers won a domestic treble a year later, but managed just five goals. He was an even more frequent selection in the first team during 1993–94, playing 34 games, but again scored only five times.

Despite being very successful as a creative and technical central midfielder earlier in his career, at Rangers he was often deployed on the left wing with less impact as manager Walter Smith preferred a 4–4–2 formation with more combative players in the central roles. Then came the arrival of wide man Brian Laudrup, whose presence in the team restricted Mykhaylychenko to a mere nine league appearances and two goals in 1994–95. He made 11 goalless league appearances in the 1995–96 (during which Wolverhampton Wanderers made an unsuccessful approach for him) and remained in Glasgow until retiring from playing in May 1996 at the age of 33.

With Rangers, Mykhaylychenko managed to win another five league winner's medals. All-in-all he won championship medals in three different nations, and for seven consecutive seasons – USSR in 1990, Italy in 1991 and Scotland from 1992 to 1996.

== International career ==
At national level, in 1983 Mykhaylychenko took part in the 'Summer Spartakiad of the Peoples of the USSR' in the team of Ukrainian Republic team.

Mykhaylychenko was capped 36 times (scoring nine goals) for the USSR. His first game for the Soviet team was on 29 April 1987 at home against East Germany. He won the gold medal at the 1988 Summer Olympics, and was part of the silver medal-winning Soviet squad at Euro 1988, but injury deprived him of a place in the FIFA World Cup 1990 squad and he was sorely missed as the Soviets crashed out in the first round.

Mykhaylychenko also played at the Euro 1992 championship with the CIS (appearing for the interim team five times in total) and afterwards played twice for Ukraine, making his debut on 28 October 1992 against Belarus, aged 29.

== Coaching ==
After retiring from playing in 1996, Mykhaylychenko went back to Ukraine to begin coaching under the legendary Kyiv manager Valeri Lobanovsky, remaining his assistant for five years. When Lobanovsky died in 2002, Mykhaylychenko took over as caretaker manager before assuming full control of the team in the 2002–03 season. Mikhailichenko led the team to two league titles and the 2003 Ukrainian Cup, but was replaced in August 2004. In 2004, he became the head coach of the Ukraine under-21 team. In that capacity he led the team to the final of the 2006 European Championship, which they lost to Netherlands.

On 16 June 2006, it was reported that Mikhailichenko would take over as head coach of Scottish Premier League club, Heart of Midlothian. Hearts did not follow up their reported interest and instead appointed caretaker Valdas Ivanauskas on a full-time basis. Mikhailichenko was announced as head coach of the Ukraine national team on 11 January 2008. After Mikhailichenko's contract expired on in December 2009 the Football Federation of Ukraine did not renew the contract after the national team failed to qualify for the 2010 World Cup in South Africa.

Mykhaylychenko took over again as head coach of Dynamo Kyiv in August 2019. He was released from his duties on 20 July 2020, after winning the Ukrainian Cup and reaching second place in the championship. The club's official website cited playing level and the lack of progress as main reasons for his departure.

In May 2021, became vice-president of the Ukrainian Association of Football, promoted by the commander of Andriy Pavelka, who will be pratsyuvati in the UAF.

== Career statistics ==
=== International ===
Soviet Union national team
Year	Apps	Goals
1987	6	1
1988	12	3
1989	5	1
1990	4	2
1991	9	2
Total	36	9

CIS national team
Year	Apps	Goals
1992	5	0

Ukraine national team
Year	Apps	Goals
1992	1	0
1993	0	0
1994	1	0
Total	2	0

=== International goals ===
Score and results list Soviet Union's goal tally first

Goal	Date	Venue	Opponent	Score	Result	Competition
1.	9 September 1987	Central Lenin Stadium, Moscow	France	1–1	1–1	UEFA Euro 1988 qualifying
2.	18 June 1988	Waldstadion, Frankfurt	England	2–1	3–1	UEFA Euro 1988
3.	19 October 1988	Republican Stadium, Kyiv	Austria	1–0	2–0	1990 FIFA World Cup qualification
4.	23 November 1988	Adailiya Stadium, Kuwait City	Kuwait	0–1	0–1	Friendly
5.	10 May 1989	Ali Sami Yen Stadium, Istanbul	Turkey	0–1	0–1	1990 FIFA World Cup qualification
6.	16 May 1990	Ramat Gan Stadium, Ramat Gan	Israel	2–2	3–2	Friendly
7.	29 August 1990	Luzhniki Stadium, Moscow	Romania	1–2	1–2	Friendly
8.	17 April 1991	Népstadion, Budapest	Hungary	0–1	0–1	UEFA Euro 1992 qualifying
9.	29 May 1991	Central Lenin Stadium, Moscow	Cyprus	2–0	4–0	UEFA Euro 1992 qualifying

== Honours ==
Olympic medal record

Men's football
Gold medal – first place	1988 Seoul	Team

=== Club ===
==== Dynamo Kyiv ====
- Soviet Top League: 1985, 1986, 1990
- Soviet Cup: 1985, 1987, 1990
- European Cup Winners' Cup: 1985–86

==== Sampdoria ====
- Italian Serie A: 1990–91

==== Rangers ====
- Scottish Premier Division: 1991–92, 1992–93, 1993–94, 1994–95, 1995–96 1996-97 1997-98
- Scottish Cup: 1991–92
- Scottish League Cup: 1992–93, 1993–94

=== International ===
==== Soviet Union ====
- Olympic champion: Gold Medal 1988
- European Football Championship Runner-up: 1988

=== Individual ===
- Ukrainian Footballer of the Year: 1987, 1988
- Soviet Footballer of the Year: 1988
- ADN Eastern European Footballer of the Season: 1988
- Ballon d'Or:
  - 1988 – 4th
  - 1989 – 12th
  - 1991 – 21st
- Top 32 footballers who won Olympic gold medals by FourFourTwo

=== Manager ===
==== Dynamo Kyiv ====
- Ukrainian Premier League: 2002–03, 2003–04
  - Runner-up 2001–02, 2019–20
- Ukrainian Cup: 2002–03, 2019–20
- Ukrainian Super Cup: 2004

==== Ukraine under-21s ====
- UEFA Under-21 Championship: runner-up 2006

=== State ===
- Order of Merit 1st class (May 13, 2016)
- Order of Merit 2nd class (August 19, 2006)
- Order of Merit 3rd class (2004)
