= 1986–87 Soviet Cup =

1986–87 Cup of USSR in Football
Кубок СССР

Tournament details
- Country: Soviet Union
- Dates: May 2, 1986 – June 14, 1987
- Teams: 80 ▲

Final positions
- Champions: Dinamo Kiev
- Runners-up: Dinamo Minsk

The 1986–87 Soviet Cup was an association football cup competition of the Soviet Union. The winner of the competition, Dinamo Kiev qualified for the continental tournament.

== Competition overview ==
Compared with the last year competition, the number of participants has increased from 74 to 80 teams that will take part in the games for the 1986/87 USSR Cup, including 16 from the Top, 24 from the First and 40 from the Second leagues, which is represented by the best teams of its nine (9) zones based on the final standings at the end of the 1985 season: from 1st to zones 5 teams (including last year's winner of the RSFSR Cup "Krasnaya Presnya", Moscow), from zones 2, 3, 4, 5, 7, 8 and 9 - 4 teams each, from zone 6 - 7 teams.

The games of the 1/64 finals, which will begin on May 3, will feature 40 teams from the Second and 24 teams from the First league. From the 1/16 finals, Top league teams are included in the draw. The quarter-finals, semi-finals and finals will take place next spring. Starting from the 1/32 finals, the venues for games in pairs are determined by the number of games on home and away fields. The team with more trips has an advantage. In case of equality of receptions and departures, the location of the next game is determined by lot.

If the game, including the final, ends in a draw, extra time is assigned - two halves of 15 minutes each. If extra time does not reveal the strongest, the winner will be determined using penalty kicks in accordance with FIFA Regulations.

The final match of the previous USSR Cup 1985/86 will take place on May 2 this year in Moscow at the Central Stadium named after V.I. Lenin.

== Participating teams ==
Enter in Round of 32	Enter in First Preliminary Round			
1986 Vysshaya Liga; 16/16 teams	1986 Pervaya Liga; 24/24 teams	1986 Vtoraya Liga; 40/139 teams		
✓ Spartak Moscow; ✓ Dnepr Dnepropetrovsk; ✓ Zalgiris Vilnius; ✓ Torpedo Moscow; ✓ Dinamo Minsk; ✓ Dinamo Kiev; ✓ Shakhter Donetsk; ✓ Ararat Erevan; ✓ Neftchi Baku; ✓ Dinamo Moscow; ✓ Metallist Kharkov; ✓ Kairat Alma-Ata; ✓ Iberia Tbilisi; ✓ Zenit Leningrad; ✓ Chernomorets Odessa (v); ✓ FC Torpedo Kutaisi (v)	✓ CSKA Moscow (^); ✓ Guria Lanchkhuti (^); ✓ Lokomotiv Moscow; ✓ Daugava Riga; ✓ Pamir Dushambe; ✓ SKA Karpaty Lvov; ✓ Kuzbass Kemerovo; ✓ Pakhtakor Tashkent; ✓ Kolos Nikopol; ✓ Metallurg Zaporozhye; ✓ Rostselmash Rostov-na-Donu; ✓ SKA Rostov-na-Donu; ✓ Kotaik Abovian; ✓ Shinnik Yaroslavl; ✓ Dinamo Stavropol; ✓ Rotor Volgograd; ✓ Spartak Ordzhonikidze; ✓ FC Batumi; ✓ Fakel Voronezh; ✓ Kuban Krasnodar (v); ✓ SKA Khabarovsk (v); ✓ Iskra Smolensk (v); ✓ Atlantas Klapeida (v); ✓ Nistru Kishenev (v)	✓ Krasnaya Presnya Moscow; ✓ Arsenal Tula; ✓ Znamia Truda Orekhovo-Zuyevo; ✓ Zorkiy Krasnogorsk	✓ Krylya Sovietov Kuibyshev (^); ✓ Zvezda Perm; ✓ Uralmash Sverdlovsk; ✓ Dinamo Kirov; ✓ Uralets Nizhniy Tagil	✓ Sokol Saratov; ✓ Uralan Elista; ✓ Spartak Nalchik
✓ Spartak Moscow; ✓ Dnepr Dnepropetrovsk; ✓ Zalgiris Vilnius; ✓ Torpedo Moscow; ✓ Dinamo Minsk; ✓ Dinamo Kiev; ✓ Shakhter Donetsk; ✓ Ararat Erevan; ✓ Neftchi Baku; ✓ Dinamo Moscow; ✓ Metallist Kharkov; ✓ Kairat Alma-Ata; ✓ Iberia Tbilisi; ✓ Zenit Leningrad; ✓ Chernomorets Odessa (v); ✓ FC Torpedo Kutaisi (v)	✓ CSKA Moscow (^); ✓ Guria Lanchkhuti (^); ✓ Lokomotiv Moscow; ✓ Daugava Riga; ✓ Pamir Dushambe; ✓ SKA Karpaty Lvov; ✓ Kuzbass Kemerovo; ✓ Pakhtakor Tashkent; ✓ Kolos Nikopol; ✓ Metallurg Zaporozhye; ✓ Rostselmash Rostov-na-Donu; ✓ SKA Rostov-na-Donu; ✓ Kotaik Abovian; ✓ Shinnik Yaroslavl; ✓ Dinamo Stavropol; ✓ Rotor Volgograd; ✓ Spartak Ordzhonikidze; ✓ FC Batumi; ✓ Fakel Voronezh; ✓ Kuban Krasnodar (v); ✓ SKA Khabarovsk (v); ✓ Iskra Smolensk (v); ✓ Atlantas Klapeida (v); ✓ Nistru Kishenev (v)	✓ Geolog Tyumen (^); ✓ Irtysh Omsk; ✓ Zvezda Irkutsk; ✓ Torpedo Rubtsovsk	✓ Metallurg Lipetsk; ✓ Avangard Kursk; ✓ Dnepr Mogilev; ✓ Khimik Grodno; ✓ Dinamo Bryansk	✓ Tavria Simferopol; ✓ SKA Kiev; ✓ Niva Ternopol; ✓ Niva Vinnitsa; ✓ Zakarpatie Uzhgorod; ✓ Sudostroitel Nikolayev; ✓ SKA Odessa
✓ Spartak Moscow; ✓ Dnepr Dnepropetrovsk; ✓ Zalgiris Vilnius; ✓ Torpedo Moscow; ✓ Dinamo Minsk; ✓ Dinamo Kiev; ✓ Shakhter Donetsk; ✓ Ararat Erevan; ✓ Neftchi Baku; ✓ Dinamo Moscow; ✓ Metallist Kharkov; ✓ Kairat Alma-Ata; ✓ Iberia Tbilisi; ✓ Zenit Leningrad; ✓ Chernomorets Odessa (v); ✓ FC Torpedo Kutaisi (v)	✓ CSKA Moscow (^); ✓ Guria Lanchkhuti (^); ✓ Lokomotiv Moscow; ✓ Daugava Riga; ✓ Pamir Dushambe; ✓ SKA Karpaty Lvov; ✓ Kuzbass Kemerovo; ✓ Pakhtakor Tashkent; ✓ Kolos Nikopol; ✓ Metallurg Zaporozhye; ✓ Rostselmash Rostov-na-Donu; ✓ SKA Rostov-na-Donu; ✓ Kotaik Abovian; ✓ Shinnik Yaroslavl; ✓ Dinamo Stavropol; ✓ Rotor Volgograd; ✓ Spartak Ordzhonikidze; ✓ FC Batumi; ✓ Fakel Voronezh; ✓ Kuban Krasnodar (v); ✓ SKA Khabarovsk (v); ✓ Iskra Smolensk (v); ✓ Atlantas Klapeida (v); ✓ Nistru Kishenev (v)	✓ Sokhibkor Khalkabad; ✓ Neftyanik Fergana; ✓ Dinamo Samarkand; ✓ Zarafshan Navoi	✓ Meliorator Chimkent; ✓ Tselinnik Tselinograd; ✓ Shakhter Karaganda; ✓ Traktor Pavlodar	✓ Kyapaz Kirovabad; ✓ Spartak Oktemberyan; ✓ Karabakh Stepanakert; ✓ Kolkhozchi Ashkhabad

Source: []

== Competition schedule ==
=== First preliminary round ===
All games took place on May 2, 1986.

Krylya Sovetov Kuibyshev	1:0	Spartak Ordzhonikidze
Kotaik Abovyan	1:1	Metallurg Lipetsk	(a.e.t.), (4–2 p)
SKA Rostov-na-Donu	3:1	Sudostroitel Nikolayev
Dnepr Mogilev	3:0	Niva Ternopol
Zorkiy Krasnogorsk	2:1	Guria Lachkhuti
Rostselmash Rostov-na-Donu	3:0	Arsenal Tula
Sokol Saratov	4:2	Iskra Smolensk
Zakarpatie Uzhgorod	4:0	Dinamo Bryansk
CSKA Moscow	4:1	Znamya Truda Orekhovo-Zuyevo
Kuzbass Kemerevo	4:1	Avangard Kursk
SKA Kiev	0:1	Dinamo Batumi
SKA Odessa	1:4	Uralan Makhachkala	(a.e.t.)
Pakhtakor Tashkent	0:0	Niva Vinnitsa	???
Lokomotiv Moscow	0:0	Tavria Simferopol	(a.e.t.), (2–3 p)
Spartak Nalchik	1:2	Fakel Voronezh	(a.e.t.)
Khimik Grodno	2:1	Krasnaya Presnya Moscow
Uralets Nizhniy Tagil	2:0	SKA Khabarovsk
Metallurg Zaporozhie	2:0	Tselinnik Tselinograd
Torpedo Rubtsovsk	1:2	Kolos Nikopol
Spartak Oktemberyan	1:0	Kolkhozchi Ashkhabad
Sokhibkor Khakabad	1:3	Daugava Riga
Uralmash Sverdlovsk	0:1	Nistru Kishenev	(a.e.t.)
Shakhter Karaganda	1:0	Atlantas Klaipeda
Meliorator Chimkent	2:3	Traktor Pavlodar
Geolog Tyumen	1:0	Shinnik Yaroslavl
Dinamo Stavropol	4:1	Zarafshan Navoi
Pamir Dushanbe	2:2	Neftyanik Fergana	(a.e.t.), (3–2 p)
Zvezda Perm	0:0	Kyapaz Kirovobad	(a.e.t.), (7–8 p)
Rotor Volgograd	4:1	Irtysh Omsk
Kuban Krasnodar	4:0	Dinamo Kirov
Karabakh Stepanokert	1:1	SKA Karpaty Lvov	(a.e.t.), (2–4 p)
Dinamo Samarkand	1:0	Zvezda Irkutsk	(a.e.t.)

=== Second preliminary round ===
Kotaik Abovyan	1:0	Krylya Sovetov Kuibyshev
SKA Rostov-na-Donu	0:2	Dnepr Mogilev
CSKA Moscow	2:1	Kuzbass Kemerovo
Dinamo Batumi	2:1	Uralan Makhachkala
Tavria Simferopol	2:1	Pakhtakor Tashkent
Uralets Nizhniy Tagil	1:1	Metallurg Zaporozhie	(a.e.t.), (2–4 p)
Kolos Nikopol	2:0	Spartak Oktemberyan
Daugava Riga	5:0	Nistru Kishinev
Traktor Pavlodar	0:1	Shakhter Karaganda
Geolog Tyumen	2:3	Dinamo Stavropol	(a.e.t.)
Kyapaz Kirovobad	4:1	Pamir Dushanbe
Kuban Krasnodar	2:1	Rotor Volgograd
SKA Karpaty Lvov	2:0	Dinamo Samarkand
Rostselmash Rostov-na-Donu	1:0	Zorkiy Krasnogorsk	(a.e.t.)
Fakel Voronezh	2:3	Khimik Grodno
Sokol Saratov	3:2	Zakarpatie Uzhgorod	(a.e.t.)

=== Bracket ===
Round of 32
Dinamo Batumi	1
Metallist Kharkov	2
Spartak Moscow	3
CSKA Moscow	1
Tavria Simferopol	2
Chernomorets Odessa	1
Khimik Grodno	1
Neftchi Baku	0
Dnepr Mogilev	0
Zenit Leningrad (a.e.t.)	2
Dinamo Minsk	4
Kotaik Abovian	1
Torpedo Moscow	3
Sokol Saratov	1
Dinamo Tbilisi	2
Rostselmash Rostov-na-Donu	0
Dinamo Stavropol	1
Dinamo Kiev	2
Kapaz Kirovobad (p)	1 (7)
Torpedo Kutaisi	1 (6)
SKA Karpaty Lvov	1
Ararat Yerevan	0
Zalgiris Vilnius	3
Kuban Krasnodar	0
Shakhter Karaganda	1
Dinamo Moscow	3
Daugava Riga	2
Kairat Alma-Ata	1
Kolos Nikopol	2
Shakhter Donetsk	0
Metallurg Zaporozhye (a.e.t.)	2
Dnepr Dnepropetrovsk	1

Round of 16
Metallist Kharkov (a.e.t.)	1
Spartak Moscow	0
Tavria Simferopol	4
Khimik Grodno	3
Zenit Leningrad	0
Dinamo Minsk	1
Torpedo Moscow	2
Dinamo Tbilisi	1
Dinamo Kiev	2
Kapaz Kirovobad	1
SKA Karpaty Lvov (p)	1 (3)
Zalgiris Vilnius	1 (2)
Dinamo Moscow	3
Daugava Riga	1
Kolos Nikopol	1
Metallurg Zaporozhye	0

Quarterfinals
Metallist Kharkov	0 (2)
Tavria Simferopol (p)	0 (3)
Dinamo Minsk	3
Torpedo Moscow	2
Dinamo Kiev	4
SKA Karpaty Lvov	0
Dinamo Moscow	1
Kolos Nikopol	0

Semifinals
Tavria Simferopol	0
Dinamo Minsk	2
Dinamo Kiev (p)	0 (5)
Dinamo Moscow	0 (4)

Final
Dinamo Minsk	3 (2)
Dinamo Kiev (p)	3 (4)

=== Round of 32 ===
Team 1	Score	Team 2
June 14
Dnepr Mogilev (III)	0–2 (a.e.t.)	(I) Zenit Leningrad
Dinamo Tbilisi (I)	2–0	(II) Rostselmash Rostov-na-Donu
Dinamo Batumi (II)	1–2	(I) Metallist Kharkov
Spartak Moscow (I)	3–1	(II) CSKA Moscow
Tavria Simferopol (III)	2–1	(I) Chernomorets Odessa
Khimik Grodno (III)	1–0	(I) Neftchi Baku
Metallurg Zaporozhye (II)	2–1 (a.e.t.)	(I) Dnepr Dnepropetrovsk
Kolos Nikopol (II)	2–0	(I) Shakhter Donetsk
Shakhter Karaganda (III)	1–3	(I) Dinamo Moscow
Daugava Riga (II)	2–1	(I) Kairat Alma-Ata
Zalgiris Vilnius (I)	3–0	(I) Kuban Krasnodar
SKA Karpaty Lvov (II)	1–0	(I) Ararat Yerevan
Kapaz Kirovobad (III)	1–1 (7–6 p)	(I) Torpedo Kutaisi
June 15
Torpedo Moscow (I)	3–1	(III) Sokol Saratov
June 16
Dinamo Minsk (I)	4–1	(II) Kotayk Abovyan
August 5
Dinamo Stavropol (II)	1–2	(I) Dinamo Kiev

=== Round of 16 ===
Team 1	Score	Team 2
August 4
Zenit Leningrad (I)	0–1	(I) Dinamo Minsk
August 5
Kolos Nikopol (II)	1–0	(II) Metallurg Zaporozhie
Metallist Kharkov (I)	1–0 (a.e.t.)	(I) Spartak Moscow
SKA Karpaty Lvov (II)	1–1 (3–2 p)	(I) Zalgiris Vilnius
Tavria Simferopol (III)	4–3	(III) Khimik Grodno
Torpedo Moscow (I)	2–1	(I) Dinamo Tbilisi
August 6
Dinamo Moscow (I)	3–1	(II) Daugava Riga
September 27
Dinamo Kiev (I)	2–1	(III) Kapaz Kirovobad

=== Quarter-finals ===
Team 1	Score	Team 2
May 14
Dinamo Minsk (I)	3–2	(I) Torpedo Moscow
Dinamo Kiev (I)	4–0	(II) SKA Karpaty Lvov
Dinamo Moscow (I)	1–0	(II) Kolos Nikopol
Metallist Kharkov (I)	0–0 (2–3 p)	(III) Tavria Simferopol

=== Semi-finals ===
Team 1	Score	Team 2
May 22
Dinamo Kiev (I)	0–0 (5–4 p)	(I) Dinamo Moscow
Tavria Simferopol (III)	0–2	(I) Dinamo Minsk

=== Final ===
14 June 1987
?:? LST

Dynamo Kyiv	3 – 3	Dinamo Minsk
Rats 45'; Kuznetsov 63'; Zavarov 90'	Report	Kondratiev 20'; Zygmantovich 45' (pen.); Aleinikov 60'
Penalties
Demyanenko (penalty scored); Mykhailychenko (penalty scored); Baltacha (penalty scored); Yevtushenko (penalty scored)	4 – 2	(penalty scored) Myatlitski; (penalty missed) Borovsky; (penalty missed) Aleinikov; (penalty scored) Kurnenin

Lenin's Central Stadium, Moscow
Attendance: 75,000
Referee: Valeri Butenko (Moscow)
