= Vasili Zhupikov =

Russian footballer

Personal information
- Full name: Vasili Mikhailovich Zhupikov
- Date of birth: 16 January 1954
- Place of birth: Astrakhan, Russian SFSR
- Date of death: 7 June 2015 (aged 61)
- Place of death: Podolsk, Russia
- Height: 1.84 m (6 ft 0 in)
- Position: Defender

Youth career
- Lokomotiv Astrakhan
- Smena Astrakhan

Senior career*
| Years | Team | Apps | (Gls) |
| 1972–1974 | Volgar Astrakhan | | |
| 1975–1976 | Krylia Sovetov Kuibyshev | 63 | (1) |
| 1977–1985 | FC Torpedo Moscow | 256 | (3) |
| 1986 | FC Dynamo Moscow | 6 | (0) |
| 1987–1988 | SK Tallinna Sport | 66 | (10) |
| 1989 | FC Lada Togliatti | 36 | (3) |
| 1989–1993 | FC Krylia Sovetov Samara | 110 | (2) |
| 1993 | FC Neftekhimik Nizhnekamsk | 21 | (0) |

International career
| 1977–1979 | USSR | 15 | (0) |

Managerial career
- 1993–1997: FC Neftekhimik Nizhnekamsk (assistant)
- 1997–2001: FC Lokomotiv Nizhny Novgorod (assistant)
- 2001–2002: FC Torpedo-ZIL (youth teams)
- 2002–2005: FC Volgar-Gazprom Astrakhan (assistant)
- 2006–2015: FC Moscow (youth teams)
- * Club domestic league appearances and goals

Vasili Mikhailovich Zhupikov (Russian: Василий Михайлович Жупиков; 16 January 1954 – 7 June 2015) was a Soviet football player and a Russian coach.

== Honours ==
- Soviet Top League bronze: 1977.
- Soviet Cup winner: 1986.
- Top 33 players year-end list: 1977, 1978, 1983.

== International career ==
Zhupikov made his debut for USSR on 7 September 1977 in a friendly against Poland. He played in the UEFA Euro 1980 qualifiers (USSR did not qualify for the final tournament).
