= Nikolay Bogachyov =

Russian entrepreneur and politician (born 1953)

- Николай Владимирович Богачёв
- Born: August 17, 1953 (age 71); Moscow, Russia
- Occupation(s): Politician, entrepreneur

Nikolay Bogachyov (Russian: Николай Богачёв; born August 17, 1953) is a Russian entrepreneur and politician. He is the CEO of natural gas company TambeyNefteGaz, in 2003 became leader of the Conservative Party of Russia, and part-time professor at the High School of Economics of Russia.

== Early life ==
Nikolay Bogachyov was born in Moscow, Russia on August 17, 1953. At the age of six he went with his father, reporter Vladimir Bogachyov, to the United States, where he stayed for five years. In his young adulthood, he fulfilled a variety of roles for the Soviet Foreign Ministry in the Middle East and North Africa. Rumors associate him with the First Chief Directorate.

== Business career ==
After the collapse of the Soviet Union, Bogachyov grew wealthy participating in the privatization of Russia's natural resources.

In 1992, he earned his first money by investing in oil with Xavier Corp. He earned $2,000,000 from that deal. Later, he bought several oil fields in West Siberia and consolidated them into Khanty Mansiysk Oil Corporation (KMOS).

In 2003, he and his partners sold KMOS to Marathon Oil for roughly $300,000,000. In 1995, he bought a port in Novorossisk and has become a CEO of Novorlesexport, a wood transporting company. He recently sold his shares in that firm to Kerria Oil for 800 million dollars. Bogachyov then purchased natural gas fields all over Russia.

The growth of Tambeyneftegaz brought Bogochyov into conflict with Gazprom bank officials over control of certain gas fields. The conflict has been temporarily settled by his allocation of his interest in those fields to Gazprom.

In January 2007, Nikolay Bogachev was forced to sell his company to Gazprom for about a 10th of its value. Same year Bogachev founded "Young Energy Prize" and is now devoting all of his time to his new creation. Through this vehicle he owns a considerable stake in Magellan Petroleum Corporation, a stranded gas / energy resource developer with interests in Australia, the United Kingdom, and North America.

In Australia, his focus is the development of substantial discovered natural gas reserves into Asian market growth.

== Bibliography ==
- (2003). "Russian Conservative Party chief sets out stall for coming poll." BBC Worldwide Monitoring. September 22.
- (2006). "Summary of Russian Press." BBC Worldwide Monitoring. November 26.
