= Sergei Kozhanov =

Russian footballer

Personal information
- Full name: Sergei Leonidovich Kozhanov
- Date of birth: 21 July 1964 (age 62)
- Place of birth: Makhachkala, Russia
- Height: 1.76 m (5 ft 9 1/2 in)
- Positions: Defender; midfielder; forward

Youth career
- FC Dynamo Makhachkala

Senior career*
Years	Team	Apps	(Gls)
1980–1983	FC Dynamo Makhachkala	32	(4)
1983–1987	FC Dynamo Moscow	35	(2)
1988	FC Chornomorets Odesa	6	(0)
1989–1991	FC Zimbru Chişinău	106	(2)
1992	FC Spartak Vladikavkaz	20	(0)
1992–1994	SK Odesa	25	(0)
1994	FC Tekhinvest-M Moskovsky	27	(0)
- * Club domestic league appearances and goals

Sergei Leonidovich Kozhanov (Russian: Серге́й Леонидович Кожанов; born 21 July 1964) is a former Russian professional footballer.

== Club career ==
He made his professional debut in the Soviet Second League in 1980 for FC Dynamo Makhachkala.

== Honours ==
- Soviet Top League runner-up: 1986.
- Soviet Cup winner: 1984.
- Russian Premier League runner-up: 1992.
