= Gennadi Bogachyov (footballer) =

Russian footballer

Personal information
- Full name: Gennadi Aleksandrovich Bogachyov
- Date of birth: 10 February 1967 (age 59)
- Place of birth: Moscow, Russian SFSR
- Height: 1.82 m (5 ft 11 1/2 in)
- Positions: Defender; midfielder

Youth career
- FC Spartak Moscow

Senior career*
Years	Team	Apps	(Gls)
1983–1986	FC Spartak Moscow	4	(0)
1987	FC Geolog Tyumen	16	(0)
1988–1989	FC SKA Rostov-on-Don	41	(3)
1989	FC Shinnik Yaroslavl	8	(2)
1990	FC Geolog Tyumen	32	(4)
1991	FC Metalurh Zaporizhya	0	(0)
1991	FC Geolog Tyumen	1	(0)
1991	FC Asmaral Kislovodsk	6	(1)
1991	FC Presnya Moscow	2	(0)
1991	FC Rostselmash Rostov-on-Don	15	(1)
1992–1993	FC Dynamo Stavropol	23	(0)
1993–1994	FC Tekhinvest-M Moskovsky	40	(5)
1994	FC Spartak Shchyolkovo	7	(0)
1995	FC Zvezda Perm	27	(3)
1996–1999	FC Dynamo Perm	106	(12)
- * Club domestic league appearances and goals

Gennadi Aleksandrovich Bogachyov (Russian: Геннадий Александрович Богачёв; born 10 February 1967) is a former Russian professional footballer.

== Club career ==
He made his professional debut in the Soviet Top League in 1986 for FC Spartak Moscow. He played 1 game in the UEFA Cup 1986–87 for FC Spartak Moscow.

== Honours ==
- Soviet Top League bronze: 1986.
