= Football at the 1979 Spartakiad of the Peoples of the USSR =

1979 Spartakiad of Peoples of the USSR football tournament
Tournament details
- Host country: Russian SFSR, Ukrainian SSR, Belarusian SSR
- Dates: 20 July – 5 August
- Teams: 16
- Venue: 4 (in 3 host cities)

Final positions
- Champions: Moscow (2nd title)
- Runners-up: (Georgian Soviet Socialist Republic) Georgian SSR
- Third place: (Ukrainian Soviet Socialist Republic) Ukrainian SSR
- Fourth place: (Russian Soviet Federative Socialist Republic) Russian SFSR

Tournament statistics
- Matches played: 52
- Goals scored: 161 (3.1 per match)

The football tournament at the 1979 Summer Spartakiad of the Peoples of the USSR was a preparatory competition for the Soviet Union Olympic football team for the upcoming 1980 Summer Olympics. The competition took place on July 20 through August 5, 1979 as part of the Spartakiad of Peoples of the USSR.

Out of all the union republics, the Estonian SSR was not participating, while Russia was represented with 3 teams: Moscow City, Leningrad City and Russian Federation.

The competition took place during the mid-season break of the 1979 Soviet Union football championship. Less than a week later after the tournament, an aircraft with Pakhtakor Tashkent players who were traveling to the away game against Dinamo Minsk crashed in the sky over Dniprodzerzhynsk.

== Competition ==
=== Qualification groups ===
All times local (UTC+3)

Group 1 (Moscow)

- CSKA Stadium, Lokomotiv Stadium

Pos	Team	Pld	W	D	L	GF	GA	GD	Pts	Qualification	MSC	KZX	MLD	TRK
1	(Moscow) Moskva	3	3	0	0	10	2	+8	6	Advance to semifinal groups	—	3–0	5–1	2–1
2	(Kazakh Soviet Socialist Republic) Kazakhstan	3	2	0	1	3	4	−1	4	Advance to semifinal groups		—	2–1	1–0
3	(Moldavian Soviet Socialist Republic) Moldavia	3	1	0	2	4	8	−4	2	Advance to consolation tournament			—	2–1
4	(Turkmen Soviet Socialist Republic) Turkmenistan	3	0	0	3	2	5	−3	0	Advance to consolation tournament				—

Group 2 (Moscow)

- Torpedo Stadium

Pos	Team	Pld	W	D	L	GF	GA	GD	Pts	Qualification	GRU	LIT	AZE	KIR
1	(Georgian Soviet Socialist Republic) Gruzia	3	2	1	0	8	0	+8	5	Advance to semifinal groups	—	5–0	0–0	3–0
2	(Lithuanian Soviet Socialist Republic) Litva	3	1	1	1	1	5	−4	3	Advance to semifinal groups		—	1–0	0–0
3	(Azerbaijan Soviet Socialist Republic) Azerbaijan	3	1	1	1	1	1	0	3	Advance to consolation tournament			—	1–0
4	(Kirghiz Soviet Socialist Republic) Kirghizia	3	0	1	2	0	4	−4	1	Advance to consolation tournament				—

Group 3 (Kiev)

- Dynamo Stadium

Pos	Team	Pld	W	D	L	GF	GA	GD	Pts	Qualification	UKR	RUS	UZB	TJK
1	(Ukrainian Soviet Socialist Republic) Ukraina	3	3	0	0	10	3	+7	6	Advance to semifinal groups	—	5–1	2–1	3–1
2	(Russian Soviet Federative Socialist Republic) RSFSR	3	2	0	1	4	6	−2	4	Advance to semifinal groups		—	2–1	1–0
3	(Uzbek Soviet Socialist Republic) Uzbekistan	3	1	0	2	4	4	0	2	Advance to consolation tournament			—	2–0
4	(Tajik Soviet Socialist Republic) Tajikistan	3	0	0	3	1	6	−5	0	Advance to consolation tournament				—

Group 4 (Minsk)

- Traktor Stadium

Pos	Team	Pld	W	D	L	GF	GA	GD	Pts	Qualification	LEN	BEL	LAT	ARM
1	(Saint Petersburg) Leningrad	3	3	0	0	13	4	+9	6	Advance to semifinal groups	—	3–2	7–2	3–0
2	(Byelorussian Soviet Socialist Republic) Belarusia	3	2	0	1	7	4	+3	4	Advance to semifinal groups		—	2–1	3–0
3	(Latvian Soviet Socialist Republic) Latvia	3	1	0	2	7	10	−3	2	Advance to consolation tournament			—	4–1
4	(Armenian Soviet Socialist Republic) Armenia	3	0	0	3	1	10	−9	0	Advance to consolation tournament				—

=== Consolation tournament ===
For 9-12 places (Kiev)

Pos	Team	Pld	W	D	L	GF	GA	GD	Pts	UZB	AZE	MLD	LAT
9	(Uzbek Soviet Socialist Republic) Uzbekistan	3	2	1	0	7	4	+3	5	—	3–1	2–2	2–1
10	(Azerbaijan Soviet Socialist Republic) Azerbaijan	3	2	0	1	6	6	0	4		—	2–1	3–2
11	(Moldavian Soviet Socialist Republic) Moldavia	3	1	1	1	4	4	0	3			—	1–0
12	(Latvian Soviet Socialist Republic) Latvia	3	0	0	3	3	6	−3	0				—

For 13-16 places (Minsk)

Pos	Team	Pld	W	D	L	GF	GA	GD	Pts	TJK	ARM	KRG	TUR
13	(Tajik Soviet Socialist Republic) Tajikistan	3	2	1	0	12	3	+9	5	—	2–2	2–1	8–0
14	(Armenian Soviet Socialist Republic) Armenia	3	2	1	0	6	3	+3	5		—	2–1	2–0
15	(Kirghiz Soviet Socialist Republic) Kirghizia	3	0	1	2	4	6	−2	1			—	2–2
16	(Turkmen Soviet Socialist Republic) Turkmenistan	3	0	1	2	2	12	−10	1				—

=== Semifinals groups ===
Group A

Pos	Team	Pld	W	D	L	GF	GA	GD	Pts	Qualification	MOS	UKR	LIT	BEL
1	(Moscow) Moskva	3	2	1	0	4	0	+4	5	Final game	—	2–0	2–0	0–0
2	(Ukrainian Soviet Socialist Republic) Ukraina	3	1	1	1	2	2	0	3	3rd place game		—	2–0	0–0
3	(Lithuanian Soviet Socialist Republic) Litva	3	1	0	2	2	4	−2	2	5th place game			—	2–0
4	(Byelorussian Soviet Socialist Republic) Beloroussia	3	0	2	1	0	2	−2	2	7th place game				—

Group B

Pos	Team	Pld	W	D	L	GF	GA	GD	Pts	Qualification	GRU	RSF	LEN	KAZ
1	(Georgian Soviet Socialist Republic) Grouzia	3	2	1	0	8	5	+3	5	Final game	—	1–1	4–2	3–2
2	(Russian Soviet Federative Socialist Republic) RSFSR	3	2	1	0	7	1	+6	5	3rd place game		—	2–0	4–0
3	(Saint Petersburg) Leningrad	3	1	0	2	5	7	−2	2	5th place game			—	3–1
4	(Kazakh Soviet Socialist Republic) Kazakhstan	3	0	0	3	3	10	−7	0	7th place game				—

=== Playoffs games ===
7th place game.

4 August 1979	Beloroussia	0–1	Kazakhstan	Moscow
			Nekhtiy 40'	Stadium: Stadion CSKA; Attendance: 1,000; Referee: Henrik Nalbandyan (Yerevan)

5th place game.

4 August 1979	Leningrad	2–1	Litva	Moscow
	Kazachyonok 37'; Rasputin 68'		Kasparavičius 72'	Stadium: Stadion Torpedo; Attendance: 1,500; Referee: Yuriy Zvyagintsev (Moscow)

3rd place game.

4 August 1979	RSFSR	1–2 (a.e.t.)	Ukraina	Moscow
	Panfilov 5'		Yurchyshyn 50', 118'	Stadium: Stadion Lokomotiv; Attendance: 15,000; Referee: Valeri Butenko (Moscow)

=== Final Game ===
5 August 1979

Moskva	2 – 1	Grouzia
Maksimenkov 40', 55'	Report	G.Machaidze 83'

Tsentralnyi stadion imeni Lenina, Moscow
Attendance: 100,000
Referee: Myroslav Stupar (Ivano-Frankivsk), (Ukraine)

Moscow:
GK	1	Rinat Dasayev
DF	2	Viktor Samokhin
DF	4	Sergei Nikulin
DF	7	Aleksandr Bubnov
MF	6	Aleksandr Makhovikov (c)
DF	5	Vagiz Khidiyatullin	Booked
MF	10	Aleksandr Maksimenkov	40', 55'
MF	11	Sergey Shavlo
MF	15	Yuri Gavrilov	(substituted off) 78'
MF	12	Yevgeni Sidorov	(substituted off) 67'
FW	18	Fyodor Cherenkov
Substitutes:
FW	19	Nikolai Vasilyev	(substituted in) 78'
FW	17	Valery Petrakov	(substituted in) 67'
Manager:
Konstantin Beskov

Georgian SSR:
GK	17	Otar Gabelia
MF	2	Tengiz Sulakvelidze
DF	3	Aleksandre Chivadze
DF	4	Shota Khinchagashvili
DF	12	Davit Mujiri
DF	5	Gocha Machaidze	83'
MF	6	Vitaly Daraselia
MF	7	Manuchar Machaidze (c)
MF	8	Vakhtang Koridze	(substituted off) 65'
FW	9	Vladimir Gutsaev	Booked
FW	19	Revaz Chelebadze		(substituted off) 46'
Substitutes:
MF	10	Nugzar Kakilashvili	(substituted in) 65'
FW	11	Ramaz Shengelia	(substituted in) 46'
Manager:
Nodar Akhalkatsi

MATCH OFFICIALS

- Assistant referees:

MATCH RULES

- 90 minutes.
- 30 minutes of extra-time if necessary.
- Penalty shoot-out if scores still level.

== Statistics ==
=== Goalscorers ===
There have been 160 goals scored in 52 matches, for an average of 3.08 goals per match (as of 5 August 1979). Players highlighted in bold are still active in the competition.

6 goals

- (Leningrad Oblast) Vladimir Kazachyonok

5 goals

- (Russian Soviet Federative Socialist Republic) Sergey Andreyev
- (Moscow) Yevgeni Sidorov

4 goals

- (Ukrainian Soviet Socialist Republic) Oleh Blokhin
- (Georgian Soviet Socialist Republic) Revaz Chelebadze
- (Georgian Soviet Socialist Republic) Vitaly Daraselia
- (Leningrad Oblast) Aleksandr Rasputin
- (Leningrad Oblast) Anatoli Zinchenko

3 goals

- (Tajik Soviet Socialist Republic) Nuritdin Amriyev
- (Uzbek Soviet Socialist Republic) Viktor Churkin
- (Ukrainian Soviet Socialist Republic) Viktor Kolotov
- (Russian Soviet Federative Socialist Republic) Aleksandr Ploshnik
- (Latvian Soviet Socialist Republic) Yuriy Romanenkov
- (Armenian Soviet Socialist Republic) Ashot Saakyan
- (Ukrainian Soviet Socialist Republic) Stepan Yurchyshyn

2 goals

- (Azerbaijan Soviet Socialist Republic) Oleg Axanov
- (Byelorussian Soviet Socialist Republic) Anatoly Baidachny
- (Uzbek Soviet Socialist Republic) Konstantin Bakanov
- (Ukrainian Soviet Socialist Republic) Leonid Buryak
- (Moscow) Fyodor Cherenkov
- (Tajik Soviet Socialist Republic) Gennadiy Cherevchenko
- (Uzbek Soviet Socialist Republic) Vladimir Fyodorov
- (Moscow) Yuri Gavrilov
- (Kirghiz Soviet Socialist Republic) Aleksandr Kantsurov
- (Leningrad Oblast) Vladimir Klementyev
- (Latvian Soviet Socialist Republic) Anatoliy Kondratenko
- (Georgian Soviet Socialist Republic) Vakhtang Koridze
- (Moscow) Aleksandr Maksimenkov
- (Armenian Soviet Socialist Republic) Babken Melikyan
- (Leningrad Oblast) Vyacheslav Melnikov
- (Moldavian Soviet Socialist Republic) Mykola Mykhailov
- (Moscow) Valery Petrakov
- (Turkmen Soviet Socialist Republic) Pawel Petrow
- (Byelorussian Soviet Socialist Republic) Aleksandr Prokopenko
- (Tajik Soviet Socialist Republic) Viktor Raimdzhanov
- (Latvian Soviet Socialist Republic) Valeriy Semyonov
- (Latvian Soviet Socialist Republic) Aleksandrs Starkovs
- (Tajik Soviet Socialist Republic) Valeriy Tursunov

1 goal

- (Azerbaijan Soviet Socialist Republic) Asif Aliyev
- (Uzbek Soviet Socialist Republic) Mikhail An
- (Tajik Soviet Socialist Republic) Shukhrat Azamov
- (Armenian Soviet Socialist Republic) Grigor Badalyan
- (Kazakh Soviet Socialist Republic) Seilda Baishakov
- (Kazakh Soviet Socialist Republic) Mikhail Blank
- (Kirghiz Soviet Socialist Republic) Aleksandr Bondarenko
- (Russian Soviet Federative Socialist Republic) Viktor Bondarenko
- (Moldavian Soviet Socialist Republic) Ion Caras
- (Moldavian Soviet Socialist Republic) Pavel Cebanu
- (Tajik Soviet Socialist Republic) Oleksiy Cherednyk
- (Moscow) Yuri Chesnokov
- (Georgian Soviet Socialist Republic) Georgi Chilaya
- (Georgian Soviet Socialist Republic) Aleksandre Chivadze
- (Russian Soviet Federative Socialist Republic) Yuriy Churkin
- (Latvian Soviet Socialist Republic) Dainis Deglis
- (Lithuanian Soviet Socialist Republic) Vytautas Dirmeikis
- (Uzbek Soviet Socialist Republic) Shuhrat Eshbo’taеv
- (Tajik Soviet Socialist Republic) Edgar Gess
- (Georgian Soviet Socialist Republic) Vladimir Gutsaev
- (Azerbaijan Soviet Socialist Republic) Rauf Ismailov
- (Georgian Soviet Socialist Republic) Nugzar Kakilashvili
- (Lithuanian Soviet Socialist Republic) Valdas Kasparavičius
- (Ukrainian Soviet Socialist Republic) Aleksandr Khapsalis
- (Moldavian Soviet Socialist Republic) Volodymyr Khokhlov
- (Kazakh Soviet Socialist Republic) Stanislav Kochubynskyi
- (Turkmen Soviet Socialist Republic) Wladimir Konstantinow
- (Georgian Soviet Socialist Republic) Vakhtang Kopaleishvili
- (Byelorussian Soviet Socialist Republic) Syarhei Korbut
- (Lithuanian Soviet Socialist Republic) Valerij Kroman
- (Azerbaijan Soviet Socialist Republic) Samed Kurbanov
- (Lithuanian Soviet Socialist Republic) Jevgenij Kurguznikov
- (Byelorussian Soviet Socialist Republic) Yuri Kurnenin
- (Kazakh Soviet Socialist Republic) Nikolai Leksin
- (Georgian Soviet Socialist Republic) Gocha Machaidze
- (Moldavian Soviet Socialist Republic) Alexandru Mațiura
- (Kazakh Soviet Socialist Republic) Volodymyr Nekhtiy
- (Kazakh Soviet Socialist Republic) Vladimir Nikitenko
- (Kirghiz Soviet Socialist Republic) Vladimir Oreshin
- (Russian Soviet Federative Socialist Republic) Valerian Panfilov
- (Russian Soviet Federative Socialist Republic) Vitaly Razdayev
- (Tajik Soviet Socialist Republic) Anatoliy Rodionov
- (Ukrainian Soviet Socialist Republic) Volodymyr Rohovsky
- (Moldavian Soviet Socialist Republic) Vladimir Safronenko
- (Moscow) Aleksandr Sorokin
- (Uzbek Soviet Socialist Republic) Turaberdy Shaymardanov
- (Azerbaijan Soviet Socialist Republic) Səmədağa Şıxlarov
- (Kazakh Soviet Socialist Republic) Anton Shokh
- (Georgian Soviet Socialist Republic) Georgi Tavadze
- (Moldavian Soviet Socialist Republic) Georgiy Teglyatsov
- (Leningrad Oblast) Yuriy Timofeyev
- (Azerbaijan Soviet Socialist Republic) Rashid Uzbekov
- (Byelorussian Soviet Socialist Republic) Pyotr Vasilevsky
- (Moscow) Nikolai Vasilyev
- (Armenian Soviet Socialist Republic) Sergei Zakaryan
- (Leningrad Oblast) Yuri Zheludkov
- (Turkmen Soviet Socialist Republic) Aleksei Zhigaçow

1 own goal

- (Latvian Soviet Socialist Republic) Dainis Deglis (for Uzbekistan)

== Squads composition ==
=== Moldavian SSR ===
Head coach: Vyacheslav Kirichenko (Nistru Kishinev), assistant: Vladimir Gasperskiy (Avtomobilist Tiraspol)

Whole squad was based on the senior team of FC Nistru Kishinev.

No.	Pos.	Player	Date of birth (age)	Caps	Goals	Club
1	GK	Nicolae Cebotari	21 May 1958 (aged 21)			Nistru Kishinev
2	DF	Grigori Yanets	18 August 1948 (aged 30)			Nistru Kishinev
3	DF	Ion Caras	11 September 1950 (aged 28)			Nistru Kishinev
4	MF	Pavel Cebanu	28 March 1955 (aged 24)			Nistru Kishinev
5	MF	Ivan Daniliants	20 February 1953 (aged 26)			Nistru Kishinev
6	DF	Georgiy Teglyatsov	27 February 1954 (aged 25)			Nistru Kishinev
7	MF	Yuriy Belenkiy	1955 (aged ~24)			Nistru Kishinev
8	MF	Volodymyr Khokhlov	16 April 1953 (aged 26)			Nistru Kishinev
9	FW	Yuriy Khlopotnov	12 October 1952 (aged 26)			Nistru Kishinev
10	FW	Ihor Semenka	18 January 1957 (aged 22)			Nistru Kishinev
11	MF	Vladimir Safronenko	18 March 1957 (aged 22)			Nistru Kishinev
12	MF	Serghei Dubrovin	4 January 1952 (aged 27)			Nistru Kishinev
13	FW	Mykola Mykhailov	5 August 1948 (aged 30)			Nistru Kishinev
14	MF	Alexandru Mațiura	24 October 1954 (aged 24)			Nistru Kishinev
15	DF	Anatoli Yanets	21 December 1959 (aged 19)			Nistru Kishinev
16	GK	Viktor Lakhtin	11 January 1957 (aged 22)			Nistru Kishinev
17	MF	Veaceslav Semionov	16 March 1956 (aged 23)			Nistru Kishinev
18	MF	Yuriy Gamarts	9 June 1961 (aged 18)			Nistru Kishinev
19	DF	Valentin Kovach	25 July 1961 (aged 17)			Nistru Kishinev
20	MF	Alexandru Spiridon	20 July 1960 (aged 19)			Nistru Kishinev

=== Kazakh SSR ===
Head coach: Igor Volchok (Kairat Alma-Ata), assistant: Leonid Ostroushko (Kairat Alma-Ata)

Whole squad was based on the senior team of FC Kairat Alma-Ata.

No.	Pos.	Player	Date of birth (age)	Caps	Goals	Club
1	GK	Kuralbek Ordabayev	6 August 1949 (aged 29)			Kairat Alma-Ata
2	DF	Stanislav Kochubynskyi	23 February 1954 (aged 25)			Kairat Alma-Ata
3	DF	Vait Talgayev	11 May 1953 (aged 26)			Kairat Alma-Ata
4	DF	Seilda Baishakov	28 August 1950 (aged 28)			Kairat Alma-Ata
5	DF	Vyacheslav Davydov	7 April 1953 (aged 26)			Kairat Alma-Ata
6	MF	Vladimir Nikitenko	8 January 1957 (aged 22)			Kairat Alma-Ata
7	MF	Sergei Stukashov	12 November 1959 (aged 19)			Kairat Alma-Ata
8	MF	Valeri Gladilin	19 October 1951 (aged 27)			Kairat Alma-Ata
9	FW	Valeriy Fomin	8 March 1958 (aged 21)			Kairat Alma-Ata
10	FW	Nikolai Leksin	21 May 1953 (aged 26)			Kairat Alma-Ata
11	FW	Volodymyr Nekhtiy	20 February 1951 (aged 28)			Kairat Alma-Ata
12	DF	Yusup Shadiev	23 May 1954 (aged 25)			Kairat Alma-Ata
13	DF	Aleksandr Gostenin	29 April 1955 (aged 24)			Kairat Alma-Ata
14	MF	Andrei Pinchukov	2 October 1957 (aged 21)			Kairat Alma-Ata
15	DF	Gennadiy Shtromberger	1 January 1956 (aged 23)			Kairat Alma-Ata
16	GK	Aleksandr Ubykin	30 March 1953 (aged 26)			Kairat Alma-Ata
17	MF	Anton Shokh	7 January 1960 (aged 19)			Kairat Alma-Ata
18	MF	Sergei Sorokin	21 January 1959 (aged 20)			Kairat Alma-Ata
19	FW	Mikhail Blank	9 September 1959 (aged 19)			Kairat Alma-Ata
20	DF	Boris Dzhumanov	27 August 1959 (aged 19)			Kairat Alma-Ata

=== Turkmen SSR ===
Head coach: Valery Nepomnyashchy (Kolkhozchi Ashkhabad), assistant: Viktor Savenkov

Whole squad was based on the senior team of FC Kolkhozchi Ashkhabad.

No.	Pos.	Player	Date of birth (age)	Caps	Goals	Club
1	GK	Wiktor Kuroçkin	29 September 1954 (aged 24)			Kolkhozchi Ashkhabad
2	DF	Tahir Saparow	1960 (aged 19)			Kolkhozchi Ashkhabad
3	DF	Baýram Durdyýew	17 March 1960 (aged 19)			Kolkhozchi Ashkhabad
4	DF	Sergei Anashkin	12 April 1961 (aged 18)			Kolkhozchi Ashkhabad
5	DF	Wyaçeslaw Wowk	10 October 1952 (aged 26)			Kolkhozchi Ashkhabad
6	MF	Waleriý Kirillow	15 April 1957 (aged 22)			Kolkhozchi Ashkhabad
7	MF	Sergeý Kazankow	26 June 1957 (aged 22)			Kolkhozchi Ashkhabad
8	MF	Alikper Gurbani	1951 (aged 28)			Kolkhozchi Ashkhabad
9	MF	Wladimir Konstantinow	24 August 1953 (aged 25)			Kolkhozchi Ashkhabad
10	MF	Pawel Petrow	29 June 1956 (aged 23)			Kolkhozchi Ashkhabad
11	FW	Wladimir Paşkow	1960 (aged 19)			Kolkhozchi Ashkhabad
12	FW	Aleksei Zhigaçow	21 May 1954 (aged 25)			Kolkhozchi Ashkhabad
13	DF	Berdy Niýazow	1955 (aged 24)			Kolkhozchi Ashkhabad
14	MF	Oleg Owçinnikow	5 March 1959 (aged 20)			Kolkhozchi Ashkhabad
15	FW	Iskander Kurbanow	1957 (aged 22)			Kolkhozchi Ashkhabad
16	GK	Anatoliý Sobkin	1960 (aged 19)			Kolkhozchi Ashkhabad
17	MF	Boris Puzikow	3 September 1960 (aged 18)			Kolkhozchi Ashkhabad
18	DF	Konstantin Korotkow				Kolkhozchi Ashkhabad
19	FW	Waleriý Gorinow				Kolkhozchi Ashkhabad

=== Moscow ===
Head coach: Konstantin Beskov (Spartak Moscow), assistant: Nikolai Starostin (Spartak Moscow)

No.	Pos.	Player	Date of birth (age)	Caps	Goals	Club
1	GK	Rinat Dasayev	13 June 1957 (aged 22)			Spartak Moscow
2	DF	Viktor Samokhin	1 January 1956 (aged 23)			Spartak Moscow
3	DF	Aleksandr Novikov	14 June 1955 (aged 24)			Dynamo Moscow
4	DF	Sergei Nikulin	1 January 1951 (aged 28)			Dynamo Moscow
5	DF	Vagiz Khidiyatullin	3 March 1959 (aged 20)			Spartak Moscow
6	MF	Aleksandr Makhovikov	12 April 1951 (aged 28)			Dynamo Moscow
7	DF	Aleksandr Bubnov	10 October 1955 (aged 23)			Dynamo Moscow
8	MF	Aleksandr Sorokin	14 December 1955 (aged 23)			Spartak Moscow
9	MF	Nikolai Latysh	2 August 1955 (aged 23)			Dynamo Moscow
10	MF	Aleksandr Maksimenkov	17 August 1952 (aged 26)			Dynamo Moscow
11	MF	Sergey Shavlo	4 September 1956 (aged 22)			Spartak Moscow
12	MF	Yevgeni Sidorov	3 May 1956 (aged 23)			Spartak Moscow
13	MF	Andrei Yakubik	24 August 1950 (aged 28)			Dynamo Moscow
14	FW	Yuri Chesnokov	25 January 1952 (aged 27)			CSKA Moscow
15	MF	Yuri Gavrilov	3 May 1953 (aged 26)			Spartak Moscow
16	GK	Vladimir Pilguy	26 January 1948 (aged 31)			Dynamo Moscow
17	FW	Valery Petrakov	16 May 1958 (aged 21)			Lokomotiv Moscow
18	MF	Fyodor Cherenkov	25 July 1959 (aged 19)			Spartak Moscow
19	FW	Nikolai Vasilyev	10 April 1957 (aged 22)			Torpedo Moscow
20	MF	Aleksei Petrushin	29 January 1952 (aged 27)			Dynamo Moscow

=== Kyrgyz SSR ===
Head coach: Rivgat Bibayev (Alga Frunze), assistant: Anatoliy Kolmykov

Whole squad was based on the senior team of FC Alga Frunze.

No.	Pos.	Player	Date of birth (age)	Caps	Goals	Club
1	GK	Rais Batrayev	4 July 1953 (aged 26)			Alga Frunze
2	DF	Georgiy Sidorenkov	13 August 1953 (aged 25)			Alga Frunze
3	DF	Yevgeniy Novikov	16 February 1952 (aged 27)			Alga Frunze
4	DF	Vladislav Khokhlachov	1956 (aged 23)			Alga Frunze
5	DF	Kamoldzhan Toichiyev	6 July 1958 (aged 21)			Alga Frunze
6	MF	Meklis Koshaliyev	30 November 1951 (aged 27)			Alga Frunze
7	MF	Vladimir Oreshin	21 February 1951 (aged 28)			Alga Frunze
8	MF	Avkhat Abdulin	30 September 1957 (aged 21)			Alga Frunze
9	FW	Aleksandr Bondarenko	11 September 1954 (aged 24)			Alga Frunze
10	FW	Aleksandr Kantsurov	18 December 1949 (aged 29)			Alga Frunze
11	FW	Almaz Chokmorov	18 January 1954 (aged 25)			Alga Frunze
12	FW	Semen Osynovskyi	25 September 1960 (aged 18)			Alga Frunze
13	MF	Nikolai Bulgakov	15 January 1960 (aged 19)			Alga Frunze
14	MF	Igor Lyalin	6 December 1960 (aged 18)			Alga Frunze
15	FW	Serhiy Shevchenko	15 May 1960 (aged 19)			Alga Frunze
16	FW	Damir Kadyrov	1960 (aged 19)			Alga Frunze
17	GK	Marat Shagabutdinov	1955 (aged 24)			Alga Frunze
18	DF	Aleksandr Priteyev	24 September 1959 (aged 19)			Alga Frunze
19	MF	Yasyn Musayev	1 November 1960 (aged 18)			Alga Frunze
20	DF	Gennadiy Fokin	26 July 1959 (aged 19)			Alga Frunze

=== Azerbaijan SSR ===
Head coach: Ahmad Alasgarov (Neftchi Baku), assistant: Vladimir Shuvalov

Whole squad was based on the senior team of FC Neftchi Baku.

No.	Pos.	Player	Date of birth (age)	Caps	Goals	Club
1	GK	Sergey Kramarenko	20 May 1946 (aged 33)			Neftchi Baku
2	DF	Arif Orudjev	18 December 1951 (aged 27)			Neftchi Baku
3	DF	Asim Xudiyev	22 February 1957 (aged 22)			Neftchi Baku
4	DF	Rashid Uzbekov	31 January 1953 (aged 26)			Neftchi Baku
5	DF	Asaf Namazov	26 January 1952 (aged 27)			Neftchi Baku
6	MF	Samed Kurbanov	10 July 1953 (aged 26)			Neftchi Baku
7	GK	Aleksandr Miroşnikov	20 November 1958 (aged 20)			Neftchi Baku
8	MF	Asif Aliyev	10 February 1956 (aged 23)			Neftchi Baku
9	MF	Vladimir Mixalevskiy	29 November 1959 (aged 19)			Neftchi Baku
10	FW	Səmədağa Şıxlarov	5 September 1955 (aged 23)			Neftchi Baku
11	FW	Fizuli Djavadov	20 December 1950 (aged 28)			Neftchi Baku
12	FW	Şakir Garibov	15 January 1956 (aged 23)			Neftchi Baku
13	MF	Igor Ponomaryov	24 February 1960 (aged 19)			Neftchi Baku
14	MF	Vagif Ibragimov	11 November 1956 (aged 22)			Neftchi Baku
15	MF	Abdulgani Nurmamedov	16 September 1955 (aged 23)			Neftchi Baku
16	FW	Oleg Axanov	13 February 1959 (aged 20)			Neftchi Baku
17	DF	Valeriy Ogirchuk	13 April 1958 (aged 21)			Neftchi Baku
18	DF	Serhiy Pavlenko	31 August 1951 (aged 27)			Neftchi Baku
19	MF	Hryhoriy Sapozhnikov	30 October 1950 (aged 28)			Neftchi Baku
20	MF	Rauf Ismailov	1956 (aged 23)			Neftchi Baku

=== Georgian SSR ===
Head coach: Nodar Akhalkatsi (Dinamo Tbilisi), assistant: Kakhi Asatiani (Dinamo Tbilisi)

Whole squad was based on the senior team of FC Dinamo Tbilisi.

No.	Pos.	Player	Date of birth (age)	Caps	Goals	Club
1	GK	Davit Gogia	17 January 1948 (aged 31)			Dinamo Tbilisi
2	MF	Tengiz Sulakvelidze	18 December 1951 (aged 27)			Dinamo Tbilisi
3	DF	Aleksandre Chivadze	8 April 1955 (aged 24)			Dinamo Tbilisi
4	DF	Shota Khinchagashvili	9 January 1951 (aged 28)			Dinamo Tbilisi
5	DF	Gocha Machaidze	21 June 1950 (aged 29)			Dinamo Tbilisi
6	MF	Vitaly Daraselia	9 October 1957 (aged 21)			Dinamo Tbilisi
7	MF	Manuchar Machaidze	25 March 1949 (aged 30)			Dinamo Tbilisi
8	MF	Vakhtang Koridze	24 December 1949 (aged 29)			Dinamo Tbilisi
9	FW	Vladimir Gutsaev	21 December 1952 (aged 26)			Dinamo Tbilisi
10	MF	Nugzar Kakilashvili	28 May 1960 (aged 19)			Dinamo Tbilisi
11	FW	Ramaz Shengelia	1 January 1957 (aged 22)			Dinamo Tbilisi
12	DF	Davit Mujiri	7 April 1956 (aged 23)			Dinamo Tbilisi
13	MF	Vakhtang Kopaleishvili	26 December 1954 (aged 24)			Dinamo Tbilisi
14	MF	Amirani Minashvili	26 June 1956 (aged 23)			Dinamo Tbilisi
15	DF	Piruz Kanteladze	4 January 1949 (aged 30)			Dinamo Tbilisi
16	DF	Georgi Tavadze	21 June 1955 (aged 24)			Dinamo Tbilisi
17	GK	Otar Gabelia	24 March 1953 (aged 26)			Dinamo Tbilisi
18	DF	Georgi Chilaya	26 June 1957 (aged 22)			Dinamo Tbilisi
19	FW	Revaz Chelebadze	2 October 1955 (aged 23)			Dinamo Tbilisi
20	FW	Malkhaz Bolkvadze	1959 (aged 20)			Dinamo Tbilisi

=== Lithuanian SSR ===
Head coach: Benjaminas Zelkevičius (Žalgiris Vilnius), assistant: Stanislovas Ramjalis (Žalgiris Vilnius)

Except for one player (see the roster), whole squad was based on the senior team of FC Žalgiris Vilnius.

No.	Pos.	Player	Date of birth (age)	Caps	Goals	Club
1	GK	Valerij Kurskij	30 September 1949 (aged 29)			Žalgiris Vilnius
2	MF	Gediminas Paberžis	16 October 1950 (aged 28)			Žalgiris Vilnius
3	DF	Kęstutis Latoža	2 August 1950 (aged 28)			Žalgiris Vilnius
4	DF	Kęstutis Gražulis	8 June 1956 (aged 23)			Žalgiris Vilnius
5	DF	Arvydas Janonis	6 November 1960 (aged 18)			Žalgiris Vilnius
6	MF	Vytautas Gedgaudas	24 May 1948 (aged 31)			Žalgiris Vilnius
7	MF	Gennadiy Zharkov	5 March 1954 (aged 25)			Žalgiris Vilnius
8	MF	Algimantas Mackevičius	28 May 1958 (aged 21)			Žalgiris Vilnius
9	FW	Jevgenij Rjabov	3 February 1951 (aged 28)			Žalgiris Vilnius
10	MF	Juzef Jurgelevič	15 April 1947 (aged 32)			Žalgiris Vilnius
11	FW	Vytautas Dirmeikis	10 October 1949 (aged 29)			Žalgiris Vilnius
12	FW	Ruslanas Rudzevičius	13 November 1956 (aged 22)			Žalgiris Vilnius
13	MF	Stasys Danisevičius	17 September 1957 (aged 21)			Žalgiris Vilnius
14	MF	Valerij Kroman	25 September 1952 (aged 26)			Žalgiris Vilnius
15	DF	Rimantas Turskis	3 July 1957 (aged 22)			Žalgiris Vilnius
16	GK	Vaclovas Jurkus	23 February 1958 (aged 21)			Žalgiris Vilnius
17	FW	Sigitas Jakubauskas	29 December 1958 (aged 20)			Žalgiris Vilnius
18	DF	Valdas Kasparavičius	17 January 1958 (aged 21)			Žalgiris Vilnius
19	MF	Edvardas Malkevičius	2 January 1957 (aged 22)			Žalgiris Vilnius
20	FW	Jevgenij Kurguznikov	26 June 1954 (aged 25)			Atlantas Klaipėda

=== Russian SFSR ===
Head coach: Vladimir Ivashkov, assistant: Nikolai Samarin (SKA Rostov-na-Donu)

No.	Pos.	Player	Date of birth (age)	Caps	Goals	Club
1	GK	Viktor Radayev	11 March 1954 (aged 25)			SKA Rostov-na-Donu
2	DF	Nikolai Vikharev	6 August 1951 (aged 27)			Shinnik Yaroslavl
3	DF	Aleksandr Andryushchenko	2 November 1954 (aged 24)			SKA Rostov-na-Donu
4	DF	Aleksandr Kupriyanov	23 June 1952 (aged 27)			Krylia Sovetov Kuybyshev
5	DF	Viktor Bondarenko	13 June 1949 (aged 30)			SKA Rostov-na-Donu
6	MF	Vladimir Aleksandrov	9 January 1954 (aged 25)			Zvezda Perm
7	MF	Valerian Panfilov	3 October 1950 (aged 28)			Krylia Sovetov Kuybyshev
8	DF	Ruslan Suanov	9 December 1953 (aged 25)			Spartak Ordzhonikidze
9	FW	Aleksandr Ploshnik	21 April 1955 (aged 24)			Kuban Krasnodar
10	FW	Sergey Andreyev	16 May 1956 (aged 23)			SKA Rostov-na-Donu
11	FW	Vitaly Razdayev	13 October 1946 (aged 32)			Kuzbass Kemerovo
12	FW	Aleksandr Markin	10 October 1949 (aged 29)			SKA Rostov-na-Donu
13	DF	Yuriy Churkin	9 November 1953 (aged 25)			SKA Rostov-na-Donu
14	MF	Viktor Shishkin	8 February 1955 (aged 24)			Uralmash Sverdlovsk
15	MF	Kurban Berdyev	25 August 1952 (aged 26)			SKA Rostov-na-Donu
16	GK	Hennadiy Lysenchuk	18 December 1947 (aged 31)			Krylia Sovetov Kuybyshev
17	MF	Sergei Selin	26 April 1956 (aged 23)			SKA Rostov-na-Donu
18	DF	Viktor Kapayev	29 March 1952 (aged 27)			Krylia Sovetov Kuybyshev
19	DF	Vadim Losev	6 November 1951 (aged 27)			Krylia Sovetov Kuybyshev
20	MF	Ravil Sharipov	19 October 1951 (aged 27)			Spartak Nalchik

=== Uzbek SSR ===
Head coach: Oleh Bazylevych (Pakhtakor Tashkent), assistant: Idgai Tazetdinov (Pakhtakor Tashkent)

Whole squad was based on the senior team of FC Pakhtakor Tashkent.

No.	Pos.	Player	Date of birth (age)	Caps	Goals	Club
1	GK	Sergeý Pokatilow	30 September 1949 (aged 29)			Pakhtakor Tashkent
2	DF	Axmajon Ubaydullayev	18 October 1954 (aged 24)			Pakhtakor Tashkent
3	DF	Olimjon Ashirov	25 January 1955 (aged 24)			Pakhtakor Tashkent
4	DF	Ravil Agishev	14 March 1959 (aged 20)			Pakhtakor Tashkent
5	FW	Vladimir Sabirov	14 January 1958 (aged 21)			Pakhtakor Tashkent
6	MF	Aleksandr Korchenov	4 May 1949 (aged 30)			Pakhtakor Tashkent
7	MF	Konstantin Bakanov	25 May 1954 (aged 25)			Pakhtakor Tashkent
8	MF	Mikhail An	19 February 1952 (aged 27)			Pakhtakor Tashkent
9	FW	Shuhrat Eshbo’taеv	8 February 1959 (aged 20)			Pakhtakor Tashkent
10	FW	Vladimir Fyodorov	5 January 1955 (aged 24)			Pakhtakor Tashkent
11	FW	Viktor Churkin	25 January 1952 (aged 27)			Pakhtakor Tashkent
12	DF	Gennadiy Denisov	20 August 1960 (aged 18)			Pakhtakor Tashkent
13	MF	Nikolai Kulikov	25 April 1953 (aged 26)			Pakhtakor Tashkent
14	MF	Axmedjon Musayev	12 January 1959 (aged 20)			Pakhtakor Tashkent
15	FW	Konstantin Novikov	21 September 1961 (aged 17)			Pakhtakor Tashkent
16	GK	Aleksandr Yanovskiy	1 November 1952 (aged 26)			Pakhtakor Tashkent
17	FW	Turaberdy Shaymardanov	24 January 1958 (aged 21)			Pakhtakor Tashkent
18	DF	Vyacheslav Shirin	27 October 1959 (aged 19)			Pakhtakor Tashkent
19	DF	Dmitriy Roman	31 May 1959 (aged 20)			Pakhtakor Tashkent

=== Ukrainian SSR ===
Head coach: Valeriy Lobanovskyi (Dynamo Kyiv), assistant: Volodymyr Bohdanovych

No.	Pos.	Player	Date of birth (age)	Caps	Goals	Club
1	GK	Yuriy Romenskyi	1 August 1952 (aged 26)			Dynamo Kyiv
2	MF	Anatoliy Konkov	19 September 1949 (aged 29)			Dynamo Kyiv
3	DF	Serhiy Baltacha	17 February 1958 (aged 21)			Dynamo Kyiv
4	DF	Anatoliy Demyanenko	19 February 1959 (aged 20)			Dynamo Kyiv
5	DF	Serhiy Zhuravlyov	24 April 1959 (aged 20)			Dynamo Kyiv
6	MF	Volodymyr Lozynskyi	6 January 1955 (aged 24)			Dynamo Kyiv
7	MF	Leonid Buryak	10 July 1953 (aged 26)			Dynamo Kyiv
8	MF	Aleksandr Khapsalis	17 October 1957 (aged 21)			Dynamo Kyiv
9	MF	Viktor Kolotov	3 July 1949 (aged 30)			Dynamo Kyiv
10	MF	Anatoliy Doroshenko	14 August 1953 (aged 25)			Chornomorets Odesa
11	FW	Oleh Blokhin	5 November 1952 (aged 26)			Dynamo Kyiv
12	MF	Oleksandr Berezhnoy	8 December 1957 (aged 21)			Dynamo Kyiv
13	DF	Vyacheslav Leshchuk	24 December 1951 (aged 27)			Chornomorets Odesa
14	MF	Volodymyr Bezsonov	5 March 1958 (aged 21)			Dynamo Kyiv
15	MF	Stepan Yurchyshyn	28 August 1957 (aged 21)			Karpaty Lviv
16	FW	Volodymyr Rohovsky	28 February 1954 (aged 25)			Shakhtar Donetsk
17	GK	Yuriy Dehteryov	5 October 1948 (aged 30)			Shakhtar Donetsk
18	FW	Vitaliy Starukhin	6 June 1949 (aged 30)			Shakhtar Donetsk
19	MF	Mykola Fedorenko	31 July 1955 (aged 23)			Shakhtar Donetsk
20	MF	Volodymyr Pianykh	5 February 1951 (aged 28)			Shakhtar Donetsk

=== Tajik SSR ===
Head coach: Mark Tunis (Pamir Dushanbe), assistant: Sharif Nazarov (Pamir Dushanbe)

Whole squad was based on the senior team of FC Pamir Dushanbe.

No.	Pos.	Player	Date of birth (age)	Caps	Goals	Club
1	GK	Vladimir Trostenyuk	4 February 1954 (aged 25)			Pamir Dushanbe
2	DF	Abdullo Muradov	1956 (aged ~23)			Pamir Dushanbe
3	DF	Mustafo Bilolov	4 June 1957 (aged 22)			Pamir Dushanbe
4	DF	Nikolay Saprykin	16 January 1953 (aged 26)			Pamir Dushanbe
5	DF	Vyacheslav Mosyagin	16 May 1954 (aged 25)			Pamir Dushanbe
6	MF	Shukhrat Azamov	12 February 1953 (aged 26)			Pamir Dushanbe
7	MF	Viktor Raimdzhanov	1951 (aged ~28)			Pamir Dushanbe
8	MF	Anatoliy Rodionov	24 April 1953 (aged 26)			Pamir Dushanbe
9	FW	Edgar Gess	14 March 1954 (aged 25)			Pamir Dushanbe
10	DF	Gennadiy Cherevchenko	16 March 1948 (aged 31)			Pamir Dushanbe
11	FW	Valeriy Tursunov	23 August 1954 (aged 24)			Pamir Dushanbe
12	MF	Aleksandr Tarbayev	1950 (aged ~29)			Pamir Dushanbe
13	FW	Nuritdin Amriyev	13 March 1959 (aged 20)			Pamir Dushanbe
14	DF	Vladimir Yermolayev	30 May 1961 (aged 18)			Pamir Dushanbe
15	FW	Vyacheslav Didych	15 February 1959 (aged 20)			Pamir Dushanbe
16	DF	Leonid Kirilenko	29 July 1945 (aged 33)			Pamir Dushanbe
17	MF	Oleksiy Cherednyk	15 September 1960 (aged 18)			Pamir Dushanbe
18	MF	Abdugapor Yuldashev	13 September 1957 (aged 21)			Pamir Dushanbe
19	GK	Stanislav Karasyov	1 July 1947 (aged 32)			Pamir Dushanbe
20	GK	Valeri Sarychev	12 January 1960 (aged 19)			Pamir Dushanbe

=== Belorussian SSR ===
Head coach: Eduard Malofeyev (Dinamo Minsk), assistant: Leonid Harai (Dinamo Minsk)

Whole squad was based on the senior team of FC Dinamo Minsk.

No.	Pos.	Player	Date of birth (age)	Caps	Goals	Club
1	GK	Mikhail Verheyenka	12 January 1950 (aged 29)			Dinamo Minsk
2	DF	Siarhei Borowski	29 January 1956 (aged 23)			Dinamo Minsk
3	DF	Yuri Kurnenin	4 June 1957 (aged 22)			Dinamo Minsk
4	MF	Alyaksandar Alyakseichikaw	3 April 1958 (aged 21)			Dinamo Minsk
5	DF	Valery Shaveyko	4 February 1956 (aged 23)			Dinamo Minsk
6	MF	Alyaksandar Prakapenka	16 November 1953 (aged 25)			Dinamo Minsk
7	FW	Anatoly Baidachny	1 October 1952 (aged 26)			Dinamo Minsk
8	MF	Yuri Pudyshev	3 April 1954 (aged 25)			Dinamo Minsk
9	DF	Mykola Pavlov	20 June 1954 (aged 25)			Dinamo Minsk
10	MF	Uladzimir Kurnew	12 September 1950 (aged 28)			Dinamo Minsk
11	FW	Pyotar Vasilewski	29 June 1956 (aged 23)			Dinamo Minsk
12	MF	Valeriy Melnikov	21 October 1959 (aged 19)			Dinamo Minsk
13	DF	Ihar Byalow	21 October 1954 (aged 24)			Dinamo Minsk
14	FW	Ihar Hurynovich	5 March 1960 (aged 19)			Dinamo Minsk
15	DF	Viktar Yanushewski	23 January 1960 (aged 19)			Dinamo Minsk
16	GK	Yury Kurbyka	26 February 1956 (aged 23)			Dinamo Minsk
17	MF	Alyaksandar Pryazhnikaw	27 May 1954 (aged 25)			Dinamo Minsk
18	MF	Syarhei Gotsmanaw	27 March 1959 (aged 20)			Dinamo Minsk
19	MF	Syarhei Korbut	8 June 1955 (aged 24)			Dinamo Minsk
20	DF	Liudas Rumbutsis	24 November 1955 (aged 23)			Dinamo Minsk

=== Latvian SSR ===
Head coach: Gennadi Bondarenko (Daugava Riga), assistant: Boris Reingold

No.	Pos.	Player	Date of birth (age)	Caps	Goals	Club
1	GK	Aleksandrs Kulakovs	14 April 1956 (aged 23)			Daugava Riga
2	DF	Igor Nikishin	7 May 1957 (aged 22)			Daugava Riga
3	DF	Sergei Yegorov	13 February 1958 (aged 21)			Daugava Riga
4	DF	Dainis Deglis	26 January 1959 (aged 20)			Daugava Riga
5	DF	Dmitriy Izgurskiy	3 May 1953 (aged 26)			Daugava Riga
6	DF	Valeriy Leitan	1955 (aged ~24)			Daugava Riga
7	FW	Yevgeniy Kasian	31 October 1950 (aged 28)			Daugava Riga
8	FW	Anatoliy Kondratenko	11 June 1949 (aged 30)			Zvejnieks Liepāja
9	MF	Yuriy Romanenkov	13 September 1950 (aged 28)			Zvejnieks Liepāja
10	FW	Aleksandrs Starkovs	26 July 1955 (aged 23)			Daugava Riga
11	FW	Mikhail Smorodin	22 August 1951 (aged 27)			Daugava Riga
12	MF	Valeriy Semyonov	7 August 1958 (aged 20)			Daugava Riga
13	MF	Yuris Šukevich	1959 (aged ~20)			Daugava Riga
14	DF	Aivar Narisov	1952 (aged ~27)			Daugava Riga
15	DF	Yuris Ernštreits	22 July 1953 (aged 25)			Zvejnieks Liepāja
16	GK	Viktor Druzhynin	13 December 1954 (aged 24)			Daugava Riga
17	FW	Aleksandr Yurin	18 May 1958 (aged 21)			Zvejnieks Liepāja
18	GK	Igor Belov	27 May 1952 (aged 27)			Zvejnieks Liepāja
19	MF	Valeriy Osipchikov	4 April 1961 (aged 18)			Daugava Riga
20	MF	Genādijs Šitiks	24 November 1955 (aged 23)			Daugava Riga

=== Armenian SSR ===
Head coach: Yozhef Betsa (Ararat Yerevan), assistant: Grachik Khachmanukyan

Whole squad was based on the senior team of FC Ararat Yerevan.

No.	Pos.	Player	Date of birth (age)	Caps	Goals	Club
1	GK	Vladimir Vasiliev	18 March 1953 (aged 26)			Ararat Yerevan
2	MF	Samvel Petrosyan	27 September 1954 (aged 24)			Ararat Yerevan
3	DF	Ashot Khachatryan	3 August 1959 (aged 19)			Ararat Yerevan
4	DF	Serhiy Bondarenko	9 November 1948 (aged 30)			Ararat Yerevan
5	DF	Artyom Movsesyan	27 September 1954 (aged 24)			Ararat Yerevan
6	MF	Aleksandr Keropyan	26 May 1956 (aged 23)			Ararat Yerevan
7	FW	Robert Galustyan	15 November 1958 (aged 20)			Ararat Yerevan
8	MF	Khoren Oganesian	10 January 1955 (aged 24)			Ararat Yerevan
9	FW	Andranik Khachatryan	30 June 1956 (aged 23)			Ararat Yerevan
10	FW	Babken Melikyan	3 April 1960 (aged 19)			Ararat Yerevan
11	MF	Ashot Saakyan	19 June 1958 (aged 21)			Ararat Yerevan
12	DF	Armen Sarkisyan	1 January 1953 (aged 26)			Ararat Yerevan
13	FW	Sergei Zakaryan	22 January 1959 (aged 20)			Ararat Yerevan
14	FW	Samvel Navasardyan	1958 (aged ~21)			Ararat Yerevan
15	MF	Grigor Badalyan	8 August 1959 (aged 19)			Ararat Yerevan
16	GK	Ashot Tatevosyan	1956 (aged ~23)			Ararat Yerevan
17	MF	Samvel Pogosyan	13 December 1959 (aged 19)			Ararat Yerevan
18	GK	David Azizyan	1959 (aged ~20)			Ararat Yerevan
19	DF	Eduard Khachatryan	1955 (aged ~24)			Ararat Yerevan
20	FW	Samvel Kasaboglyan	20 December 1955 (aged 23)			Ararat Yerevan

=== Leningrad ===
Head coach: Yury Morozov (Zenit Leningrad), assistant: Vadim Kharovitskiy (Zenit Leningrad)

No.	Pos.	Player	Date of birth (age)	Caps	Goals	Club
1	GK	Oleksandr Tkachenko	24 January 1947 (aged 32)			Zenit Leningrad
2	DF	Anatoli Davydov	13 November 1953 (aged 25)			Zenit Leningrad
3	DF	Mikhail Lokhov	30 December 1948 (aged 30)			Zenit Leningrad
4	DF	Vladimir Golubev	16 April 1950 (aged 29)			Zenit Leningrad
5	DF	Sergei Bondarenko	15 April 1955 (aged 24)			Zenit Leningrad
6	MF	Aleksandr Rasputin	9 May 1953 (aged 26)			Zenit Leningrad
7	MF	Nikolay Larionov	19 January 1957 (aged 22)			Zenit Leningrad
8	FW	Vladimir Kazachyonok	6 September 1952 (aged 26)			Zenit Leningrad
9	FW	Andrei Redkous	13 June 1957 (aged 22)			Zenit Leningrad
10	MF	Vyacheslav Melnikov	7 March 1954 (aged 25)			Zenit Leningrad
11	FW	Vladimir Klementyev	4 January 1956 (aged 23)			Zenit Leningrad
12	DF	Valeriy Yakimtsov	28 October 1952 (aged 26)			Zenit Leningrad
13	MF	Vyacheslav Dekteryov	30 November 1954 (aged 24)			Zenit Leningrad
14	DF	Vladimir Lagoida	4 August 1954 (aged 24)			Zenit Leningrad
15	FW	Anatoli Zinchenko	8 August 1949 (aged 29)			Zenit Leningrad
16	GK	Oleg Kuznetsov	1 June 1960 (aged 19)			Zenit Leningrad
17	DF	Sergei Shvetsov	7 July 1960 (aged 19)			Zenit Leningrad
18	FW	Yuriy Timofeyev	31 October 1957 (aged 21)			Dynamo Leningrad
19	MF	Yuri Zheludkov	8 March 1959 (aged 20)			Dynamo Leningrad

== See also ==
- 1979 Dniprodzerzhynsk mid-air collision
