= 1979 Soviet Cup final =

- Event: 1979 Soviet Cup
Dynamo Moscow	Dinamo Tbilisi
0	0
- Date: 11 August 1979
- Venue: Lenin's Central Stadium, Moscow
- Referee: Myroslav Stupar (Stanislav)
- Attendance: 60,000

The 1979 Soviet Cup final was a football match that took place at the Lenin's Central Stadium, Moscow on 11 August 1979. The match was the 38th Soviet Cup final and it was contested by Dynamo Moscow and Dinamo Tbilisi.

After a goalless draw in regulation time and after extra time, Dinamo Tbilisi defeated Dynamo Moscow 5–4 on penalties to win the cup for the second time. It was the second and final time that a team from the Georgian Soviet Socialist Republic had won the cup and the sixth time in seven seasons in which a team from outside the Russian Soviet Federative Socialist Republic won the competition.

As winners of the competition, Dinamo Tbilisi qualified to represent the Soviet Union in the 1980–81 European Cup Winners' Cup.

== Background ==
Dynamo Moscow had reached the Soviet Cup final on nine previous occasions, winning the trophy five times (in 1937, 1953, 1967, 1970 and 1977).

Dinamo Tbilisi had reached the final on six previous occasions, winning the trophy once after defeating Ararat Yerevan 3–0 in 1976. They were the only team from the Georgian Soviet Socialist Republic to reach the final.

The two teams had met twice before in the final of the competition. Dynamo Moscow won both encounters – 5–2 in 1937 and 2–1 in 1970.

In the previous six seasons, Ararat Yerevan (2), Dynamo Kyiv (2) and Dinamo Tbilisi (1) had all won the cup from outside the Russian Soviet Federative Socialist Republic. Dynamo Moscow's triumph in 1977 was the only win by a Russian side in that time.

== Road to Final ==
Dynamo Moscow

Zone 4	Dynamo Moscow	2–0	Kairat
Zone 4	Dynamo Moscow	1–0	Shinnik Yaroslavl
Zone 4	Dynamo Moscow	4–0	Kolhozchi
Zone 4	Dynamo Moscow	1–0	Metalist Kharkiv
Zone 4	Dynamo Moscow	3–0	Automobilist Termez
Quarter-final	Dynamo Moscow	3–0	Spartak Moscow
Semi-final	Dynamo Moscow	2–1 aet	Karpaty Lviv

Dinamo Tbilisi

Zone 1	Dinamo Tbilisi	2–1	Dynamo Leningrad
Zone 1	Dinamo Tbilisi	5–0	Zorya Voroshilovgrad
Zone 1	Dinamo Tbilisi	2–1	SKA Rostov-on-Don
Zone 1	Dinamo Tbilisi	3–0	Torpedo Kutaisi
Zone 1	Dinamo Tbilisi	2–0	Uralmash
Quarter-final	Dinamo Tbilisi	2–0	Krylia Sovetov
Semi-final	CSKA Moscow	1–2 aet	Dinamo Tbilisi

== Match details ==
11 August 1979

Dynamo Moscow	0–0	Dinamo Tbilisi
Penalties
Makhovikov (penalty missed); Maksimenkov (penalty scored); Petrushin (penalty missed); Pavlenko (penalty scored); Bubnov (penalty scored); Tolstykh (penalty scored); Gazzaev (penalty missed)	4–5	(penalty missed) Kipiani; (penalty missed) Gutsaev; (penalty scored) Chivadze; (penalty scored) Daraselia; (penalty scored) Shengelia; (penalty scored) Machaidze; (penalty scored) Sulakvelidze

Lenin's Central Stadium, Moscow
Attendance: 60,000
Referee: Myroslav Stupar (Stanislav)

Dynamo Moscow:
GK	(Russian Soviet Federative Socialist Republic) Nikolai Gontar
DF	(Russian Soviet Federative Socialist Republic) Evgeny Lovchev
DF	(Tajik Soviet Socialist Republic) Sergei Nikulin
DF	(Russian Soviet Federative Socialist Republic) Aleksandr Makhovikov (c)
DF	(Russian Soviet Federative Socialist Republic) Aleksandr Bubnov
MF	(Russian Soviet Federative Socialist Republic) Aleksei Petrushin
MF	(Russian Soviet Federative Socialist Republic) Nikolai Kolesov (substituted off) 80'
MF	(Russian Soviet Federative Socialist Republic) Aleksandr Minayev
MF	(Russian Soviet Federative Socialist Republic) Nikolai Tolstykh
MF	(Russian Soviet Federative Socialist Republic) Aleksandr Maksimenkov
FW	(Russian Soviet Federative Socialist Republic) Valery Gazzaev
Substitutes:
FW	(Russian Soviet Federative Socialist Republic) Vadim Pavlenko (substituted on) 80'
Manager:
(Russian Soviet Federative Socialist Republic) Viktor Tsaryov

Dinamo Tbilisi:
GK	(Georgian Soviet Socialist Republic) Otar Gabelia
DF	(Georgian Soviet Socialist Republic) Tengiz Sulakvelidze
DF	(Georgian Soviet Socialist Republic) Aleksandre Chivadze
DF	(Georgian Soviet Socialist Republic) Shota Khinchagashvili
DF	(Georgian Soviet Socialist Republic) David Mujiri (substituted off) 61'
MF	(Georgian Soviet Socialist Republic) Vitaly Daraselia
MF	(Georgian Soviet Socialist Republic) Manuchar Machaidze (c)
MF	(Georgian Soviet Socialist Republic) Vakhtang Koridze (substituted off) 46'
MF	(Georgian Soviet Socialist Republic) Vladimir Gutsaev
MF	(Georgian Soviet Socialist Republic) Gocha Machaidze
FW	(Georgian Soviet Socialist Republic) Ramaz Shengelia
Substitutes:
FW	(Georgian Soviet Socialist Republic) David Kipiani (substituted on) 46'
FW	(Georgian Soviet Socialist Republic) Nugzar Kakilashvili (substituted on) 61'
Manager:
(Georgian Soviet Socialist Republic) Nodar Akhalkatsi

== Aftermath ==
Following their cup win, Dinamo Tbilisi represented the Soviet Union in the 1980–81 European Cup Winners' Cup. They would win the competition after defeating Carl Zeiss Jena of East Germany 2–0 in the final at the Rheinstadion in Düsseldorf, West Germany.

== See also ==
- 1979 Soviet Top League
