= 1976 Soviet Cup final =

- Event: 1976 Soviet Cup
| Dinamo Tbilisi | Ararat Yerevan |
| 3 | 0 |
- Date: 3 September 1976
- Venue: Lenin's Central Stadium, Moscow
- Referee: Pavel Kazakov (Moscow)
- Attendance: 45,000

The 1976 Soviet Cup final was a football match that took place at the Lenin's Central Stadium, Moscow on 3 September 1976. The match was the 35th Soviet Cup final and it was contested by defending champions Ararat Yerevan and Dinamo Tbilisi.

Goals from David Kipiani, Piruz Kanteladze and Revaz Chelebadze helped Dinamo Tbilisi to a 3–0 win as they won the cup for the first time. It was the first time that a team from the Georgian Soviet Socialist Republic had won the cup and the fourth successive season in which a team from outside the Russian Soviet Federative Socialist Republic won the competition.

== Background ==
Ararat Yerevan had reached the Soviet Cup final twice before, defeating Dynamo Kyiv 2–1 after extra time in 1973 and Zaria Voroshilovgrad 2–1 in 1975. They were the defending champions and the only team from the Armenian Soviet Socialist Republic to reach a final.

Dinamo Tbilisi had reached the final on four previous occasions but had never won the competition before. They were the only team from the Georgian Soviet Socialist Republic to reach the final.

The proceeding three tournaments had been won by Ararat (2) and Dynamo Kyiv (1) meaning this would be the fourth season in a row that a team from outside the Russian Soviet Federative Socialist Republic won the competition.

=== Previous encounters ===
Previously these two teams met each other three times in the competition. Dinamo knocked–out opponents two times, while Ararat have done it once. The club from Tbilisi progressed in 1937, winning the game 4–1 and in 1971 competition 0–0, 2–1, while the club from Yerevan eliminated the opponent in 1975 winning the game 3–1.

== Road to Final ==
All sixteen Soviet Top League clubs including Dinamo and Ararat entered the competition in the second round.

=== Dinamo Tbilisi ===
In the second round Dinamo defeated Metalurh Zaporizhya 5–4 on penalties after a 1–1 draw after extra time. They then defeated Zenit Leningrad 3–0 to advance to the quarter-finals. A 2–1 win against Karpaty Lviv saw them into the semi-finals where they defeated Shakhtar Donetsk 2–0.

=== Ararat Yerevan ===
After defeating SKA Rostov-on-Don 1–0 in the second round, Ararat required extra time to over come Lokomotiv Moscow by the same score line in the third round. In the quarter-finals they defeated CSKA Moscow 2–1 before defeating Dnipro Dnipropetrovsk by the same score line in the semi-final and advancing to the final.

Dinamo Tbilisi

| Round 2 | Metalurh Zaporizhya | 1–1 a.e.t. 4–5 pen. | Dinamo Tbilisi |
| Round 3 | Dinamo Tbilisi | 3–0 | FC Zenit Leningrad |
| Quarter-final | Dinamo Tbilisi | 2–1 | Karpaty Lviv |
| Semi-final | Shakhtar Donetsk | 0–2 | Dinamo Tbilisi |

Ararat Yerevan

| Round 2 | SKA Rostov-on-Don | 0–1 | Ararat Yerevan |
| Round 3 | Lokomotiv Moscow | 0–1 aet | Ararat Yerevan |
| Quarter-final | Ararat Yerevan | 2–1 | CSKA Moscow |
| Semi-final | Ararat Yerevan | 2–1 | Dnipro Dnipropetrovsk |

== Match details ==
3 September 1976

| Dinamo Tbilisi | 3–0 | Ararat Yerevan |
|---|---|---|
| Kipiani 27'; Kanteladze 64' (pen.); Chelebadze 68' |

Lenin's Central Stadium, Moscow
Attendance: 45,000
Referee: Pavel Kazakov (Moscow)

Dinamo Tbilisi:
| GK | (Georgian Soviet Socialist Republic) David Gogia |
| DF | (Georgian Soviet Socialist Republic) Nodar Khizanishvili |
| DF | (Georgian Soviet Socialist Republic) Piruz Kanteladze |
| DF | (Georgian Soviet Socialist Republic) Shota Khinchagashvili |
| DF | (Georgian Soviet Socialist Republic) Zorbeg Ebralidze |
| DF | (Georgian Soviet Socialist Republic) Aleksandre Chivadze |
| MF | (Georgian Soviet Socialist Republic) Manuchar Machaidze (c) |
| MF | (Georgian Soviet Socialist Republic) Revaz Chelebadze |
| MF | (Georgian Soviet Socialist Republic) Vladimir Gutsaev |
| MF | (Georgian Soviet Socialist Republic) David Kipiani (substituted off) 75' |
| FW | (Georgian Soviet Socialist Republic) Vakhtang Kopaleishvili |
Substitutes:
| FW | (Georgian Soviet Socialist Republic) Zurab Tsereteli (substituted on) 75' |
Manager:
(Georgian Soviet Socialist Republic) Nodar Akhalkatsi

Ararat Yerevan:
| GK | (Armenian Soviet Socialist Republic) Avetis Hovsepyan |
| DF | (Armenian Soviet Socialist Republic) Sanasar Gevorgyan |
| DF | (Armenian Soviet Socialist Republic) Armenak Sargsyan (c) |
| DF | (Azerbaijan Soviet Socialist Republic) Alexander Mirzoyan |
| DF | (Armenian Soviet Socialist Republic) Norayr Mesropyan |
| MF | (Armenian Soviet Socialist Republic) Samvel Petrosyan |
| MF | (Armenian Soviet Socialist Republic) Artyom Parsadanyan |
| MF | (Armenian Soviet Socialist Republic) Khoren Oganesian (substituted off) 89' |
| FW | (Armenian Soviet Socialist Republic) Alexander Keropyan |
| MF | (Turkmen Soviet Socialist Republic) Nazar Petrosyan |
| FW | (Armenian Soviet Socialist Republic) Robert Halaydzhyan (substituted off) 46' |
Substitutes:
| FW | (Armenian Soviet Socialist Republic) Nikolay Ghazaryan (substituted on) 46' |
| MF | (Armenian Soviet Socialist Republic) Armen Azaryan (substituted on) 89' |
Manager:
(Azerbaijan Soviet Socialist Republic) Eduard Markarov

Soviet Cup 1976 Winners
Dinamo Tbilisi
First title

== See also ==
- 1976 Soviet Top League
