= 1976 Soviet First League =

Soviet First League
- Season: 1976

The 1976 Soviet First League was the sixth season of the Soviet First League and the 36th season of the Soviet second tier league competition.

== Final standings ==
| Pos | Rep | Team | Pld | W | D | L | GF | GA | GD | Pts | Promotion or relegation |
|---|---|---|---|---|---|---|---|---|---|---|---|
| 1 | KAZ | (Kazakh Soviet Socialist Republic) Kairat Alma-Ata | 38 | 24 | 8 | 6 | 55 | 23 | +32 | 56 | Promoted |
| 2 | AZE | (Azerbaijan Soviet Socialist Republic) Neftçi Baku | 38 | 22 | 10 | 6 | 70 | 34 | +36 | 54 | Promoted |
| 3 | UZB | (Uzbek Soviet Socialist Republic) Pahtakor Tashkent | 38 | 18 | 12 | 8 | 63 | 31 | +32 | 48 | |
| 4 | UKR | (Ukrainian Soviet Socialist Republic) Tavriya Simferopol | 38 | 17 | 12 | 9 | 59 | 32 | +27 | 46 | |
| 5 | MDA | (Moldavian Soviet Socialist Republic) Nistru Chișinău | 38 | 15 | 14 | 9 | 51 | 40 | +11 | 44 | |
| 6 | RUS | (Russian Soviet Federative Socialist Republic) Zvezda Perm | 38 | 15 | 12 | 11 | 53 | 45 | +8 | 42 | |
| 7 | GEO | (Georgian Soviet Socialist Republic) Torpedo Kutaisi | 38 | 13 | 15 | 10 | 46 | 38 | +8 | 41 | |
| 8 | RUS | (Russian Soviet Federative Socialist Republic) Kuzbass Kemerovo | 38 | 16 | 7 | 15 | 59 | 50 | +9 | 39 | |
| 9 | TKM | (Turkmen Soviet Socialist Republic) Kolhozchi Ashgabad | 38 | 16 | 7 | 15 | 61 | 62 | −1 | 39 | |
| 10 | RUS | (Russian Soviet Federative Socialist Republic) Shinnik Yaroslavl | 38 | 15 | 8 | 15 | 41 | 39 | +2 | 38 | |
| 11 | TJK | (Tajik Soviet Socialist Republic) Pamir Dushanbe | 38 | 14 | 10 | 14 | 43 | 51 | −8 | 38 | |
| 12 | RUS | (Russian Soviet Federative Socialist Republic) SKA Rostov-on-Don | 38 | 13 | 10 | 15 | 41 | 43 | −2 | 36 | |
| 13 | UKR | (Ukrainian Soviet Socialist Republic) Metalurh Zaporizhzhia | 38 | 14 | 8 | 16 | 38 | 40 | −2 | 36 | |
| 14 | UKR | (Ukrainian Soviet Socialist Republic) Spartak Ivano-Frankivsk | 38 | 13 | 10 | 15 | 47 | 53 | −6 | 36 | |
| 15 | RUS | (Russian Soviet Federative Socialist Republic) Spartak Orzhonikidze | 38 | 11 | 14 | 13 | 40 | 50 | −10 | 36 | |
| 16 | RUS | (Russian Soviet Federative Socialist Republic) Terek Grozny | 38 | 10 | 13 | 15 | 39 | 60 | −21 | 33 | |
| 17 | RUS | (Russian Soviet Federative Socialist Republic) Rubin Kazan | 38 | 6 | 18 | 14 | 39 | 55 | −16 | 30 | |
| 18 | RUS | (Russian Soviet Federative Socialist Republic) Kuban Krasnodar | 38 | 10 | 7 | 21 | 34 | 69 | −35 | 27 | Relegated |
| 19 | LVA | (Latvian Soviet Socialist Republic) Daugava Riga | 38 | 7 | 10 | 21 | 33 | 56 | −23 | 24 | Relegated |
| 20 | RUS | (Russian Soviet Federative Socialist Republic) Elbrus Nalchik | 38 | 5 | 7 | 26 | 32 | 73 | −41 | 17 | Relegated |

Source: rsssf.com

== Top scorers ==
| # | Player | Club | Goals |
|---|---|---|---|
| 1 | Elbrus Abbasov | Neftçi Baku | 28 |
| 2 | Vitaly Razdayev | Kuzbass Kemerovo | 19 |
| 3 | Anatoliy Novikov | Kuzbass Kemerovo | 16 |
| 3 | Vladimir Fyodorov | Pahtakor Tashkent | 16 |
| 4 | Nikolai Smolnikov | Neftçi Baku | 14 |
| 4 | Alexander Ploshnik | Kuban Krasnodar | 14 |
| 4 | Sergei Gorohovodatsky | Kairat Alma-Ata | 14 |
| 5 | Yevgeniy Piunovskiy | Nistru Chișinău | 13 |

== Number of teams by union republic ==
| Rank | Union republic | Number of teams | Club(s) |
|---|---|---|---|
| 1 | RSFSR | 9 | Zvezda Perm, Kuzbass Kemerevo, Shinnik Yaroslavl, SKA Rostov-na-Donu, Spartak Ordzhonikidze, Terek Grozny, Rubin Kazan, Kuban Krasnodar, Elbrus Nalchik |
| 2 | Ukrainian SSR | 3 | Tavria Simferopol, Metallurg Zaporozhye, Prykarpatye Ivano-Frankovsk |
| 3 | Kazakh SSR | 1 | Kairat Alma-Ata |
| 3 | Azerbaijan SSR | 1 | Neftchi Baku |
| 3 | Uzbek SSR | 1 | Pakhtakor Tashkent |
| 3 | Moldavian SSR | 1 | Nistru Kishinev |
| 3 | Georgian SSR | 1 | Torpedo Kutaisi |
| 3 | Turkmen SSR | 1 | Kolhozchi Ashkhabad |
| 3 | Tajik SSR | 1 | Pamir Dushanbe |
| 3 | Latvian SSR | 1 | Daugave Riga |

== See also ==
- Soviet First League
