= Armen Sarkisyan =

Armen Sarkisyan may refer to:

- Armen Sarkissian (23 June 1952–), 4th president of Armenia.
- Armen Sargsyan (20 September 1978–3 February 2025), Armenian-born Ukrainian separatist killed in a bomb blast.
- Armen Sarkisyan (footballer) (1 January 1953–), who played football at the 1979 Spartakiad of the Peoples of the USSR.
