= 1979 in Soviet football =

Football in the Soviet Union
- Season: 1979

Men's football
- Top League: Spartak Moscow
- First League: Karpaty Lvov
- Second League: Iskra Smolensk (Group 1); Kolos Nikopol (Group 2); Dinamo Stavropol (Group 3); Guria Lanchkhuti (Group 4); Buston Dzhizak (Group 5); SKA Khabarovsk (Group 6)
- Soviet Cup: Dinamo Tbilisi

The 1979 Soviet football championship was the 48th seasons of competitive football in the Soviet Union. Spartak Moscow won the Top League championship becoming the Soviet domestic champions for the tenth time.

== Honours ==
Competition		Winner	Runner-up
Top League		Spartak Moscow (10)	Shakhter Donetsk
First League		Karpaty Lvov (2)	Kuban Krasnodar
Second League	Group 1	Iskra Smolensk	Tekstilschik Ivanovo
Second League	Group 2	Kolos Nikopol	SKA Kiev
Second League	Group 3	Dinamo Stavropol	Rotor Volgograd
Second League	Group 4	Guria Lanchkhuti	Lokomotiv Samtredia
Second League	Group 5	Buston Dzhizak	Shakhrikhanets Shakhrikhan
Second League	Group 6	SKA Khabarovsk	Shakhter Karaganda
Soviet Cup		Dinamo Tbilisi (2)	Dinamo Moscow

Notes = Number in parentheses is the times that club has won that honour. * indicates new record for competition

== Soviet Union football championship ==
=== Top League ===
Pos	Team	Pld	W	D	L	GF	GA	GD	Pts	Qualification or relegation
1	(Russian Soviet Federative Socialist Republic) Spartak Moscow (C)	34	21	10	3	66	25	+41	50 (Note: 2 points deducted (8 draw limit))	Qualification for European Cup first round
2	(Ukrainian Soviet Socialist Republic) Shakhtar Donetsk	34	20	8	6	57	33	+24	48	Qualification for UEFA Cup first round
3	(Ukrainian Soviet Socialist Republic) Dynamo Kyiv	34	21	5	8	51	26	+25	47	Qualification for UEFA Cup first round
4	(Georgian Soviet Socialist Republic) Dinamo Tbilisi	34	19	12	3	54	27	+27	46 (Note: 4 points deducted (8 draw limit))	Qualification for Cup Winners' Cup first round
5	(Russian Soviet Federative Socialist Republic) Dynamo Moscow	34	17	9	8	41	27	+14	42 (Note: 1 point deducted (8 draw limit))	Qualification for UEFA Cup first round
6	(Byelorussian Soviet Socialist Republic) Dinamo Minsk	34	15	6	13	48	38	+10	36	
7	(Armenian Soviet Socialist Republic) Ararat Yerevan	34	12	13	9	44	32	+12	32 (Note: 5 points deducted (8 draw limit))	
8	(Russian Soviet Federative Socialist Republic) CSKA Moscow	34	12	8	14	46	46	0	32	
9	(Uzbek Soviet Socialist Republic) Pakhtakor Tashkent	34	11	9	14	42	53	−11	30	
10	(Russian Soviet Federative Socialist Republic) Zenit Leningrad	34	11	9	14	41	45	−4	30	
11	(Ukrainian Soviet Socialist Republic) Chornomorets Odessa	34	10	11	13	32	37	−5	28 (Note: 3 points deducted (8 draw limit))	
12	(Russian Soviet Federative Socialist Republic) Lokomotiv Moscow	34	8	12	14	44	57	−13	24	
13	(Kazakh Soviet Socialist Republic) Kairat Alma-Ata	34	8	9	17	29	44	−15	24	
14	(Azerbaijan Soviet Socialist Republic) Neftchi Baku	34	8	8	18	29	50	−21	24	
15	(Russian Soviet Federative Socialist Republic) SKA Rostov-on-Don	34	8	14	12	37	50	−13	24 (Note: 6 points deducted (8 draw limit))	
16	(Russian Soviet Federative Socialist Republic) Torpedo Moscow	34	8	9	17	32	46	−14	24	
17	(Ukrainian Soviet Socialist Republic) Zaria Voroshilovgrad (R)	34	6	11	17	41	62	−21	20	Relegation to First League
18	(Russian Soviet Federative Socialist Republic) Krylya Sovetov Kuibyshev (R)	34	7	5	22	24	60	−36	19	Relegation to First League

(C) Champions; (R) Relegated

=== First League ===
Pos	Team	Pld	W	D	L	GF	GA	GD	Pts	Promotion or relegation
1	(Ukrainian Soviet Socialist Republic) Karpaty Lviv (C, P)	46	27	10	9	89	43	+46	64	Promotion to Top League
2	(Russian Soviet Federative Socialist Republic) Kuban Krasnodar (P)	46	22	12	12	70	43	+27	56	Promotion to Top League
3	(Tajik Soviet Socialist Republic) Pamir Dushanbe	46	23	7	16	56	50	+6	53	
4	(Russian Soviet Federative Socialist Republic) Shinnik Yaroslavl	46	20	15	11	50	38	+12	52 (Note: There was a draw limit for the draws earned, 12. Only twelve draws earn a point, in contrast, over the limit draws earn no points.)	
5	(Russian Soviet Federative Socialist Republic) Fakel Voronezh	46	20	10	16	70	54	+16	50	
6	(Lithuanian Soviet Socialist Republic) Žalgiris Vilnius	46	19	10	17	61	54	+7	48	
7	(Ukrainian Soviet Socialist Republic) Metalist Kharkiv	46	19	10	17	43	47	−4	48	
8	(Moldavian Soviet Socialist Republic) Nistru Kishinev	46	18	14	14	53	51	+2	48	
9	(Russian Soviet Federative Socialist Republic) Uralmash Sverdlovsk	46	18	12	16	55	45	+10	48	
10	(Ukrainian Soviet Socialist Republic) Metallurg Zaporozhia	46	19	8	19	69	65	+4	46	
11	(Georgian Soviet Socialist Republic) Torpedo Kutaisi	46	17	15	14	44	40	+4	46	
12	(Russian Soviet Federative Socialist Republic) Kuzbass Kemerovo	46	17	12	17	49	50	−1	46	
13	(Russian Soviet Federative Socialist Republic) Spartak Ordjonikidze	46	19	7	20	49	44	+5	45	
14	(Ukrainian Soviet Socialist Republic) Spartak Ivano-Frankivsk	46	19	7	20	52	61	−9	45	
15	(Ukrainian Soviet Socialist Republic) SKA Odessa	46	17	11	18	54	61	−7	45	
16	(Russian Soviet Federative Socialist Republic) Spartak Nalchik	46	16	12	18	50	48	+2	44	
17	(Ukrainian Soviet Socialist Republic) Dnipro Dnipropetrovsk	46	16	14	16	57	60	−3	44	
18	(Ukrainian Soviet Socialist Republic) Tavria Simferopol	46	16	11	19	50	56	−6	43	
19	(Russian Soviet Federative Socialist Republic) Terek Grozny (R)	46	17	8	21	59	63	−4	42	Relegation to Second League
20	(Russian Soviet Federative Socialist Republic) Zvezda Perm (R)	46	16	9	21	45	56	−11	41	Relegation to Second League
21	(Kazakh Soviet Socialist Republic) Traktor Pavlodar (R)	46	14	11	21	37	57	−20	39	Relegation to Second League
22	(Russian Soviet Federative Socialist Republic) Dinamo Leningrad (R)	46	15	8	23	52	57	−5	38	Relegation to Second League
23	(Turkmen Soviet Socialist Republic) Kolhozchi Ashkhabad (R)	46	11	12	23	41	76	−35	34	Relegation to Second League
24	(Kirghiz Soviet Socialist Republic) Alga Frunze (R)	46	10	9	27	37	73	−36	29	Relegation to Second League

Source: rsssf.com
(C) Champions; (P) Promoted; (R) Relegated

=== Second League ===
==== Group 1 ====
Pos	Rep	Team	Pld	W	D	L	GF	GA	GD	Pts	Promotion
1	RUS	Iskra Smolensk	46	30	13	3	86	26	+60	73	Promoted
2	RUS	Textilshchik Ivanovo	46	25	12	9	69	38	+31	62	
3	BLR	Dinamo Brest	46	24	14	8	77	35	+42	62	
4	RUS	Dinamo Vologda	46	22	16	8	55	38	+17	60	
5	LVA	Daugava Riga	46	26	7	13	97	47	+50	59	
6	RUS	Spartak Kostroma	46	25	9	12	61	36	+25	59	
7	BLR	Khimik Grodno	46	22	13	11	56	33	+23	57	
8	LTU	Atlantas Klaipeda	46	21	14	11	58	39	+19	56	
9	RUS	Saturn Rybinsk	46	21	11	14	62	46	+16	53	
10	RUS	Volga Kalinin	46	20	12	14	55	39	+16	52	
11	RUS	Moskvich Moskva	46	18	16	12	52	41	+11	52	
12	BLR	Dvina Vitebsk	46	15	21	10	49	38	+11	51	
13	RUS	Lokomotiv Kaluga	46	18	14	14	55	37	+18	50	
14	RUS	Dinamo Bryansk	46	21	6	19	60	56	+4	48	
15	LVA	Zvejnieks Liepaja	46	14	16	16	46	55	−9	44	
16	RUS	Sever Murmansk	46	13	13	20	47	68	−21	39	
17	BLR	Dnepr Mogilyov	46	12	13	21	41	62	−21	37	
18	RUS	Krasnaya Presnya Moskva	46	11	12	23	34	67	−33	34	
19	RUS	Mashinostroitel Tula	46	8	18	20	40	72	−32	34	
20	RUS	Volzhanin Kineshma	46	9	11	26	41	71	−30	29	
21	BLR	GomSelMash Gomel	46	7	14	25	34	71	−37	28	
22	RUS	Baltika Kaliningrad	46	8	11	27	34	71	−37	27	
23	RUS	FSM Moskva	46	7	8	31	41	80	−39	22	
24	RUS	Stroitel Cherepovets	46	3	10	33	20	104	−84	16	

==== Group 2 ====
Pos	Team	Pld	W	D	L	GF	GA	GD	Pts	Promotion or relegation
1	Kolos Nikopol (C, P)	46	28	12	6	68	32	+36	68	Promoted
2	SKA Kiev	46	26	12	8	65	32	+33	64	
3	SKA Lviv	46	25	11	10	67	33	+34	61	
4	Avanhard Rivne	46	23	14	9	76	41	+35	60	
5	Bukovyna Chernivtsi	46	24	10	12	55	32	+23	58	
6	Spartak Zhytomyr	46	22	12	12	57	41	+16	56	
7	Krystal Kherson	46	21	10	15	63	45	+18	52	
8	Kryvbas Kryvyi Rih	46	18	16	12	62	47	+15	52	
9	Zirka Kirovohrad	46	20	10	16	44	40	+4	50	
10	Sudnobudivnyk Mykolaiv	46	18	13	15	48	47	+1	49	
11	Kolos Poltava	46	18	9	19	48	52	−4	45	
12	Atlantyka Sevastopol	46	17	9	20	54	62	−8	43	
13	Podillia Khmelnytskyi	46	17	8	21	44	57	−13	42	
14	Dnipro Cherkasy	46	14	13	19	38	49	−11	41	
15	Novator Zhdanov	46	17	6	23	47	54	−7	40	
16	Hoverla Uzhhorod	46	10	19	17	36	46	−10	39	
17	Desna Chernihiv	46	13	12	21	37	57	−20	38	
18	Okean Kerch	46	12	14	20	36	52	−16	38	
19	Frunzenets Sumy	46	13	10	23	47	62	−15	36	
20	Torpedo Lutsk	46	10	16	20	42	69	−27	36	
21	Nyva Vinnytsia	46	11	13	22	36	44	−8	35	
22	Avtomobilist Tiraspol	46	11	13	22	28	47	−19	35	Moldavian SSR
23	Metalurh Dniprodzerzhynsk	46	13	8	25	37	71	−34	34	
24	Shakhtar Horlivka	46	11	10	25	53	76	−23	32	Avoided relegation

(C) Champions; (P) Promoted

==== Group 3 ====
Pos	Team	Pld	W	D	L	GF	GA	GD	Pts	Promotion
1	Dinamo Stavropol	48	37	4	7	91	31	+60	78	Promoted
2	Rotor Volgograd	48	29	8	11	102	36	+66	66	
3	Metallurg Lipetsk (Note: Novolipetsk Lipetsk changed name to Metallurg.)	48	28	10	10	75	40	+35	66	
4	Mashuk Pyatigorsk	48	25	8	15	67	46	+21	58	
5	Spartak Oryol	48	24	9	15	82	63	+19	57	
6	Sokol Saratov	48	23	11	14	71	49	+22	57	
7	Volga Gorkiy	48	24	8	16	62	51	+11	56	
8	RostSelMash Rostov-na-Donu	48	24	8	16	92	63	+29	56	
9	Torpedo Taganrog	48	23	9	16	69	50	+19	55	
10	Dinamo Makhachkala	48	23	9	16	75	53	+22	55	
11	Znamya Truda Orekhovo-Zuyevo	48	24	6	18	68	51	+17	54	
12	Khimik Dzerzhinsk	48	21	9	18	59	52	+7	51	
13	Druzhba Maykop	48	20	9	19	56	54	+2	49	
14	Torpedo Vladimir	48	19	11	18	66	59	+7	49	
15	Uralan Elista	48	20	8	20	63	64	−1	48	
16	Spartak Ryazan	48	18	9	21	46	47	−1	45	
17	Salyut Belgorod	48	17	7	24	67	76	−9	41	
18	Stal Cheboksary	48	16	8	24	50	67	−17	40	
19	Revtrud Tambov	48	16	7	25	51	69	−18	39	
20	Cement Novorossiysk	48	12	13	23	37	65	−28	37	
21	Volgar Astrakhan	48	14	8	26	58	84	−26	36	
22	Trud Volzhskiy	48	12	9	27	52	80	−28	33	
23	Avangard Kursk	48	13	6	29	46	87	−41	32	
24	Khimik Novomoskovsk	48	11	9	28	43	87	−44	31	
25	Turbina Syzran	48	4	3	41	32	156	−124	11	

==== Group 4 ====
Pos	Rep	Team	Pld	W	D	L	GF	GA	GD	Pts	Promotion
1	GEO	Guria Lanchkhuti	46	31	4	11	110	50	+60	66	Promoted
2	GEO	Lokomotiv Samtredia	46	28	9	9	109	49	+60	65	
3	AZE	Karabakh Stepanakert	46	29	5	12	65	38	+27	63	
4	RUS	Zenit Izhevsk	46	23	13	10	70	42	+28	59	
5	ARM	Kotaik Abovyan	46	26	6	14	83	43	+40	58	
6	AZE	Araz Nahichevan	46	27	3	16	88	78	+10	57	
7	GEO	Dinamo Zugdidi	46	21	10	15	53	45	+8	52	
8	GEO	Dinamo Sukhumi	46	18	16	12	49	39	+10	52	
9	GEO	Dila Gori	46	21	8	17	74	65	+9	50	
10	GEO	Kolkheti Poti	46	22	5	19	72	55	+17	49	
11	ARM	Shirak Leninakan	46	20	7	19	56	48	+8	47	
12	RUS	Gazovik Orenburg	46	19	9	18	58	66	−8	47	
13	RUS	Gastello Ufa	46	17	10	19	42	47	−5	44	
14	AZE	Hazar Lenkoran	46	19	5	22	54	72	−18	43	
15	GEO	Dinamo Batumi	46	19	5	22	53	65	−12	43	
16	AZE	Avtomobilist Baku	46	17	9	20	54	63	−9	43	
17	RUS	Turbina Naberezhnyye Chelny	46	16	10	20	49	62	−13	42	
18	RUS	Uralets Nizhniy Tagil	46	13	10	23	45	60	−15	36	
19	RUS	Rubin Kazan	46	10	16	20	48	65	−17	36	
20	AZE	Progress Kirovabad	46	13	7	26	56	96	−40	33	
21	RUS	Dinamo Kirov	46	12	7	27	33	60	−27	31	
22	ARM	Arabkir Yerevan	46	10	11	25	55	101	−46	31	
23	RUS	Druzhba Yoshkar-Ola	46	12	5	29	43	73	−30	29	
24	RUS	Torpedo Togliatti	46	10	8	28	51	88	−37	28	

==== Group 5 ====
Pos	Rep	Team	Pld	W	D	L	GF	GA	GD	Pts	Promotion
1	UZB	Buston Jizak	46	29	11	6	74	35	+39	69	Promoted
2	UZB	Shahrihanets Shahrihan	46	28	7	11	73	39	+34	63	
3	KAZ	Aktyubinets Aktyubinsk	46	24	8	14	79	44	+35	56	
4	UZB	Yangiyer	46	23	9	14	75	54	+21	55	
5	KAZ	Metallurg Chimkent	46	24	6	16	73	50	+23	54	
6	RUS	Stroitel Tyumen	46	22	9	15	59	39	+20	53	
7	UZB	Dinamo Samarkand	46	21	10	15	59	39	+20	52	
8	UZB	Neftyanik Fergana	46	19	11	16	72	50	+22	49	
9	KAZ	Meliorator Kzil-Orda (Note: Orbita Kzil-Orda changed name to Meliorator.)	46	20	8	18	52	60	−8	48	
10	UZB	Horezm Yangiaryk	46	19	8	19	66	72	−6	46	
11	RUS	Metallurg Magnitogorsk	46	17	12	17	51	59	−8	46	
12	UZB	Hiva	46	19	7	20	54	70	−16	45	
13	UZB	KarshiStroi Karshi	46	18	8	20	60	60	0	44	
14	UZB	Zarafshan Navoi	46	17	10	19	51	53	−2	44	
15	UZB	Pahtachi Gulistan	46	17	9	20	53	61	−8	43	
16	UZB	Avtomobilist Termez	46	18	6	22	57	63	−6	42	
17	UZB	Narimanovets Bagat	46	17	8	21	49	64	−15	42	
18	UZB	Amudarya Nukus	46	18	5	23	57	76	−19	41	
19	KAZ	Khimik Jambul	46	16	9	21	53	63	−10	41	
20	RUS	Signal Chelyabinsk	46	16	6	24	51	49	+2	38	
21	TJK	Hojent Leninabad	46	16	6	24	50	70	−20	38	
22	TJK	Pahtakor Kurgan-Tyube	46	15	6	25	46	71	−25	36	
23	UZB	Textilshchik Namangan	46	13	7	26	41	69	−28	33	
24	KAZ	Trud Shevchenko	46	7	12	27	53	98	−45	26	

==== Group 6 ====
Pos	Rep	Team	Pld	W	D	L	GF	GA	GD	Pts	Promotion
1	RUS	SKA Khabarovsk	40	25	9	6	84	37	+47	59	Promoted
2	KAZ	Shakhtyor Karaganda	40	25	8	7	64	31	+33	58	
3	RUS	Luch Vladivostok	40	22	8	10	69	38	+31	52	
4	RUS	Amur Blagoveshchensk	40	22	7	11	53	25	+28	51	
5	KAZ	Spartak Semipalatinsk	40	22	6	12	74	49	+25	50	
6	RUS	Torpedo Rubtsovsk	40	22	6	12	60	43	+17	50	
7	RUS	Dinamo Barnaul	40	19	12	9	65	43	+22	50	
8	RUS	Zvezda Irkutsk	40	20	8	12	73	54	+19	48	
9	KAZ	Tselinnik Tselinograd	40	19	10	11	77	43	+34	48	
10	RUS	Angara Angarsk	40	19	7	14	54	46	+8	45	
11	RUS	Avtomobilist Krasnoyarsk	40	17	8	15	54	47	+7	42	
12	RUS	Irtysh Omsk	40	17	6	17	49	52	−3	40	
13	RUS	Lokomotiv Ulan-Ude	40	16	7	17	50	52	−2	39	
14	RUS	Amur Komsomolsk-na-Amure	40	14	6	20	48	52	−4	34	
15	KAZ	Vostok Ust-Kamenogorsk	40	13	7	20	48	57	−9	33	
16	KAZ	Bulat Temirtau	40	13	6	21	41	66	−25	32	
17	RUS	Manometr Tomsk (Note: Torpedo Tomsk changed name to Manometr.)	40	12	8	20	37	55	−18	32	
18	KAZ	Ugolshchik Ekibastuz	40	9	6	25	31	63	−32	24	
19	RUS	Chkalovets Novosibirsk	40	7	10	23	35	70	−35	24	
20	KAZ	Avangard Petropavlovsk	40	5	7	28	23	83	−60	17	
21	KAZ	Torpedo Kokchetav	40	4	4	32	37	120	−83	12	

Source: rsssf.com

=== Top goalscorers ===
Top League

- Vitaliy Starukhin (Shakhter Donetsk) – 26 goals

First League

- Stepan Yurchyshyn (Karpaty Lvov) – 42 goals

== See also ==
- Football at the 1979 Spartakiad of the Peoples of the USSR
