= Aleksandrs Kulakovs =

Latvian footballer

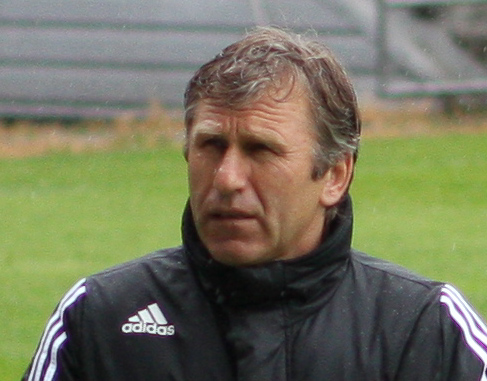

Personal information
- Date of birth: 4 March 1956 (age 70)
- Position: Goalkeeper

Senior career*
Years	Team	Apps	(Gls)
1977–1987	Daugava Rīga	330	(0)
1988	Sport Tallinn	33	(0)
1989	Daugava Rīga	15	(0)
1989	Zveynieks Liepaya	14	(0)
1990	Olimpia Liepaya	27	(0)
1991–1992	Forum-Skonto Riga	16	(0)
1993	RAF Jelgava	7	(0)
1994	Vidus Rīga	15	(0)
Total		457	(0)

International career
1979	Latvia amateur	6	(0)
1992	Latvia	1	(0)
- * Club domestic league appearances and goals

Aleksandrs Kulakovs (born 4 March 1956 in Dedinovo) is a former Latvian football goalkeeper who played for the biggest part of his career for Daugava Rīga.

At the age of 15 Kulakovs was the first goalkeeper for Spartak Lukhovitsy. After having seen him play for the Russian SFSR team, Konstantin Beskov offered Kulakovs to move to the reserves squad for FC Dynamo Moscow. In 1974, he moved to VEF Rīga in Latvia and won the Latvian championship in 1974 and 1975.

In 1976, he moved to Daugava Rīga, the top club in Soviet Latvia which at the time played in the second division of Soviet football. In the first seasons he had to battle for his position on the field with Laimonis Laizāns and Rolands Žagars but soon he became the undisputed number one goalie for Daugava. From 1977 to 1989 he played in 330 matches for Daugava and was succeeded by Oļegs Karavajevs at the club. In 1991, Kulakovs won the Latvian league with Forums Skonto. Kulakovs also played in one international game for Latvia in 1992.

Kulakovs retired from playing and moved to coaching. He currently is the goalkeeping coach for FC Skonto and the Latvia national team.
