= Nodar Akhalkatsi =

Georgian football manager (1938-1998)

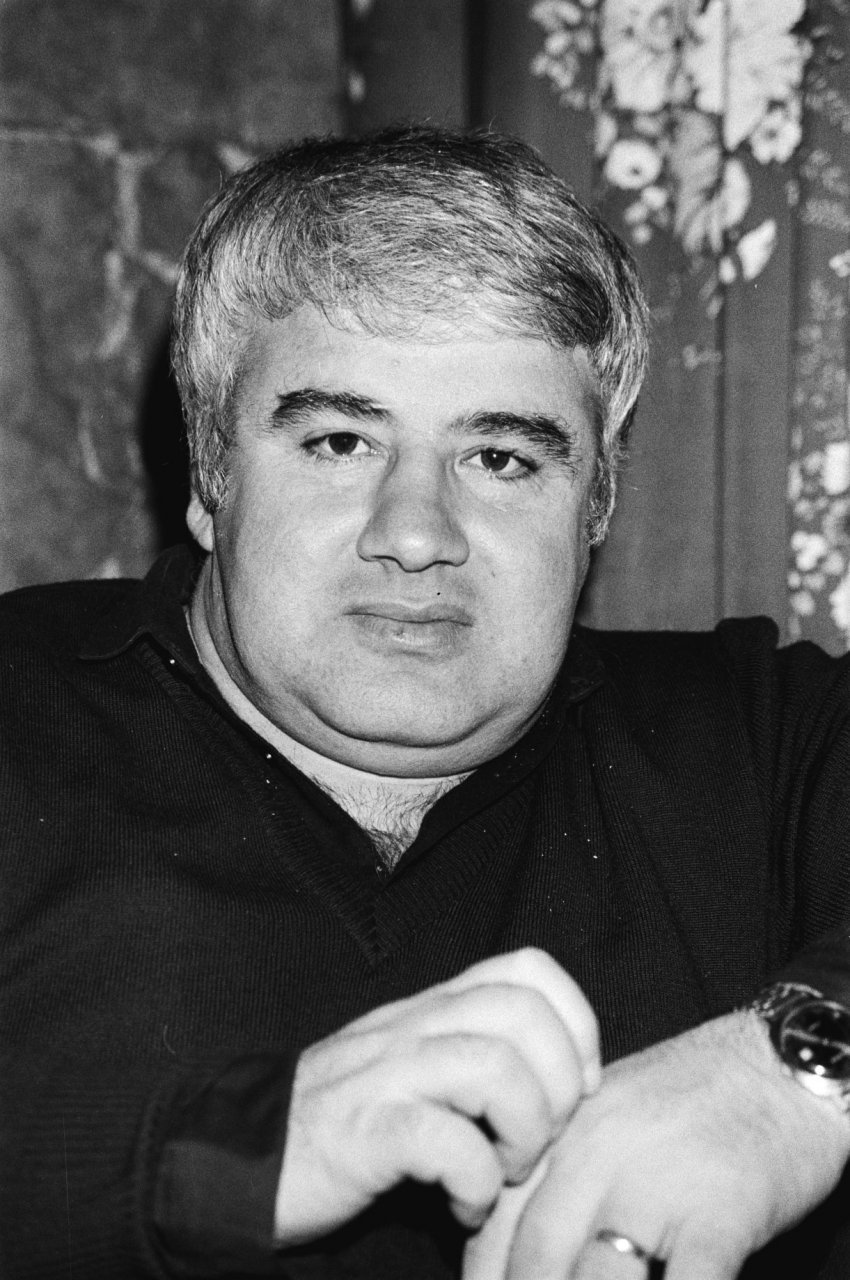

Personal information
- Full name: Nodar Akhalkatsi
- Date of birth: 2 January 1938
- Place of birth: Tbilisi, Georgian SSR
- Date of death: 24 January 1998 (aged 60)
- Place of death: Tbilisi, Georgia
- Height: 1.73 m (5 ft 8 in)
- Position: Striker

Senior career*
Years	Team	Apps	(Gls)
1957–1959	SKA Tbilisi	4	(0)
1960–1966	Lokomotivi Tbilisi	79	(19)
Total		83	(19)

Managerial career
- 1967–1970: Lokomotivi Tbilisi
- 1974–1975: Dinamo Tbilisi (Team chief)
- 1976–1983: Dinamo Tbilisi
- 1981–1982: Soviet Union (Assistant)
- 1985–1986: Dinamo Tbilisi
- * Club domestic league appearances and goals

Nodar Akhalkatsi (Georgian: ნოდარ ახალკაცი; 2 January 1938 – 24 January 1998) was a professional football manager from Georgia.

== Coaching career ==
Akhalkatsi coached Soviet club Dinamo Tbilisi to the USSR league championship in 1978, with a side that contained players such as David Kipiani, Ramaz Shengelia, Vitaly Daraselia, Tengiz Sulakvelidze and Aleksandr Chivadze, all of whom were regular Soviet internationals. The team were renowned for their swashbuckling style of football and attack-minded approach.

The following year, Dinamo entered the European Cup and stunned the reigning champions Liverpool with an impressive 3–0 win in the first round. However, they were eliminated by West German side Hamburg in their next tie.

Two years later, Akhalkatsi enjoyed his finest moment as a manager when he guided Dinamo to victory in the 1981 Cup Winners' Cup final, beating East German outfit Carl Zeiss Jena in Düsseldorf's Rheinstadion. Dinamo had won the 1979 Soviet Cup to gain admittance to the competition, beating FC Dynamo Moscow on penalties in the final.

Akhalkatsi was a member of USSR manager Konstantin Beskov's coaching staff at the 1982 World Cup in Spain, forming a three-man technical team with Beskov and Dynamo Kiev's coach Valeriy Lobanovskyi.

== After retirement ==
In the early 1990s, Akhalkatsi was one of the integral figures in the formation of the Georgian Football Federation after the republic achieved independence from the USSR. He was the organisation's president from 1990 to 1998.

He died of a heart attack on his way to Tbilisi Airport, from where he intended to fly to Moscow to participate in the CIS Cup, on 24 January 1998, aged 60. In 2008, for his contributions to association football, Akhalkatsi became the recipient (posthumously) of the FIFA Order of Merit, the highest honour awarded by FIFA.

His son, Nodar Akhalkatsi junior, was the president of the Georgian Football Federation from June 2005 to September 2009.

== Honours ==
=== Manager ===
Dinamo Tbilisi

- Soviet Top League
  - Winner (1): 1978
  - Runner-up (1): 1977
- Soviet Cup
  - Winner (2): 1976, 1979
  - Runner-up (1): 1980
- UEFA Cup Winners' Cup
  - Winner (1): 1980–81

== Managerial statistics ==
Managerial record by team and tenure
Team	From	To	Record							
Team	From	To	G	W	D	L	GF	GA	GD	Win %
Locomotive Tbilisi	April 1967	November 1970	166	65	41	60	174	152	+22	39.16
Dinamo Tbilisi	March 1976	October 1983	330	160	86	84	495	323	+172	48.48
Dinamo Tbilisi	July 1985	November 1986	53	19	16	18	63	64	−1	35.85
Career totals			549	244	143	162	732	539	+193	44.44

Preceded by unknown	Presidents of GFF; 1990–1998	Succeeded by Merab Jordania
