= Dainis =

Dainis is a masculine Latvian given name. Notable people with the name include:

- Dainis Bremze (born 1954), Latvian luger
- Dainis Deglis (born 1959), Latvian footballer
- Dainis Dukurs (born 1954), Latvian bobsledder
- Dainis Īvāns (born 1955), Latvian journalist and politician
- Dainis Krištopāns (born 1990), Latvian handball player
- Dainis Kūla (born 1959), Latvian javelin thrower
- Dainis Ozols (born 1966), Latvian cyclist
- Dainis Turlais (born 1954), Latvian politician
- Dainis Upelnieks (born 1982), Latvian sports shooter
