= Vyacheslav Leshchuk =

Ukrainian and Soviet footballer

Personal information
- Full name: Vyacheslav Mykhaylovych Leshchuk
- Date of birth: 24 December 1951 (age 74)
- Place of birth: Bilhorod-Dnistrovskyi, Ukrainian SSR
- Positions: Defender; midfielder

Youth career
- DYuSSh Bilhorod-Dnistrovskyi

Senior career*
Years	Team	Apps	(Gls)
1969–1970	FC Chornomorets Odesa	0	(0)
1971–1972	Dynamo Khmelnytskyi		
1973–1983	FC Chornomorets Odesa	313	(16)

International career
1976	USSR	1	(0)
1979	Ukraine		

Managerial career
- 1983–1985: FC Chornomorets Odesa (director)
- 1989–1991: FC Chornomorets Odesa (director)
- 1992–1995: FC Chornomorets Odesa (president)
- * Club domestic league appearances and goals

Vyacheslav Mykhaylovych Leshchuk (Ukrainian: В'ячеслав Михайлович Лещук) (born 24 December 1951 in Bilhorod-Dnistrovskyi) is a retired Ukrainian and Soviet football player. On 13 September 2014 on the Walk of Football Fame of the FC Chornomorets Odesa was held a solemn ceremony of opening of new four "stars". One of them was in honor of Vyacheslav Leshchuk.

== International career ==
Leshchuk played his only game for USSR on 20 March 1976 in a friendly against Argentina.

In 1979 Leshchuk played one game for Ukraine at the Spartakiad of the Peoples of the USSR. He won a bronze medal with the team.
