= Anatoliy Doroshenko =

Soviet and Ukrainian association football player

Personal information
- Date of birth: 14 August 1953 (age 73)
- Place of birth: Savran, Ukrainian SSR, Soviet Union
- Position: Midfielder

Youth career
- 1968–1969: Silhosptekhnika Savran
- 1971–1972: Chornomorets Odesa

Senior career*
Years	Team	Apps	(Gls)
1973–1975	FC Chornomorets Odesa	53	(3)
1976–1977	SKA Odesa	56	(16)
1978	FC Kolos Nikopol	21	(3)
1978–1979	FC Chornomorets Odesa	41	(8)
1982	FC Kryvbas Kryvyi Rih	16	(5)
1988	FC Zirka Kirovohrad	6	(0)
1989	SKA Odesa	4	(0)
1992–1993	FC Enerhiya Illichivsk		
1993–1994	FC ZOR Odesa		
1997–1999	FC Mayak Mayaky		

Managerial career
- 1994–1996: FC Rybak Bilyaivka
- 1996–2001: FC Mayak Mayaky
- 2001–2002: FC Chornomorets-3 Odesa
- 2002–2003: FC Chornomorets-2 Odesa
- * Club domestic league appearances and goals

Anatoliy Hryhorovych Doroshenko (Ukrainian: Анатолій Григорович Дорошенко, romanized: Anatolii Hryhorovych Doroshenko; born 14 August 1953) is an association footballer from the former Ukrainian SSR, Soviet Union who played for FC Chornomorets Odesa. In the USSR championship 1974 he won a bronze medal with the team.

He scored FC Chornomorets Odesa's first ever goal in European competitions.

In 1979 Doroshenko played five matches for Ukrainian Soviet Socialist Republic team at the Spartakiad of the Peoples of the USSR, where he played in the starting line-up four times. He won a bronze medal with the team.

In the voting for "Best Footballer of Odesa of the 20th Century" (2001), Doroshenko took 10th place.

On 14 September 2024, before the match of the 6th round of the 2024–25 Ukrainian Premier League between Chornomorets Odesa and Ingulets Petrove was held a solemn ceremony of opening a new "star" in honor of Anatoliy Doroshenko on the Walk of Football Fame of the FC Chornomorets Odesa.
