= Dainis Deglis =

Latvian footballer

Personal information
- Full name: Dainis Deglis
- Date of birth: 26 January 1959 (age 67)
- Place of birth: Smiltene, Latvian SSR, Soviet Union (now Republic of Latvia)
- Height: 1.81 m (5 ft 11 1/2 in)
- Position: Defender

Team information
- Current team: FK Daugava Rīga (member of the board)

Senior career*
Years	Team	Apps	(Gls)
1978–1979	FK Daugava Rīga	58	(1)
1980–1981	FC Dynamo Moscow	0	(0)
1982–1986	FK Daugava Rīga	199	(3)
1987–1988	Zvejnieks Liepāja	77	(2)
1989	FK Daugava Rīga	42	(1)
1990	FC KooTeePee		
1992	Decemvīri Riga		

International career
1979	Latvia amateur	6	(1)
- * Club domestic league appearances and goals

Dainis Deglis (born 26 January 1959 in Smiltene) is a former Latvian football defender, who was called the Latvian rifleman while he played for FK Daugava Rīga. Currently, he is a member of the board and the main shareholder at the Latvian Higher League club FK Daugava Rīga.

== Playing career ==
Almost his entire senior football career Deglis played for Daugava Rīga, capping more than 350 appearances for the team, quite often being the only Latvian origin player on the field (thus – the Latvian rifleman). Playing with the head was known as his strong side. In 1980–1981 he tried to secure himself a position in FC Dynamo Moscow but after failing to participate in a single match for Dynamo he returned to Riga where under the management of Jānis Skredelis Daugava was climbing out of the hole where it had spent the late Seventies – early Eighties and two consecutive years nearly earned a promotion to the top Soviet league.

Just when the results for Daugava were getting worse again Deglis moved to Zvejnieks Liepāja where he spent the 1987–1988 seasons. In 1989 he again was a player of Daugava, then for one year he played with FC KooTeePee in Finland.
