= Vakhtang Koridze =

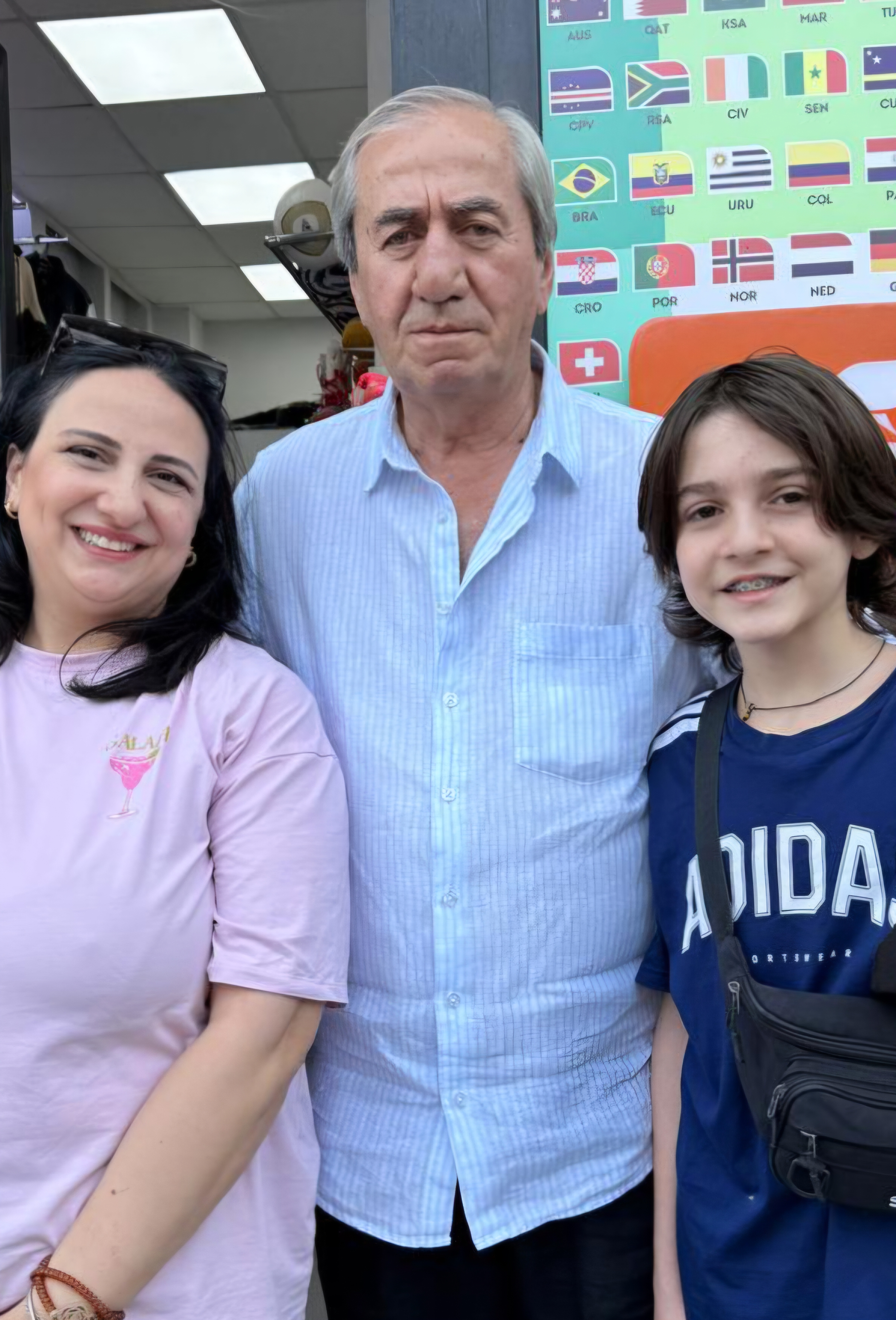

Personal information
- Full name: Vakhtang Ionovich Koridze
- Date of birth: 24 December 1949 (age 76)
- Place of birth: Batumi, Georgian SSR
- Positions: Defender; midfielder

Senior career*
| Years | Team | Apps | (Gls) |
| 1967–1969 | FC Dinamo Batumi | 104 | (6) |
| 1969–1970 | FC Dinamo Tbilisi | 2 | (0) |
| 1971–1974 | FC Dinamo Batumi | | |
| 1975–1980 | FC Dinamo Tbilisi | 143 | (22) |
| 1981 | FC Guria Lanchkhuti | 26 | (3) |

International career
| 1979 | USSR | 4 | (1) |
- * Club domestic league appearances and goals

Vakhtang Ionovich Koridze (Georgian: ვახტანგ ქორიძე) (born 24 December 1949 in Batumi) is a retired Georgian and Soviet football player. He was an integral member of the FC Dinamo Tbilisi side that won the Soviet league championship in 1978 and eliminated Liverpool in the European Cup the following year.

== Career statistics ==
=== Club ===
| Club | Season | League | | Cup | | Europe | | Total | |
| Club | Season | Apps | Goals | Apps | Goals | Apps | Goals | Apps | Goals |
|---|---|---|---|---|---|---|---|---|---|
| Dinamo Tbilisi | 1969 | 1 | 0 | – | – | – | – | 1 | 0 |
| Dinamo Tbilisi | 1970 | 1 | 0 | – | – | – | – | 1 | 0 |
| Dinamo Tbilisi | 1975 | 29 | 4 | 4 | 2 | – | – | 33 | 6 |
| Dinamo Tbilisi | 1976 | 26 | 3 | 4 | 2 | 1 | 0 | 27 | 3 |
| Dinamo Tbilisi | 1977 | 30 | 4 | 1 | 0 | 6 | 0 | 37 | 4 |
| Dinamo Tbilisi | 1978 | 30 | 8 | 6 | 1 | 4 | 0 | 40 | 9 |
| Dinamo Tbilisi | 1979 | 22 | 2 | 6 | 1 | 3 | 0 | 31 | 3 |
| Dinamo Tbilisi | 1980 | 6 | 1 | 5 | 1 | 2 | 0 | 13 | 2 |
| Career | Total | 145 | 22 | 26 | 7 | 16 | 0 | 187 | 29 |

== Honours ==
- Soviet Top League winner: 1978
- Soviet Cup (2): 1976, 1979

== International career ==
Koridze made his debut for USSR on 28 March 1979 in a friendly against Bulgaria. He played in a UEFA Euro 1980 qualifier against Hungary and scored a goal in a friendly against Czechoslovakia.
