= Oļegs Karavajevs =

Latvian footballer (1961–2020)

Personal information
- Date of birth: 13 February 1961
- Place of birth: Barnaul, Russian SFSR, Soviet Union
- Date of death: 6 October 2020 (aged 59)
- Place of death: Germany
- Height: 1.86 m (6 ft 1 in)
- Position: Goalkeeper

Senior career*
Years	Team	Apps	(Gls)
1979–1980	Alga Frunze	18	(0)
1981	Pakhtakor Tashkent	0	(0)
1982–1983	Alga Frunze	30	(0)
1984	Kairat Almaty	2	(0)
1985–1986	SKA Khabarovsk	88	(0)
1987–1988	Daugava Rīga	69	(0)
1989–1990	Fakel Voronezh	80	(0)
1990–1992	OFK Belgrade	29	(0)
1993	Olimpija Rīga	2	(0)
1993–1994	Evagoras Paphos	0	(0)
1994–1995	Carl Zeiss Jena	16	(0)
1995–1998	FSV Zwickau	74	(0)
1998	Skonto Rīga	9	(0)
1999	FK Rīga	22	(0)
Total		499	(0)

International career
1992–1999	Latvia	38	(0)
- * Club domestic league appearances and goals

Oļegs Karavajevs (13 February 1961 – 6 October 2020) was a Latvian professional footballer who played as a goalkeeper. He was the goalkeeper who made the most appearances for the Latvia national team during the 1990s.

== Club career ==
Born in Barnaul, Karavajevs' first club was Alga Frunze in Kyrgyzstan (at that time still within the Soviet Union) with which Karavajevs played 18 matches in 1979. Karavajevs stayed with Frunze until 1984, except for a brief time with Pakhtakor Tashkent in 1981. Then came a season with Kairat Almaty but Karavajevs became a real Soviet First League goalkeeper in 1985 when he transferred to SKA Khabarovsk. With SKA he played 88 matches over two seasons and was invited to transfer to Daugava Rīga where he took over the number one goalkeeper position from Aleksandrs Kulakovs.

In 1987 Daugava with Karavajevs as an irreplaceable goalkeeper nearly earned promotion to the Soviet top league but in 1988 the performance of the club started to decline and Karavajevs had to battle for his position with Valeri Shantalosov.

In 1988 Karavajevs left Daugava for Fakel Voronezh. For two seasons he was the top goalkeeper of Fakel but then he went abroad and joined the Serbian club OFK Belgrade, playing back then in the Yugoslav First League. While playing in Yugoslavia, his name was spelled and referred to as Oleg Karavajev. He came to Belgrade in the summer of 1990 having played the second half of the 1990–91 season back with Fakel. The next summer he returned and stayed with OFK until the winter break of the 1992–93 season (already playing in the First League of FR Yugoslavia) when he returned to Latvia and played with Olimpija Rīga.

With his next move, Karavajevs, came to Cyprus where he played for Evagoras Paphos in 1993–94. From there his steps led to Carl Zeiss Jena and FSV Zwickau in Germany.

For the 1998 season Karavajevs went to Latvia as he joined the champion club Skonto FC where he played together with Aleksandrs Koliņko who eventually would replace Karavajevs as the main goalkeeper for the Latvia national team. In 1999 Karavajevs joined the newly founded FK Rīga with which he won the Latvian Cup and retired after the season.

== International career ==
In total from 1992 to 1999 Karavajevs played 38 matches for the Latvia national team. He was never a 100% first goalkeeper for Latvia, as he had a very strong opponent in the person of Raimonds Laizāns who played for Skonto FC – the base club for the Latvia national team during the 1990s. Still Karavajevs played slightly more for Latvia – he beat Laizāns by seven matches but Karavajevs also usually played in the more important matches. Karavajevs played in several historic matches for Latvia – when they managed to hold draws against the Euro 1992 winners Denmark and one of the strongest European national teams Spain. He played his last two matches for Latvia in 1999 in two goalless draws against Greece and Albania.

== Death ==
Karavajevs died on 6 October 2020 in Germany, aged 59.
