= Vladimir Oreshin =

Personal information
- Full name: Vladimir Maksimovich Oreshin
- Date of birth: 21 February 1951 (age 75)
- Place of birth: Osh, Kyrgyzstan SSR
- Height: 1.62 m (5 ft 4 in)
- Position: Midfielder

Senior career*
Years	Team	Apps	(Gls)
1968–1983	Alga Frunze		
1969–1971	→ Alay Osh (loan)		
1985–1986	Alay Osh	54	(15)
1992–1994	Ak-Maral Tokmok	61	(25)
1995–1997	AiK Bishkek	49	(4)
- * Club domestic league appearances and goals

Vladimir Oreshin (Russian: ир Максимович Орешин; born 21 February 1951) is an association football midfielder who played for Soviet club Alga Frunze throughout the 1960s, 1970s and 1980s.

== Career ==
Born in Osh, Oreshin moved to Frunze to play football with Soviet First League side FC Alga Frunze at age 15. Oreshin played professionally for Alga, spending seven seasons in the Soviet First League with the club before announcing his retirement in 1987. Oreshin also played for the Soviet Union's national youth team.

Following the dissolution of the Soviet Union, Oreshin played for local clubs in the Kyrgyzstan League until he retired a final time at age 47. As of September 1997, he had scored more goals in the Soviet and Kyrgyzstan leagues than any other footballer from Kyrgyzstan.
