= Viktor Samokhin =

Soviet Russian footballer and coach (1956–2022)

Personal information
- Full name: Viktor Sergeyevich Samokhin
- Date of birth: 24 January 1956
- Place of birth: Moscow, Russian SFSR, USSR
- Date of death: 13 May 2022 (aged 66)
- Height: 1.87 m (6 ft 2 in)
- Position: Defender

Senior career*
Years	Team	Apps	(Gls)
1974–1981	Spartak Moscow	188	(3)
1982–1985	CSKA Moscow	112	(5)
1986	CSKA-2 Moscow	12	(0)
1992	Sokol Saratov	23	(0)
1993	TRASKO Moscow	4	(0)

International career
1979	USSR	1	(0)

Managerial career
- 1992–1995: FC Sokol-PZhD Saratov (assistant)
- 1996–2002: Spartak Moscow (assistant)
- 2004: FC Spartak Shchyolkovo (assistant)
- 2005: FC Spartak Shchyolkovo
- 2007: FC Lukhovitsy
- 2010: FC Zvezda Serpukhov
- * Club domestic league appearances and goals

Viktor Sergeyevich Samokhin (Russian: Ви́ктор Серге́евич Самохин; 24 January 1956 – 13 May 2022) was a Soviet and Russian football player and coach.

== International career ==
Samokhin played his only game for USSR on November 21, 1979 in a friendly against West Germany.

== Honours ==
Spartak Moscow

- Soviet Top League: 1979
