= Valdas Kasparavičius =

Lithuanian footballer

Personal information
- Full name: Valdas Kasparavičius
- Date of birth: 17 January 1958 (age 68)
- Place of birth: Kapsukas, Lithuanian SSR
- Height: 1.88 m (6 ft 2 in)
- Position: Defender

Senior career*
Years	Team	Apps	(Gls)
1976	Atlantas	4	(0)
1976	Žalgiris Vilnius	1	(0)
1977	Atlantas	39	(1)
1978	Žalgiris Vilnius	32	(2)
1979	Odesa	44	(2)
1980–1986	Žalgiris Vilnius	231	(17)
1986	Elektrometalurh-NZF Nikopol	7	(1)
1987–1989	Atlantas	77	(9)
1989–1990	Jagiellonia Białystok	15	(0)
1990–1991	VfB 06/08 Remscheid		
1991–1992	VfL Gevelsberg	11	(0)

International career
1984	Soviet Union U21	1	(0)
- * Club domestic league appearances and goals

Valdas Kasparavičius (born 17 January 1958 in Kapsukas) is a Lithuanian former professional footballer who played as a defender.

Kasparavičius was elected Lithuanian Footballer of the Year in 1983.
