= Seilda Baishakov =

Kazakh footballer (1950–2023)

Personal information
- Full name: Seilda Ikramovich Baishakov
- Date of birth: 28 August 1950
- Place of birth: USSR
- Date of death: 12 July 2023 (aged 72)
- Position: Defender

Senior career*
Years	Team	Apps	(Gls)
1970	Energetik Dzhambul		
1971–1981	FC Kairat	296	(11)

International career
1977	USSR	2	(0)

Managerial career
- 1982–1988: FC Kairat (assistant)
- * Club domestic league appearances and goals

Seilda Ikramovich Baishakov (Russian: Сеильда Икрамович Байшаков; 28 August 1950 – 12 July 2023) was a Kazakh professional footballer who played as a defender. Baishakov played seven seasons in the Soviet Top League and made nearly 300 league appearances for FC Kairat during his career. He made two appearances for the USSR national team.

== International career ==
Baishakov made his debut for USSR on 30 April 1977 in a 1978 FIFA World Cup qualifier against Hungary.

== Managerial career ==
Baishakov managed FC Kairat.

== Death ==
Baishakov died on 12 July 2023, at the age of 72.
