= Yevgeni Sidorov =

Soviet and Russian footballer and manager

Personal information
- Full name: Yevgeni Vasilyevich Sidorov
- Date of birth: 3 May 1956 (age 70)
- Place of birth: Moscow, Russian SFSR
- Height: 1.67 m (5 ft 6 in)
- Position: Midfielder

Senior career*
| Years | Team | Apps | (Gls) |
| 1974–1981 | FC Spartak Moscow | 141 | (10) |
| 1982–1983 | FC SKA Rostov-on-Don | 60 | (12) |
| 1984–1985 | FC Spartak Moscow | 50 | (8) |
| 1986 | FC SKA Roston-on-Don | 40 | (1) |
| 1987–1991 | FC Geolog Tyumen | 180 | (31) |
| 1992 | FC APK Azov | 15 | (1) |
| 1992 | FC SKA Rostov-on-Don | 9 | (0) |
| 1994 | FC Irtysh Tobolsk | 15 | (6) |

International career
| 1980 | USSR | 1 | (0) |

Managerial career
- 1994: FC Irtysh Tobolsk (assistant)
- 1998–1999: FC Tyumen (assistant)
- 2000–2001: FC Spartak Shchyolkovo
- 2002: FC Pskov-2000 Pskov
- * Club domestic league appearances and goals

Yevgeni Vasilyevich Sidorov (Russian: Евгений Васильевич Сидоров; born 3 May 1956) is a retired Soviet and Russian football player and a current manager.

== Honours ==
- Soviet Top League winner: 1979.
- Soviet Top League runner-up: 1980, 1981, 1984, 1985.

== International career ==
Sidorov played his only game for USSR on 26 March 1980 in a friendly against Bulgaria.
