= Vladimir Fyodorov (footballer) =

Soviet footballer

Personal information
- Full name: Vladimir Ivanovich Fyodorov
- Date of birth: 5 January 1956
- Place of birth: Ortasaray, Tashkent Region, Uzbek SSR
- Date of death: 11 August 1979 (aged 23)
- Place of death: Dniprodzerzhynsk, Ukrainian SSR
- Height: 1.71 m (5 ft 7 in)
- Position: Striker

Youth career
- Kolkhoz im. Sverdlova Tashkent

Senior career*
Years	Team	Apps	(Gls)
1972–1979	Pakhtakor Tashkent	187	(58)

International career
1974–1978	USSR	18	(0)
Medal record
Representing Soviet Union
Men's Football
Bronze medal – third place	1976 Montreal	Team competition
- * Club domestic league appearances and goals

Vladimir Ivanovich Fyodorov (Russian: Владимир Иванович Фёдоров; 5 January 1956 – 11 August 1979) was a Soviet football player. Fyodorov was one of the 17 FC Pakhtakor Tashkent members killed in the 1979 Dniprodzerzhynsk mid-air collision.

== Honours ==
- Olympic bronze: 1976

== International career ==
Fyodorov made his debut for the USSR on October 30, 1974 in a UEFA Euro 1976 qualifier against Ireland. He also played in 1978 FIFA World Cup qualifiers (the USSR did not qualify for the final tournament in either of those).
