= Revaz Chelebadze =

Georgian footballer

Personal information
- Date of birth: 2 October 1955 (age 71)
- Place of birth: Kobuleti, Soviet Union (now Georgia)
- Position: Striker

Senior career*
Years	Team	Apps	(Gls)
1976–1982	Dinamo Tbilisi	122	(41)
1982	Guria Lanchkhuti	11	(6)
1983–1985	Dinamo Batumi	78	(53)
1985–1987	Dinamo Tbilisi	37	(11)

International career
1977–1980	Soviet Union	7	(3)
- * Club domestic league appearances and goals

Olympic medal record

Representing Soviet Union

Men's Football
Bronze medal – third place	1980 Moscow	Team competition

Revaz Chelebadze (Georgian: რევაზ ჩელებაძე; born 2 October 1955) is a Georgian retired footballer who played as a striker. He was nicknamed Chele (an allusion to Pelé), for his brilliant technical play and ability to score goals. The stadium in his hometown of Kobuleti is named Chele Arena.

== International career ==
Chelebadze made his debut for USSR on 7 September 1977 in a friendly against Poland.

== Honours ==
- Soviet Top League winner: 1978.
- Soviet Cup winner: 1976, 1979.
- Olympic bronze: 1980.
