= Latvia national amateur football team =

Latvia
- Association: Latvijas Futbola federācija (LFF)
- Confederation: UEFA
- Head coach: Ervīns Pērkons
- Captain: Reinis Niks Brenards
- Most caps: Many players (3)
- Top scorer: Daniels Lērme, Dāniels Ričards Geidāns (1)
- Home stadium: LNK Sporta Parks, BSS Stadium

First international
- Latvia 0-0 Ialoveni District (Riga, Latvia; 24 August 2022)

Biggest win
- (none)

Biggest defeat
- Latvia 0–5 Western Slovakia (Riga, Latvia; 27 August 2022); Lower Silesian Football Association 5-0 Latvia (Riga, Latvia, 30 August 2022)

Regions' Cup
- Appearances: 2 (first in 2023)
- Best result: Intermediate round (2023, 2025)

Spartakiad of the Peoples of the USSR
- Appearances: 1 (first in 1979)
- Best result: Qualification groups (1979)

The Latvia national amateur football team represents Latvia in the UEFA Regions' Cup in men's international football, and is controlled by the Latvian Football Federation, the governing body for football in Latvia. They have represented Latvia in the 2023 and 2025 editions of the UEFA Regions' Cup, where its players are selected from the tier 3 Latvian Second League and tier 4 Latvian Third League Latvian leagues. The team has yet to reach the Final 8 main phase of the Regions' Cup.

Latvia had previously been represented in the tournament by the winning clubs of Latvia's tier 3 Latvian Second League, for instance by FC Caramba in the 2017 edition, and by FC Noah Jurmala in the 2019 edition.

== Results and fixtures ==
24 August 2022 2023 UEFA Regions' Cup	Latvia	0–0	(Moldova) Ialoveni	LNK Sporta Parks, Riga
19:00 UTC+3		Report		Attendance: 30; Referee: Nenad Minakovic (Serbia)

27 August 2022 2023 UEFA Regions' Cup	Latvia	0–5	West Slovakia	LNK Sporta Parks, Riga
09:00 UTC+3		Report	Holíček 3' (pen.); Matuškovič 10'; Molnár 21'; Janek 76'; Londák 79'	Attendance: 40; Referee: Oleksii Derevinskyi (Ukraine)

30 August 2022 2023 UEFA Regions' Cup	Lower Silesia (Poland)	5–0	Latvia	BSS Stadium, Salaspils
18:00 UTC+3	Moseičenko 53' (o.g.); Bońkowski 80'; Wojciechowski 81, 90+2'; Sadowski 89'	Report		Attendance: 30; Referee: Nenad Minakovic (Serbia)

31 July 2024 2025 UEFA Regions' Cup	Länsi-Vantaan Ylpeys (Finland)	5–1	Latvia	Myyrmäen jalkapallostadion, Vantaa
17:30 UTC+3	Rahkola 19'; Partanen 23'; Nyholm 25'; Nurmi 39'; Jmaali 80'	Report	Lērme 48'	Referee: Zaven Hovhannisyan (Armenia)

3 August 2024 2025 UEFA Regions' Cup	Lisbon (Portugal)	3–0	Latvia	Myyrmäen jalkapallostadion, Vantaa
11:00 UTC+3	Botas 13'; Kiala 22'; Job 86'	Report		Referee: Zaven Hovhannisyan (Armenia)

6 August 2024 2025 UEFA Regions' Cup	Latvia	1–2	(England) Arthurian League	Myyrmäen jalkapallostadion, Vantaa
11:00 UTC+3	Geidāns 43'	Report	Bonnar 15'; Thomas 59'	Referee: Volen Chinkov (Bulgaria)

== Players ==
=== Current squad ===
The following players were called up for the 2025 UEFA Regions' Cup matches against Länsi-Vantaan Ylpeys, Lisbon Football Association, and Arthurian League on 31 July, 3 August, and 6 August 2024.

No.	Pos.	Player	Date of birth (age)	Caps	Goals	Club
1	GK	Patriks Punnenovs	17 July 2003 (age 22)	{{{caps}}}	0	(Latvian Football Federation) FK Aliance
12	GK	Niks Iesalnieks	1 October 2003 (age 22)	{{{caps}}}	0	(Latvian Football Federation) FK Sigulda
2	DF	Matīss Baškevics	31 January 2003 (age 23)	{{{caps}}}	0	(Latvian Football Federation) JFC Viola
6	DF	Reinis Niks Brenards (captain)	25 February 2003 (age 23)	{{{caps}}}	0	(Latvian Football Federation) FK Aliance
7	DF	Emīls Draška	{{{age}}}	{{{caps}}}	0	(Latvian Football Federation)
10	DF	Ralfs Apsītis	23 October 1995 (age 30)	{{{caps}}}	0	(Latvian Football Federation) FC Gauja
14	DF	Daniels Lērme	27 October 2003 (age 22)	{{{caps}}}	1	(Latvian Football Federation) FC Gauja
18	DF	Daniels Viesturs Melbārdis	6 August 2003 (age 22)	{{{caps}}}	0	(Latvian Football Federation) Riga Stradiņš University
20	DF	Artis Ķempelis	4 December 2003 (age 22)	{{{caps}}}	0	(Latvian Football Federation) Futbola Parks Academy
4	MF	Edžus Samharadze	27 September 1999 (age 26)	{{{caps}}}	0	(Latvian Football Federation) SK Kengaroos
5	MF	Toms Cinglers	29 August 1994 (age 31)	{{{caps}}}	0	(Latvian Football Federation) Balvu Sporta centrs
8	MF	Aleksejs Krasivorons	27 February 2003 (age 23)	{{{caps}}}	0	(Latvian Football Federation) FK Salaspils
9	MF	Kristaps Kančs	16 March 2004 (age 22)	{{{caps}}}	0	(Latvian Football Federation) Talsu futbols
13	MF	Rihards Kuzņecovs	12 March 2003 (age 23)	{{{caps}}}	0	(Latvian Football Federation) FK Aliance
15	MF	Ģirts Vaskis	25 May 1999 (age 27)	{{{caps}}}	0	(Latvian Football Federation) Balvu Sporta centrs
16	MF	Kārlis Zernis	19 December 1992 (age 33)	{{{caps}}}	0	(Latvian Football Federation) FK Aliance
19	MF	Dāniels Ričards Geidāns	10 March 2005 (age 21)	{{{caps}}}	1	(Latvian Football Federation) Babīte SK
11	FW	Markuss Mārtiņš Stabulnieks	2 April 2003 (age 23)	{{{caps}}}	0	(Latvian Football Federation) Madonas BJSS

No players who were on the Latvian team in the 2023 UEFA Regions' Cup were brought back for the 2025 edition.

== Latvian SSR senior football team ==
An amateur team representing the Latvian Soviet Socialist Republic entered the football tournament at the 1979 Spartakiad of the Peoples of the USSR while Latvia was annexed by the Soviet Union. The team recorded 1 win (against the Armenian SSR team) and 5 losses, and ended 15th out of the 16 teams, only above the Kirghiz Soviet Socialist Republic team.

Only junior teams were allowed in the 1983 Spartakiad onwards. As such, the Latvian SSR's senior team never played again.
