= Vitaly Razdayev =

Soviet footballer

Vitaly Aleksandrovich Razdayev (Russian: Виталий Александрович Раздаев; born 13 October 1946, Anzhero-Sudzhensk, Kemerovo Oblast) is a Soviet football player. Master of Sports of the Soviet Union (1979). The best scorer of the Soviet First League in the history (216 goals in 555 matches).

From 1969 to 1988 he played for FC Kuzbass Kemerovo.
