= Nugzar Kakilashvili =

Georgian and Soviet footballer

Personal information
- Full name: Nugzar Kakilashvili
- Date of birth: 28 May 1960 (age 66)
- Place of birth: Tbilisi, Georgian SSR
- Height: 1.77 m (5 ft 10 in)
- Position: Attacking midfielder

Senior career*
| Years | Team | Apps | (Gls) |
| 1977−1987 | Dinamo Tbilisi | 198 | (21) |
| 1988 | Guria Lanchkhuti | 20 | (0) |
| 1989 | Dinamo Batumi | 24 | (3) |
| 1990 | Shevardeni Tbilisi | 12 | (0) |

International career
| 1981−1982 | USSR 21 | 4 | (1) |
- * Club domestic league appearances and goals

Nugzar (Nukri) Kakilashvili (Georgian: ნუგზარ (ნუკრი) კაკილაშვილი) (born 28 May 1960 in Tbilisi) is a retired Georgian and Soviet football player.

He participated in 1981 European Cup Winners' Cup Final, in which Dinamo Tbilisi won its first and only continental title.

== Honours ==
- Soviet Top League winner: 1978.
- Soviet Cup winner: 1979.
- UEFA Cup Winners' Cup winner: 1981.
