= Myroslav Stupar =

Ukrainian footballer and referee (born 1941)

Personal information
- Full name: Myroslav Ivanovych Stupar
- Date of birth: 27 August 1941 (age 85)
- Place of birth: Stanislav, Ukrainian SSR, Soviet Union
- Position: Goalkeeper

Senior career*
Years	Team	Apps	(Gls)
1958–1961	Spartak Stanislav		
1962–1963	Volyn Lutsk		
1964–1965	Dynamo Khmelnytskyi		
1966–1969	Spartak Ivano-Frankivsk		
- * Club domestic league appearances and goals

Myroslav Stupar
Domestic
Years	League	Role
1973–1991	Soviet Top League	Referee

International
Years	League	Role
1977–1982	FIFA listed	Referee

Myroslav Ivanovych Stupar (Ukrainian: Мирослав Іванович Ступар; Russian: Мирослав Иванович Ступар; born August 27, 1941) is a Ukrainian retired footballer and football referee.

== Career ==
As a player, he was a goalkeeper and played for Spartak Stanislav / Ivano-Frankivsk, FC Volyn Lutsk, Dinamo Khmelnytskyi, also for the FC Dynamo Kyiv reserves.

As a referee he officiated at about 150 matches of the Soviet Top League. Stupar twice refereed Soviet Cup finals (1979, 1981). He appeared 7 times in the Soviet annual best referees list.

He refereed the 1982 World Cup game in Valladolid, Spain, between France and Kuwait. France were leading 3-1 when their midfielder Alain Giresse broke through to score a fourth goal. The Kuwaiti players protested, claiming that they had stopped playing because they had heard a whistle from the crowd and thought it was the referee blowing. Stupar ended up disallowing Giresse's goal after an attempt to abandon the game led by the Kuwait Olympic Committee president Fahad Al-Ahmed Al-Jaber Al-Sabah, who was also the president of the Olympic Council of Asia. The game resumed with a dropped-ball at the spot where it was believed the game stopped at the whistle. France ended up winning 4–1 anyway, and Stupar never officiated an international match again.
