= Stepan Yurchyshyn =

Ukrainian Soviet footballer (1957–2025)

Personal information
- Full name: Stepan Fedorovych Yurchyshyn
- Date of birth: 28 August 1957
- Place of birth: Kernytsia, Ukrainian SSR, USSR (now Ukraine)
- Date of death: 10 July 2025 (aged 67)
- Place of death: Lviv, Ukraine
- Height: 1.76 m (5 ft 9 in)
- Positions: Striker; midfielder

Youth career
- SKA Lviv

Senior career*
Years	Team	Apps	(Gls)
1974	SC Lutsk	0	(0)
1976–1977	SC Lutsk / SKA Lviv	54	(9)
1977	CSKA Moscow	8	(1)
1979–1980	Karpaty Lviv	85	(59)
1981	Dynamo Kyiv	1	(0)
1981	Karpaty Lviv	28	(5)
1982–1983	SKA Karpaty Lviv	44	(10)
1984	Pakhtakor Tashkent	27	(2)
1986	Torpedo Lutsk	35	(7)
1987–1988	Podillya Khmelnytskyi	97	(12)
1989–1990	Karpaty Lviv	73	(19)
1991	Hazovyk Komarno		
1992–1994	Sokil-LORTA Lviv		

International career
1979	Ukrainian SSR		
1979	USSR	4	(1)

Managerial career
- 1991–1992: Karpaty Lviv
- 1992: Hazovyk Komarno
- 1994–1998: Lviv
- 1999: Karpaty Lviv
- 2001: Karpaty Lviv
- 2003–2004: Karpaty-2 Lviv
- 2007–2008: Lviv
- 2009–2011: Karpaty Lviv (sports director)
- 2012: Karpaty Lviv (assistant)
- * Club domestic league appearances and goals

Stepan Fedorovych Yurchyshyn (Ukrainian: Степан Федорович Юрчишин; 28 August 1957 – 10 July 2025) was a Ukrainian football player and manager.

== Career ==
Native of Lviv, Yurchyshyn started his football career in a football academy of the Carpathian Military District army sports club (SKA Lviv), which for most of the time was centered in Lviv. For a short period, the first team of SKA Lviv represented the city of Lutsk in the neighboring Volyn Oblast. In 1977, the 19-year-old Yurchyshyn was called to the Central Army Sports Club in Moscow, CSKA Moscow.

== International career ==
Yurchyshyn made his debut for USSR on 5 September 1979 in a friendly against East Germany. He played in UEFA Euro 1980 qualifiers (USSR did not qualify for the final tournament).

In 1979 Yurchyshyn played a couple of games for Ukraine at the Spartakiad of the Peoples of the USSR.

== Managerial career ==
The first team Yurchyshyn coached was Karpaty Lviv in 1990, 1992, and then from 1999 to 2006. In 2007, he became a coach of FC Lviv from which he resigned in late September 2008 after the club's poor start in the Ukrainian Premier League.

== Death ==
Yurchyshyn died on 10 July 2025, at the age of 67.

== Coaching statistics ==
Season Division	Club	Record W-D-L	Goals GF–GA	Standing	Notes
1992; Division 1	Karpaty	5-6-7	15-18	6/10	replaced by Myron Markevych
1992/93; Division 3	Hazovyk	13-8-13	37-47	7/18	
2007/08; Division 2	Lviv	23-5-10	58-29	2/20	Promotion to premiers
2008/09; Division 1	Lviv	1-2-6	3-10	15/16	replaced by Roman Laba

== Honours ==
- Soviet Top League: 1981
