= Vakhtang Kopaleishvili =

Personal information
- Full name: Vakhtang Kopaleishvili
- Date of birth: 26 December 1954
- Place of birth: Samtredia, Georgian SSR
- Date of death: 13 February 2015 (aged 60)
- Place of death: Tbilisi, Georgia
- Position: Attacking midfielder

Youth career
- 1973−1974: Dinamo Tbilisi

Senior career*
Years	Team	Apps	(Gls)
1975−1980	Dinamo Tbilisi	73	(1)
1980−1982	Guria Lanchkhuti	101	(26)
1983	Dinamo Tbilisi	11	(1)
1984−1987	Guria Lanchkhuti	125	(37)

Managerial career
- 1996−1999: Georgia U18
- 1997−1998: Georgia U17
- * Club domestic league appearances and goals

Vakhtang Kopaleishvili (Georgian: ვახტანგ კოპალეიშვილი) (born 26 December 1954 in Samtredia - died 13 February 2015 in Tbilisi) was a Georgian and Soviet football player and manager.

Kopaleishvili played for Dinamo Tbilisi and Guria Lanchkhuti during his career.

After retirement, Kopaleishvili took charge of Georgia national under-18 football team, which qualified for 1999 UEFA European Under-18 Championship under his management.

Kopaleishvili died in 2015.

== Honours ==
- Soviet Top League winner: 1978
- Soviet Cup winner: 1976, 1979
