= Vitaly Daraselia =

Georgian footballer

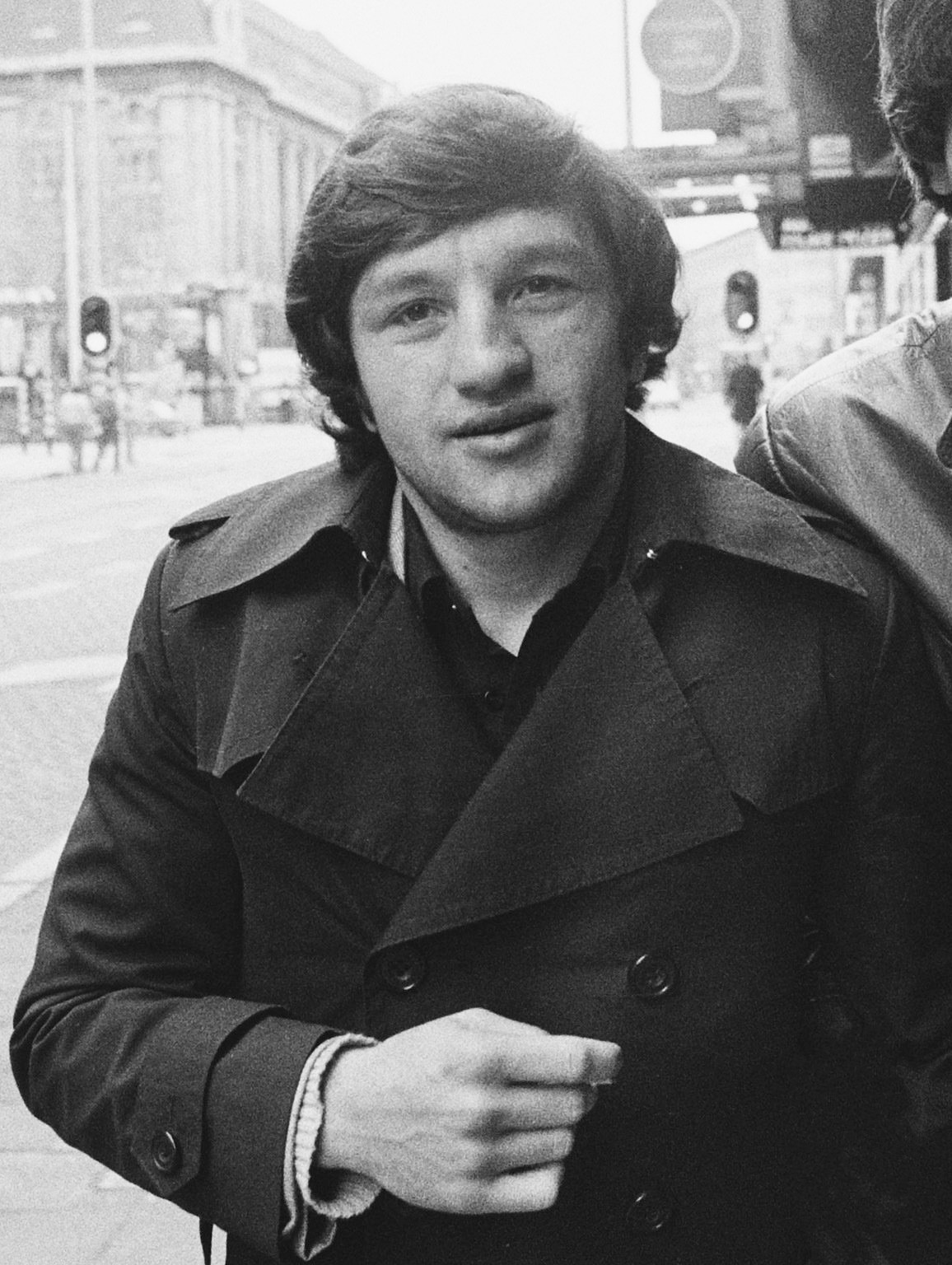
- Daraselia in the Netherlands in 1981

Personal information
- Full name: Vitaly Kukhinovich Daraselia
- Date of birth: 9 January 1957
- Place of birth: Ochamchire, Abkhaz ASSR, Georgian SSR, Soviet Union
- Date of death: 13 December 1982 (aged 25)
- Place of death: Zestaponi, Georgian SSR, Soviet Union
- Height: 1.72 m (5 ft 8 in)
- Position: Midfielder

Senior career*
Years	Team	Apps	(Gls)
1974	Amirani Ochamchire		
1975–1982	FC Dinamo Tbilisi	192	(26)

International career
1978–1982	USSR	22	(3)
- * Club domestic league appearances and goals

Vitaly Kukhinovich Daraselia (Georgian: ვიტალი დარასელია; Abkhaz: Витали Кәыхьын-иԥа Дараселиа; 9 January 1957 – 13 December 1982) was a Soviet football player.

== Playing career ==
=== Club ===
Daraselia was born to a Georgian father and Abkhaz mother on 9 January 1957. His birth date was later changed by Soviet sports officials to 9 October 1957 so that he could play longer for the national junior team. Daraselia also played for FC Dinamo Tbilisi and Soviet Union senior national team. He scored a winning goal for FC Dinamo Tbilisi in 1981, in the final game of the UEFA Cup Winners' Cup, rushing into the penalty area past two defenders, just 3 minutes before the full-time whistle.

=== International ===
In 1982 he played his only World Cup.

== Personal life ==
His son, Vitaly Daraselia Jr. (born 1978), also played internationally as an association football midfielder, while his daughter Christina became a football official. In September 1978, when FC Dinamo Tbilisi was going to play against SSC Napoli in Italy, Vitaly's wife was expecting their second child. Before the game Daraselia told his teammates, that he would name his son after the one who would score the goal. Vitaly scored himself.

=== Death ===
Daraselia died in a traffic accident on 13 December 1982 when his car plunged from a mountain cliff into a river. His body was carried away by the river and was completely buried in sand. It was found 13 days later using a search and rescue dog.

== Legacy ==
The stadium in Daraselia's home town of Ochamchire in Georgia bears his name. In December 2009, Daraselia's mother reported that the footballer's house-museum in Ochamchire was plundered and burned down.
