= Shota Khinchagashvili =

Soviet footballer

Personal information
- Full name: Shota Yuriyevich Khinchagashvili
- Date of birth: 9 January 1951 (age 75)
- Place of birth: Dusheti, USSR
- Height: 1.83 m (6 ft 0 in)
- Position: Defender

Senior career*
Years	Team	Apps	(Gls)
1968–1969	Metallurg Rustavi		
1970–1982	FC Dinamo Tbilisi	143	(0)

International career
1976–1979	USSR	11	(0)

Managerial career
- 1984: FC Dinamo Tbilisi (assistant)
- 1986: FC Dinamo Tbilisi (director)
- * Club domestic league appearances and goals

Shota Yuriyevich Khinchagashvili (Georgian: შოთა ხინჩაგაშვილი; born 9 January 1951 in Dusheti) is a retired Georgian football player.

== Honours ==
- Soviet Top League winner: 1978.
- Soviet Cup winner: 1976, 1979.
- UEFA Cup Winners' Cup winner: 1981.

== International career ==
Khinchagashvili made his debut for USSR on 28 November 1976 in a friendly against Argentina. He played in 1978 FIFA World Cup and UEFA Euro 1980 qualifiers (USSR did not qualify for the final tournament for either).
