= Aleksandre Chivadze =

Georgian footballer (born 1955)

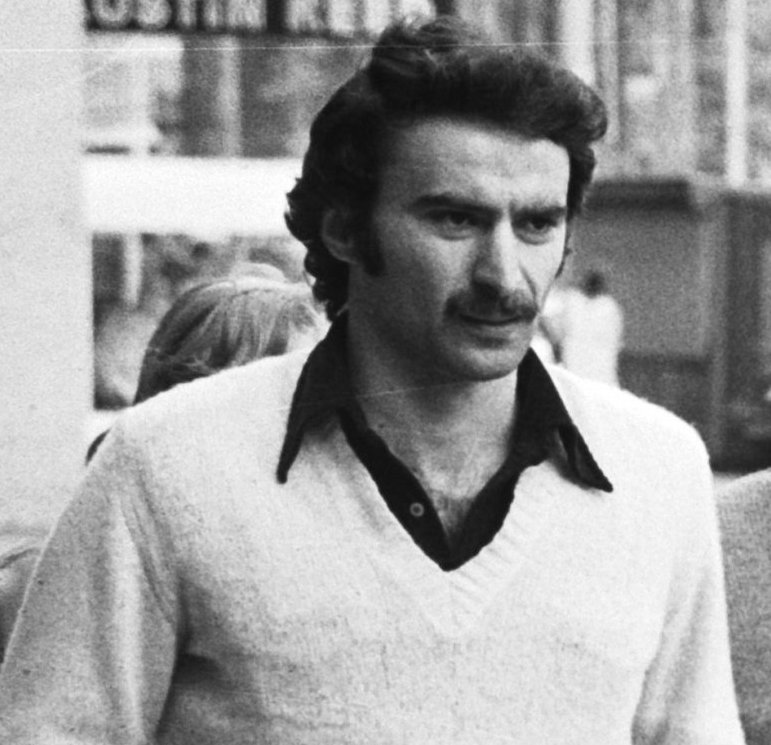
- Chivadze in 1981

Personal information
- Date of birth: 8 April 1955 (age 71)
- Place of birth: Klukhori, Soviet Union
- Height: 1.82 m (6 ft 0 in)
- Position: Defender

Senior career*
Years	Team	Apps	(Gls)
1974–1987	Dinamo Tbilisi	324	(44)

International career
1980–1987	Soviet Union	46	(3)

Managerial career
- 1993–1997: Georgia
- 2001–2003: Georgia
- 2012–2016: Georgia U-21
Medal record
Representing Soviet Union
Men's Football
Bronze medal – third place	1980 Moscow	Team competition
- * Club domestic league appearances and goals

Aleksandre Chivadze (Georgian: ალექსანდრე გაბრიელის ძე ჩივაძე; Russian: Александр Габриэлович Чивадзе; born 8 April 1955) is a Georgian former football player and coach.

Chivadze was born in Klukhori. He spent his entire club career at Dinamo Tbilisi, playing from 1974 to 1987. He earned 46 caps for the Soviet Union national team and was included in the squads of the 1982 and 1986 FIFA World Cups, captaining the team in the 1982 FIFA World Cup.

After retirement from playing he was head coach of the Georgia national team from 1993 to 1997, and again from 2001 to 2003. On 31 January 2012, he became the head coach of the Georgia U21.

== Honours ==
Dinamo Tbilisi

- Soviet Top League: 1978
- Soviet Cup: 1976, 1979
- UEFA Cup Winners' Cup: 1980–81

Individual

- Soviet Footballer of the Year: 1980

Soviet Union U21

- U-21 UEFA Championship: 1980

Preceded by Zviad Sichinava	Presidents of GFF (acting); 2015	Succeeded by Levan Kobiashvili
