= Progress Cup =

The Progress Cup is a football prize (not a tournament) that was awarded by the Russophone "Rabochaya Gazeta" (Kiev) from 1971 until 1991, the collapse of the Soviet Union.

The prize was given to the Soviet Top League club which made the biggest progress in points from the previous season based on mathematical calculations.

== Award holders ==
- 1971 – FC Dynamo Kiev
- 1972 – FC Zorya Voroshilovgrad
- 1973 – FC Dynamo Moscow
- 1974 – FC Chernomorets Odessa
- 1975 – FC Shakhtar Donetsk
- 1976 (spring) – FC Krylia Sovetov Kuybyshev
- 1976 (autumn) – FC Torpedo Moscow
- 1977 – FC Shakhtar Donetsk
- 1978 – FC Spartak Moscow
- 1979 – FC Dinamo Minsk
- 1980 – FC Zenit Leningrad
- 1981 – FC Dynamo Moscow
- 1982 – FC Dinamo Minsk
- 1983 – FC Dnipro Dnipropetrovsk
- 1984 – FC Dynamo Tbilisi
- 1985 – FC Dynamo Kiev
- 1986 – FC Dynamo Moscow
- 1987 – FC Dnipro Dnipropetrovsk
- 1988 – FC Dynamo Kiev
- 1989 – FC Chernomorets Odessa
- 1990 – FC CSKA Moscow

== Performance by club ==
| Club | Winners | Years won |
|---|---|---|
| Dynamo Kiev | 3 | 1971, 1985, 1988 |
| Dynamo Moscow | 3 | 1973, 1981, 1986 |
| Chernomorets Odessa | 3 | 1974, 1989, 1991 |
| Shakhtar Donetsk | 2 | 1975, 1977 |
| Dnipro Dnipropetrovsk | 2 | 1983, 1987 |
| Dinamo Minsk | 2 | 1979, 1982 |
| Zorya Voroshilovgrad | 1 | 1972 |
| Krylia Sovetov Kuybyshev | 1 | 1976 (a) |
| Torpedo Moscow | 1 | 1976 (b) |
| Spartak Moscow | 1 | 1978 |
| Zenit Leningrad | 1 | 1980 |
| Dynamo Tbilisi | 1 | 1984 |
| CSKA Moscow | 1 | 1990 |
