= Yuriy Dehteryov =

Ukrainian footballer (1948–2022)

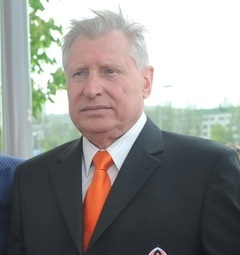
- Dehteryov in 2011

Personal information
- Full name: Yuriy Vitaliyovych Dehteryov
- Date of birth: 5 October 1948
- Place of birth: Stalino, Ukrainian SSR, Soviet Union
- Date of death: 9 October 2022 (aged 74)
- Place of death: Donetsk, Ukraine
- Position: Goalkeeper

Senior career*
Years	Team	Apps	(Gls)
1965–1983	Shakhtar Donetsk	321	(0)

International career
1968–1979	Soviet Union	17	(0)

Managerial career
- 2001–2002: Shakhtar Donetsk (assistant)
- * Club domestic league appearances and goals

Yuriy Vitaliyovych Dehteryov (Ukrainian: Юрій Віталійович Дегтерьов, Russian: Юрий Витальевич Дегтерёв, romanized: Yury Vitalyevich Degteryov; 5 October 1948 – 9 October 2022) was a Ukrainian footballer who played as a goalkeeper.

Dehteryov is considered to be the best goalkeeper and one of the most legendary players to play for Shakhtar Donetsk. He was the first goalkeeper to captain Shakhtar. He held the record for most appearances for Shakhtar and at the time of his death, had the fifth most.

Dehteryov was a member of the football congress of the unrecognised Donetsk People's Republic.

== International career ==
Dehteryov made his debut for Soviet Union on 1 August 1968 in a friendly against Sweden. He played in the 1978 FIFA World Cup and UEFA Euro 1980 qualifiers (USSR did not qualify for the final tournament for either). In his 17 international participations he only allowed 10 goals as well as won 10 of those 17 games. His best games came in October 1977 against France (8 October) and the Netherlands (5 October) where he did not concede a goal in either game.

In 1979, Dehteryov played couple of games for Ukrainian SSR at the Spartakiad of the Peoples of the USSR.

== Career statistics ==
=== Club ===
Appearances and goals by club, season and competition
Club	Season	League		Cup		Europe		Total	
Club	Season	Apps	GA	Apps	GA	Apps	GA	Apps	GA
Shakhtar Donetsk
Shakhtar Donetsk	1967	1	1	–		–		1	1
Shakhtar Donetsk	1968	18	17	4	4	–		22	21
Shakhtar Donetsk	1969	6	4	1	1	–		7	5
Shakhtar Donetsk	1970	2	4	–		–		2	4
Shakhtar Donetsk	1971	29	34	3	4	–		32	38
Shakhtar Donetsk	1972	32	16	2	3	–		34	19
Shakhtar Donetsk	1973	24	22	3	5	–		27	27
Shakhtar Donetsk	1974	25	29	7	7	–		32	36
Shakhtar Donetsk	1975	30	23	1	1	–		31	24
Shakhtar Donetsk	1976 (s)	14	16	3	2	–		17	18
Shakhtar Donetsk	1976 (a)	14	9	–		6	5	20	14
Shakhtar Donetsk	1977	29	24	3	1	–		32	25
Shakhtar Donetsk	1978	21	19	8	4	2	4	31	27
Shakhtar Donetsk	1979	24	20	4	4	2	3	30	27
Shakhtar Donetsk	1980	17	25	6	2	–		23	27
Shakhtar Donetsk	1981	4	5	–		–		4	5
Shakhtar Donetsk	1982	23	26	2	1	–		25	27
Shakhtar Donetsk	1983	8	7	–		–		8	7
Career total		321	301	47	39	10	12	378	352

== Honours ==
Shakhtar Donetsk

- Soviet Cup: 1980

Soviet Union U19

- UEFA European Under-19 Football Championship: 1966, 1967

Individual

- "Ogoniok" Soviet Goalkeeper of the Year: 1977
- Soviet Footballer of the Year third place: 1977
