= Mykhaylo Sokolovskyi =

Soviet footballer (born 1951)

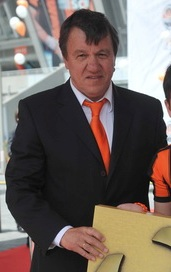

Personal information
- Full name: Mykhaylo Hryhorovych Sokolovskyi
- Date of birth: 15 November 1951 (age 74)
- Place of birth: Sloviansk, Ukrainian SSR
- Height: 1.73 m (5 ft 8 in)
- Positions: Midfielder; striker

Senior career*
Years	Team	Apps	(Gls)
1970	Avanhard Kramatorsk	40	(1)
1971	SKA Kyiv	9	(1)
1972	Chernihiv	35	(11)
1973	Metalurh Zaporizhzhia	38	(5)
1974–1987	Shakhtar Donetsk	400	(87)
1988	Krystal Kherson	45	(3)

Managerial career
- 1995–1996: Shakhtar Donetsk (assistant)
- 1999: Metalurh Donetsk
- * Club domestic league appearances and goals

Mykhaylo Hryhorovych Sokolovskyi (Ukrainian: Михайло Григорович Соколовський; born 15 November 1951) is a Ukrainian professional football coach and a former player. Currently, he works as a scout for FC Metalurh Donetsk.

In recognition of the number of games played for Shakhtar Donetsk he received the Club Loyalty Award in 1987. He was the most titled player of Shakhtar Donetsk during the Soviet Union, and he is considered to be one of the best players in the history of the club.

== Personal life ==
His son Denys Sokolovskyi was also a professional footballer.

== Career statistics ==
=== Club ===
Club	Season	League		Cup		Europe		Super Cup		Total	
Club	Season	Apps	Goals	Apps	Goals	Apps	Goals	Apps	Goals	Apps	Goals
Avanhard	1970	40	1	-	-	-	-	-	-	40	1
SKA Kyiv	1971	9	1	-	-	-	-	-	-	9	1
Chernihiv	1972	35	11	-	-	-	-	-	-	35	11
Metalurh Z	1973	38	5	-	-	-	-	-	-	38	5
Shakhtar	1974	27	5	7	0	-	-	-	-	34	5
Shakhtar	1975	29	11	1	0	-	-	-	-	30	11
Shakhtar	1976 (s)	14	1	4	0	-	-	-	-	18	1
Shakhtar	1976 (a)	15	1	-	-	6	1	-	-	21	2
Shakhtar	1977	29	5	2	0	-	-	-	-	31	5
Shakhtar	1978	29	5	9	2	2	0	-	-	40	7
Shakhtar	1979	32	4	5	0	2	2	-	-	39	6
Shakhtar	1980	33	6	8	2	2	0	-	-	43	8
Shakhtar	1981	32	6	4	1	-	-	1	0	37	7
Shakhtar	1982	26	12	5	0	-	-	-	-	31	12
Shakhtar	1983	34	15	5	2	4	1	-	-	43	18
Shakhtar	1984	34	7	4	0	2	1	2	1	42	9
Shakhtar	1985	30	6	5	3	-	-	-	-	35	9
Shakhtar	1986	27	3	4	1	-	-	1	1	32	5
Shakhtar	1987	9	0	-	-	-	-	-	-	9	0
Krystal	1988	45	3	-	-	-	-	-	-	45	3
Total for Shakhtar		400	87	63	11	18	5	4	2	485	105
Career totals		567	108	63	11	18	5	5	2	652	126

== Honours ==
- Soviet Top League runner-up: 1975, 1979.
- Soviet Top League bronze: 1978.
- Soviet Cup winner: 1980, 1983.
- Soviet Cup finalist: 1986.
