= Palkin =

Palkin (Russian: Палкин, from пaлкa meaning a stick) is a Russian masculine surname, its feminine counterpart is Palkina. It may refer to

- Ksenia Ulukan (née: Palkina in 1989), Kyrgyzstani tennis player
- Serhiy Palkin (born 1974), Ukrainian football functionary
- Sofiya Palkina (born 1998), Russian hammer thrower
