= 1962 Soviet Cup =

1962 Cup of USSR in Football
Кубок СССР

Tournament details
- Country: Soviet Union
- Dates: April 22 – August 11
- Teams: 31 (final stage)

Final positions
- Champions: Shakhter Donetsk
- Runners-up: Znamya Truda Orekhovo-Zuyevo

The 1962 Soviet Cup was an association football cup competition of the Soviet Union.

== Participating teams ==
Enter in First round	Enter in Qualification round		
Class A 22/22 teams	Class B 146/150 teams		
✓ Spartak Moscow; ✓ Dinamo Moscow; ✓ Dinamo Tbilisi; ✓ CSKA Moscow; ✓ Dinamo Kiev; ✓ Pakhtakor Tashkent; ✓ Torpedo Moscow; ✓ Shakhter Donetsk; ✓ SKA Rostov-na-Donu; ✓ Neftianik Baku; ✓ Zenit Leningrad; ✓ Moldova Kishenev; ✓ Lokomotiv Moscow; ✓ Avangard Kharkov; ✓ Torpedo Kutaisi; ✓ Dinamo Leningrad; ✓ Krylya Sovetov Kuibyshev; ✓ Spartak Yerevan; ✓ Belarus Minsk; ✓ Kairat Alma-Ata; ✓ Daugava Riga; ✓ Zhalgiris Vilnius	RSFSR I ✓ Shinnik Yaroslavl; ✓ Spartak Leningrad; ✓ Tekstilschik Ivanovo; ✓ Znamia Truda Orekhovo-Zuyevo; ✓ Vympel Kaliningrad; ✓ Raketa Gorkiy; ✓ Tekstilschik Kostroma; ✓ Khimik Novomoskovsk; ✓ Shakhter Tula; ✓ Volga Kalinin; ✓ Metallurg Cherepovets; ✓ Dinamo Bryansk; ✓ Volna Dzerzhinsk; ✓ Tralflotovets Murmansk; ✓ Sputnik Kaluga; ✓ Onezhets Petrozavodsk; ✗ SKA Leningrad	RSFSR II ✓ Trud Voronezh; ✓ Trudovye Rezervy Kursk; ✓ Serpukhov; ✓ Trud Glukhovo; ✓ Sokol Saratov; ✓ Baltika Kaliningrad; ✓ Torpedo Gorkiy; ✓ Spartak Ryazan; ✓ Zaria Penza; ✓ Torpedo Lipetsk; ✓ Traktor Vladimir; ✓ Torpedo Pavlovo; ✓ Spartak Tambov; ✓ Spartak Smolensk; ✓ Lokomotiv Oryol; ✓ Spartak Saransk	RSFSR III ✓ Spartak Krasnodar; ✓ Traktor Volgograd; ✓ Rostselmash Rostov-na-Donu; ✓ Dinamo Stavropol; ✓ Shakhter Shakhty; ✓ Torpedo Taganrog; ✓ Terek Grozny; ✓ Spartak Ordzhonikidze; ✓ Energiya Volzhskiy; ✓ Dinamo Makhachkala; ✓ Spartak Nalchik; ✓ Torpedo Armavir; ✓ Tsement Novorossiysk; ✓ Trudovye Rezervy Kislovodsk; ✓ Volgar Astrakhan
✓ Spartak Moscow; ✓ Dinamo Moscow; ✓ Dinamo Tbilisi; ✓ CSKA Moscow; ✓ Dinamo Kiev; ✓ Pakhtakor Tashkent; ✓ Torpedo Moscow; ✓ Shakhter Donetsk; ✓ SKA Rostov-na-Donu; ✓ Neftianik Baku; ✓ Zenit Leningrad; ✓ Moldova Kishenev; ✓ Lokomotiv Moscow; ✓ Avangard Kharkov; ✓ Torpedo Kutaisi; ✓ Dinamo Leningrad; ✓ Krylya Sovetov Kuibyshev; ✓ Spartak Yerevan; ✓ Belarus Minsk; ✓ Kairat Alma-Ata; ✓ Daugava Riga; ✓ Zhalgiris Vilnius	RSFSR IV ✓ Uralmash Sverdlovsk; ✓ Lokomotiv Chelyabinsk; ✓ Iskra Kazan; ✓ Stroitel Ufa; ✓ Dinamo Kirov; ✓ Zvezda Perm; ✓ Zenit Izhevsk; ✓ Neftianik Syzran; ✓ Uralets Nizhniy Tagil; ✓ Stroitel Kurgan; ✓ Metallurg Magnitogorsk; ✓ Lokomotiv Orenburg; ✓ Volga Ulyanovsk; ✓ Geolog Tyumen; ✓ Trud Yoshkar-Ola; ✓ Khimik Berezniki	RSFSR V ✓ SKA Novosibirsk; ✓ SKA Khabarovsk; ✓ Luch Vladivostok; ✓ Khimik Kemerovo; ✓ Temp Barnaul; ✓ Lokomotiv Krasnoyarsk; ✓ Irtysh Omsk; ✓ Angara Irkutsk; ✓ Zabaikalets Chita; ✓ Shakhter Prokopyevsk; ✓ Avangard Komsomolsk-na-Amure; ✓ Baikal Ulan-Ude; ✓ Tomich Tomsk; ✓ Amur Blagoveschensk; ✓ Metallurg Novokuznetsk	UkrSSR I ✓ Chernomorets Odessa; ✓ Polesie Zhitomir; ✓ Lokomotiv Donetsk; ✓ SKA Lvov; ✓ Avangard Zholtye Vody; ✓ Shakhter Kadiyevka; ✓ Arsenal Kiev; ✓ Torpedo Kharkov; ✓ Trubnik Nikopol; ✓ Sudostoitel Nikolayev; ✓ Verkhovina Uzhgorod; ✓ Kolgospnik Poltava; ✓ Spartak Stanislav
✓ Spartak Moscow; ✓ Dinamo Moscow; ✓ Dinamo Tbilisi; ✓ CSKA Moscow; ✓ Dinamo Kiev; ✓ Pakhtakor Tashkent; ✓ Torpedo Moscow; ✓ Shakhter Donetsk; ✓ SKA Rostov-na-Donu; ✓ Neftianik Baku; ✓ Zenit Leningrad; ✓ Moldova Kishenev; ✓ Lokomotiv Moscow; ✓ Avangard Kharkov; ✓ Torpedo Kutaisi; ✓ Dinamo Leningrad; ✓ Krylya Sovetov Kuibyshev; ✓ Spartak Yerevan; ✓ Belarus Minsk; ✓ Kairat Alma-Ata; ✓ Daugava Riga; ✓ Zhalgiris Vilnius	UkrSSR II ✓ SKA Odessa; ✓ Metallurg Zaporozhye; ✓ SKA Kiev; ✓ Kolgospnik Rovno; ✓ Dneprovets Dneprodzerzhinsk; ✓ Kolgospnik Cherkassy; ✓ Dinamo Kirovograd; ✓ Mayak Kherson; ✓ Khimik Severodonetsk; ✓ Avangard Chernovtsy; ✓ Gornyak Krivoi Rog; ✓ Shakhter Gorlovka; ✓ Volyn Lutsk	UkrSSR III ✓ Trudovye Rezervy Lugansk; ✓ Avangard Simferopol; ✓ Lokomotiv Vinnitsa; ✓ Desna Chernigov; ✓ Azovstal Zhdanov; ✓ Dnepr Dnepropetrovsk; ✓ Avangard Ternopol; ✓ SKF Sevastopol; ✓ Dinamo Khmelnitskiy; ✓ Neftianik Drogobich; ✓ Shakhter Aleksandria; ✓ Avangard Sumy; ✓ Avangard Kramatorsk	Union republics I ✓ Lokomotiv Gomel; ✓ Shirak Leninakan; ✓ Nairi Yerevan; ✓ Spartak Brest; ✓ Lokomotiv Tbilisi; ✓ Khimik Mogilev; ✓ SKA Minsk; ✓ Dinamo Sukhumi; ✓ Kalev Tallinn; ✓ Neftianye Kamni Baku; ✓ Zveinieks Liyepaya; ✓ Banga Kaunas; ✓ Nistrul Bendery; ✓ Krasnoye Znamia Vitebsk; ✓ Pischevik Tiraspol; ✗ Dinamo Kopli; ✗ REZ Riga
✓ Spartak Moscow; ✓ Dinamo Moscow; ✓ Dinamo Tbilisi; ✓ CSKA Moscow; ✓ Dinamo Kiev; ✓ Pakhtakor Tashkent; ✓ Torpedo Moscow; ✓ Shakhter Donetsk; ✓ SKA Rostov-na-Donu; ✓ Neftianik Baku; ✓ Zenit Leningrad; ✓ Moldova Kishenev; ✓ Lokomotiv Moscow; ✓ Avangard Kharkov; ✓ Torpedo Kutaisi; ✓ Dinamo Leningrad; ✓ Krylya Sovetov Kuibyshev; ✓ Spartak Yerevan; ✓ Belarus Minsk; ✓ Kairat Alma-Ata; ✓ Daugava Riga; ✓ Zhalgiris Vilnius	Union republics II ✓ Shakhter Karaganda; ✓ Alga Frunze; ✓ Metallurg Chimkent; ✓ Stroitel Ashkhabad; ✓ Dinamo Kirovabad; ✓ Energetik Dushanbe; ✓ Dinamo Batumi; ✓ Neftianik Fergana; ✓ Metallurg Rustavi; ✓ Lori Kirovakan; ✓ Pakhtakor Tashkent Oblast; ✓ Kolkhida Poti; ✓ Khimik Chirchik; ✓ Metallist Jambul; ✗ Pamir Leninabad		

Source: []

== Competition schedule ==
=== Preliminary stage ===
==== Group 1 (Russian Federation) ====
===== First round =====
[May 9] 
Dinamo Bryansk                0-3  VYMPEL Kaliningrad (Moskva Reg)
METALLURG Cherepovets         4-1  Volna Dzerzhinsk 
SPARTAK Leningrad             5-1  Onezhets Petrozavodsk 
SPUTNIK Kaluga                1-0  Raketa Sormovo 
TEXTILSHCHIK Ivanovo          2-1  Khimik Novomoskovsk 
TEXTILSHCHIK Kostroma         2-1  Shakhtyor Tula 
TRALFLOTOVETS Murmansk        1-0  Shinnik Yaroslavl  
ZNAMYA TRUDA Orekhovo-Zuyevo  2-0  Volga Kalinin

===== Quarterfinals =====
[May 16] 
SPUTNIK Kaluga                1-0  Tralflotovets Murmansk 
Textilshchik Kostroma         0-2  SPARTAK Leningrad  
VYMPEL Kaliningrad (M.R.)     2-1  Metallurg Cherepovets 
ZNAMYA TRUDA Orekhovo-Zuyevo  4-2  Textilshchik Ivanovo       [aet]

===== Semifinals =====
[May 23] 
SPARTAK Leningrad             3-2  Vympel Kaliningrad (M.R.) 
  [Match abandoned at 86’, when Vympel left the pitch. Awarded to Spartak]
ZNAMYA TRUDA Orekhovo-Zuyevo  4-0  Sputnik Kaluga

===== Final =====
[Jun 5] 
ZNAMYA TRUDA Orekhovo-Zuyevo  5-0  Spartak Leningrad

==== Group 2 (Russian Federation) ====
===== First round =====
[May 9] 
BALTIKA Kaliningrad           1-0  Lokomotiv Oryol  
MVO Serpukhov                 2-0  Spartak Smolensk 
SPARTAK Ryazan                3-0  Torpedo Lipetsk 
Spartak Saransk               0-2  ZARYA Penza 
TRAKTOR Vladimir              4-1  Chaika Gorkiy 
TRUD Noginsk                  2-0  Spartak Tambov 
TRUD Voronezh                 1-0  Torpedo Pavlovo 
TRUDOVIYE REZERVY Kursk       5-2  Sokol Saratov

===== Quarterfinals =====
[May 16] 
BALTIKA Kaliningrad           1-0  Trudoviye Rezervy Kursk    [aet] 
TRAKTOR Vladimir              4-3  Spartak Ryazan 
TRUD Noginsk                  1-0  MVO Serpukhov 
Zarya Penza                   0-2  TRUD Voronezh

===== Semifinals =====
[May 22] 
TRUD Noginsk                  3-2  Traktor Vladimir 
TRUD Voronezh                 1-0  Baltika Kaliningrad

===== Final =====
[May 30] TRUD Voronezh 1-0 Trud Noginsk

==== Group 3 (Russian Federation) ====
===== First round =====
[May 13] 
ROSTSELMASH Rostov-na-Donu    2-1  Torpedo Armavir 
Spartak Orjonikidze           0-0  Terek Grozny 
[May 15] 
SHAKHTYOR Shakhty             1-0  Dinamo Stavropol 
SPARTAK Nalchik               4-1  Dinamo Makhachkala 
TORPEDO Taganrog              1-0  Energiya Volzhskiy 
Trudoviye Rezervy Kislovodsk  0-2  TRAKTOR Volgograd 
VOLGAR Astrakhan              2-0  Spartak Krasnodar

====== First round replays ======
[May 14] 
SPARTAK Orjonikidze           3-2  Terek Grozny

===== Quarterfinals =====
[May 23] 
SHAKHTYOR Shakhty             2-1  Spartak Orjonikidze        [aet] 
SPARTAK Nalchik               1-0  Cement Novorossiysk 
Torpedo Taganrog              2-2  RostSelMash Rostov-na-Donu 
Traktor Volgograd             1-1  Volgar Astrakhan

====== Quarterfinals replays ======
[May 24] 
TORPEDO Taganrog              3-0  RostSelMash Rostov-na-Donu
TRAKTOR Volgograd             3-2  Volgar Astrakhan

===== Semifinals =====
[May 30] 
SHAKHTYOR Shakhty             3-2  Traktor Volgograd 
TORPEDO Taganrog              1-0  Spartak Nalchik

===== Final =====
[Jun 5] 
TORPEDO Taganrog              3-1  Shakhtyor Shakhty

==== Group 4 (Russian Federation) ====
===== First round =====
[May 20] 
DINAMO Kirov                  2-1  Volga Ulyanovsk 
LOKOMOTIV Chelyabinsk         2-1  Khimik Berezniki 
LOKOMOTIV Orenburg            3-2  Metallurg Magnitogorsk 
NEFTYANIK Syzran              3-1  Stroitel Ufa 
Stroitel Kurgan               2-5  ZVEZDA Perm 
Trud Yoshkar-Ola              1-5  ISKRA Kazan 
URALMASH Sverdlovsk           2-1  Geolog Tyumen 
ZENIT Izhevsk                 5-1  Uralets Nizhniy Tagil

===== Quarterfinals =====
[May 23] 
DINAMO Kirov                  1-0  Zenit Izhevsk 
Iskra Kazan                   0-1  LOKOMOTIV Chelyabinsk  
Lokomotiv Orenburg            0-4  URALMASH Sverdlovsk 
ZVEZDA Perm                   3-1  Neftyanik Syzran

===== Semifinals =====
[May 30] 
LOKOMOTIV Chelyabinsk         2-1  UralMash Sverdlovsk 
ZVEZDA Perm                   4-3  Dinamo Kirov

===== Final =====
[Jun 6] 
LOKOMOTIV Chelyabinsk         1-0  Zvezda Perm

==== Group 5 (Russian Federation) ====
===== First round =====
[May 9] 
Amur Blagoveshchensk          1-3  SKA Novosibirsk 
ANGARA Irkutsk                3-0  Shakhtyor Prokopyevsk 
Avangard Komsomolsk-na-Amure  0-1  TEMP Barnaul 
BAYKAL Ulan-Ude               3-1  Metallurg Novokuznetsk 
LOKOMOTIV Krasnoyarsk         3-1  Tomich Tomsk 
Luch Vladivostok              0-2  SKA Khabarovsk 
Zabaikalets Chita             0-3  KHIMIK Kemerovo

===== Quarterfinals =====
[May 24] 
ANGARA Irkutsk                5-0  Baykal Ulan-Ude 
LOKOMOTIV Krasnoyarsk         2-0  Irtysh Omsk 
SKA Novosibirsk               3-1  Khimik Kemerovo 
TEMP Barnaul                  5-3  SKA Khabarovsk

===== Semifinals =====
[May 30] 
LOKOMOTIV Krasnoyarsk         3-1  Angara Irkutsk 
SKA Novosibirsk               3-0  Temp Barnaul

===== Final =====
[Jun 5] 
SKA Novosibirsk               6-1  Lokomotiv Krasnoyarsk

==== Group Ukraine ====
===== First round =====
[Apr 22] 
AVANGARD Zholtyye Vody        3-2  Dinamo Khmelnitskiy 
DINAMO Kirovograd             4-1  Trubnik Nikopol 
DNEPR Dnepropetrovsk          2-1  Lokomotiv Donetsk 
KOLGOSPNIK Cherkassy          1-0  Avangard Chernovtsy 
SHAKHTYOR Gorlovka            4-3  Avangard Kramatorsk 
SPARTAK Ivano-Frankovsk       3-0  Neftyanik Drogobych 
TORPEDO Kharkov               2-1  Avangard Simferopol

===== Second round =====
[May 6] 
AVANGARD Ternopol             2-1  Verkhovina Uzhgorod 
AZOVSTAL Zhdanov              1-0  SKA Lvov 
CHERNOMORETS Odessa           2-1  Avangard Sumy 
Dneprovets Dneprodzerzhinsk   1-4  LOKOMOTIV Vinnitsa 
Kolgospnik Cherkassy          1-1  Dnepr Dnepropetrovsk 
KOLGOSPNIK Poltava            1-0  Torpedo Kharkov 
MAYAK Kherson                 1-0  Desna Chernigov 
METALLURG Zaporozhye          2-0  Arsenal Kiev 
SHAKHTYOR Alexandria          4-3  Kolgospnik Rovno           [aet] 
SHAKHTYOR Gorlovka            3-1  Dinamo Kirovograd 
SHAKHTYOR Kadiyevka           3-0  Khimik Severodonetsk 
SKA Kiev                      1-0  Polesye Zhitomir 
SKF Sevastopol                1-3  SKA Odessa  
Spartak Ivano-Frankovsk       1-1  Avangard Zholtyye Vody 
SUDOSTROITEL Nikolayev        2-0  Volyn Lutsk 
TRUDOVIYE REZERVY Lugansk     1-0  Gornyak Krivoi Rog

====== Second round replays ======
[May 7] 
Kolgospnik Cherkassy          1-1  Dnepr Dnepropetrovsk 
SPARTAK Ivano-Frankovsk       3-0  Avangard Zholtyye Vody 
[May 18] 
KOLGOSPNIK Cherkassy          0-0  Dnepr Dnepropetrovsk       [by draw]

===== Quarterfinals =====
[May 21] 
AVANGARD Ternopol             2-1  Mayak Kherson 
CHERNOMORETS Odessa           1-0  AzovStal Zhdanov 
Kolgospnik Poltava            0-2  KOLGOSPNIK Cherkassy 
METALLURG Zaporozhye          2-1  Shakhtyor Alexandria 
Shakhtyor Kadiyevka           1-2  SKA Kiev 
SKA Odessa                    3-2  Trudoviye Rezervy Lugansk  [aet] 
SPARTAK Ivano-Frankovsk       1-0  Shakhtyor Gorlovka 
Sudostroitel Nikolayev        1-1  Lokomotiv Vinnitsa

====== Quarterfinals replays ======
[May 22] 
SUDOSTROITEL Nikolayev        2-0  Lokomotiv Vinnitsa

===== Semifinals =====
[Jun 3]  
Avangard Ternopol             1-2  CHERNOMORETS Odessa 
SKA Kiev                      2-1  Metallurg Zaporozhye 
Spartak Ivano-Frankovsk       1-2  SKA Odessa  
SUDOSTROITEL Nikolayev        3-1  Kolgospnik Cherkassy

===== Final =====
[Jun 8] 
CHERNOMORETS Odessa           3-0  Sudostroitel Nikolayev 
SKA Odessa                    5-1  SKA Kiev

==== Group 1 (Union republics) ====
===== First round =====
[May 13] 
KHIMIK Mogilyov               2-1  SKA Minsk 
KRASNOYE ZNAMYA Vitebsk       2-1  Shirak Leninakan 
NAIRI Yerevan                 2-0  Dinamo Sukhumi 
NEFTYANYYE KAMNI Baku         1-0  Kalev Tallinn 
PISCHEVIK Tiraspol            2-1  Lokomotiv Tbilisi 
Spartak Brest                 1-2  LOKOMOTIV Gomel 
ZVEJNIEKS Liepaja             1-0  Nistrul Bendery

===== Quarterfinals =====
[May 22] 
BANGA Kaunas                  2-1  Neftyanyye Kamni Baku 
Khimik Mogilyov               0-1  NAIRI Yerevan 
KRASNOYE ZNAMYA Vitebsk       w/o  Zvejnieks Liepaja 
LOKOMOTIV Gomel               3-0  Pischevik Tiraspol

===== Semifinals =====
[May 30] 
LOKOMOTIV Gomel               1-0  Banga Kaunas 
[Jun 10] 
KRASNOYE ZNAMYA Vitebsk       1-0  Nairi Yerevan

===== Final =====
[Jun 14] 
LOKOMOTIV Gomel               4-0  Krasnoye Znamya Vitebsk

==== Group 2 (Union republics) ====
===== First round =====
ALGA Frunze                   3-0  Khimik Chirchik 
METALLURG Chimkent            3-0  Kolkhida Poti 
METALLURG Rustavi             2-0  Metallist Jambul 
NEFTYANIK Fergana             3-1  Energetik Dushanbe 
Pakhtakor Tashkent Region     3-3  Dinamo Batumi 
SHAKHTYOR Karaganda           1-0  Lori Kirovakan

====== First round replays ======
Pakhtakor Tashkent Region     1-2  DINAMO Batumi

===== Quarterfinals =====
Dinamo Batumi                 0-1  METALLURG Rustavi 
DINAMO Kirovabad              1-0  Neftyanik Fergana 
Metallurg Chimkent            0-3  ALGA Frunze 
STROITEL Ashkhabad            4-1  Shakhtyor Karaganda

===== Semifinals =====
DINAMO Kirovabad              2-0  Alga Frunze 
METALLURG Rustavi             4-2  Stroitel Ashkhabad

===== Final =====
DINAMO Kirovabad              2-0  Metallurg Rustavi

=== Final stage ===
==== First round ====
[Jun 9] 
SPARTAK Moskva                3-0  CSKA Moskva 
  [Anatoliy Krutikov 43, 58, Yuriy Falin 70] 
[Jun 16] 
SKA Odessa                    2-1  Kayrat Alma-Ata 
  [D.Podlesny 13, V.Bardeshin 38 – Sergei Kvochkin 10] 
[Jun 17] 
BELARUS Minsk                 3-0  Pahtakor Tashkent 
  [Valeriy Urin 7, Viktor Konovalov 16, Yuriy Pogalnikov 73] 
Chernomorets Odessa           0-1  DINAMO Moskva 
  [Vadim Ivanov 65] 
DAUGAVA Riga                  4-2  Lokomotiv Moskva           [aet] 
  [Vilnis Straume ?, Valeriy Tsyganov 101, Anatoliy Latyntsev 108, Vyacheslav Martynov 115 – Viktor Voroshilov 33 pen, Valentin Bubukin 92] 
DINAMO Kirovabad              1-0  Neftyanik Baku 
  [T.Salahov] 
DINAMO Tbilisi                4-3  Torpedo Kutaisi 
  [Georgiy Sichinava 19, Vladimir Barkaia 43, 63, Zaur Kaloyev 85 – Givi Lezhava 14, 70, Roman Siradze 74] 
KRYLYA SOVETOV Kuibyshev      3-1  Moldova Kishinev 
  [Anatoliy Kazakov ?, Vladimir Grishin 57 pen, Boris Kazakov ? – Vladimir Kobylyanskiy 12] 
Lokomotiv Chelyabinsk         1-2  AVANGARD Kharkov           [aet] 
  [G.Yepishin 106 – Vladimir Todorov 102 pen, Nikolai Korolyov 120] 
Lokomotiv Gomel               0-3  SPARTAK Yerevan 
  [Zhak Suprikyan 45, Felix Arutyunyan 70, ?] 
SHAKHTYOR Donetsk             2-1  Zenit Leningrad 
  [Vitaliy Savelyev 6, Yuriy Zakharov 79 – Nikolai Ryazanov 10] 
SKA Novosibirsk               1-4  TORPEDO Moskva 
  [V.Voitovich – Boris Batanov-2, Nemecio Pozuelo, Valentin Denisov] 
TORPEDO Taganrog              2-0  Žalgiris Vilnius 
  [V.Kitin, G.Borisenko] 
ZNAMYA TRUDA Orekhovo-Zuyevo  3-1  Dinamo Leningrad 
  [Nikolai Sharov 40, 80, Anatoliy Pimenov 60 – Viktor Nikolayev 74] 
[Jun 29] 
Trud Voronezh                 1-2  SKA Rostov-na-Donu 
  [Serafim Andronnikov 12 – Gennadiy Matveyev 64, Vladimir Alentyev 80]

==== Second round ====
[Jun 24] 
ZNAMYA TRUDA Orekhovo-Zuyevo  3-2  Spartak Moskva 
  [Nikolai Sharov 26, 66, Anatoliy Pimenov 53 – Boris Petrov 64, Galimzyan Husainov 86] 
[Jul 10] 
Avangard Kharkov              0-1  SHAKHTYOR Donetsk          [aet] 
  [Yuriy Zakharov 91] 
DINAMO Kirovabad              2-1  Dinamo Kiev 
  [Mikuchadze 64, 74 – Valentin Troyanovskiy 85] 
DINAMO Moskva                 3-0  SKA Odessa 
  [Valeriy Fadeyev 4, Yuriy Vshivtsev 19, Vladimir Kesarev 80] 
SKA Rostov-na-Donu            5-0  Belarus Minsk 
  [Oleg Kopayev 4, 67, Vladimir Alentyev 49, Viktor Ponedelnik 60, Gennadiy Matveyev 88] 
SPARTAK Yerevan               5-0  Krylya Sovetov Kuibyshev 
  [Felix Arutyunyan, Arkadiy Mangasarov, Zhak Suprikyan, Vigen Oganesyan, Oganes Abramyan] 
Torpedo Taganrog              0-4  DAUGAVA Riga 
  [Gunars Ulmanis 3, Anatoliy Syagin 47, Georgiy Smirnov 72, Vladimir Ryzhkin 80] 
[Jul 11] 
TORPEDO Moskva                2-0  Dinamo Tbilisi 
  [Slava Metreveli 60, Vitaliy Denisov 78]

==== Quarterfinals ====
[Jul 31] 
DINAMO Moskva                 4-0  SKA Rostov-na-Donu 
  [Valeriy Maslov 32, Igor Chislenko 73, Vladimir Kesarev 79, Valeriy Korolenkov 84] 
SPARTAK Yerevan               2-1  Daugava Riga 
  [Robert Dalakyan 74, Vitaliy Simbirtsev (D) 86 og – Anatoliy Syagin 16] 
ZNAMYA TRUDA Orekhovo-Zuyevo  1-0  Dinamo Kirovabad 
  [Nikolai Sharov 22] 
[Aug 2] 
SHAKHTYOR Donetsk             4-1  Torpedo Moskva 
  [Vitaliy Savelyev 41, 50, Anatoliy Rodin 60, Yuriy Zakharov ? – Gennadiy Gusarov 10]

==== Semifinals ====
[Aug 5] 
Dinamo Moskva                 0-2  SHAKHTYOR Donetsk 
  [Valentin Sapronov 67, Anatoliy Rodin 89] 
[Aug 6, Moskva] 
ZNAMYA TRUDA Orekhovo-Zuyevo  1-0  Spartak Yerevan 
  [Mikhail Zakharov 80]

==== Final ====
11 August 1962

Shakhter Donetsk	2 – 0	Znamya Truda Orekhovo-Zuyevo
Sapronov 5'; Savelyev 6'	[ Report]

Moscow
