= Vladimir Salkov =

Russian footballer (1937–2020)

Personal information
- Full name: Vladimir Maksimovich Salkov
- Date of birth: 1 April 1937
- Place of birth: Donetsk, Ukraine
- Date of death: 9 July 2020 (aged 83)
- Place of death: Moscow, Russia
- Height: 1.75 m (5 ft 9 in)
- Position: Defender

Youth career
- Shakhtar Stalino

Senior career*
Years	Team	Apps	(Gls)
1957–1958	SKVO Orenburg		
1959	Krylia Sovetov Kuybyshev	6	(0)
1960–1968	Shakhtar Donetsk	231	(3)

Managerial career
- 1970–1971: Metallurg Zhdanov
- 1971–1974: Shakhtar Donetsk (director)
- 1974–1978: Shakhtar Donetsk
- 1979–1980: Torpedo Moscow
- 1981–1983: USSR (Olympic)
- 1984–1986: USSR (assistant)
- 1986–1988: USSR (Olympic) (assistant)
- 1990: USSR (youth)
- 1990–1992: USSR / CIS (assistant)
- 1993–1994: Rotor Volgograd
- 1995: Shakhtar Donetsk
- 2000–2001: Uzbekistan
- 2002: Rotor Volgograd
- 2003–2007: CSKA Moscow (sporting director)
- * Club domestic league appearances and goals

Vladimir Maksimovich Salkov (Russian: Владимир Максимович Сальков, Ukrainian: Володимир Максимович Сальков; 1 April 1937 – 9 July 2020) was a Russian-Ukrainian football manager and defender. He was a Merited Coach of Ukraine (1975) and a Merited Coach of the USSR (1989). He is considered to be one of the most legendary players and managers in the history of Shakhtar Donetsk.

== Player's career ==
Salkov played for the youth team of FC Shakhtar Donetsk, then for their senior team in 1960–1969. Before, he played for SKVO Orenburg and Krylia Sovetov Kuybyshev. Salkov won the Soviet Cup twice (1961, 1962) with Shakhtar. Salkov played for Krylia Sovetov Kuybyshev and Shakhtar Donetsk.

== Coaching ==
After finishing his playing career in 1969 Salkov worked in Metallurg Zhdanov at first and later back for his native Shakhtar Donetsk. In 1988, he won the Olympic gold with the Soviet team. He has also managed various clubs from USSR, Russia, and Ukraine and two national teams (USSR and Uzbekistan). Salkov won Olympic gold as an assistant coach with the Soviet team at the 1988 Summer Olympics. In 1980s he led several Soviet national youth football teams. Salkov also was an assistant manager of Uzbekistan national team.

Salkov also was a sporting director at CSKA Moscow (2005–2007).

== Honours ==
=== As player ===
- Soviet Cup (with Shakhtar Donetsk)

- Champion (2): 1961, 1962

=== As coach ===
- 1988 Summer Olympics (with Soviet team)

- Olympic gold (1): 1988 (as an assistant)

- Ukrainian Cup (with Shakhtar Donetsk)

- Champion (1): 1995

- Soviet Top League (all with Shakhtar Donetsk)

- Runner-up, silver (1): 1975
- Runner-up, bronze (1): 1978

- Soviet Cup (with Shakhtar Donetsk)

- Finalist (1): 1978

- Russian Premier League (with Rotor Volgograd)

- Runner-up, silver (1): 1993
