= Vitaliy Starukhin =

Soviet and Ukrainian footballer (1949–2000)

Personal information
- Full name: Vitaliy Volodymyrovych Starukhin
- Date of birth: 6 June 1949
- Place of birth: Minsk, Belarusian SSR
- Date of death: 9 August 2000 (aged 51)
- Place of death: Donetsk, Ukraine
- Height: 1.83 m (6 ft 0 in)
- Position: Striker

Senior career*
Years	Team	Apps	(Gls)
1968–1971	SKA Odesa	56	(28)
1971–1972	Budivelnyk Poltava	24	(20)
1973–1981	Shakhtar Donetsk	217	(84)
Total		297	(132)

International career
1980	Soviet Union	1	(0)

Managerial career
- 1981–2000: Shakhtar Donetsk (youth)
- * Club domestic league appearances and goals

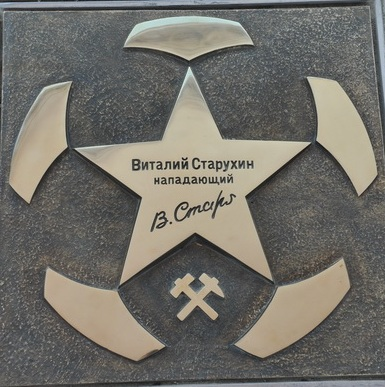
Vitaliy Starukhin's star on Shakhtar's Walk of Fame (Donetsk)

Vitaliy Volodymyrovych Starukhin (Ukrainian: Віталій Володимирович Старухін; 6 June 1949 – 9 August 2000) was a Soviet and Ukrainian professional footballer who played as a forward. He is considered by many fans to one be the greatest players to ever play for Shakhtar Donetsk.

In 1979, he was awarded Player of the year award. In 1979 Starukhin played couple of games for Ukraine at the Spartakiad of the Peoples of the USSR.

In 2011 Vitaly Starukhin, together with Oleg Blokhin and Igor Belanov, was named as "the legends of Ukrainian football" at the Victory of Football awards.

== Career statistics ==
Appearances and goals by club, season and competition
Club	Season	League		Cup		Europe		Super Cup		Total	
Club	Season	Apps	Goals	Apps	Goals	Apps	Goals	Apps	Goals	Apps	Goals
Shakhtar Donetsk	1973	28	10	3	3	0	0	0	0	31	13
Shakhtar Donetsk	1974	28	11	8	4	0	0	0	0	36	15
Shakhtar Donetsk	1975	25	9	0	0	0	0	0	0	25	9
Shakhtar Donetsk	1976 (s)	11	0	3	1	0	0	0	0	14	1
Shakhtar Donetsk	1976 (a)	10	4	0	0	5	2	0	0	15	6
Shakhtar Donetsk	1977	26	9	3	1	0	0	0	0	29	10
Shakhtar Donetsk	1978	25	7	9	4	2	0	0	0	36	11
Shakhtar Donetsk	1979	32	26	2	1	2	0	0	0	36	27
Shakhtar Donetsk	1980	21	5	8	7	2	1	0	0	31	13
Shakhtar Donetsk	1981	11	3	5	2	0	0	1	0	17	5
Total		217	84	41	23	11	3	1	0	270	110

== Honours ==
Shakhtar Donetsk

- Soviet Top League: runner-up 1975, 1979; bronze 1978
- Soviet Cup: 1980

Individual

- Soviet Top League top scorer: 1979 (26 goals)
- Soviet Footballer of the Year: 1979
- Best rookie player: 1973
