= 1972 Soviet First League =

Soviet First League
- Season: 1972

The 1972 Soviet First League was the second season of the Soviet First League and the 32nd season of the Soviet second tier league competition.

== Final standings ==
Pos	Rep	Team	Pld	W	D	L	GF	GA	GD	Pts	Promotion or relegation
1	UZB	(Uzbek Soviet Socialist Republic) Pahtakor Tashkent	38	24	7	7	74	36	+38	55	Promoted
2	UKR	(Ukrainian Soviet Socialist Republic) Shakhtar Donetsk	38	19	13	6	57	21	+36	51	Promoted
3	UKR	(Ukrainian Soviet Socialist Republic) Chornomorets Odessa	38	20	8	10	67	36	+31	48	
4	RUS	(Russian Soviet Federative Socialist Republic) Krylia Sovetov Kuibyshev	38	14	17	7	50	35	+15	45	
5	GEO	(Georgian Soviet Socialist Republic) Torpedo Kutaisi	38	19	6	13	49	32	+17	44	
6	RUS	(Russian Soviet Federative Socialist Republic) Zvezda Perm	38	14	16	8	41	35	+6	44	
7	RUS	(Russian Soviet Federative Socialist Republic) Shinnik Yaroslavl	38	15	10	13	39	44	−5	40	
8	TJK	(Tajik Soviet Socialist Republic) Pamir Dushanbe	38	13	13	12	52	51	+1	39	
9	RUS	(Russian Soviet Federative Socialist Republic) Spartak Orzhonikidze	38	14	10	14	49	50	−1	38	
10	KAZ	(Kazakh Soviet Socialist Republic) Shakhter Karagandy	38	11	13	14	37	48	−11	35	
11	KGZ	(Kirghiz Soviet Socialist Republic) Alga Frunze	38	10	14	14	42	44	−2	34	
12	MDA	(Moldavian Soviet Socialist Republic) Nistru Chișinău (Note: Nistru Kishinev was called Moldova.)	38	11	12	15	39	49	−10	34	
13	RUS	(Russian Soviet Federative Socialist Republic) Tekstilshchik Ivanovo	38	11	12	15	37	52	−15	34	
14	UKR	(Ukrainian Soviet Socialist Republic) Metalurh Zaporizhzhia	38	13	7	18	45	49	−4	33	
15	RUS	(Russian Soviet Federative Socialist Republic) Automobilist Nalchik	38	8	17	13	28	43	−15	33	
16	UKR	(Ukrainian Soviet Socialist Republic) Metallist Kharkiv	38	10	12	16	33	42	−9	32	
17	TKM	(Turkmen Soviet Socialist Republic) Stroitel Ashgabad	38	11	10	17	36	55	−19	32	
18	RUS	(Russian Soviet Federative Socialist Republic) Uralmash Sverdlovsk	38	11	9	18	38	58	−20	31	Relegated
19	UKR	(Ukrainian Soviet Socialist Republic) Kryvbas Kryvyi Rih	38	10	10	18	50	62	−12	30	Relegated
20	RUS	(Russian Soviet Federative Socialist Republic) Dinamo Leningrad	38	7	14	17	32	53	−21	28	Relegated

Source: rsssf.com

== Number of teams by union republic ==
Rank	Union republic	Number of teams	Club(s)
1	RSFSR	8	Krylia Sovetov Kuibyshev, Zvezda Perm, Shinnik Yaroslavl, Spartak Ordzhonikidze, Tekstilschik Ivanovo, Avtomobilist Nalchik, Uralmash Sverdlovsk, Dinamo Leningrad
2	Ukrainian SSR	5	Shakhter Donetsk, Chernomorets Odessa, Metallurg Zaporozhye, Metallist Kharkov, Krivbass Krivoi Rog
3	Uzbek SSR	1	Pakhtakor Tashkent
3	Georgian SSR	1	Torpedo Kutaisi
3	Tajik SSR	1	Pamir Dushanbe
3	Kazakh SSR	1	Shakhter Karaganda
3	Kyrgyz SSR	1	Alga Frunze
3	Moldavian SSR	1	Nistru Kishinev
3	Turkmen SSR	1	Stroitel Ashkhabat
