= FC Shakhtar Donetsk =

Association football club in Ukraine

Shakhtar Donetsk
- Full name: Футбольний клуб «Шахтар» Донецьк; Football Club Shakhtar Donetsk
- Nicknames: Hirnyky (The Miners); Kroty (The Moles)
- Founded: 24 May 1936; 90 years ago
- Ground: Arena Lviv, Lviv Oblast; Stamford Bridge, London (European games)
- Capacity: 34,915; 33,326
- Owner: Rinat Akhmetov
- General Director: Serhiy Palkin
- Head coach: Arda Turan
- League: Ukrainian Premier League
- 2025–26: Ukrainian Premier League, 1st of 16
- Website: shakhtar.com
Home colours	Away colours	Third colours

Football Club Shakhtar Donetsk (Ukrainian: Футбольний клуб Шахтар Донецьк) is a Ukrainian professional football club, currently playing out of Lviv. It was based in the city of Donetsk until 2014, when the War in Donbas forced the club to relocate. It moved from the Donbas Arena to Lviv (2014–2016) and then to Kharkiv (2017–2020), whilst having its headquarters and training facilities in Kyiv. In May 2020, Shakhtar started to play home matches at NSC Olimpiyskyi. Since the beginning of the 2023–24 season, Shakhtar has played home matches once again at Arena Lviv.

Shakhtar became the first Ukrainian club to win a UEFA competition after Ukrainian independence when the team won the UEFA Cup in 2009, the last year before the competition was revamped as the Europa League, by defeating Werder Bremen 2–1. Shakhtar is one of two Ukrainian clubs who have won a major UEFA competition, the other being Dynamo Kyiv. It is one of Ukraine's most popular clubs, is particularly favoured in the eastern Donbas region. The club draws its history from the very start of the Soviet football league competitions and is one of the oldest clubs in Ukraine. The club was a member of the Soviet Voluntary Sports Society of Shakhtyor, having connections with Karaganda (Kazakhstan) and Soligorsk (Belarus) among others. In the late Soviet period, Shakhtar was considered a mid-table club of the Soviet Top League and won the Soviet Cup two years in a row, in 1961 and 1962.

== History ==
=== Names and etymology ===
The team has played under the following names: Stakhanovets (1936–46), Shakhtyor (Shakhtar) (1946–92), and FC Shakhtar (1992–present). It has a meaningful association with the Donets Basin underground coal-mining using vertical mining shafts, called Schacht in German. This was taken over into Cyrillic Шахтн, end re-transcribed into Latin letters as, for example, shakt in English use. As part of the so-called Stalin industrialisation and Stakhanovite movement, in 1936 the local football teams of Dynamo sports societies of Horlivka and Stalino (today Donetsk) established a joint team that represented the mining volunteer sports society Stakhanovets (later Shakhter). The team was transferred from the sports society for the NKVD to a trade union "volunteered sports society" (DSO).

Following the World War II, the DSO Stakhanovets changed its name to DSO Shakhter which in the Ukrainian SSR had its local corresponding nomenclature as DSS Shakhtar. The word "Shakhter" or "Shakhtar" means a coal miner working at a sub-surface mine, shafted mine, shakhta is a derivative of shaft.

During the dissolution of the Soviet Union (1989–1992), the Donetsk club was reorganized and commercialized as a professional football team. It also made its Ukrainian name as its only name, Шахтар Донецьк, with Shakhtar Donetsk in English, Schachtar Donezk in German and Szachtar Donieck in Polish, the latter two being languages of countries that hosted international "home" games for the club due to the situation since 2014.

=== Early years – first two decades ===
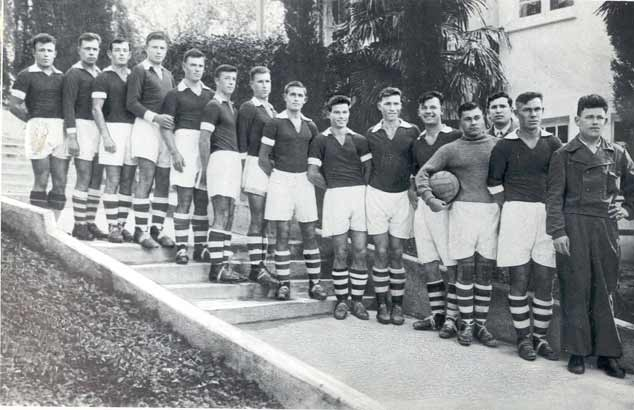
The team in 1937.

The Shakhtar club was originally formed on a decision of the All-Union Council on Physical Culture and Sports of 3 April 1936. It was initially named Stakhanovets, meaning "the participant of Stakhanovite movement", which derived from Aleksei Stakhanov, a coal-miner in the Donbas and propaganda celebrity in 1935. The first team was based upon two other local teams, the participants of the All-Ukrainian Spartakiads: Dynamo Horlivka and Dynamo Stalino. The first game was against Dynamo Odesa as part of the 1936 Cup of the Ukrainian SSR (at that time known as Ukrainian spring challenge) and took place on 12 May 1936 at Balitsky Stadium in Horlivka (the first home stadium). The team that played as Stakhonovets Horlivka lost 3–2 after scoring the first goal by Mykhailo Pashchenko, (Note: some sources suggest it was Kostiantyn Pashchenko instead of Mykhailo Pashchenko.) the second goal belonged to Boris Terentiev.

Its first league game in Group V took place on 24 May 1936 against Dynamo Kazan was even more disappointing, which miners lost 4–1. Stakhonovets that had on its roster 15 players left for Kazan by train on 20 May. Beside players, as part of delegation there were representative of regional council of physical culture Gololobov and republican referee I.Rozanov. The team returned to Stalino on 28 May and the same day Gololobov in interview to newspaper "Stalinskiy rabochiy" told that "... the game in Kazan with local "Dynamo" was witnessed by 3,000 spectators. With the first minutes, the field hosts offered a high pace.

The "Miners", who were road weary, could not respond with the same. On the 13th minute they conceded the first goal and by the end of first half, two more. In many respects the reason was poor performance of right halfback Kutsev (who played instead of K.Pashchenko) and right outside forward Korotynsky. Through their flank Dynamo players successfully attacked. In the first half Stakhanovets forwards looked bleak and uncertain. In the second half the game equalized and on 55th minute Fedor Manov opened score to Donetsk team goals. Final score is 4–1 in favor of the hosts."

Nonetheless, the selective job conducted constructively by the club's administration allowed the club to compete successfully at the top level by the end of the 1930s. During the war championship of 1941, which was interrupted unexpectedly, the club defeated Soviet champions Dynamo Moscow and after about ten games were placed in fifth in the league. In the last game of that championship, played on 24 June, two days after the start of the Great Patriotic War, which they lost at home to Traktor Stalingrad. During the war many players went to frontlines and perished among which are Ivan Ustinov, Ivan Putyatov, Volodymyr Shkurov, Ivan Horobets, Mykhailo Vasin and others. From the pre-war squad in 1945 there were left only three players Georgiy Bikezin, Mykola Kuznetsov, and Petro Yurchenko.

The All-Union coal mining society of Stakhanovite (Stakhanovets) had changed its name in July 1946 to Shakhtyor (Shakhter) and so did the Sports Society of Donbas Miners. The term Shakhtar or Shakhter (Russian variation) is occupational referring to a miner working in a subterranean mining shaft (see shaft mining), the word "shakhtar" is a local adaptation and derivative of shaft. In the Soviet Union, due to an elevated risk working underground, a subterranean mining job was more compensated in relation to other unskilled work and always in demand.

In 1950, Viktor Fomin was named Ukrainian Footballer of the Year, despite the club finishing only 11th in the league. The first success for the team was in 1951, when it achieved third place in the USSR Championship. The most notable player of that achievement was the striker Aleksandr Ponomarev, who came to finish his football career in Donbas, the region he was born in, and was named Ukrainian Footballer of the Year for 1951. Despite the latest achievement, Shakhtar was relegated at the end of the 1952 season and as part of the re-organization of the team, former player Aleksandr Ponomarev became the head coach of the club. In 1954, Shakhtar under Ponomarev won the Class B League, thus sealing a return to the top league.

=== Cup triumphs and establishment in the Soviet League ===
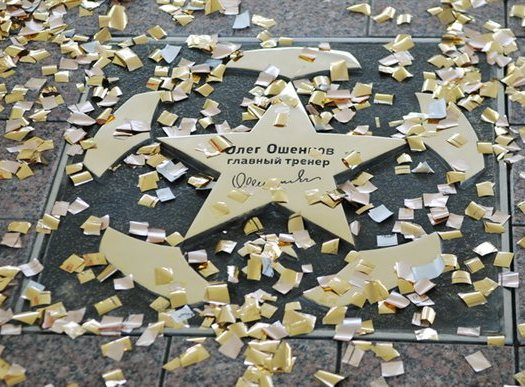
A star in the Shakhtar Walk of Fame in honor of Oleg Oshenkov, who as manager twice led Shakhtar to Soviet Cup victory.

In 1958, the players of the club received fewer yellow and red cards than any other team in the championship, for what the Sovetsky Sport newspaper awarded the club with the "Fair Play Award." In the 1960s, Shakhtar, under Oleg Oshenkov's coaching, were three-time USSR Cup finalists, winning it twice in 1961 and 1962. Among the players playing for the club then where defenders Viacheslav Aliabiev and Vladimir Salkov. The club was nicknamed "The Cup Team" due to Shakhtar's success in vying for the trophy every year. The Miners' more notable achievements, however, occurred later from the mid-1970s to the early 1980s.

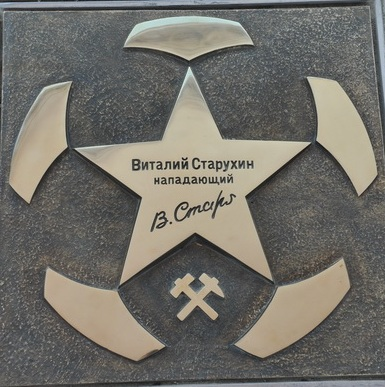
A star in the Shakhtar Walk of Fame in honor of Vitaliy Starukhin, considered by many fans the greatest player in the history of Shakhtar.

Despite the departure of the team's leader midfielder Anatoliy Konkov, in 1975, Shakhtar under management of former player Vladimir Salkov, earned second place in the USSR Championship and received the right to represent the Soviet Union in European competition. At the end of the season, Shakhtar received the Progress Cup for making the biggest progress from previous season in the league. They received the award again in 1977. In 1978, Shakhtar finished third in the USSR Championship.

In 1979, the team finished second in the league campaign and its captain—striker Vitaliy Starukhin—became the top scorer in the USSR Championship with 26 goals scored, also being named Soviet Footballer of the Year. The club was only two points away from the first place, despite having important players leaving the club before the season, and other important players receiving injuries.

Other important players besides Starukhin at the time were Mykhaylo Sokolovskyi, who went on to set a caps record for the club (for what he received the Club Loyalty Award in 1987), defenders Viktor Zvyahintsev and Valeriy Horbunov, who both made it numerous times to the 33 Top Players of the Soviet Championship lists, and goalkeeper Yuriy Dehteryov, who was named Soviet goalkeeper of the year and took third place for Soviet Footballer of the Year in 1977.

Shakhtar twice, in 1980 and 1983, brought home the crystal USSR Cup to Donetsk and in 1983, it won the USSR Super Cup over then-domestic league champions Dnipro Dnipropetrovsk. Shakhtar reached the 1983–84 European Cup Winners' Cup quarter-final, and strikers Viktor Hrachov and Serhiy N. Morozov became joint top scorers of the tournament. In 1987, Shakhtar received the fewest yellow and red cards in the championship, for which the club was awarded the "Soviet Top League Fair Play Award" by Man and Law magazine. Between 1982 and 1988, Shakhtar received the "Together With The Club" award five times, an award given for good organization of home games and behaviour of the home fans.

During the Perestroika period, the Shakhtar team of masters separated from the Shakhtar Donetsk sports society into a professional club. It was part of the so-called khozraschet period or a "self-management", which was part of many Soviet organizations at that time. Other departments of the Shakhtar Donetsk sports society formed their own clubs independent from their parent organization.

=== First decade in independent Ukraine – the beginning of the Akhmetov era ===
In the newly independent Ukraine, Shakhtar, along with Dynamo Kyiv, became perennial first place competitors. A bombing-assassination took place at the team's stadium, killing club president Akhat Bragin in October 1995. In 1996, Rinat Akhmetov took over as president and invested heavily in the club.

Despite Shakhtar not being a strong contender for the championship at the time, finishing second many times with a large point gap from the first-place position, they won the Ukrainian Cup three times, in 1995 (under the management of former player Vladimir Salkov), 1997 and 2001. In the 1997–98 UEFA Cup Winners' Cup, Shakhtar were eliminated after a 5–2 aggregate loss to Vicenza, losing the first and second legs. Important players at the time were defenders Serhiy Popov and Mykhaylo Starostyak, goalkeeper Dmytro Shutkov, striker Oleh Matvyeyev (who was top scorer of the Premier League in the 1996–97 season), and midfielders Hennadiy Orbu, Valeriy Kryventsov and Ihor Petrov. Most of the players playing for the team of the time came through the team's youth ranks.

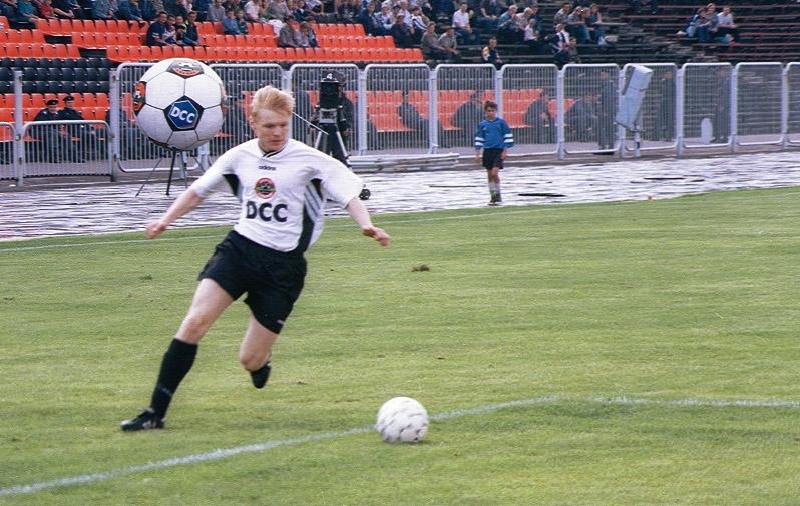
Shakhtar's jersey with DCC instead of SCM

Towards the end of the decade, the team finally started to look like a team able to become champion. In 1999, a Shakhtar football academy was opened and now hosts football training for roughly 3,000 youth. In 2000, Andriy Vorobey was named Ukrainian Footballer of the Year by Komanda, the first Shakhtar player in independent Ukraine to do so, and became the top scorer in the 2000–01 Vyshcha Liha. That year, Shakhtar competed in the UEFA Champions League for the first time, drawn in a group with Lazio, Arsenal and Sparta Prague. They finished third in the group, qualifying for the UEFA Cup after a 3–0 home win against Arsenal.

=== First league triumph ===
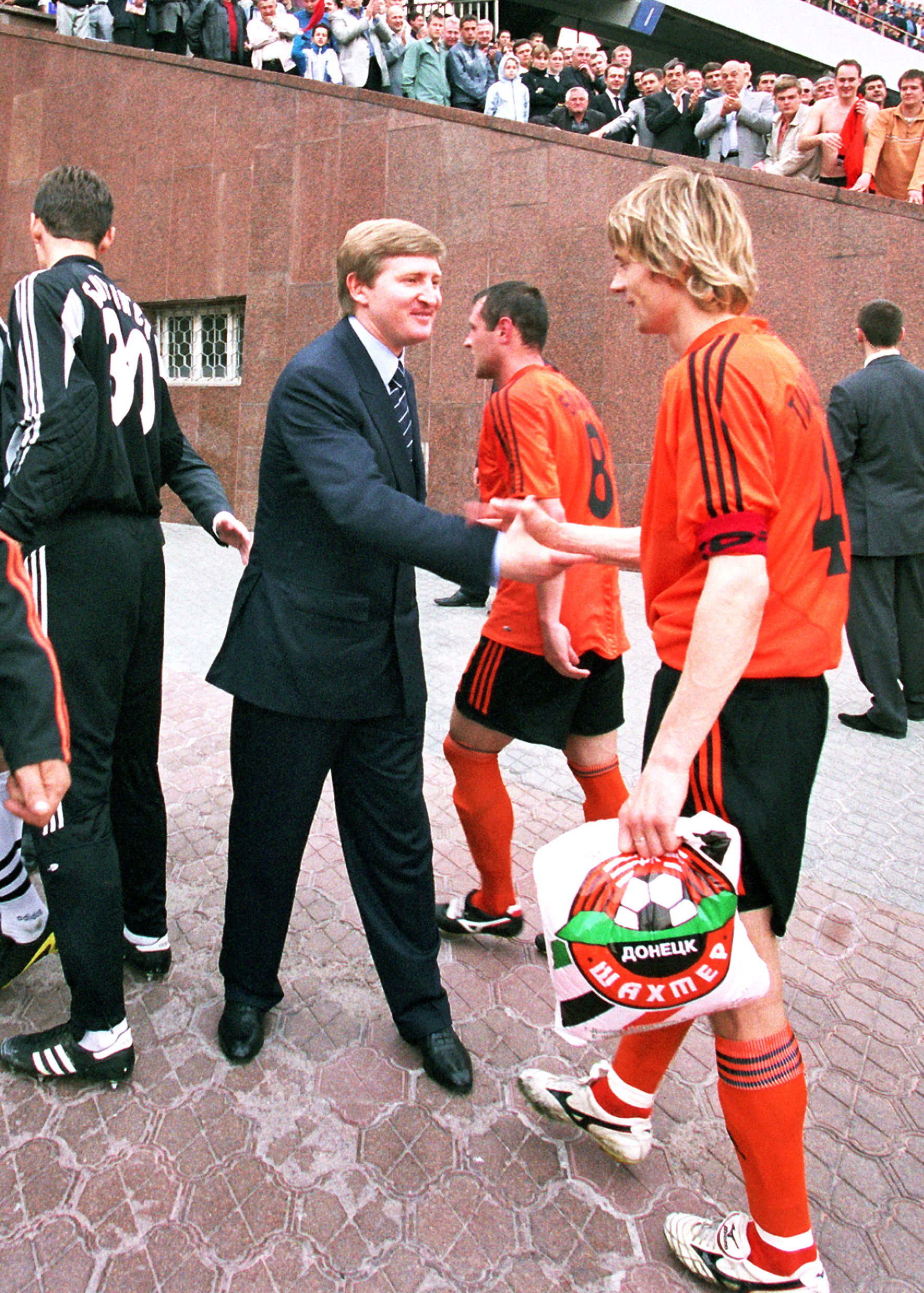
President of the club, Rinat Akhmetov, shaking hands with captain Anatoliy Tymoshchuk, 2002 Ukrainian Footballer of the Year.

The club won its first Ukrainian Premier League title in the 2001–02 season under coach Nevio Scala, winning by a single point over Dynamo Kyiv. They were also victorious in the 2001–02 Ukrainian Cup, defeating Dynamo 3–2 after extra time in the final. Among the key players at the club at the time were captain defensive midfielder Anatoliy Tymoshchuk, striker Andriy Vorobey, midfielder Hennadiy Zubov and defender Mykhaylo Starostyak. At the end of the season, Tymoshchuk, who emerged as the club's leader on the field, was named Ukrainian Footballer of the Year by Komanda and Ukrainskiy Football.

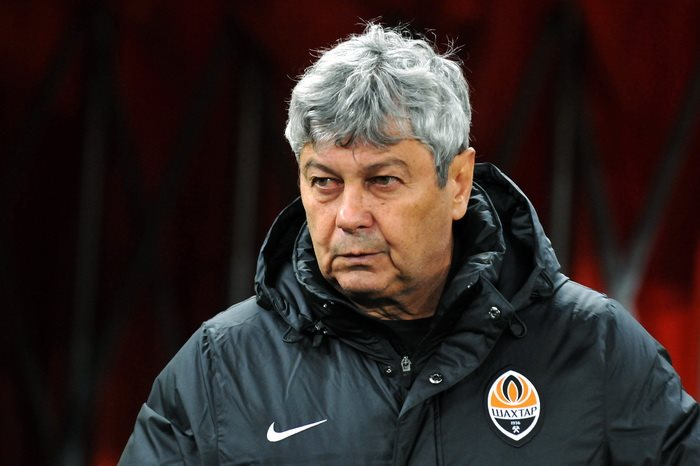
Manager Mircea Lucescu took over Shakhtar in 2004 and has led them to becoming the dominant force in the league.

After multiple managerial changes, in 2004 the Romanian Mircea Lucescu was invited to build a team in Shakhtar. After ten days at the club, he won the 2003–04 Ukrainian Cup and after three months, for the first time in club history, the club made it to the UEFA Champions League group stage, which won him the 2004 Romania Coach of the Year title. The strategy chosen was looking for young talented players in Brazil, which was to form the base of the attack, while the defence would supplied by largely Ukrainian talent in order to adjust to rules forcing teams to have a certain number of local players on the field.

The large amount of Brazilians arriving at the club earned Shakhtar the nickname "the most Brazilian club in Europe". They won their second Premier League title in the 2004–05 season, but lost to Dynamo Kyiv in the inaugural Ukrainian Super Cup tournament in 2004. They finished as runners up in the 2004–05 Ukrainian Cup, losing to Dynamo in a penalty shoot-out the final.

They retained the Premier League crown in the 2005–06 season and managed to avenge the defeat to Dynamo in the previous Super Cup by defeating them on penalties to win their first-ever Super Cup title. At the end of the season, Anatoliy Tymoshchuk was named Ukrainian Footballer of the Year for by Ukrainian Football for the second time, becoming the first Shakhtar player to be named so more than once. Brazilian striker Brandão became the league's joint top scorer.

Shakhtar appeared in all three editions of the Channel One Cup, winning the 2007 edition and finishing runners-up in 2008. Having missed out on the league title in 2006–07, Shakhtar regained the title in 2007–08, also being victorious in the Ukrainian Cup after defeating Dynamo Kyiv 2–0 in the final. Shakhtar's attendance levels at league matches have continually risen over the years to a point where they averaged 36,983 spectators over the 2011–12 Premier League season.

=== UEFA Cup triumph and domination in Ukraine ===
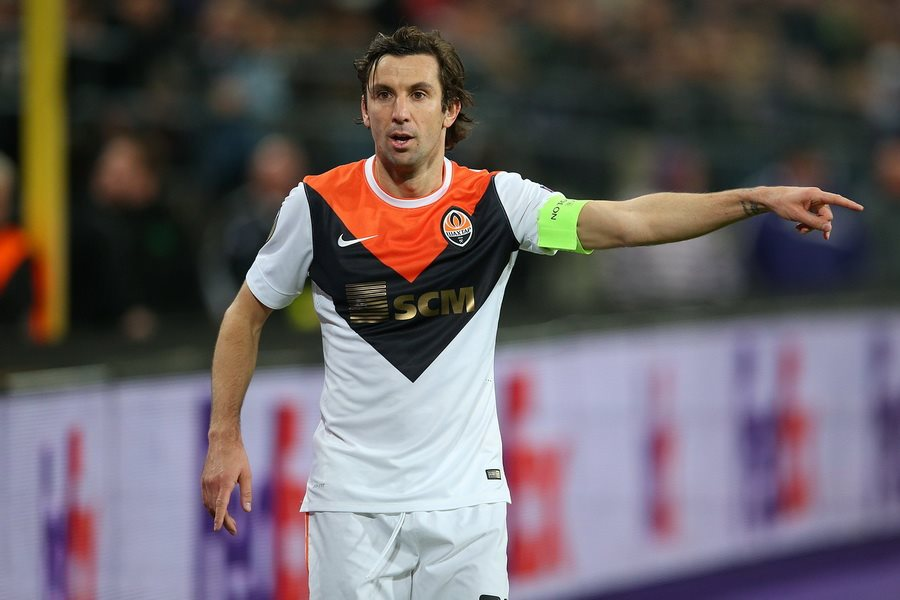
Team captain Darijo Srna, one of the greatest players in the history of the team and considered by some "the icon of Shakhtar."

In 2009, they became only the second Ukrainian team to win a European competition (and the first since independence), and the first to win the UEFA Cup after defeating Werder Bremen in the final, with goals from Brazilians Luiz Adriano and Jádson. The victory earned the player Mariusz Lewandowski the 2009 Polish Footballer of the Year award. This also made them the last UEFA Cup winners before the tournament was rebranded as the UEFA Europa League.

Before the start of the 2009–10 season, Shakhtar won the friendly Uhrencup tournament. Shakhtar won the Premier League title in the 2009–10 season, goalkeeper Andriy Pyatov was named Ukraine Premier League MVP by Komanda, and Manager Mircea Lucescu was named Romania Coach of the Year for the second time. The 2010–11 season was a very successful one for Shakhtar. They reached the quarter-finals of the Champions League, their then-best-ever performance in the competition.

Captain Darijo Srna was chosen to be part of the Champions League Team of the Season as voted by fans. They also won a domestic treble with victory in the Premier League, Ukrainian Cup and the Super Cup. The successful season did not go unnoticed by the experts, and in 2011, the IFFHS gave Shakhtar a special award for making the biggest progress of the decade among football clubs.

They went on to win the Premier League and Ukrainian Cup in the 2011–12 season. Shakhtar player Yevhen Seleznyov topped the goal scoring charts in the league, with 14 goals, midfielder Henrikh Mkhitaryan was named Armenian Footballer of the Year, and manager Mircea Lucescu was named 2012 Romania Coach of the Year, receiving the award for the third time. The main players at that time were captain Darijo Srna, defender Yaroslav Rakitskyi, Armenian midfielder Henrikh Mkhitaryan (who was named Armenian Footballer of the Year twice while playing for Shakhtar) and Brazilian midfielders Fernandinho and Willian.

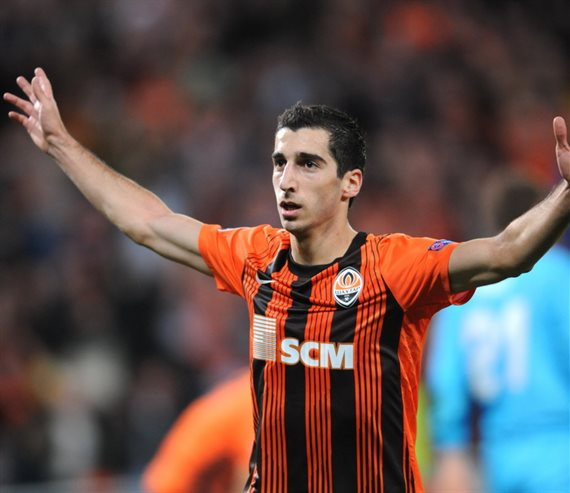
Henrikh Mkhitaryan was named the 2012 CIS Footballer of the Year and set the Ukrainian Premier League record for goals scored in one season (25).

In the 2012–13 season Shakhtar won the Premier League, Cup and Super Cup. Henrikh Mkhitaryan became the top scorer of the league, setting a Ukrainian championship record of 25 goals. He was also named the Ukraine Premier League MVP by Komanda, Armenian Footballer of the Year and the CIS Footballer of the Year for 2012.

=== Leaders depart and new titles ===
Prior to the 2013–14 season, many of the club's main players were sold after Shakhtar accepted high bids for them – Henrikh Mkhitaryan, Fernandinho and Willian brought the club over €100 million. Shakhtar spent the following summer trying to integrate new young players into the team, who along with the remaining players were to form the backbone of the renewed Shakhtar. Despite selling its leaders, before the 2013–14 season, Shakhtar set a new record for East Europe for number of season tickets sold. Before the beginning of the 2013–14 season, Shakhtar won two friendly tournaments in Abu Dhabi, the Match World Cup, and the Super Cup of Champions played against Russian champions Zenit Saint Petersburg.

In the mid-season break, Shakhtar won the 2014 United Supercup (the second edition of the United Tournament), a tournament between the top-two placed clubs of Ukraine and of Russia, which strengthened Shakhtar's status as the strongest club in Eastern Europe. At the end of the 2013–14 season, Shakhtar won the Ukraine Premier League, while Luiz Adriano was the league top scorer. Shakhtar also won the 2014 Ukrainian Super Cup, holding the trophy for the sixth time. Manager Mircea Lucescu was named the 2014 Romania Coach of the Year, receiving the award for the fourth time.

=== The war in Donbas ===
Due to the war in Donbas, Shakhtar had to temporarily move and play its games in Arena Lviv, resulting in very low attendance. As an anti-war protest, the players of Shakhtar refused the initiative to wear the "Glory to the Ukrainian Army" shirts. In the 2014–15 UEFA Champions League, Shakhtar finished second in the group stage, therefore qualifying to the next stage. Striker Luiz Adriano equaled both Lionel Messi's record of five goals in a Champions League match and Cristiano Ronaldo's record of scoring nine goals in the group stage; as a result, UEFA named him MVP of the competition's group stage. Shakhtar finished the season second in the 2014–15 Ukrainian Premier League after playing the whole season away from Donbas, with Alex Teixeira finishing as a joint top scorer in the league. At the end of the season, Douglas Costa was sold to Bayern Munich, while Luiz Adriano moved to Milan.

While the club itself moved to a Ukraine-controlled zone, a few prominent Shakhtar players remained in the Donetsk People's Republic and supported the unrecognised state. Among them were former defender Viktor Zvyahintsev, former goalkeeper Yuriy Dehteryov, former Shakhtar and Ukraine national football team captain Ihor Petrov, and the club's first press officer Vyacheslav Sharafutdinov.

During the 2015–16 Ukrainian Premier League, on 16 October, Shakhtar beat Dynamo Kyiv 3–0 in Kyiv and set two new records. One record was that for the first time during a Klasychne derby game in Kyiv a team scored three goals. The other record was that for the first time Shakhtar had more Klasychne derby victories, 26, than Dynamo. In the middle of the season, Alex Teixeira moved to Chinese club Jiangsu Suning for a fee of €50 million, breaking both the Asian and Ukrainian transfer record. The club finished the 2015/16 season as runner up and Marlos was recognised best league player by Komanda. After the 2015–16 season, long-time manager Mircea Lucescu moved on to Zenit Saint Petersburg; he was replaced by the Portuguese Paulo Fonseca, previously of Braga.

Following the winter break of the 2016–17 season, a season when the club won the league, cup, and supercup, they moved to the Metalist Stadium in Kharkiv (241 km to the north of Donetsk). In 2017–18, the club won the league and cup again, with Facundo Ferreyra becoming the league top scorer and Marlos the assist leader. In 2018–19, the club won Ukrainian Premier League for the third time in a row. In 2019–20, Shakhtar retained their league title for the fourth time in a row. They also reached the semi-finals of the 2019–20 UEFA Europa League.

== Infrastructure ==
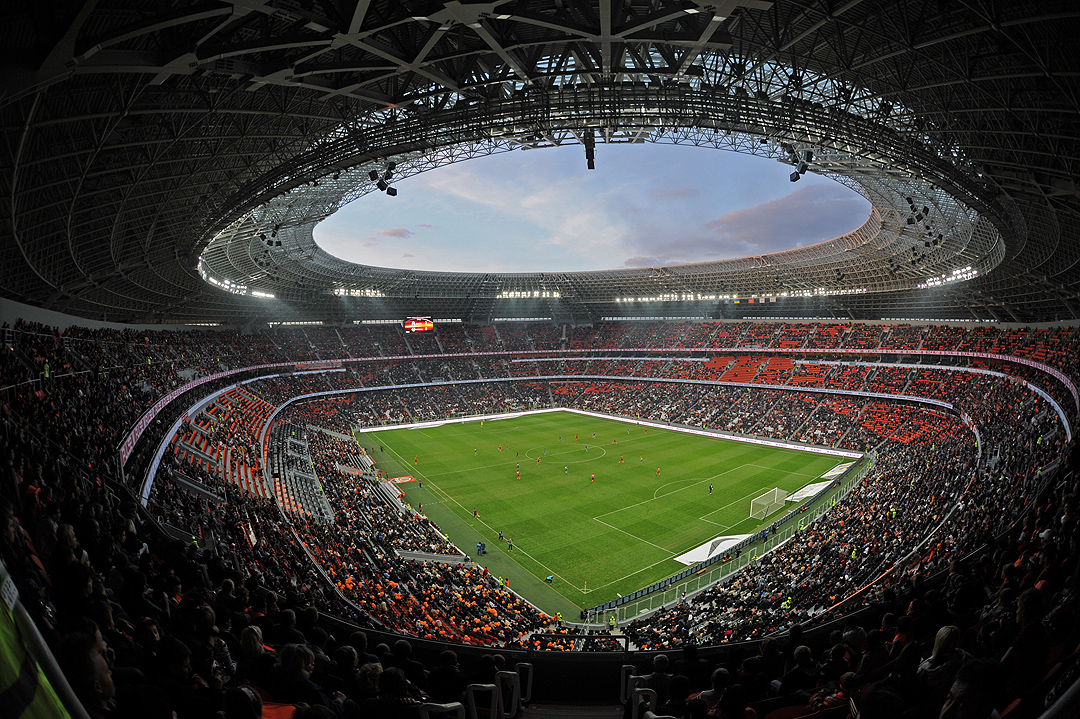
Donbas Arena has been awarded a UEFA four star rating, the highest rating achievable.

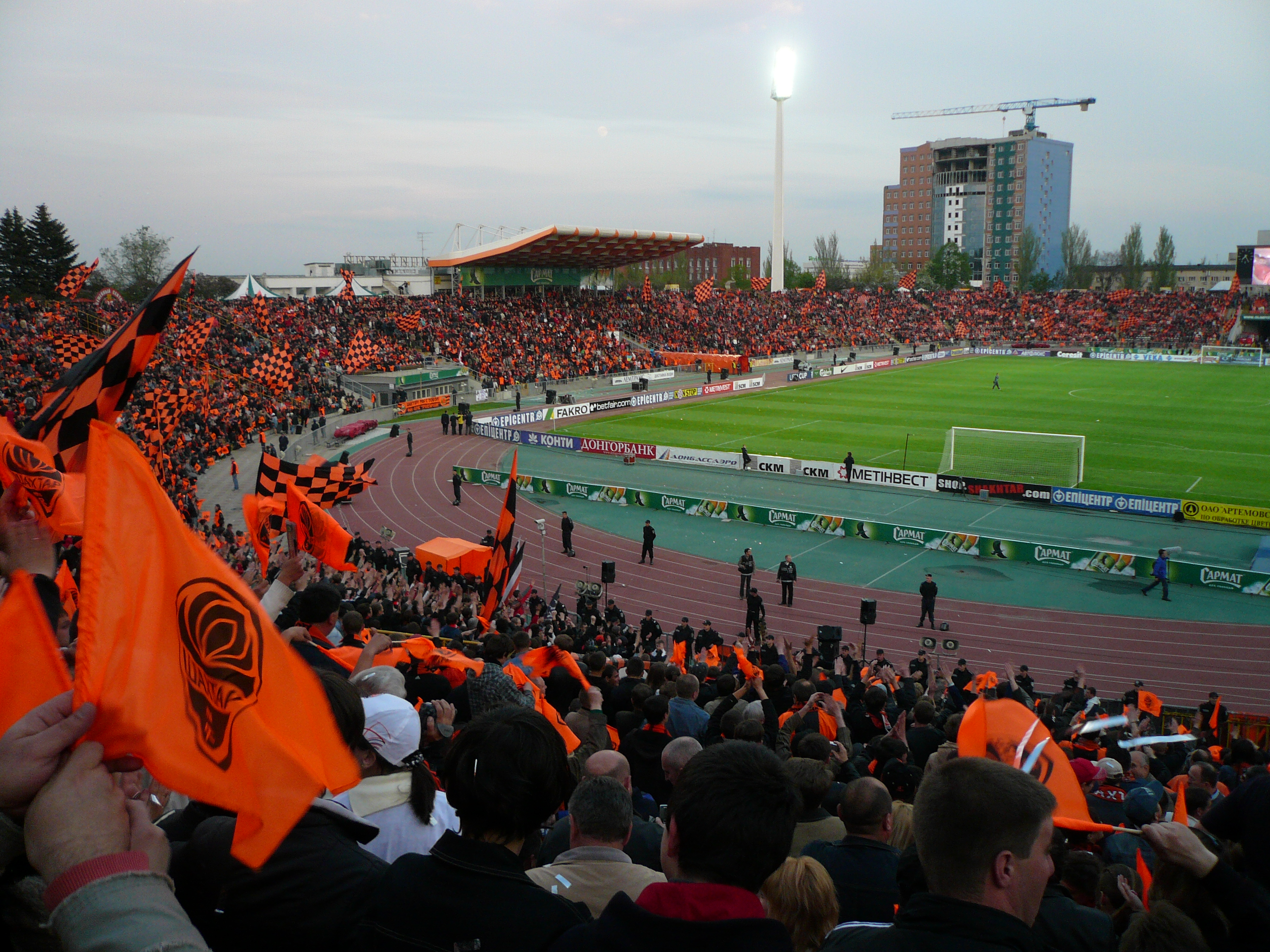
RSC Olimpiyskyi

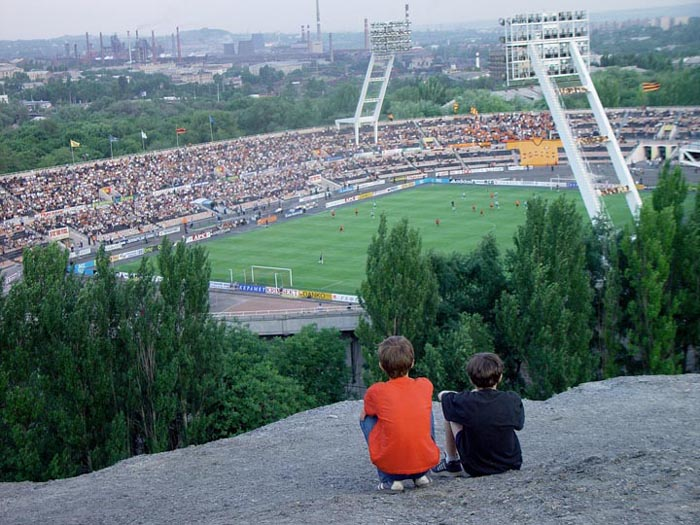
Shakhtar Stadium as seen from tailings (locally terra-cone)

Until 2009, Shakhtar had been playing most of its games at the RSC Olimpiyskyi stadium, which is a property of the administration of Donetsk Oblast and the Serhiy Bubka College of Olympic Reserve. The stadium was built during the Soviet period for another Donetsk club, FC Lokomotyv Donetsk, and carried its name.

On 29 August 2009, the construction of its new stadium, Donbas Arena, was accomplished, and the stadium was opened. Located in the City Park of Culture and Recreation, it has a capacity of 50,149 and has been honored with a UEFA five-star rating, the highest rating achievable.

Shakhtar's old home, the Central Stadium "Shakhtar", which was built in 1936 and reconstructed four times, had been used by Shakhtar Donetsk Reserves. The stadium received some major renovations, including the installation of bench seats in 2000 when Shakhtar made it to the Champions League Group Stage.

A mascot mole (moles is a nickname for the club) will entertain spectators during the home matches. Shakhtar are rated 40th by the average game attendance, being the top Eastern European club on the rating charts. Before the 2013–14 season, Shakhtar set a new record for Eastern Europe for number of season tickets sold, selling 27,000 season tickets, which means 52% of the seats in Donbas Arena belong to season ticket holders.

From 2014 until the end of 2016, due to the war in Donbas, Shakhtar played its home matches at the Arena Lviv. Following the winter break of the 2016–17 season the club moved to the Metalist Stadium in Kharkiv (250 kilometers to the northwest of Donetsk). Shakhtar played their 2022–23 matches in the Champions League and Europa League at Stadion Wojska Polskiego in Warsaw due to the 2022 invasion. They played their 2023–24 UEFA Champions League and 2023–24 UEFA Europa League matches at Volksparkstadion in Hamburg, Germany. Next season of their 2024–25 UEFA Champions League Shakhtar played at Arena AufSchalke in Gelsenkirchen, Germany. Their 2025–26 UEFA Europa League Shakhtar started out at Stožice Stadium in Ljubljana, Slovenia and later Henryk Reyman Municipal Stadium in Kraków, Poland. For the 2026–27 UEFA Champions League, Shakhtar will use Chelsea's stadium, Stamford Bridge.

=== Training centre ===
Shakhtar Donetsk has its training facilities for its first team, reserve team, and youth academy, all located at Kirsha Training Centre.

Due to the war conditions in the eastern Ukraine, Shakhtar temporary venue for its home matches has changed several times, while it was announced that the team will use training facilities in Kyiv. It was clarified that its training facility is the Training base of Olympic Preparation "Sviatoshyn" located 20 km (12 mi) away from Kyiv and belongs to the Ukrainian Federation of Trade Unions.

=== Youth, academy and reserves ===
The club used to field a couple of reserve teams that competed at a professional level. By 2015, all reserve teams, such as FC Shakhtar-2 Donetsk and FC Shakhtar-3 Donetsk were withdrawn from professional competitions. The club, however, fields its youth Shakhtar U-21 team in the youth championship of Ukrainian Premier League. Shakhtar also has its football academy that fields four teams in a special youth league designated for teenagers. Since 2012, the club has also had a team for the U-19 championship of the Ukrainian Premier League.

During the Soviet times, the club used to have one youth team named Shakhter-D Donetsk that participated in a separate Soviet championship for doubles. Shakhter-D later was reorganized into FC Shakhtar-2 Donetsk and admitted to the Ukrainian First League.

Due to the 2022 invasion of Ukraine, the youth academy has relocated to Split, Croatia.

== Crests and colours ==
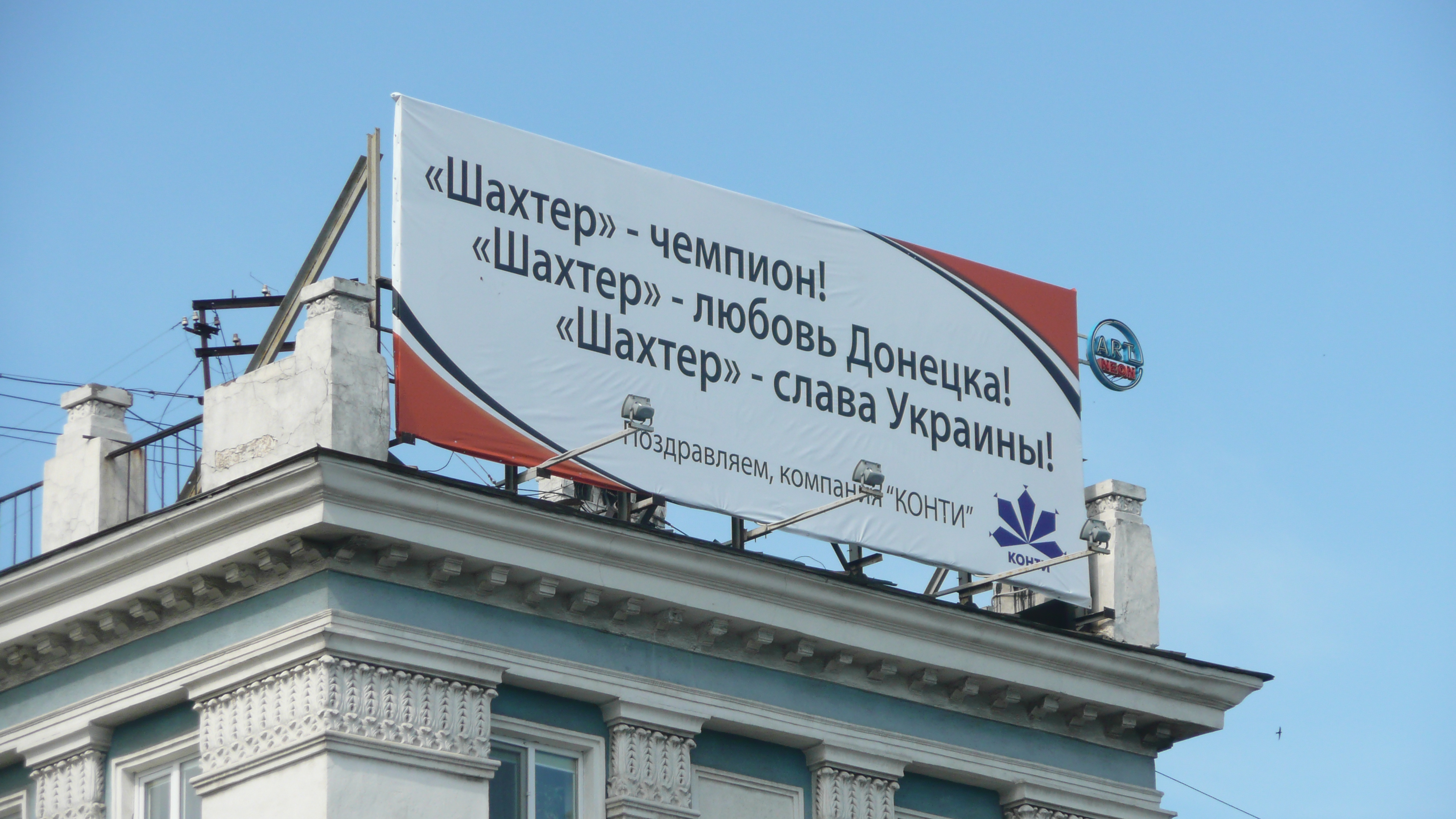
A public billboard in Donetsk in 2009, from the local "Konti" confectionary with compliments for the club

The first logo of the club was designed in 1936; it featured a blue hexagon, with a red 'S' in the middle, crossed over by a jackhammer. In 1946, when the club was renamed, the logo was changed to black and white, with the addition of the club's name. Later, in the middle of the 1960s, their logo depicted two crossed hammers, with "Shakhtar Donetsk" written in the circle. The crest was added to the kit and remained there, except for several seasons at the beginning of the 1990s. The club's name was depicted in the Russian language until the latest logo was chosen. Therefore, some sources have their name written often as "Shakhter" or rarely "Shakhtyor."

In 1989, an artist, Viktor Savilov, on the occasion of the club restructuring, offered a draft variant of a logo with elements of the ball and a pitch. Sometime later, the logo was remodelled into the present one. The emblem was added to the kit in 1997.

In 2007, during the presentation of the club's new stadium, Shakhtar's new logo was unveiled. For the first time in over 30 years, the crossed hammers, the traditional symbols of the club, were present on the crest. Also, for the first time, the name was written in the Ukrainian language and not Russian.

Since 1961, the official colours have been black and orange.

=== Kit suppliers and shirt sponsors ===
Period	Kit manufacturer	Shirt sponsor
1992–98	Adidas	Carlsberg
1998–05	Adidas	DCC
2005–06	Adidas	Lifecell
2006–07	Adidas	SCM
2008–21	Nike	SCM
2021–	Puma	SCM

== Supporters and rivalries ==
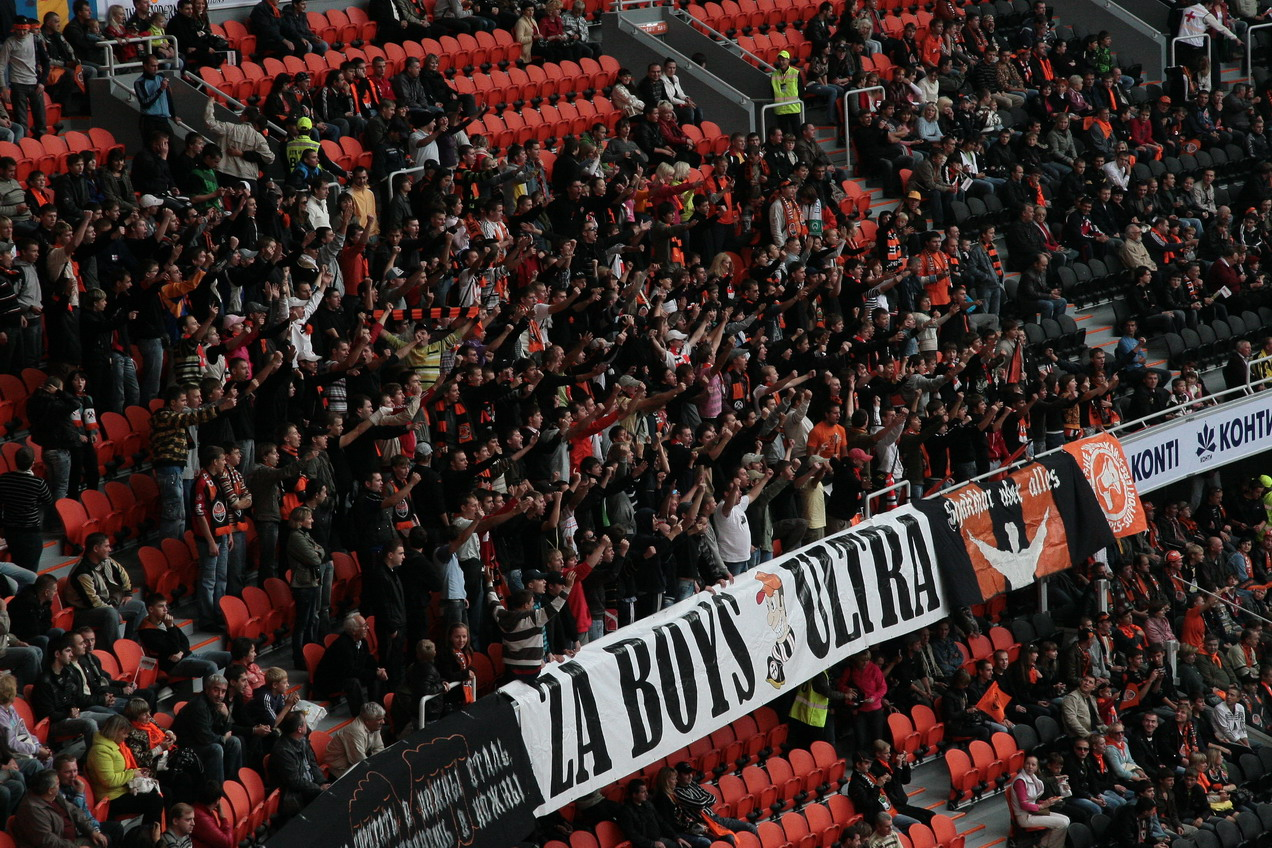
Shakhtar ultras at the Donbas Arena

The first riots associated with Shakhtar fans took place on 20 September 1959 in the match against CSKA Moscow, when several dozen Shakhtar supporters ran onto the field, and as a result the match was frustrated. In all matches involving Donetsk, many people came that promoted the development of fan movement in Donetsk. Active development of football movement began in the early 1980s. In the early 2000s to the Ukrainian stadiums came English style – hooliganism. In 2003, during the final of the Ukrainian Cup there was a fierce fight between Dynamo and Shakhtar fans.

The other rivalry was with Metalurh Donetsk. This was another local club and, although not as significant as games against the rivals from the capital, the games between the two Donetsk teams were proclaimed the Donetsk derby. Metalurh went bankrupt in July 2015.

Among the extinguished rivalries are the games against Spartak Moscow and, particularly, the third place champions Dinamo Tbilisi of Georgia that took place at times during the Soviet Top League. Another interesting rivalry, the Donbas Derby, is with Zorya Luhansk, which gathered a significant crowd in Luhansk. During the early Ukrainian championships, another interesting rivalry developed with Chornomorets Odesa labelled the "Miners vs. Sailors", which declined with the turn of the millennium due to the inconsistent performance of the Odesa-based club.

== Honours ==
=== Ukrainian competitions ===
- Ukrainian Premier League
  - Winners (16): 2001–02, 2004–05, 2005–06, 2007–08, 2009–10, 2010–11, 2011–12, 2012–13, 2013–14, 2016–17, 2017–18, 2018–19, 2019–20, 2022–23, 2023–24, 2025–26
  - runner-up (13): 1993–94, 1996–97, 1997–98, 1998–99, 1999–2000, 2000–01, 2002–03, 2003–04, 2006–07, 2008–09, 2014–15, 2015–16, 2020–21
- Ukrainian Cup
  - Winners (15, record): 1994–95, 1996–97, 2000–01, 2001–02, 2003–04, 2007–08, 2010–11, 2011–12, 2012–13, 2015–16, 2016–17, 2017–18, 2018–19, 2023–24, 2024–25
  - runner-up (6): 2002–03, 2004–05, 2006–07, 2008–09, 2013–14, 2014–15
- Ukrainian Super Cup
  - Winners (9, record): 2005, 2008, 2010, 2012, 2013, 2014, 2015, 2017, 2021
  - runner-up (8): 2004, 2006, 2007, 2011, 2016, 2018, 2019, 2020

=== European competitions ===
- UEFA Cup
  - Winners (1): 2008–09
- UEFA Super Cup
  - runner-up (1): 2009

=== Soviet competitions ===
- Soviet Top League
  - runner-up (2): 1975, 1979
- Soviet Cup
  - Winners (4): 1961, 1962, 1980, 1983
  - runner-up (4): 1963, 1978, 1985, 1986
- Soviet First League
  - Winners (1): 1954
  - runner-up (1): 1972
- Season's Cup (unofficial tournament as Super Cup)
  - Winners (1): 1984
  - runner-up (2): 1981,1986
- Cup of the Ukrainian SSR
  - runner-up (1): 1972

=== Invitational ===
- IFA Shield (IFA) (Note: Fourth oldest club competition, organized by the IFA (W.B.) and played between local clubs of West Bengal and other invited ones.) : Runners-up (1985)

=== UEFA club coefficient ranking ===
As of 31 December 2025

Rank	Team	Points
43	(France) Marseille	54.000
44	(France) Lyon	53.750
45	(Denmark) Copenhagen	53.375
46	(Ukraine) Shakhtar Donetsk	49.750
47	(Turkey) Galatasaray	47.750
48	(Belgium) Union SG	46.000
49	(Portugal) Braga	46.000

=== UEFA Rankings since 2004 ===
As of 31 December 2025

Season	Ranking	Movement	Points	Change
2025–26	46	▼ -5	49.750	▼ -2.250
2024–25	41	▼ -14	52.000	▼ -11.000
2023–24	27	▼ -2	63.000	0.000
2022–23	25	▼ -3	63.000	▼ -8.000
2021–22	22	▼ -4	71.000	▼ -8.000
2020–21	18	▼ -6	79.000	▼ -6.000
2019–20	12	▲ +4	85.000	▲ +5.000
2018–19	16	▼ -2	80.000	▼ -1.000
2017–18	14	▲ +4	81.000	▲ +2.000
2016–17	18	▲ +3	79.000	▲ +6.000
2015–16	21	▼ -3	73.000	▼ -4.000
2014–15	18	0	77.000	▲ +7.000
2013–14	18	▼ -5	70.000	▼ -15.000
2012–13	13	▲ +3	85.000	▲ +10.000
2011–12	16	▼ -2	75.000	▼ -4.000
2010–11	14	▲ +2	79.000	▲ +13.000
2009–10	16	0	66.000	0.000
2008–09	16	▲ +30	66.000	▲ +26.000
2007–08	46	▲ +3	40.000	▲ +5.000
2006–07	49	▲ +20	35.000	▲ +10.000
2005–06	69	▲ +11	25.000	▲ +5.000
2004–05	80	0	20.000	0.000

=== Football Club Elo ranking ===
As of 16 August 2026

Rank	Team	Points
133	(Germany) Hamburger SV	1667
134	(Turkey) Beşiktaş	1667
135	(Italy) US Sassuolo	1667
136	(Ukraine) Shakhtar Donetsk	1667
137	(Russia) CSKA Moscow	1667
138	(Croatia) Dinamo Zagreb	1665
139	(Mexico) UANL Tigres	1664

=== Friendly competitions ===
- Channel One Cup: 2006
- La Manga Cup: 2008
- Uhrencup: 2009
- Copa del Sol: 2010, 2013
- Salzburgerland Cup: 2011
- United Tournament/United Supercup: 2014
- Trofeo Bortolotti: 2015
- IFA Shield (IFA) (Note: Fourth oldest club competition, organized by the IFA (W.B.) and played between local clubs of West Bengal and other invited ones.) runners-up: 1985

=== Team awards ===
- Special award from the IFFHS for making the biggest progress of the decade, 2011.

=== Individual player awards ===
Several players have won individual awards during or for their time with Shakhtar Donetsk.

Soviet Footballer of the Year

- (Soviet Union) Vitaliy Starukhin (1979)

Footballer of the Year in Baltic and Commonwealth of Independent States

- (Armenia) Henrikh Mkhitaryan (2012)

Ukrainian Footballer of the Year

- (Soviet Union) Viktor Fomin (1950)
- (Soviet Union) Aleksandr Ponomarev (1951)
- (Soviet Union) Vitaliy Starukhin (1979)
- (Ukraine) Anatoliy Tymoshchuk (2002, 2006, 2007)
- (Ukraine) Mykhailo Mudryk (2022)

Ukraine Premier League MVP

As awarded by the Komanda newspaper

- (Ukraine) Andriy Vorobey (2000)
- (Ukraine) Anatoliy Tymoshchuk (2002)
- (Ukraine) Andriy Pyatov (2010)
- (Armenia) Henrikh Mkhitaryan (2012)
- (Brazil) Alex Teixeira (2015)
- (Brazil) (Ukraine) Marlos (2016–18)
- (Brazil) Taison (2019)

Armenian Footballer of the Year

- (Armenia) Henrikh Mkhitaryan (2011, 2012)

Polish Footballer of the Year

- (Poland) Mariusz Lewandowski (2009)

Soviet Goalkeeper of the Year

- (Soviet Union) Yuriy Dehteryov (1977)

Club Loyalty Award

- (Soviet Union) Mykhaylo Sokolovskyi (1987)

Romania Coach of the Year

- (Romania) Mircea Lucescu (2004, 2010, 2012, 2014)

== Players ==
=== Current squad ===
As of 26 August 2026

Note: Flags indicate national team as defined under FIFA eligibility rules; some limited exceptions apply. Players may hold more than one non-FIFA nationality.

No.	Pos.	Nation	Player
2	FW	BFA	Lassina Traoré
4	DF	BRA	Marlon Santos
5	DF	UKR	Valeriy Bondar (vice-captain)
6	MF	BRA	Marlon Gomes
7	FW	BRA	Eguinaldo
8	MF	UKR	Dmytro Kryskiv
9	FW	BRA	Kauã Elias
10	MF	BRA	Pedrinho
11	MF	BRA	Newerton
13	DF	BRA	Pedro Henrique
14	MF	BRA	Isaque
16	DF	GEO	Irakli Azarovi
17	DF	BRA	Vinicius Tobias
18	DF	TUN	Alaa Ghram
20	DF	UKR	Oleksandr Karavayev
22	DF	UKR	Mykola Matviyenko (captain)

No.	Pos.	Nation	Player
23	GK	UKR	Kiril Fesyun
24	MF	UKR	Viktor Tsukanov
25	FW	BRA	Gabriel Carvalho (on loan from Al Qadsiah)
27	MF	UKR	Oleh Ocheretko
28	DF	URU	Alan Matturro
29	MF	UKR	Yehor Nazaryna
30	FW	BRA	Alisson
31	GK	UKR	Dmytro Riznyk
37	MF	BRA	Lucas Ferreira
48	GK	UKR	Denys Tvardovskyi
49	FW	BRA	Luca Meirelles
68	FW	NGR	Prosper Obah
71	FW	BRA	Ryan Roberto
77	MF	VEN	Gleiker Mendoza
99	FW	BRA	Bruninho

=== Other players under contract ===
Note: Flags indicate national team as defined under FIFA eligibility rules; some limited exceptions apply. Players may hold more than one non-FIFA nationality.

No.	Pos.	Nation	Player
—	GK	UKR	Tymur Puzankov
—	DF	UKR	Viktor Korniyenko

No.	Pos.	Nation	Player
—	MF	UKR	Maryan Shved

=== Out on loan ===
Note: Flags indicate national team as defined under FIFA eligibility rules; some limited exceptions apply. Players may hold more than one non-FIFA nationality.

No.	Pos.	Nation	Player
—	DF	BOL	Diego Arroyo (at (Israel) Hapoel Petah Tikva until 30 June 2027)
—	DF	UKR	Maryan Faryna (at Chornomorets Odesa until 30 June 2027)
—	DF	GEO	Giorgi Gocholeishvili (at (Spain) Cádiz until 30 June 2027)
—	DF	UKR	Eduard Kozik (at Kolos Kovalivka until 30 June 2027)
—	DF	GEO	Luka Latsabidze (at (Georgia (country)) Torpedo Kutaisi until 30 June 2027)
—	DF	UKR	Roman Savchenko (at Lokomotyv Kyiv until 30 June 2027)
—	DF	UKR	Danylo Udod (at (Kyrgyzstan) Dordoi Bishkek until 31 December 2026)

No.	Pos.	Nation	Player
—	MF	UKR	Artem Bondarenko (at (Saudi Arabia) Al-Ahli until 30 June 2027)
—	MF	UKR	Anton Hlushchenko (at Zorya Luhansk until 30 June 2027)
—	MF	UKR	Ivan Losenko (at (Canada) CF Montréal until 30 June 2027)
—	MF	UKR	Mykola Oharkov (at Kudrivka until 30 June 2027)
—	MF	UKR	Kyrylo Siheyev (at Kudrivka until 30 June 2027)
—	FW	TJK	Khusrav Toirov (at (Tajikistan) Ravshan Kulob until 30 November 2026)
—	FW	UKR	Oleksandr Yushchenko (at Kudrivka until 30 June 2027)

=== Retired numbers ===
No.	Player	Nationality	Position	Shakhtar debut	Last match	Ref
33	Darijo Srna	Croatia	Right back	12 July 2003	13 September 2017	

== Coaches and administration ==
Administration	Coaching (senior team)	Coaching (U-19 team)
President – (Ukraine) Rinat Akhmetov; General director – (Ukraine) Serhiy Palkin; Director of Football – (Croatia) Darijo Srna; Commercial director – (Ukraine) Dmytro Kyrylenko; Financial director – (Ukraine) Hyulnara Akhmedzhanova	Head coach – (Turkey) Arda Turan; Assistant manager – (Turkey) Kerem Yavaş; Assistant head coach – (Italy) Carlo Nicolini; Assistant head coach – (Turkey) Sinan Sarıkurt; Assistant head coach – (Turkey) Murat Özkütükçü; Analysts – (Turkey) Mert Somay; Fitness coach – (Turkey) Utku Alemdaroğlu; Fitness coach – (Ukraine) Ivan Bashtovyi; Goalkeeping coach – (Turkey) Emrah Karakovan; Goalkeeping coach – (Ukraine) Andriy Pyatov	Senior coach – (Ukraine) Oleksiy Byelik; Assistant coach – (Ukraine) Maksym Malyshev; Assistant coach – (Ukraine) Oleksandr Alimov; Goalkeeping coach – (Ukraine) Oleh Shevchenko

== Presidents, owners, and other officials ==
=== Ownership (Soviet period) ===
- Trade Union Committee of the Gorky Coal Mine, Donetsk

=== Presidents ===
- 1989–1994: Ivan Haivoronskyi
- 1994–1995: Akhat Bragin
- 1996–present: Rinat Akhmetov

=== Chairmen of the Board ===
- 1990–1992: Oleksandr Kosevych (chair of the board)
- 2006–present: Oleh Popov (chair of council of directors)

=== Vice Presidents ===
- 1994–1995: Ivan Haivoronskyi
- 1994–2000: Ravil Safiullin
- 1998–present: Borys Kolesnikov

=== General directors ===
- 2004–present: Serhiy Palkin (financial director in 2003–2004)

=== Director of Football ===
- 2020–present: (Croatia) Darijo Srna

== Player records ==
=== Top goalscorers ===
As of 21 May 2016

#	Name	Years	League	Cup	Europe	Other	Total
1	(Brazil) Luiz Adriano	2007–2015	77	16	32	3	128
2	(Ukraine) Andriy Vorobey	1998–2007	80	22	12	0	114
3	(Soviet Union) Vitaliy Starukhin	1973–1981	84	23	3	0	110
4	(Soviet Union) Mykhaylo Sokolovskyi	1974–1987	87	11	5	2	105
5	(Brazil) Brandão	2002–2008	65	11	15	0	91
6	(Brazil) Alex Teixeira	2010–2016	67	10	12	0	89
7	(Ukraine) Ihor Petrov	1982–1991; 1994–1996; 1998	70	12	2	0	84
8	(Soviet Union) (Ukraine) Serhiy Atelkin	1990–1995; 1996–1997; 2000–2002	61	9	12	0	82
9	(Soviet Union) (Ukraine) Viktor Hrachov	1980–1981; 1982–1990; 1994	65	10	5	0	80
10	(Ukraine) Oleh Matvyeyev	1992–1995; 1996–2000	61	16	1	0	78

- Other – National Super Cup

=== Most appearances ===
As of match played 30 January 2025

#	Name	Years	League	Cup	Europe	Other	Total
1	(Croatia) Darijo Srna	2003–2018	339	48	137	12	536
2	(Soviet Union) Mykhaylo Sokolovskyi	1974–1987	400	63	18	4	485
3	(Ukraine) Andriy Pyatov	2007–2023	301	39	131	11	482
4	(Ukraine) Serhiy Yashchenko	1982–1995	384	51	8	1	444
5	(Ukraine) Taras Stepanenko	2010–2025	289	35	105	11	440
6	(Soviet Union) Yuriy Dehteryov	1967–1983	321	47	10	0	378
7	(Ukraine) Dmytro Shutkov	1991–2008	267	56	24	0	347
8	(Soviet Union) Valeriy Rudakov	1974–1986	277	44	16	3	340
9	(Soviet Union) Valeriy Yaremchenko	1966–1978	297	32	8	0	337
10	(Ukraine) Viktor Hrachov	1980–1981; 1982–1990; 1994	282	40	6	3	331

- Other – National Super Cup

== Notable coaches ==
Years	Name	Trophies
1952–56	(Soviet Union) Aleksandr Ponomarev	1 Soviet First League
1960–69	(Soviet Union) Oleg Oshenkov	2 Soviet Cup
1979–85	(Soviet Union) Viktor Nosov	2 Soviet Cup; 1 USSR Super Cup
1995	(Russia) Vladimir Salkov	1 Ukrainian Cup
1 August 1996 – 30 March 1999	(Ukraine) Valeriy Yaremchenko	1 Ukrainian Cup
30 November 1999 – 12 October 2001	(Ukraine) Viktor Prokopenko	1 Ukrainian Cup
1 January 2002 – 18 September 2002	(Italy) Nevio Scala	1 Ukrainian Premier League; 1 Ukrainian Cup
17 May 2004 – 21 May 2016	(Romania) Mircea Lucescu	8 Ukrainian Premier League; 6 Ukrainian Cup; 7 Ukrainian Super Cup; 1 UEFA Cup
31 May 2016 – 11 June 2019	(Portugal) Paulo Fonseca	3 Ukrainian Premier League; 3 Ukrainian Cup; 1 Ukrainian Super Cup
12 June 2019 – 12 May 2021	(Portugal) Luís Castro	1 Ukrainian Premier League
22 September 2021 – 11 July 2022	(Italy) Roberto De Zerbi	1 Ukrainian Super Cup
14 July 2022 – 8 June 2023	(Croatia) Igor Jovićević	1 Ukrainian Premier League
24 October 2023 – 24 May 2025	(Croatia) Marino Pušić	1 Ukrainian Premier League; 2 Ukrainian Cup
27 May 2025 – Present	(Turkey) Arda Turan	1 Ukrainian Premier League

== League and Cup history ==
Tier	Years	Last	Promotions	Relegations
Top League (tier 1)	44	1991	5 times to Europe	▼3 (1971)
First League (tier 2)	7	1972	▲3 (1972)	never
Group V (tier 3)	3	1937	▲1 (1937)	never
56 years of professional football in Soviet Union since 1936

Tier	Years	Last	Promotions	Relegations
Premier League (tier 1)	35	2025–26	30 times to Europe	never
35 years of professional national football in Ukraine since 1992

== European history ==
Shakhtar Donetsk has participated in European competition since 1976, playing its first game against Berliner FC Dynamo in the UEFA Cup. Since 1997, the club has participated in UEFA competition annually with variable amounts of success, and first took part in the UEFA Champions League competition in 2000. Shakhtar Donetsk played against Arsenal, Lazio and Sparta Prague upon qualifying for the group stage for the first time in 2000–01.

Season	Achievement	Notes
UEFA Super Cup
2009	Runners-up	defeated by (Spain) Barcelona 0–1 in Monaco
European Cup / UEFA Champions League
2010–11	Quarter-finals	eliminated by (Spain) Barcelona 1–5 in Barcelona, 0–1 in Donetsk
UEFA Cup Winners' Cup
1983–84	Quarter-finals	eliminated by (Portugal) Porto 2–3 in Porto, 1–1 in Donetsk
UEFA Cup / UEFA Europa League
2008–09	Winners	defeated (Germany) Werder Bremen 2–1 in Istanbul
2015–16	Semi-finals	eliminated by (Spain) Sevilla 1–3 in Seville, 2–2 in Lviv
2019–20	Semi-finals	eliminated by (Italy) Inter Milan 0–5 in Düsseldorf
UEFA Conference League
2025–26	Semi-finals	eliminated by (England) Crystal Palace 1–3 in Kraków, 1–2 in London

== See also ==
- MFC Shakhtar Donetsk
