= Serhiy Palkin =

Ukrainian football administrator (born 1974)

- Сергій Палкін
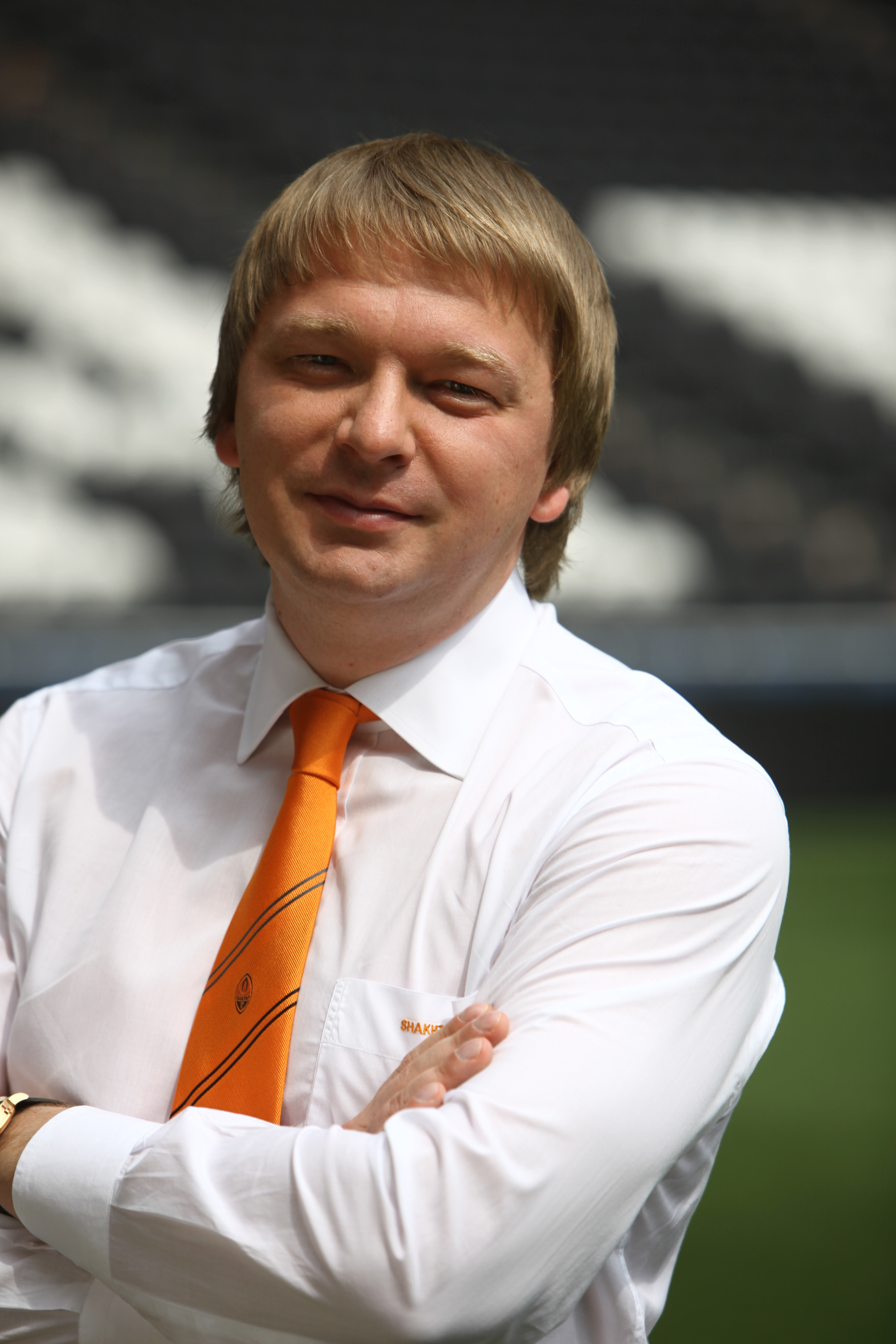
- Serhiy Palkin in 2010
- Born: Serhiy Anatoliiovych Palkin; 22 October 1974 (age 52); Kryvyi Rih, Ukrainian SSR, Soviet Union
- Known for: General director, Shakhtar Donetsk
- Awards: ; Order of Merit (2nd and 3rd class)

Serhiy Anatoliiovych Palkin (Ukrainian: Сергій Анатолійович Палкін; born 22 October 1974) is a Ukrainian football administrator, who works as the general director of Shakhtar Donetsk.

== Career ==
Serhiy Palkin is graduated from the National Academy of Management in Kyiv.

From 1997 to 2001 he worked as a Senior Accountant for Coopers & Lybrand JV (later, the company was renamed PricewaterhouseCoopers Ltd). In July 2001 Palkin was appointed Deputy CEO for Budgeting & Economics at Kryvyi Rih Cement & Mining Plant JSC, being promoted to the Economics & Finance Director post in 2002. After that, on 3 June 2003 he joined Shakhtar CJSC in the CFO capacity, being appointed as the club CEO on 18 June 2004.

Palkin criticized Russia's invasion of Ukraine and its impact on the country's Premier League. In February 2026, he protested FIFA's consideration to remove Russia's suspension (effective since February 2022) from official football events.

== Awards ==
- 2009: Companion of Order of Merit of grade III
- 2011: Order of Merit of grade II
