= 1975 Soviet Top League =

38th season of top-tier football league in Soviet Union

Soviet Top League
- Season: 1975

The 1975 season of the Soviet Top League proved that Dynamo Kyiv was at the moment unbeatable for other Soviet clubs. Besides that, the Ukrainian club was one of the strongest on the international arena, winning the UEFA Cup Winners Cup the same year. Another Ukrainian club, Shakhtar from Donetsk, took the second place.

== Final league table ==
Pos	Team	Pld	W	D	L	GF	GA	GD	Pts	Qualification or relegation
1	(Ukrainian Soviet Socialist Republic) Dynamo Kyiv (C)	30	17	9	4	53	30	+23	43	Qualification for European Cup first round
2	(Ukrainian Soviet Socialist Republic) Shakhtar Donetsk	30	15	8	7	45	23	+22	38	Qualification for UEFA Cup first round
3	(Russian Soviet Federative Socialist Republic) Dynamo Moscow	30	13	12	5	39	23	+16	38	Qualification for UEFA Cup first round
4	(Russian Soviet Federative Socialist Republic) Torpedo Moscow	30	13	8	9	42	33	+9	34	
5	(Armenian Soviet Socialist Republic) Ararat Yerevan	30	15	4	11	40	38	+2	34	
6	(Ukrainian Soviet Socialist Republic) Karpaty Lviv	30	11	10	9	36	28	+8	32	
7	(Ukrainian Soviet Socialist Republic) Dnipro Dnipropetrovsk	30	10	11	9	33	30	+3	31	
8	(Georgian Soviet Socialist Republic) Dinamo Tbilisi	30	11	9	10	32	32	0	31	Qualification for Cup Winners' Cup first round
9	(Ukrainian Soviet Socialist Republic) Zarya Voroshilovgrad	30	10	11	9	32	37	−5	31	
10	(Russian Soviet Federative Socialist Republic) Spartak Moscow	30	9	10	11	27	30	−3	28	
11	(Russian Soviet Federative Socialist Republic) Lokomotiv Moscow	30	7	12	11	28	33	−5	26	
12	(Ukrainian Soviet Socialist Republic) Chornomorets Odessa	30	8	10	12	27	35	−8	26	
13	(Russian Soviet Federative Socialist Republic) CSKA Moscow	30	6	13	11	29	36	−7	25	
14	(Russian Soviet Federative Socialist Republic) Zenit Leningrad	30	7	10	13	27	42	−15	24	
15	(Uzbek Soviet Socialist Republic) Pakhtakor Tashkent (R)	30	8	7	15	31	44	−13	23	Relegation to First League
16	(Russian Soviet Federative Socialist Republic) SKA Rostov-on-Don (R)	30	4	8	18	23	50	−27	16	Relegation to First League

Source: rsssf.com
(C) Champions; (R) Relegated

== Results ==
Home \ Away	ARA	CHO	CSK	DNI	DYK	DYN	DTB	KAR	LOK	PAK	SHA	SKA	SPA	TOR	ZAR	ZEN
Ararat Yerevan		1–0	2–1	3–0	2–3	3–5	1–0	1–0	2–0	2–0	1–0	2–2	2–1	2–0	2–0	4–2
Chornomorets Odessa	1–1		0–0	2–0	1–0	1–1	2–1	2–2	1–0	1–1	2–1	1–1	0–0	0–0	1–0	1–2
CSKA Moscow	0–1	0–0		3–3	1–1	1–1	0–0	2–2	1–0	2–1	1–0	1–1	1–3	1–1	4–0	1–0
Dnipro Dnipropetrovsk	1–0	4–1	2–0		1–1	2–0	0–0	1–1	2–0	1–1	1–1	3–0	1–0	2–1	2–1	1–1
Dynamo Kyiv	4–0	1–0	3–0	1–0		1–0	3–1	2–2	3–2	0–1	3–1	2–0	3–1	3–0	3–0	3–2
Dynamo Moscow	1–0	1–0	1–1	0–0	2–1		2–3	1–0	2–2	3–0	1–0	1–0	2–1	1–1	0–0	1–1
Dinamo Tbilisi	2–1	1–0	1–0	2–0	1–1	1–1		1–0	0–0	0–0	3–1	1–1	1–0	2–0	2–3	0–1
Karpaty Lviv	2–0	3–1	2–0	1–0	2–2	0–1	3–2		0–0	2–0	0–0	3–0	2–0	1–0	0–0	1–0
Lokomotiv Moscow	4–1	2–2	1–1	1–1	1–1	0–1	1–1	1–0		4–1	0–0	1–0	0–0	0–1	0–1	1–0
Pakhtakor Tashkent	1–0	2–1	1–3	1–0	5–0	0–2	0–1	1–1	2–2		0–2	4–2	0–0	2–1	1–2	3–0
Shakhtar Donetsk	3–0	1–0	2–0	2–2	0–1	1–0	3–1	2–0	2–0	1–0		4–0	1–0	4–2	2–2	5–0
SKA Rostov-on-Don	3–2	0–2	0–0	1–2	0–2	1–0	1–2	0–1	0–1	3–1	1–3		0–0	1–3	0–1	1–1
Spartak Moscow	0–0	3–1	2–1	1–0	0–1	0–0	2–0	2–1	4–2	2–0	1–1	0–0		0–3	0–0	2–2
Torpedo Moscow	1–1	0–1	3–2	2–1	2–2	1–1	1–0	2–1	2–0	4–1	0–0	1–2	4–0		2–1	2–0
Zarya Voroshilovgrad	0–1	3–1	1–0	2–0	1–1	0–6	2–2	1–1	1–1	1–1	1–1	3–1	1–0	1–2		3–0
Zenit Leningrad	1–2	3–1	1–1	0–0	1–1	1–1	2–0	3–2	0–1	1–0	0–1	2–1	0–2	0–0	0–0	

Legend: Blue = home team win; Yellow = draw; Red = away team win.

== Top scorers ==
18 goals

- Oleg Blokhin (Dynamo Kyiv)

13 goals

- Boris Kopeikin (CSKA Moscow)

12 goals

- Vladimir Danilyuk (Karpaty)
- David Kipiani (Dinamo Tbilisi)
- Viktor Kolotov (Dynamo Kyiv)

11 goals

- Mykhaylo Sokolovsky (Shakhtar)

10 goals

- Arkady Andreasyan (Ararat)
- Roman Khizhak (Karpaty)
- Eduard Markarov (Ararat)

9 goals

- Vitali Starukhin (Shakhtar)

== Attendances ==
No.	Club	Average
1	Dynamo Kyiv	44,867
2	Shakhtar Donetsk	32,600
3	Spartak Moscow	27,269
4	Ararat	25,133
5	Dinamo Tbilisi	25,067
6	Paxtakor	24,800
7	Karpaty	24,800
8	Zenit	24,133
9	Dynamo Moscow	23,327
10	PFC CSKA	21,533
11	Dnipro	20,800
12	Chornomorets	20,600
13	Zorya	19,400
14	Torpedo Moscow	18,067
15	Lokomotiv Moscow	13,000
16	Rostov-on-Don	8,467
