= 1977 Soviet Top League =

40th season of top-tier football league in Soviet Union

Soviet Top League
- Season: 1977
- Champions: Dinamo Kiev
- Relegated: Karpaty Lvov, Krylya Sovetov Kuibyshev
- European Cup: Dinamo Kiev
- Cup Winners' Cup: Shakhter Donetsk
- UEFA Cup: Dinamo Tbilisi; Torpedo Moscow
- Matches: 240
- Goals: 486 (2.03 per match)
- Top goalscorer: (17) Oleg Blokhin (Dinamo K.)

Statistics of Soviet Top League for the 1977 season.

== Overview ==
It was contested by 16 teams, and Dynamo Kyiv won the championship.

== League standings ==
Pos	Team	Pld	W	D	L	GF	GA	GD	Pts	Qualification or relegation
1	(Ukrainian Soviet Socialist Republic) Dynamo Kyiv (C)	30	14	15	1	51	12	+39	43	Qualification for European Cup first round
2	(Georgian Soviet Socialist Republic) Dinamo Tbilisi	30	13	13	4	43	26	+17	39	Qualification for UEFA Cup first round
3	(Russian Soviet Federative Socialist Republic) Torpedo Moscow	30	12	13	5	30	23	+7	37	Qualification for UEFA Cup first round
4	(Russian Soviet Federative Socialist Republic) Dynamo Moscow	30	9	17	4	34	20	+14	35	
5	(Ukrainian Soviet Socialist Republic) Shakhtar Donetsk	30	9	16	5	31	24	+7	34	Qualification for Cup Winners' Cup first round
6	(Russian Soviet Federative Socialist Republic) Lokomotiv Moscow	30	9	14	7	27	25	+2	32	
7	(Ukrainian Soviet Socialist Republic) Chornomorets Odessa	30	11	8	11	33	41	−8	30	
8	(Kazakh Soviet Socialist Republic) Kairat Alma-Ata	30	6	17	7	26	31	−5	29	
9	(Ukrainian Soviet Socialist Republic) Zaria Voroshilovgrad	30	8	12	10	28	24	+4	28	
10	(Russian Soviet Federative Socialist Republic) Zenit Leningrad	30	8	12	10	34	33	+1	28	
11	(Armenian Soviet Socialist Republic) Ararat Yerevan	30	7	13	10	28	34	−6	27	
12	(Ukrainian Soviet Socialist Republic) Dnipro Dnipropetrovsk	30	9	9	12	24	31	−7	27	
13	(Azerbaijan Soviet Socialist Republic) Neftchi Baku	30	5	17	8	25	34	−9	27	
14	(Russian Soviet Federative Socialist Republic) CSKA Moscow	30	5	17	8	28	39	−11	27	
15	(Ukrainian Soviet Socialist Republic) Karpaty Lviv (R)	30	6	14	10	26	30	−4	26	Relegation to First League
16	(Russian Soviet Federative Socialist Republic) Krylya Sovetov Kuibyshev (R)	30	2	7	21	18	59	−41	11	Relegation to First League

(C) Champions; (R) Relegated

== Results ==
Home \ Away	ARA	CHO	CSK	DNI	DYK	DYN	DTB	KAI	KAR	KRY	LOK	NEF	SHA	TOR	ZAR	ZEN
Ararat Yerevan		1–1	2–3	1–0	0–2	0–2	2–0	0–0	1–0	3–0	1–0	1–1	1–1	1–1	2–0	2–2
Chornomorets Odessa	1–0		2–1	1–2	1–1	2–0	2–1	1–0	2–0	3–0	0–1	2–2	1–0	0–0	1–0	1–0
CSKA Moscow	0–0	1–1		2–1	0–1	3–2	0–0	2–1	1–2	0–1	1–1	0–0	0–0	2–2	1–1	0–0
Dnipro Dnipropetrovsk	2–1	1–1	2–3		1–0	0–1	0–2	0–0	1–0	1–0	0–0	3–0	0–1	2–0	1–1	0–0
Dynamo Kyiv	3–0	8–0	4–0	4–0		0–0	2–0	4–0	1–1	0–0	3–0	2–0	2–0	3–1	1–1	2–0
Dynamo Moscow	1–1	2–0	4–0	0–0	1–1		1–1	0–0	0–0	5–0	0–2	2–1	1–1	1–1	1–0	0–0
Dinamo Tbilisi	1–0	3–3	2–2	5–1	0–0	1–1		2–0	3–1	4–2	1–0	4–1	1–0	2–0	0–0	0–0
Kairat Alma-Ata	0–0	2–1	2–1	0–0	1–1	2–2	1–1		1–1	1–0	3–3	1–0	0–0	1–1	0–1	4–3
Karpaty Lviv	2–0	1–2	1–1	1–0	1–1	1–1	0–1	0–0		2–1	0–0	2–2	1–1	0–0	1–0	1–2
Krylya Sovetov Kuibyshev	1–2	2–1	0–0	1–3	0–1	0–2	0–1	1–4	1–1		1–1	1–1	3–3	0–1	0–2	1–3
Lokomotiv Moscow	1–1	2–1	1–1	1–0	0–0	1–0	1–1	0–0	0–3	2–1		0–0	0–0	1–2	2–0	3–0
Neftçi Baku	1–1	1–0	1–1	1–1	1–1	0–0	1–1	1–1	2–0	1–0	0–0		1–1	1–1	1–0	3–2
Shakhtar Donetsk	1–0	0–0	1–1	1–0	0–0	0–0	1–1	3–0	3–2	3–0	2–2	1–0		2–0	2–2	3–2
Torpedo Moscow	1–1	1–0	0–0	2–0	1–1	2–2	3–2	1–0	1–0	3–0	1–0	0–0	2–0		0–1	1–0
Zaria Voroshilovgrad	2–0	4–1	0–0	0–1	1–1	0–0	0–1	1–1	1–1	4–0	1–0	4–1	0–0	0–1		1–0
Zenit Leningrad	4–1	4–1	4–1	1–1	1–1	0–2	1–1	0–0	0–0	1–1	1–2	1–0	1–0	0–0	1–0	

Legend: Blue = home team win; Yellow = draw; Red = away team win.

== Top scorers ==
17 goals

- Oleg Blokhin (Dynamo Kyiv)

14 goals

- David Kipiani (Dinamo Tbilisi)

12 goals

- Yuri Chesnokov (CSKA Moscow)

10 goals

- Andrei Yakubik (Dynamo Moscow)

9 goals

- Yuri Reznik (Shakhtar)
- Nikolai Smolnikov (Neftchi)
- Vitali Starukhin (Shakhtar)

8 goals

- Revaz Chelebadze (Dinamo Tbilisi)
- Vladimir Klementyev (Zenit)

7 goals

- Yuri Dubrovny (Karpaty)
- Vladimir Kazachyonok (Dynamo Moscow)
- Boris Kopeikin (CSKA Moscow)
- Khoren Hovhannisyan (Ararat)
- Vyacheslav Semyonov (Zorya Voroshylovhrad)

== Attendances ==
No.	Club	Average
1	Dinamo Tbilisi	68,200
2	Zenit	27,667
3	Dynamo Kyiv	26,633
4	Ararat	26,000
5	Neftçhi	25,800
6	Kairat	24,200
7	Shakhtar Donetsk	21,533
8	Karpaty Lviv	18,867
9	Dnipro	18,533
10	Dynamo Moscow	17,667
11	Chornomorets	16,867
12	Torpedo	16,133
13	Krylia Sovetov	12,900
14	PFC CSKA	12,400
15	Zorya	11,567
16	Lokomotiv Moscow	7,467
