= 1979 Soviet Top League =

42nd season of top-tier football league in Soviet Union

Soviet Top League
- Season: 1979
- Champions: Spartak Moscow
- Relegated: Zaria Voroshilovgrad, Krylya Sovetov Kuibyshev
- European Cup: Spartak Moscow
- Cup Winners' Cup: Dinamo Tbilisi
- UEFA Cup: Dinamo Moscow; Dinamo Kiev; Shakhter Donetsk
- Matches: 306
- Goals: 758 (2.48 per match)
- Top goalscorer: (26) Vitaliy Starukhin (Shakhter)

Statistics of Soviet Top League for the 1979 season.

== Overview ==
1979 Top League was composed of 18 teams, the championship was won by Spartak Moscow.

On 11 August 1979, a mid-air collision killed virtually the entire FC Pakhtakor Tashkent team. The Top League ordered all the other teams to make three players available for a draft to restock the team, and Pakhtakor was given exemption from relegation for the next three years.

== League standings ==
Pos	Team	Pld	W	D	L	GF	GA	GD	Pts	Qualification or relegation
1	(Russian Soviet Federative Socialist Republic) Spartak Moscow (C)	34	21	10	3	66	25	+41	50 (Note: 2 points deducted (8 draw limit))	Qualification for European Cup first round
2	(Ukrainian Soviet Socialist Republic) Shakhtar Donetsk	34	20	8	6	57	33	+24	48	Qualification for UEFA Cup first round
3	(Ukrainian Soviet Socialist Republic) Dynamo Kyiv	34	21	5	8	51	26	+25	47	Qualification for UEFA Cup first round
4	(Georgian Soviet Socialist Republic) Dinamo Tbilisi	34	19	12	3	54	27	+27	46 (Note: 4 points deducted (8 draw limit))	Qualification for Cup Winners' Cup first round
5	(Russian Soviet Federative Socialist Republic) Dynamo Moscow	34	17	9	8	41	27	+14	42 (Note: 1 point deducted (8 draw limit))	Qualification for UEFA Cup first round
6	(Byelorussian Soviet Socialist Republic) Dinamo Minsk	34	15	6	13	48	38	+10	36	
7	(Armenian Soviet Socialist Republic) Ararat Yerevan	34	12	13	9	44	32	+12	32 (Note: 5 points deducted (8 draw limit))	
8	(Russian Soviet Federative Socialist Republic) CSKA Moscow	34	12	8	14	46	46	0	32	
9	(Uzbek Soviet Socialist Republic) Pakhtakor Tashkent	34	11	9	14	42	53	−11	30	
10	(Russian Soviet Federative Socialist Republic) Zenit Leningrad	34	11	9	14	41	45	−4	30	
11	(Ukrainian Soviet Socialist Republic) Chornomorets Odessa	34	10	11	13	32	37	−5	28 (Note: 3 points deducted (8 draw limit))	
12	(Russian Soviet Federative Socialist Republic) Lokomotiv Moscow	34	8	12	14	44	57	−13	24	
13	(Kazakh Soviet Socialist Republic) Kairat Alma-Ata	34	8	9	17	29	44	−15	24	
14	(Azerbaijan Soviet Socialist Republic) Neftchi Baku	34	8	8	18	29	50	−21	24	
15	(Russian Soviet Federative Socialist Republic) SKA Rostov-on-Don	34	8	14	12	37	50	−13	24 (Note: 6 points deducted (8 draw limit))	
16	(Russian Soviet Federative Socialist Republic) Torpedo Moscow	34	8	9	17	32	46	−14	24	
17	(Ukrainian Soviet Socialist Republic) Zaria Voroshilovgrad (R)	34	6	11	17	41	62	−21	20	Relegation to First League
18	(Russian Soviet Federative Socialist Republic) Krylya Sovetov Kuibyshev (R)	34	7	5	22	24	60	−36	19	Relegation to First League

(C) Champions; (R) Relegated

== Results ==
Home \ Away	ARA	CHO	CSK	DYK	DMN	DYN	DTB	KAI	KRY	LOK	NEF	PAK	SHA	SKA	SPA	TOR	ZAR	ZEN
Ararat Yerevan		2–0	2–1	3–1	4–1	0–0	0–0	4–2	0–0	2–2	0–0	3–1	1–1	2–0	2–0	1–1	0–0	1–1
Chornomorets Odessa	2–1		0–1	2–0	0–1	3–1	0–1	0–0	1–0	2–0	2–0	2–1	0–0	2–2	1–1	1–1	3–1	1–2
CSKA Moscow	1–3	3–0		0–1	1–2	0–0	2–0	4–0	1–0	0–3	2–1	1–1	0–0	2–2	2–5	1–2	2–1	1–1
Dynamo Kyiv	2–1	1–0	1–0		1–0	2–1	1–1	2–1	4–1	3–1	5–1	4–3	2–0	2–1	0–2	2–0	2–0	3–0
Dinamo Minsk	3–2	2–0	0–0	0–0		2–3	1–2	1–0	0–0	3–1	3–0	2–1	2–0	2–2	1–2	2–0	6–2	3–1
Dynamo Moscow	0–1	3–0	2–1	0–0	1–0		1–1	2–0	1–0	3–2	3–0	2–0	1–0	2–0	0–0	0–2	2–2	0–0
Dinamo Tbilisi	1–0	3–1	3–1	1–0	1–0	1–1		2–0	2–1	1–0	1–1	4–0	0–0	3–1	0–0	3–1	3–0	2–0
Kairat Alma-Ata	1–0	1–3	2–3	1–0	1–0	0–2	0–0		0–2	2–2	3–1	0–1	1–2	4–1	1–2	0–0	2–1	1–0
Krylya Sovetov Kuibyshev	0–3	1–1	1–0	0–1	1–4	2–0	1–3	2–1		0–4	0–1	1–1	0–3	2–1	0–5	1–0	1–0	0–2
Lokomotiv Moscow	2–1	0–0	1–1	1–2	1–1	0–1	4–2	2–2	2–1		0–0	1–1	1–1	5–0	1–8	1–0	1–2	1–1
Neftçi Baku	4–2	1–0	0–3	0–1	1–2	0–1	1–2	1–0	3–0	2–0		0–1	3–1	2–2	0–2	1–0	1–1	2–2
Pakhtakor Tashkent	0–1	0–1	1–1	1–0	2–0	1–2	2–1	1–2	3–2	2–0	0–0		1–1	1–1	1–1	2–1	3–1	2–1
Shakhtar Donetsk	2–0	1–1	3–2	1–0	1–0	2–0	3–3	1–0	3–2	4–1	2–0	3–0		3–0	2–0	2–0	2–1	3–1
SKA Rostov-on-Don	0–0	1–1	2–1	0–0	1–0	1–2	1–1	0–0	2–0	0–0	2–0	1–3	2–0		2–3	2–1	2–2	1–0
Spartak Moscow	1–0	1–1	4–1	1–0	3–1	2–1	1–1	0–0	1–0	4–0	3–0	1–1	3–1	0–0		0–1	3–1	3–1
Torpedo Moscow	1–1	0–0	1–2	0–4	1–2	0–3	1–1	0–0	2–0	1–2	1–0	6–2	1–2	1–0	1–1		1–0	1–2
Zaria Voroshilovgrad	1–1	2–1	0–3	1–1	0–0	0–0	1–3	1–1	1–1	2–2	1–0	4–1	3–5	1–2	1–2	4–2		1–2
Zenit Leningrad	0–0	2–0	1–2	1–3	2–1	2–0	0–1	1–0	4–1	2–0	2–2	2–1	1–2	2–2	0–1	1–1	1–2	

Legend: Blue = home team win; Yellow = draw; Red = away team win.

== Top scorers ==
26 goals

- Vitali Starukhin (Shakhtar)

17 goals

- Sergey Andreyev (SKA Rostov-on-Don)
- Oleg Blokhin (Dynamo Kyiv)
- Khoren Hovhannisyan (Ararat)
- Valeriy Petrakov (Lokomotiv Moscow)

16 goals

- Yuri Chesnokov (CSKA Moscow)
- Vladimir Kazachyonok (Zenit)

14 goals

- Aleksandr Prokopenko (Dinamo Minsk)
- Georgi Yartsev (Spartak Moscow)
- Nikolai Vasilyev (Torpedo Moscow)

== Attendances ==
No.	Club	Average
1	Dinamo Tbilisi	55,882
2	Shakhtar Donetsk	38,471
3	Spartak Moscow	30,588
4	Paxtakor	29,941
5	Dinamo Minsk	19,824
6	Chornomorets	19,353
7	Zenit	18,000
8	Rostov-on-Don	17,806
9	Neftçhi	16,412
10	Kairat	16,353
11	Dynamo Kyiv	15,706
12	Ararat	15,047
13	Krylia Sovetov	13,118
14	Zorya	11,118
15	Torpedo Moscow	10,647
16	PFC CSKA	10,471
17	Dynamo Moscow	10,147
18	Lokomotiv Moscow	4,735
