= 1981 Soviet Top League =

44th season of top-tier football league in Soviet Union

Soviet Top League
- Season: 1981
- Champions: Dinamo Kiev
- Relegated: SKA Rostov-na-Donu, Tavriya Simferopol
- European Cup: Dinamo Kiev
- Cup Winners' Cup: SKA Rostov-na-Donu
- UEFA Cup: Spartak Moscow; Dinamo Moscow; Dinamo Tbilisi
- Matches: 306
- Goals: 779 (2.55 per match)
- Top goalscorer: (23) Ramaz Shengelia (Dinamo Tb.)

Statistics of Soviet Top League for the 1981 season.

== Overview ==
It was contested by 18 teams, and Dynamo Kyiv won the championship.

== League standings ==
Pos	Team	Pld	W	D	L	GF	GA	GD	Pts	Qualification or relegation
1	(Ukrainian Soviet Socialist Republic) Dynamo Kyiv (C)	34	22	9	3	58	26	+32	53	Qualification for European Cup first round
2	(Russian Soviet Federative Socialist Republic) Spartak Moscow	34	19	8	7	70	40	+30	46	Qualification for UEFA Cup first round
3	(Georgian Soviet Socialist Republic) Dinamo Tbilisi	34	16	10	8	62	35	+27	42	Qualification for UEFA Cup first round
4	(Russian Soviet Federative Socialist Republic) Dynamo Moscow	34	15	10	9	41	29	+12	40	Qualification for UEFA Cup first round
5	(Russian Soviet Federative Socialist Republic) Torpedo Moscow	34	14	14	6	41	29	+12	38 (Note: 4 points deducted (10 draw limit))	Qualification for Cup Winners' Cup first round
6	(Russian Soviet Federative Socialist Republic) CSKA Moscow	34	14	9	11	39	33	+6	37	
7	(Ukrainian Soviet Socialist Republic) Shakhtar Donetsk	34	12	10	12	51	39	+12	34	
8	(Ukrainian Soviet Socialist Republic) Dnipro Dnipropetrovsk	34	12	8	14	42	53	−11	32	
9	(Byelorussian Soviet Socialist Republic) Dinamo Minsk	34	11	13	10	44	39	+5	32 (Note: 3 points deducted (10 draw limit))	
10	(Azerbaijan Soviet Socialist Republic) Neftchi Baku	34	11	12	11	34	49	−15	32 (Note: 2 points deducted (10 draw limit))	
11	(Ukrainian Soviet Socialist Republic) Chornomorets Odessa	34	11	9	14	36	44	−8	31	
12	(Kazakh Soviet Socialist Republic) Kairat Alma-Ata	34	10	12	12	42	46	−4	30	
13	(Russian Soviet Federative Socialist Republic) Kuban Krasnodar	34	11	7	16	42	54	−12	29	
14	(Armenian Soviet Socialist Republic) Ararat Yerevan	34	10	9	15	44	50	−6	29	
15	(Russian Soviet Federative Socialist Republic) Zenit Leningrad	34	9	10	15	33	43	−10	28	
16	(Russian Soviet Federative Socialist Republic) SKA Rostov-on-Don (R)	34	8	10	16	39	58	−19	26	Relegation to First League
17	(Ukrainian Soviet Socialist Republic) Tavria Simferopol (R)	34	8	7	19	27	54	−27	23	Relegation to First League
18	(Uzbek Soviet Socialist Republic) Pakhtakor Tashkent (Note: Pakhtakor Tashkent avoided relegation as it received a three-year guarantee of no relegation after the 1979 airplane crash.)	34	7	5	22	34	58	−24	19	

(C) Champions; (R) Relegated

== Results ==
Home \ Away	ARA	CHO	CSK	DNI	DYK	DMN	DYN	DTB	KAI	KUB	NEF	PAK	SHA	SKA	SPA	TAV	TOR	ZEN
Ararat Yerevan		2–3	1–0	3–0	1–1	0–2	1–1	1–4	1–1	4–2	6–1	3–1	0–0	4–0	1–2	2–1	3–2	2–1
Chornomorets Odessa	1–0		2–3	0–1	1–3	3–3	2–1	1–1	1–0	2–0	0–0	1–0	1–2	0–1	1–4	2–0	1–1	0–0
CSKA Moscow	0–0	0–2		1–1	2–0	2–1	0–2	1–0	0–0	1–0	1–1	1–1	2–1	1–1	2–0	1–0	1–2	2–0
Dnipro	3–1	0–1	2–1		0–1	1–1	1–0	1–0	4–3	0–1	3–0	2–1	1–2	0–1	1–1	2–2	1–1	2–1
Dynamo Kyiv	1–0	2–1	0–0	3–1		3–3	3–0	1–0	3–0	2–1	1–1	4–0	2–1	3–2	2–0	3–1	1–0	3–0
Dinamo Minsk	1–2	1–1	0–1	2–0	0–1		0–2	1–4	1–1	0–2	1–1	3–1	1–1	3–2	1–1	2–0	1–1	2–0
Dynamo Moscow	0–0	1–0	2–1	4–1	2–1	0–0		1–1	2–1	4–2	1–0	1–2	1–1	2–0	1–1	1–0	2–1	0–2
Dinamo Tbilisi	3–1	1–1	2–1	4–0	3–1	1–2	0–2		2–1	2–0	1–1	3–0	1–1	3–0	3–1	5–0	0–0	3–1
Kairat Alma-Ata	2–1	3–0	0–2	1–1	2–2	1–0	1–0	1–3		2–0	2–0	2–0	2–0	1–0	0–2	0–0	1–2	1–1
Kuban Krasnodar	5–1	2–0	2–1	2–2	0–2	0–4	1–1	1–1	2–1		0–0	3–0	2–1	4–0	0–2	2–1	0–0	2–2
Neftçi Baku	0–0	2–1	2–1	4–2	1–1	0–0	1–0	1–0	3–1	2–1		3–1	1–1	2–0	1–1	1–0	1–2	1–0
Pakhtakor Tashkent	3–1	1–3	0–0	1–2	1–2	0–1	1–1	0–1	2–3	0–1	3–0		3–1	1–2	3–0	1–0	1–1	0–1
Shakhtar Donetsk	1–0	2–0	2–1	5–3	0–0	0–1	0–0	4–1	1–1	2–0	5–0	1–1		4–0	1–2	3–0	1–1	2–3
SKA Rostov-on-Don	0–0	0–0	1–4	1–1	0–1	2–3	2–1	1–1	2–2	6–1	1–1	3–2	2–1		3–4	3–0	0–0	1–3
Spartak Moscow	3–0	2–2	3–0	3–1	1–2	1–0	1–2	3–1	3–0	4–2	4–1	5–1	1–0	1–1		6–1	3–1	1–1
Tavriya Simferopol	2–1	1–0	0–1	0–1	0–0	2–2	1–0	0–3	3–3	3–1	3–0	1–0	0–3	1–1	0–2		1–1	1–0
Torpedo Moscow	2–0	3–0	1–1	0–1	0–0	1–0	0–3	2–2	1–1	1–0	3–1	1–0	3–0	2–0	2–2	1–0		1–0
Zenit Leningrad	1–1	1–2	1–3	1–0	1–3	1–1	0–0	2–2	1–1	0–0	2–0	1–2	2–1	1–0	2–0	0–2	0–1	

Legend: Blue = home team win; Yellow = draw; Red = away team win.

== Top scorers ==
23 goals

- Ramaz Shengelia (Dinamo Tbilisi)

21 goals

- Yuri Gavrilov (Spartak Moscow)

19 goals

- Oleg Blokhin (Dynamo Kyiv)

16 goals

- Vladimir Kazachyonok (Zenit)

15 goals

- Valery Gazzaev (Dynamo Moscow)

14 goals

- Khoren Hovhannisyan (Ararat)
- Pyotr Vasilevsky (Dinamo Minsk)

13 goals

- Andrei Yakubik (Pakhtakor)

12 goals

- Viktor Grachyov (Shakhtar)
- Aleksandr Pogorelov (Dnipro)

== Medal squads ==
(league appearances and goals listed in brackets)

1. FC Dynamo Kyiv

Goalkeepers: Mykhaylo Mykhaylov (25), Yuriy Romenskyi (9).
Defenders: Volodymyr Lozynskyi (34 / 2), Anatoliy Konkov (31), Sergei Baltacha (29), Anatoliy Demyanenko (29 / 2), Oleksandr Boyko (22), Oleksandr Sorokalet (10 / 1), Serhiy Zhuravlyov (5), Viktor Kaplun (5), Yuriy Makhynya (3).
Midfielders: Andriy Bal (30 / 3), Leonid Buryak (29 / 9), Volodymyr Bezsonov (25 / 2), Volodymyr Veremeyev (24 / 4), Yaroslav Dumanskyi (12), Viktor Kolotov (4), Vasyl Rats (2).
Forwards: Vadym Yevtushenko (31 / 8), Oleg Blokhin (29 / 19), Viktor Khlus (28 / 8), Aleksandr Khapsalis (21), Stepan Yurchyshyn (1).

Manager: Valeriy Lobanovskyi.

Transferred out during the season: .

2. FC Spartak Moscow

Goalkeepers: Rinat Dasayev (34), Aleksei Prudnikov (1).
Defenders: Vladimir Sochnov (32 / 1), Viktor Samokhin (27 / 1), Oleg Romantsev (25), Alexander Mirzoyan (22), Gennady Morozov (14), Gocha Machaidze (1).
Midfielders: Sergey Shavlo (34 / 8), Fyodor Cherenkov (32 / 4), Sergei Shvetsov (25 / 5), Yevgeni Sidorov (21), Boris Pozdnyakov (14), Manuchar Machaidze (2).
Forwards: Yuri Gavrilov (33 / 21), Edgar Gess (33 / 11), Aleksandr Kalashnikov (32 / 9), Sergey Rodionov (29 / 9), Vladimir Safronenko (12 / 1), Sergei Krestenenko (9), Sergei Argudyayev (2).

Manager: Konstantin Beskov.

Transferred out during the season: .

3. FC Dinamo Tbilisi

Goalkeepers: Otar Gabelia (31), Karlo Mchedlidze (5).
Defenders: Nodar Khizanishvili (30), Tengiz Sulakvelidze (29 / 4), Giorgi Tavadze (28 / 1), Aleksandre Chivadze (28 / 2), Shota Khinchagashvili (19), Tamaz Kostava (15), David Mudzhiri (13), Amiran Andguladze (9), Levan Melikia (7), Giorgi Chilaia (4).
Midfielders: Vitaly Daraselia (33 / 2), Zaur Svanadze (33 / 2), Nugzar Kakilashvili (25 / 5), Gocha Dzhohadze (7 / 1), Amiran Minashvili (1).
Forwards: Vladimir Gutsaev (33 / 3), Ramaz Shengelia (31 / 23), Vazha Zhvania (19 / 4), David Kipiani (18 / 8), Revaz Chelebadze (6 / 3), Grigol Tsaava (5).

Manager: Nodar Akhalkatsi.

Transferred out during the season: .

== Attendances ==
#	Football club	Average
1	Dinamo Tbilisi	47,271
2	Dynamo Kyiv	37,259
3	Kuban	33,824
4	Zenit	23,871
5	Spartak Moscow	23,241
6	Shakhtar Donetsk	22,812
7	Dnipro	21,100
8	Tavriya	19,059
9	Chornomorets	17,171
10	Dinamo Minsk	16,012
11	Ararat	15,718
12	Kairat	15,553
13	Rostov-on-Don	13,829
14	Neftchi	13,535
15	Dynamo Moscow	10,804
16	Torpedo Moscow	8,176
17	PFC CSKA	7,929
18	Paxtakor	6,894
