= 1981 European Cup Winners' Cup final =

- Match programme cover
- Event: 1980–81 European Cup Winners' Cup
Dinamo Tbilisi	Carl Zeiss Jena
(Soviet Union)	(East Germany)
2	1
- Date: 13 May 1981
- Venue: Rheinstadion, Düsseldorf
- Referee: Riccardo Lattanzi (Italy)
- Attendance: 4,750

The 1981 European Cup Winners' Cup Final was a football match contested on 13 May 1981 between Dinamo Tbilisi of the Soviet Union and Carl Zeiss Jena of East Germany. It was the final game of the 1980–81 European Cup Winners' Cup, and the 21st European Cup Winners' Cup final, held at Rheinstadion in Düsseldorf, West Germany. Only 4,750 people attended the match, though some sources claim there were 9,000 people. Dinamo Tbilisi won the match 2–1 thanks to goals by Vladimir Gutsaev and Vitaly Daraselia.

== Route to the final ==
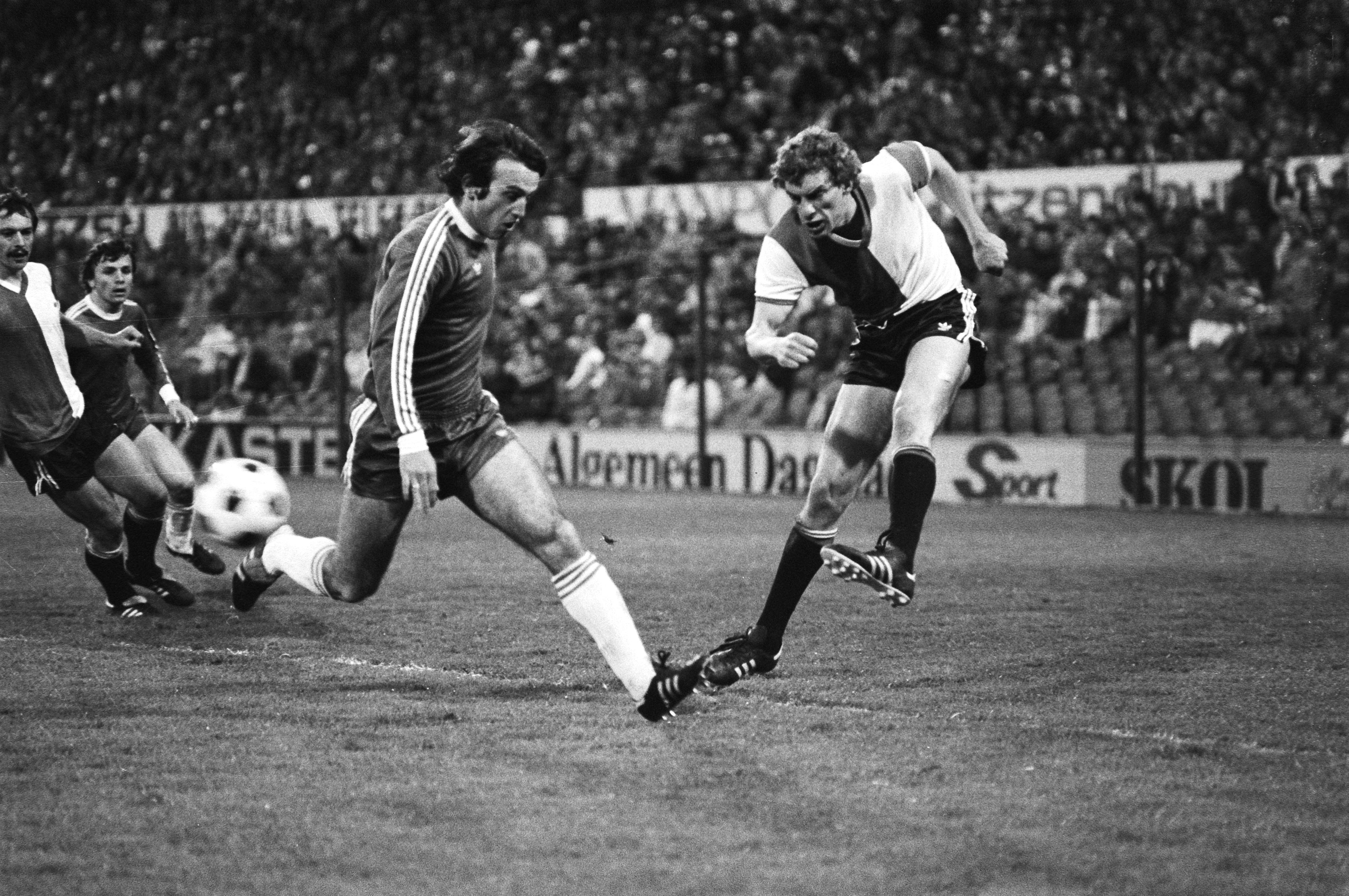
Semi-finals: Dinamo Tbilisi against Feyenoord

(Soviet Union) Dinamo Tbilisi				Round	(East Germany) Carl Zeiss Jena			
Opponent	Agg.	1st leg	2nd leg	Stages	Opponent	Agg.	1st leg	2nd leg
(Greece) Kastoria	2–0	0–0 (A)	2–0 (H)	First round	(Italy) Roma	4–3	0–3 (A)	4–0 (H)
(Republic of Ireland) Waterford United	5–0	1–0 (A)	4–0 (H)	Second round	(Spain) Valencia	3–2	3–1 (H)	0–1 (A)
(England) West Ham United	4–2	4–1 (A)	0–1 (H)	Quarter-finals	(Wales) Newport County	3–2	2–2 (H)	1–0 (A)
(Netherlands) Feyenoord	3–2	3–0 (H)	0–2 (A)	Semi-finals	(Portugal) Benfica	2–1	2–0 (H)	0–1 (A)

== Match ==
=== Details ===
13 May 1981
20:15 CEST

Dinamo Tbilisi (Soviet Union)	2–1	(East Germany) Carl Zeiss Jena
Gutsaev 67'; Daraselia 86'	Report	Hoppe 63'

Rheinstadion, Düsseldorf
Attendance: 4,750
Referee: Riccardo Lattanzi (Italy)

Dinamo Tbilisi	Carl Zeiss Jena

GK	1	(Soviet Union) Otar Gabelia
DF	2	(Soviet Union) Tamaz Kostava
DF	3	(Soviet Union) Aleksandre Chivadze (c)
DF	4	(Soviet Union) Nodar Khizanishvili
DF	5	(Soviet Union) Giorgi Tavadze
MF	6	(Soviet Union) Vitaly Daraselia
MF	7	(Soviet Union) Zaur Svanadze	(substituted off) 67'
MF	8	(Soviet Union) Tengiz Sulakvelidze
MF	9	(Soviet Union) Vladimir Gutsaev
FW	10	(Soviet Union) David Kipiani
FW	11	(Soviet Union) Ramaz Shengelia
Substitutes:
MF	13	(Soviet Union) Nugzar Kakilashvili	(substituted on) 67'
Manager:
(Soviet Union) Nodar Akhalkatsi

GK	1	(East Germany) Hans-Ulrich Grapenthin
DF	2	(East Germany) Gert Brauer
MF	3	(East Germany) Gerhard Hoppe	(substituted off) 88'
DF	4	(East Germany) Wolfgang Schilling
DF	5	(East Germany) Lothar Kurbjuweit (c)
SW	6	(East Germany) Rüdiger Schnuphase
MF	7	(East Germany) Andreas Krause
MF	8	(East Germany) Lutz Lindemann
FW	9	(East Germany) Andreas Bielau	(substituted off) 76'
FW	10	(East Germany) Jürgen Raab
FW	11	(East Germany) Eberhard Vogel
Substitutes:
MF	13	(East Germany) Ulrich Oevermann	(substituted on) 88'
MF	15	(East Germany) Thomas Töpfer	(substituted on) 76'
Manager:
(East Germany) Hans Meyer

Assistant referees:
Luigi Agnolin (Italy)
Paolo Bergamo (Italy)

Match rules

- 90 minutes.
- 30 minutes of extra time if necessary.
- Penalty shoot-out if scores still level.
- Five named substitutes.
- Maximum of two substitutions.

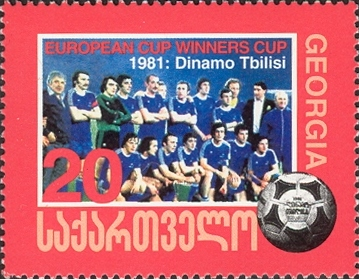
Dinamo Tbilisi, winner of 1981 European Cup Winners' Cup on stamp of Georgia, 2002

== See also ==
- 1981 European Cup Final
- 1981 UEFA Cup Final
