= Georgian football clubs in European competitions =

Georgian football clubs have competed in European football tournaments since 1972–73 season, when Dinamo Tbilisi took part in UEFA Cup. At the time Georgian clubs were representing the Soviet Union. After gaining independence in 1991, clubs took part in the UEFA Champions League (formerly European Cup), UEFA Europa League (formerly UEFA Cup), UEFA Cup Winners' Cup and UEFA Intertoto Cup. Georgian clubs have been qualifying to European competitions through the Erovnuli Liga and Georgian Cup.

The biggest achievement of Georgian club football is winning UEFA Cup Winners' Cup in 1981 by Dinamo Tbilisi.

== UEFA Rankings ==
=== Current rankings (after 2025–26) ===
- 51 Luxembourg
- 52 Montenegro
- 53 (Georgia (country)) Georgia
- 54 Wales
- 55 San Marino

UEFA Country Ranking for league participation in 2026–27 European football season.

- 49 Estonia
- 50 Northern Ireland
- 51 (Georgia (country)) Georgia
- 52 Luxembourg
- 53 Montenegro

=== History of rankings ===
Below is a historical list of Georgian rankings and country coefficient since 2010.

Year	Position	Change	Coefficient	Teams
2010	37	▲	1.750	4
2011	36	▲	1.875	4
2012	31	▲	2.875	4
2013	31	Steady	1.500	4
2014	33	▼	1.875	4
2015	34	▼	1.250	4
2016	36	▼	0.625	4
2017	40	▼	1.125	4
2018	45	▼	0.125	4
2019	47	▼	1.625	4
2020	44	▲	2.250	4
2021	43	▲	1.750	4
2022	47	▼	1.250	4
2023	46	▲	1.125	4
2024	46	Steady	1.250	4
2025	50	▼	1.250	4

=== Coefficients by club ===
==== Five seasons ====
Club	2022-23	2023-24	2024-25	2025-26	2026-27	Five-season total
Iberia 1999	1.500	0.000	2.000	1.500	≥2.500	≥7.500
Dila Gori	1.000	2.000	0.000	1.500	1.500	6.000
Dinamo Tbilisi	1.000	1.500	1.000	0.000	1.500	5.000
Torpedo Kutaisi	0.000	1.500	1.500	1.500	1.000	5.500
Dinamo Batumi	1.500	1.000	1.500	0.000	0.000	4.000
Spaeri	0.000	0.000	0.000	1.500	0.000	1.500

==== Ten Seasons ====
Club	2017-18	2018-19	2019-20	2020-21	2021-22	2022-23	2023-24	2024-25	2025-26	2026-27	Ten-season total
Dinamo Tbilisi	0.000	1.000	2.000	2.000	1.500	1.000	1.500	1.000	0.000	1.500	11.500
Iberia 1999	0.000	0.000	2.000	1.000	0.000	1.500	0.000	2.000	1.500	≥2.500	≥10.500
Torpedo Kutaisi	0.250	2.500	1.000	0.000	0.000	0.000	1.500	1.500	1.500	1.000	9.250
Dinamo Batumi	0.250	0.000	0.000	1.000	2.000	1.500	1.000	1.500	0.000	0.000	7.250
Dila Gori	0.000	0.000	0.000	0.000	1.000	1.000	2.000	0.000	1.500	1.500	7.000
Chikhura Sachkhere	0.250	1.500	1.500	0.000	0.000	0.000	0.000	0.000	0.000	0.000	3.250
Locomotive Tbilisi	0.000	0.000	0.000	2.000	0.000	0.000	0.000	0.000	0.000	0.000	2.000
Samtredia	1.000	1.000	0.000	0.000	0.000	0.000	0.000	0.000	0.000	0.000	2.000
Spaeri	0.000	0.000	0.000	0.000	0.000	0.000	0.000	0.000	1.500	0.000	1.500
Gagra	0.000	0.000	0.000	0.000	1.000	0.000	0.000	0.000	0.000	0.000	1.000

NOTE: For Locomotive, Samtredia, Spaeri and Gagra, 2.700 (20% of Georgia's national coefficient over the last 10 seasons) is used as a coefficient instead of the values shown in the table, due to 2.700 being higher than the club's coefficients.

== European champions ==
European Cup/ Champions League	UEFA Cup/ Europa League	Cup Winners' Cup	Inter-Cities Fairs Cup	UEFA Super Cup	Intertoto Cup
None	None	1980–81 – Dinamo Tbilisi	None	None	None

== Records ==
- Biggest home win:
  - (Georgia (country)) Dinamo Batumi 6–0 (Faroe Islands) HB (1996)
  - (Georgia (country)) Torpedo Kutaisi 6–0 (Armenia) Erebuni-Homenmen (1998)
  - (Georgia (country)) Zestaponi 6–0 (Northern Ireland) Lisburn Distillery (2009)
- Biggest away win: (Estonia) Lantana 0–5 (Georgia (country)) Torpedo Kutaisi (1999)
- Biggest home loss: (Georgia (country)) Locomotive 0–7 (Greece) PAOK (1999)
- Biggest away loss: (Serbia and Montenegro) Red Star Belgrade 7–0 (Georgia (country)) Kolkheti 1913 (1998)

== All-time record by clubs ==
As of 11 August 2026

Rank	Club	Matches	Won	Drawn	Lost	GF	GA	GD
1	Dinamo Tbilisi	180	75	27	78	248	264	-16
2	Torpedo Kutaisi	52	15	9	28	65	99	-34
3	Dila	36	13	4	19	34	47	-13
4	Dinamo Batumi	33	10	7	16	38	49	-11
5	Iberia 1999	25	7	5	13	25	41	-16
6	WIT Georgia	25	6	5	14	24	53	-29
7	Zestaponi	24	6	7	11	35	31	+4
8	Chikhura	22	6	9	7	19	26	-7
9	Metalurgi	18	6	4	8	22	25	-3
10	Locomotive	17	4	5	8	14	32	-18
11	Kolkheti 1913	10	1	0	9	7	31	-24
12	Sioni	8	2	0	6	6	15	-9
13	Samtredia	8	1	0	7	3	18	-15
14	Ameri	6	2	1	3	6	7	-1
15	Merani Tbilisi	4	2	0	2	8	5	+3
16	Gagra	4	1	1	2	3	5	-2
17	Tbilisi	4	2	0	2	5	8	-3
18	Margveti	2	1	0	1	3	4	-1
19	Tskhinvali	2	0	1	1	2	4	-2
20	Spaeri	2	0	0	2	0	7	-7

== Competitions ==
=== Active ===
==== UEFA Champions League/European Cup ====
As of 29 July 2026

Season	Round	Team	Opponent	Home	Away
1979–80	R1	(Soviet Union) Dinamo Tbilisi	(England) Liverpool	3–0	1–2
1979–80	R2	(Soviet Union) Dinamo Tbilisi	(Germany) Hamburg	2–3	1–3
1993–94	Preliminary round	(Georgia (country)) Dinamo Tbilisi	(Northern Ireland) Linfield	2–1	1–1
1997–98	QR1	(Georgia (country)) Dinamo Tbilisi	(Northern Ireland) Crusaders	5–1	3–1
1997–98	QR2	(Georgia (country)) Dinamo Tbilisi	(Germany) Bayer Leverkusen	1–0	1–6
1998–99	QR1	(Georgia (country)) Dinamo Tbilisi	(Albania) Vllaznia Shkodër	3–0	1–3
1998–99	QR2	(Georgia (country)) Dinamo Tbilisi	(Spain) Athletic Bilbao	2–1	0–1
1999–00	QR2	(Georgia (country)) Dinamo Tbilisi	(Moldova) Zimbru Chișinău	2–1	0–2
2000–01	QR2	(Georgia (country)) Torpedo Kutaisi	(Serbia and Montenegro) Red Star Belgrade	2–0	0–4
2001–02	QR1	(Georgia (country)) Torpedo Kutaisi	(Northern Ireland) Linfield	1–0	0–0
2001–02	QR2	(Georgia (country)) Torpedo Kutaisi	(Denmark) Copenhagen	1–1	1–3
2002–03	QR1	(Georgia (country)) Torpedo Kutaisi	(Faroe Islands) B36 Tórshavn	5–2	1–0
2002–03	QR2	(Georgia (country)) Torpedo Kutaisi	(Czech Republic) Sparta Prague	1–2	0–3
2003–04	QR1	(Georgia (country)) Dinamo Tbilisi	(Albania) Tirana	3–0	0–3 (2–4p)
2004–05	QR1	(Georgia (country)) WIT Georgia	(Faroe Islands) HB	5–0	0–3
2004–05	QR2	(Georgia (country)) WIT Georgia	(Poland) Wisła Kraków	2–8	0–3
2005–06	QR1	(Georgia (country)) Dinamo Tbilisi	(Estonia) Levadia Tallinn	2–0	0–1
2005–06	QR2	(Georgia (country)) Dinamo Tbilisi	(Denmark) Brøndby	0–2	1–3
2006–07	QR1	(Georgia (country)) Sioni Bolnisi	(Azerbaijan) Baku	2–0	0–1
2006–07	QR2	(Georgia (country)) Sioni Bolnisi	(Bulgaria) Levski Sofia	0–2	0–2
2007–08	QR1	(Georgia (country)) Olimpi Rustavi	(Kazakhstan) Astana-1964	0–0	0–3
2008–09	QR1	(Georgia (country)) Dinamo Tbilisi	(Faroe Islands) NSÍ Runavík	3–0	0–1
2008–09	QR2	(Georgia (country)) Dinamo Tbilisi	(Greece) Panathinaikos	0–0	0–3
2009–10	QR2	(Georgia (country)) WIT Georgia	(Slovenia) Maribor	0–0	1–3
2010–11	QR2	(Georgia (country)) Olimpi Rustavi	(Kazakhstan) Aktobe	1–1	0–2
2011–12	QR2	(Georgia (country)) Zestaponi	(Moldova) Dacia Chișinău	3–0	0–2
2011–12	QR3	(Georgia (country)) Zestaponi	(Austria) Sturm Graz	1–1	0–1
2012–13	QR2	(Georgia (country)) Zestaponi	(Azerbaijan) Neftçi	2–2	0–3
2013–14	QR2	(Georgia (country)) Dinamo Tbilisi	(Faroe Islands) EB/Streymur	6–1	3–1
2013–14	QR3	(Georgia (country)) Dinamo Tbilisi	(Romania) Steaua București	0–2	1–1
2014–15	QR2	(Georgia (country)) Dinamo Tbilisi	(Kazakhstan) Aktobe	0–1	0–3
2015–16	QR2	(Georgia (country)) Dila Gori	(Serbia) Partizan	0–2	0–1
2016–17	QR2	(Georgia (country)) Dinamo Tbilisi	(Armenia) Alashkert	2–0	1–1
2016–17	QR3	(Georgia (country)) Dinamo Tbilisi	(Croatia) Dinamo Zagreb	0–1	0–2
2017–18	QR2	(Georgia (country)) Samtredia	(Azerbaijan) Qarabağ	0–1	0–5
2018–19	QR1	(Georgia (country)) Torpedo Kutaisi	(Moldova) Sheriff Tiraspol	2–1	0–3
2019–20	QR1	(Georgia (country)) Saburtalo Tbilisi	(Moldova) Sheriff Tiraspol	1–3	3–0
2019–20	QR2	(Georgia (country)) Saburtalo Tbilisi	(Croatia) Dinamo Zagreb	0–2	0–3
2020–21	QR1	(Georgia (country)) Dinamo Tbilisi	(Albania) Tirana	0–2	—N/a
2021–22	QR1	(Georgia (country)) Dinamo Tbilisi	(Azerbaijan) Neftçi Baku	1–2	1–2
2022–23	QR1	(Georgia (country)) Dinamo Batumi	(Slovakia) Slovan Bratislava	1–2 (aet)	0–0
2023–24	QR1	(Georgia (country)) Dinamo Tbilisi	(Kazakhstan) Astana	1–2	1–1
2024–25	QR1	(Georgia (country)) Dinamo Batumi	(Bulgaria) Ludogorets	1–0	1–3
2025–26	QR1	(Georgia (country)) Iberia 1999	(Sweden) Malmö FF	1–3	1–3
2026–27	QR1	(Georgia (country)) Iberia 1999	(Estonia) Flora	2–2	3–2
2026–27	QR2	(Georgia (country)) Iberia 1999	(Slovakia) Slovan Bratislava	0–2	1–1

==== UEFA Europa League/UEFA Cup ====
As of 4 August 2026

Season	Round	Team	Opponent	Home	Away
1972–73	R1	(Soviet Union) Dinamo Tbilisi	(Netherlands) Twente	3–2	0–2
1973–74	R1	(Soviet Union) Dinamo Tbilisi	(Bulgaria) Slavia Sofia	4–1	0–2
1973–74	R2	(Soviet Union) Dinamo Tbilisi	(Socialist Federal Republic of Yugoslavia) OFK Beograd	3–0	5–1
1973–74	R3	(Soviet Union) Dinamo Tbilisi	(England) Tottenham Hotspur	1–1	1–5
1977–78	R1	(Soviet Union) Dinamo Tbilisi	(Italy) Inter Milan	0–0	1–0
1977–78	R2	(Soviet Union) Dinamo Tbilisi	(Denmark) KB	2–1	4–1
1977–78	R3	(Soviet Union) Dinamo Tbilisi	(Switzerland) Grasshoppers	1–0	0–4
1978–79	R1	(Soviet Union) Dinamo Tbilisi	(Italy) Napoli	2–0	1–1
1978–79	R2	(Soviet Union) Dinamo Tbilisi	(Germany) Hertha	1–0	0–2
1982–83	R1	(Soviet Union) Dinamo Tbilisi	(Italy) Napoli	2–1	0–1
1987–88	R1	(Soviet Union) Dinamo Tbilisi	(Bulgaria) Lokomotiv Sofia	3–0	1–3
1987–88	R2	(Soviet Union) Dinamo Tbilisi	(Romania) Victoria București	0–0	2–1
1987–88	R3	(Soviet Union) Dinamo Tbilisi	(Germany) Werder Bremen	1–1	1–2
1994–95	Preliminary round	(Georgia (country)) Dinamo Tbilisi	(Romania) Universitatea Craiova	2–0	2–1
1994–95	R1	(Georgia (country)) Dinamo Tbilisi	(Austria) Tirol Innsbruck	1–0	1–5
1995–96	Preliminary round	(Georgia (country)) Dinamo Tbilisi	(Bulgaria) Botev Plovdiv	0–1	0–1
1995–96	Preliminary round	(Georgia (country)) Iberia Samtredia	(North Macedonia) Vardar	0–2	0–1
1996–97	Preliminary round	(Georgia (country)) Dinamo Tbilisi	(Luxembourg) Grevenmacher	4–0	2–2
1996–97	QR	(Georgia (country)) Dinamo Tbilisi	(Norway) Molde	2–1	0–0
1996–97	R1	(Georgia (country)) Dinamo Tbilisi	(Russia) Torpedo Moscow	1–1	1–0
1996–97	R2	(Georgia (country)) Dinamo Tbilisi	(Portugal) Boavista	1–0	0–5
1996–97	Preliminary round	(Georgia (country)) Margveti	(Malta) Sliema Wanderers	0–3	3–1
1997–98	QR1	(Georgia (country)) Kolkheti-1913 Poti	(Belarus) Dinamo Minsk	2–1	0–1
1997–98	R1	(Georgia (country)) Dinamo Tbilisi	(Belarus) MPKC Mozyr	1–0	1–1
1997–98	R2	(Georgia (country)) Dinamo Tbilisi	(Portugal) Braga	0–1	0–4
1998–99	QR1	(Georgia (country)) Kolkheti 1913	(Serbia and Montenegro) Red Star Belgrade	0–4	0–7
1998–99	R1	(Georgia (country)) Dinamo Tbilisi	(Netherlands) Willem II	0–3	0–3
1999–00	QR	(Georgia (country)) Locomotive	(Northern Ireland) Linfield	1–0	1–1
1999–00	R1	(Georgia (country)) Locomotive	(Greece) PAOK	0–7	0–2
1999–00	QR	(Georgia (country)) Torpedo Kutaisi	(Estonia) Lantana	4–2	5–0
1999–00	R1	(Georgia (country)) Torpedo Kutaisi	(Greece) AEK Athens	0–1	1–6
2000–01	QR	(Georgia (country)) WIT Georgia	(Israel) Beitar Jerusalem	0–3	1–1
2000–01	QR	(Georgia (country)) Locomotive	(Slovakia) Slovan Bratislava	0–2	0–2
2001–02	QR	(Georgia (country)) Dinamo Tbilisi	(Belarus) BATE Borisov	2–1	0–4
2001–02	QR	(Georgia (country)) Locomotive	(Malta) Birkirkara	1–1	0–0
2002–03	QR	(Georgia (country)) Locomotive	(Denmark) Copenhagen	1–4	1–3
2002–03	QR	(Georgia (country)) Dinamo Tbilisi	(Estonia) TVMK Tallinn	4–1	1–0
2002–03	R1	(Georgia (country)) Dinamo Tbilisi	(Czech Republic) Slovan Liberec	0–1	2–3
2003–04	QR	(Georgia (country)) Sioni	(Slovakia) Matador Púchov	0–3	0–3
2003–04	QR	(Georgia (country)) Torpedo Kutaisi	(France) Lens	0–2	0–3
2004–05	QR1	(Georgia (country)) Tbilisi	(Azerbaijan) Shamkir	1–0	4–1
2004–05	QR2	(Georgia (country)) Tbilisi	(Poland) Legia Warsaw	0–1	0–6
2004–05	QR1	(Georgia (country)) Dinamo Tbilisi	(Belarus) BATE Borisov	1–0	3–2
2004–05	QR2	(Georgia (country)) Dinamo Tbilisi	(Czech Republic) Slavia Prague	2–0	1–3
2004–05	R1	(Georgia (country)) Dinamo Tbilisi	(Poland) Wisła Kraków	2–1	3–4
2004–05	Group D	(Georgia (country)) Dinamo Tbilisi	(France) Sochaux	0–2	
2004–05	Group D	(Georgia (country)) Dinamo Tbilisi	(England) Newcastle United		0–2
2004–05	Group D	(Georgia (country)) Dinamo Tbilisi	(Portugal) Sporting	0–4	
2004–05	Group D	(Georgia (country)) Dinamo Tbilisi	(Greece) Panionios		2–5
2005–06	QR1	(Georgia (country)) Locomotive	(Armenia) Banants	0–2	3–2
2005–06	QR1	(Georgia (country)) Torpedo Kutaisi	(Belarus) BATE Borisov	0–1	0–5
2006–07	QR1	(Georgia (country)) Ameri Tbilisi	(Armenia) Banants	0–1	2–1
2006–07	QR2	(Georgia (country)) Ameri	(Germany) Hertha BSC	2–2	0–1
2006–07	QR1	(Georgia (country)) WIT Georgia	(Slovakia) Artmedia	2–1	0–2
2007–08	QR1	(Georgia (country)) Ameri	(Poland) Bełchatów	2–0 (2–4p)	0–2
2007–08	QR1	(Georgia (country)) Dinamo Tbilisi	(Liechtenstein) Vaduz	2–0	0–0
2007–08	QR2	(Georgia (country)) Dinamo Tbilisi	(Austria) Rapid Wien	0–3	0–5
2008–09	QR1	(Georgia (country)) Zestaponi	(Hungary) Győri ETO	1–2	1–1
2008–09	QR1	(Georgia (country)) WIT Georgia	(Slovakia) Spartak Trnava	1–0	2–2
2008–09	QR2	(Georgia (country)) WIT Georgia	Austria Wien		0–2
2009–10	QR1	(Georgia (country)) Olimpi Rustavi	(Faroe Islands) B36 Tórshavn	2–0	2–0
2009–10	QR2	(Georgia (country)) Olimpi	(Poland) Legia Warsaw	0–1	0–3
2009–10	QR1	(Georgia (country)) Zestaponi	(Northern Ireland) Lisburn Distillery	6–0	5–1
2009–10	QR2	(Georgia (country)) Zestaponi	(Sweden) Helsingborg	1–2	2–2 (aet)
2009–10	QR2	(Georgia (country)) Dinamo Tbilisi	(Latvia) Liepājas Metalurgs	3–1	1–2
2009–10	QR3	(Georgia (country)) Dinamo Tbilisi	(Serbia) Red Star Belgrade	2–0	2–5
2010–11	QR1	(Georgia (country)) Zestaponi	(San Marino) Faetano	5–0	0–0
2010–11	QR2	(Georgia (country)) Zestaponi	(Slovakia) Dukla Banská Bystrica	3–0	0–1
2010–11	QR3	(Georgia (country)) Zestaponi	(Ukraine) Karpaty Lviv	0–1	0–1
2010–11	QR1	(Georgia (country)) Dinamo Tbilisi	(Estonia) Flora	2–1	0–0
2010–11	QR2	(Georgia (country)) Dinamo Tbilisi	(Sweden) Gefle	2–1	2–1
2010–11	QR3	(Georgia (country)) Dinamo Tbilisi	(Austria) Sturm Graz	1–1	0–2
2010–11	QR2	(Georgia (country)) WIT Georgia	(Czech Republic) Baník Ostrava	0–6	0–0
2011–12	QR1	(Georgia (country)) Dinamo Tbilisi	(Moldova) Milsami Orhei	2–0	3–1
2011–12	QR2	(Georgia (country)) Dinamo Tbilisi	(Wales) Llanelli	5–0	1–2
2011–12	QR3	(Georgia (country)) Dinamo Tbilisi	(Iceland) KR	2–0	4–1
2011–12	Play-off round	(Georgia (country)) Dinamo Tbilisi	(Greece) AEK Athens	1–1 (aet)	0–1
2011–12	QR1	(Georgia (country)) Metalurgi Rustavi	(Armenia) Banants	1–1	1–0
2011–12	QR2	(Georgia (country)) Metalurgi Rustavi	(Kazakhstan) Irtysh Pavlodar	1–1	2–0
2011–12	QR3	(Georgia (country)) Metalurgi Rustavi	(France) Rennes	2–5	0–2
2011–12	QR2	(Georgia (country)) Gagra	(Cyprus) Anorthosis	2–0	0–3
2011–12	Play-off round	(Georgia (country)) Zestaponi	(Belgium) Club Brugge	3–3	0–2
2012–13	QR1	(Georgia (country)) Torpedo Kutaisi	(Kazakhstan) Aktobe	1–1	0–1
2012–13	QR1	(Georgia (country)) Metalurgi Rustavi	(Albania) Teuta Durrës	6–1	3–0
2012–13	QR2	(Georgia (country)) Metalurgi Rustavi	(Czech Republic) Viktoria Plzeň	1–3	0–2
2012–13	QR2	(Georgia (country)) Dila	(Denmark) AGF	3–1	2–1
2012–13	QR3	(Georgia (country)) Dila	(Cyprus) Anorthosis	0–1	3–0
2012–13	Play-off round	(Georgia (country)) Dila	(Portugal) Marítimo	0–2	0–1
2013–14	QR1	(Georgia (country)) Chikhura	(Liechtenstein) Vaduz	0–0	1–1
2013–14	QR2	(Georgia (country)) Chikhura	(Switzerland) Thun	1–3	0–2
2013–14	QR1	(Georgia (country)) Torpedo Kutaisi	(Slovakia) Žilina	0–3	3–3
2013–14	QR2	(Georgia (country)) Dila	(Denmark) AaB	3–0	0–0
2013–14	QR3	(Georgia (country)) Dila	(Croatia) Hajduk Split	1–0	1–0
2013–14	Play-off round	(Georgia (country)) Dila	(Austria) Rapid Wien	0–3	0–1
2013–14	Play-off round	(Georgia (country)) Dinamo Tbilisi	(England) Tottenham Hotspur	0–5	0–3
2014–15	QR1	(Georgia (country)) Sioni	(Albania) Flamurtari Vlorë	2–3	2–1
2014–15	QR1	(Georgia (country)) Chikhura	(North Macedonia) Horizont Turnovo	3–1	1–0
2014–15	QR2	(Georgia (country)) Chikhura	(Turkey) Bursaspor	0–0 (4–1p)	0–0
2014–15	QR3	(Georgia (country)) Chikhura	(Azerbaijan) Neftçi	2–3	0–0
2014–15	QR2	(Georgia (country)) Zestaponi	(Slovakia) Spartak Trnava	0–0	0–3
2015–16	QR1	(Georgia (country)) Dinamo Tbilisi	(Azerbaijan) Gabala	2–1	0–2
2015–16	QR1	(Georgia (country)) Dinamo Batumi	(Cyprus) Omonia	1–0	0–2
2015–16	QR1	(Georgia (country)) Tskhinvali	(Romania) Botoșani	1–3	1–1
2016–17	QR1	(Georgia (country)) Dila	(Armenia) Shirak	1–0	0–1 (1–4p)
2016–17	QR1	(Georgia (country)) Chikhura	(Moldova) Zimbru Chișinău	2–3	1–0
2016–17	QR1	(Georgia (country)) Samtredia	(Azerbaijan) Gabala	2–1	1–5
2016–17	Play-off round	(Georgia (country)) Dinamo Tbilisi	(Greece) PAOK	0–3	0–2
2017–18	QR1	(Georgia (country)) Torpedo Kutaisi	(Slovakia) Trenčín	0–3	1–5
2017–18	QR1	(Georgia (country)) Chikhura	(Austria) Rheindorf Altach	0–1	1–1
2017–18	QR1	(Georgia (country)) Dinamo Batumi	(Poland) Jagiellonia	0–1	0–4
2018–19	QR1	(Georgia (country)) Dinamo Tbilisi	(Slovakia) DAC 1904	1–2	1–1
2018–19	QR1	(Georgia (country)) Samtredia	(Kazakhstan) Tobol	0–1	0–2
2018–19	QR1	(Georgia (country)) Chikhura	(Israel) Beitar Jerusalem	0–0	2–1
2018–19	QR2	(Georgia (country)) Chikhura	(Slovenia) Maribor	0–0	0–2
2018–19	QR2	(Georgia (country)) Torpedo Kutaisi	(Faroe Islands) Víkingur Gøta	3–0	4–0
2018–19	QR3	(Georgia (country)) Torpedo Kutaisi	(Albania) Kukësi	5–2	0–2
2018–19	Play-off round	(Georgia (country)) Torpedo Kutaisi	(Bulgaria) Ludogorets Razgrad	0–1	0–4
2019–20	QR1	(Georgia (country)) Dinamo Tbilisi	(Andorra) Engordany	6–0	1–0
2019–20	QR1	(Georgia (country)) Torpedo Kutaisi	(Kazakhstan) Ordabasy	0–2	0–1
2019–20	QR1	(Georgia (country)) Chikhura	(Luxembourg) Fola Esch	2–1	2–1
2019–20	QR2	(Georgia (country)) Chikhura	(Scotland) Aberdeen	1–1	0–5
2019–20	QR2	(Georgia (country)) Dinamo Tbilisi	(Azerbaijan) Gabala	3–0	2–0
2019–20	QR3	(Georgia (country)) Dinamo Tbilisi	(Netherlands) Feyenoord	1–1	0–4
2019–20	QR3	(Georgia (country)) Saburtalo	Ararat-Armenia	0–2	2–1
2020–21	QR1	(Georgia (country)) Dinamo Batumi	(Israel) Hapoel Be'er Sheva	—N/a	0–3
2020–21	QR1	(Georgia (country)) Saburtalo	(Cyprus) Apollon Limassol	—N/a	1–5
2020–21	QR1	(Georgia (country)) Locomotive	(Romania) Universitatea Craiova	2–1	—N/a
2020–21	QR2	(Georgia (country)) Dinamo Tbilisi	(Wales) Connah's Quay Nomads	—N/a	1–0
2020–21	QR2	(Georgia (country)) Locomotive	(Russia) Dynamo Moscow	2–1	—N/a
2020–21	QR3	(Georgia (country)) Dinamo Tbilisi	(Faroe Islands) KÍ	—N/a	1–6
2020–21	QR3	(Georgia (country)) Locomotive	(Spain) Granada	—N/a	0–2
2026–27	QR3	(Georgia (country)) Iberia 1999	(Northern Ireland) Larne	2–1 (aet)	0–0
2026–27	PO	(Georgia (country)) Iberia 1999	(Poland) Jagiellonia	1–2	0–4

==== UEFA Conference League ====
As of 28 July 2026

Season	Round	Team	Opponent	Home	Away
2021–22	QR1	(Georgia (country)) Dinamo Batumi	(San Marino) Tre Penne	3–0	4–0
2021–22	QR1	(Georgia (country)) Gagra	(Montenegro) Sutjeska	1–1	0–1
2021–22	QR1	(Georgia (country)) Dila	(Slovakia) Žilina	2–1	1–5
2021–22	QR2	(Georgia (country)) Dinamo Tbilisi	(Israel) Maccabi Haifa	1–2	1–5
2021–22	QR2	(Georgia (country)) Dinamo Batumi	(Belarus) BATE Borisov	0–1	4–1
2021–22	QR3	(Georgia (country)) Dinamo Batumi	(Turkey) Sivasspor	1–2	1–1 (aet)
2022–23	QR1	(Georgia (country)) Dinamo Tbilisi	(Estonia) Paide	2–3	2–1 (5–6p)
2022–23	QR1	(Georgia (country)) Dila	(Finland) KuPS	0–0	0–2
2022–23	QR1	(Georgia (country)) Saburtalo	(Albania) Partizani	0–1	1–0 (5–4p)
2022–23	QR2	(Georgia (country)) Saburtalo	(Romania) FCSB	1–0	2–4
2022–23	QR2	(Georgia (country)) Dinamo Batumi	(Poland) Lech Poznań	1–1	0–5
2023–24	QR1	(Georgia (country)) Dinamo Batumi	(Albania) Tirana	1–2	1–1
2023–24	QR1	(Georgia (country)) Dila	(Slovakia) DAC 1904	2–0	1–2
2023–24	QR1	(Georgia (country)) Torpedo Kutaisi	(Bosnia and Herzegovina) Sarajevo	2–2	1–1 (4–2p)
2023–24	QR2	(Georgia (country)) Torpedo Kutaisi	(Kazakhstan) Aktobe	1–4	2–1
2023–24	QR2	(Georgia (country)) Dinamo Tbilisi	(Malta) Hamrun Spartans	0–1	1–2
2023–24	QR2	(Georgia (country)) Dila	(Ukraine) Vorskla	3–1	1–2
2023–24	QR3	(Georgia (country)) Dila	(Cyprus) APOEL	0–2	0–1
2024–25	QR1	(Georgia (country)) Torpedo Kutaisi	(Albania) Tirana	1–1	1–0
2024–25	QR1	(Georgia (country)) Dinamo Tbilisi	(Montenegro) Mornar	1–1	1–2
2024–25	QR2	(Georgia (country)) Dinamo Batumi	(Montenegro) Dečić	0–2	0–0
2024–25	QR2	(Georgia (country)) Torpedo Kutaisi	(Cyprus) Omonia	1–2	1–3
2024–25	QR2	(Georgia (country)) Iberia 1999	(Albania) Partizani	2–0	0–0
2024–25	QR3	(Georgia (country)) Iberia 1999	(Turkey) Başakşehir	0–1	0–2
2025–26	QR1	(Georgia (country)) Torpedo Kutaisi	(Kazakhstan) Ordabasy	4–3	1–1
2025–26	QR1	(Georgia (country)) Dila	(Luxembourg) Union Racing	1–0	2–1
2025–26	QR2	(Georgia (country)) Torpedo	(Cyprus) Omonia	0–4	0–1
2025–26	QR2	(Georgia (country)) Dila	(Latvia) Riga	3–3	0–1
2025–26	QR2	(Georgia (country)) Iberia 1999	(Estonia) Levadia	2–2 (aet)	0–1
2025–26	QR2	(Georgia (country)) Spaeri	Austria Vienna	0–5	0–2
2026–27	QR1	(Georgia (country)) Torpedo Kutaisi	(Azerbaijan) Zirə	0–3	0–3
2026–27	QR1	(Georgia (country)) Dinamo Tbilisi	(Luxembourg) Mondorf-Les-Bains	1–1 (aet)	2–1
2026–27	QR1	(Georgia (country)) Dila	(San Marino) Virtus	3–1	0–1
2026–27	QR2	(Georgia (country)) Dinamo Tbilisi	(Lithuania) Žalgiris	3–0	2–7
2026–27	QR2	(Georgia (country)) Dila	(Cyprus) Apollon Limassol	0–4	0–3

=== Defunct ===
==== UEFA Cup Winners' Cup ====
Season	Round	Team	Opponent	Home	Away
1976–77	R1	(Soviet Union) Dinamo Tbilisi	(Wales) Cardiff City	3–0	0–1
1976–77	R2	(Soviet Union) Dinamo Tbilisi	(Hungary) MTK Budapest	1–4	0–1
1980–81	R1	(Soviet Union) Dinamo Tbilisi	(Greece) Kastoria	2–0	0–0
1980–81	R2	(Soviet Union) Dinamo Tbilisi	(Republic of Ireland) Waterford	4–0	1–0
1980–81	QF	(Soviet Union) Dinamo Tbilisi	(England) West Ham United	0–1	4–1
1980–81	SF	(Soviet Union) Dinamo Tbilisi	(Netherlands) Feyenoord	3–0	0–2
1980–81	Final	(Soviet Union) Dinamo Tbilisi	(East Germany) Carl Zeiss Jena		2–1
1981–82	R1	(Soviet Union) Dinamo Tbilisi	(Austria) Grazer AK	2–0	2–2
1981–82	R2	(Soviet Union) Dinamo Tbilisi	(France) Bastia	3–1	1–1
1981–82	QF	(Soviet Union) Dinamo Tbilisi	(Poland) Legia Warsaw	1–0	1–0
1981–82	SF	(Soviet Union) Dinamo Tbilisi	(Belgium) Standard Liège	0–1	0–1
1995–96	Qualifying round	(Georgia (country)) Dinamo Batumi	(Serbia and Montenegro) Obilić	2–2	1–0
1995–96	R1	(Georgia (country)) Dinamo Batumi	(Scotland) Celtic	2–3	0–4
1996–97	Qualifying round	(Georgia (country)) Dinamo Batumi	(Faroe Islands) HB	6–0	3–0
1996–97	R1	(Georgia (country)) Dinamo Batumi	(Netherlands) PSV Eindhoven	1–1	0–3
1997–98	Qualifying round	(Georgia (country)) Dinamo Batumi	(Armenia) Ararat Yerevan	0–3	2–0
1998–99	Qualifying round	(Georgia (country)) Dinamo Batumi	(Serbia and Montenegro) Partizan	1–0	0–2

==== UEFA Intertoto Cup ====
Season	Round	Team	Opponent	Home	Away
1996	Group 12	(Georgia (country)) Kolkheti-1913 Poti	(Serbia and Montenegro) Zemun	2–3	
1996	Group 12	(Georgia (country)) Kolkheti-1913 Poti	(Finland) Jaro		0–2
1996	Group 12	(Georgia (country)) Kolkheti-1913 Poti	(France) Guingamp	1–3	
1996	Group 12	(Georgia (country)) Kolkheti-1913 Poti	(Romania) Dinamo București		0–2
1997	Group 12	(Georgia (country)) Merani Tbilisi	(Russia) Torpedo Moscow	0–2	
1997	Group 12	(Georgia (country)) Merani Tbilisi	(Greece) Iraklis		0–2
1997	Group 12	(Georgia (country)) Merani Tbilisi	(Malta) Floriana	5–0	
1997	Group 12	(Georgia (country)) Merani Tbilisi	(Austria) Ried		3–1
1998	R1	(Georgia (country)) Torpedo Kutaisi	(Armenia) Erebuni-Homenmen	6–0	1–1
1998	R2	(Georgia (country)) Torpedo Kutaisi	(Belgium) Lommel	1–2	1–0
1999	R1	(Georgia (country)) Kolkheti-1913 Poti	(North Macedonia) Cementarnica 55	0–4	2–4
2000	R1	(Georgia (country)) Dinamo Tbilisi	(Belgium) Standard Liège	2–2	1–1
2001	R1	(Georgia (country)) WIT Georgia	(Austria) Ried	1–0	1–2
2001	R2	(Georgia (country)) WIT Georgia	(France) Troyes	1–1	0–6
2002	R1	(Georgia (country)) WIT Georgia	(Belgium) Lokeren	3–2	1–3
2003	R1	(Georgia (country)) WIT Georgia	(Austria) Pasching	2–1	0–1
2004	R1	(Georgia (country)) Dila Gori	(Bulgaria) Marek Dupnitsa	0–2	0–0
2005	R1	(Georgia (country)) WIT Georgia	(Hungary) Lombard-Pápa	0–1	1–2
2006	R1	(Georgia (country)) Dinamo Tbilisi	(Armenia) Kilikia	3–0	5–1
2006	R2	(Georgia (country)) Dinamo Tbilisi	(Austria) Ried	0–1	1–3
2007	R1	(Georgia (country)) Zestaponi	(Kazakhstan) Tobol	2–0	0–3
2008	R1	(Georgia (country)) Locomotive Tbilisi	(Luxembourg) Etzella Ettelbruck	2–2	0–0

== Georgian clubs versus country ==
As of 11 Aug 2026

Country	Played	W	D	L	GF	GA	GD	Ties won	Ties lost
Albania	19	9	3	7	32	22	+10	6	4
Andorra	2	2	0	0	7	0	+7	1	0
Armenia	18	10	3	5	30	17	+13	5	4
Austria	24	5	4	15	17	44	-27	2	10
Azerbaijan	20	7	2	11	22	35	-13	3	7
Belarus	12	6	1	5	14	18	-4	3	3
Bosnia and Herzegovina	2	0	2	0	3	3	0	1	0
Bulgaria	14	3	1	10	10	22	-12	2	5
Croatia	6	2	0	4	2	8	-6	1	2
Cyprus	15	3	0	12	9	31	-22	1	7
Czech Republic	10	1	1	8	7	23	-17	1	4
Denmark	12	5	2	5	19	20	-1	3	3
East Germany	1	1	0	0	2	1	+1		
England	9	2	1	6	10	20	-10	2	2
Estonia	14	8	3	3	29	16	+13	5	2
Faroe Islands	15	12	0	3	44	14	+30	7	1
Finland	3	0	1	2	0	4	-4	0	1
France	10	1	2	7	8	26	-18	1	3
Germany	10	2	2	6	10	20	-10	0	5
Greece	14	1	3	10	6	33	-27	1	5
Hungary	6	0	1	5	4	11	-7	0	3
Iceland	2	2	0	0	6	1	+5	1	0
Republic of Ireland	2	2	0	0	5	0	+5	1	0
Israel	7	1	2	4	5	15	-10	1	2
Italy	6	3	2	1	6	3	+3	2	1
Kazakhstan	22	4	6	12	17	34	-17	2	9
Latvia	4	1	1	2	7	7	+1	1	1
Liechtenstein	4	1	3	0	3	1	+2	2	0
Lithuania	2	1	0	1	5	7	-2	0	1
Luxembourg	10	6	4	0	18	9	+9	4	1
Macedonia	6	2	0	4	6	12	-6	1	2
Malta	7	2	2	3	10	8	+2	0	3
Moldova	12	7	0	5	19	16	+3	3	3
Montenegro	6	0	3	3	3	7	-4	0	3
Netherlands	10	2	2	6	8	21	-13	1	4
Northern Ireland	12	8	4	0	27	7	+20	5	1
Norway	2	1	1	0	2	1	+1	1	0
Poland	16	4	1	11	12	40	-28	2	6
Portugal	7	1	0	6	1	17	-16	0	3
Romania	12	5	3	4	14	16	-2	3	3
Russia	4	2	1	1	4	4	0	2	0
San Marino	6	4	1	1	15	2	+13	3	0
Scotland	4	0	1	3	3	13	-10	0	2
Serbia	13	4	1	8	12	30	-18	1	5
Slovakia	26	5	6	15	22	49	-27	3	10
Slovenia	4	0	2	2	1	5	-4	0	2
Spain	3	1	0	2	2	4	-2	0	2
Sweden	6	2	1	3	9	12	–3	1	2
Switzerland	4	1	0	3	2	9	-7	0	2
Turkey	6	0	3	3	2	6	-4	1	2
Ukraine	4	1	0	3	4	5	-1	1	1
Wales	5	3	0	2	10	3	+7	3	0
Yugoslavia	2	2	0	0	8	1	+7	1	0
