= Ramaz Shengelia =

Soviet and Georgian football player

Personal information
- Date of birth: 1 January 1957
- Place of birth: Kutaisi, Georgian SSR
- Date of death: 21 June 2012 (aged 55)
- Place of death: Tbilisi, Georgia
- Height: 1.73 m (5 ft 8 in)
- Position: Striker

Youth career
- 1968–1973: Torpedo Kutaisi

Senior career*
Years	Team	Apps	(Gls)
1973–1976	Torpedo Kutaisi	75	(29)
1977–1988	Dinamo Tbilisi	283	(120)
1989	IFK Holmsund	13	(2)
Total		371	(151)

International career
1976–1980	Soviet Union U21	13	(9)
1979–1983	Soviet Union	26	(10)
- * Club domestic league appearances and goals

Ramaz Shengelia (Georgian: რამაზ შენგელია; 1 January 1957 – 21 June 2012) was a Georgian and Soviet footballer who played as a striker.

== Club career ==
Born in Kutaisi, Shengelia started career in his hometown club Torpedo Kutaisi in 1968. He spent four seasons for the club, scoring 29 goals in 75 games in the Soviet First League. Shengelia became the top scorer of the club twice.

After the successful spell in the second strongest team in Georgian SSR, he was invited to Dinamo Tbilisi in 1977. The head coach of the Tbilisi-based club, Nodar Akhalkatsi arrived to Kutaisi in order to monitor the performance of Shengelia and his other teammate Tamaz Kostava. Both of them eventually signed for Dinamo for the following season.

During the debut years, Shengelia has to compete for the starting place with Revaz Chelebadze. However, Shengelia found his place in the team and became the top scorer of the club during 1978 season. Dinamo won the championship for the second time in history, while Shengelia was nominated as Soviet Footballer of the Year ahead of Oleg Blokhin (Dynamo Kyiv) and Georgi Yartsev (Spartak Moscow).

The season of 1981 was the most successful for Shengelia. Dinamo won UEFA Cup Winners' Cup, after defeating Carl Zeiss Jena in the final. Shengelia scored 4 goals during the tournament. At the end of the season he finished 7th in Ballon d'Or nominees. Two of his teammates were also the nominees for the title, as Aleksandre Chivadze finished 8th, while David Kipiani was 11th in the final ranking. Shengelia was again named Soviet Footballer of the Year in 1981.

During the following season, Dinamo lost in the semifinal of UEFA Cup Winners' Cup to Standard Liège. However, Shengelia became the topscorer of the tournament with six goals.

Shengelia retired from football in 1988, but he came out of retirement a year later, joining the Swedish club IFK Holmsund with his teammate Tengiz Sulakvelidze. Holmsund competed in the second tier of the championship. During the only season with the club, Shengelia scored 2 goals in 13 appearances.

== International career ==
Shengelia played in 26 games scoring 10 goals for the Soviet Union national team, including performance at the 1982 FIFA World Cup (five appearances, one goal). He also represented his country in five FIFA World Cup qualification matches.

== Later years ==
After the dissolution of the Soviet Union, Shengelia worked in the Georgia national team as an assistant of Aleksandre Chivadze. Later was invited to Georgian Football Federation by his former coach and then-president of the federation Nodar Akhalkatsi.

Shengelia died of a brain haemorrhage in Tbilisi in June 2012, at the age of 55.

The football stadium in his hometown Kutaisi is named after him.

== Career statistics ==
=== Club ===
Appearances and goals by club, season and competition
Club	Season	League		Cup		Europe (Note: Includes UEFA European Cup, UEFA Cup and UEFA Cup Winners' Cup.)		Other (Note: Includes other competitive competition USSR Federation Cup.)		Total	
Club	Season	Apps	Goals	Apps	Goals	Apps	Goals	Apps	Goals	Apps	Goals
Torpedo Kutaisi	1973	1	0	0	0	–		–		1	0
Torpedo Kutaisi	1974	14	2	0	0	–		–		14	2
Torpedo Kutaisi	1975	33	15	1	0	–		–		34	15
Torpedo Kutaisi	1976	27	12	0	0	–		–		27	12
Torpedo Kutaisi	Total	75	29	1	0	−	−	−	−	76	29
Dinamo Tbilisi	1977	24	5	1	0	5	2	–		29	7
Dinamo Tbilisi	1978	28	15	6	1	4	2	–		38	18
Dinamo Tbilisi	1979	29	8	8	3	4	1	–		41	12
Dinamo Tbilisi	1980	32	17	6	1	4	2	–		42	20
Dinamo Tbilisi	1981	31	23	1	1	9	7	2	4	43	36
Dinamo Tbilisi	1982	26	16	2	1	6	2	–		34	19
Dinamo Tbilisi	1983	27	11	1	0	0	0	–		28	11
Dinamo Tbilisi	1984	29	9	3	2	0	0	–		32	11
Dinamo Tbilisi	1985	22	6	1	0	0	0	–		23	6
Dinamo Tbilisi	1986	3	0	0	0	0	0	–		3	0
Dinamo Tbilisi	1987	27	9	4	3	6	3	2	1	39	16
Dinamo Tbilisi	1988	5	1	1	0	0	0	–		6	1
Dinamo Tbilisi	Total	283	120	34	12	38	19	2	1	357	156
Holmsund	1989	13	2	0	0	0	0	–		13	2
Career total		371	151	35	12	37	20	2	1	445	188

=== International ===
Scores and results list Soviet Union's goal tally first, score column indicates score after each Shengelia goal.

List of international goals scored by Ramaz Shengelia
No.	Date	Venue	Opponent	Score	Result	Competition
1	28 March 1979	Lokomotiv Republican Sports Complex, Simferopol, Soviet Union	Bulgaria	2–0	3–1	Friendly
2	19 April 1979	Dinamo Stadium, Tbilisi, Soviet Union	Sweden	1–0	2–0	Friendly
3	5 May 1979	Central Lenin Stadium, Moscow, Soviet Union	Czechoslovakia	2–0	3–0	Friendly
4	19 May 1979	Dinamo Stadium, Tbilisi, Soviet Union	Hungary	2–2	2–2	UEFA Euro 1980 qualifying
5	23 September 1981	Central Lenin Stadium, Moscow, Soviet Union	Turkey	4–0	4–0	1982 FIFA World Cup qualification
6	7 October 1981	Atatürk Stadium, İzmir, Turkey	Turkey	1–0	3–0	1982 FIFA World Cup qualification
7	28 October 1981	Dinamo Stadium, Tbilisi, Soviet Union	Czechoslovakia	1–0	2–0	1982 FIFA World Cup qualification
8	28 October 1981	Dinamo Stadium, Tbilisi, Soviet Union	Czechoslovakia	2–0	2–0	1982 FIFA World Cup qualification
9	5 May 1982	Central Lenin Stadium, Moscow, Soviet Union	East Germany	1–0	1–0	Friendly
10	22 June 1982	Estadio La Rosaleda, Málaga, Spain	Scotland	2–1	2–2	1982 FIFA World Cup

== Honours ==
=== Player ===
Dinamo Tbilisi

- Soviet Top League: 1978
- Soviet Cup: 1979
- UEFA Cup Winners' Cup: 1980–81

Soviet Union U21

- UEFA European Under-21 Championship: 1980

Individual

- Soviet Footballer of the Year (2): 1978, 1981
- Soviet Top League top scorer: 1981 (23 goals)
- UEFA Cup Winners' Cup top scorer: 1981–82 (6 goals)
- UEFA European Under-21 Championship top scorer: 1980
- Grigory Fedotov club member
- Merited Master of Sports (1981)
- The best 33 football players of the Soviet Union: 1st (1981); 2nd (1978, 1979, 1980); 3rd (1977)
- 1981 – 7th
