= FC Politehnica Timișoara in European football =

== Total statistics ==
Competition	S	P	W	D	L	GF	GA	GD
UEFA Champions League / European Cup	1	4	0	3	1	2	4	– 2
UEFA Cup Winners' Cup / European Cup Winners' Cup	2	6	3	0	3	5	11	– 6
UEFA Europa League / UEFA Cup	6	22	6	4	12	20	38	– 18
Total	9	32	9	7	16	27	53	– 26

== Statistics by country ==
Country	Club	P	W	D	L	GF	GA	GD
Belgium	R.S.C. Anderlecht	2	0	1	1	1	3	– 2
Subtotal		2	0	1	1	1	3	– 2
Croatia	GNK Dinamo Zagreb	2	1	0	1	2	4	– 2
Subtotal		2	1	0	1	2	4	– 2
England	Manchester City F.C.	2	0	0	2	0	3	– 3
England	West Ham United F.C.	2	1	0	1	1	4	– 3
Subtotal		4	1	0	3	1	7	– 6
Finland	MYPA	2	1	1	0	5	4	+ 1
Subtotal		2	1	1	0	5	4	+ 1
Germany / East Germany	1. FC Lokomotive Leipzig	2	1	0	1	2	5	– 3
Germany / East Germany	VfB Stuttgart	2	0	1	1	0	2	– 2
Subtotal		4	1	1	2	2	7	– 5
Hungary	Budapest Honvéd FC	2	1	0	1	2	4	– 2
Hungary	MTK Budapest FC	2	1	0	1	3	2	+ 1
Subtotal		4	2	0	2	5	6	– 1
Netherlands	AFC Ajax	2	0	1	1	1	2	– 1
Subtotal		2	0	1	1	1	2	– 1
Portugal	Sporting Clube de Portugal	2	1	0	1	2	7	– 5
Subtotal		2	1	0	1	2	7	– 5
Scotland	Celtic F.C.	2	1	0	1	2	2	0
Subtotal		2	1	0	1	2	2	0
Serbia	FK Partizan	2	0	0	2	1	3	– 2
Subtotal		2	0	0	2	1	3	– 2
Spain	Atlético Madrid	2	1	0	1	2	1	+ 1
Spain	Real Madrid C.F.	2	0	1	1	1	5	– 4
Subtotal		4	1	1	2	3	6	– 3
Ukraine	FC Shakhtar Donetsk	2	0	2	0	2	2	0
Subtotal		2	0	2	0	2	2	0
Total		32	9	7	16	27	53	– 26

== Statistics by competition ==
=== UEFA Champions League / European Cup ===
Season	Round	Country	Club	Home	Away	Aggregate
2009–10	Third qualifying round	Ukraine	Shakhtar Donetsk	0 – 0	2 – 2	(a) 2 – 2
2009–10	Play-off round	Germany	Stuttgart	0 – 2	0 – 0	0 – 2

=== UEFA Cup Winners' Cup / European Cup Winners' Cup ===
Season	Round	Country	Club	Home	Away	Aggregate
1980–81	First round	Scotland	Celtic	1 – 0	1 – 2	(a) 2 – 2
1980–81	Second round	England	West Ham United	1 – 0	0 – 4	1 – 4
1981–82	Preliminary round	East Germany	1. FC Lokomotive Leipzig	2 – 0	0 – 5	2 – 5

=== UEFA Europa League / UEFA Cup ===
Season	Round	Country	Club	Home	Away	Aggregate
1978–79	First round	Hungary	MTK Hungária FC	2 – 0	1 – 2	3 – 2
1978–79	Second round	Hungary	Budapest Honved FC	2 – 0	0 – 4	2 – 4
1990–91	First round	Spain	Atlético Madrid	2 – 0	0 – 1	2 – 1
1990–91	Second round	Portugal	Sporting CP	2 – 0	0 – 7	2 – 7
1992–93	First round	Spain	Real Madrid	1 – 1	0 – 4	1 – 5
2008–09	First round	Serbia	Partizan	1 – 2	0 – 1	1 – 3
2009–10	Group stage (A)	Netherlands	Ajax	1 – 2	0 – 0	4th place
2009–10	Group stage (A)	Croatia	Dinamo Zagreb	0 – 3	2 – 1	4th place
2009–10	Group stage (A)	Belgium	Anderlecht	0 – 0	1 – 3	4th place
2010–11	Third qualifying round	Finland	MYPA	3 – 3	2 – 1	5 – 4
2010–11	Play-off round	England	Manchester City	0 – 1	0 – 2	0 – 3
