= Wolfgang Schilling =

Wolfgang Schilling may refer to:

- Wolfgang Schilling (footballer, born 1955) (1955–2018), German footballer
- Wolfgang Schilling (footballer, born 1957), German footballer
