= Khizanishvili =

Khizanishvili (Georgian: ხიზანიშვილი) is a Georgian surname. Notable people with the surname include:

- Nodar Khizanishvili (born 1953), Soviet footballer
- Zurab Khizanishvili (born 1981), Georgian footballer and coach
