= David Kipiani =

Georgian footballer and manager

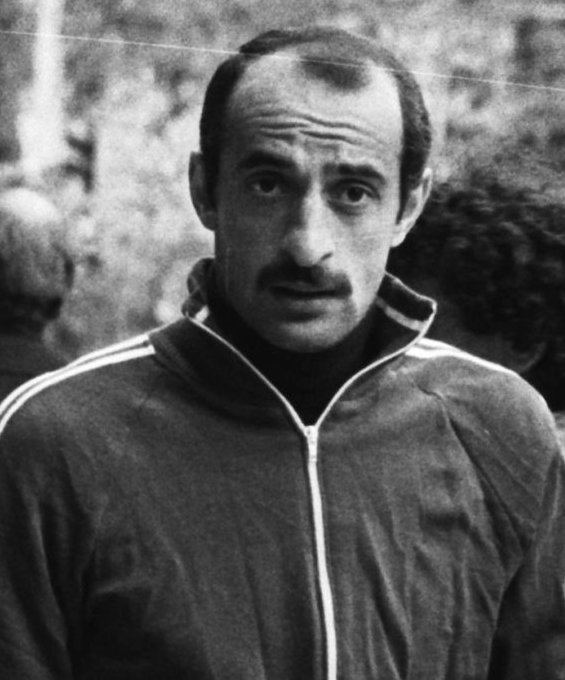
- Kipiani in 1981

Personal information
- Date of birth: 18 June 1951; According to Birth certificate (modified) 18 November 1951
- Place of birth: Tbilisi, USSR
- Date of death: 17 September 2001 (aged 50)
- Place of death: Tbilisi, Georgia
- Height: 1.84 m (6 ft 0 in)
- Position: Attacking midfielder

Youth career
- 1964–1966: School No. 35 Tbilisi
- 1967–1968: Dinamo Tbilisi

Senior career*
Years	Team	Apps	(Gls)
1968	Locomotive Tbilisi	1	(0)
1969	Dinamo Tbilisi	0	(0)
1970	Locomotive Tbilisi	28	(3)
1971–1982	Dinamo Tbilisi	245	(79)
Total		274	(82)

International career
1974–1981	USSR	19	(7)

Managerial career
- 1984–1985: Dinamo Tbilisi
- 1988: Dinamo Tbilisi
- 1990–1991: Dinamo Tbilisi
- 1992–1993: Olympiakos Nicosia
- 1995–1997: Dinamo Tbilisi
- 1997: Georgia
- 1998: Racing Mechelen
- 1998: Shinnik Yaroslavl
- 1999–2001: Torpedo Kutaisi
- 2000–2001: Georgia
- * Club domestic league appearances and goals

Olympic medal record

Representing USSR

Men's Football
Bronze medal – third place	1976 Montreal	Team competition

David Kipiani (Georgian: დავით ყიფიანი; 18 June 1951 – 17 September 2001) was a Georgian and Soviet football midfielder and manager, who played for the USSR national team. Kipiani principally played as a playmaker and is considered one of Georgia's greatest players. He was known for his elegant style of play, dribbling ability and passing range.

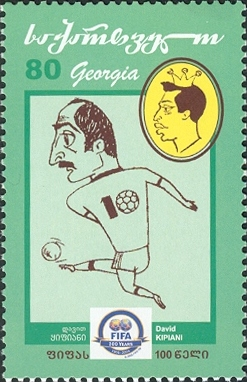
Kipiani on stamp of Georgia, 2004

== Playing career ==
Kipiani was born in Tbilisi, Georgian SSR. He started playing for the 35th School during the early stages of his career. Kipiani was invited to play for Dinamo Tbilisi in 1967. Due to injuries, he was only able to play one game in the next two seasons. So, Kipiani went to play for another Tbilisi-based club, Locomotive Tbilisi.

After a successful season with Locomotive, Kipiani was invited back to play for Dinamo again by Gavril Kachalin. Meanwhile, while playing for Locomotive, Kipiani worked with his future manager Nodar Akhalkatsi, under whose managing he later became one of the key figures of Dinamo Tbilisi, which were among the best clubs – presented not only at the highest level of Soviet football but internationally by the end of the 1970s and early 1980s. It was a time of the most significant results in the national championship along with the local and international recognition and notable achievements at various prestigious football tournaments.

During the period between 1975 and 1982, Kipiani was one of the prominent players on Dinamo Tbilisi, alongside others such as Manuchar Machaidze, Aleksandre Chivadze, Vladimir Gutsaev and Ramaz Shengelia. The Georgian team saw success against such football clubs as Liverpool, Inter Milan, Napoli, West Ham United, and Feyenoord, largely determined by their talent, unique playing abilities and individual skills, vision of the game, and by their complete interactions on the football pitch, where Kipiani was arguably the most dominant player.

== International career ==
Kipiani was capped 19 times for the Soviet Union, between April 1974 and May 1981, scoring seven goals. He made his international debut under manager Konstantin Beskov, in a friendly international match on 17 April 1974 in Zenica, when he was a second-half substitute for Vladimir Fedotov. Kipiani has scored his first international goal just after five minutes into his debut for the Soviet team, which became the only goal of the match and Soviet Union beat Yugoslavia 1–0. He played his last national team game on 30 May 1981 in a 1982 FIFA World Cup qualifier against Wales.

Kipiani was not given a chance to play in the World Cup finals. Many think his peak was in 1982, but he missed the Spain World Cup and quit playing altogether due to a severe leg injury sustained against Kuban Krasnodar on 26 April (Round 4).

== Managerial career ==
After retirement, Kipiani coached FC Dinamo Tbilisi, Torpedo Kutaisi, Shinnik Yaroslavl (Russia), Racing Mechelen (Belgium), Olympiakos Nicosia (Cyprus) and the Georgia national team.

== Death ==
He died in Tbilisi, Georgia from injuries sustained in a car crash near Tserovani (Mtskheta) on 17 September 2001. He was 50 years old. The Georgian Cup and the David Kipiani Stadium in the town of Gurjaani belong to Alazani Gurjaani, were named after him.

== Career statistics ==
=== Club ===
Appearances and goals by club, season and competition
Club	Season	League		Cup		Europe		Total	
Club	Season	Apps	Goals	Apps	Goals	Apps	Goals	Apps	Goals
Locomotive Tbilisi	1968	1	0	–	–	–	–	1	0
Dinamo Tbilisi	1969	–	–	–	–	–	–	–	–
Locomotive Tbilisi	1970	28	3	1	0	–	–	29	3
Dinamo Tbilisi	1971	23	3	1	0	–	–	24	3
Dinamo Tbilisi	1972	28	7	3	0	2	1	33	8
Dinamo Tbilisi	1973	20	5	3	0	5	3	28	8
Dinamo Tbilisi	1974	5	1	3	4	–	–	8	5
Dinamo Tbilisi	1975	24	12	2	1	–	–	26	13
Dinamo Tbilisi	1976	18	9	5	5	2	1	25	15
Dinamo Tbilisi	1977	27	14	–	–	5	2	32	16
Dinamo Tbilisi	1978	25	7	6	1	4	1	35	9
Dinamo Tbilisi	1979	22	3	2	1	4	2	28	6
Dinamo Tbilisi	1980	31	8	7	3	4	0	42	11
Dinamo Tbilisi	1981	18	8	1	0	5	0	24	8
Dinamo Tbilisi	1982	4	2	1	2	4	0	9	4
Dinamo Tbilisi	Total	245	79	34	17	35	10	314	106
Career total		274	82	35	17	35	10	344	109

=== International ===
Appearances and goals by national team and year
National team	Year	Apps	Goals
Soviet Union	1974	1	1
Soviet Union	1975	–	–
Soviet Union	1976	–	–
Soviet Union	1977	6	3
Soviet Union	1978	6	3
Soviet Union	1979	5	0
Soviet Union	1980	–	–
Soviet Union	1981	1	0
Total		19	7

== Honours ==
=== Player ===
Dinamo Tbilisi

- Soviet Top League: 1978
- Soviet Cup: 1976, 1979
- UEFA Cup Winners Cup: 1981

Soviet Union U18

- U-19 UEFA Championship: 1976

=== Manager ===
Dinamo Tbilisi

- Umaglesi Liga: 1990, 1994–95, 1995–96, 1996–97
- Georgian Cup: 1994–95, 1995–96, 1996–97

Torpedo Kutaisi

- Umaglesi Liga: 1999–2000, 2000–01
- Georgian Cup: 2000–01

=== Individual ===
- Soviet Footballer of the Year: 1977
- Grigory Fedotov club: 155 goals
