= David Kipiani Stadium =

Georgia sports stadium

- Interactive map of David Kipiani Stadium
- Location: Boris Paichadze St, 1500, Gurjaani, Georgia
- Coordinates: 41°45′21.6″N 45°47′50.2″E
- Owner: Alazani Gurjaani
- Operator: Alazani Gurjaani
- Capacity: 3000
- Field size: 105x68

David Kipiani Stadium is mainly used by the club Alazani Gurjaani it is located in Boris Paichadze St, 1500, Gurjaani, Georgia.The field was named in honour of David Kipiani.

== Description ==
David Kipiani Stadium is mainly used by the club Alazani Gurjaani. The biggest achievement was made in the 1992–93 season, when it took the 3rd place in the Umaglesi Liga. During that period the team was led by Otar Gabelia. The stadium is located in Boris Paichadze St, 1500, Gurjaani in Georgia and it was named in honour of David Kipiani.

== Matches ==
After the collapse of the Soviet Union, on 17 September 1992 was held the friendly match between Georgia and Azerbaijan ended 6–3 with 3000 attendances.

Date	Time	Team #1	Result	Team #2	Round	Attendance
17 September 1992	18:00	Georgia	6–3	Azerbaijan	Friendly	3000

== See also ==
- Alazani Gurjaani
