= Kostava =

Kostava is a surname. Notable people with the surname include:

- Guram Kostava (1937–2024), Soviet/Georgian fencer
- Merab Kostava (1939–1989), Georgian dissident, musician, and poet
- Tamaz Kostava (born 1956), Georgian football player
