= Zaur Svanadze =

Georgian footballer (born 1958)

Personal information
- Date of birth: 23 January 1958 (age 68)
- Place of birth: Kutaisi, Georgian SSR
- Height: 1.73 m (5 ft 8 in)
- Position: Midfielder

Team information
- Current team: Dinamo Tbilisi (assistant manager)

Youth career
- 1972–1976: Torpedo Kutaisi

Senior career*
Years	Team	Apps	(Gls)
1976–1980	Torpedo Kutaisi	158	(17)
1981–1989	Dinamo Tbilisi	245	(8)
1990	IFK Holmsund	24	(1)
1991	Umeå FC		
1991–1992	Motala AIF		
1993–1995	Gällivare Malmbergets FF		

Managerial career
- 1995–2000: Gällivare Malmbergets FF
- 2001–2002: Locomotive Tbilisi (assistant)
- 2002–2003: Locomotive Tbilisi
- 2005–2006: Dinamo Tbilisi (assistant)
- 2006–2008: Georgia (assistant)
- 2008–2009: Georgia U19
- 2009–2011: Georgia U21 (assistant)
- 2012–2015: Inter Baku (assistant)
- 2015–2017: Inter Baku
- 2018–2019: Dinamo Tbilisi
- 2019–: Dinamo Tbilisi (assistant)
- * Club domestic league appearances and goals

Zaur Svanadze (Georgian: ზაურ სვანაძე; born 23 January 1958) is a Georgian football manager and former player. He is the assistant manager of Dinamo Tbilisi.

== Playing career ==
Having spent some years in his hometown club Torpedo Kutaisi, Svanadze moved to Dinamo Tbilisi in 1981. He was one of the members of the famous Dinamo Tbilisi squad, which won UEFA Cup Winners' Cup back in 1980–81, being substituted by Nukri Kakilashvili in the final against Carl Zeiss Jena.

== Managing career ==
Svanadze worked at some Georgian clubs before moving to Azerbaijan.

He joined the coaching staff of Kakhaber Tskhadadze at Inter Baku in 2012, before taking charge at the club three years later, after Tskhadadze was appointed as the manager of Georgia national football team.

== Honours ==
Dinamo Tbilisi

- UEFA Cup Winners' Cup: 1980–81
