= Wolfgang Schilling (footballer, born 1957) =

East German footballer

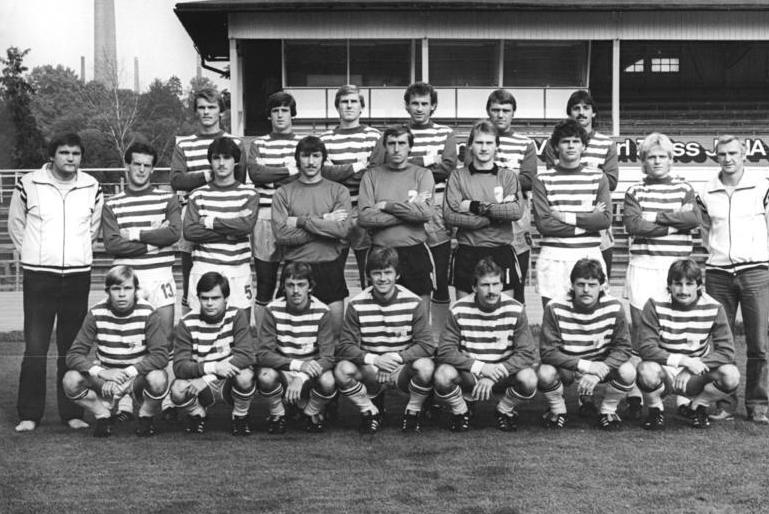
- Schilling; front row (kneeling), second from left

Personal information
- Full name: Wolfgang Schilling
- Date of birth: 18 March 1957 (age 69)
- Place of birth: East Germany
- Height: 1.70 m (5 ft 7 in)
- Position: Defender

Youth career
- –1968: BSG Chemie Jena
- 1968–1979: FC Carl Zeiss Jena

Senior career*
Years	Team	Apps	(Gls)
1979–1989	FC Carl Zeiss Jena	126	(5)
Total		126	(5)
- * Club domestic league appearances and goals

Wolfgang Schilling (born 18 March 1957) is a former professional East German footballer.

Schilling made 126 appearances in the DDR-Oberliga during his playing career.

== Honours ==
- 1980 – FDGB-Pokal winner
- 1981 – European Cup Winners' Cup runner-up
