= Otar Gabelia =

Georgian football manager (born 1953)

Personal information
- Full name: Otar Ambrosis dze Gabelia
- Date of birth: 24 March 1953 (age 73)
- Place of birth: Zugdidi, Georgian SSR, Soviet Union
- Height: 1.77 m (5 ft 10 in)
- Position: Goalkeeper

Youth career
- 1970–1971: Dinamo Zugdidi

Senior career*
Years	Team	Apps	(Gls)
1972–1973	Dinamo Sokhumi	41	(0)
1974–1976	Torpedo Kutaisi	109	(0)
1977–1982	Dinamo Tbilisi	129	(0)
1983–1984	Torpedo Kutaisi	29	(0)
1985–1990	Dinamo Tbilisi	142	(0)

International career
1979	USSR	1	(0)

Managerial career
- 1990–1992: Odishi Zugdidi
- 1992–1993: Alazani Gurjaani
- 1993–1995: Duruji Kvareli
- 1995–1996: Algeti Marneuli
- 1997–1999: TSU Tbilisi
- 2001–2002: Merani Tbilisi
- 2004–2005: Torpedo Kutaisi
- 2009–2011: Georgia U-21
- 2016: Zugdidi
- * Club domestic league appearances and goals

Otar Gabelia (Georgian: ოთარ ამბროსის ძე გაბელია; born 24 March 1953) is a Georgian football manager and a former player. He was a long-time goalkeeper for Dinamo Tbilisi. Winner of the Best Soviet Goalkeeper Award (1979), Gabelia is regarded by pundits as one of the best Georgian goalkeepers of all time.

== Club career ==
Gabelia spent his club career at Dinamo Zugdidi, playing from 1970 to 1971, at Dinamo Sokhumi, from 1972 to 1973, at Torpedo Kutaisi, from 1974 to 1976 and from 1983 to 1984, at Dinamo Tbilisi, from 1977 to 1982 and from 1985 to 1989.

He won the Soviet championship in 1978 and Soviet Cup in 1979 and was named Best Soviet Goalkeeper in 1979. He was known for his emotional style of play with excellent reaction.

In 1981 he won UEFA Cup Winners Cup, which was the biggest achievement of his sport career.

== International career ==
Gabelia played his only game for USSR on 21 November 1979 in a friendly against West Germany.

== Honours ==
Dinamo Tbilisi

- Soviet Top League: 1978
- Soviet Cup: 1979
- UEFA Cup Winners Cup: 1981

Individual

- Soviet Goalkeeper of the Year: 1979
