= Yuriy Makhynya =

Soviet and Ukrainian footballer

Personal information
- Full name: Yuriy Oleksandrovych Makhynya
- Date of birth: 1 January 1961 (age 65)
- Place of birth: Mykolaiv, Soviet Union (now Ukraine)
- Height: 1.75 m (5 ft 9 in)
- Position: Defender

Senior career*
Years	Team	Apps	(Gls)
1979	Kolos Poltava	30	(0)
1981–1984	Dynamo Kyiv	6	(0)
1985–1987	Metalist Kharkiv	72	(1)
1988	Tavriya Simferopol	17	(0)
1988	Bukovyna Chernivtsi	27	(0)
1988–1989	Chemlon Humenne		
1989	Bukovyna Chernivtsi	45	(3)
1989–1991	Chemlon Humenne		
1991–1992	Bukovyna Chernivtsi	47	(1)
1992–1993	Kremin Kremenchuk	28	(0)
- * Club domestic league appearances and goals

Yuriy Oleksandrovych Makhynya (Ukrainian: Юрій Олександрович Махиня; born 1 January 1961) is a Ukrainian retired professional footballer.

== Honours ==
- Soviet Top League champion: 1981.
- Soviet Top League runner-up: 1982.
- Soviet Cup winner: 1988 (played in the early stages of the 1987–88 tournament for FC Metalist Kharkiv).
- USSR Federation Cup finalist: 1987.
