= Steen Hansen (footballer) =

Danish footballer

Personal information
- Full name: Steen Nygaard Hansen
- Date of birth: 31 May 1960 (age 66)
- Place of birth: Nørrebro, Denmark
- Position: Centre-back

Senior career*
Years	Team	Apps	(Gls)
1979–1990	Hvidovre IF		

International career
1980–1981	Denmark U21	7	(0)
1981–1984	Denmark	4	(0)
- * Club domestic league appearances and goals

Steen Nygaard Hansen (born 31 May 1960) is a Danish former footballer who played as a centre-back. He made four appearances for the Denmark national team from 1981 to 1984.
