= Sergei Krestenenko =

Russian footballer (1956–2025)

Personal information
- Full name: Sergei Vasilyevich Krestenenko
- Date of birth: 25 June 1956
- Place of birth: Mizur, North Ossetian ASSR, Russian SFSR, USSR
- Date of death: 24 November 2025 (aged 69)
- Height: 1.82 m (6 ft 0 in)
- Position: Midfielder

Youth career
- Khimik Shebekino
- Salyut Belgorod

Senior career*
Years	Team	Apps	(Gls)
1973–1975	Salyut Belgorod		
1974	→ Torpedo Moscow		
1976	Dynamo Stavropol		
1976–1977	Dynamo Moscow		
1978–1980	Fakel Voronezh		
1979	→ Khimik Stepnogorsk		
1981	Spartak Moscow		
1981	Lokomotiv Moscow		
1982	Metalist Kharkov		
1983–1985	Strela Voronezh		
1988	Fakel Voronezh		
1989	FC Dynamo Belaya Tserkov		
1990–1993	Avtomobilist/Elektronika/Videofon Voronezh		

Managerial career
- 2003: Fakel Voronezh
- 2008: Fakel Voronezh
- * Club domestic league appearances and goals

Sergei Vasilyevich Krestenenko (Russian: Сергей Васильевич Крестененко, 25 June 1956 – 24 November 2025) was a Russian football player and manager. He died on 24 November 2025, at the age of 69.
