= Giorgi Tavadze =

Soviet-Georgian footballer

Personal information
- Full name: Giorgi Tavadze
- Date of birth: 21 June 1955 (age 71)
- Place of birth: Lanchkhuti, Georgian SSR
- Height: 1.73 m (5 ft 8 in)
- Position: Wing-back

Youth career
- 1972−1975: Guria Lanchkhuti

Senior career*
Years	Team	Apps	(Gls)
1976−1978	Guria Lanchkhuti	60	(3)
1978−1982	Dinamo Tbilisi	50	(3)
1983−1984	Torpedo Kutaisi	61	(2)
- * Club domestic league appearances and goals

Giorgi Tavadze (Georgian: გიორგი თავაძე; born 21 June 1955) is a Georgian former footballer.
