= Andreas Bielau =

East German footballer

- Bielau with FC Carl Zeiss Jena in 1982

Personal information
- Full name: Andreas Bielau
- Date of birth: 26 August 1958 (age 68)
- Place of birth: East Germany
- Position: Forward

Senior career*
Years	Team	Apps	(Gls)
1978–1980	BSG Sachsenring Zwickau	31	(5)
1980–1987	FC Carl Zeiss Jena	164	(42)
1987–1990	FSV Zwickau	74	(26)

International career
1981–1985	East Germany	9	(0)

Managerial career
- 1988–1990: VfB Auerbach
- * Club domestic league appearances and goals

Andreas Bielau (born 26 August 1958) is a German former footballer who played as a forward.

During his club career, Bielau played for BSG Sachsenring Zwickau and FC Carl Zeiss Jena in the East German top-flight. After retiring, he managed VfB Auerbach. He made 9 appearances for the East Germany national team.
