= 1980–81 European Cup Winners' Cup =

Tournament details
- Dates: 20 August 1980 – 13 May 1981
- Teams: 34

Final positions
- Champions: (Soviet Union) Dinamo Tbilisi (1st title)
- Runners-up: (East Germany) Carl Zeiss Jena

Tournament statistics
- Matches played: 65
- Goals scored: 176 (2.71 per match)
- Top scorer(s): David Cross (West Ham United); 6 goals

The 1980–81 season of the European Cup Winners' Cup was won by Dinamo Tbilisi in the final against Carl Zeiss Jena. Dinamo Tbilisi's side defeated English Second Division side West Ham United away before beating Carl Zeiss Jena in a final watched by 4,750 people in Düsseldorf. This win was the high point of the Georgian side and is still the club's greatest achievement.

The competition included the Real Madrid reserve team, Castilla CF, who qualified as the runners-up of the 1979–80 Copa del Rey.

== Preliminary round ==
Team 1	Agg.	Team 2	1st leg	2nd leg
Celtic (Scotland)	7–2	(Hungary) Diósgyőr	6–0	1–2
Altay (Turkey)	0–4	(Portugal) Benfica	0–0	0–4

=== First leg ===
20 August 1980

Celtic (Scotland)	6–0	(Hungary) Diósgyőr
McGarvey 52', 65', 70'; McCluskey 60', 79'; Sullivan 71'

Celtic Park, Glasgow
Attendance: 28,000
Referee: Widukind Herrmann (East Germany)

20 August 1980

Altay (Turkey)	0–0	(Portugal) Benfica

İzmir Atatürk Stadium, İzmir
Attendance: 22,000
Referee: Yordan Zhezhov (Bulgaria)

=== Second leg ===
3 September 1980

Diósgyőr (Hungary)	2–1	(Scotland) Celtic
Görgei 25' 66'		Nicholas 24'

Attendance: 8,000
Referee: Josef Bucek (Austria)

Celtic won 7–2 on aggregate.

3 September 1980

Benfica (Portugal)	4–0	(Turkey) Altay
Chalana 22'; Coelho 34'; Nené 63'; César 70'

Estádio da Luz, Lisbon
Attendance: 60,000
Referee: Robert Wurtz (France)

Benfica won 4–0 on aggregate.

== First round ==
Team 1	Agg.	Team 2	1st leg	2nd leg
Castilla CF (Spain)	4–6	(England) West Ham United	3–1	1–5 (aet)
Celtic (Scotland)	2–2 (a)	(Romania) Politehnica Timișoara	2–1	0–1
Hibernians (Malta)	1–4	(Republic of Ireland) Waterford	1–0	0–4
Kastoria (Greece)	0–2	(Soviet Union) Dinamo Tbilisi	0–0	0–2
Spora Luxembourg	0–12	(Czechoslovakia) Sparta Prague	0–6	0–6
Slavia Sofia (Bulgaria)	3–2	(Poland) Legia Warsaw	3–1	0–1
Hvidovre (Denmark)	3–0	(Iceland) Fram	1–0	2–0
Ilves (Finland)	3–7	(Netherlands) Feyenoord	1–3	2–4
Roma (Italy)	3–4	(East Germany) Carl Zeiss Jena	3–0	0–4
Valencia (Spain)	5–3	(France) Monaco	2–0	3–3
Sion (Switzerland)	1–3	(Norway) Haugar	1–1	0–2
Newport County (Wales)	4–0	(Northern Ireland) Crusaders	4–0	0–0
Omonia (Cyprus)	1–7	(Belgium) Waterschei Thor	1–3	0–4
Fortuna Düsseldorf (West Germany)	8–0	Austria Salzburg	5–0	3–0
Malmö (Sweden)	1–0	(Albania) Partizani Tirana	1–0	0–0
Dinamo Zagreb (Socialist Federal Republic of Yugoslavia)	0–2	(Portugal) Benfica	0–0	0–2

=== First leg ===
17 September 1980

Celtic (Scotland)	2–1	(Romania) Politehnica Timișoara
Nicholas 19', 43'	Report	Manea 78'

Celtic Park, Glasgow
Attendance: 30,000
Referee: Gerardus Johannes Maria Geurts (Netherlands)

17 September 1980

Roma (Italy)	3–0	(East Germany) Carl Zeiss Jena
Pruzzo 5'; Ancelotti 23'; Falcão 72'

Rome

17 September 1980

Kastoria (Greece)	0–0	(Soviet Union) Dinamo Tbilisi

Kaftanzoglio Stadium, Thessaloniki
Attendance: 15,000

17 September 1980

Hvidovre (Denmark)	1–0	(Iceland) Fram
Hansen 22' (pen.)	Report

Hvidovre Stadion, Hvidovre
Attendance: 1,636
Referee: Ulf Eriksson (Sweden)

17 September 1980

Dinamo Zagreb (Socialist Federal Republic of Yugoslavia)	0–0	(Portugal) Benfica

Stadion Maksimir, Zagreb
Attendance: 52,500
Referee: Horst Brummeier (Austria)

17 September 1980

Sion (Switzerland)	1–1	(Norway) Haugar
Brigger 65'	summary	41' Osborne

Stade Tourbillon, Sion
Attendance: 6,000
Referee: (Netherlands) Johannes Peters

=== Second leg ===
28 September 1980

Fram (Iceland)	0–2	(Denmark) Hvidovre
	Report	Ambrose 10'; Hansen 50' (pen.)

Laugardalsvöllur, Reykjavík
Attendance: 6,000
Referee: Kaare Lindboe (Norway)

Hvidovre won 3–0 on aggregate.

1 October 1980

Politehnica Timișoara (Romania)	1–0	(Scotland) Celtic
Păltinișanu 81'	Report

Stadionul 1 Mai, Timișoara
Attendance: 40,000
Referee: Nikos Lagogiannis (Greece)

2–2 on aggregate; Politehnica Timișoara won on away goals.

1 October 1980

Carl Zeiss Jena (East Germany)	4–0	(Italy) Roma
Krause 26'; Lindemann 38'; Bielau 71' 87'

Ernst-Abbe-Sportfeld, Jena

Carl Zeiss Jena won 4–3 on aggregate.

1 October 1980

Dinamo Tbilisi (Soviet Union)	2–0	(Greece) Kastoria
Shengelia 52'; Gutsaev 80'

Dynamo Lenin Stadium, Tbilisi
Attendance: 80,000

Dinamo Tbilisi won 2–0 on aggregate.

1 October 1980

Waterschei Thor (Belgium)	4–0	(Cyprus) Omonia
R. Janssen 17'; Plessers 65' (pen.); Van Poucke 68', 75'

André Dumont Stadium, Genk
Attendance: 18,500
Referee: Paul Rion (Luxembourg)

Waterschei Thor won 7–1 on aggregate.

1 October 1980

Benfica (Portugal)	2–0	(Socialist Federal Republic of Yugoslavia) Dinamo Zagreb
Nené 17'; César 56'

Estádio da Luz, Lisbon
Attendance: 50,000
Referee: Gianfranco Menegali (Italy)

Benfica won 2–0 on aggregate.

28 September 1980

Haugar (Norway)	2–0	(Switzerland) Sion
Nilsen 40'; Christophersen 47' (pen.)	summary

Haugesund Stadion, Haugesund
Attendance: 4,238
Referee: (Denmark) Erik Steen Jensen

Haugar won 3–1 on aggregate.

== Second round ==
Team 1	Agg.	Team 2	1st leg	2nd leg
West Ham United (England)	4–1	(Romania) Politehnica Timișoara	4–0	0–1
Waterford (Republic of Ireland)	0–5	(Soviet Union) Dinamo Tbilisi	0–1	0–4
Sparta Prague (Czechoslovakia)	2–3	(Bulgaria) Slavia Sofia	2–0	0–3
Hvidovre (Denmark)	1–3	(Netherlands) Feyenoord	1–2	0–1
Carl Zeiss Jena (East Germany)	3–2	(Spain) Valencia	3–1	0–1
Haugar (Norway)	0–6	(Wales) Newport County	0–0	0–6
Waterschei Thor (Belgium)	0–1	(West Germany) Fortuna Düsseldorf	0–0	0–1
Malmö (Sweden)	1–2	(Portugal) Benfica	1–0	0–2

=== First leg ===
22 October 1980

West Ham United (England)	4–0	(Romania) Politehnica Timișoara
Bonds 25'; Goddard 27'; Stewart 30' (pen.); Cross 83'	Report

Boleyn Ground, London
Attendance: 27,157
Referee: Heinz Fahnler (Austria)

22 October 1980

Waterford (Republic of Ireland)	0–1	(Soviet Union) Dinamo Tbilisi
		Shengelia 50'

Kilcohan Park, Waterford
Attendance: 5,000
Referee: Norbert Rolles (Luxembourg)

22 October 1980

Sparta Prague (Czechoslovakia)	2–0	(Bulgaria) Slavia Sofia
Vdovjak 14', 45'

Stadion Letná, Prague
Attendance: 12,000
Referee: Clive White (England)

22 October 1980

Hvidovre (Denmark)	1–2	(Netherlands) Feyenoord
Manniche 2'		Wijnstekers 32'; Bouwens 51'

Hvidovre Stadion, Copenhagen
Attendance: 3,292
Referee: Gwyn Owen (Wales)

22 October 1980

Carl Zeiss Jena (East Germany)	3–1	(Spain) Valencia
Sengewald 1'; Schnuphase 9' (pen.); Trocha 31'		Morena 69'

Ernst Abbe Sportfield, Jena
Attendance: 15,000
Referee: Roger Schoeters (Belgium)

22 October 1980

Haugar (Norway)	0–0	(Wales) Newport County

Haugesund Stadion, Haugesund
Attendance: 4,522
Referee: Hans Harrysson (Sweden)

22 October 1980

Waterschei Thor (Belgium)	0–0	(West Germany) Fortuna Düsseldorf

André Dumontstadion, Genk
Attendance: 20,000
Referee: Victoriano Sánchez Arminio (Spain)

22 October 1980

Malmö (Sweden)	1–0	(Portugal) Benfica
Andersson 49'

Malmö Stadion, Malmö
Attendance: 10,585
Referee: Siegfried Kirschen (East Germany)

=== Second leg ===
4 November 1980

Newport County (Wales)	6–0	(Norway) Haugar
Gwyther 12'; Lowndes 44'; Aldridge 56'; Tynan 61', 81'; Moore 70'

Somerton Park, Newport
Attendance: 8,855
Referee: C. G. McGrath (Republic of Ireland)

Newport County won 6–0 on aggregate.

5 November 1980

Politehnica Timișoara (Romania)	1–0	(England) West Ham United
Păltinișanu 54'	Report

Stadionul 1 Mai, Timișoara
Attendance: 25,000
Referee: Riccardo Lattanzi (Italy)

West Ham United won 4–1 on aggregate.

5 November 1980

Dinamo Tbilisi (Soviet Union)	4–0	(Republic of Ireland) Waterford
Daraselia 66', 79'; Chivadze 74'; Chilaia 87'

Lenin Dinamo Stadium, Tbilisi
Attendance: 50,000
Referee: Iordan Zhezhov (Bulgaria)

Dinamo Tbilisi 5–0 on aggregate.

5 November 1980

Slavia Sofia (Bulgaria)	3–0	(Czechoslovakia) Sparta Prague
Velichkov 38'; Zhelyazkov 41'; Tsvetkov 45'

Slavia Stadium, Sofia
Attendance: 5,000
Referee: Nicolae Rainea (Romania)

Slavia Sofia won 3-2 on aggregate.

5 November 1980

Feyenoord (Netherlands)	1–0	(Denmark) Hvidovre
Nielsen 36'

De Kuip, Rotterdam
Attendance: 3,292
Referee: Anders Mattsson (Finland)

Feyenoord won 3–1 on aggregate.

5 November 1980

Valencia (Spain)	1–0	(East Germany) Carl Zeiss Jena
Botubot 61'

Mestalla Stadium, Valencia
Attendance: 35,000
Referee: Michel Vautrot (France)

Carl Zeiss Jena won 3–2 on aggregate.

5 November 1980

Fortuna Düsseldorf (West Germany)	1–0	(Belgium) Waterschei Thor
Bansemer 5'

Rheinstadion, Düsseldorf
Attendance: 12,700
Referee: Jakob Baumann (Switzerland)

Fortuna Düsseldorf won 1-0 on aggregate.

5 November 1980

Benfica (Portugal)	2–0	(Sweden) Malmö
Nené 57' (pen.), 60' (pen.)

Estádio da Luz, Lisbon
Attendance: 70,000
Referee: Ian Foote (Scotland)

Benfica won 2–1 on aggregate.

== Quarter-finals ==
Team 1	Agg.	Team 2	1st leg	2nd leg
West Ham United (England)	2–4	(Soviet Union) Dinamo Tbilisi	1–4	1–0
Slavia Sofia (Bulgaria)	3–6	(Netherlands) Feyenoord	3–2	0–4
Carl Zeiss Jena (East Germany)	3–2	(Wales) Newport County	2–2	1–0
Fortuna Düsseldorf (West Germany)	2–3	(Portugal) Benfica	2–2	0–1

=== First leg ===
4 March 1981

West Ham United (England)	1–4	(Soviet Union) Dinamo Tbilisi
Cross 54'		Chivadze 24'; Gutsaev 31'; Shengelia 55', 67'

Boleyn Ground, London
Attendance: 34,957
Referee: António Garrido (Portugal)

4 March 1981

Slavia Sofia (Bulgaria)	3–2	(Netherlands) Feyenoord
Tsvetkov 8' (pen.), 63'; Minchev 64'		Nielsen 20'; Vermeulen 78'

Slavia Stadium, Sofia
Attendance: 7,000
Referee: Paolo Bergamo (Italy)

4 March 1981

Carl Zeiss Jena (East Germany)	2–2	(Wales) Newport County
Raab 22', 85'		Tynan 40', 90'

Ernst Abbe Sportfield, Jena
Attendance: 16,000
Referee: Reidar Bjørnestad (Norway)

4 March 1981

Fortuna Düsseldorf (West Germany)	2–2	(Portugal) Benfica
Wenzel 2'; Dusend 39'		Carlos Manuel 35'; Coelho 77'

Rheinstadion, Düsseldorf
Attendance: 32,000
Referee: Edvard Sostarić (Yugoslavia)

=== Second leg ===
18 March 1981

Dinamo Tbilisi (Soviet Union)	0–1	(England) West Ham United
		Pearson 87'

Lenin Dinamo Stadium, Tbilisi
Attendance: 90,000
Referee: Walter Eschweiler (West Germany)

Dinamo Tbilisi won 4–2 on aggregate.

18 March 1981

Feyenoord (Netherlands)	4–0	(Bulgaria) Slavia Sofia
Notten 18'; Van Deinsen 48'; Vermeulen 77', 85'

De Kuip, Rotterdam
Attendance: 25,000
Referee: Siegfried Kirschen (East Germany)

Feyenoord won 6–3 on aggregate.

18 March 1981

Newport County (Wales)	0–1	(East Germany) Carl Zeiss Jena
		Kurbjuweit 27'

Somerton Park, Newport
Attendance: 18,000
Referee: Henning Lund-Sørensen (Denmark)

Carl Zeiss Jena won 3–2 on aggregate.

18 March 1981

Benfica (Portugal)	1–0	(West Germany) Fortuna Düsseldorf
Chalana 87'

Estádio da Luz, Lisbon
Attendance: 80,000
Referee: Jan Keizer (Netherlands)

Benfica won 3–2 on aggregate.

== Semi-finals ==
Team 1	Agg.	Team 2	1st leg	2nd leg
Dinamo Tbilisi (Soviet Union)	3–2	(Netherlands) Feyenoord	3–0	0–2
Carl Zeiss Jena (East Germany)	2–1	(Portugal) Benfica	2–0	0–1

=== First leg ===
8 April 1981

Dinamo Tbilisi (Soviet Union)	3–0	(Netherlands) Feyenoord
Sulakvelidze 23', 51'; Gutsaev 30'

Lenin Dinamo Stadium, Tbilisi
Attendance: 80,000
Referee: Erik Fredriksson (Sweden)

8 April 1981

Carl Zeiss Jena (East Germany)	2–0	(Portugal) Benfica
Bielau 8'; Raab 15'

Ernst Abbe Sportfield, Jena
Attendance: 18,000
Referee: Enzo Barbaresco (Italy)

=== Second leg ===
22 April 1981

Feyenoord (Netherlands)	2–0	(Soviet Union) Dinamo Tbilisi
Bouwens 43'; Notten 56'

De Kuip, Rotterdam
Attendance: 24,000
Referee: Franz Wöhrer (Austria)

Dinamo Tbilisi won 3–2 on aggregate.

22 April 1981

Benfica (Portugal)	1–0	(East Germany) Carl Zeiss Jena
Reinaldo 59'

Estádio da Luz, Lisbon
Attendance: 70,000
Referee: Pat Partridge (England)

Carl Zeiss Jena won 2–1 on aggregate.

== Final ==
13 May 1981

Dinamo Tbilisi (Soviet Union)	2–1	(East Germany) FC Carl Zeiss Jena
Gutsaev 67'; Daraselia 86'	(Report) (Report 2)	Hoppe 63'

Rheinstadion, Düsseldorf
Attendance: 4,750
Referee: Riccardo Lattanzi (Italy)

== See also ==
- 1980–81 European Cup
- 1980–81 UEFA Cup
