= Tengiz Sulakvelidze =

Georgian footballer (born 1956)

Personal information
- Date of birth: 23 July 1956 (age 70)
- Place of birth: Kutaisi, Georgian SSR, Soviet Union
- Height: 1.78 m (5 ft 10 in)
- Position: Defender

Senior career*
Years	Team	Apps	(Gls)
1974–1978	Torpedo Kutaisi	138	(2)
1978–1988	Dinamo Tbilisi	279	(21)
1989	IFK Holmsund	14	(1)
Total		431	(24)

International career
1980–1988	Soviet Union	49	(1)
Medal record
Men's Football
Bronze medal – third place	1980 Moscow	Team
- * Club domestic league appearances and goals

Tengiz Grigoriyevich Sulakvelidze (Georgian: თენგიზ სულაქველიძე; born 23 July 1956) is a Georgian former professional footballer who played as a defender.

== International career ==
Sulakvelidze made his debut for the Soviet Union on 26 March 1980 in a friendly against Bulgaria. He went on to play in the 1982 FIFA World Cup and UEFA Euro 1988. He scored a goal in a UEFA Euro 1988 qualifier against Iceland.

== Honours ==
Dinamo Tbilisi

- Soviet Top League: 1978
- Soviet Cup: 1979
- UEFA Cup Winners' Cup: 1980–81

Soviet Union

- UEFA European Championship silver medalist: 1988

Individual

- International Master of Sports: 1980
- Honored Master of Sports of the USSR: 1981
- Olympic bronze medalist: 1980
