= Tamaz Kostava =

Soviet footballer (born 1956)

Personal information
- Full name: Tamaz Giviyevich Kostava
- Date of birth: 29 February 1956 (age 70)
- Place of birth: Kutaisi, Georgian SSR
- Position: Defender

Senior career*
Years	Team	Apps	(Gls)
1973–1976	Torpedo Kutaisi	106	(0)
1977–1982	Dinamo Tbilisi	102	(1)
1983–1984	Torpedo Kutaisi	58	(0)

International career
1978	USSR	3	(1)
- * Club domestic league appearances and goals

Tamaz Giviyevich Kostava (Russian: Тамаз Гивиевич Костава; born 29 February 1956) is a Georgian former footballer who played as a defender. He made three appearance for the USSR national team, scoring once.

== International career ==
Kostava made his debut for USSR on 19 November 1978 in a friendly against Japan. In fact, all of the national team games he played in were against Japan (USSR played three friendlies against them in eight days).

== Honours ==
Dinamo Tbilisi

- Soviet Top League: 1978
- Soviet Cup: 1979
- UEFA Cup Winners' Cup: 1980–81
