= 1978 Soviet Top League =

41st season of top-tier football league in Soviet Union

Soviet Top League
- Season: 1978
- Champions: Dinamo Tbilisi
- Relegated: Dnepr Dnepropetrovsk
- European Cup: Dinamo Tbilisi
- Cup Winners' Cup: Dinamo Moscow
- UEFA Cup: Dinamo Kiev; Shakhter Donetsk
- Matches: 240
- Goals: 560 (2.33 per match)
- Top goalscorer: (19) Georgi Yartsev (Spartak)

Statistics of Soviet Top League for the 1978 season.

== Overview ==
It was contested by 16 teams, and Dinamo Tbilisi won the championship.

Introduction of draw limit, a number of games tied during a season.

== League standings ==
Pos	Team	Pld	W	D	L	GF	GA	GD	Pts	Qualification or relegation
1	(Georgian Soviet Socialist Republic) Dinamo Tbilisi (C)	30	17	8	5	45	24	+21	42	Qualification for European Cup first round
2	(Ukrainian Soviet Socialist Republic) Dynamo Kyiv	30	15	9	6	42	20	+22	38 (Note: 1 point deducted (8 draw limit).)	Qualification for UEFA Cup first round
3	(Ukrainian Soviet Socialist Republic) Shakhtar Donetsk	30	16	5	9	42	31	+11	37	Qualification for UEFA Cup first round
4	(Russian Soviet Federative Socialist Republic) Dynamo Moscow	30	14	10	6	37	23	+14	36 (Note: 2 points deducted (8 draw limit).)	Qualification for Cup Winners' Cup first round
5	(Russian Soviet Federative Socialist Republic) Spartak Moscow	30	14	5	11	42	33	+9	33	
6	(Russian Soviet Federative Socialist Republic) CSKA Moscow	30	14	4	12	36	40	−4	32	
7	(Ukrainian Soviet Socialist Republic) Chornomorets Odessa	30	12	10	8	41	26	+15	32	
8	(Russian Soviet Federative Socialist Republic) Torpedo Moscow	30	11	11	8	36	29	+7	30 (Note: 3 points deducted (8 draw limit).)	
9	(Ukrainian Soviet Socialist Republic) Zaria Voroshilovgrad	30	9	8	13	38	44	−6	26	
10	(Russian Soviet Federative Socialist Republic) Zenit Leningrad	30	9	8	13	31	46	−15	26	
11	(Uzbek Soviet Socialist Republic) Pakhtakor Tashkent	30	9	8	13	42	43	−1	26	
12	(Kazakh Soviet Socialist Republic) Kairat Alma-Ata	30	9	7	14	29	41	−12	25	
13	(Azerbaijan Soviet Socialist Republic) Neftchi Baku	30	8	7	15	28	39	−11	23	
14	(Armenian Soviet Socialist Republic) Ararat Yerevan	30	8	6	16	20	42	−22	22	
15	(Russian Soviet Federative Socialist Republic) Lokomotiv Moscow	30	7	9	14	26	40	−14	22	
16	(Ukrainian Soviet Socialist Republic) Dnipro Dnipropetrovsk (R)	30	9	3	18	25	39	−14	21	Relegation to First League

(C) Champions; (R) Relegated

== Results ==
Home \ Away	ARA	CHO	CSK	DNI	DYK	DYN	DTB	KAI	LOK	NEF	PAK	SHA	SPA	TOR	ZAR	ZEN
Ararat Yerevan		0–2	3–0	1–0	1–4	1–4	0–0	1–0	1–1	1–0	1–0	1–1	1–0	0–1	2–2	0–0
Chornomorets Odessa	3–1		4–0	2–0	0–0	0–1	0–1	1–1	0–1	1–0	4–1	1–0	2–1	2–1	1–1	3–0
CSKA Moscow	2–1	2–1		1–0	0–1	2–4	1–2	2–0	2–1	1–1	3–1	1–0	1–2	2–1	2–1	2–1
Dnipro Dnipropetrovsk	0–1	1–0	1–2		1–0	1–0	0–1	2–0	1–0	3–1	0–1	1–2	0–2	2–0	0–2	2–1
Dynamo Kyiv	3–0	0–0	0–0	5–1		1–0	1–0	3–0	3–1	1–1	2–2	1–2	3–0	0–2	4–1	1–0
Dynamo Moscow	1–1	2–3	1–2	1–0	0–0		1–1	2–0	3–1	1–0	1–0	2–1	0–0	0–1	2–1	3–1
Dinamo Tbilisi	3–0	2–1	4–1	1–0	1–0	1–1		1–0	2–0	1–0	3–0	1–1	2–0	2–2	4–1	3–1
Kairat Alma-Ata	2–0	1–1	1–0	1–0	0–0	1–0	1–2		2–2	0–0	3–2	0–1	0–1	2–2	2–1	3–2
Lokomotiv Moscow	2–1	0–3	1–1	1–0	1–1	0–1	0–0	0–2		2–1	3–2	2–0	0–1	0–0	1–1	0–0
Neftçi Baku	2–0	0–0	2–1	4–1	0–1	1–1	3–3	1–0	2–0		0–2	1–0	3–1	0–0	2–1	0–1
Pakhtakor Tashkent	2–0	1–1	1–0	1–1	1–1	0–0	3–0	1–0	1–1	5–1		2–1	1–3	1–1	0–1	3–0
Shakhtar Donetsk	2–0	3–1	1–2	2–1	2–0	1–1	1–1	1–3	2–1	3–1	2–1		1–0	2–1	2–0	1–0
Spartak Moscow	3–0	1–1	1–2	1–0	0–2	1–2	2–1	4–1	1–0	5–1	2–1	2–0		0–1	4–1	1–1
Torpedo Moscow	1–0	2–2	0–0	1–2	1–2	0–0	1–0	4–0	2–1	1–0	1–1	1–2	2–2		2–0	3–0
Zaria Voroshilovgrad	1–0	2–1	1–0	2–2	1–2	0–1	1–2	2–2	1–2	1–0	2–1	2–2	0–0	3–0		4–0
Zenit Leningrad	0–1	0–0	2–1	2–2	1–0	1–1	1–0	2–1	3–1	1–0	5–4	0–3	3–1	1–1	1–1	

Legend: Blue = home team win; Yellow = draw; Red = away team win.

== Top scorers ==
19 goals

- Georgi Yartsev (Spartak Moscow)

15 goals

- Ramaz Shengelia (Dinamo Tbilisi)

13 goals

- Oleg Blokhin (Dynamo Kyiv)

11 goals

- Nikolai Latysh (Shakhtar)

10 goals

- Vladimir Klementyev (Zenit)

9 goals

- Nikolai Kolesov (Dynamo Moscow)

8 goals

- Aleksei Belenkov (CSKA Moscow)
- Vakhtang Koridze (Dinamo Tbilisi)
- Viktor Kuznetsov (Zorya Voroshylovhrad)

7 goals

- Konstantin Bakanov (Pakhtakor)
- Anatoliy Banishevskiy (Neftchi)
- Yuri Chesnokov (CSKA Moscow)
- Vladimir Fyodorov (Pakhtakor)
- Yevgeni Khrabrostin (Torpedo Moscow)
- David Kipiani (Dinamo Tbilisi)
- Aleksandr Maksimenkov (Dynamo Moscow)
- Vladimir Onischenko (Dynamo Kyiv)
- Vladimir Ploskina (Chornomorets)
- Andrei Redkous (Zenit)
- Yuri Reznik (Shakhtar)
- Vitaliy Shevchenko (Chornomorets)
- Vitali Starukhin (Shakhtar)

== Attendances ==
No.	Club	Average
1	Dinamo Tbilisi	56,867
2	Shakhtar Donetsk	27,133
3	Chornomorets	23,000
4	Spartak Moscow	22,800
5	Dynamo Kyiv	21,107
6	Paxtakor	18,533
7	Zenit	17,133
8	Kairat	16,800
9	Neftçhi	15,133
10	Dnipro	14,067
11	Zorya	12,267
12	Torpedo Moscow	12,253
13	Ararat	10,033
14	Dynamo Moscow	8,987
15	PFC CSKA	7,627
16	Lokomotiv Moscow	6,253
