= Nodar Khizanishvili =

Soviet and Georgian footballer

Personal information
- Full name: Nodar Khizanishvili
- Date of birth: 31 January 1953 (age 73)
- Place of birth: Batumi, Adjar ASSR, Georgian SSR, Soviet Union
- Position: Defender

Senior career*
Years	Team	Apps	(Gls)
1972–1973	FC Dinamo Batumi		
1973–1982	FC Dinamo Tbilisi	160	(0)
1983	FC Torpedo Kutaisi	6	(0)

International career
1982	USSR	1	(0)
- * Club domestic league appearances and goals

Nodar Khizanishvili (Georgian: ნოდარ ხიზანიშვილი; born 31 January 1953) is a retired Soviet football player of Georgian ethnicity. He is the father of Zurab Khizanishvili.

== Honours ==
- Soviet Top League winner: 1978
- Soviet Cup winner: 1976, 1979
- UEFA Cup Winners' Cup winner: 1981

== International career ==
He played his only game for USSR on 14 April 1982 in a friendly against Argentina, coming on for the final eight minutes in place of Leonid Buryak.
