= Vladimir Gutsaev =

Soviet-Georgian football coach and politician

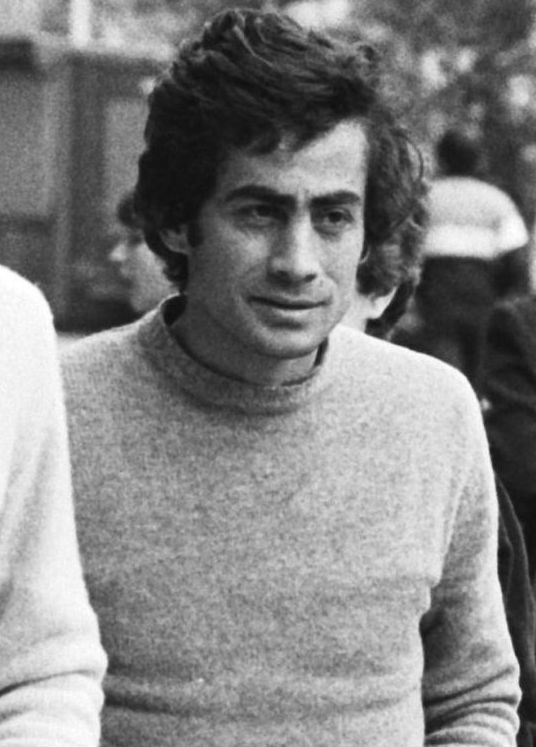
- Gutsaev in 1981

Personal information
- Full name: Vladimir Gavrilovich Gutsaev
- Date of birth: 21 December 1952 (age 73)
- Place of birth: Tbilisi, USSR
- Height: 1.73 m (5 ft 8 in)
- Position: Striker

Youth career
- 1966–1969: FC Norchi Dinamoeli
- 1969–1971: FShM Tbilisi

Senior career*
Years	Team	Apps	(Gls)
1971–1986	Dinamo Tbilisi	303	(47)

International career
1972–1982	USSR	11	(1)

Managerial career
- 1991–1994: Anorthosis Famagusta
- 1996: Georgia U-21
- 1997–1999: Georgia
- 1999–2000: Alania Vladikavkaz
- 2011–2012: WIT Georgia-2
- * Club domestic league appearances and goals

Vladimir Gutsaev (Georgian: ვლადიმერ გუცაევი, Russian: Владимир Гаврилович Гуцаев, Vladimir Gavrilovich Gutsayev; born 21 December 1952) is a retired Soviet and Georgian footballer and coach of Ossetian ethnicity. He was a member of the Parliament of Georgia from the ruling United National Movement party from 2004 to 2008.

== Football career ==
Debuting in FC Dinamo Tbilisi in 1971, he played as a striker for this club until 1986 as well as for the USSR national football team between 1972 and 1982. He is best remembered for his goal against FC Carl Zeiss Jena in the 1981 UEFA Cup Winners' Cup Final which ended in victory for FC Dinamo Tbilisi. His other achievements include winning the championship of the Soviet Union in 1978 and the Soviet Cup in 1976 and 1979. He retired in 1986, having played more than 300 matches and having scored almost 50 goals in the Soviet football competitions. Gutsaev then worked as a head coach for the Cypriot Anorthosis Famagusta FC (1991–94), the Georgia national football team (1997–99), and the Russian FC Alania Vladikavkaz (1999–2000).

== Political career ==
In March 2004, he was elected to the Parliament of Georgia from Mikheil Saakashvili's United National Movement party list and has since been a member of a Parliamentary Committee for Education, Science, Culture and Sports. In July 2004, Eduard Kokoity, the leader of Georgia's breakaway South Ossetia, accused Gutsaev of having offered him 20 million USD in exchange of his "loyalty" to the Georgian government. Gutsaev dismissed Kokoity's claims as an attempt to "garner political points" and said that his only mission to Kokoity was to persuade him to allow a South Ossetian football team to take part in the Georgian national championship.

== See also ==
- List of one-club men in association football
