= List of ship launches in 1668 =

The list of ship launches in 1668 includes a chronological list of some ships launched in 1668.

Date	Ship	Class	Builder	Location	Country	Notes
1 February	Royal Louis	First rate ship of the line	Rodolphe Gédéon	Toulon	Kingdom of France	For French Navy.
10 March	Charles	First rate ship of the line	Deptford Dockyard	Deptford	England	For Royal Navy.
29 March	Dauphin Royal	First rate ship of the line		Toulon	Kingdom of France	For French Navy.
28 April	Monarque	Second rate ship of the line	Laurent Coulomb	Toulon	Kingdom of France	For French Navy.
April	Dieppoise	Dieppoise-class frigate		Dieppe	Kingdom of France	For French Navy.
April	Gaillarde	Dieppoise-class frigate		Dieppe	Kingdom of France	For French Navy.
April	Providence	Fireship			England	For Royal Navy.
7 May	Emperor Leopold	Ship of the Line		Hamburg	Hamburg	For Admiralty of Hamburg.
May	Oryol	Sixth rate frigate		Dedinovo	Russia	For Imperial Russian Navy.
31 July	Kronan	First rate ship of the line	Francis Sheldon	Stockholm	Sweden	For Royal Swedish Navy.
11 September	Rouen	Third rate ship of the line	Jean Esnault	Le Havre	Kingdom of France	For French Navy.
21 December	Bombay Merchant	East Indiaman	William Castle	London	England	For British East India Company.
22 December	Nonsuch	Fifth rate frigate	Portsmouth Dockyard	Portsmouth	England	For Royal Navy.
December	Royal Duc	First rate ship of the line		Brest	Kingdom of France	For French Navy.
Unknown date	Bommel	Fifth rate		Dunkerque	Kingdom of France	For Dutch Republic Navy.
Unknown date	Edgar	Third rate ship of the line	Baylie	Bristol	England	For Royal Navy.
Unknown date	Galant	Fourth rate ship of the line	Laurent Hubac	Brest	Kingdom of France	For French Navy.
Unknown date	Fleuron	Fourth rate ship of the line	Laurent Hubac	Brest	Kingdom of France	For French Navy.
Unknown date	Leopoldus Primus	Fourth rate ship of the line	Admiralitätswerft	Hamburg	Hamburg	For Admiralty of Hamburg.
Unknown date	Levrier	Privateer		Dunkerque	Kingdom of France	For Jacques de Clerk.
Unknown date	Nuestra Señora de la Almudena	Ship of the line			Spain	For Spanish Navy.
Unknown date	Santa Ana	Third rate ship of the line			Spain	For Spanish Navy.
Unknown date	Suriname	Sixth rate		Zeeland	Dutch Republic	For Dutch Republic Navy.
Unknown date	Leiden	Fourth rate			Dutch Republic	For Dutch Republic Navy.
