= Battle of Texel =

1673 battle of the Franco-Dutch War and Third Anglo-Dutch War

Coordinates: 53.1500°N 4.6000°E

- Part of the Franco-Dutch War and Third Anglo-Dutch War
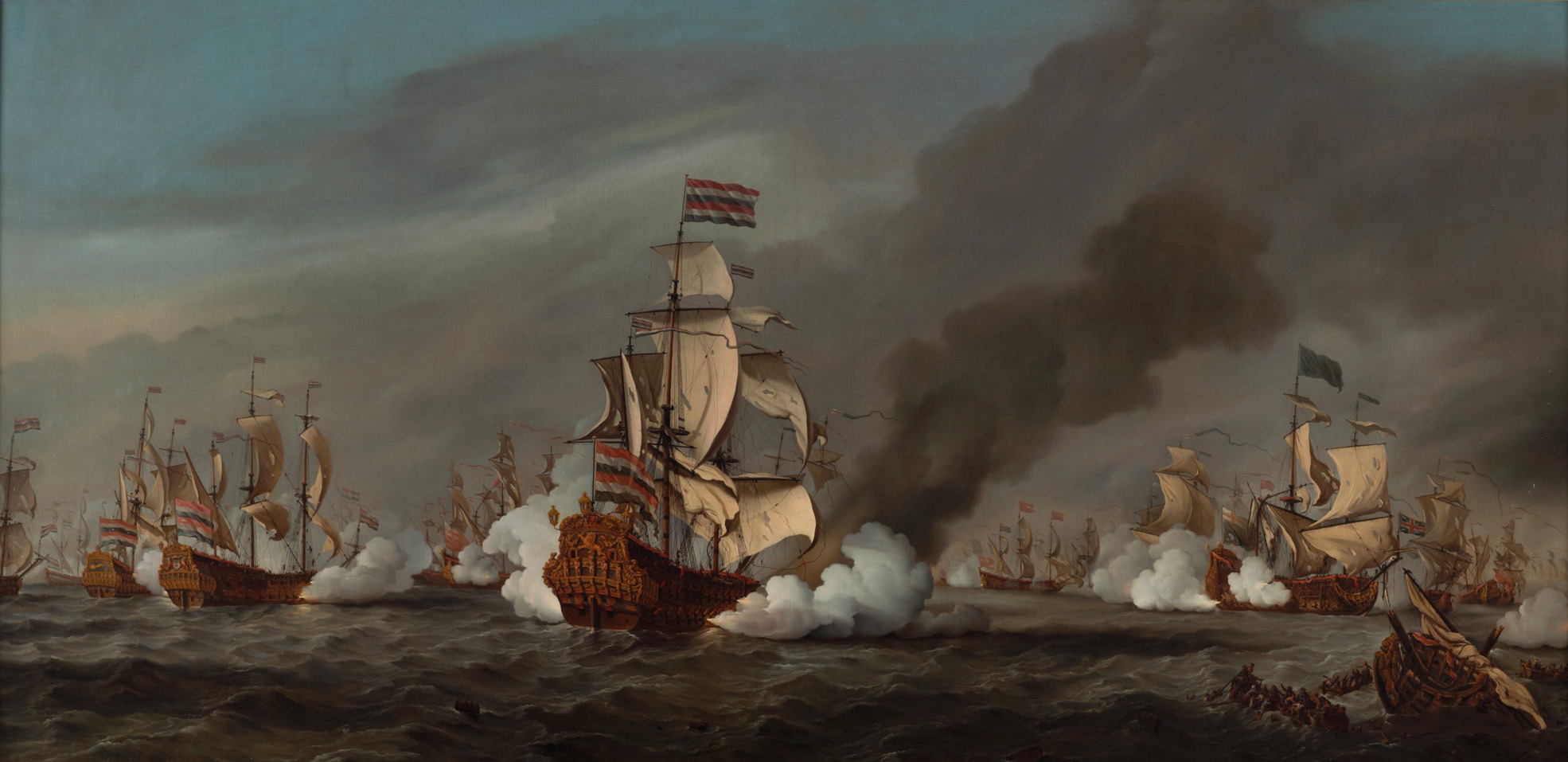
- 1687 painting of the battle
Date	21 August [O.S. 11 August] 1673
Location	Off Kijkduin, North Sea
Result	Dutch victory

Belligerents
Dutch Republic	England; France

Commanders and leaders
Michiel de Ruyter; Cornelis Tromp; Adriaen Banckert	Prince Rupert; Edward Spragge †; Jean d'Estrées

Strength
60 ships of the line; 15 frigates; 22 fireships; 4,245 guns 20,000 men	~100 ships of the line and frigates; 28 fireships; Circa 6,000 guns 32,000 men

Casualties and losses
1,000 killed	2,000 killed

The naval Battle of Texel or Battle of Kijkduin took place off the western coast of the island of Texel on 21 August 1673 (11 August O.S.) between the Dutch and the combined English and French fleets. It was the last major battle of the Third Anglo-Dutch War, which was itself part of the Franco-Dutch War (1672–1678), during which Louis XIV of France invaded the Republic and sought to establish control over the Spanish Netherlands. English involvement came about because of the Treaty of Dover, secretly concluded by Charles II of England, and which was highly unpopular with the English Parliament.

The overall commanders of the English and Dutch military forces were Lord High Admiral James, Duke of York, later James II, and Admiral-General William III of Orange, his son-in-law and another future King of England. Neither of them took part in the fight.

Prince Rupert of the Rhine commanded the Allied fleet of more than 100 warships and 28 fireships, taking control of the centre himself, with Jean II d'Estrées commanding the van, and Sir Edward Spragge the rear division. The Dutch fleet of 75 warships and 22 fireships was commanded by Lieutenant-Admiral-General Michiel de Ruyter, with Lieutenant-Admirals Adriaen Banckert in charge of the van and Cornelis Tromp the rear. Although the Dutch ships were smaller on average than their opponents, their crews were better trained and more experienced.

== Battle ==
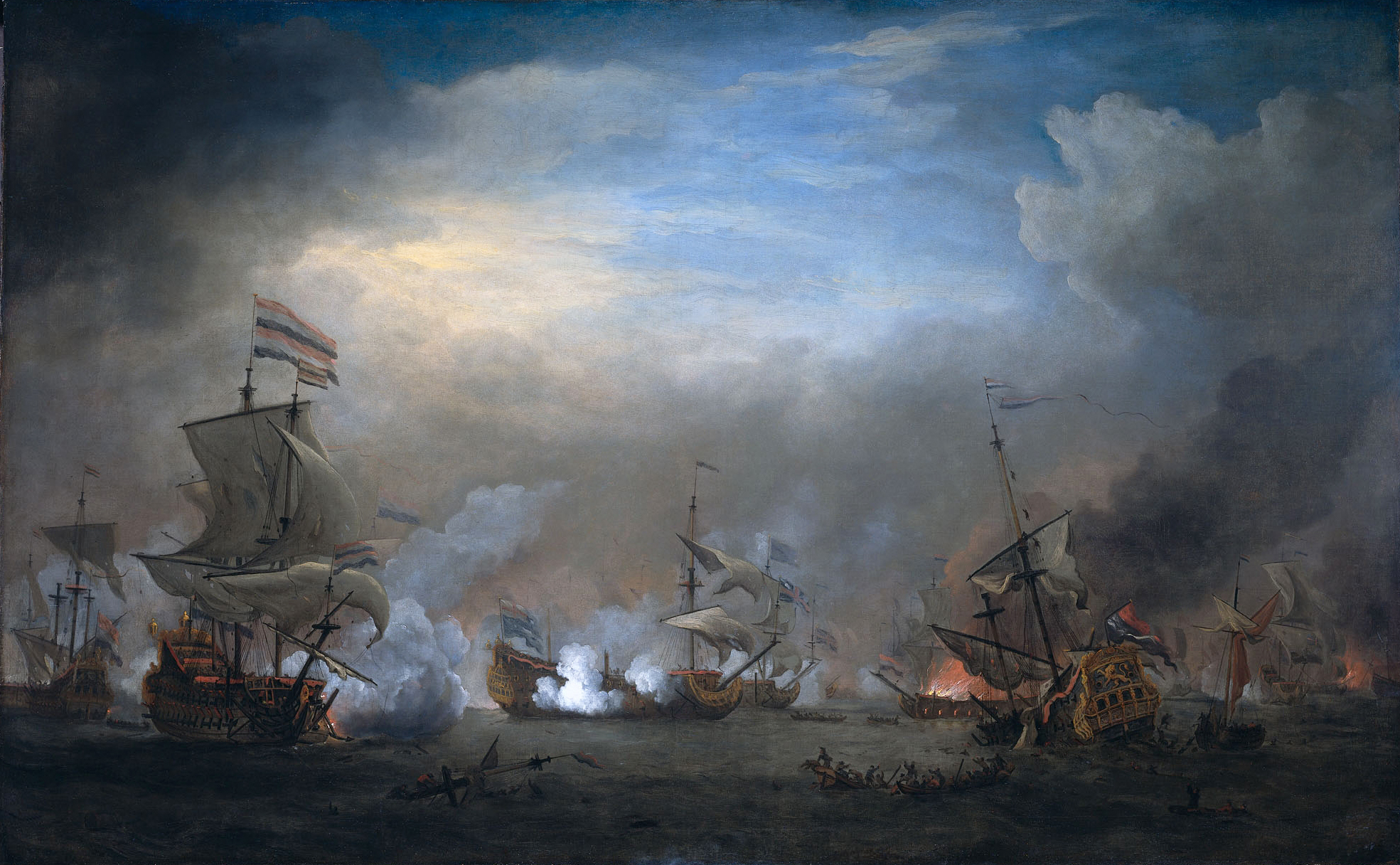
The Battle of Texel (1707) by Willem van de Velde the Younger

In late July, Rupert put to sea again, hoping to draw the Dutch fleet north by feinting against The Hague or Den Helder. De Ruyter initially remained at Schooneveld, but William ordered him to escort an inbound Dutch East India Company treasure fleet, whose capture could provide Charles enough funds to continue the war.

De Ruyter first decided not to leave his defensive position in the Schooneveld, from which he had successfully engaged the allied fleet in the double Battle of Schooneveld. However the Dutch Spice Fleet was returning from the Indies, filled with precious cargo. With half the country under French occupation for almost a year, the Dutch Republic's finances were in disastrous straits. The Dutch could not afford to lose the wealth the Spice Fleet was bringing, let alone allow it to be captured by the enemy. As such stadtholder William ordered De Ruyter to seek to engage the enemy.

Although outnumbered, De Ruyter gained the weather gauge and sent his van under Adriaen Banckert in to separate the Allied van (under D'Estrées) from the main fleet. His ploy was effective, and the French ships were unable to play a significant part in the remainder of the battle, which became a gruelling encounter between the bulk of the Dutch fleet and the English centre and rear divisions. Both suffered badly during hours of fierce fighting.

Once again, the rear divisions led by Spragge and Tromp clashed repeatedly, Spragge having publicly sworn to kill or capture his old enemy. Each had to shift their flags to fresh ships three times; on the third occasion, Spragge drowned when the boat transporting him sank. More importantly, his preoccupation with duelling Tromp isolated the English centre, and was a key factor in allowing an inferior but better managed fleet to succeed.

The fight between the English and Dutch centre under De Ruyter and Lieutenant-Admiral Aert Jansse van Nes continued for hours, with each side gaining the weather gauge as the winds shifted. Having disengaged from the French, Banckert joined the Dutch centre, followed first by Rupert, then De Ruyter; the main focus of the fight was a Dutch attempt to capture Spragge's isolated flagship, the Prince. This was unsuccessful, and with both fleets exhausted, the Allies withdrew; although no major ships sunk, many were seriously damaged and about 3,000 men died, two-thirds of them English or French.

== Aftermath ==
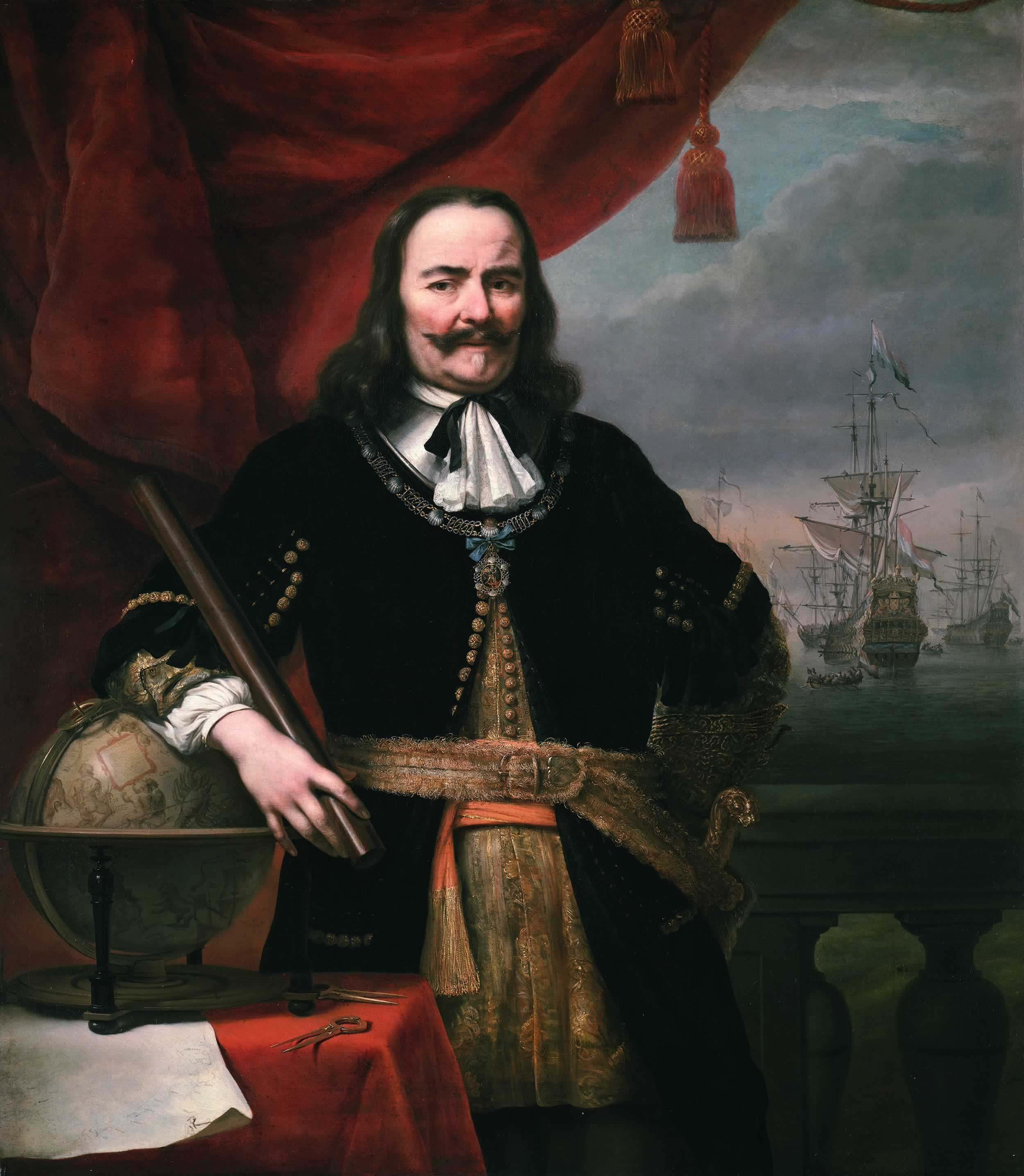
Lieutenant-Admiral Michiel de Ruyter, whose training compensated for Dutch numerical inferiority

After the battle, Prince Rupert complained the French had not done their share of the fighting, and their performance is still disputed. While Prud'homme states the French fought hard, he accepts they allowed themselves to become separated from the English fleet. The main dispute is whether this was deliberate; D'Estrées had been ordered by Louis XIV to preserve the French fleet, and thus disobeyed Rupert's orders to attack the Dutch, claiming the wind was too weak. By the admission of several French officers, their fleet was not prominent in the action, but they attributed this to inexperience.

The size of the Allied fleet and length of its battle line, combined with inadequacies in fighting instructions and signalling, made it hard to control. It deepened suspicions between the English and French, further undercutting popular support for the war, while ending any hopes of starving the Dutch through a naval blockade, making it an overwhelming strategic victory for the Dutch. This campaign was the highlight of De Ruyter's career, as acknowledged by the Duke of York, who concluded "he was the greatest that ever to that time was in the world".

Despite losing four ships, the Spice Fleet arrived safely, bringing the much needed financial reprieve. In the months following, the Netherlands formed a formal alliance with Spain and the Holy Roman Empire. The threat posed by German and Spanish invasions from the south and east forced the French to withdraw from the territory of the Republic. The Third Anglo-Dutch War came to an end with the signing of the Treaty of Westminster between the English and the Dutch in 1674. Fourteen years later the Glorious Revolution, which saw Stadtholder William III ascend the throne of England, put an end to the Anglo-Dutch conflicts of the 17th century. Not until 1781 would the Dutch and British fleets fight each other again in the battle of Dogger Bank.

== Gallery ==
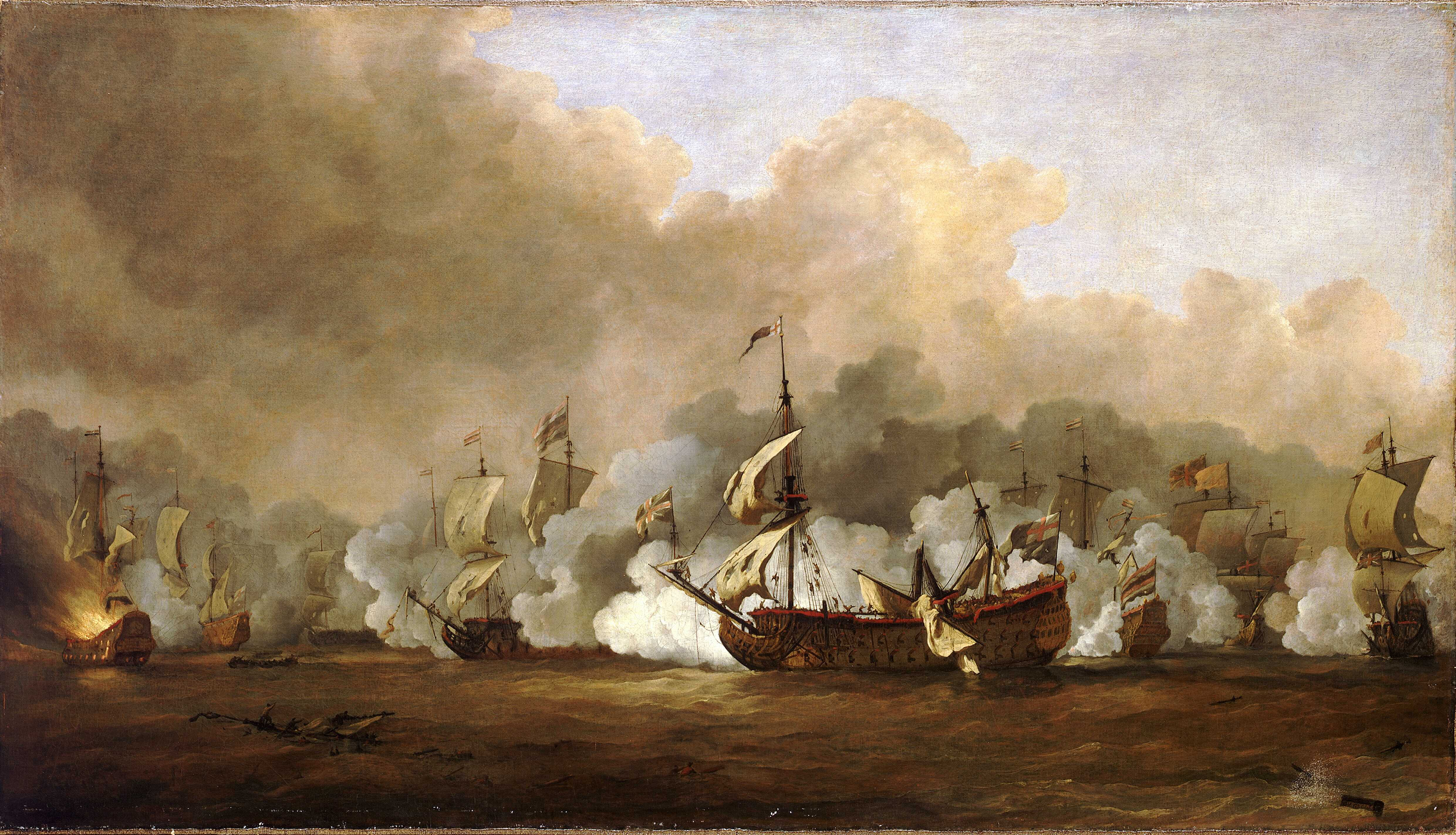

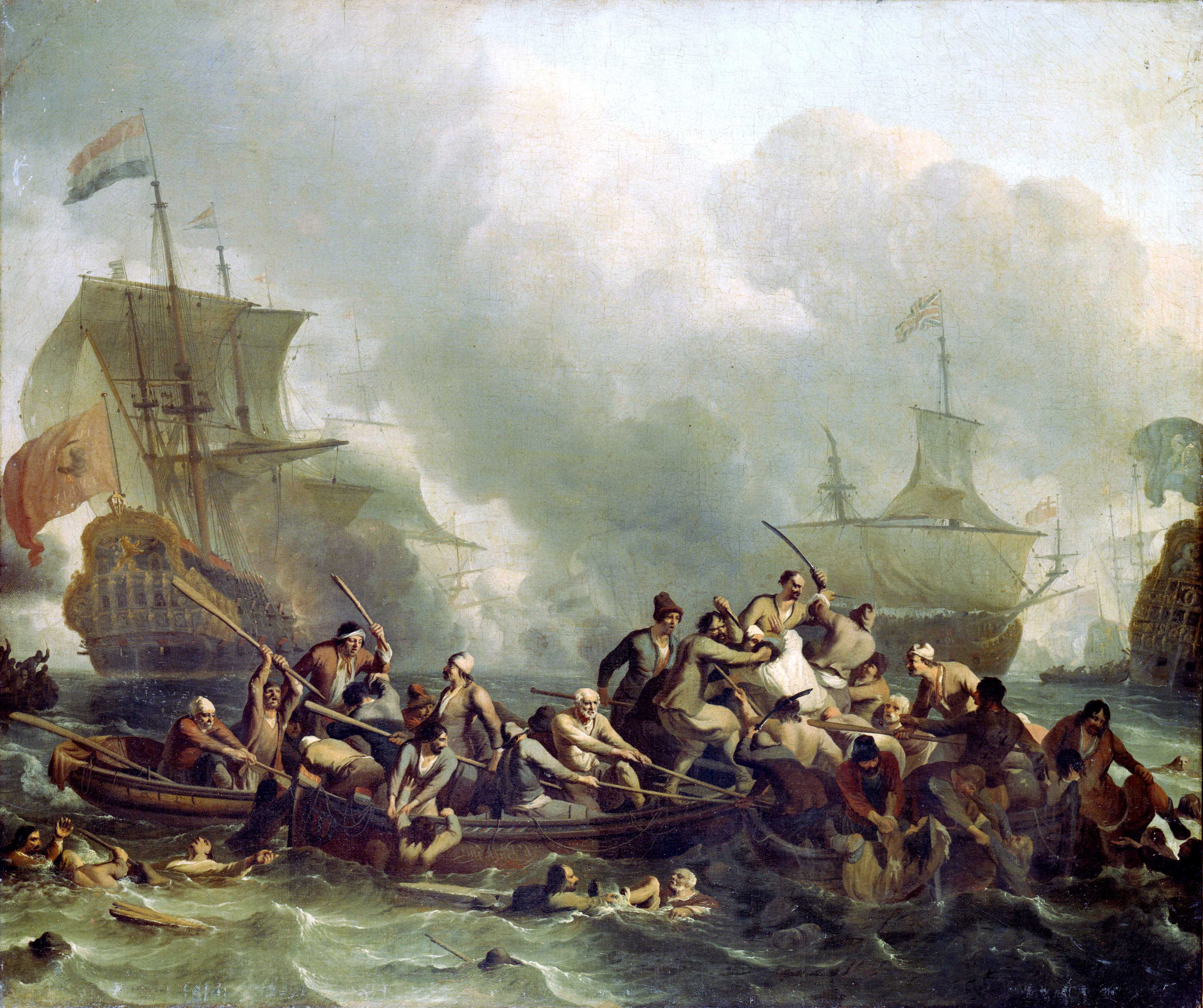

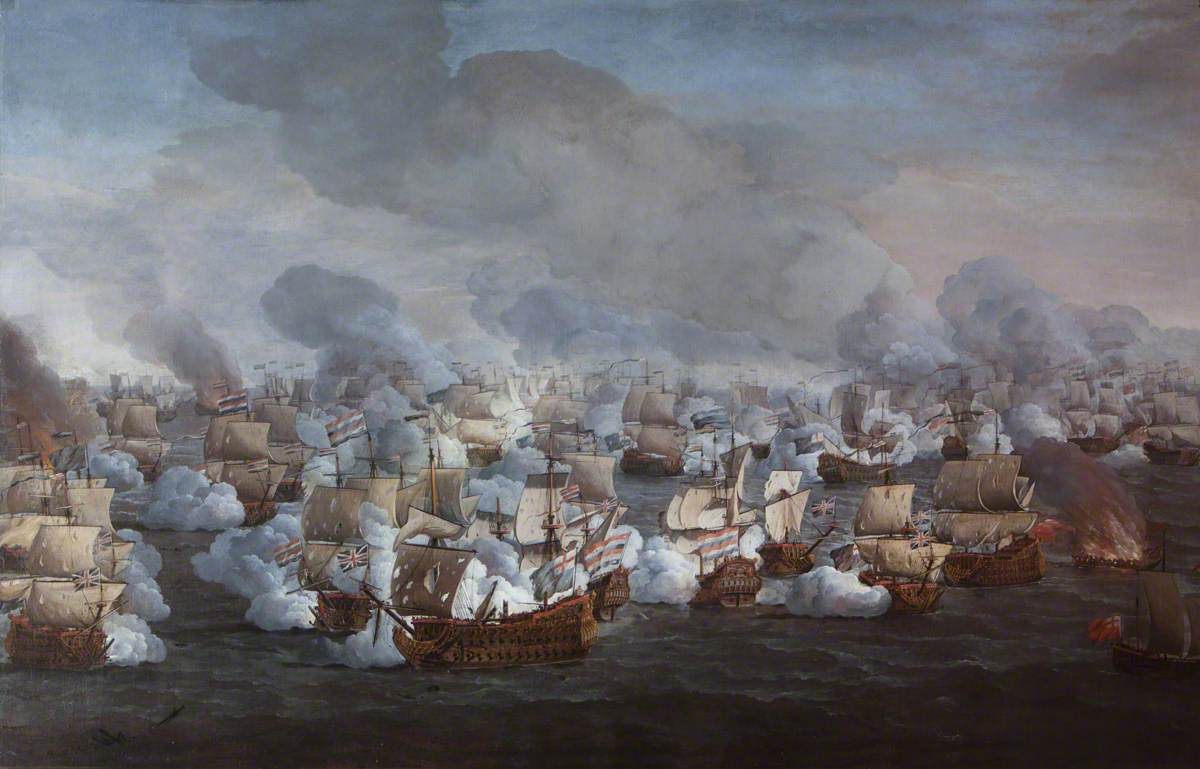

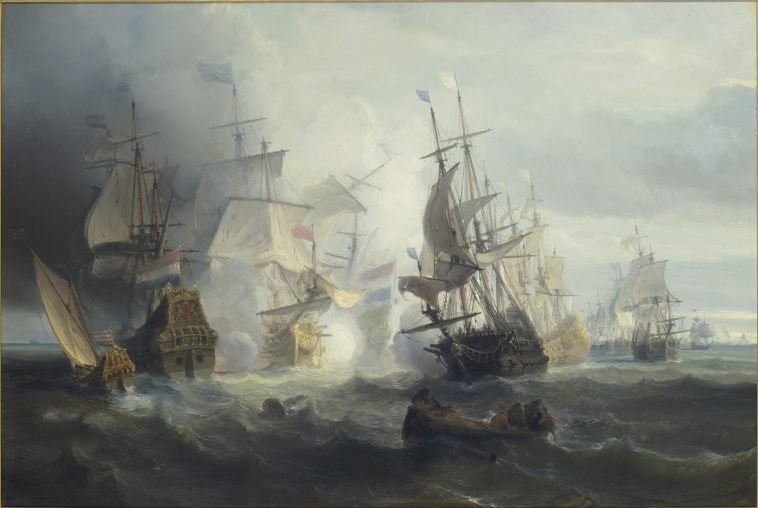

== Ships involved ==
=== England and France ===
Listed with number of guns and (where known) name of commander

White Squadron (French): 30 ships of the line, with about 1828 guns,
comprising the 27 ships from the previous Battle of Schooneveld, plus 3 new ones - the Royale Thérèse (80) - RA Marquis de Martel, Pompeux (70) and Diamant (60).

- Reine (104) - flagship of Lieutenant-général (= Vice-Adm.) Jean, comte d'Estrées
- Royale Thérèse (80) - flagship of Chef d'escadre (= Rear Adm.) Marquis de Martel
- Foudroyant (70)
- Grand (70)
- Illustre (70)
- Invincible (70)
- Orgueilleux (70)
- Pompeux (70)
- Terrible (70) - flagship of Chef d'escadre (= Rear Adm.) Hector des Ardens
- Glorieux (64)
- Sans Pareil (64)
- Tonnant (64)
- Excellent (60)
- Fortuné (60)
- Fier (58)
- Aimable (56)
- Conquérant (56)
- Diamant (54)
- Bon (52)
- Bourbon (52)
- Téméraire (52)
- Vaillant (52)
- Apollon (50)
- Aquilon (50)
- Duc (50)
- Maure (50)
- Oriflamme (50)
- Precieux (50)
- Prince (50)
- Sage (50)

Red squadron (English): 29 ships of the line (I-IV rates), with about 1870 guns + 2-V

- Van Division (Vice-Admiral's)
  - Constant Warwick (42) - Capt. Joseph Harris
  - Anne (60) - Capt. Thomas Elliott
  - French Ruby (80) -Capt. Thomas Roomcoyle
  - Lion (60) - Capt. John Ashby
  - London (100) - Capt. William Houlding ^{(a)}
  - Warspite (68) - Capt. Robert Stout
  - Happy Return (48) - Capt. John Stainsby
  - Triumph (70) - Capt. William Davies
  - Stavoreen^{(b)} (50) - Capt. Charles Royden
  - plus 4 fireships:
    - Leopard (6), expended - Matthias Bird
    - Robert (4) - Richard Collins
    - George' (6) - John Marshall
    - Amity (6) - William Pooley
- Centre Division (Admiral's)
  - Royal Katherine (100) - Capt. George Legge
  - Mary (60) - Capt. Sir Roger Strickland
  - Henry (80) - Capt. Sir John Ernle
  - Crown (50) - Capt. Richard Carter
  - Rupert (64) - Capt. Sir John Holmes
  - Royal Sovereign (100) - Capt. Sir William Reeves ^{(c)}
  - Resolution (70) - Capt. Sir John Berry
  - Princess (54) - Capt. Thomas Mayo
  - Edgar (74) - Capt. Richard Le Neve
  - Old James (70) - Capt. Richard Storey
  - Pearl ^{(d)} (28) - Capt. Thomas Booth
  - plus 8 fireships: ^{(e)}
    - Ann & Christopher (8) - Richard Haddock
    - Friendship (6) - John Kelsey
    - Katherine (6) - John Votier
    - Supply (6) - Henry Williams
    - Hopewell (6) - Henry Fitton
    - St Lawrence (6) - John Cooke
    - Hawke (2) - John Lucas
    - Thomas & Edward (6) - Matthew Dawson
- Rear Division (Rear-Admiral's)
  - Mary Rose (48) - Capt. Thomas Hamilton
  - Victory (80) - Capt. Sir William Jennens
  - Assurance (42) - Capt. Ralph Lascelles
  - Fairfax (72) - Capt. Dominic Nugent
  - Charles (100) - Capt. Richard Dickinson ^{(f)}
  - Monmouth (70) - Capt. Robert Robinson
  - Newcastle (52) - Capt. John Pierce
  - Nonsuch (40) - Capt. Lawrence Wright
  - Yarmouth (52) - Capt. John Keene
  - plus 4 fireships:
    - Truelove (2), expended - Peter Bonamy
    - Dartmouth (4) - John Burdick
    - Wivenhoe (6) - William Jacques
    - Olive Branch (6) - William Lee

Blue squadron (English): 27 ships of the line (I-IV rates), with about 1690 guns + 2-V

- Van Division (Rear-Admiral's)
  - Hampshire (46) - Capt. Richard Griffith
  - York (62) - Capt. Henry Clarke
  - Sweepstakes (40) - Capt. Peter Belbin
  - Swiftsure (66) - Capt. Richard Rooth
  - St. Michael (98) - Capt. John Narbrough ^{(g)}
  - Greenwich (60) - Capt. Thomas Bridgman
  - Foresight (52) - Capt. Richard James
  - Rainbow (56) - Capt. Mark Harrison
  - Portsmouth (48) - Capt. James Page
  - plus 2 fireships:
    - Firebush (4) - John Maine
    - Hope Prize (2) - John Martin
- Centre Division (Admiral's)
  - Dreadnought (66) - Capt. Richard Trevanion
  - St. George (68) - Capt. Thomas Darcy
  - Bristol (48) - Capt. Eric Sieubladh
  - Henrietta (60 - Capt. Count (Gustavus) Horne
  - Royal Charles (102) - Capt. John Hayward
  - Prince (100) - Capt. Thomas Fowler ^{(h)}
  - Swallow (46) - Capt. Edward Russell
  - Cambridge (70) - Capt. Arthur Herbert
  - Advice (46) - Capt. John Dawson
  - Dunkirk (60) - Capt. Francis Courtenay
  - plus 5 fireships: ^{(i)}
    - Society (6) - Robert Washbourne
    - Prudent Mary (6) - Christopher Billop
    - Benjamin (6) - John Pollea
    - Blessing (4) - William Andrews
    - Pearl (6) - William Booth
- Rear Division (Vice-Admiral's)
  - Diamond (48) - Capt. John Shelley
  - Unicorn (64) - Capt. John Rogers
  - St. Andrew (100) - Capt. John Archer ^{(j)}
  - Plymouth (58) - Capt. Anthony Young
  - Falcon (42) - Capt. Thomas Andrews
  - Gloucester (60) - Capt. William Coleman
  - Bonaventure (52) - Capt. Henry Killigrew
  - plus 2 fireships:
    - Hester (6) Richard Painter
    - Jason (4) - Francis Turner

Notes: (a) flagship of Vice-Admiral Sir John Harman. (b) former Dutch warship, captured on 28 May at the Battle of Solebay.
(c) flagship of Admiral Prince Rupert. (b) a fifth rate frigate, and thus not counted as a ship of the line.
(e) the five expended were the Friendship, Katherine, Supply, Hopewell and St Lawrence.
(f) flagship of Rear-Admiral Sir John Chicheley. (g) flagship of Rear-Admiral the Earl of Ossory.
(h) flagship of Admiral Sir Edward Spragge. (i) the four expended were the Society, Prudent Mary, Blessing and Pearl.
(j) flagship of Vice-Admiral Sir John Kempthorne.

Other British light craft present (not in any squadron)

2 fifth rates, one sixth rate and 4 unrated vessels

- Nightingale (34) - Capt. Edward Pierce
- Guernsey (30) - Capt. Leonard Harris
- Roebuck (18) - Capt. Charles Lloyd
- Henrietta (8) yacht - Capt. Thomas Guy
- Roe (6) dogger - Joseph Simmons
- Rose (6) dogger - Ralph Wrenn
- Fox (unarmed) shallop - Morgan Phillips
- John's Advice (unarmed) hospital ship - Capt. Robert Elfrith

13 sloops

- Bonetta (4) John Macklin
- Woolwich (4) Alexander Smart
- Chatham (4) William Watson
- Chatham Double (4) Joseph Perriman
- Dolphin (4) William Orchard
- Vulture (4) Robert Porteen
- Hound (8) Robert Winn
- Emsworth (6) Richard Country
- Spy (4) Peter Cooper
- Lizard (4) John Nicholson
- Cutter (4) Walter Power
- Invention (4) William Dixie
- Prevention (4) Elias Clifford

=== The Netherlands ===
==== Admiralty of Amsterdam ====
Ships of the line
- Akerboom 62 (Jacob Teding van Berkhout)
- Stad Utrecht 66 (Jan Davidszoon Bondt)
- Prince te Paard 55 (Adam van Brederode)
- Wakende Kraan 44 (Pieter Claesz Dekker)
- Zeelandia 44 (Daniël Elsevier)
- Steenbergen 68 (Jan Paulusz van Gelder, killed in battle)
- Hollandia 80 (Rear Admiral Jan de Haen)
- Gideon 62 (Barend Hals)
- Provincie van Utrecht 60 (Jan Janszoon de Jongh)
- Leeuwen 50 (Jan Gijsels van Lier)
- Spiegel 70 (Commodore Jacob van Meeuwen)
- Komeetstar 68 (Pieter Middelandt)
- Essen 50 (Philips de Munnik)
- Wapen van Holland 44 (Matthijs Dirkszoon Pijl)
- Waesdorp 68 (Engel de Ruyter)
- Tijdverdrijf 56 (Gilles Schey)
- Agatha 50 (Pieter Cornelisz de Sitter)
- Kalantsoog 68 (Volkert Hendrickszoon Swart, died from wounds)
- Beschermer 50 (David Swerius (Sweers), killed in battle)
- Oliphant 82 (Vice-Admiral Isaac Sweers, killed in battle)
- Geloof 56 (Cornelis Tijloos)
- Gouden Leeuw 82 (Lt-Admiral Cornelis Tromp, captain Thomas Tobiaszoon)
- Zuiderhuis 45 (Isaak Uitterwijk)
- Amsterdam 60 (Cornelis van der Zaan)

Frigates

- Oudkarspel 34 (Jan van Abkoude)
- Bommel 24 (Jan Bogaart)
- Edam 36 (Willem van Ewijk)
- Haas 24 (Hans Hartwich)
- Damiaten 32 (Mattheus Megank)
- Popkensburg 24 (Jan Noirot)
- Middelburg 36 (Hendrik Span)
- Brak 22 (Roemer Vlacq)

Advice yachts

- Egmond 10 (Jan Kramer)
- Triton 10 (Nicolaas Portugaal)
- Kits 4 (Gilles Saloy)
- Kater 10 (Abraham Taalman)

Fireships

- Zaaier 4 (Wijbrand Barendszoon)
- Jacob en Anna (Jan Boomgaard)
- Leidster 4 (Pieter van Grootveld)
- Vrede 4 (Dirk Klaaszoon Harney)
- Wapen van Velsen 4 (Jan van Kampen)
- Zalm 4 (Cornelis Jelmertszoon Kok)
- Kasteel van Loon 4 (Pieter Hendrikszoon Pop)
- Melkschuit 4 (Jacob Schenk)
- Salvador 4 (Jacob Vroom)
- Draak 4 (Willem Willemszoon)

==== Admiralty of de Maze ====
Ships of the line
- De Zeven Provinciën 80 (fleet flag, Lt-Admiral-General Michiel de Ruyter, flag captains Gerard Callenburgh and Pieter de Liefde)
- Delft 62 (Philips van Almonde)
- Ridderschap 64 (Eland du Bois)
- Voorzichtigheid 84 (Jan van Brakel)
- Gelderland 63 (temporary Rear-Admiral Cornelis de Liefde, mortally wounded)
- Vrijheid 80 (Vice-Admiral Jan Evertszoon de Liefde, killed in battle)
- Eendracht 72 (Lt-Admiral Aert Jansse van Nes)
- Maagd van Dordrecht 68 (Vice-Admiral Jan Jansse van Nes)
- Dordrecht 44 (Frans van Nijdek)
- Zeelandia 42 (Simon van Panhuis)
- Schieland 58 (Adriaan Poort)
- Wassenaer 59 (Barend Rees)

Frigates

- Schiedam 20 (Cornelis van der Hoevensoon)
- Utrecht 34 (Jan Snellensoon)
- Rotterdam 30 (Jacob Pieterszoon Swart)
- Harderwijk 24 (Mozes Wichmansoon))

Advice yachts

- Hoop 6 (Isaac Anteuniszoon van Anten)
- Rotterdam 6 (Wijnand van Meurs)

Fireships

- Sint Pieter (Gerrit Halfkaag)
- Jisper Kerk 4 (Lens Harmenszoon)
- Blackmoor 4 (Abraham van Koperen)
- Maria 4 (Dirk de Munnik)
- Eenhoorn (Willem de Rave)
- Louise 4 (Jan Daniëlszoon van Rijn)

==== Admiralty of the Northern Quarter ====
Ships of the line
- Pacificatie 76 (Cornelis Bakker)
- Jupiter 42 (Pieter Bakker)
- Gelderland 45 (Maarten de Boer)
- Eenhoorn 70 (Rear-Admiral Jan Janszoon Dick)
- Westfriesland 78 (Jan Heck)
- Wapen van Nassau 58 (Pieter Karseboom)
- Wapen van Alkmaar 63 (Jan Krook)
- Wapen van Enkhuizen 72 (Leendert Kuiper)
- Justina van Nassau 66 (Jan Gerritszoon van Muis)
- Noorderkwartier 60 (Jacob Roos)
- Prins van Oranje 64 (Claes Corneliszoon Valehaen)
- Wapen van Medemblik 44 (Hendrik Visscher, killed in battle)
- Caleb 50 (Claes Pietersz Wijnbergen)

Fireships

- Vis (Harmen de Boer)
- Catharina 2 (Pieter Sievertszoon Bouckertsen)
- Witte Mol 4 (Hendrik Munt)

==== Admiralty of Zeeland ====
Ships of the line
- Walcheren 70 (Lt-admiral Adriaen van Trappen Banckert)
- Zierikzee 60 (Vice-admiral Cornelis Evertsen de Jonge)
- Dordrecht 50 (Willem Hendrickszoon)
- Ter Veere 50 (Dirk Jobszoon Kiela, killed in battle)
- Utrecht 50 (Simon Loncke)
- Domburg 60 (Carel van der Putte)
- Vlissingen 48 (Salomon Le Sage)

Frigates

- Delft 34 (Adriaen van Trappen Banckert de Jonge)
- Ter Goes 34 (Anteunis Matthijszoon)

Advice yachts

- Hazewind 7 (Tobias Adriaanszoon)
- Goes 8 (David van Geerstdale)
- Waterhond 4 (Jacob Hamers)
- Zwaluw 6 (Matthijs Lauwerens)
- Jonge Maria 10 (Arnoud Leunissen)
- Tonijn 6 (Pieter de Moor)
- ? (Hendrik Pieterszoon)
- Bruinvis 6 (Jan Corneliszoon Poot)
- Parel 6 (Teunis Post)
- Lapmande 8 (Schuyen)

Fireships

- Samuel en Jacob 4 (Simon Arendszoon)
- Dadelboom 2 (Reinier Dirkszoon)
- Catharina 4 (Frederik Konvent)
- Sevellie 2 (Anteunis Janszoon Schalje)
- Burg 2 (Huibrecht Wolfertszoon)

==== Admiralty of Friesland ====
Ships of the line
- Elf Steden 50 (Witzo Johannes Beima)
- Prins Hendrik Casimir 70 (Rear-Admiral Hendrik Bruynsvelt)
- Groningen 70 (Vice-Admiral Enno Doedes Star)
- Oostergo 58 (Jan Janszoon Vijselaer)

Frigate

- Windhond 30 (Jan Pieterszoon Vinckelbos)

Advice yachts

- Hoop 6 (Cornelis Reindertszoon Eenarm)
- Liefde (Jochem Jansen)

Fireship

- Welkomst (IJsbrand Albertszoon)

== Sources ==
- Davies, J. D. (2008). Pepys' Navy: Ships, Men and Warfare 1649-89. Pen and Sword. ISBN 9781783830220.
- Jenkins, E. H. (1973). A History of the French Navy. MacDonald and Jane's. ISBN 978-0786457847.
- Prud'homme van Reine, Ronald (2015). Rechterhand van Nederland: Biografie van Michiel Adriaenszoon de Ruyter. Atlas Contact. ISBN 978-9045023298.
- Rodger, N. A. M. (2004). The Command of the Ocean: A Naval History of Britain, 1649–1815. Penguin. ISBN 9780713994117.
- Bodart, Gaston (1908). Militär-historisches Kriegs-Lexikon (1618–1905).
- Blok, P.J. (1928). Michiel de Ruyter (PDF) (in Dutch). Martinus Nijhof.
