= Admiral Karpfanger (barque) =

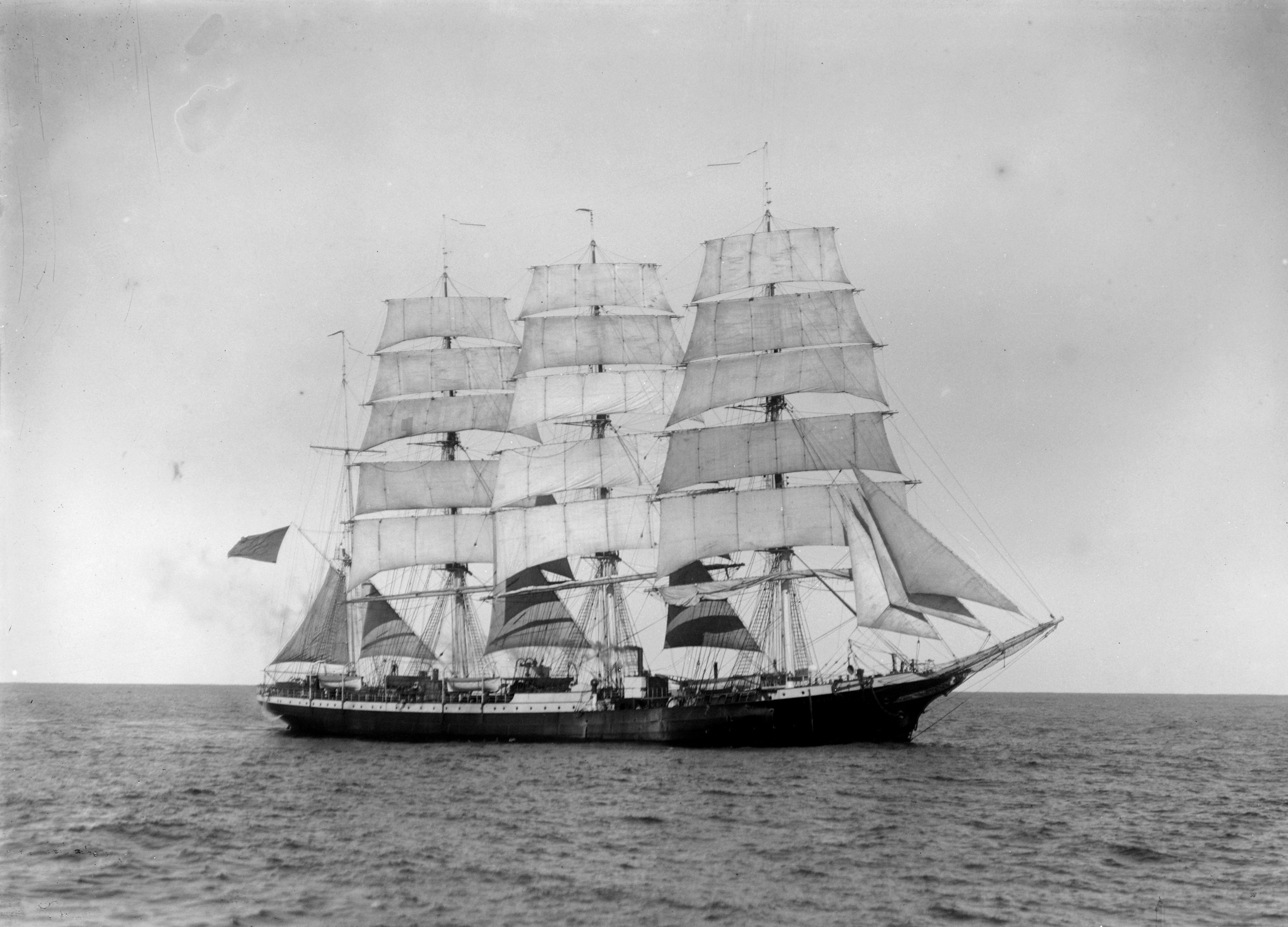
- l'Avenir under sail

History
- Name: l'Avenir (until 1937); Admiral Karpfänger (1937 onward)
- Namesake: French for "The Future" (until 1937); Berend Jacobsen Karpfanger (from 1937)
- Owner: Association Maritime Belge (until 1932); Gustaf Erikson (1932–37); Hamburg America Line (1937–38)
- Operator: Association Maritime Belge (until 1932); Gustaf Erikson (1932–37); Hamburg America Line (1937–38)
- Port of registry: (Belgium) Antwerp (until 1932); (Finland) Mariehamn (1932–37); (Nazi Germany) Hamburg (1937–38)
- Builder: RC Rickmers, Geestemünde
- Completed: 1908
- Identification: code letters MLBN (until 1932); call sign OHPZ (1935–37); call sign DJTX (1937–38)
- Fate: Lost without trace, March 1938

General characteristics
- Tonnage: 2,738 GRT
- Length: 285.6 ft (87.1 m)
- Beam: 45.2 ft (13.8 m)
- Depth: 25.2 ft (7.7 m)
- Sail plan: four-masted barque
- Crew: 60
- Sensors & processing systems: submarine signalling (until 1935)

Admiral Karpfanger was a German four-masted barque that was a cargo ship and sail training ship. She was built near Bremerhaven in 1908 as l'Avenir, which was the name that she bore until 1937. She spent most of her career with the Association Maritime Belge, SA.

In 1932 Gustaf Erikson bought l'Avenir and added her to his fleet of commercial sailing ships. In 1937 Erikson sold her to Hamburg America Line (HAPAG), who refitted her as a sail training ship and renamed her Admiral Karpfanger.

In 1938 she disappeared on her first voyage with HAPAG, with the loss of all 60 crewmen and cadets aboard.

== Building ==
RC Rickmers, AG of Geestemünde, near Bremerhaven, built l'Avenir in 1908. She had a steel hull, was 285.6 ft (87.1 m) long, had a beam of 45.2 ft (13.8 m) and depth of 25.2 ft (7.7 m). She had four masts and her tonnage was 2,738 GRT.

== l'Avenir ==
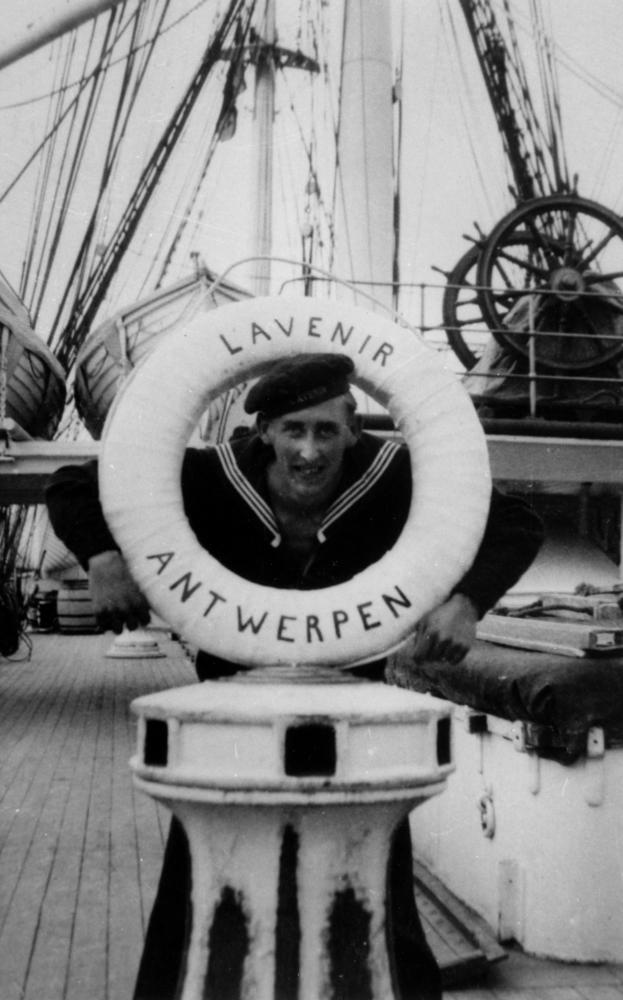
Aboard l'Avenir in Buenos Aires when she was a Belgian training ship, about 1930

L'Avenir had a long career as a Belgian sail training ship registered in Antwerp. In 1932 Association Maritime Belge sold her to Gustav Erikson, a Finn who re-registered her in Mariehamn. Erikson operated a notable fleet of sailing cargo ships, which in the 1930s dominated the annual Grain race to bring wheat from Australia to Europe.

In 1933–34 the composer Percy Grainger and his second wife, the artist Ella Ström, were passengers on l'Avenir from Europe to Port Germein, South Australia.

== Admiral Karpfanger ==
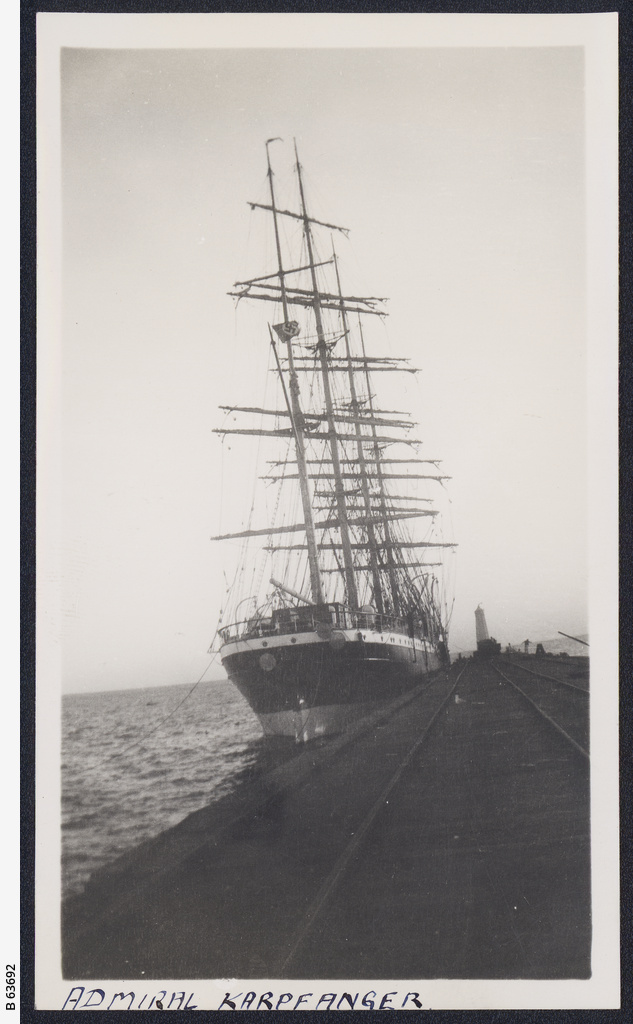
Admiral Karpfanger in Port Germein, South Australia in 1938 before her final voyage

In 1937 HAPAG bought l'Avenir from Erikson and had her overhauled and refitted as a training ship for its officer cadets. HAPAG renamed the ship Admiral Karpfanger after Berend Jacobsen Karpfanger (1623–83), a 17th-century admiral of the Hanseatic League, and re-registered her in Hamburg.

In September 1937 Admiral Karpfanger sailed from Hamburg with a complement of 27 men and 33 cadets. She docked in Port Germein on 6 January 1938 and spent the next month loading a cargo of 3,447 tons of wheat. Her Master reported that the generator that powered the ship's wireless was faulty.

On 8 February 1938 Admiral Karpfanger left Port Germein for the UK. On 1 March she reported to Awarua radio station on the southern tip of New Zealand that her position was 51°S 172°E, due south of the South Island. This showed that her Master had chosen to sail eastward to Europe via Cape Horn. She was then in contact with Norddeich radio station in Germany. The last wireless message Norddeich received from her was on 12 March.

== Search and investigation ==
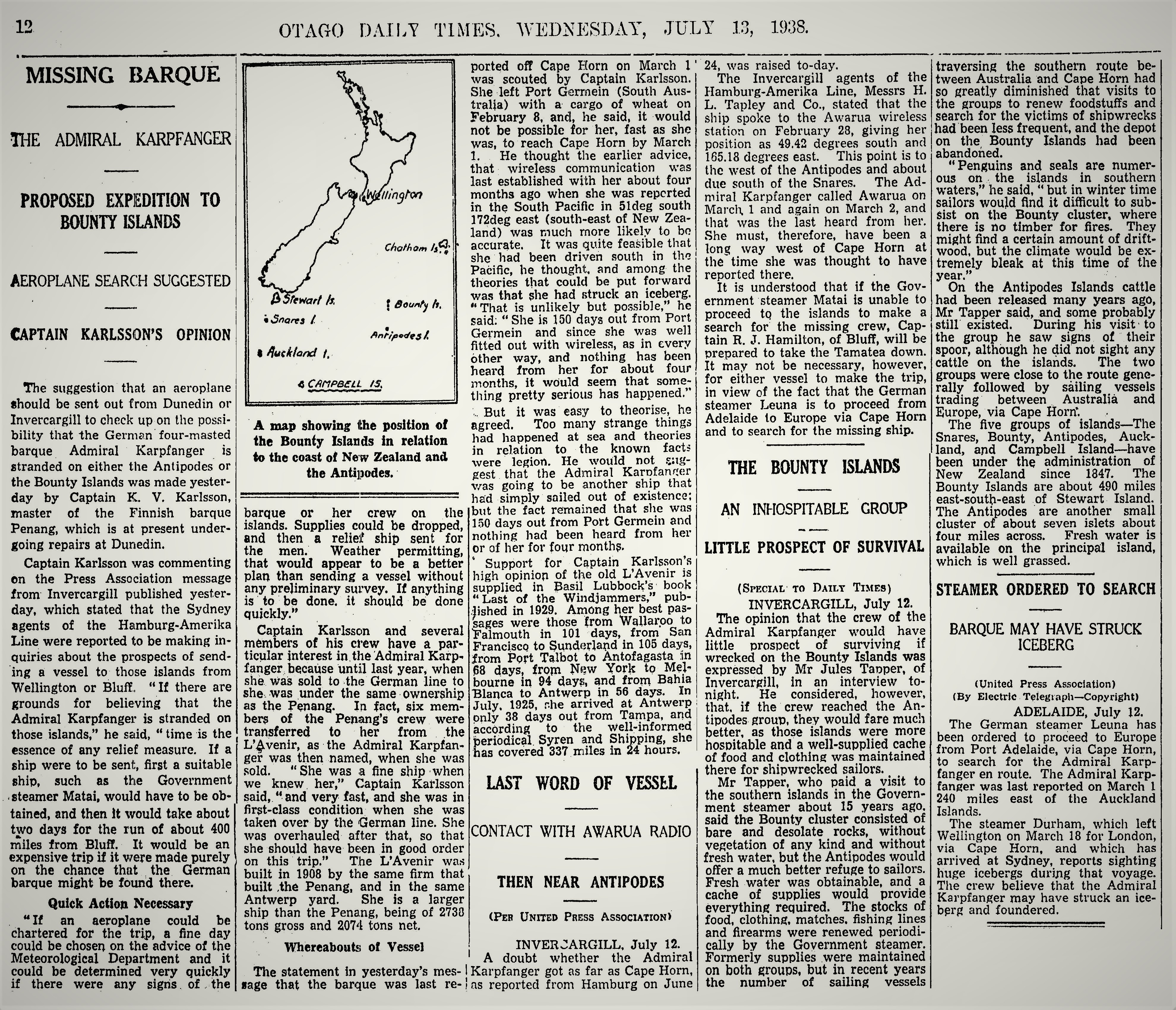
Detailed coverage from 1938 about the missing of the Admiral Karpfanger. With descriptions of possible rescue missions; speculation about what might have happened, and the crew's chances of survival. All articles from the Otago Daily Times (New Zealand) of July 13, 1938. Readable in full resolution.

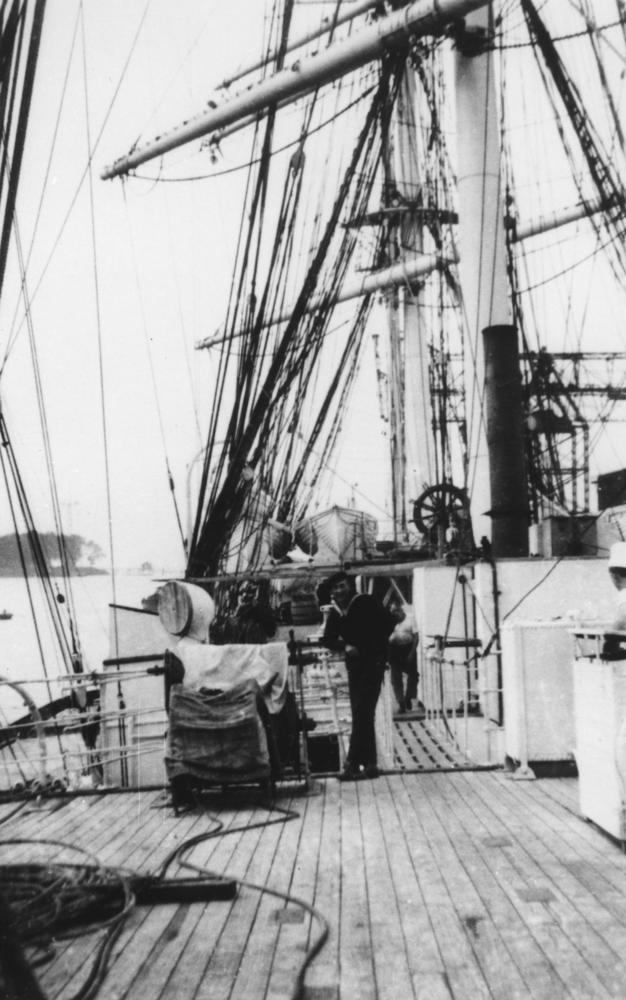
On deck on l'Avenir in Buenos Aires in 1930

HAPAG took some months to realise that the barque was missing. On June 24 the authorities of New Zealand were informed. It was feared that the ship might have been stranded on either the Bounty Islands or Antipodes Island, both sub-antarctic islands of New Zealand. Later, an Argentinian motor ship, the 637 GRT Bahia Blanca, searched for her but found nothing. A HAPAG motor ship also searched the route to search for her, but also found nothing.

A Chilean ship searched the Cape Horn region from 10 to 12 October. In Windhound Bay on the south coast of Navarino Island her crew found two pieces of a door, a piece of name plate and a piece of wooden wreckage with a rope from the Belgian Navy attached to it. These pieces of wreckage were believed to be from Admiral Karpfanger.

One ship in the area at the time that Admiral Karpfanger disappeared reported that it had sighted icebergs from Antarctica unusually far north for the time of year. Early in 1939 a maritime court in Hamburg noted different possible causes for her loss. She could have struck an iceberg. Alternatively a heavy sea could have damaged her rigging, her hatches or her hull. The court found the cause of her loss to be force majeure.

== Bibliography ==
- Riesenberg, Felix (1939). Cape Horn: the story of the Cape Horn region, including the straits of Magellan, from the days of the first discoverers, through the glorious age of sail, to the present time, etc. New York: Dodd, Mead & Co. pp. 348, 349.
- Wilson, RM (1956). The Big Ships. London: Cassell & Co. p. 230.
