= Berend Jacobsen Karpfanger =

German admiral

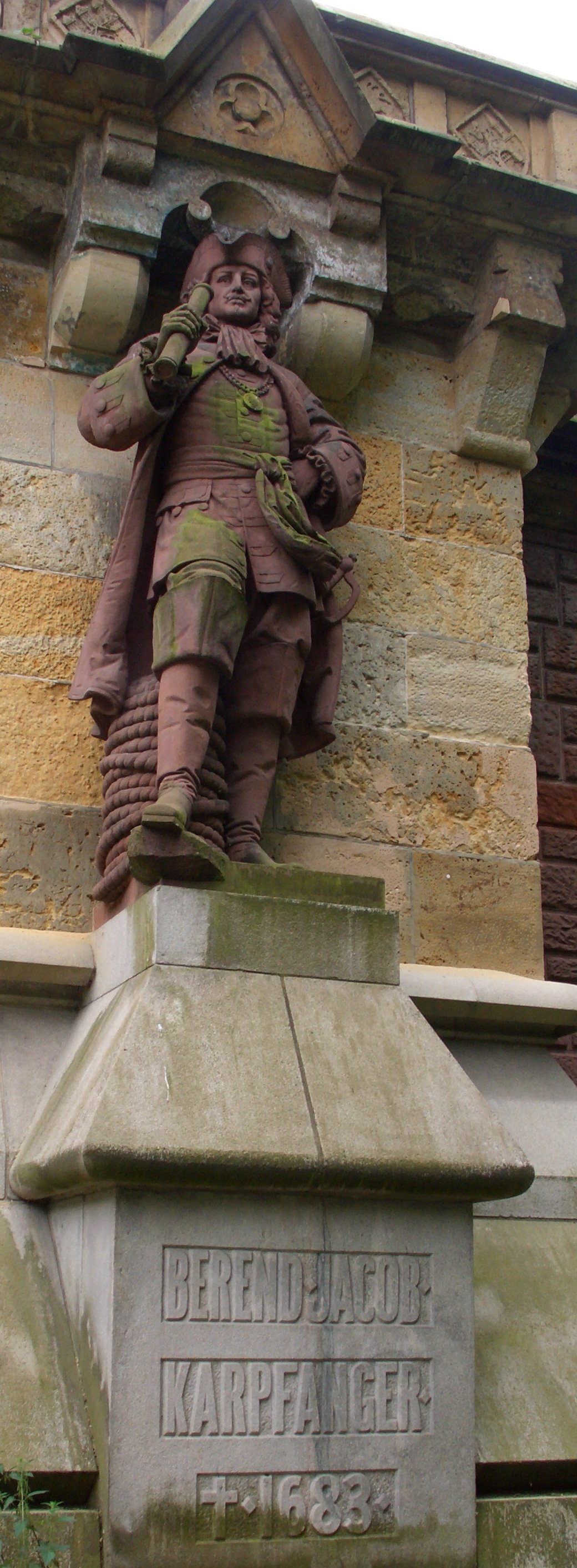
Statue of Karpfanger in Hamburg, 1897

Berend Jacobsen Karpfanger (1623 – 11 October 1683) was a German admiral of the Hamburg Admiralty known for fighting pirates. He was the captain of the convoy ships Leopold I and Wapen von Hamburg, which defended merchant ships from the pirates of the North African Barbary Coast.

== Career ==
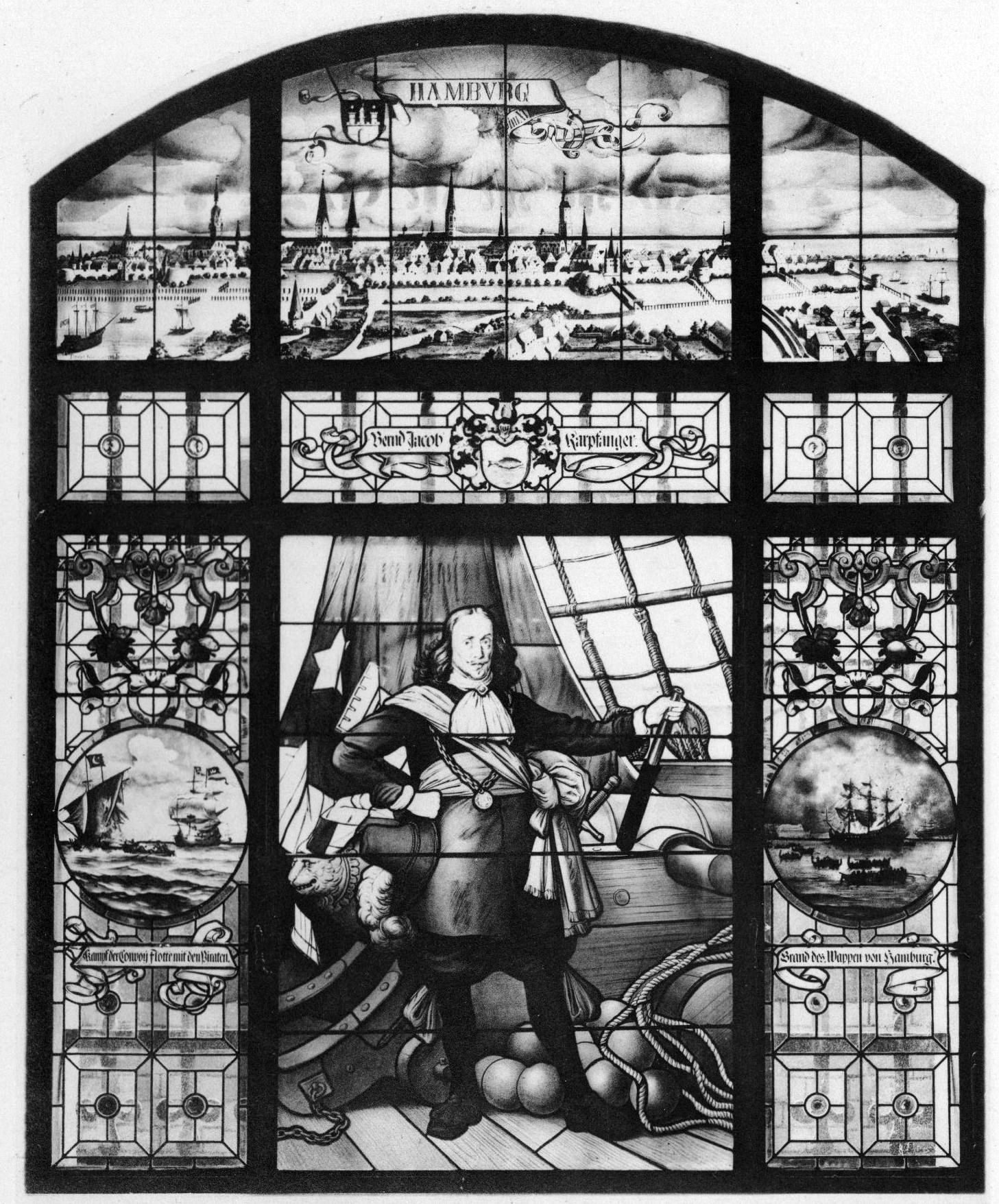
Stained glass window, destroyed in World War II, from the Hamburg town hall featuring Karpfanger

Karpfanger was born in Hamburg in 1623 into a seafaring family with Dutch roots. He inherited a fleet of ships from his father, captaining these and scoring significant successes in fighting piracy. His fleet of ships expanded as he commandeered the ships he captured.

In 1674, he rose to the rank of admiral, becoming a Convoykapitän. This title was given to those captains of warships who escorted merchant ships along the traderoutes of the Hanseatic League. Karpfanger first took command of the ship Leopoldus Primus, later called Leopold I, and later on Wapen von Hamburg, which launched in 1669. Commissioned in 1668 to protect the merchant ships from the Barbary corsairs, the Wapen was a 40 metres (130 ft) long warship with a total of 54 cannons, ranging from four to 18 pounds. Karpfanger took command of this ship in 1683, when Leopold I was being repaired.

Karfanger was with the ship on 10 October 1683. On that day, while the ship was in the port of Cádiz, a fire started in the bow of the frigate that spread quickly throughout the rest of the ship. The crew tried desperately to fight the fire and when they could not contain it attempted to abandon ship on sloops. Karpfanger himself refused to abandon the ship while efforts continued to save it and commanded the crew to return to further fight the fire. Around midnight, the fire reached the ship's gunpowder magazine, causing the ship to explode. Admiral Karfanger was among the dead, alongside 22 soldiers and 42 crewmen. His body was found floating on the mooring line of an English ship in the harbour the next morning. The cause of the fire was never discovered.

== Legacy ==
Karpfanger was buried with honor at the cemetery in Cádiz, with a monument ordered at his tomb in his honor by Charles II of Spain. In 1808 the French moved the cemetery to make room to expand the fortress.

In 1897 Hamburg honoured Karpfanger with a monument designed by R Okelmann. In 1937 the Hamburg America Line bought the barque l'Avenir and renamed it Admiral Karpfanger in his honour.
