= Baylie =

Baylie is a surname. Notable people with the surname include:

- Richard Baylie (1585–1667), English academic
- Thomas Baylie (1582–1663), English clergyman

== See also ==
- Bailey (disambiguation)
