= Dedinovo =

Village in Moscow Oblast, Russia

Coordinates: 55°3′N 39°7′E

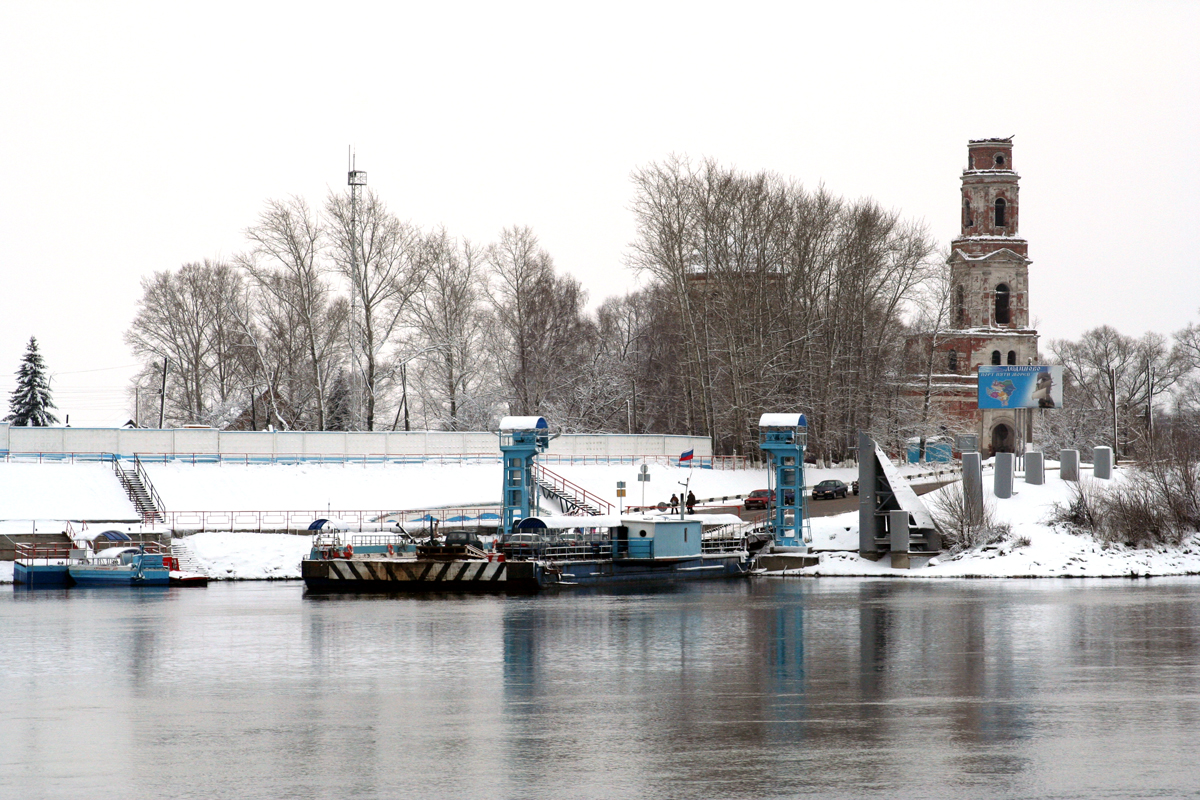
Dedinovskiy parom, Dedinovo, Lukhovitskiy district

Dedinovo (Russian: Деди́ново) is a village in Lukhovitsky District of Moscow Oblast, Russia, located on both sides of the Oka River 12 km (6.5 mi) north of Lukhovitsy and 110 km (65 mi) south-east of Moscow. In 1990 the population was estimated at 7,000.

The population is predominantly employed in agriculture. Carrots and potatoes are the main crops grown in the village's fields.

Dedinovo has a convenience store, a movie theater, a post office, and a bookstore. A ferry/bus-station of the Lukhovitsy–Lisyi Nory road is located here.

== History ==
The village was established by citizens of Novgorod in the late 15th century. It was known as one of the biggest centers of riverine shipbuilding in the 17th-century Russia. The first Russian military ship, Oryol, was built here in 1669.
