= French ship Royal Duc (1668) =

French naval ship

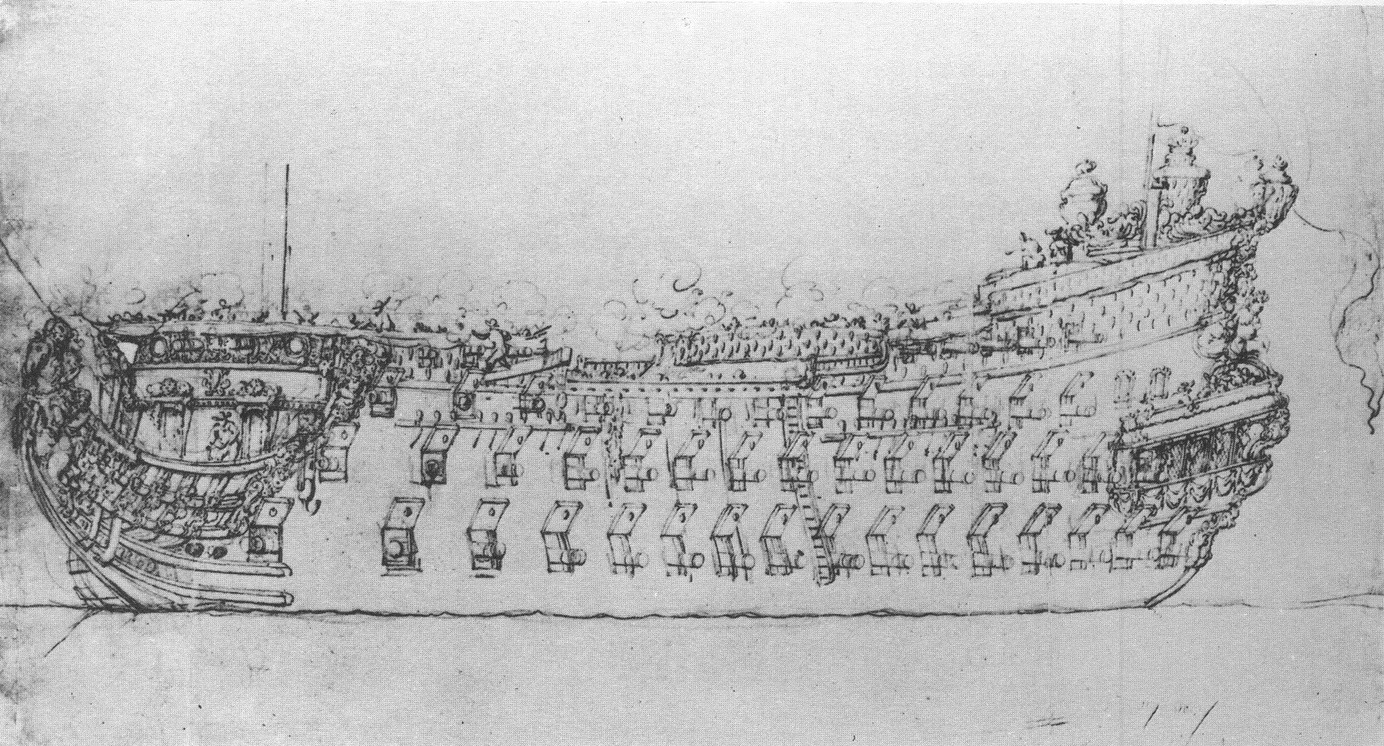
- Portrait of Reine by Willem van de Velde the Younger

History

France
- Name: Royal Duc
- Builder: Laurent Hubac, in Brest Dockyard
- Laid down: October 1667
- Launched: December 1668
- Completed: March 1669
- Out of service: November 1699
- Renamed: Reine on 24 June 1671
- Fate: Taken to pieces in May 1688

General characteristics
- Class & type: ship of the line
- Tonnage: 1,900 tons
- Length: 155 French feet (Note: The (pre-metric) French foot was 6.575% longer than the equivalent English foot.)
- Beam: 42 French feet
- Draught: 22 French feet 10 inches
- Depth of hold: 19½ French feet
- Decks: 3 gun decks
- Complement: 750, +9 officers
- Armament: 104 guns: 16 × 36-pounder long guns + 14 × 24-pounder long guns on lower deck; 30 × 18-pounder long guns on middle deck; 26 × 8-pounder long guns on upper deck; 18 6-pounder long guns on quarterdeck and forecastle
- Armour: Timber

Royal Duc was a 104-gun ship of the line of the French Royal Navy. She was built at Brest Dockyard, designed and constructed by Laurent Hubac. Her name was altered to Reine on 24 June 1671. She took part in the two Battles of Schooneveldt on 7 and 13 June 1671 (N.S.) and the Battle of Texel on 21 August 1673, each time as flagship of Vice-Admiral Jean d'Estrées. She was condemned in April 1688, and broken up in the following month.
