= Thomas Baylie =

- Born: 1582; Wiltshire, England
- Died: 1663 (aged 80–81); Marlborough, Wiltshire, England
- Resting place: St Peter's Church, Marlborough
- Education: St Alban Hall, Oxford; Magdalen College, Oxford
- Occupation: Clergyman
- Title: Rector of Manningford Bruce; Rector of Mildenhall
- Movement: Puritanism, Fifth Monarchists

Thomas Baylie (1582–1663) was an English clergyman, member of the Westminster Assembly, Fifth Monarchist and ejected minister.

== Life ==
He was born in Wiltshire in 1582, and was entered either as a servitor or batler of St. Alban Hall, Oxford, in 1600. He was elected demy of Magdalen College in 1600, and perpetual fellow of the college in 1611, being then M.A.

Afterwards he became rector of Manningford Bruce, Wiltshire, and he proceeded to the degree of B.D. in 1621, at which time he was a zealous puritan. He took the covenant in 1641 and was nominated a member of the Westminster Assembly of divines. He was given the rich rectory of Mildenhall, Wiltshire. There he preached the tenets of the fifth-monarchy men, and was occupied in ejecting ministers and schoolmasters that were called ignorant and scandalous.

On being turned out of his living after the Restoration, he set up a conventicle at Marlborough, Wiltshire. There he died and was buried in the church of St. Peter on 27 March 1663.

== Works ==
He published a work dedicated to Sir Thomas Coventry, keeper of the great seal.
