= French ship Téméraire (1671) =

Ship of the line of the French Navy

History

France
- Name: Téméraire
- Laid down: 1669
- Launched: 25 May 1671
- Fate: Sunk, 9 December 1694

Téméraire was a ship of the line of the French Navy.

She was laid down in Brest in 1669 as Ardent, and renamed Téméraire soon after launching in 1671.

She took part in the campaign in Sicilia in 1676, in the Battle of Bévézier (10 July 1690) and the Battle of Barfleur (29 May 1692). She also took part in the Battle of Lagos.

She was sunk by the English frigate HMS Montagu on 9 December 1694.
