= Leopoldus Primus =

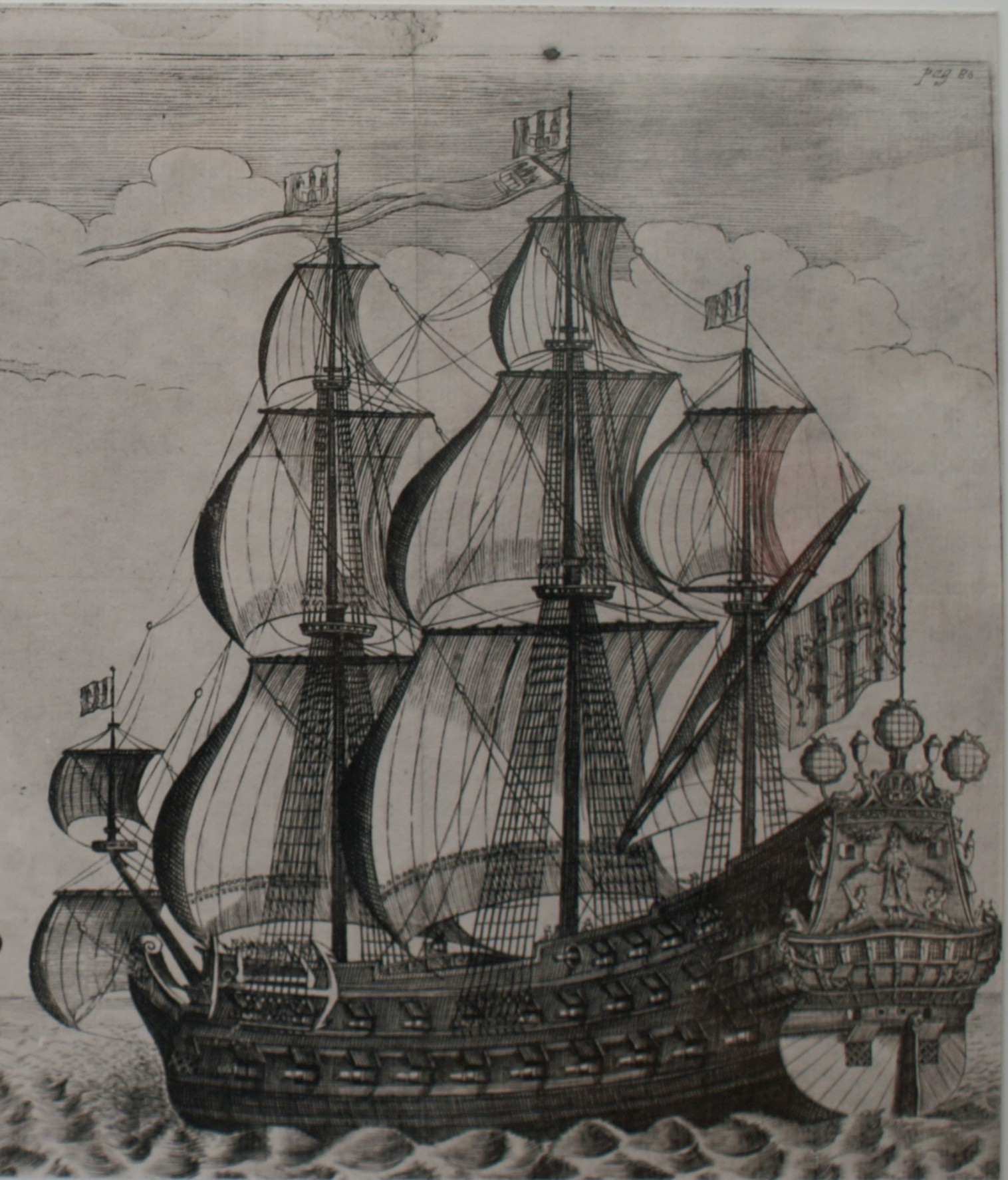

History

Hamburg
- Namesake: Leopold I
- Ordered: 1663
- Launched: 1668
- Decommissioned: 1705
- Fate: Scrapped 1705

General characteristics
- Length: 40 metres (130 ft)
- Armament: 54 cannon: 26 × 18 pdr (8.2 kg); 18 × 8 pdr (3.6 kg); 4 × 6 pdr (2.7 kg); 6 × 4 pdr (1.8 kg)

The Leopoldus Primus, also called Leopold I, was the first convoy ship commissioned to protect the Free and Hanseatic City of Hamburg. She was designed for use against piracy on the trade routes to Spain, Portugal, and West Africa and to accompany whalers to Greenland. Named in honor of Holy Roman Emperor Leopold I, she was put into service in 1668 and scrapped in 1705 after 34 major missions. She was probably identical with the Wapen von Hamburg, which went into service shortly after her.

== Background ==
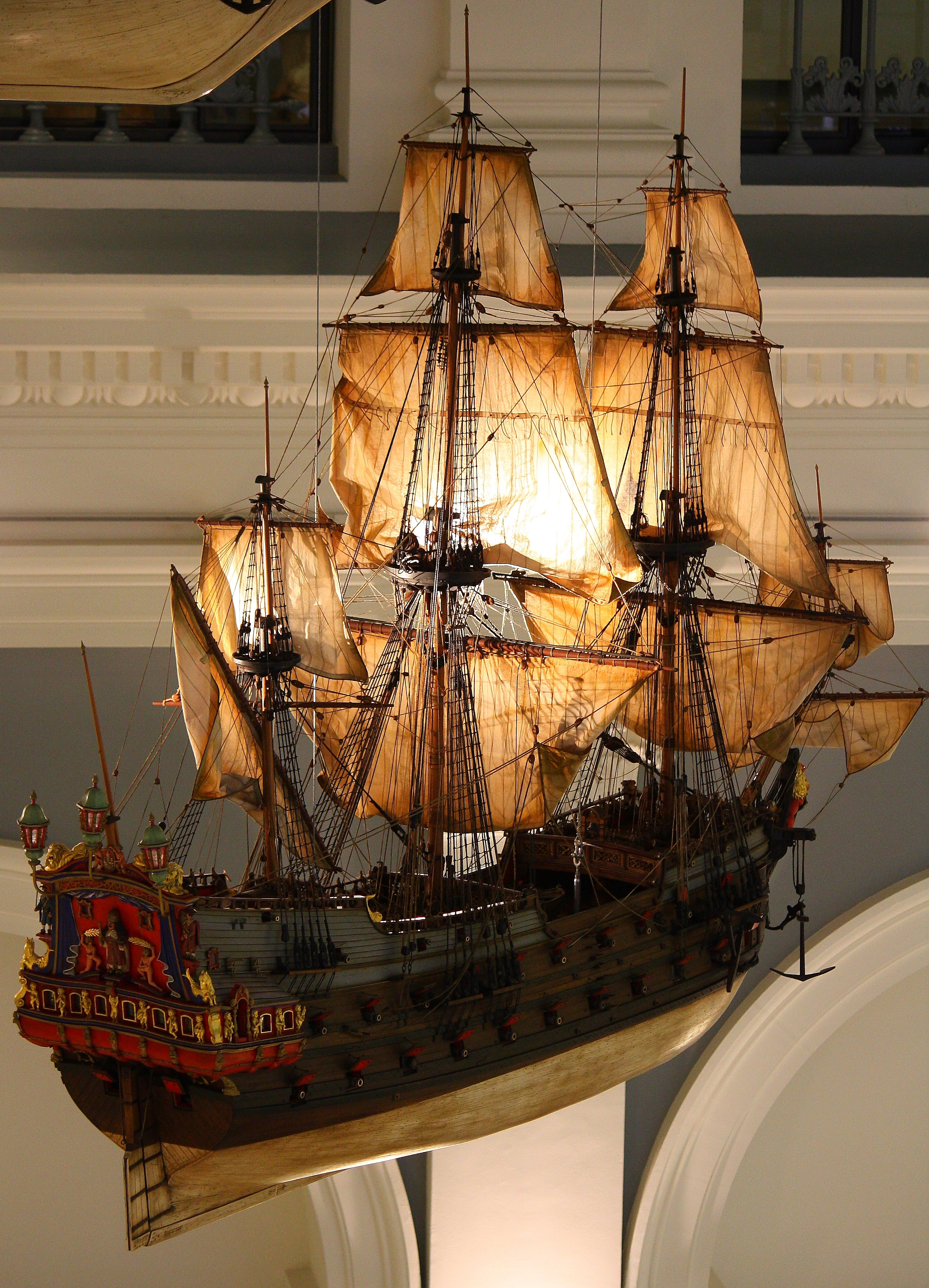
model at the Chamber of Commerce

In the 17th century, Hamburg was an important coastal town, well fortified but an attractive target to pirates. Particularly troubled by the corsairs of the Barbary Coast, and following the loss in June 1622 of eight fully laden cargo ships, the city determined that it needed to create a fleet of armed convoy ships to protect its interests, escorting merchant and other vessels.

The plans for the construction of Leopoldus Primus and the probably largely identical Wapen von Hamburg started in 1663. The first mention of these plans can be found in the Minutes of the Admiralty of 4 June 1663. While previously they had relied for protection on converted merchant ships, Hamburg now looked to full-fledged warships. On 23 September, the council proposed to build two frigates, and the citizenry voted to enact the plan.

Not much is known about the construction of the Leopoldus Primus. Construction was delayed for unknown reasons, and for several years there were debates about who should take charge of funding the ships, but construction finally began, led by an unknown Dutch ship-master, in 1667. Builders of the period were secretive, so plans were not recorded or shared. The Hamburg sculptor Christian Precht, also known for his work in churches, was hired to create a representation of Leopold I for the stern. This figure is now on display at the Museum of Hamburg History.

The naming of such an important vessel after a strict Catholic Emperor in distant Vienna for a city like Hamburg, Lutheran and uninterested in imperial affairs, was quite unusual. A handwritten contemporary poem suggests that the ship was named for the association of Leopold with military success, perhaps against the Ottoman Empire at the Battle of Saint Gotthard.

The ship was operational in 1668, at some point between April and September. Her first captain was Leopoldus M. Dreyer.

== Construction, equipment and crew ==
A 19th century representation of the cross section of the Leopoldus Primus

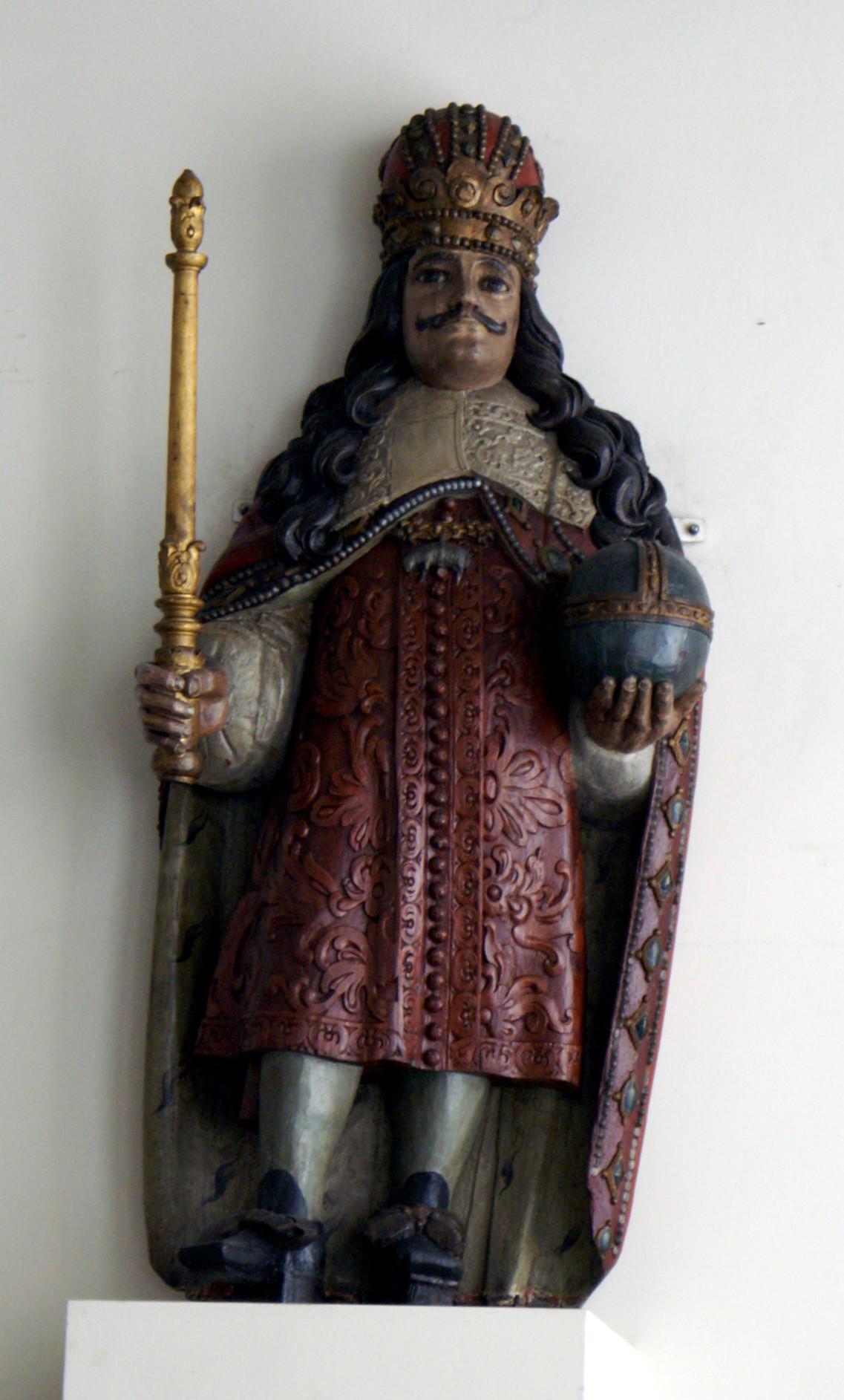
Stern figure of Leopold I, by Christian Precht

There are few records describing the size and appearance of Leopoldus Primus or her sister ship, Wapen von Hamburg. Dimensions are unknown. What is known is that the ship was built on the model of leading Dutch design. Wolfgang Quinger, in Wappen von Hamburg I (1980), suggests that the pair may have been more or less replicas of the Dutch ship Aemilia. If this is so, Leopoldus Primus would have had a length of about 40 metres (130 feet) and a width of almost 11 metres (36 feet). To get over the shoals in the river Elbe, the hull was probably built after the "Rotterdam form". The ship was elaborately decorated with Baroque carvings and sculptures.

The Leopoldus had 54 guns. The heaviest caliber were on the lower gun deck with the lighter on the upper aft decks. When the ship was docked for a length time in Hamburg, the guns could be unloaded and moved to the ramparts of the city to protect it, as was done during a Danish attack on Hamburg in 1686.

Leopoldus Primus had a crew, depending on length and purpose of travel, from around 150 to 250 men, of which about 15 to 20 were officers, including the captain and his lieutenant as well as ministers and the commander of the soldiers. The crew was not stable, but employed for the duration of the trip. Voluntary recruits rather than being pressed into service, they were expected to equip themselves, and more died from diseases caused by unclean conditions on the ship than from battle, at as high a rate as four to one. The 40 to 60 soldiers aboard were better trained and disciplined, taken from the ranks of the city's soldiery or reassigned from other convoy ships.

== Operations and decommissioning ==
The success of Leopoldus Primus is supported by many reports. Captain Berend Jacobsen Karpfanger took her through a number of successful battles against pirates. One highlight is Karpfanger's defense against five French ships in the Elbe estuary on 11 September 1678. Fifty whaling ships were returning to Hamburg from Greenland when the frigates attacked. After a 12-hour battle, two of the French frigates were sunk and the rest put to flight. None of the Hamburg ships were lost, although Leopoldus Primus sustained slight damages. Only two of the crew of Leopoldus were killed, with one man injured. In other activities, the ship was used in 1686 to protect Hamburg from Denmark.

In 1702, Leopoldus Primus was the oldest of the three then existing Hamburg convoy ships when it was badly damaged in a storm. Her captain, Captain Schroeder, had to take port in Falmouth, and it was determined that she was not worth the expense of repair. Schroeder reported this to Hamburg, who rejected a proposal to sell the ship and instead brought her home. There, they determined that if repaired she might continue to sail for another decade. They repaired her at a cost of 3500 marks (1166 pounds) and she was back on the seas, voyaging to Greenland, in 1703.

Before her next trip, concerns that she was not seaworthy were raised, and although some felt she could still manage the voyage to England a few more times, others felt the cost of further repairs was a poor risk. Thirty-six years after embarking on her career as the first convoy ship, Leopoldus Primus was taken out of commission. In 1705, she seems to have been scrapped, probably in Hamburg.

Overall, Leopoldus Primus undertook 22 trips to the Iberian Peninsula, three trips to England and nine trips to protect whalers to Greenland. Among the convoy ships of Hamburg, she had more missions than any other with the Admiralität von Hamburg, which had 32, as her closest rival.

== Sources ==
- Ernst Baasch: Hamburgs Convoyschiffahrt und Convoywesen: ein Beitrag zur Geschichte der Schifffahrt und Schifffahrtseinrichtungen im 17. und 18. Jahrhundert, Hamburg 1896 – Trotz ihres Alters die bis heute einzige Darstellung der Hamburger Konvoischifffahrt, die auf intensiver Quellenarbeit beruht.
- Peter Hessel: Hertzfliessende Betrachtungen / Von dem Elbe Strom, Altona 1675, ohne ISBN.
- Wolfgang Quinger: Wappen von Hamburg I, Rostock 1980.
- Carsten Prange: Hamburg und die Barbaresken – Herausforderungen der Hamburger Kauffahrer durch die Korsaren in Gottes Freund – Aller Welt Feind. Von Seeraub und Konvoifahrt, herausgegeben vom Museum für Hamburgische Geschichte, Hamburg 2001, ISBN 3-9805772-5-2.
