= Russian frigate Oryol (1668) =

Russian ship

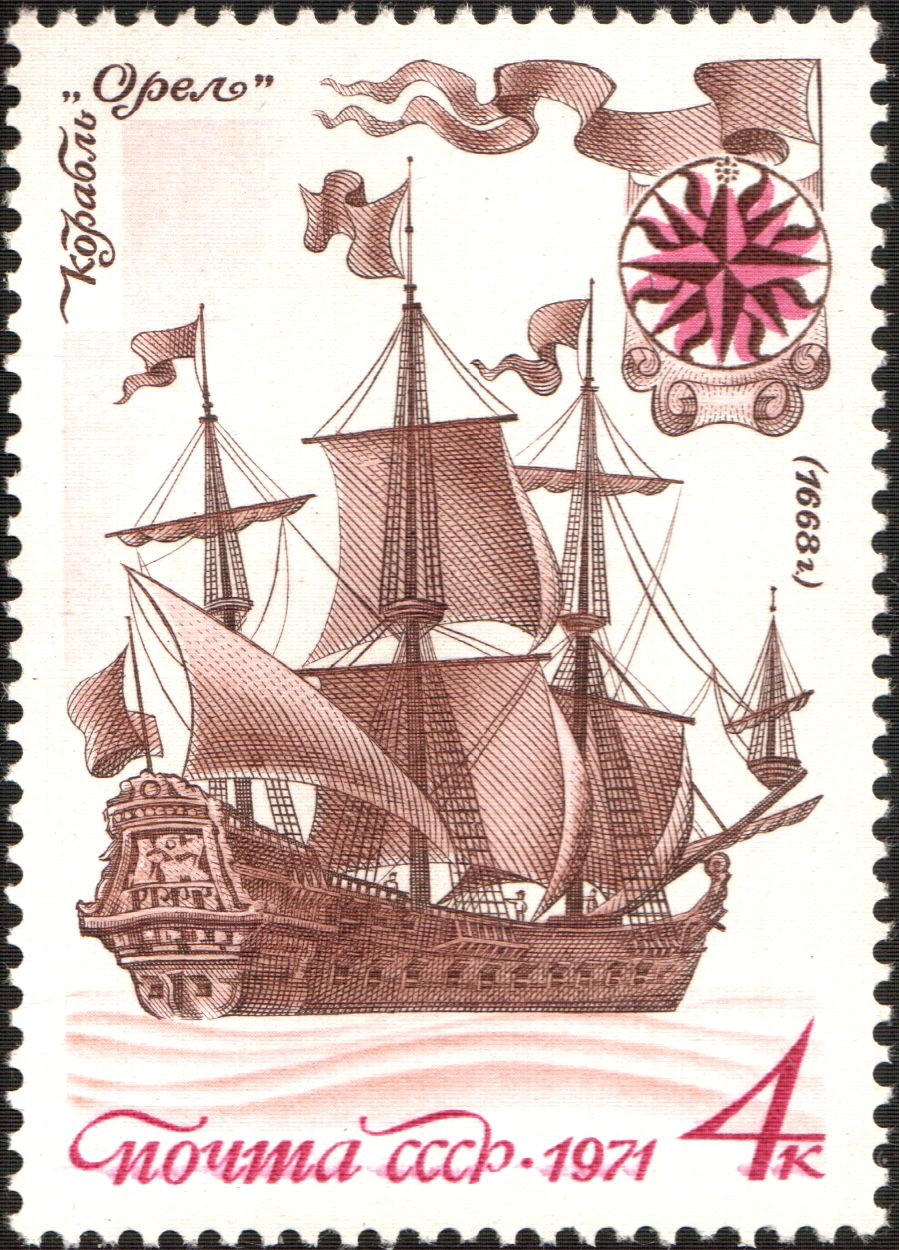
- 1971 Soviet postage stamp honoring Oryol

History

Russia
- Name: Oryol
- Launched: May 1668
- Commissioned: 1667
- In service: 1669
- Out of service: 1670
- Fate: Captured and burnt, 1670

General characteristics
- Displacement: 250 tonnes (250 long tons)
- Length: 24.5 m (80 ft 5 in)
- Beam: 6.5 m (21 ft 4 in)
- Propulsion: Sails
- Sail plan: Full-rigged ship
- Complement: 23 sailors, 35 soldiers
- Armament: 22 guns

Oryol (Russian: Орёл, eagle; also Orel) was a frigate that served in the Russian Navy. It was commissioned by Tsar Alexis I to protect Russian trading ships on the Caspian Sea and became the first Russian-built warship. The ship was built between 1667 and 1669 by the developing shipyard in Dedinovo on the Oka River. Although Oryol was captured and burned in 1670, it has achieved lasting importance as a symbol of the birth of Russian naval power.

Oryol is often considered the first Russian sailing ship of Western European type, even though Frederick (or Friedrich) was built in 1636 in Nizhny Novgorod. However, Frederick sailed in the service of Holstein-Gottorp, not Russia, having been constructed as a joint venture using Russian labor and materials, but Holstein funds and expertise.

== Construction ==
During the 17th century, Russia and Persia developed closer commercial ties, exchanging extravagant embassies and trading in cloth, silk, and other goods. Shipping was conducted across the Caspian Sea and through the Volga River, with Astrakhan as commercial center. This route served to open Persia to commerce not only with Russia but with all of Europe; Dutch and English traders were active, and Adam Olearius was sent as an emissary from Schleswig-Holstein.

In order to protect this growing trade, Tsar Alexis I ordered a naval shipbuilding program. The shipyard was constructed south-east of Moscow in Dedinovo, a town on the Oka River in present-day Moscow Oblast. The project was placed under the Novgorod Chancery, supervised by the boyar Afanasy Ordin-Nashchokin. Experienced sailors were hired from Amsterdam, and Karnelius van Bockhoiven, a Dutchman living in Moscow, was hired for his shipbuilding expertise. Oryol was the first large ship produced, along with a yacht and two smaller vessels. It was a three-masted sailing ship, 24.5 m (80 ft 5 in) in length, 6.5 m (21 ft 4 in) wide, and displacing 250 metric tons (250 long tons; 280 short tons). It had a crew of 23 sailors and 35 soldiers, and was armed with 22 guns.

Although Oryol was launched in 1668, it was not yet finished and spent the winter at dock in Dedinovo. It finally left the shipyard on May 7, 1669, under the command of the Dutch captain David Butler (Davidt Jansz Butlaer). The warship sailed down the Volga to its base in Astrakhan, from which it would protect shipping on the Caspian Sea.

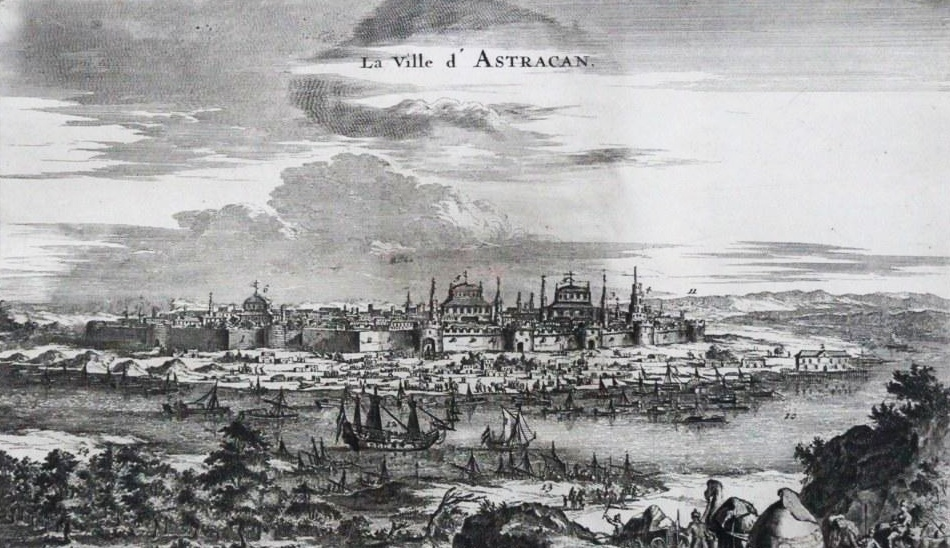
Coenraad Decker. Frigate Oryol in Astrakhan.

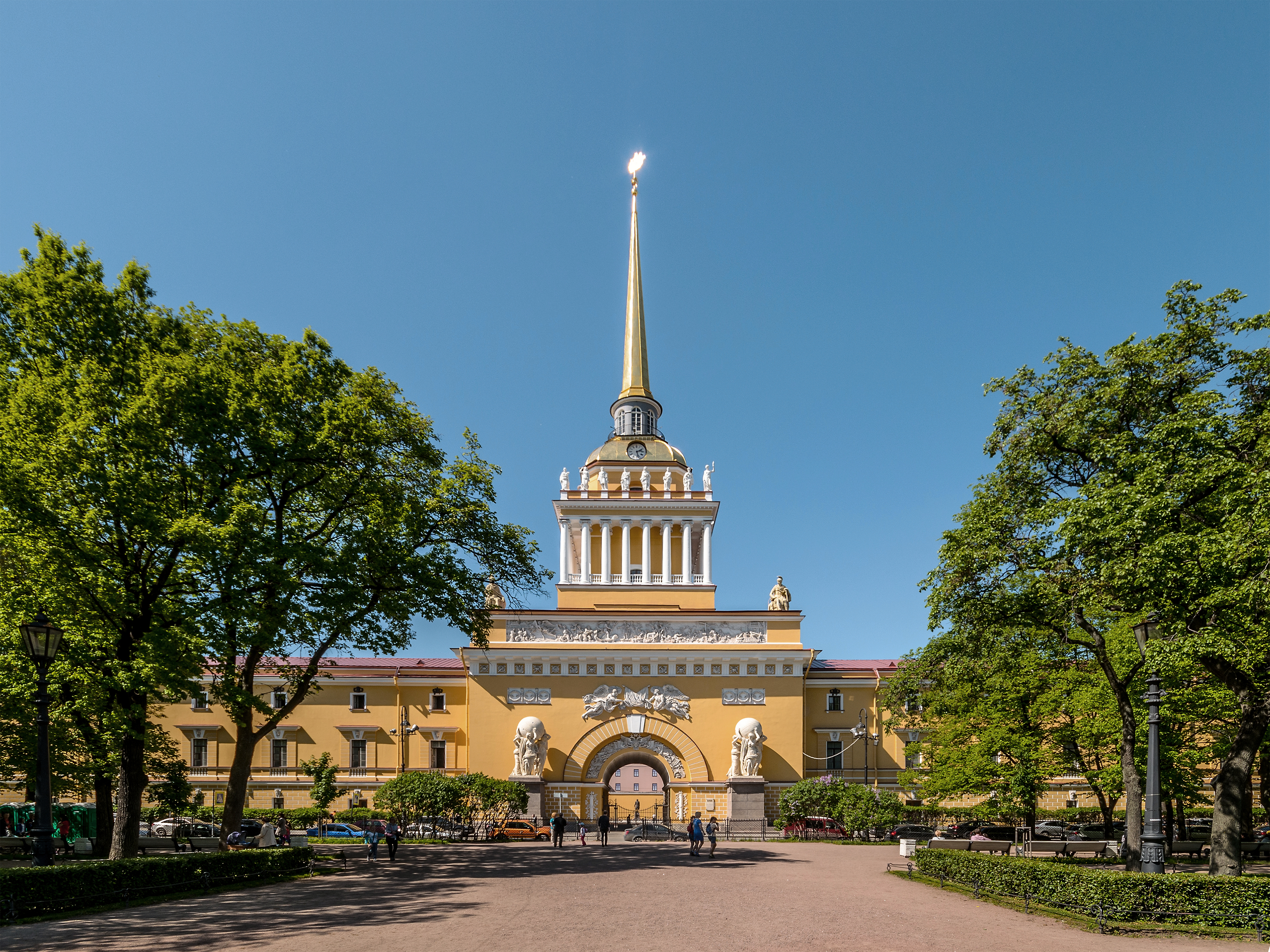
The spire of the Admiralty in Saint Petersburg, topped by golden ship weather-vane.

The sailing-ship emblem from the top of the spire.

== Destruction ==
Oryol arrived in Astrakhan in August 1669, but never fulfilled its mission and may never have sailed on the Caspian Sea. The rebel forces of Stenka Razin were raiding Russian towns, and the ship's guns and men were ordered to defend Astrakhan while the ship sat at anchor. Some of the ship's guns were removed to the citadel, and when the Cossacks attacked the city in June 1670, Oryol was at anchor and undefended. The rebels took the ship and either burned it or disabled and abandoned it in a channel of the river.

Captain Butler's own account of the occupation of Astrakhan and the destruction of Oryol was published in 1683 along with the voyages of the Dutch traveler Jan Struys.

== Symbolic significance ==
The image of a sailing ship at the top of the Admiralty spire in Saint Petersburg bears a strong resemblance to, and may have been modeled after Oryol. The original golden weather-vane, work of the Dutch master Harmen van Bol'es, remained in place until 1886, when it was moved to the Admiralty's naval museum and replaced with an exact copy. The three-masted ship has become an emblem of the city of Saint Petersburg.

The earliest record of the Russian white, blue, and red tricolor comes from the flag flown on Oryol. This flag was later made standard for all Russian ships by Peter the Great. There are several traditional explanations for the choice of colors. According to one version, the design was based on the Dutch flag in honor of the ship's builders and crew. Alternatively, the three colors may have been taken from the insignia of the Grand Duchy of Moscow.
