= Oleg =

Given name

Олег
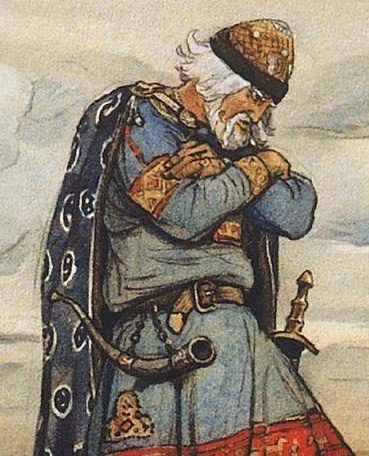
- Oleg of Novgorod by Viktor Vasnetsov
- Romanisation: Oleg
- Pronunciation: English: /ˈoʊlɛɡ/ Russian: [ɐˈlʲek] Ukrainian: [oˈlɛɦ] Belarusian: [aˈlʲeɣ]
- Gender: Male
- Language: Eastern Europe

Origin
- Origin: Old Norse
- Meaning: 'holy'

Other names
- Related names: Olga, Helge

Oleg (Russian: Олег), Oleh (Ukrainian: Олег), or Aleh (Belarusian: Алег) is an East Slavic given name. The name is very common in Russia, Ukraine, and Belаrus.

== Origins ==
Oleg derives from the Old Norse Helgi (Helge), meaning "holy", "sacred", or "blessed". The feminine counterpart is Olga.

== People named Oleg ==
=== Rulers and nobles ===
- Oleg the Wise, 9th–10th-century leader and conqueror of Kievan Rus'
- Oleg of Dereva (died 977), prince of the Derevlians
- Oleg I of Chernigov, Oleg Svyatoslavich of Tmutarakan, 11th–12th century Rus' prince and progenitor of the Olgovichi of Chernigov
- Oleg I of Ryazan, 13th-century prince of Ryazan
- Oleg II of Ryazan, Grand Prince of Ryazan from 1350 to 1402
- Oleg III Svyatoslavich (Prince of Chernigov) (c. 1147–1204)
- Oleg Yaroslavich (1161?–1189), prince of Galicia
- Prince Oleg Konstantinovich of Russia (1892–1914), son of Grand Duke Konstantin Konstantinovich of Russia

=== Others ===
- Oleg Akkuratov (born 1989), Russian musician and singer
- Oleg Aleksandrov (1937–1997), Soviet rower
- Oleg Alekseev (1953–2015), Soviet wrestler
- Oleg Alekseyev (politician) (born 1967), Russian politician
- Oleg Aleynik (born 1989), Russian professional football player
- Oleg Amirbayov (born 1986), Azerbaijani actor
- Oleg Andronic (born 1989), Moldovan footballer
- Oleg Anfimov (1937–2019), Soviet engineer and politician
- Oleg Anikanov (1933–2021), Soviet military officer
- Oleg Anofriyev (1930–2018), Soviet and Russian stage and screen actor, voice actor, singer, songwriter, film director, poet
- Oleg Antonenko (born 1971), Belarusian professional ice hockey left wing
- Oleg Antonov (disambiguation), several people
- Oleg Artemyev (born 1970), Russian cosmonaut
- Oleg Asadulin (born 1971), Russian film director, screenwriter and producer
- Oleg Atkov (born 1949), Russian cosmonaut
- Oleg Avramov (born 1968), Russian footballer
- Oleg Babenkov (born 1985), Russian professional football player
- Oleg Bakhmatyuk (born 1974), Ukrainian businessman and politician
- Oleg Baklanov (1932–2021), Soviet/Ukrainian politician, scientist and businessman
- Oleg Baklov (born 1994), Russian footballer
- Oleg Balan (born 1969), Moldovan jurist and politician
- Oleg Basilashvili (born 1934), Soviet/Russian film and theatre actor
- Oleg Bejenar (1971–2023), Moldovan-Ukrainian football player and manager
- Oleg Belakovsky (1921-2015), Soviet sports doctor
- Oleg Belaventsev (born 1949), Russian military figure and statesman
- Oleg Belokonev (born 1965), Belarusian general
- Oleg Belov (born 1973), Russian ice hockey player
- Oleg Belozyorov (born 1969), Russian politician
- Oleg Belyakov (born 1972), Soviet football goalkeeper
- Oleg Berdos (born 1987), Moldovan road bicycle racer
- Oleg Bernov, musician and member of Russian-American rock band Red Elvises
- Oleg Besov (born 1933), Russian mathematician
- Oleg Betin (1950–2023), the governor of Oblast in Russia
- Oleg Bezuglov (born 1984), musical artist
- Oleg Blinov (born 1978), Russian cosmonaut
- Oleg Blokhin (born 1952), Ukrainian football coach
- Oleg Bodrug (born 1965), Moldovan politician
- Oleg Bogayev (born 1970), Russian playwright based in Yekaterinburg
- Oleg Bogomolov (born 1950), governor of Kurgan Oblast
- Oleg Bolkhovets (born 1976), Russian long-distance runner
- Oleg Boltin (born 1993), Kazakhstani professional wrestler and former amateur wrestler
- Oleg Bolyakin (born 1965), Kazakhstani ice hockey player
- Oleg Bondarik (born 1976), Belarusian cyclist
- Oleg Borisov (1929–1994), Russian film and theatre actor
- Oleg Botsiev, Ambassador of South Ossetia to Abkhazia
- Oleg Bovin (born 1946), Russian water polo player
- Oleg Boyko (born 1964), Russian businessman
- Oleg Bozhev (born 1961), Soviet speed skater
- Oleg Brega (born 1973), Moldovan journalist and activist
- Oleg Bryjak (1960–2015), Kazakhstani operatic bass-baritone
- Oleg Budargin (born 1960), governor of Taymyr Autonomous Okrug in Russia
- Oleg Burlakov (1949–2021), Russian inventor, entrepreneur and billionaire
- Oleg Buryan (born 1959), Russian artist
- Oleg Butković (born 1979), Croatian politician
- Oleg Butman (born 1966), Russian jazz drummer
- Oleg Caetani (born 1956), conductor of Russian and Italian descent
- Oleg Cassini (1913–2006), French-born American fashion designer
- Oleg Chen (born 1988), Russian weightlifter
- Oleg Chernyshov (born 1986), Russian professional football player
- Oleg Chiritso (born 1964), Belarusian weightlifter
- Oleg Chirkunov (born 1958), governor of Perm Krai, Russia
- Oleg Chistyakov (born 1976), Russian professional football player
- Oleg Chizhov (born 1970), Russian serial killer and rapist
- Oleg Chmyrikov (born 1996), Belarusian professional footballer
- Oleg Chukhleba (born 1967), Kazakhstani footballer
- Oleg Chukhontsev (born 1938), Russian poet
- Oleg Chuzhda (born 1985), Ukrainian cyclist
- Oleg Clonin (born 1988), Moldovan football player
- Oleg Crețul (born 1975), Moldovan judoka
- Oleg Dahl (1941–1981), Soviet actor
- Oleg Dal (1941–1981), Soviet actor
- Oleg Danilov (1949–2021), Russian playwright and screenwriter
- Oleg Davydov (1940–2006), Russian economist
- Oleg Davydov (ice hockey) (born 1971), Russian ice hockey player
- Oleg Delov (born 1963), Russian professional football coach and a former player
- Oleg Dementiev (1938–1991), Russian chess player
- Oleg Denishchik (born 1969), triple jumper who represented the USSR and later Belarus
- Oleg Deripaska (born 1968), Russian business oligarch
- Oleg Dimitrov (born 1996), Bulgarian footballer
- Oleg Dimov (born 1968), Russian politician
- Oleg Dineyev (born 1987), Russian footballer
- Oleg Dmitrenko (born 1984), Russian professional football player
- Oleg Dmitriyev (disambiguation), several people
- Oleg Dobrodeev (born 1959), Russian journalist and media manager
- Oleg Dolmatov (born 1948), former Russian footballer and a current manager
- Oleg Dovgopol (born 1975), Transnistrian politician
- Oleg Dozmorov (born 1974), Russian writer and poet
- Oleg Drozdov (born 1966), Ukrainian architect, artist and teacher
- Oleg Dudarin (born 1945), Russian professional football coach and a former player
- Oleg Dulub (born 1965), Belarusian footballer
- Oleg Dyomin (born 1947), former Ambassador Extraordinary and Plenipotentiary of Ukraine to the Russian Federation
- Oleg Efrim (born 1975), Moldovan politician and jurist
- Oleg Emirov (1970–2021), Russian composer, arranger and keyboardist
- Oleg Engachev (born 1967), Qatari sports shooter
- Oleg Eremeev (1922–2016), Russian painter
- Oleg Fatun (born 1959), Russian former track and field sprinter
- Oleg Fediukov (born 1972), American ice dancer
- Oleg Felzer (1939–1998), Azerbaijani composer
- Oleg Fesov (born 1963), musical artist
- Oleg Fistican (born 1975), Moldovan footballer and manager
- Oleg Flentea (born 1964), Moldovan footballer
- Oleg Fomenko (born 1972), Russian footballer
- Oleg Fotin (born 1945), Russian swimmer
- Oleg Gaidukevich (born 1977), Belarusian politician
- Oleg Galkin (1965–2003), Soviet and Ukrainian cyclist
- Oleg Garapuchik (born 1997), Belarusian footballer
- Oleg Garin (disambiguation), several people
- Oleg Gazenko (1918–2007), Soviet scientist and general officer
- Oleg Gazmanov (born 1951), Russian singer, composer and poet
- Oleg Gerasimenko (born 1990), Russian footballer
- Oleg Gogol (born 1968), Belarusian wrestler
- Oleg Golikov (born 1968), Russian politician
- Oleg Golovanov (1934–2019), Russian rower
- Oleg Goncharenko (1931–1986), Soviet speed skater
- Oleg Gordievsky (1938–2025), Soviet KGB agent who defected to the UK
- Oleg Gorobiy (born 1971), Russian canoeist
- Oleg Goroshko (born 1989), Belarusian ice hockey player
- Oleg Govorun (born 1969), Russian politician
- Oleg Grabar (1929–2011), French archeologist and historian of Islamic art, working in the United States
- Oleg Grachev (born 1974), Russian ice hockey player
- Oleg Grams (born 1984), Russian handball player
- Oleg Grebnev (born 1968), Russian handball player
- Oleg Grigoryev (born 1937), Russian boxer
- Oleg Grinevsky (1930–2019), Russian diplomat
- Oleg Grishkin (born 1975), Russian cyclist
- Oleg Grushecki (born 1974), Belarusian writer and translator
- Oleg Gubanov (born 1977), Russian footballer
- Oleg Gubin (born 1981), Russian ice hockey player
- Oleg Gudymo (1944–2024), Transnistrian politician
- Oleg Gusev (disambiguation), several people
- Oleg Gutsol (born 1982), Ukrainian-Canadian internet entrepreneur
- Oleg Haslavsky (1948–2021), Russian poet, painter and translator
- Oleg Hromțov (born 1983), Moldovan footballer
- Oleg Ichim (born 1979), Moldovan footballer
- Oleg Imrekov (1962–2014), Russian footballer
- Oleg Isayenko (born 2000), Russian footballer
- Oleg Ishchenko (born 1994), rugby player
- Oleg Ishutkin (born 1975), Russian race walker
- Oleg Itskhoki (born 1983), Russian-American economist
- Oleg Ivaninsky (born 1966), Russian politician
- Oleg Ivanov (born 1986), Russian footballer
- Oleg Ivanov (footballer, born 1967), Russian footballer
- Oleg Ivanovsky (1922–2014), Soviet aerospace engineer
- Oleg Ivenko (born 1996), Ukrainian ballet dancer and actor
- Oleg Izhboldin, Russian mathematician
- Oleg D. Jefimenko (1922–2009), Ukrainian-American physicist and Professor Emeritus at West Virginia University
- Oleg Juravlyov (born 1982), Uzbekistani painter
- Oleg Kagan (1946–1990), Soviet violinist
- Oleg Kalashnikov (1962–2015), Ukrainian politician
- Oleg Kalidov (born 1951), Soviet canoeist
- Oleg Kalugin (born 1934), Russian activist and KGB general
- Oleg Kalugin (footballer) (born 1989), Russian footballer
- Oleg Kamshylov (born 1969), Russian statesman and lawyer
- Oleg Kapustnikov (born 1972), Kazakhstani footballer
- Oleg Karavaychuk (1927–2016), Russian composer
- Oleg Karavayev (1936–1978), Soviet wrestler
- Oleg Karpov (born 1965), Soviet equestrian
- Oleg Kazmirchuk (born 1968), Kyrgyzstani and Ukrainian footballer
- Oleg Kashin (born 1980), Russian journalist and writer
- Oleg Kechko (born 1967), Belarusian weightlifter
- Oleg Ken (1960–2007), Russian historian
- Oleg Kerensky (1905–1984), Russian civil engineer
- Oleg Khafizov (born 1959), Russian writer
- Oleg Khandayev (born 1964), Soviet hockey player
- Oleg Kharytonov (born 1988), Ukrainian canoeist
- Oleg Khlestov (1923–2021), Soviet diplomat
- Oleg Khlevniuk (born 1959), Russian historian
- Oleg Khmyl (born 1970), Belarusian ice hockey player
- Oleg Khodkov (born 1974), Russian handball player
- Oleg Khoma (born 1966), Ukrainian translator and historian
- Oleg Khopyorsky (born 1959), Olympic sailor from the Soviet Union
- Oleg Khorokhordin (born 1972), Russian politician
- Oleg Khorzhan (1976–2023), Transnistrian politician
- Oleg Khvatsovas (1967–2021), Belarusian sport shooter
- Oleg Khvostov (born 1972), Russian painter
- Oleg Kiselyov (born 1967), Russian handball player
- Oleg Komov (1932–1994), Russian sculptor
- Oleg Dmitriyevich Kononenko (born 1964), Russian cosmonaut
- Oleg Grigoriyevich Kononenko (1938–1980), Soviet cosmonaut
- Oleg Kononov (born 1966), Russian footballer
- Oleg Kornienko (born 1973), Kazakhstani-Russian footballer
- Oleg A. Korolev (born 1968), Russian artist
- Oleg Kosarev (born 1966), Soviet-Russian serial rapist
- Oleg Koshevoy (1926–1943), Soviet partisan and co-founder of the Soviet resistance group, the Young Guard
- Oleg Kostin (born 1992), Russian swimmer
- Oleg Kosyak (born 1975), Ukrainian gymnast and sports coach
- Oleg Kotov (born 1965), Russian physician and cosmonaut
- Oleg Kovalenko (ice hockey) (born 1975), Russian ice hockey player
- Oleg Kovalyov (disambiguation), several people
- Oleg Kozhemyakin (born 1995), Russian footballer
- Oleg Kozhemyako (born 1962), Russian politician
- Oleg Krasikov (born 1999), Russian curler
- Oleg Krasilnichenko (born 1997), Russian footballer
- Oleg Krishtal, Ukrainian neurophysiologist
- Oleg Krivonogov (1938–2021), Soviet and Russian diplomat
- Oleg Krivonosov (born 1961), Latvian chess player
- Oleg Kroshkin (1950–2020), Belarusian artist
- Oleg Krushin (1966–1992), Russian footballer
- Oleg Kryazhev (born 1970), Kazakhstani ice hockey player
- Oleg Kryoka (born 1987), Ukrainian Greco-Roman wrestler
- Oleg Leonidovich Kryzhanovsky (1918–1997), Russian entomologist
- Oleg Kubarev (born 1966), Belarusian footballer and manager
- Oleg Kudryashov (1932–2022), Russian painter and printmaker
- Oleg Kukhta (born 1970), Russian singer songwriter
- Oleg Kuleshov (born 1974), Russian handball player
- Oleg Kuleshov (skier) (born 1976), Belarusian freestyle skier
- Oleg Kulik, Ukrainian-born Russian artist
- Oleg Kulkov (born 1978), Russian marathon runner
- Oleg Kurguskin (born 1966), Russian motorcycle speedway rider
- Oleg Kutscherenko (born 1968), Ukrainian-German wrestler
- Oleg Kuvaev (born 1967), Russian artist, designer and animator
- Oleg Kuvshinnikov (born 1965), Russian politician
- Oleg Kuzhlev (born 1966), Russian footballer
- Oleg Kuzmin (born 1981), Russian footballer
- Oleg Kuznetsov (serial killer) (1969–2000), Soviet-Russian serial killer and rapist
- Oleg Ladik (born 1971), Ukrainian-born Canadian Olympic wrestler
- Oleg Lanin (born 1996), Russian footballer
- Oleg Lebedev (disambiguation), several people
- Oleg Leonov (disambiguation), several people
- Oleg Lepik (born 1973), Russian-born Estonian footballer
- Oleg Li (born 1991), Russian ice hockey player
- Oleg Lidrik (born 1971), Russian footballer and official
- Oleg Lipchenko (born 1957), Canadian artist and illustrator
- Oleg Litvinenko (1973–2007), Kazakhstani footballer
- Oleg Lobov (1937–2018), Russian politician
- Oleg Lomakin (1924–2010), Russian painter
- Oleg Losev (1903–1942), Russian scientist and inventor
- Oleg Lotov (born 1975), Kazakhstani footballer
- Oleg Lundstrem (1916–2005), Russian composer
- Oleg Lupanov (1932–2006), Russian mathematician
- Oleg Lyalin (1937–1995), Soviet agent who defected from the KGB
- Oleg Lyashko (disambiguation), several people
- Oleg Lyubelskiy (1962–1994), Russian footballer
- Oleg Maisenberg (1945–2026), Russian-Austrian pianist and teacher
- Oleg Makara (born 1954), Slovak director and writer
- Oleg Makarevich (born 1962), Russian general
- Oleg Makarov (disambiguation), several people
- Oleg Maltsev (born 1967), Russian judoka
- Oleg Maltsev (psychologist) (born 1975), Ukrainian psychologist
- Oleg Olegovich Malyukov (born 1985), Russian footballer and coach
- Oleg Manaev (born 1952), Belarusian sociologist
- Oleg Marichev (born 1945), Russian mathematician
- Oleg Markov (born 1996), Australian rules footballer
- Oleg Maskaev (born 1969), Russian-American boxer
- Oleg Matveychev (born 1970), Russian politician
- Oleg Matytsin (born 1964), Russian statesman
- Oleg Mavromati (born 1965), Russian artist-actionist and a filmmaker
- Oleg Medvedev (born 1985), Russian luger
- Oleg Mekhov (born 1966), Russian footballer
- Oleg Melnichenko (born 1973), Russian politician
- Oleg Menshikov (born 1960), Russian actor, theater director and singer
- Oleg Mikhaylov (disambiguation), several people
- Oleg Mikulchik (born 1964), Belarusian ice hockey player
- Oleg V. Minin (born 1960), Russian physicist
- Oleg Minko (1938–2013), Ukrainian painter
- Oleg Mirny (born 1963), Russian footballer and coach
- Oleg Miron (born 1956), Olympic sailor from the Soviet Union
- Oleg Mishukov (born 1980), Russian sprinter
- Oleg Mityaev (born 1956), Russian bard, musician and actor
- Oleg Mityaev (general), Russian major-general
- Oleg Moldovan (born 1966), Moldovan sport shooter
- Oleg Moliboga (1953–2022), Russian volleyball player and coach
- Oleg Morgun (born 1967), Ukrainian separatist politician
- Oleg Morozov (disambiguation), several people
- Oleg Murachyov (born 1995), Russian footballer
- Oleg Murayenko, executed Kazakhstani serial killer
- Oleg Musin (born 1975), Kazakhstani footballer
- Oleg Mutt (1920–1986), Estonian linguist and translator
- Oleg Mutu (born 1972), Romanian cinematographer and film producer
- Oleg Nagornov (born 1956), Russian physicist and mathematician
- Oleg Narinyan (born 1961), Russian curler and coach
- Oleg Naumenko (born 1986), Ukrainian wheelchair fencer
- Oleg Naumov, Russian mass murderer
- Oleg Nechayev (born 1971), Russian footballer
- Oleg Nedashkovskiy (born 1987), Kazakhstani footballer
- Oleg Negrobov (1941–2021), Russian entomologist
- Oleg Neikirch (1914–1985), Bulgarian chess player
- Oleg Nejlik (born 1984), Swedish singer
- Oleg Nikiforenko (born 2001), Belarusian footballer
- Oleg Nikolaenko (born 1987), Russian computer programmer, accused cyber-spammer
- Oleg Nikolayev (disambiguation), several people
- Oleg Nikulin (1970–2006), Russian footballer
- Oleg Nilov (born 1962), Russian politician, Member of the State Duma
- Oleg Normatov (born 1981), Uzbekistani hurdler
- Oleg Novachuk (born 1971), Kazakh businessman, currently Chief Executive of Kazakhmys
- Oleg Novitskiy (born 1971), Russian cosmonaut
- Oleg Ogorodov (born 1972), Uzbekistani tennis player
- Oleg Orlov (born 1953), Russian human rights activist
- Oleg Oshenkov (1911–1976), Soviet footballer
- Oleg Ovsyannikov (born 1970), Russian ice dancer
- Oleg Oznobikhin (born 2002), Russian footballer
- Oleg Pankov (born 1967), Ukrainian cyclist
- Oleg Panteleyev (1952–2016), Russian statesman
- Oleg Panyutin (born 1983), Azerbaijani Paralympic athlete
- Oleg Parada (born 1969), Russian footballer
- Oleg Pashinin (born 1974), Uzbekistani footballer
- Oleg Pavlov (1970–2018), Russian writer
- Oleg Pavlov (speed skater) (born 1966), Russian speed skater
- Oleg Penkovsky (1919–1963), Soviet colonel
- Oleg Perepelitsyn (born 1969), Russian footballer
- Oleg Perepetchenov (born 1975), Russian weightlifter
- Oleg Petrosyan (born 1977), Russian serial killer
- Oleg Petrov (born 1971), Russian former ice hockey right winger
- Oleg Petrov (bobsleigh) (born 1967), Russian bobsledder
- Oleg Petrov (footballer) (born 1968), Russian footballer
- Oleg Pichugin (born 1974), Russian footballer and coach
- Oleg Piganovich (born 1985), Russian ice hockey player
- Oleg Pinchuk (born 1960), Ukrainian artist
- Oleg Platonov (born 1950), Russian holocaust denier
- Oleg Platov (born 1983), Russian holocaust denier
- Oleg Podruzhko (born 1964), Russian footballer
- Oleg Pogodin (born 1965), Russian film director and screenwriter
- Oleg Pogudin (born 1968), Russian actor and singer
- Oleg Polyakov (born 1990), Russian footballer
- Oleg Polyarush (born 1977), Ukrainian footballer
- Oleg Ponomarev (born 1992), Russian Paralympic Nordic skier
- Oleg Ponomaryov (born 1991), Russian footballer
- Oleg Popov (1930–2016), Soviet and Russian clown and circus artist
- Oleg Postnov (born 1962), Russian author
- Oleg Pravilo (born 1988), Russian footballer
- Oleg Prezhdo (born 1970), Ukrainian-American physical chemist
- Oleg Prihodko (born 1997), Ukrainian tennis player
- Oleg Prokofiev (1928–1998), Russian artist, son of Sergei Prokofiev
- Oleg Proleskovsky, Belarusian politician
- Oleg Protopopov (1932–2023), Russian figure skater
- Oleg Prudius (born 1972), Ukrainian professional wrestler known by his ring name Vladimir Kozlov
- Oleh Psiuk (born 1994), Ukrainian rapper and songwriter, who is the founder and frontman of the rap group Kalush
- Oleg Pukhnatiy (born 1975), Uzbekistani swimmer
- Oleg Rabota (born 1990), Kazakhstani swimmer
- Oleg Radushko (born 1967), Belarusian footballer and coach
- Oleg Rayko (born 1945), Soviet middle distance runner
- Oleg Reabciuk (born 1998), Moldovan footballer
- Oleg Reidman (born 1952), Moldovan politician
- Oleg Riabokon (born 1973), Ukrainian lawyer and politician
- Oleg Roganov (born 1995), Russian footballer
- Oleg Romanishin (born 1952), Ukrainian chess player
- Oleg Romanov (ice hockey) (born 1970), Belarusian ice hockey player
- Oleg Romanov (politician) (born 1975), Belarusian politician
- Oleg Romantsev (born 1954), Russian footballer and manager
- Oleg Rozin (born 1965), Russian footballer
- Oleg Rudnov (1948–2015), Russian businessman
- Oleg Rukhlevich (1974–2023), Belarusian swimmer
- Oleg Ryakhovskiy (1933–2023), Soviet triple jumper
- Oleg Rydny (born 1967), Russian footballer and coach
- Oleg Rykhlevich (born 1974), Belarusian freestyle swimmer
- Oleg Rylkov, Russian serial killer, serial rapist and pedophile
- Oleg Ryzhenkov (born 1967), Belarusian biathlete
- Oleg Sadikhov (born 1966), Israeli Olympic weightlifter
- Oleg Saitov (born 1974), Russian boxer
- Oleg Sakirkin (1966–2015), Kazakh and Soviet triple jumper
- Oleg Salenko (born 1969), Russian-Ukrainian footballer
- Oleg Salnikov (born 1975), Russian footballer
- Oleg Salyukov (born 1955), Russian army general
- Oleg Samatov (born 1965), Russian footballer
- Oleg Samorukov (born 1972), Russian footballer and coach
- Oleg Samsonov (born 1987), Russian footballer
- Oleg Sapožnin (1931–2014), Estonian sports official and sports personnel
- Oleg Saprykin (born 1981), Russian ice hockey player
- Oleg Savchenko (disambiguation), several people
- Oleg Savelyev (born 1965), Russian politician
- Oleg Seleznyov (1959–2021), Russian politician
- Oleg Semyonov-Tyan-Shansky (1906–1990), Soviet ornithologist
- Oleg Sentsov (born 1976), Ukrainian filmmaker, writer and activist
- Oleg Serbin (born 1982), Ukrainian librarian
- Oleg Serebrian (born 1969), Moldovan diplomat and politician
- Oleg Sergeyev (born 1968), Russian footballer
- Oleg Sergeyev (sprinter) (born 1975), Russian sprinter
- Oleg Shafarenko (born 1981), Ukrainian ice hockey player
- Oleg Shalayev (born 1992), Russian footballer
- Oleg Shamaev (born 1982), Uzbekistani alpine skier
- Oleg Shargorodsky (born 1969), Russian ice hockey player
- Oleg Shatov (born 1990), Russian footballer
- Oleg Shatskikh (born 1974), Uzbekistani footballer
- Oleg Shatunov (born 1967), Russian volleyball player
- Oleg Shcherbakov (born 1966), Russian association football player
- Oleg Shein (born 1972), Russian politician
- Oleg Shelestenko (born 1972), Spanish canoeist
- Oleg Shelyutov (born 1988), Russian footballer
- Oleg Shenin (1937–2009), Soviet politician
- Oleg Shevtsov (born 1971), Russian ice hockey player
- Oleg Shinkaryov (born 1965), Russian footballer and official
- Oleg Shteynikov (born 1985), Kazakhstani freestyle swimmer
- Oleg Shupliak (born 1967), Ukrainian artist
- Oleg Shutov (born 1988), Ukrainian footballer
- Oleg Skopintsev (born 1984), Russian handball player
- Oleg Skorkin (1961–2025), Russian footballer
- Oleg Skripochka (born 1969), Russian engineer and cosmonaut
- Oleg Skrypka (born 1964), Ukrainian musician, vocalist, composer, and leader of the group Vopli Vidoplyasova
- Oleg Smolin (born 1952), Russian politician and philosopher
- Oleg Smirnov (disambiguation), several people
- Oleg Sobirov (born 1981), Uzbekistani footballer
- Oleg Sokolov (born 1956), Russian historian and convinced murder
- Oleg Soldatov (born 1963), Russian conductor
- Oleg Solodovnik (born 1966), Russian and Ukrainian futsal coach
- Oleg Solomakhin (born 1971), Belarusian rower
- Oleg Solovyov (born 1973), Ukrainian footballer
- Oleg Sõnajalg (1959–2025), Estonian entrepreneur
- Oleg Soskovets (born 1949), Russian politician
- Oleg Starykh, Russian physicist
- Oleg Starynskyi (born 1985), Ukrainian football manager
- Oleg Stefan (born 1959), Ukrainian-born American actor
- Oleg Stepanenko (born 1939), Ukrainian hurdler
- Oleg Stepanov (1939–2010), Russian judoka
- Oleg Stepko (born 1994), Ukrainian and Azerbaijani artistic gymnast
- Oleg Stogov (born 1965), Russian footballer
- Oleg Stoyanovskiy (born 1996), Russian beach volleyball player
- Oleg Strakhanovich (born 1979), Belarusian footballer
- Oleg Strizhakov (born 1963), Russian long-distance runner
- Oleg Strizhenov (1929–2025), Soviet and Russian actor
- Oleg Sudakov (born 1962), musical artist
- Oleg Sukhoruchenko (born 1965), Russian bobsledder
- Oleg Sushkov, Australian nuclear physicist
- Oleg Suvorov (born 1997), Russian footballer
- Oleg Sveshnikov, Soviet rower
- Oleg Svyatoslavich (disambiguation), several people
- Oleg Syomin (born 1974), Russian footballer
- Oleg Syrokvashko (1961–2016), Belarusian footballer
- Oleg Tabakov (1935–2018), Soviet and Russian actor
- Oleg Tabunov (born 1969), Russian footballer
- Oleg Taktarov, (born 1967) Russian mixed martial artist and actor
- Oleg Tamarin (1937–2005), Russian composer
- Oleg Tarabanov (born 1997), Russian footballer
- Oleg Tarnovschi (born 1992), Moldovan canoeist
- Oleg Ten (born 1975), Russian serial killer
- Oleg Teryokhin (born 1970), Russian footballer
- Oleg Teziev (born 1948), South Ossetian politician
- Oleg Timofeyev (born 1963), American musicologist
- Oleg Tinkov (born 1967), Russian entrepreneur and businessman
- Oleg Tolbanov (born 1947), Russian physicist
- Oleg Tolmachev (1919–2008), Soviet ice hockey player and coach
- Oleg Tolstikov (1905–1971), Soviet Air Force colonel general
- Oleg Tonoritchi (born 1973), Moldovan cyclist
- Oleg Trifonov (born 1981), Russian footballer
- Oleg Troshin (born 1964), Soviet racewalker
- Oleg Troyanovsky (1919–2003), Soviet diplomat
- Oleg Trubachyov (1930–2002), Soviet and Russian linguist
- Oleg Tsaryov (born 1970), Ukrainian-Russian politician, businessman and separatist
- Oleg Tselkov (1934–2021), Russian nonconformist artist
- Oleg Tsepkin (born 1965), Russian politician
- Oleg Tsokov (1971–2023), Russian general
- Oleg Tsvetkovskiy (born 1970), Uzbekistani swimmer
- Oleg Țulea (born 1980), Moldovan politician
- Oleg Tverdovsky (born 1976), Ukrainian-Russian ice hockey player
- Oleg Tyurin (1937–2010), Russian rower
- Oleg Umurzakov (1967–2021), Russian footballer
- Oleg Valenchuk (born 1960), Russian politician
- Oleg Valjalo (born 1970), Croatian politician
- Oleg Vasilenko (born 1973), Russian professional football manager
- Oleg Vasiliev (disambiguation), several people
- Oleg Velyky (1977–2010), German handball player
- Oleg Veretelnikov (born 1972), Uzbekistani decathlete
- Oleg Veretennikov (born 1970), Russian footballer
- Oleg Verniaiev (born 1993), Ukrainian gymnast
- Oleg Vernigorov (born 1972), Russian footballer
- Oleg Vikulov (born 1987), Russian diver
- Oleg Vinogradov (born 1937), Russian choreographer and educator
- Oleg Vinogradov (rower) (born 1984), Estonian rower
- Oleg Viro (born 1948), Russian mathematician
- Oleg Vlasov (born 1984), Russian footballer
- Oleg Volkov (born 1958), Russian pianist
- Oleg Volokh (born 1942), Belarusian footballer and manager
- Oleg Voloshyn (born 1981), Russian-Ukrainian journalist, political pundit, and former government official
- Oleg Voskoboynikov (born 1971), Kazakhstani footballer
- Oleg Voyko (born 1980), Ukrainian ice dancer
- Oleg Vyshniakov (born 1965), Ukrainian businessman and public figure
- Oleg Vyugin (born 1952), Russian economist and professor
- Oleg Wirth, Russian serial killer
- Oleg Woolf (1954–2011), Moldovan-Soviet writer
- Oleg Yakovlev (disambiguation), several people
- Oleg Yankovsky (1944–2009), Soviet and Russian actor
- Oleg Yashin (born 1990), Russian ice hockey player
- Oleg Yefremov (1927–2000), Soviet and Russian actor and producer
- Oleg Yelyshev (born 1971), Russian footballer
- Oleg Yem (born 1974), Kazakhstani weightlifter
- Oleg Yeprintsev (born 1962), Russian footballer
- Oleg Yeremeyev (born 1979), Kazakhstani ice hockey player
- Oleg Yermakov (born 1961), Russian writer
- Oleg Yermolin (born 1972), Russian luger
- Oleg Yerofeyev (1940–2022), Russian navy admiral
- Oleg Yeryomin (born 1967), Russian footballer
- Oleg Yesayan (born 1946), Armenian politician and diplomat
- Oleg Yevdokimov (born 1994), Belarusian footballer
- Oleg Yevenko (born 1991), Belarusian ice hockey player
- Oleg Yolkin (born 1986), Russian footballer
- Oleg Zagorodnev (born 1959), Russian field hockey player
- Oleg Zaikin (1972–2006), Russian serial killer
- Oleg Zaionchkovsky (born 1959), Russian author
- Oleg Zatsarinny (1953–2021), Ukrainian-American theoretical and computational physicist
- Oleg Zaytsev (1939–1993), Russian ice hockey player
- Oleg Zelenin (born 1989), Russian footballer
- Oleg Zemlyakov (born 1993), Kazakhstani cyclist
- Oleg Zernikel (born 1995), German pole vaulter
- Oleg Zhegoyev (born 1945), Soviet canoeist
- Oleg Zherebetskyy (born 1986), Ukrainian luger
- Oleg Zhestkov (born 1987), Russian canoeist
- Oleg Zhivetin (born 1964), Russian painter
- Oleg Zhivotnikov (born 1967), Russian footballer
- Oleg Zhukov (born 1976), Russian bicycle racer
- Oleg Zhukovskiy (born 1970), Belarusian high jumper
- Oleg Znarok (born 1963), Latvian ice hockey player
- Oleg Zoteyev (born 1989), Uzbekistani footballer
- Oleg Zurabiani (born 1957), Georgian judoka
- Oleg Zykov (born 1970), Russian footballer and coach

== Fictional characters ==
=== Film ===
- Oleg, Don Shirley's cellist in Green Book, played by Dimiter D. Marinov

=== Television ===
- Vanko Oleg Golishevsky, on 2 Broke Girls
- Oleg Igorevich Burov, a Soviet KGB officer played by Costa Ronin on The Americans
- Oleg the Prophet, ruler of Kiev, played by Danila Kozlovsky on Vikings (based on Oleg of Novgorod)
- Oleg Mikcic, portrayed by Karl Herlinger on season 7 of Dexter

=== Video games ===
- Oleg, the original name of Teach from Xenoblade Chronicles 3
- Oleg Kirlov, the character in video games Saints Row: The Third, Saints Row IV, Agents of Mayhem
