= Savchenko =

Savchenko (Ukrainian and Russian: Са́вченко) is a surname of Ukrainian origin. It may refer to the following people:

- Aleksei Savchenko (born 1975), Russian footballer
- Aliona Savchenko (born 1984), German-Ukrainian pair skater
- Anastasia Savchenko (born 1989), Russian pole vaulter
- Andriy Savchenko (ice hockey) (born 1972), Ukrainian ice hockey player
- Andriy Savchenko (footballer) (born 1994), Ukrainian footballer
- Boris Savchenko (born 1986), Russian chess grandmaster
- Filipp Savchenko (born 1991), Russian ice hockey player
- Gleb Savchenko (born 1983), Russian dancer and choreographer
- Igor Savchenko (1906–1950), Soviet-Ukrainian filmmaker
- Ivan Savchenko (1908–1999), Soviet KGB general
- Larisa Neiland, née Savchenko (born 1966), Soviet and Latvian tennis player
- Mikhail Savchenko (born 1980), Ukrainian-Russian footballer
- Nadiya Savchenko (born 1981), Ukrainian military pilot and politician
- Oleg Savchenko (disambiguation), several people
- Oleksandr Savchenko (born 1957), Ukrainian politician
- Oleksiy Savchenko (born 1993), Ukrainian footballer
- Oxana Savchenko (born 1990), Russian Paralympic swimmer
- Roman Savchenko (born 1986), Kazakhstani ice hockey player
- Ruslan Savchenko (born 1971), Ukrainian weightlifter
- Sergey Savchenko (born 1949), Ukrainian artist
- Stanislav Savchenko (born 1967), Ukrainian chess grandmaster
- Svetlana Savchenko
- Victor A. Savchenko (born 1961), Ukrainian historian and writer
- Viktor Savchenko (born 1952), Soviet-Ukrainian boxer
- Viktor Savchenko (athlete) (born 1948), Ukrainian hurdler
- Volodymyr Ivanovych Savchenko (1933–2005), Soviet-Ukrainian science fiction writer
- Volodymyr Mykolayovych Savchenko (born 1973), Ukrainian footballer
- Yekaterina Savchenko (born 1977), Russian high jumper
- Yevgeny Savchenko (born 1950), Russian politician

== See also ==
- Savchenkov
- Shevchenko
