= Oleg (disambiguation) =

Oleg is a Slavic masculine given name.

Oleg may also refer to

== Film ==
- Oleg (film), a 2019 Latvian drama film directed by Juris Kursietis
- Oleg: The Oleg Vidov Story, a 2021 documentary film directed by Nadia Tass

== Other uses ==
- Oleg (dance) in Indonesia
- Oleg Cassini, Inc., an American fashion house
- Russian ship Oleg, multiple articles

== See also ==
- Oleh (disambiguation)
