= Helge =

- Gender: Male

Origin
- Origin: Old Norse
- Meaning: Holy
- Region of origin: Scandinavia

Other names
- Related names: Helgi, Helje, Hølje, Halga, Oleg, Olga, Helga

Helge or Helgi is a Scandinavian, German, and Dutch mostly male name.

The name is derived from Proto-Norse Hailaga with its original meaning being dedicated to the gods. For its Slavic version, see Oleg. Its feminine equivalent is Olga.

== Notable people with this name ==
- Halga, legendary Danish king mentioned in Beowulf and in medieval Scandinavian sources
- Helgi Hjörvarðsson, Scandinavian hero from Helgakviða Hjörvarðssonar, in the Poetic Edda
- Helgi Hundingsbane, Scandinavian hero who figures in the Völsunga saga and who has two poems in the Poetic Edda
- Helgi Haddingjaskati, Swedish hero from Hrómundar saga Gripssonar
- Helge (Danish king), 9th-century king
- Helge Akre (1903–1986), Norwegian diplomat
- Helge Bostrom (1894–1977), Canadian ice hockey player
- Helge Dohrmann (1939–1989), Danish politician
- Helge Jung (1886–1978), Swedish general
- Helge von Koch (1870–1924), Swedish mathematician
- Helge Larsen (1915–2000), Danish politician
- Helge Rosvaenge (1897–1972), Danish-German operatic tenor
- Helgi Sallo (born 1941), Estonian singer and actress
- Helge Schneider (born 1955), German comedian, musician, actor and director
- Helgi the Sharp (disambiguation), several people
- Helge Skoog (born 1938), Swedish actor
- Helge Söderbom (1881–1975), Swedish Army lieutenant general
- Helge Talvitie (born 1941), Finnish sheet metal worker and politician
- Helgi Tómasson (disambiguation), several people
- Helge Uuetoa (1936–2008), Estonian painter, stage and film set designer

=== Fictional characters ===
- Helge Doppler, a character in Netflix's 2017 series Dark

== See also ==
- Helge or Helgas, an ancient city and former bishopric, now a Latin Catholic titular see as Germanicopolis (Bithynia)
- Helga
