= Sergey Mironov (footballer) =

Russian footballer

Personal information
- Full name: Sergey Nikolayevich Mironov
- Date of birth: 13 March 1988 (age 38)
- Place of birth: Novgorod, USSR
- Height: 1.81 m (5 ft 11 in)
- Position: Defensive midfielder

Youth career
- 1999–2002: SDYuShOR of Novgorod
- 2003–2004: Smena

Senior career*
| Years | Team | Apps | (Gls) |
| 2005–2008 | FC Zenit St. Petersburg | 0 | (0) |
| 2008 | → TP-47 (loan) | 8 | (0) |
| 2008 | → OFC Sliven 2000 (loan) | 3 | (0) |
| 2009 | FC Smena-Zenit St. Petersburg | 34 | (1) |
| 2010 | FC Dynamo Vologda | 26 | (1) |
| 2011 | JK Kalev Sillamäe | 30 | (1) |
| 2012 | FC Ufa | 8 | (0) |
| 2012 | FC Avangard Kursk | 18 | (0) |
| 2013–2014 | FC Piter Saint Petersburg | 8 | (1) |
| 2014–2015 | FC Dynamo Saint Petersburg | 28 | (0) |
| 2015 | FC Sakhalin Yuzhno-Sakhalinsk | 15 | (0) |
| 2016–2017 | FC Tekstilshchik Ivanovo | 31 | (1) |
| 2017 | PFC Spartak Nalchik | 17 | (0) |
| 2018 | FC Murom | 9 | (0) |
| 2018 | FC Luki-Energiya Velikiye Luki | 10 | (0) |

International career
| 2005 | Russia U-17 | 8 | (0) |
| 2005 | Russia U-19 | 3 | (0) |
- * Club domestic league appearances and goals as of 11 November 2018

Sergey Nikolayevich Mironov (Russian: Серге́й Николаевич Миронов; born 13 March 1988) is a Russian football defensive midfielder.

== Club career ==
=== Zenit ===
Mironov started playing football at the age of eleven in his native Novgorod and did not plan to become a pro until his coaches told him he had talent. In 2003, he moved to Saint Petersburg to train in DYuSSh Smena and in 2005 he was accepted into FC Zenit reserves, signing a professional contract with the club. He had a bright start and played 66 games for reserves over three years, scoring once, but after that it was decided that he is not good enough to join the first team.

Before 2008 season he tried to find himself a new club in the two top Russian leagues, namely having a trial with Zvezda Irkutsk, but failed and was loaned to Ykkönen (Finnish second tier) team TP-47. There during two months he played under the guidance of Russian coach Sergey Butenko, and then went on another loan to Bulgarian club OFC Sliven 2000 where he made 3 A PFG appearances.

=== Smena-Zenit ===
After returning to Russia he resumed training with Zenit reserves before their head coach Anatoli Davydov persuaded him to go trial with Vladimir Kazachyonok's FC Smena-Zenit. He signed for Smena-Zenit before 2009 season and was chosen as the young team's captain.

After the end of the season in which the team finished at low 16th place, Zenit implemented another change in the club's structure, resulting in FC Smena-Zenit being dissolved and its functions being passed to DYuSSh Smena-Zenit team of U-18s. Mironov thus had to pursue his career elsewhere.

=== Dinamo Vologda ===
In 2010, he joined another Russian Second Division zone West team Dinamo Vologda alongside his former Smena-Zenit teammates Anton Arsenyev and Oleg Babenkov.

=== JK Kalev Sillamäe ===
In February 2011, Mironov signed a one-year deal with Meistriliiga side JK Kalev Sillamäe, reuniting with coach Vladimir Kazachyonok from FC Smena-Zenit.

=== Dynamo Saint Petersburg ===
He made his Russian Football National League debut for FC Dynamo Saint Petersburg on 6 July 2014 in a game against FC Tom Tomsk.

== International career ==
Mironov was a captain of Russia national youth football team of his age since 2003, also playing for team of 1987-born on occasion. He played his last youth international game for Russia U-19 in 2006.

== Playing style and potential ==
Back in December 2006, Zenit reserves coach Aleksey Strepetov rated Mironov as a talented defensive midfielder, noting his hard work and commitment. He has, however, blamed an overuse in youth international football for slowing down Mironov development, also adding that his limited offensive abilities may be a stumbling block for the footballer to play at the highest level.
