= Oleh =

Oleh may refer to:

- Oleh, Delta
- Common Ukrainian male name, see also Oleg
- A Jew immigrating to Israel (plural of oleh is olim)
- Ole (cantillation)

== See also ==
- Oleg (disambiguation)
