= Anton Arsenyev =

Anton Arsenyev may refer to:

- Anton Arsenyev (basketball), Kazakhstani basketball player who participated in the FIBA Asia Under-18 Championship 2008
- Anton Arsenyev (footballer) (born 1985), Russian footballer
