= Polyarush =

Polyarush or Poliaroush is a gender-neutral Slavic surname. Notable people with the surname include:

- Dmitri Poliaroush (born 1970), Belarusian gymnast
- Oleg Polyarush (born 1977), Ukrainian football player
