= Starykh =

Starykh is a Russian surname. Notable people with the surname include:

- Irina Starykh (born 1987), Russian biathlete
- Oleg Starykh, Russian physicist
