= Maksim Smirnov (footballer, born 2000) =

Russian footballer (born 2000)

Personal information
- Full name: Maksim Aleksandrovich Smirnov
- Date of birth: 14 February 2000 (age 26)
- Place of birth: Saint Petersburg, Russia
- Height: 1.71 m (5 ft 7 in)
- Position: Defender

Youth career
- 2016–2019: Zenit Saint Petersburg

Senior career*
| Years | Team | Apps | (Gls) |
| 2017–2019 | Zenit Saint Petersburg | 0 | (0) |
| 2020 | Gorodeya | 6 | (0) |
| 2021 | Irtysh Omsk | 12 | (0) |
| 2022–2023 | Yadro Saint Petersburg | 18 | (1) |
- * Club domestic league appearances and goals as of 3 June 2023

Maksim Aleksandrovich Smirnov (Russian: Максим Александрович Смирнов; born 14 February 2000) is a Russian professional footballer.
