= Sabirov =

Sabirov or Sobirov (Russian: Сабиров, Собиров) is a masculine surname common in the Asian parts of the former Soviet Union, its feminine counterpart is Sabirova or Sobirova. It may refer to:

- Farkhodbek Sobirov (born 1997), Uzbekistani weightlifter
- Karina Sabirova (born 1998), Russian handballer
- Malika Sobirova (1942–1982), Tajik ballet dancer
- Mukhammat Sabirov (1932–2015), Soviet and Russian engineer and politician
- Oleg Sobirov (born 1981), Uzbekistani footballer
- Parviz Sobirov (born 1980) is a Tajikistani judoka
- Ravshanbek Sabirov, Kyrgyzstani politician
- Rishod Sobirov (born 1986), Uzbekistani judoka
- Shakhzodbek Sabirov (born 1993), Uzbekistani judoka
- Shamil Sabirov (born 1959), Soviet boxer
- Takhir Sabirov (1929–2002), Soviet film director, actor and screenwriter
- Temur Sabirov (1940–1977), Tajikistani physicist and mathematician
- Timur Sabirov (born 1986), Uzbekistani sports administrator
