= Gerasimenko =

Gerasimenko or Herasymenko (Герасименко) is a Ukrainian-language surname. It is a patronymic surname and is derived from the given name Gerasim.

The surname may refer to:

- Aleksei Gerasimenko (born 1970), Russian football player
- Dmitry Gerasimenko (born 1978), Russian businessman
- Oleg Gerasimenko (born 1990), Russian footballer
- Svetlana Gerasimenko (1945–2025), Ukrainian-born Soviet and Tajikistani astronomer
- Lina Herasymenko (born 1974), Ukrainian archer
- Vasyl Herasymenko (1900–1961), Soviet-Ukrainian general

== See also ==
- 3945 Gerasimenko, an asteroid
- 67P/Churyumov–Gerasimenko, the comet visited by the Rosetta spacecraft
