= Andriy Savchenko =

Andriy Savchenko may refer to:

- Andriy Savchenko (ice hockey) (born 1972), Ukrainian ice hockey player
- Andriy Savchenko (footballer) (born 1994), Ukrainian footballer
