= Oleg Yakovlev =

Oleg Yakovlev may refer to:

- Oleg Yakovlev (footballer, born 1970), Russian football player
- Oleg Yakovlev (footballer, born 1997), Russian football player
- Oleg Yakovlev (singer) (1969—2017), Russian singer, former member of group Ivanushki International

== See also ==
- Yakovlev (surname)
