= Alexander Spesivtsev =

Russian serial killer (born 1970)

- Born: Alexander Nikolayevich Spesivtsev; 1 March 1970 (age 56); Kemerovo Oblast, RSFSR, Soviet Union
- Other names: "Novokuznetsk Monster", "Siberian Ripper"
- Penalty: Compulsory medical measures (1992); 10 years of imprisonment (1997); Involuntary commitment to the Kamyshin psychiatric hospital of federal service of completing punishment (1999)

Details
- Victims: Convicted for four murders, 80+ suspected
- Span of crimes: 1991–1996
- Country: Russia
- Date apprehended: October 1996

Alexander Nikolayevich Spesivtsev (Russian: Александр Николаевич Спесивцев, born 1 March 1970) is a Russian serial killer, also known as the Novokuznetsk Monster and the Siberian Ripper, convicted of the killing of four people in Novokuznetsk in 1991 and 1996.

Spesivtsev, with the assistance of his mother Lyudmila, targeted street children and young women across Novokuznetsk by luring them into their apartment, where they would be tortured and killed, and sometimes cannibalized. He confessed at some point to nineteen murders, but later retracted his confession and was convicted of only four. Based on found evidence he is suspected of having committed over 80 murders starting as early as 1991.

== Early life ==
Alexander Nikolayevich Spesivtsev was born on 1 March 1970 and raised in an apartment on Pionerskiy Prospekt in central Novokuznetsk, the largest city in Kemerovo Oblast, RSFSR, Soviet Union. He was underweight at birth but survived, although he was frequently ill afterwards. During childhood, Spesivtsev was considered unsocial, did not have friends, and was bullied while at school. His mother Lyudmila Spesivtseva worked at a nearby school and the prosecutor's office and was very affectionate towards her son. His father was an abusive alcoholic who abandoned the family. Spesivtsev and his mother had a strong, but unusual, relationship, as Lyudmila would regularly show her son photographs of corpses from books about criminal cases at a very young age, and the two shared a bed until Alexander was 12.

Growing up, Spesivtsev showed increasingly sadistic tendencies, and in 1988, met his first girlfriend. Arguments led to her breaking up with him, which Spesivstev did not accept. He kidnapped her and tortured her for a month in his apartment until she died of sepsis. For this, at the age of 18, Spesivstev was assigned to the Oryol Special Psychiatric Hospital.

== Crimes ==
He was discharged in 1991 even though in official databases at the time he was still listed as undergoing treatment. Once out, he began associating with transients and beggars and developed a deep-seated hatred of street children, whom he viewed as a byproduct of Russia's emerging democracy. Spesivstev was likewise particularly embittered by an episode during his commitment at the Oryol Hospital, in which he asked another patient to insert a metal ball into his urethra to make him more virile. This had the opposite effect, causing erectile dysfunction and genital pains.

Alexander and then Lyudmila began to lure victims chosen at random into their apartment, where Alexander would torture and eventually kill them. Unaccompanied street children attending discothèques and playing in construction sites had become commonplace in the impoverished city of Novokuznetsk since the collapse of the Soviet Union, and they became his main target. The bodies of victims would sometimes be cannibalized. Lyudmila would dispose of unwanted remains by throwing them from buckets into the Aba River, late at night.

== Investigation ==
The first evidence of his victims emerged when the gangrenous severed heads, torsos, and arms of unidentifiable children were found washed up on the banks of the River Aba. It was not immediately believed there was a serial killer. It was only after several large groups of unattended children disappeared that a serial mass murderer was suspected to be active in the city.

Otherwise, investigators in the regional Directorate of Internal Affairs suspected that organ smugglers were acting within the city's boundaries. Several criminal gangs from the Caucasus region were active in Novokuznetsk at the time, and police searched the baggage of outward flights. Additionally, several hundred internal troops and police officers were deployed to search for the killer, who at some point was thought to be Oleg Rylkov.

== Arrest and sentencing ==
Spesivtsev's crimes were discovered by chance in October 1996, when plumbers sent to the apartment where he lived with his mother could not get access. They called the police to open the door. Inside they found the dismembered body of a girl in the bathtub, and a severely wounded girl, 14-year-old Olga G. Spesivtsev and his mother Lyudmila were immediately arrested.

Olga G. died soon after of her knife wounds, but before her death she told the investigators that Spesivtsev had killed two of her friends, forcing her to dismember the corpses. She also said that Lyudmila had cooked the victim's flesh for consumption by herself and her son; they had also fed some to their dog and forced the captive girls to eat it.

In June 1996, the police had already found the buried bones of children, identified as belonging to at least 15 victims aged from three to fourteen. After his arrest, these were identified as possible victims of Spesivtsev. He initially confessed to having murdered them, but later retracted his confession. In 1997, he was convicted of the murders of Olga G. and her two friends, but not in relation to any other cases because of insufficient evidence. His mother was sentenced to 13 years in prison for having assisted him.

Spesivtsev is permanently confined in the Kamyshin Regional Hospital.

== See also ==
- List of incidents of cannibalism
- List of Russian serial killers
- List of serial killers by number of victims
