= Oleg Yakovlev (footballer, born 1997) =

Russian footballer

Personal information
- Full name: Oleg Borisovich Yakovlev
- Date of birth: 16 June 1997 (age 29)
- Height: 1.94 m (6 ft 4 1/2 in)
- Position: Defender

Senior career*
| Years | Team | Apps | (Gls) |
| 2015 | FC Dynamo Saint Petersburg | 10 | (0) |
| 2017 | FC Anzhi-Yunior Zelenodolsk | 9 | (0) |
| 2020–2022 | FC Yadro Saint Petersburg (amateur) | | |
| 2022 | FC Yadro Saint Petersburg | 6 | (0) |
| 2023 | FC Elektron Veliky Novgorod | 9 | (0) |
- * Club domestic league appearances and goals as of 3 June 2023

Oleg Borisovich Yakovlev (Russian: Олег Борисович Яковлев; born 16 June 1997) is a Russian football player.

== Club career ==
He made his debut in the Russian Football National League for FC Dynamo Saint Petersburg on 18 March 2015 in a game against FC Baltika Kaliningrad.
