= Oleg Wirth =

Russian serial killer

- Born: Oleg Alexandrovich Wirth; 1967 (age 58–59); Urusha, Amur Oblast, RSFSR
- Convictions: Murder x5 Rape
- Penalty: Life imprisonment

Details
- Victims: 5
- Span of crimes: 2011–2012
- Country: Russia
- State: Amur
- Date apprehended: 2012

Oleg Alexandrovich Wirth (Russian: Олег Александрович Вирт; born 1967) is a Russian serial killer who murdered five acquaintances in his home village of Urusha, two with the help of his girlfriend Tatyana Kuznetsova, between 2011 and 2012. After the former exposed his crimes to the police, he admitted his guilt, was convicted and sentenced to life imprisonment in a special regime colony.

== Early life ==
Oleg Wirth was born in 1967 in Urusha, but records of his upbringings are scarce. He was known as a friendly man who worked as the head of the local housing and communal services department, was married and had an adult son. However, tragedy struck when his son was killed in an accident, and as a result, Oleg began to drink heavily and commit crimes. He was incarcerated for several offenses, including for rape. After serving out his sentence, he returned to Urusha, where he hooked up with 39-year-old Tatyana Kuznetsova, a jobless mother of three who had lost her parental rights due to alcoholism and hooliganistic behavior. The two lived in a small house on the outskirts of the village, and despite their previous convictions, both were well-regarded by fellow villagers.

== Murders ==
On New Year's Eve in 2011, Wirth and three friends (two men and a woman) were drinking alcohol at his house. After passing out for some time, upon waking up, Oleg found that his lighter, a keepsake gifted by his deceased son, was missing. Suspecting that one of his companions had stolen the item, he took out a chisel and killed the man, hitting him several times on the head and chest. The two other guests were awoken by the noise, and, in an unsuccessful attempt to calm down the enraged man, were subsequently killed as well. At first, Oleg threw the bodies into the cellar, but then changed his mind and took them out into the yard, where he covered them with snow and some garbage. In March of the following year, he dug out the remains and reburied them in the cellar.

On 30 June, Wirth and Kuznetsova were again out drinking in the company of a mutual friend. Not long after, the man stole a bottle of alcohol, which had been purchased with Oleg's money. After an argument arose between the two, Wirth took out a knife and stabbed his friend, and instructed Tatyana to do the same, which she did. After making sure that he was dead, the two criminals disposed of the body in the cellar. The next day, Wirth and Kuznetsova were out drinking with another friend, this time in the forest on the outskirts of the village. At some point, the friend started asking questions about the man, who had suddenly vanished two days prior. Fearing that he might get suspicious and report to the police, the duo killed him and hid the body in the bushes.

== Arrest, trial and sentence ==
Fearing that he might kill her as well, Kuznetsova went to the police station and reported Wirth to the police. He was quickly arrested, and confessed to the crimes immediately, leading the authorities to the bodies on September 30. For some time, there had been rumours that his mother, who lived next door to him, had known about the crimes, but this was disproven, as she had been away at the time, and rarely communicated with her son. On the other hand, Kuznetsova's claims of being held hostage by Oleg were doubted by police, as the two had been seen walking the streets of Urusha and she appeared to be unconcerned and didn't attempt to flee from him.

At this trial, Oleg shouted that Tatyana was not to blame, that the investigators had framed him and he hadn't been allowed to speak to a lawyer. Nevertheless, he was found guilty, convicted and sentenced to life imprisonment. When reading out the verdict, the presiding judge noted that Wirth was characterized by police as "an immoral, quick-tempered and prone to illegal activities" type of character. Kuznetsova, who was visibly depressed at trial, received 13 years imprisonment due to her cooperation, and after release, will not be allowed to move away and must report to law enforcement agencies twice a month. Wirth was transferred to a special regime colony, where he remains to this day. He appealed his sentence to the Supreme Court of Russia, but the verdict was upheld on 8 October 2014, effectively finalising his sentence.

== See also ==
- List of Russian serial killers
