= FC Mashuk-KMV Pyatigorsk =

Russian football club

Mashuk-KMV
- Nickname: Mashuki (Mashuk men)
- Founded: 1936
- Ground: Central Stadium, Pyatigorsk
- Capacity: 10,365
- Chairman: Aleksandr Sakhtaridi
- Manager: Artur Sadirov
- League: Russian Second League, Division A, Gold Group
- 2025–26: Second stage: 5th
- Website: fcmashuk.ru
Home colours	Away colours

FC Mashuk-KMV Pyatigorsk (Russian: Кавминводский Фонд ФК «Машук-КМВ») is a Russian football club based in Pyatigorsk.

The club plays in the third-tier Russian Second League.

== History ==
The history of Mashuk-KMV dates back to the 1920s and the team named Dynamo. The team was known under different names:

- Dynamo until 1965
- Mashinostroitel in 1966–1967
- Mashuk in 1968–1993 and 1998–2002
- Energia in 1994–1997
- Mashuk-KMV since 2003

Dynamo played in the Soviet League in its first year in 1936, but would not participate in the national competition again until 1966, when the team was renamed Mashinostroitel. After three seasons the team won promotion to the Class A, Group 2. However, the team, renamed as Mashuk in 1968, were not very successful at that level and played in the Second League from the reform of Soviet football in 1971 to 1990, when they were relegated to the Second League B.

After the dissolution of the USSR, Mashuk played in the Russian Second League in 1992–1993 and in 1995–1997. In 1996 they were able to win promotion back, but after relegation in 1997 Mashuk spent five years at the amateur level. After 2002 season they were promoted to the Second Division, and the runners-up position in 2005 allowed Mashuk-KMV to play in the First Division thanks to the exclusion of two clubs. Mashuk was again relegated to the third level after the 2008 season.

== Current squad ==
As of 11 September 2026, according to the Second League website.

Note: Flags indicate national team as defined under FIFA eligibility rules; some limited exceptions apply. Players may hold more than one non-FIFA nationality.

No.	Pos.	Nation	Player
3	DF	RUS	Ruslan Khagur
4	DF	RUS	Rustam Machilov
5	MF	RUS	Anton Krachkovsky
7	MF	RUS	Sevada Torosyan
8	MF	RUS	Yegor Saygushev
9	FW	RUS	Gadzhi Budunov (on loan from Dynamo Makhachkala)
10	MF	RUS	Rasul Gystarov
11	FW	RUS	Ivan Selemenev
13	FW	RUS	Aleksandr Butenko
14	MF	RUS	Ivan Bastyuk
15	MF	RUS	Radzhab Gusengadzhiyev
17	MF	ARM	Aleksandr Mkrtychyan
18	MF	RUS	Mosaver Khashmatulla

No.	Pos.	Nation	Player
21	MF	RUS	Denis Bogomolov
22	GK	RUS	Oleg Suvorov
23	DF	RUS	Astemir Abazov
26	MF	RUS	Sergey Oganyan
33	FW	RUS	Andrey Domotsev
44	FW	RUS	Yegor Krakhmalev (on loan from Spartak Kostroma)
47	DF	RUS	Rasul Guseynov
51	GK	RUS	Yegor Plotnikov (on loan from Dynamo Moscow)
86	GK	RUS	Vladimir Shaykhutdinov
88	DF	RUS	Zikrula Magomedov
95	DF	RUS	Chingiz Magomadov
96	FW	RUS	Kirill Pomeshkin (on loan from Dynamo Makhachkala)

=== Out on loan ===
Note: Flags indicate national team as defined under FIFA eligibility rules; some limited exceptions apply. Players may hold more than one non-FIFA nationality.

No.	Pos.	Nation	Player
—	FW	RUS	Mukhammad Khalibegov (at Angusht Nazran until 31 December 2026)
