= Oleg Lepik =

Russian-born Estonian footballer

Personal information
- Full name: Oleg Gennadyevich Lepik
- Date of birth: 1 August 1973 (age 53)
- Place of birth: Pechory, Russian SFSR
- Height: 1.76 m (5 ft 9 1/2 in)
- Positions: Midfielder; defender

Youth career
- SDYuSShOR-5 Yunost Kaliningrad

Senior career*
Years	Team	Apps	(Gls)
1992	FC Vest-Yunost Kaliningrad		
1993–1994	FC Vest Kaliningrad	30	(3)
1995–1996	FC Mashinostroitel Pskov	50	(3)
1997–1999	FC Chernomorets Novorossiysk	28	(0)
1999	FC Pskov (amateur)		
2000	FC Pskov	11	(0)
2000	FC Baltika Kaliningrad	4	(0)
2001	FC Levadia Maardu	9	(1)
2001	FC Pärnu Levadia	1	(0)
2001–2002	FC Temp Pechory		
2002–2004	FC BSK Spirovo	51	(0)
2006–2010	JK Narva Trans	141	(2)
- * Club domestic league appearances and goals

Oleg Gennadyevich Lepik (Russian: Олег Геннадьевич Лепик; born 1 August 1973 in Pechory) is a former Russian-born Estonian football player.

== Honours ==
Narva Trans

- Meistriliiga runner-up: 2006
- Meistriliiga bronze: 2008, 2009, 2010
- Estonian Cup runner-up: 2006–07
