= Oleg Tarabanov =

Russian footballer

Personal information
- Full name: Oleg Vladimirovich Tarabanov
- Date of birth: 1 August 1997 (age 29)
- Place of birth: Omsk, Russia
- Height: 1.83 m (6 ft 0 in)
- Position: Midfielder

Senior career*
Years	Team	Apps	(Gls)
2016–2022	FC Irtysh Omsk	76	(3)
- * Club domestic league appearances and goals

Oleg Vladimirovich Tarabanov (Russian: Олег Владимирович Тарабанов; born 1 August 1997) is a Russian former football player.

== Club career ==
He made his debut in the Russian Football National League for FC Irtysh Omsk on 22 August 2020 in a game against FC Spartak-2 Moscow.
