= Oleg Yashin =

Russian ice hockey player

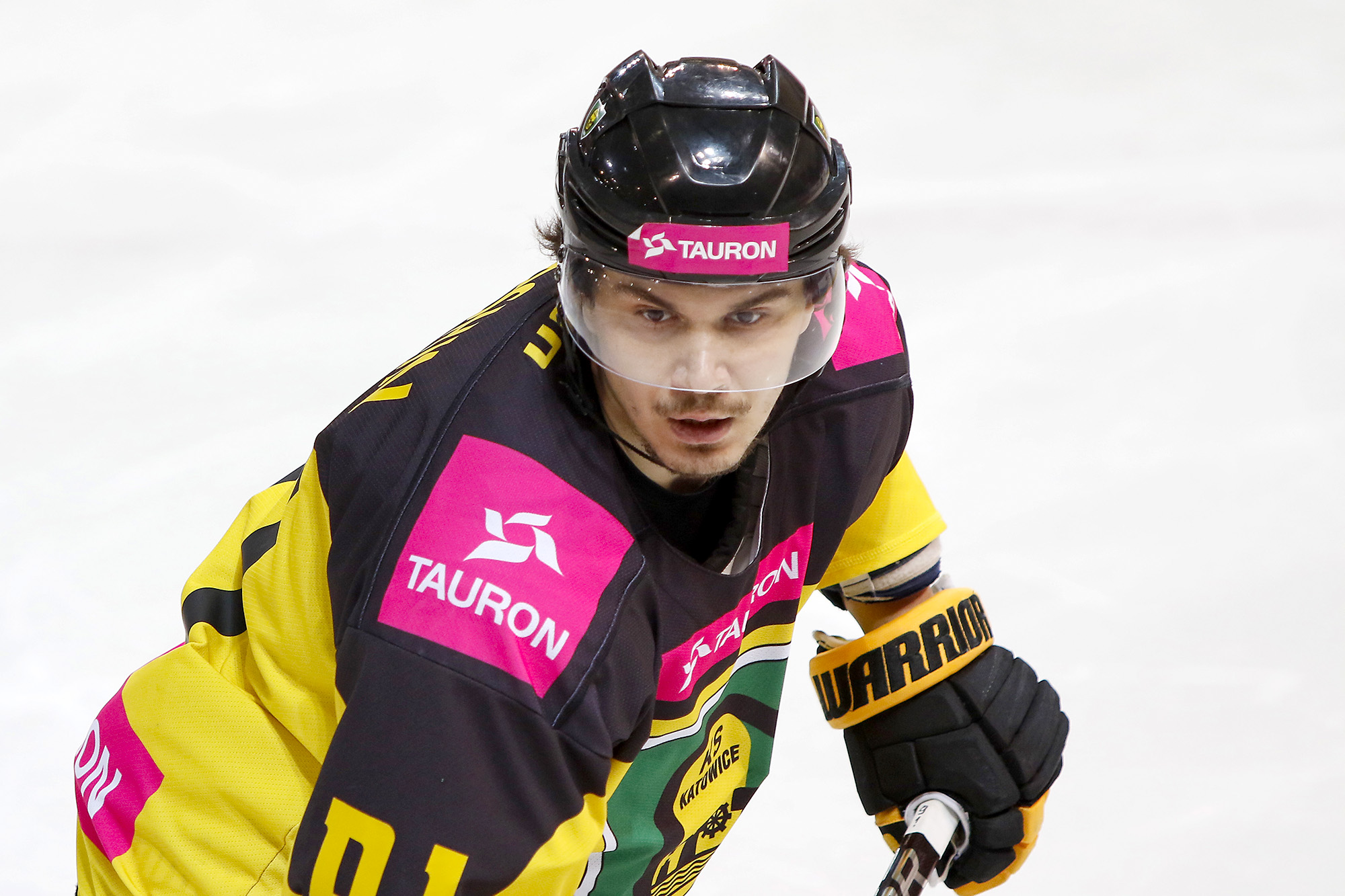
- Born: 3 December 1990 (age 35) Voskresensk, Soviet Union
- Height: 5 ft 10 in (178 cm)
- Weight: 176 lb (80 kg; 12 st 8 lb)
- Position: Left wing
- Shot: Right
- Played for: Atlant Moscow Oblast; Titan Klin; Lokomotiv Yaroslavl; HC Yugra; Kunlun Red Star; Severstal Cherepovets; GKS Katowice; Saryarka Karagandy; HC Tambov
- NHL draft: Undrafted
- Playing career: 2008–2020

Oleg Olegovich Yashin (Russian: Олег Олегович Яшин; born 3 December 1990) is a Russian former professional ice hockey winger.

== Career ==
Yashin most recently played for GKS Katowice of the Polska Hokej Liga. He previously played in the Kontinental Hockey League for Atlant Moscow Oblast, Lokomotiv Yaroslavl, HC Yugra, Kunlun Red Star and Severstal Cherepovets.

== Personal life ==
Yashin's father, Oleg Yashin Sr., was a forward for Khimik Voskresensk and the Fort Wayne Komets.
