= Oleg Lyubelskiy =

Russian footballer

Personal information
- Full name: Oleg Georgiyevich Lyubelskiy
- Date of birth: 12 June 1962
- Place of birth: Rubtsovsk, Russian SFSR
- Date of death: 21 May 1994 (aged 31)
- Place of death: Omsk, Russia
- Height: 1.85 m (6 ft 1 in)
- Position: Goalkeeper

Youth career
- FC Torpedo Rubtsovsk

Senior career*
Years	Team	Apps	(Gls)
1980	FC Torpedo Rubtsovsk	12	(0)
1981–1984	FC Irtysh Omsk	96	(0)
1985	did not play		
1986–1988	FC Irtysh Omsk	54	(0)
1989–1992	FC Uralmash Yekaterinburg	128	(0)
1993	FC Baltika Kaliningrad	4	(0)
- * Club domestic league appearances and goals

Oleg Georgiyevich Lyubelskiy (Russian: Олег Георгиевич Любельский; born 12 June 1962 in Rubtsovsk; died 21 May 1994 in Omsk) was a Russian football player.
