= Oleg Lyashko =

Oleg Lyashko may refer to:

- Oleg Lyashko (swimmer) (born 1982), a swimmer from Uzbekistan
- Oleh Lyashko, the leader of the Radical Party, Ukraine
