= Oleg Kovalyov =

Oleg Kovalyov may refer to:

- Aleh Kavalyow (born 1987), Belarusian footballer
- Oleg Ivanovich Kovalyov (1948–2020), Russian politician, governor of Ryazan Oblast
