= Russian ship Oleg =

At least two ships of the Imperial Russian Navy have been named Oleg.

- Russian frigate Oleg - a 51-gun, wooden frigate accidentally rammed and sunk by the Russian ironclad Kreml in 1869.
- Russian cruiser Oleg - a Bogatyr-class protected cruiser that participated in the Russo-Japanese War and World War I. Sunk by a British motor torpedo boat in 1919 and subsequently scrapped.
