= Oleg Gudymo =

Transnistrian politician (1944–2024)

Oleg Gudymo (Russian: Олег Гудымо; 11 September 1944 – 8 May 2024) was a Transnistrian politician who served as a deputy in the Transnistrian Supreme Council. From 1993 until 2005 he was the First Deputy Minister for National Security. He was a major general of the Transnistrian Ministry of State Security. He was an ethnic Russian. He also became a member of the Joint Control Commission for maintaining peace in the zone of the War of Transnistria on 28 December 1992. In December 2005 Gudymo was elected to the Transnistrian parliament and became chairman of the parliamentarian security committee. In April 2007 the Committee for Security, Defense and Peacekeeping merged with the Committee for Law-enforcement Agencies, combating Corruption, Protection of Rights and Freedoms of Citizens, and Gudymo neither became chairman nor a member of the new committee.

Gudymo was the founder and leader of the political party People's Will which advocates independent statehood and international recognition for Transnistria.

In June 2015 Gudymo was deported from Moldova to Russia.

Gudymo died on 8 May 2024, at the age of 79.
