= Urusha =

Urban locality in Skovorodinsky District of Amur Oblast, Russia

Coordinates: 54°03′N 122°53′E

Urusha (Russian: Уруша) is an urban locality (a work settlement) in Skovorodinsky District of Amur Oblast, Russia. Population: 3,777 (2010 census); 4,422 (2002 census); 4,929 (1989 Soviet census).
