= Oleg Grachev =

Russian ice hockey player

- Born: August 6, 1974 (age 50); Kazan, Russian SFSR, Soviet Union
- Height: 5 ft 10 in (178 cm)
- Weight: 172 lb (78 kg; 12 st 4 lb)
- Position: goaltender
- Shot: Left
- Played for: TAN Kazan; Neftekhimik Nizhnekamsk; Ak Bars Kazan; Neftyanik Almetyevsk; Khimik Voskresensk; HK Gomel; Avangard Omsk; Mechel Chelyabinsk; Neftyanik Leninogorsk; Barys Astana; Khimik-SKA Novopolotsk; Ariada-Akpars Volzhsk
- National team: Russia
- Playing career: 1992–2008

Oleg Grachev (born August 6, 1974) is a Russian former professional ice hockey goaltender. He is a two-time Russian Champion.

== Awards and honors ==
Award	Year
Russian Superleague
Winner (Ak Bars Kazan)	1998
Winner (Avangard Omsk)	2004
