= Oleg Dmitriyev =

Oleg Dmitriyev may refer to:

- Oleg Dmitriyev (footballer, born 1973), Russian football player
- Oleg Dmitriyev (footballer, born 1995), Russian football player
