= Oleg Vasiliev =

Oleg Vasiliev or Vassiliev may refer to:

- Oleg Vasiliev (figure skater) (born 1959), Soviet/Russian figure skater
- Oleg Vassiliev (painter) (1931–2013), Russian painter
