= Oleg Parada =

Russian footballer

Personal information
- Date of birth: 5 February 1969 (age 57)
- Position: Forward

Senior career*
Years	Team	Apps	(Gls)
1986–1988	FC Tsement Novorossiysk	63	(1)
1991	FC Tsement Novorossiysk	0	(0)
1992	FC Niva Slavyansk-na-Kubani	33	(5)
1992	FC Kuban Krasnodar	1	(0)
1993	FC Atommash Volgodonsk	14	(2)
1995	FC Niva Slavyansk-na-Kubani	26	(4)
1996	FC Vityaz Krymsk (amateur)		
- * Club domestic league appearances and goals

Oleg Parada (Russian: Олег Парада; born 5 February 1969) is a former Russian football player who played for various professional and amateur clubs.
