= Helgi Tómasson =

Helgi Tómasson may refer to:

- Helgi Tómasson (dancer) (born 1942), Icelandic ballet dancer and choreographer
- Helgi Tómasson (physician) (1896–1958), Icelandic physician
