= Oleg Tamarin =

Russian composer

Oleg Tamarin (1937–2005) was a Russian composer and violinist. He was born in Moscow, U.S.S.R.

== Life ==
Little is known about Oleg Tamarin's life. Born into the second revolution of 1928, his music was reportedly censored by the regime of Joseph Stalin for having characteristics that were considered to be against the preferred socialist realist style of the time. Although the Association for Contemporary Music did not acknowledge his early contributions, Dmitri Shostakovich, Association of Contemporary Musicians, Prokofiev and Khachaturian may have expressed early interest in the composer.
