= Oleg Lebedev =

Oleg Lebedev may refer to:

- Oleg Lebedev (basketball) (born 1971), Russian basketball player
- Oleg Lebedev (politician, born 1964), Russian politician
- Oleg Lebedev (politician, born 1976), Russian politician
