= Oleg Rudnov =

Russian businessman (1948–2015)

Oleg Rudnov

Oleg Konstantinovich Rudnov (18 November 1948 – 9 January 2015) was a Russian businessman and the chairman of the Baltic Media Group (BMG) (Russian: Балтийская Медиа Группа (БМГ)) which was established in 2003. Since his death, the company has been owned by his son Sergei. He has been described as a close ally of president Vladimir Putin. As well as Baltic Media Group, he was the owner of Bank Rossiya with Yury Kovalchuk and the Sellgren estate near to Vyborg.
