= Oleg Garapuchik =

Belarusian footballer

Personal information
- Date of birth: 29 May 1997 (age 29)
- Place of birth: Luninets, Brest Oblast, Belarus
- Position: Midfielder

Youth career
- 2012–2016: Shakhtyor Soligorsk

Senior career*
Years	Team	Apps	(Gls)
2016–2018	Shakhtyor Soligorsk	0	(0)
2016	→ Granit Mikashevichi (loan)	4	(0)
2017	→ Baranovichi (loan)	24	(0)
2018	→ Volna Pinsk (loan)	19	(0)
2019	UAS Zhitkovichi	7	(0)
2020	Baranovichi	1	(0)
2021–	Luninets	9	(2)

International career
2013	Belarus U17	3	(0)
- * Club domestic league appearances and goals as of 31 December 2022

Oleg Garapuchik (Belarusian: Алег Гарапучык; Russian: Олег Гарапучик; born 29 May 1997) is a Belarusian professional footballer.
