= Oleg Samorukov =

Russian footballer and coach

Personal information
- Full name: Oleg Nikolayevich Samorukov
- Date of birth: 22 October 1972 (age 54)
- Height: 1.79 m (5 ft 10 1/2 in)
- Position: Goalkeeper

Team information
- Current team: FC Volga Tver (asst manager)

Senior career*
Years	Team	Apps	(Gls)
1990–1992	FC Torpedo Ryazan	10	(0)
1996–1998	FC Torgmash Lyubertsy	67	(0)
1998–2009	FC Ryazan	326	(0)

Managerial career
- 2006–2008: FC Reutov (assistant)
- 2007: FC Reutov (administrator)
- 2009: FC Spartak Shchyolkovo
- 2010: FC Istra (assistant)
- 2013–2014: FC Podolye Podolsky district (assistant)
- 2014–2016: FC Yakutiya Yakutsk (assistant)
- 2017–: FC Volga Tver (assistant)
- * Club domestic league appearances and goals

Oleg Nikolayevich Samorukov (Russian: Олег Николаевич Саморуков; born 22 October 1972) is a Russian professional football coach and a former player who works as an assistant coach with FC Volga Tver.

== Club career ==
As a player, he made his debut in the Soviet Second League in 1990 for FC Torpedo Ryazan. He made his Russian Football National League debut for Torpedo Ryazan on 30 May 1992 in a game against FC Sokol Saratov.
