= Oleg Syomin =

Russian footballer

Personal information
- Full name: Oleg Anatolyevich Syomin
- Date of birth: 15 December 1974 (age 51)
- Height: 1.78 m (5 ft 10 in)
- Positions: Midfielder; forward

Senior career*
Years	Team	Apps	(Gls)
1993–1994	FC Bulat Cherepovets	12	(3)
1995–1996	FC Lada Togliatti	2	(0)
1996	FC Lada Dimitrovgrad	25	(2)
1997–1998	FC Lada-Togliatti-VAZ Togliatti	59	(2)
1999	FC Krylia Sovetov Samara	26	(1)
2000	FC Lokomotiv Nizhny Novgorod	14	(0)
2000	FC Anzhi Makhachkala	2	(0)
2001	FC Metallurg Lipetsk	10	(1)
2001	FC Lokomotiv Nizhny Novgorod	8	(0)
2002	FC Lukoil Chelyabinsk	6	(0)
2004	FC Dynamo Kirov	13	(0)
2005	FC Gazovik Orenburg	24	(0)
- * Club domestic league appearances and goals

Oleg Anatolyevich Syomin (Russian: Олег Анатольевич Сёмин; born 15 December 1974) is a former Russian professional footballer.

== Club career ==
He made his professional debut in the Russian Second Division in 1993 for FC Bulat Cherepovets.

== Honours ==
- Russian Cup finalist: 2001 (played in the early stages of the 2000–01 tournament for FC Anzhi Makhachkala).
