= Oleg Zhivetin =

Russian painter (born 1964)

- Born: 1964 (age 61–62)
- Education: Surikov Art Institute

Oleg Zhivetin (born 18 March 1964) is a Russian painter born in Tashkent (now the capital of Uzbekistan).

At the Surikov Art Institute of Moscow Zhivetin earned a bachelor's degree in Fine Art in 1988, and a Master of Fine Arts degree in Painting and Monumental Art in 1990.

His paintings include a number of public art monuments on display in Russian cities. After a Californian art dealer expressed interest in his work, Zhivetin came to the United States and soon secured a solo show at the Mission San Juan Capistrano museum, and came to be represented by the Rosovsky Gallery in Laguna Beach, California. His work has appeared in Southwest Art and in other visual-art periodicals.
