= Oleg Shcherbakov =

Russian association football player

Personal information
- Full name: Oleg Vasilyevich Shcherbakov
- Date of birth: 18 June 1966 (age 60)
- Height: 1.81 m (5 ft 11 1/2 in)
- Position: Forward

Youth career
- FC Fakel Voronezh

Senior career*
Years	Team	Apps	(Gls)
1986	FC Atom Novovoronezhsky		
1987	FC Khimik Dzerzhinsk	10	(3)
1988	FC Fakel Voronezh	14	(4)
1988	FC Khimik Dzerzhinsk	14	(3)
1989	FC Metallurg Lipetsk	10	(3)
1989	FC Fakel Voronezh	1	(0)
1992	FC Okean Kerch	15	(5)
1992–1993	FC Fakel Voronezh	13	(0)
1993–1996	SpVg Frechen 20		
1997	FC Rassvet Troitskoye	23	(9)
- * Club domestic league appearances and goals

Oleg Vasilyevich Shcherbakov (Russian: Олег Васильевич Щербаков; born 18 June 1966) is a former Russian football player.
