= Savchenkov =

Savchenkov (feminine Savchenkova) is an East Slavic family name. It may refer to:

- Alexander Savchenkov, Russian ice hockey player
- Anton Sergeyevich Savchenkov, Russian football player
- Sergei Savchenkov, Russian professional football coach and a former player
