= Oleg Belakovsky =

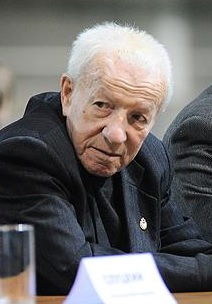
Oleg Belakovsky at PFC CSKA Moscow fans meeting, 2010

Oleg (Samuil) Markovich Belakovsky (Russian: Оле́г (Самуи́л) Ма́ркович Белако́вский; September 6, 1921, Yelisavetgrad, Ukrainian SSR, Soviet Union — July 19, 2015, Moscow) was a Soviet sports doctor, Honored Doctor of the Russian Federation, Colonel of Medical Service in retired.

== Biography ==
Since 1955, directly involved in the training of medical support national top athletes and teams CSKA in various sports competitions to the charge. Is engaged to work with the national teams of the USSR and the Russian football and hockey, is a doctor of the USSR team in football - Olympic champion Melbourne (1956) and hockey — the champion of the Olympic Winter Games in Sapporo (1972), Innsbruck (1976), on the other responsible competitions (World and European championships in football and hockey, the first meeting with Canadian professionals in 1972 and 1974). As a physician Soviet national hockey team was repeatedly awarded with gold, silver and bronze medals at the World and European Championships.

Belakovsky is one of the authors of the introduction of the practice of medical support army sportsmen Brigadier method of medical examinations, a comprehensive approach to the restoration of the sick and injured athletes. They proposed a number of methods for determining the functional state of athletes, effective in practical activities medical teams.

Students whom Belakovsky currently run by the medical service of CSKA, are doctors of Russian national teams in various sports.
