= Oleg Kroshkin =

Belarusian artist (1950–2020)

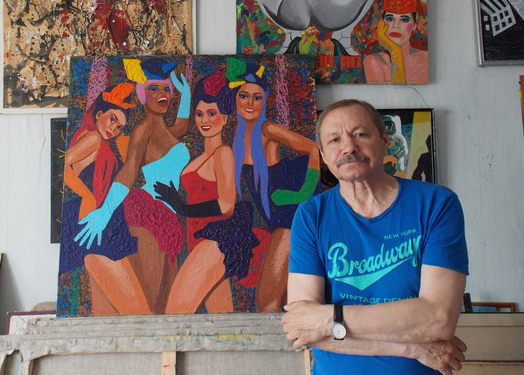
- Oleg Kroshkin, 2002
- Born: 14 February 1950; Sokol-Dolinsky village, Russia
- Died: 7 November 2020 (aged 69); Vitebsk, Belarus
- Known for: Painter
- Movement: Pop Art

Oleg Kroshkin (Russian: Олег Крошкин; 1950 - 2020) was a contemporary Belarusian artist. He was among the most iconic representatives of the modern Vitebsk art school.

== Biography ==
Born in 1950 in Sokol-Dolinsky village in Russia, Kroshkin died in the city of Vitebsk, Belarus, 7 November 2020. Kroshkin graduated from the art and graphic department of the Vitebsk State Art Institute in 1972. He regularly exhibited his works since 1971.

Kroshkin was a member of the Union of Artists of the USSR, and from 1991, a member of the Belarusian Union of Artists. His works were characterized by appeals to pop art and urban folklore, bright colors, the incorporation of collage, and ironic use of images. In his works Kroshkin relied on postmodern thought, anti-traditionalism, written quotation, and the use of various artistic languages and techniques.

== Artistry ==
Oleg Kroshkin was associated with the second school of Vitebsk, along with Marc Chagall, Chaïm Soutine, Michel Kikoine, Pinchus Kremegne, Ossip Zadkine, Jacques Lipchitz, and Ossip Lubitch, who were all from Belarus. His works were displayed in Tretyakov Gallery, New Brunswick, New Jersey, New York City, and Cologne museums, and were in high demand among international collectors.

He listened to pop, rap, and jazz music; some of his works were completed on sketch papers, and some incorporated current newspapers.

His was known as amusing and creative, but struggled with self-loathing which was exacerbated by the death of his brother. After this, he lost interest in painting and declined creatively until his death in October 2020.

Kroshkin's works demonstrated sarcasm, love, family, sex, religion and oppression, which he considered extremely important.

== Museums ==
- Belarusian National Arts Museum (Minsk, Belarus)
- Marc Chagall Museum (Vitebsk, Belarus)
- Tretyakov Gallery (Russia)
- New Brunswick Museum (USA)
- Museum of Modern Art (Frankfurt)
- The funds of the Belarusian Union of Artists

== Exhibitions ==
=== Group exhibitions ===
- 1988 – international exhibition, Kaunas (Lithuanian SSR)
- 1991 – international exhibition «The Artists from Malevich and Chagall’s Motherland», (Poland).
- 1992 – republican exhibition (Literary Museum of М. Bogdanovich), Minsk.
- 1997 – international exhibition «Vitebsk Watercolours», Wetzlar (Germany).
- 2003 – international open-air «PANODERAMA», Frankfurt on the Oder (Germany).
- 2014 – international exhibition «Poetry of Colour», Moscow (Russia)

=== Personal exhibitions ===
- 1995 – an exhibition of watercolors (Vitebsk Art Museum), Vitebsk.
- 2005 – personal exhibition «Painting, graphics, collage» (exhibition hall of the CE «Museum «Vitebsk Centre of Modern Art»), Vitebsk (60 works).
- 2008 – an exhibition of Vitebsk artists «From Marc Chagall’s to Our Time».
- 2010 – exhibition «ART-season-2010» (exhibition hall of the CE «Museum «Vitebsk Centre of Modern Art»), Vitebsk.
- 2012 – exhibition of works exhibition of the works «Fine Gift, Invaluable Gift», granted to Vitebsk Art Museum (Vitebsk Art Museum), Vitebsk.
- 2014 – personal exhibition «Cherchez la femme» (M. Chagall Art Centre), Vitebsk (37 works).
- 2016 – personal exhibition «Music of Colour» (concert hall «Vitebsk»), Vitebsk.
- 2017 – exhibition «ABSTRAKT» (exhibition hall of the CE «Museum «Vitebsk Centre of Modern Art»), Vitebsk.
