= Oleg Suvorov =

Russian footballer

Personal information
- Full name: Oleg Vyacheslavovich Suvorov
- Date of birth: 23 February 1997 (age 29)
- Place of birth: Stavropol, Russia
- Height: 1.93 m (6 ft 4 in)
- Position: Goalkeeper

Team information
- Current team: FC Mashuk-KMV Pyatigorsk
- Number: 22

Senior career*
Years	Team	Apps	(Gls)
2012	FC SevKavGTU Stavropol		
2016	FC Dynamo Stavropol	9	(0)
2017	FC Zenit Penza	20	(0)
2018	FC Syzran-2003	8	(0)
2018–2019	FC Fakel Voronezh	1	(0)
2020–2021	FC Kyzyltash Bakhchisaray		
2021–2023	FC Biolog-Novokubansk	78	(0)
2023–	FC Mashuk-KMV Pyatigorsk	52	(0)
- * Club domestic league appearances and goals as of 15 November 2026

Oleg Vyacheslavovich Suvorov (Russian: Олег Вячеславович Суворов; born 23 February 1997) is a Russian football player who plays for FC Mashuk-KMV Pyatigorsk.

== Club career ==
He made his debut in the Russian Professional Football League for FC Dynamo Stavropol on 17 September 2016 in a game against FC Armavir.

He made his Russian Football National League debut for FC Fakel Voronezh on 12 August 2018 in a game against FC Sibir Novosibirsk.
