= Oleg Tolbanov =

Russian physicist

Oleg P. Tolbanov
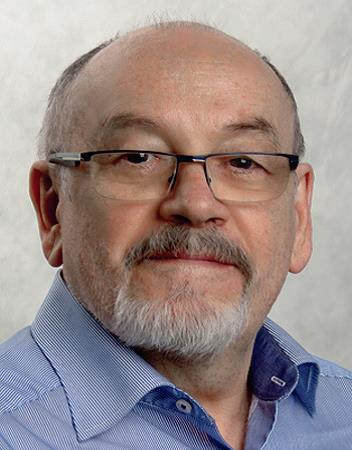
- Born: 3 February 1947 (age 79)
- Citizenship: Russia
- Education: Tomsk Institute of Radio Electronics and Electronic Engineering
- Scientific career
- Fields: Solid state physics Solid-state electronics Power pulse electronics
- Workplaces: Tomsk State University

Oleg Petrovich Tolbanov (born 3 February 1947 in Tomsk, USSR) is a Russian physicist, specialist in solid state physics, solid-state electronics and physical materials science. He is the author of more than 160 scientific articles in the Web of Science database (Hirsch Index - 15), including: monographs, 5 textbooks, more than 60 inventions.

== Early life ==
On 3 February 1947, Tolbanov was born in Tomsk, USSR.

== Education ==
Tolbanov graduated from school in 1965 and entered Tomsk Institute of Radio Electronics and Electronic Engineering.

== Career ==
In 1966, Tolbanov was a member of the avant-garde brigade of the Tomsk student construction team participated in clearing the site for construction of the capital of oil industry, the city of Strezhevoy (Tomsk region).

- From 1970 to 1974 Oleg P. Tolbanov worked at the Research Institute of Semiconductor Devices (Tomsk), rising from an engineer to a leading designer.
- From 1975 to the present time Oleg P. Tolbanov works at Tomsk State University. Under his leadership, the Scientific school and Laboratory of Functional Electronics were established, in which work is carried out related to the study of patterns, development of semiconductor doping technology with impurities with deep energy levels and building of structures and devices based on it.
- In 2016, thanks to the developed detectors, they entered the ATLAS experiment group, which is searching for super-heavy elementary particles, such as the Higgs Boson, at the European Center for Nuclear Research (CERN).

Previously unknown scientific facts were discovered: – marginal compensation of GaAs with chromium impurity, which makes it possible to achieve a specific resistance of more than 1 GΩ * cm (higher than in its own semiconductor); – corrugation of the energy bands, leading to formation of recombination barriers, allowing a more than 100-fold increase in the lifetime of charge carriers in a compensated semiconductor.

Tolbanov is the head of Laboratory of Functional Electronics at Institute of Smart Materials and Technology.

== Personal life ==
Tolbanov is married and has two daughters, Anna and Lyudmila.

== Selected monographs, articles and publications ==
- Monography “Semiconductor devices based on gallium arsenide with deep centers”, 2016, Page 258, ISBN 978-5-94621-556-5.
- The Mechanism of Superfast Switching of Avalanche S-Diodes Based on GaAs Doped With Cr and Fe / Prudaev I., Oleinik V., Smirnova T. et al. // IEEE TRANSACTIONS ON ELECTRON DEVICES Volume: 65 Issue: 8 Pages.: 3339–3344, 2018.
- Photon counting microstrip X-ray detectors with GaAs sensors / Ruat M., Andra M., Bergamaschi A., et al. // JOURNAL OF INSTRUMENTATION Volume: 13 Article: C01046, 2018.
- Characterisation of GaAs:Cr pixel sensors coupled to Timepix chips in view of synchrotron applications / Ponchut, C.; Cotte, M.; Lozinskaya, A., et al. // JOURNAL OF INSTRUMENTATION Volume: 12 Article: C12023, 2017.
- Semiconductor materials for x-ray detectors / Pennicard D., Pirard B., Tolbanov O., et al. // MRS BULLETIN Том: 42 Выпуск: 6 Стр.: 445—450 Опубликовано: JUN 2017 5. MHz rate X-Ray imaging with GaAs:Cr sensors using the LPD detector system / Veale M., Booker P., Cline B., et al. // JOURNAL OF INSTRUMENTATION, 2017 .
- Performance of a Medipix3RX Spectroscopic Pixel Detector With a High Resistivity Gallium Arsenide Sensor / Hamann E., Koenig T., Zuber M., et al. // IEEE TRANSACTIONS ON MEDICAL IMAGING: 707–715, 2015 .
- Investigation of GaAs:Cr Timepix assemblies under high flux irradiation / Hamann E., Koenig T., Zuber M., et al. // JOURNAL OF INSTRUMENTATION, 2015 .
- The LAMBDA photon-counting pixel detector and high-Z sensor development / Pennicard D., Smoljanin S., Struth B., et al. // JOURNAL OF INSTRUMENTATION, 2014 .
