= Oleg Cassini, Inc. =

American fashion house founded by American fashion designer Oleg Cassini

- Company type: Private
- Industry: Fashion
- Founded: 1951
- Founder: Oleg Cassini
- Headquarters: Oyster Bay Cove, New York, United States
- Area served: Worldwide
- Products: Haute couture, perfume, wedding dresses, accessories, men's fashion
- Website: www.olegcassini.com

Oleg Cassini, Inc. is an American fashion house founded by American fashion designer Oleg Cassini. The company is based in Oyster Bay Cove, New York, and was established in 1951.
