= Oleg Murayenko =

Executed Kazakh serial killer

- Born: Oleg Vasilyevich Murayenko; 1973; Petropavl, Kazakh SSR
- Died: 2002 (aged 28–29); Kazakhstan
- Cause of death: Execution by shooting
- Conviction: Murder x6
- Penalty: Death

Details
- Victims: 7
- Span of crimes: 1998; March – November 2000
- Country: Kazakhstan
- State: North Kazakhstan
- Date apprehended: November 2000

Oleg Vasilyevich Murayenko (Russian: Олег Васильевич Мураенко; 1973 – 2002) was a Kazakhstani serial killer responsible for the murders of six women in Petropavl between March and November 2000, after being erroneously released from prison after killing an inmate in 1998. Following a lengthy investigation and his capture with the use of fingerprints, he was convicted, sentenced to death and executed in 2002.

== Biography ==
Little is known about Murayenko's background. Born in 1973 in Petropavl, he was popular with girls and women from the town, whom described him as a tall and handsome man, akin to a Kazakh Alain Delon. Despite this, Murayenko was first prosecuted at the age of 17, and by the time he reached 25, he had amassed three convictions for robbery and theft. While serving his latest sentence at a prison colony in Novoukrainka, Aiyrtau District, he joined a prison gang called the "Council of Law and Order". On the night of November 19 to 20, 1998, Murayenko, together with several other members, attacked a group of inmates who had refused to join their gang, beating one of them to death and leaving the other three with fractured ribs, tibias and damaged internal organs. A criminal investigation was initiated into the incident, but due to poor management and little cooperation with the prosecutor's office, the case was closed after two years with no indictments. In the meantime, on May 20, 1999, Murayenko had already been released from prison and returned to Petropavl, where not long after he began his murder spree.

On March 13, 2000, at about 2 AM, Murayenko came across a woman returning home after going to the "Master and Margarita" café with some friends. He started strangling her with her own scarf and when he ceased, she fell to the ground, he then put his foot on her neck to ensure that she was dead. After killing her, Murayenko stole her sheepskin coat, tearing off a small strap from it in his haste. Despite this, the officers investigating the crime scene were unable to recover any usable evidence that would indicate who the criminal was, apart from a small partial fingerprint left on the woman's handbag. A month later, in another part of town, another murder occurred. After failing to contact her relatives upon returning home drunk from a party, the body of the second victim was found in her bed, evidently strangled with a leather coat strap. Like with the first victim, her coat had been stolen, and again, since there were no witnesses or physical evidence, investigators were at a lost as to what exactly had transpired on the night of the murder. In his last confession, Murayenko claimed to have met the woman near a dispensary and offered to accompany her home. In her drunken state, she agreed to have him over for some tea.

In the summer months, Murayenko struck again, strangling a prostitute near her home. For this crime, the taxi driver who had dropped her off was briefly considered a suspect but later on provided a credible alibi. Again in the summer, in a dacha outside Petropavl, yet another prostitute was killed, this time with either a knife or axe. According to eyewitness reports, the woman had been seen drinking at various kiosks the night before her death, but no one had seen her with or followed by anybody. By this time, rumors of a maniac attacking women began to spread around the city, causing concern for the local authorities, who by then were still unsure if this was the work of a serial offender or not.

In November, in Petropavl's Cheryomushki micro-district, Murayenko entered a local grocery store, locking the door behind him. After doing so, he jumped over the counter and strangled the cashier. He then sat inside for some time, drinking cognac and eating candy. The day after, in the city center, he broke into another store opposite the police station and killed the cashier, who was about to go do some chores. In both cases, Murayenko was able to slip by unnoticed.

== Arrest, trial and execution ==
Not long after the store murders, retired police officer Talgat Tugunbayev was out walking on the streets when he noticed two intoxicated women and a man entering a local hostel. Acting on instinct, he notified the current head of the police department, Nurgali Urazalinov, asking him to send a squadron to check them just in case. The detectives eventually found the trio having sex in one of the rooms, when a detective noticed one of the girls wearing the same sheepskin coat as one of the murder victims. The trio were taken to the police department, where the girl explained that the coat was given to her by a friend - Oleg Murayenko.

After learning of this, Murayenko was quickly picked up and interrogated. During the interrogation, he gave conflicting accounts on how he came to be in possession of the fur coat, first claiming it was from his nephew and then from his uncle, who had allegedly received it, along with some silverware, from a relative of the deceased woman. In the meantime, Igor Semyonov and Olga Potorocha, heads of the forensic department, compared the partial fingerprint found on the first victim's handbag, and discovered that it was an exact match to Murayenko's. They forwarded the information to the detectives, who in turn told Murayenko. After he was confronted with this information, he finally admitted to the crimes, explaining in detail how he killed them and where. Despite this, when he was brought to trial, he recanted his confession, admitting responsibility solely for the second murder. Prosecutors were able to accurately present their evidence, however, and after a long trial, Murayenko was found guilty and sentenced to death. He was executed in 2002, which was one year before the moratorium on the death penalty was introduced in the country, thus making him the last known prisoner executed in the North Kazakhstan region.

== See also ==
- List of serial killers by country
