= Oleg Prezhdo =

Ukrainian–American physical chemist (born 1970)

Oleg V. Prezhdo
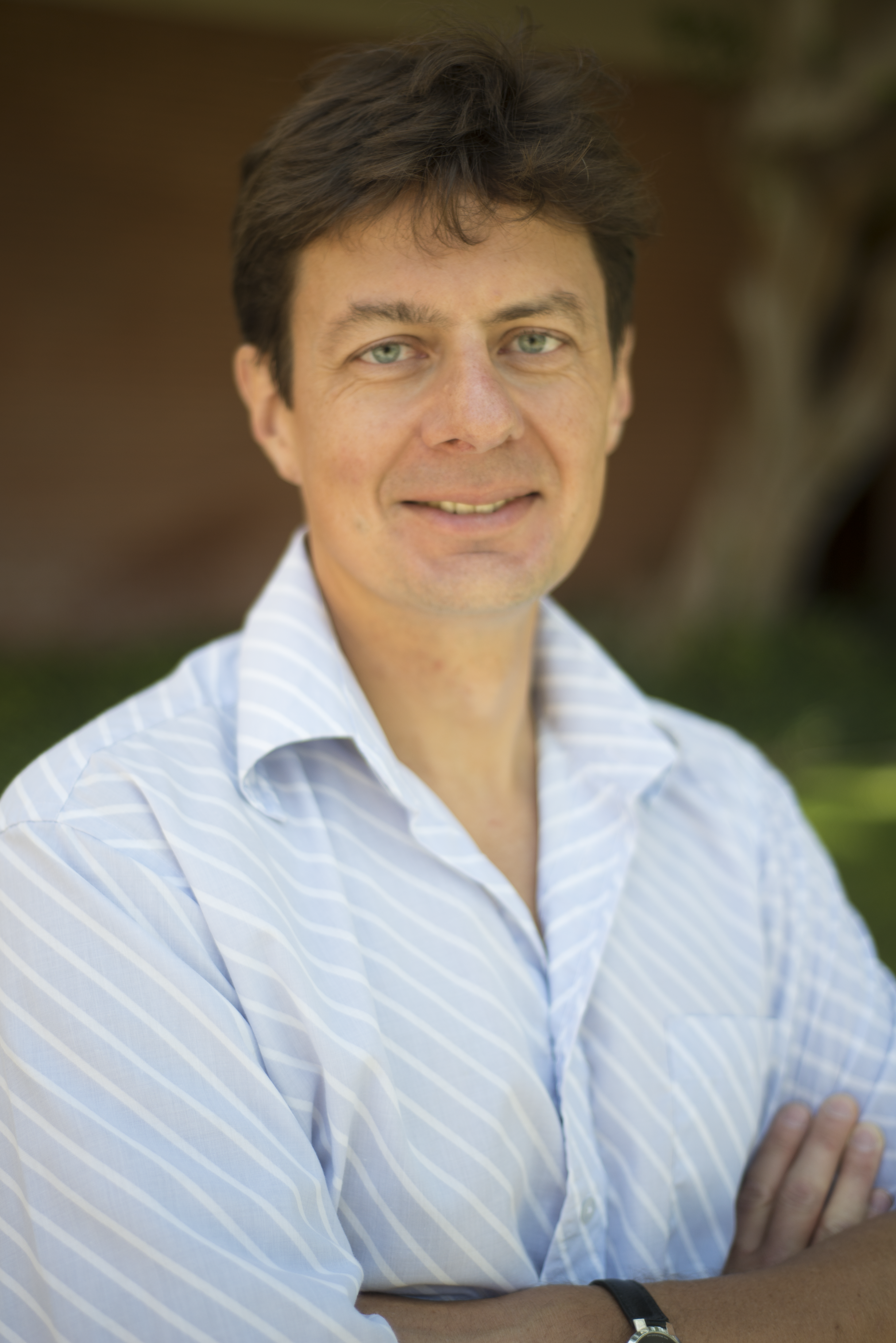
- Born: 1970 (age 55–56)
- Known for: Theoretical methods in Quantum Chemistry

Academic background
- Education: Yale University, UT Austin, Kharkiv National University
- Thesis: Quantum-classical approaches for simulation of non-adiabatic chemical dynamics in solution
- Doctoral advisor: P. J. Rossky

Academic work
- Discipline: Quantum Chemist, Physicist
- Institutions: University of Southern California, University of Rochester, University of Washington

Oleg V. Prezhdo (born 1970) is a Ukrainian–American physical chemist whose research focuses on non-adiabatic molecular dynamics and time-dependent density functional theory (TDDFT). His research interests range from fundamental aspects of semi-classical and quantum-classical physics to excitation dynamics in condensed matter and biological systems. His research group focuses on the development of new theoretical models and computational tools aimed at understanding chemical reactivity and energy transfer at a molecular level in complex condensed phase environment. Since 2014, he is a professor of chemistry and of physics & astronomy at the University of Southern California.

== Education and career ==
Born in Kharkiv, Ukraine, Prezhdo obtained a Diploma in Theoretical Chemistry in 1991 under Anatoly V. Luzanov from the Kharkiv National University. He worked at the Kharkiv Polytechnic Institute for a year under Stanislav A. Tyurin. Prezhdo moved to the United States in 1993 for his graduate studies and received a Ph.D. from the University of Texas at Austin, working under Peter J. Rossky, in 1997. His doctoral research focused on various quantum-classical approaches in non-adiabatic dynamics in solution.

After a postdoctoral fellowship with John Tully at Yale University, he joined the University of Washington in 1998 as an assistant professor in the department of chemistry. In 2003, he became associate professor and then professor of chemistry (2005–10). In 2010, he moved to the University of Rochester, where he served as a professor of chemistry as well as an adjunct professor of physics. In 2014, he moved to the University of Southern California as a professor of chemistry and physics & astronomy.

== Research ==
Prezhdo's group focuses on theory and modeling of non-equilibrium phenomena in condensed phase systems. The research efforts comprise a coherent and unique combination of formal work and large-scale computer simulations, aiming to provide quantitative and qualitative explanations of experimental observations and puzzles and to suggest new experiments.

Fundamental studies span several related areas of quantum, semiclassical and statistical mechanics. Prezhdo explored Lie algebraic structures to couple quantum and classical mechanics. A simple and powerful extension of classical Hamiltonian dynamics, named quantized Hamiltonian dynamics, was developed to include zero-point energy, tunneling, dephasing and other quantum effects into molecular dynamics simulations. A quantum-classical formalism based on the Bohmian interpretation of quantum mechanics was proposed. A broad spectrum of techniques for nonadiabatic molecular dynamics was developed and implemented within real-time time-dependent density functional theory. The techniques include the stochastic mean-field and decoherence induced surface hopping approaches, which incorporate quantum decoherence that drastically change timescales of non-equilibrium processes in condensed phase systems and naturally leads to the widely used surface-hopping concept; coherence penalty functional that deterministically incorporates decoherence into Ehrenfest dynamics; global flux surface hopping that treats accurately super-exchange and many-particle transitions; and Liouville space formulations of surface hopping that treat populations and coherences on equal footing, and describe super-exchange and many-particle transitions. In collaboration, Prezhdo proposed many-body measures of hole-particle distributions, entropy and entanglement for the electronic structure theory and developed a statistical mechanical theory for electro-optic properties of organic photoactive materials.

The advances in non-adiabatic molecular dynamics and time-dependent density functional theory allowed Prezhdo and his group to model quantum dynamics in a broad range of condensed phase and nanoscale materials. Prezhdo pioneered time-dependent modeling of photo-induced electron transfer, relaxation and recombination in dye-sensitized semiconductors that form the basis for Gratzel solar cells, providing a unified description for understanding molecule/bulk, organic/inorganic interfaces. The two components are traditionally described by different scientific communities, chemists, and physicists, often using opposing concepts. Prezhdo studied charge carrier dynamics in semiconductor quantum dots, rationalized the absence of the phonon-bottleneck, and demonstrated a new mechanism of multiple exciton generation. The latter process was compared to singlet fission in molecular crystals. In collaboration with experimentalists, Prezhdo demonstrated the new, Auger-assisted electron transfer mechanism, which is common in nanoscale materials, because they exhibit both significant excitonic interaction and high densities of states. While investigating plasmonic properties of metal nanoparticles, Prezhdo predicted instantaneous photo-induced charge separation that was confirmed experimentally a year later. Prezhdo and co-workers pioneered studies of charge carrier dynamics in hybrid organic-inorganic perovskites that are currently considered the most promising solar cell material. Prezhdo investigated excited state processes in nanoscale carbon materials, including fullerenes, carbon nanotubes and graphene. Subsequently, the work expanded into studies of other 2-dimensional materials such as transition metal dichalcogenides. During his studies of excited state dynamics in condensed matter and nanoscale systems, Prezhdo pays particular attention to realistic aspects of the materials, including defects, dopants, interfaces, grain boundaries, non-stoichiometric composition, etc.

In addition to the main research efforts focusing on theory and simulation of quantum dynamics in the condensed phase, Prezhdo works in a number of other areas. He studied ion transport in nanoscale carbon materials used as electrodes in batteries and supercapacitors. He modeled the effect of confinement on liquid-gas phase transition and critical phenomena, and proposed a protocol for drug delivery inside carbon nanotubes, combining nanotube optical and hydrophobic properties. Prezhdo was the first to demonstrate how graphene nanopores can be used to determine DNA sequence, proposing two complementary detection mechanisms. He investigated ionic liquids and their application to exfoliation of graphene and black phosphorus. Prezhdo proposed a mechanism for retinol isomerization in the dark. He co-developed the most widely used analytic model of the biological catch-bond, derived multiple universal relationships that are used by experimentalists, and made intriguing predictions for new experiments. While investigating atmospheric chemistry, he rationalized the surprising insensitivity of the ozone layer photochemistry to the properties of liquid media (hydrogen-bonding vs. polar vs. non-polar) and explained the large differences of the photochemistry in gas, liquid and solid environments. Using explicitly correlated Gaussian, Prezhdo studied exotic states of matter, modeling electron-phonon dynamics in high-temperature superconductors, and characterizing excited states of positronic atoms to open a new route to experimental verification of stability of positronic systems.

With Alexey Akimov (now at the University of Buffalo, NY), Prezhdo developed the PYXAID program for non-adiabatic molecular dynamics simulations in condensed matter systems. A Python extension for ab initio real-time electron-nuclear dynamics, PYXAID is released under the GNU General Public License. Its main functionality is to study charge and energy transfer and relaxation kinetics in condensed matter and nanoscale materials. PYXIAD can handle systems composed of several hundreds of atoms and involving thousands of electronic states. The source code and majority of the work for PYXAID was done by Akimov, then a post-doc in his group.

Prezhdo has co-authored more than 350 publications.

== Awards and societies ==
In 2008, he was elected Fellow of the American Physical Society for the "development of novel methodology for quantum mechanical dynamics with applications to elucidate chemical behavior in complex systems". His other awards and fellowships include New Faculty Award from The Camille and Henry Dreyfus Foundation (1998), Research Innovation Award from Research Corporation (1999), an Alfred P. Sloan Fellowship (2001), CAREER Award of the National Science Foundation (2001), Fellowship of the Japanese Society for the Promotion of Science, Kyoto University (2007), Promising Scientist Prize from the Centre de Mécanique Ondulatoire Appliquée, Kanazawa, Japan (2011), and the Friedrich Wilhelm Bessel Research Award of the Humboldt Foundation (2015).

As of 2018, he serves as an editor for the Journal of Physical Chemistry Letters (since 2011) and Surface Science Reports (since 2012); he was an editor of the Journal of Physical Chemistry (from 2008). He has held invited professorships and visiting positions in University of Évry Val d'Essonne, Paris, France (2004), Max Planck Institute for the Physics of Complex Systems, Dresden, Germany (2005–06), Kyoto University (2007), Université Paris Est (2011), Kharkiv National University, Ukraine (2014), Beijing Normal University (2016–17) as well as Donostia International Physics Center, San Sebastian, Spain (2016–17).

== Selected publications ==
- D. Liu, B. Wang, Y. Wu, A. S. Vasenko, O. V. Prezhdo, “Breaking the size limitation of nonadiabatic molecular dynamics in condensed matter systems with local descriptor machine learning”, PNAS, 121, 36, e2403497121 (2024).
- W. Li, Y. She, A. S. Vasenko, O. V. Prezhdo, “Ab initio nonadiabatic molecular dynamics of charge carriers in metal halide perovskites”, Nanoscale, 13, 10239 (2021).
- J. Jankowska, R. Long, O. V. Prezhdo, “Quantum dynamics of photogenerated charge carriers in hybrid perovskites: dopants, grain boundaries, electric order, and other realistic aspects”, ACS Energ. Lett., 2, 1588 (2017).
- A. A. Chistyakov, M. A. Zvaigzne, V. R. Nikitenko, A. R. Tameev, I. L. Martynov, O. V. Prezhdo, “Optoelectronic properties of semiconductor quantum dot solids for photovoltaic applications”, J. Phys. Chem. Lett., 8, 4129 (2017).
- R. Long, O. V. Prezhdo, W. H. Fang, “Nonadiabatic charge dynamics in novel solar cell materials”, Wiley Interdiscip. Rev. Comput. Mol. Sci., 7, e1305 (2017).
- L.-J. Wang, A. Akimov, O. V. Prezhdo, “Recent progress in surface hopping: 2011-2015”, J. Phys. Chem. Lett., 7, 2100 (2016).
- A. V. Akimov, O. V. Prezhdo, “Large-scale computations in chemistry: a bird's eye view of a vibrant field”, Chem. Rev., 115, 5797 (2015).
- L. J. Wang, R. Long. O. V. Prezhdo, “Time-domain ab initio modeling of photoinduced dynamics at nanoscale interfaces”, Annu. Rev. Phys. Chem., 66, 549 (2015).
- L. J. Wang, O. V. Prezhdo, D. Beljonne, “Mixed quantum-classical dynamics for charge transport in organics”, Phys. Chem. Chem. Phys., 17, 12395 (2015)
- A. V. Akimov, A. J. Neukirch, O. V. Prezhdo, “Theoretical insights into photoinduced charge transfer and catalysis at metal oxide surfaces”, Chem. Rev., 113, 4496 (2013).
- V. V. Chaban, O. V. Prezhdo, “Ionic and molecular liquids: hand in hand for robust engineering”, J. Phys. Chem. Lett., 4, 1423 (2013).
- H. M. Jaeger, K. Hyeon-Deuk, O. V. Prezhdo, “Exciton multiplication from first principles”, Acc. Chem. Res., 46, 1280 (2013).
- S. A. Fischer, C. M. Isborn, O. V. Prezhdo, “Excited states and optical absorption of small semiconducting clusters: dopants, defects and charging”, Chem. Science, 2, 400 (2011).
- S. Garaschuk, V. Rassolov and O. V. Prezhdo, “Semiclassical Bohmian dynamics”, Rev. Comp. Chem., 87, 287 (2011).
- O. V. Prezhdo, “Photoinduced dynamics in semiconductor quantum-dots: insights from time-domain ab initio studies”, Acc. Chem. Res., 42, 2005 (2009)
- O. V. Prezhdo, Y. V. Pereverzev, “Theoretical aspects of the biological catch-bond”, Acc. Chem. Res., 42, 693 (2009).
- O. V. Prezhdo, “Multiple excitons and electron-phonon bottleneck in semiconductor quantum dots: Insights from ab initio studies”, Chem. Phys. Lett. – Frontier Article, 460, 1 (2008); Journal Cover.
- W. R. Duncan, O. V. Prezhdo, “Theoretical studies of photoinduced electron transfer in dye-sensitized TiO2”, Annu. Rev. Phys. Chem., 58, 143 (2007).
- O. V. Prezhdo, “Quantized Hamilton dynamics”, Perspective Article, Theor. Chem. Acc., vol. "New Perspectives in Theoretical Chemistry", 116, 206 (2006).
- Y. V. Pereverzev, O. V. Prezhdo, L. R. Dalton, “Macroscopic order and electro-optic response of dipolar chromophore-polymer materials”, ChemPhysChem, 5 1821 (2004).
