= Oleg Amirbayov =

Azerbaijani actor

- Oleq Arnoldoviç Əmirbəyov
- Born: Oleg Arnoldovich Amirbayov; December 16, 1986 (age 39); Baku, Azerbaijan SSR, USSR
- Citizenship: Azerbaijan
- Education: Azerbaijan State University of Culture and Arts
- Occupations: actor, TV host, journalist
- Years active: 2010–present
- Television: AzTv; Mədəniyyət; Mir
- Children: Jamil
- Parents: Arnold Kharchenko (father); Rita Amirbayova (mother)

Oleg Arnoldovich Amirbayov (Azerbaijani: Oleq Arnoldoviç Əmirbəyov; born December 16, 1986) is an Azerbaijani theatre and film actor, TV host, and journalist of Russian descent.

== Life ==
Oleg Arnoldovich Amirbayov was born on December 16, 1986, in Baku, then capital of Azerbaijani SSR, one of the soviet socialist republics of the USSR. His parents were Merited artists of Azerbaijan. His father was Arnold Kharchenko, while his mother was Rita Amirbayova. In 2009 he graduated from Azerbaijan State University of Culture and Arts. Since 2010 Amirbayov worked in the Azerbaijan State Russian Drama Theatre. He has also worked in AzTv and Mədəniyyət TV channels as a host. Apart from that, he has worked in the Russian Mir TV channel.

He is married and has a son named Jalil.
