= Oleg Ken =

Russian historian (1960–2007)

Oleg Nikolaevich Ken (Russian: Олег Николаевич Кен, March 13, 1960, Orsk, - October 28, 2007, Saint Petersburg) was a Russian historian who worked in Saint Petersburg at Herzen University and European University at Saint Petersburg and specialized in the history of the Soviet Union, Poland and European diplomacy of the 1920s-1930s.

Oleg Ken was born in Orsk, Orenburg Oblast, where his family lived in exile owing to their ethnic German origin. He entered undergraduate studies at Orel Pedagogical Institute, but in 1979 moved to Leningrad and in 1981 graduated from the Department of History of Leningrad State Pedagogical University. In 1990 Ken defended his Candidate of Sciences thesis "Great Britain and European security (1933-1935)". Since 1994 he had worked at European University at Saint Petersburg, where he was Secretary for Academic Affairs and earned his Doctor of Sciences degree. In 2005 he was appointed Full Professor at Herzen University. He died from heart failure in his sleep in his apartment on October 28, 2007.
