= Oleg Pichugin =

Russian footballer and coach

Personal information
- Full name: Oleg Yuryevich Pichugin
- Date of birth: 14 March 1974 (age 52)
- Place of birth: Nizhny Tagil, Russian SFSR
- Height: 1.70 m (5 ft 7 in)
- Position: Midfielder

Team information
- Current team: FC Ural Yekaterinburg (U-19 manager)

Youth career
- FC Uralets Nizhny Tagil

Senior career*
Years	Team	Apps	(Gls)
1991–1996	FC Uralets Nizhny Tagil	96	(11)
1997	FC Irtysh Tobolsk	27	(5)
1998–2006	FC Ural Yekaterinburg	226	(32)
2007	FC Neftekhimik Nizhnekamsk	24	(2)
2008–2009	FC Torpedo Miass (amateur)		

Managerial career
- 2013–2015: FC Ural Yekaterinburg (reserves assistant)
- 2015: FC Ural Yekaterinburg (reserves)
- 2015–2016: FC Ural Yekaterinburg (reserves assistant)
- 2017–2018: FC Ural-2 Yekaterinburg
- 2018–2019: FC Ural Yekaterinburg (U-19 assistant)
- 2021–: FC Ural Yekaterinburg (U-19)
- * Club domestic league appearances and goals

Oleg Yuryevich Pichugin (Russian: Олег Юрьевич Пичугин; born 14 March 1974) is a Russian football coach and a former player. He is the manager of the Under-19 squad of FC Ural Yekaterinburg.

== Club career ==
He played 5 seasons in the Russian Football National League for FC Uralets Nizhny Tagil and FC Ural Yekaterinburg.
