= Oleg Yeprintsev =

Russian footballer

Personal information
- Full name: Oleg Leonidovich Yeprintsev
- Date of birth: March 19, 1962 (age 64)
- Place of birth: Karabulak, Russian SFSR
- Height: 1.78 m (5 ft 10 in)
- Positions: Midfielder; striker

Team information
- Current team: PS Kemi (manager)

Senior career*
Years	Team	Apps	(Gls)
1988	FC Saturn Ramenskoye	30	(1)
1990–1991	Kemin Palloseura	16	(8)
1991	MYPA	8	(2)
1993–1995	Visa Kemi	?	(19)
1995	Kemin Palloseura	13	(4)
1996–1998	Kemin Pallotoverit-85	41	(8)
1999–2002	TP-47	26	(1)

Managerial career
- 2003–2009: TP-47
- 2010–2011: PS Kemi
- 2012–2017: TP-47
- 2022–: PS Kemi
- * Club domestic league appearances and goals

Oleg Leonidovich Yeprintsev (Russian: Олег Леонидович Епринцев; born March 19, 1962) is a retired Russian footballer and current manager of PS Kemi.
