= Oleg Davydov (ice hockey) =

Russian ice hockey player (born 1971)

Oleg Davydov (Russian: Олег Давыдов)
Personal information
- Nationality: Russian
- Born: 16 March 1971 (age 54) Chelyabinsk, Russia

Sport
- Sport: Ice hockey

Oleg Davydov (born 16 March 1971) is a Russian ice hockey player. He competed in the men's tournament at the 1994 Winter Olympics.

== Career statistics ==
=== Regular season and playoffs ===
| | | | Regular season | | | | | Playoffs |
| Season | Team | League | GP | G | A | Pts | PIM | GP | G | A | Pts | PIM |
|---|---|---|---|---|---|---|---|---|---|---|---|---|
| 1988–89 | Metallurg Chelyabinsk | URS.2 | 23 | 4 | 2 | 6 | 6 | — | — | — | — | — |
| 1989–90 | Traktor Chelyabinsk | URS | 16 | 0 | 0 | 0 | 6 | — | — | — | — | — |
| 1989–90 | Metallurg Chelyabinsk | URS.2 | 2 | 0 | 1 | 1 | 2 | — | — | — | — | — |
| 1990–91 | Traktor Chelyabinsk | URS | 20 | 0 | 0 | 0 | 12 | — | — | — | — | — |
| 1991–92 | Traktor Chelyabinsk | CIS | 36 | 3 | 1 | 4 | 26 | 8 | 2 | 1 | 3 | 2 |
| 1992–93 | Traktor Chelyabinsk | IHL | 41 | 5 | 7 | 12 | 16 | 8 | 1 | 3 | 4 | 8 |
| 1993–94 | Traktor Chelyabinsk | IHL | 42 | 2 | 7 | 9 | 26 | 6 | 1 | 0 | 1 | 2 |
| 1994–95 | Traktor Chelyabinsk | IHL | 52 | 3 | 5 | 8 | 36 | 3 | 0 | 1 | 1 | 0 |
| 1995–96 | Lada Togliatti | IHL | 52 | 3 | 7 | 10 | 18 | 7 | 0 | 1 | 1 | 4 |
| 1996–97 | Lada Togliatti | RSL | 42 | 3 | 5 | 8 | 30 | 11 | 1 | 2 | 3 | 4 |
| 1997–98 | Lada Togliatti | RSL | 45 | 5 | 13 | 18 | 38 | 5 | 1 | 1 | 2 | 4 |
| 1998–99 | Lada Togliatti | RSL | 35 | 4 | 6 | 10 | 57 | — | — | — | — | — |
| 1999–2000 | Lada Togliatti | RSL | 36 | 3 | 8 | 11 | 69 | — | — | — | — | — |
| 2000–01 | Metallurg Magnitogorsk | RSL | 44 | 2 | 6 | 8 | 48 | 12 | 1 | 2 | 3 | 8 |
| 2001–02 | Metallurg Magnitogorsk | RSL | 51 | 6 | 11 | 17 | 76 | 9 | 0 | 1 | 1 | 4 |
| 2002–03 | Metallurg Magnitogorsk | RSL | 47 | 3 | 10 | 13 | 32 | 3 | 0 | 1 | 1 | 2 |
| 2003–04 | Metallurg Magnitogorsk | RSL | 58 | 5 | 13 | 18 | 56 | 14 | 0 | 1 | 1 | 10 |
| 2004–05 | Traktor Chelyabinsk | RUS.2 | 5 | 0 | 1 | 1 | 6 | 8 | 0 | 0 | 0 | 4 |
| 2004–05 | Traktor–2 Chelyabinsk | RUS.3 | 4 | 0 | 0 | 0 | 16 | — | — | — | — | — |
| 2005–06 | Lokomotiv Yaroslavl | RSL | 26 | 0 | 2 | 2 | 20 | 11 | 1 | 1 | 2 | 12 |
| URS/CIS totals | | | 72 | 3 | 1 | 4 | 44 | 8 | 2 | 1 | 3 | 2 |
| IHL totals | | | 187 | 13 | 26 | 39 | 96 | 24 | 2 | 5 | 7 | 14 |
| RSL totals | | | 384 | 31 | 74 | 105 | 426 | 72 | 4 | 9 | 13 | 50 |

=== International ===
| Year | Team | Event | GP | G | A | Pts | PIM |
|---|---|---|---|---|---|---|---|
| 1989 | Soviet Union | EJC | 6 | 3 | 4 | 7 | 0 |
| 1994 | Russia | OG | 8 | 1 | 0 | 1 | 0 |
| Senior totals | | | 8 | 1 | 0 | 1 | 0 |

"Oleg Davydov". Elite Prospects.
