= Oleg Leonov =

Oleg Leonov may refer to:

- Oleg Leonov (footballer) (born 2001), Russian football player
- Oleg Leonov (politician) (born 1970), Russian activist and politician
