= Oleg Sapožnin =

Estonian sports official and sports personnel

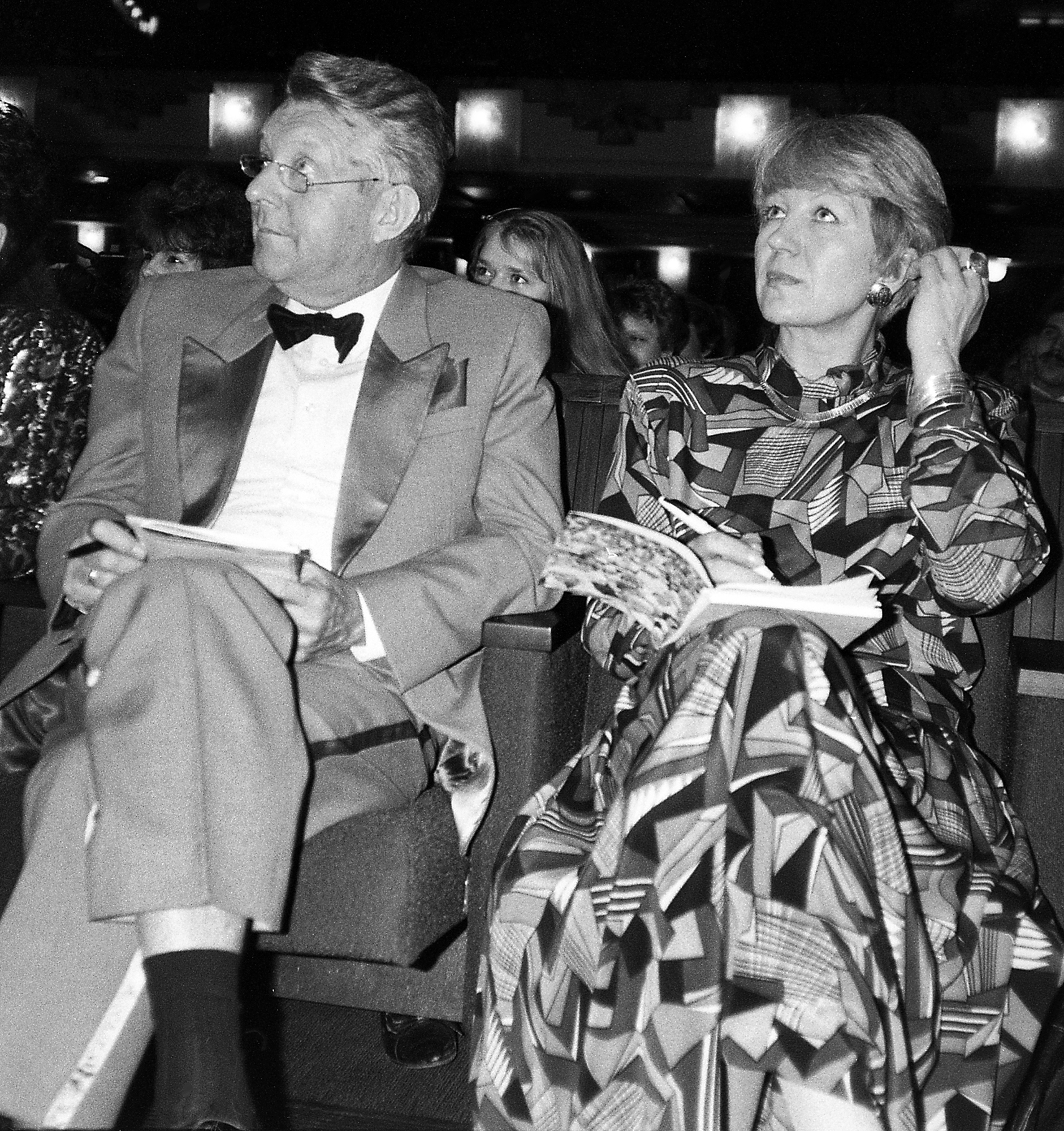
Oleg Sapožnin and fashion artist Krista Kajandu in 1988

Oleg Sapožnin (27 December 1931 Tallinn – 2 July 2014 Tallinn) was an Estonian sports official (referee/umpire) and sport personnel.

In 1954 he graduated from Tallinn Polytechnical Institute in electrical engineering.

From 1952 to 1992 he was a member of the board of Estonian Cycling Federation; 1965-1983 its chairman.

From 1981 to 1994 he was the head of Estonian Philharmonic (later Eesti Kontsert).

From 1992 to 2001 he was a member of Estonian Olympic Committee.

He was a sports referee/umpire in several major sport competitions, including the Olympic Games.

Awards:

- 1997 UCI honorary order (Estonian: UCI aumärk)
- 2001 IOC yearly award "Sport and voluntarism" (Estonian: Sport ja vabatahtlikkus)
