= Oleg Pinchuk =

Ukrainian artist

- Олег Степанович Пінчук
- Born: Oleg Stepanovych Pinchuk; June 15, 1960 (age 66); Drohobych, Lviv Oblast, Ukrainian SSR
- Education: National Academy of Visual Arts and Architecture
- Known for: master of bronze sculpture and art installations
- Website: https://olegpinchuk.pro

Oleg Pinchuk (Ukrainian: Олег Степанович Пінчук; born 15 June 1960, Drohobych, Lviv Oblast) is a Ukrainian painter, sculptor and collector. Honored artist of Ukraine. He was the Head at M17 Contemporary Art Center and the adviser to the Minister of Culture of Ukraine.

== Exhibitions ==
Oleg Pinchuk is a participant of exhibitions: Cite Internationale des Arts, Ukrainian Seasons (France), KyivArt Contemporary, Great Sculpture Salons (Mystetskyi Arsenal, Kyiv), Kanagawa Municipal Gallery (Japan).

Pinchuk's works are in the collections of the Kunsthistorisches Museum in Vienna (Austria), at Cartier jewelry company in Geneva (Switzerland), Espace Pierre Cardin in Paris (France), Riga Museum of Foreign Collections (Latvia), Moscow Museum of Modern Art, National Museum of the History of Ukraine, Andrey Sheptytsky National Museum of Lviv and others. Monumental works are located in the historical centers of European cities. Also, Pinchuk's sculpture was included in the top lots at Phillips.

== Awards ==
- Honored artist of Ukraine

== Sources ==
"Oleh Pinchuk". ieu.edu.ua. European Art School.
