= Oleg Perepelitsyn =

Russian footballer

Personal information
- Full name: Oleg Nikolayevich Perepelitsyn
- Date of birth: 3 August 1969 (age 57)
- Place of birth: Kamyshin, Russian SFSR
- Height: 1.78 m (5 ft 10 in)
- Positions: Defender; midfielder

Youth career
- SDYuSShOR-2 Kamyshin
- ShISP Stavropol

Senior career*
Years	Team	Apps	(Gls)
1986–1987	FC Lokomotiv Mineralnye Vody	50	(1)
1990–1992	FC Tekstilshchik Kamyshin	67	(2)
1992–1994	FC Avangard Kamyshin	71	(9)
1995–1996	FC Volgodonsk	60	(3)
1997–1998	FC Sodovik Sterlitamak	46	(3)
1998	FC Salyut Saratov	13	(0)
1999	FC Khopyor Balashov (amateur)		
2000	FC Khopyor Balashov	24	(1)
- * Club domestic league appearances and goals

Oleg Nikolayevich Perepelitsyn (Russian: Олег Николаевич Перепелицын; born 3 August 1969) is a former Russian football player.
