= Oleg Gusev =

Oleg Gusev may refer to:

- Oleg Gusev (canoeist) (born 1996), Russian canoeist
- Oleh Husiev (born 1983), Ukrainian football player
- Oleg Andreyevich Gusev (born 1964), Russian entrepreneur from Urals
