= Helgi the Sharp =

Helgi the Sharp may refer to:

- Helgi the Sharp (Zealand)
- Helgi the Sharp (Ringerike)
