= Oleg Zelenin =

Russian footballer

Personal information
- Full name: Oleg Yuryevich Zelenin
- Date of birth: 4 March 1989 (age 37)
- Height: 1.78 m (5 ft 10 in)
- Position: Midfielder

Senior career*
Years	Team	Apps	(Gls)
2008	FC Zvezda Irkutsk	4	(0)
2009	FC Radian-Baikal Irkutsk (amateur)		
2010	FC Radian-Baikal Irkutsk	0	(0)
2010	FC Zenit-Radian Irkutsk (amateur)		
2014	FC IrAero Irkutsk		
- * Club domestic league appearances and goals

Oleg Yuryevich Zelenin (Russian: Олег Юрьевич Зеленин; born 4 March 1989) is a Russian former professional football player.

== Club career ==
He played in the Russian Football National League for FC Zvezda Irkutsk in 2008.
