= Oleg Svyatoslavich =

Oleg Svyatoslavich may refer to:

- Oleg of Drelinia (died 977), prince of the Drevlians
- Oleg I of Chernigov (died 1115), prince of Chernigov
- Oleg II Svyatoslavich, prince Novgorod-Seversk (r. 1164–1180)
- Oleg III Svyatoslavich (died 1204), prince of Chernigov
