= Oleg Rylkov =

Russian serial killer, serial rapist and pedophile (born 1966)

- Born: Oleg Viktorovich Rylkov; 21 December 1966 (age 59); Zelenodolsk, Tatar ASSR, RSFSR
- Other name: "The Tolyatti Ripper"
- Known for: Raping girls and serial murders
- Conviction: Murder
- Penalty: Death; commuted to life imprisonment

Details
- Victims: 12
- Span of crimes: 1993–1997
- Country: Russia
- State: Samara
- Date apprehended: 1 July 1997
- Imprisoned at: Black Dolphin Prison, Sol-Iletsk, Orenburg Oblast

Oleg Viktorovich Rylkov (Russian: Оле́г Викторович Рылько́в; born 21 December 1966), known as the Tolyatti Ripper (Russian: Тольяттинский потрошитель, romanized: Tolyattinsky potroshitel), is a Russian serial killer, child rapist and pedophile. Between 1992 and 1997, he raped 37 (some sources say 39) underage girls and killed 12 people in the city of Tolyatti, in the Samara Oblast.

== Crimes ==
Between 1992 and 1995, Rylkov committed a series of rapes on girls aged between 6 and 13. Taking advantage of the lack of adults, he broke into the victims' apartments (the victims said that Rylkov knocked on the door, then asked for water or to call an ambulance), raped them, and then robbed the apartment.

On 7 February 1996, Rylkov committed his first murder, killing 7-year-old Ruslan Tkachev. He easily convinced the boy to come with him and then brutally killed him in the Portship village of Tolyatti, inflicting several dozen stab wounds; Rylkov then cut off the boy's genitals, ears, tongue, and gouged out his eyes. Subsequently, when the corpse was discovered, experts could not immediately determine the sex of the victim due to the heavy mutilation.

Not long thereafter Rylkov was detained by police for public intoxication and lacking his identification papers, but was released after three days. Subsequently, he committed several dozen rapes, two of which ended in brutal murders. In one of these attacks, he broke into an apartment where an underage boy and his sister were. The brother miraculously managed to escape, but Rylkov killed the boy's sister with an axe. Soon Rylkov was identified by witnesses and was put on a wanted list by the judicial police.

On 20 July 1996, Rylkov killed another girl. The mutilated body was found in an abandoned bunker on the territory of a military unit. This time there were witnesses who claimed to have seen Rylkov with the girl on Topolina Street in Tolyatti, and a facial composite was soon created. By the evening, the man was identified as Oleg Rylkov. A few days later a police patrol, under the guise of selling counterfeit money, arrested Rylkov, who pretended to be a friend of his named Yashchenko. The ruse worked: Rylkov was let go after taking a pledge not to leave the area. When several days later the real Yashchenko was summoned to the prosecutor's office, Rylkov's trickery was revealed. Yashchenko told police he believed Rylkov was planning to go to Novokuznetsk.

At that time, another serial killer was operating in Novokuznetsk, whose modus operandi was similar to Rylkov's. Rylkov was also suspected of the murders of more than 20 children around the city. Through the television and newspapers, his name and data were given out. The investigation team working on the case of the "Novokuznetsk Monster" was initially unsuccessful in capturing Rylkov.

Rylkov was soon arrested in Tolyatti. Another victim of his was a 40-year-old woman who was sheltered at his dacha, whom he killed with an axe. As it later turned out, he never left Tolyatti, and was not involved in the Novokuznetsk murders, for which Alexander Spesivtsev was soon detained. Rylkov confessed to all of his crimes, except the very first murder. When asked about what he felt during the murders, he replied: "It sounds blasphemous, but something [...] a higher pleasure, or something". In 1998, Rylkov was sentenced to death for his crimes, but due to the moratorium on the death sentence it was replaced with life imprisonment. The Supreme Court of Russia upheld the verdict without change.

After spending a little more than a year in prison, Rylkov confessed to his first murder. In June 2000 he was sentenced to 15 years in prison, but since he was already given life imprisonment, the sentence remained the same. Currently, he is serving his sentence at the Black Dolphin Prison.

In early 2012, Rylkov admitted that on the evening of 27 May 1994 in the attic of a house on the Ordzhonikidze Boulevard, he raped a 12-year-old child. In the autumn of the same year, Tolyatti police reported the disclosure of the rape of a minor committed more than 18 years ago in the elevator of a house on Sverdlov Street, to which Rylkov also confessed to.

In 2013, Rylkov confessed to murdering a 45-year-old woman in 1993, whose corpse was found with multiple knife injuries to the chest in the forest near the "Prilesye" sanatorium. However, the Investigative Committee of Russia could not confirm this, and the materials were sent back to the police.

In 2020 Rylkov was found guilty of the murders of two additional women and was sentenced to 20 years in prison. He is a suspect in three additional murders but has not been charged.

== In the media ==
- Documentary film "Sentenced to the Black Dolphin" from the series by Vakhtang Mikeladze "Sentenced to life"
- Documentary film "Maniacs from the Black Dolphin" (2008) from the series by Vakhtang Mikeladze "Lifelessly deprived of liberty"
- "Detective Stories" episode "Confessions of a maniac" (2009) - directed by Andrey Dutov
- The Belgorod Shooter, special report (TVC) (2013)

== See also ==
- List of Russian serial killers
