= Oleg Petrosyan =

Russian serial killer (born 1977)

- Олег Петросян
- Born: Oleg Gennadyevich Petrosyan; 20 November 1977 (age 48); Tbilisi, Georgian SSR, Soviet Union
- Other name: "Karate Maniac"
- Convictions: Murder (6 counts); Attempted murder (3 counts)
- Penalty: Compulsory treatment

Details
- Victims: 6–7
- Span of crimes: c. 1992–2008
- Country: Russia
- Date apprehended: Late 2008

Oleg Gennadyevich Petrosyan (Russian: Олег Геннадьевич Петросян; born 20 November 1977), also known as the Karate Maniac (Russian: Маньяк-каратист), is a Russian serial killer and sadist who committed assaults on pedestrians in Moscow between 2005 and 2008, which resulted in six deaths.

== Early life ==
Petrosyan was born in Tbilisi, in the Georgian SSR, on 20 November 1977. He developed mental health issues in his adolescence, and due to his fixation on violent movies, he took up karate. According to Petrosyan, at age 14, he beat a homeless passerby to death and watched the investigation from his window.

== Attacks ==
Petrosyan arrived in Moscow in 1998. He began to beat homeless people on Young Lenintsev Street in 2005 after inviting them to see his karate skills, though some sources claim the assaults were done without warning. The victims rarely reported the attacks to law enforcement.

On 13 October 2008, the body of a disfigured woman was found in a park near Izmailovskoye Highway. She had been covered in more than two dozen hatchet wounds. Detectives determined that the perpetrator was of unsound mind and connected the attack to other recent murders in the area. Witnesses described the attacker's appearance and a composite sketch was created. Petrosyan, looking identical to the sketch, was eventually arrested after being recognized in public near the Izmailovskoye Highway, after which he openly confessed.

On 16 November 2009, the Moscow City Court ruled that Petrosyan was guilty of three attempted murders and six successful murders—five with a hatchet and one by blows to the head with a stone. According to Petrosyan's own testimony, he committed a total of "about 30" attacks between 2005 and 2008. Due to his diagnosis of paranoid schizophrenia, he was sentenced to compulsory treatment in a psychiatric hospital, where he presumably remains today.

== See also ==
- List of Russian serial killers
