= Oleg Makarov =

Oleg Makarov may refer to:

- Oleh Makarov (footballer) (1929–1995), Soviet footballer
- Oleh Makarov (politician), Ukrainian lawyer and politician
- Oleg Makarov (cosmonaut) (1933–2003), Russian cosmonaut
- Oleg Makarov (figure skater) (born 1962), Soviet figure skater
