= Oleg Ponomaryov =

Russian footballer

Personal information
- Full name: Oleg Igorevich Ponomaryov
- Date of birth: 12 January 1991 (age 35)
- Place of birth: Barnaul, Russian SFSR
- Height: 1.78 m (5 ft 10 in)
- Position: Midfielder

Youth career
- FC Dynamo Barnaul

Senior career*
Years	Team	Apps	(Gls)
2007–2010	FC Dynamo Barnaul	6	(0)
2011	FC Barnaul		
2011	FC Torpedo Rubtsovsk (amateur)		
2012	FC Dynamo Biysk		
2012	FC Polimer Barnaul		
2012	AGPA Barnaul		
2013	FC Dynamo Biysk		
2013	FC Zvezda Sibirsky		
- * Club domestic league appearances and goals

Oleg Igorevich Ponomaryov (Russian: Олег Игоревич Пономарёв; born 12 January 1991) is a former Russian professional football player.

== Club career ==
He made his Russian Football National League debut for FC Dynamo Barnaul on 15 May 2008 in a game against FC Kuban Krasnodar. That was his only season in the FNL.
