= Andrei Savchenko =

Ukrainian ice hockey player

- Born: July 10, 1972 (age 54) Kiev, Ukrainian SSR, USSR
- Height: 5 ft 11 in (180 cm)
- Weight: 182 lb (83 kg; 13 st 0 lb)
- Position: Defence
- Shot: Left
- UKR team Former teams: Companion Kyiv; SHVSM Kyiv; Sokil Kyiv; Severstal Cherepovets; Krylya Sovetov Moscow; Ldinka Kiev; CSKA Moscow; Berkut Kyiv; Knoxville Ice Bears; Energia Kemerovo; Kazzinc-Torpedo; Neman Grodno; Bilyi Bars Brovary
- Playing career: 1988–2011
Medal record
Men's ice hockey
Representing Ukraine
Winter Universiade
Gold medal – first place	1999 Poprad	Team

Andrei Savchenko (born July 10, 1972) is a professional ice hockey defenceman currently playing for Companion Kyiv of the Ukrainian Major League.

Savchenko started his career for SHVSM Kyiv in the Ukrainian Major League and played for HC Sokil Kyiv after that.
