= Oleg Savchenko =

Oleg Savchenko may refer to:

- Oleg Savchenko (politician, born 1948), Russian politician
- Oleg Savchenko (politician, born 1966), Russian politician
- Oleg Savchenko (musician) (born 1989), Belarusian musician
