= Anton Arsenyev (footballer) =

Russian footballer

Personal information
- Full name: Anton Vladimirovich Arsenyev
- Date of birth: 22 March 1985 (age 41)
- Height: 1.84 m (6 ft 1/2 in)
- Position: Goalkeeper

Senior career*
Years	Team	Apps	(Gls)
2004–2008	FC Zenit-2 St. Petersburg	81	(0)
2009	FC Smena-Zenit St. Petersburg	8	(0)
2010–2012	FC Dynamo Vologda	55	(0)
2012–2013	FC Petrotrest Saint Petersburg	11	(0)
2013–2015	FC Dynamo Saint Petersburg	17	(0)
- * Club domestic league appearances and goals

Anton Vladimirovich Arsenyev (Russian: Антон Владимирович Арсеньев; born 22 March 1985) is a former Russian professional football player.

== Club career ==
He played 3 seasons in the Russian Football National League for FC Petrotrest Saint Petersburg and FC Dynamo Saint Petersburg.
