= Oleh Polyarush =

Ukrainian footballer

Personal information
- Full name: Oleh Mykolayovych Polyarush
- Date of birth: 10 September 1977 (age 49)
- Place of birth: Haisyn, Ukrainian SSR
- Height: 1.68 m (5 ft 6 in)
- Position: Midfielder

Senior career*
| Years | Team | Apps | (Gls) |
| 1995–1996 | Verkhovyna Uzhhorod | 31 | (1) |
| 1997–2001 | CSKA Kyiv | 22 | (0) |
| 1997–2001 | → CSKA-2 Kyiv | 125 | (16) |
| 2001–2002 | Arsenal Kyiv | 9 | (0) |
| 2001–2002 | → CSKA Kyiv | 16 | (1) |
| 2002 | Tavriya Simferopol | 1 | (0) |
| 2002–2003 | CSKA Kyiv | 21 | (0) |
| 2003 | Ural Yekaterinburg | 14 | (0) |
| 2004 | Torpedo-SKA Minsk | 5 | (0) |
| 2004–2005 | Nyva Vinnytsia | 30 | (0) |
| 2005–2006 | Mykolaiv | 42 | (1) |
| 2007–2008 | Taganrog | 47 | (2) |
| 2009 | Bataysk-2007 | 21 | (1) |
- * Club domestic league appearances and goals as of 19 November 2010

Oleh Mykolayovych Polyarush (Ukrainian: Олег Миколайович Поляруш; born 10 September 1977) is a Ukrainian professional footballer. In 2009, he played in the Russian Second Division for FC Bataysk-2007.
