= Oleg Babenkov =

Russian professional football player

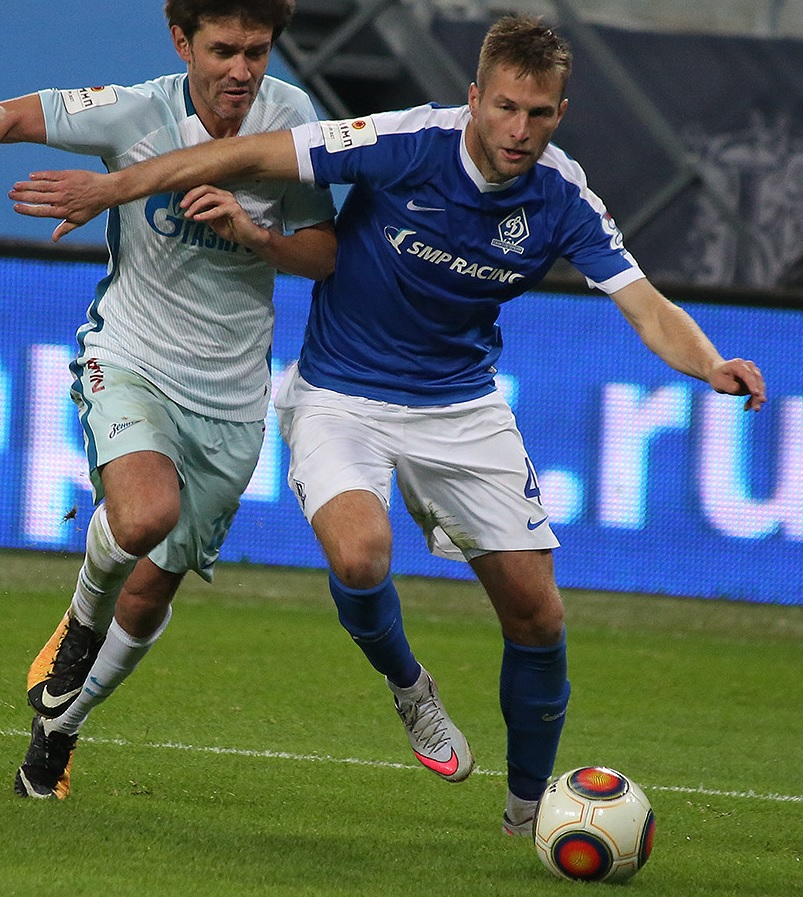
- Babenkov with Dynamo St. Petersburg in 2017

Personal information
- Full name: Oleg Mikhailovich Babenkov
- Date of birth: 21 June 1985 (age 41)
- Place of birth: Leningrad, Russian SFSR
- Height: 1.87 m (6 ft 2 in)
- Positions: Defender; midfielder

Senior career*
Years	Team	Apps	(Gls)
2005	FC Petrotrest St. Petersburg	5	(0)
2005	FC Volga Tver	11	(0)
2006	FC Petrotrest St. Petersburg	33	(1)
2007	FC Tekstilshchik-Telekom Ivanovo	23	(1)
2008	FC Metallurg-Kuzbass Novokuznetsk	6	(0)
2009	FC Smena-Zenit St. Petersburg	33	(1)
2010	FC Dynamo Vologda	32	(4)
2011–2013	FC Gornyak Uchaly	59	(4)
2013–2014	FC Tosno	34	(0)
2015	FC Khimik Dzerzhinsk	13	(2)
2015	FC Luch-Energiya Vladivostok	13	(0)
2016–2018	FC Dynamo St. Petersburg	63	(4)
2018–2019	FC Fakel Voronezh	22	(1)
2019–2020	FC Sokol Saratov	12	(0)
- * Club domestic league appearances and goals

Oleg Mikhailovich Babenkov (Russian: Олег Михайлович Бабенков; born 21 June 1985) is a Russian former professional football player.

== Club career ==
He made his Russian Football National League debut for FC Petrotrest Saint Petersburg on 9 May 2005 in a game against FC Avangard Kursk.
