= FC Yadro Saint Petersburg =

Russian football team based in Moscow

- Full name: Football Club Yadro Saint Petersburg
- Founded: 2019
- Chairman: Aleksey Kryukov
- Manager: Vacant
- League: TBC
- 2022–23: Russian Second League, Group 2, 21st
- Website: http://fc-yadro.ru/

FC Yadro Saint Petersburg (Russian: ФК «Ядро» (Санкт-Петербург)) is a Russian football team based in Saint Petersburg. It was founded in 2019.

== Club history ==
The club was formed in 2019 and played in local amateur competitions. It received a professional license for the 2022–23 season of the Russian Second League. The club failed to receive the license for the 2023–24 season.
