= Oleg Starykh =

American physicist

Oleg Alexandrovich Starykh (Russian: Олег Александрович Старых) is an American physicist.

Starykh earned a master's of science in physics from the Moscow Institute of Physics and Technology, then worked as a researcher for the Institute for High Pressure Physics before obtaining a doctorate in theoretical condensed matter physics at the Russian Academy of Sciences. Starykh split his postdoctoral research experience at the University of Houston's Texas Center for Superconductivity, the University of California, Davis, the University of Florida, and Yale University between 1993 and 2000.

Starykh subsequently began his teaching career at Hofstra University as an assistant professor. In 2004, he joined the University of Utah faculty as an associate professor, and was promoted to a full professorship in 2012. Starykh was elected a fellow of the American Physical Society in 2020.
