= Oleg Gerasimenko =

Russian footballer

Personal information
- Full name: Oleg Vladimirovich Gerasimenko
- Date of birth: 5 May 1990 (age 36)
- Place of birth: Voronezh, Russian SFSR
- Height: 1.72 m (5 ft 8 in)
- Position: Striker

Senior career*
Years	Team	Apps	(Gls)
2007–2011	FC Lokomotiv Liski	91	(11)
2011–2012	FC Fakel Voronezh	35	(4)
2012	→ FC Lokomotiv Liski (loan)	9	(3)
2013–2014	FC Lokomotiv Liski	29	(0)
2015	FC Oryol	1	(0)
2015	FC Khimik Rossosh		
2016	FC Spartak Rossosh		
2018	FC Khimik Rossosh		
- * Club domestic league appearances and goals

Oleg Vladimirovich Gerasimenko (Russian: Олег Владимирович Герасименко; born 5 May 1990) is a Russian former professional football player.

== Club career ==
He played one season in the Russian Football National League for FC Fakel Voronezh.
