= Oleg Sobirov =

Uzbekistani footballer

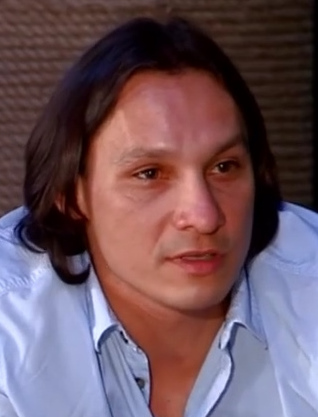
- Sobirov in 2016

Personal information
- Full name: Oleg Vladimirovich Sobirov
- Date of birth: 13 March 1981 (age 45)
- Place of birth: Uzbek SSR
- Height: 1.80 m (5 ft 11 in)
- Position: Defender

Team information
- Current team: FC Tobol
- Number: 13

Senior career*
Years	Team	Apps	(Gls)
1998–1999	FC Navbahor Namangan	4	(0)
1999–2000	FC Maritsa Plovdiv	0	(0)
2000–2001	FC Dustlik Tashkent	50	(4)
2002	FC Karpaty-2 Lviv	8	(0)
2002	FC Qizilqum Zarafshon	15	(0)
2003–2005	FC Ordabasy	88	(0)
2006	FC Aktobe	13	(2)
2008	FC Zhetysu	?	(?)
2009	FC Vostok	?	(?)
2010–	FC Tobol	?	(?)

International career
2001	Uzbekistan	6	(0)
- * Club domestic league appearances and goals

Oleg Vladimirovich Sobirov (Russian: Олег Владимирович Сабиров; born 13 March 1981) is an Uzbekistani professional footballer who plays for FC Tobol.
