= Football Federation of the Ukrainian SSR =

Governing body of association football in Ukrainian SSR

Soviet Union
- Founded: 1959
- Folded: 1991
- FIFA affiliation: none
- Soviet Union affiliation: 1936
- President: Mykola Fominykh

Football Federation of the Ukrainian SSR (Ukrainian: Федерація Футболу УРСР) was a regional football federation of the Soviet Union that in 1991 was transformed into the Football Federation of Ukraine.

== History ==
=== Football Federation of the Ukrainian SSR ===
The Football Federation of the Ukrainian SSR was created in 1959 as part of the All-Union reorganization of sport administration in the Soviet Union. The Federation was established in place of the Football section of the Higher Council of Physical Culture that was originally created back in 1923. The Higher Council of Physical Culture was the main body of sports administration in the Republic.

(Logo of Football Federation of UkrSSR)
In January 1964, at the plenum of Football Federation of UkrSSR was elected a new president Fedor Martyanovych Martyniuk who was the head of the Zhytomyr Oblast council of the Union of sport associations and organizations. He also instantaneously was included into the presidium of the Football Federation of USSR.

On December 29, 1968, the State Committee of Fitness and Sport was reinstated by the Soviet Council of Ministers. A similar committee was created also by the UkrSSR Council of Ministers called simply Sport Committee of UkrSSR. Since 1969 the Football Federation of USSR was overtaken by the Football Directorate of that Committee, while the Ukrainian Federation by its own Committee. The Chief director of the Sport Committee of UkrSSR was appointed Oleh Oleksandrovych Oshenkov in 1971 (simultaneously being elected as the president of the Republican Federation), a position that supersedes the president of a federation.

In March 1976, were created several commissions of the Federation. The head of the scientific-methodical council was elected V.Kozhukhov.

- Commission of mass-organized activities: Yu.Pustovarov
- Sport-technical commission: Yu.Khodak
- Children-Youth commission: V.Pashchenko
- Commission of Propaganda and Agitation: V.Oratovsky
- Commission of sport structures and inventory: V.Korytny

By the end of 1977, Mykola Fedorovych Fominykh replaced Oleh Oleksandrovych Oshenkov as the Chief director of the Republican Sport Committee. In 1980 a special directorate was created the Directorate of sport structures director of which was appointed B.M.Voskresensky. In 1983 the Football Federation of UkrSSR was recognized as the best in the Soviet Union.

On April 29, 1987, the new plenum of the Federation elected Yuriy Oleksandrovych Pustovarov as its president for his successful work with the Commission of mass-organized activities replacing M.Fominykh who was appointed as his deputy. Remarkable is the fact that at the plenum Viktor Bannykov was elected to the presidium of the Federation. The head of the scientific-methodical council was elected A.Popov.

- Commission of mass-organized activities: F.Martyniuk
- Sport-technical commission: V.Baydiuk
- Republican Collegiate of Referees: L.Sarkisov
- Children-Youth commission: M.Chernysh
- Committee of Development Activities: V.Oratovsky
- Council of Football Veterans: A.Idzkovsky
- Commission of Propaganda and Agitation: B.Nartovsky
- Commission of sport structures and inventory: V.Korytny

In July 1989, in Soviet Union was created the Union of football leagues of USSR as an autonomous organization to improve the organization the football sport events. Among its administrative council were several Ukrainian coaches such as Valeriy Lobanovskiy, Yevhen Lemeshko, and others. The constituent conference of this organization took place at the end of July to accept the statute of the organization and review the structure of organization 1990 Soviet championship. However the statute of the Union was liquidated by the chief director of the State Sport Committee of USSR V.Koloskov and the Union was simply incorporated into the Soviet Federation as one of its numerous other committees. On January 9–10, the All-Union football conference took place in Moscow that decided to simplify the Union of football leagues of USSR and replace it with some sort of committee. Valeriy Lobanovskiy was called for an interview in the ideological department of the Central Committee of Soviet Communist Party to find a common ground.

=== Presidents ===
==== Football section ====
- M.Ya. Levitin, 1932–1934
- I.S. Kosmachov, 1934–1937
- Samuyil Iyezekirovych Khavchyn, 1937–1941 (head of the football-hockey section)
- Stepan Dmytrovych Romanenko, 1944–1959

==== Football federation ====
- Mykola Mykolayovych Balakin, 1959
- Mykola Stepanovych Kuznetsov, 1959 – May 1963 (Kuznetsov had intentions to get a membership in FIFA as an independent association)
- Anton Leonardovych Idzkovsky, May 1963 – Jan 1964
- Fedir Martyanovych Martyniuk, Jan 1964 – 1968
- Fedir Martyanovych Martyniuk, 1968 – 1971
- Oleh Oleksandrovych Oshenkov, 1971 – 1973
- Oleh Oleksandrovych Oshenkov, 1973 – Mar 18, 1975
  - V.Oratovsky (deputy)
  - Yu.Pustovarov (deputy)
- Mykola Fedorovych Fominykh, Mar 18, 1975 – Apr 29, 1987
  - V.Oratovsky (deputy)
  - Yu.Pustovarov (deputy)
- Yuriy Oleksandrovych Pustovarov, Apr 29, 1987 – Dec 1989
  - Mykola Fedorovych Fominykh
  - V.Pashchenko
- Mykola Fedorovych Fominykh, Dec 1989 – Dec 1991

Notes:

- According to the Football Federation of Ukraine secretary Klavdia Kirianova, Pustovarov was never a president.

== Leagues ==
The Federation conducted games for the Championship of the Ukrainian SSR from 1960 to 1991 which were part of the Soviet Class B (1960–1969), Second Group of A (1970), Soviet Second League (1971–1989) and Soviet Second League B (1990–1991). The central cup competition was the Ukrainian Cup or (Cup of the Ukrainian SSR), aside of which in the 1970s there also was an amateur cup competitions. The Ukrainian Cup of the Ukrainian SSR was mostly conducted among the members of the Soviet Second League. There also were zonal competitions among teams of physical culture, known as KFK competition.

- Championship of the Soviet Ukraine – Championship of Cities
- Ukrainian Soviet competitions – Class B and Soviet Second League
