= Anatoliy Konkov =

Soviet-Ukrainian footballer (1949–2024)

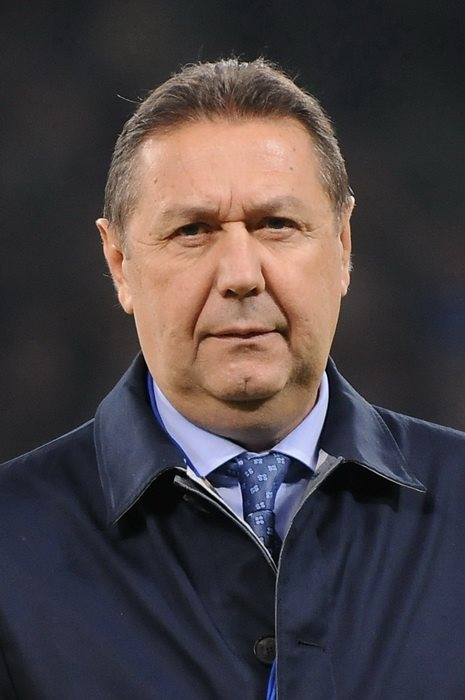
- Konkov in 2012

Personal information
- Full name: Anatoliy Dmytrovych Konkov
- Date of birth: 19 September 1949
- Place of birth: Krasnyi Luch, Ukrainian SSR, Soviet Union
- Date of death: 4 October 2024 (aged 75)
- Place of death: Kyiv, Ukraine
- Height: 1.80 m (5 ft 11 in)
- Positions: Midfielder; sweeper

Youth career
- 1959–1965: Avanhard Kramatorsk

Senior career*
| Years | Team | Apps | (Gls) |
| 1965–1968 | Avanhard Kramatorsk | 22 | (5) |
| 1968–1974 | Shakhtar Donetsk | 141 | (20) |
| 1975–1981 | Dynamo Kyiv | 193 | (10) |

International career
| 1971–1978 | USSR | 47 | (8) |
| 1976 | USSR (Olympic) | 2 | (0) |

Managerial career
- 1982: Tavriya Simferopol (assistant)
- 1983–1984: Tavriya Simferopol
- 1986–1989: Shakhtar Donetsk
- 1990: Zenit Leningrad
- 1993–1994: Ukraine U18
- 1994: Ukraine U21
- 1995: Ukraine
- 1996–1997: Ukraine students
- 1998: Mykolaiv
- 1998–2000: Vorskla Poltava
- 2000–2002: Stal Alchevsk
- 2003: Metalurh Donetsk (sporting director)
- 2004–2006: Inter Baku
- 2008–2012: Stal Alchevsk (sporting director)
Medal record
Men's Football
Representing Soviet Union
Olympic Games
| Bronze medal – third place | 1976 Montreal | Team competition |
UEFA European Championship
| Silver medal – second place | 1972 Belgium |
- * Club domestic league appearances and goals

Anatoliy Konkov (Ukrainian: Анатолій Дмитрович Коньков; 19 September 1949 – 4 October 2024) was a Soviet football player from Ukraine and a Soviet and later Ukrainian football manager. Native of Eastern Ukraine, he made a football career in Dynamo Kyiv of 1970s. He was honored as the Merited Master of Sports of the USSR (1982). Konkov served as the President of the Football Federation of Ukraine in September 2012.

== Career ==
A native of Krasnyi Luch, Luhansk Oblast, in the late 1950s, Konkov began his football career in Kramatorsk, Donetsk Oblast for local Avanhard, and his first coach was Yuriy Nesterenko. When Konkov was about 6–7 years of old, his father was hired by the Novokramatorsk Machinebuilding Factory and the family moved to Kramatorsk. At 8, Konkov joined the Avanhard preparation group that existed along with the team of masters. Konkov made his debut at the professional level while playing for the Avanhard football team of masters in the late 1960s. At that time, Avanhard played in the USSR Championship Class B (tier 3).

In late 1968, Konkov made it to the top performer of the region Shakhtar Donetsk, where he played until 1974. To Shakhtar, Konkov was invited by Oleg Oshenkov and escorted by Ivan Babushko. Anatoliy Konkov made his first appearance for Shakhtar on 3 November 1968, while visiting Kairat Almaty in the Class A match (top tier). For the first couple of seasons in Shakhtar, Konkov was playing for the reserves as well as the first team.

In 1974, he moved to Dynamo Kyiv, with which he won several European honors. His transfer was coordinated personally by the First Secretary Volodymyr Shcherbytskyi.

During his playing career, Konkov played in defense as a stopper. He won four Soviet championships, was a holder of the Soviet Cup, UEFA Supercup, and UEFA Cup Winners' Cup 1974-75. He was a vice-champion of Europe '72, and received an Olympic bronze medal in 1976.

In 1979 Konkov played couple of games for Ukraine at the Spartakiad of the Peoples of the USSR.

After retiring as a player, Konkov became a coach, coaching clubs of the Soviet Union, Ukraine, and Azerbaijan. On 5 January 1995 Konkov was appointed the head coach of the Ukraine national football team.

On 2 September 2012, he was elected the President of the Football Federation of Ukraine, becoming the second president after Viktor Bannikov, who had a professional player career.

== Death ==
On 4 October 2024, it was announced that Konkov had died at the age of 75. He died in Kyiv and was buried at Baikove Cemetery.

== Statistics ==
=== International ===
Appearances and goals by national team and year
| National team | Year | Apps | Goals |
|---|---|---|---|
| Soviet Union | 1971 | 4 | 0 |
| Soviet Union | 1972 | 6 | 2 |
| Soviet Union | 1973 | 2 | 0 |
| Soviet Union | 1974 | 2 | 0 |
| Soviet Union | 1975 | 7 | 3 |
| Soviet Union | 1976 | 8 | 0 |
| Soviet Union | 1977 | 10 | 1 |
| Soviet Union | 1978 | 8 | 2 |
| Career total | | 47 | 8 |

Scores and results list Soviet Union's goal tally first, score column indicates score after each Konkov goal.

List of international goals scored by Anatoliy Konkov
| No. | Date | Venue | Opponent | Score | Result | Competition |
|---|---|---|---|---|---|---|
| 1 | 19 April 1972 | Central Stadium, Kyiv, Soviet Union | Peru | 2–0 | 2–0 | Friendly |
| 2 | 14 June 1972 | Stade Émile Versé, Brussels, Belgium | Hungary | 1–0 | 1–0 | UEFA Euro 1972 |
| 3 | 8 June 1975 | Lenin Central Stadium, Moscow, Soviet Union | Italy | 1–0 | 1–0 | Friendly |
| 4 | 12 November 1975 | Central Stadium, Kyiv, Soviet Union | Switzerland | 1–0 | 4–1 | UEFA Euro 1976 qualifying |
| 5 | 29 November 1975 | 23 August Stadium, Bucharest, Romania | Romania | 2–1 | 2–2 | Friendly |
| 6 | 24 April 1977 | Lenin Central Stadium, Moscow, Soviet Union | Greece | 1–0 | 2–0 | 1978 FIFA World Cup qualification |
| 7 | 26 February 1978 | El Harti Stadium, Marrakesh, Morocco | Morocco | 2–1 | 3–2 | Friendly |
| 8 | 5 April 1978 | Hrazdan Central Stadium, Yerevan, Soviet Union | Finland | 1–0 | 10–2 | Friendly |

=== Manager ===
As of 27 September 2013.

| Team | From | To | Record | | | | | | | |
| Team | From | To | G | W | D | L | GF | GA | GD | Win % |
|---|---|---|---|---|---|---|---|---|---|---|
| Ukraine | 5 January 1995 | 11 November 1995 | 7 | 3 | 0 | 4 | 8 | 13 | −5 | 42.86 |

== Honours and awards ==
=== Sports honours ===
- Soviet Football Championship
  - Winner (4): 1975, 1977, 1980, 1981
  - Runner-up (2): 1976 (a), 1978
- Soviet Football Cup
  - Winner (1): 1978
- UEFA Cup Winners' Cup
  - Winner (1): 1975
- UEFA Super Cup
  - Winner (1): 1975
- UEFA Euro
  - Runner-up (1): 1972
- Summer Olympics
  - Bronze medal recipient: 1976

Individual

- The best 33 football players of the Soviet Union (9): No. 1 (1975-1978); No. 2 (1979-1981); No. 3 (1971, 1973)

=== State awards ===
- Order of Merit
  - 3rd Class (2004), 2nd Class (2015), 1st Class (2020)

| Preceded by Hryhoriy Surkis | Presidents of FFU; 2012–2015 | Succeeded by Andriy Pavelko |
