= 1965 Soviet Cup =

1965 Cup of USSR in Football
Кубок СССР

Tournament details
- Country: Soviet Union
- Dates: April 4 – August 15
- Teams: 56 (final stage)

Final positions
- Champions: Spartak Moscow
- Runners-up: Dinamo Minsk

The 1965 Soviet Cup was an association football cup competition of the Soviet Union. The winner of the competition, Spartak Moscow qualified for the continental tournament.

== Participating teams ==
Enter in Final round		Enter in Qualification round		
Class A		Class B 55/165 teams		
Group 1 17/17 teams ✓ Torpedo Moscow; ✓ Dinamo Kiev; ✓ CSKA Moscow; ✓ Dinamo Minsk; ✓ Dinamo Moscow; ✓ Dinamo Tbilisi; ✓ SKA Rostov-na-Donu; ✓ Spartak Moscow; ✓ Zenit Leningrad; ✓ Pakhtakor Tashkent; ✓ Neftianik Baku; ✓ Shakhter Donetsk; ✓ Krylya Sovetov Kuibyshev; ✓ Chernomorets Odessa; ✓ Lokomotiv Moscow; ✓ Torpedo Kutaisi; ✓ SKA Odessa	Group 2 30/32 teams ✓ Ararat Yerevan; ✓ Kairat Alma-Ata; ✓ Avangard Kharkov; ✗ Tekstilschik Ivanovo; ✓ Shinnik Yaroslavl; ✓ Uralmash Sverdlovsk; ✓ Zaria Lugansk; ✓ Dnepr Dnepropetrovsk; ✓ Karpaty Lvov; ✓ Zhalgiris Vilnius; ✓ Volga Gorkiy; ✓ Shakhter Karaganda; ✓ Terek Grozny; ✓ Moldova Kishenev; ✓ Daugava Riga; ✓ Lokomotiv Chelyabinsk; ✓ Alga Frunze; ✓ Traktor Volgograd; ✓ SKA Novosibirsk; ✓ Dinamo Leningrad; ✓ Lokomotiv Vinnitsa; ✓ Trud Voronezh; ✓ Politodel Tashkent Oblast; ✓ Spartak Gomel; ✓ Kuban Krasnodar; ✓ Lokomotiv Tbilisi; ✓ Stroitel Ashkhabad; ✓ Metallurg Zaporozhye; ✓ Energetik Dushanbe; ✗ Volga Kalinin; ✓ Dinamo Tallinn; ✓ Rostselmash Rostov-na-Donu	UkrSSR I ✓ SKA Kiev; ✓ Avangard Zholtye Vody; ✓ Kolos Poltava; ✓ Shakhter Aleksandria; ✓ Dnepr Kremenchuk; ✓ Dvina Vitebsk; ✓ Spartak Sumy; ✓ Kolgospnik Cherkassy; ✓ Desna Chernigov; ✓ Spartak Mogilev; ✓ Dneprovets Dneprodzerzhinsk; ✓ Gornyak Krivoi Rog; ✓ Chaika Balaklava; ✓ Avangard Kerch; ✓ Stroitel Beltsy; ✓ Lucaferule Tiraspol	UkrSSR II ✓ SKA Lvov; ✓ Avangard Ternopol; ✓ Zvezda Kirovograd; ✓ Dinamo Khmelnitskiy; ✓ Neftianik Drogobich; ✓ Spartak Ivano-Frankivsk; ✓ Bukovyna Chernovtsy; ✓ Polesie Zhitomir; ✓ Avtomobilist Odessa; ✓ Spartak Brest; ✓ Neman Grodno; ✓ Volyn Lutsk; ✓ Dinamo-2 Kiev; ✓ Verkhovina Uzhgorod; ✓ Dunayets Izmail; ✓ Kolgospnik Rovno	UkrSSR III ✓ Tavriya Simferopol; ✓ Shakhter Kadiyevka; ✓ Kommunarets Kommunarsk; ✓ SKF Sevastopol; ✓ Sudostoitel Nikolayev; ✓ Spartak Melitopol; ✓ Lokomotiv Kherson; ✓ Khimik Severodonetsk; ✓ Shakhter Gorlovka; ✓ Torpedo Kharkov; ✓ Shakhter Torez; ✓ Trubnik Nikopol; ✓ Nistrul Bendery; ✓ Lokomotiv Donetsk; ✓ Shakhter Krasny Luch; ✓ Shakhter Yenakievo; ✓ Avangard Kramatorsk
Group 1 17/17 teams ✓ Torpedo Moscow; ✓ Dinamo Kiev; ✓ CSKA Moscow; ✓ Dinamo Minsk; ✓ Dinamo Moscow; ✓ Dinamo Tbilisi; ✓ SKA Rostov-na-Donu; ✓ Spartak Moscow; ✓ Zenit Leningrad; ✓ Pakhtakor Tashkent; ✓ Neftianik Baku; ✓ Shakhter Donetsk; ✓ Krylya Sovetov Kuibyshev; ✓ Chernomorets Odessa; ✓ Lokomotiv Moscow; ✓ Torpedo Kutaisi; ✓ SKA Odessa		others (6) ✓ Tekmash Kostroma; ✓ Znamia Truda Orekhovo-Zuyevo; ✓ Neftianik Fergana; ✓ Lokomotiv Krasnoyarsk; ✓ Trudovye Rezervy Kursk; ✓ Dinamo Sukhumi		

Source: []

Notes

- Teams from 6 other groups of Class B (RSFSR) were admitted to the next 1965–66 Soviet Cup, the final stage of which was taking place in 1966.

== Competition schedule ==
=== Preliminary stage ===
==== Group 1 (Ukraine) ====
===== First round =====
[Apr 4] 
Avangard Kerch                1-2  SKA Kiev 
  [Zolotaryov – Sukovitsyn, Kvasov] 
AVANGARD Zholtyye Vody        1-0  Kolos Poltava 
  [Y.Cherkasov] 
CHAIKA Balaklava              1-0  Spartak Sumy 
  [Smirnov] 
Dnepr Kremenchug              1-2  SPARTAK Mogilyov             [aet] 
  [P.Chekhovskiy 90 – M.Stuckmeister 20, I.Sitnikov 120] 
Gornyak Krivoi Rog            1-1  Desna Chernigov 
  [V.Plotnikov – Rozhanskiy] 
KOLHOSPNIK Cherkassy          2-1  Dvina Vitebsk                [aet] 
  [A.Andriyash, R.Avanesov pen – Y.Krivorot] 
Luchaferul Tiraspol           1-2  SHAKHTYOR Alexandria 
  [F.Izbash – Golikov, Val.Barylo] 
STROITEL Beltsy               3-2  Dneprovets Dneprodzerzhinsk  [aet] 
  [Zvarysh, Shmelenko pen, Kostinskiy – Kurchaninov, Snitko]

====== First round replays ======
[Apr 5] 
Gornyak Krivoi Rog            1-2  DESNA Chernigov 
  [Kulik – Tretyakov, Zarudny]

===== Quarterfinals =====
[Apr 14] 
DESNA Chernigov               4-3  Avangard Zholtyye Vody 
  [Shkolnikov-2, Dziapshipa, Katkov – Bukasov (D) og, Malchenko pen, Pomazan] 
Kolhospnik Cherkassy          2-3  SPARTAK Mogilyov 
  [A.Andriyash ?, V.Maksimov 70 – M.Stuckmeister 25, N.Nekozyrev 29, ?]  
SHAKHTYOR Alexandria          1-0  Stroitel Beltsy 
  [A.Tovt] 
SKA Kiev                      1-0  Chaika Balaklava 
  [Sukovitsyn]

===== Semifinals =====
[Apr 21] 
DESNA Chernigov               1-0  Shakhtyor Alexandria 
  [Mozgunov] 
SKA Kiev                      3-0  Spartak Mogilyov 
  [V.Kirsanov-2, I.Slavinskiy]

===== Final =====
[Apr 28] 
Desna Chernigov               0-0  SKA Kiev

====== Replay ======
[Apr 29] 
DESNA Chernigov               2-1  SKA Kiev 
  [Rozhanskiy, Zima (S) og – Sukovitsyn]

==== Group 2 (Ukraine) ====
===== First round =====
[Apr 4] 
AVANGARD Ternopol             1-0  Volyn Lutsk                  [aet] 
  [V.Badaikin] 
AVTOMOBILIST Odessa           1-0  Polesye Zhitomir 
  [Ustinov] 
BUKOVINA Chernovtsy           3-0  Neman Grodno 
  [V.Olshevskiy-2, V.Alutin] 
Dunayets Izmail               0-0  Spartak Brest 
Neftyanik Drogobych           1-2  DINAMO-2 Kiev 
  [B.Rossikhin - ?] 
SPARTAK Ivano-Frankovsk       1-0  Kolhospnik Rovno 
  [Petrash] 
Verkhovina Uzhgorod           0-0  Zvezda Kirovograd 
[Apr 8] 
SKA Lvov                      3-2  Dinamo Khmelnitskiy 
  [Zukauskas-2, Rudenko – Sarkisov, Belyak]

====== First round replays ======
[Apr 5] 
DUNAYETS Izmail               2-1  Spartak Brest                [aet] 
  [P.Merchanskiy, A.Shevchenko – Zhimerikin] 
Verkhovina Uzhgorod           w/o  ZVEZDA Kirovograd 
  [Verkhovina substituted 2 field players in the first match]

===== Quarterfinals =====
[Apr 14] 
AVANGARD Ternopol             2-1  SKA Lvov 
  [Yurov, Kotyolkin – Voznyuk] 
DUNAYETS Izmail               2-1  Avtomobilist Odessa          [aet] 
  [P.Merchanskiy, Y.Babak – L.Roznyuk] 
Spartak Ivano-Frankovsk       0-2  BUKOVINA Chernovtsy 
  [Heintsch 65, Bronstein 70] 
ZVEZDA Kirovograd             1-0  Dinamo-2 Kiev 
  [Y.Panov 30]

===== Semifinals =====
[Apr 21] 
AVANGARD Ternopol             3-1  Dunayets Izmail 
  [V.Sekech-2, Kotyolkin – V.Sulima] 
BUKOVINA Chernovtsy           3-1  Zvezda Kirovograd 
  [Bronstein, Novak, Chorba – Y.Panov]

===== Final =====
[Apr 28] 
Avangard Ternopol             1-1  Bukovina Chernovtsy 
  [Kotyolkin – Voronyuk]

====== Replay ======
[Apr 29] 
AVANGARD Ternopol             3-0  Bukovina Chernovtsy 
  [Yurov, Maksimov, Serionov]

==== Group 3 (Ukraine) ====
===== Preliminary round =====
[Apr 4] 
Lokomotiv Donetsk             0-1  KHIMIK Severodonetsk         [aet] 
  [Tokarev]

===== First round =====
[Apr 4] 
Lokomotiv Kherson             0-0  Kommunarets Kommunarsk 
Shakhtyor Yenakiyevo          w/o  NISTRUL Bendery 
Spartak Melitopol             2-3  SHAKHTYOR Kadiyevka 
  [V.Kiselyov, Zabudskiy – Smirnov-2, Pugovkin] 
SUDOSTROITEL Nikolayev        1-0  Shakhtyor Gorlovka 
  [I.Pynzar 87] 
Tavria Simferopol             0-0  Torpedo Kharkov 
TRUBNIK Nikopol               4-1  Shakhtyor Torez 
  [A.Lobanov-2, A.Torbin, B.Lesik – Kolesnikov] 
[Apr 5] 
SKF Sevastopol                3-0  Avangard Kramatorsk 
  [Yeletskiy-2, Syromyatnikov] 
[Apr 7] 
KHIMIK Severodonetsk          1-0  Shakhtyor Krasny Luch 
  [Tokarev]

====== First round replays ======
[Apr 5] 
LOKOMOTIV Kherson             1-0  Kommunarets Kommunarsk 
  [Chernyshenko] 
TAVRIA Simferopol             2-0  Torpedo Kharkov 
  [Sukhanov, Kudryashov]

===== Quarterfinals =====
[Apr 14] 
KHIMIK Severodonetsk          1-0  Shakhtyor Kadiyevka 
  [Denisov] 
LOKOMOTIV Kherson             1-0  Trubnik Nikopol 
  [Chernyshenko] 
Sudostroitel Nikolayev        0-1  NISTRUL Bendery  
  [Rybakov] 
Tavria Simferopol             2-2  SKF Sevastopol 
  [Kotlyarenko, Yarovoi – Litvinov, Aleksandrov]

====== Quarterfinals replays ======
[Apr 15] 
TAVRIA Simferopol             4-2  SKF Sevastopol 
  [Skripka-2, V.Smirnov, Yarovoi – Nekhanov, Litvinov]

===== Semifinals =====
[Apr 21] 
Khimik Severodonetsk          0-2  LOKOMOTIV Kherson 
  [Chernyshenko, Levanchenko] 
TAVRIA Simferopol             3-2  Nistrul Bendery 
  [Yulygin, Mikhokhos, V.Smirnov – Gorbach, Pogrebnoi]

===== Final =====
[Apr 28] 
LOKOMOTIV Kherson             1-0  Tavria Simferopol 
  [Pshikov]

=== Final stage ===
==== Preliminary round ====
[Apr 28] 
DINAMO Leningrad              1-0  Daugava Riga 
LOKOMOTIV Tbilisi             1-0  Zarya Lugansk 
  [Koshkelov 88] 
LOKOMOTIV Vinnitsa            2-1  Energetik Dushanbe 
  [Bosy, Troyanovskiy - ?] 
MOLDOVA Kishinev              2-1  Terek Grozny                 [aet] 
SHAKHTYOR Karaganda           3-0  Avangard Kharkov 
  [Y.Yurkevich-2, V.Korolkov] 
SKA Novosibirsk               2-0  Traktor Volgograd 
SPARTAK Gomel                 1-0  Dinamo Tallinn 
  [V.Chuyeshkov 80] 
Stroitel Ashkhabad            0-1  KUBAN Krasnodar 
Volga Gorkiy                  0-2  ALGA Frunze

==== First round ====
[May 6] 
ALGA Frunze                   1-0  Trud Voronezh 
AVANGARD Ternopol             1-0  Žalgiris Vilnius
DESNA Chernigov               1-0  Shinnik Yaroslavl            [aet] 
DINAMO Leningrad              6-1  Dnepr Dnepropetrovsk 
  [? – Savelyev] 
Dinamo Sukhumi                0-0  Metallurg Zaporozhye 
Kuban Krasnodar               0-3  KAYRAT Alma-Ata 
LOKOMOTIV Kherson             3-2  Politotdel Tashkent Region   [aet] 
Lokomotiv Krasnoyarsk         0-1  SKA Novosibirsk 
  [G.Apukhtin] 
Lokomotiv Tbilisi             1-2  KARPATY Lvov 
LOKOMOTIV Vinnitsa            1-0  Lokomotiv Chelyabinsk 
  [Sprikut] 
Neftyanik Fergana             0-0  Spartak Gomel 
SHAKHTYOR Karaganda           1-0  Ararat Yerevan 
  [V.Korolkov 17] 
TEKMASH Kostroma              2-0  Moldova Kishinev 
  [Avdeyev, Chesnokov] 
Trudoviye Rezervy Kursk       0-0  UralMash Sverdlovsk 
ZNAMYA TRUDA Orekhovo-Zuyevo  2-1  RostSelMash Rostov-na-Donu 
  [? – Levchenko]

===== First round replays =====
[May 7] 
DINAMO Sukhumi                1-0  Metallurg Zaporozhye         [aet]
NEFTYANIK Fergana             1-0  Spartak Gomel 
  [Kuramshin] 
Trudoviye Rezervy Kursk       2-3  URALMASH Sverdlovsk 
  [Basalayev, ? – An.Morozov, V.Kapustin, ?]

==== Second round ====
[May 6] 
Torpedo Kutaisi               1-3  CSKA Moskva 
  [Igor Janshiyev – Nikolai Kashtanov, Kasimovskiy, Vitaliy Polyakov] 
[May 11] 
Alga Frunze                   0-1  KRYLYA SOVETOV Kuibyshev 
  [Anatoliy Kazakov] 
[May 13] 
Lokomotiv Kherson             0-1  DINAMO Minsk                 [aet] 
  [Eduard Malofeyev 112] 
[May 14] 
KAYRAT Alma-Ata               2-0  Chernomorets Odessa 
  [Anatoliy Chentsov 62, Timur Segizbayev 83] 
[May 15] 
Karpaty Lvov                  1-2  SHAKHTYOR Donetsk 
  [B.Keslo 81 – Viktor Zubkov 1 pen, Anatoliy Pilipchuk 67] 
ZNAMYA TRUDA Orekhovo-Zuyevo  3-2  Pahtakor Tashkent 
  [Polikanov-2, Zakharov – Stanislav Stadnik] 
[May 16] 
AVANGARD Ternopol             3-2  SKA Rostov-na-Donu 
  [Shevchuk 30, Kotyolkin 67, 88 – Ricardas Kucinskas 2, Oleg Kopayev 46] 
Lokomotiv Vinnitsa            0-2  LOKOMOTIV Moskva 
  [Alexandr Manshin 80, Valentin Bubukin 82] 
SKA Novosibirsk               2-1  Dinamo Kiev 
  [V.Ivanov 33, 59 – Viktor Serebryanikov 32] 
TEKMASH Kostroma              1-0  SKA Odessa                   [aet] 
  [Jemal Silagadze 101] 
[May 17] 
UralMash Sverdlovsk           0-1  SPARTAK Moskva 
  [A.Fedotov (U) 35 og] 
[May 19] 
DESNA Chernigov               1-0  Neftyanik Baku 
Neftyanik Fergana             0-2  DINAMO Moskva 
  [Gennadiy Gusarov 18, Igor Chislenko 33] 
SHAKHTYOR Karaganda           1-0  Torpedo Moskva 
  [V.Khrapovitskiy 32] 
[May 22] 
Dinamo Sukhumi                0-1  DINAMO Tbilisi 
  [Dzidziguri 17] 
[May 25] 
DINAMO Leningrad              2-1  Zenit Leningrad 
  [Gennadiy Yevryuzhikhin 2, 80 – Lev Burchalkin 82]

==== Third round ====
[May 27] 
DINAMO Minsk                  1-0  Shakhtyor Karaganda 
  [Leonard Adamov] 
[May 29] 
SHAKHTYOR Donetsk             2-1  SKA Novosibirsk              [aet] 
  [Anatoliy Rodin 95, Stanislav Yevseyenko 97 – Viktor Zubkov (Sh) ? og] 
[May 30] 
Tekmash Kostroma              1-3  ZNAMYA TRUDA Orekhovo-Zuyevo 
  [Chesnokov – Rybakov-2, Polikanov] 
[May 31] 
KAYRAT Alma-Ata               4-3  Desna Chernigov 
  [Alexandr Abayev, Oleg Maltsev, Sergei Kvochkin, A.Kuklev – Rozhanskiy-3] 
[Jun 1] 
Dinamo Moskva                 1-2  DINAMO Leningrad 
  [Georgiy Ryabov 53 – Lavrushchenko 48, Gennadiy Yevryuzhikhin 77] 
KRYLYA SOVETOV Kuibyshev      2-1  Avangard Ternopol 
  [Anatoliy Kazakov, Anatoliy Zhukov – Yurov] 
[Jun 2] 
SPARTAK Moskva                3-2  Lokomotiv Moskva 
  [Yuriy Sevidov 34, 59, Galimzyan Husainov 62 – Vladimir Bystrov 40, Boris Belyakov 65] 
[Jun 9] 
CSKA Moskva                   2-4  DINAMO Tbilisi 
  [Boris Kazakov, Boris Sichinava (D) og – Slava Metreveli-2, Ilya Datunashvili, Vladimir Barkaia]

==== Quarterfinals ====
[Jun 9] 
Shakhtyor Donetsk             0-2  DINAMO Minsk 
  [Mikhail Mustygin 66, 76] 
SPARTAK Moskva                2-1  Kayrat Alma-Ata 
  [Valeriy Reingold 5, Vladimir Yanishevskiy 19 - Alexandr Abayev 34] 
[Jun 17] 
DINAMO Tbilisi                2-1  Znamya Truda Orekhovo-Zuyevo [aet] 
  [Slava Metreveli 23, Vladimir Barkaia 96 – V.Skupov ?] 
[Jul 4] 
KRYLYA SOVETOV Kuibyshev      3-1  Dinamo Leningrad 
  [Anatoliy Kazakov 2, Boris Kokh 58, Boris Valkov 61 – Vladimir Voinov 47]

==== Semifinals ====
[Jul 31, Moskva] 
DINAMO Minsk                  2-1  Dinamo Tbilisi 
  [Yuriy Pogalnikov 6, Leonard Adamov 67 – Vladimir Barkaia 53] 
[Aug 2] 
SPARTAK Moskva                4-2  Krylya Sovetov Kuibyshev 
  [Yuriy Sevidov 2 pen, Valeriy Reingold 24, Vladimir Yanishevskiy 32, Galimzyan Husainov 59 – Anatoliy Kazakov 51, Anatoliy Zhukov 70]

==== Final ====
14 August 1965

Spartak Moscow	0 – 0	Dinamo Minsk
	[ Report]

Moscow

===== Replay =====
15 August 1965

Spartak Moscow	2 – 1 (a.e.t.)	Dinamo Minsk
Husainov 68', 100'	[ Report]	Arzamastsev 3'

Moscow
