= Viktor Andrukhiv =

Ukrainian football executive

- Віктор Андрухів

Member of the Executive Committee of the Ukrainian Association of Football
- Incumbent
- Assumed office 2017
- President: Andriy Pavelko

Personal details
- Born: Viktor Vasylyovych Andrukhiv; July 8, 1988 (age 38) Vyshneve, Kyiv Oblast, Ukrainian SSR
- Education: Dnipro Polytechnic; Dnipro Humanitarian University
- Occupation: football executive, entrepreneur, social activist
- Known for: head of the Football Federation of the Dnipropetrovsk Oblast

Viktor Vasiliovych Andrukhiv (Ukrainian: Віктор Васильович Андрухів; born 8 July 1988) is a Ukrainian entrepreneur, football executive, and activist. He is a member of the executive committee of the Ukrainian Association of Football and head of the Football Federation of the Dnipropetrovsk Oblast.

== Early life ==
Viktor Andrukhiv was born in Vyshneve, Kyiv Oblast, Ukraine.

In 2005, he graduated from Lyceum No. 100, Dnipro.

In 2009, he graduated from the National Mining University (Dnipro) majoring in “Economics and Entrepreneurship” with a bachelor's degree in accounting and auditing. In 2010, he graduated from the National Mining University (Dnipro) majoring in “Finance” with a master's degree in finance.

In 2021, he graduated from the private higher educational institution “Dnipro Humanitarian University”, obtained the qualification: bachelor's degree in the field of knowledge “Law”.

== Career ==
Since 2006, Viktor Andrukhiv is an entrepreneur, founder and co-founder of several production companies. The founder of the companies Sylayt Hrup, Savex Minerals and Leader. Sylayt Hrup is one of the largest large enterprises in Ukraine, which specializes in the production of polypropylene fiber and polymer threads. Also, he is active in social activities.

From 2014–2016, he was the head of the public organization “Football Federation in the City of Dnipro”.

Since 2016, he heads the Football Federation of the Dnipropetrovsk Oblast.

Since 2017, he has been a member of the executive committee of the Ukrainian Association of Football.

Viktor Andrukhiv also holds the position of Chairman of the Futsal Association of the Dnipropetrovsk Oblast and he is the Chairman of the Beach Football Federation of the Dnipropetrovsk Oblast.

He is a member of the Board, Young Business Club - YBC, and Lead Business Club business communities.

== Awards ==
- 2021 — Jubilee medal “For significant contribution to the development of Ukrainian football”;
- 2022 — Certificate for a significant personal contribution to the development and popularization of physical culture and sports in the Dnipropetrovsk Oblast, conscientious selfless work, high professionalism and on the occasion of the Day of Physical Culture and Sports of Ukraine.

== Personal life ==
He is married, raising two daughters.
