= Mykola Fominykh =

Soviet football coach and administrator (1927–1996)

Personal information
- Full name: Mykola Fedorovych Fominykh
- Date of birth: 1927
- Place of birth: Kyiv, Kyiv Okruha, Soviet Union
- Date of death: 1996 (aged 68–69)
- Place of death: Kyiv, Ukraine

Managerial career
- Years: Team
- 1955–1957: FSM Kyiv
- 1957–1963: Dynamo School
- 1964–1970: SKA Kiev
- 1971–1972: Kryvbas Kryvyi Rih

Mykola Fedorovych Fominykh (Николай Фёдорович Фоминых, 1927–1996) was a Soviet football coach and football administrator. He is a Merited Coach of the USSR.

From 1975 to 1989 he was a chief of the Football Department of the Sports Committee of Ukrainian SSR. In interview to Ukrayinskyi Futbol newspaper answering questions about rumors that Fominykh knew nothing about football, the former secretary of Football Federation of the Ukrainian SSR Klavdia Kirianova said that it is not true, but he did indeed know more about ice hockey and even won the Soviet hockey competitions with Dynamo Kyiv junior team. Kirianova admitted that Fominykh was not as good specialist as Oleg Oshenkov, but in her opinion he still was a good leader and well oriented in the field of football administration.

Preceded by Yuriy Pustovarov	Presidents of FFU; 1989–1991	Succeeded by Viktor Bannikov
Preceded by Oleh Oshenkov	Presidents of FFU; 1975–1987	Succeeded by Yuriy Pustovarov
