= Viktor Bannikov =

Ukrainian footballer (1938–2001)

Personal information
- Full name: Viktor Maksymovych Bannikov
- Date of birth: 28 April 1938
- Place of birth: Luhyny, Ukrainian SSR
- Date of death: 25 April 2001 (aged 62)
- Place of death: Kyiv, Ukraine
- Height: 1.79 m (5 ft 10 in)
- Position: Goalkeeper

Senior career*
| Years | Team | Apps | (Gls) |
| 1959 | Avanhard Zhytomyr | 22 | (0) |
| 1960 | Avanhard Chernihiv | 19 | (0) |
| 1960–1961 | Desna Chernihiv | 33 | (0) |
| 1961–1969 | Dynamo Kyiv | 151 | (0) |
| 1970–1973 | Torpedo Moscow | 107 | (0) |
| Total | | 258 | (0) |

International career
| 1964–1972 | USSR | 14 | (0) |

Managerial career
- 1976: FC Zorya Luhansk (team's director)
- 1977–1978: Spartak Zhytomyr
Medal record
Men's football
Representing Soviet Union
FIFA World Cup
| Bronze medal – third place | 1966 England |
UEFA European Championship
| Silver medal – second place | 1972 Belgium |
- * Club domestic league appearances and goals

Viktor Maksymovych Bannikov (Ukrainian: Віктор Максимович Банніков, Russian: Ви́ктор Макси́мович Ба́нников; 28 April 1938 – 25 April 2001) was a Ukrainian football official and a Soviet player. He was considered one of the best goalkeepers in the Soviet Union earning the title of the best twice in 1964 and 1970. Bannikov had 138 clean sheets earning him a place in the symbolic Lev Yashin club. Distinguished Master of Sport of USSR (1991). He died on the 25 April 2001 and he has buried at the Baikove Cemetery in Baikova St, 6, Kyiv, Ukraine, where also Valeriy Lobanovskyi was buried.

== Playing career ==
=== Club ===
Bannikov was born in one of the villages in Zhytomyrschyna, Ukrainian SSR, to ethnic Russian parents. He started his career with Avanhard Zhytomyr. In 1959 Lev Misozhnik, the coach of the local Avanhard Chernihiv football team, was fascinated Victor so much that he gladly agreed to try himself in a new capacity. Finally make a decision in favor of football, according to Viktor Bannikov, he was forced by purely mundane considerations. He made his debut at the age of 20 in the Soviet Second League, an impressive achievement considering many teams still preferred an experienced pair of hands between the sticks. In the mean time the team changed the name to Desna Chernihiv. In 1961 he moved to Kyiv where he spent 8 years of his playing career for Dynamo. During this time he was considered one of the best players, and together with Dynamo he won the championships in 1967 and 1968. Also he was the member of the Soviet national team that took fourth place at the 1966 FIFA World Cup. As the member of the Kyivan club he also was the holder of the Soviet Cup in 1964 and 1966. In 1968, he made a record that never was broken in the Soviet football by goalkeeping for 1122 minutes without conceding a single goal. In 1972 now with Torpedo Moscow he also won the Soviet Cup competition.

=== International ===
In his 14 international representations for his country, he allowed 13 goals and won only six of them. Over his international career, Bannikov served as a back-up goalkeeper for such footballers like Lev Yashin and Anzor Kavazashvili.

His first game for USSR national team was on 29 November 1964 against Bulgaria which was tied at nil. The national team went on a brief tour in Balkans playing against Yugoslavia and Bulgaria. The game against Bulgaria was the last official match for the Soviet team in 1964.

The most disastrous game came against Sweden in 1972 where he allowed three(!) goals and was substituted. The game was tied at four, and it was his last game on the international level. Having a great career at the club level, his international record was kind of shaky. His best game for the national team was against Wales at home grounds in 1965 (2–1 win). Bannikov lost only a single game when the national team yielded to Brazil at home in 1965 (0–3).

== Career statistics ==
=== Club ===
Appearances and goals by club, season and competition
| Club | Season | League | | Cup | | Europe | | Total | |
| Club | Season | Apps | GA | Apps | GA | Apps | GA | Apps | GA |
|---|---|---|---|---|---|---|---|---|---|
| Avanhard Zhytomyr | 1959 | 22 | ? | 2 | 3 | — | | 24 | ? |
| Avanhard Chernihiv | 1960 | 19 | ? | — | | — | | 19 | ? |
| Desna Chernihiv | 1961 | 33 | ? | 3 | 4 | — | | 36 | ? |
| Dynamo Kyiv | 1962 | 9 | 9 | — | | — | | 9 | 9 |
| Dynamo Kyiv | 1963 | 34 | 39 | — | | — | | 34 | 39 |
| Dynamo Kyiv | 1964 | 28 | 25 | 6 | 3 | — | | 34 | 28 |
| Dynamo Kyiv | 1965 | 29 | 20 | — | | 4 (Note: the 1965–66 European Cup Winners' Cup season) | 2 | 33 | 20 |
| Dynamo Kyiv | 1966 | 7 | 7 | 3 | 1 | 2 | 4 | 12 | 12 |
| Dynamo Kyiv | 1967 | 22 | 5 | — | | 3 (Note: the 1967–68 European Cup season) | 4 | 25 | 9 |
| Dynamo Kyiv | 1968 | 19 | 14 | 1 | 0 | — | | 20 | 14 |
| Dynamo Kyiv | 1969 | 3 | 3 | — | | — | | 3 | 3 |
| Torpedo Moscow | 1970 | 29 | 29 | 5 | 3 | — | | 34 | 32 |
| Torpedo Moscow | 1971 | 29 | 24 | 6 | 3 | — | | 35 | 27 |
| Torpedo Moscow | 1972 | 29 | 31 | 10 | 3 | — | | 39 | 34 |
| Torpedo Moscow | 1973 | 20 | 23 | 2 | 1 | — | | 22 | 24 |
| 12 seasons in Class A/Vysshaya Liga | | 258 | 229 | 38 | 21 | 9 | 8 | 305 | 258 |

Notes:

- The table includes league and cup competitions of the All-Union level (Class A and Class B). It does not include competitions of republican level.
- The 12 seasons totals include all games at the top tier, Soviet Cup, and European competitions.

=== International ===
Appearances and goals by national team and year
| National team | Year | Apps | Goals |
|---|---|---|---|
| Soviet Union | 1964 | 1 | 0 |
| Soviet Union | 1965 | 4 | 0 |
| Soviet Union | 1966 | 2 | 0 |
| Soviet Union | 1970 | 2 | 0 |
| Soviet Union | 1971 | 3 | 0 |
| Soviet Union | 1972 | 1 | 0 |
| Total | | 13 | 0 |

== Professional career and awards ==
During his playing career, five times he was named to the symbolic dream team (33 of the best) which was picked on an annual basis. At the end of the 1970s he was on the coaching positions for couple of Ukrainian teams. In 1963, he earned the distinguished master of sport of USSR award. He held a title of a distinguished coach of the Ukrainian SSR.

He had initiated the first official match for the Ukraine national football team. He had been awarded the Ruby Order of UEFA "For service". He dedicated his whole life to football and particularly to the development of the Ukrainian football.

=== Football functionary ===
From 1991 to 1996 he was elected as the president of the Football Federation of Ukraine and until 2001 he stayed there as the vice-president.

== Personal life ==
In his interview to the Soviet sports magazine "Futbol-Khokey" in 1970, Bannikov told that he lost his father early in life who perished in the war. He also said that with his mother they returned to Zhytomyr in 1946 when he was 8. As a teenager he had to work at a shoe factory, while attending school. About his sports interest, at first Bannikov was involved in track and field, particularly the high jump being able to clear 195 m (640 ft) height. He also participated in basketball and volleyball. As a basketballer, Bannikov received the GTO 1st Class achievement award (Ready for Labour and Defence of the USSR).

To football Bannikov arrived by random occurrence when some passerby who introduced himself as Lev Misiozhnik invited him to a factory team that he was managing in the position of a goalkeeper. And at the age of 20, Bannikov entered the realm of association football. Following his first game for a factory team he ended up in a hospital receiving concussion during his collision with a forward.

== Honours ==
Dynamo Kyiv

- Soviet Top League: 1966, 1967, 1968
- Soviet Cup: 1964, 1965–66

Torpedo Moscow

- Soviet Cup: 1972

USSR national football team

- UEFA European Championship: Runner-up 1972

Individual

- Ukrainian Footballer of the Year: 1964

== Tributes ==
- The football stadium located close to the House of Football and the Olympic Stadium in Kyiv, was named Bannikov Stadium.
- In 1998 the Viktor Bannikov Memorial Tournament was created and received international status and was contested by 16 junior teams.

| Preceded by Mykola Fominykh (as the president of Football Federation of Ukrainian SSR) | Presidents of FFU; 1991–1996 | Succeeded by Valeriy Pustovoitenko |
