= Serhiy Storozhenko =

Ukrainian jurist and football functionary

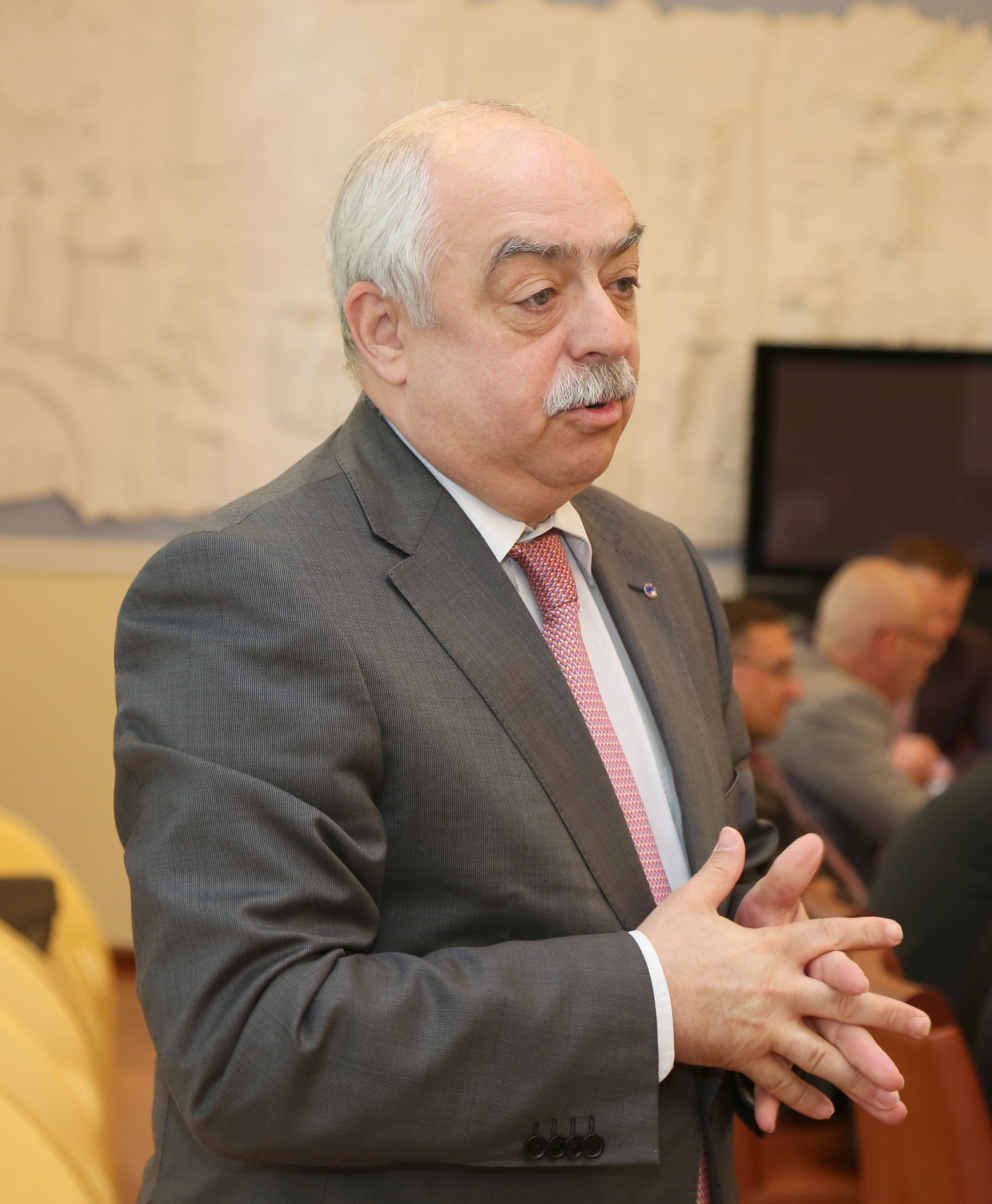
Serhiy Storozhenko

Serhiy Storozhenko (Ukrainian: Сергій Михайлович Стороженко) is a Ukrainian jurist and football functionary. He is a former first vice-president of the Football Federation of Ukraine and president of the Kharkiv Oblast Football Federation (1996-2000).

On 13 November 2013 Storozhenko signed a resignation letter as an official of the Football Federation of Ukraine. Storozhenko held the post of the first vice-president of the Football Federation since September of 2000.
