= FFU Committee of Referees =

Ukrainian sporting body

FFU Committee of Referees (Ukrainian: Комітет арбітрів ФФУ) is a permanent committee of the Football Federation of Ukraine (FFU). The committee was created to improve an instructional framework and professional level of refereeing and inspecting of football competitions in accordance with standards and requirements of FIFA and UEFA. The committee is financed through the Football Federation of Ukraine and its activity can be ceased on the decision of the Executive Committee of FFU. The committee supervises activity of all referees in football males and females.

== Composition ==
The composition of the FFU Committee of Referees is complex. The committee consists of a chairman, an assistant chairman, and members of the committee. Aside of the committee chairman there also is a curator of refereeing who also has its own assistant. The curator is approved by the Executive Committee on proposition of the president of FFU, while the chairman of the committee of referees is appointed by the Executive committee on proposition of the curator. Other members of the committee of referees are appointed by the president of FFU on proposition of both the curator and the chairman. The curator approves the committee's work plan and functional responsibilities of its members.

== Commissions ==
- Commission on preparation, control and attestation of referees
- Commission on preparation, control and attestation of referees assistants
- Commission on preparation, control and attestation of inspectors
- Commission on preparation, control and attestation of instructors of referees, referees assistants, and inspectors
- Commission on preparation and control of physical conditions of referees and referees assistants

== Referee categories ==
Beside the international FIFA category there is a national category for referees in Ukraine.

- National category
- I category
- II category
- III category

== Committee's chairmen ==
- Vasyl Melnychuk
- 20 June 2008 - 21 August 2011 Vadym Shevchenko
- March 2003 - 20 June 2008 Viktor Derdo
- Serhiy Tatulian
