= 1978 FIFA World Cup qualification – UEFA Group 9 =

Football tournament qualification stage

Group 9 consisted of three of the 32 teams entered into the European zone: Greece, Hungary, and Soviet Union. These three teams competed on a home-and-away basis for the half spot of the 8.5 spots assigned to UEFA in the final tournament. The European spot in the UEFA - CONMEBOL would be assigned to the group's winner.

Hungary would go on to win the World Cup spot in that qualifier.

== Standings ==
Pos	Team	Pld	W	D	L	GF	GA	GD	Pts
1	Hungary	4	2	1	1	6	4	+2	5
2	Soviet Union	4	2	0	2	5	3	+2	4
3	Greece	4	1	1	2	2	6	−4	3

== Matches ==
9 October 1976

Greece	1 – 1	Hungary
Papaioannou 68'	Report	Kereki 84'

Karaiskakis Stadium, Piraeus, Greece
Referee: Wöhrer (Austria)

24 April 1977

Soviet Union	2 – 0	Greece
Konkov 26'; Kipiani 77'	Report

Referee: Dubach (Switzerland)

30 April 1977

Hungary	2 – 1	Soviet Union
Nyilasi 44'; Kereki 67'	Report	Kipiani 88'

Referee: Aldinger (West Germany)

10 May 1977

Greece	1 – 0	Soviet Union
Papaioannou 58'	Report

Referee: Gussoni (Italy)

18 May 1977

Soviet Union	2 – 0	Hungary
Burjak 3'; Bálint 14' (o.g.)	Report

Referee: Taylor (England)

28 May 1977

Hungary	3 – 0	Greece
Pusztai 13'; Nyilasi 15'; Fazekas 88'	Report

Referee: Beck (Netherlands)
