= Viktor Bannikov Memorial Tournament =

Annual football tournament in Ukraine

- Founded: 1998 (reorganized in 2002)
- Region: Ukraine (UEFA)
- Teams: 8
- Current champions: Ukraine U-16
- Most championships: Ukraine U-16 (5 titles)

The Viktor Bannikov Memorial Tournament (Ukrainian: Міжнародний турнір пам’яті Віктора Баннікова) is an annual summer association football friendly competition for junior teams that has taken place in various cities of Ukraine since 1998. The tournament was created in honour and memory of the legendary goalkeeper of the USSR national football team and the first president of the Football Federation of Ukraine Viktor Bannikov (1938–2001). The tournament was initially established in 1998 as a competition for junior teams of Ukrainian football clubs. Viktor Bannikov opened his first edition. It was contested by 12 teams. DFK "ATEK" won defeating opponents from FC Dynamo Kyiv. In 1999, the tournament has received international status and was contested by 16 junior teams. In 2002, the Ukrainian football federation has decided to give more importance professional status, inviting the participation of junior national teams.

The tournament recently gained FIFA recognition and support.

== General rules ==
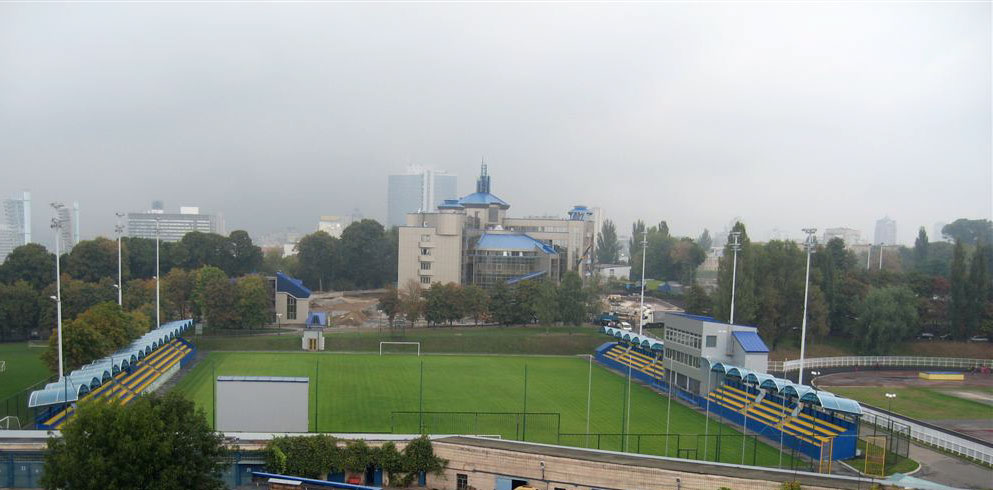
Bannikov Stadium in Kyiv

Since 2002, the tournament participants are a two group of four selected under-17 national teams. From 2005 the tournament participants have been the under-16 national teams. The winners of group play in the final, the second place teams play match for the 3rd place, the third team in group play match for 5th place, the fourth team in the group play match for 7th place.

The games of the tournament were played at stadiums in Kyiv and towns in Kyiv Oblast: Boryspil, Makariv, Obukhiv, Borodianka.

In 2008 the games of the U-16 international tournament were played at stadiums in Donetsk and Mariupol.

== Champions ==
Season	Champion	Runner-up	3rd Position	4th Position
2002	Poland U-17	Russia U-17	Ukraine U-17	Belarus U-17
2003	Ukraine U-17	Slovakia U-17	Turkey U-17	Russia U-17
2004	Turkey U-17	Ukraine U-17	Slovakia U-17	Czech Republic U-17
2005	Ukraine U-16	Turkey U-16	Russia U-16	Belgium U-16
2006	Ukraine U-16	Poland U-16	Italy U-16	Turkey U-16
2007	Turkey U-16	Ukraine U-16	Slovakia U-16	United States U-16
2008	Italy U-16	Poland U-16	Japan U-16	Russia U-16
2009	Serbia U-16	Turkey U-16	Ukraine U-16	Poland U-16
2010	Czech Republic U-16	Serbia U-16	Ukraine U-16	Turkey U-16
2011	Ukraine U-16	Russia U-16	Serbia U-16	Turkey U-16
2012	Ukraine U-16	Russia U-16	Turkey U-16	Serbia U-16
2013	Turkey U-16	Russia U-16	Ukraine U-16	Serbia U-16
2014	Not held			
2015	Not held			
2016	(Georgia (country)) Georgia U-16	Israel U-16	Serbia U-16	Latvia U-16
2017	(Georgia (country)) Georgia U-17	Israel U-17	Ukraine U-17	Slovakia U-17
2018	Ukraine U-17	Turkey U-17	Slovakia U-17	Belarus U-17
