= Veniamin Arzamastsev =

Belarusian footballer and manager

Personal information
- Full name: Veniamin Vladimirovich Arzamastsev
- Date of birth: 1 August 1937 (age 89)
- Place of birth: Kazakevichevo, Far Eastern Krai, Russian SFSR
- Height: 1.72 m (5 ft 8 in)
- Position: Midfielder

Youth career
- 1955–1958: GIFK Smolensk

Senior career*
Years	Team	Apps	(Gls)
1959–1962	Spartak Smolensk		
1963–1969	Dinamo Minsk	216	(10)
1959	Selenga Ulan-Ude	41	(0)
1960	Gomselmash	88	(5)

Managerial career
- 1974–1977: Dinamo Minsk (academy)
- 1980–1983: Dinamo Minsk (assistant)
- 1983–1986: Dinamo Minsk
- 1988–1991: JS Bordj Ménaïel
- 1992–1994: Dinamo Minsk (assistant)
- 1992–1996: Belarus (assistant)
- 1994: Dinamo Minsk
- 1994–1998: Dinamo-93 Minsk (assistant)
- 1997–1999: Belarus (assistant)
- 1998: Dinamo Minsk
- 1999: Dinamo Minsk (assistant)
- 2002: Dinamo Minsk (assistant)
- 2002: Dinamo Minsk (caretaker)
- 2002–2003: Dinamo Minsk (assistant)
- 2003–2005: Smena Minsk (coach)
- 2005–2012: Minsk (youth)
- * Club domestic league appearances and goals

Veniamin Vladimirovich Arzamastsev (Russian: Вениамин Арзамасцев; born 1 August 1937) is a Belarusian football manager and footballer who last managed Dinamo Minsk.

== Career ==
Arzamastsev has been regarded as an important member of the Dinamo Minsk manager staff during the 1980s to 2000s.
