= 1972 Soviet Cup =

1972 Cup of USSR in Football
Кубок СССР

Tournament details
- Country: Soviet Union
- Dates: February 20 – August 13
- Teams: 36

Final positions
- Champions: Torpedo Moscow
- Runners-up: Spartak Moscow

The 1972 Soviet Cup was an association football cup competition of the Soviet Union. The winner of the competition, Torpedo Moscow qualified for the continental tournament.

== Participating teams ==
Enter in First round		Enter in Qualification round
Vysshaya Liga 16/16 teams	Pervaya Liga 12/20 teams	Pervaya Liga 8/20 teams
✓ Zaria Voroshilovgrad; ✓ Dinamo Kiev; ✓ Dinamo Tbilisi; ✓ Ararat Yerevan; ✓ CSKA Moscow; ✓ Dnepr Dnepropetrovsk; ✓ Zenit Leningrad; ✓ Dinamo Minsk; ✓ Torpedo Moscow; ✓ Dinamo Moscow; ✓ Spartak Moscow; ✓ SKA Rostov-na-Donu; ✓ Kairat Alma-Ata; ✓ Karpaty Lvov; ✓ Lokomotiv Moscow; ✓ Neftchi Baku	✓ Pakhtakor Tashkent; ✓ Shakhter Donetsk; ✓ Chernomorets Odessa; ✓ Krylya Sovetov Kuibyshev; ✓ Torpedo Kutaisi; ✓ Spartak Ordzhonikidze; ✓ Shakhter Karaganda; ✓ Tekstilschik Ivanovo; ✓ Metallurg Zaporozhye; ✓ Metallist Kharkov; ✓ Uralmash Sverdlovsk; ✓ Dinamo Leningrad	✓ Stroitel Ashkhabad; ✓ Shinnik Yaroslavl; ✓ Pamir Dushanbe; ✓ Alga Frunze; ✓ Nistru Kishinev; ✓ Zvezda Perm; ✓ Avtomobilist Nalchik; ✓ Krivbass Krivoi Rog

Source: []

== Competition schedule ==
=== Preliminary round ===
[Feb 21, 25] 
ALGA Frunze                1-0  1-0  Stroitel Ashkhabad 
Krivbass Krivoi Rog        1-2  1-3  AVTOMOBILIST Nalchik 
PAMIR Dushanbe             2-1  1-0  Nistru Kishinev 
SHINNIK Yaroslavl          4-1  0-0  Zvezda Perm

=== First round ===
[Feb 26, Mar 5] 
TORPEDO Moskva             2-1  1-0  Torpedo Kutaisi         [both legs in Sochi] 
  [1. Viktor Filippov, Vadim Nikonov – Shota Okropirashvili. Att: 4,000] 
  [2. Yuriy Smirnov 20. Att: 6,000] 
[Feb 28, Mar 3] 
DINAMO Moskva              3-1  0-0  Shakhtyor Donetsk 
  [1. Anatoliy Kozhemyakin 25, Andrei Yakubik 60, Anatoliy Baidachny 79 – Yuriy Gubich 88. Att: 8,000 (in Sochi)] 
  [2. Att: 20,000] 
[Feb 28, Mar 4] 
Dinamo Minsk               1-1  0-1  SHAKHTYOR Karaganda 
  [1. Eduard Malofeyev 85 pen – Anatoliy Novikov 65. Att: 8,000 (in Sukhumi)] 
  [2. Anatoliy Novikov 36. Att: 20,000] 
[Feb 29, Mar 4] 
KARPATY Lvov               1-0  3-1  Pamir Dushanbe 
  [1. Eduard Kozinkevich 78. Att: 30,000] 
  [2. ? - Rudik Yegiazaryan] 
Neftchi Baku               1-0  0-3  METALLURG Zaporozhye 
Shinnik Yaroslavl          0-1  w/o  KAYRAT Alma-Ata 
  [1. Nikolai Osyanin 64] 
SKA Rostov-na-Donu         0-0  1-0  Avtomobilist Nalchik 
  [1. (in Adler)] 
  [2. Viktor Churkin 15] 
SPARTAK Moskva             5-1  0-0  UralMash Sverdlovsk     [both legs in Sochi] 
  [1. Viktor Papayev 6, Gennadiy Logofet 11, ?, Vladimir Redin ?, Vyacheslav Yegorovich 67 – Alexandr Zhuravlyov ?. Att: 5,000] 
  [2. Att: 3,000] 
Zarya Voroshilovgrad       0-0  0-0  CHERNOMORETS Odessa     [pen 3-5] 
  [1. Att: 5,000 (in Sukhumi)] 
  [2. Att: 15,000] 
[Mar 1, 5] 
Ararat Yerevan             0-2  1-0  DINAMO Leningrad 
DINAMO Kiev                2-1  1-1  Textilshchik Ivanovo    [both legs in Sochi]
  [1. Vitaliy Shevchenko 62, Vladimir Veremeyev 87 pen – Mikhail Potapov 86. Att: 3,000] 
  [2. Vitaliy Shevchenko 42 – Stanislav Lyubavin 22 pen. Att: 4,500] 
[Mar 1, 7] 
Alga Frunze                0-1  0-4  ZENIT Leningrad 
  [1. Georgiy Vyun 33. Att: 2,000 (in Hosta)] 
  [2. Georgiy Khromchenkov 6, Mikhail Fokin 34, Boris Kokh 38, Vyacheslav Bulavin 55. Att: 100 (in Sochi)] 
[Mar 2, 6] 
CSKA Moskva                1-0  1-1  Avtomobilist Orjonikidze 
  [1. Vladimir Dudarenko 35. (in Sochi)] 
  [2. Vladimir Polikarpov – Vladimir Titov] 
DNEPR Dnepropetrovsk       2-1  2-3  Pahtakor Tashkent 
  [1. Viktor Romanyuk-2 – Berador Abduraimov] 
  [2. Viktor Nazarov, ? (P) og - Berador Abduraimov, Tulyagan Isakov, Bohadyr Ibragimov] 
[Mar 4, 8] 
Metallist Kharkov          2-0  1-4  DINAMO Tbilisi 
  [1. Anatoliy Ignatenko 77, Zorbeg Ebralidze (D) 81 og] 
  [2. Levan Nodia 3, 44, 71 pen, Georgiy Gavasheli 89 – Vladimir Chaplygin 9] 
[Mar 4, 12] 
LOKOMOTIV Moskva           1-1  3-0  Krylya Sovetov Kuibyshev 
  [1. Yuriy Chesnokov 57 – Ravil Aryapov 90. Att: 1,500 (in Hosta)] 
  [2. Nikolai Zudin ?, Yuriy Chesnokov ?, Nikolai Timofeyev 89. (in Sochi)]

=== Second round ===
[Mar 11, 15] 
ZENIT Leningrad            2-0  2-0  Dinamo Leningrad 
  [1. Boris Kokh 22, Pavel Sadyrin 44 pen. Att: 2,000 (in Sochi)] 
  [2. Pavel Sadyrin 63 pen, Vladimir Ivanov 83. Att: 1,000 (in Gagra)] 
[Mar 11, 16] 
SPARTAK Moskva             1-0  1-2  Metallurg Zaporozhye 
  [1. Galimzyan Husainov 48. Att: 5,000 (in Sochi)] 
  [2. Nikolai Kiselyov 80 – Oleg Novikov 5, Viktor Kutin 55. Att: 20,000] 
[Mar 12, 15] 
TORPEDO Moskva             2-0  1-0  Dnepr Dnepropetrovsk 
  [1. Alexandr Grebnev 5, Yuriy Smirnov 44. Att: 5,000 (in Sochi)] 
  [2. Yuriy Smirnov 3. Att: 30,000] 
[Mar 12, 16] 
Chernomorets Odessa        1-0  0-3  KARPATY Lvov 
  [1. Sergei Zvenigorodskiy 86. Att: 10,000] 
  [2. Roman Khizhak 47, Bogdan Greshchak 56, Eduard Kozinkevich 64. Att: 32,000] 
Dinamo Kiev                1-0  0-1  SKA Rostov-na-Donu      [pen 8-9] 
  [1. Vladimir Muntyan 30 pen. Att: 15,000 (in Simferopol)] 
  [2. Anzor Chikhladze 30. Att: 26,000] 
DINAMO Tbilisi             3-0  0-0  Shakhtyor Karaganda 
  [1. Givi Nodia 9, 31, 65] 
  [2. Att: 10,000] 
[Mar 13, 17] 
CSKA Moskva                1-0  0-0  Dinamo Moskva 
  [1. Vladimir Zhigunov 88. Att: 5,500 (in Sochi)] 
  [2. Att: 25,000 (in Tashkent)] 
[Mar 15, 18] 
Kayrat Alma-Ata            1-1  1-2  LOKOMOTIV Moskva 
  [1. Nikolai Osyanin 16 – Nikolai Timofeyev 13. Att: 2,000 (in Sochi)] 
  [2. Vladislav Markin 88 – Viktor Davydov 17, Valentin Spiridonov 84. Att: 1,800 (in Hosta)]

=== Quarterfinals ===
[Mar 21, 25] 
KARPATY Lvov               0-0  1-1  Dinamo Tbilisi 
  [1. Att: 32,000] 
  [2. Lev Brovarskiy 66 – Givi Nodia 50. Att: 50,000] 
SKA Rostov-na-Donu         1-1  0-3  CSKA Moskva 
  [1. Viktor Churkin 36 – Vladimir Dorofeyev 58. Att: 30,000] 
  [2. Boris Kopeikin 5, 29, 58. Att: 7,000 (in Sochi)] 
TORPEDO Moskva             0-0  2-0  Zenit Leningrad         [both legs in Sochi]
  [1. Att: 5,000] 
  [2. Yuriy Smirnov 36, 80. Att: 7,000] 
[Mar 22, 25] 
SPARTAK Moskva             2-1  2-1  Lokomotiv Moskva 
  [1. Viktor Papayev 70, Vasiliy Kalinov 87 – Nikolai Zudin 52. Att: 4,000 (in Sochi)] 
  [2. Vyacheslav Yegorovich 40, 53 – Anatoliy Kozlov 8. Att: 1,500 (in Hosta)]

=== Semifinals ===
[Jul 2, 28] 
SPARTAK Moskva             2-0  2-0  Karpaty Lvov 
  [1. Alexandr Piskaryov 40, Galimzyan Husainov 50. Att: 55,000] 
  [2. Mikhail Bulgakov 41, Valeriy Andreyev 56. Att: 25,000] 
TORPEDO Moskva             0-0  4-1  CSKA Moskva 
  [2. Anatoliy Degtyaryov 16, 22, 44, Anatoliy Fetisov ? – Vladimir Polikarpov 31]

==== Final ====
12 August 1972

Torpedo Moscow	0 – 0	Spartak Moscow
	Report

Lenin's Central Stadium, Moscow
Attendance: 102,000
Referee: I. Lukyanov (Moscow)
13 August 1972

Torpedo Moscow	1 – 1	Spartak Moscow
Nikonov 5'	Report	Papayev 9'
Penalties
	5–1

Lenin's Central Stadium, Moscow
Attendance: 35,000
Referee: I. Lukyanov (Moscow)
