= Andriy Pavelko =

Ukrainian politician

- Андрій Павелко
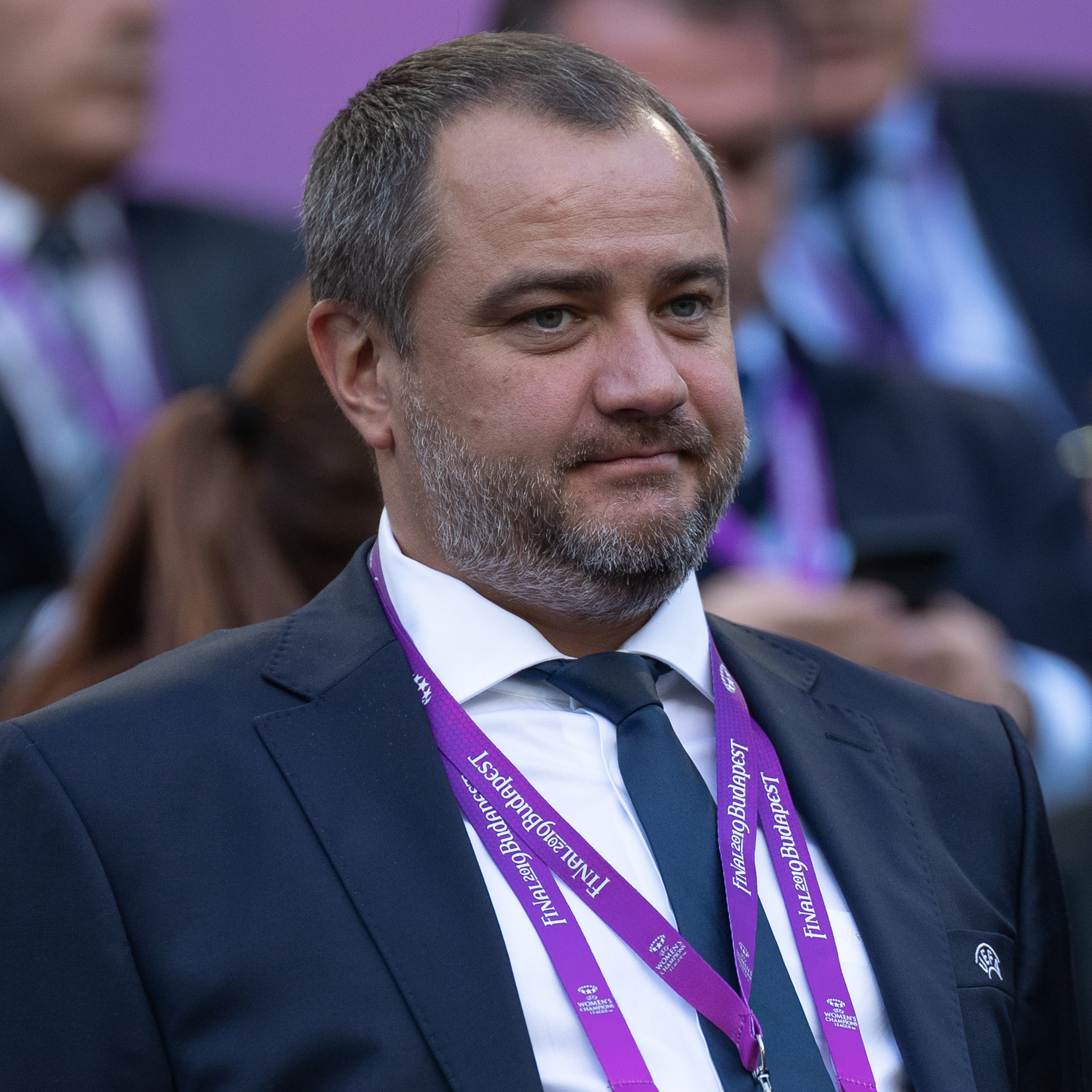
- Pavelko in 2019

People's Deputy of Ukraine

7th convocation
- In office 12 December 2012 – 22 October 2013
- Constituency: Batkivshchyna, No.29

8th convocation
- In office 27 November 2014 – 29 August 2019
- Constituency: Petro Poroshenko Bloc, No.33

Personal details
- Born: 7 October 1975 (age 50) Dnipropetrovsk, Ukrainian SSR, USSR

Andriy Vasylyovych Pavelko (Ukrainian: Андрій Васильович Павелко; born 7 October 1975) is a Ukrainian politician and sports official.

On 6 March 2015, he was elected as president of the Football Federation of Ukraine, replacing Anatoliy Konkov. Pavelko had been the acting president since 23 January 2015. In May 2019, he changed the federation's name to Ukrainian Association of Football (UAF).

== Political career ==
Following the 2010 Ukrainian local elections, he was elected as a deputy of the Dnipropetrovsk City Council for Front of Change. He also unsuccessfully ran for mayor. He headed the Dnipropetrovsk branch of Front of Change from 2009 to 2012.

Pavelko was number 29 on the electoral list of Batkivshchyna during the 2012 Ukrainian parliamentary election.

In October 2013, Pavelko was expelled from the Batkivshchyna parliamentary faction for "not sharing the position of the faction on key issues." In late 2013 he became the leader of the All-Ukrainian Union "Democrats".

In the 2014 Ukrainian parliamentary election, Pavelko was re-elected to parliament after being number 33 on the electoral list of Petro Poroshenko Bloc. In February 2019, his vote was registered in parliament while he was in Italy attending UEFA's 43rd congress.

Pavelko did not take part in the 2019 Ukrainian parliamentary election.

== Scandals ==
in June 2018, the NABU opened proceedings suspecting Pavelko of abuse in the construction of artificial football mini-fields. Future LLC was the applicant in the proceedings. In January 2022, the Specialized Anti-Corruption Prosecutor's Office stated that no evidence of Pavelko's guilt had been established. The case was transferred to the National Police of Ukraine.

In 2020, the Verkhovna Rada formed a temporary investigative commission to investigate the construction of artificial football mini-fields; after the commission began its work, seven criminal proceedings were opened in Ukraine, and other cases were opened in Germany, Switzerland, and Cyprus. In 2020, representatives of the National Anti-Corruption Bureau of Ukraine, the Prosecutor General of Ukraine, and the National Police announced that there were no criminal proceedings against Pavelko.

In November 2020, members of parliament refused to vote for the extension of the Provisional Investigation Commission's work. The commission's interim findings indicated a lack of evidence against the UAF leadership.

On 29 November 2022, the Pechersk Court ordered the arrest of Pavelko and UAF Secretary General Yuriy Zapisotskyi for two months with bail of UAH 9.88 million, but Pavelko was released shortly after posting bail.

In February 2023, the Pechersk District Court of Kyiv suspended Pavelko as president of the Ukrainian Football Association until 17 March in connection with corruption and embezzlement charges.

On 16 June 2023, the Shevchenkivsky District Court of Lviv arrested Pavelko on charges of fraud and embezzlement of UAH 26.5 million, and sent him to a pre-trial detention center for 60 days.

In July 2023, the Court of Appeal did not grant Pavelko's request to change the preventive measure.

== Achievements ==
In 2019, under his leadership of the UAF, the Ukraine national football team won in ten matches, including eight matches of the UEFA Euro 2020 qualifying. They also reached the UEFA Euro 2020. In addition, the Ukraine national under-20 football team, led by Oleksandr Petrakov, won the FIFA U-20 World Cup.

== Anti-corruption law ==
While serving as People's Deputy of Ukraine, Pavelko initiated law No.743-VIII "On the prevention of corruption offences influence on the results of sporting competitions". The parliament passed the law in November 2015.

Preceded by Anatoliy Konkov	President of the FFU; 2015–2019	Succeeded by Himself (as President of the UAF)
Preceded by Himself (as President of the FFU)	President of the UAF; 2019–present	Succeeded by incumbent
