= 1965–66 Soviet Cup =

1965–66 Cup of USSR in Football
Кубок СССР

Tournament details
- Country: Soviet Union
- Dates: April 2, 1965 – November 8, 1966
- Teams: 79 (final stage)

Final positions
- Champions: Dinamo Kiev
- Runners-up: Torpedo Moscow

The 1965–66 Soviet Cup was an association football cup competition of the Soviet Union. The organization of the competition was confusing and some teams that were eliminated in qualification rounds still proceeded to the Final round which was taking place in 1966.

The winner of the competition, Dinamo Kiev qualified for the continental tournament.

== Participating teams ==
Enter in Final round		Enter in Qualification round		
Class A		Class B		
Group 1 19/19 teams ✓ Dinamo Kiev; ✓ SKA Rostov-na-Donu; ✓ Neftianik Baku; ✓ Spartak Moscow; ✓ CSKA Moscow; ✓ Torpedo Moscow; ✓ Dinamo Tbilisi; ✓ Dinamo Moscow; ✓ Pakhtakor Tashkent; ✓ Shakhter Donetsk; ✓ Dinamo Minsk; ✓ Kairat Alma-Ata; ✓ Ararat Yerevan; ✓ Chernomorets Odessa; ✓ Torpedo Kutaisi; ✓ Zenit Leningrad; ✓ Lokomotiv Moscow; ✓ Krylya Sovetov Kuibyshev; ✓ SKA Odessa	Group 2 51/53 teams ✓ Zhalgiris Vilnius; ✓ Tekstilschik Ivanovo; ✓ Kuban Krasnodar; ✓ Dinamo Kirovabad; ✓ Rubin Kazan; ✓ Daugava Riga; ✓ Lokomotiv Tbilisi; ✓ Terek Grozny; ✓ Dinamo Batumi; ✓ Spartak Nalchik; ✓ Rostselmash Rostov-na-Donu; ✓ Traktor Volgograd; ✓ Dinamo Stavropol; ✓ Baltika Kaliningrad; ✓ Spartak Gomel; ✓ Shirak Leninakan; ✓ Dinamo Tallinn ✓ Zaria Lugansk; ✓ SKA Kiev; ✓ SKA Lvov; ✓ Lokomotiv Vinnitsa; ✓ Dinamo Leningrad; ✓ Trud Voronezh; ✓ Metallurg Zaporozhye; ✓ Dnepr Dnepropetrovsk; ✓ Sokol Saratov; ✓ Avangard Kharkov; ✓ Volga Kalinin; ✓ Tavriya Simferopol; ✓ Avyntul Kishinev; ✓ Karpaty Lvov; ✓ Sudostoitel Nikolayev; ✓ Shinnik Yaroslavl; ✓ Volga Gorkiy; ✓ Zvezda Kirovograd ✓ Politodel Tashkent Oblast; ✓ Shakhter Karaganda; ✓ Stroitel Ufa; ✓ Alga Frunze; ✗ Luch Vladivostok; ✓ Uralmash Sverdlovsk; ✓ Lokomotiv Chelyabinsk; ✓ Stroitel Ashkhabad; ✓ Energetik Dushanbe; ✓ Temp Barnaul; ✓ Kuzbass Kemerovo; ✗ SKA Khabarovsk; ✓ SKA Novosibirsk; ✓ Torpedo Tomsk; ✓ Irtysh Omsk; ✓ Zvezda Perm; ✓ Vostok Ust-Kamenogorsk; ✓ Neftianik Fergana	RSFSR I (1965 – 17/18) ✓ Avtomobilist Leningrad; ✓ Baltika Kaliningrad; ✓ Lokomotiv Kaluga; ✓ Granitas Klapeida; ✓ Zvezda Serpukhov; ✓ Dinamo Briansk; ✓ Saturn Rybinsk; ✓ Khimik Novomoskovsk; ✓ Metallurg Tula; ✗ Onezhets Petrozavodsk; ✓ Avangard Kolomna; ✓ Metallurg Cherepovets; ✓ Sever Murmansk; ✓ Tekmash Kostroma; ✓ Serp i Molot Moscow; ✓ Zveiniyeks Liyepaya; ✓ Iskra Smolensk; ✓ Khimik Klin	RSFSR II (1965 – 17/19) ✓ Spartak Ryazan; ✓ Rubin Kazan; ✓ Khimik Dzerzhinsk; ✓ Spartak Yoshkar-Ola; ✓ Zenit Izhevsk; ✓ Znamia Noginsk; ✓ Uralets Nizhniy Tagil; ✓ Zvezda Perm; ✗ Neftianik Bugulma; ✓ Dinamo Kirov; ✓ Znamia Truda Orekhovo-Zuyevo; ✓ Torpedo Pavlovo; ✓ Traktor Vladimir; ✓ Khimik Berezniki; ✓ Salyut Kamensk-Uralskiy; ✓ Progress Zelenodolsk; ✓ Neftianik Tyumen; ✓ Kovrovets Kovrov; ✗ Energiya Cheboksary	RSFSR III (1965 – 18/19) ✗ Sokol Saratov; ✓ Torpedo Armavir; ✓ Volgar Astrakhan; ✓ Torpedo Lipetsk; ✓ Trudovye Rezervy Kursk; ✓ Volga Ulyanovsk; ✓ Spartak Belgorod; ✓ Spartak Oryol; ✓ Torpedo Taganrog; ✓ Metallurg Kuibyshev; ✓ Energiya Volzhskiy; ✓ Spartak Tambov; ✓ Neftianik Syzran; ✓ Progress Kamensk-Shakhtinskiy; ✓ Spartak Saransk; ✓ Trud Toliatti; ✓ Shakhter Shakhty; ✓ Energiya Novocherkassk; ✓ Trud Penza
Group 1 19/19 teams ✓ Dinamo Kiev; ✓ SKA Rostov-na-Donu; ✓ Neftianik Baku; ✓ Spartak Moscow; ✓ CSKA Moscow; ✓ Torpedo Moscow; ✓ Dinamo Tbilisi; ✓ Dinamo Moscow; ✓ Pakhtakor Tashkent; ✓ Shakhter Donetsk; ✓ Dinamo Minsk; ✓ Kairat Alma-Ata; ✓ Ararat Yerevan; ✓ Chernomorets Odessa; ✓ Torpedo Kutaisi; ✓ Zenit Leningrad; ✓ Lokomotiv Moscow; ✓ Krylya Sovetov Kuibyshev; ✓ SKA Odessa		RSFSR IV (1965 – 20/21) ✓ Spartak Nalchik; ✓ Dinamo Baku; ✓ Dinamo Kirovabad; ✓ Tsement Novorossiysk; ✓ Dinamo Sukhumi; ✓ Shirak Leninakan; ✓ Urozhai Maikop; ✓ Kolkhida Poti; ✓ Spartak Ordzhonikidze; ✓ Dinamo Batumi; ✓ Meshakhte Tkibuli; ✓ Lori Kirovakan; ✓ Inguri Zugdidi; ✓ Dinamo Makhachkala; ✓ Alazani Gurdzhaani; ✗ Lernagorts Kafan; ✓ Dinamo Stavropol; ✓ Trudovye Rezervy Kislovodsk; ✓ Metallurg Rustavi; ✓ Polad Sumgait; ✓ Sevan Oktemberyan	RSFSR V (1965 – 20/20) ✓ Irtysh Omsk; ✓ Neftianik Fergana; ✓ Stroitel Ufa; ✓ Metallurg Magnitogorsk; ✓ Pamir Leninabad; ✓ Metallist Dzhambul; ✓ Khimik Chirchik; ✓ Dinamo Tselinograd; ✓ Lokomotiv Orenburg; ✓ Zarafshan Navoi; ✓ Metallurg Chimkent; ✓ Khimik Salavat; ✓ Trud Kurgan; ✓ Spartak Andizhan; ✓ Spartak Samarkand; ✓ Sverdlovets Tashkent Oblast; ✓ Shakhter Osh; ✓ Torpedo Miass; ✓ Zakhmed Chardzhou; ✓ Metallurg Zlatoust	RSFSR VI (1965 – 19/19) ✓ Luch Vladivostok; ✓ Torpedo Tomsk; ✓ Temp Barnaul; ✓ SKA Khabarovsk; ✓ Vostok Ust-Kamenogorsk; ✓ Armeyets Ulan-Ude; ✓ Avangard Komsomolsk-na-Amure; ✓ Zabaikalets Chita; ✓ Start Angarsk; ✓ Angara Irkutsk; ✓ Khimik Kemerovo; ✓ Irtysh Pavlodar; ✓ Amur Blagoveschensk; ✓ Sibselmash Novosibirsk; ✓ Shakhter Prokopyevsk; ✓ Lokomotiv Krasnoyarsk; ✓ Torpedo Rubtsovsk; ✓ Metallurg Novokuznetsk; ✓ Tsementnik Semipalatinsk
Group 1 19/19 teams ✓ Dinamo Kiev; ✓ SKA Rostov-na-Donu; ✓ Neftianik Baku; ✓ Spartak Moscow; ✓ CSKA Moscow; ✓ Torpedo Moscow; ✓ Dinamo Tbilisi; ✓ Dinamo Moscow; ✓ Pakhtakor Tashkent; ✓ Shakhter Donetsk; ✓ Dinamo Minsk; ✓ Kairat Alma-Ata; ✓ Ararat Yerevan; ✓ Chernomorets Odessa; ✓ Torpedo Kutaisi; ✓ Zenit Leningrad; ✓ Lokomotiv Moscow; ✓ Krylya Sovetov Kuibyshev; ✓ SKA Odessa		Ukraine (1965 – 3) ✓ Avangard Ternopol; ✓ Desna Chernigov; ✓ Lokomotiv Kherson	Central Asia and Kazakhstan (19/19) ✓ Pamir Leninabad; ✓ Metallurg Chimkent; ✓ Dinamo Tselinograd; ✓ Zarafshan Navoi; ✓ Metallurg Temirtau; ✓ Khimik Chirchik; ✓ Sverdlovets Tashkent Oblast; ✓ ADK Alma-Ata; ✓ Spartak Andizhan; ✓ Metallist Dzhambul; ✓ Shakhter Osh; ✓ Pakhtaaral Syrdarya Oblast; ✓ Dimitrovets Tashkent Oblast; ✓ Spartak Samarkand; ✓ Zakhmed Chardzhou; ✓ Pakhtakor Kurgan-Tyube; ✓ Metallurg Almalyk; ✓ Vakhsh Nurek; ✓ Bukhoro Bukhara	

Source: []

Notes

- The underlined are marked teams that entered the competition in 1966 for the second time, but initially in 1965 they competed as part of the 1965 Soviet Class B qualification (preliminary) stage within the RSFSR zones.

== Competition schedule ==
=== Preliminary stage ===
==== Group 1 (Russian Federation) ====
===== Preliminary round =====
Avangard Kolomna              2-3  SERP I MOLOT Moskva

===== First round =====
[Apr 25, 1965] 
Baltika Kaliningrad           0-1  SATURN Rybinsk 
DINAMO Bryansk                1-0  TekMash Kostroma 
Granitas Klaipeda             0-0  Avtomobilist Leningrad 
KHIMIK Novomoskovsk           2-0  Khimik Klin 
Lokomotiv Kaluga              2-3  METALLURG Tula 
METALLURG Cherepovets         2-0  Iskra Smolensk 
ZVEJNIEKS Liepaja             1-0  Sever Murmansk 
ZVEZDA Serpukhov              1-0  Serp i Molot Moskva

====== First round replays ======
[Apr 26] 
GRANITAS Klaipeda             3-0  Avtomobilist Leningrad

===== Quarterfinals =====
[May 6, 1965] 
KHIMIK Novomoskovsk           1-0  Metallurg Tula 
METALLURG Cherepovets         1-0  Saturn Rybinsk 
Zvejnieks Liepaja             1-2  GRANITAS Klaipeda 
ZVEZDA Serpukhov              3-2  Dinamo Bryansk               [aet]

===== Semifinals =====
[Jul 24, 1965] 
GRANITAS Klaipeda             2-0  Metallurg Cherepovets 
Khimik Novomoskovsk           0-4  ZVEZDA Serpukhov

===== Final =====
[Aug 1, 1965] 
GRANITAS Klaipeda             1-0  Zvezda Serpukhov

==== Group 2 (Russian Federation) ====
===== Preliminary round =====
Progress Zelyonodolsk         1-1  Dinamo Kirov

====== Preliminary round replays ======
PROGRESS Zelyonodolsk         1-0  Dinamo Kirov

===== First round =====
[Apr 25, 1965] 
KHIMIK Dzerzhinsk             2-0  Salyut Kamensk-Uralskiy 
KOVROVETS Kovrov              1-0  Neftyanik Tyumen 
PROGRESS Zelyonodolsk         2-0  Spartak Yoshkar-Ola 
SPARTAK Ryazan                2-0  Zenit Izhevsk 
TORPEDO Pavlovo               2-1  Uralets Nizhniy Tagil 
Traktor Vladimir              0-2  RUBIN Kazan 
Znamya Noginsk                1-2  ZVEZDA Perm 
ZNAMYA TRUDA Orekhovo-Zuyevo  3-0  Khimik Berezniki

===== Quarterfinals =====
[Jul 20, 1965] 
PROGRESS Zelyonodolsk         1-0  Khimik Dzerzhinsk 
RUBIN Kazan                   2-0  Znamya Truda Orekhovo-Zuyevo 
TORPEDO Pavlovo               1-0  Kovrovets Kovrov 
Zvezda Perm                   1-2  Spartak Ryazan

===== Semifinals =====
[Sep 21, 1965] 
Progress Zelyonodolsk         1-2  TORPEDO Pavlovo 
RUBIN Kazan                   3-2  Spartak Ryazan

===== Final =====
TORPEDO Pavlovo               w/o  Rubin Kazan

==== Group 3 (Russian Federation) ====
===== Preliminary round =====
ENERGIYA Volzhskiy            1-0  Spartak Oryol 
Volgar Astrakhan              0-0  Energiya Novocherkassk

====== Preliminary round replays ======
Volgar Astrakhan              0-1  ENERGIYA Novocherkassk

===== First round =====
[Apr 25, 1965] 
PROGRESS Kamensk              2-0  Energiya Novocherkassk 
SHAKHTYOR Shakhty             2-1  Trud Togliatti 
Torpedo Armavir               1-2  SPARTAK Saransk 
Torpedo Lipetsk               1-1  Spartak Belgorod 
TORPEDO Taganrog              2-1  Spartak Tambov 
Trud Penza                    0-2  METALLURG Kuibyshev 
Trudoviye Rezervy Kursk       0-3  ENERGIYA Volzhskiy 
Volga Ulyanovsk               1-2  NEFTYANIK Syzran

====== First round replays ======
[Apr 26] 
Torpedo Lipetsk               1-2  SPARTAK Belgorod

===== Quarterfinals =====
METALLURG Kuibyshev           1-0  Neftyanik Syzran 
Progress Kamensk              1-2  SHAKHTYOR Shakhty 
SPARTAK Belgorod              1-0  Energiya Volzhskiy 
Spartak Saransk               1-2  TORPEDO Taganrog

===== Semifinals =====
[Sep 2, 1965] 
METALLURG Kuibyshev           3-1  Spartak Belgorod 
Shakhtyor Shakhty             1-2  TORPEDO Taganrog             [aet]

===== Final =====
[Oct 27, 1965] 
TORPEDO Taganrog              2-1  Metallurg Kuibyshev

==== Group 4 (Russian Federation) ====
===== Preliminary round =====
DINAMO Kirovabad              3-1  Dinamo Baku 
LORI Kirovakan                w/o  Sevan Oktemberyan 
Metallurg Rustavi             0-2  MESHAKHTE Tkibuli 
SHIRAK Leninakan              1-0  Alazani Gurjaani

===== First round =====
[Apr 24, 1965] 
DINAMO Batumi                 1-0  Dinamo Stavropol             [aet] 
Dinamo Kirovabad              w/o  LORI Kirovakan 
Dinamo Makhachkala            0-0  Polad Sumgait 
Dinamo Sukhumi                1-1  Cement Novorossiysk 
KOLKHIDA Poti                 2-1  Inguri Zugdidi 
Shirak Leninakan              1-3  MESHAKHTE Tkibuli 
SPARTAK Nalchik               1-0  Urozhai Maykop 
SPARTAK Orjonikidze           3-2  Trudoviye Rezervy Kislovodsk [aet]

====== First round replays ======
[Apr 25] 
DINAMO Makhachkala            w/o  Polad Sumgait 
DINAMO Sukhumi                4-2  Cement Novorossiysk

===== Quarterfinals =====
[May 6, 1965] 
KOLKHIDA Poti                 2-0  Dinamo Batumi 
LORI Kirovakan                2-1  Spartak Nalchik 
MESHAKHTE Tkibuli             3-1  Dinamo Sukhumi 
SPARTAK Orjonikidze           4-0  Dinamo Makhachkala

===== Semifinals =====
[Oct 30, 1965] 
Lori Kirovakan                0-3  SPARTAK Orjonikidze 
Meshakhte Tkibuli             1-1  Kolkhida Poti

====== Semifinals replays ======
[Oct 31]
MESHAKHTE Tkibuli             w/o  Kolkhida Poti

===== Final =====
[Nov 14, 1965]
Spartak Orjonikidze           1-1  Meshakhte Tkibuli

====== Final replays ======
[Nov 15] 
Spartak Orjonikidze           1-1  Meshakhte Tkibuli 
[Nov 17] 
SPARTAK Orjonikidze           2-1  Meshakhte Tkibuli

==== Group 5 (Russian Federation) ====
===== Preliminary round =====
[Apr 18, 1965] 
KHIMIK Chirchik               1-0  Spartak Andizhan 
METALLIST Jambul              2-0  Khimik Salavat 
METALLURG Chimkent            2-1  Dinamo Tselinograd 
Sverdlovets Tashkent Region   0-6  IRTYSH Omsk

===== First round =====
KHIMIK Chirchik               2-0  Metallist Jambul 
METALLURG Chimkent            3-2  Irtysh Omsk 
METALLURG Magnitogorsk        2-1  Zahmet Charjou 
NEFTYANIK Fergana             2-0  Torpedo Miass 
PAMIR Leninabad               3-0  Metallurg Zlatoust 
Shakhtyor Osh                 1-1  Trud Kurgan 
SPARTAK Samarkand             2-0  Lokomotiv Orenburg 
STROITEL Ufa                  1-0  Zarafshan Navoi

====== First round replays ======
Shakhtyor Osh                 1-5  TRUD Kurgan

===== Quarterfinals =====
METALLURG Magnitogorsk        1-0  Spartak Samarkand            [aet] 
PAMIR Leninabad               w/o  Metallurg Chimkent 
STROITEL Ufa                  2-1  Khimik Chirchik 
TRUD Kurgan                   2-1  Neftyanik Fergana            [aet]

===== Semifinals =====
STROITEL Ufa                  5-2  Metallurg Magnitogorsk 
TRUD Kurgan                   1-0  Pamir Leninabad

===== Final =====
[Oct 9, 1965] 
TRUD Kurgan                   2-1  Stroitel Ufa

==== Group 6 (Russian Federation) ====
===== Preliminary round =====
ARMEYETS Ulan-Ude             2-1  Torpedo Tomsk 
SIBSELMASH Novosibirsk        w/o  Metallurg Novokuznetsk 
ZABAIKALETS Chita             w/o  Shakhtyor Prokopyevsk

===== First round =====
[Apr 28, 1965] 
AMUR Blagoveshchensk          1-0  SKA Khabarovsk 
Armeyets Ulan-Ude             1-1  Zabaikalets Chita 
CEMENTNIK Semipalatinsk       1-0  Irtysh Pavlodar              [aet] 
LOKOMOTIV Krasnoyarsk         2-0  Khimik Kemerovo 
Luch Vladivostok              0-0  Avangard Komsomolsk-na-Amure 
Temp Barnaul                  0-0  Angara Irkutsk 
TORPEDO Rubtsovsk             4-1  SibSelMash Novosibirsk       [aet] 
VOSTOK Ust-Kamenogorsk        2-0  Start Angarsk

====== First round replays ======
[Apr 29] 
ARMEYETS Ulan-Ude             2-0  Zabaikalets Chita 
Luch Vladivostok              0-1  AVANGARD Komsomolsk-na-Amure 
TEMP Barnaul                  2-1  Angara Irkutsk

===== Quarterfinals =====
[May 22, 1965] 
Avangard Komsomolsk-na-Amure  0-0  Amur Blagoveshchensk 
TEMP Barnaul                  2-1  Armeyets Ulan-Ude 
TORPEDO Rubtsovsk             3-1  Lokomotiv Krasnoyarsk        [aet] 
VOSTOK Ust-Kamenogorsk        2-0  Cementnik Semipalatinsk

====== Quarterfinals replays ======
[May 23] 
Avangard Komsomolsk-na-Amure  0-0  Amur Blagoveshchensk 
[May 25] 
AVANGARD Komsomolsk-na-Amure  2-1  Amur Blagoveshchensk

===== Semifinals =====
[Aug 3, 1965] 
AVANGARD Komsomolsk-na-Amure  2-1  Temp Barnaul 
VOSTOK Ust-Kamenogorsk        4-1  Torpedo Rubtsovsk

===== Final =====
AVANGARD Komsomolsk-na-Amure  2-0  Vostok Ust-Kamenogorsk

==== Group Central Asia and Kazakhstan ====
===== Preliminary round =====
SHAKHTYOR Osh                 6-0  Pahtakor Kurgan-Tyube 
SPARTAK Andizhan              3-1  Zahmet Charjou 
SPARTAK Samarkand             2-0  Metallurg Chimkent

===== First round =====
KHIMIK Chirchik               3-1  Pamir Leninabad 
METALLIST Jambul              1-0  Zarafshan Navoi 
METALLURG Almalyk             1-0  ADK Alma-Ata 
METALLURG Temirtau            1-0  Dinamo Tselinograd 
Spartak Andizhan              0-0  Shakhtyor Osh 
SPARTAK Samarkand             1-0  Buhoro Buhara 
SVERDLOVETS Tashkent Region   2-0  Dimitrovets Tashkent Region 
VAKHSH Nurek                  3-2  Pahtaaral Gulistan

====== First round replays ======
Spartak Andizhan              1-2  SHAKHTYOR Osh

===== Quarterfinals =====
KHIMIK Chirchik               2-0  Spartak Samarkand 
METALLURG Almalyk             2-0  Metallurg Temirtau 
SHAKHTYOR Osh                 3-1  Metallist Jambul 
VAKHSH Nurek                  3-2  Sverdlovets Tashkent Region

===== Semifinals =====
KHIMIK Chirchik               4-1  Vakhsh Nurek 
SHAKHTYOR Osh                 3-0  Metallurg Almalyk

===== Final =====
KHIMIK Chirchik               1-0  Shakhtyor Osh

=== Final stage ===
==== Preliminary round ====
[Jun 19] 
ALGA Frunze                   3-0  Stroitel Ashkhabad 
Desna Chernigov               0-1  AVYNTUL Kishinev 
DNEPR Dnepropetrovsk          3-0  Baltika Kaliningrad 
GRANITAS Klaipeda             2-1  Zvezda Kirovograd            [aet] 
KHIMIK Chirchik               2-0  Avangard Kharkov 
LOKOMOTIV Vinnitsa            3-2  Tavria Simferopol            [aet] 
TEREK Grozny                  1-0  Dinamo Batumi 
Trud Voronezh                 0-1  LOKOMOTIV Tbilisi

==== First round ====
[Jun 18] 
Dinamo Stavropol              1-1  RostSelMash Rostov-na-Donu  
  [? – Alexei Levchenko] 
[Jun 19] 
AVANGARD Komsomolsk-na-Amure  w/o  Kuban Krasnodar 
Avangard Ternopol             0-2  URALMASH Sverdlovsk 
  [Vladimir Yerokhin, Anatoliy Zhos] 
DINAMO Kirovabad              2-1  Sudostroitel Nikolayev 
  [? – Boris Baluyev] 
DINAMO Leningrad              1-0  SKA Novosibirsk 
ENERGETIK Dushanbe            4-0  SKA Kiev 
  [Vladimir Makarov, Gennadiy Shepilov, Yuriy Pekshev, Georgiy Gventsadze] 
IRTYSH Omsk                   2-0  Neftyanik Fergana 
  [Anatoliy Grinko, Viktor Maksimenko] 
KARPATY Lvov                  3-2  SKA Lvov 
KUZBASS Kemerovo              w/o  Daugava Riga 
LOKOMOTIV Chelyabinsk         7-1  Spartak Nalchik 
  [Gennadiy Yepishin-2, Anatoliy Tikhonov-2, Valeriy Bryabrin, Vladimir Mozzhukhin, Vladimir Korotayev - ?] 
RUBIN Kazan                   5-1  Shirak Leninakan 
SHINNIK Yaroslavl             1-0  Vostok Ust-Kamenogorsk 
  [Vladimir Bystrov] 
SPARTAK Orjonikidze           2-1  Volga Gorkiy 
  [Mikhail Miroshnikov, Valeriy Babanov - ?] 
Stroitel Ufa                  2-3  METALLURG Zaporozhye         [aet] 
  [Valentin Aksyonov, Leonid Permyakov - ?] 
TEMP Barnaul                  2-0  Sokol Saratov 
  [Vladimir Akuzin, Vladimir Skorichenko] 
TEXTILSHCHIK Ivanovo          3-0  Zarya Lugansk 
  [Vladimir Neboronov 15, Vladimir Belkov 40, 68] 
Torpedo Pavlovo               0-0  Zvezda Perm 
Torpedo Taganrog              1-3  SHAKHTYOR Karaganda          [aet] 
TRAKTOR Volgograd             4-0  Politotdel Tashkent Region 
  [Viktor Orlov-3, Valeriy Pogorelov] 
TRUD Kurgan                   2-0  Torpedo Tomsk 
ŽALGIRIS Vilnius              4-0  Dinamo Tallinn 
[Jun 20] 
Spartak Gomel                 0-4  VOLGA Kalinin 
  [Yuriy Savchenko, Yevgeniy Zhuravlyov, Alexandr Stenishchev, Nikolai Timokhin] 
[Jul 12] 
ALGA Frunze                   w/o  Granitas Klaipeda 
AVYNTUL Kishinev              6-0  Lokomotiv Vinnitsa 
LOKOMOTIV Tbilisi             7-0  Khimik Chirchik 
[Jul 14] 
TEREK Grozny                  1-0  Dnepr Dnepropetrovsk         [aet]

===== First round replays =====
[Jun 19] 
DINAMO Stavropol              3-0  RostSelMash Rostov-na-Donu 
[Jun 20] 
TORPEDO Pavlovo               2-0  Zvezda Perm

==== Second round ====
[Jul 11] 
TRAKTOR Volgograd             4-1  Textilshchik Ivanovo         [aet] 
  [Valeriy Pogorelov-2, Alexandr Apshev, Viktor Zolenko – Gennadiy Shadrunov] 
[Jul 18] 
Spartak Orjonikidze           1-2  DINAMO Kirovabad 
  [Yuriy Savvidi - ?] 
[Jul 19] 
Avangard Komsomolsk-na-Amure  0-3  SHINNIK Yaroslavl 
  [Gennadiy Shilin-2, Vladimir Bystrov] 
AVYNTUL Kishinev              2-0  Terek Grozny 
DINAMO Leningrad              2-0  Žalgiris Vilnius 
DINAMO Stavropol              2-0  Torpedo Pavlovo 
KUZBASS Kemerovo              2-1  Trud Kurgan 
  [Gennadiy Trifonov, Vladimir Musokhranov - ?] 
LOKOMOTIV Chelyabinsk         6-1  Irtysh Omsk 
  [Vladimir Mozzhukhin-2, Gennadiy Yepishin-2, Vladimir Korotayev, Alexandr Solovei – Zinoviy Bilen] 
LOKOMOTIV Tbilisi             w/o  Alga Frunze 
Metallurg Zaporozhye          0-2  RUBIN Kazan 
SHAKHTYOR Karaganda           2-0  Energetik Dushanbe 
Temp Barnaul                  1-3  KARPATY Lvov                 [aet] 
Volga Kalinin                 1-1  UralMash Sverdlovsk

===== Second round replays =====
[Jul 20] 
Volga Kalinin                 0-2  URALMASH Sverdlovsk 
  [Anatoliy Artyukh, Sergei Okhremchuk]

==== Third round ====
[Jul 23] 
DINAMO Kirovabad              4-1  SKA Rostov-na-Donu           [aet] 
  [? – Yuriy Kolinko] 
[Aug 6] 
DINAMO Leningrad              1-0  Torpedo Kutaisi 
  [Vladimir Petrov 50] 
Karpaty Lvov                  1-1  Zenit Leningrad 
  [Viktor Yevlentyev 15 – Evald Alam 60] 
Kuzbass Kemerovo              1-2  CHERNOMORETS Odessa          [aet] 
  [Vladimir Razdayev 85 – Valeriy Lobanovskiy ?, 120] 
LOKOMOTIV Chelyabinsk         2-1  Krylya Sovetov Kuibyshev 
  [Valeriy Ivanov 44, Anatoliy Tikhonov 75 – Yuriy Kapsin 89] 
Lokomotiv Tbilisi             0-1  TORPEDO Moskva 
  [Vladimir Shcherbakov 46] 
Rubin Kazan                   0-1  DINAMO Minsk 
  [Valentin Koltunov 71] 
Shakhtyor Karaganda           1-2  DINAMO Moskva                [aet] 
  [Oleg Maltsev 62 – Boris Kokh 15, Viktor Anichkin 109] 
SHINNIK Yaroslavl             3-1  Ararat Yerevan 
  [Anatoliy Maltsev, Gennadiy Zabelin, Vladimir Bystrov - ?] 
TRAKTOR Volgograd             1-0  Neftyanik Baku               [aet] 
  [Valeriy Pogorelov 117] 
[Aug 7] 
Avyntul Kishinev              0-1  SPARTAK Moskva 
  [Vyacheslav Ambartsumyan 71] 
Dinamo Stavropol              0-1  DINAMO Kiev 
  [Valeriy Porkuyan 58] 
SHAKHTYOR Donetsk             3-1  Dinamo Tbilisi               [aet] 
  [Anatoliy Pilipchuk 34, 100 pen, Stanislav Yevseyenko 108 – Nomal Maisuradze 78] 
URALMASH Sverdlovsk           3-1  SKA Odessa 
  [Vladimir Kapustin 12, Yuriy Zubkov 47, Sergei Okhremchuk 52 – Viktor Kotychenko 1] 
[Aug 11] 
PAHTAKOR Tashkent             2-0  CSKA Moskva 
  [Bohadyr Ibragimov 52, Gennadiy Krasnitskiy 74] 
[Aug 13] 
KAYRAT Alma-Ata               2-1  Lokomotiv Moskva 
  [Vladislav Markin 22, Sergei Kvochkin 59 – Vladimir Kozlov 67]

===== Third round replays =====
[Aug 7] 
Karpaty Lvov                  1-2  ZENIT Leningrad 
  [Anatoliy Kroshchenko 82 – Valentin Gusev 83, Nikolai Ryazanov 85]

==== Fourth round ====
[Aug 13] 
URALMASH Sverdlovsk        2-0  Lokomotiv Chelyabinsk 
  [Yuriy Zubkov 50, Vladimir Kapustin 73] 
[Aug 23] 
SPARTAK Moskva             2-0  Shakhtyor Donetsk 
  [Galimzyan Husainov 56, Nikolai Osyanin 90] 
[Aug 25] 
CHERNOMORETS Odessa        2-0  Pahtakor Tashkent 
  [Valeriy Lobanovskiy 35, Anatoliy Korshunov 51] 
SHINNIK Yaroslavl          3-0  Dinamo Leningrad 
  [Vladimir Bystrov 19, 41, Anatoliy Maltsev 69] 
[Aug 26] 
DINAMO Kiev                3-0  Zenit Leningrad 
  [Ferents Medvid 36, 90, Andrei Biba 79] 
DINAMO Minsk               2-1  Dinamo Moskva                [aet] 
  [Mikhail Mustygin 42, Igor Ryomin 110 – Igor Chislenko 87] 
KAYRAT Alma-Ata            2-1  Dinamo Kirovabad 
  [Oleg Volokh 8, Vladislav Markin 10 – Muzafar Kasumov 85 pen] 
TORPEDO Moskva             3-1  Traktor Volgograd 
  [Eduard Streltsov 9, ?, Valentin Denisov ? – Anatoliy Rebrov 57]

==== Quarterfinals ====
[Sep 3] 
CHERNOMORETS Odessa     3-1  UralMash Sverdlovsk 
  [Valeriy Lobanovskiy 22, 60, Oleg Bazilevich 68 – Sergei Okhremchuk 71] 
[Sep 4] 
TORPEDO Moskva          2-1  Kayrat Alma-Ata 
  [Eduard Streltsov 48, Vyacheslav Andreyuk 89 – Sergei Kvochkin 68] 
[Sep 5] 
DINAMO Minsk            1-0  Shinnik Yaroslavl              [aet] 
  [Mikhail Mustygin 109 pen] 
[Sep 16] 
DINAMO Kiev             4-1  Spartak Moskva 
  [Yozhef Sabo 32 pen, 81, Anatoliy Byshovets 49, 57 – Galimzyan Husainov 82]

==== Semifinals ====
[Oct 7, Leningrad] 
TORPEDO Moskva          3-0  Chernomorets Odessa 
  [Vladimir Brednev 22, Eduard Streltsov 88, 89] 
[Oct 9, Tbilisi] 
DINAMO Kiev             1-0  Dinamo Minsk                   [aet] 
  [Vasiliy Turyanchik 115]

==== Final ====
8 November 1966

Torpedo Moscow	0 – 2	Dinamo Kiev
	[ Report]	Byshovets 1'; Biba 73'

Moscow
