= 1965 Soviet Class B =

Second League
- Season: 1965

1965 Soviet Class B was a Soviet football competition at the Soviet third tier.

== Russian Federation ==
=== Semifinal Group 1 ===
[Kaliningrad]

Pos	Team	Pld	W	D	L	GF	GA	GD	Pts
1	Rubin Kazan	4	4	0	0	9	4	+5	8
2	Baltika Kaliningrad	4	1	1	2	6	7	−1	3
3	Luch Vladivostok	4	0	1	3	4	8	−4	1

=== Semifinal Group 2 ===
[Saratov]

Pos	Team	Pld	W	D	L	GF	GA	GD	Pts
1	Sokol Saratov	4	2	2	0	4	1	+3	6
2	Spartak Ryazan	4	1	2	1	4	4	0	4
3	Cement Novorossiysk	4	0	2	2	2	5	−3	2

=== Semifinal Group 3 ===
[Armavir]

Pos	Team	Pld	W	D	L	GF	GA	GD	Pts
1	Stroitel Ufa	4	2	1	1	9	5	+4	5
2	Torpedo Armavir	4	2	0	2	6	7	−1	4
3	Avtomobilist Leningrad	4	1	1	2	7	10	−3	3

=== Semifinal Group 4 ===
[Nalchik]

Pos	Team	Pld	W	D	L	GF	GA	GD	Pts
1	Spartak Nalchik	4	4	0	0	12	0	+12	8
2	Irtysh Omsk	4	1	1	2	2	4	−2	3
3	Torpedo Tomsk	4	0	1	3	0	10	−10	1

=== Final group ===
[Nov 13-20, Nalchik]

Pos	Team	Pld	W	D	L	GF	GA	GD	Pts
1	Spartak Nalchik	3	3	0	0	9	1	+8	6
2	Rubin Kazan	3	2	0	1	4	4	0	4
3	Sokol Saratov	3	1	0	2	5	6	−1	2
4	Stroitel Ufa	3	0	0	3	1	8	−7	0

== Ukraine ==
=== Second stage for places 1-6 ===
Pos	Team	Pld	W	D	L	GF	GA	GD	Pts
1	SKA Lvov	10	7	2	1	24	9	+15	16
2	SKA Kiev	10	7	1	2	23	16	+7	15
3	Avangard Zholtyye Vody	10	4	3	3	14	9	+5	11
4	Tavria Simferopol	10	3	4	3	10	11	−1	10
5	Avangard Ternopol	10	1	4	5	6	14	−8	6
6	Shakhtyor Kadiyevka	10	0	2	8	4	22	−18	2

=== Second stage for places 7-12 ===
Pos	Team	Pld	W	D	L	GF	GA	GD	Pts
7	Zvezda Kirovograd	10	6	3	1	14	9	+5	15
8	Kommunarets Kommunarsk	10	6	1	3	12	10	+2	13
9	Shakhtyor Alexandria	10	4	2	4	12	9	+3	10
10	Dinamo Khmelnitskiy	10	3	2	5	13	15	−2	8
11	SKF Sevastopol	10	2	4	4	8	10	−2	8
12	Kolos Poltava	10	2	2	6	7	13	−6	6

Source: rsssf.com

== Union republics ==
[Nov 19-24, Baku]

Pos	Rep	Team	Pld	W	D	L	GF	GA	GD	Pts
1	AZE	Dinamo Kirovabad	3	2	1	0	5	1	+4	5
1	AZE	Dinamo Baku	3	2	1	0	6	1	+5	5
3	TJK	Pamir Leninabad	3	1	0	2	4	8	−4	2
4	UZB	Neftyanik Fergana	3	0	0	3	1	6	−5	0

Source: rsssf.com

=== Additional final ===
Dinamo Kirovabad  0-0 Dinamo Baku  
[Dinamo Kirovabad won by draw]
