= Oleg Oshenkov =

Soviet footballer (1911–1976)

Personal information
- Full name: Oleg Aleksandrovich Oshenkov
- Date of birth: 27 May 1911
- Place of birth: Saint Petersburg, Russian Empire
- Date of death: 1 January 1976 (aged 64)
- Place of death: Kiev, Ukrainian SSR, Soviet Union

Senior career*
Years	Team	Apps	(Gls)
1931	Krasnyi Treugolnik		
1932–1934	Promkooperatsia		
1935	Spartak Leningrad		
1936–1940	Dynamo Leningrad		
1941	Zenit Leningrad		
1942–1947	Dynamo Leningrad		

Managerial career
- 1949–1950: Dynamo Leningrad
- 1951–1956: Dynamo Kyiv
- 1956: Ukraine
- 1957–1958: Trudovye Reservy
- 1959: Dynamo Kyiv
- 1960: Sudnobudivelnyk
- 1960–1969: Shakhtar Donetsk
- 1970: Sudnobudivelnyk
- 1972: USSR (assistant)
- 1975–1976: Metalist Kharkiv
- * Club domestic league appearances and goals

Oleg Aleksandrovich Oshenkov (Russian: Ошенков, Олег Александрович; 27 May 1911 – 1 January 1976) was a Soviet football player and coach. Merited Master of Sports of USSR (1953)

Born in the Russian capital, Saint Petersburg, Oshenkov spent all of his playing career in the city, while most of it playing for Dynamo Leningrad. As coach and manager, he worked with several clubs, including Dynamo Kyiv and Shakhtar Donetsk.

In 1956 along with Anton Idzkovsky, Oshenkov was a head coach of the Ukraine national team at the Summer Spartakiad of the Peoples of the USSR.

From 1971 through 1975 he chaired the Football Federation of Ukrainian SSR.

Preceded by Fedir Martynyuk	Presidents of FFU; 1971–1975	Succeeded by Mykola Fominykh
