= Ukrainian Association of Football =

Association football governing body of Ukraine

UEFA
- Short name: UAF
- Founded: 6 March 1991; 35 years ago
- Headquarters: Kyiv
- FIFA affiliation: 3 July 1992
- UEFA affiliation: 25 June 1992
- President: Andriy Shevchenko
- General Secretary: Ihor Hryshchenko
- Website: uaf.ua

The Ukrainian Association of Football (Ukrainian: Українська асоціація футболу, romanized: Ukrayins'ka Asotsiatsiya Futbolu, IPA: [ʊkrɐˈjinʲsʲkɐ ɐsots⁽ʲ⁾iˈɑts⁽ʲ⁾ijɐ fʊdˈbɔlʊ]; UAF) is the governing body of football in Ukraine. Before 2019, it was known as the Football Federation of Ukraine (FFU; Ukrainian: Федерація Футболу України, romanized: Federatsiya Futbolu Ukrayiny). (Note: Between 1992 and 2019, regional football organizations as well as the national Football Federation of Ukraine were called "federations". This naming followed the Soviet tradition. In 2019, the terminology was changed to align with the common European practice.) As a subject of the International Olympic Movement, UAF is a member of the National Olympic Committee of Ukraine. UAF is also member of international football organizations such as UEFA and FIFA.

The Ukrainian Football Association governs all sport events and organizations associated with the game of football including irregular competitions of beach football, mini-football, street football and others. Its main features include football competitions including the Ukrainian Professional League, the Ukrainian Cup, the Amatory, the competitions among the youth (under-18), and also the Ukraine national football team. It also sets the regulations to the Premier League and the Professional Football League.

It is headquartered in the national capital, Kyiv near the Olimpiyskiy National Sports Complex at the House of Football.

The organization was established in 1991 during the dissolution of the Soviet Union when Ukraine was still a union republic of the Soviet Union. The creation of the organization compared with similar organizations of other former union republics of the Soviet Union was among last. Previously between 1932 and 1991 with the Football Federation of the Soviet Union there existed its direct predecessor, Football Federation of Ukraine (Ukrainian SSR). The Soviet federation of Ukraine also conducted own championship, cup competitions, competitions among amateur teams (collectives of physical culture), as well as had own national team which participated exclusively in Soviet competitions such as the Spartakiad of Peoples of the USSR.

== History ==
=== Organizations' names ===
- All-Ukrainian Football Union (1918)
- Football Section of the Ukrainian SSR (1932–1959)
- Football Federation of the Ukrainian SSR (1959–1991)
- Football Federation of Ukraine (1991– May 2019)
- Ukrainian Football Association (May 2019 – present)

Old logo

New logo, adopted on 11 March 2016

==== First steps in football sport administration ====
The first governing body was created in summer of 1918 in Kharkiv as All-Ukrainian Football Union by its constituent assembly. The chairman of the Union became V. Agiton, while a secreatary-treasurer – B. Shifrin.

After the Bolshevik's occupation, in 1932 there was created the All-Ukrainian Football Section in Kharkiv and was part of the Ukrainian Council of Physical Culture that administered all types of sports. The first elected president was a Kharkiv football referee Oleksandr Yakovych Levitin who published a book "Game rules of football in questions and answers" (Ukrainian: "Правила гри у футбол у питаннях і відповідях"). In 1934 after the capital of the Ukrainian SSR was transferred from Kharkiv to Kyiv, there was moved the Council of Physical Culture along with its football section. Levitin was replaced for not being not really a correct person with another Kharkiv football specialist Ivan Serhiyovych Kosmachov.

On 27 December 1934, on resolution of the All-Union Council of Physical Culture (VSFK) of the Soviet Union, there was established Football-Hockey section as the higher public organization in administration of football in the country and had to help the VSFK. During that period there started a struggle between people's commissariats and trade union for the right to lead the physical culture movement. Trade unions started actively create volunteer sports societies (the first were "Spartak" and "Lokomotiv"). However, already in 1936 took place big changes when the VSKF that existed at the Central Executive Committee of the Soviet Union was liquidated and instead at the Council of People's Commissariats (Sovnarkom) was created the All-Union Committee in affairs of Physical Culture and Sports (VKFK) which also contained a department of football and hockey as well as the public Football Section. In Ukraine was created the Ukrainian Committee in affairs of Physical Culture and Sports (UKFK) at the Ukrainian Council of People's Commissars and quartered in Kyiv. The committee supervised 15 oblasts committees along with the Committee of Moldavian ASSR quartered in Tiraspol.

At the end of February 1937, at the Ukrainian Committee in affairs of Physical Culture and Sports was established the Football-Hockey Section which in mass media was better known as Football Section. The head of the section was appointed Samuyil Izepilyovych Khavchyn. With the Nazi Germany invasion of the Soviet Union, all Soviet government institutions were evacuated or liquidated. The Football-Hockey Section was reinstated in 1944 and headed by Stepan Dmytrovych Romanenko. In 1946 the VKFK was renamed into the Goskomsport (State Committee in affairs of Physical Culture and Sports) and a similar analogy took place in the Ukrainian SSR. In 1946 there took place a huge event when the Football-Hockey Section of Goskomsport of the Soviet Union was finally admitted to FIFA. In 1947 the Football Section separated from the Football-Hockey Section. In 1953 the Goskomsport was transferred to the Ministry of Healthcare as the Main Administration of Physical Culture and Sports, but the next year was reinstated once again. Due to such rapid changes, almost none of union republic were able adopt them therefore no changes ever took place at republican level.

In 1954, the Football Section became a founding member of the Union of European Football Associations. Within the Goskomsport, the football department was renamed into the Football Administration. In 1955 to the presidium of Football Section from the Ukrainian SSR was admitted Mykola Balakin.

=== Foundation in independent Ukraine ===
On 6 March 1991, thanks to Viktor Maksymovych Bannikov, the Football Federation of Ukraine (FFU) was established as part of the Football Federation of the Soviet Union (FFSU). However, it was still fully controlled and subordinated to Moscow's main governing body.

On 24 August 1991, the Ukrainian parliament (Verkhovna Rada) by its Act of Declaration of Independence of Ukraine expressed its intent of casting away from Soviet Union and create a sovereign state – Ukraine. After these events, the executive committee of Football Federation of the Ukrainian SSR decided to have a plenum at the beginning of December where the future of the growth of the national sport would be defined.

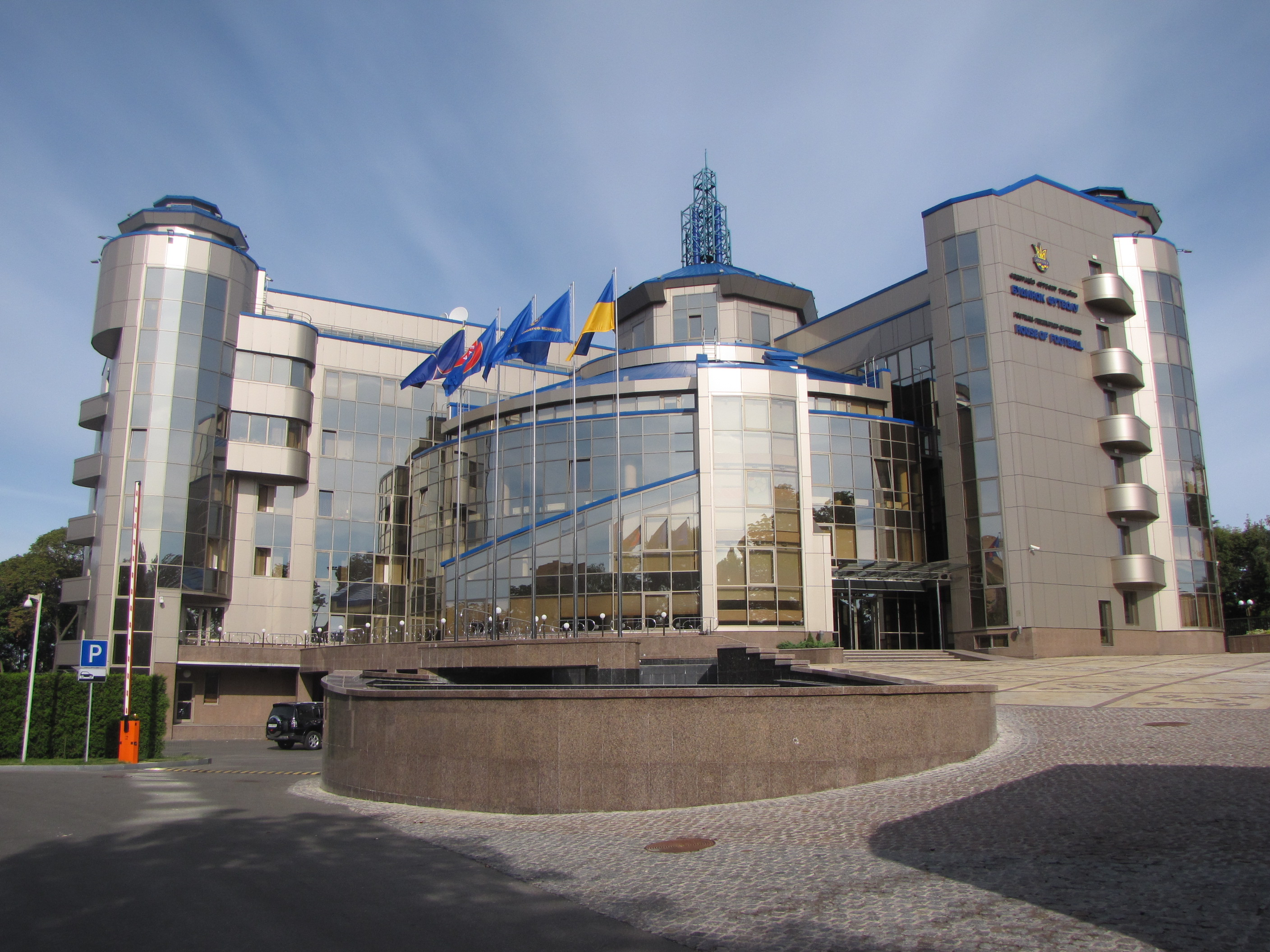
UAF Headquarters in Kyiv

However, until then, the following events took place that contributed to a certain degree of confusion.

- At the beginning of September, a joint conference of the governing body of the federation and the national football society took place where it was announced that internal institutes would subordinate to Moscow.
- In October a meeting between Viktor Bannikov and the president UEFA, Lennart Johansson, took place. The president of the European Football Union promised to fully support Ukraine in joining the European football organization.

About the fact that a new nation appeared on the world map, the world society recognized it on 1 December 1991 after the conduct of the All-national referendum. After all that, on 13 December in the big hall of the State Committee of Physical Culture and Sport (also later known as Ministry in affairs of the Youth, Sport, and Tourism), the Council of Federations in one voice accepted the following declaration:

In accordance with the All-national referendum of 1 December 1991, Ukraine has become an independent state. The Football Federation of Ukraine – sovereign, independent, public organization that does not belong to any federation of foreign states. The Federation takes full jurisdiction over the protection of the rights of players, coaches, and football specialists.

The Football Federation is responsible for upholding international norms and human rights without concern of a nationality or religious beliefs. The Football Federation confirms its adherence to the goals and principles of FIFA and UEFA statues affirms their execution.

The Football Federation of Ukraine has executed all its obligations to the Soviet Football Union and declares the cancellation of its membership.

— Football Federation of Ukraine, 13 December 1991

13 December is the day when the Football Federation of Ukraine was established.

Some time at the end of February 1992, the Agence France-Presse spread information that the FIFA, without waiting for its congress, granted the status of provisional members to national federations of Ukraine, Georgia, Slovenia, and Croatia. According to its commentary, that was made for the associations of those four countries in advance build their relations with football unions of other countries, and their footballers participate in friendlies of national team levels. Soon at address of the Football Federation of Ukraine arrived relevant official documents not only from FIFA, but from UEFA that were signed by general secretaries of those organizations, Sepp Blatter and Gerhard Aigner. In his interview in that regard the FFU first president Viktor Bannikov noted, "The relate to the powers of our federation on implementing of all transferring rights and participation of national and club teams in international competitions. Questions about such powers were placed before the relevant authorities during my stay in Zürich in mid February. On 24 February we sent a request to the FIFA asking for an answer. The returning fax did not make us wait long."

On 16 February 1992 there kicked off the 1992 Ukrainian Cup, which became the first football tournament among professional teams since Ukraine revived its independence. The first round of the 1992 Higher League was scheduled for 6–7 March 1992. On 29 April 1992, the FFU scheduled its first international friendly with the Hungary national football team.

The head coach of the national team was originally planned to be Valeriy Lobanovskyi, who at that time headed the UAE national football team. Viktor Bannikov did not fail to inform that to the shores of the Persian Gulf was sent an invitation on the address of the Maître of the domestic coaching corps, and Lobanovskyi gave prior agreement. But he will be ready to lead the Ukraine national football team only at the end of the term of the current contract, which at that time remained about a month. Thereby, the first coach of the national team had to be picked from the members of the coaching council that included Anatoliy Puzach (Dynamo), Yevhen Kucherevskyi (Dnipro), Yevhen Lemeshko (Torpedo), Yukhym Shkolnykov (Bukovyna), Viktor Prokopenko (Chornomorets), and somewhat later they were joined by Valeriy Yaremcheko (Shakhtar).

As mentioned by Yevhen Kotelnykov (vice-president at that time), the Ukrainian diaspora played a key role in helping the federation and the national team in particular from the very beginning. It was the diaspora that made it possible for the national team to play games in the United States.

In 1992, the FFU delegation received an invitation to participate in the 48th FIFA Congress that was scheduled to take place in Zürich at the beginning of July. At that forum, in particular, was to be reviewed an issue of accepting Ukraine and some other newly created countries as permanent members of the International federation. The relevant documents had already been reviewed at the FIFA headquarters and approved with minor remarks on four points. Sometime later, a personal invitation arrived for Viktor Bannikov to participate in an extraordinary session of the UEFA Executive Committee along with the committee on conducting continental tournaments. It was about granting our country a possibility already in the next season to present one team in each of the Eurocups, subject to the terms presented by the European Union, creation of an own league, availability of appropriate infrastructure to hold games of such levels, ensuring security while they are being held.

In turn, the FFU president offered the International Federation not to grant Russia the right to automatically inherit the place of the CIS national football team in the qualification cycle of the 1994 FIFA World Cup and to hold an additional tournament between national teams of former Soviet republics for the place in Group 5, already formed by a draw. The proposal was supported by Georgia and Armenia, but among Russians it caused an extremely negative reaction. For example, the RFU general secretary Vladimir Radionov accused the Ukrainian federation of scheming and regarded the idea of such a tournament as a legally unreasonable attempt "run ahead of a locomotive". At the same time, those neighbors of Ukraine were convinced that the rights of the former Union federation must be transferred to them. As a result, it happened, although until the last moment, particularly the FIFA Executive Committee meeting in Stockholm and the congress, Viktor Bannikov tried to stand his ground.

During the winter of 1995, new elections took place at the 2nd conference, and against Bannikov ran former goalkeeper Hennadiy Lysenchuk, but he lost.

At the XXII Congress in Zaporizhzhia, the Football Federation of Ukraine was renamed the Ukrainian Association of Football. For that decision voted 79 Congress delegates.

=== Russian invasion of Ukraine ===
The association announced the suspension of the Ukrainian Premier League on 24 February 2022, the day of Russia's invasion of Ukraine.

== Officials ==
=== Presidents ===
- Viktor Bannikov (December 1991 – July 1996)
- Valeriy Pustovoytenko (July 1996 – August 2000), Prime Minister of Ukraine from 16 July 1997 to 30 November 1999
- Hryhoriy Surkis (16 August 2000 – 2 September 2012), reelected in 2004 and 2007
- Anatoliy Konkov (2 September 2012 – 6 March 2015)
  - Andriy Pavelko (acting 26 January 2015 – 6 March 2015)
- Andriy Pavelko (6 March 2015 – 25 January 2024), reelected in 2017
  - since 13 March 2023 – 25 January 2024, presidential powers were suspended
  - Oleh Protasov (acting 11 May 2023 – 24 January 2024)
- Andriy Shevchenko (since 25 January 2024)

=== First vice-presidents ===
- Yevhen Kotelnykov
- Serhiy Storozhenko
- Anatoliy Bidenko
- Oleksandr Bandurko
- Vadym Kostyuchenko
- Ihor Kochetov
- Nazar Kholodnytskyi

=== Executive Committee ===
- Viktor Andrukhiv
- Viktor Bezsmertny
- Andriy Bondarenko
- Sergiy Vladyko
- Irek Hataullin
- Taras Herula

=== UEFA members from Ukraine ===
2023–2027

- Hryhoriy Surkis – honored president
- Andriy Pavelko – member of the UEFA Executive Committee, deputy chairman of the UEFA committee on youth and amateur football, deputy chairman of the UEFA committee on futsal and beach football
- Yuriy Zapisotskyi – second vice-deputy chairman of the UEFA clubs' licensing committee
- Oleksiy Mykhailychenko – member of the UEFA national teams committee
- Vadym Kostyuchenko – member of the UEFA committee of "Hat-trick program"
- Volodymyr Heninson – member of the UEFA committee on stadiums and security
- Oleh Protasov – member of the UEFA committee on football
- Ihor Hryshchenko – inspector on ethics and disciplinary issues
- Andriy Bondarenko – member of the UEFA expert group on administrative issues
- Oleksandr Kadenko – member of the UEFA expert group on issues of mass football

== Structure ==
=== Main governing institutions ===
The main decisions of all-national importance are discussed at the meetings of the Congress of Football Federation of Ukraine (FFU). Congress also elects the president and vice-presidents (presidential cabinet) of federation and confirms several football government bodies such as presidium, executive committee, appellation committee, and others. The congress is more of a legislative body of government and sets goals and directions for the development of football in the country. All official meetings of various football government institutions take place at the "Building of Football" (Budynok futbolu) in Kyiv.

All structural and organizational issues are executed by the Executive Committee (Vykonkom). The executive committee consists of about 30 people and includes the presidential cabinet of federation. To assist the executive committee there exists a presidium which organizes the meetings of the Vykonkom. The presidium composed of 16 people, among which are all the members of the presidential cabinet as well.

=== Committees and collective members ===
The federation also has two judicial bodies of government: the control disciplinary committee (KDK) and the appellation committee. Those are small committees and are confirmed by the congress of Football Federation of Ukraine.

Aside of the above-mentioned organizations there are numerous other committees and directorates that supplement in the organization of football events in Ukraine. Among the most important are the Committee of professional football, the Committee of national teams, the Committee of referees, the Expert Commission, the Council of a strategic development of professional football, and many others.

There are also collective members of federation that include various public organizations such as regional federation, student associations, independent leagues, travel agencies, others. The importance of collective members is that every single one of them can delegate up to three its representatives to the Congress and announce its own candidates on the position of the president.

=== Collective members ===
- Premier League of Ukraine
- Professional Football League of Ukraine
- Ukrainian Football Amateur Association (National championship among the regions, National cup)
- Association of football veterans
- Association of mini-football of Ukraine (Futsal)
- Association of beach football of Ukraine
- Football association of handicapped
- 27 regional football federations
- All-Ukrainian football association of students
- Children-Youth football league of Ukraine (Ukrainian National Youth Competition)
- League of Street Football
- Youth Football Union
- Committee of fitness education and sports of Ministry of Education
- Sports office of Ministry of Defense (CSK ZSU)
- Central Council of Sports Club "Spartak" of Trade-unions of Ukraine
- Central Council of Fitness Sports Club of Ukraine "Dynamo"
- Central Council of Fitness Sports Club of Ukraine "Kolos"
- Central Council of Fitness Sports Club "Ukraine"
- Association "Futbol-Zakhid"
- Association of referees of Ukraine
- Ukraina Football International
- Tourist agency "Sport Line Travel"
- Public association "Hrayemo za Ukrainu razom" (Play for Ukraine together)

=== Associated members ===
- Association of Women Football (Ukrainian Women's League, WFPL)

== Congresses ==
The list of recent congress meetings. Congresses take place every year. Each FFU collective member sends three delegates.

election year

| # | Elected president | Year | Activities |
|---|---|---|---|
| 9th | Hryhoriy Surkis | 2007 | For Surkis voted 129 out 137 delegates and presidential term is for 5 years; Surkis is confirmed as a delegate of the UEFA Euro 2012 final stage in Ukraine; Approved preparation plan for the UEFA Euro 2012 final stage; First deputies chairmen (Oleksandr Bandurko, Serhiy Storozhenko); Deputy chairmen Anatoliy Bidenko, Ihor Voronov, Borys Voskresenskyi, Oleksandr Hranovskyi, Ihor Kolomoiskyi, Volodymyr Lushkul, Ravil Safiullin, Serhiy Tatulian; Reshuffled FFU Executive Committee, FFU Presidium, FFU Control and Disciplinary Committee, FFU Appellation Committee; approved changes to the FFU organization's statute |
| 10th | Hryhoriy Surkis | 2008 | Reshuffle FFU Executive Committee; Ukrainian Premier League (UPL) admitted as a collective member; seat of FFU vice-president was reserved for UPL president; Substituted FFU vice-presidents: Svyatoslav Syrota for Ravil Safiullin; Minister of youth and sport promised beginning of construction of the Center of Olympic Preparation in team sports; Bandurko announced that Ukraine received top evaluation from UEFA as part of the Mass football charter; Head of the FFU Executive Directorate of Euro 2012 promised that the third stage of action plan should be completed in May 2009 |
| 12th | Hryhoriy Surkis | 2010 | Failed congress, agenda was not able to be established |
| 14th | Anatoliy Konkov (uncontested) | 2012 | all delegates (133) except one voted for Anatoliy Konkov as the president; presidential term reduced from 5 to 4 years; first vice-presidents: Anatoliy Popov, Serhiy Storozhenko, vice-presidents: Vitaliy Bohdanov, Volodymyr Marynovskyi, Andriy Pavelko |
| 16th | Anatoliy Konkov | 2014 | Authority was returned to 9 delegates who are part of the FFU collective members "Futbol-Zakhid" Association, Ukrainian Football Referee Association, Youth Football Union; Konkov announced about the next congress that will take place in 3 months on 6 March 2015; Working group in preparation to the next congress was created headed by Andriy Pavelko |
| 17th | Andriy Pavelko | 2015 | For Pavelko voted 122 delegates, 8 votes were for Ihor Kolomoyskyi and 7 – Yaroslav Hrysyo; Number of vice-presidents was increased from 3 to 7 |
| 18th | Andriy Pavelko | 2016 | Approved the new version of the statute |
| 20th | Andriy Pavelko (uncontested) | 2017 | For Pavelko voted 95 delegates and presidential term extended from 4 to 5 years; FFU was reorganized from public organization to public union and statute was changed; Increased number of first deputies chairmen from 2 to 3 (Bandurko, Kostyuchenko, Kholodnytskyi); Deputy chairmen (Oleksandr Hereha, Kostiantyn Yeliseyev, Maksym Yefimov, Ihor Kochetov, Serhiy Kunitsyn, Andriy Matsola, Yuriy Pochetnyi, Oleh Sobutskyi); Reshuffled FFU Executive Committee; Yuriy Zapysotkyi and Ihor Hryshchenko granted authority to realize FFU opportunities in various situations |
| 21st | Andriy Pavelko | 2018 | Reshuffled FFU Executive Committee; Replaced Oleksandr Bandurko with Oleh Protasov as the first vice-president |
| 26th | Andriy Shevchenko (uncontested) | 2024 | For Shevchenko voted 94 delegates out of 95, one abstained.; Number of vice-presidents was reduced (Pavlo Boichuk, Serhiy Rebrov, Oleksandr Shevchenko); UAF Executive Committee was reshuffled (Serhiy Vladyko, Oleksandr Kadenko, Yevhen Dykyi, Mykola Pavlov, Kateryna Monzul, Andriy Poltavets, Artem Stoyanov, Oleksandr Zinchenko) |

On 18 December 2014, in Kyiv took place the UAF Congress which expressed its vote of no confidence to president Anatoliy Konkov with "aye" 36 out of 47 collective members including 20 regional associations. The general director of FC Hoverla Uzhhorod, Ivan Shits, commented that some "collective members" are organizations of unknown origin.

Following another congress in 2015, the general director of FC Shakhtar Donetsk Serhiy Palkin called it "a fake" explaining that among collective members is a random traveling agency that has as many delegates to the congress as the Ukrainian Premier League.

== Fighting corruption ==
After German weekly news magazine "Der Spiegel" published its investigation titled "How did the UEFA payments get to the British Virgin Islands?" the UAF addressed the State Bureau of Investigations, Prosecutor General's Office and the Internal Ministry of Ukraine filing a claim that Hryhorii Surkis, former president of the Football Federation of Ukraine, has committed a criminal offence stealing hundreds of millions Euro.

According to "Der Spiegel", starting from 1999 (that is for almost 15 years) the UEFA has been transferring the money (in general €380 million) allocated for the Football Federation (now Ukrainian Association of Football) to Newport management Ltd. – an offshore entity.

This company is registered in the British Virgin Islands and, according to the publication, is controlled by Hryhorii Surkis, who had been chairing the FFU from 2000 till 2012, and who's been a member of the UEFA executive committee for more than 10 years until February 2019).

In March 2018 at the FFU Executive Committee the FFU first vice-president Oleksandr Bandurko was accused of wasting 2 million euros back in 2003 when he along with Hryhoriy Surkis announced construction of a training center for national team in suburb of Kyiv, Horenychi.

On 19 February 2020 Andriy Pavelko was forced to sign his letter of resignation as a chairman of the FIFA Disciplinary Committee.

In October 2022, owner of FC Rukh Lviv, Hryhoriy Kozlovskyi, accused the UAF president in the collapse of Ukrainian football.

On 29 November 2022 both the UAF president Andriy Pavelko and general secretary Yuriy Zapisotskyi were placed in jail on the order of the Pecherska District Courty of Kyiv City. Their bond was set to 9,880 thousands hryvnias.

On 17 February 2023 the Pechersk District Court of Kyiv City granted the request for removal from office the UAF president Andriy Pavelko. Earlier on 29 November 2022, Mr.Pavelko has been issued arrest by the court in connection with the disappearance of a million euros on a scheme with the construction of a factory of artificial coverings for football fields. Between 2018 and 2020, there were opened 12 criminal proceedings against Pavelko, but none were finalized. Coincidently Pavelko's lawyer is "kindred" (godparenting) with Artem Sytnyk (former National Anti-Corruption Bureau of Ukraine director).

On 13 March 2023, the Pechersk District Court of Kyiv City extended suspension of the Pavelko's powers as a president of UAF. Unlike the previous court order that was adopted earlier in February and later was appealed, the new one was adopted to be executed immediately. Later the suspension for Pavelko was extended by the Shevchenko District Court of Lviv City.

On 9 October 2023, the Zaporizhia Oblast Association of Football requested removal of Anatoliy Demyanenko from the office of UAF first vice-president and appointment of acting UAF general secretary. Soon thereafter two more regional football organizations (Zakarpattia Oblast and Kirovohrad Oblast) supported the request.

The Ukrainian Association of Football posted couple of explanatory articles about its offshore company and its factory in Kramatarosk.

== National teams ==
- Ukraine national football team
- Ukraine women's national football team
- Ukraine national under-21 football team (also known as the youth team, participates in qualifications for the Olympic tournament)
- Ukraine youth women national football team (under 19)
- Ukraine student football team
- Other national and junior football teams

National team tournaments

- Valeri Lobanovsky Memorial Tournament
- Viktor Bannikov Memorial Tournament
- Others

== See also ==
- Regional football federations of Ukraine
- FFU Committee of Referees
