= Football at the 1983 Spartakiad of the Peoples of the USSR =

1983 Spartakiad of Peoples of the USSR football tournament
Tournament details
- Host country: Russian SFSR
- Dates: 16 July – 3 August
- Teams: 17
- Venue: 4 (in 4 (Moscow, Ryazan, Tula, Ivanovo) host cities)

Final positions
- Champions: (Lithuanian Soviet Socialist Republic) Lithuanian SSR (1st title)
- Runners-up: (Russian Soviet Federative Socialist Republic) Russian SFSR
- Third place: Moscow
- Fourth place: (Ukrainian Soviet Socialist Republic) Ukrainian SSR

Tournament statistics
- Matches played: 58
- Goals scored: 177 (3.05 per match)

The football tournament at the 1983 Spartakiad of Peoples of the USSR was a preparatory competition for the Soviet Union Olympic football team among the Olympic reserves and the third football tournament at the Spartakiad of Peoples of the USSR. The competition took place on July 16 through August 3, 1983 as part of the Spartakiad of Peoples of the USSR. The football team of Moscow were the two-times defending champions.

The competition included footballers under 20 years of age (U-20, born between 1963 and 1965). All participating teams at first were split in four groups with top two team in each of them advancing to the next round forming two semifinal groups of four in each. Depending on their standing in their groups, teams would play off with another team that placed the same place in another group.

== Competition ==
=== Preliminary games ===
All times local (UTC+3)

Key to colours in group tables
Team progressed to the semifinals
Team progressed to the tournament of third places
Team progressed to the tournament of last places

Group 1 (Moscow)

Team	Pld	W	D	L	GF	GA	GD	Pts
Moscow	3	2	1	0	6	0	+6	5
(Russian Soviet Federative Socialist Republic) RSFSR	3	1	2	0	3	0	+3	4
(Kazakh Soviet Socialist Republic) Kazakhstan	3	1	1	1	6	2	+4	3
(Kirghiz Soviet Socialist Republic) Kyrgyzia	3	0	0	3	1	14	-13	0

Group 2 (Ryazan)

Team	Pld	W	D	L	GF	GA	GD	Pts
(Ukrainian Soviet Socialist Republic) Ukraine	3	3	0	0	11	1	+10	6
(Armenian Soviet Socialist Republic) Armenia	3	2	0	1	3	5	-2	4
(Uzbek Soviet Socialist Republic) Uzbekistan	3	1	0	2	3	6	-3	2
(Azerbaijan Soviet Socialist Republic) Azerbaijan	3	0	0	3	0	5	-5	0

Group 3 (Tula)

Team	Pld	W	D	L	GF	GA	GD	Pts
(Lithuanian Soviet Socialist Republic) Lithuania	4	2	1	1	8	3	+5	5
(Byelorussian Soviet Socialist Republic) Byelorussia	4	2	1	1	6	5	+1	5
(Turkmen Soviet Socialist Republic) Turkmenia	4	2	0	2	4	6	−2	4
(Estonian Soviet Socialist Republic) Estonia	4	2	0	2	7	6	+1	4
(Latvian Soviet Socialist Republic) Latvia	4	1	0	3	3	8	-5	2

Lithuania finished first ahead of Byelorussia based on their goal difference.
Turkmenia finished third ahead of Estonia based on their head-to-head match up.

18 July 1983
18:30

Latvian SSR	1 – 3	Belarusian SSR
Lange	Report	Panchik; Kriushenko ?', ?'

Metallurg Stadium, Tula
Attendance: 3,000
Referee: Kirill Doronin (Moscow)
20 July 1983
18:30

Estonian SSR	2 – 0	Belarusian SSR
Mytsnik ?', ?'	Report

Tulachermet Stadium, Tula
Attendance: 4,000
Referee: Myroslav Stupar (Ivano-Frankivsk)
22 July 1983
18:30

Turkmen SSR	1 – 2	Belarusian SSR
Menshikov	Report	Nastashevskiy; Metlitskiy; Kriushenko (red card) 25'

50th Anniversary of the Lenin's Komsomol Central Stadium, Tula
Attendance: 3,500
Referee: Viktor Fadeyev (Leningrad)
- Right after the game Anatoliy Komarov (Turkmen SSR) and Valeriy Loginov (Belarusian SSR) grabbed each other's jersey and shoved one another. On the way to locker rooms Anatoliy Komarov (Turkmen SSR) hit Igor Omelchenko (Turkmen SSR).
24 July 1983
18:30

Lithuanian SSR	1 – 1	Belarusian SSR
Levandrauskas	Report	Shalimo

50th Anniversary of the Lenin's Komsomol Central Stadium, Tula
Attendance: 5,500
Referee: Matevos Mkrtchian (Yerevan)

Group 4 (Ivanovo)

Team	Pld	W	D	L	GF	GA	GD	Pts
(Moldavian Soviet Socialist Republic) Moldavia	3	2	1	0	5	3	+2	4
(Georgian Soviet Socialist Republic) Georgia	3	2	0	1	4	3	+1	3
(Saint Petersburg) Leningrad	3	1	1	1	2	2	0	3
(Tajik Soviet Socialist Republic) Tajikistan	3	0	0	3	2	5	-3	2

=== Semifinals groups ===
Group A (Moscow)

Team	Pld	W	D	L	GF	GA	GD	Pts
(Lithuanian Soviet Socialist Republic) Lithuania	3	2	1	0	5	2	+3	5
Moscow	3	1	2	0	8	5	+3	4
(Georgian Soviet Socialist Republic) Georgia	3	0	2	1	5	6	-1	2
(Armenian Soviet Socialist Republic) Armenia	3	0	1	2	2	7	-5	1

Group B (Ryazan)

Team	Pld	W	D	L	GF	GA	GD	Pts
(Russian Soviet Federative Socialist Republic) RSFSR	3	2	1	0	3	1	+2	5
(Ukrainian Soviet Socialist Republic) Ukraine	3	2	0	1	7	2	+5	4
(Byelorussian Soviet Socialist Republic) Byelorussia	3	1	1	1	2	4	−2	3
(Moldavian Soviet Socialist Republic) Moldavia	3	0	0	3	1	6	-5	0

27 July 1983
18:30

Ukrainian SSR	3 – 0	Belarusian SSR
Lytovchenko; Protasov; Yakovenko	Report

Spartak Stadium, Ryazan
Attendance: 3,500
Referee: Velodi Miminoshvili (Tbilisi)
29 July 1983
18:30

Moldavian SSR	0 – 1	Belarusian SSR
	Report	Metlitsky

CSK Stadium, Ryazan
Attendance: 1,200
Referee: Anatoliy Kadetov (Moscow)
31 July 1983
18:30

Russian SFSR	1 – 1	Belarusian SSR
Sosulin	Report	Metlitsky (pen.)

Spartak Stadium, Ryazan
Attendance: 5,000
Referee: Velodi Miminoshvili (Tbilisi)

=== Final playoffs ===
- 7th place playoff (Tula). Moldavian SSR – Armenian SSR 3:2
- 5th place playoff (Ryazan). Georgian SSR – Byelorussian SSR 2:2, pen. 8:7
- 3rd place playoff (Moscow). Moscow – Ukrainian SSR 1:1, pen. 3:1
- 1st place playoff (Moscow). Lithuanian SSR – RSFSR 1:0
3 August 1983
18:30

Georgian SSR	2 – 2 (a.e.t.)	Belarusian SSR
Chelidze; Arziani; Guruli (red card) 57'	Report	Kriushenko; Metlitsky; Rodnyonok (red card) 57'; Panchik (red card) 60'
Penalties
	8 – 7

CSK Stadium, Ryazan
Attendance: 4,027
Referee: Romualdas Juška (Vilnius)
3 August 1983

Lithuanian SSR	1 – 0	Russian SFSR
Levandrauskas 49'	[ Report]

V.I.Lenin Central Stadium, Moscow
Attendance: 6,100
Referee: Kirill Doronin (Moscow)

== Teams composition ==
=== Moscow ===
- Head coach: Viktor Razumovskiy
- Assistant coach: Vladimir Neboronov

No.	Pos.	Player	Date of birth (age)	Caps	Goals	Club
1	GK	Yuri Shishkin	9 January 1963 (aged 20)	7	0	(Football Federation of the Soviet Union) CSKA Moscow
2	DF	Dmitri Galiamin	8 January 1963 (aged 20)	5	0	(Football Federation of the Soviet Union) CSKA Moscow
3	DF	Valeriy Popelnukha	6 April 1963 (aged 20)	1	0	(Football Federation of the Soviet Union) Spartak Moscow
4	DF	Vladimir Demidov	19 January 1964 (aged 19)	6	0	(Football Federation of the Soviet Union) Dynamo Moscow
5	DF	Igor Bulanov	15 November 1963 (aged 19)	7	3	(Football Federation of the Soviet Union) Dynamo Moscow
6	FW	Sergei Basov	4 March 1963 (aged 20)	4	1	(Football Federation of the Soviet Union) CSKA Moscow
7	MF	Igor Kurakin	9 April 1963 (aged 20)	7	1	(Football Federation of the Soviet Union) CSKA Moscow
8	FW	Sergei Argudyayev	11 January 1963 (aged 20)	7	5	(Football Federation of the Soviet Union) Spartak Moscow
9	MF	Vladimir Grechnyov	25 July 1964 (aged 19)	6	2	(Football Federation of the Soviet Union) CSKA Moscow
10	FW	Mikhail Rusyayev	15 November 1964 (aged 18)	7	2	(Football Federation of the Soviet Union) Spartak Moscow
11	FW	Viktor Zemlin	24 January 1964 (aged 19)	5	1	(Football Federation of the Soviet Union) CSKA Moscow
12	DF	Almir Kayumov	30 December 1964 (aged 18)	6	0	(Football Federation of the Soviet Union) Spartak Moscow
13	DF	Vladimir Korolyov	20 May 1965 (aged 18)	4	0	(Football Federation of the Soviet Union) Spartak Moscow
14	FW	Viktor Solomatin	7 January 1964 (aged 19)	4	0	(Football Federation of the Soviet Union) Torpedo Moscow
15	MF	Aleksandr Kuznetsov	14 January 1964 (aged 19)	5	0	(Football Federation of the Soviet Union) Dynamo Moscow
16	GK	Vadim Kirillov	9 September 1964 (aged 18)	0	0	(Football Federation of the Soviet Union) Lokomotiv Moscow
17	MF	Andrey Lebedev	2 January 1963 (aged 20)	4	0	(Football Federation of the Soviet Union) Lokomotiv Moscow
18	MF	Sergei Glubokov	26 February 1963 (aged 20)	2	0	(Football Federation of the Soviet Union) FShM Moscow
19	MF	Andrey Afanasyev	15 May 1964 (aged 19)	6	0	(Football Federation of the Soviet Union) CSKA Moscow
20	DF	Gocha Tkebuchava	24 November 1963 (aged 19)	5	0	(Football Federation of the Soviet Union) Dynamo Moscow

=== Russian SFSR ===
- Head coach: Anzor Kavazashvili
- Assistant coach: Nikolai Smirnov

No.	Pos.	Player	Date of birth (age)	Caps	Goals	Club
1	GK	Aleksandr Zhidkov	16 March 1965 (aged 18)			(Football Federation of the Soviet Union) Atommash Volgodonsk
2	MF	Andrei Vityuk	5 February 1964 (aged 19)			(Football Federation of the Soviet Union) Dynamo Kashira
3	MF	Shamil Isayev	19 March 1964 (aged 19)			(Football Federation of the Soviet Union) Uralan Elista
4	DF	Vyacheslav Kobzev	9 December 1963 (aged 19)			(Football Federation of the Soviet Union) Krylya Sovetov Kuybyshev
5	DF	Sergei Kozhanov	21 July 1964 (aged 19)			(Football Federation of the Soviet Union) Dynamo Makhachkala
6	FW	Grigoriy Medinskiy	28 July 1963 (aged 20)			(Football Federation of the Soviet Union) Zvezda Perm
7	MF	Vadim Sosulin	18 March 1963 (aged 20)			(Football Federation of the Soviet Union) Dynamo Barnaul
8	MF	Valeriy Stropilov	12 March 1963 (aged 20)			(Football Federation of the Soviet Union) Zenit Izhevsk
9	MF	Oleg Podruzhko	14 May 1964 (aged 19)			(Football Federation of the Soviet Union) Stroitel Cherepovets
10	MF	Oleg Mirny	8 April 1963 (aged 20)			(Football Federation of the Soviet Union) Druzhba Maykop
11	DF	Yuri Klyuchnikov	20 April 1963 (aged 20)			(Football Federation of the Soviet Union) Sokol Saratov
12	MF	Valery Zazdravnykh	8 July 1963 (aged 20)			(Football Federation of the Soviet Union) Dynamo Stavropol
13	FW	Valeri Shmarov	23 February 1965 (aged 18)			(Football Federation of the Soviet Union) Fakel Voronezh
14	DF	Sergey Dikarev	29 June 1963 (aged 20)			(Football Federation of the Soviet Union) Svetotekhnika Saransk
15	MF	Mikhail Aleksandrov	26 August 1963 (aged 19)			(Football Federation of the Soviet Union) Tekstilshchik Ivanovo
16	GK	Yevgeni Kryukov	3 August 1963 (aged 20)			(Football Federation of the Soviet Union) Kuzbass Kemerovo
17	DF	Sergei Ushakov	27 April 1965 (aged 18)			(Football Federation of the Soviet Union) Dynamo Stavropol
18	FW	Sergei Cherepanov	10 February 1963 (aged 20)			(Football Federation of the Soviet Union) Zenit Izhevsk
19	MF	Igor Shlyubul	4 February 1963 (aged 20)			(Football Federation of the Soviet Union) Kuban Krasnodar
20	MF	Aleksei Yeryomenko	17 January 1964 (aged 19)			(Football Federation of the Soviet Union) SKA Rostov-na-Donu

=== Kyrgyz SSR ===
- Head coach: Nikolai Razumets
- Assistant coach: Yusup Musayev

No.	Pos.	Player	Date of birth (age)	Caps	Goals	Club
1	GK	S. Safonov				(Football Federation of the Soviet Union) Spartak Frunze
2		A. Dzhamshidov				(Football Federation of the Soviet Union) Burevestnik Frunze
3		I. Ilyin				(Football Federation of the Soviet Union) Alga Talas
4		Sh. Zakirov				(Football Federation of the Soviet Union) Burevestnik Kochkor-Ata
5		A. Ivliyev				(Football Federation of the Soviet Union) Burevestnik Frunze
6	MF	Vitaliy Rogovanov	20 June 1965 (aged 18)			(Football Federation of the Soviet Union) Spartak Suluktu
7	FW	Tagir Fasakhov	16 January 1964 (aged 19)			(Football Federation of the Soviet Union) Spartak Osh
8	MF	Ruslan Adzhiev	25 July 1963 (aged 20)			(Football Federation of the Soviet Union) Dynamo Frunze
9		M. Eshaliev				(Football Federation of the Soviet Union) Burevestnik Frunze
10	FW	Andrei Guzienko	15 April 1964 (aged 19)			(Football Federation of the Soviet Union) Burevestnik Frunze
11		E.Malinovskiy				(Football Federation of the Soviet Union) Dynamo Frunze
12		Kh. Khaitbayev				(Football Federation of the Soviet Union) Burevestnik Przhevalsk
13		N. Sabitov				(Football Federation of the Soviet Union) Burevestnik Frunze
14		A. Bazarbayev				(Football Federation of the Soviet Union) Spartak Kök-Janggak
15		A. Primberdyyev				(Football Federation of the Soviet Union) Spartak Osh
16		R. Amirov				(Football Federation of the Soviet Union) Dynamo Frunze
17		A. Yuldashev				(Football Federation of the Soviet Union) Spartak Kara-Suu
18		Gennadiy Smirnov				(Football Federation of the Soviet Union) Burevestnik Frunze
19		A. Bats				(Football Federation of the Soviet Union) Spartak N-Chuysk
20		Tolchin Tashmatov				(Football Federation of the Soviet Union) Burevestnik Frunze

=== Kazakh SSR ===
- Head coach: Yevgeniy Kuznetsov
- Assistant coach: T. Nurmahambetov

No.	Pos.	Player	Date of birth (age)	Caps	Goals	Club
1	GK	Sergei Burakov	14 April 1963 (aged 20)			(Football Federation of the Soviet Union) Kairat Alma-Ata
2		S. Savin				(Football Federation of the Soviet Union) Kairat Alma-Ata
3	DF	Vladimir Pedora	22 April 1964 (aged 19)			(Football Federation of the Soviet Union) Kairat Alma-Ata
4	DF	Vladimir Fedchenko	14 July 1964 (aged 19)			(Football Federation of the Soviet Union) Vostok Ust-Kamenogorsk
5	DF	Evgeny Yarovenko	17 August 1963 (aged 19)			(Football Federation of the Soviet Union) Khimik Dzhambul
6	FW	Albert Shatskiy	3 February 1963 (aged 20)			(Football Federation of the Soviet Union) Vostok Ust-Kamenogorsk
7	MF	Ivan Azovskiy	1 October 1964 (aged 18)			(Football Federation of the Soviet Union) Kairat Alma-Ata
8		A. Kushykbayev				(Football Federation of the Soviet Union) Kairat Alma-Ata
9	FW	Yuriy Naydovskiy	10 April 1963 (aged 20)			(Football Federation of the Soviet Union) Kairat Alma-Ata
10	MF	Fanas Salimov	19 February 1964 (aged 19)			(Football Federation of the Soviet Union) Kairat Alma-Ata
11	MF	Eduard Son	18 August 1964 (aged 18)			(Football Federation of the Soviet Union) Kairat Alma-Ata
12	DF	Mykola Zaitsev	19 January 1964 (aged 19)			(Football Federation of the Soviet Union) Kairat Alma-Ata
13		V. Korobov				(Football Federation of the Soviet Union) Ekibastuzets Ekibastuz
14		O. Dodonov				(Football Federation of the Soviet Union) Kairat Alma-Ata
15		A. Ignatchenko				(Football Federation of the Soviet Union) SKIF Alma-Ata
16	GK	Aleksandr Khudobin	21 March 1964 (aged 19)			(Football Federation of the Soviet Union) SKIF Alma-Ata
17		V. Asylbayev				(Football Federation of the Soviet Union) Shakhter Karagandy
18	DF	Sergei Pasko	10 September 1966 (aged 16)			(Football Federation of the Soviet Union) Kairat Alma-Ata
19		K. Sarsekov				(Football Federation of the Soviet Union) Kairat Alma-Ata
20		I. Tyurin				(Football Federation of the Soviet Union) Shakhter Karagandy

=== Ukrainian SSR ===
- Head coach: Yevhen Kotelnykov
- Assistant coach: Vitaliy Khmelnytskyi

No.	Pos.	Player	Date of birth (age)	Caps	Goals	Club
1	GK	Valeriy Palamarchuk	11 August 1963 (aged 19)			(Football Federation of the Soviet Union) Chernomorets Odessa
2	DF	Serhiy Kuznetsov	1 January 1963 (aged 20)			(Football Federation of the Soviet Union) Metallist Kharkov
3	DF	Yevhen Drahunov	13 February 1964 (aged 19)			(Football Federation of the Soviet Union) SKA Kiev
4	DF	Vadym Karatayev	15 January 1964 (aged 19)			(Football Federation of the Soviet Union) Dynamo Kyiv
5	DF	Volodymyr Horilyi	11 October 1965 (aged 17)			(Football Federation of the Soviet Union) Tavriya Simferopol
6	MF	Hennadiy Lytovchenko	11 September 1963 (aged 19)			(Football Federation of the Soviet Union) Dnepr Dnepropetrovsk
7	MF	Ihor Petrov	30 January 1964 (aged 19)			(Football Federation of the Soviet Union) Shakhter Donetsk
8	MF	Serhiy Protsyuk	7 February 1963 (aged 20)			(Football Federation of the Soviet Union) Dynamo Kyiv
9	FW	Oleh Protasov	4 February 1964 (aged 19)			(Football Federation of the Soviet Union) Dnepropetrovsk
10	MF	Volodymyr Koman	20 February 1964 (aged 19)			(Football Federation of the Soviet Union) Dynamo Kyiv
11	MF	Pavlo Yakovenko	19 December 1964 (aged 18)			(Football Federation of the Soviet Union) Dynamo Kyiv
12	MF	Oleksiy Mykhaylychenko	30 March 1963 (aged 20)			(Football Federation of the Soviet Union) Dynamo Kyiv
13	FW	Vyacheslav Lendel	28 June 1963 (aged 20)			(Football Federation of the Soviet Union) SKA Karpaty Lvov
14	MF	Yuriy Hulyayev	25 August 1963 (aged 19)			(Football Federation of the Soviet Union) Tavriya Simferopol
15	DF	Serhiy Tretyak	7 September 1963 (aged 19)			(Football Federation of the Soviet Union) SKA Odessa
16	GK	Ihor Rutkovskyi	28 March 1963 (aged 20)			(Football Federation of the Soviet Union) SKA Karpaty Lvov
17	MF	Oleksandr Spitsyn	22 August 1963 (aged 19)			(Football Federation of the Soviet Union) Metallurg Zaporozhye
18	DF	Sergei Gerusov	4 January 1965 (aged 18)			(Football Federation of the Soviet Union) Shakhter Donetsk
19		Oleh Yarytskyi				(Football Federation of the Soviet Union) Podolie Khmelnitskiy
20		Yaroslav Dmytruk	6 September 1964 (aged 18)			(Football Federation of the Soviet Union) Avangard Rovno

=== Belarusian SSR ===
- Head coach: Gennadiy Abramovich
- Assistant coach: Veniamin Arzamastsev

No.	Pos.	Player	Date of birth (age)	Caps	Goals	Club
1	GK	Andrey Lyubchenko	13 July 1963 (aged 20)			(Football Federation of the Soviet Union) Dvina Vitebsk
2	DF	Nikolay Nastashevskiy	23 May 1963 (aged 20)			(Football Federation of the Soviet Union) Dnepr Mogilev
3	DF	Valeriy Panchik	10 July 1963 (aged 20)			(Football Federation of the Soviet Union) Dnepr Mogilev
4	DF	Vadim Rogovskoy	6 February 1962 (aged 21)			(Football Federation of the Soviet Union) Obuvschik Lida
5	DF	Aleksandr Voynakh	4 January 1963 (aged 20)			(Football Federation of the Soviet Union) Dinamo Minsk
6	MF	Gennadiy Rotkovich	2 February 1963 (aged 20)			(Football Federation of the Soviet Union) Dinamo Brest
7	MF	Aleksandr Metlitskiy	22 April 1964 (aged 19)			(Football Federation of the Soviet Union) Dinamo Minsk
8	MF	Anatoliy Vasilenko				(Football Federation of the Soviet Union) Dinamo Minsk
9	FW	Viktor Naumov	16 August 1965 (aged 17)			(Football Federation of the Soviet Union) Dnepr Mogilev
10	FW	Igor Kriushenko	10 February 1964 (aged 19)			(Football Federation of the Soviet Union) Dinamo Minsk
11	FW	Andrey Shalimo	24 October 1964 (aged 18)			(Football Federation of the Soviet Union) Dinamo Minsk
12	MF	Aleksandr Bruzgo	18 February 1963 (aged 20)			(Football Federation of the Soviet Union) Khimik Grodno
13	FW	Sergei Teplyakov	25 January 1965 (aged 18)			(Football Federation of the Soviet Union) Dnepr Mogilev
14	FW	Valeriy Loginov	8 May 1964 (aged 19)			(Football Federation of the Soviet Union) Khimik Grodno
15	DF	Pavel Rodnyonok	30 July 1964 (aged 19)			(Football Federation of the Soviet Union) Dinamo Minsk
16	GK	Andrey Grishin	22 April 1964 (aged 19)			(Football Federation of the Soviet Union) Burevestnik Minsk
17	MF	Valeriy Lapitskiy	10 July 1964 (aged 19)			(Football Federation of the Soviet Union) Gomselmash Gomel
18	DF	Stanislav Zinkovich	20 February 1965 (aged 18)			(Football Federation of the Soviet Union) Dinamo Minsk
19	MF	Viktor Tarchilo	22 March 1965 (aged 18)			(Football Federation of the Soviet Union) Burevestnik Minsk
20	DF	Aleksandr Gerasimuk	21 January 1965 (aged 18)			(Football Federation of the Soviet Union) Dinamo Brest

=== Georgian SSR ===
- Head coach: Vladimir Eloshvili
- Assistant coach: Andrey Zazroyev

No.	Pos.	Player	Date of birth (age)	Caps	Goals	Club
1	GK	Vepkhia Gventsadze				(Football Federation of the Soviet Union) Dinamo Tbilisi
2		Gela Ketashvili				(Football Federation of the Soviet Union) Torpedo Kutaisi
3		Georgiy Dochia				(Football Federation of the Soviet Union) Dinamo Tbilisi
4		Nodar Chelidze				(Football Federation of the Soviet Union) Torpedo Kutaisi
5		Malkhaz Arziani				(Football Federation of the Soviet Union) Kolkheti Poti
6		Vissarion Chedia				(Football Federation of the Soviet Union) Dinamo Tbilisi
7		Nugzar Mikaberidze				(Football Federation of the Soviet Union) Dinamo Tbilisi
8		Vasiliy Shengelia				(Football Federation of the Soviet Union) Lokomotiv Samtredia
9		Gocha Gogrichiani				(Football Federation of the Soviet Union) Dinamo Tbilisi
10		Gia Guruli				(Football Federation of the Soviet Union) Dinamo Tbilisi
11		Levan Baratashvili				(Football Federation of the Soviet Union) Dinamo Tbilisi
12		Dmitriy Kudinov				(Football Federation of the Soviet Union) Dinamo Tbilisi
13		Soso Malania				(Football Federation of the Soviet Union) Dinamo Sukhumi
14		Tengiz Logua				(Football Federation of the Soviet Union) Dinamo Tbilisi
15		David Sanikidze				(Football Federation of the Soviet Union) Guria Lanchkhuti
16		Zurab Chochiev				(Football Federation of the Soviet Union) Dila Gori
17		David Ugrelidze				(Football Federation of the Soviet Union) Guria Lanchkhuti
18		Malkhaz Makharadze				(Football Federation of the Soviet Union) Dinamo Tbilisi
19		Tengiz Murdzikneli				(Football Federation of the Soviet Union) Dinamo Tbilisi
20		Grigoriy Geradze				(Football Federation of the Soviet Union) Lokomotiv Samtredia
