= Alla Bruletova =

Russian model (born 1999)

- Born: 15 September 1999 (age 27); Ivanovo, Russia
- Occupations: model, blogger and TikTok creator
- Height: 1.58 m (5.2 ft)

Alla Bruletova (born 15 September 1999) is a Russian model, blogger and TikTok creator. In July 2023, she received prominence for a video she published with Bentley for a Jet Car dealership.

== Early life and education ==
Alla Bruletova was born in Ivanovo, Russia. As a child, she did gymnastics and was a candidate for the Cheerleading Master of Sports. Her modelling career began at 13 years old; when she was 17, she moved to Moscow and enrolled at RANEPA (Russian Presidential Academy of National Economy and Public Administration) in their Department of Journalism. After she left the academy, she studied at Herman Sedakov's acting school followed by courses from the Norwegian film company Amedia. Bruletova then got an offer from Avant Models, a Moscow-based model agency. Bruletova's portfolio includes work for Lamoda, Gloria Jeans, TVOE and other Russian brands.

== Career ==
At the age of 19, Bruletova met a video-blogger named Huseyn Gasanov. Her first videos were published in 2018 and covered make-up, food and nature. Gasanov helped Bruletova hire cameramen and editors, and she steadily started to earn money independently from commercials. In 2020, Bruletova got into Hype House TikTok collab house, which was supervised by Zair Yusupov; she worked there for a year and a half. Bruletova then changed her video plots to be related to cars; her first videos were described as plain, but soon she started filming cars and races reviews. She launched her own clothing-line brand for women called 'LookForever'. The project has since been closed.

In July 2023 her infamous Bentley video was released, because of which she became known to a broad audience. The video went viral, receiving five million views within a week. And with that video, she became nicknamed as "Bentley Girl" by most social media users. Bruletova participated in the game show Fear Factor; she has also appeared as minor characters in the Russian TV series Unprincipled and Ivanko.

Alla Bruletova modeled at fashion walks such as Diesel in Tokyo, Casablanca and Miu Miu in Paris, Roberto Cavalli in Dubai as well as at Milan Fashion Week for Guess, Prada and Ray-Ban. Her work also has been featured in magazines such as Elle Slovenia, Harper's Bazaar in Serbia and Greece, as well as Numero Netherlands. In 2025 she participated in a shoot for the Fanci Club brand. In 2025 she took part in the filming of the Fancy Club for the Polish Vogue magazine. That same year, she starred in the new issue of Portuguese Vogue magazine.
