= Andrei Lebedev =

Andrei Lebedev or Andrey Lebedev may refer to:

- Andžejs Ļebedevs (born 4 November 1994), Latvian speedway rider
- Andrey Lebedev (art historian) (1908–1993)
- Andrey Lebedev (footballer) (b. 1963), Soviet and Russian footballer
- Andrey Lebedzew (b. 1991), Belarusian footballer
