= Ivanovo State Polytechnic University =

Technical university in Ivanovo, Russia

Coordinates: 57.00030°N 40.98454°E

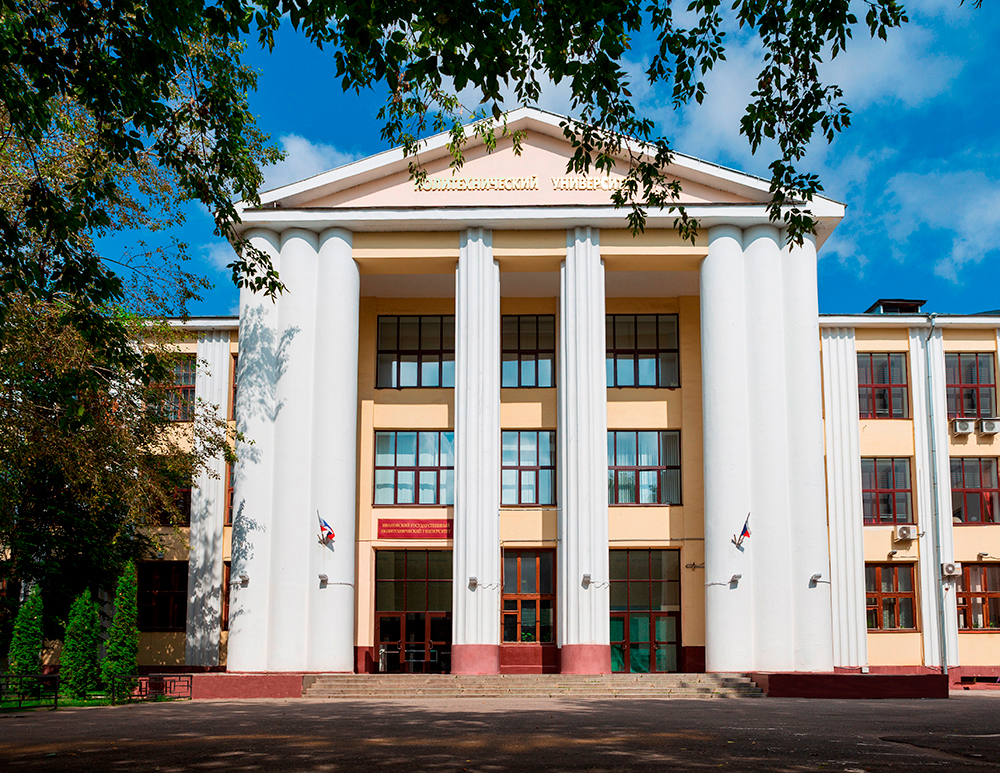
- Other names: ISPU
- Established: 2012
- President: Rumyantsev Evgeniy Vladimirovich
- Location: Sheremetevsky Avenue, Building 21, Ivanovo, Russia
- Website: ivgpu.com

Ivanovo State Polytechnic University (ISPU) is a technical university in Ivanovo, Russia. ISPU was established in 2012 by merging Ivanovo State University of Architecture and Civil Engineering and Ivanovo State Textile Academy.

ISPU has over 3,000 students from 21 regions of the Russian Federation and 17 foreign countries. The teaching staff is formed by more than 250 scientific and pedagogical workers, over 85% of them having scientific degrees of Candidates or Doctors of sciences.

== Educational programs ==
Higher educational programs – bachelor or specialist programs:

Bachelor's degree (full-time study)
Code	Program
07.03.01	Architecture
08.03.01	Civil Engineering
09.03.02	Information systems and technologies
11.03.01	Radio engineering
15.03.02	Technological machines and equipment
20.03.01	Technosphere Safety
22.03.01	Materials Science and Materials Technology
23.03.01	Technology of transport processes
27.03.01	Quality management
28.03.02	Nanoengineering
29.03.02	Technology and design of textile products
38.03.01	Economy
38.03.02	Management
38.03.05	Business Informatics
38.03.07	Commodity science
38.03.10	Housing and utilities infrastructure
54.03.01	Design
54.03.03	The art of costume and textiles
Bachelor's degree (part-time study)
07.03.01	Architecture
08.03.01	Civil Engineering
09.03.02	Information systems and technologies
29.03.05	Design of light industry products
38.03.01	Economy
38.03.02	Management
38.03.05	Business Informatics
38.03.10	Housing and utilities infrastructure
Bachelor's degree (correspondence study)
08.03.01	Civil Engineering
11.03.01	Radio engineering
15.03.04	Automation of technological processes and industries
23.03.02	Ground transportation and technological complexes
23.03.03	Exploitation of transport and technological machines and complexes
38.03.01	Economy
38.03.02	Management
38.03.07	Commodity science
38.03.10	Housing and utilities infrastructure
Specialist's degree (full-time study)
38.05.02	Customs Service
Specialist's degree (correspondence study)
08.05.02	Construction, operation, reconstruction and technical protection of highways, bridges and tunnels
20.05.01	Fire safety
Master's degree (full-time study)
07.04.01	Architecture
08.04.01	Civil Engineering
15.04.02	Technological machines and equipment
15.04.04	Automation of technological processes and industries
23.04.03	Exploitation of transport and technological machines and complexes
27.04.01	Standardization and metrology
27.04.02	Quality management
29.04.02	Technology and design of textile products
29.04.05	Design of light industry products
38.04.01	Economy
38.04.02	Management
Master's degree (part-time study)
08.04.01	Civil Engineering
38.04.01	Economy
38.04.02	Management
38.04.06	Commerce
38.04.07	Commodity science
Master's degree (correspondence study)
08.04.01	Civil Engineering
38.04.01	Economy
38.04.02	Management

Postgraduate programs for training scientific and pedagogical staff

Code	Direction of training
08.06.01	Construction Methods and Technologies
15.06.01	Machine building
18.06.01	Chemical Technology
29.06.01	Technologies of light industry

Training in professions and specialties of secondary vocational education

Training of skilled workers and employees (full-time study) (Institute of Continuing Vocational Education of ISPU)
Code	Direction of training
08.01.08	Master of finishing and construction works
15.01.05	Welder (electric welding and gas welding works)
23.01.17	Car repair and maintenance specialist
29.01.08	Operator of sewing equipment
Training of mid-level specialists (full-time study) (Institute of Continuing Vocational Education of ISPU)
08.02.01	Construction and operation of buildings and structures
15.02.01	Installation and technical operation of industrial equipment
23.02.03	Maintenance and repair of motor transport
Training of mid-level specialists (part-time study) (Branch of ISPU in the town of Vichuga)
15.02.01	Installation and technical operation of industrial equipment (on branches)
15.02.07	Automation of technological processes and industries
29.02.04	Design, modeling and technology of garments
29.02.05	Technology of textile products
38.02.01	Economics and accounting (on branches)
38.02.04	Commerce (on branches)

== Dissertation councils ==
Candidate's (PhD) and doctoral dissertations are defended in two specialized thesis boards.

== Research activity ==
The scientific research of the university is carried out within the framework of 19 main research areas corresponding to the prioritized scientific tendencies of development, technology and engineering in the Russian Federation.

The basis of the scientific, innovation and production infrastructure of ISPU:

- Five research and educational centers established in partnership with manufacturing companies and the Institute of Solution Chemistry of the Russian Academy of Sciences;
- three small innovative enterprises;
- dozens of scientific laboratories;
- publishing house and a section of instant printing;
- a complex of museum, exhibition and resource centers.

== Engineering center of textile and light industry (IC TLI) ==
IC TLI was established in 2014 as a result of the corporate reconstruction of the Department of Innovation activities of ISPU. In the same year, the IC TLI became the winner of the public competition of the Ministry of Education and Science and the Ministry of Industry and Trade of the Russian Federation for granting state support to pilot projects for the creation and development of engineering centers on the basis of educational institutions of higher vocational level.

== University infrastructure ==
The structure of the ISPU includes:

- five educational buildings;
- two campus hostels;
- library, the book fund of which has more than 1 million book units;
- sports facilities complex;
- recreation center in the town of Plyos.

== Campus ==
The distribution of places in dormitories is carried out by the departments of the university.

== Scientific conferences ==
The international scientific and practical forum SMARTEX has been held since 1998 in cooperation with the Institute of Solution Chemistry of the Russian Academy of Sciences. Within the Regional Festival "Young Science contribution to the Development of the Ivanovo Region", ISPU holds an interregional (with international participation) youth scientific and technical conference "Young Scientists contribution to the Development of the National Engineering Initiative" ("SEARCH") and interregional scientific and practical seminar "Genesis of Economic and social problems of economic entities in Russia".

== Recreation center ==
The country recreation center is located in Plyos.

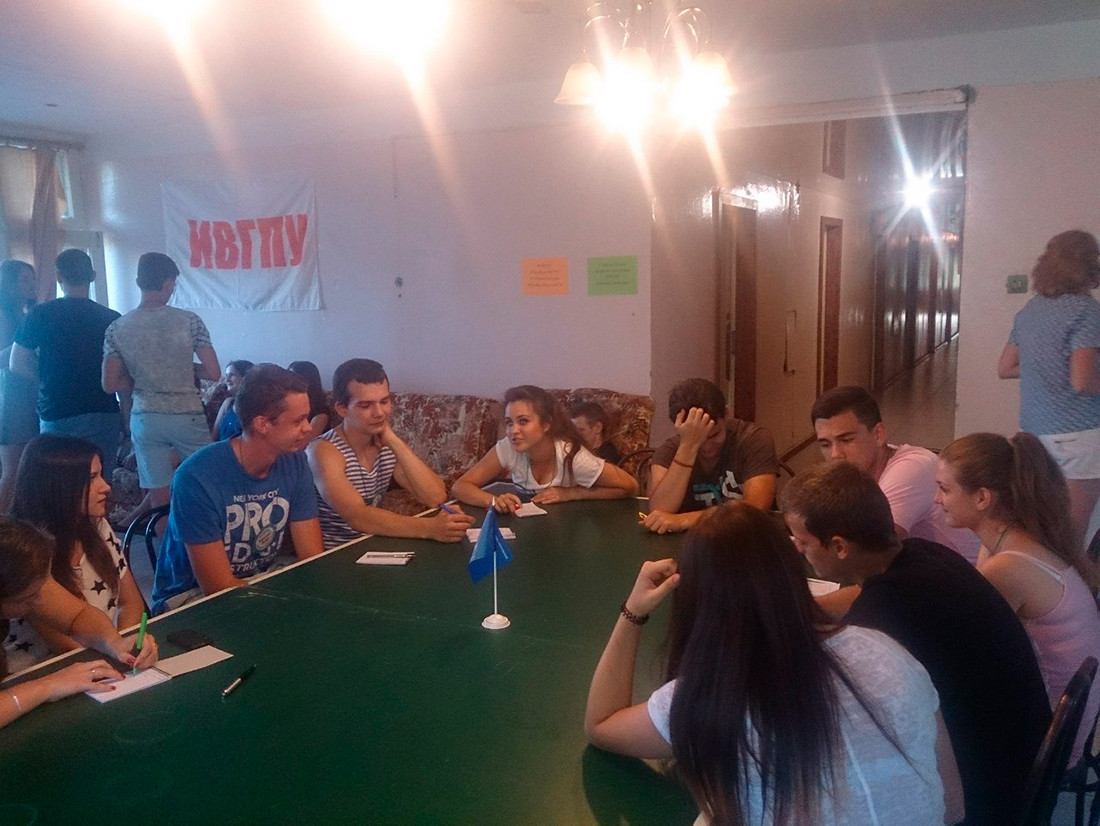

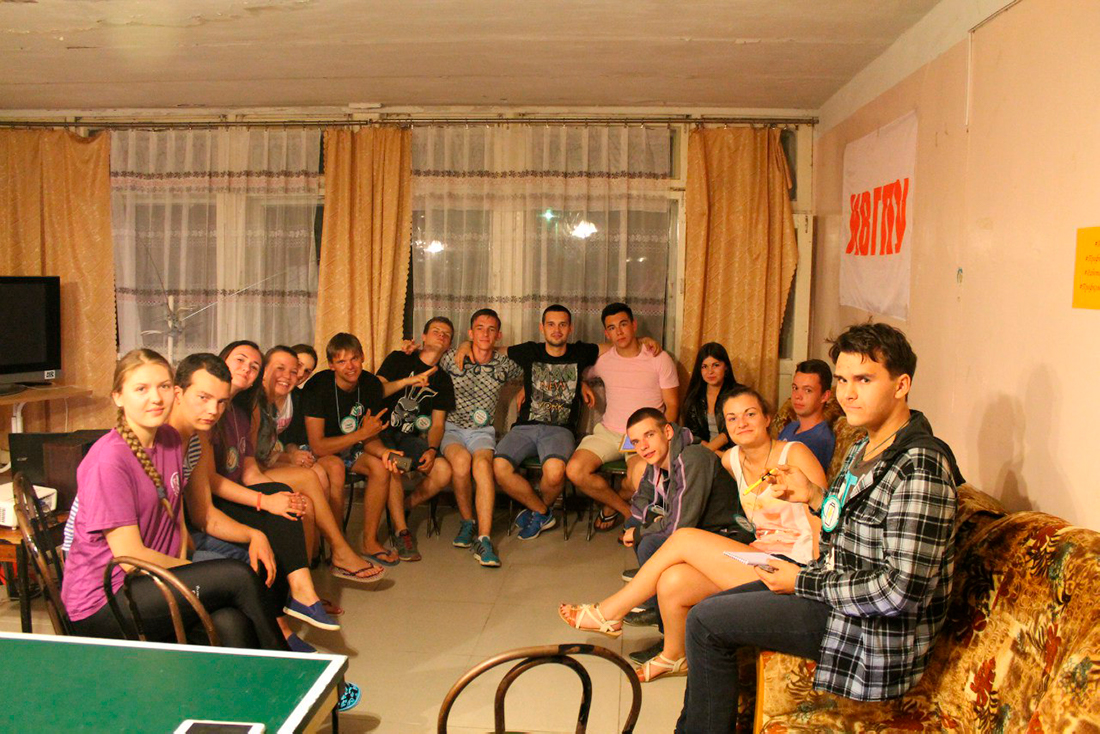

== Library ==
The library provides information support of science and education and promotion of the spiritual, educational and cultural development of the individual. The library serves more than 12 thousand users; about 70 thousand bibliographic units consulted are registered annually. Currently more than 1 million book units are kept in the library.

== International linguistic education center ==
The International Linguistic Education Center is engaged in the training of international students, as well as in linguistic support for the process of teaching Russian as a foreign language.

== Informatization of university activities ==
Resource opportunities of informatization are provided by more than 1000 PCs, united in a single corporate network and provided with access to the Internet, a computer class complex and workstation.

== Art ==
=== Theatre-studio of model art ===
The Theatre-studio of model art trains young men and women aged 15 to 25 years. Training takes place in the following disciplines: defile technique, plastic movements, acting skills, photo position, make-up technique and more. Upon completion of training, a certificate of additional education is issued.

=== The dance team "Universe City" ===
The dance team "Universe City" was set up in 2015 on the basis of ISPU with the support of the Students'Trade Union Organization.
