= Dmitri Podruzhko =

Russian footballer (born 1986)

Personal information
- Full name: Dmitri Olegovich Podruzhko
- Date of birth: 2 June 1986 (age 40)
- Place of birth: Cherepovets, Vologda Oblast, Russian SFSR
- Height: 1.79 m (5 ft 10 1/2 in)
- Position: Midfielder

Senior career*
Years	Team	Apps	(Gls)
2003–2004	FC Chernomorets Novorossiysk	11	(1)
2005–2007	FC Kuban Krasnodar	8	(0)
2006	→ FC Lada Togliatti (loan)	30	(5)
2008–2009	FC Nosta Novotroitsk	42	(1)
2009–2010	FC Luch-Energiya Vladivostok	13	(0)
2010	FC Gazovik Orenburg	12	(0)
2011–2012	FC Ufa	4	(0)
2013	FC Torpedo Armavir	3	(0)
2014–2015	FC Nosta Novotroitsk	26	(3)
- * Club domestic league appearances and goals

Dmitri Olegovich Podruzhko (Russian: Дмитрий Олегович Подружко; born 2 June 1986) is a former Russian professional football player.

== Club career ==
He made his Russian Football National League debut for FC Chernomorets Novorossiysk on 17 September 2004 in a game against FC Dynamo Bryansk. He played six seasons in the FNL for five different clubs.

== Personal life ==
His father Oleg Podruzhko played football professionally.
