= Oleg Krushin =

Russian footballer

Personal information
- Full name: Oleg Viktorovich Krushin
- Date of birth: 3 October 1966
- Place of birth: Ivanovo, Russian SFSR
- Date of death: 24 August 1992 (aged 25)
- Place of death: Volgograd, Russia
- Height: 1.82 m (5 ft 11 1/2 in)
- Positions: Striker; midfielder

Youth career
- FC Tekstilshchik Ivanovo

Senior career*
Years	Team	Apps	(Gls)
1983–1988	FC Tekstilshchik Ivanovo	136	(21)
1989–1990	FC Rotor Volgograd	43	(3)
1991	FC Tekstilshchik Kamyshin	25	(1)
1991–1992	FC Rotor Volgograd	19	(2)
- * Club domestic league appearances and goals

Oleg Viktorovich Krushin (Russian: Олег Викторович Крушин; 3 October 1966 – 24 August 1992) was a Russian professional footballer.

== Club career ==
He made his professional debut in the Soviet First League in 1983 for FC Tekstilshchik Ivanovo.

== Death ==
He died in a car accident when he was driving from Rotor Volgograd training ground back home after a training session.
