= Dmitri Vakhlakov =

Russian footballer

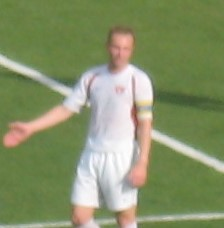

Personal information
- Full name: Dmitri Aleksandrovich Vakhlakov
- Date of birth: 27 July 1980 (age 46)
- Place of birth: Ivanovo, Russian SFSR
- Height: 1.78 m (5 ft 10 in)
- Positions: Defender; midfielder

Senior career*
Years	Team	Apps	(Gls)
1998	FC Tekstilshchik Ivanovo	37	(0)
1999	FC Salyut-YuKOS Belgorod	11	(0)
1999	FC Torpedo Vladimir	8	(0)
2001–2003	FC Spartak-Telekom Shuya	98	(1)
2004–2010	FC Tekstilshchik Ivanovo	153	(1)
- * Club domestic league appearances and goals

Dmitri Aleksandrovich Vakhlakov (Russian: Дмитрий Александрович Вахлаков; born 27 July 1980) is a former Russian professional football player.

== Club career ==
He played in the Russian Football National League for FC Tekstilshchik Ivanovo in 2007.
