= Lydia Konstantinova Komarova =

Russian architect (1902-2002)

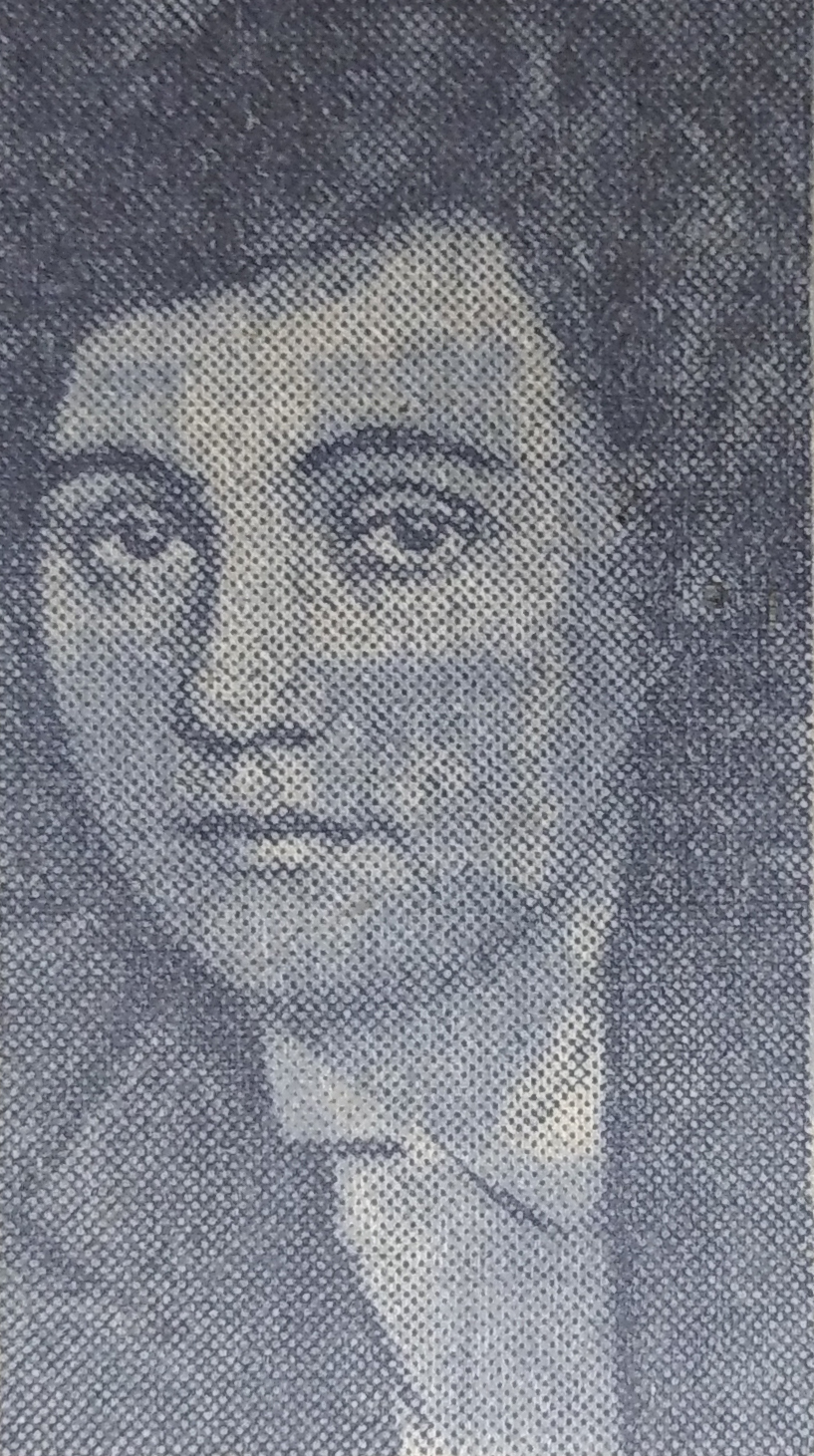
- Born: 6 April 1902; Ivanovo
- Died: 24 June 2002 (aged 100); Moscow
- Education: Vkhutemas
- Occupation: Architect
- Buildings: Bauman Moscow State Technical University; Karaganda Technical University

Lydia Konstantinovna Komarova (6 April 1902 – 24 June 2002) was a Russian architect, pioneer of the avant-garde plastic movement called Constructivism and affiliated with the OSA group (Union of Contemporary Architects).

== Early years ==
During her childhood and adolescence she lived in several cities, she finally arrived in Moscow in 1918. Her presence in Moscow for the celebration of 1 May 1918 outlined her ethical and professional motivations. On the other hand, it marked her interest in the Communist Party and on the other, her commemorative urban decoration made her begin to be interested in the social role of art, understanding it as a fundamental part of the cultural transformation that Russia was experiencing. One of the artists involved in decorating Red Square for this date was architect Aleksandr Vesnin, creative leader of the Constructivists, who would later mentor her.

== Career ==
In 1919 she began studying painting at the State Free Studios (Svomas) with the constructivist artists Nadeshda Udaltsova, Lyubov Popova and Aleksandr Drevin. In 1922 she moved to the architectural faculty of the “laboratory of Russian modernity”: Vkhutemás (State Higher Technical-Artistic Workshops, later institute: Vkhutein) created on the basis of the Svomas. In the faculty of architecture she developed in the two main avant-garde currents, initially she studied with the master Nikolai Ladovski (rationalist), later with Aleksandr Vesnin (constructivist). She remained in the circle of constructivist architecture and joined the OSA group (Union of Contemporary Architects), in which she was part of the editorial team of the magazine Sovremennaya Arkhitektura. On that platform she published articles from her research.

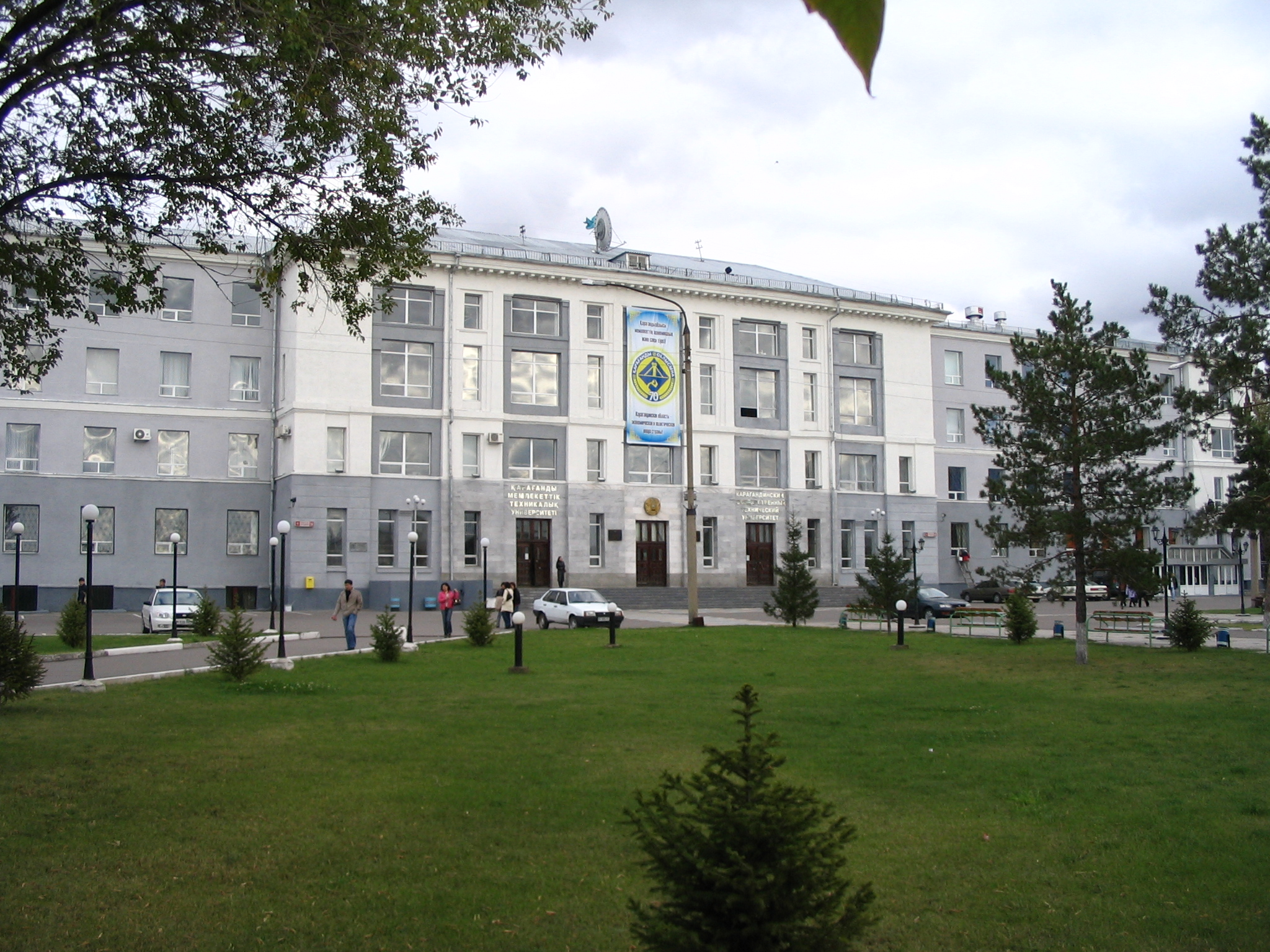
Karaganda Technical University

Komarova was the most prominent architect of the Russian-Soviet avant-garde in Western literature, recognized for her expressive drawings and mainly for her final year project (1929), a building for the headquarters of the Third International in Moscow, which had a Widespread. in local and international architecture magazines. In this proposal she exposes her confidence in technology, her interest in then unconventional structures and her projectual audacity.

One of her last avant-garde designs was the competition project for the Palace of Soviets (1932), which she presented in collaboration with I. Vainshtein and Y. Mushinksy. Unfortunately, her most emblematic designs, as was the case with most Russian architecture of the 1920s, remained on paper; while the buildings she built were designed in the imperial Stalinist style. In any case, Komarova demonstrated her extensive construction and aesthetic knowledge with the breadth and compositional quality of these latest works.

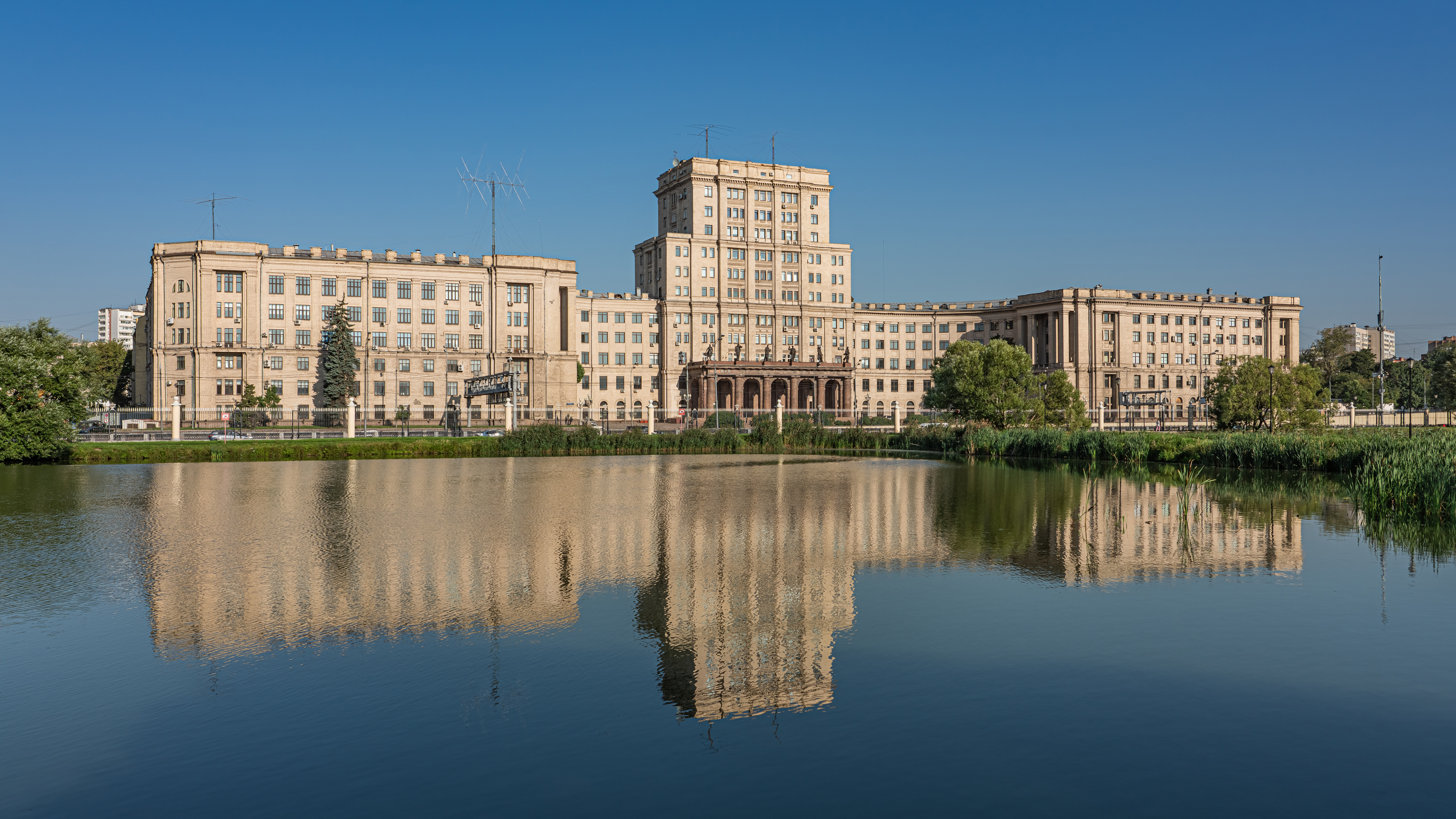
Main building of the Moscow Technical University

In periods of recession, Komarova continued to explore her creativity in different ways, she carried out the renovation of the Gonzaga Theater (1939) and designed some low-rise residential buildings. During the Eastern Front (World War II) she designed tombstones for military cemeteries.

In 1947 she started working at GIPROVUZ (State Institute of Design of Higher Education Institutions) and specialized in educational buildings. She designed and built the Karaganda Polytechnic Institute, the Kemerovo Mining Institute and the main building of the Bauman Moscow State Technical University.

== Awards and honors ==
In 1984, she was recognized as "Honored Architect of the Socialist Federal Republic of the Russian Soviet Union", and in 2002, the Shchusev Museum celebrated his centenary with an exhibition of her works and an opening ceremony, which Komarova attended. Sitting in a wheelchair and now with health complications. In spite of her condition, she addressed the audience, "To the future without stopping!"

== See also ==
Women in architecture
