= Valeri Panchik =

Russian-Ukrainian footballer

Personal information
- Full name: Valeri Stanislavovich Panchik
- Date of birth: 10 July 1963 (age 63)
- Place of birth: Korosten, Ukrainian SSR
- Height: 1.88 m (6 ft 2 in)
- Position: Defender

Youth career
- Tavriya Simferopol

Senior career*
Years	Team	Apps	(Gls)
1981–1983	Dnepr Mogilev	65	(5)
1984	Tavriya Simferopol	39	(1)
1985–1988	Neftchi Baku PFC	101	(1)
1989	Zenit Leningrad	13	(0)
1990–1991	Kristall Kherson	61	(6)
1992	Zenit Izhevsk	3	(0)
1992–1993	Metalist Kharkiv	11	(0)
1993–1994	GKS Tychy	18	(1)
1994–1995	Košice	31	(12)
1995–1996	Baník Ostrava		
1996–1999	Samotlor-XXI Nizhnevartovsk	52	(1)
2000–2001	Berezniki	15	(0)

International career
1986	Soviet Union (Olympic)	1	(0)
- * Club domestic league appearances and goals

Valeri Stanislavovich Panchik (Russian: Валерий Станиславович Панчик; born 10 July 1963) is a former Russian-Ukrainian professional footballer.

== Honours ==
- USSR Federation Cup finalist: 1988.
