= Oleg Podruzhko =

Russian footballer

Personal information
- Full name: Oleg Vladimirovich Podruzhko
- Date of birth: 14 May 1964 (age 62)
- Height: 1.74 m (5 ft 8 1/2 in)
- Positions: Defender; forward; midfielder

Senior career*
Years	Team	Apps	(Gls)
1981–1983	FC Stroitel Cherepovets	78	(8)
1984–1985	FC Dynamo Vologda	39	(1)
1985	FC Dynamo Stavropol	19	(0)
1986–1988	FC Dynamo Vologda	99	(6)
1989–1990	FC Tsement Novorossiysk	83	(32)
1991–1993	FC Zhemchuzhina Sochi	97	(20)
1994	Melaka TMFC		(6)
1995–1996	FC Neftekhimik Nizhnekamsk	53	(4)
1996	FC Bulat Cherepovets	6	(1)
1997	FC Dynamo Vologda	33	(1)
1999	FC Severstal Cherepovets (amateur)		
2000	FC Severstal-3 Cherepovets		
- * Club domestic league appearances and goals

Oleg Vladimirovich Podruzhko (Russian: Олег Владимирович Подружко; born 14 May 1964) is a former Russian football player.

His son Dmitri Podruzhko is a professional footballer.
