= Oleg Mirny =

Russian footballer and coach

Personal information
- Full name: Oleg Pavlovich Mirny
- Date of birth: 8 April 1963 (age 63)
- Height: 1.74 m (5 ft 8 1/2 in)
- Positions: Forward; midfielder

Youth career
- Urozhay Krasnodar

Senior career*
Years	Team	Apps	(Gls)
1981–1983	FC Druzhba Maykop	57	(0)
1983–1985	FC Kuban Krasnodar	61	(4)
1986–1987	FC Geolog Tyumen	55	(5)
1988–1989	FC Kuban Krasnodar	81	(2)
1990	FC Lokomotiv Nizhny Novgorod	31	(3)
1991	FC Zakarpattya Uzhhorod	3	(0)
1991	FC Druzhba Maykop	16	(2)
1991	Navbahor Namangan	20	(2)
1992–1993	FC KAMAZ Naberezhnye Chelny	33	(5)
1994–1996	FC Lada-Yug Krasnodar		
1997–1998	FC Laba Ust-Labinsk		
2002	FC Kuban Ust-Labinsk		

Managerial career
- 2007–2008: FC Krasnodar-2000 (assistant)
- 2009–2016: FC Kuban Krasnodar (U-21 assistant)
- 2016: FC Kuban-2 Krasnodar (assistant)
- 2016–2018: FC Kuban-2 Krasnodar (assistant)
- 2018—2019: FC Urozhay Krasnodar (assistant)
- * Club domestic league appearances and goals

Oleg Pavlovich Mirny (Russian: Олег Павлович Мирный; born April 8, 1963) is a Russian football coach and a former player.
