= Sergey Dikarev =

Russian footballer

Personal information
- Full name: Sergey Petrovich Dikarev
- Date of birth: June 29, 1963 (age 63)
- Place of birth: Ruzayevka
- Height: 1.83 m (6 ft 0 in)
- Position: Defender

Senior career*
| Years | Team | Apps | (Gls) |
| 1984 | FC Svetotekhnika Saransk | 32 | (0) |
| 1985 | FC Krylia Sovetov Kuybyshev | 0 | (0) |
| 1985–1989 | FC SKA Rostov-on-Don | 169 | (6) |
| 1990 | FC Rotor Volgograd | 15 | (0) |
| 1991–1993 | FC Tiligul Tiraspol | | |
| 1993 | FC Svetotekhnika Saransk | 19 | (4) |
| 1993–1994 | FC Tiligul Tiraspol | | |
| 1994–1999 | FC Svetotekhnika Saransk | 186 | (29) |

Managerial career
- 2000–2010: FC Mordovia Saransk (assistant)
- * Club domestic league appearances and goals

Sergey Petrovich Dikaryov (Russian: Серге́й Петро́вич Ди́карев; born June 29, 1963 in Ruzayevka, Mordvin ASSR, Russian SFSR, Soviet Union) is a professional association football coach and a former player from Russia.
