= Ivanovo =

City in Ivanovo Oblast, Russia

Ivanovo Иваново
- City
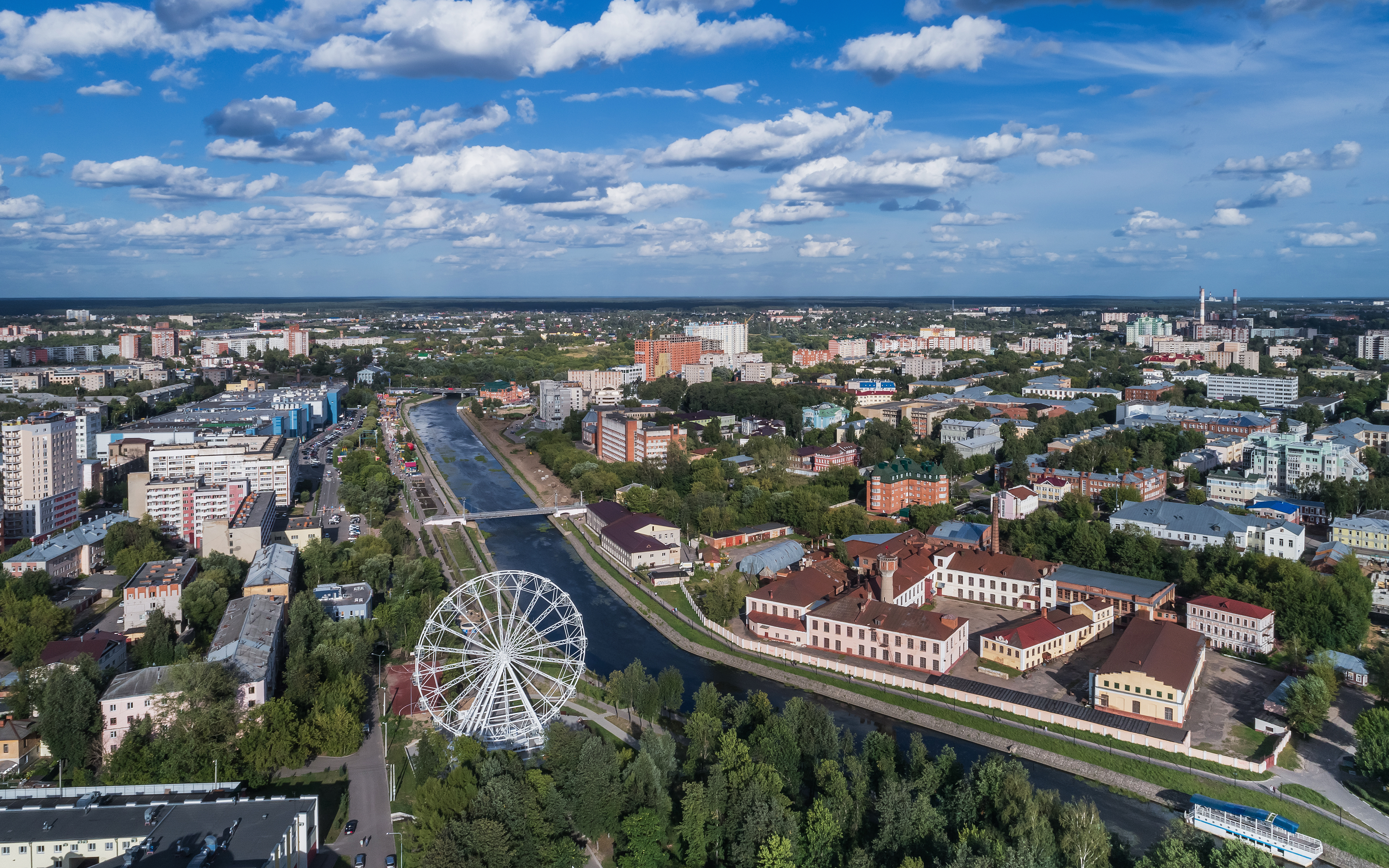
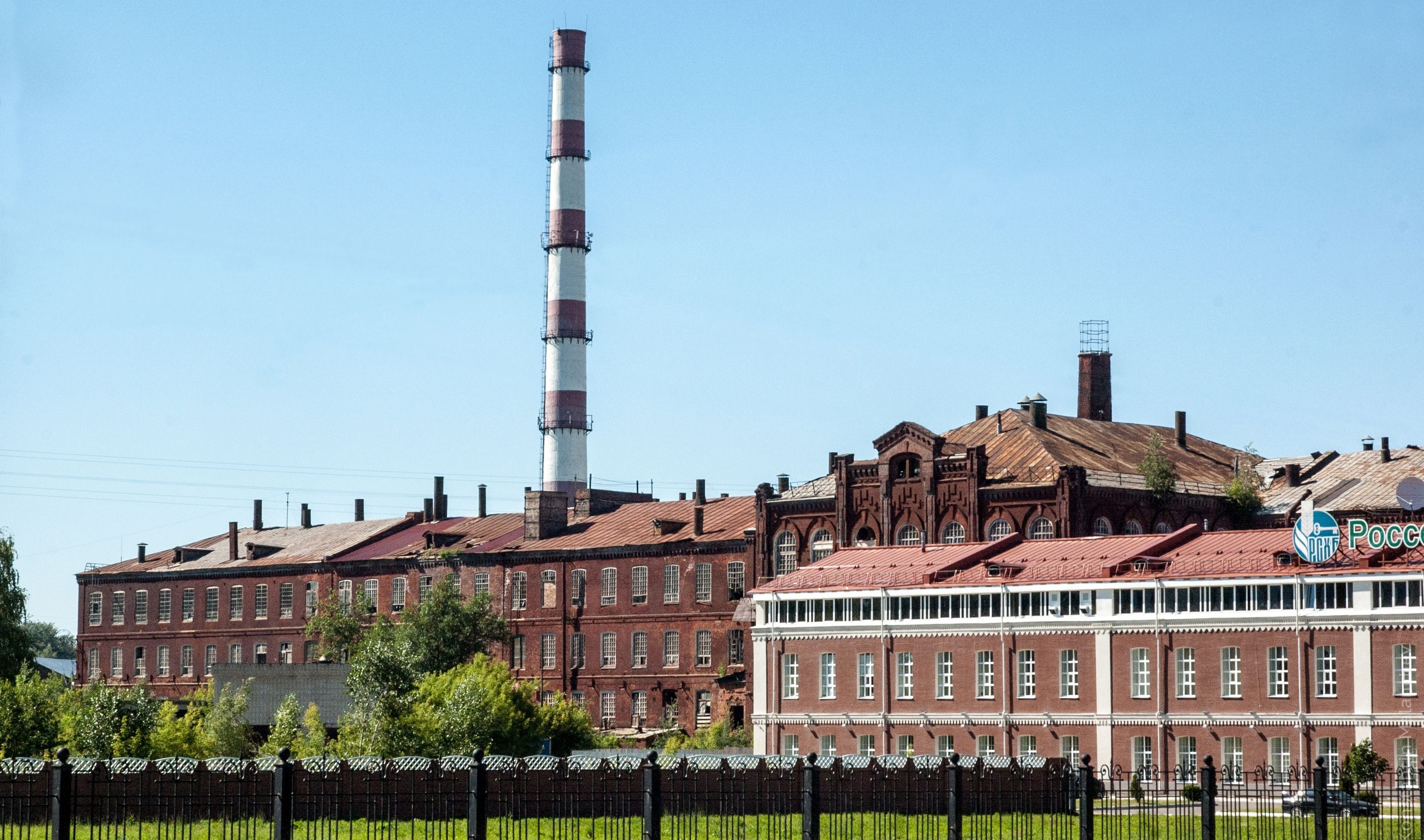
- Aerial view of Ivanovo Ivselbank University of Chemistry and Technology Big Ivanovo Manufactory Vvedensky Monastery Aptechny Lane

- Flag Coat of arms
- Interactive map of Ivanovo
- Location of Ivanovo Ivanovo (European Russia) Ivanovo (Russia) Ivanovo (Europe)
- Coordinates: 56°59′48″N 40°58′55″E
- Country: Russia
- Federal subject: Ivanovo Oblast
- First mentioned: 1608
- City status since: 1871

Government
  - Head: Vladimir Sharypov

Area
  - Total: 104.84 km^{2} (40.48 sq mi)
- Elevation: 120 m (390 ft)

Population (2010 Census)
  - Total: 408,330
  - Estimate (2025): 356,735 (−12.6%)
  - Rank: 43rd in 2010
  - Density: 3,894.8/km^{2} (10,087/sq mi)

Administrative status
  - Subordinated to: City of Ivanovo
  - Capital of: Ivanovo Oblast, Ivanovsky District

Municipal status
  - Urban okrug: Ivanovo Urban Okrug
  - Capital of: Ivanovo Urban Okrug, Ivanovsky Municipal District
- Time zone: UTC+3 (MSK)
- Postal codes: 153002, 153003, 153005 -153009, 153011 -153015, 153020-153027, 153029-153035.
- Dialing code: +7 4932
- OKTMO ID: 24701000001
- Website: ivgoradm.ru

Ivanovo (Russian: Иваново, IPA: [ɪˈvanəvə]) is a city in Russia and the administrative center and largest city of Ivanovo Oblast, located 254 kilometers (158 mi) northeast of Moscow and approximately 100 kilometers (62 mi) from Yaroslavl, Vladimir and Kostroma. Ivanovo has a population of 361,644 as of the 2021 Census, making it the 50th largest city in Russia. Until 1932, it was previously known as Ivanovo-Voznesensk. (Note: Russian: Ива́ново-Вознесе́нск) It is the youngest city of the Golden Ring of Russia.

The city lies on the Uvod River, in the centre of the eponymous oblast. Ivanovo gained city status in 1871, emerged as a major center for textile production, and began to be referred to as the "Russian Manchester". The city is served by Ivanovo Yuzhny Airport.

== Geography ==
The Uvod River, a tributary of the Klyazma, flows from north to south, dividing the city into two halves. There are also two rivers in Ivanovo: the Talka and the Kharinka.

=== Climate ===
Ivanovo has a humid continental climate (Köppen Dfb). The city has warm summers with temperatures reaching over 30 °C and relatively cold winters with frequent snowfall. The lowest air temperature ever recorded is -46°C (January 1940). The warmest month is July with a daily mean of 18.9°C, the coldest month is January with a daily mean of -8.7°C. The highest amount of precipitation is on average in July with 70 mm of precipitation, the driest is March with 34 mm of precipitation.

== History ==
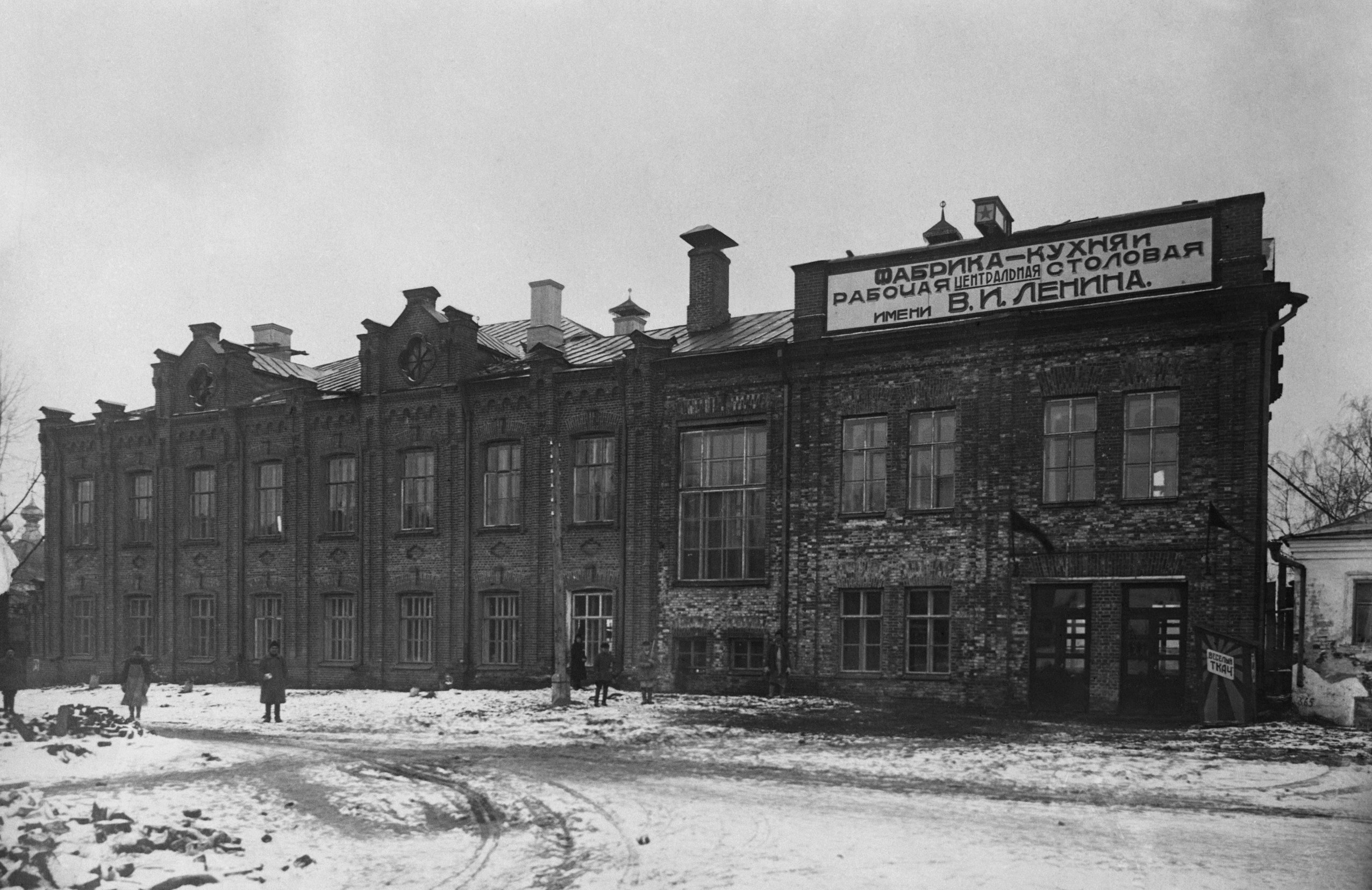
The first factory-kitchen in the USSR was built in Ivanovo

The city is first mentioned in 1561, when it was given to the Cherkassky princely family by Ivan IV, after the latter's marriage to Maria Cherkasskaya. However, the relevant document has since been lost.

The modern city was created by merging the old flax-processing village Ivanovo with the industrial Voznesensky Posad in 1871. Yakov Garelin—a patron of arts, historian, manufacturer, and public figure—is considered to be the founder of the city and its second head. Under his leadership, the city began to develop, industrialise, and grow.

Until 1932, the official name of the city was Ivanovo-Voznesensk. Because of its textile manufacturing industry, Ivanovo earned the sobriquet of the "Russian Manchester" during the 19th century.

By the early 20th century, Ivanovo was competing with Łódź (also a part of the Russian Empire at that time) for the title of the primary textile production center of Europe. As the workers' living conditions were appalling, the strikes were frequent. One of these strikes (May 14-July 22, 1905) led to the first Russian revolution. According to the Soviet historiography, the Ivanovo Soviet (created on May 28, 1905) was one of the first soviets in history.

In 1937, the city opened the Interdom, a school for children of foreign Communists, including high learning.

In Ivanov, the legendary air squadron (then - known as a Regiment) "Normandie-Niemen" began operations. By agreement between the Soviet government and the "Free French" government-in-exile in late 1942, a group of French pilots was sent to the Soviet Union. Construction of a new airport began on the northern outskirts of the city. The pilots were provided with decent housing, and 14 Yak-1 fighter aircraft. During 1943, the French fought alongside the Soviet Air Forces. Ivanov/Ivanovo was bombed in the World War II and fought over, briefly in the Russian Civil War.

After the war, along with the continued textile industry in Ivanovo engineering and other industries developed. In the 1960s, the city became the center of the Upper-Economic Council. The 1980s saw the accelerated pace of housing construction.

On June 9, 1984, Ivanovo was struck by an F4 tornado which killed at least 69 people and injured more than 130 others. Some estimates indicate up to 95 deaths. The tornado damaged, destroyed or leveled more than 1,180 homes and became one of the worst to strike Russia. This was part of the 1984 Soviet Union tornado outbreak which produced at least 11 tornadoes, with two of those being F4. In addition, the severe thunderstorms also produced hail up to 1 kilogram (2.2 lb) in weight, among the heaviest hailstones confirmed worldwide.

In 1991 a memorial was erected in the Balino cemetery, to commemorate the "victims of Stalinist repression".

Since the beginning of the 21st century there has been declining production in Ivanovo. In the first decade of the century, a large number of enterprises were closed. The weaving factories BIM, BAT melange Plant and other smaller companies in the textile industry ceased to exist.

== Administrative and municipal status ==
The Administrative divisions of Ivanovo consists of four districts; Frunzensky District, Oktyabrsky District, Sovietsky District and Leninsky District.

Ivanovo is the administrative center of the oblast and, within the framework of administrative divisions, it also serves as the administrative center of Ivanovsky District, even though it is not a part of it. As an administrative division, it is incorporated separately as the City of Ivanovo—an administrative unit with the status equal to that of the districts. As a municipal division, the City of Ivanovo is incorporated as Ivanovo Urban Okrug.

== Economy ==
Ivanovo gained a reputation as the textile capital of Russia during the nineteenth century. The development of the textile industry involved the importation of textile machinery from England often accompanied by supervisory staff particularly from Lancashire. Most textile workers are women, so it has also been known as the "city of brides". Probably the most famous of the city's female natives was the postmodern French writer Nathalie Sarraute. Also, there is a branch plant of AviraKids, a Russian holding company that occupies 37,5% of the Russian gaming equipment production industry.

== Transportation ==
Public transport is represented by trolleybuses, buses and taxis. The trolleybus system was opened on November 5, 1962. The first line ran from the Bagayeva area (now Victory Square) to the GZIP plant. The Ivanovo Tram was operated from November 6, 1934 until June 1, 2008. According to Ivanov, the former Mayor Alexander Fomin: "Over the past 20 years, the number of vehicles in the city has increased by more than 10 times, while traffic is 5–7 times higher than that for which they were designed.

The system of urban bus services in Ivanovo-Voznesensk began on November 8, 1926. The bus park was originally located on the street Paris Commune. In the early 1960s, a new bus depot was built on Prospekt Tekstilchshiki. In the Soviet period, the operation of buses and coaches exercised Ivanovskoye passenger motor company (MTE) #1, and taxi station (Ivanovo MTE-2). Ivanovo MTE-1 closed in December 2007.

It is home to Ivanovo Severny, which is one of the largest military airlift bases in Russia. Civilian air services are provided at the Ivanovo Yuzhny Airport. Since 1896, there is a railway connection between Ivanovo and Moscow.

== Demographics ==
Historical population
Year	Pop.	±% p.a.
1897	54,200	—
1926	111,182	+2.51%
1939	285,182	+7.51%
1959	335,161	+0.81%
1970	419,639	+2.06%
1979	464,526	+1.14%
1989	478,370	+0.29%
2002	431,721	−0.79%
2010	408,330	−0.69%
2021	361,644	−1.10%
Source: Census data

The population of Ivanovo was 361,644 in 2021, down from 408,330 in 2010 and 478,370 in 1989.

As of the 2021 Census, the ethnic composition of Ivanovo was:

Ethnic group	Population	Percentage
Russians	300,888	95.4%
Tatars	1,705	0.5%
Armenians	1,583	0.5%
Azerbaijanis	1,261	0.4%
Ukrainians	1,022	0.3%
Other	8,831	2.8%

== Education ==
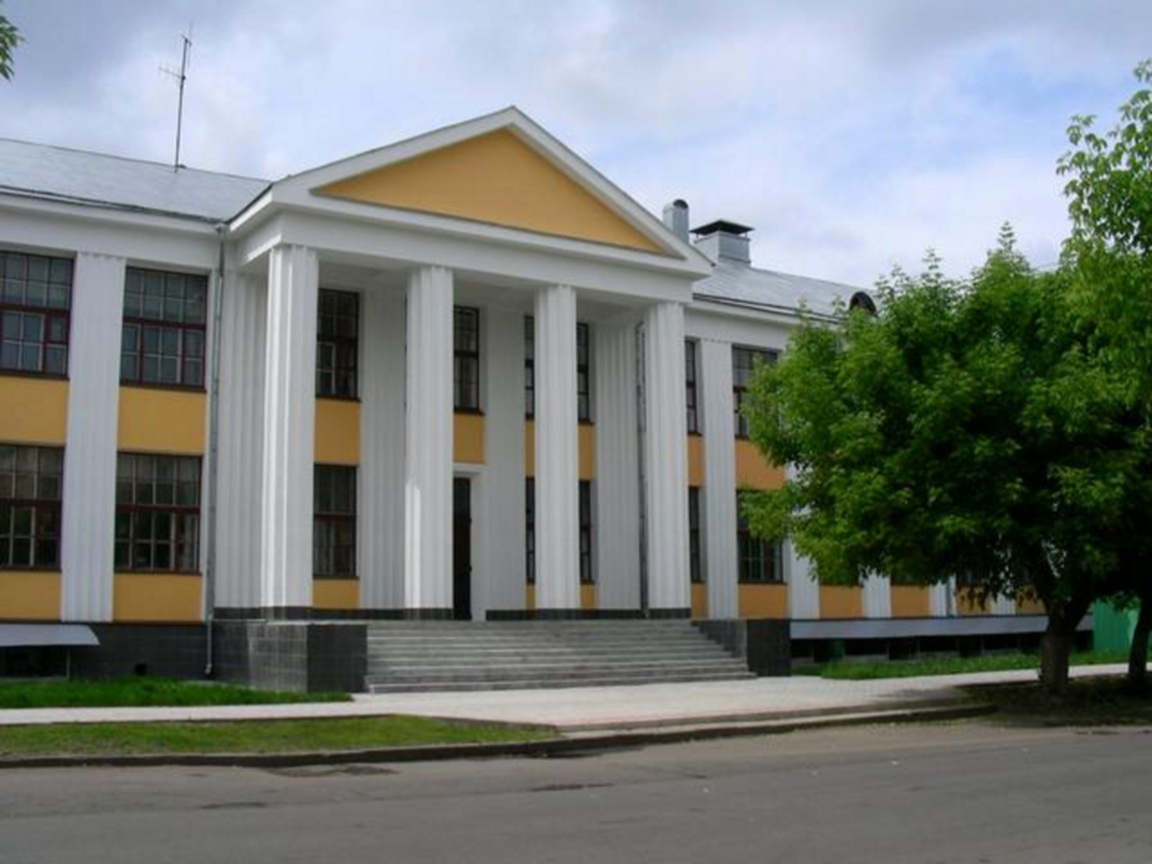
Ivanovo State University of Chemistry and Technology

Ivanovo has several educational institutions: Ivanovo State University, Ivanovo State University of Chemistry and Technology, Ivanovo Medical Academy, Ivanovo Architectural Academy, and Ivanovo State Power University (ISPU).

== Attractions ==
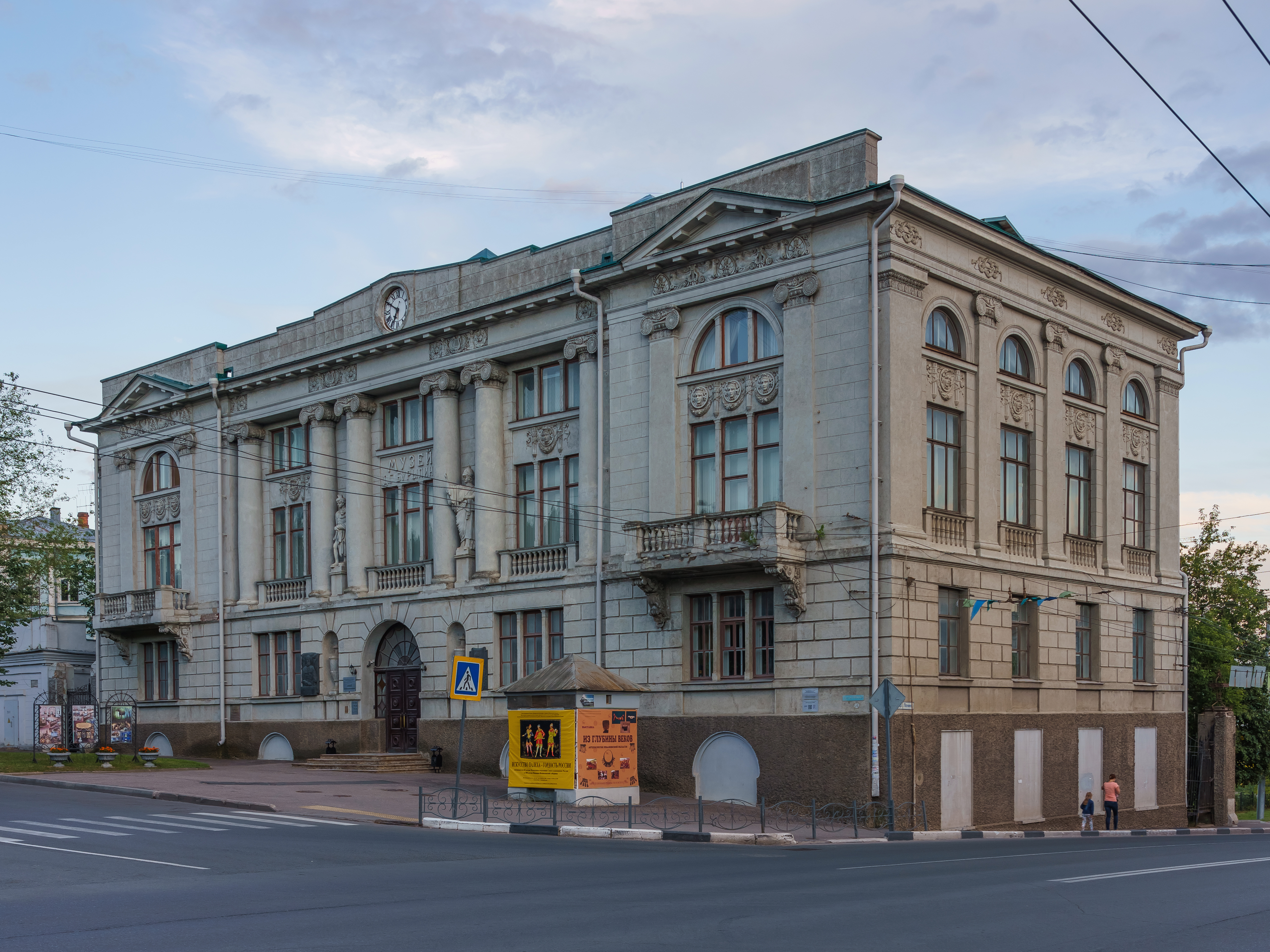
Industrial and art museum

There are several objects of cultural heritage in Ivanovo. The period from 1914 to 1934 became the "golden age" of architecture in Ivanovo. The center of the city boasts buildings of the period of constructionism built there in the 1920s – early 1930s. For historical reasons, Ivanovo-Voznesensk became the site of unique construction experiments carried out by both architects from Moscow and St. Petersburg, and local architects. Among them are the buildings, like the Ship-building (1930), architect D. F. Friedman; the Horseshoe-building (1934), architect A. I. Panov; the Regional Bank building (1927), architect V. A. Vesnin; the Palace of Arts (1939), architect A. V. Vlasov; House of the Collective (1931), architect I. A. Golosov; the Ivanovo railway station (1934); Oblsovnarhoz-houses (1935), N. I. Kadnikov; and others. First Workers' Settlement is rare landmark of the art of city planning from the 20s is of exceptional interest as one of earliest examples of mass, low rise standardized construction that reflects ideas of the city-garden.

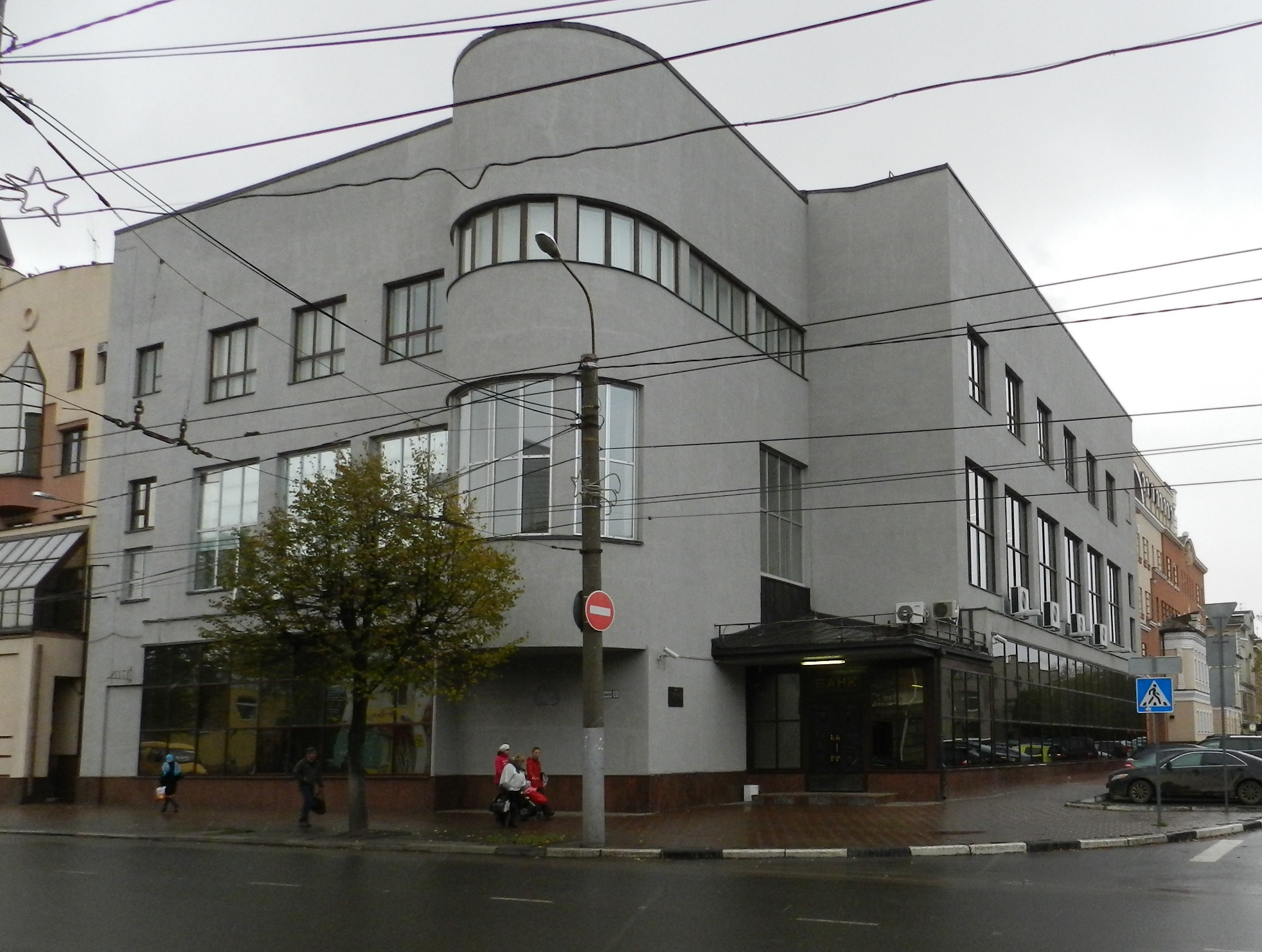
The Regional Bank building

Many monuments are devoted to the revolutionary past of the city, such as the "Red Talka" memorial or numerous monuments to revolutionaries. The historical center of the city is notable mainly for the former houses of famous Ivanovites: the mansion houses of E. I. Gratchev (1774), I. N. Polushin (1904; here the Soviet government was first declared), K. D. Burkov, the Kuvayevs, the Gandurins, the Burylins, etc. The industrial architecture, like the remaining textile manufactures of the 19th century, is also of interest.

Other notable sights include Schudrovskaya Palatka (17th century), the first brick civil building in Ivanovo, the Svyato-Vvedensky Monastery (architect P. Begen), the wooden Uspenskaya church (17th century), the mansion of A. Duringer (1910), and others.

== The youth policy ==
=== History ===
According to historians, the youth policy in the city started in 1892, when the first Marxist society was formed. In 1919, the city Komsomol (Young Communist League) organization was established, and soon this movement spread all over the region. By the beginning of the Great Patriotic War in 1941, Ivanovo regional Komsomol organization already had over 100 thousand people. After the war the main objectives of the movements were to bring up and educate the working youth and to organize various activities. In 1970-1980s different circles and amateur theatres were functioning, and people's universities were established.

In the 1980s, Ivanovo Oblast became one of the largest student centers of European Russia (7 institutes of higher education and 26 colleges with about 35 thousand students).

In the 1990s, the youth policy in Ivanovo was challenged, but remained and developed, due to the initiative of active ivanovites. In 1992, the Department of youth affairs was established. The new youth policy was being formed. New legislature and programs were launched to encourage young families, youth employment, patriotic education and support. 53 clubs of young families and 28 military-patriotic organizations were formed. Since the beginning of the 2000s the complex youth and children's policy has been pursued, through the legislative (like the regional law "Of the state support of youth and children's social organizations") and grant support means.

Nowadays the Department of internal affairs of the Ivanovo region is responsible for the development of the youth policy of the region.

=== Development ===
There are almost 98,000 young people in Ivanovo, i.e. every fourth citizen. It is one of the Russian students' centers, with 8 public and 5 private institutes of higher education, offering educational facilities both for Russian and foreign students. The city is the third largest one in the country after Moscow and the Moscow region, in terms of number of students per 10 000 citizens.

There are 18 military-patriotic clubs with about 550 young participants, 170 people are in charge of local history activities. More than 20 per cent of young citizens take part in the youth organizations' activities, like "IMCA – Ivanovo", Russian Youth Union, the "Novy Rubezh", Ivanovo city pupils' Duma, the "Shkolny Activ Goroda" (City school activists) and many others.

Annually the city holds the "Students' spring" festival of students' creativity. It's the most popular event in cultural life of Ivanovo students, with the participation of all universities and institutes. Since 1997, the interregional festival of students "Maslenitsa" ("Pancake week") is held. Yearly about 20 students' teams from 6-8 regions take part in it.

Being concerned of the youth creativeness, the city government supports the development of facilities of students' cultural, sporting and entertainment centers, as well as organizes regional sports competitions among students.

In order to encourage young scientists, each year the best students are given the grant of the governor, which is a good support for gifted researches. To increase the academic level of the youth, the contest of students' and postgraduates' researches was established. The papers should be devoted to the resolution of topical problems of the region. The best authors are given the award named after M. V. Frunze.

Ivanovo is a multinational city, more than 100 nationalities' representatives live here. There are 16 ethnic and cultural autonomies, associations and centers.

Much attention is paid to the youth parliamentarism, which is developing within such structures, as the Youth Civic Council of the City Administration and Ivanovo city pupils' Duma. The deputies of the latter participate in real elections campaigns in their schools, represents the schoolchildren's interests to the municipal government, contribute to the development of youth initiatives, arrange socially topical activities, like the charity marathon "Ty nam nuzhen" ("We need you") aimed at supporting children with disabilities. There are several opportunities for the talented youth as well, e.g. awards and grants from the Head of the city.

In 2012 schoolchildren of Ivanovo supported the city's bid to the contest "The European Youth Capital 2015" and organized a flash mob and made a large patchwork cloth. As a candidate city, Ivanovo is developing a comprehensive program for the youth development, having invited professionals of the international level. One of the contest's objective being to strengthen interaction between local communities and the European structures, Ivanovo is increasing cooperation with international partners and investors, in order to develop its infrastructure. So far the municipal and regional administration with the young activists has decided to bid for the title of the European Youth capital 2015. The initiative has been welcomed by Prime-minister and President of Russia.

On July 4, 2012, the European Youth Forum has published a list of finalists for the title "European Capital of Youth 2015." The city of Ivanovo was one of the finalists of the city.

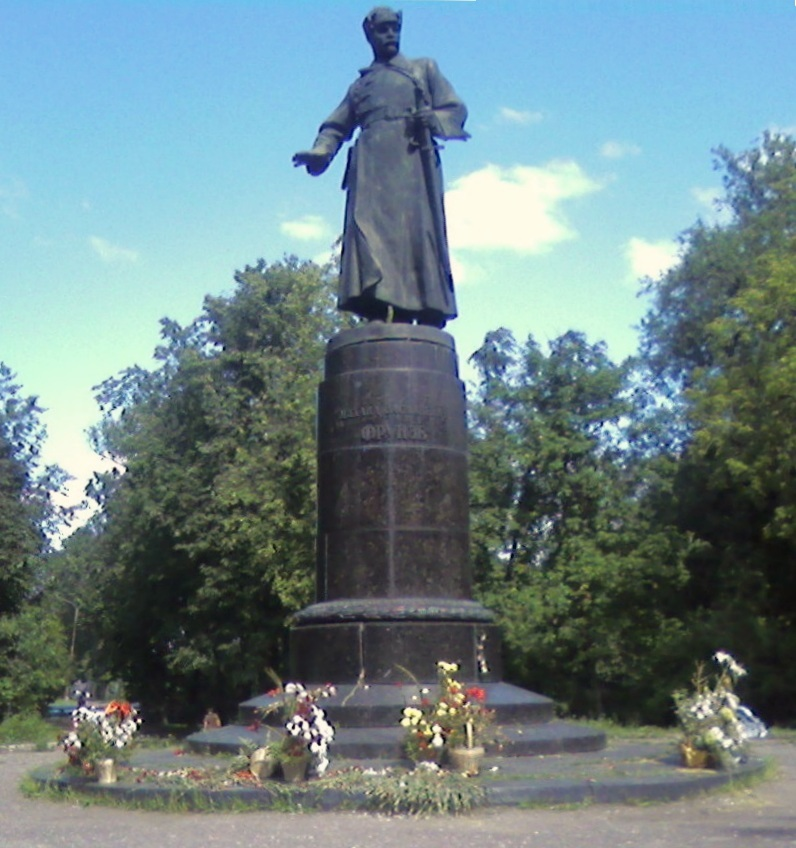
Mikhail Frunze Monument

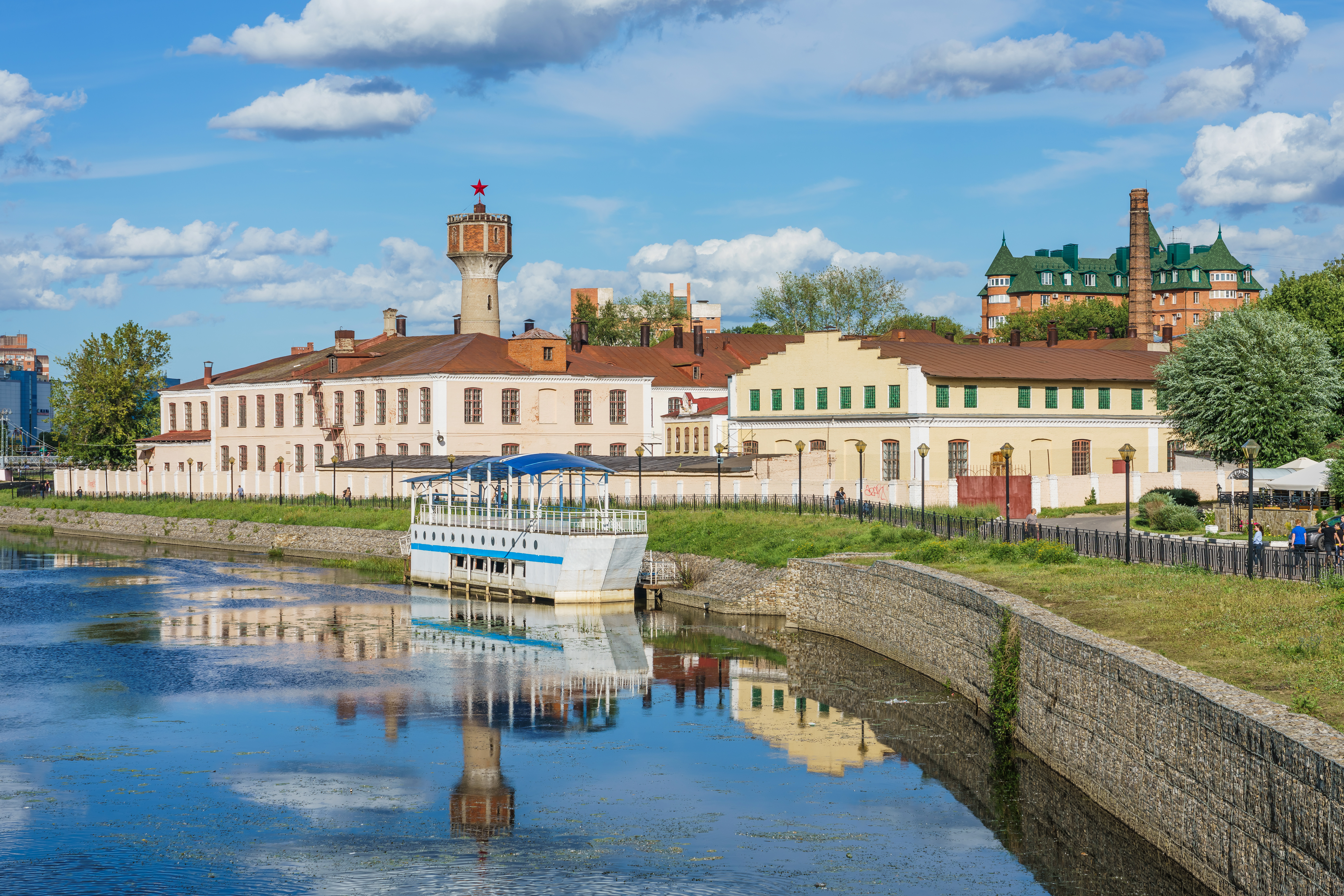
Ivanovo Industrial Paper Goods Factory (formerly Fokin Manufactory)

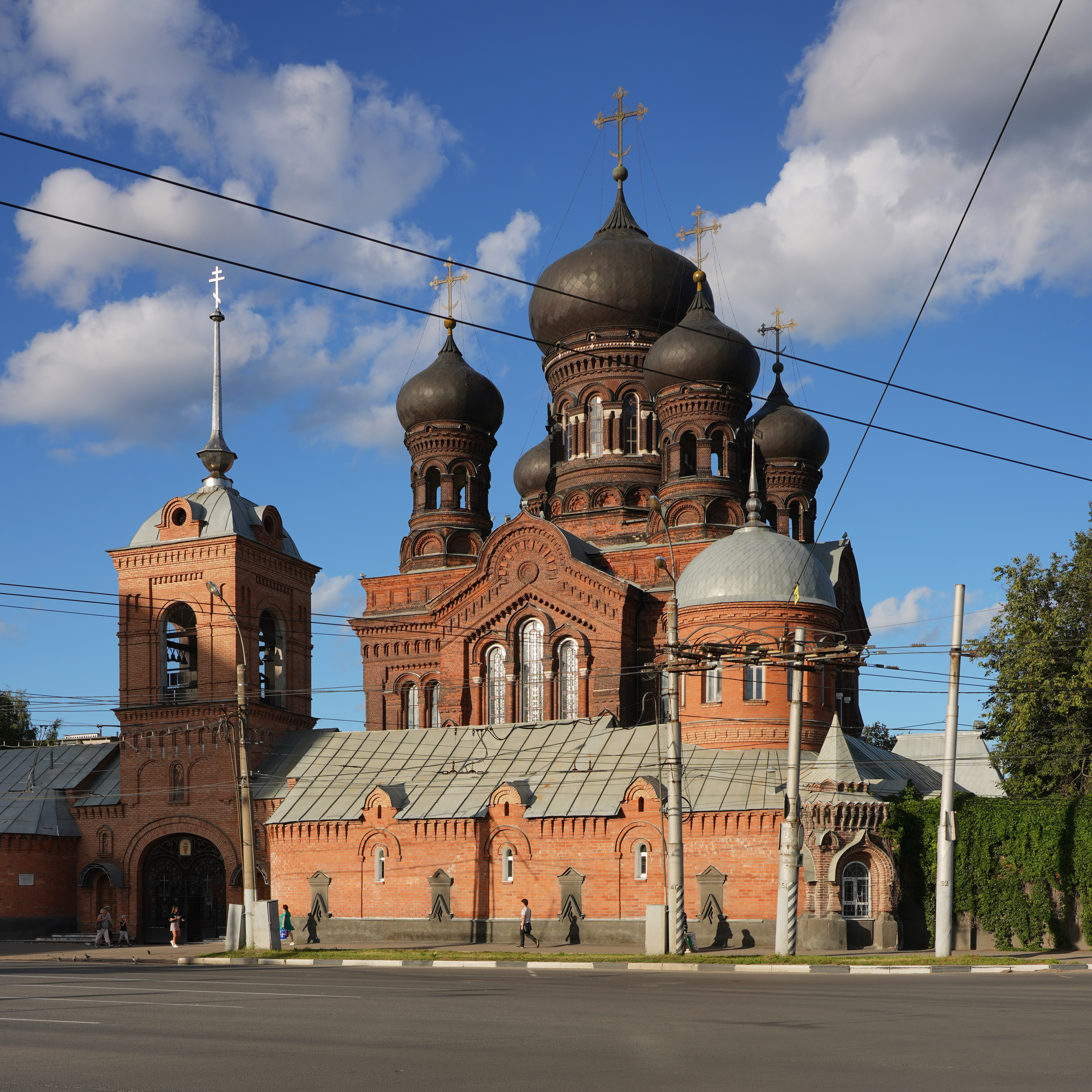
Vvedensky Monastery

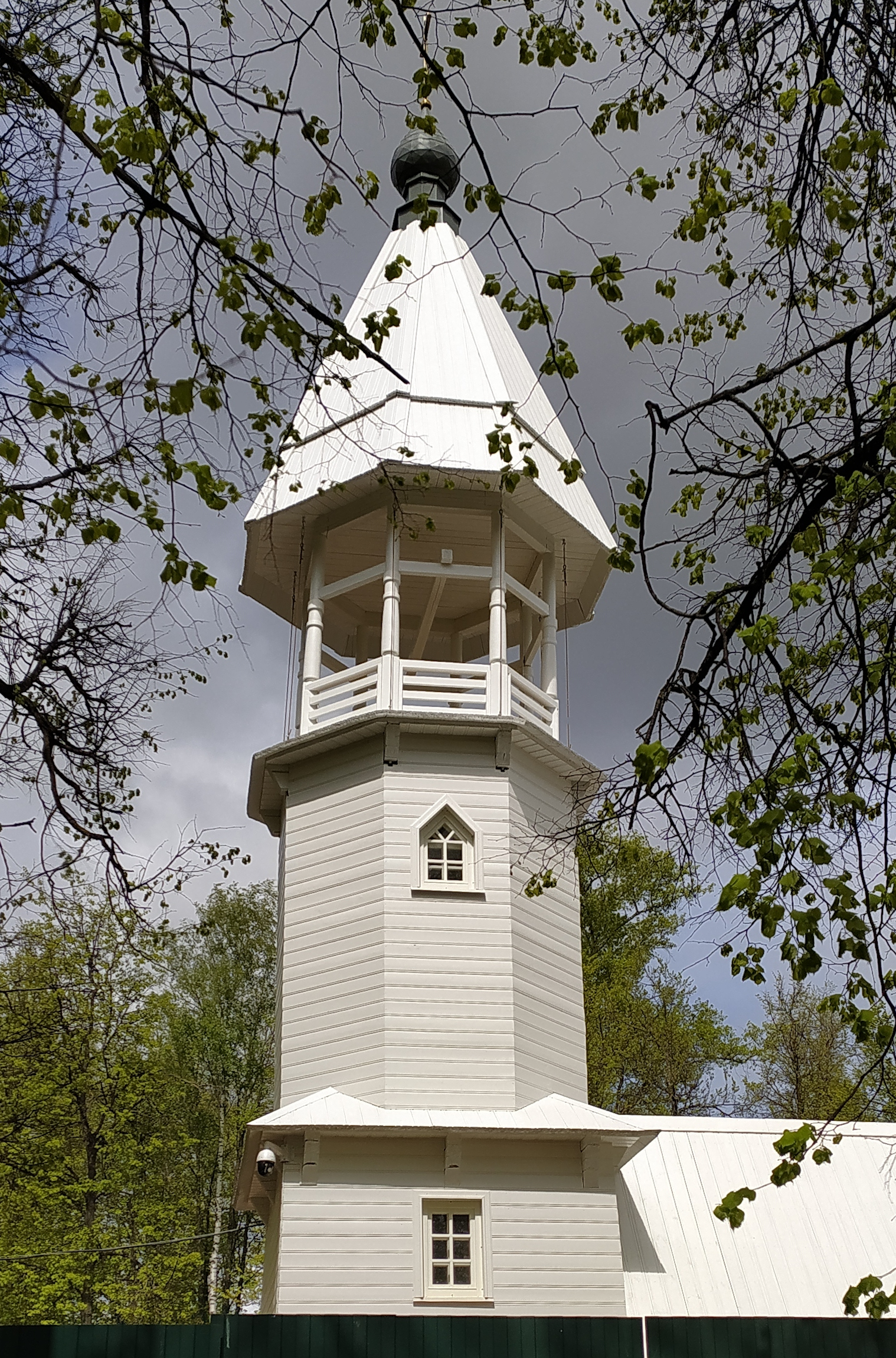
The Church of the Assumption

== Notable people ==
- Mikhail Aleksandrov, footballer
- Diskoteka Avariya, pop band
- Anna Barkova, poet
- Alla Bruletova, Model, vlogger
- Andrei Bubnov, Bolshevik politician
- Yelena Kruglova, swimmer
- Oleg Krushin, former professional footballer
- Sergey Nechayev, revolutionary nihilist
- Marina A. Pavlova, neuroscientist and psychologist
- Sergei Pesyakov, footballer
- Nathalie Sarraute, writer
- Georgiy Shilov, mathematician
- Kristina Smirnova, chemist
- Vladimir Tsybin, flautist and conductor
- Dmitri Vakhlakov, former professional footballer
- Slava Zaitsev, designer
- Lydia Konstantinova Komarova, architect
- Aleksei Tyurgashkin, footballer

== Twin towns – sister cities ==
Ivanovo is twinned with:

- Ayia Napa, Cyprus
- Kraljevo, Serbia
- Mladenovac (Belgrade), Serbia
- Orsha, Belarus
- Szigethalom, Hungary

== See also ==
- Interdom
