= Yaroslav Dmytruk =

Soviet-Ukrainian footballer

Personal information
- Date of birth: 6 September 1964 (age 62)
- Place of birth: Soviet Union

Youth career
- Rivne sports school

Senior career*
Years	Team	Apps	(Gls)
1982–1984	FC Avanhard Rivne	22	(2)
1992	FC Khutrovyk Tysmenytsia	?	
1992	FC Lokomotyv Rivne	?	

International career
1983	Ukrainian SSR	?	
- * Club domestic league appearances and goals

Yaroslav Dmytruk (6 September 1964) is an association footballer from the former Soviet Union. After retiring from playing football, Dmytruk became a football referee in lower leagues of Ukraine.

In 1983 Dmytruk took part in the Summer Spartakiad of the Peoples of the USSR in the team of Ukrainian SSR.
