= Vadim Sosulin =

Russian footballer

Personal information
- Full name: Vadim Viktorovich Sosulin
- Date of birth: 18 March 1963 (age 63)
- Place of birth: Barnaul, Russian SFSR
- Height: 1.76 m (5 ft 9 1/2 in)
- Positions: Defender; midfielder

Youth career
- FC Dynamo Barnaul

Senior career*
| Years | Team | Apps | (Gls) |
| 1980–1985 | FC Dynamo Barnaul | 142 | (30) |
| 1986–1992 | FC Fakel Voronezh | 236 | (24) |
| 1992–1994 | SpVg Frechen 20 | | |
| 1995–1996 | FC Fakel Voronezh | 22 | (3) |
| 1996 | FC Lokomotiv Liski | 22 | (1) |
- * Club domestic league appearances and goals

Vadim Viktorovich Sosulin (Russian: Вадим Викторович Сосулин; born 18 March 1963 in Barnaul) is a former Russian football player.
