= Mikhail Aleksandrov =

Russian footballer and coach

Personal information
- Full name: Mikhail Alekseyevich Aleksandrov
- Date of birth: 26 August 1963 (age 63)
- Place of birth: Ivanovo, Russian SFSR
- Height: 1.76 m (5 ft 9 1/2 in)
- Positions: Midfielder; striker

Senior career*
Years	Team	Apps	(Gls)
1979–1980	Volzhanin Kineshma	15	(0)
1981–1986	Tekstilshchik Ivanovo	148	(37)
1987	Fakel Voronezh	5	(0)
1987–1989	Tekstilshchik Ivanovo	88	(7)
1990–1991	Torpedo Taganrog	60	(8)
1991–1993	Boruta Zgierz	38	(1)
1994	Tikkurilan Palloseura		
1995–1996	Istochnik Rostov-on-Don	42	(2)
1996	Torpedo Kineshma		
1997–1999	Spartak-Telekom Shuya	54	(3)

Managerial career
- 2003: Tekstilshchik Ivanovo
- 2005–2006: Tekstilshchik Ivanovo (assistant)
- 2009: Tekstilshchik Ivanovo
- 2010: Baltika Kaliningrad (coach-analyst)
- * Club domestic league appearances and goals

Mikhail Alekseyevich Aleksandrov (Russian: Михаил Алексеевич Александров; born 26 August 1963) is a Russian professional football coach and a former player.

== Playing career ==
As a player, he made his debut in the Soviet Second League in 1981 for FC Tekstilshchik Ivanovo.
