= Gloria Jeans =

Russian clothing retail company

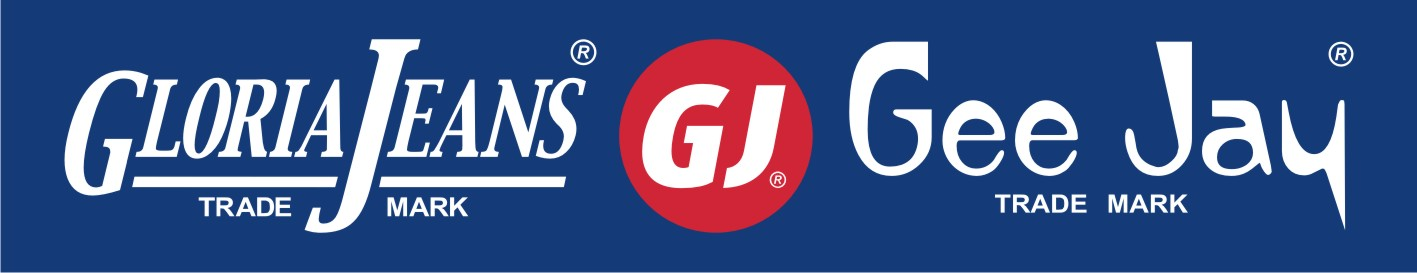

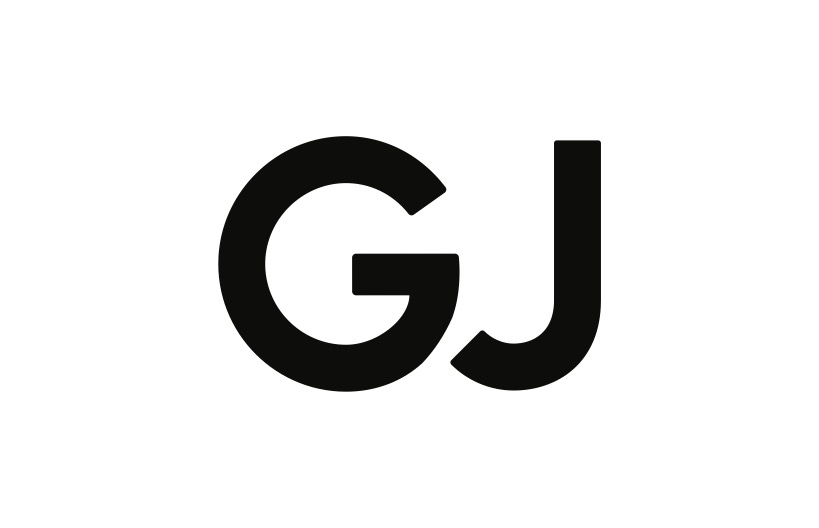
- Industry: Retail
- Founded: 1988
- Founder: Vladimir Melnikov
- Headquarters: Moscow, Russia
- Key people: Maksim Basov (CEO)
- Brands: Gloria Jenas, Gee Jay, Ready! Steady! Go!
- Revenue: 40,493,000,000 Russian ruble (2017)
- Operating income: ▲78 billion rubles (2023)
- Net income: ▲9,6 billion rubles (2023)
- Owner: Vladimir Melnikov

Gloria Jeans is a Soviet and Russian company, established in 1988 by Vladimir Melnikov. It manufactures and sells clothing, shoes, and accessories for the whole family under the brands Gloria Jeans and Gee Jay.

== History ==
In 1988, Vladimir Melnikov founded the Gloria cooperative in Rostov-on-Don, which became the country's first official jeans manufacturer.

In 1995, the company was transformed into Gloria Jeans. In 1997, Melnikov founded Gloria Jeans Corporation JSC, a retail trade company.

Gloria Jeans is engaged in the retail and sale of clothing for all categories of people under the Gloria Jeans and Gee Jay brands.

In 2009, according to the research company TNS Russia, Gloria Jeans was ranked second among the most purchased Russian brands.

In 2012, Gloria Jeans had 48 factories in Russia and Ukraine, and 550 stores in the Russian Federation.

In 2015, the company had nine regional offices and merchandising and design centers in Sao Paulo (Brazil), Istanbul (Turkey), Chicago (USA), Japan, Vietnam, and Shanghai.

The company's central office was located in Rostov-on-Don until 2016. In 2016, Melnikov moved his office to Moscow.

In 2022, Gloria Jeans rebranded.

In the same year, each Gloria Jeans worker who had worked at the company for at least 10 years received 1 million rubles from Melnikov.

At the end of 2022, Gloria Jeans had 675 stores in 300 cities.

As of the end of 2023, Gloria Jeans had 710 stores located in more than 300 cities in Russia, Belarus and Kazakhstan. The company also had two logistics complexes in Novosibirsk and Rostov Oblast.

In 2024, Gloria Jeans launched a new clothing brand, Ready! Steady! Go!, designed for teenagers.

In 2024, Gloria Jeans established GJ Tech LLC as a subsidiary to optimize the use of information technology across its operations.

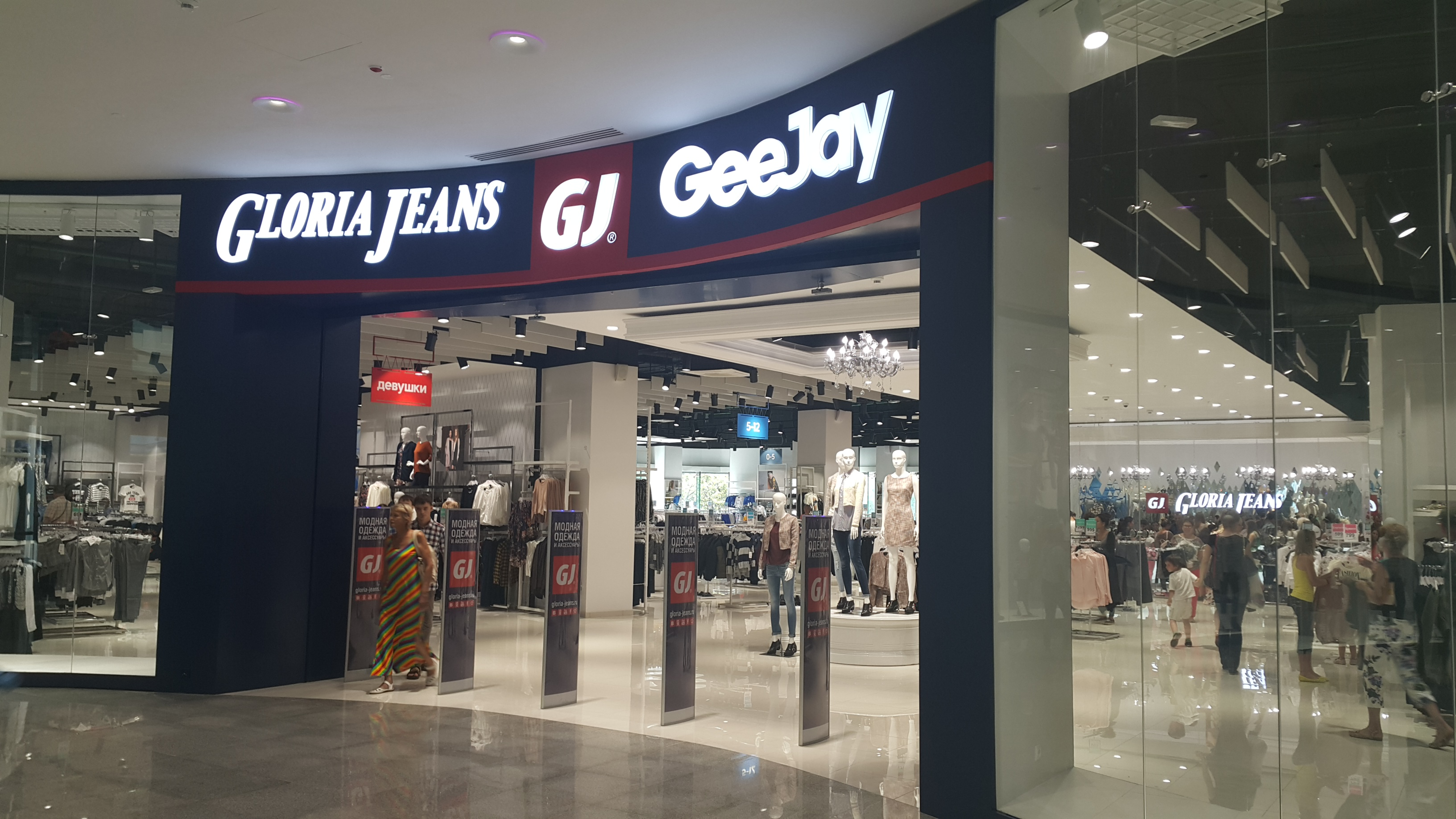
Shop in Moscow (shopping mall Oceania, 2016)

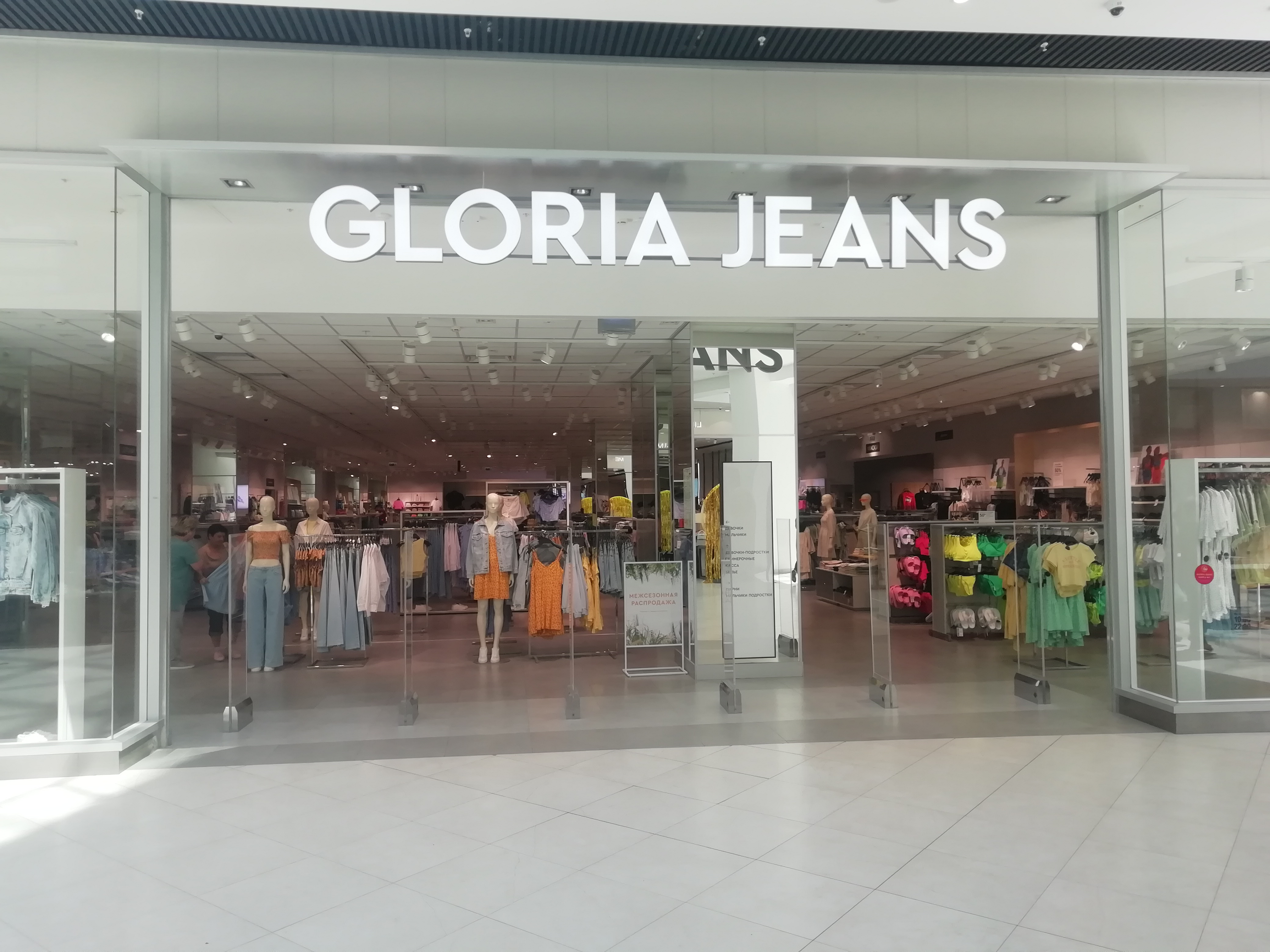
A store in Rostov-on-Don (shopping center MegaMag, 2023)

== Logo ==
Gloria Jeans has used three logos throughout its existence.

Until 2011, the Gloria Jeans brand name was italicized on the logo and was blue. The letters "G" and "J" were larger than the other letters. There was a horizontal stripe under the name.

In 2011, the logo changed colors and now had the white inscription "Gloria Jeans" on a blue background.

In 2013, the company used the logo with white letters "G" and "J" on a red background, below which was the blue inscription "Gloria Jeans".

The new 2022 logo is minimalistic, in a contemporary font: the white letters "GJ" on a gray background.

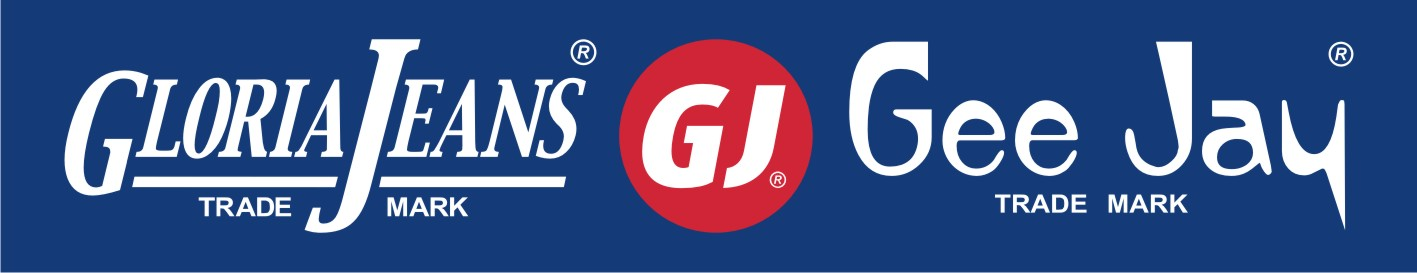
Logo from 2011 to 2013

Logo from 2013 to 2022

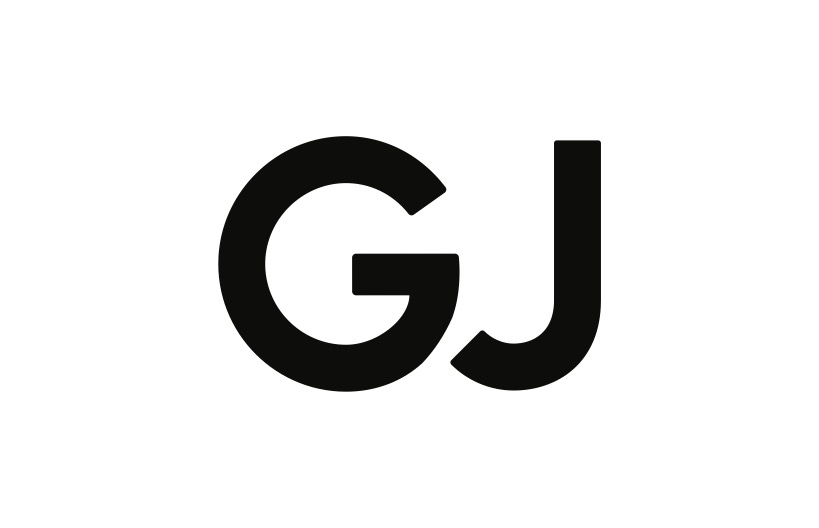
Logo from 2022

== Owners and management ==
The founder of the company and chairman of the board of directors is Vladimir Melnikov.

=== General directors ===
From 2022 to June 2024, the general director was Liliya Bulatova. The British Seis Ismail previously held the post.

Since June 2024, the general director has been Maksim Basov, who is also a member of the board of directors.

== Financial indicators ==
Year	Revenue, billion rubles	Net income, billion rubles
2011	15,5	-
2012	▲23,3	2,7
2013	▲27,65	▼2,65
2014	▲28	-
2015	-	▲2,7-2,8
2016	▲34	▲4,2
2017	▲40,8	-
2018	▲47	-
2019	▼37,7	▼0,927
2020	▲40,2	▲2
2021	▼19,8	▼1,1
2022	▲70	-
2023	▲78	▲9,6
