= Viktor Zemlin =

Russian footballer (born 1964)

Personal information
- Full name: Viktor Yuryevich Zemlin
- Date of birth: 24 January 1964 (age 62)
- Place of birth: Trubino, Shchyolkovsky District, Russian SFSR
- Height: 1.76 m (5 ft 9 1/2 in)
- Position: Forward

Youth career
- FC Lokomotiv Moscow

Senior career*
Years	Team	Apps	(Gls)
1980–1981	FC Lokomotiv Moscow	0	(0)
1982	FC Dynamo Moscow	0	(0)
1982–1984	PFC CSKA Moscow	6	(0)
1984–1985	FC Lokomotiv Moscow	39	(5)
1986–1990	FC Kuzbass Kemerovo	155	(33)
1990–1992	FC Shinnik Yaroslavl	65	(16)
- * Club domestic league appearances and goals

Viktor Yuryevich Zemlin (Russian: Виктор Юрьевич Землин; born 24 January 1964) is a former Russian football player.
