= Andrey Lebedev (footballer) =

Russian footballer

Personal information
- Full name: Andrey Vladimirovich Lebedev
- Date of birth: 2 January 1963 (age 63)
- Height: 1.78 m (5 ft 10 in)
- Positions: Midfielder; defender

Senior career*
Years	Team	Apps	(Gls)
1981–1982	FShM Moscow	46	(1)
1983–1984	Lokomotiv Moscow	40	(2)
1985	Krasnaya Presnya Moscow		
1988	Krasnaya Presnya Moscow	19	(0)
1988–1989	Spartak Ordzhonikidze	34	(1)
1989	Shinnik Yaroslavl	10	(0)
1990	Vulkan Petropavlovsk-Kamchatsky	26	(5)
1991–1993	Lokomotiv Nizhny Novgorod	52	(6)
1993–1994	IK Brage	6	(0)
1994–1995	Lokomotiv Nizhny Novgorod	23	(1)
1996	Rubin Kazan	27	(7)
1997	Torpedo Arzamas	4	(0)
1997	MEPhI Moscow	18	(1)
- * Club domestic league appearances and goals

Andrey Vladimirovich Lebedev (Russian: Андрей Владимирович Лебедев; born 2 January 1963) is a Russian retired professional footballer.
