= 1978 UEFA European Under-18 Championship squads =

Player listings in youth football competition

Players in bold have later been capped at full international level.

== Group A ==
=== West Germany ===
Head coach:Herbert Widmayer

| No. | Pos. | Player | Date of birth (age) | Caps | Goals | Club |
|---|---|---|---|---|---|---|
| | GK | Uwe Greiner | 8 August 1959 (aged 18) | | | (German Football Association) VfB Stuttgart |
| | DF | Manfred Bergfeld | 13 March 1961 (aged 17) | | | (German Football Association) Borussia Mönchengladbach |
| | DF | Bernd Gorski | 4 October 1959 (aged 18) | | | (German Football Association) FC St. Pauli |
| | DF | Thomas Kruse | 7 September 1959 (aged 18) | | | (German Football Association) FC Schalke 04 |
| | DF | **Bernd Schuster** | 22 December 1959 (aged 18) | | | (German Football Association) FC Augsburg |
| | DF | Thomas Sievert | 11 April 1961 (aged 17) | | | (German Football Association) FC Schalke 04 |
| | MF | **Thomas Allofs** | 17 November 1959 (aged 18) | | | (German Football Association) Fortuna Düsseldorf |
| | MF | Michael Geiger | 27 September 1960 (aged 17) | | | (German Football Association) Union Böckingen |
| | MF | Helmut Gorka | 13 April 1960 (aged 18) | | | (German Football Association) FC Schalke 04 |
| | MF | **Thomas Kroth** | 26 August 1959 (aged 18) | | | (German Football Association) Kickers Offenbach |
| | FW | Dieter Allig | 6 August 1959 (aged 18) | | | (German Football Association) Viktoria Aschaffenburg |
| | FW | Ralf Augustin | 27 September 1960 (aged 17) | | | (German Football Association) Borussia Dortmund |
| | FW | Karl-Heinz Bührer | 20 October 1959 (aged 18) | | | (German Football Association) Freiburger FC |
| | FW | Thomas Remark | 5 October 1959 (aged 18) | | | (German Football Association) Röchling Völklingen |

=== Italy ===
Head coach:

=== Portugal ===
Head coach: Peres Bandeira

| No. | Pos. | Player | Date of birth (age) | Caps | Goals | Club |
|---|---|---|---|---|---|---|
| | GK | **Zé Beto** | 21 February 1960 (aged 18) | | | (Portuguese Football Federation) FC Porto |
| | GK | Fernando Justino | 14 October 1960 (aged 17) | | | (Portuguese Football Federation) Sporting |
| | DF | **Teixeiriinha** | 2 August 1960 (aged 17) | | | (Portuguese Football Federation) Benfica |
| | DF | **Carlos Parente** | 8 April 1961 (aged 17) | | | (Portuguese Football Federation) Benfica |
| | DF | Joaquim Simões | 1 November 1959 (aged 18) | | | (Portuguese Football Federation) Benfica |
| | DF | Alberto Bastos Lopes | 22 October 1959 (aged 18) | | | (Portuguese Football Federation) Benfica |
| | DF | Santana | 21 March 1960 (aged 18) | | | (Portuguese Football Federation) Benfica |
| | MF | **Diamantino Miranda** | 3 August 1959 (aged 18) | | | (Portuguese Football Federation) Benfica |
| | MF | Quinito | 8 September 1961 (aged 16) | | | (Portuguese Football Federation) FC Porto |
| | MF | Tomás Fernandes | 14 January 1960 (aged 18) | | | (Portuguese Football Federation) Sporting |
| | MF | Nogueira | 13 January 1960 (aged 18) | | | (Portuguese Football Federation) FC Porto |
| | MF | Almeidinha | 21 January 1960 (aged 18) | | | (Portuguese Football Federation) Boavista |
| | MF | Artur | 8 August 1959 (aged 18) | | | (Portuguese Football Federation) Sporting |
| | FW | João Grilo | 1 August 1959 (aged 18) | | | (Portuguese Football Federation) Sporting |
| | FW | Manuel Galhofas | 26 June 1960 (aged 17) | | | (Portuguese Football Federation) Benfica |
| | FW | João dos Santos | 18 October 1959 (aged 18) | | | (Portuguese Football Federation) Benfica |

=== Scotland ===
Head coach:

== Group B ==
=== Greece ===
Head coach:

=== Netherlands ===
Head coach:

=== Norway ===
Head coach:

=== Soviet Union ===
Head coach:

| No. | Pos. | Player | Date of birth (age) | Caps | Goals | Club |
|---|---|---|---|---|---|---|
| | GK | **Viktor Chanov** | 21 July 1959 (aged 18) | | | (Football Federation of the Soviet Union) Shakhtyor Donetsk |
| | DF | **Viktor Yanushevsky** | 23 January 1960 (aged 18) | | | (Football Federation of the Soviet Union) Dinamo Minsk |
| | DF | Aleksandr Golovnya | 20 November 1959 (aged 18) | | | (Football Federation of the Soviet Union) Gomselmash Gomel |
| | DF | **Ashot Khachatryan** | 3 August 1959 (aged 18) | | | (Football Federation of the Soviet Union) Ararat Erevan |
| | DF | Sergey Ovchinnikov | 25 October 1960 (aged 17) | | | (Football Federation of the Soviet Union) SKA Kiev |
| | DF | Gennady Salov | 2 February 1960 (aged 18) | | | (Football Federation of the Soviet Union) Torpedo Moscow |
| | MF | **Igor Ponomaryov** | 24 February 1960 (aged 18) | | | (Football Federation of the Soviet Union) Neftchi Baku |
| | MF | Yaroslav Dumansky | 4 August 1959 (aged 18) | | | (Football Federation of the Soviet Union) Karpaty Lvov |
| | MF | Mikhail Olefirenko | 6 June 1960 (aged 17) | | | (Football Federation of the Soviet Union) Dinamo Kiev |
| | MF | Valery Zubenko | 27 August 1959 (aged 18) | | | (Football Federation of the Soviet Union) Zorya Voroshilovgrad |
| | FW | Oleg Taran | 11 January 1960 (aged 18) | | | (Football Federation of the Soviet Union) Dinamo Kiev |
| | FW | **Igor Gurinovich** | 5 March 1960 (aged 18) | | | (Football Federation of the Soviet Union) Dinamo Minsk |
| | FW | **Sergey Stukashov** | 12 November 1959 (aged 18) | | | (Football Federation of the Soviet Union) Kairat Alma-Ata |

== Group C ==
=== Belgium ===
Head coach:

=== Hungary ===
Head coach:

=== Iceland ===
Head coach:

=== Yugoslavia ===
Head coach:

| No. | Pos. | Player | Date of birth (age) | Caps | Goals | Club |
|---|---|---|---|---|---|---|
| | GK | **Tomislav Ivković** | 11 August 1960 (aged 17) | | | (Football Association of Yugoslavia) Dinamo Zagreb |
| | GK | Igor Mrkun | | | | (Football Association of Yugoslavia) Olimpija Ljubljana |
| | DF | Robert Juričko | 27 August 1959 (aged 18) | | | (Football Association of Yugoslavia) Hajduk Split |
| | DF | Ante Rumora | 4 June 1960 (aged 17) | | | (Football Association of Yugoslavia) NK Zagreb |
| | DF | **Marko Elsner** | 11 April 1960 (aged 18) | | | (Football Association of Yugoslavia) Olimpija Ljubljana |
| | DF | **Mirza Kapetanović** | 30 June 1960 (aged 17) | | | (Football Association of Yugoslavia) FK Sarajevo |
| | DF | Predrag Milovanović | | | | |
| | MF | Nikola Duvnjak | | | | |
| | MF | Milan Ičin | 8 August 1960 (aged 17) | | | (Football Association of Yugoslavia) RFK Novi Sad |
| | MF | **Milan Janković** | 31 December 1959 (aged 18) | | | (Football Association of Yugoslavia) NK Maribor |
| | MF | **Mehmed Baždarević** | 28 September 1960 (aged 17) | | | (Football Association of Yugoslavia) Željezničar Sarajevo |
| | MF | **Ivan Gudelj** | 21 September 1960 (aged 17) | | | (Football Association of Yugoslavia) Hajduk Split |
| | MF | **Marko Mlinarić** | 1 September 1960 (aged 17) | | | (Football Association of Yugoslavia) Dinamo Zagreb |
| | FW | Haris Smajić | 8 March 1960 (aged 18) | | | (Football Association of Yugoslavia) FK Sarajevo |
| | FW | Željko Stanić | | | | (Football Association of Yugoslavia) Proleter Zrenjanin |

== Group D ==
=== England ===
Head coach:

| No. | Pos. | Player | Date of birth (age) | Caps | Goals | Club |
|---|---|---|---|---|---|---|
| 1 | GK | Iain Hesford | 4 March 1960 (aged 18) | | | (The Football Association) Blackpool |
| 2 | DF | Ray Ranson | 12 June 1960 (aged 17) | | | (The Football Association) Manchester City |
| 3 | DF | Alan Weir | 1 September 1959 (aged 18) | | | (The Football Association) Sunderland |
| 4 | DF | Bryan Klug | 8 October 1960 (aged 17) | | | (The Football Association) Ipswich Town |
| 5 | DF | Danis Salman | 12 March 1960 (aged 18) | | | (The Football Association) Brentford |
| 6 | MF | Tony Gale | 19 November 1959 (aged 18) | | | (The Football Association) Fulham |
| 7 | MF | Vince Hilaire | 10 October 1959 (aged 18) | | | (The Football Association) Crystal Palace F.C. |
| 8 | MF | **Terry Fenwick** | 17 November 1959 (aged 18) | | | (The Football Association) Crystal Palace F.C. |
| 9 | FW | Andy Ritchie | 28 November 1960 (aged 17) | | | (The Football Association) Manchester United |
| 10 | FW | Jason Seacole | 11 April 1960 (aged 18) | | | (The Football Association) Oxford United |
| 11 | MF | Steve Burke | 29 September 1960 (aged 17) | | | (The Football Association) Nottingham Forest |

=== Poland ===
Head coach: (Poland) Edmund Zientara

| No. | Pos. | Player | Date of birth (age) | Caps | Goals | Club |
|---|---|---|---|---|---|---|
| | GK | **Jacek Kazimierski** | 17 August 1959 (aged 18) | | | (Polish Football Association) Legia Warszawa |
| | GK | **Janusz Stawarz** | 1 December 1959 (aged 18) | | | (Polish Football Association) Stal Mielec |
| | DF | Krzysztof Jarosz | 19 August 1959 (aged 18) | | | (Polish Football Association) Śląsk Wrocław |
| | DF | Antoni Kot | 10 August 1960 (aged 17) | | | (Polish Football Association) Hutnik Kraków |
| | DF | Marek Glanowski | 1 January 1960 (aged 18) | | | (Polish Football Association) Hutnik Kraków |
| | DF | Bogusław Skiba | 16 November 1960 (aged 17) | | | (Polish Football Association) Stal Rzeszów |
| | DF | **Marek Chojnacki** | 6 December 1959 (aged 18) | | | (Polish Football Association) ŁKS Łódź |
| | DF | Ryszard Szewczyk | 3 April 1960 (aged 18) | | | (Polish Football Association) Arka Gdynia |
| | MF | **Kazimierz Buda** | 3 May 1960 (aged 18) | | | (Polish Football Association) Stal Mielec |
| | MF | **Andrzej Buncol** | 21 September 1959 (aged 18) | | | (Polish Football Association) Piast Gliwice |
| | MF | Jan Janiec | 31 August 1959 (aged 18) | | | (Polish Football Association) Zagłębie Wałbrzych |
| | MF | **Krzysztof Kajrys** | 20 September 1959 (aged 18) | | | (Polish Football Association) Ruch Chorzów |
| | MF | Zbigniew Kruszyński | 14 October 1959 (aged 18) | | | (Polish Football Association) Lechia Gdańsk |
| | FW | **Krzysztof Baran** | 26 July 1960 (aged 17) | | | (Polish Football Association) Gwardia Warszawa |
| | FW | Joachim Hutka | 22 March 1960 (aged 18) | | | (Polish Football Association) Górnik Zabrze |
| | FW | **Andrzej Iwan** | 10 November 1959 (aged 18) | | | (Polish Football Association) Wisła Kraków |

=== Spain ===
Head coach:

| No. | Pos. | Player | Date of birth (age) | Caps | Goals | Club |
|---|---|---|---|---|---|---|
| | GK | Agustín Rodríguez | 10 September 1959 (aged 18) | | | (Royal Spanish Football Federation) Castilla |
| | DF | Arseni Comas | 28 June 1961 (aged 16) | | | (Royal Spanish Football Federation) Girona |
| | DF | Manolo Martínez | 29 October 1960 (aged 18) | | | (Royal Spanish Football Federation) Barcelona B |
| | DF | Francis García | 9 February 1960 (aged 18) | | | (Royal Spanish Football Federation) Granada |
| | DF | **Miguel Tendillo** | 1 February 1961 (aged 17) | | | (Royal Spanish Football Federation) Mestalla |
| | MF | Marcelino | 10 April 1960 (aged 18) | | | (Royal Spanish Football Federation) Barcelona B |
| | MF | Javier Zubillaga | 12 August 1959 (aged 18) | | | (Royal Spanish Football Federation) Real Sociedad |
| | MF | Manuel Zúñiga | 19 July 1960 (aged 17) | | | (Royal Spanish Football Federation) Calvo Sotelo |
| | MF | Biri | 14 September 1959 (aged 18) | | | (Royal Spanish Football Federation) Algeciras |
| | FW | Luis Enrique Marián | 19 December 1959 (aged 18) | | | (Royal Spanish Football Federation) Rayo Vallecano |
| | FW | Modesto Pérez | 7 November 1959 (aged 18) | | | (Royal Spanish Football Federation) Getafe |

=== Turkey ===
Head coach:
