= 1979 FIFA World Youth Championship final =

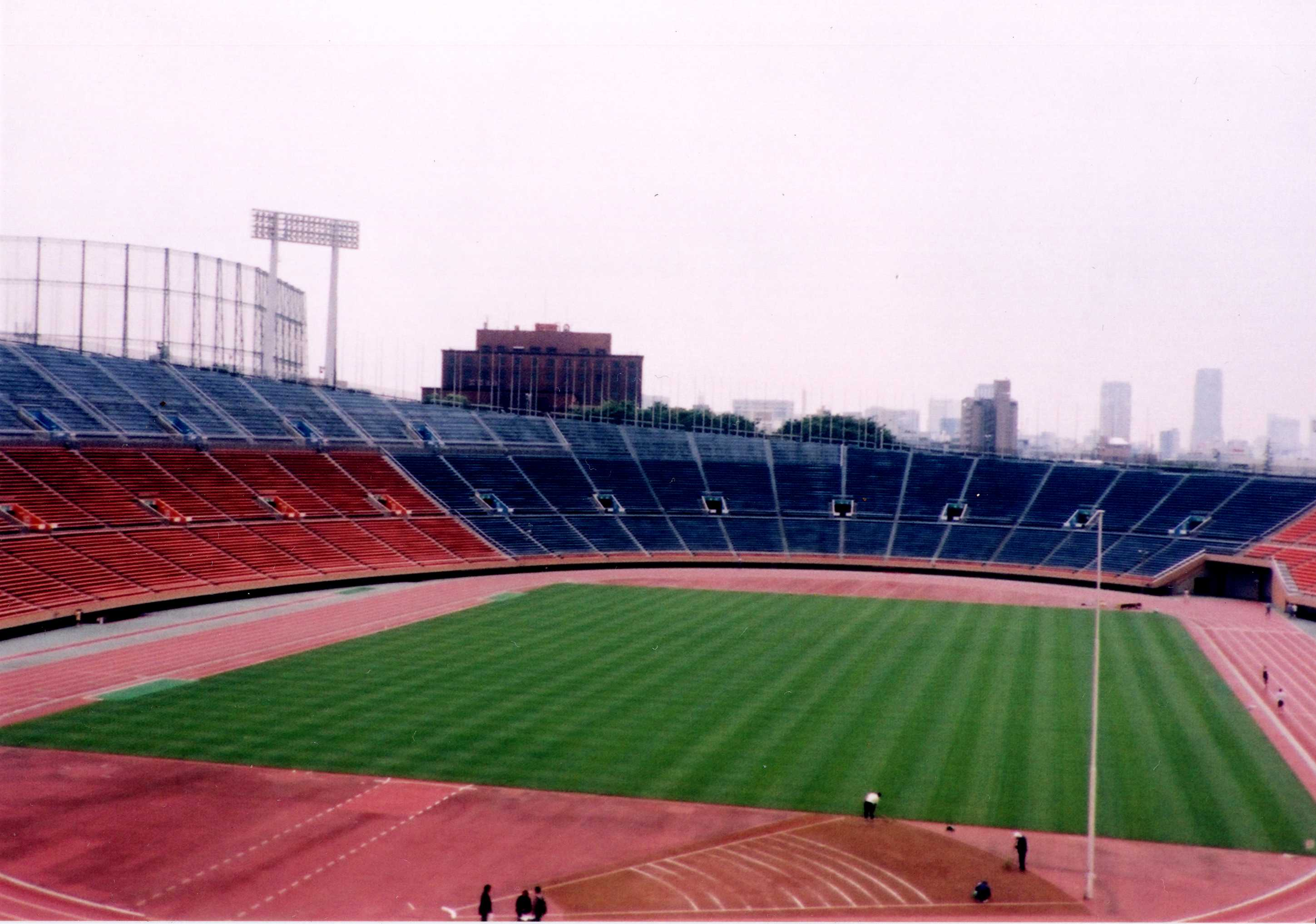
- National Stadium of Tokyo, venue of the match
- Event: 1979 FIFA World Youth Championship
Argentina	Soviet Union
(Argentina)	(Soviet Union)
3	1
- Date: 7 September 1979; 19:00
- Venue: National Stadium, Tokyo
- Referee: José Roberto Wright (Brazil)
- Attendance: 52,000

The 1979 FIFA World Youth Championship final was a football match that was played on at the National Stadium, Tokyo, Japan on 7 September 1979 to determine the champions of the 1979 FIFA World Youth Championship. The final was contested by Argentina and the Soviet Union. Argentina won the match 3–1, winning the title for the first time.

Argentina's rising superstar Diego Maradona, who scored a goal, was named the best player of the competition.

== Background ==
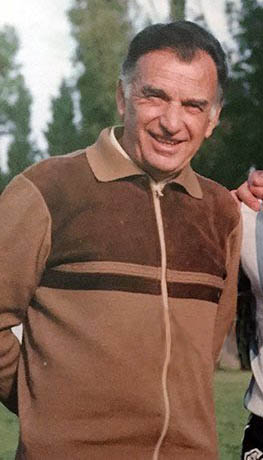
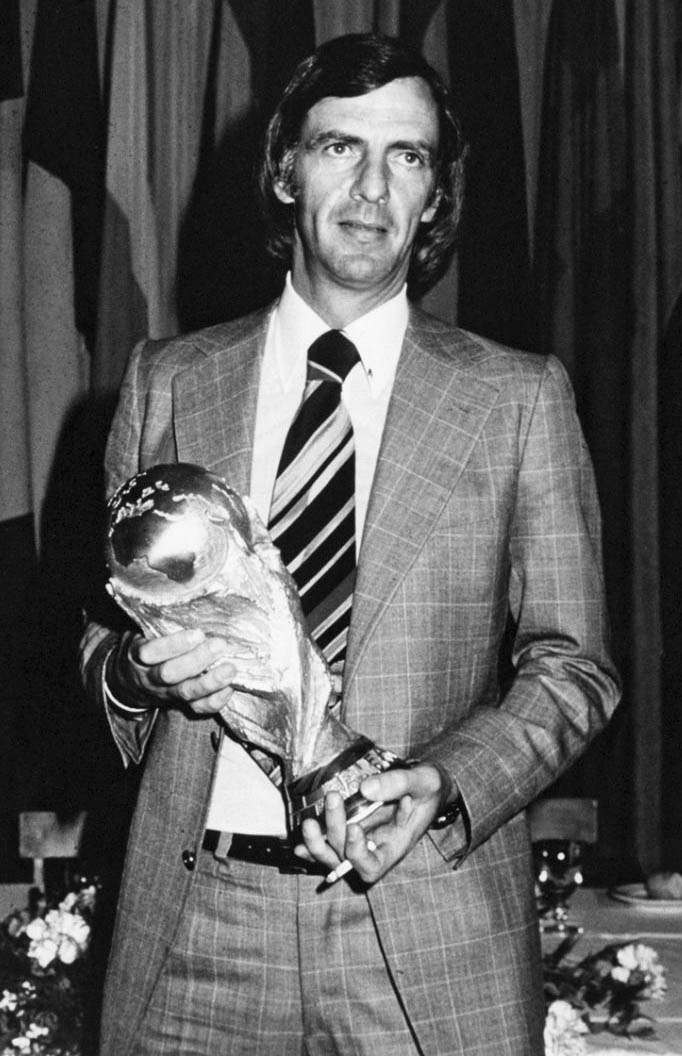
Ernesto Duchini (left) chose the players that were then coached by César Menotti (right)

Argentina had won its first FIFA World Cup just one year before. César Luis Menotti, who had managed the senior squad that crowned champion in Argentina, coached the team. Ernesto Duchini –who was part of the coaching staff to discover new talents around the country– had selected the players that were then under the guidance of Menotti to win the title.

Duchini had been in charge of Argentine youth teams since 1954, and was a cornerstone of the coaching staff that led that group of players to achieve their first title. Some of the players discovered by Duchini were Roberto Perfumo, Carlos García Cambón, Oscar Más, Rubén Ayala, Oscar Ortiz, Jorge Olguín, Raúl Savoy, among others.

Duchini worked side-by-side with Miguel Gitano Juárez, former player of Rosario Central and very close to Menotti. Juárez suggested some players for the youth team, such as Juan Simón, Rubén Rossi, Rafael Seria and Daniel Sperandío, all of them playing in Rosario-based clubs.

The players selected to play the tournament were goalkeepers Sergio García (Flandria) and Rafael Seria (Central Córdoba); defenders Juan Simón (Newell's), Rubén Rossi (Colón), Abelardo Carabelli (Argentinos Juniors), Hugo Alves (Boca Juniors), Marcelo Bachino (Boca Juniors), Jorge Piaggio (Atlanta); midfielders Daniel Sperandío (Rosario Central), Juan Barbas (Racing), Osvaldo Rinaldi (San Lorenzo), Juan José Meza (Central Norte de Tucumán); Diego Maradona (Argentinos Juniors); forwards Osvaldo Escudero (Chacarita), Alfredo Torres (Atlanta), Ramón Díaz (River Plate), Gabriel Calderón (Racing), José Luis Lanao (Vélez).

Diego Maradona was the playmaker and leader of that team. His performance in the competition was so stunning that was awarded the Golden Ball as the best player of the tournament. He also won the Silver Boot as the second topscorer behind teammate Ramón Díaz.

== Road to the final ==
Argentina
Round
Soviet Union
Opponent
Result
Group stage
Opponent
Result
Indonesia
5–0
Match 1
Hungary
5–1
Yugoslavia
1–0
Match 2
Guinea
3–0
Poland
4–1
Match 3
Uruguay
0–1
Group B winners

Team	Pts	Pld	W	D	L	GF	GA	GD
Argentina	6	3	3	0	0	10	1	+9
Poland	4	3	2	0	1	9	4	+5
Yugoslavia	2	3	1	0	2	5	3	+2
Indonesia	0	3	0	0	3	0	16	−16

Final standings
Group D runners-up

Team	Pts	Pld	W	D	L	GF	GA	GD
Uruguay	6	3	3	0	0	8	0	+8
Soviet Union	4	3	2	0	1	8	2	+6
Hungary	2	3	1	0	2	3	7	–4
Guinea	0	3	0	0	3	0	10	−10

Opponent
Result
Knockout stage
Opponent
Result
Algeria
5–0
Quarter finals
Paraguay
2–2 (aet) (6–5 pen.)
Uruguay
2–0
Semi-finals
Poland
1–0

== Match details ==
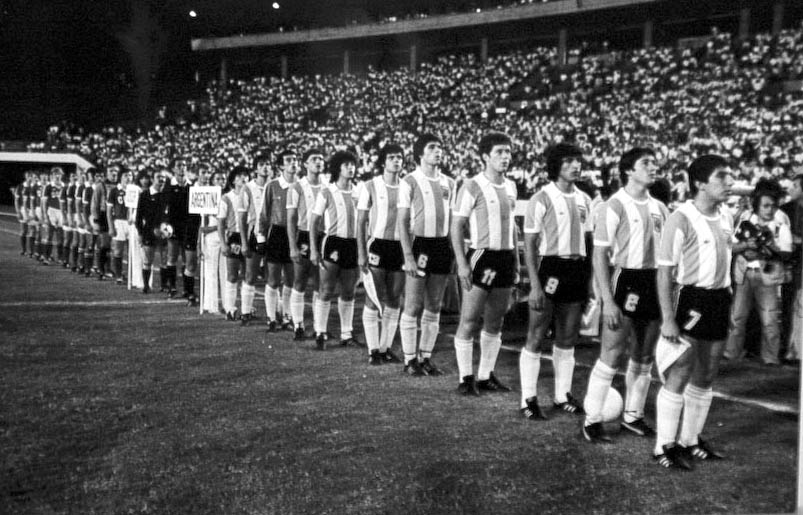
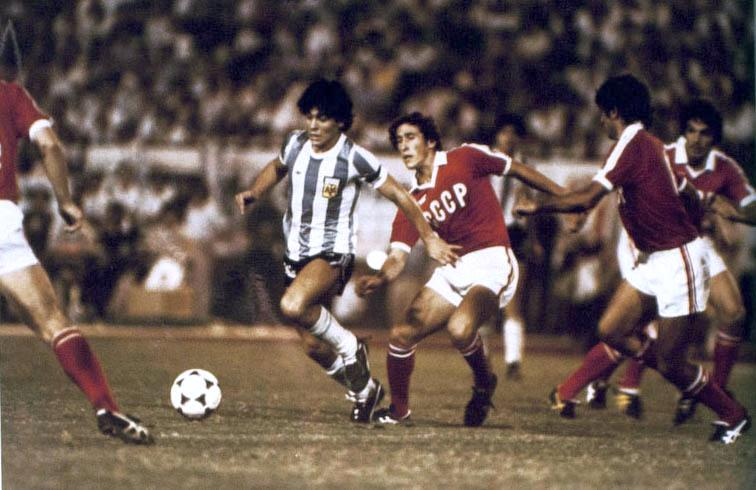
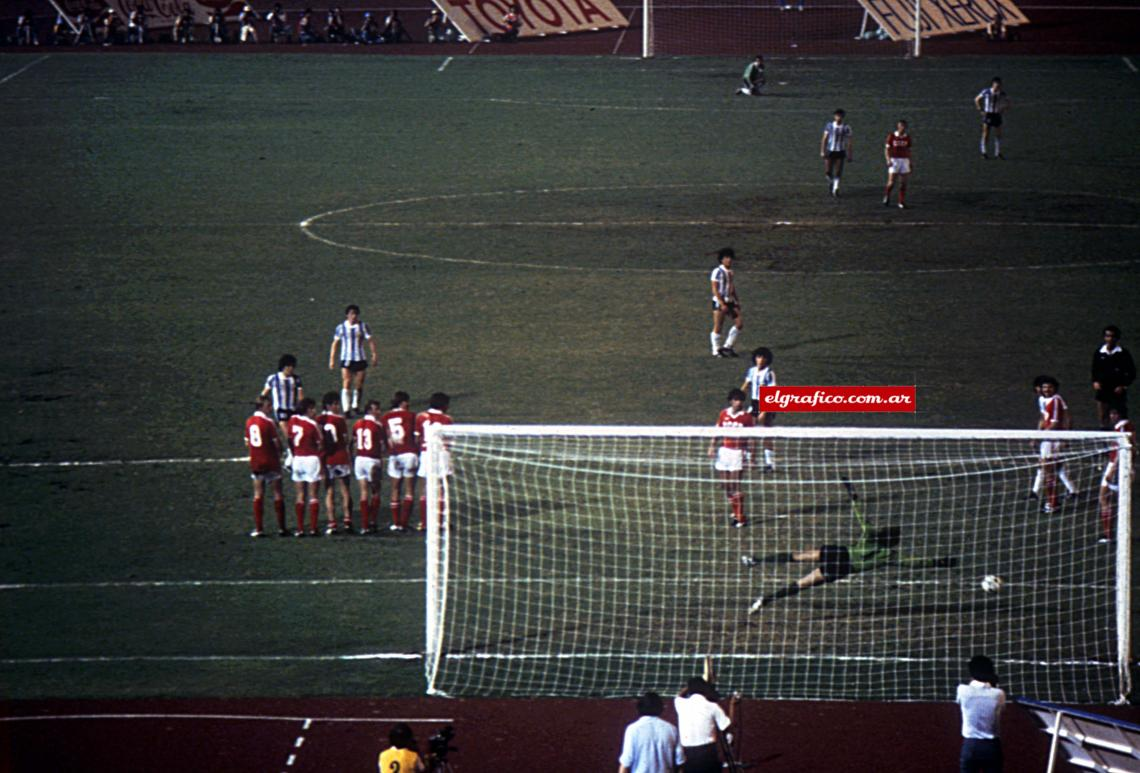
(Left): Both teams starting line-ups; (center): Diego Maradona carrying the ball surrounded by Soviet players; (right): Maradona scoring by free kick
7 September 1979
19:00 JST (UTC+9)

Argentina	3–1	Soviet Union
Alves 68'; Díaz 71'; Maradona 76'	Report	Ponomaryov 52'

National Stadium, Tokyo
Attendance: 52,000
Referee: José Roberto Wright (Brazil)

Argentina	Soviet Union

GK	1	Sergio García
DF	4	Abelardo Carabelli
DF	2	Juan Simón
DF	6	Rubén Rossi
DF	3	Hugo Alves
MF	8	Juan Barbas
MF	13	Osvaldo Rinaldi	Substituted off
MF	10	Diego Maradona
FW	7	Osvaldo Escudero
FW	9	Ramón Díaz
FW	11	Gabriel Calderón
Substitutions:
MF	17	Juan J. Meza	Substituted on
GK	12	Rafael Seria
DF	13	Jorge Piaggio
MF	5	Daniel Sperandío
DF	15	Marcelo Bachino
FW	16	Alfredo Torres
FW	18	José Lanao
Coach:
(Argentina) César Menotti

GK	1	Viktor Chanov
DF	14	Sergey Ovchinnikov
DF	2	Viktor Yanushevsky	Substituted off
DF	4	Ashot Khachatryan
DF	5	Aleksandr Polukarov
MF	15	Anatoliy Radenko
MF	6	Yaroslav Dumanskyi	Substituted off
MF	8	Igor Ponomaryov
FW	13	Sergei Stukashov
FW	10	Oleh Taran
FW	11	Ihar Hurynovich
Substitutions:
MF	7	Mykhaylo Olefirenko	Substituted on
MF	16	Vladimir Mikhalevsky	Substituted on
GK	18	Serhiy Krakovskyi
DF	3	Alexander Golovnia
DF	12	Gennadiy Salov
MF	17	Oleksandr Zavarov
FW	9	Valeriy Zubenko
Coach:
(Soviet Union) Sergei Korshunov

Match rules:

- 90 minutes
- 30 minutes of extra time if necessary
- Penalty shoot-out if scores still level
- Five named eligible substitutes
- Maximum of two substitutions

Sources:

- FIFA (Argentina squad)
- FIFA (Soviet Union squad)

== Aftermath ==
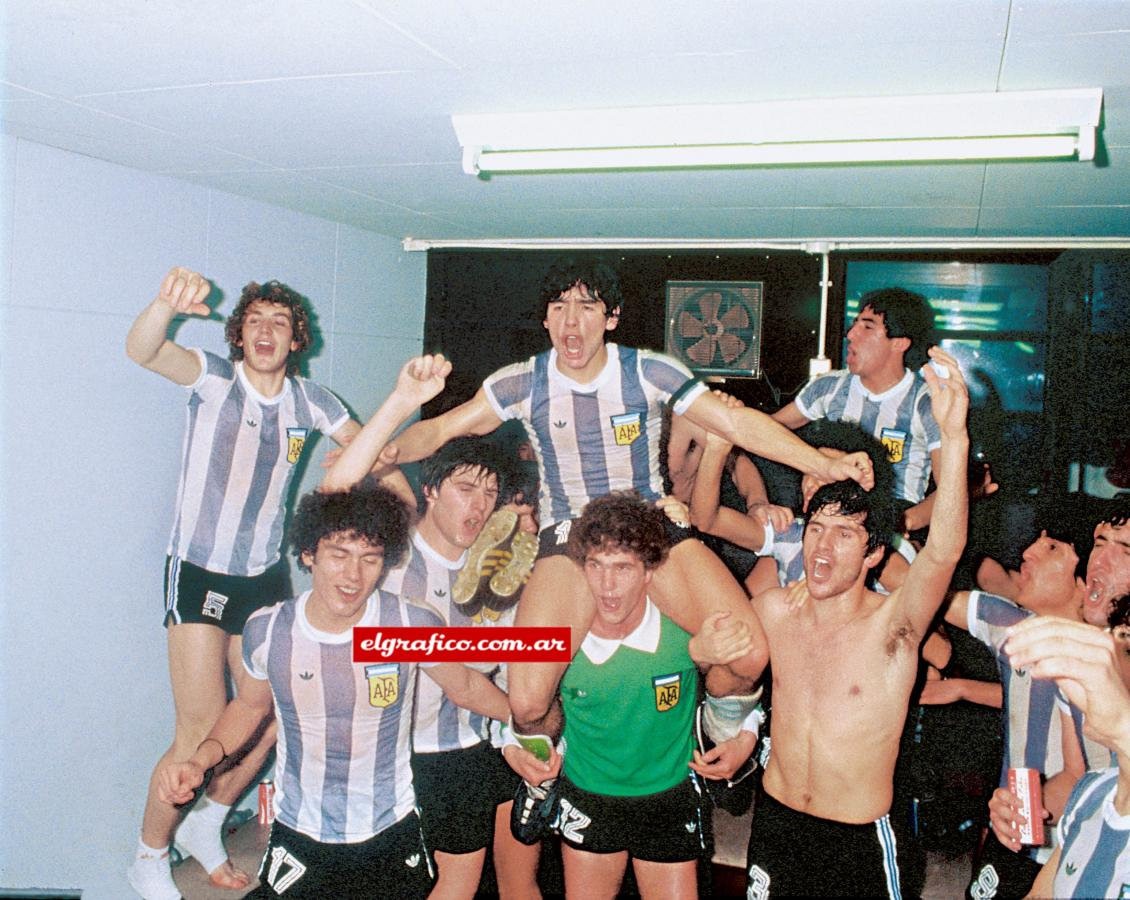
The Argentine players celebrating after the match

The second world title within two years were widely celebrated by people throughout the country, as they had done the previous year after the win against the Netherlands.

The media also praised the team's style of play, attributed to Menotti's philosophy toward the game.

Sirs, you are already champions, I don't mind the result of this game because you have shown that you are the best in the world. Nothing to hit kicks or to do crazy things; let's go, play and amuse the 35,000 Japanese at the grandstands

— Manager César Menotti's talk to the players before the final match.

Beyond the great performance of the team in general, media focused on the performances of Argentinos Juniors' star Diego Maradona (highlighting his control of the ball, passing and dribbling) and Ramón Díaz's scoring prowess at the tournament.

At their returning from Japan, the players were carried in helicopter to the Atlanta stadium, where the flagship landed on the field as part of the celebrations for the championship won in Tokyo.

== See also ==
- 1979 FIFA World Youth Championship
