= 1984 Soviet Top League =

47th season of top-tier football league in Soviet Union

Soviet Top League
- Season: 1984
- Champions: Zenit Leningrad (1st title)
- Relegated: Pakhtakor Tashkent, CSKA Moscow
- European Cup: Zenit Leningrad
- Cup Winners' Cup: Dinamo Kiev
- UEFA Cup: Spartak Moscow; Dnepr Dnepropetrovsk; Chernomorets Odessa
- Matches: 306
- Goals: 767 (2.51 per match)
- Top goalscorer: (19) Sergey Andreyev (SKA)

The 1984 Soviet Top League was the 15th season of the Soviet Top League and 47th since the start of the Soviet top-tier club competitions. It started on March 10 and continued until November 24.

Zenit Leningrad won their first league title, while the defending champion Dnepr Dnepropetrovsk finished third. The league was composed of 18 teams and draw limit was implemented this season of 10 games. There were only allowed two substitutions. Footballers who were on a team list for one team, during the season were not allowed to compete for another except for those who were demobilized from the Soviet Army (sic) and returned to their home club. Those athletes transferred during the season were not allowed to play against the team for which they played earlier.

== Teams ==
=== Promoted teams ===
- FC Kairat Alma-Ata – champion (returning after a season)
- SKA Rostov-na-Donu – 2nd place (returning after two seasons)

=== Location ===
Locations of teams in the 1984 Top League

== League standings ==
Pos	Team	Pld	W	D	L	GF	GA	GD	Pts	Qualification or relegation
1	(Russian Soviet Federative Socialist Republic) Zenit Leningrad (C)	34	19	9	6	60	32	+28	47	Qualification for European Cup first round
2	(Russian Soviet Federative Socialist Republic) Spartak Moscow	34	18	9	7	53	29	+24	45	Qualification for UEFA Cup first round
3	(Ukrainian Soviet Socialist Republic) Dnipro Dnipropetrovsk	34	17	8	9	54	40	+14	42	Qualification for UEFA Cup first round
4	(Ukrainian Soviet Socialist Republic) Chornomorets Odessa	34	16	9	9	49	38	+11	41	Qualification for UEFA Cup first round
5	(Byelorussian Soviet Socialist Republic) Dinamo Minsk (Note: 3 points deducted (10 draw limit))	34	15	13	6	43	28	+15	40 (Note: Dinamo Minsk wins head-to-head against Torpedo)	
6	(Russian Soviet Federative Socialist Republic) Torpedo Moscow	34	15	10	9	43	36	+7	40	
7	(Georgian Soviet Socialist Republic) Dinamo Tbilisi	34	14	8	12	36	41	−5	36	
8	(Kazakh Soviet Socialist Republic) Kairat Alma-Ata	34	13	8	13	44	42	+2	34	
9	(Lithuanian Soviet Socialist Republic) Žalgiris Vilnius (Note: 1 point deducted (10 draw limit))	34	12	11	11	30	38	−8	34 (Note: Žalgiris wins head-to-head against Dynamo Kyiv)	
10	(Ukrainian Soviet Socialist Republic) Dynamo Kyiv	34	12	13	9	46	30	+16	34	Qualification for Cup Winners' Cup first round
11	(Armenian Soviet Socialist Republic) Ararat Yerevan	34	12	7	15	46	50	−4	31	
12	(Ukrainian Soviet Socialist Republic) Metalist Kharkiv	34	12	5	17	42	53	−11	29	
13	(Ukrainian Soviet Socialist Republic) Shakhtar Donetsk	34	10	9	15	47	46	+1	29	
14	(Russian Soviet Federative Socialist Republic) SKA Rostov-on-Don	34	10	7	17	48	58	−10	27	
15	(Azerbaijan Soviet Socialist Republic) Neftchi Baku	34	9	8	17	30	50	−20	26	
16	(Russian Soviet Federative Socialist Republic) Dynamo Moscow	34	8	10	16	35	43	−8	26	
17	(Uzbek Soviet Socialist Republic) Pakhtakor Tashkent (R)	34	10	5	19	37	58	−21	25	Relegation to First League
18	(Russian Soviet Federative Socialist Republic) CSKA Moscow (R)	34	5	9	20	24	55	−31	19	Relegation to First League

Source: www.rsssf.org
Rules for classification: 1) Total points (If two or more teams have equal points for the first place, the winner is determined by additional single round-robin play-off on neutral ground); 2) Total wins; 3) Head-to-head results with consideration of draw limit and goal difference; 4) Total goal difference; 5) Total games scored; 6) Results of reserve squads
(C) Champions; (R) Relegated

== Results ==
Home \ Away	ARA	CHO	CSK	DNI	DYK	DMN	DYN	DTB	KAI	MKH	NEF	PAK	SHA	SKA	SPA	TOR	ŽAL	ZEN
Ararat Yerevan		3–3	2–0	1–3	1–1	1–1	5–2	1–0	2–0	1–0	2–0	4–0	1–0	1–2	1–2	3–2	2–0	1–2
Chornomorets Odessa	2–1		2–1	2–1	1–0	0–2	1–1	4–1	2–1	2–1	2–1	0–0	1–2	3–0	1–0	1–0	2–0	1–3
CSKA Moscow	2–2	1–6		0–0	1–1	0–0	0–0	0–1	1–2	1–3	0–2	0–1	1–0	2–1	0–2	3–4	0–2	0–0
Dnipro	2–0	1–1	1–0		1–3	2–0	3–2	4–1	2–3	2–1	2–1	1–0	2–1	6–2	0–1	1–0	2–2	0–1
Dynamo Kyiv	7–0	1–2	2–1	0–0		0–1	2–1	1–1	0–0	4–0	5–0	2–0	2–2	0–0	0–3	1–0	0–0	1–0
Dinamo Minsk	1–0	1–1	1–0	0–1	1–1		0–0	1–1	4–2	3–1	1–1	1–0	2–2	3–0	1–1	3–0	3–0	1–1
Dynamo Moscow	1–0	0–0	0–1	2–3	1–0	0–1		0–0	1–1	4–1	2–3	5–0	1–0	3–2	0–0	0–1	1–2	0–0
Dinamo Tbilisi	2–0	1–1	2–0	1–0	0–3	2–0	1–1		2–1	1–0	3–1	2–0	1–0	2–1	0–0	1–2	2–0	2–3
Kairat Alma-Ata	1–0	2–0	1–0	1–2	1–1	0–1	2–0	4–0		1–0	2–0	6–2	2–1	2–1	0–0	1–1	3–0	1–1
Metalist Kharkiv	1–0	2–1	4–0	2–1	2–2	1–1	2–1	0–1	3–0		4–0	2–0	2–3	1–0	0–2	0–2	3–2	1–1
Neftçi Baku	0–2	2–1	2–0	0–2	1–0	0–1	1–2	1–1	1–0	2–0		1–0	3–0	0–2	0–2	0–0	0–0	2–2
Pakhtakor Tashkent	2–1	4–1	1–0	2–2	0–1	1–3	3–2	3–0	1–1	0–1	0–0		1–0	4–0	2–1	0–1	4–1	1–4
Shakhtar Donetsk	0–0	1–1	1–2	4–2	1–1	2–0	0–1	2–3	2–0	4–1	3–1	3–2		2–1	1–2	1–1	4–1	1–1
SKA Rostov-on-Don	1–2	2–2	3–3	0–0	0–1	0–0	2–1	1–0	3–1	3–0	2–2	2–2	3–2		1–2	2–4	1–0	2–1
Spartak Moscow	2–0	0–1	1–1	1–1	3–1	3–2	0–0	3–0	3–0	2–0	2–1	2–0	2–2	1–6		0–0	1–2	2–3
Torpedo Moscow	1–1	1–0	1–2	1–1	2–2	0–2	4–0	1–0	2–1	2–2	0–0	3–1	1–0	2–1	0–4		0–0	0–1
Žalgiris Vilnius	1–1	1–0	1–1	2–3	1–0	0–0	1–0	1–1	2–0	0–0	1–0	2–0	0–0	1–0	2–1	0–2		1–0
Zenit Leningrad	6–4	0–1	3–0	2–0	2–0	4–1	1–0	1–0	1–1	4–1	4–1	3–0	1–0	2–1	0–2	1–2	1–1	

Source: football.lg.ua
Legend: Blue = home team win; Yellow = draw; Red = away team win.

== Top scorers ==
19 goals

- Sergey Andreyev (SKA Rostov-on-Don)

18 goals

- Hamlet Mkhitaryan (Ararat)

17 goals

- Oleh Protasov (Dnipro)
- Yuri Tarasov (Metalist)
- Yuri Zheludkov (Zenit)

14 goals

- Andrei Redkous (Torpedo Moscow)

13 goals

- Sergey Rodionov (Spartak Moscow)
- Sergei Stukashov (Kairat)

12 goals

- Georgi Kondratyev (Dinamo Minsk)
- Yevstafi Pekhlevanidi (Kairat)

== Medal squads ==
(league appearances and goals listed in brackets)

1. FC Zenit Leningrad

Goalkeepers: Mikhail Biryukov (34).
Defenders: Aleksei Stepanov (32 / 2), Sergei Vedeneyev (28 / 1), Anatoli Davydov (27 / 1), Vladimir Dolgopolov (27), Sergey Kuznetsov (22), Valeri Zolin (13), Nikolai Vorobyov (8), Gennadi Timofeyev (6).
Midfielders: Valeri Broshin (32 / 4), Yuri Zheludkov (31 / 17), Arkadi Afanasyev (28 / 1), Vyacheslav Melnikov (21 / 3), Dmitri Barannik (19), Nikolay Larionov (9 / 2), Igor Komarov (5 / 2).
Forwards: Sergey Dmitriev (30 / 8), Vladimir Klementyev (29 / 10), Boris Chukhlov (28 / 7), Yuri Gerasimov (7 / 1), Aleksandr Zakharikov (6).

Manager: Pavel Sadyrin.

Transferred out during the season: none.

2. FC Spartak Moscow

Goalkeepers: Rinat Dasayev (34), Stanislav Cherchesov (2), Andrei Mikhalychev (1).
Defenders: Vladimir Sochnov (33 / 2), Aleksandr Bubnov (33 / 1), Gennady Morozov (31), Boris Pozdnyakov (30 / 2), Sergei Bazulev (16), Sergei Shvetsov (11), Sergei Shulgin (3), Almir Kayumov (1).
Midfielders: Yuri Gavrilov (34 / 8), Yevgeni Kuznetsov (34 / 5), Sergey Shavlo (32 / 5), Yevgeni Sidorov (26 / 4), Fyodor Cherenkov (25 / 8), Guram Adzhoyev (13 / 1), Valeri Gladilin (12 / 3), Oleksandr Baranov (2).
Forwards: Sergey Rodionov (32 / 13), Mikhail Rusyayev (6 / 1), Jevgeņijs Miļevskis (6), Oleg Kuzhlev (5).

Manager: Konstantin Beskov.

Transferred out during the season: none.

3. FC Dnipro Dnipropetrovsk

Goalkeepers: Serhiy Krakovskyi (31 / 3), Viktor Konsevich (3).
Defenders: Sergei Bashkirov (32), Serhiy Puchkov (29 / 2), Oleksandr Lysenko (28 / 2), Mykola Pavlov (19 / 1), Ivan Vyshnevskyi (17), Petro Kutuzov (17), Petro Chylibi (9), Andriy Bobrikov (1), Anatoliy Nazarenko (1), Oleksandr Chervonyi (1).
Midfielders: Hennadiy Lytovchenko (33 / 7), Vyktor Kuznetsov (30 / 2), Andriy Dilay (30 / 1), Volodymyr Bahmut (25 / 2), Oleksiy Cherednyk (19 / 2), Oleh Serebryanskyi (13 / 2), Mykola Fedorenko (9), Serhiy Khudozhylov (3), Anatoli Zagrebayev (2), Volodymyr Ustymchyk (2).
Forwards: Oleh Protasov (34 / 17), Volodymyr Lyutyi (30 / 8), Oleh Taran (20 / 7).

One own goal scored by Yuri Lykov (FC SKA Rostov-on-Don).

Manager: Volodymyr Yemets.

Transferred out during the season: Volodymyr Ustymchyk (retired).

== Number of teams by union republic ==
Rank	Union republic	Number of teams	Club(s)
1	RSFSR	6	CSKA Moscow, Dinamo Moscow, SKA Rostov-na-Donu, Spartak Moscow, Torpedo Moscow, Zenit Leningrad
2	Ukrainian SSR	5	Chernomorets Odessa, Dinamo Kiev, Dnepr Dnepropetrovsk, Metallist Kharkov, Shakhter Donetsk
3	Armenian SSR	1	Ararat Yerevan
3	Azerbaijan SSR	1	Neftchi Baku
3	Belarusian SSR	1	Dinamo Minsk
3	Georgian SSR	1	Dinamo Tbilisi
3	Kazakh SSR	1	Kairat Alma-Ata
3	Lithuanian SSR	1	Zhalgiris Vilnius
3	Uzbek SSR	1	Pakhtakor Tashkent

== Attendances ==
No.	Club	Average
1	Dinamo Tbilisi	57,247
2	Zenit	27,288
3	Dnipro	26,382
4	Chornomorets	25,253
5	Shakhtar Donetsk	24,453
6	Dynamo Kyiv	22,624
7	Dinamo Minsk	20,771
8	Metalist Kharkiv	20,565
9	Spartak Moscow	20,100
10	Ararat	15,894
11	Kairat	15,824
12	Neftçhi	14,635
13	Rostov-on-Don	13,324
14	Dynamo Moscow	9,359
15	Žalgiris	8,806
16	Paxtakor	8,353
17	PFC CSKA	8,200
18	Torpedo Moscow	5,476
