= 1979 FIFA World Youth Championship =

1979 FIFAワールドユース選手権
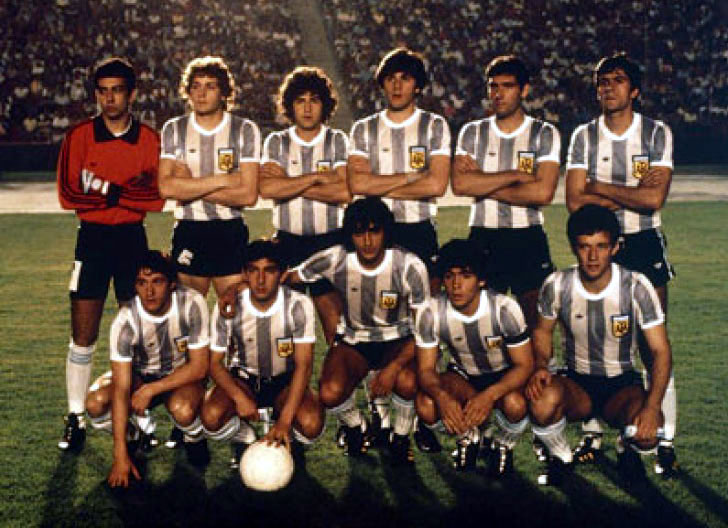
- Argentina, champions

Tournament details
- Host country: Japan
- Dates: 25 August – 7 September
- Teams: 16 (from 5 confederations)
- Venues: 4 (in 4 host cities)

Final positions
- Champions: Argentina (1st title)
- Runners-up: Soviet Union
- Third place: Uruguay
- Fourth place: Poland

Tournament statistics
- Matches played: 32
- Goals scored: 83 (2.59 per match)
- Attendance: 454,500 (14,203 per match)
- Top scorer: (Argentina) Ramón Díaz (8 goals)
- Best player: (Argentina) Diego Maradona
- Fair play award: Poland

The 1979 FIFA World Youth Championship, the second staging of the FIFA World Youth Championship, was held in Japan from 26 August to 7 September 1979. It was the first FIFA tournament played in Asia. The tournament took place in four cities — Kobe, Omiya, Tokyo and Yokohama — where a total of 32 matches were played, four more than in the previous edition due to the addition of a quarterfinal round in the knockout stage.

Argentina won the trophy after beating holders Soviet Union 3–1, in a final held at Tokyo's National Stadium. Argentina fielded an attack-minded high-scoring team, averaging 3.33 goals per game. They were led by the powerful duo of Diego Maradona and Ramón Díaz, who were the tournament's best player and top scorer respectively. Between the two of them, they scored 14 of Argentina's 20 goals (70%).

== Qualification ==
Confederation	Qualifying tournament	Qualifier(s)
AFC (Asia)	Host nation	Japan^{1}
AFC (Asia)	1978 AFC Youth Championship	Indonesia^{1} South Korea^{1}
CAF (Africa)	1979 African Youth Championship	Algeria^{1} Guinea^{1}
CONCACAF (North, Central America & Caribbean)	1978 CONCACAF U-20 Tournament	Canada^{1} Mexico
CONMEBOL (South America)	1979 South American Youth Championship	Argentina^{1} Paraguay^{2} Uruguay
UEFA (Europe)	1978 UEFA European Under-18 Championship	Hungary; Poland^{1} Portugal^{1} Soviet Union; Spain; Yugoslavia^{1}

1.Teams that made their debut.
2.Paraguay qualified by winning an intercontinental qualification group against Australia, the winner of the 1978 OFC U-20 Championship, and Israel.

== Squads ==
For a list of all squads that played in the final tournament, see 1979 FIFA World Youth Championship squads.

== Venues ==
Tokyo	1979 FIFA World Youth Championship is located in Japan	Omiya
National Stadium	1979 FIFA World Youth Championship is located in Japan	Omiya Stadium
Capacity: 48,000	1979 FIFA World Youth Championship is located in Japan	Capacity: 15,500
Kobe	1979 FIFA World Youth Championship is located in Japan	Yokohama
Chuo Stadium	1979 FIFA World Youth Championship is located in Japan	Yokohama Mitsuzawa Football Stadium
Capacity: 13,000	1979 FIFA World Youth Championship is located in Japan	Capacity: 15,000

== Group stage ==
=== Group A ===
Pos	Team	Pld	W	D	L	GF	GA	GD	Pts	Group stage result
1	Spain	3	2	0	1	3	2	+1	4	Advance to knockout stage
2	Algeria	3	1	2	0	2	1	+1	4	Advance to knockout stage
3	Mexico	3	0	2	1	3	4	−1	2	
4	Japan (H)	3	0	2	1	1	2	−1	2	

Source: WorldFootball.net
(H) Hosts
25 August 1979
16:20 JST (UTC+9)

Mexico	1–1	Algeria
Hernández 24'	Report	Yahi 67'

National Stadium, Tokyo
Attendance: 30,000
Referee: Anatoly Milchenko (Soviet Union)

25 August 1979
19:00 JST (UTC+9)

Japan	0–1	Spain
	Report	Zúñiga 51'

National Stadium, Tokyo
Attendance: 30,000
Referee: Marjan Raus (Yugoslavia)

27 August 1979
16:20 JST (UTC+9)

Spain	2–1	Mexico
Joaquín 8'; Gail 74'	Report	Díaz 56'

National Stadium, Tokyo
Attendance: 28,000
Referee: José Roberto Wright (Brazil)

27 August 1979
19:05 JST (UTC+9)

Algeria	0–0	Japan
	Report

National Stadium, Tokyo
Attendance: 32,000
Referee: Héctor Ortíz Ramírez (Paraguay)

29 August 1979
16:20 JST (UTC+9)

Spain	0–1	Algeria
	Report	Bendjaballah 15'

National Stadium, Tokyo
Attendance: 20,000
Referee: Kosasih Kartadiredja (Indonesia)

29 August 1979
19:00 JST (UTC+9)

Japan	1–1	Mexico
Mizunuma 58'	Report	Romero 69'

National Stadium, Tokyo
Attendance: 38,000
Referee: Laszlo Padar (Hungary)

=== Group B ===
Pos	Team	Pld	W	D	L	GF	GA	GD	Pts	Group stage result
1	Argentina	3	3	0	0	10	1	+9	6	Advance to knockout stage
2	Poland	3	2	0	1	9	4	+5	4	Advance to knockout stage
3	Yugoslavia	3	1	0	2	5	3	+2	2	
4	Indonesia	3	0	0	3	0	16	−16	0	

Source: WorldFootball.net
26 August 1979
16:20 JST (UTC+9)

Poland	2–0	Yugoslavia
Pałasz 49'; Frankowski 76'	Report

Omiya Stadium, Omiya
Attendance: 14,000
Referee: Augusto Lamo Castillo (Spain)

26 August 1979
19:00 JST (UTC+9)

Argentina	5–0	Indonesia
Díaz 10', 23', 25'; Maradona 19', 39'	Report

Omiya Stadium, Omiya
Attendance: 15,500
Referee: Rolando Fusco (Canada)

28 August 1979
16:20 JST (UTC+9)

Yugoslavia	0–1	Argentina
	Report	Escudero 55'

Omiya Stadium, Omiya
Attendance: 9,500
Referee: Andre Daina (Switzerland)

28 August 1979
19:00 JST (UTC+9)

Indonesia	0–6	Poland
	Report	Pałasz 11', 37'; Janiec 12'; Baran 22', 31'; Buda 73'

Omiya Stadium, Omiya
Attendance: 9,000
Referee: Kazuo Yasudo (Japan)

30 August 1979
16:20 JST (UTC+9)

Poland	1–4	Argentina
Pałasz 27'	Report	Maradona 7'; Calderón 23', 70'; Simón 35'

Omiya Stadium, Omiya
Attendance: 12,500
Referee: Marcel van Langenhove (Belgium)

30 August 1979
19:00 JST (UTC+9)

Yugoslavia	5–0	Indonesia
Smajić 5', 77'; Milosavljević 19', 63'; Mlinarić 73'	Report

Omiya Stadium, Omiya
Attendance: 7,500
Referee: Toshio Asami (Japan)

=== Group C ===
Pos	Team	Pld	W	D	L	GF	GA	GD	Pts	Group stage result
1	Paraguay	3	2	0	1	6	1	+5	4	Advance to knockout stage
2	Portugal	3	1	1	1	2	3	−1	3	Advance to knockout stage
3	South Korea	3	1	1	1	1	3	−2	3	
4	Canada	3	1	0	2	3	5	−2	2	

Source: WorldFootball.net
25 August 1979
16:20 JST (UTC+9)

Canada	3–1	Portugal
Segota 7', 66'; Nagy 79'	Report	Grilo 46'

Chuo Stadium, Kobe
Attendance: 10,000
Referee: Juan Daniel Cardellino (Uruguay)

25 August 1979
19:00 JST (UTC+9)

Paraguay	3–0	South Korea
Romerito 5'; Cabañas 70', 74'	Report

Chuo Stadium, Kobe
Attendance: 13,000
Referee: Mohamed Hansal (Algeria)

27 August 1979
16:20 JST (UTC+9)

Portugal	1–0	Paraguay
Ferreira 23'	Report

Chuo Stadium, Kobe
Attendance: 5,000
Referee: Alojzy Jarguz (Poland)

27 August 1979
19:00 JST (UTC+9)

South Korea	1–0	Canada
Lee Tae-ho 63'	Report

Chuo Stadium, Kobe
Attendance: 5,000
Referee: George Joseph (Malaysia)

29 August 1979
16:20 JST (UTC+9)

Canada	0–3	Paraguay
	Report	Romerito 37', 58'; Isasi 40'

Chuo Stadium, Kobe
Attendance: 7,500
Referee: Morisaburo Kuramochi (Japan)

29 August 1979
19:00 JST (UTC+9)

Portugal	0–0	South Korea
	Report

Chuo Stadium, Kobe
Attendance: 7,500
Referee: Mario Rubio Vázquez (Mexico)

=== Group D ===
Pos	Team	Pld	W	D	L	GF	GA	GD	Pts	Group stage result
1	Uruguay	3	3	0	0	8	0	+8	6	Advance to knockout stage
2	Soviet Union	3	2	0	1	8	2	+6	4	Advance to knockout stage
3	Hungary	3	1	0	2	3	7	−4	2	
4	Guinea	3	0	0	3	0	10	−10	0	

Source: WorldFootball.net
26 August 1979
16:20

Soviet Union	5–1	Hungary
Ponomaryov 24'; Stukashov 41'; Zavarov 57'; Taran 71', 78'	Report	Kardos 9'

Yokohama Mitsuzawa Football Stadium, Yokohama
Attendance: 7,000
Referee: Arturo Andrés Ithurralde (Argentina)

26 August 1979
19:00

Uruguay	5–0	Guinea
Molina 7'; Revelez 22', 74'; Paz 53'; Vargas 76'	Report

Yokohama Mitsuzawa Football Stadium, Yokohama
Attendance: 8,000
Referee: Melvyn D'Souza (India)

28 August 1979
16:20

Hungary	0–2	Uruguay
	Report	Vargas 23'; Paz 35'

Yokohama Mitsuzawa Football Stadium, Yokohama
Attendance: 4,000
Referee: Marcel van Langenhove (Belgium)

28 August 1979
19:00

Guinea	0–3	Soviet Union
	Report	Olefirenko 6'; Mikhalevsky 59'; Radenko 80'

Yokohama Mitsuzawa Football Stadium, Yokohama
Attendance: 4,000
Referee: Suk Han-Kyu (South Korea)

30 August 1979
16:20

Soviet Union	0–1	Uruguay
	Report	Martínez 66'

Yokohama Mitsuzawa Football Stadium, Yokohama
Attendance: 5,000
Referee: César Correia Diaz da Luz (Portugal)

30 August 1979
19:00

Hungary	2–0	Guinea
Segesvári 17'; Kerepeczky 80'	Report

Yokohama Mitsuzawa Football Stadium, Yokohama
Attendance: 5,000
Referee: Thomson Chan Tam Sun (Hong Kong)

== Knockout stage ==
Quarter-finals
2 September – National Stadium
Argentina	5
Algeria	0
2 September – Yokohama
Uruguay (a.e.t.)	1
Portugal	0
2 September – Omiya
Spain	0 (3)
Poland (p)	0 (4)
2 September – Kobe
Paraguay	2 (5)
Soviet Union (p)	2 (6)

Semi-finals
4 September – National Stadium
Argentina	2
Uruguay	0
4 September – Kobe
Poland	0
Soviet Union	1

Final
7 September – National Stadium
Argentina	3
Soviet Union	1
Third place
6 September – National Stadium
Uruguay (p)	1 (5)
Poland	1 (3)

=== Quarter-finals ===
2 September 1979
19:00

Spain	0–0 (a.e.t.)	Poland
	Report
Penalties
Pichardo (penalty missed); Gail (penalty scored); Manolo (penalty scored); Zúñiga (penalty scored); Tendillo (penalty missed)	3–4	(penalty scored) Chojnacki; (penalty scored) Buncol; (penalty scored) Jarosz; (penalty missed) Pałasz; (penalty scored) Skrobowski

Omiya Stadium, Omiya
Attendance: 10,000
Referee: José Roberto Wright (Brazil)

2 September 1979
19:00

Argentina	5–0	Algeria
Maradona 25'; Calderón 34'; Díaz 39', 51', 66'	Report

National Stadium, Tokyo
Attendance: 20,000
Referee: George Joseph (Malaysia)

2 September 1979
19:00

Paraguay	2–2 (a.e.t.)	Soviet Union
Romerito 7'; Achucarro 22'	Report	Dumansky 3'; Ponomaryov 70'
Penalties
Miño (penalty missed); Valinotti (penalty scored); Romerito (penalty scored); Giménez (penalty missed); Vera (penalty scored); Olmedo (penalty missed); Mora (penalty scored); Garcia (penalty scored); Isasi (penalty missed)	5–6	(penalty missed) Ponomaryov; (penalty scored) Polukarov; (penalty scored) Ovchinnikov; (penalty scored) Stukashov; (penalty missed) Hurynovich; (penalty missed) Mikhalevsky; (penalty scored) Khachatryan; (penalty scored) Dumanskyi; (penalty scored) Chanov

Chuo Stadium, Kobe
Attendance: 8,500
Referee: André Daina (Switzerland)

2 September 1979
19:00

Uruguay	1–0 (a.e.t.)	Portugal
Paz 94'	Report

Yokohama Mitsuzawa Football Stadium, Yokohama
Attendance: 4,000
Referee: Marcel van Langenhove (Belgium)

=== Semi-finals ===
4 September 1979
19:00

Argentina	2–0	Uruguay
Díaz 52'; Maradona 74'	Report

National Stadium, Tokyo
Attendance: 20,000
Referee: Augusto Lamo Castillo (Spain)

4 September 1979
19:00

Poland	0–1	Soviet Union
	Report	Ponomaryov 50'

Chuo Stadium, Kobe
Attendance: 5,000
Referee: Marcel van Langenhove (Belgium)

=== Third place play-off ===
6 September 1979
19:00

Uruguay	1–1 (a.e.t.)	Poland
Paz 9'	Report	Pałasz 26'
Penalties
	5–3

National Stadium, Tokyo
Attendance: 8,000
Referee: Thomson Chan Tam Sun (Hong Kong)

=== Final ===
7 September 1979
19:00 JST (UTC+9)

Argentina	3–1	Soviet Union
Alves 68'; Díaz 71'; Maradona 76'	Report	Ponomaryov 52'

National Stadium, Tokyo
Attendance: 52,000
Referee: José Roberto Wright (Brazil)

== Result ==
FIFA World Youth Championship 1979 winners

Argentina
First title

== Awards ==
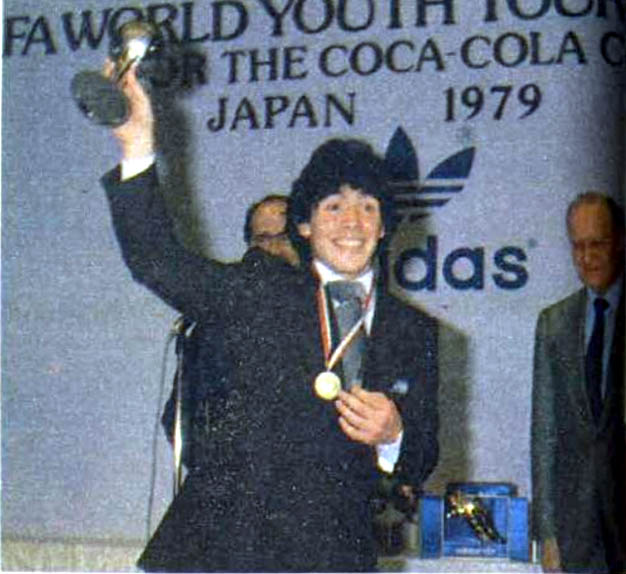
Diego Maradona was awarded the Golden Ball as the best player of the tournament

Golden Shoe	Golden Ball	Fair Play Award
(Argentina) Ramón Díaz	(Argentina) Diego Maradona	Poland

== Goalscorers ==
Ramón Díaz of Argentina won the Golden Boot award for scoring eight goals. In total, 83 goals were scored by 48 different players, with none of them credited as own goal.

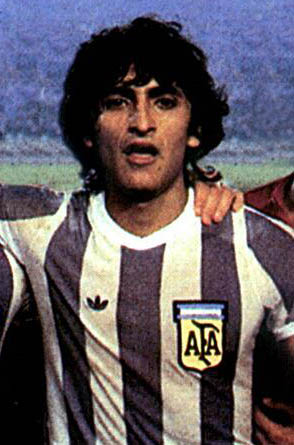
Ramón Díaz, top scorer of the tournament

8 goals

- (Argentina) Ramón Díaz

6 goals

- (Argentina) Diego Maradona

5 goals

- (Poland) Andrzej Pałasz

4 goals

- (Paraguay) Romerito
- (Soviet Union) Igor Ponomaryov
- (Uruguay) Rubén Paz

3 goals

- (Argentina) Gabriel Calderón

2 goals

- (Canada) Branko Segota
- (Paraguay) Roberto Cabañas
- (Poland) Krzysztof Baran
- (Soviet Union) Oleg Taran
- (Uruguay) Ernesto Vargas
- (Uruguay) Felipe Revelez
- (Socialist Federal Republic of Yugoslavia) Haris Smajić
- (Socialist Federal Republic of Yugoslavia) Nedeljko Milosavljević

1 goal

- (Algeria) Derradji Bendjaballah
- (Algeria) Hocine Yahi
- (Argentina) Hugo Alves
- (Argentina) Juan Simón
- (Argentina) Osvaldo Escudero
- (Canada) Louis Nagy
- (Hungary) György Kerepeczky
- (Hungary) József Kardos
- (Hungary) Sándor Segesvári
- (Japan) Takashi Mizunuma
- (South Korea) Lee Tae-Ho
- (Mexico) Armando Romero Manríquez
- (Mexico) Enrique Hernández Velázquez
- (Mexico) Mario Díaz Beltrán
- (Paraguay) Julio Achucarro
- (Paraguay) Ramon Isasi
- (Poland) Jan Janiec
- (Poland) Kazimierz Buda
- (Poland) Krzysztof Frankowski
- (Portugal) Joao Grilo
- (Portugal) Rui Ferreira
- (Soviet Union) Aleksandr Zavarov
- (Soviet Union) Anatoli Radenko
- (Soviet Union) Mikhail Olefirenko
- (Soviet Union) Sergei Stukashov
- (Soviet Union) Vladimir Mikhalevsky
- (Soviet Union) Yaroslav Dumansky
- (Spain) Joaquín Pichardo
- (Spain) Luis Miguel Gail
- (Spain) Manuel Zúñiga
- (Uruguay) Daniel Martínez
- (Uruguay) Hector Molina
- (Socialist Federal Republic of Yugoslavia) Marko Mlinarić

== Final ranking ==
Pos	Team	Pld	W	D	L	GF	GA	GD	Pts	Final result
1	Argentina	6	6	0	0	20	2	+18	12	Champions
2	Soviet Union	6	3	1	2	12	7	+5	7	Runners-up
3	Uruguay	6	4	1	1	10	3	+7	9	Third place
4	Poland	6	2	2	2	10	6	+4	6	Fourth place
5	Paraguay	4	2	1	1	8	3	+5	5	Eliminated in Quarter-finals
6	Spain	4	2	1	1	3	2	+1	5	Eliminated in Quarter-finals
7	Algeria	4	1	2	1	2	6	−4	4	Eliminated in Quarter-finals
8	Portugal	4	1	1	2	2	4	−2	3	Eliminated in Quarter-finals
9	South Korea	3	1	1	1	1	3	−2	3	Eliminated in Group stage
10	Yugoslavia	3	1	0	2	5	3	+2	2	Eliminated in Group stage
11	Mexico	3	0	2	1	3	4	−1	2	Eliminated in Group stage
12	Japan (H)	3	0	2	1	1	2	−1	2	Eliminated in Group stage
13	Canada	3	1	0	2	3	5	−2	2	Eliminated in Group stage
14	Hungary	3	1	0	2	3	7	−4	2	Eliminated in Group stage
15	Guinea	3	0	0	3	0	10	−10	0	Eliminated in Group stage
16	Indonesia	3	0	0	3	0	16	−16	0	Eliminated in Group stage

Source: rsssf.com
(H) Hosts
