= Sergio Ariel Escudero =

Sergio Ariel Escudero may also refer to:

- Sergio Escudero (footballer, born 1964), Argentine-Japanese footballer
- Sergio Escudero (footballer, born 1988), Japanese footballer
