= Sergio Escudero (footballer, born 1988) =

Footballer (born 1988)

Sergio Escudero エスクデロ 競飛王
Personal information
- Full name: Sergio Ariel Escudero
- Date of birth: 1 September 1988 (age 38)
- Place of birth: Granada, Spain
- Height: 1.72 m (5 ft 8 in)
- Positions: Attacking midfielder; striker

Team information
- Current team: Edo All United

Youth career
- 1996–2000: Vélez Sársfield
- 2001–2002: Kashiwa Reysol
- 2004–2005: Urawa Red Diamonds

Senior career*
Years	Team	Apps	(Gls)
2005–2012	Urawa Red Diamonds	81	(7)
2012	→ FC Seoul (loan)	20	(4)
2013–2015	FC Seoul	86	(14)
2015	Jiangsu Sainty	29	(6)
2016–2019	Kyoto Sanga	87	(5)
2018	→ Ulsan Hyundai (loan)	14	(3)
2020–2021	Tochigi SC	30	(0)
2021–2022	Chiangmai United	22	(0)
2022–2023	Atlético Marte	9	(0)
2023	Banyule City SC	0	(0)
2024–2025	North Geelong Warriors FC	0	(0)
2025–	Edo All United	0	(0)

International career
2008	Japan U23	5	(1)
Medal record
Urawa Reds
Winner	AFC Champions League	2007
Winner	J1 League	2006
Runner-up	J1 League	2005
Runner-up	J1 League	2007
Runner-up	J.League Cup	2011
Winner	Emperor's Cup	2005
Winner	Emperor's Cup	2006
- * Club domestic league appearances and goals as of 20 August 2025, 6:45 (UTC)

Sergio Escudero (エスクデロ 競飛王, Esukudero Seruhio; Spanish pronunciation: [ˈseɾxjo eskuˈðeɾo]; born 1 September 1988) is a professional footballer who plays as an attacking midfielder or striker for Kantō Soccer League Division 2 club Edo All United. Born in Spain, he has represented the Japan U23 national team internationally. He is the son of Argentine-Japanese footballer Sergio Ariel Escudero.

== Career ==
When Escudero was three years old, he moved to Japan because of his father's work and joined the local club team. After living in Japan for five years, he moved to Argentina and Escudero began his career with the Vélez Sársfield youth team, where his father, also named Sergio Ariel Escudero and uncle Osvaldo Salvador Escudero have played. Then he was called up to the U-15 Argentina national team training camp.

In 2001, Escudero returned to Japan and joined Kashiwa Reysol junior youth team in Chiba and later moved to Urawa Red Diamonds junior youth team in Saitama. He scored many goals in youth level league matches and contracted with Urawa Reds in 2005. Playing as a forward, Escudero made his debut as a professional on 15 April 2005, against Albirex Niigata at the age of 16 years, 8 months and 21 days and he became the second youngest J. League Division 1 player after Takayuki Morimoto. In 2006, German outfit VfB Stuttgart were interested in him but Urawa refused to release him.

On 11 June 2007, he obtained his Japanese citizenship, and therefore he had a chance to play for the Japan U-20 team at 2007 FIFA U-20 World Cup in Canada. However, he failed to make it to the tournament since the squad was submitted before he became a Japanese citizen. In May 2008, he joined the U-23 national team which played at the 2008 Toulon Tournament and scored a goal against Ivory Coast.

On 17 July 2012, Escudero joined South Korean outfit FC Seoul on a six-month loan deal. He received number 26 and scored his debut goal on 21 July. He scored four goals and provided three assists at the end of the season. His loan was made permanent in December. He scored the opening goal and assisted Dejan Damjanovic's 2–2 equalizer in the 2013 AFC Champions League Final match against China powerhouse Guangzhou Evergrande on 26 October 2013. His impressive performance made him Man of the Match.

On 25 February 2015, Escudero signed a two-year contract with Chinese Super League side Jiangsu Guoxin-Sainty.

On 1 August 2022, Escudero joined a Primera División club C.D. Atlético Marte.

On 20 August 2025, Escudero joined to Kantō Soccer League Division 2 club, Edo All United.

== Personal life ==
The son of former Argentine-Japanese footballer of the same name, he was born to Argentine parents of Spanish descent in Spain, and thus held dual Argentine and Spanish citizenship. In 2007, he acquired Japanese citizenship automatically as a result of his father's naturalization. Escudero is a cousin of Damián Escudero and nephew of Osvaldo Escudero.

== Career statistics ==
=== Club ===
As of the 20 August 2025.

Appearances and goals by club, season and competition
Club	Season	League			FA Cup		League Cup		ACL		Other		Total	
Club	Season	Division	Apps	Goals	Apps	Goals	Apps	Goals	Apps	Goals	Apps	Goals	Apps	Goals
Urawa Red Diamonds	2005	J. League Div 1	5	0	0	0	2	0	—		—		7	0
Urawa Red Diamonds	2006	J. League Div 1	1	0	0	0	3	1	—		0	0	4	1
Urawa Red Diamonds	2007	J. League Div 1	1	0	0	0	0	0	0	0	0	0	1	0
Urawa Red Diamonds	2008	J. League Div 1	13	0	2	1	1	0	1	0	—		17	1
Urawa Red Diamonds	2009	J. League Div 1	23	3	0	0	7	1	—		—		30	4
Urawa Red Diamonds	2010	J. League Div 1	17	3	2	1	3	0	—		—		22	4
Urawa Red Diamonds	2011	J. League Div 1	20	1	0	0	6	1	—		—		26	2
Urawa Red Diamonds	2012	J. League Div 1	1	0	—		0	0	—		—		1	0
Urawa Red Diamonds	Total		81	7	4	2	22	3	1	0	0	0	108	12
FC Seoul	2012	K-League	20	4	0	0	—		—		—		20	4
FC Seoul	2013	K League Classic	34	4	3	0	—		12	2	—		49	6
FC Seoul	2014	K League Classic	32	6	5	1	—		11	2	—		48	9
FC Seoul	2015	K League Classic	0	0	0	0	—		1	1	—		1	1
FC Seoul	Total		86	14	8	1	—		24	5	—		118	20
Jiangsu Sainty	2015	Chinese Super League	29	6	5	0	—		—		—		34	6
Kyoto Sanga	2016	J2 League	38	5	2	1	—		—		—		40	6
Kyoto Sanga	2017	J2 League	21	0	1	0	—		—		—		22	0
Kyoto Sanga	2018	J2 League	15	0	0	0	—		—		—		15	0
Kyoto Sanga	2019	J2 League	12	0	1	0	—		—		—		13	0
Kyoto Sanga	Total		86	5	4	1	—		—		—		90	6
Ulsan Hyundai (loan)	2018	K League 1	10	3	5	0	—		—		—		15	33
Tochigi SC	2020	J2 League	30	0	0	0	—		—		—		30	0
Tochigi SC	2021	J2 League	0	0	0	0	—		—		—		0	0
Tochigi SC	Total		30	0	0	0	—		—		—		30	0
Chiangmai United	2021–22	Thai League 1	22	0	2	0	2	0	—		—		26	0
Atlético Marte	2022–23	Primera División de El Salvador	17	1	—		—		—		—		17	1
Banyule City SC	2023	Victorian State League	0	0	—		—		—		—		0	0
North Geelong Warriors	2024	Victorian Premier League	0	0	—		—		—		—		0	0
North Geelong Warriors	2025	Victorian Premier League	0	0	—		—		—		—		0	0
North Geelong Warriors	Total		0	0	—		—		—		—		0	0
Edo All United	2025	Kantō Soccer League Div 2	0	0	—		—		—		—		0	0
Career total			361	36	28	4	24	3	25	5	0	0	438	48

=== International ===
Appearances and goals by national team and year
National team	Year	Apps	Goals
Japan U23	2008	5	1
Total		5	1

Scores and results list Japan U23's goal tally first, score column indicates score after each Escudero goal.

List of international goals scored by Sergio Escudero
No.	Date	Venue	Opponent	Score	Result	Competition
1	30 May 2008	Stade Mayol, Toulon, France	Ivory Coast	1–1	2–2	2008 Toulon Tournament

== Honours ==
Urawa Red Diamonds

- J. League Division 1: 2006
- Emperor's Cup: 2005, 2006
- AFC Champions League: 2007
- Japanese Super Cup: 2006

FC Seoul

- K League Classic: 2012

Jiangsu Guoxin-Sainty

- Chinese FA Cup: 2015
