= Mario Díaz (footballer, born 1961) =

Mexican footballer (born 1952)

Personal information
- Full name: Mario Díaz Beltrán
- Date of birth: 19 January 1961 (age 65)
- Place of birth: Mexico City, Mexico
- Position: Forward

Youth career
- 1977–1979: Atlético Español

Senior career*
Years	Team	Apps	(Gls)
1979–1982	Atlético Español/Necaxa		
1982–1985	Coyotes Neza	134	(3)
1986–1989	Atlético Potosino	166	(1)
1989–1990	Santos Laguna	166	(1)

International career
1979	Mexico U20	3	(1)
1983–1984	Mexico	6	(4)
- * Club domestic league appearances and goals

Mario Díaz Beltrán (born 19 January 1961) is a Mexican retired footballer. He played as a forward for Necaxa, Coyotes Neza and Atlético Potosino throughout the 1980s. He also represented Mexico internationally at the 1979 FIFA World Youth Championship.

== Club career ==
Like many footballers of the 1970s, Díaz began his career competing within the 1978 Torneo de los Barrios. His uncle, who had connections with Liga MX club Atlético Español, took interest in his nephew's talents and convinced him to play for the senior squad of the club at just 17 years of age. His debut match occurred against Atlético Potosino at the Estadio Azteca. Emerging into the early 1980s, Díaz played alongside other players such as Saúl Rivero, Paco Solís, Alfredo Navarrete, Alejandro Gil, Reginaldo Ramírez, José Manuel Castro. Throughout this time, Díaz scored a hat-trick against Coyotes Neza in the 1979–80 season and remained in the club even as the club's name was restored to Necaxa by the end of the 1981–82 season. As he was looking for a new club, Díaz met Javier Sánchez Galindo and Mario Maldonado who convinced him to sign for the club. Throughout his career with the Coyotes, he earned a reputation of being one of the best forwards of the Liga MX of the 1980s, notably consistently scoring against América. He then switched to Atlético Potosino beginning at the 1986 season where he played alongside players such as Eligio Torres, Sergio Bermúdez and René Isidoro García. His final season was spent with Santos Laguna where he retired with due to concerns regarding his health at time.

== International career ==
Díaz was first called up to represent the Mexico national under-20 football team at the 1979 FIFA World Youth Championship with every player within the squad going on to later have a career in the Liga MX. Throughout the tournament, he scored the only goal against Spain in a 2–1 defeat. Due to a lack of points, the Tricolor were unable to replicate their success at the previous 1977 edition and were eliminated at the group stage. Despite that, Díaz's international career continued into the senior, first called up in a 0–1 victory over Costa Rica on 15 March 1983 as a substitute for Ricardo Márquez Ramos during the era of manager Bora Milutinović. His first international goal occurred in his third appearance in a 2–0 victory over Guatemala on 5 April 1983. Despite only playing six matches, he had one of the best appearance-to-goal ratios in the Tricolor's history as he scored four goals with two of those being from a 5–0 beating over El Salvador on 25 October 1983. This led to talks of including him on the roster for the 1986 FIFA World Cup in which Mexico had recently assumed hosting rights over. However, because of Milutinović's decision to base the squad primarily around players from either América or Pumas UNAM meant that Díaz would be left out of the final roster.
