= Ricardo Márquez =

Ricardo Márquez may refer to:

- Ricardo Márquez (politician) (born 1943), Peruvian businessman and politician
- Ricardo Márquez (Mexican footballer) (born 1956), Mexican footballer
- Ricardo Marquez (police chief) (born 1960), Filipino police chief
- Ricardo Márquez (Colombian footballer) (born 1997), Colombian footballer
