= Lykov =

Lykov (Russian: Лыков) is a Russian male surname, its feminine counterpart is Lykova. It may refer to:

- Lykov family of Russian Old Believers
- Agafia Lykova (born 1944), Russian Old Believer, member of Lykov family
- Maxim Lykov (born 1987), Russian poker player
- Oleh Lykov (born 1973), Ukrainian rower
- Yuri Lykov (born 1961), Russian football coach and a former player
