= Hamlet Mkhitaryan (footballer, born 1962) =

Armenian footballer (1962–1996)

- Mkhitaryan in 1994

Personal information
- Full name: Hamlet Habetnaki Mkhitaryan
- Date of birth: 14 September 1962
- Place of birth: Yerevan, Armenian SSR, USSR
- Date of death: 6 May 1996 (aged 33)
- Place of death: Yerevan, Armenia
- Height: 1.72 m (5 ft 8 in)
- Position: Striker

Senior career*
Years	Team	Apps	(Gls)
1980–1987	Ararat Yerevan	170	(46)
1988–1989	Kotayk Abovian	55	(26)
1989–1994	ASOA Valence	112	(30)
1994–1995	ASA Issy	2	(0)
Total		339	(102)

International career
1994	Armenia	2	(0)
- * Club domestic league appearances and goals

Hamlet Habetnaki Mkhitaryan (Armenian: Համլետ Հաբեթնակի Մխիթարյան, 14 September 1962 – 6 May 1996) was a Soviet and Armenian football player who played as a striker for the Armenia national team and played most of his club career for Armenian Premier League club Ararat Yerevan and CFA 2 club ASOA Valence.

Mkhitaryan was one of the best players of the Soviet Top League during the 1980s, scoring 46 goals for the club, and played for ASOA Valence during the peak of the team in Ligue 2. He is the father of Henrikh Mkhitaryan.

== Club career ==
Hamlet Mkhitaryan started playing for Ararat Yerevan in 1980. At this time, the club had few players who had played for it back in the 1970s, when the team has achieved a number of successes, including winning the 1973 Soviet Top League. Thus, the 1980s were a new era for Ararat Yerevan. Mkhitaryan was a team regular and one of the leaders of the club's attack. In the 1984 Soviet Top League, Mkhitaryan scored 18 goals. The only player who scored more than him was Sergey Andreyev, who scored 19 goals. Editors of the magazine Soviet Warrior awarded Mkhitaryan their newly established prize, Knight of Attack. This award was presented to the football player who had scored most often (per season) three or more goals in a single league match. Mkhitaryan made three hat-tricks and one poker in the 1984 Top League.

In 1988, he moved to Kotayk Abovyan, where he spent half of the season. In July 1989, he went to France, where he later played for ASOA Valence, a club founded by French Armenians. Mkhitaryan is considered one of the first official foreign players from Armenia who went to play in the western, non-Soviet affiliated world (and not emigrated). Abraham Hayrapetyan, who lived in France and was mainly working on arranging tours of Soviet players to Europe, helped him to move to Valence. After Mkhitaryan came to the club, he helped Valence go up from the Championnat National third division to the Ligue 2 second division. Mkhitaryan later joined ASA Issy, another club formed by Armenians in France, which he played on for only six months. He could not continue his career as a football player because of a brain tumor. Knowing he was dying, Hamlet went back to Yerevan, wanting to die at home. After three operations performed within one year, his life could not be saved and he died at the age of 33 on 6 May 1996.

== International career ==
Mkhitaryan debuted for the Armenia national team on 7 September 1994 in a UEFA Euro 1996 qualifying match against Belgium at the Constant Vanden Stock Stadium in Brussels, which Armenia lost 2–0. He played his last game next in another UEFA Euro 1996 qualifier against Cyprus on 8 October 1994 at the Hrazdan Stadium in Yerevan. The match ended 0–0.

== Personal life ==
Hamlet was married to Marina Taschyan. They had two children, a daughter named Monica and a son named Henrikh, who is a professional footballer for Inter Milan and the Armenia national team. The Mkhitaryans lived in the Kentron district of Yerevan. His wife was the head of the national teams department in the Armenian Football Federation and their daughter works at the UEFA headquarters. His son followed in his footsteps and became a football player who went on to captain the Armenia national football team. Those who saw both Hamlet and Henrikh play say that their styles resemble each other very much.
