= Krzysztof Kajrys =

Polish footballer (born 1959)

Personal information
- Date of birth: 20 September 1959 (age 67)
- Place of birth: Chorzów, Poland
- Height: 1.76 m (5 ft 9 in)
- Position: Midfielder

Senior career*
Years	Team	Apps	(Gls)
–1982	Ruch Chorzów		
1983–1987	Widzew Łódź	129	(19)
1988–1991	FC 08 Homburg		

International career
- Poland U18
1981	Poland	3	(1)
Medal record
Men's football
Representing Poland
UEFA European Under-18 Championship
Third place	1978 Poland
- * Club domestic league appearances and goals

Krzysztof Kajrys (born 20 September 1959) is a Polish former footballer who played as a midfielder.

He made three appearances for the Poland national team in 1981.

== Honours ==
Widzew Łódź

- Polish Cup: 1984–85

Poland U18

- UEFA European Under-18 Championship third place: 1978
