= Daniel Revelez =

Uruguayan footballer (born 1959)

Personal information
- Full name: Daniel Felipe Revelez Pereira
- Date of birth: 30 September 1959 (age 67)
- Place of birth: Rocha, Uruguay
- Height: 1.83 m (6 ft 0 in)
- Position: Defender

Senior career*
Years	Team	Apps	(Gls)
1979–1982	Bella Vista		
1983–1985	Deportivo Cali		
1985–1986	Chacarita Juniors	4	(0)
1986	Danubio		
1987	Bella Vista		
1988–1993	Nacional		
1995–1997	Danubio		

International career
1980–1991	Uruguay	21	(1)
- * Club domestic league appearances and goals

Daniel Felipe Revelez Pereira (born 30 September 1959) is a Uruguayan former footballer who played as a defender.

== Club career ==
Born in Rocha, Revelez made his Uruguayan Primera División debut with C.A. Bella Vista. His performances with Bella Vista led to a move abroad to play for Colombian side Deportivo Cali. Two seasons later, he transferred to Argentina to play for Chacarita Juniors. He would return to Uruguay with Danubio F.C. and then Bella Vista. At age 28, Revelez joined Club Nacional de Football where he would win the Copa Libertadores and Intercontinental Cup in 1988.

== International career ==
Revelez made 21 appearances for the senior Uruguay national football team from 1980 to 1991, and was a member of the squad for the 1990 FIFA World Cup finals. He also played in the 1989 and 1991 Copa América.

Revelez also played at the 1979 FIFA World Youth Championship in Japan. He played in Marcelo Salas' farewell match.
