= Krzysztof Baran (footballer, born 1960) =

Polish footballer (born 1960)

Personal information
- Full name: Krzysztof Baran
- Date of birth: 26 July 1960 (age 66)
- Place of birth: Warsaw, Poland
- Height: 1.82 m (6 ft 0 in)
- Position: Forward

Senior career*
Years	Team	Apps	(Gls)
1976–1983	Gwardia Warsaw		
1984–1987	ŁKS Łódź	105	(26)
1987–1988	Górnik Zabrze	42	(14)
1989–1990	AEL	34	(3)
1990–1994	Włókniarz Pabianice		

International career
- Poland U18
1981–1987	Poland	10	(4)
Medal record
Men's football
Representing Poland
UEFA European Under-18 Championship
Third place	1978 Poland
- * Club domestic league appearances and goals

Krzysztof Baran (born 26 July 1960) is a Polish former professional footballer who played as a forward. Besides Poland, he has played in Greece.

== Club career ==
Baran began his career with Gwardia Warsaw, a club for whom he would play several seasons in the Polish Ekstraklasa. He had a spell with AEL in the Alpha Ethniki.

== International career ==
Baran made 10 appearances for the Poland senior national team from 1981 to 1987.

He played for Poland at the 1979 FIFA World Youth Championship in Japan.

== Honours ==
Górnik Zabrze

- Ekstraklasa: 1987–88
- Polish Super Cup: 1988

Poland U18

- UEFA European Under-18 Championship third place: 1978
