= Ricardo Valinotti =

Paraguayan footballer

Personal information
- Full name: Ricardo Valinotti
- Date of birth: 4 May 1958 (age 68)
- Place of birth: Asunción, Paraguay
- Height: 1.79 m (5 ft 10 1/2 in)
- Position: Forward

Senior career*
Years	Team	Apps	(Gls)
1978–1985	Libertad		
1986–1989	Sol de América		
1989–1992	Sport Colombia		
1992–1995	Atlántida		

International career^{‡}
1979	Paraguay U20	4	(0)
1983	Paraguay	1	(0)
- * Club domestic league appearances and goals as of 13 April 2020 ‡ National team caps and goals as of 29 July 2020

Ricardo Valinotti (born 4 May 1960, in Asunción, Paraguay) is a Paraguayan former footballer, who played as a forward.

== Club play ==
Valinotti started his professional career with Club Libertad, in the 1978 Paraguayan Primera División season. After eight seasons with Libertad, Valinotti joined Club Sol de América for their national championship 1986 Paraguayan Primera División season. In 1989 he was signed by Sport Colombia, then joined Atlántida in 1992, retiring with them in 1995.

== International ==
Valinotti was a member of the Paraguay national U-20 squad that competed in the 1979 FIFA World Youth Championship and was also part of the Paraguay national football team that participated in the 1983 Copa América.
