= Carlos Parente =

Portuguese footballer

Personal information
- Full name: Carlos Alberto Bastos Parente
- Date of birth: 8 April 1961 (age 65)
- Place of birth: Luanda, Angola
- Height: 1.78 m (5 ft 10 in)
- Position: Midfielder

Youth career
- 1977–1978: Sintrense
- 1978–1979: Benfica

Senior career*
Years	Team	Apps	(Gls)
1979–1980	Estoril	30	(2)
1980–1984	Académica	92	(2)
1984–1991	Boavista	143	(20)
1991–1994	Salgueiros	29	(1)
1994–1995	Marco	21	(0)
Total		315	(25)

International career
1979	Portugal U20	2	(0)
1981	Portugal U21	2	(0)
1987	Portugal	2	(0)
- * Club domestic league appearances and goals

Carlos Alberto Bastos Parente (born 8 April 1961) is a Portuguese retired footballer who played as a central midfielder.

== Club career ==
Born in Luanda, Portuguese Angola, Parente signed for G.D. Estoril-Praia after a one-year youth spell at S.L. Benfica, and the 18-year-old did not miss one single match in the 1979–80 campaign, with the club being nonetheless relegated from the Primeira Liga. He then moved to Académica de Coimbra, meeting the same fate in his first season and playing a further three years with the Students in the Segunda Liga.

Parente joined Boavista F.C. in the summer of 1984, going on to remain in the top division for one decade, also having represented Porto neighbours S.C. Salgueiros. Whilst with the former, in 1987–88, he scored a career-best nine goals in 33 games to help the team to finish in fifth position, narrowly missing on qualification for the UEFA Cup; he retired from professional football at the age of 33, amassing top-flight totals of 229 matches and 24 goals.

== International career ==
Following the defection of practically all of the international players after the infamous Saltillo Affair at the 1986 FIFA World Cup, Parente earned two caps for the Portugal national team, both coming the following year. His first arrived on 11 November, as he played the second half of a 0–0 home draw with Switzerland for the UEFA Euro 1988 qualifiers.

Parente appeared with the under-20s at the 1979 FIFA World Youth Championship in Japan, his output for the quarter-finalists consisting of 50 minutes against Canada in the group stage (3–1 loss).
