= Sergio Escudero (footballer, born 1964) =

Argentine footballer

Sergio Escudero セルヒオ・エスクデロ
Personal information
- Full name: Sergio Ariel Escudero
- Date of birth: February 10, 1964 (age 62)
- Place of birth: Buenos Aires, Argentina
- Height: 1.70 m (5 ft 7 in)
- Position: Midfielder

Senior career*
Years	Team	Apps	(Gls)
- Vélez Sarsfield
1984–1986	Chacarita Juniors		
1987–1988	Granada		
1990–1991	Atlanta		
1992	Urawa Reds	0	(0)
- * Club domestic league appearances and goals

Sergio Escudero (エスクデロ・セルヒオ, Escudero Sergio; born February 10, 1964) is a former Argentine football player. His brother Osvaldo Escudero and son Sergio Escudero are also footballers.

== Playing career ==
Escudero has played for Vélez Sarsfield, Chacarita Juniors, Granada, and Atlanta. Sergio also played for a short time with Urawa Reds in Japan in 1992, where he played with his brother Osvaldo Escudero. However he could not play in the match in top team, he retired end of 1992 season.

== Personal life ==
His son, also named Sergio Escudero, is also a footballer, following his father footsteps playing for Urawa Reds, and currently plays for Tochigi SC. Escudero junior is also a former Japan U-23 national team player. In June 2007, Escudero acquired Japanese citizenship with his son.

His nephew Damián Escudero, son of Osvaldo, is also a footballer.

== Club statistics ==
Club performance			League		Cup		League Cup		Total	
Season	Club	League	Apps	Goals	Apps	Goals	Apps	Goals	Apps	Goals
Japan			League		Emperor's Cup		J.League Cup		Total	
1992	Urawa Reds	J1 League	-		0	0	0	0	0	0
Total			0	0	0	0	0	0	0	0
