= Kobe Central Football Stadium =

Multi-use stadium in Kobe, Japan

- 神戸市立中央球技場
- Kōbe Shiritsu Chūō Kyūgijō
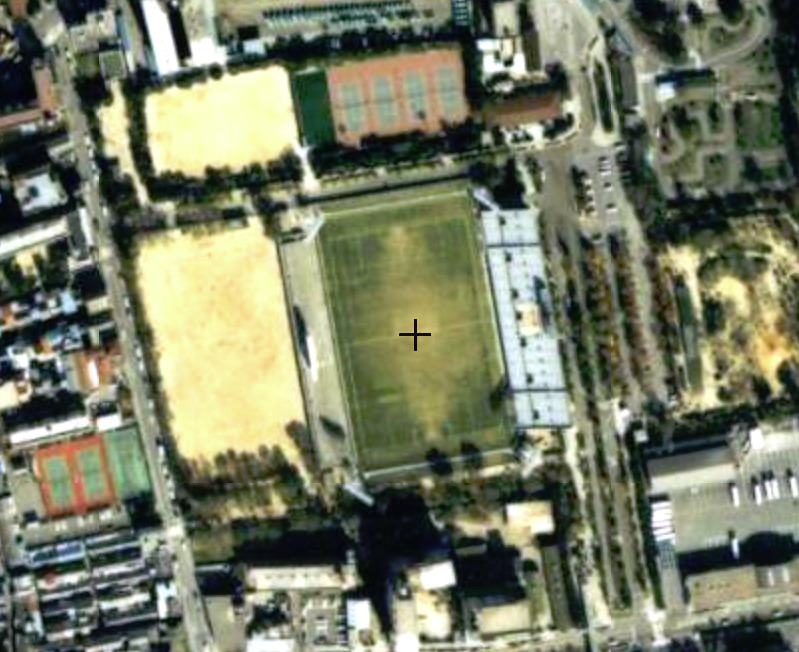
- Interactive map of Kobe Central Football Stadium
- Location: Hyōgo-ku, Kobe Japan
- Coordinates: 34°39′24.28″N 135°10′8.28″E
- Owner: Kobe City Government
- Capacity: 13,000

Construction
- Opened: 1970
- Closed: 1998
- Demolished: 1999

Tenant
- Vissel Kobe (1995–1998)

Kobe Central Football Stadium (神戸市立中央球技場, Kōbe Shiritsu Chūō Kyūgijō) was a multi-use stadium in Kobe, Japan. Opened in 1970 and with a capacity of 13,000 spectators, it was built on the site of the former Kobe Keirin Stadium and was the first stadium in Japan that was custom-built with a rectangular field for ball sports such as rugby and soccer and with lighting for night matches. It was one of the venues of the 1979 FIFA World Youth Championship and was a home stadium of Vissel Kobe. It was demolished and replaced by Misaki Park Stadium, which commenced construction in 1999 and was completed in 2001 in order to host the 2002 FIFA World Cup.
