= Arseni Comas =

Spanish footballer

Personal information
- Full name: Arseni Comas Julià
- Date of birth: 28 June 1961 (age 65)
- Place of birth: Sant Gregori, Spain
- Height: 1.74 m (5 ft 9 in)
- Position: Defender

Youth career
- 1977–1978: Girona

Senior career*
Years	Team	Apps	(Gls)
1978	Girona		
1978–1985	Barcelona Atlètic	106	(5)
1980–1981	→ Recreativo Huelva (loan)	24	(1)
1981–1982	→ Alcalá (loan)		
1982–1983	→ Granada (loan)		
1985–1989	Logroñés	130	(4)
1989–1993	Figueres	169	(3)
Total		429	(13)

International career
1977–1979	Spain U18	17	(0)
1979	Spain U19	2	(0)
1979	Spain U20	4	(0)
- * Club domestic league appearances and goals

Arseni Comas Julià (born 28 June 1961 in Sant Gregori, Girona, Catalonia) is a Spanish retired footballer who played as a defender with a number of different clubs, mostly at the second level of Spanish football. He also represented Spain at youth level, being a member of the Spanish team at the 1979 World Youth Championship.
