= Armando Romero (footballer) =

Mexican footballer (1960–2020)

Personal information
- Full name: Armando Romero Manríquez
- Date of birth: 27 October 1960
- Place of birth: Mexico City, Mexico
- Date of death: 24 December 2020 (aged 60)
- Height: 1.72 m (5 ft 8 in)
- Position: Midfielder

Senior career*
Years	Team	Apps	(Gls)
1977–1978	Veracruz	17	(0)
1980–1990	Cruz Azul	261	(31)
1990–1992	Toluca	55	(7)
1992–1993	Cobras		
1993–1994	Correcaminos UAT	31	(1)
1994–1995	Marte		
1995–1996	Zacatepec		

International career
- Mexico U20
1984–1987	Mexico	5	(0)
- * Club domestic league appearances and goals

Armando Romero Manríquez (27 October 1960 – 24 December 2020) was a Mexican professional footballer who played as a midfielder.

== Career ==
Born in Mexico City, played for Veracruz, Cruz Azul, Toluca, Cobras, Correcaminos UAT, Marte and Zacatepec. He captained Cruz Azul.

He played for Mexico at under-20 level, representing them at the 1979 FIFA World Youth Championship, and later earned 5 caps for the senior team.

== Later life and death ==
He died of COVID-19 complications at age 60, during the COVID-19 pandemic in Mexico.
