= Krzysztof Frankowski =

Polish footballer

Personal information
- Full name: Krzysztof Jan Frankowski
- Date of birth: 24 August 1959 (age 67)
- Place of birth: Kędzierzyn, Poland
- Height: 1.73 m (5 ft 8 in)
- Position: Defender

Senior career*
Years	Team	Apps	(Gls)
1977–1978	Chemik Kędzierzyn-Koźle		
1979–1983	Stal Mielec	81	(4)
1983–1987	Nantes	65	(0)
1987–1988	Le Havre	25	(0)

International career
- Poland U20
1981	Poland	4	(0)
- * Club domestic league appearances and goals

Krzysztof Frankowski (born 24 August 1959) is a Polish former professional footballer who played as a defender.

He made four appearances for the Poland national team in 1981.

== Sources ==
- Barreaud, Marc (1998). Dictionnaire des footballeurs étrangers du championnat professionnel français (1932-1997). L'Harmattan, Paris. ISBN 2-7384-6608-7.
- Krzysztof Frankowski at WorldFootball.net
