= Serhiy Krakovskyi =

Ukrainian footballer and coach (born 1960)

Serhiy Krakovskyi Сергій Краковський
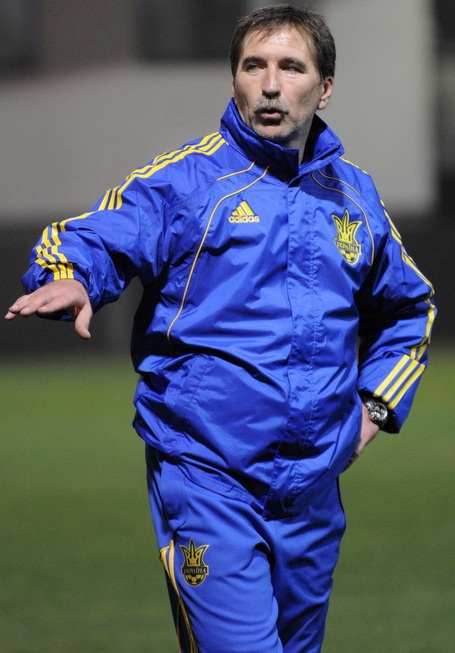

Personal information
- Full name: Serhiy Viktorovych Krakovskyi
- Date of birth: 11 August 1960 (age 66)
- Place of birth: Mykolaiv, Ukrainian SSR, Soviet Union
- Height: 1.84 m (6 ft 0 in)
- Position: Goalkeeper

Team information
- Current team: Ukraine U17 (goalkeeping coach)

Senior career*
Years	Team	Apps	(Gls)
1976–1977	Sudnobudivnyk Mykolaiv		
1978–1980	Dynamo Kyiv	1	(0)
1980–1991	Dnipro Dnipropetrovsk	210	(0)
1991–1992	Hapoel Tzafririm Holon		
1992–1994	Hapoel Hadera		
1994	Khimik Zhytomyr		

Managerial career
- 1995–1996: Metalurh Zaporizhzhia (goalkeeping coach)
- 1998: Dnipro Dnipropetrovsk (goalkeeping coach)
- 1998–1999: Kryvbas Kryvyi Rih (goalkeeping coach)
- 1999: Zirka Kirovohrad (goalkeeping coach)
- 1999: Uralan Elista (goalkeeping coach)
- 2000–2005: Arsenal Kyiv (goalkeeping coach)
- 2004: Arsenal Kyiv (caretaker)
- 2005: Khimki (goalkeeping coach)
- 2006–2007: Kuban Krasnodar (goalkeeping coach)
- 2007–2009: Dynamo Kyiv (goalkeeping coach)
- 2010–2011: Ukraine (goalkeeping coach)
- 2011: Rostov (goalkeeping coach)
- 2011–2012: Astana (goalkeeping coach)
- 2012: Metalurh Zaporizhzhia (goalkeeping coach)
- 2012–2013: Kryvbas Kryvyi Rih (goalkeeping coach)
- 2013–2015: Metalurh Zaporizhzhia (goalkeeping coach)
- 2017–2019: Sumy (goalkeeping coach)
- 2017–: Ukraine U17 (goalkeeping coach)
Medal record
Men's football
Representing Soviet Union
FIFA U-20 World Cup
Runner-up	1979 Japan
- * Club domestic league appearances and goals

Serhiy Viktorovych Krakovskyi (Ukrainian: Сергій Вікторович Краковський) is a Soviet and Ukrainian former football goalkeeper and current Ukraine national under-17 football team goalkeeping coach.

== Career ==
During his club career he played for FC Dnipro Dnipropetrovsk. He was in the USSR national football team for the 1986 FIFA World Cup, but he did not win any caps for the Soviet Union.

In 2007, he served as the goalkeeping coach of FC Dynamo Kyiv.
