= Luis Miguel Gail =

Spanish footballer and manager

Personal information
- Full name: Luis Miguel Gail Martín
- Date of birth: 23 February 1961 (age 65)
- Place of birth: Valladolid, Spain
- Height: 1.85 m (6 ft 1 in)
- Position: Centre back

Youth career
- Zorrilla
- 1976–1977: Valladolid

Senior career*
Years	Team	Apps	(Gls)
1977	Valladolid B		
1977–1986	Valladolid	241	(35)
1986–1991	Betis	109	(11)
Total		350	(46)

International career
1978–1979	Spain U18	7	(3)
1979	Spain U19	2	(0)
1979	Spain U20	3	(1)

Managerial career
- 1999: Sabadell
- 2000–2001: Xerez
- 2001: Zamora
- 2006–2007: Laguna
- 2010: Castile and León (U18)
- * Club domestic league appearances and goals

Luis Miguel Gail Martín (23 February 1961) is a Spanish former football central defender and manager.

He amassed La Liga totals of 266 matches and 29 goals over one full decade, representing Valladolid and Betis.

== Club career ==
Gail was born in Valladolid, Castile and León. After emerging through their youth ranks, he made his senior debut for local club Real Valladolid at only 16. He first appeared in La Liga in the 1980–81 campaign, competing with the side in that level in six straight seasons, scoring 51 competitive goals and helping to the conquest of the (short-lived) Copa de la Liga in his final year, against Atlético Madrid.

In summer 1986, Gail joined Real Betis also in the top division. He totalled nine goals in the league in his first two years but also suffered relegation to Segunda División twice, eventually retiring from professional football at only 30.

Gail took up coaching subsequently, but never in higher than Segunda División B.

== Honours ==
Valladolid

- Copa de la Liga: 1984
