= Kazimierz Buda =

Polish footballer (born 1960)

Personal information
- Date of birth: 3 May 1960 (age 66)
- Place of birth: Mielec, Poland
- Height: 1.78 m (5 ft 10 in)
- Position: Defender

Senior career*
Years	Team	Apps	(Gls)
1977–1983	Stal Mielec	143	(25)
1983–1989	Legia Warsaw	122	(14)
1989–1990	Francs Borains		
1990–1994	Vaasan Palloseura		
1994–1995	Pogoń Grodzisk Mazowiecki		
1995–1996	Vaasan Palloseura	32	(0)
1996	Euran Pallo	10	(2)
1997–2000	Dolcan Ząbki		
2001	GKP Targówek		

International career
- Poland U18
1981–1984	Poland	6	(0)

Managerial career
- 2003–2004: Hutnik Warsaw
- Mazur Radzymin
- Drukarz Warsaw
Medal record
Men's football
Representing Poland
UEFA European Under-18 Championship
Third place	1978 Poland
- * Club domestic league appearances and goals

Kazimierz Buda (born 3 May 1960) is a Polish former professional footballer who played as a defender.

== Honours ==
Legia Warsaw

- Polish Cup: 1988–89

Poland U18

- UEFA European Under-18 Championship third place: 1978
