= Anatoliy Radenko =

Ukrainian footballer (born 1959)

Personal information
- Full name: Anatoli Hryhorovych Radenko
- Date of birth: 3 August 1959 (age 67)
- Place of birth: Stalino, Soviet Union (now Donetsk, Ukraine)
- Height: 1.80 m (5 ft 11 in)
- Position: Midfielder

Senior career*
Years	Team	Apps	(Gls)
1977–1980	Shakhtar Donetsk	24	(0)
1981–1982	Torpedo Moscow	49	(2)
1983–1987	Shakhtar Donetsk	108	(8)
1987	Nistru Chişinău	23	(5)
1988	Zorya Voroshilovhrad	2	(0)
1988–1989	Volyn Lutsk	74	(11)
1990	Shakhtar Donetsk	2	(0)
1991	TP-47	20	(3)
1992	Shakhtar-2 Donetsk	21	(3)
1993	Pivdenstal Yenakiieve	15	(0)

Managerial career
- 1992: Shakhtar-2 Donetsk (assistant)
- 1996–1997: Volyn Lutsk
- 1997–1998: Sokol Saratov
- 1998–1999: Polihraftekhnika Oleksandriya
- 2002: Mashynobudivnyk Druzhkivka
- 2002–2003: Podillya Khmelnytskyi
- 2003–2004: Nyva Vinnytsia
- 2008: Metalurh Donetsk (assistant)
Medal record
Men's football
Representing Soviet Union
FIFA U-20 World Cup
Runner-up	1979 Japan
UEFA European Under-21 Championship
Winner	1980 Europe
- * Club domestic league appearances and goals

Anatoli Hryhorovych Radenko (Ukrainian: Анатолій Григорович Раденко; Russian: Анатолий Григорьевич Раденко; born 3 August 1959) is a Ukrainian former professional football coach and player. In the 2000s, he retired from football and became a priest.

== Honours ==
- Soviet Top League runner-up: 1979
- Soviet Cup finalist: 1982
