= Ernesto Vargas =

Uruguayan footballer (born 1961)

Personal information
- Full name: Ernesto Vargas Rodríguez
- Date of birth: 1 May 1961 (age 65)
- Place of birth: Montevideo, Uruguay
- Height: 1.69 m (5 ft 7 in)
- Position: Forward

Senior career*
Years	Team	Apps	(Gls)
1979–1986	Peñarol	157	(41)
1987–1988	Nacional	86	(20)
1989	Real Oviedo		
1990	L.D.U. Quito		
1991	Nacional		
- Cerrito
- Universitario

International career
1979–1981	Uruguay	12	(1)
Medal record
Men's football
Representing Uruguay
Mundialito
Winner	1980 Uruguay
- * Club domestic league appearances and goals

Ernesto Vargas Rodríguez (born May 1, 1961) is a Uruguayan former footballer.

== Career ==
Vargas started in 1979 playing for Peñarol until 1986. En 1987 he signed for Nacional, staying with them until 1988. That year he went to Spain, joining the Real Oviedo. In 1990, he joined LDU Quito of Ecuador. In 1990, he returned to Uruguay's Nacional, and in 1991 to Peru where he played for Universitario, where he finally retired.

== Clubs ==
ClUbBiE	Country	Year
Peñarol	Uruguay	1979–1986
Nacional	Uruguay	1987–1988
Real Oviedo	Spain	1988–1989
LDU Quito	Ecuador	1990
Nacional	Uruguay	1990
Universitario	Peru	1991
