= Yaroslav Dumanskyi =

Soviet footballer (1959–2021)

Personal information
- Full name: Yaroslav Myroslavovych Dumanskyi
- Date of birth: 4 August 1959
- Place of birth: Stanislav, Ukrainian SSR
- Date of death: 22 June 2021 (aged 61)
- Place of death: Ivano-Frankivsk, Ukraine
- Height: 1.76 m (5 ft 9 in)
- Position: Midfielder

Senior career*
Years	Team	Apps	(Gls)
1976	Spartak Ivano-Frankivsk	1	(0)
1977–1981	Karpaty Lviv	102	(13)
1981–1984	Dynamo Kyiv	60	(4)
1985	Dynamo Moscow	1	(0)
1986	Metalist Kharkiv	26	(0)
1988–1990	Prykarpattya Ivano-Frankivsk	99	(24)
Total		289	(41)

Managerial career
- 1992–1993: FC Khutrovyk Tysmenytsia
Medal record
Men's football
Representing Soviet Union
FIFA U-20 World Cup
Runner-up	1979 Japan
UEFA European Under-18 Championship
Winner	1978 Poland
UEFA European U-18 Championships
Bronze medal – third place	1977 Belgium
UEFA European Under-21 Championship
Winner	1980 Europe
- * Club domestic league appearances and goals

Yaroslav Myroslavovich Dumanskyi (Ukrainian: Ярослав Мирославович Думанський; 4 August 1959 – 22 June 2021) was a Soviet professional footballer who played as a midfielder. He was the son of another Soviet player and coach, Myroslav Dumanskyi.

Following his retirement, Dumanskyi coached a few teams from the home region.
