= Mykhaylo Olefirenko =

Ukrainian football player

Personal information
- Full name: Mykhaylo Volodymyrovych Olefirenko
- Date of birth: 6 June 1960 (age 66)
- Place of birth: Mykolaiv, Ukrainian SSR
- Height: 1.76 m (5 ft 9 1/2 in)
- Positions: Defender; midfielder

Senior career*
Years	Team	Apps	(Gls)
1977–1986	FC Dynamo Kyiv	77	(3)
1986–1988	FC Shakhtar Donetsk	56	(0)
1989	FC Guria Lanchkhuti	42	(0)
1990	FC Dynamo Bila Tserkva	36	(7)
1991–1992	1. FC Tatran Prešov	41	(1)
1992–1993	ASK Marz (Austria)		
1993–1996	Hapoel Hadera F.C.		
1996	FC Bukovyna Chernivtsi	17	(0)
1997	FC Veres Rivne	17	(1)

Managerial career
- 1997–1999: FC Metalurh Donetsk (assistant)
- 1999–2001: FC Borysfen Boryspil (assistant)
- 2001–2002: FC Tobol
- 2002–2004: FC Krystal Kherson
Medal record
Men's football
Representing Soviet Union
FIFA U-20 World Cup
Runner-up	1979 Japan
UEFA European Under-18 Championship
Winner	1978 Poland
- * Club domestic league appearances and goals

Mykhaylo Volodymyrovych Olefirenko (Ukrainian: Михайло Володимирович Олефіренко; born 6 June 1960 in Mykolaiv) is a retired Ukrainian professional football coach and a former player.

Olefirenko began his professional playing career with FC Dynamo Kyiv and he won three Soviet Top League and one Soviet Cup titles with the club.

== Honours ==
- Soviet Top League champion: 1980, 1985, 1986.
- Soviet Top League runner-up: 1982.
- Soviet Cup winner: 1982.
