= Dmitri Barannik =

Russian footballer and coach

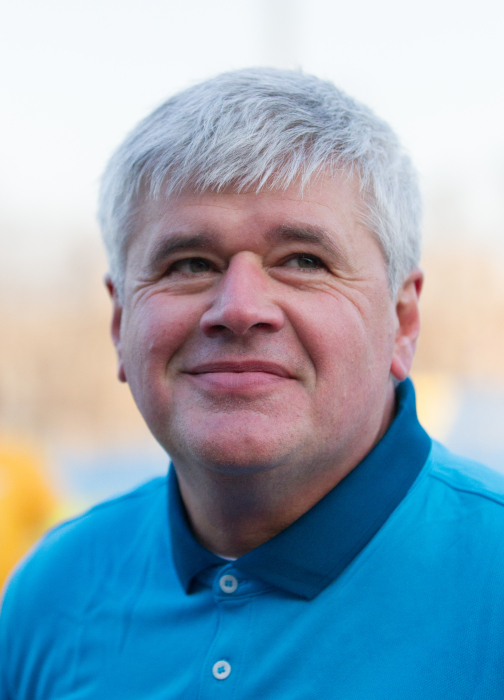
- Dmitri Barannik in 2014

Personal information
- Full name: Dmitri Petrovich Barannik
- Date of birth: November 9, 1963 (age 62)
- Place of birth: Leningrad, Russian SFSR
- Height: 1.82 m (5 ft 11 1/2 in)
- Position: Midfielder

Senior career*
Years	Team	Apps	(Gls)
1981–1990	FC Zenit Leningrad	190	(8)
1991–1994	FK Mjølner		
1995–1997	Strømsgodset IF	67	(4)
1998	FC Lyn Oslo		

Managerial career
- 1994: FK Mjølner (playing head coach)
- 2000–2001: L/F Hønefoss (assistant)
- 2001: L/F Hønefoss (caretaker)
- 2001–2003: Stabæk (junior coach)
- 2006: Lyn (junior coach)
- 2007: Asker
- 2007–2009: Lokomotiv Moskva (administrative)
- * Club domestic league appearances and goals

Dmitri Petrovich Barannik (Russian: Дмитрий Петрович Баранник; born November 9, 1963, in Leningrad, now St. Petersburg) is a retired Russian professional footballer.

He has coached several clubs in Norway, and has worked at the Norwegian College of Elite Sport.

== Honours ==
- Soviet Top League champion: 1984.
