= Nikolai Vorobyov (footballer) =

Russian footballer and coach

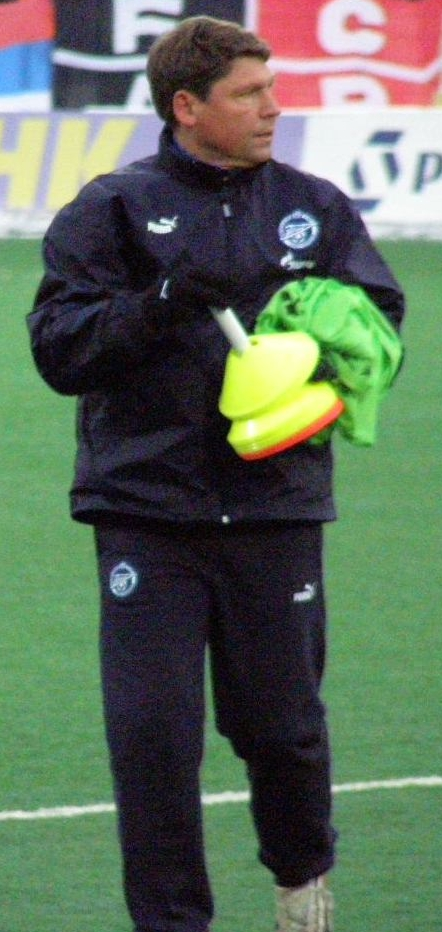

Personal information
- Full name: Nikolai Vasilyevich Vorobyov
- Date of birth: 21 May 1960 (age 66)
- Place of birth: Leningrad, now St. Petersburg, Russian SFSR
- Height: 1.76 m (5 ft 9 1/2 in)
- Position: Defender

Senior career*
Years	Team	Apps	(Gls)
1979–1983	FC Dynamo Leningrad	105	(4)
1984–1990	FC Zenit Leningrad	112	(1)

Managerial career
- 1994–1997: FC Zenit-2 St. Petersburg
- 1998–1999: FC Zenit St. Petersburg (assistant)
- 2000: FC Zenit St. Petersburg (scout)
- 2001–2002: FC Tyumen
- 2003: FC Zenit-2 St. Petersburg
- 2004–2005: FC Zenit St. Petersburg (reserves)
- 2005–2011: FC Zenit St. Petersburg (assistant)
- * Club domestic league appearances and goals

Nikolai Vasilyevich Vorobyov (Russian: Николай Васильевич Воробьёв; born 21 May 1960 in Leningrad now St. Petersburg) is a Russian professional football coach and a former player.

He worked as an assistant coach with FC Zenit St. Petersburg.

== Honours ==
- Soviet Top League champion: 1984.
- USSR Federation Cup finalist: 1986.

== European club competitions ==
With FC Zenit St. Petersburg.

- UEFA Cup 1987–88: 2 games.
- UEFA Cup 1989–90: 4 games.
