= Damián Escudero =

Argentine footballer

Personal information
- Full name: Damián Ariel Escudero
- Date of birth: 20 April 1987 (age 39)
- Place of birth: Rosario, Argentina
- Height: 1.76 m (5 ft 9 in)
- Position: Midfielder

Youth career
- Vélez Sarsfield

Senior career*
Years	Team	Apps	(Gls)
2005–2008	Vélez Sarsfield	84	(18)
2008–2010	Villarreal	13	(1)
2008–2009	→ Valladolid (loan)	15	(0)
2010–2013	Boca Juniors	13	(0)
2011	→ Grêmio (loan)	31	(4)
2012	→ Atlético Mineiro (loan)	27	(4)
2013	→ Vitória (loan)	27	(2)
2014–2015	Vitória	37	(11)
2016	Puebla	27	(3)
2017–2018	Vasco da Gama	7	(0)
2019	Cuiabá	13	(1)

International career
2007	Argentina U20	3	(1)
2008	Argentina U23	1	(0)
- * Club domestic league appearances and goals as of 30 November 2019

Damián Ariel Escudero (born 20 April 1987) is a former Argentine professional footballer who played as a midfielder. A well-travelled professional, Escudero played for a number of clubs in Argentina, Spain, Mexico and Brazil after starting out at Vélez Sarsfield. He was a youth international for Argentina.

== Club career ==
Escudero was born in Rosario, Santa Fe. A product of Club Atlético Vélez Sarsfield's youth system, he made his first-team debut in a 0–1 away defeat against Newell's Old Boys on 4 March 2006. He found himself at the centre of a controversy at the end of the year, when the club refused to release him and Mauro Zárate for the 2007 South American U-20 Championship.

When the 2007 edition of the Copa Libertadores started, Escudero was already a dynamic part in the team's attacking movements. He helped Vélez reach the round-of-16 in the tournament, scoring four goals.

Escudero had an irregular 2007–08 season, during which his team failed to qualify for the Copa Sudamericana. However, he did net three times in the Clausura, including once against Boca Juniors.

For 2008–09, Escudero was bought by Spanish La Liga side Villarreal CF in a US$12,000,000 move. He was quickly loaned to Real Valladolid because his club's non-EU quota was already full, appearing rarely throughout the campaign due to injury.

Escudero returned to Villarreal for 2009–10, but continued to be barred by the likes of Robert Pires and Santi Cazorla. Most of his appearances were due to injury problems to the latter, and he scored against Xerez CD on 14 March 2010 (2–0 home win) after only playing six minutes in the game.

In June 2010, Escudero was sold to Boca Juniors, with Villarreal retaining 50% of the player's rights. The following year he was loaned to Grêmio Foot-Ball Porto Alegrense and performed solidly but, after the two clubs could not agree on a transfer fee for another loan, he returned to Buenos Aires.

In January 2012, Escudero returned to Brazil signing a one-year contract with Clube Atlético Mineiro, who paid Boca US$700.000. Apart from a one-year spell in the Mexican Liga MX with Puebla F.C. he continued to play in the country in the following years, with Esporte Clube Vitória, CR Vasco da Gama and Cuiabá Esporte Clube.

== International career ==
In 2007, Escudero was selected in the Argentina under-20 squad to compete in the FIFA World Cup in Canada, but hardly played due to injury. The following year, he first played for the Olympic side against Guatemala in preparation for the 2008 Summer Olympics, appearing as a left back in the 5–0 rout.

== Personal life ==
Escudero was often nicknamed Pichi, the same used by his father Osvaldo who was also a football player.

== Honours ==
=== Club ===
Atlético Mineiro

- Campeonato Mineiro: 2012

Vitória

- Campeonato Baiano: 2013

Cuiabá

- Copa Verde: 2019

=== International ===
Argentina

- FIFA U-20 World Cup: 2007
