= Haris Smajić =

Bosnian footballer

Personal information
- Date of birth: 8 March 1960 (age 66)
- Place of birth: Breza, Yugoslavia
- Position: Forward

Senior career*
Years	Team	Apps	(Gls)
1978–1983	Sarajevo	53	(8)
1983–1984	Priština	11	(0)
1984–1985	Spartak Subotica	16	(1)
1985–1988	Famos Hrasnica	71	(1)
1988–1991	Rudar Kakanj		

International career
1979	Yugoslavia U20	1	(2)
- * Club domestic league appearances and goals

Haris Smajić (born 8 March 1960) is a Bosnian retired footballer.

== Club career ==
A product of FK Sarajevo academy, Smajić played for the team between 1978 and 1983 in the Yugoslav First League, after which he played for a second level sides such as FK Priština, FK Spartak Subotica and FK Famos Hrasnica, before joining third level side FK Rudar Kakanj in 1988.

== International career ==
He played for Yugoslavia national under-20 football team at the 1979 FIFA World Youth Championship, but was never capped for Yugoslavia at full international level.
