= Arnaldo Vera =

Paraguayan footballer (born 1980)

Personal information
- Full name: Arnaldo Andrés Vera Chamorro
- Date of birth: January 22, 1980 (age 46)
- Place of birth: Zeballos Cué, Paraguay
- Height: 1.81 m (5 ft 11 in)
- Position: Defender

Senior career*
Years	Team	Apps	(Gls)
2001	Club Cerro Corá		
2002–2011	Club Libertad		
2011	Club Nacional	16	(0)
2012	LDU Loja	38	(2)
2013	CSD Macará	13	(0)
2014	Club Rubio Ñu	20	(0)
2014–2015	Club San José	27	(0)
2015–2016	Sport Boys Warnes	35	(1)
2016–2017	Club Real América		
2017	Deportivo Kala		
2018	Club Destroyers	15	(0)
2018	Club Always Ready		
- * Club domestic league appearances and goals

Arnaldo Andrés Vera Chamorro (born 22 January 1980) is a Paraguayan former footballer who played as a defender.

== Career ==
Vera started his career with Paraguayan side Club Cerro Corá. In 2002, he signed for Paraguayan side Club Libertad. He helped the club win the league. He was regarded as one of their most important players. In 2011, he signed for Paraguayan side Club Nacional. In 2012, he signed for Ecuadorian side LDU Loja. In 2013, he signed for Ecuadorian side CSD Macará. In 2014, he signed for Paraguayan side Club Rubio Ñu. After that, he signed for Bolivian side Club San José. In 2015, he signed for Bolivian side Sport Boys Warnes. In 2016, he signed for Bolivian side Club Real América. In 2017, he signed for Bolivian side Deportivo Kala. In 2018, he signed for Bolivian side Club Destroyers. After that, he signed for Bolivian side Club Always Ready.

== Style of play ==
Vera mainly operated as a defender. He was described as "tough, determined and giving everything in every game".

== Personal life ==
Vera has been nicknamed "Tenaza". He has a daughter. He is a native of Zeballos Cué, Paraguay.
