= Igor Ponomaryov =

Soviet football player (born 1960)

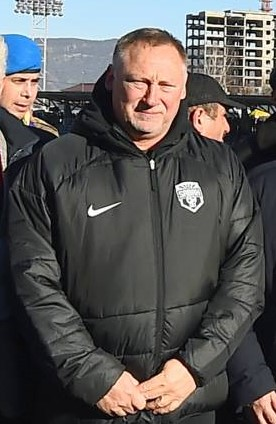

Personal information
- Full name: Igor Anatolyevich Ponomaryov
- Date of birth: 24 February 1960 (age 66)
- Place of birth: Baku, Azerbaijani SSR
- Height: 1.80 m (5 ft 11 in)
- Position: Midfielder

Team information
- Current team: Sabah (board member)

Youth career
- 1977–1978: Neftçi

Senior career*
Years	Team	Apps	(Gls)
1978–1981	Neftçi	77	(25)
1982	CSKA Moscow	34	(3)
1983–1988	Neftçi	149	(38)
1989	IFK Norrköping	17	(3)
Total		277	(69)

International career
1988	USSR (Olympic)	1	(0)
1980	USSR	1	(0)

Managerial career
- IFK Norrköping (assistant)
- Reymersholms IK (assistant)
- 2000–2001: Azerbaijan
- 2002–2003: Syrianska FC
- 2004–2005: Qarabağ
- 2006–2007: Mashuk-KMV Pyatigorsk
- 2008–2009: Khazar Lankaran
- 2019–: Sabah (board member)
- 2024: Sabah (caretaker)
Medal record
Representing the Soviet Union
Men's football
Gold medal – first place	1988 Seoul	Team
- * Club domestic league appearances and goals

Igor Anatolyevich Ponomaryov (Russian: Игорь Анатольевич Пономарёв; Azerbaijani: İqor Anatoli oğlu Ponomaryov; born 24 February 1960) is an Azerbaijani and Russian football manager and a former Soviet player. He is a board member of Sabah.

== Honours ==
- Olympic Champion: 1988
- UEFA European Under-19 Football Championship winner: 1978
- 1979 FIFA World Youth Championship runner-up: 1979
- Holds the record for most penalty kicks scored in a row without misses in the Soviet Top League (24)

== International career ==
In the 1979 FIFA World Youth Championship final He Scored a free kick to give the Soviet Union national under-20 football team the lead, but the Team eventually lost 3-1 to the Argentina national under-20 football team.

Ponomaryov played his only game for USSR on 4 December 1980 in a friendly against Argentina and Diego Maradona.

== Personal life ==
He is the father of Anatoli Ponomarev. Both hold Swedish passports.
