= Oleh Taran =

Ukrainian footballer (born 1960)

Oleh Taran Олег Таран
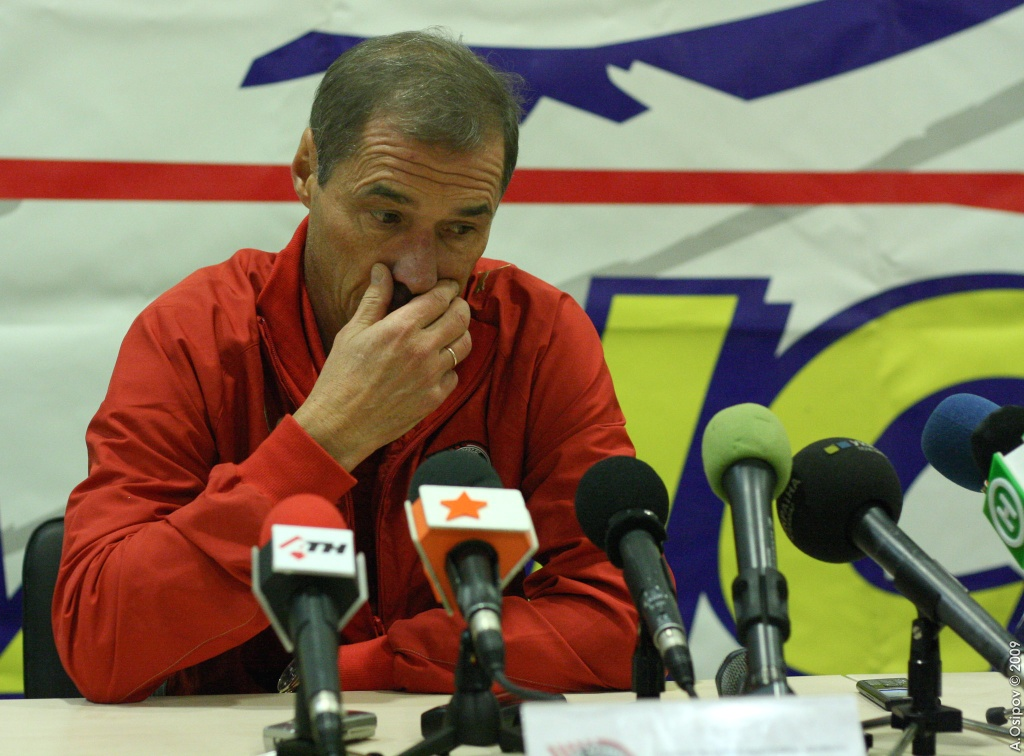

Personal information
- Full name: Oleh Anatolyevich Taran
- Date of birth: 11 January 1960 (age 66)
- Place of birth: Ordzhonikidze, Ukrainian SSR, Soviet Union
- Height: 1.79 m (5 ft 10 in)
- Position: Forward

Youth career
- 1969–1973: Ordzhonikidze soccer school
- 1973–1977: Kyiv sport school

Senior career*
Years	Team	Apps	(Gls)
1977–1980	Dynamo Kyiv	6	(0)
1980	Chornomorets Odesa	15	(0)
1981–1982	SKA Odesa	43	(20)
1982	CSKA Moscow	21	(3)
1983–1988	Dnipro Dnipropetrovsk	134	(45)
1989	Metalurh Zaporizhzhia	40	(16)
1990	Wydad Casablanca	?	(?)
1990	Metalurh Zaporizhzhia	15	(4)
1990–1991	Tzafririm Holon	?	(?)
1991–1992	Metalurh Zaporizhzhia	27	(4)
1992	Markaryds IF	8	(0)
1992–1993	Metalurh Zaporizhzhia	1	(0)
1992–1993	Enerhiya Nova Kakhovka	?	(1)
1992–1994	TSV Eltingen	?	(?)
1994–1995	Dnipro Dnipropetrovsk	7	(1)
1998	Dustlik Tashkent	?	(?)

International career
1977–1978	Soviet Union (U-18)		
1979	Soviet Union (U-20)		

Managerial career
- 1997–2001: Kryvbas Kryvyi Rih
- 2001–2002: Metalurh Zaporizhzhia
- 2003: Slovan Bratislava
- 2007–2010: Kryvbas Kryvyi Rih
- 2012–2013: Kryvbas Kryvyi Rih
- 2013–2014: Metalurh Zaporizhzhia
- 2018–2019: Metalurh Zaporizhzhia
- 2020: Peremoha Dnipro (sporting director)
Medal record
Men's football
Representing Soviet Union
FIFA U-20 World Cup
Runner-up	1979 Japan
UEFA European Under-18 Championship
Winner	1978 Poland
UEFA European U-18 Championships
Bronze medal – third place	1977 Belgium
- * Club domestic league appearances and goals

Oleh Anatolyevich Taran (Ukrainian: Олег Анатолійович Таран, romanized: Oleh Anatoliiovych Taran; born 11 January 1960) is a Ukrainian football coach and former player. He was a prolific forward who possessed a powerful shot and was capable of dribbling quickly and precisely. In 1983, he was named the Ukrainian Footballer of the Year.

== Honours ==
=== Player ===
Dnipro Dnipropetrovsk

- Soviet Top League: 1983, 1988; runner-up silver 1987; runner-up bronze 1984, 1985

'Wydad Casablanca

- Moroccan League: 1990

Individual

- Ukrainian Footballer of the Year: 1983

=== Coach ===
Kryvbas Kryvyi Rih

- Ukrainian Premier League bronze: 1998–99, 1999–2000
- Ukrainian Cup runner-up: 1999–2000
