= Yuri Lykov =

Russian footballer and coach

Personal information
- Full name: Yuri Ivanovich Lykov
- Date of birth: 27 April 1961 (age 65)
- Height: 1.76 m (5 ft 9 1/2 in)
- Position: Defender

Senior career*
Years	Team	Apps	(Gls)
1979–1987	FC SKA Rostov-on-Don	63	(0)

Managerial career
- 1997: FC Rostselmash Rostov-on-Don (assistant)
- 1999–2002: FC Rostselmash Rostov-on-Don (assistant)
- 2003: FC Rostov (reserves)
- 2004–2005: FC Rostov (reserves assistant)
- 2005–2007: FC Rostov (assistant)
- 2009: FC Vityaz Podolsk (assistant)
- 2019: FC Chayka Peschanokopskoye (caretaker)
- * Club domestic league appearances and goals

Yuri Ivanovich Lykov (Russian: Юрий Иванович Лыков; born 27 April 1961) is a Russian professional football coach and a former player.
