= Ricardo Márquez (Mexican footballer) =

Mexican footballer (born 1956)

Personal information
- Full name: Ricardo Márquez Ramos
- Date of birth: 26 October 1956 (age 70)
- Place of birth: Guadalajara, Jalisco, Mexico
- Height: 1.77 m (5 ft 10 in)
- Position: Forward

Senior career*
| Years | Team | Apps | (Gls) |
| 1974–1977 | Jalisco | | |
| 1977–1978 | Zacatepec | | |
| 1978–1979 | Jalisco | | |
| 1979–1980 | León | | |
| 1980 | Jalisco | | |
| 1981 | Unión de Curtidores | | |
| 1981–1984 | Atlas | | |
| 1984–1985 | Tigres UANL | | |
| 1985–1986 | Atlético Morelia | | |
| 1986–1987 | Irapuato | | |

International career
| 1983 | Mexico | 3 | (1) |
- * Club domestic league appearances and goals

Ricardo Márquez Ramos (born 26 October 1956) is a Mexican retired footballer. Nicknamed "El Diablo", he played as a forward for Jalisco and Atlas throughout the 1970s and the 1980s. He also represented Mexico internationally in 1983.

== Club career ==
Márquez began his career for Jalisco for their 1974–75 season. He remained in the club for an additional two seasons before transferring to Zacatepec. There, he greatly contributed to the club's return to the top-flight of Mexican football through scoring the winning goal against Irapuato during the first matchday of the promotional playoffs, later scoring two further goals against them in the final, being part of the winning squad for the 1977–78 Mexican Segunda División season.

Following a few brief tenures with other clubs including various returns to Jalisco, he then switched to Atlas as he was later made part of the club's offensive formation alongside fellow recent signing Guillermo Padrón for the 1981–82 season. He made his debut in a 0–2 defeat against Monterrey on 19 September 1981. Throughout his campaign with the Zorros, he earned his nickname of "Diablo" due to his likelihood of scoring a goal, continuing a tradition of Mexican football.

== International career ==
Márquez was first called up by manager Bora Milutinović to represent Mexico in a friendly against Costa Rica on 15 March 1983 that ended in a 0–1 victory for the Tricolor as a part of a project to select players for the upcoming 1986 FIFA World Cup. His second appearance in another friendly against Costa Rica saw Márquez score the only goal in a 1–0 victory on 22 March. However, his international career came to an abrupt end as his third and final appearance occurred on 5 April in a 2–0 victory over Guatemala.

== Later life ==
Alongside his teammate Roberto Masciarelli, he trained Pável Pardo into also playing for Atlas througbout the 1990s.
