= Osvaldo Escudero =

Argentine footballer and manager

Personal information
- Full name: Osvaldo Salvador Escudero
- Date of birth: October 15, 1960 (age 66)
- Place of birth: Paso de los Libres, Argentina
- Height: 1.60 m (5 ft 3 in)
- Position: Forward

Senior career*
Years	Team	Apps	(Gls)
1978–1979	Chacarita	37	(6)
1979	Vélez Sársfield	9	(0)
1980	Chacarita		
1981	Boca Juniors	41	(5)
1982–1985	Unión	137	(20)
1986	Independiente	26	(5)
1986–1989	Rosario Central	116	(16)
1989–1990	Racing Club	52	(6)
1991	Barcelona		
1991–1992	Urawa Reds	30	(4)
1993	Platense		
1993–1994	For Ever		

International career
1979	Argentina U-20	5	(1)

Managerial career
- 2012: Santa Tecla FC
- 2014–2016: Santa Tecla FC
- 2016–2017: CD FAS
- 2017–2018: CD Águila
- 2020: Santa Tecla FC
- 2022-2023: Atletico Marte
- * Club domestic league appearances and goals

Osvaldo Salvador Escudero (born October 15, 1960, in Paso de los Libres, Corrientes) is a former Argentine professional footballer. He was part of the Argentina Under-20 team that won the 1979 FIFA World Youth Championship in Japan.

Escudero started his career with Chacarita Juniors in 1978, he also played for Boca Juniors where he won the Metropolitano 1981 and at Rosario Central where he won the 1986–1987 championship. He played abroad for Barcelona SC (Ecuador) and Mitsubishi Motors (Japan).

His other clubs include Vélez Sársfield, Unión de Santa Fe, Independiente, Racing Club, Platense and Chaco For Ever.

His younger brother Sergio Escudero is also football player.

== Biography ==
Escudero began his career in 1978, debuting with Chacarita Juniors in his native Argentina.

He was then summoned to the FIFA U-20 World Cup with the Argentina national under-20 football team who won the youth world championship 1979 in Japan.

"We were very young (with Maradona), where we hardly had the illusion of success at first. Diego always had very good appreciation for me, we were very good friends. On the court he always interpreted the game well, along with Ramon Diaz (scorer of the tournament). We all three got along well, "said Escudero, recalling the exploits with the Argentina youth.

After a brief time with Vélez and a return to Chacarita Juniors, Escudero moved to the Boca Juniors team, which would win the Primera Division Championship in 1981.

Subsequently, their experiences Independiente de Avellaneda, Rosario Central and Racing Club, helped to "Pichi" out of Argentina to go on loan in 1991 to Barcelona from Ecuador, where he was champion after six months in which he participated.

"I never thought I would be a coach. Never. I came to El Salvador and Jaime is a close friend of Guillermo Figueroa (official of) Santa Tecla and he was joking about whether I would lead Santa Tecla. Jokingly, he said yes too. I had no vocation to be a coach, because I did not like being a coach. Communicating always cost me. I was always very quiet and a coach must talk a lot, convey their ideas," Escudero confessed, saying that something that helped him develop his talent as a strategist was the fact of directing veteran teams in Argentina.

In the same way, Escudero admits that despite fogueando go in the league veterans adjust to the technical direction of Santa Tecla was not easy. Today makes a contrast of the first tournament (Apertura 2012) that came with the tournament that has now led. Expresses feel more confident and solvency to convey ideas to his players in a better way.

The first stage ended with Santa Tecla, according to his opinion, not by the fact of making a bad role, but because "he was not comfortable with my assistant Guillermo Rivera. It was not faithful to me and the board gave him the right (trust) to it and if so is because they did not trust me", said Escudero.

== Coaching career Club ==
From June 2012, Escudero was the new coach of the Santa Tecla of First Division of El Salvador.

October 31, 2012, left the Santa Tecla by problems with Guillermo Rivera (former Salvadoran selected), but returned for the title of the Clausura 2015 tournament champion.

== Clubs ==
Club	Country	Year
Chacarita Jr.	Argentina	1978–1979
Vélez Sarsfield	Argentina	1979–1980
Chacarita Jr.	Argentina	1980
Boca Juniors	Argentina	1981
Santa Fe	Argentina	1982–1985
Independiente	Argentina	1986
Rosario Central	Argentina	1986–1989
Racing Club	Argentina	1989–1990
Barcelona	Ecuador	1991
Red Diamonds	Japan	1991–1992
Platense	Argentina	1993
For Ever	Argentina	1993–1994

== Footballer honours ==
achievements	Club	season
Argentine Primera División	Boca Juniors	1981
Argentine Primera División	Rosario Central	1987
Serie A	Barcelona	1991

== Managerial stats ==
Team	Nat	From	To	Record				
Team	Nat	From	To	G	W	D	L	%
Aguila	El Salvador	2017	2018	29	10	10	9	45
Santa Tecla	El Salvador	2020	2020	11	2	5	4	33.33
Atletico Marte	El Salvador	June 21, 2022	March 4, 2023	20	3	9	8	30

== Clubs ==
Club	Country	Year
Santa Tecla	El Salvador	2015
Santa Tecla	El Salvador	2014–2016

== Honours football coach ==
achievements	Club	season
Salvadoran Primera División	Santa Tecla	2015

== International football player selection ==
Club	Year
Argentina national under-20 football team	1979

== Footballer honours ==
achievements	Club	season
FIFA U-20 World Cup	Argentina national under-20 football team	1979
