= Sergei Stukashov =

Russian footballer and manager

Personal information
- Full name: Sergei Viktorovich Stukashov
- Date of birth: 12 November 1959 (age 66)
- Place of birth: Aktas, Kazakh SSR, Soviet Union
- Height: 1.70 m (5 ft 7 in)
- Position: Striker

Youth career
- FC Shakhter Karagandy

Senior career*
Years	Team	Apps	(Gls)
1976	FC Shakhter Karagandy	6	(1)
1977–1984	FC Kairat	185	(52)
1985–1988	FC Dynamo Moscow	77	(20)

International career
1984–1985	USSR	6	(2)

Managerial career
- 1992–1998: FC Dynamo Moscow (youth teams)
- 2002: FC Spartak Shchyolkovo
- 2003–2006: FC Rubin Kazan (reserves)
- 2006–2007: FC Dynamo Moscow (youth teams)
- 2011: FC Kairat (assistant)
- * Club domestic league appearances and goals

Sergei Viktorovich Stukashov (Russian: Сергей Викторович Стукашов; born 12 November 1959) is a Russian football manager and a former player.

== Honours ==
- Soviet Top League runner-up: 1986.
- UEFA European Under-19 Football Championship winner: 1978.
- 1979 FIFA World Youth Championship runner-up.

== International career ==
Stukashov made his debut for USSR on 28 March 1984 in a friendly against West Germany. He scored two goals in a 1985 friendly against China.
