= Ashot Khachatryan =

Armenian-Soviet footballer

Personal information
- Full name: Ashot Sureni Khachatryan
- Date of birth: 3 August 1959 (age 67)
- Place of birth: Soviet Union
- Height: 1.77 m (5 ft 9 1/2 in)
- Position: Defender

Senior career*
Years	Team	Apps	(Gls)
1976–1991	FC Ararat Yerevan	366	(21)
1991–1996	ASA Issy		

International career
1992–1995	Armenia	4	(0)

Managerial career
- 1996–1997: Van Yerevan
- 1997: FC Yerevan (assistant)
- 1997–1998: FC Yerevan
- 1999–2000: Tsement Ararat
- * Club domestic league appearances and goals

Ashot Sureni Khachatryan (Armenian: Աշոտ Սուրենի Խաչատրյան; born 3 August 1959) is a retired football defender from Armenia. He obtained a total number of five caps for the national team. Khachatryan made his debut on 14 October 1992 against Moldova (0–0).
