= 1978 UEFA European Under-18 Championship =

Tournament details
- Host country: Poland
- Dates: 5–14 May
- Teams: 16

Final positions
- Champions: Soviet Union (4th title)
- Runners-up: Yugoslavia
- Third place: Poland
- Fourth place: Scotland

The UEFA European Under-18 Championship 1978 Final Tournament was held in Poland. It also served as the European qualification for the 1979 FIFA World Youth Championship.

== Qualification ==
=== Group 1 ===
Teams	Pld	W	D	L	GF	GA	GD	Pts
Hungary	4	2	1	1	6	2	+4	5
Czechoslovakia	4	2	1	1	8	6	+2	5
Sweden	4	1	0	3	5	11	–6	2

Sweden	1–0	Hungary
Sweden	2–4	Czechoslovakia
Hungary	4–0	Sweden
Czechoslovakia	1–1	Hungary
Czechoslovakia	3–2	Sweden
Hungary	1–0	Czechoslovakia

=== Group 4 ===
Teams	Pld	W	D	L	GF	GA	GD	Pts
Netherlands	4	2	2	0	7	3	+4	6
Finland	4	0	3	1	4	6	–2	3
Republic of Ireland	4	0	3	1	3	5	–2	3

Finland	2–2	Republic of Ireland
Finland	1–1	Netherlands
Netherlands	3–1	Republic of Ireland
Republic of Ireland	0–0	Netherlands
Netherlands	3–1	Finland
Republic of Ireland	0–0	Finland

=== Other groups ===
Team 1	Agg.	Team 2	1st leg	2nd leg
Denmark	0–3	Scotland	0–2	0–1
Iceland	2–1	Wales	1–1	1–0
Belgium	9–2	Northern Ireland	4–1	5–1
England	3–1	France	3–1	0–0
Liechtenstein	1–13	Italy	0–6	1–7
Luxembourg	1–6	Portugal	1–4	0–2
West Germany	4–0	Switzerland	2–0	2–0
Malta	0–2	Spain	0–2	0–0
Greece	2–2 (3–2p)	East Germany	1–1	1–1
Bulgaria	2–4	Turkey	2–1	0–3
Yugoslavia	4–0	Romania	2–0	2–0
Austria	0–2	Soviet Union	0–2	0–0

== Teams ==
The following teams qualified for the tournament:

- Belgium
- England
- West Germany
- Greece
- Hungary
- Iceland
- Italy
- Netherlands
- Norway (received Bye for qualifying stage)
- Poland (host)
- Portugal
- Scotland
- Soviet Union
- Spain
- Turkey
- Yugoslavia

== Group stage ==
=== Group A ===
Teams	Pld	W	D	L	GF	GA	GD	Pts
Scotland	3	2	1	0	2	0	+2	5
Portugal	3	1	1	1	1	1	0	3
West Germany	3	1	0	2	5	5	0	2
Italy	3	0	2	1	3	5	–2	2

5 May	Italy	0–0	Portugal
	Scotland	1–0	West Germany
7 May	Scotland	1–0	Portugal
	West Germany	5–3	Italy
9 May	Scotland	0–0	Italy
	Portugal	1–0	West Germany

=== Group B ===
Teams	Pld	W	D	L	GF	GA	GD	Pts
Soviet Union	3	3	0	0	10	0	+10	6
Netherlands	3	1	1	1	3	4	–1	3
Norway	3	1	0	2	2	6	–4	2
Greece	3	0	1	2	3	8	–5	1

5 May	Soviet Union	4–0	Greece
	Netherlands	1–0	Norway
7 May	Netherlands	2–2	Greece
	Soviet Union	4–0	Norway
9 May	Soviet Union	2–0	Netherlands
	Norway	2–1	Greece

=== Group C ===
Teams	Pld	W	D	L	GF	GA	GD	Pts
Yugoslavia	2	1	1	0	4	1	+3	3
Hungary	2	1	1	0	3	1	+2	3
Iceland	2	0	0	2	2	7	–5	0
Belgium	Withdrew due to food poisoning							

5 May	Hungary	3–1	Iceland
	Yugoslavia	ABD^{1}	Belgium
7 May	Hungary	0–0	Yugoslavia
9 May	Yugoslavia	4–1	Iceland
^{1}After their first match was abandoned at 2-1, Belgium withdrew from the tournament. The team was suffering from food poisoning. Their results were annulled.

=== Group D ===
Teams	Pld	W	D	L	GF	GA	GD	Pts
Poland	3	2	0	1	5	3	+2	4
Spain	3	1	1	1	3	3	0	3
England	3	1	1	1	2	3	–1	3
Turkey	3	0	2	1	3	4	–1	2

5 May	England	1–1	Turkey
	Spain	2–1	Poland
7 May	England	1–0	Spain
	Poland	2–1	Turkey
9 May	Poland	2–0	England
	Spain	1–1	Turkey

== Semifinals ==
12 May 1978

Yugoslavia	2 – 2	Scotland
	Report
Penalties
	4 – 2

Kraków
12 May 1978

Soviet Union	2 – 0	Poland
	Report

Kraków

== Third place match ==
14 May 1978

Poland	3 – 1	Scotland
	Report

Kraków

== Final ==
14 May 1978

Soviet Union	3 – 0	Yugoslavia
	Report

Stadion Miejski, Kraków

1978 UEFA European Under-18 Championship

Soviet Union
Fourth title

== Qualification to World Youth Championship ==
The six best performing teams qualified for the 1979 FIFA World Youth Championship: four semifinalists and the best group runners-up (based on goal difference). For an unknown reason, semifinalists Scotland did not participate.

- Hungary
- Poland
- Portugal
- Soviet Union
- Spain
- Yugoslavia
