= 1979 FIFA World Youth Championship squads =

FIFA championship roster

Below are the rosters for the 1979 FIFA World Youth Championship tournament in Japan. Those marked in bold went on to earn full international caps.

== Group A ==
=== Spain ===
Head coach: Chus Pereda

No.	Pos.	Player	Date of birth (age)	Caps	Club
1	GK	Agustín Rodríguez	10 September 1959 (aged 19)		(Spain) Castilla
2	DF	Arseni Comas	28 June 1961 (aged 18)		(Spain) Gerona
3	DF	**Miguel Tendillo**	1 February 1961 (aged 18)		(Spain) Valencia
4	DF	Manolo Martínez	29 October 1960 (aged 18)		(Spain) Barcelona B
5	DF	Francis García	9 February 1960 (aged 19)		(Spain) Granada
6	DF	Agustín Camacho	17 March 1960 (aged 19)		(Spain) Almería
7	MF	Biri	14 September 1959 (aged 19)		(Spain) Algeciras
8	DF	Francisco Javier Muñoz Pérez	18 February 1960 (aged 19)		(Spain) Málaga
9	MF	Marcelino	10 April 1960 (aged 19)		(Spain) Barcelona B
10	MF	Manuel Zúñiga	19 July 1960 (aged 19)		(Spain) Calvo Sotelo
11	MF	Manolo Zambrano	8 March 1960 (aged 19)		(Spain) Recreativo Huelva
12	FW	Luis Miguel Gail	23 February 1961 (aged 18)		(Spain) Real Valladolid B
13	GK	Andoni Cedrún	5 June 1960 (aged 19)		(Spain) Bilbao Athletic
14	FW	Luis Enrique Marián	19 December 1959 (aged 19)		(Spain) Rayo Vallecano
15	FW	Joaquín Pichardo	12 August 1959 (aged 20)		(Spain) Sevilla
16	FW	**Marcos Alonso**	1 October 1959 (aged 19)		(Spain) Racing Santander
17	FW	**Juan Carlos Rojo**	17 November 1959 (aged 19)		(Spain) Barcelona B
18	FW	Modesto Pérez	7 November 1959 (aged 19)		(Spain) Getafe

=== Algeria ===
Head coach: Rachid Hanifi

No.	Pos.	Player	Date of birth (age)	Caps	Club
1	GK	Mohamed Rahmani	10 September 1959 (aged 19)		(Algeria) EP Sétif
2	MF	Mohamed Benameur	4 December 1959 (aged 19)		(Algeria) USM El Harrach
3	MF	Nasser Bouiche	18 June 1960 (aged 19)		(Algeria) MP Alger
4	MF	**Djamel Menad**	22 July 1960 (aged 19)		(Algeria) CM Belcourt
5	DF	Sid-Ali Aït Ameur	3 June 1960 (aged 19)		(Algeria) MA Hussein Dey
6	DF	Miloud Kouici	29 October 1959 (aged 19)		(Algeria) USM El Harrach
7	MF	**Hocine Yahi**	25 April 1960 (aged 19)		(Algeria) CM Belcourt
8	DF	Rabah Djenadi	13 August 1959 (aged 20)		(Algeria) DNC Alger
9	FW	Belkacem Demdoum	25 November 1959 (aged 19)		(Algeria) DNC Alger
10	FW	Boualem Baâziz	18 January 1960 (aged 19)		(Algeria) USK Alger
11	DF	Said Belagoune	1 November 1959 (aged 19)		(Algeria) CS Constantine
12	DF	Abdelhafid Bellabès	4 November 1959 (aged 19)		(Algeria) MP Oran
13	DF	Djamel Chaïbi	25 April 1960 (aged 19)		(Algeria) EP Sétif
14	FW	Mohamed Kheloufi	29 December 1959 (aged 19)		(Algeria) DNC Alger
15	DF	**Mohamed Chaïb** (c)	18 October 1959 (aged 19)		(Algeria) RS Kouba
16	MF	Rachid Sebbar	10 September 1959 (aged 19)		(Algeria) RS Kouba
17	FW	Derradji Bendjaballah	23 November 1959 (aged 19)		(Algeria) EP Sétif
18	GK	**Antar Osmani**	22 February 1960 (aged 19)		(Algeria) EP Sétif

=== Mexico ===
Head Coach: José Moncebáez

No.	Pos.	Player	Date of birth (age)	Caps	Club
1	GK	Alberto Aguilar	3 September 1960 (aged 18)		(Mexico) UAG
2	MF	José Jiménez	19 October 1960 (aged 18)		(Mexico) Cruz Azul
3	DF	Ricardo Guzmán	5 May 1961 (aged 18)		(Mexico) UNAM
4	DF	Marco Antonio Trejo	8 December 1958 (aged 20)		(Mexico) Cruz Azul
5	DF	Daniel Mora	3 January 1960 (aged 19)		(Mexico) Atletico Español
6	DF	Felipe Comparán	10 May 1960 (aged 19)		(Mexico) Cruz Azul
7	MF	Juan Antonio Luna	17 May 1959 (aged 20)		(Mexico) America
8	MF	Guillermo Padrón	11 September 1959 (aged 19)		(Mexico) America
9	FW	Mario Díaz Beltrán	19 January 1961 (aged 18)		(Mexico) Atletico Español
10	FW	Omar Mendiburu	24 April 1960 (aged 19)		(Mexico) Cruz Azul
11	FW	Jorge Moralez	16 June 1960 (aged 19)		(Mexico) Cruz Azul
12	FW	Enrique Hernández	10 February 1960 (aged 19)		(Mexico) Toluca
13	DF	Carlos Cisneros	1 August 1959 (aged 20)		(Mexico) Zacatepec
14	MF	Pablo Luna	15 April 1960 (aged 19)		(Mexico) UNAM
15	MF	Javier Trujillo	1 August 1961 (aged 18)		(Mexico) Pumas UNAM
16	MF	Armando Romero	27 October 1960 (aged 18)		(Mexico) Cruz Azul
17	FW	Ernesto Esquivel	6 April 1960 (aged 19)		(Mexico) Toluca
18	GK	**Pablo Larios**	31 July 1960 (aged 19)		(Mexico) Zacatepec

=== Japan ===
Head Coach: Ikuo Matsumoto

No.	Pos.	Player	Date of birth (age)	Caps	Club
1	GK	**Yasuhito Suzuki**	19 December 1959 (aged 19)		(Japan) Yanmar Diesel
2	DF	**Hisashi Kaneko**	12 September 1959 (aged 19)		(Japan) Furukawa Electric
3	DF	**Takeshi Koshida**	19 October 1960 (aged 18)		(Japan) University of Tsukuba
4	DF	Masaaki Yanagishita	1 January 1960 (aged 19)		(Japan) Tokyo University of Agriculture
5	DF	**Toshihiko Okimune**	7 September 1959 (aged 19)		(Japan) Fujitsu
6	DF	**Kuniharu Nakamoto**	29 October 1959 (aged 19)		(Japan) Chuo University
7	DF	Makoto Sugiyama	17 May 1960 (aged 19)		(Japan) Fujitsu
8	MF	**Shinji Tanaka**	25 September 1960 (aged 18)		(Japan) Chuo University
9	MF	**Satoshi Miyauchi**	26 November 1959 (aged 19)		(Japan) Furukawa Electric
10	FW	Jun Suzuki	17 August 1961 (aged 18)		(Japan) Sendai Mukaiyama High School
11	FW	Sadahiro Takahashi	7 January 1959 (aged 20)		(Japan) Fujita Kogyo SC
12	GK	**Satoshi Yamaguchi**	1 August 1959 (aged 20)		(Japan) Mitsubishi Motors
13	MF	**Atsushi Natori**	12 November 1961 (aged 17)		(Japan) Mitsubishi Motors
14	MF	**Yahiro Kazama**	16 October 1961 (aged 17)		(Japan) Shimizu Shogyo High School
15	FW	Shigeru Sarusawa	30 January 1960 (aged 19)		(Japan) Yanmar Diesel
16	MF	**Takashi Mizunuma**	20 May 1960 (aged 19)		(Japan) Hosei University
17	MF	**Kazuo Ozaki**	7 March 1960 (aged 19)		(Japan) Mitsubishi Motors
18	FW	**Koichi Hashiratani**	1 March 1961 (aged 18)		(Japan) Kokushikan University

== Group B ==
=== Argentina ===
Head coach: César Luis Menotti

No.	Pos.	Player	Date of birth (age)	Caps	Club
1	GK	Sergio García	10 May 1960 (aged 19)		(Argentina) Flandria
2	DF	**Juan Simón**	2 March 1960 (aged 19)		(Argentina) Newell's Old Boys
3	DF	Hugo Alves	11 November 1959 (aged 19)		(Argentina) Boca Juniors
4	DF	Abelardo Carabelli	9 June 1960 (aged 19)		(Argentina) Argentinos Juniors
5	MF	Daniel Sperandío	11 December 1959 (aged 19)		(Argentina) Rosario Central
6	DF	Rubén Rossi	10 November 1960 (aged 18)		(Argentina) Colón Santa Fe
7	FW	Osvaldo Escudero	15 October 1960 (aged 18)		(Argentina) Vélez Sársfield
8	MF	**Juan Barbas**	23 August 1959 (aged 20)		(Argentina) Racing Club
9	FW	**Ramón Díaz**	29 August 1959 (aged 19)		(Argentina) River Plate
10	MF	**Diego Maradona**	30 October 1960 (aged 18)		(Argentina) Argentinos Juniors
11	FW	**Gabriel Calderón**	7 February 1959 (aged 20)		(Argentina) Racing Club
12	GK	Rafael Seria	9 August 1960 (aged 19)		(Argentina) Central Córdoba
13	MF	Osvaldo Rinaldi	2 August 1959 (aged 20)		(Argentina) San Lorenzo
14	DF	Jorge Piaggio	7 February 1960 (aged 19)		(Argentina) Atlanta
15	DF	Marcelo Bachino	2 November 1959 (aged 19)		(Argentina) Boca Juniors
16	FW	Alfredo Torres	15 February 1960 (aged 19)		(Argentina) Atlanta
17	MF	Juan José Meza	29 March 1960 (aged 19)		(Argentina) Vélez Sársfield
18	FW	José Luis Lanao	28 January 1960 (aged 19)		(Argentina) Vélez Sársfield

=== Poland ===
Head coach: Marian Bednarczyk

No.	Pos.	Player	Date of birth (age)	Caps	Club
1	GK	**Jacek Kazimierski**	17 August 1959 (aged 20)		(Poland) Legia Warszawa
2	FW	**Marek Chojnacki**	6 December 1959 (aged 19)		(Poland) ŁKS Łódź
3	MF	**Krzysztof Kajrys**	19 August 1959 (aged 20)		(Poland) Ruch Chorzów
4	DF	**Paweł Król**	10 October 1960 (aged 18)		(Poland) Odra Opole
5	MF	**Kazimierz Buda**	3 May 1960 (aged 19)		(Poland) Stal Mielec
6	FW	**Andrzej Pałasz**	22 July 1960 (aged 19)		(Poland) Górnik Zabrze
7	FW	**Krzysztof Frankowski**	24 August 1959 (aged 20)		(Poland) Stal Mielec
8	FW	**Jarosław Nowicki**	11 January 1961 (aged 18)		(Poland) Zawisza Bydgoszcz
9	DF	**Piotr Skrobowski**	16 October 1961 (aged 17)		(Poland) Wisła Kraków
10	DF	Andrzej Gruszka	26 February 1961 (aged 18)		(Poland) Polonia Bytom
11	FW	Jan Janiec	31 August 1959 (aged 19)		(Poland) Zagłębie Wałbrzych
12	GK	**Janusz Stawarz**	1 December 1959 (aged 19)		(Poland) Stal Mielec
13	MF	**Andrzej Buncol**	27 September 1959 (aged 19)		(Poland) Ruch Chorzów
14	MF	**Mirosław Pękala**	15 October 1961 (aged 17)		(Poland) Śląsk Wrocław
15	DF	Bogusław Skiba	16 November 1960 (aged 18)		(Poland) Stal Mielec
16	DF	Krzysztof Jarosz	19 August 1959 (aged 20)		(Poland) Śląsk Wrocław
17	DF	Tadeusz Wiśniewski	3 January 1960 (aged 19)		(Poland) Zawisza Bydgoszcz
18	FW	**Krzysztof Baran**	26 July 1960 (aged 19)		(Poland) Gwardia Warszawa

=== Yugoslavia ===
Head coach: Ivan Toplak

No.	Pos.	Player	Date of birth (age)	Caps	Club
1	GK	**Tomislav Ivković**	11 August 1960 (aged 19)		(Socialist Federal Republic of Yugoslavia) Dinamo Zagreb
2	GK	**Ivan Pudar**	16 August 1961 (aged 18)		(Socialist Federal Republic of Yugoslavia) Hajduk Split
3	DF	**Milan Janković**	30 December 1959 (aged 19)		(Socialist Federal Republic of Yugoslavia) Maribor
4	FW	**Zvonko Živković**	31 October 1959 (aged 19)		(Socialist Federal Republic of Yugoslavia) Partizan
5	DF	Robert Juričko	27 September 1959 (aged 19)		(Socialist Federal Republic of Yugoslavia) Hajduk Split
6	MF	**Marko Elsner**	11 April 1960 (aged 19)		(Socialist Federal Republic of Yugoslavia) Olimpija Ljubljana
7	DF	**Boško Đurovski**	28 December 1961 (aged 17)		(Socialist Federal Republic of Yugoslavia) Red Star Belgrade
8	MF	**Ivan Gudelj**	21 September 1960 (aged 18)		(Socialist Federal Republic of Yugoslavia) Hajduk Split
9	MF	Radomir Radulović	14 August 1960 (aged 19)		(Socialist Federal Republic of Yugoslavia) Partizan
10	MF	**Mehmed Baždarević** (c)	28 September 1960 (aged 18)		(Socialist Federal Republic of Yugoslavia) Željezničar
11	FW	Haris Smajić	8 March 1960 (aged 19)		(Socialist Federal Republic of Yugoslavia) Sarajevo
12	DF	Vlaho Macan	15 October 1959 (aged 19)		(Socialist Federal Republic of Yugoslavia) Hajduk Split
13	FW	Zvonko Varga	27 November 1959 (aged 19)		(Socialist Federal Republic of Yugoslavia) Partizan
14	FW	Nedeljko Milosavljević	12 February 1960 (aged 19)		(Socialist Federal Republic of Yugoslavia) Red Star Belgrade
15	FW	Zdravko Čakalić	16 August 1960 (aged 19)		(Socialist Federal Republic of Yugoslavia) Red Star Belgrade
16	MF	Borislav Mitrović	18 January 1961 (aged 18)		(Socialist Federal Republic of Yugoslavia) Red Star Belgrade
17	FW	**Marko Mlinarić**	1 September 1960 (aged 18)		(Socialist Federal Republic of Yugoslavia) Dinamo Zagreb
18	DF	**Vlado Čapljić**	22 March 1962 (aged 17)		(Socialist Federal Republic of Yugoslavia) Željezničar

=== Indonesia ===
Head Coach: Soetjipto Soentoro

No.	Pos.	Player	Date of birth (age)	Caps	Club
1	GK	Fachrizal	14 August 1959 (aged 20)		(Indonesia) Perkesa 78
2	DF	Eddy Sudarnoto	31 December 1960 (aged 18)		(Indonesia) Jayakarta
3	FW	Bambang Irianto	14 September 1959 (aged 19)		(Indonesia) Jayakarta
4	DF	Imam Murtanto	16 November 1959 (aged 19)		(Indonesia) Tidar Sakti
5	MF	Memed Permadi	14 December 1959 (aged 19)		(Indonesia) Jayakarta
6	FW	David Sulaksmono	3 August 1959 (aged 20)		(Indonesia) Jayakarta
7	FW	Pepen Rubianto	17 July 1960 (aged 19)		(Indonesia) Buana Putra
8	MF	Budhi Tanoto	23 March 1961 (aged 18)		(Indonesia) Tunas Jaya
9	FW	Bambang Sunarto	15 November 1959 (aged 19)		(Indonesia) Jaka Utama
10	MF	Arief Hidayat	30 August 1959 (aged 19)		(Indonesia) Persija Jakarta
11	FW	Syamsul Suryono	17 September 1959 (aged 19)		Indonesia Muda
12	DF	Didik Darmadi	14 March 1960 (aged 19)		(Indonesia) Persis Solo
13	DF	Nus Lengkoan	30 December 1959 (aged 19)		Indonesia Muda
14	DF	Tommy Latuperisa	2 December 1959 (aged 19)		(Indonesia) PSMS Medan
15	MF	Mundari Karya	10 December 1959 (aged 19)		(Indonesia) Jaka Utama
16	MF	Subangkit	29 November 1960 (aged 18)		(Indonesia) Jaka Utama
17	FW	**Bambang Nurdiansyah**	28 May 1960 (aged 19)		(Indonesia) Arseto
18	GK	Endang Tirtana	3 December 1959 (aged 19)		(Indonesia) Warna Agung

== Group C ==
=== Paraguay ===
Head Coach: Salvador Breglia

No.	Pos.	Player	Date of birth (age)	Caps	Club
1	GK	**Julián Coronel**	23 October 1958 (aged 20)		(Paraguay) Club Guaraní
2	DF	Carlos Olmedo	18 June 1960 (aged 19)		(Paraguay) Sportivo Luqueño
3	DF	Oscar Surián	7 August 1959 (aged 20)		(Paraguay) Club Libertad
4	DF	Arnaldo Vera	29 May 1960 (aged 19)		(Paraguay) Club Rubio Ñu
5	DF	Hugo Caballero	4 July 1960 (aged 19)		(Paraguay) Cerro Porteño
6	DF	**Rogelio Delgado**	12 October 1959 (aged 19)		(Paraguay) Club Olimpia
7	FW	Severiano Cardozo Arévalo	8 August 1959 (aged 20)		(Paraguay) Club Libertad
8	FW	Candido Giménez	3 October 1959 (aged 19)		(Paraguay) Club River Plate
9	FW	Juan Ramón Isasi	22 September 1959 (aged 19)		(Paraguay) Club Rubio Ñu
10	FW	**Romerito**	28 August 1960 (aged 18)		(Paraguay) Sportivo Luqueño
11	FW	Ricardo Valinotti	4 May 1960 (aged 19)		(Paraguay) Club Libertad
12	GK	Jacinto Elizeche	11 September 1959 (aged 19)		(Paraguay) Cerro Porteño
13	DF	Lizandro Cabrera	15 March 1960 (aged 19)		(Paraguay) Club Libertad
14	FW	**Roberto Cabañas**	11 April 1961 (aged 18)		(Paraguay) Cerro Porteño
15	MF	Fidel Miño	24 April 1960 (aged 19)		(Paraguay) Club Sol de América
16	FW	Eulalio Mora	10 December 1961 (aged 17)		(Paraguay) Club Guaraní
17	DF	Luis García	25 July 1961 (aged 18)		(Paraguay) Club Rubio Ñu
18	FW	Julio Achucarro	1 June 1961 (aged 18)		(Paraguay) Club Sol de América

=== Portugal ===
Head Coach: Jose Augusto Peres Bandeira

No.	Pos.	Player	Date of birth (age)	Caps	Goals	Club
1	GK	**Zé Beto**	21 February 1960 (aged 19)	1	0	(Portuguese Football Federation) FC Porto
2	FW	**Nascimento**	22 March 1960 (aged 19)	2	1	(Portuguese Football Federation) União Leiria
3	DF	Santana	21 March 1960 (aged 19)	3	0	(Portuguese Football Federation) Estoril
4	DF	Tomás	14 January 1960 (aged 19)	2	0	(Portuguese Football Federation) Beira Mar
5	DF	Alberto Bastos Lopes	22 October 1959 (aged 19)	2	0	(Portuguese Football Federation) Estoril
6	FW	Galhofas	26 June 1960 (aged 19)	1	0	(Portuguese Football Federation) Estoril
7	MF	Parente	8 April 1961 (aged 18)	1	0	(Portuguese Football Federation) Estoril
8	FW	Galvanito	30 April 1960 (aged 19)	1	0	(Portuguese Football Federation) Portimonense
9	MF	**Adão**	3 April 1960 (aged 19)	2	0	(Portuguese Football Federation) Chaves
10	FW	João Santos	18 October 1959 (aged 19)	0	0	(Portuguese Football Federation) Estoril
11	DF	Artur	8 August 1959 (aged 20)	1	0	(Portuguese Football Federation) S.C. Vila Real
12	GK	Justino	14 December 1960 (aged 18)	2	0	(Portuguese Football Federation) Sporting
13	DF	João Gouveia	13 November 1959 (aged 19)	1	0	(Portuguese Football Federation) FC Porto
14	MF	**Quim**	23 August 1959 (aged 20)	2	0	(Portuguese Football Federation) Rio Ave
15	MF	Jorge Oliveira	11 March 1960 (aged 19)	2	0	(Portuguese Football Federation) União de Coimbra
16	DF	Eliseu	16 February 1960 (aged 19)	2	0	(Portuguese Football Federation) Leixões
17	FW	**Diamantino**	3 August 1959 (aged 20)	3	1	(Portuguese Football Federation) Benfica
18	FW	João Grilo	1 August 1959 (aged 20)	3	0	(Portuguese Football Federation) S.C. Vila Real

=== South Korea ===
Head coach: Kim Chan-Ki

No.	Pos.	Player	Date of birth (age)	Caps	Club
1	GK	**Oh Yeon-Kyo**	25 May 1960 (aged 19)		(South Korea) Hanyang University
2	DF	Kim Young-Chul	28 April 1960 (aged 19)		(South Korea) Korea Electric Power
3	DF	Song Young-Seok	2 November 1959 (aged 19)		(South Korea) Hanyang University
4	DF	Park Bok-Jun	21 April 1960 (aged 19)		(South Korea) Anyang Technical High School
5	DF	Kim Myung-Kwan	27 November 1959 (aged 19)		(South Korea) Korea Electric Power
6	DF	**Chung Yong-Hwan**	10 February 1960 (aged 19)		(South Korea) Dongnae High School
7	MF	**Hwang Seok-Keun**	3 September 1960 (aged 18)		(South Korea) Korea University
8	MF	**Lee Kil-Yong**	29 September 1959 (aged 19)		(South Korea) Korea University
9	FW	Lee Sang-Yong	25 January 1961 (aged 18)		(South Korea) Korea University
10	MF	**Lee Tae-Ho**	29 January 1961 (aged 18)		(South Korea) Korea University
11	FW	Kim Suk-Won	7 November 1961 (aged 17)		(South Korea) Korea University
12	MF	Kim Hak-Chul	19 October 1959 (aged 19)		(South Korea) Chung-Ang University
13	FW	**Kim Yong-Se**	21 April 1960 (aged 19)		(South Korea) Korea Electric Power
14	FW	Kim Man-Soo	19 June 1961 (aged 18)		(South Korea) Dongnae High School
15	DF	Jeon Cha-Sik	27 September 1959 (aged 19)		(South Korea) POSCO FC
16	FW	**Choi Soon-Ho**	10 January 1962 (aged 17)		(South Korea) Cheongju Commercial High School
17	FW	Park Yoon-Ki	10 June 1960 (aged 19)		(South Korea) Seoul Metropolitan Government
18	GK	Seo Suk-Beom	12 September 1960 (aged 18)		(South Korea) Hanyeong High School

=== Canada ===
Head coach: Barrie Clarke

No.	Pos.	Player	Date of birth (age)	Caps	Club
1	GK	**Chris Turner**	1 February 1960 (aged 19)		(United States) San Jose Earthquakes
2	DF	Carlo Alberti	26 August 1959 (aged 20)		(United States) Houston Hurricane
3	DF	Danny Lenarduzzi	31 August 1959 (aged 19)		(Canada) Vancouver Whitecaps
4	DF	Michael Sephton	17 September 1960 (aged 18)		(Canada) Columbus Clan
5	DF	**Ian Bridge**	18 September 1959 (aged 19)		(United States) Seattle Sounders
6	DF	David McGill	28 May 1960 (aged 19)		(Canada) Vancouver Whitecaps
7	MF	Gaspard D'Alexis	6 January 1960 (aged 19)		(Canada) Inex Toronto
8	FW	Brent Barling	28 April 1961 (aged 18)		(Canada) Vancouver Whitecaps
9	MF	David McCaig	28 May 1960 (aged 19)		(Canada) Montreal Carabins
10	MF	Graham Hatley	26 October 1960 (aged 18)		(Canada) Toronto Blizzard
11	MF	**Mike Sweeney**	25 December 1959 (aged 19)		(Canada) Edmonton Drillers
12	MF	Paul Roe	21 November 1959 (aged 19)		(Canada) Edmonton Drillers
13	FW	**Gerry Gray**	20 January 1961 (aged 18)		(Canada) Vancouver Whitecaps
14	FW	**Chris Chueden**	18 February 1961 (aged 18)		(Canada) FC Sagres Victoria
15	FW	Ross Ongaro	9 September 1959 (aged 19)		(Canada) Edmonton Drillers
16	FW	Lou Nagy	9 May 1960 (aged 19)		(Canada) Toronto Blizzard
17	FW	**Branko Segota**	8 June 1961 (aged 18)		(United States) Rochester Lancers
18	GK	Carlos Almeida	8 May 1961 (aged 18)		(Canada) Columbus Clan

== Group D ==
=== Uruguay ===
Head coach: Raúl Bentancor

No.	Pos.	Player	Date of birth (age)	Caps	Club
1	GK	**Fernando Álvez**	4 September 1959 (aged 19)		(Uruguay) Peñarol
2	DF	Domingo Cáceres	7 September 1959 (aged 19)		(Uruguay) Club Atlético Peñarol
3	DF	Nelson Alaguich	20 August 1959 (aged 20)		(Uruguay) Danubio
4	DF	**Miguel Bossio**	10 February 1960 (aged 19)		(Uruguay) Sud América
5	MF	**Arsenio Luzardo**	3 September 1959 (aged 19)		(Uruguay) Nacional
6	DF	Daniel Martínez Tapié	21 December 1959 (aged 19)		(Uruguay) Danubio
7	FW	**Ernesto Vargas**	1 May 1961 (aged 18)		(Uruguay) Peñarol
8	MF	**Jorge Barrios**	24 January 1961 (aged 18)		(Uruguay) Wanderers
9	FW	**Rubén Paz**	8 August 1959 (aged 20)		(Uruguay) Peñarol
10	MF	Ricardo Viera	19 May 1960 (aged 19)		(Uruguay) Danubio
11	FW	Eber Bueno	13 September 1959 (aged 19)		(Uruguay) Bella Vista
12	GK	Mario Viera	19 October 1959 (aged 19)		(Uruguay) OFI
13	DF	**Daniel Felipe Revelez**	30 September 1959 (aged 19)		(Uruguay) Bella Vista
14	DF	**Nelson Gutiérrez**	13 April 1962 (aged 17)		(Uruguay) Peñarol
15	DF	Héctor Molina	31 October 1959 (aged 19)		(Uruguay) Nacional
16	MF	Sergio González	16 November 1960 (aged 18)		(Uruguay) Montevideo Wanderers
17	FW	Pablo Alonso	12 February 1960 (aged 19)		(Uruguay) Bella Vista
18	FW	Carlos Larrañaga	26 May 1960 (aged 19)		(Uruguay) Bella Vista

=== Soviet Union ===
Head coach: Sergei Korshunov

No.	Pos.	Player	Date of birth (age)	Caps	Club
1	GK	**Viktor Chanov**	21 July 1959 (aged 20)		(Soviet Union) Shakhtar Donetsk
2	DF	**Viktor Yanushevsky**	23 January 1960 (aged 19)		(Soviet Union) Dinamo Minsk
3	DF	Aleksandr Golovnya	20 November 1959 (aged 19)		(Soviet Union) Dinamo Minsk
4	DF	**Ashot Khachatryan**	3 August 1959 (aged 20)		(Soviet Union) Ararat Yerevan
5	DF	Aleksandr Polukarov	27 November 1959 (aged 19)		(Soviet Union) Zorya Voroshilovgrad
6	MF	Yaroslav Dumansky	4 August 1959 (aged 20)		(Soviet Union) Karpaty Lvov
7	MF	Mikhail Olefirenko	6 June 1960 (aged 19)		(Soviet Union) Dinamo Kiev
8	MF	**Igor Ponomaryov**	24 February 1960 (aged 19)		(Soviet Union) Neftchi Baku
9	FW	Valeriy Zubenko	27 August 1959 (aged 19)		(Soviet Union) Zorya Voroshilovgrad
10	FW	Oleh Taran	11 January 1960 (aged 19)		(Soviet Union) Dinamo Kiev
11	FW	**Ihar Hurynovich**	5 March 1960 (aged 19)		(Soviet Union) Dinamo Minsk
12	DF	Gennadiy Salov	2 February 1960 (aged 19)		(Soviet Union) Torpedo Moscow
13	FW	**Sergei Stukashov**	12 November 1959 (aged 19)		(Soviet Union) Kairat Almaty
14	DF	Sergey Ovchinnikov	25 October 1960 (aged 18)		(Soviet Union) SKA Kiev
15	MF	Anatoliy Radenko	3 August 1959 (aged 20)		(Soviet Union) Shakhtar Donetsk
16	MF	Vladimir Mikhalevsky	29 November 1959 (aged 19)		(Soviet Union) Neftchi Baku
17	MF	**Oleksandr Zavarov**	20 April 1961 (aged 18)		(Soviet Union) Zorya Voroshilovgrad
18	GK	Serhiy Krakovskyi	11 August 1960 (aged 19)		(Soviet Union) Dinamo Kiev

=== Hungary ===
Head Coach: Gyula Rakosi

No.	Pos.	Player	Date of birth (age)	Caps	Club
1	GK	**Péter Disztl**	30 March 1960 (aged 19)		(Hungary) Videoton
2	DF	Gyula Mohácsi	9 February 1960 (aged 19)		(Hungary) Csepel
3	DF	**Antal Róth**	14 September 1960 (aged 18)		(Hungary) Pécsi Munkás
4	DF	**Sándor Sallai**	26 March 1960 (aged 19)		(Hungary) Debrecen
5	DF	**József Nagy**	21 October 1960 (aged 18)		(Hungary) Szombathelyi Haladás
6	MF	**József Kardos**	22 March 1960 (aged 19)		(Hungary) Salgótarján
7	FW	Béla Melis	25 September 1959 (aged 19)		(Hungary) Budapest Honvéd
8	MF	István Pandúr	10 August 1960 (aged 19)		(Hungary) Budapest Honvéd
9	FW	Sándor Segesvári	15 April 1960 (aged 19)		(Hungary) Dunaújvárosi Kohász
10	MF	György Szeibert	29 December 1960 (aged 18)		(Hungary) Budapesti VSC
11	FW	**Gábor Pölöskei**	11 October 1961 (aged 17)		(Hungary) Rába ETO Győr
12	MF	Árpád Miklós	14 June 1960 (aged 19)		(Hungary) Gyori ETC FC
13	FW	Miklós Kökény	2 May 1961 (aged 18)		(Hungary) Csepel SC
14	FW	Róbert Koch	19 December 1961 (aged 17)		(Hungary) Ferencváros
15	MF	János Paksi	23 March 1960 (aged 19)		(Hungary) Csepel SC
16	DF	Attila Dózsa	2 January 1960 (aged 19)		(Hungary) Dunaújváros FC
17	MF	György Kerepeczky	14 September 1959 (aged 19)		(Hungary) Budapest Honvéd
18	GK	Miklós Józsa	30 March 1961 (aged 18)		(Hungary) Ferencváros

=== Guinea ===
Head Coach: Nabi Camara

No.	Pos.	Player	Date of birth (age)	Caps	Club
1	GK	Byly Loua	18 May 1961 (aged 18)		(Guinea) Horoya Atletique Club
2	DF	Amadou Diallo	25 July 1960 (aged 19)		(Guinea) Makona FC
3	DF	Ibrahima Sy	12 February 1961 (aged 18)		(Guinea) Kaloum AS
4	DF	Aboubacar Keita	2 July 1960 (aged 19)		(Guinea) Gangan FC
5	DF	Ibrahima Soumah	7 November 1959 (aged 19)		(Guinea) Olympique Kakande
6	MF	Salifou Keita	8 October 1959 (aged 19)		(Guinea) Hafia FC
7	FW	Aboubacar Sidiki	22 October 1962 (aged 16)		(Guinea) FC Kindia
8	MF	Alkaly Ndour	3 April 1960 (aged 19)		(Guinea) Makona FC
9	FW	Fazinet Camara	3 January 1960 (aged 19)		(Guinea) UC Kankan
10	MF	Aly Diallo	7 August 1960 (aged 19)		(Guinea) Olympique Kakande
11	FW	Fodé Fofana	14 November 1961 (aged 17)		(Guinea) Hafia FC
12	MF	Oumar Bangoura	16 February 1961 (aged 18)		(Guinea) Gangan FC
13	FW	Sékou Keita	7 August 1960 (aged 19)		(Guinea) Horoya Atletique Club
14	FW	Gassim Camara	3 January 1960 (aged 19)		(Guinea) Kindia FC
15	MF	Jean Pierre Sylla	21 March 1960 (aged 19)		(Guinea) Olympique Kakande
16	DF	Sékou Bangoura	10 October 1959 (aged 19)		(Guinea) UC Kankan
17	MF	Morlaye Sakho	4 November 1960 (aged 18)		(Guinea) Gangan FC
18	GK	Soukourou Keita	4 September 1960 (aged 18)		(Guinea) Kaloum AS
