= 1982 African Cup of Nations squads =

Below is a list of squads used in the 1982 African Cup of Nations.

== Group A ==
=== Cameroon ===
Coach: (Socialist Federal Republic of Yugoslavia) Branko Žutić

| No. | Pos. | Player | Date of birth (age) | Caps | Goals | Club |
|---|---|---|---|---|---|---|
| | GK | Thomas Nkono | 20 July 1955 (aged 26) | | | (Cameroonian Football Federation) Canon Yaoundé |
| | DF | Ibrahim Aoudou | 23 August 1955 (aged 26) | | | (French Football Federation) Cannes |
| | DF | Edmond Enoka | 17 December 1955 (aged 26) | | | (Cameroonian Football Federation) Dragon Douala |
| | DF | Emmanuel Kundé | 15 July 1956 (aged 25) | | | (Cameroonian Football Federation) Canon Yaoundé |
| | DF | René Ndjeya | 9 October 1953 (aged 28) | | | (Cameroonian Football Federation) Union Douala |
| | DF | François Ndoumbé | 30 January 1954 (aged 28) | | | (Cameroonian Football Federation) Union Douala |
| | DF | Elie Onana | 13 October 1951 (aged 30) | | | (Cameroonian Football Federation) Federal Foumban |
| | MF | Théophile Abega | 9 July 1954 (aged 27) | | | (Cameroonian Football Federation) Canon Yaoundé |
| | MF | Joseph Enanga | 28 August 1958 (aged 23) | | | (Cameroonian Football Federation) Union Douala |
| 8 | MF | Grégoire Mbida | 27 January 1952 (aged 30) | | | (Cameroonian Football Federation) Canon Yaoundé |
| | MF | Ephrem Mbom | 19 October 1955 (aged 26) | | | (Cameroonian Football Federation) Canon Yaoundé |
| | MF | Charles Toubé | 22 January 1958 (aged 24) | | | (Cameroonian Football Federation) Tonnerre Yaoundé |
| | FW | Bonaventure Djonkep | 20 August 1961 (aged 20) | | | (Cameroonian Football Federation) Union Douala |
| | FW | Ernest Ebongué | 15 May 1962 (aged 19) | | | (Cameroonian Football Federation) Tonnerre Yaoundé |
| | FW | Eugène Ekoulé | 1955 | | | (Cameroonian Football Federation) Union Douala |
| | FW | Roger Milla | 20 May 1952 (aged 29) | | | (French Football Federation) Bastia |
| 18 | FW | Jacques N'Guea | 8 January 1955 (aged 27) | | | (Cameroonian Football Federation) Canon Yaoundé |

=== Ghana ===
Coach: (Ghana) Charles Gyamfi

| No. | Pos. | Player | Date of birth (age) | Caps | Club |
|---|---|---|---|---|---|
| 1 | GK | Joseph Carr | | | (Ghana) Asante Kotoko |
| | DF | Haruna Yusif | | | (Ghana) Asante Kotoko |
| | DF | Charles Kwame Sampson | | | (Ghana) Hasaacas |
| | DF | Sampson "Gaddafi" Lamptey | 15 April 1958 (aged 23) | | (Ghana) Hearts of Oak |
| | DF | Seth Ampadu | | | (Ghana) Asante Kotoko |
| | GK | John Baker | 1948 | | (Ghana) Eleven Wise |
| | MF | John Essien | | | (Ghana) Hasaacas |
| 13 | FW | Emmanuel Quarshie (c) | 6 May 1953 (aged 28) | | (Ghana) Hasaacas |
| 9 | FW | Opoku Afriyie | 29 January 1945 (aged 37) | | (Ghana) Asante Kotoko |
| | MF | Opoku Nti | 23 January 1961 (aged 21) | | (Ghana) Asante Kotoko |
| | FW | George Alhassan | 11 November 1955 (aged 26) | | (Ghana) Great Olympics |
| | MF | Windsor Koffi Abbrey | | | (Ghana) Hasaacas |
| | MF | Acquaye Mclean | | | (Ghana) Great Olympics |
| | DF | Akwasi Appiah | 30 June 1960 (aged 21) | | (Ghana) Prestea Mine Stars |
| | DF | Hesse Odamtten | 5 February 1959 (aged 23) | | (Ghana) Hearts of Oak |
| 8 | DF | Isaac Paha | 23 May 1953 (aged 28) | | (Ghana) Hasaacas |
| | MF | Albert Asaase | | | (Ghana) Asante Kotoko |
| | MF | Abedi Pele | 5 November 1964 (aged 17) | | (Ghana) Real Tamale United |
| | FW | Ben Kayede | | | (Ghana) Great Olympics |
| | MF | Kofi Badu | | | (Ghana) Asante Kotoko |
| | MF | John Bannerman | | | (Ghana) Asante Kotoko |
| 22 | GK | Michael Owusu Mensah | | | (Ghana) Hearts of Oak |

=== Libya ===
Coach: (Hungary) Bela Goltl

| No. | Pos. | Player | Date of birth (age) | Caps | Goals | Club |
|---|---|---|---|---|---|---|
| 1 | GK | Ramzy Al-Kouafi | | | | (Libyan Football Federation) Al-Ahly Benghazi SC |
| 21 | GK | Mesbah Shanqab | 30 November 1966 (aged 15) | | | (Libyan Football Federation) Al-Ahly Tripoli SC |
| 2 | DF | Sassi Al-Ajeli | 23 April 1960 (aged 21) | | | (Libyan Football Federation) Al-Madina SC |
| 4 | DF | Mehdi Al-Kharef | 20 February 1956 (aged 26) | | | (Libyan Football Federation) Al Dhahra SC |
| 5 | DF | Saleh Sola | 1955 | | | (Libyan Football Federation) Al-Ahly Tripoli SC |
| 3 | DF | Ali Musa Al-Beshari | 2 June 1963 (aged 18) | | | (Libyan Football Federation) Al-Ahly Benghazi SC |
| 14 | DF | Abdallah Zeiyu | 1958 | | | (Libyan Football Federation) Al-Hilal Benghazi SC |
| 15 | MF | Mohamed Majdoub | | | | (Libyan Football Federation) Al-Najm Al-Sahely |
| 18 | MF | Abdel Razak Al-Farjani | | | | (Libyan Football Federation) Al Dhahra SC |
| 9 | FW | Abdel Razak Jaranah | | | | (Libyan Football Federation) Al-Wahda SC |
| 6 | MF | Suleiman Omar | 1959 | | | (Libyan Football Federation) Al-Ittihad Club |
| 12 | MF | Abubaker Ben-Suleiman | | | | (Libyan Football Federation) Al-Madina SC |
| 10 | MF | Fawzi Al-Issawi | 27 February 1960 (aged 22) | | | (Libyan Football Federation) Al-Nasr Club |
| 8 | MF | Abdel Fatah Al-Farjani | | | | (Libyan Football Federation) Al Dhahra SC |
| 11 | MF | Abdel Salam Al-Maghribi | | | | (Libyan Football Federation) Al-Madina SC |
| 16 | MF | Salem Al-Jehani | | | | (Libyan Football Federation) Al-Ahly Tripoli SC |
| 17 | FW | Abdel Moneim Ghonaïm | 1953 | | | (Libyan Football Federation) Darnes SC |
| 7 | FW | Faraj Al-Bor'osi | 1960 | | | (Libyan Football Federation) Al-Nasr Club |
| 13 | FW | Mohammad Al-Teer | | | | (Libyan Football Federation) |
| 19 | FW | Basheer Al-Rayani | 1955 | | | (Libyan Football Federation) Al-Ittihad Club |
| 20 | MF | Abubaker Ben Brahim | | | | (Libyan Football Federation) Al-Ahly Tripoli SC |
| 22 | DF | Mahfod Al-Hadi | | | | (Libyan Football Federation) |

=== Tunisia ===
Coach: (Poland) Ryszard Kulesza

| No. | Pos. | Player | Date of birth (age) | Caps | Goals | Club |
|---|---|---|---|---|---|---|
| | GK | Kamel Karia | 12 December 1950 (aged 31) | | | (Tunisian Football Federation) ES Tunis |
| | GK | Mokhtar Naili | 3 September 1953 (aged 28) | | | (Tunisian Football Federation) Club Africain |
| | DF | Hachemi Ouahchi | 25 December 1960 (aged 21) | | | (Tunisian Football Federation) ES Sahel |
| | DF | Abdelhamid Kanzari | 26 February 1954 (aged 28) | | | (Tunisian Football Federation) ES Tunis |
| | DF | Khaled Ben Yahia | 12 November 1959 (aged 22) | | | (Tunisian Football Federation) ES Tunis |
| | DF | Ali Kaabi | 15 November 1953 (aged 28) | | | (Tunisian Football Federation) COT Tunis |
| | DF | Amor Jebali | 24 December 1956 (aged 25) | | | (Tunisian Football Federation) AS Marsa |
| 10 | MF | Tarak Dhiab | 15 July 1954 (aged 27) | | | (Tunisian Football Federation) ES Tunis |
| | MF | Kamel Seddik | | | | (Tunisian Football Federation) CS Hammam-Lif |
| | MF | Lotfi Hsoumi | 13 May 1960 (aged 21) | | | (Tunisian Football Federation) ES Sahel |
| | FW | Riadh Fahem | 13 October 1959 (aged 22) | | | (Tunisian Football Federation) ES Tunis |
| | MF | Kamel Gabsi | 20 January 1960 (aged 22) | | | (Tunisian Football Federation) ES Sahel |
| | FW | Lassaad Abdelli | 18 September 1960 (aged 21) | | | (Tunisian Football Federation) Club Africain |
| | FW | Samir Ben Messaoud | 20 June 1962 (aged 19) | | | (Tunisian Football Federation) AS Marsa |
| | DF | Abderrazek Chebbi | 9 February 1962 (aged 20) | | | (Tunisian Football Federation) ES Sahel |
| | FW | Hamadi Chergui | | | | (Tunisian Football Federation) |
| | FW | Mohamed Hedi Gomri | | | | (Tunisian Football Federation) JS Kairouan |

== Group B ==
=== Algeria ===
Coach: Mahieddine Khalef

| No. | Pos. | Player | Date of birth (age) | Caps | Goals | Club |
|---|---|---|---|---|---|---|
| 1 | GK | Mehdi Cerbah | 3 January 1953 (aged 29) | | | (Algerian Football Federation) RS Kouba |
| 2 | DF | Rabah Djenadi | 3 June 1959 (aged 22) | | | (Algerian Football Federation) JH Djazaïr |
| 3 | DF | Mustapha Kouici | 16 April 1954 (aged 27) | | | (Algerian Football Federation) CM Belcourt |
| 4 | DF | Meziane Ighil | 12 January 1954 (aged 28) | | | (Algerian Football Federation) MA Hussein Dey |
| 5 | DF | Chaabane Merzekane | 8 March 1959 (aged 22) | | | (Algerian Football Federation) MA Hussein Dey |
| 6 | MF | Ali Bencheikh | 9 January 1955 (aged 27) | | | (Algerian Football Federation) MP Alger |
| 7 | FW | Salah Assad | 10 June 1958 (aged 23) | | | (Algerian Football Federation) RS Kouba |
| 8 | MF | Ali Fergani (c) | 21 September 1952 (aged 29) | | | (Algerian Football Federation) JE Tizi-Ouzou |
| 9 | MF | Mohamed Saïd Amokrane | 25 January 1957 (aged 25) | | | (Algerian Football Federation) USM Ain Beida |
| 10 | MF | Lakhdar Belloumi | 29 December 1958 (aged 23) | | | (Algerian Football Federation) GCR Mascara |
| 11 | FW | Rabah Madjer | 15 December 1958 (aged 23) | | | (Algerian Football Federation) MA Hussein Dey |
| 12 | DF | Salah Larbès | 16 September 1952 (aged 29) | | | (Algerian Football Federation) JE Tizi-Ouzou |
| 13 | MF | Hocine Yahi | 25 April 1960 (aged 21) | | | (Algerian Football Federation) CM Belcourt |
| 14 | FW | Djamel Zidane | 28 April 1955 (aged 26) | | | (Royal Belgian Football Association) KV Kortrijk |
| 15 | MF | Lyes Bahbouh | 6 April 1957 (aged 24) | | | (Algerian Football Federation) JE Tizi-Ouzou |
| 16 | FW | Ahmed Aït El-Hocine | 30 June 1957 (aged 24) | | | (Algerian Football Federation) MA Hussein Dey |
| 17 | DF | Abdelkader Horr | 10 November 1953 (aged 28) | | | (Algerian Football Federation) MA Hussein Dey |
| 18 | MF | Mohamed Kaci Said | 2 May 1958 (aged 23) | | | (Algerian Football Federation) RS Kouba |
| 19 | DF | Redouane Drici | 7 March 1959 (aged 22) | | | (Algerian Football Federation) RS Kouba |
| 20 | FW | Mohamed Kheloufi | 12 May 1959 (aged 22) | | | (Algerian Football Federation) JH Djazaïr |
| 21 | GK | Mourad Amara | 19 February 1959 (aged 23) | | | (Algerian Football Federation) JE Tizi-Ouzou |
| 22 | GK | Yacine Bentalaa | 24 September 1955 (aged 26) | | | (Algerian Football Federation) RS Kouba |

=== Ethiopia ===
Coach: Mengistu Worku

| No. | Pos. | Player | Date of birth (age) | Caps | Goals | Club |
|---|---|---|---|---|---|---|
| | GK | Tesfaye Gebru | | | | (Ethiopian Football Federation) |
| | GK | Kebret Lemma | | | | (Ethiopian Football Federation) |
| | DF | Ejigu Mulualem | | | | (Ethiopian Football Federation) |
| | DF | Taffesse Tamerat | | | | (Ethiopian Football Federation) |
| | DF | Tesfaye Kebede | | | | (Ethiopian Football Federation) |
| | DF | Urge Ayele | | | | (Ethiopian Football Federation) |
| | MF | Goshu Hailu | | | | (Ethiopian Football Federation) Omedla |
| | MF | Mondemu Bekele Ermias | | | | (Ethiopian Football Federation) |
| | DF | Demissie Dagnachew | | | | (Ethiopian Football Federation) |
| | FW | Dagnew Tesfamichael | | | | (Ethiopian Football Federation) |
| | DF | Solomon Asefa | | | | (Ethiopian Football Federation) |
| | FW | Gebre Neguse | 1955 | | | (Ethiopian Football Federation) Omedla |
| | MF | Teka Kassahun | 23 August 1950 (aged 31) | | | (Ethiopian Football Federation) |
| | FW | Christos Tefera | | | | (Ethiopian Football Federation) |
| | MF | Abreha Girma | | | | (Ethiopian Football Federation) |
| | FW | Aberra Hadish | 1960 | | | (Ethiopian Football Federation) |

=== Nigeria ===
Coach: (Brazil) Otto Glória

| No. | Pos. | Player | Date of birth (age) | Caps | Goals | Club |
|---|---|---|---|---|---|---|
| | GK | Peter Fregene | 17 May 1947 (aged 34) | | | (Nigeria Football Federation) Lagos ECN |
| | GK | Best Ogedegbe | 3 September 1954 (aged 27) | | | (Nigeria Football Federation) Shooting Stars F.C. |
| 12 | DF | Ademola Adeshina | 4 June 1964 (aged 17) | | | (Nigeria Football Federation) Shooting Stars F.C. |
| | DF | Tunde Bamidele | 13 May 1953 (aged 28) | | | (Nigeria Football Federation) Shooting Stars F.C. |
| | DF | Leotis Boateng | 8 March 1951 (aged 30) | | | (Nigeria Football Federation) Bendel Insurance F.C. |
| | DF | Stephen Keshi | 31 January 1962 (aged 20) | | | (Nigeria Football Federation) New Nigeria Bank |
| | DF | Charles Yantchio | | | | (Nigeria Football Federation) |
| | MF | Mudashiru Lawal | 8 June 1954 (aged 27) | | | (Nigeria Football Federation) Shooting Stars F.C. |
| 10 | MF | Henry Nwosu | 14 June 1963 (aged 18) | | | (Nigeria Football Federation) New Nigeria Bank |
| | MF | Okey Isima | 24 August 1956 (aged 25) | | | (Nigeria Football Federation) Enugu Rangers |
| | MF | Sylvanus Okpala | 3 September 1961 (aged 20) | | | (Nigeria Football Federation) Enugu Rangers |
| | MF | Felix Owolabi | 24 January 1956 (aged 26) | | | (Nigeria Football Federation) Shooting Stars F.C. |
| 9 | FW | Emmanuel Osigwe | 6 April 1952 (aged 29) | | | (Nigeria Football Federation) Enugu Rangers |
| 20 | FW | Richard Owubokiri | 16 June 1961 (aged 20) | | | (Nigeria Football Federation) ACB Lagos |
| | FW | Adok Adelabu | | | | (Nigeria Football Federation) Shooting Stars F.C. |
| | MF | Anthony Orji | | | | (Nigeria Football Federation) Enugu Rangers |
| | FW | Fatai Yekini | | | | (Nigeria Football Federation) JIB Strikers FC |

=== Zambia ===
Coach: (Romania) Ted Dumitru replaced by (Socialist Federal Republic of Yugoslavia) Ante Bušelić

| No. | Pos. | Player | Date of birth (age) | Caps | Goals | Club |
|---|---|---|---|---|---|---|
| | GK | Michael Bwalya | | | | (Football Association of Zambia) Green Buffaloes |
| | GK | Ghost Mulenga | 6 January 1954 (aged 28) | | | (Football Association of Zambia) Red Arrows |
| | GK | Emmanuel Mwape | 6 January 1950 (aged 32) | | | (Football Association of Zambia) Rhokana United |
| | DF | Jones Chilengi | 30 January 1955 (aged 27) | | | (Football Association of Zambia) Green Buffaloes |
| | DF | Kaiser Kalambo | 6 June 1953 (aged 28) | | | (Football Association of Zambia) Ndola United |
| | DF | Milton Muke | 10 June 1951 (aged 30) | | | (Football Association of Zambia) Green Buffaloes |
| | DF | Emmy Musonda | 1957 | | | (Football Association of Zambia) Green Buffaloes |
| | DF | Michael Musonda | | | | (Football Association of Zambia) Power Dynamos |
| | MF | Alex Chola | 6 June 1956 (aged 25) | | | (Football Association of Zambia) Power Dynamos |
| | MF | Aaron Njovu | | | | (Football Association of Zambia) Red Arrows |
| | MF | Willie Phiri | 3 June 1953 (aged 28) | | | (Football Association of Zambia) Nchanga Rangers |
| | MF | Jericho Shinde | 20 December 1959 (aged 22) | | | (Football Association of Zambia) Rhokana United |
| | FW | Jack Chanda | 16 June 1958 (aged 23) | | | (Football Association of Zambia) Roan United |
| | FW | Fanny Hangunyu | | | | (Football Association of Zambia) Red Arrows |
| | FW | Peter Kaumba | 31 March 1958 (aged 23) | | | (Football Association of Zambia) Power Dynamos |
| | FW | Ashious Melu | 6 June 1957 (aged 24) | | | (Football Association of Zambia) Mufulira Wanderers |
| | FW | Patrick Phiri | 3 May 1956 (aged 25) | | | (Football Association of Zambia) Red Arrows |
| | FW | Pele Kaimana | | | | (Football Association of Zambia) Green Buffaloes |
| | DF | John Kalusa | | | | (Football Association of Zambia) Rhokana United |
| | MF | Chris Kaoma | 28 August 1955 (aged 26) | | | (Football Association of Zambia) Green Buffaloes |
| | FW | Godfrey Munshya | | | | (Football Association of Zambia) Kabwe Warriors |
| | DF | Fabiano Mwaba | | | | (Football Association of Zambia) Kabwe United |
