= 1979 UEFA European Under-18 Championship squads =

Player listings in youth football competition

Players in bold have later been capped at full international level.

== Group A ==
=== Belgium ===
Head coach:

No.	Pos.	Player	Date of birth (age)	Caps	Club
	GK	**Gilbert Bodart**	2 September 1960 (aged 18)		(Belgium) Standard Liège
	GK	Peter Kerremans	28 February 1961 (aged 18)		(Belgium) K Boom FC
	DF	Danny Bonne	18 August 1960 (aged 18)		(Belgium) Royal Antwerp FC
	DF	Christ Goossens			
	DF	Francis Goris	1 November 1960 (aged 18)		(Belgium) Royal Antwerp FC
	DF	Ludo Keytsma	18 March 1962 (aged 17)		(Belgium) KSK Tongres
	DF	Michael Lambert			
	DF	Filip Meesens	17 November 1960 (aged 18)		(Belgium) Cercle Brugge
	DF	**Leo Van der Elst**	7 January 1962 (aged 17)		(Belgium) Royal Antwerp FC
	MF	**Geert Broeckaert**	15 November 1960 (aged 18)		(Belgium) Cercle Brugge
	MF	Dirk Fluyt	8 August 1961 (aged 17)		(Belgium) RSC Anderlecht
	MF	Bernard Habrant	23 September 1960 (aged 18)		(Belgium) RFC de Liège
	MF	Gunter van Eyck	19 December 1960 (aged 18)		(Belgium) Royal Antwerp FC
	FW	**Peter Crève**	17 August 1961 (aged 17)		(Belgium) AS Oostende
	FW	Didier Electeur	7 September 1960 (aged 18)		(Belgium) RSC Anderlecht
	FW	Benny van Rijkel	19 April 1961 (aged 18)		(Belgium) VV St. Truiden

=== France ===
Head coach:

No.	Pos.	Player	Date of birth (age)	Caps	Goals	Club
	GK	Marc Lévy	7 August 1961 (aged 17)			(French Football Federation) Olympique de Marseille
	GK	Stéphane d'Angelo	10 March 1961 (aged 18)			(French Football Federation) FC Metz
	DF	José Anigo	15 April 1961 (aged 18)			(French Football Federation) Olympique de Marseille
	DF	Didier Heyman	13 May 1961 (aged 18)			(French Football Federation) Angers SCO
	DF	Christian Zajaczkowski	16 February 1961 (aged 18)			(French Football Federation) LB Châteauroux
	DF	Jacky Bonnevay	1 June 1961 (aged 17)			(French Football Federation) FC Sochaux-Montbéliard
	DF	Jacques Lopez	24 April 1961 (aged 18)			(French Football Federation) Olympique de Marseille
	DF	**William Ayache**	10 January 1961 (aged 18)			(French Football Federation) FC Nantes
	MF	Louis Marcialis	23 June 1961 (aged 17)			(French Football Federation) SC Bastia
	MF	**Jean-Claude Lemoult**	28 August 1960 (aged 18)			(French Football Federation) Paris Saint-Germain F.C.
	MF	**Dominique Bijotat**	3 January 1961 (aged 18)			(French Football Federation) AS Monaco
	MF	**José Touré**	24 April 1961 (aged 18)			(French Football Federation) FC Nantes
	MF	Stéphane Plancque	6 January 1961 (aged 18)			(French Football Federation) Lille OSC
	FW	**Yannick Stopyra**	9 January 1961 (aged 18)			(French Football Federation) FC Sochaux-Montbéliard
	FW	**Gérard Buscher**	5 November 1960 (aged 18)			(French Football Federation) OGC Nice
	FW	Laurent Paganelli	22 October 1962 (aged 16)			(French Football Federation) AS Saint-Étienne

=== Netherlands ===
Head coach: Ger Block

No.	Pos.	Player	Date of birth (age)	Caps	Club
	GK	Jos Strijkers	1 April 1961 (aged 18)		(Netherlands) VV Urmondia
	GK	Peter van der Zwan	28 January 1961 (aged 18)		(Netherlands) UVS
	DF	Aad Bergenhenegouwen	11 April 1961 (aged 18)		(Netherlands) ADO Den Haag
	DF	Marco de Vroedt	18 October 1961 (aged 17)		(Netherlands) ADO Den Haag
	DF	Jan van den Akker	10 August 1960 (aged 18)		(Netherlands) FC Utrecht
	DF	Richard van Meer	19 September 1960 (aged 18)		(Netherlands) AZ '67
	DF	Robert Verbeeck	26 July 1961 (aged 17)		(Netherlands) Sparta Rotterdam
	MF	Aad Andriesen	13 December 1960 (aged 18)		(Netherlands) Sparta Rotterdam
	MF	**Ruud Gullit**	1 September 1962 (aged 16)		(Netherlands) HFC Haarlem
	MF	Marcel van den Blom	12 March 1961 (aged 18)		(Netherlands) UVS
	MF	Paul van den Blom	12 March 1961 (aged 18)		(Netherlands) UVS
	MF	Rene van Delft	1 September 1960 (aged 18)		(Netherlands) ADO Den Haag
	FW	John Holshuijsen	28 October 1961 (aged 17)		(Netherlands) Ajax
	FW	Roger Raeven	10 December 1960 (aged 18)		(Netherlands) Roda RJ
	FW	Rick Talan	3 November 1960 (aged 18)		(Netherlands) AZ '67
	FW	Johnny Vonk	17 July 1961 (aged 17)		(Netherlands) Fortuna Sittard

=== Switzerland ===
Head coach:

No.	Pos.	Player	Date of birth (age)	Caps	Club
	GK	Beat Grossglauser			(Switzerland) Young Boys
	GK	Beat Siegenthaler	26 February 1961 (aged 18)		(Switzerland) Young Boys
	DF	Jean-Daniel Balet	1 January 1961 (aged 18)		(Switzerland) FC Sion
	DF	Stéphane Forestier	17 October 1960 (aged 18)		(Switzerland) FC Vevey
	DF	Roland Klein			(Switzerland) FC Winterthur
	DF	Ivo Müller			(Switzerland) Grasshopper
	DF	René Zingg	26 November 1961 (aged 17)		(Switzerland) FC Birsfelden
	MF	Gilbert Castella	6 November 1961 (aged 17)		(Switzerland) CS Chênois
	MF	**Alain Geiger**	5 November 1960 (aged 18)		(Switzerland) FC Sion
	MF	**Marcel Koller**	11 November 1960 (aged 18)		(Switzerland) Grasshopper
	MF	Philippe Perret	17 October 1961 (aged 17)		(Switzerland) Neuchâtel Xamax
	FW	Rino Capaldo	6 December 1961 (aged 17)		(Switzerland) FC Frauenfeld
	FW	**Christian Matthey**	30 September 1961 (aged 17)		(Switzerland) FC Vevey
	FW	Christophe Saunier	12 October 1960 (aged 18)		(Switzerland) Aurore Biel
	FW	Lorenzo Taddei	10 September 1961 (aged 17)		(Switzerland) SC Derendingen
	FW	André Villoz	5 August 1961 (aged 17)		(Switzerland) FC Bulle

== Group B ==
=== Czechoslovakia ===
Head coach:

=== England ===
Head coach:

No.	Pos.	Player	Date of birth (age)	Caps	Goals	Club
	GK	John Lukic	11 December 1960 (aged 18)			(The Football Association) Leeds United F.C.
	GK	Alan Knight	3 June 1961 (aged 17)			(The Football Association) Portsmouth F.C.
	DF	Steve Bruce	31 December 1960 (aged 18)			(The Football Association) Gillingham F.C.
	DF	Brendan Ormsby	1 October 1960 (aged 18)			(The Football Association) Aston Villa F.C.
	DF	Neil Banfield	20 January 1962 (aged 17)			(The Football Association) Crystal Palace F.C.
	DF	Mark Dennis	2 May 1961 (aged 18)			(The Football Association) Birmingham City F.C.
	MF	Paul Allen	28 August 1962 (aged 16)			(The Football Association) West Ham United F.C.
	MF	Steve MacKenzie	23 November 1961 (aged 17)			(The Football Association) Crystal Palace F.C.
	MF	Mark Proctor	30 January 1961 (aged 18)			(The Football Association) Middlesbrough F.C.
	MF	Brian McDermott	8 April 1961 (aged 18)			(The Football Association) Arsenal F.C.
	MF	Steven Burke	29 September 1960 (aged 18)			(The Football Association) Nottingham Forest F.C.
	FW	David Buchanan	23 June 1962 (aged 16)			(The Football Association) Leicester City F.C.
	FW	Gary Shaw	21 January 1961 (aged 18)			(The Football Association) Aston Villa F.C.
	FW	**Clive Allen**	20 May 1961 (aged 18)			(The Football Association) Queens Park Rangers F.C.

=== West Germany ===
Head coach:Dietrich Weise

No.	Pos.	Player	Date of birth (age)	Caps	Goals	Club
	GK	Thomas Henrichs	15 March 1963 (aged 16)			(German Football Association) FSV Moselkern
	GK	Peter Wienen	13 December 1960 (aged 18)			(German Football Association) Borussia Mönchengladbach
	DF	Winfried Geier	23 August 1960 (aged 18)			(German Football Association) FC Schalke 04
	DF	Michael Geiger	27 September 1960 (aged 18)			(German Football Association) Eintracht Braunschweig
	DF	**Jonny Otten**	20 January 1962 (aged 17)			(German Football Association) SV Werder Bremen
	DF	Thomas Siewert	4 November 1961 (aged 17)			(German Football Association) FC Schalke 04
	DF	Norbert Schlegel	9 March 1961 (aged 18)			(German Football Association) 1. FC Nürnberg
	MF	Markus Mohren	11 March 1961 (aged 18)			(German Football Association) Borussia Mönchengladbach
	MF	Joachim Müller	25 March 1961 (aged 18)			(German Football Association) Stuttgarter Kickers
	MF	Theo Schneider	23 August 1960 (aged 18)			(German Football Association) Borussia Dortmund
	MF	**Stephan Engels**	6 September 1960 (aged 18)			(German Football Association) 1. FC Köln
	MF	Thomas Brunner	10 August 1962 (aged 16)			(German Football Association) 1. FC Nürnberg
	MF	**Lothar Matthäus**	21 March 1961 (aged 18)			(German Football Association) 1. FC Herzogenaurach
	FW	Dieter Wohlfarth	4 January 1961 (aged 18)			(German Football Association) VfB Stuttgart
	FW	Fred Schaub	28 August 1960 (aged 18)			(German Football Association) Eintracht Frankfurt
	FW	Torsten Schlumberger	29 October 1960 (aged 18)			(German Football Association) Hamburger SV

=== Malta ===
Head coach:John Calleja

GK Gino Gauci GK CARMEL BLUNDELL DF ALEX MUSCAT DF PAUL CURMI DF MARCO PORTELLI DF ALEX AZZOPARDI DF VINCE DARMANIN DF ALEX DEBONO DF EUGENIO HILI MF TONY ALAMANGO MF STEPHEN PANDOLFINO MF JOHN CARUANA FW SILVIO DEMANUELE FW PAUL ZAMMIT FW NOEL ATTARD FW JOSEPH GERADA

== Group C ==
=== Austria ===
Head coach:

No.	Pos.	Player	Date of birth (age)	Caps	Goals	Club
	GK	Kurt Machhammer	29 September 1961 (aged 17)			(Austrian Football Association) Austria Wien
	GK	Gottfried Angerer	4 March 1961 (aged 18)			(Austrian Football Association) Alpine Donawitz
	DF	Hans-Peter Buchleitner	24 November 1960 (aged 18)			(Austrian Football Association) ATSV Wolfsberg
	DF	Peter Schneider	6 August 1961 (aged 17)			(Austrian Football Association) VOEST Linz
	DF	**Gerald Messlender**	1 October 1961 (aged 17)			(Austrian Football Association) Admira Wacker Wien
	DF	Kurt Wolfsbauer	21 August 1960 (aged 18)			(Austrian Football Association) First Vienna FC
	DF	**Leo Lainer**	10 September 1960 (aged 18)			(Austrian Football Association) Admira Wacker Wien
	MF	Leopold Mayerhofer	30 October 1961 (aged 17)			(Austrian Football Association) SC Eisenstadt
	MF	Georg Zellhofer	25 August 1960 (aged 18)			(Austrian Football Association) SV Austria Salzburg
	MF	Klaus Spirk	18 December 1960 (aged 18)			(Austrian Football Association) Grazer AK
	MF	Peter Sallmayer	21 May 1961 (aged 18)			(Austrian Football Association) Schwarz-Weiß Bregenz
	MF	Thomas Pfeiler	5 November 1960 (aged 18)			(Austrian Football Association) Austria Wien
	MF	Ewald Markoutz	1 September 1960 (aged 18)			(Austrian Football Association) SV Sankt Veit
	FW	**Christian Keglevits**	29 January 1961 (aged 18)			(Austrian Football Association) SC Eisenstadt
	FW	Wilhelm Bohusek	8 December 1960 (aged 18)			(Austrian Football Association) First Vienna FC
	FW	Anton Schlögl	8 March 1961 (aged 18)			(Austrian Football Association) SC Eisenstadt

=== Hungary ===
Head coach:

No.	Pos.	Player	Date of birth (age)	Caps	Goals	Club
	GK	Miklós Józsa	30 June 1961 (aged 17)			(Hungarian Football Federation) Ferencvárosi TC
	DF	Dávid Babcsán				
	DF	**Antal Róth**	14 September 1960 (aged 18)			(Hungarian Football Federation) Pécsi MFC
	DF	Mátyás Jurácsik	1 October 1960 (aged 18)			(Hungarian Football Federation) Újpest Dózsa
	DF	Róbert Horváth	29 March 1962 (aged 17)			(Hungarian Football Federation) Ferencvárosi TC
	DF	**József Nagy**	21 October 1960 (aged 18)			(Hungarian Football Federation) Szombathelyi Haladás
	MF	Gábor Sikesdi	29 August 1960 (aged 18)			(Hungarian Football Federation) Banyasz Tatabánya
	MF	István Pandúr	10 August 1960 (aged 18)			(Hungarian Football Federation) Budapest Honvéd FC
	MF	György Szeibert	29 December 1960 (aged 18)			(Hungarian Football Federation) VSC Budapesti
	MF	Miklós Kökény	2 May 1961 (aged 18)			
	FW	Róbert Koch	19 December 1961 (aged 17)			(Hungarian Football Federation) Ferencvárosi TC
	FW	**Gábor Pölöskei**	10 November 1961 (aged 17)			(Hungarian Football Federation) Raba ETO Győr
	FW	Sándor Murai	22 March 1961 (aged 18)			(Hungarian Football Federation) Kaposvári Rákóczi

=== Norway ===
Head coach:

No.	Pos.	Player	Date of birth (age)	Caps	Club
	GK	**Ola By Rise**	14 November 1960 (aged 18)		(Norway) Rosenborg
	GK	Hans Petter Olsen			
	DF	Jo Kristoffer Bergsvand	25 October 1960 (aged 18)		(Norway) Vålerenga IF
	DF	**Knut Thorbjorn Eggen**	1 November 1960 (aged 18)		(Norway) Rosenborg
	DF	Rune Robert Hagen			
	DF	Bjørn Anders Johnsen			
	DF	Knut Røssevold			
	MF	Tor Arne Granerud	2 September 1961 (aged 17)		(Norway) Moss
	MF	Rolf Vegard Haugenes			
	MF	**Øivind Husby**	3 August 1960 (aged 18)		(Norway) Rosenborg
	MF	Geir Morten Ramsøy			
	MF	Harald Røed			
	FW	Pal Fjeldstad	11 February 1962 (aged 17)		(Norway) Brann
	FW	**Nils Ove Hellvik**	25 July 1962 (aged 16)		(Norway) Bryne
	FW	**Kjetil Osvold**	5 June 1961 (aged 17)		(Norway) Start
	FW	Tor Bjørn Sletten	5 January 1961 (aged 18)		

=== Yugoslavia ===
Head coach: Stevan Vilotić

No.	Pos.	Player	Date of birth (age)	Caps	Club
	GK	**Ivan Pudar**	16 August 1961 (aged 17)		(Socialist Federal Republic of Yugoslavia) Hajduk Split
	DF	**Vlado Čapljić**	22 March 1962 (aged 17)		(Socialist Federal Republic of Yugoslavia) Željezničar
	DF	**Boško Đurovski**	28 December 1961 (aged 17)		(Socialist Federal Republic of Yugoslavia) Red Star Belgrade
	DF	Adnan Dzanic			
	DF	Luca Lazic			
	MF	**Mehmed Baždarević**	28 September 1960 (aged 18)		(Socialist Federal Republic of Yugoslavia) Željezničar
	MF	Mladen Bogdanović	3 October 1960 (aged 18)		(Socialist Federal Republic of Yugoslavia) Hajduk Split
	MF	**Ivan Gudelj**	21 September 1960 (aged 18)		(Socialist Federal Republic of Yugoslavia) Hajduk Split
	MF	Radomir Radulović	14 August 1960 (aged 18)		(Socialist Federal Republic of Yugoslavia) Partizan
	FW	Zdravko Čakalić	16 August 1960 (aged 18)		(Socialist Federal Republic of Yugoslavia) Red Star Belgrade
	FW	Malinkovic			
	FW	Senat Merdanovic	7 August 1961 (aged 17)		(Socialist Federal Republic of Yugoslavia) FK Sarajevo
	FW	Stojance Zlatanovski	29 November 1960 (aged 18)		(Socialist Federal Republic of Yugoslavia) FK Vardar Skopje

== Group D ==
=== Bulgaria ===
Head coach: Petkow

No.	Pos.	Player	Date of birth (age)	Caps	Club
	GK	G Tenew			(Bulgaria) Trakia Plovdiv
	DF	**Blagoy Blangev**	4 November 1960 (aged 18)		(Bulgaria) Trakia Plovdiv
	DF	V Davidkov			(Bulgaria) Pirin Blagoevgrad
	DF	**Georgi Georgiev**	10 January 1963 (aged 16)		(Bulgaria) Maritsa Plovdiv
	DF	Valery Grekov	13 October 1961 (aged 17)		(Bulgaria) Levski Sofia
	MF	**Krasimir Bezinski**	29 June 1961 (aged 17)		(Bulgaria) Pirin Blagoevgrad
	MF	K Kostov			(Bulgaria) Trakia Plovdiv
	MF	I Naidenov			(Bulgaria) Maritsa Plovdiv
	MF	**Ayan Sadakov**	29 September 1961 (aged 17)		(Bulgaria) Lokomotiv Plovdiv
	FW	**Vasil Dragolov**	17 August 1962 (aged 16)		(Bulgaria) Hebar Pazardzhik
	FW	**Eduard Eranosyan**	8 February 1961 (aged 18)		(Bulgaria) Lokomotiv Plovdiv
	FW	I Ivanov			
	FW	**Petar Kurdov**	13 March 1961 (aged 18)		(Bulgaria) Trakia Plovdiv

=== Denmark ===
Head coach:

=== Poland ===
Head coach: (Poland) Henryk Apostel

No.	Pos.	Player	Date of birth (age)	Caps	Goals	Club
	GK	Ryszard Ługowski	20 July 1961 (aged 17)			(Polish Football Association) Chemik Bydgoszcz
	GK	Dariusz Opolski	23 September 1961 (aged 17)			(Polish Football Association) Motor Lublin
	GK	Janusz Przybyłka	11 April 1962 (aged 17)			(Polish Football Association) Polonia Bytom
	DF	Antoni Kot	10 August 1960 (aged 18)			(Polish Football Association) Hutnik Kraków
	DF	**Piotr Skrobowski**	16 October 1961 (aged 17)			(Polish Football Association) Wisła Kraków
	DF	Bogusław Skiba	16 November 1960 (aged 18)			(Polish Football Association) Stal Mielec
	DF	Marian Tomczyk	7 March 1961 (aged 18)			(Polish Football Association) Ruch Chorzów
	DF	Andrzej Gruszka	26 February 1961 (aged 18)			(Polish Football Association) Szombierki Bytom
	DF	Edward Tyburski	18 October 1960 (aged 18)			(Polish Football Association) Siarka Tarnobrzeg
	MF	**Mirosław Pękala**	15 October 1961 (aged 17)			(Polish Football Association) Śląsk Wrocław
	MF	Jacek Ratajczyk	11 January 1961 (aged 18)			(Polish Football Association) ŁKS Łódź
	MF	Jarosław Biernat	6 September 1960 (aged 18)			(Polish Football Association) Pogoń Szczecin
	MF	Dariusz Krupa	23 April 1961 (aged 18)			(Polish Football Association) Pogoń Szczecin
	FW	Janusz Turowski	7 February 1961 (aged 18)			(Polish Football Association) Pogoń Szczecin
	FW	Waldemar Majcher	11 March 1961 (aged 18)			(Polish Football Association) Lechia Gdańsk
	FW	**Jarosław Nowicki**	11 January 1961 (aged 18)			(Polish Football Association) Zawisza Bydgoszcz
	FW	Zbigniew Żurek	14 March 1961 (aged 18)			(Polish Football Association) Górnik Zabrze

=== Scotland ===
Head coach:
