= Biri =

Biri or BIRI may refer to:

== Places ==
- Biri, Norway, a village in Gjøvik municipality in Innlandet county, Norway
- Biri Municipality, a former municipality in the old Oppland county, Norway
- Biri, Hungary, a village in Hungary
- Biri, Northern Samar, a municipality in the Philippines
- Biri, India, a village in Jaunpur, India
- Block Island, an island town in Rhode Island, (abbrev. BIRI)
- Biri River, a river in South Sudan

== People ==
- Biri (lyricist), Ornella Ferrari (1909–1983)
- Kings of the Sayfawa dynasty of the Kanem-Bornu Empire:
  - Bir I of Kanem (1150–1176)
  - Bir II of Kanem (1242–1262)
- Biri (footballer), or Antonio Vargas Quijada, Spanish football player
- Biri Biri, or Alhaji Momodo Nije, Gambian football player
- Biria people

== Other ==
- Biri language, an Australian Aboriginal language of Queensland
  - Biria people, also spelt Biri
- Biri, an enemy creature in The Legend of Zelda
- Beedi or Biri, a thin, Indian cigarette
- Brain Injury Research Institute, a center for the study of traumatic brain injuries and prevention
