= Hugo Caballero =

Hugo Caballero may refer to:

- Hugo Caballero (footballer, born 1958), Paraguayan football defender
- Hugo Caballero (footballer, born 1974), Honduran football goalkeeper
