= Satoshi Yamaguchi (footballer, born 1959) =

Japanese footballer

Satoshi Yamaguchi 山口 悟
Personal information
- Full name: Satoshi Yamaguchi
- Date of birth: August 1, 1959 (age 67)
- Place of birth: Oita, Japan
- Height: 1.83 m (6 ft 0 in)
- Position: Goalkeeper

Youth career
- 1975–1977: Oita Technical High School

Senior career*
Years	Team	Apps	(Gls)
1978–1984	Mitsubishi Motors	0	(0)
Total		0	(0)

International career
1981	Japan	1	(0)
Medal record
Mitsubishi Motors
Winner	Japan Soccer League	1978
Winner	Japan Soccer League	1982
Winner	JSL Cup	1978
Winner	JSL Cup	1981
Winner	Emperor's Cup	1978
Winner	Emperor's Cup	1980
Runner-up	Emperor's Cup	1979
- * Club domestic league appearances and goals

Satoshi Yamaguchi (山口 悟, Yamaguchi Satoshi; born August 1, 1959) is a former Japanese football player. He played for Japan national team.

== Club career ==
Yamaguchi was born in Oita Prefecture on August 1, 1959. After graduating from high school, he joined Mitsubishi Motors in 1978. However he did not play in the game, as he was the team's reserve goalkeeper behind Japan national team player Mitsuhisa Taguchi. He retired in 1984. Eventually he could not play in the game.

== National team career ==
In August 1979, Yamaguchi was selected Japan U-20 national team for 1979 World Youth Championship. However, he did not compete, as he was the team's reserve goalkeeper behind Yasuhito Suzuki. In February 1981, although he did not play at his club, he was selected Japan national team because Japan's manager Saburo Kawabuchi actively appointed young players. On February 19, Yamaguchi debuted for Japan national team against Singapore.

== Club statistics ==
Club performance			League	
Season	Club	League	Apps	Goals
Japan			League	
1978	Mitsubishi Motors	JSL Division 1	0	0
1979	Mitsubishi Motors	JSL Division 1	0	0
1980	Mitsubishi Motors	JSL Division 1	0	0
1981	Mitsubishi Motors	JSL Division 1	0	0
1982	Mitsubishi Motors	JSL Division 1	0	0
1983	Mitsubishi Motors	JSL Division 1	0	0
1984	Mitsubishi Motors	JSL Division 1	0	0
Total			0	0

== National team statistics ==
Japan national team
Year	Apps	Goals
1981	1	0
Total	1	0
