= Toshihiko Okimune =

Japanese footballer

Toshihiko Okimune 沖宗 敏彦
Personal information
- Full name: Toshihiko Okimune
- Date of birth: September 7, 1959 (age 67)
- Place of birth: Hiroshima, Japan
- Position: Defender

Youth career
- 1975–1977: Hiroshima Technical High School

Senior career*
Years	Team	Apps	(Gls)
1978–????	Fujitsu		

International career
1979	Japan U-20	3	(0)
1981	Japan	2	(0)
- * Club domestic league appearances and goals

Toshihiko Okimune (沖宗 敏彦, Okimune Toshihiko; born September 7, 1959) is a former Japanese football player. He played for Japan national team.

== Club career ==
Okimune was born in Hiroshima Prefecture on September 7, 1959. After graduating from high school, he joined Japan Soccer League Division 1 club Kawasaki Frontale in 1978. However, in first season, the club was relegated to Division 2.

== National team career ==
In August 1979, Okimune was selected Japan U-20 national team for 1979 World Youth Championship. He played 3 games. On August 30, 1981, he debuted for Japan national team against Malaysia. He played 2 games for Japan in 1981.

== National team statistics ==
Japan national team
Year	Apps	Goals
1981	2	0
Total	2	0
