= Joseph Enanga =

Cameroonian footballer (born 1958)

Personal information
- Date of birth: 28 August 1958 (age 68)
- Place of birth: Cameroon
- Height: 1.81 m (5 ft 11 in)
- Position: Midfielder

Senior career*
Years	Team	Apps	(Gls)
1979–1980	Union Douala		
1980–1982	Caïman Douala		
1982–1988	CO Saint-Dizier		

International career
- Cameroon
- * Club domestic league appearances and goals

Joseph Enanga (born 28 August 1958) is a Cameroonian football midfielder who played for Cameroon in the 1982 FIFA World Cup. He also played for Union Douala.
