= Branko Žutić =

Yugoslav footballer

Personal information
- Full name: Branko Žutić
- Date of birth: 1932
- Place of birth: Delčevo, Yugoslavia
- Date of death: 2003 (aged 70–71)
- Place of death: Mladenovac, Serbia and Montenegro

Managerial career
- Years: Team
- Mladenovac
- Pelister
- Mladenovac
- Asante Kotoko
- Togo
- Nigeria
- 1980–1982: Cameroon
- Canon Yaoundé
- Mladenovac

Branko Žutić (1932 – 2003) was a Yugoslavian football coach active in Africa. He managed the Cameroon national team between 1980 and 1982.
