= Guillermo Padrón =

Mexican footballer and manager (born 1959)

Personal information
- Full name: Guillermo Padrón Montiel
- Date of birth: 2 November 1959 (age 66)
- Place of birth: Mexico City, Mexico
- Position: Midfielder

Senior career*
| Years | Team | Apps | (Gls) |
| 1977–1981 | América | 14 | (1) |
| 1981–1982 | Atlas | 19 | (0) |
| 1983–1985 | Monarcas Morelia | 39 | (0) |
| 1986–1987 | León | 19 | (0) |

Managerial career
- 2013–2018: Tiburones Rojos de Veracruz Reserves and Academy
- * Club domestic league appearances and goals

Guillermo Padrón Montiel (born November 2, 1959) is a Mexican football manager and former player.

After he retired from playing, Padrón became a football coach. He led Veracruz's under-20 side to the semifinals of the 2017 Liga MX youth league.
