= Brent Barling =

Canadian soccer player (born 1961)

Personal information
- Date of birth: April 28, 1961 (age 65)
- Height: 5 ft 10 in (1.78 m)
- Position: Forward

Youth career
- Vancouver Whitecaps

Senior career*
Years	Team	Apps	(Gls)
1980–1982	Vancouver Whitecaps	2	(1)
1981–1982	Vancouver Whitecaps (indoor)	16	(8)
Total		18	(9)

International career
1979	Canada U20	1	(0)
- * Club domestic league appearances and goals

Brent Barling (born April 28, 1961) is a former Canadian soccer player who played for Vancouver Whitecaps in the NASL.

== Club career ==
Barling spent his whole career with the Vancouver Whitecaps.

== International career ==
Barling played for the Canada men's national under-20 soccer team, making one appearance at the 1979 FIFA World Youth Championship.

== Career statistics ==
=== Club ===
Club	Season	League			Cup		Other		Total	
Club	Season	Division	Apps	Goals	Apps	Goals	Apps	Goals	Apps	Goals
Vancouver Whitecaps	1980	NASL	1	1	0	0	0	0	1	1
Vancouver Whitecaps	1981	NASL	1	0	0	0	0	0	1	0
Vancouver Whitecaps	1982	NASL	0	0	0	0	0	0	0	0
Vancouver Whitecaps	Total		2	1	0	0	0	0	2	1
Vancouver Whitecaps (indoor)	1981–82	NASL Indoors	16	8	0	0	0	0	16	8
Career total			18	9	0	0	0	0	18	9
