= Danny Lenarduzzi =

Canadian soccer player

Personal information
- Date of birth: August 31, 1959 (age 67)
- Height: 6 ft 1 in (1.85 m)
- Position: Defender

Senior career*
Years	Team	Apps	(Gls)
1978	Edmonton Black Gold		
1978–1980	Vancouver Whitecaps	9	(0)
1980–1981	Vancouver Whitecaps (indoor)	16	(2)
1981–1982	Toronto Blizzard (indoor)	13	(0)
1983	Toronto Nationals		
1985	Vancouver Columbus Italia		

International career
1976–1979	Canada U20	11	(1)
- * Club domestic league appearances and goals

Danny Lenarduzzi (born August 31, 1959) is a former Canadian soccer player who played for Vancouver Whitecaps in the NASL.

== International career ==
Lenarduzzi played for the Canada men's national under-20 soccer team, making three appearances at the 1979 FIFA World Youth Championship.

== Personal life ==
Lenarduzzi is the brother of fellow former professional footballers Bob and Sam Lenarduzzi.

== Career statistics ==
=== Club ===
Club	Season	League			Cup		Other		Total	
Club	Season	Division	Apps	Goals	Apps	Goals	Apps	Goals	Apps	Goals
Vancouver Whitecaps	1978	NASL	2	0	0	0	0	0	2	0
Vancouver Whitecaps	1979	NASL	6	0	0	0	0	0	6	0
Vancouver Whitecaps	1980	NASL	1	0	0	0	0	0	1	0
Vancouver Whitecaps	Total		9	0	0	0	0	0	9	0
Vancouver Whitecaps (indoor)	1989–81	NASL Indoors	16	2	0	0	0	0	16	2
Toronto Blizzard (indoor)	1981–82	NASL Indoors	13	0	0	0	0	0	13	0
Career total			38	2	0	0	0	0	38	2
