= Nelson Alaguich =

Uruguayan footballer (born 1959)

Nelson Alaguich (born 20 August 1959) is a Uruguayan former footballer who last played as a defender for Atlas.

== Early life ==
Alaguich has been nicknamed "Yeye".

== Career ==
Alaguich played for Mexican side Atlas.

== Style of play ==
Alaguich has operated as a defender and midfielder.

== Personal life ==
After retiring from professional football, Alaguich worked as a player representative.
