= Carlos César Olmedo =

Paraguayan footballer (born 1960)

Personal information
- Full name: Carlos César Olmedo Pérez
- Date of birth: 18 June 1960 (age 66)
- Place of birth: Areguá, Paraguay
- Height: 1.78 m (5 ft 10 in)
- Position: Right midfielder

Senior career*
| Years | Team | Apps | (Gls) |
| 1976–1980 | Luqueño | | |
| 1980–1982 | Atletas Campesinos | | |
| 1982 | CF Monterrey | | |
| 1982–1983 | Luqueño | | |
| 1984–1985 | Cerro Porteño | | |
| 1986 | General Caballero ZC | | |
| 1987 | Luqueño | | |
| 1988-1990 | River Plate | | |
| 1990–1993 | 12 de Octubre | | |
| 1993–1996 | 24 de Setiembre | | |

International career
| 1979 | Paraguay U20 | | |
| 1983 | Paraguay | 11 | (1) |
- * Club domestic league appearances and goals

Carlos César Olmedo Pérez (born 18 June 1960) is a Paraguayan former professional footballer who played as a right midfielder. He played in Paraguay and México most importantly in Luqueño, Cerro Porteño and Monterrey. Olmedo was a member of the Paraguayan squad that competed in the 1979 FIFA World Youth Championship and was also part of the Paraguay national team that participated in the 1983 Copa América.
