= Gaspard D'Alexis =

Haitian-Canadian soccer player (born 1960)

Personal information
- Date of birth: January 6, 1960 (age 66)
- Place of birth: Port-au-Prince, Haiti
- Height: 5 ft 9 in (1.75 m)
- Position: Defender

Youth career
- Inex Toronto

College career
Years	Team	Apps	(Gls)
- Plymouth State College

Senior career*
Years	Team	Apps	(Gls)
1988–1989	Montreal Supra	26	(0)
Total		26	(0)

International career
1979	Canada U20	1	(0)

Managerial career
- Laval Dynamites
- 2010: Haiti Women
- Haiti Women
- Omega SC Select
- Treasure Coast Dynamites
- * Club domestic league appearances and goals

Gaspard D'Alexis (born January 6, 1960) is a former soccer player who played for the Montreal Supra. Born in Haiti, he played for the Canada U20s.

== University ==
D'Alexis played soccer at the Plymouth State College, earning All-America honours in 1983.

== International career ==
D'Alexis played for the Canada men's national under-20 soccer team, making one appearance at the 1979 FIFA World Youth Championship.

== Coaching career ==
Following the end of his playing career, D'Alexis went on to forge a career in soccer coaching. He served as manager of Laval Dynamites until 2001, when he was replaced by Emmanuel Macagno.

In 2010, he was named head coach of the Haiti women's national football team. Despite his resignation in September of the same year, he appears to have returned to coach the team on at least one occasion.

He has also managed local women's and girl's teams in Canada.

== Career statistics ==
=== Club ===
Club	Season	League			Cup		Other		Total	
Club	Season	Division	Apps	Goals	Apps	Goals	Apps	Goals	Apps	Goals
Montreal Supra	1988	CSL	6	0	0	0	0	0	6	0
Montreal Supra	1989	CSL	20	0	0	0	0	0	20	0
Career total			26	0	0	0	0	0	26	0
