= Abdelhafid Bellabès =

Algerian footballer (born 1959)

Personal information
- Full name: Abdelhafid Bellabès
- Date of birth: November 4, 1959 (age 66)
- Place of birth: Oran, Algeria
- Height: 1.82 m (6 ft 0 in)
- Position: Defender

Youth career
- –: MC Oran

Senior career*
| Years | Team | Apps | (Gls) |
| 1978–1988 | MC Oran | – | (–) |

International career
| 1979 | Algeria U20 | – | (–) |
| 1983 | Algeria | 3 | (0) |
- * Club domestic league appearances and goals

Abdelhafid Bellabès (Arabic: عبد الحفيظ بلعباس; born November 4, 1959) is a former Algerian international football player. He played essentially for MC Oran. He took part in the 1979 FIFA World Youth Championship in Japan with Algeria U-20 team.

== Honours ==
=== Clubs ===
MC Oran

- Algerian Championship: Champion 1988; Runner-up 1985, 1987
- Algerian Cup: Winner 1984, 1985

=== National ===
- African Youth Championship: Winner 1979
- FIFA World Youth Championship: Quarter-final 1979
