= Biri, India =

Coordinates: 26°41′N 79°51′E

Biri is a village in Jaunpur, Uttar Pradesh, India.
