= Mohamed Saïd Amokrane =

Algerian footballer (born 1957)

Personal information
- Date of birth: 25 January 1957 (age 69)
- Place of birth: Algiers, Algeria
- Position: Forward

International career
Years	Team	Apps	(Gls)
1982	Algeria	4	(0)

Mohamed Saïd Amokrane (born 25 January 1957) is an Algerian footballer. He played in four matches for the Algeria national football team in 1982. He was also named in Algeria's squad for the 1982 African Cup of Nations tournament.
