= Jacques Lopez =

French footballer (born 1961)

Personal information
- Full name: Jacques Lopez
- Date of birth: April 27, 1961 (age 65)
- Place of birth: Marseille, France
- Height: 1.87 m (6 ft 1 1/2 in)
- Position: Defender

Senior career*
Years	Team	Apps	(Gls)
1979–1985	Marseille	126	(5)
1985–1987	Cannes	?	(?)
1987–1989	Dijon	?	(?)
1989–1991	Châteauroux	?	(?)
1991–1992	Chamois Niortais	28	(1)
- * Club domestic league appearances and goals

Jacques Lopez (born April 27, 1961) is a retired professional footballer. He played as a defender.
