= Rubén Rossi =

Argentine footballer (born 1973)

Personal information
- Full name: Rubén Darío Rossi
- Date of birth: 28 October 1973 (age 53)
- Place of birth: Santa Fe, Argentina
- Height: 1.87 m (6 ft 2 in)
- Position: Forward

Senior career*
| Years | Team | Apps | (Gls) |
| 1991–1996 | San Lorenzo | 84 | (5) |
| 1994 | → Daewoo Royals (loan) | 7 | (1) |
| 1996–1998 | Toulouse FC | 56 | (9) |
- * Club domestic league appearances and goals

Rubén Darío Rossi (born October 28, 1973), sometimes known as El Yaya, is an Argentine footballer who played as a forward.

== Club career ==
He played for Busan IPark of the South Korean K League, then known as Daewoo Royals.
