= Oscar Surián =

Paraguayan footballer (born 1959)

Personal information
- Full name: Óscar Cecilio Surián Roda
- Date of birth: 7 August 1959 (age 67)
- Place of birth: Asunción, Paraguay
- Height: 1.85 m (6 ft 1 in)
- Position: Centre back

Senior career*
Years	Team	Apps	(Gls)
1977–1990	Libertad		
1990–1992	Sport Colombia		
1992–1995	Atletico Colegiales		

International career^{‡}
1979	Paraguay U-20	1	(0)
1980-1983	Paraguay	14	(0)
- * Club domestic league appearances and goals as of ‡ National team caps and goals as of 29 July 2020

Óscar Cecilio Surián Roda (born 7 August 1959) is a Paraguayan former footballer, who played as a centre back. He played football most of his career with Libertad.

== International ==
Surián was a member of the Paraguay national U-20 squad that competed in the 1979 FIFA World Youth Championship and was also part of the Paraguay national football team that participated in the 1983 Copa América.
