= Gerald Messlender =

Austrian footballer (1961–2019)

Personal information
- Full name: Gerald Messlender
- Date of birth: 1 October 1961
- Place of birth: Baden, Austria
- Date of death: 20 June 2019 (aged 57)
- Place of death: Guntramsdorf, Austria
- Height: 1.94 m (6 ft 4 in)
- Position: Defender

Senior career*
Years	Team	Apps	(Gls)
1979–1986	Admira Wacker Wien	142	(15)
1986–1988	Tirol Innsbruck	34	(6)
1988–1994	Admira Wacker Wien	49	(5)
1994–1996	SC Austria Lustenau		
1996–1997	VSE St. Pölten	18	(1)

International career^{‡}
1982–1987	Austria	15	(0)
- * Club domestic league appearances and goals as of 24 October 2018 ‡ National team caps and goals as of 6 October 2009

Gerald Messlender (1 October 1961 – 20 June 2019) was an Austrian football defender. During his club career, Messlender played for Admira Wacker Wien, Tirol Innsbruck and SC Austria Lustenau. He also featured in the Austria squad for the 1982 FIFA World Cup in Spain.
