= Julián Coronel =

Paraguayan footballer (born 1958)

Personal information
- Full name: Julián Coronel Rosa
- Date of birth: 23 October 1958 (age 68)
- Place of birth: Paraguay
- Position: Goalkeeper

Youth career
- Independiente FBC

Senior career*
Years	Team	Apps	(Gls)
–1976	Independiente FBC		
1977–1986	Guaraní		
1986	Universidad Católica	8	(0)
1987–1988	Guaraní		
1989–1991	Olimpia		

International career
1979	Paraguay U20		
1986	Paraguay	1	(0)

Managerial career
- Deportivo Recoleta (gk coach)
- Deportivo Recoleta (youth)
- 2002: Deportivo Recoleta (caretaker)
- * Club domestic league appearances and goals

Julián Coronel Rosa (born 23 October 1958) is a Paraguayan former footballer, who played as a goalkeeper.

== Career ==
Coronel played his club football for Independiente F.B.C., Guaraní and Olimpia Asunción. With Independiente FBC, he won the 1975 Segunda de Ascenso, then the Paraguayan third level.

Abroad, Coronel had a stint with Chilean club Universidad Católica in 1986.

Coronel was a member of the Paraguayan squad that competed in the 1979 FIFA World Youth Championship and was also part of the Paraguay national football team that participated in the 1986 FIFA World Cup, where he was the third goalkeeper of the squad.

As a football coach, Coronel has worked for Deportivo Recoleta as a goalkeeping coach, coach of the under-15's and interim coach in 2002.
