= Mohamed Kheloufi =

Algerian footballer (born 1959)

Personal information
- Date of birth: 12 May 1959 (age 67)

International career
Years	Team	Apps	(Gls)
1982	Algeria	2	(0)

Mohamed Kheloufi (born 12 May 1959) is an Algerian former footballer. He played for the Algeria national football team in 1982 and was also named in the national squad for the 1982 African Cup of Nations.
