= Radomir Radulović =

Serbian footballer (born 1960)

Personal information
- Full name: Radomir Radulović
- Date of birth: 14 April 1960 (age 66)
- Place of birth: Jaša Tomić, FPR Yugoslavia
- Height: 5 ft 8 in (1.73 m)
- Position: Midfielder

Senior career*
Years	Team	Apps	(Gls)
1982–1985	Partizan	13	(0)
1986–1988	Istres	27	(5)

International career
1979	Yugoslavia U20		
- * Club domestic league appearances and goals

Radomir Radulović (Serbian Cyrillic: Радомир Радуловић; born April 14, 1960) is a retired Serbian footballer.
