= Biri (footballer) =

Spanish footballer

Personal information
- Full name: Antonio Vargas Quijada
- Date of birth: 14 September 1959 (age 67)
- Place of birth: San Roque, Cádiz, Spain
- Height: 1.80 m (5 ft 11 in)
- Position: Midfielder

Youth career
- –1978: Algeciras

Senior career*
| Years | Team | Apps | (Gls) |
| 1978–1979 | Algeciras | 21 | (0) |
| 1979–1982 | Sevilla | 15 | (0) |
| 1982–1984 | Cartagena | 31 | (0) |
| 1985–1986 | Levante | 22 | (1) |
| 1987–1988 | Melilla | 20 | (0) |
| 1988–1989 | Olímpic | 23 | (1) |
| Total | | 132 | (2) |

International career
| 1978 | Spain U18 | 6 | (0) |
| 1979 | Spain U19 | 2 | (0) |
| 1979 | Spain U20 | 4 | (0) |
| 1978–1979 | Spain U21 | 2 | (0) |
- * Club domestic league appearances and goals

Antonio Vargas Quijada (born 3 December 1958), commonly known as Biri, is a Spanish retired footballer who played as a midfielder.

== Club career ==
Born in San Roque, Biri nicknamed Viriato, after the ancient leader of the Lusitanians. After watching Biri Biri play for Sevilla FC, he decided he would grow his hair in to a long afro to match his idol. He would wear a wig while the hair was growing, which he later sold. He changed his nickname from Viri to Biri and followed in his idol's footsteps by signing for Sevilla in 1979, but only managed 15 appearances, before returning to the lower Spanish divisions.
