= Rabah Djenadi =

Algerian footballer (born 1959)

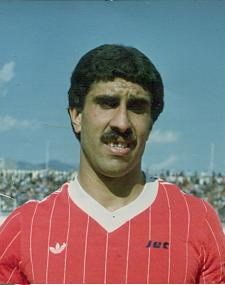

Personal information
- Date of birth: 3 June 1959 (age 67)
- Place of birth: Tizi Ouzou, Algeria
- Position: Defender

International career
Years	Team	Apps	(Gls)
1981–1982	Algeria	6	(0)

Rabah Djenadi (born 3 June 1959) is an Algerian footballer. He played in six matches for the Algeria national football team in 1981 and 1982. He was also named in Algeria's squad for the 1982 African Cup of Nations tournament.
