= József Nagy (footballer, born 1960) =

Hungarian footballer

Personal information
- Full name: József Nagy
- Date of birth: 21 October 1960 (age 66)
- Place of birth: Nádasd, Hungary
- Position: Midfielder

Youth career
- –1975: Nádasdi KSK
- 1975–1979: Szombathelyi Haladás

Senior career*
Years	Team	Apps	(Gls)
1979–1989	Szombathelyi Haladás		
1989–1990	Sabaria SE		

International career
1985	Hungary	1	(0)
- * Club domestic league appearances and goals

József Nagy (born 21 October 1960 in Nádasd) is a Hungarian football player who participated in the 1986 World Cup in Mexico where Hungary was eliminated in the first round.
