= Yasuhito Suzuki =

Japanese footballer

Yasuhito Suzuki 鈴木 康仁
Personal information
- Full name: Yasuhito Suzuki
- Date of birth: December 19, 1959 (age 66)
- Place of birth: Osaka, Japan
- Height: 1.84 m (6 ft 1/2 in)
- Position: Goalkeeper

Youth career
- 1975–1977: Settsu High School

Senior career*
Years	Team	Apps	(Gls)
1978–1982	Yanmar Diesel	8	(0)
Total		8	(0)

International career
1979	Japan U-20	3	(0)
1980	Japan	4	(0)
Medal record
Yanmar Diesel
Winner	Japan Soccer League	1980
Runner-up	Japan Soccer League	1978
Runner-up	JSL Cup	1982
- * Club domestic league appearances and goals

Yasuhito Suzuki (鈴木 康仁, Suzuki Yasuhito; born December 19, 1959) is a former Japanese football player. He played for Japan national team. His son Yuto Suzuki is also footballer.

== Club career ==
Suzuki was born in Osaka Prefecture on December 19, 1959. After graduating from high school, he joined his local club Yanmar Diesel in 1978. However, he could not play in the game much, as he was the team's reserve goalkeeper behind Kazumi Tsubota. The club won the league champions in 1980. He retired in 1982. He played 8 games in the league.

== National team career ==
In August 1979, Suzuki was selected Japan U-20 national team for 1979 World Youth Championship and he played in 3 games. In December 1980, he was selected Japan national team for 1982 World Cup qualification. At this qualification, on December 22, he debuted against Singapore. He played 4 games for Japan in 1980.

== Club statistics ==
Club performance			League	
Season	Club	League	Apps	Goals
Japan			League	
1978	Yanmar Diesel	JSL Division 1	0	0
1979	Yanmar Diesel	JSL Division 1	0	0
1980	Yanmar Diesel	JSL Division 1	8	0
1981	Yanmar Diesel	JSL Division 1	0	0
1982	Yanmar Diesel	JSL Division 1	0	0
Total			8	0

== National team statistics ==
Japan national team
Year	Apps	Goals
1980	4	0
Total	4	0
