= Hugo Caballero (footballer, born 1958) =

Paraguayan footballer

Personal information
- Full name: Hugo Inocencio Caballero Fleytas
- Date of birth: 4 July 1958 (age 68)
- Place of birth: Emboscada, Paraguay
- Height: 1.87 m (6 ft 2 in)
- Position: Centre back

Senior career*
Years	Team	Apps	(Gls)
1976-1987	Cerro Porteño		
1987-1992	Nacional		

International career
1979	Paraguay U20		
1983	Paraguay	2	(0)
- * Club domestic league appearances and goals

Hugo Inocencio Caballero Fleytas (born 4 July 1958, in Emboscada, Paraguay) is a former centre back.
