= FC Dynamo Moscow in European football =

Russian club in European football

The Russian football club FC Dynamo Moscow has taken part in many European competitions. It reached the finals or semi-finals of the European Cup Winners' Cup three times between 1972 and 1985, and in the 2014–15 season has performed strongly in the UEFA Europa League, winning every game at the group stage and reaching Round of 16. At the end of that season, Dynamo was excluded from 2015–16 Europa League competition for violating Financial Fair Play break-even requirements and did not return to UEFA competitions until the 2020–21 season.

== European Cup Winners' Cup 1968–69 ==
Scheduled to play Górnik Zabrze (Poland) , withdrew.

== European Cup Winners' Cup 1971–72 ==
Manager: Konstantin Beskov.

=== First round ===
- 15 September 1971 / Olympiacos F.C. (Greece) – FC Dynamo Moscow 0–2 (Kozlov 83' 88') / Karaiskakis Stadium, Piraeus / Attendance: 50,000

Olympiacos: Mylonas, Angelis, Synetopoulos, Siokos, Persidis, Papadopoulos, Koumarias, Karavitis (Papadimitriou, 46), Gaitatzis, Gioutsos, Delikaris.
FC Dynamo: Pilguy, Shtapov, Anichkin, Zykov, Maslov, Zhukov, Eshtrekov (Kozlov, 68), Sabo, Kozhemyakin (Grebnev, 84), Makhovikov, Yevryuzhikhin.

- 30 September 1971 / FC Dynamo Moscow – Olympiacos F.C. 1–2 (Sabo 15' – Triantafyllos 6' Gaitatzis 45') / Dynamo Stadium, Moscow / Attendance: 22,000

FC Dynamo: Pilguy, Shtapov, Anichkin, Zykov (Basalayev, 46), Maslov, Zhukov, Eshtrekov, Sabo, Kozhemyakin (Kozlov, 55), Makhovikov, Yevryuzhikhin.
Olympiacos: Karypidis, Zoannos, Synetopoulos, Persidis, Gaitatzis, Koureas, Papadimitriou, Karavitis (Papadopoulos, 70), Argyroudis (Pappas, 60), Triantafyllos, Gioutsos.

=== Second round ===
- 20 October 1971 / Eskişehirspor (Turkey) – FC Dynamo Moscow 0–1 (Kozlov 6') / Eskişehir Atatürk Stadium, Eskişehir / Attendance: 15,000

Eskişehirspor: Taşkın, Abdurrahman, İsmail, Kamuran, Faik, Burhan İ., Vahap, Burhan T. (İlhan, 46), Halil, Fethi (captain), Şevki.
FC Dynamo: Pilguy, Basalayev, Anichkin, Grebnev, Dolbonosov, Makhovikov, Zhukov, Syomin, Baidachny, Kozlov, Yevryuzhikhin (Kozhemyakin, 46).

- 3 November 1971 / FC Dynamo Moscow – Eskişehirspor 1–0 (Kozlov 8') / Dynamo Stadium, Moscow / Attendance: 12,000

FC Dynamo: Balyasnikov, Basalayev, Anichkin, Zykov, Dolbonosov, Zhukov, Eshtrekov (Piskunov, 60), Sabo, Kozlov, Makhovikov, Yevryuzhikhin (Larin, 46).
Eskişehirspor: Taşkın, İlhan, Faik, Burhan İ. (Nihat, 35; Burhan T., 65), İsmail, Abdurrahman, Halil, Kamuran, Fethi (captain), Vahap, Süreyya.

=== Quarterfinals ===
- 8 March 1972 / Red Star Belgrade (Socialist Federal Republic of Yugoslavia) – FC Dynamo Moscow 1–2 (Filipović 88' – Kozhemyakin 45' Gershkovich 90') / Stadion Crvena Zvezda, Belgrade / Attendance: 55,000

Red Star Belgrade: Dujković, Klenkovski, Bogićević (Krivokuća, 46), Pavlović, Dojčinovski, Keri, Janković, Karasi (Jovanović, 58), Filipović, Aćimović, Sušić.
FC Dynamo: Pilguy, Basalayev, Dolmatov, Zykov (captain), Sabo, Zhukov, Baidachny (Gershkovich, 81), Yakubik, Kozhemyakin, Makhovikov, Yevryuzhikhin (Kozlov, 66).

- 22 March 1972 / FC Dynamo Moscow – Red Star Belgrade 1–1 (Kozhemyakin 75' – Krivokuća 53') / Pakhtakor Markaziy Stadium, Tashkent / Attendance: 55,000

FC Dynamo: Pilguy, Basalayev, Dolmatov, Zykov (captain), Dolbonosov, Zhukov, Baidachny, Yakubik, Kozhemyakin, Makhovikov, Yevryuzhikhin.
Red Star Belgrade: Dujković, Đorić, Bogićević, Pavlović (captain), Dojčinovski, Krivokuća, Novković, Antonijević, Aćimović, Panajotović, Karasi.

=== Semifinals ===
- 5 April 1972 / Dynamo Berlin (East Germany) – FC Dynamo Moscow 1–1 (Johannsen 83' – Yevryuzhikhin 54') / Friedrich Ludwig Jahn Sportpark, Berlin / Attendance: 30,000

Dynamo Berlin: Lihsa, Stumpf, Carow (captain), Hübner, Trümpler, Rohde, Terletzki, Schütze, Schulenberg, Netz, Johannsen.
FC Dynamo: Pilguy, Basalayev, Dolmatov, Zykov (captain), Sabo, Zhukov, Baidachny, Yakubik, Kozhemyakin, Makhovikov, Yevryuzhikhin.

- 20 April 1972 / FC Dynamo Moscow – Dynamo Berlin 1–1 (Yevryuzhikhin 58' – Netz 37'); 4–1 in shootout Dolmatov (penalty scored) Baidachny (penalty scored) Yevryuzhikhin (penalty scored) Makhovikov (penalty scored) – Johannsen (penalty missed) Terletzki (penalty missed) Carow (penalty scored) / Druzhba Stadium, Lviv / Attendance: 30,000

FC Dynamo: Pilguy, Basalayev, Dolmatov, Zykov (captain), Sabo, Zhukov, Baidachny, Yakubik (Anichkin, 60), Kozhemyakin (Gershkovich, 48), Makhovikov, Yevryuzhikhin.
Dynamo Berlin: Lihsa, Stumpf, Carow (captain), Hübner, Trümpler, Rohde, Terletzki, Schütze (Becker, 112), Schulenberg, Netz (Brillat, 112), Johannsen.

=== Final ===
24 May 1972

(Scotland) Rangers	3–2	Dynamo Moscow (Soviet Union)
Stein 23'; Johnston 40' 49'		Eshtrekov 60'; Makhovikov 87'

Camp Nou, Barcelona
Attendance: 124,701

== 1974–75 UEFA Cup ==
Manager: Gavriil Kachalin.

=== First round ===
- 18 September 1974 / Östers IF (Sweden) – FC Dynamo Moscow 3–2 (Mattsson 17', 31' Nordenberg 74' (pen.) – Kozlov 34' Pavlenko 39') / Värendsvallen, Växjö / Attendance: 5,000

Östers IF: Hagberg, Andersson, Nordenberg, Arvidsson, Bild, Linderoth, T. Svensson (captain) (Isaxon, 46), Blomqvist, Ejderstedt, Mattsson, Bergqvist (P. Svensson, 65).
FC Dynamo: Pilguy, Basalayev, Nikulin, Komarov, Dolbonosov (captain), Petrushin, Pudyshev, Makhovikov (Gavrilov, 75), Kozlov, Pavlenko, Yevryuzhikhin.

- 2 October 1974 / FC Dynamo Moscow – Östers IF 2–1 (Yevryuzhikhin 13' Petrushin 69' – T. Svensson 48' (pen.)) / Dynamo Stadium, Moscow / Attendance: 27,000

FC Dynamo: Pilguy, Basalayev, Nikulin, Zykov, Dolbonosov (captain), Petrushin (Yakubik, 70), Pudyshev, Kozlov (Kozhemyakin, 65), Pavlenko, Makhovikov, Yevryuzhikhin.
Östers IF: Karlsson, Andersson, Nordenberg, Arvidsson, Bild, Linderoth, T. Svensson (captain), Blomqvist, Söderqvist (P. Svensson, 77), Mattsson, Bergqvist.

=== Second round ===
- 23 October 1974 / Dynamo Dresden (East Germany) – FC Dynamo Moscow 1–0 (Sachse 6') / Dynamo Stadium, Dresden / Attendance: 10,000

Dynamo Dresden: Boden, Helm, Dörner, Schmuck, Wätzlich, Häfner, Geyer, Kreische (captain), Sachse (Riedel, 75), Richter, Kotte.
FC Dynamo: Pilguy, Basalayev, Nikulin, Zykov, Dolbonosov (captain), Petrushin, Yakubik, Kozlov, Pavlenko, Makhovikov (Pudyshev, 75), Yevryuzhikhin.

- 6 November 1974 / FC Dynamo Moscow – Dynamo Dresden 1–0 (Kurnenin 28') 3–4 in shootout (Yevryuzhikhin (penalty scored) Yakubik (penalty scored) Makhovikov (penalty scored) Basalayev (penalty missed) Dolmatov (penalty missed) – Wätzlich (penalty scored) Dörner (penalty scored) Kreische (penalty scored) Sachse (penalty missed) Kotte (penalty scored) ) / Dynamo Stadium, Moscow / Attendance: 10,000

FC Dynamo: Pilguy, Basalayev, Nikulin, Zykov, Dolbonosov (captain), Petrushin (Pudyshev, 85), Dolmatov, Kurnenin (Yakubik, 117), Pavlenko, Makhovikov, Yevryuzhikhin.
Dynamo Dresden: Boden, Helm, Dörner, Schmuck, Wätzlich, Häfner, Geyer, Kreische (captain), Riedel (Sachse, 114), Richter (Heidler, 72), Kotte.

== 1976–77 UEFA Cup ==
Manager: Aleksandr Sevidov.

=== First round ===
- 15 September 1976 / AEK Athens F.C. (Greece) – FC Dynamo Moscow 2–0 (Nikoloudis 34' Papaioannou 54') / Nikos Goumas, Athens / Attendance: 25,000

AEK Athens F.C.: Stergioudas, Theodoridis, Zahnleitner, Nikolaou, Ravousis, Tsamis, Tasos (Dedes, 55), Nikoloudis, Wagner, Papaioannou (captain), Mavros.
FC Dynamo: Gontar, Parov, Novikov, Bubnov, Makhovikov, Minayev, Gershkovich (Petrushin, 46), Dolmatov, Yakubik, Kazachyonok (Pavlenko, 56), Yevryuzhikhin.

- 29 September 1976 / FC Dynamo Moscow – AEK Athens F.C. 2–1 (Bubnov 43' Yakubik 52' (pen.) – Tasos 120' (pen.)) / Dynamo Stadium, Moscow / Attendance: 10,000

FC Dynamo: Gontar, Parov, Nikulin, Bubnov, Makhovikov, Minayev, Dolmatov, Gavrilov (Kramarenko, 46), Yakubik, Gershkovich (Novikov, 118), Kazachyonok.
AEK Athens F.C.: Stergioudas, Theodoridis (Zahnleitner, 80), Intzoglou, Ravousis, Nikolaou, Dedes (Tasos, 64), Tsamis, Nikoloudis, Wagner, Papaioannou (captain), Mavros.

== European Cup Winners' Cup 1977–78 ==
Manager: Aleksandr Sevidov.

=== First round ===
- 17 September 1977 / Valletta F.C. (Malta) – FC Dynamo Moscow 0–2 (Kazachyonok 55' Maksimenkov 60') / City Stadium, Valletta / Attendance: 15,000

Valletta F.C.: Debono, Gauci, Galea, Abdilla, Fenech, E. Farrugia, Magro, Demajo (Giglio, 80), Agius (Batada, 68), L. Farrugia, Seychell (captain).
FC Dynamo: Gontar, Parov, Bubnov, Nikulin, Makhovikov, Petrushin, Minayev, Dolmatov (captain), Maksimenkov, Gershkovich (Yakubik, 70), Kazachyonok (Kolesov, 85).

- 29 September 1977 / FC Dynamo Moscow – Valletta F.C. 5–0 (Kolesov 7' 10' 27' Yakubik 9' Kazachyonok 49') / Dynamo Stadium, Moscow / Attendance: 10,000

FC Dynamo: Gontar, Parov, Bubnov, Nikulin (Maksimenkov, 46), Makhovikov, Petrushin, Minayev, Dolmatov, Yakubik, Kolesov, Kazachyonok (Gershkovich, 66).
Valletta F.C.: Debono, Gauci, Galea, Abdilla, Fenech, E. Farrugia, Magro, Giglio, Agius, L. Farrugia, Seychell (captain).

=== Second round ===
- 19 October 1977 / FC Dynamo Moscow – Universitatea Craiova (Romania) 2–0 (Kazachyonok 23' Minayev 43') / Dynamo Stadium, Moscow / Attendance: 5,000

FC Dynamo: Gontar, Parov, Novikov, Nikulin, Makhovikov, Bubnov, Petrushin, Minayev, Gershkovich (Yakubik, 60; Kramarenko, 79), Kolesov, Kazachyonok.
Universitatea Craiova: Boldici, Negrilă, Tilihoi, Purima, Cârţu (Ungureanu, 84), Ştefănescu (captain), Crişan, Balaci, Cămătaru, Ţicleanu (Irimescu, 71), Marcu.

- 2 November 1977 / Universitatea Craiova – FC Dynamo Moscow 2–0 (Cârţu 18' Beldeanu 27') 0–3 in shootout (Beldeanu (penalty missed) Ştefănescu (penalty missed) Negrilă (penalty missed) – Kazachyonok (penalty scored) Maksimenkov (penalty scored) Petrushin (penalty scored) ) / Stadionul Central, Craiova / Attendance: 25,000

Universitatea Craiova: Boldici (Lung, 55), Tilihoi, Ţicleanu, Purima, Cârţu, Ştefănescu (captain), Crişan (Negrilă, 68), Balaci, Cămătaru, Beldeanu, Marcu.
FC Dynamo: Gontar, Parov, Novikov (Yakubik, 34), Bubnov, Makhovikov, Dolmatov (captain), Petrushin, Minayev, Maksimenkov, Kolesov (Gershkovich, 75), Kazachyonok.

=== Quarterfinals ===
- 2 March 1978 / Real Betis (Spain) – FC Dynamo Moscow 0–0 / Estadio Benito Villamarín, Seville / Attendance: 50,000

Real Betis: Esnaola, Sabaté, Gordillo, López, Biosca, Mühren (Bizcocho, 83), Garcia Soriano (Del Pozo, 75), Alabanda, Eulate, Cardeñosa, Anzarda.
FC Dynamo: Gontar, Parov, Novikov, Kazachyonok, Bubnov, Petrushin, Gershkovich, Dolmatov, Yakubik, Maksimenkov, Minayev.

- 15 March 1978 / FC Dynamo Moscow – Real Betis 3–0 (Gershkovich 57' Kazachyonok 61' Mühren 82' (o.g.)) / Dinamo Stadium, Tbilisi / Attendance: 60,000

FC Dynamo: Gontar (Pilguy, 87), Parov (Nikulin, 87), Kazachyonok, Makhovikov, Bubnov, Petrushin, Gershkovich, Dolmatov, Yakubik, Maksimenkov, Minayev.
Real Betis: Esnaola, Bizcocho, Cobo (Del Pozo, 30), Mühren, Biosca, López, Garcia Soriano (Anzarda, 82), Alabanda, Cabezas, Cardeñosa, Gordillo.

=== Semifinals ===
- 29 March 1978 / FC Dynamo Moscow – FK Austria Wien 2–1 (Tsereteli 84' Gershkovich 86' – Baumeister 25') / Dinamo Stadium, Tbilisi / Attendance: 65,000

FC Dynamo: Gontar, Parov, Kazachyonok, Makhovikov, Bubnov, Petrushin (Novikov, 78), Gershkovich, Dolmatov, Yakubik (Tsereteli, 72), Maksimenkov, Minayev.
FK Austria Wien: Baumgartner, R. Sara (captain), Obermayer, Baumeister, Daxbacher, Martínez, Parits, Prohaska, Pirkner, Gasselich, Morales.

- 12 April 1978 / FK Austria Wien – FC Dynamo Moscow 2–1 (Pirkner 49' (pen.) Morales 57' – Yakubik 90') 5–4 in shootout (Obermayer (penalty scored) Morales (penalty scored) Pirkner (penalty scored) Martínez (penalty scored) Prohaska (penalty scored) – Kazachyonok (penalty scored) Maksimenkov (penalty scored) Yakubik (penalty scored) Tsereteli (penalty scored) Bubnov (penalty missed) ) / Praterstadion, Vienna / Attendance: 75,000

FK Austria Wien: Baumgartner, R. Sara (captain), Obermayer, Baumeister, Morales, J. Sara, Drazan (Pospischil, 87), Parits, Prohaska, Pirkner, Gasselich (Martínez, 83).
FC Dynamo: Gontar, Parov (Tsereteli, 54), Novikov, Makhovikov, Bubnov, Petrushin, Gershkovich (Yakubik, 65), Dolmatov, Kazachyonok, Maksimenkov, Minayev.

== European Cup Winners' Cup 1979–80 ==
Manager: Ivan Mozer.

=== First round ===
- Scheduled to play KS Vllaznia Shkodër (Albania) , Vllaznia withdrew.

=== Second round ===
- 24 October 1979 / FC Dynamo Moscow – Boavista F.C. (Portugal) 0–0 / Luzhniki Stadium, Moscow / Attendance: 5,000

FC Dynamo: Gontar, Novikov, Nikulin, Makhovikov (captain), Bubnov, Petrushin, Tolstykh (Kolesov, 46), Minayev, Reznik (Pavlenko, 75), Maksimenkov, Gazzaev.
Boavista: Matos, Barbosa, Taí, Eliseu, Adão, Artur, Almeidinha (Jarbas Dantas, 76), Óscar (Moinhos, 60), Salvador, Ailton, Júlio.

- 7 November 1979 / Boavista F.C. – FC Dynamo Moscow 1–1 (Moinhos 35' – Minayev 26') / Boavista Stadium, Porto / Attendance: 27,000

Boavista: Matos, Barbosa, Taí, Eliseu, Adão, Artur (captain), Almeidinha (Óscar, 65), Moinhos, Júlio, Ailton, Folha (Salvador, 46).
FC Dynamo: Gontar, Novikov, Nikulin, Makhovikov (captain), Bubnov, Petrushin, Kolesov, Minayev, Reznik (Pavlenko, 86), Maksimenkov, Gazzaev.

=== Quarterfinals ===
- 5 March 1980 / FC Dynamo Moscow – FC Nantes (France) 0–2 (Tusseau 57' Pécout 86') / Dinamo Stadium, Tbilisi / Attendance: 30,000

FC Dynamo: Gontar, Lovchev, Nikulin, Makhovikov (captain), Bubnov, Petrushin (Latysh, 61), Reznik, Minayev, Yakubik, Maksimenkov, Gazzaev.
FC Nantes: Bertrand-Demanes, Ayache, Tusseau, Rio (Bibard, 84), E. Trossero, Baronchelli, V. Trossero, Michel (captain), Pécout, Rampillon, Amisse.

- 19 March 1980 / FC Nantes – FC Dynamo Moscow 2–3 (Michel 42' Touré 64' – Minayev 23' Gazzaev 40' Kolesov 88') / Stade Marcel Saupin, Nantes / Attendance: 25,000

FC Nantes: Bertrand-Demanes, Bossis, Tusseau, Rio, E. Trossero, Baronchelli, V. Trossero (Touré, 64), Michel (captain), Pécout, Muller, Rampillon.
FC Dynamo: Pilguy, Lovchev, Nikulin, Makhovikov (captain), Bubnov, Petrushin, Kolesov, Minayev, Novikov (Yakubik, 84), Maksimenkov, Gazzaev.

== 1980–81 UEFA Cup ==
Manager: Vyacheslav Solovyov.

=== First round ===
- 17 September 1980 / KSC Lokeren (Belgium) – FC Dynamo Moscow 1–1 (Verheyen 85' (pen.) – V. Gazzaev 34' V. Gazzaev (red card) 60') / Daknamstadion, Lokeren / Attendance: 18,000

KSC Lokeren: Hoogenboom, Ingels, Snelders, Verbruggen, De Schrijver (captain), Elkjær, Verheyen, Somers, Lubański (Van Cauter, 82), Mommens, Lato.
FC Dynamo: Pilguy (captain), Reznik, Nikulin, Novikov, Bubnov, Petrushin, Matyunin (Moiseyev, 85), Minayev, Tolstykh, Maksimenkov, V. Gazzaev.

- 1 October 1980 / FC Dynamo Moscow – KSC Lokeren 0–1 (Verheyen 89') / Dynamo Stadium, Moscow / Attendance: 11,000

FC Dynamo: Pilguy (captain), Novikov, Nikulin, Tolstykh, Bubnov, Petrushin, Latysh, Minayev, Reznik (Kolesov, 56; Yu. Gazzaev, 84), Maksimenkov, Matyunin.
KSC Lokeren: Hoogenboom, Ingels (Dalving, 46), Snelders, Verbruggen, De Schrijver, Elkjær, Verheyen, Somers (captain), Lato (Van Cauter, 80), Mommens, Guðjohnsen.

== 1982–83 UEFA Cup ==
Manager: Vyacheslav Solovyov.

=== First round ===
- 15 September 1982 / Śląsk Wrocław (Poland) – FC Dynamo Moscow 2–2 (Sybis 1' Socha 17' – Mentyukov 35' Dzhavadov 50') / Olympic Stadium, Wrocław / Attendance: 17,000

Śląsk Wrocław: Kostrzewa, Sobiesiak, Kopycki, Król, Majewski, Faber (captain), Pękala, Tarasiewicz, Prusik (Mikołajewicz, 78), Sybis, Socha (Ptak, 58).
FC Dynamo: Gontar, Golovnya, Nikulin, Makhovikov, Novikov, Mentyukov, Latysh (Tkebuchava, 61; Matyunin, 88), Minayev (captain), Tolstykh, Molodtsov, Dzhavadov.

- 29 September 1982 / FC Dynamo Moscow – Śląsk Wrocław 0–1 (Tarasiewicz 17') / Dynamo Stadium, Moscow / Attendance: 12,000

FC Dynamo: Gontar, Golovnya (Shevtsov, 46), Nikulin, Makhovikov, Novikov, Mentyukov, Latysh, Minayev (captain), Tolstykh, Molodtsov (Adzhoyev, 46), Dzhavadov.
Śląsk Wrocław: Kostrzewa, Sobiesiak, Majewski, Kopycki, Król, Faber (captain), Tarasiewicz, Pękala (Nocko, 25), Prusik, Kowalczyk (Socha, 84), Sybis.

== European Cup Winners' Cup 1984–85 ==
Manager: Aleksandr Sevidov.

=== First round ===
- 19 September 1984 / FC Dynamo Moscow – HNK Hajduk Split (Socialist Federal Republic of Yugoslavia) 1–0 (Argudyayev 9') / Dynamo Stadium, Moscow / Attendance: 14,200

FC Dynamo: Prudnikov, Bulanov, Novikov (captain), Fomichyov, Golovnya, Khapsalis, Ataulin, Pudyshev, Argudyayev (Molodtsov, 87), Karatayev, Gazzaev.
HNK Hajduk Split: Pudar, Španjić, Dražic, Gudelj (captain), Andrijašević, Čelić, Zlatko Vujović (Bućan, 77), Šalov, Zoran Vujović, Asanović, Prekazi (Macan, 78).

- 3 October 1984 / HNK Hajduk Split – FC Dynamo Moscow 2–5 (Deverić 40' Vujović 50' (pen.) – Gazzaev 7' 57' 77' (pen.) Bulanov 63' Khapsalis 80') / Gradski vrt, Osijek / Attendance: 40,000

HNK Hajduk Split: Pudar, Andrijašević, Gudelj (captain), Bakrač (Španjić, 71), Čelić, Zlatko Vujović, Slišković, Šalov (Dražic, 71), Asanović, Deverić.
FC Dynamo: Prudnikov, Bulanov, Novikov (captain), Fomichyov, Golovnya, Khapsalis, Ataulin, Pudyshev (Silkin, 81), Argudyayev (Chesnokov, 71), Karatayev, Gazzaev.

=== Second round ===
- 24 October 1984 / FC Dynamo Moscow – Ħamrun Spartans F.C. (Malta) 5–0 (Gazzaev 6' 64' Karatayev 43' Khapsalis 52' Bulanov 56') / Dynamo Stadium, Moscow / Attendance: 7,300

FC Dynamo: Prudnikov, Bulanov, Novikov (captain), Fomichyov, Golovnya, Khapsalis, Ataulin, Pudyshev (Matyunin, 70), Argudyayev, Karatayev, Gazzaev (Mentyukov, 70).
Ħamrun Spartans F.C.: Zammit, Farrugia (captain), Alex Azzopardi, Grech, G. Xuereb, Alfred Azzopardi (Salerno, 81), L. Refalo, Robertson, Stegner (G. Refalo, 53), R. Xuereb, Degiorgio.

- 7 November 1984 / Ħamrun Spartans F.C. – FC Dynamo 0–1 (Chesnokov 12') / Central Stadium, Ħamrun / Attendance: 7,000

Ħamrun Spartans F.C.: Zammit, Farrugia, Alex Azzopardi, Grech, G. Xuereb, Alfred Azzopardi, L. Refalo, G. Refalo (Stegner, 46), Degiorgio, Robertson (captain), R. Xuereb, Consiglio.
FC Dynamo: Prudnikov, Matyunin, Novikov (captain), Fomichyov, Golovnya, Khapsalis (Bulanov, 46), Ataulin, Pudyshev, Chesnokov, Karatayev, Argudyayev (Borodyuk, 46).

=== Quarterfinals ===
- 6 March 1985 / AEL (Greece) – FC Dynamo Moscow 0–0 / Alkazar, Larissa / Attendance: 17,000

Larissa F.C.: Plitsis, Parafestas (captain), Patsiavouras, Mitsibonas, Galitsios, Voutiritsas, Ziogas (Tsiolis, 87), Kmiecik, Adamczyk, Andreoudis (Christodoulou, 87), Valaoras.
FC Dynamo: Prudnikov, Silkin, Novikov (captain), Fomichyov, Golovnya, Vasilyev (Stukashov, 77), Ataulin, Pudyshev, Borodyuk (Molodtsov, 63), Karatayev, Gazzaev.

- 20 March 1985 / FC Dynamo Moscow – Larissa F.C. 1–0 (Fomichyov 61') / Dinamo Stadium, Tbilisi / Attendance: 16,200

FC Dynamo: Prudnikov (captain), Silkin, Novikov, Fomichyov, Golovnya, Khapsalis, Ataulin, Vasilyev, Stukashov (Pudyshev, 68), Karatayev (Borodyuk, 86), Gazzaev.
Larissa F.C.: Plitsis, Parafestas (captain), Patsiavouras, Mitsibonas, Galitsios, Voutiritsas, Ziogas (Tsiolis, 40; Rigas, 68), Kmiecik, Adamczyk, Andreoudis, Valaoras.

=== Semifinals ===
- 10 April 1985 / SK Rapid Wien (Austria) – FC Dynamo Moscow 3–1 (Lainer 68' Krankl 70' (pen.) Hrstic 73' – Karatayev 26') / Gerhard Hanappi Stadium, Vienna / Attendance: 20,000

SK Rapid Wien: Konsel, Lainer, Pregesbauer (Hrstic, 46), Garger, Weinhofer, Panenka (Stadler, 85), Brauneder, Willfurth, Kranjčar, Krankl (captain), Pacult.
FC Dynamo: Prudnikov (captain), Silkin, Novikov, Pozdnyakov, Bulanov, Khapsalis (Borodyuk, 76), Ataulin, Vasilyev (Pudyshev, 67), Stukashov, Karatayev, Gazzaev.

- 24 April 1985 / FC Dynamo Moscow – SK Rapid Wien 1–1 (Pozdnyakov 29' – Panenka 4') / Dynamo Stadium, Moscow / Attendance: 50,000

FC Dynamo: Prudnikov (captain), Bulanov, Novikov, Pozdnyakov, Golovnya, Khapsalis (Matyunin, 75), Ataulin, Vasilyev, Stukashov, Karatayev, Molodtsov (Pudyshev, 23).
SK Rapid Wien: Konsel, Lainer, Garger, Brauneder, Weber, Kienast, Panenka (Hrstic, 67), Krankl (captain), Bručić, Pacult (Willfurth, 60).

== 1987–88 UEFA Cup ==
Manager: Eduard Malofeyev.

=== First round ===
- 16 September 1987 / Grasshopper Club Zürich (Switzerland) – FC Dynamo Moscow 0–4 (Borodyuk 23' 45' (pen.) 58' Karatayev 79') / Hardturm, Zürich / Attendance: 30,000

Grasshopper Club Zürich: Brunner, Bianchi (De Siebenthal, 46), Stutz, Egli (captain), Andermatt, Imhof, Koller, Paulo César, Larsen, Ponte, Gren.
FC Dynamo: Prudnikov (captain) (Uvarov, 85), Losev, Timoshenko (Sklyarov, 74), Novikov, Silkin, Dobrovolsky, Bulanov, Vasilyev, Stukashov, Karatayev, Borodyuk.

- 30 September 1987 / FC Dynamo Moscow – Grasshopper Club Zürich 1–0 (Vasilyev 33') / Dynamo Stadium, Moscow / Attendance: 16,300

FC Dynamo: Prudnikov (captain), Losev, Kolyvanov (Sklyarov, 86), Novikov, Silkin, Dobrovolsky, Bulanov, Vasilyev, Stukashov, Karatayev, Borodyuk.
Grasshopper Club Zürich: Brunner, Stiel, Stutz, Egli (captain), Andermatt, Larsen, Koller, Paulo César, Imhof, Ponte (Bachini, 63), De Siebenthal.

=== Second round ===
- 21 October 1987 / FC Barcelona (Spain) – FC Dynamo Moscow 2–0 (Amarilla 10' Schuster 28') / Camp Nou, Barcelona / Attendance: 26,000

FC Barcelona: Zubizarreta, Gerardo, Migueli, Julio Alberto, Víctor Muñoz (Calderé, 72), Alexanco (captain), Amarilla, Schuster, Roberto, Lineker, Urbano.
FC Dynamo: Prudnikov (captain), Losev, Timoshenko, Sklyarov, Silkin, Dobrovolsky, Bulanov, Vasilyev (Demidov, 66), Stukashov (Kolyvanov, 53), Karatayev, Borodyuk.

- 4 November 1987 / FC Dynamo Moscow – FC Barcelona 0–0 / Dynamo Stadium, Moscow / Attendance: 24,500

FC Dynamo: Prudnikov (captain), Morozov, Sklyarov, Timoshenko, Silkin, Dobrovolsky, Bulanov, Vasilyev, Stukashov, Karatayev (Kiriakov, 61), Borodyuk.
FC Barcelona: Zubizarreta, Gerardo (Salva, 63), Alexanco (captain), Julio Alberto, Víctor Muñoz, Moratalla, Carrasco, Schuster, Calderé, Lineker, Urbano.

== 1991–92 UEFA Cup ==
Manager: Valery Gazzaev.

=== First round ===
- 18 September 1991 / Vaci Izzo MTE (Hungary) – FC Dynamo Moscow 1–0 (Hahn 61') / Stadion Városi Vác, Vác / Attendance: 8,000

Vaci Izzo MTE: Koszta, Bereczki (Puglits, 46), Hahn, Luis Carlos, Kriska (Horváth, 83), Simon, Romanek, Zombori, Orosz, Vig, Füle.
FC Dynamo: Smetanin, Losev (captain), Sklyarov, Tsaryov, Chernyshov, Kobelev, Smertin, Pankratjevas, Kolyvanov, Leonenko (Simutenkov, 71), Tetradze (Sereda, 37).

- 2 October 1991 / FC Dynamo Moscow – Vaci Izzo MTE 4–1 (Kobelev 8' (pen.) Kiriakov 31' Kolyvanov 49' 68' – Romanek 25') / Dynamo Stadium, Moscow / Attendance: 4,300

FC Dynamo: Smetanin, Tsaryov, Sklyarov (Timoshenko, 61), Tetradze, Chernyshov, Kobelev, Smertin, Derkach, Kolyvanov, Leonenko, Kiriakov (Pankratjevas, 67).
Vaci Izzo MTE: Koszta, Nagy, Hahn, Horváth, Puglits, Kriska, Romanek, Zombori (Nyilas, 82), Bánföldi (Repasi, 65), Vig, Füle.

=== Second round ===
- 22 October 1991 / AS Cannes (France) – FC Dynamo Moscow 0–1 (Kiriakov 43') / Stade Pierre de Coubertin, Cannes / Attendance: 14,000

AS Cannes: Dussuyer, Sassus, Dréossi, Koot, Bray (Omam-Biyik, 46), Guérit, Daniel, Durix, Langers, Asanović (Priou, 61), Zidane.
FC Dynamo: Smetanin, Tsaryov, Sklyarov, Dolgov, Chernyshov, Kobelev, Timoshenko, Tetradze, Kolyvanov, Leonenko (Smertin, 85), Kiriakov (Simutenkov, 88).

- 6 November 1991 / FC Dynamo Moscow – AS Cannes 1–1 (Kobelev 43' (pen.) – Omam-Biyik 9') / Dynamo Stadium, Moscow / Attendance: 6,200

FC Dynamo: Smetanin, Tsaryov, Sklyarov (Smertin, 46), Dolgov, Chernyshov, Kobelev (captain), Timoshenko, Tetradze, Kolyvanov, Leonenko, Kiriakov (Simutenkov, 88).
AS Cannes: Dussuyer, Sassus, Dréossi, Koot, Fernández, Guérit, Omam-Biyik, Bray (Zidane, 75), Daniel, Asanović, Priou (Langers, 75).

=== Third round ===
- 27 November 1991 / K.A.A. Gent (Belgium) – FC Dynamo Moscow 2–0 (Vandenbergh 30' Van Der Linden 83') / Jules Ottenstadion, Ghent / Attendance: 18,347

K.A.A. Gent: Petry, Verkuyl, Verdegem (Herbots, 72), Dauwen, De Groote (Porte, 16), Vangronsveld, Janssens, Medved, Vandenbergh, Viscaal, Van Der Linden.
FC Dynamo: Smetanin, Pankratjevas, Tsaryov, Tetradze, Chernyshov (captain), Drozdov, Smertin, Timoshenko (Sereda, 40), Simutenkov, Leonenko, Kiriakov (But, 88).

- 11 December 1991 / FC Dynamo Moscow – K.A.A. Gent 0–0 (Derkach (yellow card) 2' (yellow-red card) 4' Losev (yellow card) 15' (yellow-red card) 89') / Lokomotiv Stadium, Simferopol / Attendance: 6,300

FC Dynamo: Smetanin, Losev, Tsaryov, Dolgov, Tetradze, Kobelev, Smertin, Derkach, Simutenkov, Leonenko, Kiriakov.
K.A.A. Gent: Petry, Verkuyl, Verdegem, Dauwen, Herbots (Maes, 82), Vangronsveld, Janssens, Medved, Porte, Viscaal (Balenga, 87), Van Der Linden.

== 1992–93 UEFA Cup ==
Manager: Valery Gazzaev.

=== First round ===
- 16 September 1992 / FC Dynamo Moscow – Rosenborg BK (Norway) 5–1 (Sklyarov 34' 62' Timofeev 46' Simutenkov 57' Tetradze 68' – Løken 75') / Dynamo Stadium, Moscow / Attendance: 6,500

FC Dynamo: Kleimyonov, Timofeev, Sklyarov (captain), Tskhadadze, Kalitvintsev (Spanderashvili, 88), Hovhannisyan, Smertin (Drozdov, 71), Tsaryov, Tetradze, Gasimov, Simutenkov.
Rosenborg BK: Rise, Husby, Tangen, Bragstad (Kvarme, 46), Bjørnebye, Ingebrigtsen, Leonhardsen, Skammelsrud, Sørloth, Dahlum (Strand, 73), Løken.

- 30 September 1992 / Rosenborg BK – FC Dynamo Moscow 2–0 (Ingebrigtsen 8' Løken 48') / Lerkendal stadion, Trondheim / Attendance: 10,218

Rosenborg BK: Rise, Husby, Tangen, Bragstad, Bjørnebye, Ingebrigtsen, Leonhardsen, Skammelsrud, Løken, Sørloth, Dahlum.
FC Dynamo: Kleimyonov, Tsaryov, Sklyarov, Tskhadadze, Kalitvintsev, Kobelev (captain), Smertin, Derkach, Hovhannisyan, Gasimov (Spanderashvili, 88), Simutenkov (Drozdov, 70).

=== Second round ===
- 22 October 1992 / Torino F.C. (Italy) – FC Dynamo Moscow 1–2 (Timofeev 53' (o.g.) – Gasimov 44' Simutenkov 66') / Stadio delle Alpi, Turin / Attendance: 26,943

Torino F.C.: Marchegiani, Bruno, Sergio (Silenzi, 72), Fortunato, Annoni (Mussi, 77), Fusi, Sordo, Casagrande, Aguilera, Scifo, Venturin.
FC Dynamo: Kleimyonov, Timofeev, Sklyarov (Varlamov, 84), Tskhadadze, Tsaryov, Kobelev (captain), Smertin, Derkach, Tetradze, Gasimov (Hovhannisyan, 88), Simutenkov.

- 5 November 1992 / FC Dynamo Moscow – Torino F.C. 0–0 (Simutenkov (red card) 55' – Annoni (red card) 90') / Dynamo Stadium, Moscow / Attendance: 13,000

FC Dynamo: Kleimyonov, Timofeev, Sklyarov, Tskhadadze, Kalitvintsev (Tsaryov, 66), Kobelev (captain), Varlamov, Derkach, Tetradze, Gasimov (Hovhannisyan, 87), Simutenkov.
Torino F.C.: Marchegiani, Bruno, Sergio, Mussi, Annoni, Fusi (Silenzi, 47), Sordo (Poggi, 74), Casagrande, Aguilera, Scifo, Venturin.

=== Third round ===
- 25 November 1992 / FC Dynamo Moscow – S.L. Benfica (Portugal) 2–2 (Kalitvintsev 75' Derkach 88' – Isaías 35' 54') / Torpedo Stadium, Moscow / Attendance: 8,700

FC Dynamo: Kleimyonov, Hovhannisyan (Kovardayev, 55), Sklyarov, Tskhadadze, Kalitvintsev, Kobelev (captain), Smertin (Savchenko, 84), Derkach, Tetradze, Gasimov, Varlamov.
S.L. Benfica: Silvino, José Carlos, Hélder, William, Veloso, Schwarz, Vítor Paneira, Sousa, Mostovoi, Yuran (Paulo Madeira, 79), Isaías.

- 8 December 1992 / S.L. Benfica – FC Dynamo Moscow 2–0 (Isaías 53' Yuran 58') / Estádio da Luz, Lisbon / Attendance: 67,000

S.L. Benfica: Silvino, José Carlos, Hélder, William, Veloso, Schwarz, Vítor Paneira (Rui Águas, 65), Sousa, Rui Costa, Yuran (Pacheco, 82), Isaías.
FC Dynamo: Kleimyonov, Timofeev, Sklyarov, Tskhadadze, Kalitvintsev, Kobelev (captain) (Varlamov, 69), Smertin (Savchenko, 75), Derkach, Tetradze, Gasimov, Tsaryov.

== 1993–94 UEFA Cup ==
Managers: Valery Gazzaev (first leg), Adamas Golodets (second leg).

=== First round ===
- 14 September 1993 / FC Dynamo Moscow – Eintracht Frankfurt (Germany) 0–6 (Gaudino 9' Weber 25' Furtok 45' Bein 48' Okocha 81' Yeboah 89') / Dynamo Stadium, Moscow / Attendance: 14,000

FC Dynamo: Smetanin, Selezov, Kovtun, Smertin, Kalitvintsev, Chernyshov, Tedeyev, Cheryshev, Tetradze, Dobrovolsky (captain), Rybakov (Nekrasov, 46).
Eintracht Frankfurt: Stein, Roth, Weber, Bindewald, Binz, Gaudino, Komljenović, Dickhaut, Yeboah, Bein (Okocha, 64), Furtok.

- 28 September 1993 / Eintracht Frankfurt – FC Dynamo Moscow 1–2 (Furtok 65' – Simutenkov 23' Dobrovolsky 53') / Waldstadion, Frankfurt am Main / Attendance: 4,900

Eintracht Frankfurt: Stein, Tskhadadze, Weber, Roth, Binz, Gaudino (Dickhaut, 65), Falkenmayer, Bindewald, Andersen, Bein, Furtok (Hagner, 71).
FC Dynamo: Kleimyonov, Selezov, Krutov (Nekrasov, 71), Smertin, Kalitvintsev, Chernyshov, Tedeyev, Cheryshev (Savchenko, 86), Tetradze, Dobrovolsky (captain), Simutenkov.

== 1994–95 UEFA Cup ==
Manager: Konstantin Beskov.

=== First round ===
- 13 September 1994 / R.F.C. Seraing (Belgium) – FC Dynamo Moscow 3–4 (Wamberto 68' Schaessens 74' Edmílson 88' – Smirnov 18' Cheryshev 28' 61' Simutenkov 43' (pen.)) / Pairay Stadium, Seraing / Attendance: 7,172

R.F.C. Seraing: Huysmans, Debusschere, Ducoulombier (Lawarée, 55), Schaessens, De Nil, Karagiannis, Edmilson, Wamberto, Teppers, Lukaku.
FC Dynamo: Smetanin, Timofeev, Samatov, Shulgin, Smirnov, Chernyshov (captain), Klyuyev, Cheryshev, Tetradze (Borodkin, 69), Ivanov, Simutenkov.

- 27 September 1994 / FC Dynamo Moscow – R.F.C. Seraing 0–1 (Schaessens 89') / Dynamo Stadium, Moscow / Attendance: 5,000

FC Dynamo: Smetanin, Timofeev, Samatov, S. Nekrasov, Smirnov (Kutsenko, 41), Chernyshov (captain), Klyuyev, Cheryshev, Yakhimovich, Ivanov, Simutenkov.
R.F.C. Seraing: Heinen, Ngombo, Debusschere, Ducoulombier, Schaessens, De Nil, Karagiannis, Edmilson (Houben, 46), Lawarée, Teppers (Van den Bergh, 62), Lukaku.

=== Second round ===
- 18 October 1994 / FC Dynamo Moscow – Real Madrid (Spain) 2–2 (Simutenkov 65' Cheryshev 69' – Sandro 21' Zamorano 73') / Dynamo Stadium, Moscow / Attendance: 7,000

FC Dynamo: Smetanin, Timofeev, Kovtun, S. Nekrasov, Samatov, Chernyshov (captain), Klyuyev, Cheryshev, Yakhimovich, Ivanov, Simutenkov.
Real Madrid: Cañizares, Chendo, Luis Enrique, Hierro, Milla, Alkorta, Butragueño (Dubovský, 71), Amavisca, Zamorano, Martín Vázquez, Sandro (Míchel, 71).

- 1 November 1994 / Real Madrid – FC Dynamo Moscow 4–0 (Zamorano 48' Redondo 75' Dani 88' 90') / Santiago Bernabéu Stadium, Madrid / Attendance: 60,000

Real Madrid: Buyo, Sánchez Flores, Luis Enrique, Hierro (Chendo, 46), Redondo, Sanchís, Butragueño, Míchel, Zamorano (Dani, 71), Laudrup, Amavisca.
FC Dynamo: Smetanin, Samatov, Kovtun, Khidiyatullin (Borodkin, 61), Shulgin, S. Nekrasov, Filippov (Klyuyev, 12), Cheryshev, Yakhimovich, Ivanov, Simutenkov.

== UEFA Cup Winners' Cup 1995–96 ==
Manager: Adamas Golodets.

=== First round ===
- 14 September 1995 / FC Dynamo Moscow – FC Ararat Yerevan (Armenia) 3–1 (Teryokhin 45' 90' Safronov 73' – Stepanyan 71') / Dynamo Stadium, Moscow / Attendance: 7,500

FC Dynamo: Smetanin (captain), Yakhimovich, Shulgin, Kolotovkin, Sabitov (Tishkov, 79), Kobelev (A. Grishin, 55), Samatov, Cheryshev (Safronov, 62), S. Nekrasov, Kuznetsov, Teryokhin.
FC Ararat Yerevan: Petrosyan, Shahgeldyan, Gspeyan, Tonoyan, Stepanyan, Hayrapetyan, Mkryan, Ter-Petrosyan (Nazaryan, 84), Mkhitaryan (Harutyunyan, 46), Kocharyan, Voskanyan.

- 28 September 1995 / FC Ararat Yerevan – FC Dynamo Moscow 0–1 (Teryokhin 65') / Hrazdan Stadium, Yerevan / Attendance: 20,000

FC Ararat Yerevan: Petrosyan, Shahgeldyan, Gspeyan, Tonoyan, Stepanyan (Harutyunyan, 66), Nigoyan, Mkryan, Ter-Petrosyan, Mkhitaryan, Hayrapetyan, Voskanyan (Kocharyan, 46).
FC Dynamo: Kleimyonov, A. Grishin (Kobelev, 85), Kovtun, Kolotovkin, Shulgin, Kuznetsov, Samatov, Cheryshev, S. Nekrasov (Safronov, 85), Podpaly (captain), Teryokhin.

=== Second round ===
- 19 October 1995 / FC Dynamo Moscow – SK Hradec Králové (Czech Republic) 1–0 (Kuznetsov 59') / Dynamo Stadium, Moscow / Attendance: 4,000

FC Dynamo: Kleimyonov, Kuznetsov, Kovtun, S. Nekrasov, Shulgin, Kobelev (A. Grishin, 46), Samatov, Cheryshev, Safronov, Podpaly (captain), Tishkov (Kutsenko, 78).
SK Hradec Králové: Vahala, Řehák (Vrabel, 76), Urban, Šmarda, Dzubara, Ptáček (Drozd, 77), Kaplan (Holub, 64), Urbánek, Černý, Mašek, Hynek.

- 2 November 1995 / SK Hradec Králové – FC Dynamo Moscow 1–0 (Kaplan 15') 1–3 in shootout (Drozd (penalty missed) Černý (penalty missed) Dzubara (penalty missed) Holub (penalty scored) – Kobelev (penalty scored) Teryokhin (penalty missed) Samatov (penalty scored) Kovtun (penalty scored) ) / Všesportovní Stadion, Hradec Králové / Attendance: 11,540

SK Hradec Králové: Vahala, Řehák, Dzubara, Urbánek, Urban, Drozd, Ulich, Černý, Kaplan (Zoubek, 74, Ptáček, 119), Holub, Hynek.
FC Dynamo: Smetanin, Kuznetsov, Kovtun, Kolotovkin, Yakhimovich, A. Grishin, Samatov, Cheryshev (Kobelev, 120), Safronov (Tishkov, 70), Podpaly (captain), Teryokhin.

=== Quarterfinals ===
- 7 March 1996 / FC Dynamo Moscow – SK Rapid Wien (Austria) 0–1 (Stumpf 35') / Lokomotiv Stadium, Moscow / Attendance: 8,300

FC Dynamo: Smetanin (captain), Yakhimovich, Kovtun, Shulgin (Kutsenko, 63), Nekrasov, Kobelev, Samatov, Cheryshev (Tishkov, 40), Safronov (A. Grishin, 39), Kuznetsov, Teryokhin.
SK Rapid Wien: Konsel, Hatz, Guggi, Ivanov, Schöttel, Stöger, Stumpf, Marasek, Jancker, Jovanovic, Heraf.

- 21 March 1996 / SK Rapid Wien – FC Dynamo Moscow 3–0 (Jancker 49' 74' Stöger 63' (pen.) Jovanovic (red card) 82' – Cheryshev (red card) 29' Teryokhin (red card) 82') / Ernst-Happel-Stadion, Vienna / Attendance: 44,000

SK Rapid Wien: Konsel, Hatz, Guggi, Ivanov, Schöttel, Stöger, Stumpf, Marasek, Jancker, Jovanovic, Heraf.
FC Dynamo: Smetanin (captain), Yakhimovich, Kovtun, Shulgin (Safronov, 59), Nekrasov, Kobelev, Samatov (Lemeshko, 65), Cheryshev, A. Grishin (Tishkov, 56), Podpaly, Teryokhin.

== 1996–97 UEFA Cup ==
Manager: Adamas Golodets.

=== Qualifying round ===
- 6 August 1996 / FC Dynamo Moscow – FC Jazz Pori (Finland) 1–1 (Kobelev 15' – Laaksonen 38') / Dynamo Stadium, Moscow / Attendance: 2,500

FC Dynamo: Smetanin (captain), Yakhimovich, Kovtun, Kolotovkin, Shtanyuk, Kobelev, S. Grishin, Tishkov, Kuznetsov, A. Grishin, Artyomov (R. Gusev, 33).
FC Jazz Pori: Siitonen, Nieminen, Rantanen, Sulonen, Riippa (Puputti, 65), Ollikkala, Leivo-Jokimäki, Koskikangas (Roiko, 68), Luiz Antônio (Santos, 79), Piracaia, Laaksonen.

- 20 August 1996 / FC Jazz Pori – FC Dynamo Moscow 1–3 (Leivo-Jokimäki 41' Rantanen (red card) 60' – Kobelev 60' (pen.) Artyomov 68' 82') / Porin Stadion, Pori / Attendance: 9,500

FC Jazz Pori: Siitonen, Nieminen, Rantanen, Sulonen, Riippa, Ollikkala, Leivo-Jokimäki (Suikkanen, 65), Luiz Antônio, Piracaia, Laaksonen (Santos, 82), Puputti (Roiko, 75).
FC Dynamo: Smetanin (captain), Yakhimovich, Kovtun, Kolotovkin, Shtanyuk, Kobelev (Gushchin, 80), S. Grishin, Tishkov, R. Gusev, A. Grishin (Artyomov, 54), Tochilin (Nekrasov, 73).

=== First round ===
- 10 September 1996 / A.S. Roma (Italy) – FC Dynamo Moscow 3–0 (Tommasi 7' Fonseca 18' 40' (pen.)) / Stadio Olimpico, Rome / Attendance: 60,000

A.S. Roma: Sterchele, Trotta, Lanna, Annoni, Thern, Aldair, Tommasi, Balbo (Berretta, 31), Totti (Grossi, 56), Fonseca (Bernardini, 80), Di Biagio.
FC Dynamo: Smetanin (captain), Yakhimovich, Nekrasov, Kolotovkin, Shtanyuk, Kobelev, S. Grishin, Cheryshev, Kuznetsov (R. Gusev, 67), A. Grishin, Tochilin (Tishkov, 24).

- 24 September 1996 / FC Dynamo Moscow – A.S. Roma 1–3 (Kobelev 19' (pen.) – Fonseca 45' (pen.) Tommasi 71' Berretta 77') / Dynamo Stadium, Moscow / Attendance: 5,000

FC Dynamo: Kleimyonov, Dyomin, Kovtun, Kolotovkin, Gushchin (R. Gusev, 46), Kobelev (captain) (Nekrasov, 46), S. Grishin, Cheryshev, Kuznetsov (Kutsenko, 46), A. Grishin, Teryokhin.
A.S. Roma: Sterchele, Trotta, Lanna, Annoni, Thern, Aldair, Fonseca (Balbo, 46), Carboni, Di Biagio (Grossi, 73), Tommasi (Berretta, 73), Bernardini.

== UEFA Intertoto Cup 1997 ==
Manager: Adamas Golodets.

=== Group stage ===
- 29 June 1997 / FC Dynamo Moscow – Panachaiki (Greece) 2–1 (Shtanyuk 8', Kutsenko 43' – Klejch 11') / Dynamo Stadium, Moscow / Attendance: 3,500

FC Dynamo: Tiapushkin, Tochilin (Zharinov, 68), Kovtun, Ostrovskiy (Korablyov, 75), Shtanyuk, Kulchiy, Grishin, Skokov (Gusev, 78), Kutsenko, Nekrasov, Teryokhin.
Panachaiki: Karasavvas, Katribouzas (Ioannou, 77), Komianos, Meidanis, Argyropoulos, Kyriakopoulos (Kordonouris, 46), Mimpo, Katsouranis (Haxhi, 60), Klejch, Karipov, Samaras.

- 5 July 1997 / B36 Tórshavn (Faroe Islands) – FC Dynamo Moscow 0–1 (Ostrovskiy 78') / Svangaskarð, Toftir / Attendance: 500

B36 Tórshavn: Høgnesen, Johansen, T. E. Hansen, Joensen, Sivić, J.K. Hansen, Johnsson, Johannesen, Borg (Mørk, 85), Petersen, Danielsen.
FC Dynamo: Tiapushkin, Tochilin, Kovtun, Ostrovskiy, Shtanyuk, Kulchiy, Grishin (Tishkov, 7), Skokov, Kutsenko, Nekrasov, Gusev (Kulyov, 57).

- 12 July 1997 / FC Dynamo Moscow – Racing Genk (Belgium) 3–2 (Teryokhin 22' Kulchiy 37' Korablyov 44' - Oularé 27' Keita 48') / Dynamo Stadium, Moscow / Attendance: 3,000

FC Dynamo: Tiapushkin, Tochilin (Gusev, 38), Kovtun, Ostrovskiy, Korablyov, Kobelev (captain), Zharinov, Kutsenko (Kulyov, 61), Kulchiy, Nekrasov, Teryokhin.
Racing Genk: Brockhauser, Peeters, Kimoni, Oyen, Delbroek, Olivieri, Bukalski, Clement (Nsumbu, 70), Oularé, Guðjónsson (Hendrikx, 58), Keita (Strupar, 58).

- 19 July 1997 / Stabæk (Norway) – FC Dynamo Moscow 1–1 (Skistad 77' – Kosolapov 46') / Nadderud stadion, Bærum / Attendance: 2,000

Stabæk: Røvde, Holter, Flem, Skistad, Basma, Stenersen (Løken, 46), Svindal Larsen, Jansson, Grimstad (Hanssen, 46), Kolle, Frigård (Stavrum, 61).
FC Dynamo: Tiapushkin, Korablyov, Kozlov, Tochilin, Povorov, Zharinov, Likhobabenko, Kulyov, Kutsenko (Gordeyev, 72), Gusev (Sherstnyov, 77), Kosolapov (Artyomov, 65).

=== Semifinals ===
- 27 July 1997 / FC Dynamo Moscow – MSV Duisburg (Germany) 2–2 (Teryokhin 18' 38' – Osthoff 60' Salou 64') / Dynamo Stadium, Moscow / Attendance: 5,000

FC Dynamo: Tiapushkin, Kutsenko (Kosolapov, 75), Kovtun, Ostrovskiy, Shtanyuk, Kobelev (captain), Zharinov (Tochilin, 66), Skokov, Kulchiy, Nekrasov, Teryokhin.
MSV Duisburg: Gill, Emmerling, Wohlert, Reiter, Wolters (Puschmann, 68), Komljenović, Zeyer (Osthoff, 50), Steffen, Hirsch, Salou, Spies (Hajto, 84).

- 30 July 1997 / MSV Duisburg – FC Dynamo Moscow 3–1 (Wohlert 10' 12' Gill 89' (pen.) – Kobelev 37' Kovtun (yellow card) 54' (yellow-red card) 60' Teryokhin (yellow card) 82' (yellow-red card) 82') / Wedaustadion, Duisburg / Attendance: 8,650

MSV Duisburg: Gill, Hopp (Wolters, 72), Hirsch, Wohlert, Hajto, Komljenović, Osthoff, Salou, Neun, Zeyer (Spies, 58), Emmerling.
FC Dynamo: Tiapushkin, Tochilin (Gusev, 56), Kovtun, Ostrovskiy, Shtanyuk, Kobelev (captain), Kutsenko (Kosolapov, 60), Skokov, Kulchiy, Nekrasov, Teryokhin.

== 1998–99 UEFA Cup ==
Manager: Aleksei Petrushin.

=== Second qualifying round ===
- 11 August 1998 / Polonia Warsaw (Poland) – FC Dynamo Moscow 0–1 (Gusev 54') / Stadion Polonii Warszawa, Warsaw / Attendance: 2,500

Polonia Warsaw: Szczęsny, Sadzawicki, Žvirgždauskas, Gałuszka, Dąbrowski, Moskal (Mikulėnas, 58), Wdowczyk (Żewłakow, 88), Jałocha, Olisadebe, Vencevičius (Bąk, 77), Wędzyński.
FC Dynamo: Kramarenko, Yakhimovich, Korablyov (Šemberas, 80), Ostrovskiy, Shtanyuk, Kobelev (captain) (Golovskoy, 55), Gusev, Romaschenko, Nekrasov, Isibor, Danilevičius.

- 25 August 1998 / FC Dynamo Moscow – Polonia Warsaw 1–0 (Teryokhin 89') / Dynamo Stadium, Moscow / Attendance: 4,600

FC Dynamo: Tiapushkin, Yakhimovich, Korablyov (Golovskoy, 46), Ostrovskiy, Shtanyuk, Kobelev (captain) (Skokov, 90), Gusev, Romaschenko, Nekrasov, Danilevičius (Kulchiy, 61), Teryokhin.
Polonia Warsaw: Szczęsny, Sadzawicki, Žvirgždauskas, Żewłakow, Gałuszka, Wędzyński, Dąbrowski, Mikulėnas (Moskal, 81), Wdowczyk (Jałocha, 67), Bartczak, Olisadebe (Bąk, 70).

=== First round ===
- 15 September 1998 / FC Dynamo Moscow – Skonto FC (Latvia) 2–2 (Golovskoy 2' Ostrovskiy 70' – Miholaps 39' Pahars 50') / Dynamo Stadium, Moscow / Attendance: 5,000

FC Dynamo: Tiapushkin, Yakhimovich, Kovtun (Ostrovskiy, 46), Golovskoy, Shtanyuk, Kobelev (captain), Gusev, Romaschenko (Skokov, 36; Danilevičius, 76), Nekrasov, Isibor, Teryokhin.
Skonto FC: Karavajevs, Zemļinskis, Lobaņovs, Rekhviashvili, Pahars, Babicevs, Miholaps (Rimkus, 75), Melnyk (Pindeyev, 67), Rubins, Laizāns, Tereškinas (Līdaks, 52).

- 29 September 1998 / Skonto FC – FC Dynamo Moscow 2–3 (Pahars 75' 89' – Gusev 17' Līdaks 60' (o.g.) Teryokhin 76') / Daugava Stadium, Riga / Attendance: 4,500

Skonto FC: Karavajevs, Laizāns, Zemļinskis, Lobaņovs, Tereškinas, Bleidelis, Līdaks (Rubins, 63), Astafjevs, Pahars, Babicevs, Miholaps (Rimkus, 63).
FC Dynamo: Tiapushkin, Golovskoy (Šemberas, 81), Kovtun, Ostrovskiy, Shtanyuk, Kobelev (captain), S. Grishin (Tochilin, 75), Gusev, Nekrasov, Danilevičius (Romaschenko, 54), Teryokhin.

=== Second round ===
- 20 October 1998 / FC Dynamo Moscow – Real Sociedad (Spain) 2–3 (Nekrasov 72' 73' Shtanyuk (red card) 89' – Kovtun 3' (o.g.) de Pedro 11' 34' (pen.)) / Dynamo Stadium, Moscow / Attendance: 8,000

FC Dynamo: Tiapushkin (Kramarenko, 14), Yakhimovich, Kovtun, Šemberas (Romaschenko, 79), Shtanyuk, Kobelev (captain), S. Grishin, Gusev, Nekrasov, Danilevičius (Isibor, 46), Teryokhin.
Real Sociedad: Alberto, Aranzábal, Gómez, Loren, Sá Pinto (Adepoju, 46), Kovačević, de Pedro (Gracia, 68), Antía, López Rekarte, Aldeondo (de Paula, 83), Kühbauer.

- 3 November 1998 / Real Sociedad – FC Dynamo Moscow 3–0 (Kovačević 56' 76' de Paula 70') / Estadio Anoeta, San Sebastián / Attendance: 16,000

Real Sociedad: Alberto, Aranzábal, Antía, Gómez, Loren, Sá Pinto, Kovačević (Idiakez, 78), de Pedro, de Paula (Cvitanović, 73), López Rekarte, Kühbauer (Jauregi, 82).
FC Dynamo: Tiapushkin, Yakhimovich (Tochilin, 46), Kovtun, Ostrovskiy, Golovskoy (Šemberas, 84), Kobelev (captain), Romaschenko, Gusev, Nekrasov, Isibor (Kulchiy, 55), Teryokhin.

== 2000–01 UEFA Cup ==
Manager: Valery Gazzaev.

=== First round ===
- 14 September 2000 / Lillestrøm SK (Norway) – FC Dynamo Moscow 3–1 (Kristinsson 8' 14' Kihlberg 68' – Romaschenko 43') / Åråsen stadion, Lillestrøm / Attendance: 3,500

Lillestrøm SK: Misund, Bjarmann, Hansén, Kihlberg, Fjeldstad (Hjartarson, 90), Kristinsson, Helland, Berget, Sundgot, Werni, Berntsen.
FC Dynamo: Tumilovich, Yakhimovich, Šemberas, Tochilin, Romaschenko, Ayupov, Gusev (captain), Medvedev, Gogniyev (Česnauskis, 90), Bystrov (S. Grishin, 61), V. Grishin.

- 28 September 2000 / FC Dynamo Moscow – Lillestrøm SK 2–1 (Romaschenko 25' Shtanyuk 44' – Sundgot 70') / Dynamo Stadium, Moscow / Attendance: 5,000

FC Dynamo: Tumilovich, Šemberas, Tochilin, V. Grishin, Shtanyuk (captain), Romaschenko, Ayupov, Gusev, Bystrov, Medvedev (Česnauskis, 71), Gogniyev.
Lillestrøm SK: Baron, Bjarmann, Hansén, Strand (Powell, 46), Kihlberg, Fjeldstad (Helland, 90), Kristinsson, Berget, Sundgot, Werni, Berntsen.

== 2001–02 UEFA Cup ==
Manager: Aleksandr Novikov.

=== First round ===
- 20 September 2001 / FC Dynamo Moscow – Birkirkara F.C. (Malta) 1–0 (Khazov 21') / Dynamo Stadium, Moscow / Attendance: 4,000

FC Dynamo: Khomutovsky, Šemberas, Hornyák, Žutautas, Bystrov, Gusev (captain), Klyuyev, Khazov, Kharlachyov (Medvedev, 64; V. Grishin, 70), Novikov, Bulykin.
Birkirkara F.C: Savić, Tellus, Spiteri, Scicluna, Dronca, Suda, Camenzuli, Brincat, Calascione (Cutajar, 67), Nwoko, Zahra.

- 27 September 2001 / Birkirkara F.C. – FC Dynamo Moscow 0–0 / Ta' Qali Stadium, Ta' Qali / Attendance: 7,000

FC Dynamo: Khomutovsky, Šemberas, Tochilin, Hornyák, Žutautas, Novikov, Bystrov, Gusev (captain), Klyuyev (Česnauskis, 46), Khazov, V. Grishin.
Birkirkara F.C: Savić, Tellus, Scicluna, Spiteri, Dronca, Suda, Camenzuli, Nwoko, Calascione (Fenech, 79), Zahra, Galea (Cutajar, 68).

=== Second round ===
- 18 October 2001 / Rangers F.C. (Scotland) – FC Dynamo Moscow 3–1 (Amoruso 8' Ball 61' de Boer 79' – Gusev 90') / Ibrox Stadium, Glasgow / Attendance: 48,200

Rangers F.C.: Klos, Ricksen, Moore (Ball, 46), Amoruso, Numan, Konterman, Reyna, de Boer, Ferguson, Flo (McCann, 66), Caniggia.
FC Dynamo: Khomutovsky, Šemberas, Tochilin, Hornyák, Žutautas, Zharinov, Bystrov (Kharlachyov, 80), Gusev (captain), Bulykin (Medvedev, 46), V. Grishin (Dyatel, 86), Nemov.

- 1 November 2001 / FC Dynamo Moscow – Rangers F.C. 1–4 (Gusev 28' – R. de Boer 9' Khomutovsky 17' (o.g.) Flo 43' Løvenkrands 80') / Dynamo Stadium, Moscow / Attendance: 7,000

FC Dynamo: Khomutovsky, Šemberas, Tochilin, Hornyák, Žutautas, Bystrov (Nemov, 86), Gusev (captain) (Medvedev, 46), Novikov, Bulykin, V. Grishin, Dyatel (Česnauskis, 46).
Rangers F.C.: Klos, Ricksen, Moore, Amoruso, Numan, Ferguson, Caniggia (Latapy, 75), Flo (Mols, 80), Reyna, de Boer (Løvenkrands, 75), Konterman.

== UEFA Champions League 2009–10 ==
Manager: Andrei Kobelev.

=== Third qualifying round ===
- 29 July 2009 / Celtic F.C. (Scotland) – FC Dynamo Moscow 0–1 (Kokorin 7') / Celtic Park, Glasgow / Attendance: 55,000

Celtic F.C.: Boruc, Hinkel, Naylor, Caldwell, N'Guémo, McDonald (Killen, 61), Fortuné (Samaras, 60), Maloney, Donati (Fox, 67), Loovens, McGeady.
FC Dynamo: Gabulov, Kowalczyk, Fernández, K. Kombarov, D. Kombarov, Kerzhakov, Granat, Wilkshire, Kolodin, Svezhov, Kokorin (Smolov, 74).

- 5 August 2009 / FC Dynamo Moscow – Celtic F.C. 0–2 (McDonald 45' Samaras 90+1') / Arena Khimki, Khimki / Attendance: 13,753

FC Dynamo: Gabulov, Kowalczyk, Kolodin, Fernández (Ropotan, 90+4), Granat, K. Kombarov, Khokhlov, Wilkshire, Svezhov (Kokorin, 84), D. Kombarov, Kerzhakov.
Celtic F.C.: Boruc, Hinkel, Caldwell, N'Guémo, McDonald (Samaras, 79), Fortuné (Brown, 69), Fox, Maloney, Donati, Loovens, McGeady.

== UEFA Europa League 2009–10 ==
Manager: Andrei Kobelev.

=== Play-off round ===
- 20 August 2009 / PFC CSKA Sofia (Bulgaria) – FC Dynamo Moscow 0–0 / Vasil Levski National Stadium, Sofia / Attendance: 25,000

PFC CSKA: Karadzhov, Vidanov, Yanchev, Kotev, Timonov (Delev, 58), Orlinov (Zehirov, 62), Ivanov, Yanev (Paskov, 70), Todorov, Morozs, Minev.
FC Dynamo: Gabulov, Kowalczyk, Fernández, K. Kombarov, Khokhlov (Ropotan, 85), Kerzhakov, Granat, Wilkshire, Kolodin, Kokorin (Aguiar, 68), D. Kombarov.

- 27 August 2009 / FC Dynamo Moscow – PFC CSKA Sofia 1–2 (Kerzhakov 10' – Delev 14' Ivanov 55') / Arena Khimki, Khimki / Attendance: 8,486

FC Dynamo: Gabulov, Kowalczyk (Smolov, 61), Kolodin, Fernández, Granat (Kokorin, 57), K. Kombarov, Khokhlov, Wilkshire, Aguiar (Dimidko, 46), D. Kombarov, Kerzhakov.
PFC CSKA: Karadzhov, Vidanov, Yanchev, Kotev, Ivanov, Marquinhos (Timonov, 21), Todorov (Yanev, 75), Morozs, Minev, Stoyanov, Delev (Paskov, 85).

== UEFA Europa League 2012–13 ==
Manager: Sergei Silkin (first game, third qualifying round), Dmitri Khokhlov (caretaker, second game, third qualifying round), Dan Petrescu (play-off round).

=== Third qualifying round ===
- 2 August 2012 / Dundee United F.C. (Scotland) – FC Dynamo Moscow 2–2 (Flood 37' Watson 76' – Semshov 50' Kokorin 90+3') / Tannadice Park, Dundee / Attendance: 9,977

Dundee United: Cierzniak, Dillon, Douglas, Gunning, Flood, Russell, Rankin, Daly (captain), Ryan, Mackay-Steven, Watson.
FC Dynamo: Shunin, Schildenfeld, Dzsudzsák, Misimović, Kokorin, Semshov, Yusupov (Sapeta, 90+1), Kurányi (captain), Wilkshire, Lomić, Rykov.

- 9 August 2012 / FC Dynamo Moscow – Dundee United F.C. 5–0 (Semshov 2' Kokorin 23' Yusupov 40' Sapeta 83', 89') / Arena Khimki, Khimki / Attendance: 9,063

FC Dynamo: Berezovsky, Fernández, Dzsudzsák (Bakkal, 63), Misimović, Kokorin, Semshov, Yusupov (Sapeta, 64), Kurányi (captain), Wilkshire, Lomić, Rykov (Schildenfeld, 63).
Dundee United: Cierzniak, Douglas, McLean, Gunning, Flood, Russell (Gardyne, 78), Rankin (Armstrong, 59), Daly (captain), Ryan, Mackay-Steven (Dow, 86), Watson.

=== Play-off round ===
- 22 August 2012 / VfB Stuttgart (Germany) – FC Dynamo Moscow 2–0 (Ibišević 72', 90+1') / Mercedes-Benz Arena, Stuttgart / Attendance: 20,400

Stuttgart: Ulreich, Boka, Tasci (captain), Rodríguez, Hoogland, Kvist, Gentner, Okazaki (Traoré, 62), Hajnal (Cacau, 77), Harnik (Torun, 62), Ibišević.
FC Dynamo: Shunin, Lomić, Schildenfeld, Fernández, Wilkshire, Yusupov, Noboa, Dzsudzsák, Misimović (Semshov, 38), Nyakhaychyk (Granat, 85), Kurányi (captain) (Panyukov, 75).

- 28 August 2012 / FC Dynamo Moscow – VfB Stuttgart 1–1 (Kokorin 77' – Ibišević 64') / Arena Khimki, Khimki / Attendance: 9,000

FC Dynamo: Shunin, Granat, Schildenfeld, Fernández (captain), Chicherin, Noboa, Sapeta (Semshov, 61), Lomić, Kokorin, Dzsudzsák (Nyakhaychyk, 68), Kurányi (Misimović, 68).
Stuttgart: Ulreich, Boka (Molinaro, 74), Tasci (captain), Rodríguez, Sakai, Kvist, Gentner, Okazaki, Hajnal, Harnik (Torun, 68), Ibišević (Cacau, 68).

== UEFA Europa League 2014–15 ==
Manager: Stanislav Cherchesov

=== Third qualifying round ===
- 31 July 2014 / FC Dynamo Moscow – Ironi Kiryat Shmona (Israel) 1–1 (Kurányi 71' – Kola 63') / Arena Khimki, Khimki / Attendance: 7,583

FC Dynamo: Gabulov, Büttner, Samba, Vainqueur, Dzsudzsák, Ionov, Granat (captain), Noboa (Kokorin, 54), Kurányi, Manolev, Denisov.
Ironi Kiryat Shmona: Haimov, Kassio, Tzedek (captain), Dilmoni, Abed (Mizrahi, 84), Kola (Mayo, 90+2), Manga (Rochet, 71), Elkayam, Broun, Panka, Kahat.

- 7 August 2014 / Ironi Kiryat Shmona – FC Dynamo Moscow 1–2 (Kahat 11' – Kurányi 22' (pen.) Ionov 30') / GSP Stadium, Nicosia (Israeli clubs were playing their home games at neutral field due to Israel–Gaza conflict) / Attendance: 464

Ironi Kiryat Shmona: Haimov, Kassio, Tzedek (captain), Dilmoni (Pinas, 72), Abed (Rochet, 84), Kola, Manga, Elkayam, Broun, Panka (Mizrahi, 75), Kahat.
FC Dynamo: Berezovsky, Büttner, Samba, Vainqueur, Dzsudzsák (Zhirkov, 68), Kokorin, Ionov (Smolov, 62), Granat (captain), Kurányi (Noboa, 58), Kozlov, Denisov.

=== Play-off round ===
- 21 August 2014 / FC Dynamo Moscow – Omonia (Cyprus) 2–2 (Samba 33' Büttner 72' – Lobjanidze 2' Fofana 59') / Arena Khimki, Khimki / Attendance: 6,381

FC Dynamo: Berezovsky, Samba, Douglas, Vainqueur, Dzsudzsák, Kokorin (yellow card) 43' (yellow-red card) 62', Ionov (Büttner, 36), Granat (captain), Valbuena (Manolev, 90), Kurányi, Denisov.
Omonia: Moreira (captain), Lobjanidze, Stepanov, Rodri, Cristóvão, Nuno Assis (Grigalashvili, 77), Fofana (Kyriakou, 86), Margaça, Poté (Roberto, 71), Serginho, Acquistapace.

- 28 August 2014 / Omonia – FC Dynamo Moscow 1–2 (Poté 23' – Stepanov 11' (o.g.) Samba 90+3') / GSP Stadium, Nicosia / Attendance: 20,081

Omonia: Moreira (captain), Lobjanidze, Stepanov, Rodri, Cristóvão, Nuno Assis (Grigalashvili, 90), Fofana (Kyriakou, 86), Margaça, Poté (Roberto, 74), Serginho, Acquistapace.
FC Dynamo: Berezovsky, Büttner (Prudnikov, 83), Samba, Douglas, Vainqueur (yellow card) 34' (yellow-red card) 73', Dzsudzsák (Noboa, 75), Ionov (Zhirkov, 68), Valbuena, Kurányi, Manolev, Denisov (captain).

=== Group stage ===
- 18 September 2014 / Panathinaikos (Greece) – FC Dynamo Moscow 1–2 (Dinas 63' – Kokorin 40' Ionov 49') / Leoforos Alexandras Stadium, Athens / Attendance: 14,000

Panathinaikos: Kotsolis, Triantafyllopoulos, Mendes da Silva, Klonaridis (Donis, 58), Lagos (Petrić, 75), Zeca (captain), Karelis, Nano, Schildenfeld, Dinas, Pranjić (Koutroumpis, 80).
FC Dynamo Moscow: Gabulov, Büttner (Granat, 69), Samba, Douglas, Dzsudzsák, Yusupov, Kokorin (Hubočan, 89), Ionov, Noboa, Kurányi (captain) (Prudnikov, 90+3), Manolev.

- 2 October 2014 / FC Dynamo Moscow – PSV Eindhoven (Netherlands) 1–0 (Zhirkov 90+3') / Arena Khimki, Khimki / Attendance: 7,872

FC Dynamo Moscow: Gabulov, Büttner, Samba, Douglas, Vainqueur, Dzsudzsák (Zhirkov, 61), Yusupov, Kokorin (captain), Ionov (Valbuena, 73), Hubočan, Noboa (Kurányi, 68).
PSV Eindhoven: Zoet, Rekik, Arias, Bruma, Maher (Ritzmaier, 86), Wijnaldum (captain), Narsingh, Jozefzoon (Vloet, 84), Willems, Locadia, Hendrix.

- 23 October 2014 / Estoril (Portugal) – FC Dynamo Moscow 1–2 (Yohan Tavares 90+5' – Kokorin 52' Zhirkov 80') / Estádio António Coimbra da Mota, Estoril / Attendance: 2,164

Estoril: Vagner (captain), Yohan Tavares, Bruno Miguel, Anderson Luiz, Kléber (penalty missed) (Cabrera, 81), Esiti, Sebá (Ricardo Vaz, 85), Kuca, Diogo Amado, Rúben Fernandes, Tozé (Arthuro, 77).
FC Dynamo Moscow: Gabulov, Büttner, Samba, Douglas, Vainqueur, Kokorin (Kurányi, 75), Ionov (Zhirkov, 56), Valbuena (Rotenberg, 90+2), Kozlov, Denisov (captain).

- 6 November 2014 / FC Dynamo Moscow – Estoril 1–0 (Kurányi 77') / Arena Khimki, Khimki / Attendance: 5,374

FC Dynamo Moscow: Gabulov, Büttner, Samba, Douglas, Vainqueur, Dzsudzsák (Zhirkov, 76), Kokorin (captain) (Kurányi, 74), Ionov, Valbuena (Yusupov, 86), Hubočan, Denisov.
Estoril: Kieszek, Yohan Tavares (captain), Anderson Luiz (Filipe Gonçalves, 87), Kléber (Bruno Lopes, 73), Esiti, Sebá, Kuca, Emídio Rafael, Diogo Amado (Ricardo Vaz, 82), Rúben Fernandes, Tozé.

- 27 November 2014 / FC Dynamo Moscow – Panathinaikos 2–1 (Triantafyllopoulos 55' (o.g.) Ionov 61' – Berg 14') / Arena Khimki, Khimki / Attendance: 4,207

FC Dynamo Moscow: Gabulov, Büttner, Samba, Douglas, Vainqueur, Ionov (Dzsudzsák, 81), Valbuena, Noboa, Zhirkov (Yusupov, 73), Kurányi (captain) (Prudnikov, 88), Rotenberg.
Panathinaikos: Kotsolis, Triantafyllopoulos, Mendes da Silva (Pranjić, 86), Lagos (captain), Berg (Klonaridis, 78), Bajrami, Donis, Nano, Schildenfeld, Bourbos (Koutroumpis, 56), Petrić.

- 11 December 2014 / PSV Eindhoven – FC Dynamo Moscow 0–1 (Ionov 90') / Philips Stadion, Eindhoven / Attendance: 25,000

PSV Eindhoven: Pasveer, Isimat-Mirin, Rekik, Maher (Wijnaldum, 81), Depay (de Jong, 67), Jozefzoon, Willems, Locadia, Guardado (captain), Brenet, Hendrix (Ritzmaier, 67).
FC Dynamo Moscow: Shunin, Douglas, Vainqueur (Ionov, 59), Dzsudzsák (Tashayev, 90+3), Yusupov, Valbuena, Hubočan, Noboa, Kurányi (captain) (Prudnikov, 68), Manolev, Kozlov.

=== Round of 32 ===
- 19 February 2015 / Anderlecht (Belgium) – FC Dynamo Moscow 0–0 / Constant Vanden Stock Stadium, Anderlecht / Attendance: 17,317

Anderlecht: Proto (captain), N'Sakala, Deschacht, Najar, Rolando, Defour (Colin, 67), Acheampong (Kabasele, 86), Tielemans, Dendoncker, Vanden Borre (Leya Iseka, 83), Mitrović.
FC Dynamo Moscow: Gabulov, Büttner (yellow card) 58' (yellow-red card) 75', Samba, Vainqueur, Dzsudzsák (Zhirkov, 69), Yusupov, Kokorin (captain), Valbuena (Ionov, 80), Hubočan, Kurányi (Denisov, 51), Kozlov.

- 26 February 2015 / FC Dynamo Moscow – Anderlecht 3–1 (Kozlov 47' Yusupov 64' Kurányi 90+5' – Mitrović 29') / Arena Khimki, Khimki / Attendance: 12,316

FC Dynamo Moscow: Gabulov, Samba, Vainqueur, Dzsudzsák (Ionov, 68), Yusupov, Kokorin (captain) (penalty missed) , Valbuena (Kurányi, 84), Hubočan, Zhirkov, Kozlov (Douglas, 53), Denisov.
Anderlecht: Proto (captain), N'Sakala, Deschacht, Rolando, Defour, Acheampong, Conté (Cyriac, 81), Tielemans (Najar, 71), Dendoncker (Leya Iseka, 81), Vanden Borre, Mitrović.

=== Round of 16 ===
- 12 March 2015 / Napoli (Italy) – FC Dynamo Moscow 3–1 (Higuaín 25', 31' (pen.), 55' – Kurányi 2') / Stadio San Paolo, Naples / Attendance: 17,727

Napoli: Andújar, Henrique, Britos, de Guzmán (Hamšík, 70), Callejón (Zúñiga, 82), Jorginho, Higuaín, Mertens, Koulibaly (Albiol, 8), Ghoulam, Inler (captain).
FC Dynamo Moscow: Gabulov, Samba, Vainqueur, Dzsudzsák (Tashayev, 90+2), Kokorin (captain), Valbuena (Ionov, 72), Hubočan, Zhirkov, Kurányi (Büttner, 62), Kozlov, Zobnin (yellow card) 32' (yellow-red card) 46'.

- 19 March 2015 / FC Dynamo Moscow – Napoli 0–0 / Arena Khimki, Khimki / Attendance: 17,356

FC Dynamo Moscow: Gabulov, Büttner (Ionov, 85), Samba, Vainqueur, Dzsudzsák, Kokorin (captain), Valbuena, Hubočan, Zhirkov, Kurányi, Kozlov.
Napoli: Andújar, Britos, Callejón, Jorginho, Higuaín (Zúñiga, 81), Maggio (captain), Mertens (de Guzmán, 63), David López, Gabbiadini (Hamšík, 71), Ghoulam, Albiol.

== UEFA Europa League 2020–21 ==
Manager: Kirill Novikov.

=== Second qualifying round ===
- 17 September 2020 / Lokomotive Tbilisi (Georgia (country)) - Dynamo 2–1 (Sikharulidze 54' Gavashelishvili 76' – Komlichenko 90' (pen.)) / Mikheil Meskhi Stadium, Tbilisi / Attendance: 0 (due to COVID-19 pandemic in Europe)

FC Lokomotive Tbilisi: Mamardashvili, Sandokhadze, Gabadze, Gureshidze, Ubilava, Shonia, Samurkasovi (Dzebniauri, 62), Kirkitadze (Kobakhidze, 83), Dartsmelia, Oulad Omar (Gavashelishvili, 65), Sikharulidze.
FC Dynamo: Shunin, Parshivlyuk, Ordets, Skopintsev (Morozov, 46), Yevgenyev, Kaboré, Philipp (Igboun, 69), Fomin, Szymański, N'Jie (Lesovoy, 61), Komlichenko.

Note: The qualifying rounds were played in one-leg format due to COVID-19 pandemic in Europe.
