= Romanek =

Romanek is a surname. Notable people with the surname include:

- János Romanek (born 1966), Hungarian footballer
- Łukasz Romanek (1983–2006), Polish motorsport racer
- Mark Romanek (born 1959), American filmmaker
- Stan Romanek (born 1962), American writer, UFO-hoax con-artist, and convicted sex offender.
