= Tomáš Urban =

Tomáš Urban may refer to:

- Tomáš Urban (footballer) (born 1968), football (soccer) player
- Tomáš Urban (handballer) (born 1989), Slovak handball player; see 2022 European Men's Handball Championship
- Tomáš Urban (ice hockey) (born 1985), Czech ice hockey player

== See also ==
- Thomas Urban
- Tom Urbani
- Thomas Urbain
