= Vladimir Fomichyov =

Russian footballer (1960–2019)

Personal information
- Full name: Vladimir Alekseyevich Fomichyov
- Date of birth: 15 August 1960
- Place of birth: Stalinogorsk, Russian SFSR, Soviet Union
- Date of death: 15 August 2019 (aged 59)
- Place of death: Moscow, Russia
- Height: 1.82 m (5 ft 11 1/2 in)
- Positions: Defender; forward

Senior career*
Years	Team	Apps	(Gls)
1977	FC Khimik Novomoskovsk	19	(0)
1978–1982	FC Torpedo Moscow	9	(0)
1982–1983	FC Kuban Krasnodar	64	(0)
1984–1985	FC Dynamo Moscow	41	(1)
1986	FC Dynamo Vologda	19	(0)
1986–1990	FC Kuzbass Kemerovo	133	(1)
1990–1992	FC Asmaral Moscow	81	(7)
1992	FC Presnya Moscow	3	(0)
- * Club domestic league appearances and goals

Vladimir Alekseyevich Fomichyov (Russian: Владимир Алексеевич Фомичёв; 15 August 1960 – 15 August 2019) was a Russian professional footballer.

== Club career ==
He made his professional debut in the Soviet Top League in 1980 for FC Torpedo Moscow. He played 6 games and scored 1 goal in the European Cup Winners' Cup 1984–85 for FC Dynamo Moscow.

== Honours ==
- Soviet Cup winner: 1984.
