= Renat Ataullin =

Russian footballer

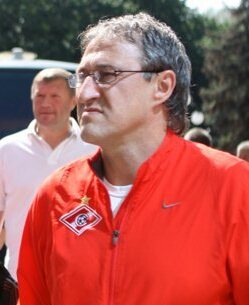

Personal information
- Full name: Renat Nurullayevich Ataullin
- Date of birth: 2 May 1965 (age 61)
- Place of birth: Moscow, Russian SFSR
- Height: 1.76 m (5 ft 9 1/2 in)
- Position: Midfielder

Senior career*
Years	Team	Apps	(Gls)
1982	FC Dynamo Moscow	0	(0)
1982–1983	FC Dynamo Kashira	39	(5)
1984–1985	FC Dynamo Moscow	52	(1)
1986	FC Spartak Moscow	15	(0)
1987–1989	FC Lokomotiv Moscow	80	(1)
1989	FC Torpedo Moscow	4	(0)
1990–1992	FC Winterthur		
1992	FC Dynamo-d Moscow	23	(4)
1993–1994	FC Arsenal Tula	27	(4)
1995	FC Sokol-PZhD Saratov	13	(0)
1996	FC Munaishy	19	(0)
1997	FC Saturn Ramenskoye	11	(0)
- * Club domestic league appearances and goals

Renat Nurullayevich Ataullin (Russian: Ренат Нуруллаевич Атауллин; born 2 May 1965) is a former Russian professional footballer.

== Club career ==
He made his debut in the Soviet Top League in 1984 for FC Dynamo Moscow. He played 2 games for FC Spartak Moscow in the UEFA Cup 1986–87.

== Honours ==
- Soviet Top League bronze: 1986.
- Soviet Cup finalist: 1989.
