= Jozef Džubara =

Slovak footballer

Personal information
- Date of birth: 15 May 1965 (age 61)
- Place of birth: Bratislava
- Position: Defender

Senior career*
Years	Team	Apps	(Gls)
1990–1993	1. FC Tatran Prešov		
1993–1996	SK Hradec Králové		
1996–1999	FC Tauris Rimavská Sobota		
- * Club domestic league appearances and goals

Jozef Džubara (born 15 May 1965) is a retired Slovak football defender.
