= Anatoli Parov =

Soviet footballer

Personal information
- Full name: Anatoli Vasilyevich Parov
- Date of birth: 17 September 1956
- Place of birth: Moscow, USSR
- Date of death: 28 September 2013 (aged 57)
- Place of death: Moscow, Russia
- Height: 1.75 m (5 ft 9 in)
- Position: Defender

Youth career
- FC Dynamo Moscow

Senior career*
Years	Team	Apps	(Gls)
1975–1980	FC Dynamo Moscow	75	(0)
1981–1983	FC Lokomotiv Moscow	66	(0)
1984	FC Moskvich Moscow		
1985	FC Dynamo Kashira	29	(0)
1986–1988	FC Torpedo Kurgan	95	(7)
1990	FC Zauralye Kurgan	4	(0)
Total		209	(7)

International career
1976	USSR	2	(0)
- * Club domestic league appearances and goals

Anatoli Vasilyevich Parov (Russian: Анатолий Васильевич Паров; 17 September 1956 – 28 September 2013) was a Soviet football player.

== Honours ==
- Soviet Top League winner: 1976 (spring).
- Soviet Cup winner: 1977.

== International career ==
Born in Moscow, Parov made his debut for USSR on 28 November 1976 in a friendly against Argentina.
