= Waldemar Prusik =

Polish footballer

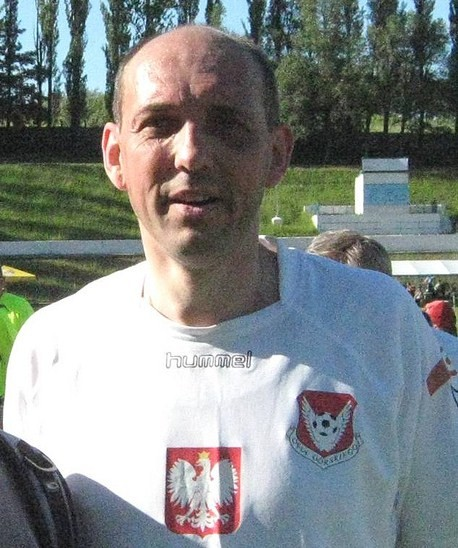
- Prusik in 2009

Personal information
- Full name: Waldemar Krzysztof Prusik
- Date of birth: 27 July 1961 (age 65)
- Place of birth: Wrocław, Poland
- Height: 1.85 m (6 ft 1 in)
- Position: Midfielder

Youth career
- Śląsk Wrocław

Senior career*
Years	Team	Apps	(Gls)
1981–1989	Śląsk Wrocław	243	(27)
1989–1990	Alemannia Aachen	10	(1)
1990–1993	K.R.C. Mechelen	70	(7)
Total		323	(35)

International career
1983–1991	Poland	49	(5)

Managerial career
- 1996: Śląsk Wrocław (caretaker)
- * Club domestic league appearances and goals

Waldemar Prusik (born 27 July 1961) is a Polish former professional footballer who played as a midfielder.

== Career statistics ==
=== International ===
Appearances and goals by national team and year
National team	Year	Apps	Goals
Poland	1983	3	0
Poland	1984	2	0
Poland	1985	7	2
Poland	1986	4	0
Poland	1987	10	2
Poland	1988	7	1
Poland	1989	8	0
Poland	1990	6	0
Poland	1991	2	0
Total		49	5

== Honours ==
Śląsk Wrocław

- Polish Cup: 1986–87
