= Aleš Hynek =

Czech footballer (born 1968)

Personal information
- Date of birth: 4 June 1968 (age 58)
- Position: Defender

Senior career*
Years	Team	Apps	(Gls)
1994–1995	FK Švarc Benešov		
1995–1996	SK Hradec Králové		
1996–1998	FC Petra Drnovice		
1998–2000	Dukla Příbram		
- * Club domestic league appearances and goals

Aleš Hynek (born 4 June 1968) is a retired Czech football defender.
