= Hayk Harutyunyan =

Armenian footballer

Personal information
- Date of birth: 10 December 1974 (age 51)
- Position: Midfielder

Senior career*
| Years | Team | Apps | (Gls) |
| 1990–1993 | FC Malatia-Kilikia | | |
| 1994–1995 | FC Ararat Yerevan | | |
| 1996–1997 | FC Kotayk | | |
| 1996 | → FC Ararat Yerevan | | |
| 1998–1999 | FC Tsement | | |
| 1999 | FC Solothurn | | |
| 2000 | FC Araks Ararat | | |
| 2001 | FC Pyunik | | |
| 2001–2002 | FC Mika | | |
| 2002–2003 | FC Kotayk | | |

International career
| 1998–1999 | Armenia | 6 | (0) |
- * Club domestic league appearances and goals

Hayk Harutyunyan (born 10 December 1974) is a retired Armenian football midfielder.
