= Vadim Pavlenko =

Russian footballer

Personal information
- Full name: Vadim Ivanovich Pavlenko
- Date of birth: 31 January 1955
- Place of birth: Moscow, Russian SFSR
- Date of death: 6 October 2000 (aged 45)
- Place of death: Moscow, Russia
- Height: 1.83 m (6 ft 0 in)
- Position: Forward

Senior career*
Years	Team	Apps	(Gls)
1972–1976	FC Dynamo Moscow	51	(18)
1977–1978	FC Spartak Moscow	47	(16)
1979	FC Terek Grozny	21	(8)
1979	FC Dynamo Moscow	3	(0)
1980–1981	FC Dnipro Dnipropetrovsk	45	(21)
1982	FC Spartak Kostroma	7	(0)
- * Club domestic league appearances and goals

Vadim Ivanovich Pavlenko (Russian: Вадим Иванович Павленко; 31 January 1955 – 6 October 2000) was a Russian professional footballer.

== Club career ==
He made his professional debut in the Soviet Top League in 1974 for FC Dynamo Moscow.

== Honours ==
- Soviet Top League champion: 1976 (spring).

== European club competitions ==
With FC Dynamo Moscow.

- UEFA Cup 1974–75: 4 games, 1 goal.
- UEFA Cup 1976–77: 1 game.
- European Cup Winners' Cup 1979–80: 2 games.
