= Vladimir Kozlov (footballer) =

Soviet footballer and Russian coach

Personal information
- Full name: Vladimir Vladimirovich Kozlov
- Date of birth: 4 March 1946 (age 80)
- Place of birth: Moscow, USSR
- Height: 1.75 m (5 ft 9 in)
- Position: Centre-forward

Youth career
- 1962: CDSA Moscow

Senior career*
Years	Team	Apps	(Gls)
1966	FC Lokomotiv Moscow	35	(14)
1967–1976	FC Dynamo Moscow	180	(58)

International career
1968, 1973	USSR	2	(0)

Managerial career
- 1978–: FC Dynamo Moscow (youth teams)
- 1986: FC Dynamo-2 Moscow (assistant)
- * Club domestic league appearances and goals

Vladimir Vladimirovich Kozlov (Russian: Владимир Владимирович Козлов; born 4 March 1946) is a retired Soviet football player and a current Russian coach. He coaches the youth team of FC Dynamo Moscow.

== Honours ==
- Soviet Top League runner-up: 1967, 1970.
- Soviet Cup winner: 1967, 1970.
- UEFA Cup Winners' Cup finalist: 1972.
- Top 33 players year-end list: 1968, 1969, 1970.

== International career ==
Kozlov made his debut for USSR on 16 June 1968 in a friendly against Austria.
