= Claus Boden =

German footballer

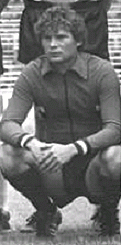
- Claus Boden, 1980

Personal information
- Date of birth: 7 October 1951 (age 75)
- Height: 1.75 m (5 ft 9 in)
- Position: Goalkeeper

Senior career*
| Years | Team | Apps | (Gls) |
- BSG Empor Tabak Dresden
| 1968-1982 | SG Dynamo Dresden | 153 | (0) |
| 1982-88 | BSG Stahl Riesa | 129 | (2) |

International career
| 1972–1974 | East Germany U23 | | |
- * Club domestic league appearances and goals

Claus Boden (born 7 October 1951) was a goalkeeper in the Oberliga, East Germany's top division. He played there for Dynamo Dresden and Stahl Riesa. Boden appeared 16 times for the East German under-23 national team.

== Club career ==
Boden started his club career with BSG Empor Tabak Dresden. He later changed club colors within his home town and played from 1968 onwards for SG Dynamo Dresden. In the 1971/72 season he replaced Manfred Kallenbach as goalkeeper of Dresden's first team and participated in the final of East German cup on 14 May 1972. The game ended 1-2 against FC Carl Zeiss Jena. In 1973, he won his first title, the East German football champion. Overall, he was East German champions with Dynamo Dresden four times. In 1977 he won the FDGB-Pokal Cup after a 3-0 victory on 28 May over 1. FC Lokomotive Leipzig.

In the championship years 1975/1976 and 1976/77 he played 26 or 22 matches as goalkeeper of Dynamo Dresden. He played 153 league, 47 national cup and 39 European matches for Dresden until the 1981/82 season.

Boden moved at the beginning of the 1982/83 season to BSG Stahl Riesa, which was relegated from the first division two years before. At the end of the season Stahl Riesa were promoted to the Oberliga again. He stayed with this team until 1988. He made another 129 top league appearances, so its record increased to a total of 282 East German top-flight matches. He scored two goals in the Oberliga from the penalty spot.

== International career ==
From 1972 to 1974, he was a member of the East German under-23 team which won the silver medal at the 1974 UEFA European Under-23 Championship. The team reached the final after victories against Italy and Poland in the kock-out stages but lost eventually against Hungary.

== Career after pro times ==
With the end of the 1987/88 season he finished his playing career. He later worked as a goalkeeping coach, for example for TSV 1860 Munich.
