= Vladimir Dolbonosov (footballer, born 1949) =

Soviet footballer

Personal information
- Full name: Vladimir Nikolayevich Dolbonosov
- Date of birth: 8 April 1949
- Place of birth: Moscow, Russian SFSR
- Date of death: 25 September 2014 (aged 65)
- Place of death: Moscow, Russia
- Height: 1.81 m (5 ft 11 1/2 in)
- Position: Defender

Senior career*
Years	Team	Apps	(Gls)
1967–1975	FC Dynamo Moscow	151	(2)
1976	FC Pakhtakor Tashkent	15	(1)

Managerial career
- 1992–1995: FC Dynamo-Gazovik Tyumen (president)
- 1998: FC Tyumen (general director)
- 1999–2000: FC Torpedo-ZIL Moscow (director)
- 2001: FC Arsenal Tula (director)
- * Club domestic league appearances and goals as of 1 January 2009

Vladimir Nikolayevich Dolbonosov (Russian: Владимир Николаевич Долбоносов; 8 April 1949 – 25 September 2014) was a Soviet professional footballer.

== Club career ==
He made his debut in the Soviet Top League in 1967 for FC Dynamo Moscow.

== Honours ==
- European Cup Winners' Cup 1971–72 finalist.
- Soviet Top League runner-up: 1967, 1970.
- Soviet Top League bronze: 1973.
- Soviet Cup winner: 1970.
