= Martin Brunner =

Swiss footballer (born 1963)

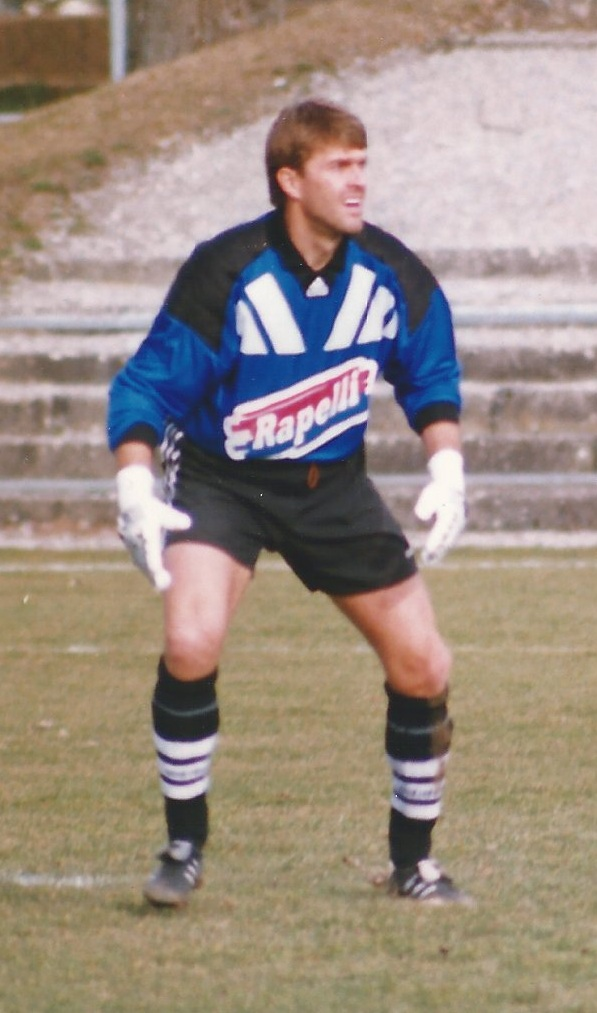
Martin Brunner.

Martin Brunner (born 23 April 1963 in Zürich) is a retired Swiss football goalkeeper, who was capped 36 times for the Swiss national team. He was an unused substitute at the 1994 FIFA World Cup.

== Clubs ==
- 1983–1994: (Switzerland) Grasshopper Club Zürich
- 1994–1999: (Switzerland) Lausanne Sports

== Honours ==
Grasshoppers

- Swiss Championship: 1983–84, 1989–90, 1990–91
- Swiss Cup: 1987–88, 1988–89, 1989–90, 1993–94
- Swiss Super Cup: 1989
