= Michael Cutajar =

Maltese footballer

Personal information
- Full name: Michael Cutajar
- Date of birth: 14 February 1971 (age 55)
- Place of birth: Malta
- Height: 1.68 m (5 ft 6 in)
- Position: Striker

Senior career*
| Years | Team | Apps | (Gls) |
| 1988–1996 | Rabat Ajax | 70 | (12) |
- Lija Athletic
| 1996–2002 | Birkirkara | 142 | (33) |
| 2002 | Marsaxlokk | 5 | (1) |
| 2003 | Marsa | 4 | (0) |
| 2005–2008 | Dingli Swallows | | |

International career^{‡}
- Malta U16
- Malta U21
| 1992–2000 | Malta | 33 | (1) |
- * Club domestic league appearances and goals as of 16 February 2010 ‡ National team caps and goals as of 16 February 2010

Michael Cutajar (born 14 February 1971) was a professional footballer who played for Rabat Ajax, Birkirkara, Marsaxlokk, Marsa and Dingli Swallows. During his career, he played as a midfielder, and also sometimes as a striker.

== International goal ==
Scores and results list Malta's goal tally first.

| No | Date | Venue | Opponent | Score | Result | Competition |
|---|---|---|---|---|---|---|
| 1. | 28 April 1999 | National Stadium, Ta' Qali, Malta | Iceland | 1–1 | 1–2 | Friendly match |

== Honours ==
Birkirkara

- 1999/00 Maltese Premier League
