= Karel Urbánek (footballer) =

Czech footballer (1972–2007)

Personal information
- Date of birth: 14 April 1972
- Date of death: 11 May 2007 (aged 35)
- Height: 1.80 m (5 ft 11 in)
- Position: Defender

Senior career*
Years	Team	Apps	(Gls)
1990–1991	TJ Slovan Elitex Liberec		
1991–1997	SK Hradec Králové	151	(6)
1998	FC Petra Drnovice	12	(0)
1999	FK Svit Zlín	2	(0)
1999	FC Lokomotiv Nizhny Novgorod	21	(0)
2000	FK Jablonec 97	4	(0)
2000–2001	1. FC Košice	6	(0)
2002–2003	SK Slovan Varnsdorf		
- * Club domestic league appearances and goals

Karel Urbánek (14 April 1972 – 11 May 2007) was a Czech football player.

== Career ==
In 1999, Urbanek signed for Russian club FC Lokomotiv Nizhny Novgorod but did not like the conditions there.

== Style of play ==
According to former Hradec Kralove coach Petr Pálka, Urbanek was two-footed and good at heading.

== Honours ==
Hradec Králové

- Czech Cup winner: 1994/95
