= Håkan Arvidsson =

Swedish footballer (born 1953)

Personal information
- Full name: Håkan Arvidsson
- Date of birth: 14 April 1953 (age 73)
- Place of birth: Jönköping, Sweden
- Position: Defender

Senior career*
Years	Team	Apps	(Gls)
1973–1974	Kalmar FF	26	(0)
1974-1981	Östers IF	163	(1)
1981	Vederslöv/Dännigelanda IF	13	(0)
1981-1987	Kalmar FF	145	(1)

International career
1976-1980	Sweden	17	(0)
- * Club domestic league appearances and goals

Håkan Arvidsson (born 14 April 1953) is a Swedish former football player.

During his club career, Arvidsson played for Östers IF, Vederslöv/Dännigelanda IF and Kalmar FF.

Arvidsson made 17 appearances for the Sweden men's national football team, between 1976 and 1980.
