= Juha Riippa =

Finnish footballer (born 1968)

Juha Riippa (born 12 September 1968 in Kokkola) is a Finnish former football player, who played in defence and midfield. Riippa won the Finnish league championship in 1996 with FC Jazz.

Riippa played one international match for Finland in 1996.

== Clubs ==
- 1986–1989 FC Ilves (74 matches, 3 goals)
- 1990 KPV (23 matches, 1 goal)
- 1991 PPT (33 matches, 4 goals)
- 1992 FC Jazz (33 matches, 7 goals)
- 1994–1998 FC Jazz (119 matches, 20 goals)
- 1996 Hibernian (1 match)
- 1999 HJK (5 matches)
- 2000–2003 FC Jazz (89 matches, 7 goals)

== Honours ==
- Finnish league championship (1): 1996
