= Sergei Moiseyev =

Russian footballer

Personal information
- Full name: Sergei Vasilyevich Moiseyev
- Date of birth: 6 April 1959 (age 67)
- Place of birth: Moscow, Russian SFSR
- Height: 1.81 m (5 ft 11 1/2 in)
- Position: Forward

Youth career
- FC Dynamo Moscow

Senior career*
Years	Team	Apps	(Gls)
1978–1980	FC Dynamo Moscow	6	(0)
1981–1982	FC Dynamo Vologda	62	(26)
1983–1984	FC Znamya Truda Orekhovo-Zuyevo	51	(7)
- * Club domestic league appearances and goals

Sergei Vasilyevich Moiseyev (Russian: Серге́й Васильевич Моисеев; born 6 April 1959) is a former Russian professional footballer.

== Club career ==
He made his professional debut in the Soviet Top League in 1980 for FC Dynamo Moscow. He played 1 game in the UEFA Cup 1980–81 for FC Dynamo Moscow.
