= Anatoli Kozhemyakin =

Soviet footballer

Personal information
- Full name: Anatoli Yevgenyevich Kozhemyakin
- Date of birth: 24 February 1953
- Place of birth: Moscow, Russian SFSR
- Date of death: 13 October 1974 (aged 21)
- Place of death: Moscow, Russian SFSR
- Position: Striker

Youth career
- FC Lokomotiv Moscow

Senior career*
Years	Team	Apps	(Gls)
1969	FC Lokomotiv Moscow	0	(0)
1970–1974	FC Dynamo Moscow	62	(24)

International career
1972–1973	USSR	3	(0)
- * Club domestic league appearances and goals

Anatoli Yevgenyevich Kozhemyakin (Russian: Анатолий Евгеньевич Кожемякин, 24 February 1953 – 13 October 1974) was a Soviet football player. He died in a freak accident: he was stuck in an elevator, but was able to open the elevator doors; as he tried to climb out, the elevator started moving again and crushed him to death.

== Honours ==
- Soviet Top League bronze: 1973.
- Soviet Top League second-best scorer: 1973.
- UEFA Cup Winners' Cup finalist: 1972.
- Top 33 players year-end list: 1973.

== International career ==
Kozhemyakin made his debut for USSR on 29 March 1972 (aged 19) in a friendly against Bulgaria. He played in a 1974 FIFA World Cup qualifier against Chile. The USSR team did not go to the return game against Chile in protest against the Augusto Pinochet regime.
