= John Arvid Skistad =

Norwegian footballer (born 1968)

Personal information
- Date of birth: 25 April 1968 (age 58)
- Position: Defender

Senior career*
Years	Team	Apps	(Gls)
–1991	Lørenskog		
1992–2002	Stabæk		
2003	Moss		
2005	Skeid		
2006–?	Skårer		
- * Club domestic league appearances and goals

John Arvid Skistad (born 25 April 1968) is a retired Norwegian football defender.

Playing several seasons for Lørenskog, he joined Stabæk ahead of the 1992 season. He stayed for 11 seasons, playing 239 games in league, cup and European competitions. In 2003 he played for Moss, came out of retirement to play for Skeid in 2005, and then lowly Skårer from Lørenskog in 2006.
