= Emmanuel Karagiannis =

Belgian footballer

Personal information
- Date of birth: 22 November 1966 (age 59)
- Place of birth: Leut, Belgium
- Height: 1.75 m (5 ft 9 in)
- Position: Midfielder

Senior career*
Years	Team	Apps	(Gls)
1983–1986	Patro Eisden		
1986–1992	K.S.V. Waregem		
1992–1995	R.F.C. Seraing		
1995–1996	Anderlecht	20	(0)
1996–1997	Antwerp	27	(3)
1997–2001	Germinal Beerschot	107	(7)
2001–2002	La Louvière	20	(1)
2002–2004	Patro Eisden		

International career
1982–1983	Belgium U16	6	(0)
1982–1983	Belgium U17	4	(0)
1984	Belgium U18	1	(0)
1984–1985	Belgium U19	11	(0)
1986–1987	Belgium U21	6	(0)
1995–1998	Belgium	8	(1)
- * Club domestic league appearances and goals

Emmanuel Karagiannis (born 22 November 1966) is a Belgian former professional footballer who played as a midfielder. He made eight appearances for the Belgium national team from 1995 to 1998.
