= Aleksandr Molodtsov =

Russian footballer

Personal information
- Full name: Aleksandr Vasilyevich Molodtsov
- Date of birth: 1 March 1962 (age 64)
- Place of birth: Moscow, Russian SFSR
- Height: 1.72 m (5 ft 8 in)
- Positions: Midfielder; forward

Youth career
- FC Dynamo Moscow

Senior career*
| Years | Team | Apps | (Gls) |
| 1978–1987 | FC Dynamo Moscow | 127 | (13) |
| 1987 | FC Metalurh Zaporizhya | 27 | (2) |
| 1988 | FC Shinnik Yaroslavl | 8 | (0) |
| 1988 | FC Fakel Voronezh | 9 | (0) |
| 1989 | FC Spartak Kostroma | 4 | (1) |
| 1989–1990 | FC Volgar Astrakhan | 30 | (2) |
- * Club domestic league appearances and goals

Aleksandr Vasilyevich Molodtsov (Russian: Александр Васильевич Молодцов; born 1 March 1962) is a former Russian professional footballer.

== Club career ==
He made his professional debut in the Soviet Top League in 1980 for FC Dynamo Moscow.

== Honours ==
- Soviet Cup winner: 1984.
- Soviet Top League runner-up: 1986.

== European club competitions ==
With FC Dynamo Moscow.

- UEFA Cup 1982–83: 2 games.
- European Cup Winners' Cup 1984–85: 3 games.
