= Tummas Eli Hansen =

Faroese footballer (born 1966)

Personal information
- Date of birth: 11 February 1966 (age 60)
- Position: Defender

Senior career*
| Years | Team | Apps | (Gls) |
| –1997 | B36 Tórshavn | | |

International career
| 1989–1995 | Faroe Islands | 27 | (0) |
- * Club domestic league appearances and goals

Tummas Eli Hansen (born 11 February 1966) is a Faroese retired football defender.
