= Sergei Argudyayev =

Russian footballer

Personal information
- Full name: Sergei Nikolayevich Argudyayev
- Date of birth: 11 January 1963
- Place of birth: Kimry, Kalinin Oblast Russian SFSR
- Date of death: 1 June 2003 (aged 40)
- Height: 1.83 m (6 ft 0 in)
- Position: Striker

Youth career
- 1979–1981: Spartak Moscow

Senior career*
Years	Team	Apps	(Gls)
1981–1983	Spartak Moscow	8	(0)
1984	Spartak Ordzhonikidze	23	(13)
1984–1985	Dynamo Moscow	10	(3)
1986	Dynamo-2 Moscow	15	(1)
1987	Spartak Ordzhonikidze	10	(0)
1987–1988	Podillya Khmelnytskyi	48	(18)
1988	Spartak Moscow	0	(0)
1989–1990	Luch Vladivostok	35	(14)
1990	Podillya Khmelnytskyi	4	(0)
1991	Temp Shepetivka	40	(12)
1992	Podillya Khmelnytskyi	7	(1)
1992	Shakhtar Pavlohrad	8	(5)
1992	Krystal Chortkiv	4	(0)
- * Club domestic league appearances and goals

Sergei Nikolayevich Argudyayev (Russian: Серге́й Николаевич Аргудяев; 11 January 1963 – 1 June 2003) was a Russian professional footballer.

== Club career ==
He made his professional debut in the Soviet Top League in 1981 for FC Spartak Moscow. He played 4 games and scored 1 goal in the European Cup Winners' Cup 1984–85 for FC Dynamo Moscow.

== Honours ==
- Soviet Cup winner: 1984.
- Soviet Top League runner-up: 1981, 1983.
