= Yevgeni Korablyov =

Russian footballer

Personal information
- Full name: Yevgeni Konstantinovich Korablyov
- Date of birth: 29 October 1978 (age 48)
- Place of birth: Moscow, Russian SFSR, Soviet Union
- Height: 1.86 m (6 ft 1 in)
- Positions: Defender; midfielder

Youth career
- FC Spartak Moscow
- AFC Ajax
- FC Dynamo Moscow

Senior career*
Years	Team	Apps	(Gls)
1996–1998	FC Dynamo Moscow	16	(0)
1998–2000	FC Dynamo-2 Moscow	51	(1)
2001	FC Metallurg Krasnoyarsk	13	(0)
2003–2004	FC Oryol	29	(0)
2004–2009	FC Avangard Kursk	107	(2)
2010	FC Dynamo Kostroma	10	(0)

International career
1997	Russia U-19	1	(0)
1997–1999	Russia U-21	4	(1)
- * Club domestic league appearances and goals

Yevgeni Konstantinovich Korablyov (Russian: Евгений Константинович Кораблёв; born 29 October 1978) is a Russian former professional footballer.
