= Mikhail Zharinov =

Russian footballer (born 1975)

Personal information
- Full name: Mikhail Valeryevich Zharinov
- Date of birth: 25 January 1975 (age 51)
- Place of birth: Moscow, Russia
- Height: 1.88 m (6 ft 2 in)
- Positions: Defender; forward

Senior career*
Years	Team	Apps	(Gls)
1993–1994	FC Dynamo-2 Moscow	66	(11)
1995–1996	FC Dynamo-d Moscow	47	(6)
1996	FC Dynamo Stavropol	19	(0)
1997	FC Dynamo Moscow	9	(0)
1998	FC Anzhi Makhachkala	35	(2)
1999–2000	FC Uralan Elista	37	(1)
2001–2002	FC Dynamo Moscow	24	(0)
2003	FC Khimki	0	(0)
- * Club domestic league appearances and goals

Mikhail Valeryevich Zharinov (Russian: Михаил Валерьевич Жаринов; born 25 January 1975) is a former Russian professional footballer.

== Club career ==
He made his professional debut in the Russian Second Division in 1993 for FC Dynamo-2 Moscow.

== Honours ==
- Russian Premier League bronze: 1997.

== European club competitions ==
With FC Dynamo Moscow.

- UEFA Intertoto Cup 1997: 4 games.
- UEFA Cup 2001–02: 1 game.
