= Aleksandr Grebnev =

Russian footballer

Personal information
- Full name: Aleksandr Sergeyevich Grebnev
- Date of birth: 7 May 1947 (age 79)
- Place of birth: Moscow, Soviet Union
- Height: 1.78 m (5 ft 10 in)
- Position: Midfielder

Youth career
- 1965–1967: Spartak Moscow

Senior career*
Years	Team	Apps	(Gls)
1966–1969	Spartak Moscow	54	(1)
1970	Dinamo Minsk	32	(2)
1971	Dynamo Moscow	23	(0)
1972	Torpedo Moscow	4	(0)
1972–1974	Traktor Pavlodar	71	(13)
1975–1976	Dinamo Minsk	58	(2)
- * Club domestic league appearances and goals

Aleksandr Sergeyevich Grebnev (Russian: Александр Серге́евич Гребнев; born 7 May 1947) is a Russian former professional footballer. He made his professional debut in the Soviet Top League in 1966 for FC Spartak Moscow.

== Honours ==
- Soviet Top League champion: 1969.
- Soviet Top League runner-up: 1968.
- European Cup Winners' Cup 1971–72 finalist (2 games).
