= Rudolf Rehák =

Slovak footballer

Personal information
- Date of birth: 26 December 1965 (age 60)
- Place of birth: Bratislava
- Position: Defender

Senior career*
Years	Team	Apps	(Gls)
1984–1989	Inter Bratislava		
1989–1990	Dukla Banská Bystrica		
1990–1993	Inter Bratislava		
1994–1996	SK Hradec Králové		
1996–1997	VfB Admira Wacker Mödling		
1998–2000	ASK Kottingbrunn		
2000–2001	SV Schwechat		
2001	ASK Schwadorf		

Managerial career
- 2007–2008: Dukla Banská Bystrica
- * Club domestic league appearances and goals

Rudolf Rehák (born 26 December 1965) is a retired Slovak football defender.
