= Alain De Nil =

Belgian footballer

Personal information
- Date of birth: 17 August 1966 (age 60)
- Place of birth: Jette, Belgium

International career
Years	Team	Apps	(Gls)
1992	Belgium	1	(0)

Alain De Nil (born 17 August 1966) is a Belgian footballer. He played in one match for the Belgium national football team in 1992.

== Honours ==
=== Club ===
==== R White Daring Molenbeek ====
- Belgian Second Division: 1984–85

KV Mechelen

- Belgian Cup: 1986–87
- European Cup Winners Cup: 1987–88

=== Individual ===
- Man of the Season (Belgian First Division): 1991–92
- Belgian Fair Play Award: 1991-92
