= Yevgeni Dolgov =

Soviet and Russian footballer

Personal information
- Full name: Yevgeni Petrovich Dolgov
- Date of birth: 20 June 1969 (age 57)
- Place of birth: Lipetsk, Russian SFSR, Soviet Union
- Height: 1.78 m (5 ft 10 in)
- Position: Defender

Youth career
- Metallurg Lipetsk

Senior career*
Years	Team	Apps	(Gls)
1987	Metallurg Lipetsk	26	(0)
1988–1989	Iskra Smolensk	67	(2)
1990–1993	Dynamo Moscow	42	(0)
1994	Shenyang Liuyao		

International career
1990	USSR	1	(0)
- * Club domestic league appearances and goals

Yevgeni Petrovich Dolgov (Russian: Евгений Петрович Долгов; born 20 June 1969) is a former Soviet and Russian football player.

== Club career ==
He played for three seasons in the Soviet Top League and Russian Premier League with FC Dynamo Moscow.

== Honours ==
- Russian Premier League bronze: 1992, 1993.

== International career ==
Dolgov played his only game for the Soviet Union on August 29, 1990 in a friendly against Romania.
