= Peter Drozd =

Czech footballer (born 1973)

Personal information
- Date of birth: 12 November 1973 (age 52)
- Place of birth: Czechoslovakia
- Height: 1.84 m (6 ft 0 in)
- Position: Defender

Youth career
- VOKD Poruba
- FC Baník Ostrava

Senior career*
Years	Team	Apps	(Gls)
1991–1994	FC Baník Ostrava		
1994–1997	SK Hradec Králové	36	(2)
1997–2000	MŠK Žilina	99	(3)
2001–2005	FC Baník Ostrava	96	(7)
2005–2007	SK Kladno	14	(0)
2008–2009	FC Hlučín		

International career
1993	Czechoslovakia U21	3	(0)
- * Club domestic league appearances and goals

Peter Drozd (born 12 November 1973) is a former Czech football player who played for several Czech clubs, most notably FC Baník Ostrava.

Drozd was a member of the squad of Baník Ostrava in the 2003-2004 season, when Baník won the league title.
