= Alfred Azzopardi =

Maltese footballer

Personal information
- Date of birth: 5 February 1956 (age 70)
- Place of birth: Malta
- Position: Defender

Senior career*
Years	Team	Apps	(Gls)
1971–1986	Ħamrun Spartans	115	(5)
1986–1988	Hibernians	13	(2)

International career^{‡}
1984–1985	Malta	7	(0)
- * Club domestic league appearances and goals as of 26 March 2024 ‡ National team caps and goals as of 26 March 2024

Alfred Azzopardi (born 5 February 1956) is a retired footballer, who represented the Malta national team. During his career, he played as a defender for Ħamrun Spartans and Hibernians.

== International career ==
Azzopardi made his debut for Malta in a May 1984 World Cup qualification match away against Sweden and earned a total of 7 caps (no goals). His final international was an April 1985 World Cup qualification match against Czechoslovakia.

== Personal life ==
Azzopardi was severely injured in a car crash in summer 2025, in which his wife Mildred lost her life.

== Honours ==
- Maltese Premier League: 1

1983,

- FA Trophy: 2

1983, 1984
