= Mikhail Chesnokov =

Russian footballer

Personal information
- Full name: Mikhail Alekseyevich Chesnokov
- Date of birth: 11 February 1961 (age 65)
- Place of birth: Kaliningrad, Russian SFSR
- Height: 1.79 m (5 ft 10 1/2 in)
- Position: Forward

Senior career*
Years	Team	Apps	(Gls)
1977	FC Baltika Kaliningrad	19	(1)
1978–1979	FC Dynamo Vologda	39	(16)
1979–1981	FC Torpedo Moscow	3	(0)
1981–1983	FC Lokomotiv Moscow	90	(29)
1984	FC Dynamo Moscow	20	(1)
1985–1986	FC Dynamo Vologda	50	(29)
1987	FC Fakel Voronezh	30	(6)
1988–1989	FC Shinnik Yaroslavl	61	(20)
- * Club domestic league appearances and goals

Mikhail Alekseyevich Chesnokov (Russian: Михаил Алексеевич Чесноков; born 11 February 1961) is a Russian retired professional footballer.

== Club career ==
He made his professional debut in the Soviet Second League in 1977 for FC Baltika Kaliningrad. He played 2 games and scored 1 goal in the European Cup Winners' Cup 1984–85 for FC Dynamo Moscow.

== Honours ==
- Soviet Cup winner: 1984.
