= Zurab Semyonovich Tsereteli =

Georgian footballer

Zurab Tsereteli
Personal information
- Full name: Zurab Semyonovich Tsereteli
- Date of birth: 21 March 1953
- Place of birth: Chiatura, Georgian SSR
- Date of death: 14 January 1992 (aged 38)
- Place of death: Tbilisi, Georgia
- Height: 1.78 m (5 ft 10 in)
- Position: Striker

Senior career*
Years	Team	Apps	(Gls)
1971–1977	Dinamo Tbilisi	68	(8)
1978	Dynamo Moscow	10	(2)
1979	Torpedo Kutaisi	23	(4)
1979–1981	Pakhtakor Tashkent	45	(6)
- * Club domestic league appearances and goals

Zurab Semyonovich Tsereteli (Georgian: ზურაბ წერეთელი; March 21, 1953 – 14 January 1992) was a Georgian professional footballer.

== Club career ==
He made his professional debut in the Soviet Top League in 1973 for FC Dinamo Tbilisi. He played two games and scored one goal in the 1977–78 European Cup Winners' Cup semifinals for FC Dynamo Moscow.

== Honours ==
- Soviet Top League bronze: 1976 (spring), 1976 (autumn).
