= Jean-François Daniel =

French footballer (born 1964)

Personal information
- Date of birth: 14 June 1964 (age 62)
- Place of birth: Sospel, France
- Height: 1.65 m (5 ft 5 in)
- Position: Midfielder

Senior career*
Years	Team	Apps	(Gls)
1982–1987	AS Saint-Étienne	71	(4)
1987–1988	Lille OSC	21	(0)
1988–1992	AS Cannes	113	(3)
1992–1995	Bordeaux	66	(1)
1995–1996	OGC Nice	11	(0)

International career
1986	France U-21	1	(0)
- * Club domestic league appearances and goals

Jean-François Daniel (born 14 June 1964) is a retired French footballer who played as a midfielder.

== Honours ==
- 1985–86 French Division 2 (Group A)
