= Torsten Wohlert =

German footballer

Torsten Wirth
Personal information
- Date of birth: 10 December 1965 (age 60)
- Place of birth: Travemünde, West Germany
- Height: 1.80 m (5 ft 11 in)
- Position: Defender

Youth career
- TSV Kücknitz

Senior career*
Years	Team	Apps	(Gls)
–1987	VfB Lübeck		
1987–1988	Borussia Dortmund	2	(0)
1988–1991	FC Homburg	79	(5)
1991–1993	Waldhof Mannheim	75	(5)
1993–2002	MSV Duisburg	229	(14)
2002–2004	SV Straelen		
- * Club domestic league appearances and goals

Torsten Wohlert (born 10 December 1965 in Travemünde) is a German former professional footballer who played as a defender.

== Honours ==
MSV Duisburg

- DFB-Pokal finalist: 1998
