= János Koszta =

Hungarian footballer

Personal information
- Full name: János Koszta
- Date of birth: 18 March 1959 (age 67)
- Place of birth: Sajószentpéter, Hungary
- Height: 1.95 m (6 ft 5 in)
- Position: Goalkeeper

Senior career*
Years	Team	Apps	(Gls)
1984–1989	FC Fehérvár	37	(0)
1989–1995	Vác-Újbuda LTC	154	(0)
1995	FC Hatvan	?	(?)
1995–1999	BVSC Budapest	90	(0)

International career
1991–1994	Hungary	3	(0)
- * Club domestic league appearances and goals

János Koszta (born 18 March 1959 in Sajószentpéter) is a Hungarian football player who currently plays for BVSC Budapest.
