= Rainer Sachse =

German footballer

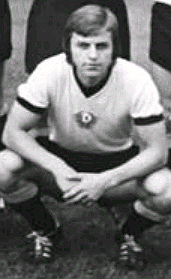
- Rainer Sachse in 1976

Personal information
- Date of birth: 15 June 1950 (age 76)
- Place of birth: Dresden, East Germany
- Position: Striker

Youth career
- 1963–1967: Einheit Dresden

Senior career*
Years	Team	Apps	(Gls)
1967–1970	Einheit Dresden		
1970–1980	Dynamo Dresden	172	(70)
1980–1984	Stahl Riesa		

International career
1977	East Germany	2	(0)

Managerial career
- 1986–1989: Stahl Freital
- 1989–1997: Meissner SV
- * Club domestic league appearances and goals

Rainer Sachse (born 15 June 1950) is a German former footballer.

Sachse scored 83 goals in 208 East German top flight matches.

The forward won 2 caps for East Germany in 1977.
