= Óscar Duarte (footballer, born 1950) =

Portuguese footballer

Óscar
Personal information
- Full name: Óscar Vicente Martins Duarte
- Date of birth: 5 December 1950 (age 75)
- Place of birth: Praia, Cape Verde
- Position: Midfielder

Senior career*
Years	Team	Apps	(Gls)
1969–1970	Santa Maria (Lsb)		
1975–1976	Sporting Covilhã	30	(2)
1976–1978	Estoril-Praia	59	(6)
1978–1979	FC Porto	14	(1)
1979–1980	Boavista	7	(0)
1980–1981	Académico	17	(1)
1981–1984	Farense		

International career
1978	Portugal	1	(0)
- * Club domestic league appearances and goals

Óscar Vicente Martins Duarte (born 5 December 1950 in Praia), known simply as Óscar, is a Portuguese former footballer who played as midfielder.

He earned his only cap for the Portugal national football team on 8 March 1978, playing the last 12 minutes of a 2–0 friendly defeat to France at the Parc des Princes in place of fellow debutant José Alberto Costa.
