= Alexey Sereda =

Russian footballer and coach

Aleksei Sereda
Personal information
- Full name: Aleksei Leonidovich Sereda
- Date of birth: 12 February 1966 (age 60)
- Place of birth: Taganrog, Russian SFSR
- Height: 1.76 m (5 ft 9 in)
- Position: Midfielder

Senior career*
| Years | Team | Apps | (Gls) |
| 1982–1985 | FC Torpedo Taganrog | 48 | (6) |
| 1986–1989 | FC SKA Rostov-on-Don | 117 | (3) |
| 1990–1991 | FC Dynamo Moscow | 48 | (0) |
| 1992–1993 | FC Rostselmash Rostov-on-Don | 28 | (5) |
| 1993–1994 | FC Lada Togliatti | 35 | (8) |
| 1994 | FC Torpedo Taganrog | 9 | (0) |
| 1995–1996 | FC Uralan Elista | 38 | (7) |
| 1996 | FC Volgodonsk | 16 | (1) |
| 1999 | FC Torpedo Taganrog | 12 | (1) |
| 2000 | FC Krasnoznamensk | 32 | (2) |
| 2001 | FC Volga Ulyanovsk | 23 | (2) |
| 2002 | FC Spartak-Kavkaztransgaz Izobilny | 17 | (3) |

Managerial career
- 2007–2008: FC Taganrog (director)
- 2009: FC Taganrog
- 2009–2010: FC Taganrog (coach)
- 2010: FC Taganrog (caretaker)
- * Club domestic league appearances and goals

Aleksei Leonidovich Sereda (Russian: Алексей Леонидович Середа; born 12 February 1966) is a Russian professional football coach and a former player. As a player, he made his debut in the Soviet Second League in 1982 for FC Torpedo Taganrog. He played 2 games in the UEFA Cup 1991–92 for FC Dynamo Moscow.

== Honours ==
- Soviet Top League bronze: 1990.
