= Jacek Dąbrowski =

Polish footballer

Personal information
- Full name: Jacek Dąbrowski
- Date of birth: 22 February 1974 (age 52)
- Place of birth: Otwock, Poland
- Height: 1.75 m (5 ft 9 in)
- Position: Forward

Senior career*
Years	Team	Apps	(Gls)
1992–1993	Mazur Karczew		
1993–1995	Motor Lublin		
1995	Lechia Gdańsk	12	(1)
1996–2000	Polonia Warsaw	111	(11)
2000–2001	Orlen Płock	29	(1)
2001	Polonia Warsaw	11	(0)
2002	KSZO	12	(3)
2002	Polonia Warsaw	11	(0)
2003–2005	Kallithea	57	(0)
2005–2006	Kerkyra	23	(1)
2006–2007	ŁKS Łomża	29	(3)
2007	ŁKS Łódź	10	(0)
2008–2012	Mazur Karczew		
2012	Radość Warsaw		
2019	Promnik Łaskarzew	6	(0)
- * Club domestic league appearances and goals

Jacek Dąbrowski (born 22 February 1974 in Otwock) is a Polish former professional footballer who played as a forward.

He previously played for Lechia Gdańsk, Polonia Warsaw and ŁKS Łódź in the Polish Ekstraklasa.

== Honours ==
Polonia Warsaw

- Ekstraklasa: 1999–2000
- Polish League Cup: 1999–2000
