= Alex Azzopardi =

Maltese footballer

Personal information
- Date of birth: 24 March 1961 (age 65)
- Place of birth: Malta
- Position: Defender

Senior career*
Years	Team	Apps	(Gls)
1978–1992	Ħamrun Spartans	187	(3)

International career^{‡}
1982–1991	Malta	46	(0)
- * Club domestic league appearances and goals as of 26 March 2024 ‡ National team caps and goals as of 26 March 2024

Alex Azzopardi (born 24 March 1961) is a retired footballer, who represented the Malta national team. During his career, he played as a defender for Ħamrun Spartans. He was voted Malta Footballer of the Month four times.

== International career ==
Azzopardi made his debut for Malta in a December 1982 friendly match against Bulgaria and earned a total of 46 caps (including 2 unofficial), scoring no goals. His final international was a March 1991 European Championship qualification match away against the Netherlands.

== Honours ==
- Maltese Premier League: 4

1983, 1987, 1988, 1991

- FA Trophy: 6

1983, 1984, 1987, 1988, 1989, 1992
