= Vladimir Basalayev =

Soviet Russian footballer (1945–2019)

Personal information
- Full name: Vladimir Sergeyevich Basalayev
- Date of birth: 12 August 1945
- Place of birth: Kursk, USSR
- Date of death: 28 March 2019 (aged 73)
- Place of death: Moscow, Russia
- Height: 1.79 m (5 ft 10 in)
- Position: Defender

Youth career
- Lokomotiv Kursk

Senior career*
Years	Team	Apps	(Gls)
1964–1965	Trudovye Rezervy Kursk		
1965–1970	FC Lokomotiv Moscow	137	(4)
1971–1975	FC Dynamo Moscow	107	(2)

International career
1968	USSR	2	(0)

Managerial career
- 2001–2012: FC Dynamo Moscow (director)
- * Club domestic league appearances and goals

Vladimir Sergeyevich Basalayev (Russian: Владимир Серге́евич Басалаев; 12 August 1945 – 28 March 2019) was a Soviet Russian football player.

== International career ==
Basalayev made his debut for USSR on 16 June 1968 in a friendly against Austria.
