= Valeri Zykov =

Soviet footballer

Personal information
- Full name: Valeri Borisovich Zykov
- Date of birth: 24 February 1944 (age 82)
- Place of birth: Gorky, USSR
- Height: 1.78 m (5 ft 10 in)
- Position: Defender

Youth career
- Lokomotiv Gorky
- Trudovye Rezervy Gorky

Senior career*
Years	Team	Apps	(Gls)
1963–1965	Volga Gorky		
1966–1975	FC Dynamo Moscow	213	(1)

International career
1970–1971	USSR	4	(0)
- * Club domestic league appearances and goals

Valeri Borisovich Zykov (Russian: Валерий Борисович Зыков; born 24 February 1944) is a former Soviet football player. Since 1991 he works for the FC Dynamo Moscow retired former players organization.

== Career ==
Born in Gorky, Zykov began playing youth football with Lokomotiv Gorky. He played as a defender for Volga Gorky and FC Dynamo Moscow, appearing in 213 Soviet league matches. Zykov won the Soviet Cup twice with Dynamo and was awarded Master of Sports of the USSR, International Class.

== Honours ==
- Soviet Cup winner: 1967, 1970.

== International career ==
Zykov made his debut for USSR on 6 May 1970 in a friendly against Bulgaria. He also played in UEFA Euro 1972 qualifiers (he did not play in the final tournament).
