= Eddy Snelders =

Belgian footballer (born 1959)

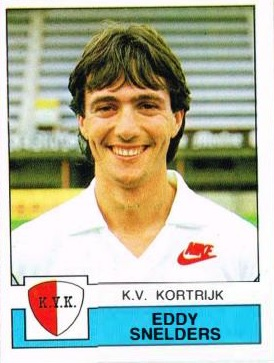

Personal information
- Full name: Eduard Roza Lodewijk Snelders
- Date of birth: 9 April 1959 (age 67)
- Place of birth: Kapellen, Belgium
- Height: 1.83 m (6 ft 0 in)
- Position: Defender

Senior career*
| Years | Team | Apps | (Gls) |
| 1975–1980 | Royal Antwerp | 95 | (8) |
| 1980–1982 | Lokeren | 53 | (6) |
| 1982–1984 | Lierse S.K. | 64 | (17) |
| 1984–1986 | Standard Liège | 55 | (15) |
| 1986–1989 | K.V. Kortrijk | 95 | (32) |
| 1989–1993 | Germinal Ekeren | 127 | (12) |
| 1993–1996 | Lierse S.K. | 94 | (6) |
| 1996–1997 | Germinal Ekeren | 10 | (0) |

International career
| 1981 | Belgium | 1 | (0) |
- * Club domestic league appearances and goals

Eddy Snelders (born 9 April 1959) is a Belgian retired footballer who played as a defender. As of 2024, Snelders is facing legal prosecution for voyeurism, exhibitionism, child pornography and sexual assault.
