= Aleksandr Golovnya =

Soviet footballer

Personal information
- Full name: Aleksandr Vitalyevich Golovnya
- Date of birth: October 20, 1959 (age 67)
- Place of birth: Mozyr, Gomel Oblast, Byelorussian SSR
- Height: 1.80 m (5 ft 11 in)
- Position: Defender

Youth career
- Dinamo Minsk

Senior career*
Years	Team	Apps	(Gls)
1976–1978	Gomselmash Gomel	48	(0)
1978–1981	Dinamo Minsk	62	(0)
1982–1986	Dynamo Moscow	113	(5)
1987–1989	Lokomotiv Moscow	70	(0)
1990	Orlando Lions		
1990–1993	San Diego Sockers (Indoor)		
- * Club domestic league appearances and goals

Aleksandr Vitalyevich Golovnya (Russian: Александр Витальевич Головня, Belarusian: Аляксандр Віталевіч Головня; born 20 October 1959) is a Soviet former professional footballer.

== Club career ==
He made his professional debut in the Soviet Second League in 1976 for Mashinostroitel Gomel.

== Honours ==
- Soviet Top League runner-up: 1986.
- Soviet Cup winner: 1984.
- Soviet Cup runner-up: 1990 (played in the early stages of the 1989/90 tournament for FC Lokomotiv Moscow).

== European club competitions ==
With FC Dynamo Moscow.

- UEFA Cup 1982–83: 2 games.
- European Cup Winners' Cup 1984–85: 7 games.
