= Nikolai Gontar =

Russian footballer and coach

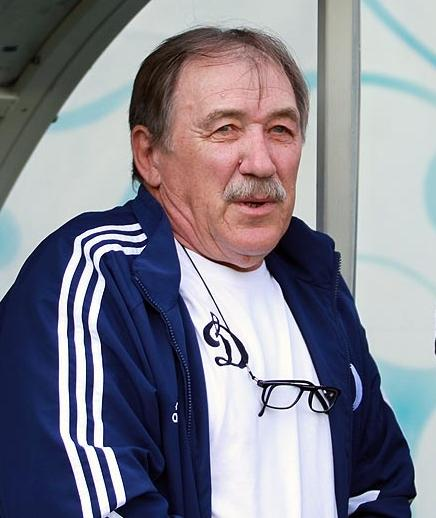

Personal information
- Full name: Nikolai Pavlovich Gontar
- Date of birth: 29 April 1949 (age 77)
- Place of birth: Vladivostok, Russian SFSR
- Height: 1.87 m (6 ft 2 in)
- Position: Goalkeeper

Youth career
- Luch Vladivostok

Senior career*
Years	Team	Apps	(Gls)
1967–1971	Luch Vladivostok		
1972–1984	FC Dynamo Moscow	177	(0)

International career
1976–1979	Soviet Union	12	(0)

Managerial career
- 1986–1987: FC Dynamo Moscow (director)
- 1988–2012: FC Dynamo Moscow (goalkeeping coach)
- 2015–2016: FC Dynamo Moscow (assistant)
- 2016–2017: FC Dynamo Moscow (goalkeeping coach)
- * Club domestic league appearances and goals

Nikolai Pavlovich Gontar (Russian: Николай Павлович Гонтарь; born 29 April 1949) is a Russian football coach and former player.

== Honours ==
- Soviet Top League winner: 1976 (spring)
- Soviet Top League bronze: 1975
- Top 33 players year-end list: 1976

== International career ==
Gontar made his debut for the USSR on 28 November 1976 in a friendly against Argentina. He played in the UEFA Euro 1980 qualifiers (the USSR did not qualify for the final tournament).
