= Stanislav Vahala =

Czech footballer

Personal information
- Date of birth: 26 November 1960 (age 65)
- Place of birth: Nový Jičín, Czechoslovakia
- Position: Goalkeeper

Senior career*
Years	Team	Apps	(Gls)
–1982	TJ Baník Ostrava		
1982–1984	RH Cheb		
1984–1986	TJ Baník Ostrava		
1986–1991	DAC Dunajská Streda		
1991–1994	SK Slavia Prague		
1994–1998	SK Hradec Králové		

International career
- Czechoslovakia u-21
- * Club domestic league appearances and goals

Stanislav Vahala (born 26 November 1960) is a retired Czech football goalkeeper.
