= Stian Berget =

Norwegian footballer (born 1977)

Personal information
- Date of birth: 2 June 1977 (age 49)
- Place of birth: Rena, Norway
- Height: 1.76 m (5 ft 9 in)
- Position: Midfielder

Youth career
- Rena

Senior career*
Years	Team	Apps	(Gls)
1996–1999	Ham-Kam	59	(5)
1999–2004	Lillestrøm	81	(7)
2005–2007	Nybergsund	46	(13)
2008–2009	Flisa		
2010	Elverum		

International career
	Norway u-21	3	(0)
- * Club domestic league appearances and goals

Stian Berget (born 2 June 1977) is a retired Norwegian footballer.

He hails from Rena and played for Ham-Kam from 1996 to 1999, then Lillestrøm SK before joining Nybergsund IL ahead of the 2005 season. He signed for Flisa IL ahead of the 2008 season, and then Elverum after the 2009 season.

He has also played for the Norwegian under-21 national team.

He started teaching PE at Elverum Videregående Skole in 2013.
