= Valeri Balyasnikov =

Russian footballer

Personal information
- Full name: Valeri Fyodorovich Balyasnikov
- Date of birth: 16 November 1943
- Place of birth: Moscow, Russian SFSR
- Date of death: 17 November 1999 (aged 56)
- Place of death: Moscow, Russia
- Height: 1.88 m (6 ft 2 in)
- Position: Goalkeeper

Youth career
- Dynamo Moscow

Senior career*
| Years | Team | Apps | (Gls) |
| 1961–1965 | Dynamo Moscow | 2 | (0) |
| 1965 | Karpaty Lviv | 3 | (0) |
| 1966 | Torpedo Moscow | 0 | (0) |
| 1965–1967 | Spartak Kostroma | 2 | (0) |
| 1968–1971 | Dynamo Moscow | 28 | (0) |
| 1972 | Krylia Sovetov Kuybyshev | 8 | (0) |
| 1973 | Dynamo Bryansk | 22 | (0) |
- * Club domestic league appearances and goals

Valeri Fyodorovich Balyasnikov (Russian: Валерий Фёдорович Балясников; born 16 November 1943; died 17 November 1999) was a Russian professional footballer.

== Club career ==
He made his professional debut in the Soviet Top League in 1963 for FC Dynamo Moscow.

== Honours ==
- Soviet Top League champion: 1963.
- Soviet Cup winner: 1970.
- European Cup Winners' Cup 1971–72 finalist (1 game).
