= Igor Bulanov =

Russian footballer

Personal information
- Full name: Igor Vasilyevich Bulanov
- Date of birth: 15 November 1963 (age 62)
- Place of birth: Kaliningrad, Russian SFSR
- Height: 1.87 m (6 ft 1 1/2 in)
- Position: Defender

Senior career*
Years	Team	Apps	(Gls)
1980–1981	Baltika Kaliningrad	32	(2)
1981	Dinamo Minsk	0	(0)
1982–1989	Dynamo Moscow	144	(15)
1989	Lokomotiv Moscow	13	(2)
1989–1996	VfL Osnabrück	103	(2)
1996–2003	SV Bad Rothenfelde		
- * Club domestic league appearances and goals

Igor Vasilyevich Bulanov (Russian: Игорь Васильевич Буланов; born 15 November 1963) is a former Russian professional footballer.

== Playing career ==
He made his professional debut in the Soviet Second League in 1980 for FC Baltika Kaliningrad.

== Honours ==
- Soviet Top League runner-up: 1986
- Soviet Cup winner: 1984
- Soviet Cup finalist: 1990

== European club competitions ==
FC Dynamo Moscow

- European Cup Winners' Cup 1984–85: 6 games, 2 goals
- UEFA Cup 1987–88: 4 games
