= Peter Werni =

Norwegian footballer (born 1974)

Peter Werni (born 3 June 1974) is a Norwegian retired football defender who now works at the players' association NISO, where he is an advocate for eradicating racism in football.

His career started in Skjetten SK, before he played for Lillestrøm SK between 1995 and 2005. At this point he was not offered a new contract, and played for Aalesunds FK until joining Skjetten ahead of the 2008 season.

He has also played for the Norwegian under-21 national team.

Former coach Ivar Hoff said about Werni: "Exciting play this Werni. Harder reception than shots".
