= Daniel Kaplan (footballer) =

Czech footballer

Personal information
- Date of birth: 6 March 1973 (age 53)
- Position: Midfielder

Senior career*
Years	Team	Apps	(Gls)
1993–1994	SK Slavia Prague		
1994–2000	SK Hradec Králové		
- * Club domestic league appearances and goals

Daniel Kaplan (born 6 March 1973) is a retired Czech football midfielder.
