= Yevgeni Zhukov =

Russian footballer

Personal information
- Full name: Yevgeni Panteleimonovich Zhukov
- Date of birth: 7 December 1950
- Place of birth: Moscow, Russian SFSR
- Date of death: 21 November 1990 (aged 39)
- Place of death: Moscow, Russian SFSR
- Height: 1.76 m (5 ft 9 1/2 in)
- Positions: Defender; midfielder

Youth career
- FC Dynamo Moscow

Senior career*
Years	Team	Apps	(Gls)
1969–1974	FC Dynamo Moscow	108	(9)
1975–1976	FC Pakhtakor Tashkent	62	(3)
- * Club domestic league appearances and goals

Yevgeni Panteleimonovich Zhukov (Russian: Евгений Пантелеймонович Жуков; 7 December 1950 – 21 November 1990) was a Russian professional footballer.

== Club career ==
He made his professional debut in the Soviet Top League in 1969 for FC Dynamo Moscow.

== Honours ==
- Soviet Top League runner-up: 1970.
- European Cup Winners' Cup 1971–72 finalist (9 games).
- Soviet Cup winner: 1970.
