= Werner Lihsa =

German footballer

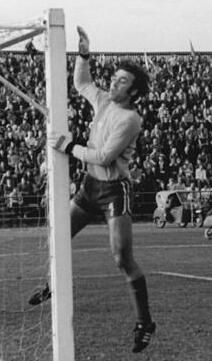
- Lihsa with BFC Dynamo in 1974

Personal information
- Date of birth: 3 June 1943 (age 83)
- Place of birth: Schweidnitz, Lower Silesia, Germany
- Height: 1.83 m (6 ft 0 in)
- Position: Goalkeeper

Youth career
- 1958–: BSG Traktor Höhnstedt
- SC Chemie Halle

Senior career*
Years	Team	Apps	(Gls)
–1966	SG Dynamo Eisleben		
1966–1975	BFC Dynamo		
1968–1975	BFC Dynamo II		

International career
1972	East Germany	1	(0)
- * Club domestic league appearances and goals

Werner Lihsa (born 3 June 1943) is a former East Germany international goalkeeper, who played for SG Dynamo Eisleben and BFC Dynamo, as well as the East Germany national football team.

== Club career ==
Lihsa began playing football for the youth teams of BSG Traktor Höhnstedt in 1953. He then switched to sports club SC Chemie Halle, before he finally joined SG Dynamo Eisleben (de). Lihsa was then transferred to football club BFC Dynamo in 1966.

Lihsa made his debut for the first team of BFC Dynamo against ASG Vorwärts Meiningen in the round of 16 of the 1966–67 FDGB-Pokal on 3 December 1966. He then made his debut for BFC Dynamo in the DDR-Oberliga away against BSG Chemie Leipzig in the first matchday of the 1968-69 DDR-Oberliga on 17 August 1968. Lihsa was mostly used in the reserve team BFC Dynamo II during his first seasons at the club. He finally rose to become the first-choice goalkeeper of BFC Dynamo in the 1970–71 season with 24 league appearances. Lihsa was voted the 1971 and 1972 BFC Footballer of the Year at the sixth and seventh edition of the club's traditional annual ball in the Dynamo-Sporthalle at the beginning of the new year. Lihsa retired from his playing career after the 1974–75 season. He played a total of 148 competitive matches for BFC Dynamo during his career.

== International career ==
Lihsa won his single international cap in a friendly against Czechoslovakia in late 1972.

== Career after pro times ==
Lihsa was a trained locksmith. He attended the Technical school of the East German Ministry of the Interior during his time at BFC Dynamo. After retiring from his playing career he worked as a groundskeeper at the Sportforum Hohenschönhausen among other things.
