= Janusz Sybis =

Polish footballer

Personal information
- Full name: Janusz Witold Sybis
- Date of birth: 10 October 1952 (age 74)
- Place of birth: Częstochowa, Poland
- Height: 1.64 m (5 ft 5 in)
- Position: Striker

Senior career*
Years	Team	Apps	(Gls)
1969–1983	Śląsk Wrocław		
1983–1986	Pittsburgh Spirit (indoor)		
- Ślęża Sobótka

International career
1976–1980	Poland	18	(2)
- * Club domestic league appearances and goals

Janusz Witold Sybis (born 10 October 1952) is a Polish former footballer who played as a striker.

== Honours ==
Śląsk Wrocław

- Ekstraklasa: 1976–77
- Polish Cup: 1975–76

Individual

- II liga top scorer: 1972–73
