= Sergey Artyomov =

Russian footballer

Personal information
- Full name: Sergey Nikolayevich Artyomov
- Date of birth: 1 January 1978 (age 48)
- Place of birth: Moscow, Russian SFSR
- Height: 1.77 m (5 ft 9 1/2 in)
- Position: Forward

Senior career*
Years	Team	Apps	(Gls)
1994–1995	FC Chertanovo Moscow	25	(6)
1996–2000	FC Dynamo Moscow	13	(0)
2001–2007	FC Lobnya-Alla Lobnya	117	(32^{1})
2008–2009	FC Zvezda Serpukhov	32	(5)
- * Club domestic league appearances and goals as of (Note: Lobnya amateur seasons not counted)

Sergey Nikolayevich Artyomov (Russian: Серге́й Николаевич Артёмов; born 1 January 1978) is a retired Russian professional footballer. He made his debut in the Russian Premier League in 1996 for FC Dynamo Moscow.

== Honours ==
- Russian Premier League bronze: 1997.
- Russian Third League Zone 3 top scorer: 1996.

== European competitions ==
- UEFA Cup 1996–97 with FC Dynamo Moscow: 2 games, 2 goals.
- UEFA Intertoto Cup 1997 with FC Dynamo Moscow: 1 game.
