= Daniel Mašek =

Czech footballer

Personal information
- Date of birth: 8 June 1969 (age 57)
- Position: Midfielder

Senior career*
Years	Team	Apps	(Gls)
1993–1994	FK Viktoria Žižkov		
1994–1995	SK Hradec Králové		
1995–1997	FK Viktoria Žižkov		
- * Club domestic league appearances and goals

Daniel Mašek (born 8 June 1969) is a retired Czech football midfielder.
