= Aleksandr Makhovikov =

Soviet footballer

Personal information
- Full name: Aleksandr Fyodorovich Makhovikov
- Date of birth: 12 April 1951 (age 75)
- Place of birth: Moscow, USSR
- Height: 1.74 m (5 ft 9 in)
- Positions: Defender; midfielder

Youth career
- Yunye Pionery Moscow
- FC Dynamo Moscow

Senior career*
Years	Team	Apps	(Gls)
1971–1983	FC Dynamo Moscow	287	(20)
1985–1988	FC Kuban Krasnodar	46	(2)

International career
1972–1979	USSR	25	(1)
- * Club domestic league appearances and goals

Aleksandr Fyodorovich Makhovikov (Russian: Александр Фёдорович Маховиков; born 12 April 1951) is a former Soviet football player.

== Honours ==
- Soviet Top League winner: 1976 (spring).
- Soviet Cup winner: 1977, 1984.

== International career ==
Makhovikov made his debut for USSR on 30 April 1972, in the UEFA Euro 1972 quarterfinal against Yugoslavia. He did not play again for the national team until 1976. He played in the qualifiers for UEFA Euro 1980 (USSR did not qualify for the final tournament) and scored his only national team goal in his last USSR game, a friendly against West Germany.
