= Carlo Seychell =

Maltese footballer

Personal information
- Full name: Carlo Seychell
- Date of birth: 12 March 1949 (age 77)
- Place of birth: Pietà, Malta
- Position: Striker

Youth career
- Valletta Vanguards

Senior career*
Years	Team	Apps	(Gls)
1967–1982	Valletta	177	(50)
1982–1983	Ħamrun Spartans	12	(2)
Total		189	(52)

International career
1972-1979	Malta	20	(0)
- * Club domestic league appearances and goals

Carlo Seychell (born 12 March 1949) is a Maltese retired footballer.

== Club career ==
Born in Pietà, Seychell played the majority of his career for Valletta as a defender.

== International career ==
Seychell made his debut for Malta in an October 1972 World Cup qualification match away against Sweden and earned a total of 20 caps, scoring no goals. His final international was a February 1979 European Championship qualification match against West Germany.

== Honours ==
Valletta

- Maltese Premier League: 1974, 1978, 1980
- Maltese FA Trophy: 1975, 1977, 1978

Ħamrun Spartans

- Maltese Premier League: 1983
