= Pierre Larsen =

Danish footballer (born 1959)

Personal information
- Full name: Pierre Larsen
- Date of birth: 22 January 1959 (age 67)
- Place of birth: Copenhagen, Denmark
- Position: Midfielder

Senior career*
Years	Team	Apps	(Gls)
1981–1986	B1903	75	(4)
1984–1985	→Hvidovre (on loan)	60	(2)
1986–1988	Grasshopper Zurich	41	(2)
1988–1992	B1903	145	(3)
1992–1993	FC Copenhagen	27	
Total		358	(11)

International career
1985–1988	Denmark	17	(3)
- * Club domestic league appearances and goals

Pierre Larsen (born 22 January 1959) is a former footballer who played as a midfielder.
