= Yuri Mentyukov =

Russian footballer and coach

Personal information
- Full name: Yuri Aleksandrovich Mentyukov
- Date of birth: 7 February 1962 (age 64)
- Place of birth: Moscow, Soviet Union
- Height: 1.82 m (5 ft 11 1/2 in)
- Position: Midfielder

Senior career*
Years	Team	Apps	(Gls)
1978–1985	FC Dynamo Moscow	93	(3)
1986	FC Shinnik Yaroslavl	31	(2)
1989	FC Arsenal Tula	29	(2)
1989–1990	FC Spartak Andijan	24	(1)
1990	FC Torgmash Lyubertsy	14	(0)
1991	FC Prometey Lyubertsy	36	(2)
1992–1993	FC Vympel Rybinsk	44	(5)
1997	FC Krasnogvardeyets Moscow	1	(0)

Managerial career
- 2007: FC Dynamo Moscow (reserves)
- * Club domestic league appearances and goals

Yuri Aleksandrovich Mentyukov (Russian: Юрий Александрович Ментюков; born 7 February 1962) is a Russian professional football coach and a former player.

== Club career ==
He made his professional debut in the Soviet Top League in 1980 for FC Dynamo Moscow.

== Honours ==
- Soviet Cup winner: 1984.

== European club competitions ==
With FC Dynamo Moscow.

- UEFA Cup 1982–83: 2 games, 1 goal.
- European Cup Winners' Cup 1984–85: 1 game.
