= János Romanek =

Hungarian footballer

Personal information
- Date of birth: 28 March 1966 (age 60)
- Place of birth: Kunhegyes, Hungary
- Position: Midfielder

Senior career*
Years	Team	Apps	(Gls)
1986–1988	Honvéd Budapest		
1989	Dunaújváros		
1989–1996	Vác		
1996–1998	MFC Pécs		
1998–1999	Vác		
2000	DAC Dunajská Streda		
2000–2005	MÁV Szolnok		
- * Club domestic league appearances and goals

János Romanek (born 28 March 1966) is a retired Hungarian football midfielder.
