= Tomáš Urban (footballer) =

Czech footballer

Personal information
- Date of birth: 12 May 1968 (age 58)
- Position: Defender

Senior career*
Years	Team	Apps	(Gls)
1989–1991	SK Slavia Prague		
1991–1992	Dukla Prague		
1993–1994	Bohemians 1905		
1994	→ AC Sparta Prague		
1994	→ FK Jablonec		
1994–1995	SK Hradec Králové		
1996–1999	FK Viktoria Žižkov		
1999–2000	DAC Dunajská Streda		
- * Club domestic league appearances and goals

Tomáš Urban (born 12 May 1968) is a retired Czech football defender.
