= List of FC Dynamo Moscow players =

This is a list of notable players for FC Dynamo Moscow. It includes the players who made at least 50 league appearances for the club or scored at least 5 league goals.

Figures and dates are for the league competitions only (Soviet Top League, Russian Premier League and Russian First League). Appearances and goals in the games which were awarded to one team after the fact (or in the unfinished 1941 Soviet Top League) are included.

For a list of all Dynamo players with a Wikipedia article, see Category:FC Dynamo Moscow players.

== Players ==
As of 24 May 2025

| Name | Nationality | Position | Dynamo career | Appearances | Goals |
|---|---|---|---|---|---|
| Guram Adzhoyev | Soviet Union | MF | 1981–83 | 73 | 6 |
| Viktor Anichkin | Soviet Union | MF | 1960–72 | 282 | 9 |
| Yevgeni Arkhangelskiy | Soviet Union | FW | 1947–48 | 37 | 13 |
| Renat Ataulin | Soviet Union | MF | 1984–85 | 52 | 1 |
| Yuri Avrutskiy | Soviet Union | FW | 1962–71 | 174 | 46 |
| Anatoly Baidachny | Soviet Union | FW | 1969–74 | 64 | 17 |
| Fabián Balbuena | Paraguay | DF | 2021–22, 2023–25 | 71 | 7 |
| Vladimir Basalayev | Soviet Union | DF | 1971–75 | 107 | 2 |
| Radoslav Batak | Montenegro | DF | 2003–05 | 62 | 3 |
| Yevgeni Baykov | Soviet Union | DF | 1951–58 | 88 | 7 |
| Fatos Bećiraj | Montenegro | FW | 2016–17 | 60 | 13 |
| Vladimir Belyayev | Soviet Union | GK | 1953–64 | 84 | 0 |
| Roman Berezovsky | Armenia | GK | 2002–05, 2012–15 | 109 | 0 |
| Konstantin Beskov | Soviet Union | FW | 1941–54 | 196 | 93 |
| Bitello | Brazil | MF | 2023–present | 49 | 11 |
| Vsevolod Blinkov | Soviet Union | MF | 1940–53 | 211 | 13 |
| Nikolai Bobkov | Soviet Union | FW | 1962–68 | 127 | 11 |
| Gennadi Bondarenko | Soviet Union | FW | 1954 | 21 | 8 |
| Aleksandr Borodyuk | Soviet Union | FW | 1982–89 | 187 | 53 |
| Aleksandr Bubnov | Soviet Union | DF | 1974–82 | 206 | 7 |
| Igor Bulanov | Soviet Union | DF | 1982–89 | 144 | 15 |
| Dmitri Bulykin | Russia | FW | 2001–07 | 119 | 26 |
| Pyotr Bystrov | Russia | MF | 2000–01 | 36 | 6 |
| Jorge Carrascal | Colombia | MF | 2023–present | 49 | 7 |
| Deividas Česnauskis | Lithuania | MF | 2000–03 | 69 | 5 |
| Luis Chávez | Mexico | MF | 2023–present | 42 | 7 |
| Arkady Chernyshev | Soviet Union | MF | 1936–44 | 84 | 1 |
| Andrei Chernyshov | Russia | DF | 1987–91, 1993–94 | 111 | 4 |
| Dmitri Cheryshev | Russia | FW | 1993–96 | 104 | 37 |
| Igor Chislenko | Soviet Union | FW | 1957, 1959–70 | 229 | 68 |
| Alexandr Covalenco | Moldova | DF | 2002–05 | 61 | 0 |
| Danny | Portugal | MF | 2005–08 | 97 | 16 |
| Eli Dasa | Israel | DF | 2022–present | 62 | 0 |
| Nikolay Dementyev | Soviet Union | FW | 1940–45 | 33 | 20 |
| Igor Denisov | Russia | MF | 2013–16 | 61 | 1 |
| Sergei Derkach | Russia | MF | 1989–94 | 96 | 10 |
| Derlei | Brazil | FW | 2005–06 | 41 | 20 |
| Igor Dobrovolski | Russia | MF | 1985–90, 1993–94 | 155 | 36 |
| Vladimir Dolbonosov | Soviet Union | DF | 1967–75 | 151 | 2 |
| Oleg Dolmatov | Soviet Union | DF | 1972–79 | 154 | 8 |
| Andrei Dyatel | Russia | MF | 1998, 2001–05 | 72 | 10 |
| Balázs Dzsudzsák | Hungary | MF | 2012–15 | 89 | 13 |
| Vladimir Eshtrekov | Soviet Union | FW | 1968–73 | 102 | 11 |
| Valeri Fadeyev | Soviet Union | FW | 1959–66 | 147 | 17 |
| Genrikh Fedosov | Soviet Union | FW | 1954–61 | 145 | 48 |
| Leandro Fernández | Argentina | DF | 2006–14 | 207 | 15 |
| Roberto Fernández | Paraguay | DF | 2022–present | 61 | 6 |
| Yevgeni Fokin | Soviet Union | GK | 1936–40 | 66 | 0 |
| Daniil Fomin | Russia | MF | 2020–present | 137 | 27 |
| Vladimir Gabulov | Russia | GK | 2001, 2008–11, 2013–16 | 132 | 0 |
| Vali Gasimov | Azerbaijan | FW | 1992 | 17 | 16 |
| Yuri Gavrilov | Soviet Union | MF | 1973–77 | 37 | 5 |
| Valery Gazzaev | Soviet Union | FW | 1979–85 | 197 | 70 |
| Mikhail Gershkovich | Soviet Union | FW | 1972–79 | 146 | 21 |
| Yaroslav Gladyshev | Russia | FW | 2021–present | 75 | 17 |
| Vladimir Glotov | Soviet Union | DF | 1959–66 | 146 | 2 |
| Spartak Gogniyev | Russia | FW | 2000–01 | 28 | 7 |
| Aleksandr Golovnya | Soviet Union | DF | 1981–86 | 113 | 5 |
| Konstantin Golovskoy | Russia | MF | 1998–2001 | 49 | 10 |
| Nikolai Gontar | Soviet Union | GK | 1971–84 | 177 | 0 |
| Vladimir Granat | Russia | DF | 2005–06, 2007–14 | 188 | 3 |
| Aleksei Grinin | Soviet Union | FW | 1937–38 | 8 | 5 |
| Sergey Grishin | Russia | MF | 1996–2000 | 113 | 10 |
| Vitali Grishin | Russia | MF | 1997–2003 | 94 | 8 |
| Vyacheslav Grulyov | Russia | FW | 2017–25 | 121 | 18 |
| Gennadi Gusarov | Soviet Union | FW | 1963–68 | 125 | 24 |
| Rolan Gusev | Russia | MF | 1994–2001 | 127 | 22 |
| Sebastian Holmén | Sweden | DF | 2016–19 | 86 | 0 |
| Sergei Ilyin | Soviet Union | FW | 1936–45 | 105 | 49 |
| Vladimir Ilyin | Soviet Union | FW | 1946–57 | 157 | 63 |
| Aleksei Ionov | Russia | MF | 2013–16 | 76 | 18 |
| Lucky Isibor | Nigeria | FW | 1998–2000 | 51 | 5 |
| Pyotr Ivanov | Soviet Union | DF | 1949–50 | 60 | 0 |
| Vadim Ivanov | Soviet Union | DF | 1962–68 | 144 | 3 |
| Joãozinho | Russia | MF | 2018–20 | 49 | 6 |
| Yuriy Kalitvintsev | Ukraine | MF | 1992–94 | 48 | 8 |
| Vladimir Kapustin | Soviet Union | MF | 1978–84 | 38 | 5 |
| Vasili Karatayev | Soviet Union | MF | 1983–89 | 166 | 14 |
| Vasili Kartsev | Soviet Union | FW | 1945–51 | 106 | 72 |
| Aleksandr Kerzhakov | Russia | FW | 2008–09 | 51 | 19 |
| Vladimir Kesarev | Soviet Union | DF | 1955–65 | 195 | 1 |
| Aleksandr Khapsalis | Soviet Union | MF | 1983–85 | 72 | 0 |
| Yevgeni Kharlachyov | Russia | MF | 2001–03 | 42 | 7 |
| Anton Khazov | Russia | FW | 2001–03 | 45 | 15 |
| Dmitri Khokhlov | Russia | MF | 2006–10 | 130 | 11 |
| Aleksei Khomich | Soviet Union | GK | 1945–52 | 153 | 0 |
| Sergei Kiriakov | Russia | FW | 1986–92 | 91 | 9 |
| Valeri Kleymyonov | Russia | GK | 1992–97 | 64 | 0 |
| Denis Klyuyev | Russia | MF | 1994, 1999–2001 | 97 | 8 |
| Andrey Kobelev | Russia | MF | 1983–92, 1995–98, 2002 | 253 | 46 |
| Aleksandr Kokorin | Russia | FW | 2008–15 | 171 | 41 |
| Nikolai Kolesov | Soviet Union | MF | 1973–80 | 73 | 13 |
| Denis Kolodin | Russia | DF | 2005–13 | 132 | 15 |
| Sergei Kolotovkin | Russia | DF | 1995–96 | 56 | 0 |
| Igor Kolyvanov | Soviet Union | FW | 1985–91 | 140 | 42 |
| Dmitri Kombarov | Russia | MF | 2004–10 | 132 | 12 |
| Kirill Kombarov | Russia | MF | 2004–10 | 101 | 7 |
| Nikolay Komlichenko | Russia | FW | 2020–21 | 36 | 7 |
| Ivan Konov | Soviet Union | FW | 1949–53 | 62 | 41 |
| Erik Korchagin | Russia | FW | 2003–04 | 39 | 12 |
| Valery Korolenkov | Soviet Union | MF | 1958–67 | 175 | 31 |
| Ognjen Koroman | Serbia | MF | 2002–03 | 38 | 12 |
| Yuri Kovtun | Russia | DF | 1993–98 | 156 | 5 |
| Anatoli Kozhemyakin | Soviet Union | FW | 1970–74 | 62 | 24 |
| Aleksei Kozlov | Russia | DF | 2014–19 | 104 | 6 |
| Vladimir Kozlov | Soviet Union | FW | 1967–76 | 180 | 58 |
| Oleg Kramarenko | Soviet Union | MF | 1976–77 | 38 | 5 |
| Konstantin Krizhevsky | Soviet Union | DF | 1953–61 | 141 | 0 |
| Aliaksandr Kulchiy | Belarus | MF | 1997–99 | 62 | 4 |
| Kevin Kurányi | Germany | FW | 2010–15 | 123 | 50 |
| Aleksandr Kutitsky | Russia | FW | 2020–present | 57 | 1 |
| Aleksei Kutsenko | Russia | FW | 1991–97 | 43 | 5 |
| Boris Kuznetsov | Soviet Union | DF | 1953–61 | 163 | 1 |
| Yuri Kuznetsov | Russia | MF | 1995–99 | 48 | 13 |
| Yuri Kuznetsov | Soviet Union | FW | 1955–59 | 23 | 13 |
| Aleksei Lapshin | Soviet Union | MF | 1936–40 | 71 | 0 |
| Vladimir Larin | Soviet Union | MF | 1967, 1968–71, 1973 | 70 | 22 |
| Nikolai Latysh | Soviet Union | MF | 1979–83 | 124 | 20 |
| Diego Laxalt | Uruguay | DF | 2021–present | 62 | 0 |
| Viktor Leonenko | Ukraine | FW | 1991–92 | 20 | 14 |
| Daniil Lesovoy | Russia | MF | 2020–23 | 48 | 5 |
| Marko Lomić | Serbia | DF | 2010–14 | 95 | 1 |
| Viktor Losev | Russia | DF | 1986–92 | 169 | 0 |
| Yevgeni Lutsenko | Russia | FW | 2016–19 | 82 | 14 |
| Denis Makarov | Russia | MF | 2021–present | 81 | 12 |
| Aleksandr Makhovikov | Soviet Union | DF | 1970–83 | 287 | 20 |
| Aleksandr Maksimenkov | Soviet Union | MF | 1976–81 | 141 | 21 |
| Aleksandr Malyavkin | Soviet Union | FW | 1944–50 | 131 | 29 |
| Alakbar Mammadov | Soviet Union | FW | 1954–59 | 92 | 41 |
| Aleksei Mamykin | Soviet Union | FW | 1953–59 | 43 | 19 |
| Nicolás Marichal | Uruguay | DF | 2022–present | 58 | 0 |
| Valeri Maslov | Soviet Union | MF | 1961–71 | 319 | 50 |
| Valeri Matyunin | Soviet Union | FW | 1978–86 | 110 | 12 |
| Pascal Mendy | Senegal | DF | 2003–06 | 50 | 1 |
| Yuri Mentyukov | Soviet Union | MF | 1978–85 | 93 | 3 |
| Aleksandr Minayev | Soviet Union | MF | 1976–84 | 209 | 21 |
| Zvjezdan Misimović | Bosnia and Herzegovina | MF | 2011–12 | 44 | 8 |
| Aleksandr Molodtsov | Soviet Union | MF | 1978–87 | 127 | 13 |
| Grigori Morozov | Russia | DF | 2013–20 | 107 | 4 |
| Eduard Mudrik | Soviet Union | DF | 1957, 1959–68 | 172 | 5 |
| Aleksandr Nazarov | Soviet Union | FW | 1937–45 | 34 | 17 |
| Sergei Nekrasov | Russia | DF | 1991–99 | 149 | 12 |
| Moumi Ngamaleu | Cameroon | FW | 2022–present | 71 | 14 |
| Arkadi Nikolayev | Soviet Union | FW | 1959–64 | 103 | 17 |
| Sergei Nikulin | Soviet Union | DF | 1969–84 | 280 | 1 |
| Clinton N'Jie | Cameroon | FW | 2019–22 | 61 | 6 |
| Christian Noboa | Ecuador | MF | 2012–14 | 78 | 12 |
| Aleksandr Novikov | Soviet Union | DF | 1973–87 | 327 | 9 |
| Andrei Ostrovskiy | Belarus | DF | 1997–2000 | 88 | 7 |
| Kirill Panchenko | Russia | FW | 2016–20 | 98 | 36 |
| Anatoli Parov | Soviet Union | DF | 1975–80 | 75 | 0 |
| Sergei Parshivlyuk | Russia | DF | 2019–24 | 92 | 1 |
| Vadim Pavlenko | Soviet Union | FW | 1972–76, 1979 | 54 | 18 |
| Vasili Pavlov | Soviet Union | FW | 1936–40 | 16 | 10 |
| Aleksandr Petrov | Soviet Union | DF | 1945–51 | 139 | 0 |
| Aleksei Petrushin | Soviet Union | MF | 1970–81 | 244 | 21 |
| Maximilian Philipp | Germany | FW | 2019–20 | 20 | 8 |
| Vladimir Pilguy | Soviet Union | GK | 1970–81 | 223 | 0 |
| Ruslan Pimenov | Russia | FW | 2007–09 | 23 | 5 |
| Dmitri Polovinchuk | Russia | MF | 1999–2006 | 54 | 0 |
| Aleksei Ponomaryov | Soviet Union | FW | 1936–44 | 30 | 17 |
| Nikolai Postavnin | Soviet Union | MF | 1936, 1938–44, 1947 | 34 | 7 |
| Boris Pozdnyakov | Soviet Union | DF | 1985–86, 1987–89 | 108 | 4 |
| Aleksei Prudnikov | Soviet Union | GK | 1983–87 | 129 | 0 |
| Yuri Pudyshev | Soviet Union | MF | 1971–75, 1984–86 | 84 | 7 |
| Vsevolod Radikorskiy | Soviet Union | DF | 1938–48 | 122 | 0 |
| Aleksandr Rakitskiy | Soviet Union | GK | 1964–68 | 61 | 0 |
| Yuri Reznik | Soviet Union | MF | 1979–82 | 80 | 7 |
| Anatoli Rodionov | Soviet Union | DF | 1953–57 | 68 | 0 |
| Maksim Romaschenko | Belarus | MF | 1997–2000, 2004–06 | 124 | 24 |
| Adrian Ropotan | Romania | MF | 2009–11 | 52 | 2 |
| Georgi Ryabov | Soviet Union | DF | 1957, 1960–70 | 192 | 2 |
| Kirill Rybakov | Russia | FW | 1985–89, 1993–95 | 21 | 5 |
| Vladimir Rykov | Russia | FW | 2011–13, 2016–20 | 90 | 4 |
| Vladimir Ryzhkin | Soviet Union | FW | 1953–61 | 119 | 21 |
| Sergei Salnikov | Soviet Union | FW | 1950–54 | 113 | 29 |
| Oleg Samatov | Russia | MF | 1994–96 | 61 | 6 |
| Christopher Samba | Congo | DF | 2013–16 | 38 | 6 |
| Aleksandr Samedov | Russia | MF | 2010–12 | 69 | 9 |
| Valter Sanaya | Soviet Union | GK | 1947–53 | 63 | 0 |
| Aleksandr Sapeta | Russia | MF | 2011–13, 2016–17 | 97 | 5 |
| Vladimir Savdunin | Soviet Union | MF | 1945–56 | 189 | 63 |
| Deividas Šemberas | Lithuania | DF | 1998–2001 | 88 | 2 |
| Mikhail Semichastny | Soviet Union | FW | 1936–50 | 210 | 52 |
| Igor Semshov | Russia | MF | 2006–08, 2010–13 | 167 | 36 |
| Vladimir Shabrov | Soviet Union | FW | 1950–59 | 98 | 16 |
| Dmitri Shapovalov | Soviet Union | FW | 1954–61 | 96 | 33 |
| Anatoliy Shepel | Soviet Union | FW | 1975–76 | 39 | 14 |
| Andrei Shevtsov | Soviet Union | MF | 1981–84 | 54 | 2 |
| Sergei Shtanyuk | Belarus | DF | 1996–2000 | 114 | 9 |
| Vladimir Shtapov | Soviet Union | DF | 1964–71 | 150 | 0 |
| Anton Shunin | Russia | GK | 2007–24 | 339 | 0 |
| Sergei Silkin | Soviet Union | DF | 1980–89 | 101 | 1 |
| Igor Simutenkov | Russia | FW | 1990–94 | 104 | 44 |
| Igor Sklyarov | Russia | DF | 1987–94 | 130 | 5 |
| Vladimir Skokov | Russia | MF | 1997–98 | 52 | 5 |
| Dmitri Skopintsev | Russia | DF | 2020–present | 142 | 5 |
| Yevgeni Smertin | Russia | MF | 1988–94 | 121 | 3 |
| Andrei Smetanin | Russia | GK | 1987–98 | 129 | 0 |
| Aleksandr Smirnov | Russia | MF | 1985–90, 1994 | 36 | 9 |
| Vasili Smirnov | Soviet Union | FW | 1936–39 | 39 | 27 |
| Vladimir Smirnov | Soviet Union | DF | 1968–71 | 82 | 0 |
| Fyodor Smolov | Russia | FW | 2007–09, 2010–11, 2013, 2014, 2022–24 | 128 | 22 |
| Aleksandr Sokolov | Soviet Union | MF | 1949–60 | 164 | 26 |
| Leonid Solovyov | Soviet Union | DF | 1945–53 | 174 | 11 |
| Sergei Solovyov | Soviet Union | FW | 1940–52 | 209 | 135 |
| Anton Sosnin | Russia | MF | 2015–20 | 78 | 0 |
| Ivan Stankevich | Soviet Union | DF | 1940–48 | 66 | 0 |
| Sergei Stukashov | Soviet Union | FW | 1985–88 | 73 | 19 |
| Toni Šunjić | Bosnia and Herzegovina | DF | 2017–20 | 75 | 4 |
| Yuri Syomin | Soviet Union | MF | 1968–71 | 95 | 20 |
| Sebastian Szymański | Poland | MF | 2019–22 | 77 | 8 |
| Jovan Tanasijević | Montenegro | DF | 2003–05, 2007–09 | 138 | 1 |
| Aleksandr Tashayev | Russia | MF | 2011–18 | 66 | 6 |
| Bakhva Tedeyev | Russia | MF | 1993 | 30 | 8 |
| Ivan Temnikov | Russia | MF | 2016–19 | 55 | 7 |
| Aleksandr Tenyagin | Soviet Union | FW | 1951–53 | 41 | 6 |
| Oleg Teryokhin | Russia | FW | 1995–99 | 146 | 67 |
| Omari Tetradze | Russia | MF | 1991–94 | 101 | 11 |
| Yuri Tishkov | Russia | FW | 1993–97 | 45 | 6 |
| Aleksandr Tochilin | Russia | DF | 1995–2008 | 239 | 7 |
| Nikolai Tolstykh | Soviet Union | DF | 1974–83 | 125 | 6 |
| Vasili Trofimov | Soviet Union | FW | 1939–53 | 216 | 69 |
| Viktor Tsarev | Soviet Union | DF | 1953–66 | 279 | 11 |
| Vyacheslav Tsaryov | Russia | DF | 1988–94, 1997 | 76 | 1 |
| Dmytro Tyapushkin | Ukraine | GK | 1997–98 | 52 | 0 |
| Konstantin Tyukavin | Russia | FW | 2020–present | 122 | 40 |
| Aleksandr Uvarov | Soviet Union | GK | 1978–91 | 105 | 0 |
| Valeri Urin | Soviet Union | FW | 1956–61 | 68 | 19 |
| Mathieu Valbuena | France | MF | 2014–15 | 29 | 6 |
| Viktor Vasilyev | Soviet Union | MF | 1985–88 | 85 | 8 |
| Andriy Voronin | Ukraine | FW | 2010–12, 2013–14 | 80 | 22 |
| Yuri Vshivtsev | Soviet Union | FW | 1962–68 | 188 | 53 |
| Luke Wilkshire | Australia | DF | 2008–14, 2016–17 | 149 | 2 |
| Andrei Yakubik | Soviet Union | FW | 1967–79, 1980 | 170 | 35 |
| Mikhail Yakushin | Soviet Union | FW | 1936–41 | 95 | 44 |
| Erik Yakhimovich | Belarus | DF | 1994–97, 1998–2000 | 127 | 2 |
| Lev Yashin | Soviet Union | GK | 1950–70 | 326 | 0 |
| Sergei Yashin | Russia | MF | 1999–2006 | 67 | 5 |
| Yevgeni Yeliseyev | Soviet Union | MF | 1936–40 | 65 | 6 |
| Roman Yevgenyev | Russia | DF | 2016–22 | 77 | 1 |
| Gennady Yevriuzhikin | Soviet Union | FW | 1966–76 | 283 | 54 |
| Artur Yusupov | Russia | MF | 2009, 2011–15, 2019–20 | 130 | 8 |
| Arsen Zakharyan | Russia | MF | 2020–23 | 72 | 15 |
| Yuri Zhirkov | Russia | MF | 2013–15 | 54 | 4 |
| Yevgeni Zhukov | Soviet Union | DF | 1969–74 | 108 | 9 |
| Aleksandr Zotov | Russia | MF | 2016–18 | 44 | 5 |
| Vladimir Zyablikov | Soviet Union | DF | 1950–53 | 75 | 0 |
| Valeri Zykov | Soviet Union | DF | 1966–75 | 213 | 1 |

== First-choice line-ups ==
This section lists 11 players that played the most games in each season (the goalkeeper who played the most games in a season among goalkeepers is included even if he is not in the top eleven players for that season among all positions). If the data for minutes played is available, the players are selected based on that instead of games played.

| Season | Line-up |
|---|---|
| 1936 (spring) | Kvasnikov / Korchebokov, Teterin / Lapshin, Ryomin, Yeliseyev / S. Ilyin, Pavlov, Semichastny, Vasili Smirnov, Yakushin |
| 1936 (autumn) | Kvasnikov / Korchebokov / Korotkov, Lapshin, Ryomin, Yeliseyev / S. Ilyin, Semichastny, Vasili Smirnov, Yakushin |
| 1937 | Fokin / Korchebokov / Chernyshev, Kachalin, Lapshin, Yeliseyev / S. Ilyin, Ponomaryov, Semichastny, Vasili Smirnov, Yakushin |
| 1938 | Akimov / Korchebokov, Teterin / Chernyshev, Korotkov, Lapshin, Yeliseyev, Zabelin / S. Ilyin, Semichastny, Yakushin |
| 1939 | Fokin / Radikorskiy, Ryomin / Chernyshev, Lapshin, Postavnin / S. Ilyin, Nazarov, Semichastny, Trofimov, Yakushin |
| 1940 | Fokin / Radikorskiy, Stankevich / Chernyshev, Lapshin, Palyska / Dementyev, S. Ilyin, Semichastny, S. Solovyov, Yakushin |
| 1941 | Kochetov / Kiselyov, Radikorskiy / Chernyshev, Blinkov, Palyska / Beskov, Semichastny, S. Solovyov, Trofimov, Yakushin |
| 1945 | Khomich / Radikorskiy, Semichastny, Stankevich / Blinkov, L. Solovyov / Beskov, Kartsev, Malyavkin, S. Solovyov, Trofimov |
| 1946 | Khomich / Radikorskiy, Semichastny, Stankevich / Blinkov, L. Solovyov / Kartsev, Malyavkin, Savdunin, S. Solovyov, Trofimov |
| 1947 | Khomich / Petrov, Semichastny / Blinkov, L. Solovyov / Arkhangelskiy, Beskov, Kartsev, Malyavkin, S. Solovyov, Trofimov |
| 1948 | Khomich / Petrov, Semichastny / Blinkov, L. Solovyov / Beskov, Kartsev, Malyavkin, Savdunin, S. Solovyov, Trofimov |
| 1949 | Khomich / P. Ivanov, Petrov, Semichastny / Blinkov, Malyavkin, L. Solovyov / Beskov, Konov, Savdunin, S. Solovyov |
| 1950 | Khomich / P. Ivanov, Petrov, Zyablikov / Blinkov, Sokolov, L. Solovyov / Beskov, V. Ilyin, Salnikov, Trofimov |
| 1951 | Sanaya / Petrov, Zyablikov / Blinkov, Sokolov, Tenyagin / Beskov, Salnikov, Savdunin, S. Solovyov, Trofimov |
| 1952 | Sanaya / L. Solovyov, Zyablikov / Baykov, Blinkov / V. Ilyin, S. Solovyov, Salnikov, Savdunin, Tenyagin, Trofimov |
| 1953 | Yashin / Kuznetsov, Rodionov, L. Solovyov / Baykov / Beskov, V. Ilyin, S. Korshunov, Ryzhkin, Salnikov, Savdunin |
| 1954 | Yashin / Krizhevsky, Kuznetsov, Rodionov / Baykov, Savdunin / Bondarenko, V. Ilyin, Mammadov, Salnikov, Shabrov |
| 1955 | Yashin / Krizhevsky, Kuznetsov, Rodionov / Baykov, Ryzhkin, Savdunin / Fedosov, V. Ilyin, Mammadov, Shabrov |
| 1956 | Yashin / Kesarev, Krizhevsky, Kuznetsov / Ryzhkin, Sokolov, Viktor Tsaryov / Fedosov, V. Ilyin, Mammadov, Shabrov |
| 1957 | Yashin / Kesarev, Krizhevsky, Kuznetsov / Ryzhkin, Sokolov, Viktor Tsaryov / Fedosov, Mamykin, Mammadov, Shapovalov |
| 1958 | Belyayev / Kesarev, Krizhevsky, Kuznetsov / Ryzhkin, Sokolov, Viktor Tsaryov / Fedosov, Mammadov, Shapovalov, Urin |
| 1959 | Yashin / Kesarev, Krizhevsky, Kuznetsov / Korolenkov, Sokolov, Viktor Tsaryov / Chislenko, Fedosov, A. Korshunov, Shapovalov |
| 1960 | Yashin / Glotov, Krizhevsky, Mudrik, Ryabov / Viktor Tsaryov / Chislenko, Fadeyev, Fedosov, Shapovalov, Urin |
| 1961 | Yashin / Anichkin, Glotov, Kesarev, Ryabov / Korolenkov, Viktor Tsaryov / Apshev, Chislenko, Fedosov, Nikolayev |
| 1962 | Yashin / Glotov, Kesarev, Mudrik, Ryabov / Korolenkov, Viktor Tsaryov / Chislenko, Fadeyev, Maslov, Nikolayev |
| 1963 | Yashin / Anichkin, Kesarev, Mudrik, Viktor Tsaryov / Korolenkov, Maslov / Bobkov, Chislenko, Fadeyev, Vshivtsev |
| 1964 | Yashin / Anichkin, Glotov, Mudrik / Maslov / Avrutskiy, Bobkov, Chislenko, Fadeyev, Korolenkov, Vshivtsev |
| 1965 | Yashin / Glotov, V. Ivanov, Mudrik, Viktor Tsaryov / Maslov / Avrutskiy, Bobkov, Chislenko, Gusarov, Vshivtsev |
| 1966 | Rakitskiy / Anichkin, V. Ivanov, Mudrik, Viktor Tsaryov, Zykov / Maslov / Avrutskiy, Bobkov, Vshivtsev, Yevriuzhikin |
| 1967 | Yashin / Anichkin, V. Ivanov, Ryabov, Shtapov, Zykov / Dudko, Maslov / Gusarov, Vshivtsev, Yevriuzhikin |
| 1968 | Yashin / Anichkin, Dolbonosov, V. Ivanov, Ryabov, Shtapov, Zykov / Larin, Maslov / V. Kozlov, Yevriuzhikin |
| 1969 | Yashin / Anichkin, Ryabov, Shtapov, Vladimir Smirnov, Zykov / Larin, Maslov, Syomin / Avrutskiy, Yevriuzhikin |
| 1970 | Pilguy / Shtapov, Vladimir Smirnov, Zykov / Anichkin, Maslov, Syomin / Avrutskiy, Eshtrekov, V. Kozlov, Yevriuzhikin |
| 1971 | Pilguy / Grebnev, Shtapov, Zhukov, Zykov / Sabo, Syomin / Eshtrekov, Kozhemyakin, V. Kozlov, Yevriuzhikin |
| 1972 | Pilguy / Basalayev, Dolbonosov, Makhovikov, Zhukov, Zykov / Sabo, Yakubik / Baidachny, Eshtrekov, Yevriuzhikin |
| 1973 | Pilguy / Basalayev, Dolbonosov, Nikulin, Zykov / Dolmatov, Makhovikov, Petrushin, Zhukov / Kozhemyakin, Yevriuzhikin |
| 1974 | Pilguy / Basalayev, Dolbonosov, Nikulin / Makhovikov, Petrushin, Pudyshev / Baidachny, V. Kozlov, Pavlenko, Yevriuzhikin |
| 1975 | Gontar / Bubnov, Nikulin, Zenkov / Dolmatov, Petrushin, Makhovikov, Yakubik / Gershkovich, Shepel, Yevriuzhikin |
| 1976 (spring) | Gontar / Nikulin, Novikov, Parov / Kramarenko, Maksimenkov, Petrushin, Yakubik / Gershkovich, Shepel, Yevriuzhikin |
| 1976 (autumn) | Gontar / Bubnov, Makhovikov, Nikulin, Parov / Dolmatov, Kramarenko, Minayev, Yakubik / Gershkovich, Kazachyonok |
| 1977 | Pilguy / Bubnov, Novikov, Parov / Dolmatov, Maksimenkov, Minayev, Petrushin, Yakubik / Gershkovich, Kazachyonok |
| 1978 | Gontar / Bubnov, Makhovikov, Novikov / Dolmatov, Maksimenkov, Minayev, Petrushin / Gershkovich, Kazachyonok, Kolesov |
| 1979 | Gontar / Bubnov, Makhovikov, Nikulin, Novikov / Maksimenkov, Minayev, Petrushin, Reznik / Gazzaev, Kolesov |
| 1980 | Pilguy / Bubnov, Makhovikov, Nikulin, Novikov / Latysh, Maksimenkov, Minayev, Petrushin, Reznik / Gazzaev |
| 1981 | Gontar / Bubnov, Makhovikov, Nikulin, Tolstykh / Adzhoyev, Latysh, Minayev, Molodtsov, Reznik / Gazzaev |
| 1982 | Gontar / Golovnya, Novikov, Tolstykh / Adzhoyev, Latysh, Matyunin, Minayev, Molodtsov, Shevtsov / Gazzaev |
| 1983 | Prudnikov / Golovnya, Novikov, Tolstykh / Borodyuk, Khapsalis, Latysh, Matyunin, Mentyukov, Molodtsov / Gazzaev |
| 1984 | Prudnikov / Bulanov, Fomichyov, Golovnya, Novikov / Ataulin, Borodyuk, Karatayev, Khapsalis, Mentyukov / Gazzaev |
| 1985 | Prudnikov / Bulanov, Golovnya, Novikov, Pozdnyakov / Ataulin, Borodyuk, Karatayev, Pudyshev / Stukashov, Vasilyev |
| 1986 | Prudnikov / Bulanov, Losev, Novikov, Silkin / Dobrovolski, Karatayev, Pozdnyakov, Vasilyev / Borodyuk, Stukashov |
| 1987 | Prudnikov / Bulanov, Losev, Novikov, Silkin, Sklyarov / Dobrovolski, Timoshenko, Vasilyev / Borodyuk, Kolyvanov |
| 1988 | Kharine / Bulanov, Losev, Morozov, Pozdnyakov, Silkin, Sklyarov / Dobrovolski, Karatayev / Borodyuk, Kolyvanov |
| 1989 | Kharine / Chernyshov, Losev, Mokh, Sklyarov / Derkach, Dobrovolski, Karatayev, Kobelev / Kiriakov, Kolyvanov |
| 1990 | Uvarov / Chernyshov, Losev, Mokh, Sklyarov / Derkach, Kobelev, Sereda, Ye. Smertin / Kiriakov, Kolyvanov |
| 1991 | Uvarov / Chernyshov, Losev, Vyacheslav Tsaryov / Kobelev, Sereda, Ye. Smertin, Tetradze / Kiriakov, Kolyvanov, Simutenkov |
| 1992 | Smetanin / Dolgov, Losev, Sklyarov, Vyacheslav Tsaryov / Derkach, Kalitvintsev, Kobelev, Tetradze / Gasimov, Simutenkov |
| 1993 | Kleymyonov / Kovtun, Timofeev, Vyacheslav Tsaryov / Dobrovolski, Kalitvintsev, Ye. Smertin, Tedeyev, Tetradze / Cheryshev, Simutenkov |
| 1994 | Smetanin / Chernyshov, Kovtun, Shulgin / Klyuyev, Nekrasov, Samatov, A. Smirnov, Tetradze / Cheryshev, Simutenkov |
| 1995 | Smetanin / Kolotovkin, Kovtun, Sabitov, Yakhimovich / Nekrasov, Podpaly, Safronov, Samatov / Cheryshev, Teryokhin |
| 1996 | Smetanin / Kolotovkin, Kovtun, Shtanyuk, Yakhimovich / A. Grishin, S. Grishin, Kobelev, Nekrasov / Cheryshev, Teryokhin |
| 1997 | Tyapushkin / Kovtun, Ostrovskiy, Shtanyuk, Tochilin / S. Grishin, Kobelev, Kulchy, Nekrasov, Skokov / Teryokhin |
| 1998 | Tyapushkin / Kovtun, Nekrasov, Ostrovskiy, Shtanyuk / S. Grishin, Kobelev, Kulchy, Romaschenko / Isibor, Teryokhin |
| 1999 | Plotnikov / Golovskoy, Ostrovskiy, Šemberas, Tochilin, Yakhimovich / S. Grishin, Gusev, Klyuyev, Romaschenko / Teryokhin |
| 2000 | Kramarenko / Ayupov, A.V. Kozlov, Šemberas, Shtanyuk, Tochilin, Yakhimovich / S. Grishin, Klyuyev, Gusev, Romaschenko / - |
| 2001 | Kramarenko / K. Novikov, Šemberas, Tochilin, Zharinov, Žutautas / Bystrov, V. Grishin, Gusev, Klyuyev / Bulykin |
| 2002 | Berezovsky / Brabec, Covalenco, Hyský, Tochilin / Česnauskis, Dyatel, Kharlachyov, Koroman / Bulykin, Panov |
| 2003 | Berezovsky / Batak, Hanek, Mendy, Tanasijević, Tochilin / Baltiev, Česnauskis, V. Grishin / Bulykin, Korchagin |
| 2004 | Berezovsky / Batak, Hanek, Mendy, Tanasijević / Dyatel, Hašek, Polovinchuk, S. Yashin / Bulykin, Gyan |
| 2005 | Berezovsky / Frechaut, Kolodin, Jorge Ribeiro, Tanasijević, Tochilin / Danny, Maniche, Polovinchuk, S. Yashin / Derlei |
| 2006 | Karčemarskas / L. Fernández, Jean, Kolodin / Danny, Khokhlov, D. Kombarov, Romaschenko, Semshov, A. Smertin / Derlei |
| 2007 | Shunin / L. Fernández, Granat, Kolodin, Tanasijević / Danny, Khokhlov, D. Kombarov, K. Kombarov, Semshov / Pimenov |
| 2008 | Gabulov / L. Fernández, Kolodin, Kowalczyk, Tanasijević / Danny, Khokhlov, D. Kombarov, K. Kombarov, Semshov / Kerzhakov |
| 2009 | Gabulov / L. Fernández, Granat, Kolodin, Kowalczyk / Khokhlov, D. Kombarov, K. Kombarov, Wilkshire / Kerzhakov, Kokorin |
| 2010 | Gabulov / Epureanu, L. Fernández, Granat, Kolodin, Wilkshire / Ropotan, Samedov, Semshov / Kurányi, Voronin |
| 2011–12 | Shunin / L. Fernández, Granat, Lomić, Wilkshire / Misimović, Samedov, Semshov / Kokorin, Kurányi, Voronin |
| 2012–13 | Shunin / L. Fernández, Granat, Lomić, Wilkshire / Dzsudzsák, Jantscher, Noboa, Yusupov / Kokorin, Kurányi |
| 2013–14 | Gabulov / Douglas, Granat, Lomić, Wilkshire / Denisov, Dzsudzsák, Ionov, Noboa, Yusupov / Kokorin |
| 2014–15 | Gabulov / Douglas, Samba, Zhirkov / Dzsudzsák, Ionov, Vainqueur, Valbuena, Yusupov / Kokorin, Kurányi |
| 2015–16 | Gabulov / Dyakov, Hubočan, A.A. Kozlov, Morozov / Denisov, Ionov, Sosnin, Zhirkov, Zobnin / Tashayev |
| 2016–17 | Shunin / Belorukov, Holmén, Morozov, Rykov, Terekhov / Katrich, Sapeta, Zotov / Bećiraj, Panchenko |
| 2017–18 | Shunin / Holmén, A.A. Kozlov, Rykov, Šunjić, Terekhov / Panchenko, Sosnin, Sow, Tashayev / Lutsenko |
| 2018–19 | Shunin / Holmén, A.A. Kozlov, Morozov, Šunjić, Yevgenyev / Černych, Panchenko, Tetteh / Joãozinho, Lutsenko |
| 2019–20 | Shunin / Morozov, Ordets, Rykov, Šunjić / Joãozinho, Neustädter, Rausch, Szymański, Yusupov / Sly |
| 2020–21 | Shunin / Ordets, Parshivlyuk, Skopintsev, Varela, Yevgenyev / Fomin, Moro, Szymański / Grulyov, Lesovoy |
| 2021–22 | Shunin / Balbuena, Ordets, Skopintsev, Varela / Fomin, Makarov, Moro, Szymański, Zakharyan / Tyukavin |
| 2022–23 | Shunin / Dasa, R. Fernández, Sazonov, Skopintsev / Fomin, Kutitsky, Makarov, Zakharyan / Smolov, Tyukavin |
| 2023–24 | Leshchuk–Shunin (Note: Leshchuk and Shunin each played 15 full games) / Balbuena, Dasa, R. Fernández, Skopintsev / Bitello, Chávez, Fomin, Laxalt / Ngamaleu, Tyukavin |
