= 1977 Season's Cup =

Dinamo Kiev	Dinamo Moscow
0	1
- Date: 20 November 1977
- Venue: Stadion Dinamo imeni Lenina, Tbilisi
- Referee: Georgi Bakanidze
- Attendance: 35,000

The 1977 Season's Cup (Кубок сезона) was the first edition of Soviet Super Cup, an annual football match contested by the winners of the previous season's Soviet Top League and Soviet Cup competitions.

The match was played at the Stadion Dinamo imeni Lenina, Tbilisi, on 20 November 1977, and contested by league winner Dinamo Kiev and cup winner Dinamo Moscow. Dinamo Moscow won it 1–0.

== Match ==
=== Details ===
20 November 1977

Dinamo Kiev	0–1	Dinamo Moscow
	Report	Minayev 54'

Stadion Dinamo imeni Lenina, Tbilisi
Attendance: 35,000
Referee: Georgi Bakanidze

Dinamo Kiev	Dinamo Moscow

GK	(Soviet Union) Viktor Yurkovskyi
DF	(Soviet Union) Anatoliy Konkov
DF	(Soviet Union) Oleksandr Berezhnoy	(yellow card) ?'
DF	(Soviet Union) Mykhailo Fomenko
DF	(Soviet Union) Stefan Reshko		(substituted off) 80'
DF	(Soviet Union) Volodymyr Lozynskyi
MF	(Soviet Union) Leonid Buryak
MF	(Soviet Union) Volodymyr Bezsonov
MF	(Soviet Union) Viktor Kolotov (c)
FW	(Soviet Union) Volodymyr Veremeyev		(substituted off) 73'
FW	(Soviet Union) Oleh Blokhin
Substitutes:
MF	(Soviet Union) Serhiy Kuznetsov		(substituted in) 73'
MF	(Soviet Union) Volodymyr Onyshchenko		(substituted in) 80'
Manager :
	(Soviet Union) Valeriy Lobanovskyi

GK	(Soviet Union) Vladimir Pilguy
DF	(Soviet Union) Anatoli Parov		(substituted off) 46'
FW	(Soviet Union) Vladimir Kazachyonok
DF	(Soviet Union) Aleksandr Makhovikov
DF	(Soviet Union) Aleksandr Bubnov
MF	(Soviet Union) Aleksei Petrushin
FW	(Soviet Union) Mikhail Gershkovich		(substituted off) 80'
MF	(Soviet Union) Oleg Dolmatov (c)
MF	(Soviet Union) Andrei Yakubik
MF	(Soviet Union) Aleksandr Maksimenkov
MF	(Soviet Union) Aleksandr Minayev	54'
Substitutes:
DF	(Soviet Union) Sergei Nikulin		(substituted in) 46'
MF	(Soviet Union) Nikolai Kolesov		(substituted in) 46'
Manager :
	(Soviet Union) Aleksandr Sevidov
