= 1955 Soviet Top League =

17th season of top-tier football league in Soviet Union

Soviet Top League
- Season: 1955

12 teams took part in the league with FC Dynamo Moscow winning the championship.

== League standings ==
Pos	Team	Pld	W	D	L	GF	GA	GD	Pts	Qualification
1	(Russian Soviet Federative Socialist Republic) Dynamo Moscow (C)	22	15	4	3	52	16	+36	34	League champions
2	(Russian Soviet Federative Socialist Republic) Spartak Moscow	22	15	3	4	55	27	+28	33	
3	(Russian Soviet Federative Socialist Republic) CDSA Moscow	22	12	7	3	35	20	+15	31	
4	(Russian Soviet Federative Socialist Republic) Torpedo Moscow	22	10	8	4	39	32	+7	28	
5	(Russian Soviet Federative Socialist Republic) Lokomotiv Moscow	22	9	7	6	32	27	+5	25	
6	(Ukrainian Soviet Socialist Republic) Dynamo Kiev	22	8	6	8	31	37	−6	22	
7	(Ukrainian Soviet Socialist Republic) Shakhtyor Stalino	22	4	10	8	23	34	−11	18	
8	(Russian Soviet Federative Socialist Republic) Zenit Leningrad	22	5	8	9	23	36	−13	18	
9	(Georgian Soviet Socialist Republic) Dynamo Tbilisi	22	6	4	12	25	36	−11	16	
10	(Russian Soviet Federative Socialist Republic) Trudovyye Rezervy Leningrad	22	5	6	11	28	41	−13	16	
11	(Russian Soviet Federative Socialist Republic) Krylia Sovetov Kuybyshev (R)	22	4	5	13	21	39	−18	13	Relegation to Class B
12	(Byelorussian Soviet Socialist Republic) Spartak Minsk (R)	22	2	6	14	13	32	−19	10	Relegation to Class B

Source: rsssf.com
(C) Champions; (R) Relegated

== Results ==
Home \ Away	CDS	DYK	DMN	DTB	KRY	LOK	SHA	SMN	SPA	TOR	TRL	ZEN
CDSA Moscow		1–1	1–1	2–0	2–1	1–0	4–0	1–0	2–2	0–0	1–0	4–1
Dynamo Kiev	3–2		1–4	2–1	4–1	0–0	1–0	3–2	0–0	1–3	3–2	1–2
Dynamo Moscow	4–0	2–1		1–0	2–0	4–1	6–0	0–0	1–4	2–0	3–0	0–1
Dynamo Tbilisi	0–3	2–2	2–6		0–2	2–3	3–1	1–1	1–2	3–1	4–1	3–0
Krylia Sovetov Kuybyshev	0–1	0–2	0–6	0–0		1–2	1–1	2–0	1–0	0–1	0–0	1–2
Lokomotiv Moscow	0–0	2–1	1–2	1–0	2–2		1–1	1–0	4–5	0–0	0–2	2–1
Shakhtyor Stalino	1–2	0–0	0–3	0–1	2–1	0–0		3–0	2–0	1–1	2–2	0–0
Spartak Minsk	0–0	1–2	1–1	1–0	0–1	0–1	1–1		0–3	2–3	3–0	0–1
Spartak Moscow	1–3	4–0	2–1	5–0	4–2	2–1	4–3	2–0		3–4	4–1	2–0
Torpedo Moscow	4–3	5–2	1–1	1–1	2–1	1–4	1–3	1–1	0–0		2–1	4–1
Trudovyye Rezervy Leningrad	1–1	2–0	0–1	1–0	4–2	1–5	1–1	3–0	1–2	0–2		2–2
Zenit Leningrad	0–1	1–1	0–1	0–1	2–2	1–1	1–1	2–0	0–4	2–2	3–3	

Legend: Blue = home team win; Yellow = draw; Red = away team win.

== Top scorers ==
15 goals

- Eduard Streltsov (Torpedo Moscow)

13 goals

- Nikolai Parshin (Spartak Moscow)

12 goals

- Vladimir Ilyin (Dynamo Moscow)
- Sergei Salnikov (Spartak Moscow)

10 goals

- Mykhaylo Koman (Dynamo Kiev)

9 goals

- Genrikh Fedosov (Dynamo Moscow)
- Avtandil Gogoberidze (Dinamo Tbilisi)
- Viktor Razumovsky (Lokomotiv Moscow)

8 goals

- Yuri Belyayev (CDSA Moscow)
- Aleksei Kolobov (Trudovyye Rezervy Leningrad)
- Alakbar Mammadov (Dynamo Moscow)
- Viktor Terentyev (Dinamo Kiev)
- Valentin Yemyshev (CDSA Moscow)
