= Matyunin =

Matyunin (Russian: Матюнин), feminine Matyunina (Russian: Матюнина), is a Russian surname. Notable people with the surname include:

- Aleksei Matyunin (born 1982), Russian football referee
- Valeri Matyunin (1960–2018), Russian football player and referee, father of Aleksei
