= Urin =

Urin (Russian: Урин) may refer to

- Urine, a liquid by-product of metabolism in animals
- Húrin, a fictional character in the Middle-earth legendarium of J. R. R. Tolkien
- Valeri Urin (1934–2023), Soviet football player and coach
- Vladimir Urin (born 1947), Russian theatre artist and director
