= Shepel =

Shepel (Russian: Шепель) is a gender-neutral Slavic surname. Notable people with the surname include:

- Anatoliy Shepel (born 1949), Ukrainian football player
- Dmitry Shepel (born 1977), Russian speed skater
