= Boris Pozdnyakov =

Russian footballer

Personal information
- Full name: Boris Aleksandrovich Pozdnyakov
- Date of birth: 31 May 1962 (age 64)
- Place of birth: Moscow, USSR
- Height: 1.80 m (5 ft 11 in)
- Position: Defender

Youth career
- FC Spartak Moscow

Senior career*
Years	Team	Apps	(Gls)
1978–1984	FC Spartak Moscow	95	(3)
1985–1987	FC Dynamo Moscow	60	(2)
1987	FC Torpedo Moscow	9	(1)
1988–1989	FC Dynamo Moscow	48	(2)
1989–1991	FC Spartak Moscow	50	(0)
1991–1993	FC Stahl Linz	51	(1)
1993–1994	LASK Linz		
1994–1995	FC Linz	30	(0)
1996	FC Chernomorets Novorossiysk	13	(0)
1997	FC Kosmos Dolgoprudny	18	(1)
1998–2000	FC Sportakademklub Moscow	62	(1)

International career
1984–1987	USSR	7	(0)

Managerial career
- 1998–1999: FC Sportakademklub Moscow (assistant)
- 2001: FC Shatura (consultant)
- 2002–2004: FC Spartak Moscow (scout)
- 2006–2009: FC Saturn Ramenskoye (scout)
- 2009–2011: FC Spartak Moscow (assistant)
- * Club domestic league appearances and goals

Boris Aleksandrovich Pozdnyakov (Russian: Борис Александрович Поздняков; born 31 May 1962) is a Russian football coach and a former player.

== Honours ==
- Soviet Top League winner: 1989.
- Soviet Top League runner-up: 1980, 1981, 1983, 1984, 1986, 1991.
- Soviet Top League bronze: 1982.
- 1990 UEFA European Under-21 Football Championship winner.

== International career ==
Podznyakov made his debut for USSR on 28 March 1984 in a friendly against West Germany. He played in the 1986 FIFA World Cup qualifiers.
