= Nikolai Bobkov =

Soviet footballer

Personal information
- Full name: Nikolai Vasilyevich Bobkov
- Date of birth: November 30, 1940 (age 85)
- Place of birth: Rastorguyevo, USSR
- Position: Midfielder

Youth career
- Cox-Gaz Plant Vidnoye

Senior career*
Years	Team	Apps	(Gls)
1961	FC Shinnik Yaroslavl		
1962–1968	FC Dynamo Moscow	142	(12)
1969	FC Dynamo Barnaul		
- * Club domestic league appearances and goals

Nikolai Vasilyevich Bobkov (Russian: Николай Васильевич Бобков) (born November 30, 1940, in Rastorguyevo) is a retired Soviet football player.

== Honours ==
- Soviet Top League winner: 1963.
- Soviet Top League runner-up: 1962, 1967.
- Soviet Cup winner: 1967.
