= Lev Korchebokov =

Soviet Russian footballer and manager

Personal information
- Full name: Lev Nikolayevich Korchebokov
- Date of birth: 11 March 1907
- Place of birth: Tsarskoye Selo, Saint Petersburg Governorate, Russian Empire
- Date of death: 16 September 1971 (aged 64)
- Place of death: Riga, Latvian SSR, Soviet Union
- Height: 1.78 m (5 ft 10 in)
- Position: Defender

Youth career
- FC Union Moscow

Senior career*
Years	Team	Apps	(Gls)
1922	FC Union Moscow		
1923–1924	FC Kommunalniki Moscow		
1925–1935	FC Dynamo Moscow		
1936–1938	FC Dynamo Moscow	40	(0)

Managerial career
- 1939: FC Dynamo Moscow
- 1941: FC Dinamo Minsk
- 1942–1944: FC Dynamo II Moscow
- 1944: FC Dynamo Moscow
- 1946: FC Dynamo Kyiv
- 1947–1950: FC Dinamo Minsk
- 1950: FC Dynamo Saratov (consultant)
- 1955: FC Energiya Saratov
- 1962–1963: Zvejnieks Liepāja
- 1963–1965: Daugava Rīga
- 1966–1967: Zvejnieks Liepāja
- * Club domestic league appearances and goals

Lev Nikolayevich Korchebokov (Russian: Лев Николаевич Корчебоков; 11 March 1907 in Tsarskoye Selo – 16 September 1971 in Riga) was a Soviet and Russian football player and manager.

== Honours as a player ==
- Soviet Top League champion: 1936 (spring), 1937.
- Soviet Cup winner: 1937.
