= Vladimir Kesarev =

Soviet Russian footballer

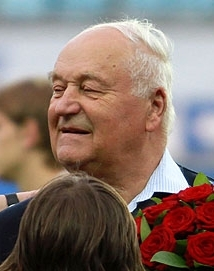
- Kesarev in 2011

Personal information
- Full name: Vladimir Petrovich Kesarev
- Date of birth: 26 February 1930
- Place of birth: Moscow, Soviet Union
- Date of death: 19 January 2015 (aged 84)
- Place of death: Moscow, Russia
- Position: Defender

Youth career
- Mashinostroitel' Moscow

Senior career*
| Years | Team | Apps | (Gls) |
| 1956–1965 | FC Dynamo Moscow | 194 | (1) |

International career
| 1957–1960 | USSR | 14 | (0) |

Managerial career
- 1967–1980: FC Dynamo Moscow (youth teams)
- 1981–1984: FC Dynamo Vologda
- 1985: Dynamo Kashira
- 1986: FC Dynamo Makhachkala
- 1990–1991: Dynamo Yakutsk
Medal record
Representing Soviet Union
UEFA European Championship
| Winner | 1960 France |
- * Club domestic league appearances and goals

Vladimir Petrovich Kesarev (Russian: Владимир Петрович Кесарев; 26 February 1930 – 19 January 2015) was a Soviet Russian footballer.

== Honours ==
- Soviet Top League winner: 1957, 1959, 1963.

== International career ==
He earned 14 caps for the USSR national football team, and participated in the 1958 FIFA World Cup. He was selected in the squad for the first ever European Nations' Cup in 1960, where the Soviets were champions, but did not play in any games at the tournament.
