= Boris Kuznetsov (footballer, born 1928) =

Russian and Soviet footballer

Personal information
- Full name: Boris Dmitriyevich Kuznetsov
- Date of birth: 14 July 1928
- Place of birth: Moscow, Soviet Union
- Date of death: 3 December 1999 (aged 71)
- Place of death: Moscow, Russia
- Height: 1.73 m (5 ft 8 in)
- Position: Defender

Senior career*
Years	Team	Apps	(Gls)
1946–1949	MVO Moscow		
1950	CDKA Moscow	0	(0)
1951–1953	MVO Kalinin	27	(0)
1953–1961	Dynamo Moscow	163	(1)

International career
1954–1959	Soviet Union	26	(0)
- * Club domestic league appearances and goals

Olympic medal record

Representing the Soviet Union

Men's Football

Olympic Games
Gold medal – first place	1956 Melbourne	Team competition

Boris Dmitriyevich Kuznetsov (Russian: Борис Дмитриевич Кузнецов; born 14 July 1928; died 3 December 1999) was a Russian and Soviet footballer. He was capped 26 times for Soviet Union, playing the 1958 FIFA World Cup. He also won the gold medal as part of the Soviet team at the 1956 Summer Olympics.
