= Vasili Trofimov =

Russian footballer (1919–1999)

Personal information
- Full name: Vasili Dmitriyevich Trofimov
- Date of birth: 7 January 1919
- Place of birth: Kostino, Moscow Oblast, Russia
- Date of death: 22 September 1999 (aged 80)
- Place of death: Moscow, Russia
- Height: 1.61 m (5 ft 3 in)
- Position: Striker

Youth career
- FC Dynamo Bolshevo

Senior career*
Years	Team	Apps	(Gls)
1939–1953	FC Dynamo Moscow	216	(69)

International career
1952	USSR	3	(2)

Managerial career
- 1963–1964: USSR (assistant)
- * Club domestic league appearances and goals

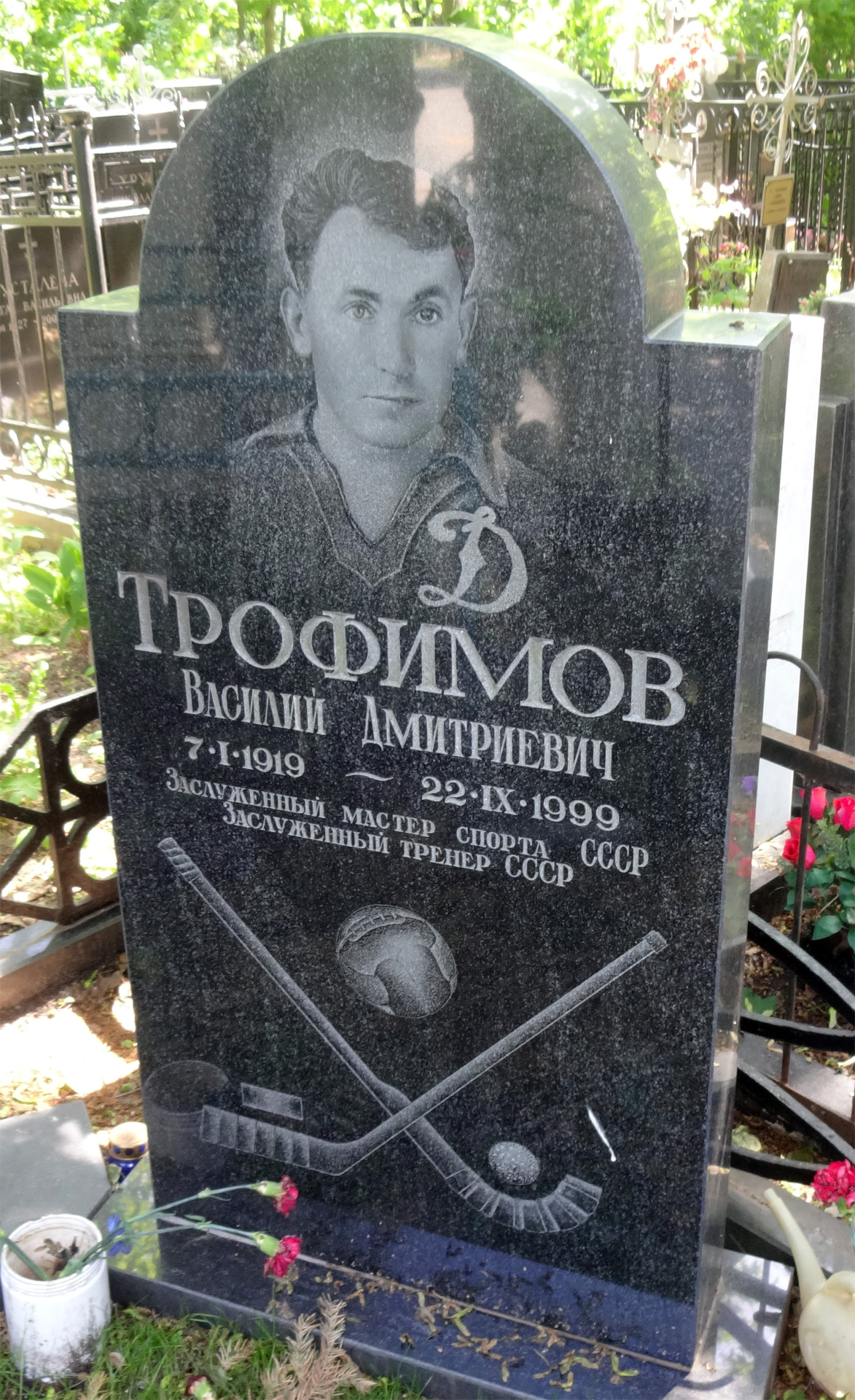
Grave in Vagankovo Cemetery

Vasili Dmitriyevich Trofimov (Russian: Василий Дмитриевич Трофимов; born 7 January 1919; died 22 September 1999) was a Soviet football player.

== Career ==
The USSR champion in three sports: football (1940, 1945, 1949), ice hockey (1947), and bandy (1951, 1952) in the Dynamo (Moscow) teams.

Trofimov made his debut for USSR on 15 July 1952 in a 1952 Olympics game against Bulgaria and scored on his debut. He also scored a goal against Yugoslavia.

From 1964 to 1981, he served as the senior coach of the Soviet Union national bandy team. Under his leadership they were world champions for eight seasons in a row.

== Honours ==
- Soviet Top League champion: 1940, 1945, 1949.
- Finalist of Soviet Cup: 1945, 1950.
