= Vladimir Belyayev (footballer) =

Soviet footballer

Personal information
- Full name: Vladimir Georgiyevich Belyayev
- Date of birth: 15 September 1933
- Place of birth: Nalchik, USSR
- Date of death: 23 January 2001 (aged 67)
- Position: Goalkeeper

Youth career
- Dynamo Nalchik
- 1951–1952: Dynamo Stalingrad

Senior career*
Years	Team	Apps	(Gls)
1953–1964	Dynamo Moscow	84	

International career
1957–1958	USSR	5	

Managerial career
- 1973–1974: Spartak Nalchik (assistant)
- * Club domestic league appearances and goals

Vladimir Georgiyevich Belyayev (Russian: Владимир Георгиевич Беляев) (15 September 1933 in Nalchik – 23 January 2001) was a Soviet football player.

== Honours ==
- Soviet Top League winner: 1957, 1959, 1963.
- Soviet Cup winner: 1953.

== International career ==
Belyayev made his debut for USSR on 15 August 1957 in a 1958 FIFA World Cup qualifier against Finland. He was selected for the World Cup final tournament squad, but did not play in any games there. He also played in a 1960 European Nations' Cup qualifier.
