= Vladimir Nikolaevich Smirnov =

Soviet footballer

Vladimir Smirnov
Personal information
- Full name: Vladimir Nikolaevich Smirnov
- Date of birth: 15 April 1947
- Place of birth: Krasnodar, Russian SFSR
- Date of death: 8 May 2014 (aged 67)
- Place of death: Moscow, Russia
- Height: 1.81 m (5 ft 11 1/2 in)
- Position: Defender

Senior career*
Years	Team	Apps	(Gls)
1965–1967	FC Kuban Krasnodar	75	(0)
1968–1971	FC Dynamo Moscow	82	(0)
- * Club domestic league appearances and goals

Vladimir Nikolaevich Smirnov (Russian: Влади́мир Никола́евич Смирно́в; 15 April 1947 – 8 May 2014) was a Soviet association football defender.

== Club career ==
He played 75 games for Kuban in 1965–67 and 82 games for FC Dynamo Moscow in 1968-71.
