= Aleksandr Tenyagin =

Soviet footballer and manager

Personal information
- Full name: Aleksandr Aleksandrovich Tenyagin
- Date of birth: 16 August 1927
- Place of birth: Trotsk, Russian SFSR, Soviet Union
- Date of death: 26 March 2008 (aged 80)
- Place of death: Saint Petersburg, Russia
- Height: 1.77 m (5 ft 10 in)
- Position: Striker

Youth career
- FC Dynamo Leningrad

Senior career*
| Years | Team | Apps | (Gls) |
| 1947–1950 | Dynamo Leningrad | 66 | (14) |
| 1951–1953 | FC Dynamo Moscow | 41 | (6) |
| 1953 | Dynamo Leningrad | 10 | (1) |
| 1954–1956 | Trudovye Rezervy Leningrad | 68 | (11) |
| 1957–1958 | Admiralteyets Leningrad | | |

International career
| 1952 | USSR | 1 | (0) |

Managerial career
- SKA LenVO Leningrad
- * Club domestic league appearances and goals

Aleksandr Aleksandrovich Tenyagin (Russian: Александр Александрович Тенягин; 16 August 1927 – 26 March 2008) was a Soviet football player and manager.

== Honours ==
- Soviet Top League bronze: 1952.

== International career ==
Tenyagin played his only game for USSR on 15 July 1952, in a 1952 Olympics game against Bulgaria.
