= Aleksei Matyunin =

Russian professional football referee (born 1982)

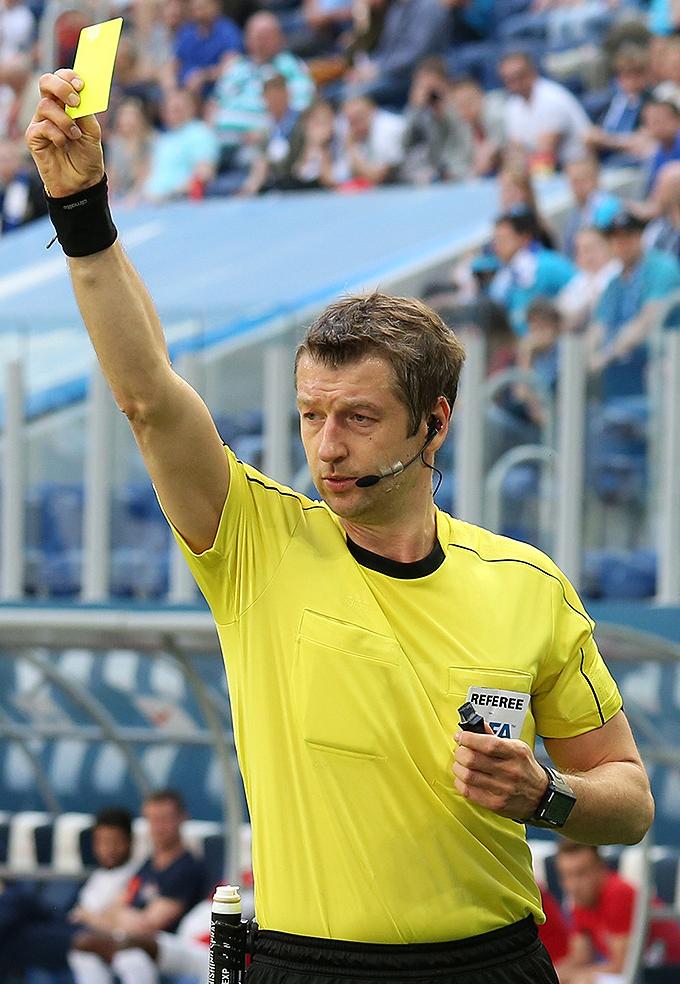
- Matyunin in 2018
- Full name: Aleksei Valeryevich Matyunin
- Born: 16 March 1982 (age 44)

Domestic
Years	League	Role
2005–2015	Russian Second League	Referee
2008–2021	Russian First League	Referee
2013–2022	Russian Premier League	Referee

International
Years	League	Role
2017–2021	FIFA	Referee

Aleksei Valeryevich Matyunin (Russian: Алексей Валерьевич Матюнин; born 16 March 1982) is a Russian former professional football referee.

He has been a FIFA referee from 2017 to 2021.

== Personal life ==
His father Valeri Matyunin was a football player and, later, referee as well.
