= Vladimir Shtapov =

Russian footballer (1946–2020)

Personal information
- Full name: Vladimir Mikhailovich Shtapov
- Date of birth: 16 April 1946
- Place of birth: Moscow, Russian SFSR
- Date of death: 20 March 2020 (aged 73)
- Height: 1.70 m (5 ft 7 in)
- Positions: Defender; midfielder

Youth career
- FC Dynamo Moscow

Senior career*
Years	Team	Apps	(Gls)
1964–1971	FC Dynamo Moscow	150	(0)
1972	FC Torpedo Moscow	4	(0)
1972–1973	FC Dynamo Bryansk		
1975–1976	FC Dynamo Vologda		

Managerial career
- 1996–1997: FC Khimki
- * Club domestic league appearances and goals

Vladimir Mikhailovich Shtapov (Russian: Владимир Михайлович Штапов; 16 April 1946 – 20 March 2020) was a Russian professional football player and coach.

== Club career ==
As a player, he made his professional debut in the Soviet Top League in 1965 for FC Dynamo Moscow.

== Honours ==
- Soviet Top League runner-up: 1967, 1970.
- Soviet Cup winner: 1967, 1970.
- European Cup Winners' Cup 1971–72 finalist (2 games).
