= Vladimir Larin =

Russian footballer

Personal information
- Full name: Vladimir Ivanovich Larin
- Date of birth: 15 May 1948
- Place of birth: Moscow, Russian SFSR
- Date of death: 18 October 1995 (aged 47)
- Place of death: Moscow, Russia
- Height: 1.84 m (6 ft 1/2 in)
- Positions: Midfielder; forward

Youth career
- FC Dynamo Moscow

Senior career*
Years	Team	Apps	(Gls)
1965–1967	FC Dynamo Moscow	0	(0)
1967	FC Lokomotiv Moscow	4	(0)
1968–1973	FC Dynamo Moscow	70	(21)
1973	FC Dynamo Vologda	10	(4)
- * Club domestic league appearances and goals

Vladimir Ivanovich Larin (Russian: Владимир Иванович Ларин; 15 May 1948 – 18 October 1995) was a Russian professional footballer.

== Club career ==
He made his professional debut in the Soviet Top League in 1967 for FC Lokomotiv Moscow.

== Honours ==
- Soviet Top League runner-up: 1970.
- Soviet Cup winner: 1970.
- European Cup Winners' Cup 1971–72 finalist (1 game).
