= Valery Korolenkov =

Soviet Russian footballer

Personal information
- Full name: Valery Ivanovich Korolenkov
- Date of birth: 17 May 1939
- Place of birth: Moscow, USSR
- Date of death: 10 December 2007 (aged 68)
- Place of death: Moscow, Russia
- Position: Midfielder

Youth career
- Moscow Ring Railroad
- FShM Moscow

Senior career*
Years	Team	Apps	(Gls)
1957	FC Lokomotiv Moscow	0	(0)
1958–1967	FC Dynamo Moscow	175	(31)
1968–1969	FC Dynamo Makhachkala		

International career
1963–1964	USSR	5	(0)

Managerial career
- 1993–2007: FC Dynamo Moscow (veterans organization)
- * Club domestic league appearances and goals

Valery Ivanovich Korolenkov (Russian: Валерий Иванович Короленков; born 17 May 1939; died 10 December 2007) was a Soviet Russian footballer.

== Honours ==
- Soviet Top League winner: 1959, 1963.

== International career ==
He earned five caps for the USSR national football team and participated in the 1964 European Nations' Cup, where the Soviets were the runners-up.
