= Andrei Dyatel =

Russian footballer

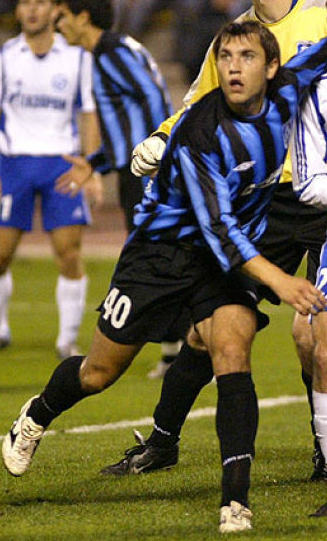

Personal information
- Full name: Andrei Vladimirovich Dyatel
- Date of birth: 8 January 1980 (age 46)
- Place of birth: Moscow, Russian SFSR
- Height: 1.78 m (5 ft 10 in)
- Position: Midfielder

Youth career
- FC Dynamo Moscow

Senior career*
Years	Team	Apps	(Gls)
1998	FC Dynamo-2 Moscow	28	(0)
1998–2000	K.R.C. Harelbeke	39	(6)
2001–2005	FC Dynamo Moscow	72	(10)
2005	FC Shinnik Yaroslavl	10	(0)
2006	FC Spartak Nizhny Novgorod	32	(0)
2007	FC Torpedo Moscow	24	(1)
2008	FC Avangard Kursk	16	(0)
2009	FC Torpedo-ZIL Moscow	21	(1)

International career
2000	Russia U-21	4	(0)
- * Club domestic league appearances and goals

Andrei Vladimirovich Dyatel (Russian: Андрей Владимирович Дятель; born 8 January 1980) is a Russian former professional football player.

== Club career ==
He made his debut in the Russian Premier League in 2001 for FC Dynamo Moscow. He played 2 games in the UEFA Cup 2001–02 for FC Dynamo Moscow.
