= Vladimir Savdunin =

Soviet footballer and bandy player

Personal information
- Full name: Vladimir Grigoryevich Savdunin
- Date of birth: 10 May 1924
- Place of birth: Moscow, Russian SFSR
- Date of death: 27 October 2008 (aged 84)
- Place of death: Moscow, Russia
- Height: 1.77 m (5 ft 9 1/2 in)
- Positions: Midfielder; striker

Youth career
- Start Moscow

Senior career*
Years	Team	Apps	(Gls)
1945–1956	FC Dynamo Moscow	189	(63)
- * Club domestic league appearances and goals

Vladimir Grigoryevich Savdunin (Russian: Владимир Григорьевич Савдунин; 10 May 1924 – 27 October 2008) was a Soviet professional football and bandy player.

== Honours ==
- Soviet Top League champion: 1945, 1949, 1954, 1955.
- Soviet Top League runner-up: 1946, 1947, 1948, 1950, 1956.
- Soviet Top League bronze: 1952.
- Soviet Cup winner: 1953.
- Soviet Bandy League champion: 1951, 1952.
