= Yuri Avrutskiy =

Soviet footballer (1944–2009)

Personal information
- Full name: Yuri Panteleyevich Avrutskiy
- Date of birth: 9 May 1944
- Place of birth: Vernoye, Amur Oblast, Russian SFSR
- Date of death: 30 January 2009 (aged 64)
- Place of death: Moscow, Moscow
- Height: 1.76 m (5 ft 9 in)
- Position: Striker

Senior career*
Years	Team	Apps	(Gls)
1962	FC Vympel Kaliningrad		
1962–1971	FC Dynamo Moscow	174	(46)
1971–1972	FC Shakhtar Donetsk	2	(0)
1972	Neftchi Baku PFC	7	(0)
- * Club domestic league appearances and goals

Yuri Panteleyevich Avrutskiy (Russian: Юрий Пантелеевич Авруцкий; 9 May 1944 – 30 January 2009) was a Soviet professional football player.

== Honours ==
- Soviet Top League champion: 1963.
- Soviet Top League runner-up: 1967, 1970.
- Soviet Cup winner: 1967, 1970.
