= Georgi Ryabov =

Russian footballer (1938–2020)

Personal information
- Full name: Georgi Ilyich Ryabov
- Date of birth: 23 August 1938
- Place of birth: Tallinn, Estonia
- Date of death: 16 June 2020 (aged 81)
- Height: 1.87 m (6 ft 2 in)
- Position: Defender

Youth career
- FC Dünamo Tallinn

Senior career*
Years	Team	Apps	(Gls)
1954–1956	FC Dünamo Tallinn		
1957	FC Dynamo Moscow	0	(0)
1957–1959	FC Dünamo Tallinn		
1960–1970	FC Dynamo Moscow	192	(2)

International career
1963–1965	USSR	5	(0)
- * Club domestic league appearances and goals

Georgi Ilyich Ryabov (Russian: Георгий Ильич Рябов; 23 August 1938 – 16 June 2020) was a Soviet football player.

== Honours ==
- Soviet Top League winner: 1963.
- Soviet Cup winner: 1967, 1970.

== International career ==
Ryabov made his debut for USSR on 22 May 1963 in a friendly against Sweden. He played in the 1966 FIFA World Cup qualifiers, but was not selected for the final tournament squad.
