= Vasili Karatayev =

Russian footballer

Personal information
- Full name: Vasili Ivanovich Karatayev
- Date of birth: 20 March 1962 (age 64)
- Place of birth: Moscow, Russian SFSR
- Height: 1.75 m (5 ft 9 in)
- Position: Midfielder

Senior career*
Years	Team	Apps	(Gls)
1981–1982	FShM Moscow	52	(2)
1983–1989	FC Dynamo Moscow	166	(14)
1990	Lokeren	0	(0)
1991–1993	RoPS	93	(19)
1994	HJK Helsinki	16	(6)
1995	Tampereen Pallo-Veikot	14	(1)
1995	IFK Mariehamn	?	(4)
1996	FC Munaishy	9	(0)
1997	RoPS	27	(0)
1998	JJK	23	(3)
1999	TP-47	16	(2)
- * Club domestic league appearances and goals

Vasili Ivanovich Karatayev (Russian: Василий Иванович Каратаев; born 20 March 1962) is a former Russian professional footballer.

== Club career ==
He made his professional debut in the Soviet Second League in 1981 for FShM Moscow.

== Personal life ==
His identical twin Mikhail Karatayev also played football professionally.

== Honours ==
- Soviet Top League runner-up: 1986.
- Soviet Cup winner: 1984.

== European club competitions ==
With FC Dynamo Moscow.

- European Cup Winners' Cup 1984–85: 8 games, 2 goals.
- UEFA Cup 1987–88: 4 games, 1 goal.
