= Viktor Vasilyev =

Russian footballer

Personal information
- Full name: Viktor Sergeyevich Vasilyev
- Date of birth: 23 July 1959 (age 67)
- Place of birth: Salavat, Russian SFSR
- Height: 1.74 m (5 ft 8 1/2 in)
- Positions: Midfielder; striker

Youth career
- Neftyanik Kuybyshev

Senior career*
Years	Team	Apps	(Gls)
1977–1980	FC Torpedo Volzhsky		
1980–1982	FC Rotor Volgograd	66	(33)
1983	PFC CSKA Moscow	5	(0)
1983–1984	FC Rotor Volgograd	73	(30)
1985–1988	FC Dynamo Moscow	85	(8)
1989	FC Dynamo Stavropol	28	(2)
1990–1991	FC Spartak Vladikavkaz	58	(7)
1992	Rovaniemen Lappi (Finland)		
1993	Kaukosen Pallo-85 (Finland)		
- * Club domestic league appearances and goals

Viktor Sergeyevich Vasilyev (Russian: Виктор Серге́евич Васильев; born 23 July 1959) is a former Russian professional footballer.

== Career ==
He made his professional debut in the Soviet Second League in 1977 for FC Torpedo Volzhsky.

=== European club competitions ===
With FC Dynamo Moscow.

- European Cup Winners' Cup 1984–85: 4 games.
- UEFA Cup 1987–88: 4 games, 1 goal.
