= Viktor Tsaryov =

Russian footballer

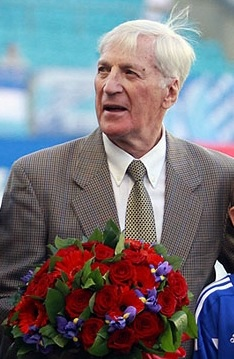
- Tsaryov in 2011

Personal information
- Full name: Viktor Grigoryevich Tsaryov
- Date of birth: 2 June 1931
- Place of birth: Moscow, USSR
- Date of death: 2 January 2017 (aged 85)
- Place of death: Moscow, Russia
- Height: 1.76 m (5 ft 9 in)
- Positions: Midfielder; defender

Youth career
- FC Dynamo Moscow

Senior career*
Years	Team	Apps	(Gls)
1952	MVO Kalinin	0	(0)
1953	MVO Moscow	0	(0)
1954–1966	Dynamo Moscow	298	(12)

International career
1958–1963	USSR	12	(0)

Managerial career
- 1967–1968: USSR (assistant)
- 1973–1975: Dynamo Moscow (assistant)
- 1976: USSR U-18
- 1979: Dynamo Moscow
- 1981: USSR U-18
Medal record
Representing Soviet Union
UEFA European Championship
Winner	1960 France
- * Club domestic league appearances and goals

Viktor Grigoryevich Tsaryov (Russian: Виктор Григорьевич Царёв; 2 June 1931 – 2 January 2017) was a Russian footballer.

== Career ==
During his career he played for FC Dynamo Moscow (1954–1966). He earned 12 caps for the USSR national football team, and participated in the 1958 FIFA World Cup, as well as the first ever European Nations' Cup in 1960, where the Soviets were champions.

After retirement, he became a football manager. By 2008, he was the chairman of the board of directors of FC Dynamo Moscow.

Tsaryov died in Moscow on 2 January 2017 at the age of 85.

== Honours ==
- Soviet Top League winner: 1955, 1957, 1959, 1963.
- Year-end Top 33 players list: 1957, 1959, 1963.
- Captained FC Dynamo Moscow in most games in franchise history (189 official league and cup games).
- Order of Friendship (1997)
- Order of Honour
