= Kirill Novikov (footballer) =

Russian footballer

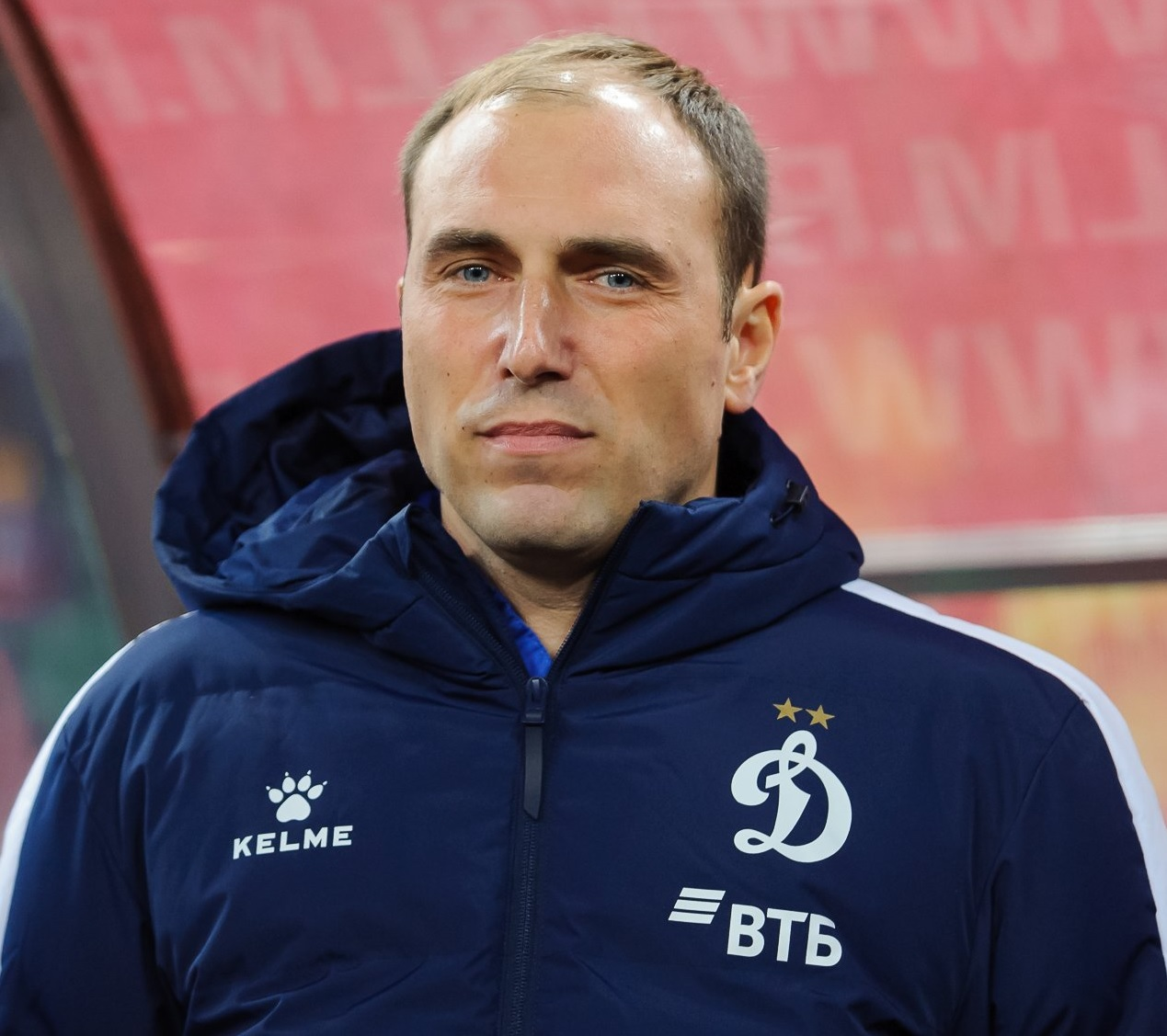
- Novikov coaching Dynamo Moscow in 2019

Personal information
- Full name: Kirill Aleksandrovich Novikov
- Date of birth: 14 January 1981 (age 45)
- Place of birth: Moscow, Russian SFSR, Soviet Union (now Moscow, Russia)
- Height: 1.82 m (6 ft 0 in)
- Position: Centre-back

Youth career
- 1997–2002: Dynamo Moscow

Senior career*
Years	Team	Apps	(Gls)
1999–2000	Dynamo-2 Moscow	38	(0)
1999–2002	Dynamo Moscow	26	(0)
2004	Red October Moscow	12	(0)
2004–2006	Istra	31	(0)
Total		107	(0)

International career
2000	Russia U21	1	(0)

Managerial career
- 2007–2016: Dynamo Moscow (youth teams)
- 2016–2017: Dynamo-2 Moscow (assistant)
- 2017–2018: Dynamo-2 St. Petersburg
- 2018–2019: Dynamo Moscow (U21 assistant)
- 2019: Dynamo Moscow (U21)
- 2019–2020: Dynamo Moscow
- 2021–2026: Neftekhimik Nizhnekamsk
Refereeing career
Domestic
Years	League	Role
2008	PFL	Assistant referee
2009–2010	PFL	Referee
- * Club domestic league appearances and goals

Kirill Aleksandrovich Novikov (Russian: Кирилл Александрович Новиков; born 14 January 1981) is a Russian professional football coach and a former player and referee.

== Playing career ==
He made his professional debut in the Russian Second Division in 1999 for Dynamo-2 Moscow. He played 3 games for Dynamo Moscow in the UEFA Cup 2001–02, including a start in an away game against Rangers.

== Coaching career ==
On 8 October 2019 he was appointed caretaker manager of Russian Premier League club Dynamo Moscow. Previous manager Dmitri Khokhlov resigned 3 days prior, with Dynamo in 15th place in the table. On 8 November 2019, he was appointed Dynamo manager on a permanent basis. In his first 6 games, Dynamo won 4 times and tied twice, going up to the 7th place in the table. On 19 December 2019, he signed a 1.5-year contract with Dynamo.

On 29 September 2020, he resigned as Dynamo manager following a series of bad results.

On 13 January 2021, he was appointed manager of the FNL club Neftekhimik Nizhnekamsk.

== Personal life ==
He is the son of Aleksandr Novikov. He had to retire from playing at a young age due to serious injuries.
