= Andrei Shevtsov =

Russian footballer

Personal information
- Full name: Andrei Vladimirovich Shevtsov
- Date of birth: 13 December 1961 (age 64)
- Place of birth: Saratov, Russian SFSR
- Height: 1.82 m (6 ft 0 in)
- Positions: Striker; midfielder

Senior career*
Years	Team	Apps	(Gls)
1977–1980	Sokol Saratov	54	(15)
1981–1984	Dynamo Moscow	54	(2)
1985	Lokomotiv Moscow	32	(3)
1986–1989	Sokol Saratov	77	(27)
1989–1990	Lokomotiv Moscow	7	(0)
1990–1991	TSF Ditzingen		
- * Club domestic league appearances and goals

Andrei Vladimirovich Shevtsov (Russian: Андрей Владимирович Шевцов; born 13 December 1961) is a Russian former professional footballer.

== Club career ==
He made his professional debut in the Soviet Second League in 1977 for FC Sokol Saratov. He played 1 game in the UEFA Cup 1982–83 for FC Dynamo Moscow.

== Honours ==
- Soviet Cup winner: 1984.
- Soviet Cup finalist: 1990.
