= Jovan Tanasijević =

Montenegrin footballer

Personal information
- Date of birth: 20 January 1978 (age 48)
- Place of birth: Pristina, SFR Yugoslavia
- Height: 1.83 m (6 ft 0 in)
- Position: Defender

Youth career
- Građanski Priština

Senior career*
Years	Team	Apps	(Gls)
1995–1997	Priština	48	(15)
1998–2002	Vojvodina	107	(4)
2003–2009	Dynamo Moscow	138	(1)
2006	→ Rostov (loan)	27	(0)
2010	Salyut Belgorod	8	(0)
2011	Inđija	5	(0)
Total		333	(21)

International career
1999–2000	FR Yugoslavia U21	5	(1)
2001	FR Yugoslavia	3	(0)
2007–2009	Montenegro	13	(0)
- * Club domestic league appearances and goals

Jovan Tanasijević (Cyrillic: Јован Танасијевић; born 20 January 1978) is a Montenegrin former professional footballer who played as a defender. He made 13 appearances for the Montenegro national team.

== Club career ==
Tanasijević made his senior debut for his hometown side Priština, before transferring to Vojvodina in the 1998 winter transfer window. He spent five years with the club, amassing over 100 appearances in the First League of FR Yugoslavia.

Between 2003 and 2009, Tanasijević played regularly for Russian club Dynamo Moscow, aside from a season-long loan to Rostov in 2006. He also briefly played for Salyut Belgorod in 2010. After a short spell with Inđija in 2011, Tanasijević decided to retire from the game.

== International career ==
Tanasijević represented FR Yugoslavia in January 2001 at the Millennium Super Soccer Cup in India. He helped the team win the tournament, making three appearances in the process.

In March 2007, Tanasijević made his full international debut for Montenegro in his country's first ever competitive match on 24 March 2007, a friendly against Hungary in Podgorica. He was capped 13 times for Montenegro. His final international was a June 2009 FIFA World Cup qualification match away against Cyprus.
