= Vadim Ivanov (footballer) =

Soviet footballer and Russian coach

Personal information
- Full name: Vadim Gennadyevich Ivanov
- Date of birth: 17 July 1943
- Place of birth: Nizhny Tagil, USSR
- Date of death: 6 November 1996 (aged 53)
- Place of death: Vologda, Russia
- Height: 1.79 m (5 ft 10 in)
- Positions: Defender; midfielder

Senior career*
Years	Team	Apps	(Gls)
1961	Lokomotiv Krasnoyarsk		
1962–1968	FC Dynamo Moscow	144	(3)
1969–1971	FC Spartak Moscow	75	(2)
1972–1973	FC Dnipro Dnipropetrovsk	42	(0)

International career
1971	USSR	1	(0)

Managerial career
- 1975–1977: FC Dnipro Dnipropetrovsk (assistant)
- 1977–1978: FC Dnipro Dnipropetrovsk
- 1979: SC Tavriya Simferopol
- 1981–1983: FC Dynamo Moscow (assistant)
- 1994: FC Dynamo Vologda
- * Club domestic league appearances and goals

Vadim Gennadyevich Ivanov (Russian: Вадим Геннадьевич Иванов; 17 July 1943 – 6 November 1996) was a Soviet football player and a Russian coach.

== Honours ==
- Soviet Top League winner: 1963, 1969.
- Soviet Cup winner: 1967, 1971.

== International career ==
Ivanov played his only game for USSR on 28 April 1971 in a friendly exhibition against Bulgaria.
