= Yevgeni Fokin =

Soviet footballer and coach (1909–1972)

Personal information
- Full name: Yevgeni Vasilyevich Fokin
- Date of birth: 12 October 1909
- Place of birth: Podolsk, Russian Empire
- Date of death: 12 November 1972 (aged 63)
- Place of death: Moscow, Soviet Union
- Height: 1.76 m (5 ft 9 in)
- Position: Goalkeeper

Youth career
- 1925–1929: im. Ilyicha Podolsk

Senior career*
Years	Team	Apps	(Gls)
1930–1944	Dynamo Moscow	65	(0)

Managerial career
- 1945–1948: Dynamo Moscow (assistant)
- 1950: Dynamo Kyiv
- 1951–1952: Dinamo Minsk
- 1954–1957: Dynamo Moscow (director)
- 1962–1963: Daugava Riga
- 1967: Lokomotiv Moscow (director)
- 1972: Motor Vladimir (director)
- * Club domestic league appearances and goals

Yevgeni Vasilyevich Fokin (Russian: Евгений Васильевич Фокин, 12 October 1909 – 12 November 1972) was a Soviet football goalkeeper and coach.

In 1925, he began his career in Podolsk and in 1930 he moved to Dinamo Moscow. In 1944, severe injury forced him to end his playing career. He defended the team colors of Moscow (1930-1934, 1939–1940) and the Russian SFSR (1932-1933).

In 1944, he began his coaching career. First, to 1948, he helped to train Dinamo Moscow. In 1950, he was appointed head coach of Dynamo Kiev and Dinamo Minsk in 1952. In 1954, he returned to Dinamo Moscow, this time as director of the club. From 1958 he was head of the youth reserve school Dinamo Moscow. From 1962 to September 1963 he managed Daugava Riga. He later worked as an officer in the Russian SFSR Sport Committee. He also held the position of director of the club Lokomotiv Moscow and Motor Vladimir. He died on November 12, 1972, in Moscow at the age of 63 years.

Fokin was champion of the USSR in 1937 and 1940, winner of the USSR Cup in 1937 and was awarded the title Honoured Master of Sports of the USSR in 1945.
