= Denis Klyuyev =

Russian footballer

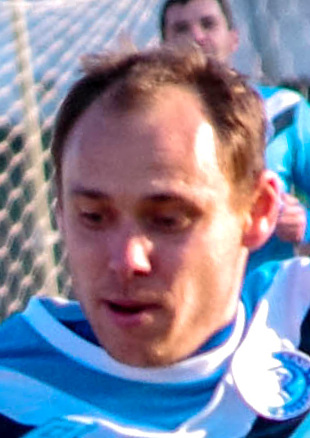

Personal information
- Full name: Denis Viktorovich Klyuyev
- Date of birth: 7 September 1973 (age 53)
- Place of birth: Moscow, Soviet Union
- Height: 1.82 m (6 ft 0 in)
- Position: Midfielder

Youth career
- Torpedo Moscow
- Krasnaya Presnya

Senior career*
Years	Team	Apps	(Gls)
1991	Krasnaya Presnya	34	(2)
1992–1993	Asmaral	51	(5)
1994	Dynamo Moscow	28	(1)
1994–1996	Feyenoord	14	(0)
1996–1997	Lierse	28	(4)
1997–1999	Schalke 04	27	(4)
1999–2001	Dynamo Moscow	69	(7)
2002–2003	Shinnik Yaroslavl	44	(2)
2004–2005	Terek Grozny	35	(1)
2006–2007	Aktobe	4	(0)
2007	Spartak-MZhK Ryazan	11	(4)
2007–2009	MVD Rossii	43	(4)
Total		388	(34)

International career
1993	Russia U-20	4	(0)
1993–1995	Russia U-21	12	(2)

Managerial career
- 2013–2017: Lokomotiv Moscow (youth team)
- 2017–2019: Lokomotiv-Kazanka
- 2020–2023: Ural-2 Yekaterinburg
- 2023: Sochi (assistant)
- 2023: Sochi (caretaker)
- 2024–2025: Volgar Astrakhan
- 2025–2026: Ural-2 Yekaterinburg
- * Club domestic league appearances and goals

Denis Viktorovich Klyuyev (Russian: Денис Викторович Клюев; born 8 September 1973) is a Russian football manager and former Soviet and Russian midfielder.

== Coaching career ==
On 3 December 2023, he was appointed caretaker manager by the Russian Premier League club PFC Sochi.

== Honours ==
- Russian Cup winner: 1995, 2004
- Belgian First Division winner: 1997
