= Vladimir Glotov =

Soviet Russian footballer

Personal information
- Full name: Vladimir Stepanovich Glotov
- Date of birth: 23 January 1937
- Place of birth: Elton, Volgograd Oblast, USSR
- Date of death: 1981 (aged 43–44)
- Height: 1.78 m (5 ft 10 in)
- Position: Defender

Senior career*
Years	Team	Apps	(Gls)
1960–1966	FC Dynamo Moscow	146	(2)

International career
1963–1964	USSR	5	(0)
Medal record
Representing Soviet Union
UEFA European Championship
Runner-up	1964 Spain
- * Club domestic league appearances and goals

Vladimir Stepanovich Glotov (Russian: Владимир Степанович Глотов; January 23, 1937 – 1981) was a Soviet Russian footballer. He was born in Elton, Volgograd Oblast.

== Honours ==
- Soviet Top League winner: 1963.

== International career ==
He earned 5 caps for the USSR national football team, and participated in the 1964 European Nations' Cup, where the Soviets were the runners-up.
