= Valter Sanaya =

Soviet footballer (1925–1999)

Personal information
- Full name: Valter Vissarionovich Sanaya
- Date of birth: 24 September 1925
- Place of birth: Ochamchire, USSR
- Date of death: 29 October 1999 (aged 74)
- Place of death: Moscow, Russia
- Height: 1.79 m (5 ft 10 in)
- Position: Goalkeeper

Senior career*
Years	Team	Apps	(Gls)
1949–1950	FC Dinamo Sukhumi		
1951	FC Dinamo Tbilisi	24	(0)
1952–1953	FC Dynamo Moscow	62	(0)
1954–1959	FC Dinamo Tbilisi	9	(0)
1960	Neftyanik Baku	28	(0)
- * Club domestic league appearances and goals

Valter Vissarionovich Sanaya (also spelled Walter Sanaya; Russian: Вальтер Виссарионович Саная; 24 September 1925 – 29 October 1999) was a Soviet football player. A native of Ochamchire, Georgia, Sanaya played as a goalkeeper.

He started his professional football career at FC Dinamo Sukhumi during the 1941 season. In 1944, he then joined FC Dinamo Tbilisi. In the 1946 season, Sanaya was hired by Dynamo Moscow, where he spent the next years. As a goalkeeper in Moscow, he was internally competing with teammates Alexei Khomich and later Lev Yashin and finally took a back seat. After a short return to Dinamo Tbilisi in 1954, he joined Neftyanik Baku. He retired in 1956.

His daughter is former figure skater Marina Sanaya, Walter Sanaya is also a distant cousin of Zurab Sanaya. He died in 1999 in Moscow.
