= Aleksandr Khapsalis =

Soviet footballer (born 1957)

Personal information
- Full name: Aleksandr Antonovich Khapsalis
- Date of birth: 17 October 1957 (age 69)
- Place of birth: Talgar, Kazakh SSR
- Height: 1.73 m (5 ft 8 in)
- Positions: Striker; midfielder

Youth career
- Talgar Football School
- Almaty Sports Internat

Senior career*
Years	Team	Apps	(Gls)
1974–1975	FC Kairat	21	(0)
1976–1982	FC Dynamo Kyiv	135	(12)
1983–1985	FC Dynamo Moscow	72	(0)
1987–1988	Kolos Nikopol	52	(6)
1989	FC Zirka Kirovohrad	49	(4)
1990–1991	FC Kirovets St. Petersburg	43	(3)
1991–1992	San Diego Sockers	12	(0)

International career
1979	Ukraine		
1979	USSR	2	(1)

Managerial career
- Los Angeles Dynamo
- Valley United Soccer Club
Medal record
Men's football
Representing Soviet Union
UEFA European U-18 Championships
Winner	1976 Hungary
UEFA European Under-21 Championship
Winner	1980 Europe
- * Club domestic league appearances and goals

Aleksandr Antonovich Khapsalis (Russian: Александр Антонович Хапсалис; born 17 October 1957) is a former Soviet football player of Pontic Greek descent. His parents were deported from Odesa Oblast.

At the end of his football playing career, Khapsalis played indoor soccer in the United States with the San Diego Sockers.

== Honours ==
- Soviet Top League winner: 1977, 1980, 1981.
- Soviet Cup winner: 1978, 1982, 1984.

== International career ==
Khapsalis made his debut for USSR in a UEFA Euro 1980 qualifier against Finland and scored on his debut. USSR did not qualify for the final tournament.

In 1979 Khapsalis played couple of games for Ukraine at the Spartakiad of the Peoples of the USSR.
