= Pascal Mendy =

Senegalese footballer

Personal information
- Date of birth: 11 January 1979 (age 47)
- Place of birth: Fass Delorme, Dakar, Senegal
- Height: 1.73 m (5 ft 8 in)
- Position: Defender

Senior career*
Years	Team	Apps	(Gls)
2000–2003	Jeanne d'Arc		
2003–2006	Dinamo Moscow	50	(1)
2007–2010	FBK Kaunas	39	(3)
2010–2011	Partizan Minsk	20	(1)
2011	→ Dinamo Brest (loan)	31	(1)
2012–2013	Torpedo-BelAZ Zhodino	41	(1)
2014	Mbour Petite Côte		

International career
2006–2008	Senegal	10	(0)
- * Club domestic league appearances and goals

Pascal Mendy (born 11 January 1979) is a Senegalese former footballer.

== Career ==
A former Dynamo Moscow player, Mendy signed for Kaunas in February 2007. After Kaunas was demoted from A Lyga, Mendy joined the Belarusian Premier League side Partizan Minsk, another club owned by Romanov.
