= Vladimir Shabrov =

Soviet footballer

Personal information
- Full name: Vladimir Sergeyevich Shabrov
- Date of birth: 15 March 1930
- Place of birth: Moscow, USSR
- Date of death: 12 May 1990 (aged 60)
- Place of death: Moscow, USSR
- Height: 1.73 m (5 ft 8 in)
- Position: Striker

Youth career
- CDKA Moscow

Senior career*
| Years | Team | Apps | (Gls) |
| 1948–1949 | Krylia Sovetov Tushino | | |
| 1950–1959 | FC Dynamo Moscow | 98 | (16) |

International career
| 1955 | USSR | 2 | (2) |
- * Club domestic league appearances and goals

Vladimir Sergeyevich Shabrov (Russian: Владимир Серге́евич Шабров; born 15 March 1930; died 12 May 1990) was a Soviet football player. From 1961 until his death he worked as a diplomatic courier.

== Honours ==
- Soviet Top League winner: 1954, 1955, 1957, 1959.
- Soviet Cup winner: 1953.

== International career ==
Shabrov made his debut for USSR on 16 August 1955 in a friendly against India, scoring two goals on his debut.

== Career statistics ==
=== International goals ===
| # | Date | Venue | Opponent | Score | Result | Competition |
|---|---|---|---|---|---|---|
| 1. | 16 September 1955 | Dynamo Stadium, Moscow, Soviet Union | India | 11–1 | Win | Friendly |
| 2. | 16 September 1955 | Dynamo Stadium, Moscow, Soviet Union | India | 11–1 | Win | Friendly |
Correct as of 7 March 2016
