= Sergei Yashin (footballer) =

Russian footballer

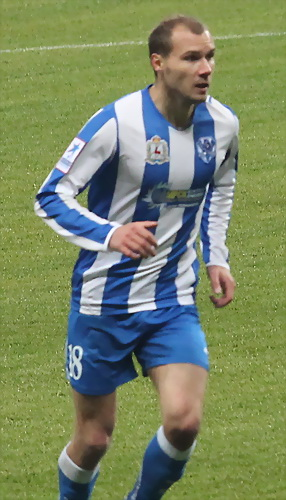

Personal information
- Full name: Sergei Sergeyevich Yashin
- Date of birth: 3 January 1981 (age 45)
- Place of birth: Kaluga, USSR
- Height: 1.78 m (5 ft 10 in)
- Position: Midfielder

Youth career
- FC Torpedo Kaluga
- Sharikopodshipnik Moscow

Senior career*
Years	Team	Apps	(Gls)
1999–2000	FC Dynamo-2 Moscow	57	(1)
2001–2006	FC Dynamo Moscow	67	(5)
2006–2007	FC Saturn Moscow Oblast	20	(0)
2008–2009	FC Shinnik Yaroslavl	41	(4)
2010–2012	FC Volga Nizhny Novgorod	30	(1)
2012–2013	FC Daugava	13	(5)
2014–2015	FC Dolgoprudny	25	(4)
2015	FC Domodedovo Moscow	16	(2)
- * Club domestic league appearances and goals

Sergei Sergeyevich Yashin (Russian: Серге́й Серге́евич Яшин; born 3 January 1981) is a former Russian footballer.

== Career ==
Sports School alumnus Zarya and CYSS Torpedo (Kaluga). First coach Mikhail Ivanovich Strykov.

Yashin professional football career began at the Moscow Dynamo. The first 3 years he played for the reserves. Since 2001 began to play for the first team. Debuted June 24, 2001, in a match of the 14th round of the championship of Russia against the Voronezh Fakel. June 28, 2006 joined the Moscow region Saturn. Since 2008, played in Shinnik. In 2010, he moved to Nizhny Novgorod Volga. In 2012, he signed a contract with Daugava Daugavpils, which became the first foreign club in his career. In 2013, he was released.

From August 2014, he is a player of FC Dolgoprudny. Since 2015 of FC Domodedovo.

== Personal life ==
- He is married and has a daughter, Mila.
- Idols in football — Zinedine Zidane and Lionel Messi.

== Honours ==
Daugava Daugavpils

- Latvian Higher League (1): 2012
