= Aleksandr Novikov (footballer, born 1955) =

Russian footballer

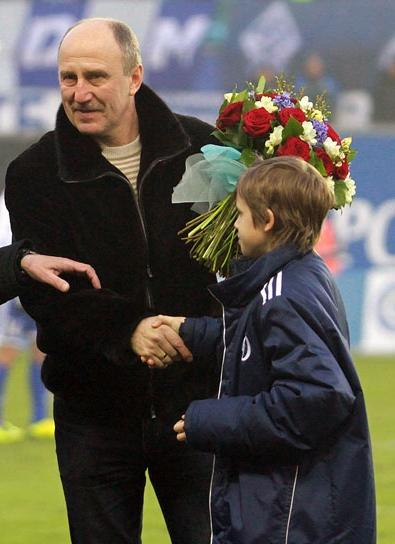

Personal information
- Full name: Aleksandr Vasilyevich Novikov
- Date of birth: 14 June 1955 (age 71)
- Place of birth: Moscow, Russian SFSR
- Height: 1.80 m (5 ft 11 in)
- Position: Defender

Team information
- Current team: FC Dynamo Moscow (academy coach)

Youth career
- FC Dynamo Moscow

Senior career*
Years	Team	Apps	(Gls)
1975–1987	FC Dynamo Moscow	327	(8)
1988–1989	FC Dynamo Stavropol	82	(2)
1990–1991	FC Spartak Vladikavkaz	67	(2)
1994	FC Tekhinvest-M Moscow	3	(0)

International career
1977	USSR	3	(0)

Managerial career
- 1992–1993: FC Spartak Vladikavkaz
- 1994: FC Tekhinvest-M Moscow
- 1996–1998: FC Dynamo Moscow (assistant)
- 1999: FC Serpukhov
- 1999–2001: FC Dynamo Moscow (assistant)
- 2001: FC Dynamo Moscow (reserves)
- 2001–2002: FC Dynamo Moscow
- 2005–2006: FC Lokomotiv Moscow (assistant)
- 2007–2015: FC Dynamo Moscow (youth teams)
- 2015–2018: FC Dynamo St. Petersburg (assistant)
- 2018–2020: PFC Sochi (assistant)
- 2020: FC Dynamo Moscow (assistant)
- 2021–: FC Dynamo Moscow (academy)
- * Club domestic league appearances and goals

Aleksandr Vasilyevich Novikov (Russian: Александр Васильевич Новиков; born 14 June 1955) is a Russian football coach and a former Soviet and Russian player. He works at the academy of FC Dynamo Moscow.

== Honours ==
- Soviet Top League winner: 1976 (spring).
- Soviet Top League runner-up: 1986.
- Soviet Cup winner: 1977, 1984.
- Russian Premier League runner-up (as a manager): 1992.
- All-time most league appearances for FC Dynamo Moscow: 395.

== International career ==
Novikov made his debut for USSR on 20 March 1977 in a friendly against Tunisia. He played in a 1978 FIFA World Cup qualifier.

== Personal life ==
His son Kirill Novikov played football professionally as well, and then became a coach. In 2019, Kirill was appointed manager of FC Dynamo Moscow, with Aleksandr working as his assistant.
