= Yuri Pudyshev =

Soviet footballer (1954–2021)

Personal information
- Full name: Yuri Alekseyevich Pudyshev
- Date of birth: 3 April 1954
- Place of birth: Kaliningrad, Moscow Oblast, Russian SFSR, Soviet Union
- Date of death: 29 August 2021 (aged 67)
- Height: 1.77 m (5 ft 10 in)
- Position: Midfielder

Youth career
- 1971–1972: Dinamo Moscow

Senior career*
Years	Team	Apps	(Gls)
1973–1975	Dinamo Moscow	37	(3)
1976–1984	Dinamo Minsk	262	(24)
1984–1986	Dinamo Moscow	47	(4)
1986–1988	Dinamo Stavropol	75	(5)
1988	Dinamo Barnaul	9	(0)
1989	Dinamo Samarqand	32	(1)
1990–1993	Dynamo Yakutsk	82	(4)
1994	Samotlor-XXI Nizhnevartovsk	12	(0)
2007–2008	MTZ-RIPO Minsk	0	(0)
2010	Dinamo Brest	1	(0)
Total		557	(41)

International career
1984	Soviet Union	1	(0)
1984	Soviet Union Olympic	1	(0)

Managerial career
- 1992: Dynamo Yakutsk (assistant)
- 1997–2003: BATE Borisov (assistant)
- 1999–2000: Belarus (assistant)
- 2004–2006: MTZ-RIPO Minsk (assistant)
- 2005–2006: Belarus U21 (assistant)
- 2006–2007: Belarus (assistant)
- 2007–2009: MTZ-RIPO Minsk (assistant)
- 2009–2011: Dinamo Brest (assistant)
- 2011–2021: BATE Borisov (assistant/youth)
- * Club domestic league appearances and goals

Yuri Alekseyevich Pudyshev (Russian: Юрий Алексеевич Пудышев; 3 April 1954 – 29 August 2021) was a Soviet and Belarusian football player and coach.

== Coaching career ==
From 1997, Pudyshev worked closely with Yuri Puntus, following him to several teams as an assistant coach. He continued active lifestyle and in 2000s he briefly resumed his playing career twice, coming as substitute player in a cup game for MTZ-RIPO Minsk in 2007 and 2008 and again in a league game for Dinamo Brest in 2010, setting a record for oldest player in both competitions.

== International career ==
Pudyshev played his only game for USSR on 28 March 1984 in a friendly against West Germany.

== Honours ==
- Soviet Top League: 1982
