= Yuri Vshivtsev =

Russian footballer

Personal information
- Full name: Yuri Mikhailovich Vshivtsev
- Date of birth: 11 January 1940
- Place of birth: Kirov, Russian SFSR
- Date of death: 26 April 2010 (aged 70)
- Height: 1.71 m (5 ft 7 1/2 in)
- Position: Forward

Senior career*
Years	Team	Apps	(Gls)
1961	FC Dynamo Kirov		
1962–1968	FC Dynamo Moscow	188	(53)
1969	PFC CSKA Moscow	14	(1)
1970–1972	FC Dynamo Barnaul	105	(20)
1973	FC Dynamo Vologda		
- * Club domestic league appearances and goals

Yuri Mikhailovich Vshivtsev (Russian: Юрий Михайлович Вшивцев; 11 January 1940 – 26 April 2010) was a Russian professional football player.

== Career ==
Vshivtsev began playing football with local side FC Dynamo Kirov. In the 1960s, he played forward for FC Dynamo Moscow, helping the club win the Soviet Cup and the Soviet Top League, plus two runner's-up finishes. Overall he scored 78 goals in 245 league matches.

== Honours ==
- Soviet Top League champion: 1963.
- Soviet Top League runner-up: 1962, 1967.
- Soviet Cup winner: 1967.
