= Oleh Kramarenko (footballer, born 1956) =

Ukrainian footballer and manager

Personal information
- Full name: Oleh Ivanovych Kramarenko
- Date of birth: 6 January 1956 (age 70)
- Place of birth: Kharkiv, Ukrainian SSR
- Height: 1.75 m (5 ft 9 in)
- Positions: Midfielder; striker

Senior career*
Years	Team	Apps	(Gls)
1974–1975	FC Metalist Kharkiv	68	(12)
1976–1977	FC Dynamo Moscow	38	(5)
1978–1981	FC Dnipro Dnipropetrovsk	130	(20)
1982–1985	FC Metalist Kharkiv	90	(5)
1986	FC Naftovyk Okhtyrka	33	(9)

Managerial career
- FC Metalist-2 Kharkiv (ass't)
- 2007–2008: FC Hazovyk-KhGV Kharkiv
- FC Metalist Kharkiv (youth team)
- * Club domestic league appearances and goals

Oleh Kramarenko (Ukrainian: Олег Іванович Крамаренко; born 6 January 1956) is a former Ukrainian professional footballer.

== Club career ==
He made his professional debut in the Soviet Second League in 1974 for FC Metalist Kharkiv.

== European club competitions ==
With FC Dynamo Moscow.

- UEFA Cup 1976–77: 1 game.
- European Cup Winners' Cup 1977–78: 1 game.
