= Konstantin Krizhevsky =

Russian footballer

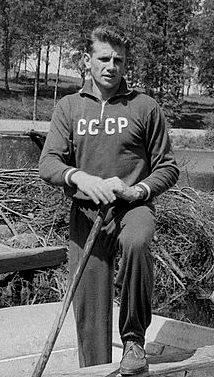
- Krizhevsky at the 1958 World Cup

Personal information
- Full name: Konstantin Stanislavovich Krizhevsky
- Date of birth: 20 February 1926
- Place of birth: Odintsovo, USSR
- Date of death: 18 November 2000 (aged 74)
- Place of death: Moscow, Russia
- Height: 1.78 m (5 ft 10 in)
- Position: Defender

Youth career
- Remeslennoye Uchilishche Moscow
- Plant Kuibyshev

Senior career*
Years	Team	Apps	(Gls)
1946–1947	Krylia Sovetov Kuibyshev	20	(0)
1948–1952	VVS Moscow	113	(0)
1953–1961	FC Dynamo Moscow	141	(0)
Total		274	(0)

International career
1952–1958	USSR	14	(0)

Managerial career
- FC Dynamo Moscow (assistant)
- * Club domestic league appearances and goals

Konstantin Stanislavovich Krizhevsky (Russian: Константин Станиславович Крижевский; 20 February 1926 – 18 November 2000) was a Soviet football defender. He was born in Odintsovo, Russia. He competed for the Soviet Union at the 1952 Olympics, and the 1958 FIFA World Cup.

== Honours ==
- Soviet Top League winner: 1954, 1955, 1957, 1959.
- Soviet Cup winner: 1953.
