= Vladimir Ryzhkin =

Soviet footballer

Personal information
- Full name: Vladimir Alekseyevich Ryzhkin
- Date of birth: 29 December 1930
- Place of birth: Moscow, USSR
- Date of death: 19 May 2011 (aged 80)
- Place of death: Moscow, Russia
- Height: 1.73 m (5 ft 8 in)
- Position: Striker

Senior career*
Years	Team	Apps	(Gls)
1950–1951	ODO Minsk		
1952	CDSA Moscow	0	(0)
1953	MVO Moscow	4	(0)
1953–1961	FC Dynamo Moscow	119	(21)
1962	FK Daugava Rīga	29	(4)

International career
1956–1957	USSR	5	(0)
- * Club domestic league appearances and goals

Olympic medal record

Representing Soviet Union

Men's Football
Gold medal – first place	1956 Melbourne	Team competition

Vladimir Alekseyevich Ryzhkin (Russian: Владимир Алексеевич Рыжкин; 29 December 1930 – 19 May 2011) was a Soviet football player.

== Honours ==
- Olympic champion: 1956.
- Soviet Top League winner: 1954, 1955, 1957.
- Soviet Cup winner: 1953.

== International career ==
Ryzhkin made his debut for USSR on 21 October 1956 in a friendly against France.
