= Vladimir Pilguy =

Soviet footballer

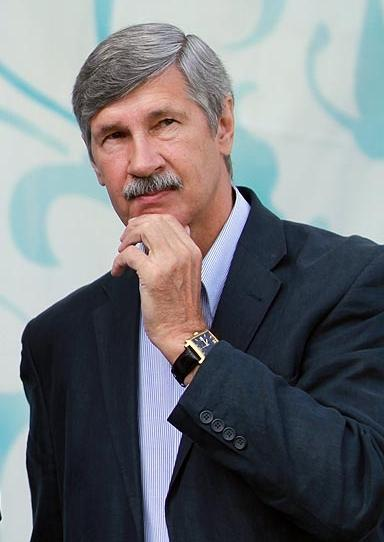

Personal information
- Full name: Vladimir Mikhailovich Pilguy
- Date of birth: 26 January 1948 (age 78)
- Place of birth: Dnipropetrovsk, USSR
- Height: 1.85 m (6 ft 1 in)
- Position: Goalkeeper

Youth career
- 1958–1961: Stroitel Dnipropetrovsk
- 1961–1968: FC Dnipro Dnipropetrovsk

Senior career*
Years	Team	Apps	(Gls)
1969	FC Dnipro Dnipropetrovsk	41	(0)
1970–1981	FC Dynamo Moscow	223	(0)
1982–1983	FC Kuban Krasnodar	55	(0)
Total		319	(0)

International career
1972–1977	USSR	12	(0)

Managerial career
- 1987–1989: USSR Football Veterans (president)
- 1989–1990: FC Dynamo Moscow (president)
- 1992: Professional Football League of Russia (director)
- 1996–1997: FC Torpedo-Luzhniki Moscow (director)
- 2003–2005: Russia U-19 (goalkeeping coach)
- 2007–2010: FC Saturn Moscow Oblast (sports director)
- 2011–2012: FC Torpedo Moscow (assistant)
Medal record
Representing Soviet Union
Men's Football at the Summer Olympics
Bronze medal – third place	1972 Munich	Team
Bronze medal – third place	1980 Moscow	Team
UEFA European Championship
Runner-up	1972 Belgium
- * Club domestic league appearances and goals

Vladimir Mikhailovich Pilguy (Russian: Владимир Михайлович Пильгуй, Ukrainian: Володимир Михайлович Пільгуй; born 26 January 1948) is a former Russian and Soviet footballer from Ukraine.

== Honours ==
- Soviet Top League runner-up: 1970.
- Soviet Top League bronze: 1973, 1975.
- Soviet Cup winner: 1970, 1977.
- UEFA Cup Winners' Cup finalist: 1972.
- UEFA Euro 1972 runner-up: 1972.
- Olympic bronze: 1972, 1980.
- Soviet Goalkeeper of the Year: 1973.
- Top 33 players year-end list: 1971, 1972, 1973, 1974, 1977.
- Soviet Footballer of the Year third place: 1973.
- Lev Yashin Club member.

== International career ==
He earned 12 caps for the USSR national football team, and participated in UEFA Euro 1972, and won two Olympic bronze medals.
