= Valeri Matyunin =

Russian footballer

Personal information
- Full name: Valeri Mikhailovich Matyunin
- Date of birth: 20 July 1960
- Place of birth: Moscow, Russian SFSR
- Date of death: 9 January 2018 (aged 57)
- Height: 1.85 m (6 ft 1 in)
- Positions: Striker; midfielder

Senior career*
Years	Team	Apps	(Gls)
1978–1986	Dynamo Moscow	110	(12)
1986–1987	Fakel Voronezh	54	(10)
1988	Arsenal Tula	35	(26)
1989	Spartak Kostroma	12	(10)
1989–1990	Dnepr Mogilev	63	(17)
1991	Tiligul Tiraspol	14	(0)
1991	APK Azov	2	(0)
1992–1993	Kuzbass Kemerovo	51	(13)
1994	Gigant Voskresensk	18	(9)
1995	Industriya Obninsk	17	(0)
- * Club domestic league appearances and goals

Valeri Mikhailovich Matyunin (Russian: Валерий Михайлович Матюнин; 20 July 1960 – 9 January 2018) was a Russian professional footballer.

== Club career ==
He made his professional debut in the Soviet Top League in 1979 for FC Dynamo Moscow. After winning the 1984 Soviet Cup with Dynamo, Matyunin had spells with FC Fakel Voronezh, FC Arsenal Tula, FC Spartak Kostroma, FC Dnepr Mogilev, FC Tiligul Tiraspol, FC Kuzbass Kemerovo, FC Gigant Voskresensk and FC Industriya Obninsk.

== Honours ==
- Soviet Cup winner: 1984.
- Soviet Top League runner-up: 1986.

== European club competitions ==
With FC Dynamo Moscow.

- UEFA Cup 1980–81: 2 games.
- UEFA Cup 1982–83: 1 game.
- European Cup Winners' Cup 1984–85: 3 games.

== Referee career ==
After his retirement as a player, he worked as a referee from 1997 to 2005. The highest level he refereed in was the second-tier Russian Football National League.

== Personal life ==
His son Aleksei Matyunin is a FIFA referee.
