= Valeri Urin =

Soviet footballer and coach (1934–2023)

Personal information
- Full name: Valeri Grigoryevich Urin
- Date of birth: 10 August 1934
- Place of birth: Sverdlovsk, Russian SFSR, USSR
- Date of death: 23 January 2023 (aged 88)
- Height: 1.74 m (5 ft 9 in)
- Position: Striker

Senior career*
Years	Team	Apps	(Gls)
1949–1953	Pishchevik Kirov		
1953–1955	Dynamo Kirov		
1955–1961	Dynamo Moscow	68	(19)
1962	Belarus Minsk	3	(0)
1963	Daugava Rīga	28	(12)
1964	FC Metalurh Zaporizhya	6	(0)
1965–1968	Neftekhimik Salavat		

International career
1958–1959	USSR	2	(0)

Managerial career
- 1968: Neftekhimik Salavat (assistant)
- 1969: Torpedo Podolsk
- 1970: Dynamo Makhachkala
- 1971–1972: Avtomobilist Krasnoyarsk (director)
- 1972–1973: Avtomobilist Krasnoyarsk
- * Club domestic league appearances and goals

Valeri Grigoryevich Urin (Russian: Валерий Григорьевич Урин; 10 August 1934 – 23 January 2023) was a Soviet football player and coach.

== International career ==
Urin made his debut for USSR on 30 August 1958 in a friendly against Czechoslovakia.

== Personal life and death ==
Urin was of Jewish ethnicity. He died on 23 January 2023, at the age of 88.

== Honours ==
Dynamo Moscow

- Soviet Top League: 1957, 1959
