= Mikhail Gershkovich =

Soviet footballer (born 1948)

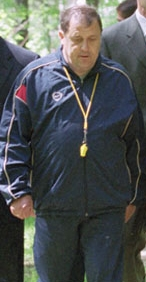

Personal information
- Full name: Mikhail Danilovich Gershkovich
- Date of birth: 1 April 1948 (age 78)
- Place of birth: Moscow, Russian SFSR, Soviet Union
- Position: Striker

Youth career
- Yunye Pionery Moscow
- FShM Moscow

Senior career*
Years	Team	Apps	(Gls)
1966	FC Lokomotiv Moscow	28	(6)
1967–1971	FC Torpedo Moscow	126	(29)
1972–1979	FC Dynamo Moscow	146	(21)
1979	FC Lokomotiv Moscow	8	(2)

International career
1968–1971	USSR	10	(3)

Managerial career
- 1985–1987: FC Dynamo Moscow (assistant)
- 1993–1994: Russia Olympic (director)
- 1994–1998: Russia U-21
- 1999–2002: Russia (assistant)
- * Club domestic league appearances and goals

Mikhail Danilovich Gershkovich (Russian: Михаил Данилович Гершкович; born 1 April 1948) is a retired Soviet football player and a current Russian coach of Jewish ethnicity.

== International career ==
Gershkovich played on the USSR national football team. He made his debut on the team on 16 June 1968 in a friendly against Austria and scored on his debut. He scored a goal in each of his three first games for USSR. He played in the 1970 FIFA World Cup qualifiers, but was not selected for the final tournament squad.

He was also a football coach. He was also President of the Russian Association of Football Coaches.

== Honours ==
- Soviet Top League winner: 1976 (spring)
- Soviet Cup winner: 1968, 1977
- European U-19 Championship winner: 1966

== See also ==
- List of select Jewish football (association; soccer) players
