= Vladimir Ilyin (footballer, born 1928) =

Soviet footballer and coach

Personal information
- Full name: Vladimir Vasilyevich Ilyin
- Date of birth: 15 January 1928
- Place of birth: Kolomna, Russian SFSR
- Date of death: 17 July 2009 (aged 81)
- Place of death: Moscow, Russia
- Height: 1.73 m (5 ft 8 in)
- Position: Striker

Senior career*
Years	Team	Apps	(Gls)
1945	FC Lokomotiv Kharkov	5	(2)
1946–1957	FC Dynamo Moscow	157	(63)
1958–1960	FC Dynamo Kirov	75	(26)

Managerial career
- 1966–1971: FC Dynamo Moscow (assistant)
- 1975–1976: FC Dynamo Moscow (assistant)
- * Club domestic league appearances and goals

Vladimir Vasilyevich Ilyin (Russian: Владимир Васильевич Ильин; born 15 January 1928, in Kolomna – 17 July 2009, in Moscow) was a Soviet professional football player.

He was the first coach of Andrey Kobelev.

== Honours ==
- Soviet Top League champion: 1949, 1954, 1955, 1957.
- Soviet Top League runner-up: 1946, 1947, 1950, 1956.
- Soviet Top League bronze: 1952.
- Soviet Top League top scorer: 1954 (11 goals).
- Soviet Cup winner: 1953.
- Soviet Cup finalist: 1949, 1950.
