= Andrei Yakubik =

Soviet footballer

Personal information
- Full name: Andrei Aleksandrovich Yakubik
- Date of birth: 24 August 1950 (age 76)
- Place of birth: Moscow, USSR
- Height: 1.79 m (5 ft 10 in)
- Positions: Midfielder; striker

Youth career
- Metrostroy Moscow
- FC Dynamo Moscow

Senior career*
Years	Team	Apps	(Gls)
1967–1979	FC Dynamo Moscow	158	(33)
1979	FC Pakhtakor Tashkent	12	(4)
1980	FC Dynamo Moscow	12	(2)
1980–1984	FC Pakhtakor Tashkent	105	(58)
1985	Krasnaya Presnya Moscow		

International career
1972	USSR	2	(0)

Managerial career
- 1987: FC Dynamo Moscow (youth teams)
- 1988–1989: Krasnaya Presnya Moscow
- * Club domestic league appearances and goals

Olympic medal record

Men's Football
Bronze medal – third place	1972 Munich	Team competition

Andrei Aleksandrovich Yakubik (Russian: Андрей Александрович Якубик; born 24 August 1950) is a former Soviet football player.

== Honours ==
- Soviet Top League winner: 1976 (spring).
- Soviet Cup winner: 1977.
- Olympic bronze: 1972.
- UEFA Cup Winners' Cup finalist: 1972.
- Grigory Fedotov Club member.
- Top 33 players year-end list: 1982.

== International career ==
Yakubik made his debut for USSR on 1 September 1972 in the 1972 Summer Olympics game against Mexico.
