= Aleksandr Bubnov =

Russian footballer

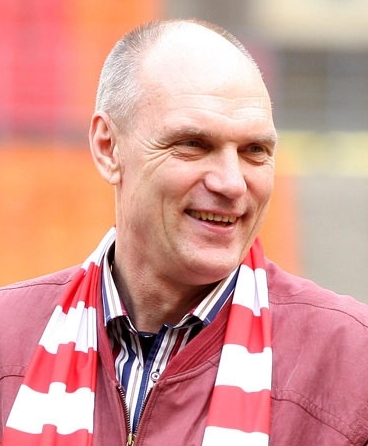
- Bubnov in 2012

Personal information
- Full name: Aleksandr Viktorovich Bubnov
- Date of birth: 10 October 1955 (age 71)
- Place of birth: Lyubertsy, USSR
- Height: 1.89 m (6 ft 2 in)
- Position: Defender

Youth career
- 1972: SKA Rostov

Senior career*
Years	Team	Apps	(Gls)
1973–1974	Spartak Ordzhonikidze	23	(1)
1974–1982	Dynamo Moscow	206	(7)
1983–1989	Spartak Moscow	169	(3)
1989–1990	Red Star	27	(1)
1998	Slavia Mozyr	0	(0)
Total		425	(12)

International career
1977–1987	USSR	34	(1)

Managerial career
- 1991–1993: Red Star Saint-Ouen (assistant)
- 1995: Dinamo-Gazovik Tyumen
- 1997–1998: Slavia Mozyr
- 2002: Fabus Bronnitsy
- * Club domestic league appearances and goals

Aleksandr Viktorovich Bubnov (Russian: Александр Викторович Бубнов; born 10 October 1955, in Lyubertsy) is a Russian former professional footballer and a coach. After a short career as a coach, he has since become a radio, television and internet pundit.

== Club career ==
Bubnov began his professional career at Spartak Ordzhonikidze in 1973, playing 23 matches and scoring 1 goal. He moved to Dynamo Moscow in 1974, where he made 206 appearances and scored 7 goals. From 1983 to 1989, he played for Spartak Moscow, making 169 appearances and scoring 3 goals. He then played in France for Red Star in 1989–1990, with 27 appearances and 1 goal. In 1998, he briefly joined Slavia Mozyr but did not play official matches.

== International career ==
Bubnov earned 34 caps and scored 1 goal for the USSR national team and participated in the 1986 FIFA World Cup finals.

== Media career ==
After retiring, Bubnov became a football analyst for the Russian sports portal Sportbox.ru, hosting the "Bubnov's Expertise" section and providing in-depth tactical analysis. In 2025, Bubnov became a regular participant in the YouTube program "Comment.Show".

== Honours ==
- Soviet Top League: 1976 (spring), 1987, 1989
- Soviet Cup: 1977
- UEFA Under-23: 1976
