= Aleksandr Minayev (footballer, born 1954) =

Russian footballer

Personal information
- Full name: Aleksandr Alekseyevich Minayev
- Date of birth: 11 August 1954
- Place of birth: Zheleznodorozhny, Russian SFSR
- Date of death: 6 December 2018 (aged 64)
- Place of death: Moscow, Russia
- Height: 1.75 m (5 ft 9 in)
- Position: Midfielder

Youth career
- FC Spartak Moscow

Senior career*
Years	Team	Apps	(Gls)
1972–1975	FC Spartak Moscow	92	(10)
1976–1984	FC Dynamo Moscow	209	(21)
Total		301	(31)

International career
1976–1979	USSR	22	(4)

Managerial career
- 1985–1995: FC Dynamo Moscow (youth teams)
- 1996–1997: FC Dynamo-2 Moscow (assistant)
- 1998: FC Serpukhov (assistant)
- 2000: FC Stolitsa Moscow
- * Club domestic league appearances and goals

Olympic medal record

Representing the Soviet Union

Men's football
Bronze medal – third place	1976 Montreal	Team

Aleksandr Alekseyevich Minayev (Russian: Александр Алексеевич Минаев; 11 August 1954 – 6 December 2018) was a Russian football player and coach.

== Honours ==
- Soviet Top League winner: 1976 (spring).
- Soviet Cup winner: 1977.
- Olympic bronze: 1976.
- European Under-23 Championship winner: 1976.

== International career ==
Minayev made his debut for USSR on 20 March 1976 in a friendly match against Argentina. He played in the quarterfinals of the UEFA Euro 1976 and participated in the qualifiers for the 1978 FIFA World Cup; however, the USSR did not qualify for the final tournament in either competition.

== Personal life ==
In the first half of the 1980s, he was in a long-term relationship with actress Natalya Gundareva.
