= Sergei Nikulin =

Soviet footballer and Russian coach (born 1951)

Personal information
- Full name: Sergei Nikolayevich Nikulin
- Date of birth: 1 January 1951 (age 75)
- Place of birth: Stalinabad, Tajik SSR
- Height: 1.73 m (5 ft 8 in)
- Position: Defender

Youth career
- FC Dynamo Moscow

Senior career*
Years	Team	Apps	(Gls)
1969–1984	FC Dynamo Moscow	280	(1)
1984–1985	FC Dynamo Kashira	23	(0)

International career
1974–1979	USSR	3	(0)

Managerial career
- 1986–1988: FC Dynamo Moscow (youth teams)
- 1988–1990: FC Dynamo-2 Moscow (director)
- 1990–2004: FC Dynamo Moscow (director)
- 2004: FC Dynamo Moscow (assistant)
- * Club domestic league appearances and goals

Olympic medal record

Representing Soviet Union

Men's Football
Bronze medal – third place	1980 Moscow	Team competition

Sergei Nikolayevich Nikulin (Russian: Серге́й Николаевич Никулин; born 1 January 1951) is a former Soviet football player and a current Russian coach.

== Honours ==
- Soviet Top League winner: 1976 (spring).
- Soviet Cup winner: 1977, 1984.
- Olympic bronze: 1980.

== International career ==
Nikulin made his debut for USSR on 30 October 1974 in a UEFA Euro 1976 qualifier against Ireland. He did not play for the national team again until 1979, when he played in a UEFA Euro 1980 qualifier.
