= Anatoliy Shepel =

Ukrainian footballer

Personal information
- Full name: Anatoliy Mykolayovich Shepel
- Date of birth: 12 November 1949 (age 77)
- Place of birth: Kyiv, Ukrainian SSR
- Height: 1.74 m (5 ft 9 in)
- Position: Striker

Senior career*
Years	Team	Apps	(Gls)
1968–1970	Avtomobilist Zhytomyr	19	(0)
1971–1973	FC Chornomorets Odessa	111	(68)
1974	FC Dynamo Kyiv	20	(1)
1975–1976	FC Dynamo Moscow	39	(14)
1978–1979	FC Chornomorets Odessa	39	(8)

International career
1974	Soviet Union	1	(0)

Managerial career
- 1980–1981: Stroitel Pripyat
- * Club domestic league appearances and goals

Anatoliy Mykolayovych Shepel (Ukrainian: Анатолій Миколайович Шепель, Russian: Анатолий Николаевич Шепель; born on 12 November 1949) is a former Ukrainian football player.

== Honours ==
- Soviet Top League winner: 1974, 1976 (spring)
- Soviet Cup winner: 1974.

== International career ==
Shepel played his only game for the USSR on 20 May 1974 in a friendly against Czechoslovakia.

== State awards ==
- Order of Merit (Ukraine) 3rd degree (2015)
- Order of Merit (Ukraine) 2nd degree (2020)
