= Oleg Dolmatov =

Russian football manager and former player

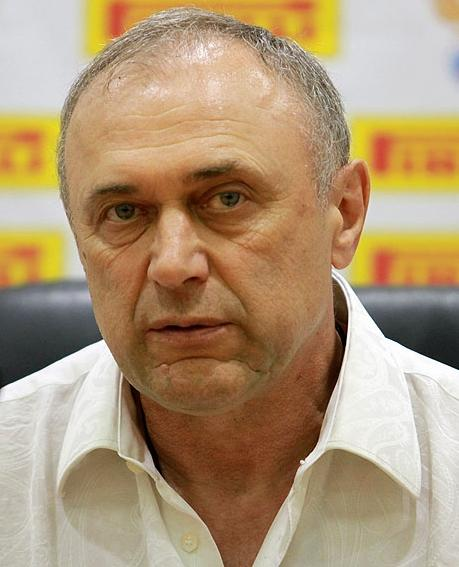

Personal information
- Full name: Oleg Vasilyevich Dolmatov
- Date of birth: 29 November 1948 (age 77)
- Place of birth: Chelyabinsk-40, USSR
- Height: 1.81 m (5 ft 11 in)
- Position: Midfielder

Team information
- Current team: PFC CSKA Moscow (academy coach)

Youth career
- 1962–1966: FC Lokomotiv Krasnoyarsk

Senior career*
| Years | Team | Apps | (Gls) |
| 1966 | FC Lokomotiv Krasnoyarsk | | |
| 1967–1971 | FC Kairat | 126 | (17) |
| 1972–1979 | FC Dynamo Moscow | 154 | (8) |

International career
| 1971–1977 | USSR | 14 | (0) |

Managerial career
- 1982–1986: FC Dynamo Stavropol
- 1987–1988: FC Dynamo-2 Moscow
- 1990–1991: FC Dinamo Sokhumi
- 1992–1995: FC Chernomorets Novorossiysk
- 1996–1998: FC Chernomorets Novorossiysk
- 1998–2000: PFC CSKA Moscow
- 2001–2002: FC Kuban Krasnodar
- 2003: FC Dynamo St. Petersburg
- 2003: Vorskla-Naftohaz Poltava
- 2004–2006: FC Shinnik Yaroslavl
- 2006: FC Lokomotiv Moscow
- 2007–2009: FC Rostov
- 2010: FC Dinamo Sokhumi
- 2011–2012: FC Khimki
- 2012–2015: FC Chernomorets Novorossiysk
- 2017–: PFC CSKA Moscow (academy)
- * Club domestic league appearances and goals

Oleg Vasilyevich Dolmatov (Russian: Олег Васильевич Долматов; born 29 November 1948) is a Russian football manager and a former player who is coaching at the academy of PFC CSKA Moscow.

== Honors ==
- Soviet Top League winner: 1976 (spring)
- Soviet Cup winner: 1977
- UEFA Euro 1972 runner-up
- Top 33 players year-end list: 1971, 1973
- UEFA Cup Winners' Cup finalist: 1972

=== As a coach ===
- Russian Premier League runner-up: 1998
- Russian Premier League bronze: 1999

== International career ==
Dolmatov made his debut for USSR on 18 September 1971 in a friendly against India. He earned 14 caps for the USSR national football team, and participated in UEFA Euro 1972. He also played in one qualifier game for the 1978 FIFA World Cup.
