= Aleksei Petrushin =

Russian footballer (born 1952)

Personal information
- Full name: Aleksei Alekseyevich Petrushin
- Date of birth: 29 January 1952 (age 74)
- Place of birth: Lyubertsy, Russian SFSR
- Height: 1.74 m (5 ft 9 in)
- Positions: Defender; midfielder

Youth career
- 1961–1965: ODO Lyubertsy
- 1966–1968: Torpedo Lyubertsy

Senior career*
Years	Team	Apps	(Gls)
1969	Torpedo Lyubertsy		
1970–1981	Dynamo Moscow	244	(21)
1981–1984	Pakhtakor Tashkent	78	(2)
1985	Kuban Krasnodar	6	(0)

Managerial career
- 1985: Shakhrikhanets Shahrixon (assistant)
- 1986–1987: Pakhtakor Andijan (assistant)
- 1990: Pakhtakor Andijan
- 1991: Prometey Lyubertsy
- 1992: Dynamo-Gazovik Tyumen (assistant)
- 1992: Dynamo-Gazovik Tyumen
- 1993–1994: Arsenal Tula
- 1995: Spartak Shchyolkovo
- 1996–1998: Dynamo-2 Moscow (assistant)
- 1998: Dynamo Moscow (assistant)
- 1999: Dynamo Moscow
- 2000: Shinnik Yaroslavl
- 2001: Khimki
- 2003: Lukoil Chelyabinsk
- 2004–2005: Kairat
- 2006: Dinamo Minsk
- 2007: Metallurg Lipetsk
- 2008: Lukhovitsy
- 2009–2010: Sokol Saratov
- 2011–2012: Chelyabinsk
- 2014–2015: Spartak Semey
- 2017–2018: Ordabasy
- 2020: Aktobe
- * Club domestic league appearances and goals

Aleksei Alekseyevich Petrushin (Russian: Алексей Алексеевич Петрушин; born 29 January 1952) is a Russian professional football coach and former player.

== Playing career ==
Petrushin made his professional debut as a player in the Soviet Second League in 1969 for Torpedo Lyubertsy.

== Coaching career ==
On 5 February 2017, Petrushin was appointed as manager of FC Ordabasy.

== Honours as a player ==
- Soviet Top League champion: 1976 (spring).
- Soviet Top League bronze: 1973, 1975.
- Soviet Cup winner: 1977.
- Soviet Cup finalist: 1979.
