= Genrikh Fedosov =

Soviet footballer

Personal information
- Full name: Genrikh Aleksandrovich Fedosov
- Date of birth: 6 December 1932
- Place of birth: Velikiye Luki, USSR
- Date of death: 20 December 2005 (aged 73)
- Place of death: Moscow, Russia
- Height: 1.82 m (6 ft 0 in)
- Position: Forward

Youth career
- FC Dynamo Molotov

Senior career*
Years	Team	Apps	(Gls)
1950–1953	FC Krylia Sovetov Molotov		
1954–1961	FC Dynamo Moscow	145	(48)
1962	FC Dynamo Kirov	20	(10)
1963–1964	FC Shinnik Yaroslavl	57	(12)
1965	FC Znamya Noginsk	34	(9)
1966	FC Neftyanik Ukhta		

International career
1957–1959	USSR	3	(1)
- * Club domestic league appearances and goals

Genrikh Aleksandrovich Fedosov (Russian: Генрих Александрович Федосов; 6 December 1932 – 20 December 2005) was a Soviet football player.

== Honours ==
- Soviet Top League winner: 1954, 1955, 1957, 1959.

== International career ==
Fedosov made his debut for USSR on 24 November 1957 in a 1958 FIFA World Cup qualifier against Poland and scored on his debut. He was selected for the final tournament squad, but did not play in any games there.
