= Vladimir Kazachyonok =

Russian footballer

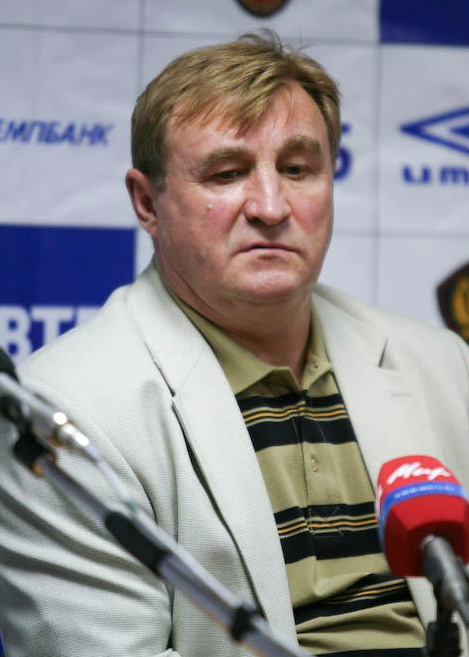

Personal information
- Full name: Vladimir Aleksandrovich Kazachyonok
- Date of birth: 6 September 1952
- Place of birth: Kolpino, Russian SFSR
- Date of death: 26 March 2017 (aged 64)
- Place of death: Saint Petersburg, Russia
- Height: 1.80 m (5 ft 11 in)
- Position: Forward

Youth career
- Izhorets Kolpino

Senior career*
Years	Team	Apps	(Gls)
1971–1975	Zenit Leningrad	46	(7)
1976–1978	Dynamo Moscow	64	(12)
1979–1983	Zenit Leningrad	144	(58)

International career
1976–1979	USSR	2	(0)

Managerial career
- 1988–1989: Dynamo Leningrad
- 1992–1999: Zenit St. Petersburg (academy)
- 2001–2002: Svetogorets Svetogorsk
- 2003: Zenit St. Petersburg (academy)
- 2003: Dynamo St. Petersburg
- 2004: Zenit St. Petersburg (academy)
- 2004–2005: Petrotrest St. Petersburg
- 2006–2007: Khimki
- 2009: Smena-Zenit St. Petersburg
- 2010–2011: Sillamäe Kalev
- 2013: Sillamäe Kalev (sporting director)
- 2014–2017: Zenit St. Petersburg (academy director)
- * Club domestic league appearances and goals

Vladimir Aleksandrovich Kazachyonok (Russian: Владимир Александрович Казачёнок; 6 September 1952 – 26 March 2017) was a Soviet football player and Russian coach. He was the academy director with Zenit St. Petersburg until his death in 2017.

== International career ==
Kazachyonok made his debut for USSR on 1 December 1976 in a friendly against Brazil. He also played in a UEFA Euro 1980 qualifier against Finland.

== Death ==
On 26 March 2017, it was reported that Kazachyonok died in Saint Petersburg at the age of 64.

== Honours ==
- Soviet Cup winner: 1977.
