= Nikolai Kolesov =

Russian footballer

Personal information
- Full name: Nikolai Borisovich Kolesov
- Date of birth: 16 February 1956
- Place of birth: Moscow, Russian SFSR
- Date of death: 23 August 1998 (aged 42)
- Place of death: Moscow, Russia
- Height: 1.74 m (5 ft 8 1/2 in)
- Positions: Midfielder; striker

Youth career
- FC Dynamo Moscow

Senior career*
Years	Team	Apps	(Gls)
1973–1980	FC Dynamo Moscow	73	(13)
1981–1987	FC Kuban Krasnodar	175	(48)
1988	FC Arsenal Tula	26	(3)
1989	FC Zarya Bălţi	40	(6)
1990	FC Vorskla Poltava	11	(2)
1991–1994	FC KAMAZ Naberezhnye Chelny	110	(13)
- * Club domestic league appearances and goals

Nikolai Borisovich Kolesov (Russian: Николай Борисович Колесов; born February 16, 1956; died August 23, 1998) was a Russian professional footballer.

== Club career ==
He made his professional debut in the Soviet Top League in 1976 for FC Dynamo Moscow.

== European club competitions ==
With FC Dynamo Moscow.

- European Cup Winners' Cup 1977–78: 4 games, 3 goals (hat-trick against Valletta F.C.).
- European Cup Winners' Cup 1979–80: 3 games, 1 goal.
- UEFA Cup 1980–81: 1 game.
