= Aleksandr Maksimenkov =

Russian footballer

Personal information
- Full name: Aleksandr Ivanovich Maksimenkov
- Date of birth: 17 August 1952
- Place of birth: Pochinok, Russian SFSR
- Date of death: 7 September 2012 (aged 60)
- Height: 1.88 m (6 ft 2 in)
- Position: Midfielder

Youth career
- Smolensk IF
- Burevestnik Smolensk

Senior career*
Years	Team	Apps	(Gls)
1972–1973	Iskra Smolensk		
1974–1975	Torpedo Moscow	48	(7)
1976–1981	Dynamo Moscow	141	(21)

International career
1977–1979	Soviet Union	8	(1)

Managerial career
- 1984–1985: Dynamo Moscow (youth)
- 1984–1985: Dynamo Moscow (assistant)
- 1987: Dynamo-2 Moscow (assistant)
- 1988: Serpukhov
- 1988–1992: Dynamo Moscow (youth)
- 1993: Jordan
- 1994–1995: Dynamo Moscow (youth)
- 1996–1997: Dynamo-2 Moscow
- 2000: Stolitsa Moscow
- * Club domestic league appearances and goals

Aleksandr Ivanovich Maksimenkov (Russian: Александр Иванович Максименков; 17 August 1952 – 7 September 2012) was a Soviet and Russian football player and coach.

== International career ==
Maksimenkov made his debut for USSR on 20 March 1977, scoring in a friendly match against Tunisia. He played in the 1978 FIFA World Cup qualifiers and in one UEFA Euro 1980 qualifier (the USSR did not qualify for the final tournament for either).

== Honours ==
- Soviet Top League winner, spring 1976
- Soviet Cup winner, 1977
