= 1983 Soviet Top League =

46th season of top-tier football league in Soviet Union

Soviet Top League
- Season: 1983
- Champions: Dnepr Dnepropetrovsk
- Relegated: Torpedo Kutaisi, Nistru Kishinev
- European Cup: Dnepr Dnepropetrovsk
- Cup Winners' Cup: Dinamo Moscow
- UEFA Cup: Spartak Moscow; Dinamo Minsk
- Matches: 306
- Goals: 725 (2.37 per match)
- Top goalscorer: (18) Yuri Gavrilov (Spartak)

Statistics of Soviet Top League for the 1983 season.

== Teams ==
=== Promoted teams ===
- Žalgiris Vilnius – champion (returning after 21 seasons)
- Nistru Kishinev – 2nd place (returning after nine seasons)

=== Location ===
Locations of teams in the 1984 Top League

== League standings ==
Pos	Team	Pld	W	D	L	GF	GA	GD	Pts	Qualification
1	(Ukrainian Soviet Socialist Republic) Dnipro Dnipropetrovsk (C)	34	22	5	7	63	36	+27	49	Qualification for European Cup first round
2	(Russian Soviet Federative Socialist Republic) Spartak Moscow	34	18	9	7	60	25	+35	45	Qualification for UEFA Cup first round
3	(Byelorussian Soviet Socialist Republic) Dinamo Minsk	34	17	9	8	51	34	+17	43	Qualification for UEFA Cup first round
4	(Russian Soviet Federative Socialist Republic) Zenit Leningrad	34	15	11	8	42	32	+10	40 (Note: 1 point deducted (10 draw limit))	
5	(Lithuanian Soviet Socialist Republic) Žalgiris Vilnius	34	15	9	10	38	36	+2	39	
6	(Russian Soviet Federative Socialist Republic) Torpedo Moscow	34	14	11	9	40	34	+6	38	
7	(Ukrainian Soviet Socialist Republic) Dynamo Kyiv	34	14	10	10	50	34	+16	38	
8	(Ukrainian Soviet Socialist Republic) Chornomorets Odessa	34	16	5	13	44	46	−2	37	
9	(Ukrainian Soviet Socialist Republic) Shakhtar Donetsk	34	16	5	13	48	40	+8	37	
10	(Uzbek Soviet Socialist Republic) Pakhtakor Tashkent	34	13	9	12	37	34	+3	35	
11	(Ukrainian Soviet Socialist Republic) Metalist Kharkiv	34	12	8	14	38	40	−2	32	
12	(Russian Soviet Federative Socialist Republic) CSKA Moscow	34	11	12	11	37	33	+4	32 (Note: 2 points deducted (10 draw limit))	
13	(Azerbaijan Soviet Socialist Republic) Neftchi Baku	34	10	10	14	32	38	−6	30	
14	(Armenian Soviet Socialist Republic) Ararat Yerevan	34	11	7	16	29	47	−18	29	
15	(Russian Soviet Federative Socialist Republic) Dynamo Moscow	34	9	11	14	30	37	−7	28	Qualification for Cup Winners' Cup first round
16	(Georgian Soviet Socialist Republic) Dinamo Tbilisi	34	9	9	16	41	48	−7	27	
17	(Georgian Soviet Socialist Republic) Torpedo Kutaisi (R)	34	4	10	20	26	58	−32	18	Relegation to First League
18	(Moldavian Soviet Socialist Republic) Nistru Kishinev (R)	34	3	4	27	19	73	−54	10	Relegation to First League

(C) Champions; (R) Relegated

== Results ==
Home \ Away	ARA	CHO	CSK	DNI	DYK	DMN	DYN	DTB	MKH	NEF	NIS	PAK	SHA	SPA	TKU	TOR	ŽAL	ZEN
Ararat Yerevan		3–0	1–1	0–2	2–1	2–0	1–0	1–1	1–0	1–0	1–0	1–2	0–1	0–1	2–2	1–0	1–0	1–1
Chornomorets Odessa	2–0		1–1	1–0	1–2	3–1	1–0	4–1	2–1	2–0	1–1	0–1	2–1	1–0	0–0	2–3	0–0	2–0
CSKA Moscow	1–2	1–2		0–2	4–1	0–1	0–0	0–1	1–1	2–1	1–0	1–1	1–0	1–1	1–0	0–0	1–2	2–1
Dnipro	4–0	2–0	1–2		2–1	2–1	3–1	2–1	2–1	1–0	6–0	2–1	3–2	4–2	0–0	2–1	3–1	1–0
Dynamo Kyiv	3–0	6–0	1–0	2–1		0–2	2–1	1–1	2–1	0–0	3–0	2–0	1–1	1–1	8–0	0–1	4–1	2–2
Dinamo Minsk	2–0	3–0	1–1	1–2	0–0		1–1	1–0	2–0	1–0	0–0	2–1	2–0	3–2	3–1	1–1	1–0	2–0
Dynamo Moscow	2–1	0–4	1–2	1–0	1–1	2–2		1–0	2–1	3–1	2–1	0–0	0–1	0–0	1–1	1–1	1–2	1–2
Dinamo Tbilisi	3–0	3–0	2–0	3–1	1–0	1–2	0–0		0–0	1–1	2–0	1–1	2–3	0–3	2–0	0–0	3–1	1–2
Metalist Kharkiv	0–0	2–0	1–1	1–1	2–0	1–1	1–0	4–3		1–0	3–1	1–0	1–0	1–2	1–0	1–1	2–1	1–1
Neftçi Baku	3–0	1–1	0–0	2–2	2–0	2–1	1–1	3–2	1–0		0–0	2–0	3–1	2–1	0–0	0–1	3–0	2–5
Nistru Chișinău	2–4	1–4	1–2	0–1	0–1	1–3	0–3	1–0	0–2	0–1		2–0	0–1	1–6	1–2	0–3	1–1	0–1
Pakhtakor Tashkent	3–0	1–2	1–0	0–1	3–0	2–2	1–0	1–0	4–1	4–0	2–1		2–1	0–0	2–1	1–3	0–0	0–3
Shakhtar Donetsk	3–0	2–0	0–1	1–3	1–2	3–0	0–1	6–3	1–0	2–0	6–2	0–1		0–4	1–0	1–0	3–0	0–0
Spartak Moscow	3–1	4–0	2–2	1–1	0–0	0–2	3–0	5–1	1–0	2–0	1–0	1–0	1–2		0–0	1–1	1–0	3–0
Torpedo Kutaisi	0–0	1–3	1–6	2–3	0–1	1–1	0–2	2–2	1–2	0–0	0–1	1–1	3–1	0–4		3–1	1–2	1–0
Torpedo Moscow	2–1	0–1	1–0	3–0	2–1	0–4	2–1	1–0	3–2	0–0	1–0	1–1	0–0	0–2	4–1		1–1	0–2
Žalgiris Vilnius	2–1	2–1	2–1	2–1	0–0	2–1	1–0	0–0	3–2	1–0	5–0	2–0	2–1	1–0	1–1	0–0		0–1
Zenit Leningrad	0–0	2–1	0–0	2–2	1–1	3–1	0–0	1–0	2–0	2–1	4–1	0–0	0–2	0–2	1–0	3–2	0–0	

Legend: Blue = home team win; Yellow = draw; Red = away team win.

== Top scorers ==
18 goals

- Yuri Gavrilov (Spartak Moscow)

17 goals

- Igor Gurinovich (Dinamo Minsk)

15 goals

- Volodymyr Fink (Chornomorets)
- Khoren Hovhannisyan (Ararat)
- Mykhaylo Sokolovsky (Shakhtar)
- Andrei Yakubik (Pakhtakor)

14 goals

- Sigitas Jakubauskas (Žalgiris)

13 goals

- Viktor Kolyadko (CSKA Moscow)
- Oleh Taran (Dnipro)

11 goals

- Valery Gazzaev (Dynamo Moscow)
- Valeriy Petrakov (Torpedo Moscow)
- Igor Ponomaryov (Neftchi)
- Ramaz Shengelia (Dinamo Tbilisi)
- Aleksandr Tarkhanov (CSKA Moscow)
- Vadym Yevtushenko (Dynamo Kyiv)

== Medal squads ==
(league appearances and goals listed in brackets)

1. FC Dnipro Dnipropetrovsk

Goalkeepers: Serhiy Krakovskyi (34).
Defenders: Mykola Pavlov (33 / 3), Petro Kutuzov (27), Oleksandr Lysenko (17 / 1), Yuriy Mirhorodskyi (17), Serhiy Puchkov (13), Oleksandr Chervonyi (9), Andriy Bobrikov (7), Volodymyr Ustinov (6), Anatoliy Nazarenko (5), Valeriy Zuyev (2).
Midfielders: Andriy Dilay (34 / 2), Vyktor Kuznetsov (31 / 7), Volodymyr Ustymchyk (30 / 5), Oleh Serebryanskyi (26 / 1), Hennadiy Lytovchenko (24 / 5), Mykola Fedorenko (17 / 3), Volodymyr Bahmut (6), Volodymyr Kobzarev (5).
Forwards: Oleh Taran (30 / 13), Volodymyr Lyutyi (24 / 9), Oleh Protasov (21 / 7), Aleksandr Pogorelov (21 / 5).

Manager: Volodymyr Yemets.

Transferred out during the season: Volodymyr Ustinov (to FC Kolos Nikopol), Valeriy Zuyev (retired).

2. FC Spartak Moscow

Goalkeepers: Rinat Dasayev (34), Andrei Mikhalychev (1).
Defenders: Sergei Bazulev (30), Gennady Morozov (30), Yevgeni Mileshkin (29 / 1), Vladimir Sochnov (25 / 3), Boris Pozdnyakov (25), Oleg Romantsev (17), Aleksandr Bubnov (13), Sergei Savchenkov (3), Sergei Shulgin (1).
Midfielders: Yuri Gavrilov (34 / 18), Yevgeni Kuznetsov (34 / 5), Fyodor Cherenkov (33 / 10), Valeri Gladilin (26 / 9), Yuri Reznik (25 / 4), Edgar Gess (18 / 2), Sergei Shvetsov (8), Mikhail Dubinin (5 / 2), Vladimir Korolyov (1), Sergei Nikitin (1).
Forwards: Sergey Rodionov (16 / 5), Sergei Argudyayev (6), Mikhail Rusyayev (5), Oleg Kuzhlev (2), Oleg Smirnov (1).

Manager: Konstantin Beskov.

Transferred out during the season: Oleg Romantsev (retired), Mikhail Dubinin (to FC Metallurg Aldan).

3. FC Dinamo Minsk

Goalkeepers: Yury Kurbyko (30), Mikhail Vergeyenko (4), Arkadi Batalov (1).
Defenders: Yuri Kurnenin (32 / 1), Sergei Borovsky (32), Viktor Yanushevsky (30), Viktor Shishkin (24), Liudas Rumbutis (22 / 3), Oļegs Aleksejenko (18), Igor Belov (10), Yury Trukhan (5).
Midfielders: Andrei Zygmantovich (30 / 1), Sergey Gotsmanov (29 / 5), Sergei Aleinikov (29 / 2), Yuri Pudyshev (26 / 1), Aleksandr Prokopenko (12 / 2), Valeri Melnikov (9 / 1).
Forwards: Igor Gurinovich (28 / 17), Georgi Kondratyev (28 / 8), Viktor Sokol (18 / 9), Pyotr Vasilevsky (17 / 1).

Manager: Eduard Malofeyev.

Transferred out during the season: Aleksandr Prokopenko (released).

== Number of teams by union republic ==
Rank	Union republic	Number of teams	Club(s)
1	RSFSR	5	CSKA Moscow, Dinamo Moscow, Spartak Moscow, Torpedo Moscow, Zenit Leningrad
1	Ukrainian SSR	5	Chernomorets Odessa, Dinamo Kiev, Dnepr Dnepropetrovsk, Metallist Kharkov, Shakhter Donetsk
3	Georgian SSR	2	Dinamo Tbilisi, Torpedo Kutaisi
4	Armenian SSR	1	Ararat Yerevan
4	Azerbaijan SSR	1	Neftchi Baku
4	Belarusian SSR	1	Dinamo Minsk
4	Moldavian SSR	1	Nistru Kishinev
4	Lithuanian SSR	1	Zhalgiris Vilnius
4	Uzbek SSR	1	Pakhtakor Tashkent

== Attendances ==
No.	Club	Average
1	Shakhtar Donetsk	31,376
2	Dinamo Minsk	27,024
3	Zenit	26,712
4	Metalist Kharkiv	26,412
5	Spartak Moscow	26,047
6	Dynamo Kyiv	25,147
7	Dinamo Tbilisi	24,024
8	Dnipro	23,347
9	Chornomorets	22,088
10	Paxtakor	19,841
11	Ararat	18,794
12	Torpedo Kutaisi	18,000
13	Neftçhi	17,265
14	Nistru	17,112
15	Žalgiris	12,141
16	PFC CSKA	10,782
17	Dynamo Moscow	8,576
18	Torpedo Moscow	6,835
