= 1982 Soviet Top League =

45th season of top-tier football league in Soviet Union

Soviet Top League
- Season: 1982
- Champions: Dinamo Minsk
- Relegated: Kuban Krasnodar, Kairat Alma-Ata
- European Cup: Dinamo Minsk
- Cup Winners' Cup: Shakhter Donetsk
- UEFA Cup: Spartak Moscow; Dinamo Kiev
- Matches: 306
- Goals: 776 (2.54 per match)
- Top goalscorer: (23) Andrei Yakubik (Pakhtakor)

Statistics of Soviet Top League for the 1982 season.

== Overview ==
It was contested by 18 teams, and Dinamo Minsk won the championship.

The rules stated that a team could only have a maximum of 10 draws; all points from matches draw since the eleventh wouldn't be counted.

== League standings ==
Pos	Team	Pld	W	D	L	GF	GA	GD	Pts	Qualification or relegation
1	(Byelorussian Soviet Socialist Republic) Dinamo Minsk (C)	34	19	9	6	63	35	+28	47	Qualification for European Cup first round
2	(Ukrainian Soviet Socialist Republic) Dynamo Kyiv	34	18	10	6	58	25	+33	46	Qualification for UEFA Cup first round
3	(Russian Soviet Federative Socialist Republic) Spartak Moscow	34	16	9	9	59	35	+24	41	Qualification for UEFA Cup first round
4	(Georgian Soviet Socialist Republic) Dinamo Tbilisi	34	16	9	9	51	47	+4	41	
5	(Armenian Soviet Socialist Republic) Ararat Yerevan	34	14	10	10	50	47	+3	38	
6	(Uzbek Soviet Socialist Republic) Pakhtakor Tashkent	34	13	11	10	42	38	+4	36 (Note: 1 point deducted (10 draw limit))	
7	(Russian Soviet Federative Socialist Republic) Zenit Leningrad	34	12	9	13	44	41	+3	33	
8	(Russian Soviet Federative Socialist Republic) Torpedo Moscow	34	11	12	11	36	33	+3	32 (Note: 2 points deducted (10 draw limit))	
9	(Ukrainian Soviet Socialist Republic) Dnipro Dnipropetrovsk	34	11	12	11	34	38	−4	32	
10	(Ukrainian Soviet Socialist Republic) Chornomorets Odessa	34	11	11	12	30	36	−6	32	
11	(Russian Soviet Federative Socialist Republic) Dynamo Moscow	34	13	5	16	42	52	−10	31	
12	(Ukrainian Soviet Socialist Republic) Metalist Kharkiv	34	10	11	13	32	34	−2	30	
13	(Georgian Soviet Socialist Republic) Torpedo Kutaisi	34	10	10	14	39	45	−6	30	
14	(Ukrainian Soviet Socialist Republic) Shakhtar Donetsk	34	10	9	15	42	57	−15	29	Qualification for Cup Winners' Cup first round
15	(Russian Soviet Federative Socialist Republic) CSKA Moscow	34	10	9	15	41	46	−5	29	
16	(Azerbaijan Soviet Socialist Republic) Neftchi Baku	34	10	7	17	42	63	−21	27	
17	(Russian Soviet Federative Socialist Republic) Kuban Krasnodar (R)	34	9	9	16	37	48	−11	27	Relegation to First League
18	(Kazakh Soviet Socialist Republic) Kairat Alma-Ata (R)	34	7	10	17	34	56	−22	24	Relegation to First League

(C) Champions; (R) Relegated

== Results ==
Home \ Away	ARA	CHO	CSK	DNI	DYK	DMN	DYN	DTB	KAI	KUB	MKH	NEF	PAK	SHA	SPA	TKU	TOR	ZEN
Ararat Yerevan		6–1	3–2	1–3	2–3	1–1	2–2	1–1	3–2	2–1	0–0	3–0	1–1	2–1	1–1	3–1	4–1	2–0
Chornomorets Odessa	0–1		0–2	1–1	1–0	1–0	3–2	0–1	1–1	1–0	1–2	3–2	3–1	2–0	1–0	0–1	1–0	0–0
CSKA Moscow	2–3	1–2		1–1	1–1	2–3	1–2	2–3	1–0	2–2	1–0	2–0	0–1	1–0	0–2	3–0	2–1	1–1
Dnipro Dnipropetrosk	1–1	1–0	1–0		0–0	1–3	3–2	0–0	3–2	1–0	0–0	2–0	0–0	2–0	0–0	1–1	0–0	3–1
Dynamo Kyiv	4–0	0–0	3–0	1–1		2–3	2–1	3–1	3–0	3–0	2–1	4–0	1–0	5–0	1–2	2–0	0–0	1–1
Dinamo Minsk	1–1	2–1	1–1	2–0	1–1		1–0	2–0	3–2	0–0	2–0	3–1	0–0	3–0	1–0	3–2	0–1	0–0
Dynamo Moscow	2–0	0–1	0–1	3–0	2–1	0–7		2–1	2–0	1–1	1–1	2–0	3–1	0–3	0–2	2–1	1–1	2–0
Dinamo Tbilisi	1–1	1–0	1–1	3–1	1–5	4–1	1–0		1–0	3–1	1–0	5–3	2–1	2–2	3–1	2–1	2–0	2–1
Kairat Alma-Ata	1–2	1–0	1–0	1–0	1–2	2–2	1–2	2–2		2–2	1–1	2–0	1–1	2–1	0–4	1–0	1–1	2–3
Kuban Krasnodar	1–0	3–3	2–0	0–1	0–1	1–3	4–1	0–2	1–1		1–0	3–1	2–2	1–0	0–2	1–0	0–0	1–2
Metalist Kharkiv	1–0	0–0	2–2	1–0	0–0	2–1	2–1	3–0	0–1	1–0		2–1	2–0	2–0	1–3	3–3	1–2	0–0
Neftçi Baku	0–1	1–1	2–2	3–0	2–1	3–2	2–1	0–0	1–0	2–3	1–0		4–2	2–2	4–3	3–2	0–2	1–0
Pakhtakor Tashkent	0–0	2–0	2–1	3–1	0–2	0–3	3–0	2–0	0–0	2–1	2–1	3–2		2–1	2–0	0–0	1–1	5–0
Shakhtar Donetsk	3–1	0–0	2–0	2–1	0–0	2–1	1–1	3–3	3–2	1–0	2–1	0–0	3–1		2–2	1–1	0–1	4–3
Spartak Moscow	1–2	1–1	2–1	0–0	1–2	3–4	0–1	4–1	3–0	3–1	0–0	5–0	0–0	3–2		2–0	2–0	1–1
Torpedo Kutaisi	2–0	1–1	0–2	2–3	1–1	0–0	2–1	1–0	2–0	1–1	2–2	1–0	3–1	2–0	2–4		2–1	2–0
Torpedo Moscow	1–0	2–0	1–1	2–1	0–1	1–2	1–2	0–0	1–1	3–1	2–0	0–0	0–0	5–1	1–2	0–0		2–0
Zenit Leningrad	5–0	0–0	1–2	2–1	2–0	0–2	2–0	3–1	5–0	1–2	1–0	1–1	0–1	3–0	0–0	1–0	4–2	

Legend: Blue = home team win; Yellow = draw; Red = away team win.

== Top scorers ==
23 goals

- Andrei Yakubik (Pakhtakor)

18 goals

- Merab Megreladze (Torpedo Kutaisi)

16 goals

- Ramaz Shengelia (Dinamo Tbilisi)
- Aleksandr Tarkhanov (CSKA)

13 goals

- Igor Gurinovich (Dinamo Minsk)

12 goals

- Boris Chukhlov (Zenit)
- Valery Gazzaev (Dynamo Moscow)
- Khoren Hovhannisyan (Ararat)
- Andrei Redkous (Torpedo Moscow)
- Mykhaylo Sokolovsky (Shakhtar)

== Medal squads ==
(league appearances and goals listed in brackets)

1. FC Dinamo Minsk

Goalkeepers: Mikhail Vergeyenko (28 / 1), Yury Kurbyko (7).
Defenders: Yuri Kurnenin (31 / 7), Yury Trukhan (29), Viktor Yanushevsky (27), Sergei Borovsky (25), Viktor Shishkin (18), Liudas Rumbutis (17), Igor Belov (12).
Midfielders: Aleksandr Prokopenko (31 / 11), Sergey Gotsmanov (31 / 2), Andrei Zygmantovich (30 / 2), Yuri Pudyshev (29 / 3), Sergei Aleinikov (21 / 8), Valeri Melnikov (18), Alyaksandr Vanyushkin (1).
Forwards: Georgi Kondratyev (32 / 10), Igor Gurinovich (28 / 13), Pyotr Vasilevsky (20 / 5), Viktor Sokol (2 / 1).

Manager: Eduard Malofeyev.

Transferred out during the season: none.

2. FC Dynamo Kyiv

Goalkeepers: Viktor Chanov (24), Mykhaylo Mykhaylov (12).
Defenders: Anatoliy Demyanenko (32 / 5), Oleksandr Sorokalet (29), Volodymyr Lozynskyi (28 / 1), Sergei Baltacha (26 / 1), Mykhaylo Olefirenko (25 / 2), Volodymyr Bezsonov (18 / 4), Oleksandr Boyko (12), Yuriy Makhynya (2).
Midfielders: Andriy Bal (31 / 5), Yaroslav Dumanskyi (29 / 2), Leonid Buryak (21 / 3), Aleksandr Khapsalis (14 / 2), Vasyl Rats (11 / 1), Volodymyr Veremeyev (10), Pavlo Yakovenko (4).
Forwards: Viktor Khlus (31 / 10), Vadym Yevtushenko (25 / 9), Oleg Blokhin (24 / 10), Hryhoriy Pasechnyi (4 / 1).

Manager: Valeriy Lobanovskyi.

Transferred out during the season: none.

3. FC Spartak Moscow

Goalkeepers: Rinat Dasayev (28), Aleksei Prudnikov (12).
Defenders: Oleg Romantsev (33 / 1), Vladimir Sochnov (33 / 1), Gennady Morozov (27), Vladimir Shcherbak (24), Boris Pozdnyakov (19), Vladimir Bukiyevskiy (4), Ivan Vyshnevskyi (2), Alexander Mirzoyan (2).
Midfielders: Sergey Shavlo (34 / 11), Fyodor Cherenkov (33 / 10), Yuri Gavrilov (31 / 6), Edgar Gess (30 / 5), Yevgeni Kuznetsov (17), Sergei Nikitin (2).
Forwards: Sergey Rodionov (30 / 9), Aleksandr Kalashnikov (26 / 5), Sergei Shvetsov (24 / 9), Viktor Hrachov (5 / 1), Mikhail Rusyayev (3), Vladimir Nikonov (1), Oleg Smirnov (1).

Manager: Konstantin Beskov.

Transferred out during the season: Viktor Hrachov (to FC Shakhtar Donetsk).

== Number of teams by union republic ==
Rank	Union republic	Number of teams	Club(s)
1	RSFSR	6	CSKA Moscow, Dinamo Moscow, Kuban Krasnodar, Spartak Moscow, Torpedo Moscow, Zenit Leningrad
2	Ukrainian SSR	5	Chernomorets Odessa, Dinamo Kiev, Dnepr Dnepropetrovsk, Metallist Kharkov, Shakhter Donetsk
3	Georgian SSR	2	Dinamo Tbilisi, Torpedo Kutaisi
4	Armenian SSR	1	Ararat Yerevan
4	Azerbaijan SSR	1	Neftchi Baku
4	Belarusian SSR	1	Dinamo Minsk
4	Kazakh SSR	1	Kairat Alma-Ata
4	Uzbek SSR	1	Pakhtakor Tashkent

== Attendances ==
No.	Club	Average
1	Dinamo Tbilisi	41,153
2	Metalist Kharkiv	31,847
3	Dynamo Kyiv	27,365
4	Dinamo Minsk	26,276
5	Shakhtar Donetsk	23,388
6	Torpedo Kutaisi	20,882
7	Zenit	18,229
8	Kuban	17,994
9	Ararat	17,312
10	Chornomorets	16,282
11	Spartak Moscow	15,765
12	Dnipro	15,029
13	Paxtakor	14,735
14	Kairat	11,726
15	Neftçhi	8,859
16	Dynamo Moscow	8,853
17	PFC CSKA	8,159
18	Torpedo Moscow	5,847
