= 1983–84 European Cup =

European football tournament

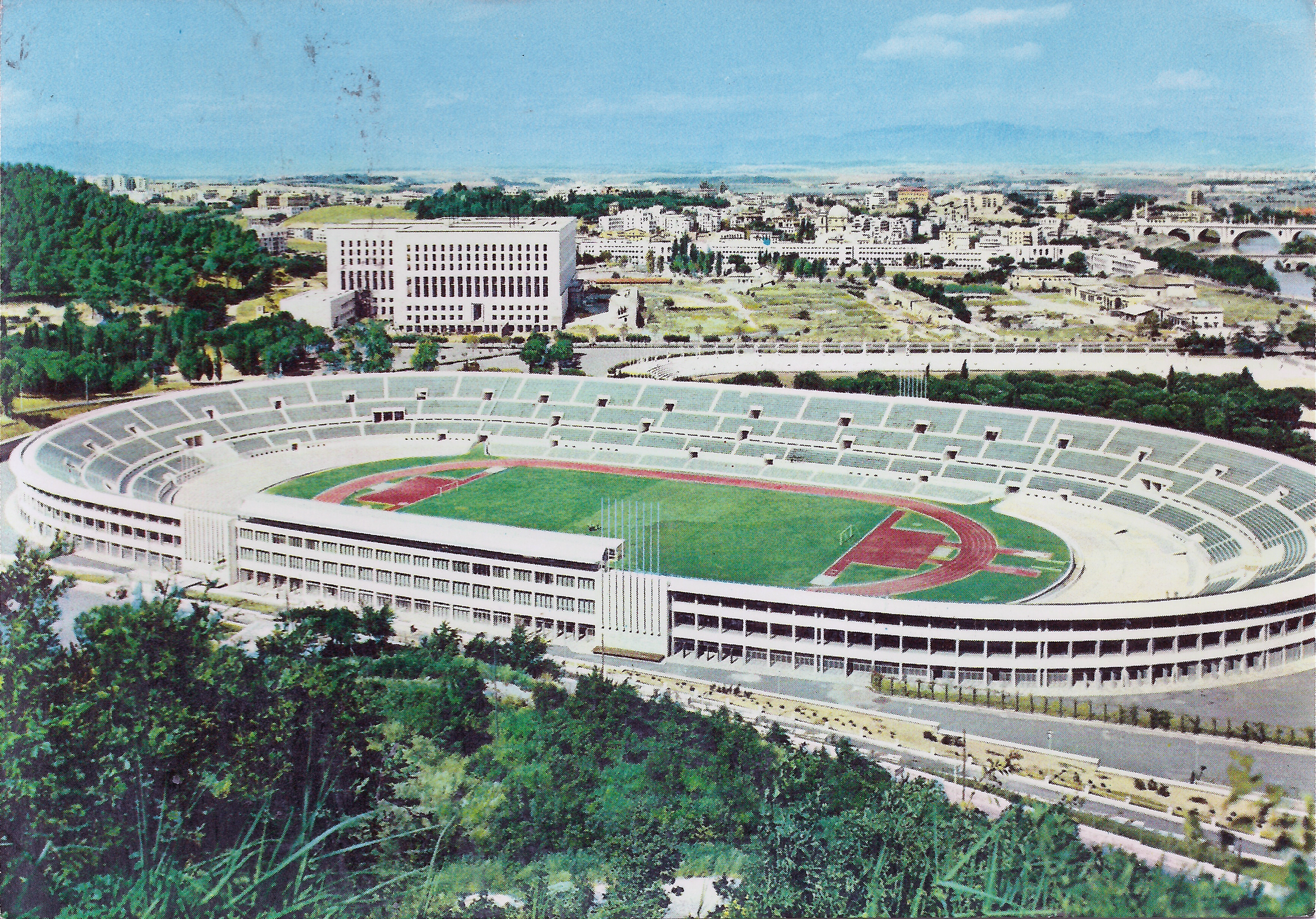
- Stadio Olimpico in Rome hosted the final.

Tournament details
- Dates: 14 September 1983 – 30 May 1984
- Teams: 32 (31 competed)

Final positions
- Champions: (England) Liverpool (4th title)
- Runners-up: (Italy) Roma

Tournament statistics
- Matches played: 59
- Goals scored: 165 (2.8 per match)
- Attendance: 1,798,652 (30,486 per match)
- Top scorer(s): Viktor Sokol (Dinamo Minsk); 6 goals

The 1983–84 European Cup was the 29th season of the European Cup, UEFA's premier club football competition. The tournament was won for a fourth time by Liverpool in a penalty shoot-out in the final against Roma. The game had finished 1–1. Phil Neal had scored for Liverpool and Roberto Pruzzo for Roma. It was the seventh title in eight seasons for English clubs.

Hamburg, the defending champions, were eliminated by Dinamo București in the second round.

== Teams ==
(Albania) Vllaznia (1st)	(Austria) Rapid Wien (1st)	(Belgium) Standard Liège (1st)	(Bulgaria) CSKA Sofia (1st)
(Cyprus) Omonia (1st)	(Czechoslovakia) Bohemians Prague (1st)	(Denmark) Odense (1st)	(England) Liverpool (1st)
(Finland) Kuusysi (1st)	(France) Nantes (1st)	(East Germany) BFC Dynamo (1st)	(West Germany) Hamburg (1st)^{TH}
(Greece) Olympiacos (1st)	(Hungary) Rába ETO Győr (1st)	(Iceland) Víkingur (1st)	(Republic of Ireland) Athlone Town (1st)
(Italy) Roma (1st)	(Luxembourg) Jeunesse Esch (1st)	(Malta) Ħamrun Spartans (1st)	(Netherlands) Ajax (1st)
(Northern Ireland) Linfield (1st)	(Norway) Viking (1st)	(Poland) Lech Poznań (1st)	(Portugal) Benfica (1st)
(Romania) Dinamo București (1st)	(Scotland) Dundee United (1st)	(Spain) Athletic Bilbao (1st)	(Sweden) Gothenburg (1st)
(Switzerland) Grasshopper (1st)	(Turkey) Fenerbahçe (1st)	(Soviet Union) Dinamo Minsk (1st)	(Socialist Federal Republic of Yugoslavia) Partizan (1st)

== Bracket ==
First round
(Denmark) Odense	0	0	0
(England) Liverpool	1	5	6
(Poland) Lech Poznań	2	0	2
(Spain) Athletic Bilbao	0	4	4
(Netherlands) Ajax	0	0	0
(Greece) Olympiacos	0	2	2
(Portugal) Benfica	3	3	6
(Northern Ireland) Linfield	0	2	2
(Hungary) Rába ETO Győr	2	2	4
(Iceland) Vikingur	1	0	1
(Soviet Union) Dinamo Minsk	1	2	3
(Switzerland) Grasshopper	0	2	2
(Finland) Kuusysi	0	0	0
(Romania) Dinamo București	1	3	4
(West Germany) Hamburg	(w)
(Albania) Vllaznia	(o)
(Turkey) Fenerbahçe	0	0	0
(Czechoslovakia) Bohemians Prague	1	4	5
(Austria) Rapid Wien	3	1	4
(France) Nantes	0	3	3
(Republic of Ireland) Athlone Town	2	2	4
(Belgium) Standard Liège	3	8	11
(Malta) Hamrun Spartans	0	0	0
(Scotland) Dundee United	3	3	6
(Bulgaria) CSKA Sofia (a)	3	1	4
(Cyprus) Omonia	0	4	4
(Italy) Roma	3	1	4
(Sweden) Gothenburg	0	2	2
(East Germany) BFC Dynamo	4	2	6
(Luxembourg) Jeunesse Esch	1	0	1
(Socialist Federal Republic of Yugoslavia) Partizan	5	0	5
(Norway) Viking	1	0	1

Second round
(England) Liverpool	0	1	1
(Spain) Athletic Bilbao	0	0	0
(Greece) Olympiacos	1	0	1
(Portugal) Benfica	0	3	3
(Hungary) Rába ETO Győr	3	1	4
(Soviet Union) Dinamo Minsk	6	3	9
(Romania) Dinamo București	3	2	5
(West Germany) Hamburg	0	3	3
(Czechoslovakia) Bohemians Prague	2	0	2
(Austria) Rapid Wien (a)	1	1	2
(Belgium) Standard Liège	0	0	0
(Scotland) Dundee United	0	4	4
(Bulgaria) CSKA Sofia	0	0	0
(Italy) Roma	1	1	2
(East Germany) BFC Dynamo	2	0	2
(Socialist Federal Republic of Yugoslavia) Partizan	0	1	1

Quarter-finals
(England) Liverpool	1	4	5
(Portugal) Benfica	0	1	1
(Soviet Union) Dinamo Minsk	1	0	1
(Romania) Dinamo București	1	1	2
(Austria) Rapid Wien	2	0	2
(Scotland) Dundee United (a)	1	1	2
(Italy) Roma	3	1	4
(East Germany) BFC Dynamo	0	2	2

Semi-finals
(England) Liverpool	1	2	3
(Romania) Dinamo București	0	1	1
(Scotland) Dundee United	2	0	2
(Italy) Roma	0	3	3

Final
(England) Liverpool (a.e.t)	1 (4)
(Italy) Roma	1 (2)

== First round ==
Team 1	Agg.	Team 2	1st leg	2nd leg
Odense (Denmark)	0–6	(England) Liverpool	0–1	0–5
Lech Poznań (Poland)	2–4	(Spain) Athletic Bilbao	2–0	0–4
Ajax (Netherlands)	0–2	(Greece) Olympiacos	0–0	0–2
Benfica (Portugal)	6–2	(Northern Ireland) Linfield	3–0	3–2
Rába ETO Győr (Hungary)	4–1	(Iceland) Vikingur	2–1	2–0
Dinamo Minsk (Soviet Union)	3–2	(Switzerland) Grasshopper	1–0	2–2
Kuusysi (Finland)	0–4	(Romania) Dinamo București	0–1	0–3
Hamburg (West Germany)	(w/o)	(Albania) Vllaznia	–	–
Fenerbahçe (Turkey)	0–5	(Czechoslovakia) Bohemians Prague	0–1	0–4
Rapid Wien (Austria)	4–3	(France) Nantes	3–0	1–3
Athlone Town (Republic of Ireland)	4–11	(Belgium) Standard Liège	2–3	2–8
Ħamrun Spartans (Malta)	0–6	(Scotland) Dundee United	0–3	0–3
CSKA Sofia (Bulgaria)	4–4 (a)	(Cyprus) Omonia	3–0	1–4
Roma (Italy)	4–2	(Sweden) Gothenburg	3–0	1–2
BFC Dynamo (East Germany)	6–1	(Luxembourg) Jeunesse Esch	4–1	2–0
Partizan (Socialist Federal Republic of Yugoslavia)	5–1	(Norway) Viking	5–1	0–0

=== First leg ===
14 September 1983

Odense (Denmark)	0–1	(England) Liverpool
	Report	Dalglish 14'

Odense Stadion, Odense
Attendance: 28,000
Referee: Eysteinn Guðmundsson (Iceland)

14 September 1983

Lech Poznań (Poland)	2–0	(Spain) Athletic Bilbao
Niewiadomski 35'; Okoński 44'	Report

Stadion Miejski, Poznań
Attendance: 30,000
Referee: Einar Halle (Norway)

14 September 1983

Ajax (Netherlands)	0–0	(Greece) Olympiacos
	Report

De Meer Stadion, Amsterdam
Attendance: 20,000
Referee: Siegfried Kirschen (East Germany)

14 September 1983

Benfica (Portugal)	3–0	(Northern Ireland) Linfield
Diamantino 72'; Nené 83'; Manniche 89'	Report

Estádio da Luz, Lisbon
Attendance: 50,000
Referee: Gérard Biguet (France)

14 September 1983

Rába ETO Győr (Hungary)	2–1	(Iceland) Víkingur
Magyar 27'; Gíslason 34' (o.g.)	Report	Þorvaldsson 28'

Stadion ETO, Győr
Attendance: 9,000
Referee: George Philippides (Cyprus)

14 September 1983

Dinamo Minsk (Soviet Union)	1–0	(Switzerland) Grasshopper
Kurnenin 18'	Report

Dinamo Stadium, Minsk
Attendance: 50,000
Referee: Pietro D'Elia (Italy)

14 September 1983

Kuusysi (Finland)	0–1	(Romania) Dinamo București
	Report	Dragnea 49'

Lahden kisapuisto, Lahti
Attendance: 1,811
Referee: Ulf Eriksson (Sweden)

14 September 1983

Fenerbahçe (Turkey)	0–1	(Czechoslovakia) Bohemians Prague
	Report	V. Hruška 76'

Fenerbahçe Stadyumu, Istanbul
Attendance: 23,000
Referee: Damir Matovinović (Yugoslavia)

14 September 1983

Rapid Wien (Austria)	3–0	(France) Nantes
Panenka 18', 38'; Hagmayr 46'	Report

Gerhard-Hanappi-Stadion, Vienna
Attendance: 16,000
Referee: Neil Midgley (England)

14 September 1983

Athlone Town (Republic of Ireland)	2–3	(Belgium) Standard Liège
Collins 44'; Salmon 62'	Report	Hrubesch 12'; Vandersmissen 41'; Plessers 60' (pen.)

St. Mel's Park, Athlone
Attendance: 3,000
Referee: Albert Thomas (Netherlands)

14 September 1983

Ħamrun Spartans (Malta)	0–3	(Scotland) Dundee United
	Report	Reilly 2'; Bannon 30'; Stark 66'

Ta' Qali National Stadium, Ta' Qali
Attendance: 13,000
Referee: Berisha Şinasi (Yugoslavia)

14 September 1983

CSKA Sofia (Bulgaria)	3–0	(Cyprus) Omonia
S. Mladenov 51'; Yonchev 54'; Slavkov 60'	Report

Natsionalen Stadion Vasil Levski, Sofia
Attendance: 23,000
Referee: Lulzim Konci (Albania)

14 September 1983

Roma (Italy)	3–0	(Sweden) IFK Göteborg
Vincenzi 51'; Conti 62'; Toninho Cerezo 70'	Report

Stadio Olimpico, Rome
Attendance: 68,355
Referee: Bogdan Dochev (Bulgaria)

14 September 1983

BFC Dynamo (East Germany)	4–1	(Luxembourg) Jeunesse Esch
Götz 35'; Schulz 39'; Ernst 77'; Netz 86'	Report	Scuto 18'

Friedrich-Ludwig-Jahn-Stadion, East Berlin
Attendance: 16,500
Referee: Heikki Tuominen (Finland)

14 September 1983

Partizan (Socialist Federal Republic of Yugoslavia)	5–1	(Norway) Viking
Dimitrijević 27', 38' (pen.); Prekazi 44'; Živković 82', 87'	Report	Goodchild 36'

Stadion JNA, Belgrade
Attendance: 30,000
Referee: Franz Wöhrer (Austria)

=== Second leg ===
28 September 1983

Liverpool (England)	5–0	(Denmark) Odense
Robinson 15', 70'; Dalglish 33', 40'; Clausen 65' (o.g.)	Report

Anfield, Liverpool
Attendance: 14,985
Referee: Francis Bastian (Luxembourg)

Liverpool won 6–0 on aggregate.

28 September 1983

Athletic Bilbao (Spain)	4–0	(Poland) Lech Poznań
Goikoetxea 10'; Sola 33' (pen.); Noriega 50'; Urquiaga 84'	Report

Estadio San Mamés, Bilbao
Attendance: 45,000
Referee: Aron Schmidhuber (West Germany)

Athletic Bilbao won 4–2 on aggregate.

28 September 1983

Olympiacos (Greece)	2–0 (a.e.t.)	(Netherlands) Ajax
Anastopoulos 94', 118'	Report

OAKA Spyros Louis, Athens
Attendance: 75,000
Referee: Volker Roth (West Germany)

Olympiacos won 2–0 on aggregate.

28 September 1983

Linfield (Northern Ireland)	2–3	(Portugal) Benfica
Diamantino 29' (o.g.); Walsh 81'	Report	Strömberg 36', 75'; Diamantino 39'

Windsor Park, Belfast
Attendance: 9,133
Referee: Henning Lund-Sørensen (Denmark)

Benfica won 6–2 on aggregate.

28 September 1983

Víkingur (Iceland)	0–2	(Hungary) Rába ETO Győr
	Report	Magyar 58'; Szentes 86'

Laugardalsvöllur, Reykjavík
Attendance: 1,750
Referee: Alan Ferguson (Scotland)

Rába ETO Győr won 4–1 on aggregate.

28 September 1983

Grasshopper (Switzerland)	2–2	(Soviet Union) Dinamo Minsk
Ponte 21', 49'	Report	Kondratiev 31'; Sokol 84'

Hardturm, Zürich
Attendance: 16,000
Referee: Brian McGinlay (Scotland)

Dinamo Minsk won 3–2 on aggregate.

28 September 1983

Dinamo București (Romania)	3–0	(Finland) Kuusysi
Movilă 47'; Augustin 70'; Mulţescu 89'	Report

Stadionul Dinamo, Bucharest
Attendance: 10,000
Referee: Sotos Afxentiou (Cyprus)

Dinamo București won 4–0 on aggregate.

28 September 1983

Bohemians Prague (Czechoslovakia)	4–0	(Turkey) Fenerbahçe
Zelenský 20'; Novák 56', 86'; Chaloupka 71'	Report

Ďolíček, Prague
Attendance: 5,000
Referee: Eamonn Farrell (Republic of Ireland)

Bohemians Prague won 5–0 on aggregate.

28 September 1983

Nantes (France)	3–1	(Austria) Rapid Wien
Baronchelli 14'; Rio 15'; Muller 60' (pen.)	Report	Panenka 40'

Stade Marcel-Saupin, Nantes
Attendance: 18,789
Referee: Emilio Carlos Guruceta (Spain)

Rapid Wien won 4–3 on aggregate.

28 September 1983

Standard Liège (Belgium)	8–2	(Republic of Ireland) Athlone Town
Jelikić 1'; Delbrouck 29'; Plessers 31', 70'; Daerden 40'; Vandersmissen 47'; Tahamata 59'; Wintacq 64'	Report	Salmon 52'; Hitchcock 74'

Stade Maurice-Dufrasne, Liège
Attendance: 15,000
Referee: Jaromír Fausek (Czechoslovakia)

Standard Liège won 11–4 on aggregate.

28 September 1983

Dundee United (Scotland)	3–0	(Malta) Ħamrun Spartans
Milne 29', 46'; Kirkwood 44'	Report

Tannadice Park, Dundee
Attendance: 9,000
Referee: Jack Poucher (Northern Ireland)

Dundee United won 6–0 on aggregate.

28 September 1983

Omonia (Cyprus)	4–1	(Bulgaria) CSKA Sofia
Savvidis 42'; Arsov 48'; Kantilos 82'; G. Savva 89'	Report	Yonchev 23'

Makario Stadium, Nicosia
Attendance: 18,000
Referee: Ștefan Petrescu (Romania)

4–4 on aggregate; CSKA Sofia won on away goals.

28 September 1983

IFK Göteborg (Sweden)	2–1	(Italy) Roma
Gardner 1'; Tord Holmgren 73'	Report	Pruzzo 60'

Ullevi, Gothenburg
Attendance: 26,000
Referee: Marcel Van Langenhove (Belgium)

Roma won 4–2 on aggregate.

28 September 1983

Jeunesse Esch (Luxembourg)	0–2	(East Germany) BFC Dynamo
	Report	Ullrich 32' (pen.); Noack 50'

Stade de la Frontière, Esch-sur-Alzette
Attendance: 3,200
Referee: Jean-François Crucke (Belgium)

Dynamo Berlin won 6–1 on aggregate.

28 September 1983

Viking (Norway)	0–0	(Socialist Federal Republic of Yugoslavia) Partizan
	Report

Stavanger Stadion, Stavanger
Attendance: 2,000
Referee: Bo Helén (Sweden)

Partizan won 5–1 on aggregate.

== Second round ==
Team 1	Agg.	Team 2	1st leg	2nd leg
Liverpool (England)	1–0	(Spain) Athletic Bilbao	0–0	1–0
Olympiacos (Greece)	1–3	(Portugal) Benfica	1–0	0–3
Rába ETO Győr (Hungary)	4–9	(Soviet Union) Dinamo Minsk	3–6	1–3
Dinamo București (Romania)	5–3	(West Germany) Hamburg	3–0	2–3
Bohemians Prague (Czechoslovakia)	2–2 (a)	(Austria) Rapid Wien	2–1	0–1
Standard Liège (Belgium)	0–4	(Scotland) Dundee United	0–0	0–4
CSKA Sofia (Bulgaria)	0–2	(Italy) Roma	0–1	0–1
BFC Dynamo (East Germany)	2–1	(Socialist Federal Republic of Yugoslavia) Partizan	2–0	0–1

=== First leg ===
19 October 1983

Liverpool (England)	0–0	(Spain) Athletic Bilbao
	Report

Anfield, Liverpool
Attendance: 33,063
Referee: Paolo Bergamo (Italy)

19 October 1983

Olympiacos (Greece)	1–0	(Portugal) Benfica
Anastopoulos 21'	Report

OAKA Spyros Louis, Athens
Attendance: 75,537
Referee: Edvard Sostarić (Yugoslavia)

19 October 1983

Rába ETO Győr (Hungary)	3–6	(Soviet Union) Dinamo Minsk
Hannich 13' (pen.); Szentes 63'; Szabó 84'	Report	Sokol 3', 10', 42'; Kurnenin 20'; Gotsmanov 55'; Rumbutis 70'

Stadion ETO, Győr
Attendance: 17,000
Referee: Talat Tokat (Turkey)

19 October 1983

Dinamo București (Romania)	3–0	(West Germany) Hamburg
Augustin 29'; Mulţescu 62'; Orac 79'	Report

Stadionul 23 August, Bucharest
Attendance: 65,000
Referee: Jan Keizer (Netherlands)

19 October 1983

Bohemians Prague (Czechoslovakia)	2–1	(Austria) Rapid Wien
Janečka 26'; Němec 88'	Report	Keglevits 44'

Ďolíček, Prague
Attendance: 16,500
Referee: Bob Valentine (Scotland)

19 October 1983

Standard Liège (Belgium)	0–0	(Scotland) Dundee United
	Report

Stade Maurice-Dufrasne, Liège
Attendance: 18,000
Referee: Augusto Lamo Castillo (Spain)

19 October 1983

CSKA Sofia (Bulgaria)	0–1	(Italy) Roma
	Report	Falcão 62'

Stadion Balgarska Armia, Sofia
Attendance: 30,000
Referee: Michel Vautrot (France)

19 October 1983

BFC Dynamo (East Germany)	2–0	(Socialist Federal Republic of Yugoslavia) Partizan
Götz 1'; Ernst 37'	Report

Friedrich-Ludwig-Jahn-Stadion, East Berlin
Attendance: 19,500
Referee: Romualdas Yushka (Soviet Union)

=== Second leg ===
2 November 1983

Athletic Bilbao (Spain)	0–1	(England) Liverpool
	Report	Rush 66'

Estadio San Mamés, Bilbao
Attendance: 47,500
Referee: Adolf Prokop (East Germany)

Liverpool won 1–0 on aggregate.

2 November 1983

Benfica (Portugal)	3–0	(Greece) Olympiacos
Filipović 17'; Diamantino 28'; Manniche 76'	Report

Estádio da Luz, Lisbon
Attendance: 65,000
Referee: Neil Midgley (England)

Benfica won 3–1 on aggregate.

2 November 1983

Dinamo Minsk (Soviet Union)	3–1	(Hungary) Rába ETO Győr
Sokol 41', 60'; Kondratiev 61'	Report	Hannich 31' (pen.)

Dinamo Stadium, Minsk
Attendance: 50,050
Referee: Antonios Vassaras (Greece)

Dinamo Minsk won 9–4 on aggregate.

2 November 1983

Hamburg (West Germany)	3–2	(Romania) Dinamo București
Jakobs 45', 56' von Heesen 63'	Report	Ţălnar 86'; Mulţescu 89'

Volksparkstadion, Hamburg
Attendance: 43,700
Referee: Kjell Johansson (Sweden)

Dinamo București won 5–3 on aggregate.

2 November 1983

Rapid Wien (Austria)	1–0	(Czechoslovakia) Bohemians Prague
Krankl 6'	Report

Gerhard-Hanappi-Stadion, Vienna
Attendance: 19,400
Referee: Marcel Van Langenhove (Belgium)

2–2 on aggregate; Rapid Wien won on away goals.

2 November 1983

Dundee United (Scotland)	4–0	(Belgium) Standard Liège
Milne 26', 44'; Hegarty 51'; Dodds 68'	Report

Tannadice Park, Dundee
Attendance: 16,674
Referee: Karl-Heinz Tritschler (West Germany)

Dundee United won 4–0 on aggregate.

2 November 1983

Roma (Italy)	1–0	(Bulgaria) CSKA Sofia
Graziani 80'	Report

Stadio Olimpico, Rome
Attendance: 59,691
Referee: André Daina (Switzerland)

Roma won 2–0 on aggregate.

2 November 1983

Partizan (Socialist Federal Republic of Yugoslavia)	1–0	(East Germany) BFC Dynamo
Prekazi 27'	Report

Stadion JNA, Belgrade
Attendance: 43,425
Referee: Bogdan Dochev (Bulgaria)

Dynamo Berlin won 2–1 on aggregate.

== Quarter-finals ==
Team 1	Agg.	Team 2	1st leg	2nd leg
Liverpool (England)	5–1	(Portugal) Benfica	1–0	4–1
Dinamo Minsk (Soviet Union)	1–2	(Romania) Dinamo București	1–1	0–1
Rapid Wien (Austria)	2–2 (a)	(Scotland) Dundee United	2–1	0–1
Roma (Italy)	4–2	(East Germany) BFC Dynamo	3–0	1–2

=== First leg ===
7 March 1984

Liverpool (England)	1–0	(Portugal) Benfica
Rush 67'	Report

Anfield, Liverpool
Attendance: 39,096
Referee: Heinz Fahnler (Austria)

7 March 1984

Dinamo Minsk (Soviet Union)	1–1	(Romania) Dinamo București
Gurinovich 7'	Report	Rednic 87'

Vladimir Lenin Dinamo Stadium, Tbilisi
Attendance: 14,000
Referee: Augusto Lamo Castillo (Spain)

7 March 1984

Rapid Wien (Austria)	2–1	(Scotland) Dundee United
Hagmayr 76'; Kranjčar 86'	Report	Stark 30'

Gerhard-Hanappi-Stadion, Vienna
Attendance: 17,000
Referee: Bogdan Dochev (Bulgaria)

7 March 1984

Roma (Italy)	3–0	(East Germany) BFC Dynamo
Graziani 67'; Pruzzo 75'; Toninho Cerezo 90'	Report

Stadio Olimpico, Rome
Attendance: 61,694
Referee: Jan Keizer (Netherlands)

=== Second leg ===
21 March 1984

Benfica (Portugal)	1–4	(England) Liverpool
Nené 73'	Report	Whelan 9', 88'; Johnston 32'; Rush 78'

Estádio da Luz, Lisbon
Attendance: 66,000
Referee: Volker Roth (West Germany)

Liverpool won 5–1 on aggregate.

21 March 1984

Dinamo București (Romania)	1–0	(Soviet Union) Dinamo Minsk
Augustin 10'	Report

Stadionul 23 August, Bucharest
Attendance: 53,175
Referee: Keith Hackett (England)

Dinamo București won 2–1 on aggregate.

21 March 1984

Dundee United (Scotland)	1–0	(Austria) Rapid Wien
Dodds 21'	Report

Tannadice Park, Dundee
Attendance: 16,674
Referee: Robert Wurtz (France)

2–2 on aggregate; Dundee United won on away goals.

21 March 1984

BFC Dynamo (East Germany)	2–1	(Italy) Roma
Thom 76'; Ernst 87'	Report	Oddi 55'

Friedrich-Ludwig-Jahn-Stadion, East Berlin
Attendance: 25,000
Referee: Kjell Johansson (Sweden)

Roma won 4–2 on aggregate.

== Semi-finals ==
The tie between Roma and Dundee United was controversial; it was later alleged that Roma had bribed Michel Vautrot, the referee for the second leg.

Team 1	Agg.	Team 2	1st leg	2nd leg
Liverpool (England)	3–1	(Romania) Dinamo București	1–0	2–1
Dundee United (Scotland)	2–3	(Italy) Roma	2–0	0–3

=== First leg ===
11 April 1984

Liverpool (England)	1–0	(Romania) Dinamo București
Lee 26'	Report

Anfield, Liverpool
Attendance: 36,941
Referee: André Daina (Switzerland)

11 April 1984

Dundee United (Scotland)	2–0	(Italy) Roma
Dodds 48'; Stark 60'	Report

Tannadice Park, Dundee
Attendance: 20,543
Referee: Siegfried Kirschen (East Germany)

=== Second leg ===
25 April 1984

Dinamo București (Romania)	1–2	(England) Liverpool
Orac 39'	Report	Rush 11', 85'

Stadionul 23 August, Bucharest
Attendance: 40,213
Referee: Dieter Pauly (West Germany)

Liverpool won 3–1 on aggregate.

25 April 1984

Roma (Italy)	3–0	(Scotland) Dundee United
Pruzzo 23', 38'; Di Bartolomei 58' (pen.)	Report

Stadio Olimpico, Rome
Attendance: 68,060
Referee: Michel Vautrot (France)

Roma won 3–2 on aggregate.

== Final ==
30 May 1984

Liverpool (England)	1–1 (a.e.t.)	(Italy) Roma
Neal 13'	Report	Pruzzo 42'
Penalties
Nicol (penalty missed); Neal (penalty scored); Souness (penalty scored); Rush (penalty scored); Kennedy (penalty scored)	4–2	(penalty scored) Di Bartolomei; (penalty missed) Conti; (penalty scored) Righetti; (penalty missed) Graziani

Stadio Olimpico, Rome
Attendance: 69,693
Referee: Erik Fredriksson (Sweden)

== Top scorers ==
Rank	Name	Team	Goals
1	(Soviet Union) Viktor Sokol	(Soviet Union) Dinamo Minsk	6
2	(Italy) Roberto Pruzzo	(Italy) Roma	5
2	(Wales) Ian Rush	(England) Liverpool	5
4	(Scotland) Ralph Milne	(Scotland) Dundee United	4
5	(Greece) Nikos Anastopoulos	(Greece) Olympiacos	3
5	(Romania) Ionel Augustin	(Romania) Dinamo București	3
5	(Scotland) Kenny Dalglish	(England) Liverpool	3
5	(Portugal) Diamantino	(Portugal) Benfica	3
5	(Scotland) Davie Dodds	(Scotland) Dundee United	3
5	(East Germany) Rainer Ernst	(East Germany) BFC Dynamo	3
5	(Romania) Gheorghe Mulţescu	(Romania) Dinamo București	3
5	(Czechoslovakia) Antonín Panenka	(Austria) Rapid Wien	3
5	(Belgium) Gerard Plessers	(Belgium) Standard Liège	3
5	(Scotland) Derek Stark	(Scotland) Dundee United	3

== See also ==
- 1984 European Super Cup
- 1984 Intercontinental Cup
