= Soviet Union Olympic football team =

National football team from 1952 to 1992

Soviet Union Olympic
- Nickname: The Olympic Selection (Olimpiyskaya sbornaya) (Олимпийская сборная)
- Association: Football Federation of the Soviet Union
- Most caps: Igor Dobrovolski; Yevgeni Kuznetsov; Alexei Mikhailichenko; Dmitri Kharine; Volodymyr Troshkin (14)
- Top scorer: Igor Dobrovolski (8)
- FIFA code: URS
First colours	Second colours

First international
- Soviet Union 1–1 Bulgaria (Moscow, Russian SFSR, USSR; 27 June 1959)

Biggest win
- Soviet Union 8–0 Cuba (Moscow, Russian SFSR, USSR; 24 July 1980)

Biggest defeat
- East Germany 4–1 Soviet Union (Warsaw, Poland; 28 June 1964)

Summer Olympic Games
- Appearances: 2 (first in 1980)
- Best result: Gold Medal, 1988

Olympic medal record

Men's Football
Gold medal – first place	1956 Melbourne	Team
Gold medal – first place	1988 Seoul	Team
Bronze medal – third place	1972 Munich	Team
Bronze medal – third place	1976 Montreal	Team
Bronze medal – third place	1980 Moscow	Team

The Soviet Union Olympic football team was the national Olympic football team of the Soviet Union from 1952 to 1992. The team participated in all of the qualification football tournaments for Summer Olympics (except for 1980 when it qualified as hosts). Until 1992, when age restrictions were officially introduced, the Soviet Union used the first team both in qualification tournaments and finals except for 1960 and 1964 when the second national team was used for the qualification tournaments (the first team succeeded it in the finals in those years).

== History ==
Officially the Olympic national team was founded in 1959 after the FIFA adopted its decision in 1958 prohibiting players who played in the World Cup finals from participation in the Olympics. The Soviet Union did not participate in the World Cup until 1958 (see 1958 World Cup (qualifications)); instead, it used its first team (base team) to compete at the Olympics (since 1952) as it deemed that tournament more important. The USSR continued to use its best players in the Olympics after 1958 despite the FIFA ruling, with the branding "Olympic team" being rather formal, with all the players being part of the national team and competing both at the World Cup and Olympics.

== 1960 Olympics ==
=== Qualification ===
To defend their Olympic title at the 1960 Summer Olympics, the Soviet Union national football team had to pass through a demanding qualification process. Based on the territorial system, the team was placed in the third European qualifying group alongside Bulgaria and Romania.

This time, officials decided to form a separate Olympic squad rather than rely on the main national team. The roster consisted largely of players considered part of the reserve pool for the senior side. Among those who participated in the qualification matches, only goalkeeper Boris Razinsky had also been a member of the team that won Olympic gold in Melbourne. Boris Arkadiev was appointed head coach, while the coaching council included Mikhail Yakushin and Aleksandr Ponomarev.

The match schedule was arranged so that the Soviet team played all of its first four games early, while Bulgaria and Romania were set to face each other in the final two matches of the group.

==== 3rd Group ====
Team	Pld	W	D	L	GF	GA	GD	Pts
Bulgaria	4	2	1	1	4	3	+1	5
Soviet Union	4	1	2	1	3	2	+1	4
Romania	4	1	1	2	2	4	–2	3

==== Games ====
29 June 1959

Soviet Union	1–1	Bulgaria
Korolenkov 68'	Report	Milanov 26'

Lenin Central Stadium, Moscow
Attendance: 102,000
Referee: Bengt Lundell (Sweden)

19 July 1959

Soviet Union	2–0	Romania
Urin 10'; Metreveli 61'	Report

Lenin Central Stadium, Moscow
Attendance: 102,000
Referee: Erio Pattiniemi (Finland)

2 August 1959

Romania	0–0	Soviet Union
	[ Report]

August 23 Stadium, Bucharest
Attendance: 80,000
Referee: Grzegorz Alexandrowicz (Poland)

13 September 1959

Bulgaria	1–0	Soviet Union
Kolev 11'	[ Report]

Vasil Levski National Stadium, Sofia
Attendance: 45,000
Referee: Josef Stoll (Austria)

Bulgaria qualified for the 1960 Summer Olympics.

==== Roster ====
- Head coach: Boris Arkadyev (CSK MO Moscow)
- Coaching council staff members: Mikhail Yakushin (Dynamo Moscow) and Aleksandr Ponomarev

No.	Pos.	Player	Date of birth (age)	Caps	Goals	Club
	GK	Boris Razinsky	12 July 1933 (aged 26)	4	–2	(Football Federation of the Soviet Union) CSK MO Moscow
	DF	Dmitriy Bagrich	26 March 1936 (aged 23)	4	0	(Football Federation of the Soviet Union) CSK MO Moscow
	DF	Anatoliy Soldatov	11 July 1931 (aged 28)	3	0	(Football Federation of the Soviet Union) Spartak Moscow
	DF	Mikhail Yermolayev	4 November 1935 (aged 24)	3	0	(Football Federation of the Soviet Union) CSK MO Moscow
	DF	Nikolai Linyaev	17 July 1933 (aged 26)	3	0	(Football Federation of the Soviet Union) CSK MO Moscow
	DF	Anatoly Krutikov	21 September 1933 (aged 26)	1	0	(Football Federation of the Soviet Union) Spartak Moscow
	DF	Ivan Morgunov	1 January 1929 (aged 30)	1	0	(Football Federation of the Soviet Union) Lokomotiv Moscow
	MF	Stanislav Zavidnov	14 October 1934 (aged 25)	3	0	(Football Federation of the Soviet Union) Zenit Leningrad
	MF	Yury Kovalyov	6 February 1934 (aged 25)	3	0	(Football Federation of the Soviet Union) Lokomotiv Moscow
	MF	Boris Batanov	15 July 1934 (aged 25)	2	0	(Football Federation of the Soviet Union) Zenit Leningrad
	MF	Valery Korolenkov	17 March 1939 (aged 20)	2	1	(Football Federation of the Soviet Union) Dynamo Moscow
	MF	Aleksandr Sokolov	26 February 1930 (aged 29)	1	0	(Football Federation of the Soviet Union) Dynamo Moscow
	MF	Shota Yamanidze	15 March 1937 (aged 22)	1	0	(Football Federation of the Soviet Union) Dinamo Tbilisi
	FW	Slava Metreveli	30 March 1936 (aged 23)	4	1	(Football Federation of the Soviet Union) Torpedo Moscow
	FW	Zaur Kaloyev	24 March 1931 (aged 28)	3	0	(Football Federation of the Soviet Union) Dinamo Tbilisi
	FW	Valeri Urin	10 August 1934 (aged 25)	2	1	(Football Federation of the Soviet Union) Dynamo Moscow
	FW	Avtandil Gogoberidze	3 August 1922 (aged 37)	1	0	(Football Federation of the Soviet Union) Dinamo Tbilisi
	FW	Igor Zaitsev	21 April 1934 (aged 25)	1	0	(Football Federation of the Soviet Union) Lokomotiv Moscow
	FW	Viktor Voroshilov	15 August 1926 (aged 33)	1	0	(Football Federation of the Soviet Union) Lokomotiv Moscow
	FW	Viktor Sokolov	28 September 1936 (aged 23)	1	0	(Football Federation of the Soviet Union) Lokomotiv Moscow

Notes:

- Age on 12 December 1959.

== 1964 Olympics ==
=== Qualification ===
According to the results of the draw, the USSR national team got into the third European group of the qualifying tournament for the 1964 Olympics in Tokyo. The country was represented by the Olympic team, but in reality, the second team: the players of the first team (Glotov, Korneev, Mudrik) played together with the players of the nearest (Anichkin, Lobanovsky, Urushadze) and deep (Biba, Sevidov, Fadeev) reserve of the main team. There were no age restrictions for the players; for example, the goalkeeper Kotrikadze at the time of the first meeting with the Finns was 27 years old. The team was headed by Vyacheslav Solovyov, who combined this post with a similar job at CSKA. Assistant - E. I. Lyadin.

The tournament regulations did not provide for a group round-robin tournament. The teams had to play two-legged knockout matches. In the preliminary round, the East Germany Olympic football team knocked out the team of another Germany – West (payback for the last qualification). At the next stage, they had to challenge the Dutch, and the Soviet Union Olympic team challenged their access to the next round in the play-off with Finland.

==== Group 3 ====
===== First round =====
Team 1	Agg.	Team 2	1st leg	2nd leg
Soviet Union	11–0	Finland	7–0	4–0

22 July 1963

Soviet Union	7–0	Finland
Serebrianikov 16', 46'; Kazakov 27', 39'; Biba 38'; Matveyev 61' (pen.), 89'	Report

Tsentralny Stadion, Kiev
Attendance: 40,000
Referee: Stanislav Fenzl (Czechoslovakia)

1 August 1963

Finland	0–4	Soviet Union
	Report	Serebrianikov 23'; Biba 25'; Kazakov 48'; Matveyev 75'

Olympiastadion, Helsinki
Attendance: 6,500
Referee: Bertil Lööf (Sweden)

===== Second round =====
Team 1	Agg.	Team 2	1st leg	2nd leg
United Team of Germany	2–2	Soviet Union	1–1	1–1

31 May 1964

United Team of Germany	1–1	Soviet Union
Frenzel 10'	Report	Sevidov 88'

Zentralstadion, Leipzig
Attendance: 80,000
Referee: Joseph Heymann (Switzerland)

7 June 1964

Soviet Union	1–1	United Team of Germany
Kopayev 14'	Report	Kleiminger 62'

Tsentralny Stadion imeni Lenina, Moscow
Attendance: 82,000
Referee: Hans Karlsson (Sweden)

According to the rules of the tournament, the teams had to play the third decisive game on a neutral field. The arena for the match picked was the Warsaw Stadium of the Decade.

===== Second round third match =====
in Warsaw, Poland

Team 1	Score	Team 2
United Team of Germany	4–1	Soviet Union

28 June 1964

United Team of Germany	4–1	Soviet Union
Kleiminger 16'; Urbanczyk 39'; Vogel 82'; Fräßdorf 87'	Report	Serebrianikov 55'

Stadion Dziesięciolecia, Warsaw
Attendance: 25,000
Referee: Eduard Babauczek (Austria)

United Team of Germany qualified for the 1964 Summer Olympics.

==== Roster ====
- Head coach: Vyacheslav Solovyov (CSKA Moscow)
- Assistant: Yevgeny Lyadin

No.	Pos.	Player	Date of birth (age)	Caps	Goals	Club
	GK	Sergo Kotrikadze	9 August 1936 (aged 27)	2	0	(Football Federation of the Soviet Union) Dinamo Tbilisi
	GK	Ramaz Urushadze	17 August 1939 (aged 24)	2	–2	(Football Federation of the Soviet Union) Torpedo Kutaisi
	GK	Vladimir Lisitsin	20 August 1938 (aged 25)	1	–4	(Football Federation of the Soviet Union) Kairat Alma-Ata
	DF	Albert Shesternyov	20 June 1941 (aged 22)	5	0	(Football Federation of the Soviet Union) CSKA Moscow
	DF	Eduard Mudrik	18 July 1939 (aged 24)	4	0	(Football Federation of the Soviet Union) Dinamo Moscow
	DF	Vladimir Ponomaryov	18 February 1940 (aged 23)	3	0	(Football Federation of the Soviet Union) CSKA Moscow
	DF	Murtaz Khurtsilava	5 January 1943 (aged 20)	3	0	(Football Federation of the Soviet Union) Dinamo Tbilisi
	DF	Vladimir Glotov	23 January 1937 (aged 26)	2	0	(Football Federation of the Soviet Union) Dinamo Moscow
	DF	Viktor Anichkin	8 December 1941 (aged 22)	2	0	(Football Federation of the Soviet Union) Dinamo Moscow
	DF	Aleksei Korneyev	6 February 1939 (aged 24)	2	0	(Football Federation of the Soviet Union) Spartak Moscow
	DF	Anatoly Krutikov	21 September 1933 (aged 30)	1	0	(Football Federation of the Soviet Union) Spartak Moscow
	DF	Gennady Logofet	15 April 1942 (aged 21)	1	0	(Football Federation of the Soviet Union) Spartak Moscow
	MF	Viktor Serebryanikov	29 March 1940 (aged 23)	5	4	(Football Federation of the Soviet Union) Dinamo Kiev
	MF	Andriy Biba	10 August 1937 (aged 26)	4	2	(Football Federation of the Soviet Union) Dinamo Kiev
	MF	Valery Maslov	28 April 1940 (aged 23)	3	0	(Football Federation of the Soviet Union) Dinamo Moscow
	FW	Yury Sevidov	24 August 1942 (aged 21)	3	1	(Football Federation of the Soviet Union) Spartak Moscow
	FW	Gennadi Matveyev	22 August 1937 (aged 26)	2	3	(Football Federation of the Soviet Union) SKA Rostov-on-Don
	FW	Boris Kazakov	6 November 1940 (aged 23)	2	3	(Football Federation of the Soviet Union) Krylia Sovetov Kuibyshev
	FW	Valeriy Lobanovskyi	6 January 1939 (aged 24)	2	0	(Football Federation of the Soviet Union) Dinamo Kiev
	FW	Lev Burchalkin	9 January 1939 (aged 24)	2	0	(Football Federation of the Soviet Union) Zenit Leningrad
	FW	Eduard Malofeyev	2 June 1942 (aged 21)	1	0	(Football Federation of the Soviet Union) Dinamo Minsk
	FW	Oleg Kopayev	28 November 1937 (aged 26)	1	1	(Football Federation of the Soviet Union) SKA Rostov-on-Don
	FW	Oleg Sergeyev	30 January 1940 (aged 23)	1	0	(Football Federation of the Soviet Union) Torpedo Moscow
	FW	Valeriy Fadeyev	20 July 1939 (aged 24)	1	0	(Football Federation of the Soviet Union) Dinamo Moscow

Notes:

- Age on 31 December 1963.

== 1972 Olympics ==
=== Qualification ===
==== Play-off stage ====
Team 1	Agg.	Team 2	1st leg	2nd leg
Soviet Union	4–0	Netherlands	4–0	0–0

2 June 1971

Soviet Union	4–0	Netherlands
Kozynkevych 44', 64'; Troshkin 54'; Shalimov 74'	Report

Tsentralnyi Stadion "Dinamo", Moscow
Attendance: 23,000
Referee: Aurelio Agnonese (Italy)

16 June 1971

Netherlands	0–0	Soviet Union
	Report

Attendance: 5,000
Referee: Rudolf Scheurer (Switzerland)

==== Group 1 ====
Pos	Team	Pld	W	D	L	GF	GA	GD	Pts	Qualification	URS	FRA	AUT
1	Soviet Union	4	4	0	0	13	2	+11	**8**	1972 Summer Olympics finals	—	5–1	4–0
2	France	4	2	0	2	10	9	+1	**4**		1–3	—	5–1
3	Austria	4	0	0	4	1	13	−12	**0**		0–1	0–3	—

Source: [ FIFA]
13 October 1971

Soviet Union	4–0	Austria
Zanazanyan 13', 69'; Kozynkevych 36'; Kopeykin 87'	Report

Stadion "Druzhba", Lviv
Attendance: 21,000
Referee: Petar Kostovski (Yugoslavia)

3 November 1971

Soviet Union	5–1	France
Zanazanyan 12'; Andreasyan 21', 29'; Ishtoyan 36'; Hreshchak 51'	Report	Riefa 69'

Hrazdan Stadium, Yerevan
Attendance: 50,000
Referee: Bertil Lööw (Sweden)

18 November 1971

Austria	0–1	Soviet Union
	Report	Andreasyan 74'

Bundesstadion Südstadt, Maria Enzersdorf, Lower Austria
Attendance: 300
Referee: Franz Geluck (Belgium)

25 May 1972

France	1–3	Soviet Union
Tonnel 59'	Report	Machaidze 42'; Blokhin 49', 87'

Parc des Princes, Paris
Attendance: 22,000
Referee: David Smith (England)

==== Roster ====
In bold are players and coaches that actually went to Munich, see Olympic team squad for more information.

- Head coach: **Aleksandr Ponomarev** (away game with France Boris Nabokov)

No.	Pos.	Player	Date of birth (age)	Caps	Goals	Club
	GK	Lev Kudasov	24 June 1943 (aged 28)	1	0	(Football Federation of the Soviet Union) SKA Rostov-on-Don
	GK	Oleksandr Tkachenko	24 January 1947 (aged 25)	1	0	(Football Federation of the Soviet Union) Zaria Voroshilovgrad
	GK	Aleksandr Prokhorov	18 June 1946 (aged 25)	1	–1	(Football Federation of the Soviet Union) Dinamo Kiev
	GK	Vladimir Oleinik	10 March 1950 (aged 22)	2	–1	(Football Federation of the Soviet Union) Spartak Ordzhonikidze
	GK	**Vladimir Pilguy**	26 January 1948 (aged 24)	1	0	(Football Federation of the Soviet Union) Dinamo Moscow
	DF	Nikolay Abramov	5 January 1950 (aged 22)	1	0	(Football Federation of the Soviet Union) Spartak Moscow
	DF	Vyacheslav Bulavin	18 April 1946 (aged 26)	2	0	(Football Federation of the Soviet Union) Zenit Leningrad
	DF	Vadim Ivanov	17 January 1943 (aged 29)	2	0	(Football Federation of the Soviet Union) Spartak Moscow
	DF	Valeri Zykov	24 February 1944 (aged 28)	2	0	(Football Federation of the Soviet Union) Dinamo Moscow
	DF	Nikolai Khudiyev	15 May 1949 (aged 23)	1	0	(Football Federation of the Soviet Union) Spartak Ordzhonikidze
	DF	Sergei Dotsenko	7 September 1947 (aged 24)	1	0	(Football Federation of the Soviet Union) Dinamo Kiev
	DF	Vadym Sosnykhin	10 August 1942 (aged 29)	3	0	(Football Federation of the Soviet Union) Dinamo Kiev
	DF	Stefan Reshko	24 March 1947 (aged 25)	3	0	(Football Federation of the Soviet Union) Dinamo Kiev
	DF	Norair Mesropyan	30 April 1946 (aged 26)	3	0	(Football Federation of the Soviet Union) Ararat Yerevan
	DF	Viktor Matviyenko	26 October 1948 (aged 23)	2	0	(Football Federation of the Soviet Union) Dinamo Kiev
	DF	Boris Serostanov	17 October 1949 (aged 22)	1	0	(Football Federation of the Soviet Union) SKA Rostov-on-Don
	DF	Rostyslav Potochnyak	26 January 1948 (aged 24)	1	0	(Football Federation of the Soviet Union) Karpaty Lvov
	DF	Vladimir Golubev	16 April 1950 (aged 22)	1	0	(Football Federation of the Soviet Union) Zenit Leningrad
	DF	Viktor Zvyahintsev	22 October 1950 (aged 21)	1	0	(Football Federation of the Soviet Union) CSKA Moscow
	MF	Serhiy Bondarenko	9 November 1948 (aged 23)	4	0	(Football Federation of the Soviet Union) Ararat Yerevan
	MF	Volodymyr Troshkin	28 September 1947 (aged 24)	5	1	(Football Federation of the Soviet Union) Dinamo Kiev
	MF	Volodymyr Veremeyev	8 November 1948 (aged 23)	4	0	(Football Federation of the Soviet Union) Dinamo Kiev
	MF	Manuchar Machaidze	25 March 1949 (aged 23)	2	1	(Football Federation of the Soviet Union) Dinamo Tbilisi
	MF	Leonid Buryak	10 July 1953 (aged 18)	1	0	(Football Federation of the Soviet Union) Chernomorets Odessa
	MF	Khasan Mirikov	3 June 1950 (aged 21)	1	0	(Football Federation of the Soviet Union) Neftianik Baku
	MF	**Arkady Andreasyan**	11 August 1947 (aged 24)	5	3	(Football Federation of the Soviet Union) Ararat Yerevan
	MF	**Oganes Zanazanyan**	10 December 1946 (aged 25)	6	3	(Football Federation of the Soviet Union) Ararat Yerevan
	FW	Vladimir Goncharov	21 November 1946 (aged 25)	1	0	(Football Federation of the Soviet Union) Zenit Leningrad
	FW	Gennadiy Shalimov	29 November 1947 (aged 24)	2	1	(Football Federation of the Soviet Union) Torpedo Moscow
	FW	Eduard Kozynkevych	23 May 1949 (aged 23)	4	3	(Football Federation of the Soviet Union) Karpaty Lvov
	FW	Yuri Avrutskiy	10 May 1944 (aged 28)	2	0	(Football Federation of the Soviet Union) Dinamo Moscow
	FW	Boris Kopeykin	27 March 1946 (aged 26)	2	1	(Football Federation of the Soviet Union) CSKA Moscow
	FW	Bohdan Hreshchak	31 March 1949 (aged 23)	3	1	(Football Federation of the Soviet Union) Karpaty Lvov
	FW	Levon Ishtoyan	3 September 1947 (aged 24)	1	1	(Football Federation of the Soviet Union) Ararat Yerevan
	FW	Anatoliy Vasilyev	25 August 1944 (aged 27)	1	0	(Football Federation of the Soviet Union) Dinamo Minsk
	FW	Givi Nodia	2 January 1948 (aged 24)	1	0	(Football Federation of the Soviet Union) Dinamo Tbilisi
	FW	Vladimir Gutsaev	21 December 1952 (aged 19)	1	0	(Football Federation of the Soviet Union) Dinamo Tbilisi
	FW	**Oleh Blokhin**	5 November 1952 (aged 19)	1	2	(Football Federation of the Soviet Union) Dinamo Kiev

Notes:

- Age on 31 May 1972.

== 1976 Olympics ==
=== Qualification ===
==== Preliminary stage ====
Team 1	Agg.	Team 2	1st leg	2nd leg
Yugoslavia	1–4	Soviet Union	1–1	0–3

7 May 1975

Yugoslavia	1–1	Soviet Union
Eftić 76'	Report	Bulgakov 78'

Gradski stadion, Banja Luka
Attendance: 8,000
Referee: Erich Linemayr (Austria)

21 May 1975

Soviet Union	3–0	Yugoslavia
Buryak 57' (pen.), 61'; Hatzipanagis 87'	Report

Tsentralnyi stadion imeni V.I.Lenina, Moscow
Attendance: 40,000
Referee: Constantin Petrea (Romania)

==== Group 1 ====
Pos	Team	Pld	W	D	L	GF	GA	GD	Pts	Qualification	URS	NOR	ISL
1	Soviet Union	4	4	0	0	10	1	+9	**8**	1976 Summer Olympics finals	—	4–0	1–0
2	Norway	4	1	1	2	5	10	−5	**3**		1–3	—	3–2
3	Iceland	4	0	1	3	3	7	−4	**1**		0–2	1–1	—

Source: [ FIFA]
30 July 1975

Iceland	0–2	Soviet Union
	Report	Minayev 53', 76'

Laugardalsvöllur, Reykjavík
Attendance: 9,666
Referee: John Gordon (Scotland)

28 August 1975

Norway	1–3	Soviet Union
Skuseth 14'	Report	Sakharov 7', 52'; Fyodorov 8'

Ullevaal, Oslo
Attendance: 15,790
Referee: Georg Krutelew (Finland)

10 September 1975

Soviet Union	1–0	Iceland
Minayev 40'	Report

Tsentralnyi imeni Lenina, Moscow
Attendance: 30,000
Referee: László Hámori (Hungary)

24 November 1975

Soviet Union	4–0	Norway
Sakharov 67'; Kipiani 76', 86'; Minayev 79'	Report

Tsentralnyi imeni Lenina, Moscow
Attendance: 9,137
Referee: Marian Kustoń (Poland)

==== Roster ====
In bold are players and coaches that actually went to Montreal, see Olympic team squad for more information.

- Head coach: Konstantin Beskov

No.	Pos.	Player	Date of birth (age)	Caps	Goals	Club
	GK	**Aleksandr Prokhorov**	18 June 1946 (aged 29)	5	–2	(Football Federation of the Soviet Union) Spartak Moscow
	GK	**Vladimir Astapovsky**	16 July 1946 (aged 29)	1	0	(Football Federation of the Soviet Union) CSKA Moscow
	DF	Nikolai Khudiyev	15 May 1949 (aged 26)	1	0	(Football Federation of the Soviet Union) CSKA Moscow
	DF	Sergei Olshansky	28 May 1948 (aged 27)	2	0	(Football Federation of the Soviet Union) Spartak Moscow
	DF	Nikolai Osyanin	12 December 1941 (aged 34)	5	0	(Football Federation of the Soviet Union) Spartak Moscow
	DF	Evgeny Lovchev	29 January 1949 (aged 26)	6	0	(Football Federation of the Soviet Union) Spartak Moscow
	DF	Valentin Utkin	2 March 1947 (aged 28)	4	0	(Football Federation of the Soviet Union) CSKA Moscow
	DF	Sergei Nikulin	1 January 1951 (aged 24)	1	0	(Football Federation of the Soviet Union) Dinamo Moscow
	DF	Yuri Saukh	14 September 1951 (aged 24)	1	0	(Football Federation of the Soviet Union) SKA Rostov-on-Don
	DF	**Volodymyr Troshkin**	28 September 1947 (aged 28)	4	0	(Football Federation of the Soviet Union) Dinamo Kiev
	DF	**Viktor Zvyahintsev**	22 October 1950 (aged 25)	4	0	(Football Federation of the Soviet Union) Dinamo Kiev
	MF	Viktor Papayev	2 March 1947 (aged 28)	1	0	(Football Federation of the Soviet Union) Spartak Moscow
	MF	Mikhail Bulgakov	12 October 1951 (aged 24)	2	1	(Football Federation of the Soviet Union) Spartak Moscow
	MF	Manuchar Machaidze	25 March 1949 (aged 26)	2	0	(Football Federation of the Soviet Union) Dinamo Tbilisi
	MF	Aleksandr Maksimenkov	17 August 1952 (aged 23)	6	0	(Football Federation of the Soviet Union) Torpedo Moscow
	MF	Valeri Gladilin	19 October 1951 (aged 24)	3	0	(Football Federation of the Soviet Union) Spartak Moscow
	MF	Valeri Filatov	18 November 1950 (aged 25)	2	0	(Football Federation of the Soviet Union) Torpedo Moscow
	MF	**David Kipiani**	18 November 1951 (aged 24)	2	2	(Football Federation of the Soviet Union) Dinamo Tbilisi
	MF	**Aleksandr Minayev**	11 August 1954 (aged 21)	6	4	(Football Federation of the Soviet Union) Dynamo Moscow
	MF	**Leonid Buryak**	10 July 1953 (aged 22)	3	2	(Football Federation of the Soviet Union) Dynamo Kyiv
	FW	Vadim Nikonov	9 August 1948 (aged 27)	1	0	(Football Federation of the Soviet Union) Torpedo Moscow
	FW	Vasilis Hatzipanagis	26 October 1954 (aged 21)	4	1	(Football Federation of the Soviet Union) Pakhtakor Tashkent
	FW	Vladimir Sakharov	5 February 1948 (aged 27)	3	3	(Football Federation of the Soviet Union) Torpedo Moscow
	FW	**Vladimir Fyodorov**	5 January 1955 (aged 20)	3	1	(Football Federation of the Soviet Union) Pakhtakor Tashkent

Notes:

- Age on 31 December 1975.

== 1980 Olympics ==
=== Final tournament ===
==== First round ====
Group A

Team	Pld	W	D	L	GF	GA	GD	Pts
Soviet Union	3	3	0	0	15	1	+14	6
Cuba	3	2	0	1	3	9	−6	4
Venezuela	3	1	0	2	3	7	−4	2
Zambia	3	0	0	3	2	6	−4	0

Source: FIFA
20 July 1980
12:00

Soviet Union	4–0	Venezuela
Andreyev 3'; Cherenkov 25'; Gavrilov 34'; Hovhannisyan 51'	Report

Tsentralnyi imeni Lenina, Moscow
Attendance: 80,000
Referee: Franz Woehrer (Austria)

22 July 1980
12:00

Soviet Union	3–1	Zambia
Khidiyatullin 9', 51'; Cherenkov 87'	Report	Chitalu 13'

Tsentralnyi imeni Lenina, Moscow
Attendance: 80,000
Referee: Marwan Arafat (Syria)

24 July 1980
12:00

Soviet Union	8–0	Cuba
Andreyev 8', 27', 44'; Romantsev 20'; Shavlo 43'; Cherenkov 55'; Gavrilov 75'; Bessonov 77'	Report

Tsentralnyi Dinamo, Moscow
Attendance: 52,000
Referee: Bob Valentine (Great Britain)

==== Quarter-finals ====
27 July 1980
12:00

Soviet Union	2–1	Kuwait
Cherenkov 30'; Gavrilov 51'	Report	Yaqoub 59'

Tsentralnyi Dinamo, Moscow
Attendance: 48,000
Referee: Mario Rubio Vázquez (Mexico)

==== Semi-finals ====
29 July 1980
12:00

Soviet Union	0–1	East Germany
	Report	Netz 16'

Tsentralnyi imeni Lenina, Moscow
Attendance: 95,000
Referee: Ulf Eriksson (Sweden)

==== Bronze Medal match ====
1 August 1980
12:00

Soviet Union	2–0	Yugoslavia
Hovhannisyan 67'; Andreyev 82'	Report

Tsentralnyi Dinamo, Moscow
Attendance: 45,000
Referee: Bob Valentine (Great Britain)

==== Roster ====
Head coach: Konstantin Beskov

No.	Pos.	Player	DoB	Age	Caps	Club	Tournament games	Tournament goals	Minutes played	Sub off	Sub on	Cards yellow/red
1	GK	Rinat Dasaev	13 June 1957	22	7	(Soviet Union) Spartak Moscow	6	0	514	1	0	0
2	DF	Tengiz Sulakvelidze	27 July 1956	23	4	(Soviet Union) Dynamo Tbilisi	6	0	540	0	0	1Y
3	DF	Aleksandr Chivadze	8 April 1955	25	4	(Soviet Union) Dynamo Tbilisi	6	0	540	0	0	1Y
4	DF	Vagiz Khidiyatullin	3 March 1959	21	21	(Soviet Union) Spartak Moscow	6	0	540	0	0	0
5	DF	Oleg Romantsev	4 January 1954	26	5	(Soviet Union) Spartak Moscow	6	1	540	0	0	2Y
6	MD	Sergei Shavlo	4 September 1956	23	10	(Soviet Union) Spartak Moscow	5	1	450	0	0	0
7	MD	Sergei Andreev	17 May 1956	24	7	(Soviet Union) SKA Rostov-on-Don	6	5	540	0	0	0
8	MD	Volodymyr Bezsonov	5 March 1958	22	24	(Soviet Union) Dynamo Kiev	6	1	540	0	0	0
9	FW	Yuri Gavrilov	3 May 1953	27	15	(Soviet Union) Spartak Moscow	5	3	387	2	0	0
10	FW	Fedor Cherenkov	25 July 1959	20	6	(Soviet Union) Spartak Moscow	6	4	432	2	1	0
11	FW	Valery Gazzaev	8 August 1954	25	7	(Soviet Union) Dynamo Moscow	6	0	372	2	1	0
12	GK	Vladimir Pilguy	26 January 1948	32	12	(Soviet Union) Dynamo Moscow	1	0	26	0	1	0
13	DF	Sergei Baltacha	3 March 1958	22	1	(Soviet Union) Dynamo Kiev	2	0	108	0	1	0
14	DF	Sergei Nikulin	1 January 1951	29	3	(Soviet Union) Dynamo Moscow	1	0	45	0	1	0
15	MD	Khoren Hovhannisyan	10 January 1955	25	7	(Soviet Union) Ararat Yerevan	3	2	143	0	3	0
16	MD	Aleksandr Prokopenko	16 November 1953	26	1	(Soviet Union) Dinamo Minsk	2	0	117	0	1	0
17	FW	Revaz Chelebadze	2 October 1955	24	7	(Soviet Union) Dynamo Tbilisi	2	0	108	2	0	0

== 1984 Olympics ==
=== Qualification ===
==== Group 1 ====
Pos	Team	Pld	W	D	L	GF	GA	GD	Pts	Qualification	URS	HUN	BUL	GRE	TUR
1	Soviet Union	6	3	2	1	9	4	+5	8	withdrew from final tournament	—	0–1	0–0	3–0	—
2	Hungary	6	3	2	1	8	5	+3	8		0–1	—	1–1	3–1	—
3	Bulgaria	6	1	5	0	7	5	+2	7		2–2	1–1	—	0–0	—
4	Greece	6	0	1	5	4	14	−10	1		1–3	1–2	1–3	—	—
5	Turkey	0	—	—	—	—	—	—	0	withdrew	—	—	—	—	—

Source: [ FIFA]
18 May 1983

Bulgaria	2–2	Soviet Union
Yordanov 53'; Valchev 66'	Report	Gazzayev 16', 82'

9ti Semptevri, Plovdiv
Attendance: 22,000
Referee: Paolo Bergamo (Italy)

26 May 1983

Soviet Union	3–0	Greece
Grachev 9'; Aleynikov 29'; Larionov 9'	[ Report]

Tsentralnyi imeni Lenina, Moscow
Attendance: 21,600
Referee: Osmo Orankangas (Finland)

7 September 1983

Hungary	0–1	Soviet Union
	[ Report]	Cherenkov 89'

Népstadion, Budapest
Attendance: 34,000
Referee: Michel Vautrot (France)

5 October 1983

Greece	1–3	Soviet Union
Mitsibonas 74'	[ Report]	Kuznetsov 29'; Cherenkov 84'; Klementyev 90'

Olympiakó, Athens
Attendance: 26,000
Referee: André Daina (Switzerland)

12 October 1983

Soviet Union	0–0	Bulgaria
	[ Report]

Tsentralnyi Dynamo, Moscow
Attendance: 14,000
Referee: Volker Roth (West Germany)

25 April 1984

Soviet Union	0–1	Hungary
	[ Report]	Mészáros 76'

Tsentralnyi imeni Lenina, Moscow
Attendance: 35,000
Referee: Jan Keizer (Netherlands)

==== Roster ====
- Head coach: Eduard Malofeyev (first 2 games in May of 1983 Vladimir Salkov)

No.	Pos.	Player	Date of birth (age)	Caps	Goals	Club
	GK	Vyacheslav Chanov	23 October 1951 (aged 32)	5	–3	(Football Federation of the Soviet Union) Torpedo Moscow
	GK	Valeri Novikov	1 November 1957 (aged 26)	1	–1	(Football Federation of the Soviet Union) CSKA Moscow
	DF	Viktor Yanushevsky	23 January 1960 (aged 24)	4	0	(Football Federation of the Soviet Union) Dinamo Minsk
	DF	Vasili Zhupikov	16 January 1954 (aged 30)	4	0	(Football Federation of the Soviet Union) FC Torpedo Moscow
	DF	Viktor Shishkin	8 February 1955 (aged 29)	4	0	(Football Federation of the Soviet Union) Dinamo Minsk
	DF	Yevgeny Mileshkin	3 September 1960 (aged 23)	3	0	(Football Federation of the Soviet Union) Spartak Moscow → Dynamo Moscow
	DF	Boris Pozdnyakov	31 May 1962 (aged 22)	3	0	(Football Federation of the Soviet Union) Spartak Moscow
	DF	Mustafa Belyalov	4 June 1957 (aged 26)	2	0	(Football Federation of the Soviet Union) Pakhtakor Tashkent
	DF	Oleksandr Sorokalet	16 April 1957 (aged 27)	2	0	(Football Federation of the Soviet Union) Dinamo Kiev → Zorya Voroshilovgrad
	DF	Sergei Vedeneyev	5 August 1957 (aged 26)	1	0	(Football Federation of the Soviet Union) Zenit Leningrad
	DF	Sashik Keropyan	26 May 1956 (aged 28)	1	0	(Football Federation of the Soviet Union) Ararat Yerevan
	DF	Viktor Kaplun	5 May 1958 (aged 26)	1	0	(Football Federation of the Soviet Union) Metalist Kharkiv
	DF	Nikolay Larionov	19 January 1957 (aged 27)	1	1	(Football Federation of the Soviet Union) Zenit Leningrad
	DF	Valdas Kasparavičius	17 January 1958 (aged 26)	1	0	(Football Federation of the Soviet Union) Žalgiris Vilnius
	DF	Andrei Zygmantovich	2 December 1962 (aged 21)	1	0	(Football Federation of the Soviet Union) Dinamo Minsk
	DF	Yuri Pudyshev	3 April 1954 (aged 30)	1	0	(Football Federation of the Soviet Union) Dinamo Minsk
	MF	Sergey Gotsmanov	27 March 1959 (aged 25)	6	0	(Football Federation of the Soviet Union) Dinamo Minsk
	MF	Sergei Aleinikov	7 November 1961 (aged 22)	4	1	(Football Federation of the Soviet Union) Dinamo Minsk
	MF	Fyodor Cherenkov	25 July 1959 (aged 24)	4	2	(Football Federation of the Soviet Union) Spartak Moscow
	MF	Vyacheslav Melnikov	7 March 1954 (aged 30)	3	0	(Football Federation of the Soviet Union) Zenit Leningrad
	MF	Yevgeni Kuznetsov	10 July 1953 (aged 30)	3	1	(Football Federation of the Soviet Union) Spartak Moscow
	MF	Viktor Kuznetsov	8 January 1961 (aged 23)	2	0	(Football Federation of the Soviet Union) Dnipro Dnipropetrovsk
	MF	Hennadiy Lytovchenko	11 September 1963 (aged 20)	2	0	(Football Federation of the Soviet Union) Dnipro Dnipropetrovsk
	MF	Yuri Zheludkov	8 March 1959 (aged 25)	1	0	(Football Federation of the Soviet Union) Zenit Leningrad
	FW	Viktor Hrachov	17 September 1956 (aged 27)	6	1	(Football Federation of the Soviet Union) Shakhtar Donetsk
	FW	Valery Gazzaev	7 August 1954 (aged 29)	5	2	(Football Federation of the Soviet Union) Dynamo Moscow
	FW	Igor Belanov	25 September 1960 (aged 23)	2	0	(Football Federation of the Soviet Union) Chornomorets Odesa
	FW	Vladimir Klementyev	4 January 1956 (aged 28)	2	1	(Football Federation of the Soviet Union) Zenit Leningrad
	FW	Ihar Hurynovich	5 March 1960 (aged 24)	1	0	(Football Federation of the Soviet Union) Dinamo Minsk
	FW	Sergei Stukashov	12 November 1959 (aged 24)	1	0	(Football Federation of the Soviet Union) Kairat Almaty

Notes:

- Age on 31 May 1984.

== 1988 Olympics ==
=== Qualification ===
==== Group D ====
Pos	Team	Pld	W	D	L	GF	GA	GD	Pts	Qualification	URS	BUL	SUI	NOR	TUR
1	Soviet Union	8	6	2	0	12	2	+10	14	1988 Summer Olympics finals	—	2–0	0–0	1–0	2–0
2	Bulgaria	8	4	2	2	13	5	+8	10		0–1	—	2–0	4–0	3–1
3	Switzerland	8	2	3	3	8	10	−2	7		2–4	1–1	—	1–0	2–0
4	Norway	8	0	5	3	1	7	−6	5		0–0	0–0	0–0	—	1–1
5	Turkey	8	1	2	5	5	15	−10	4		0–2	0–3	3–2	0–0	—

Source: [ FIFA]
14 October 1986

Norway	0–0	Soviet Union
	[ Report]

Ullevaal, Oslo
Attendance: 7,500
Referee: John Kinsella (Ireland)

15 April 1987

Turkey	0–2	Soviet Union
	[ Report]	Lyutyi 23'; Dobrovolski 70'

Alsancak Mustafa Denizli, Turkezmir
Attendance: 15,000
Referee: Aron Schmidhuber (West Germany)

7 May 1987

Bulgaria	0–1	Soviet Union
	[ Report]	Mykhailychenko 63'

Natsionalen Vasil Levski, Sofia
Attendance: 12,000
Referee: Joël Quiniou (France)

12 August 1987

Soviet Union	1–0	Norway
Lyutyi 48'	Report

Tsentralnyi Dynamo, Moscow
Attendance: 18,000
Referee: Rune Larsson (Sweden)

28 October 1987

Switzerland	2–4	Soviet Union
Türkyilmaz 16'; Kundert 55'	[ Report]	Lyutyi 36'; Dobrovolski 65' (pen.); Baranauskas 79', 83'

Olympique de la Pontaise, Lausanne
Attendance: 11,000
Referee: Joe Worrall (England)

6 April 1988

Soviet Union	2–0	Turkey
Savichev 36'; Borodyuk 86'	[ Report]

Lokomotiv, Simferopol
Attendance: 23,650
Referee: Timo Keltanen (Finland)

27 April 1988

Soviet Union	2–0	Bulgaria
Mykhailychenko 41'; Kuznetsov 72'	[ Report]

Lokomotiv, Simferopol
Attendance: 23,600
Referee: David Syme (Scotland)

10 May 1988

Soviet Union	0–0	Switzerland
	[ Report]

Tsentralnyi Dynamo, Moscow
Attendance: 10,500
Referee: Gérard Biguet (France)

=== Final tournament ===
==== Group stage ====
Group C

Pos	Team	Pld	W	D	L	GF	GA	GD	Pts
1	Soviet Union	3	2	1	0	6	3	+3	5
2	Argentina	3	1	1	1	4	4	0	3
3	South Korea (H)	3	0	2	1	1	2	−1	2
4	United States	3	0	2	1	3	5	−2	2

Source: FIFA
(H) Hosts
18 September 1988

South Korea	0–0	Soviet Union
	Report

Busan Gudeok Stadium, Busan
Attendance: 30,000
Referee: Tullio Lanese (Italy)

20 September 1988

Argentina	1–2	Soviet Union
Alfaro 77'	Report	Dobrovolski 7'; Mikhailichenko 22'

Daegu Civic Stadium, Daegu
Attendance: 25,000
Referee: Gérard Biguet (France)

22 September 1988

United States	2–4	Soviet Union
Goulet 65'; Doyle 85'	Report	Mikhailichenko 7', 48'; Narbekovas 19'; Dobrovolski 45'

Daegu Civic Stadium, Daegu
Attendance: 20,000
Referee: Arnaldo Cézar Coelho (Brazil)

==== Quarter-finals ====
25 September 1988

Soviet Union	3–0	Australia
Dobrovolski 50', 54'; Mikhailichenko 62'	Report	Mitchell (red card) 70'

Busan Gudeok Stadium, Busan
Attendance: 7,000
Referee: Juan Daniel Cardellino (URU)

==== Semi-finals ====
27 September 1988

Soviet Union	3–2 (a.e.t.)	Italy
Dobrovolski 78'; Narbekovas 92'; Mikhailichenko 106'	Report	Virdis 50'; Ferrara (yellow card) 94' (yellow-red card) 96'; Carnevale 118'

Busan Gudeok Stadium, Busan
Attendance: 10,000
Referee: Jamal Al Sharif (SYR)

=== Gold medal match ===
1988 Summer Olympics Football Final
1 October 1988

Soviet Union	2–1 (a.e.t.)	Brazil
Dobrovolski 61' (pen.); Savichev 103'; Tatarchuk (yellow card) 78' (red card) 110'	Report	Romário 30'; Edmar (red card) 112'

Olympic Stadium, Seoul
Attendance: 74,000
Referee: Gérard Biguet (FRA)

=== Roster ===
- Head coach: Anatoliy Byshovets, assistants: Vladimir Salkov, Gadzhi Gadzhiyev

No.	Pos.	Player	Date of birth (age)	Caps	Goals	Club
1	GK	Dmitry Kharin	16 August 1968 (aged 20)	14	–8	(Football Federation of the Soviet Union) Torpedo Moscow → Dynamo Moscow
16	GK	Aleksei Prudnikov	20 March 1960 (aged 28)	0	0	(Football Federation of the Soviet Union) Dynamo Moscow → Torpedo Moscow
2	DF	Gela Ketashvili	27 September 1965 (aged 22)	11	0	(Football Federation of the Soviet Union) Dinamo Tbilisi
3	DF	Igor Sklyarov	31 August 1966 (aged 22)	9	0	(Football Federation of the Soviet Union) SKA Rostov-na-Donu → Dynamo Moscow
4	DF	Oleksiy Cherednyk	15 September 1960 (aged 27)	8	0	(Football Federation of the Soviet Union) Dnipro Dnipropetrovsk
5	DF	Arvydas Janonis	6 November 1960 (aged 27)	2	0	(Football Federation of the Soviet Union) Žalgiris Vilnius
12	DF	Evgeniy Yarovenko	17 August 1962 (aged 26)	9	0	(Football Federation of the Soviet Union) Kairat Alma-Ata
13	DF	Sergei Fokin	26 July 1961 (aged 27)	4	0	(Football Federation of the Soviet Union) CSKA Moscow
17	DF	Viktor Losev	25 January 1959 (aged 29)	12	0	(Football Federation of the Soviet Union) Dynamo Moscow
18	DF	Sergei Gorlukovich	18 November 1961 (aged 26)	9	0	(Football Federation of the Soviet Union) Lokomotiv Moscow
	DF	Valeri Panchik	10 July 1963 (aged 25)	1	0	(Football Federation of the Soviet Union) Neftchi Baku
	DF	Arkadiy Afanasyev	20 March 1959 (aged 29)	1	0	(Football Federation of the Soviet Union) Zenit Leningrad
	DF	Dmitri Kuznetsov	28 August 1965 (aged 23)	1	0	(Football Federation of the Soviet Union) CSKA Moscow
6	MF	Vadym Tyshchenko	24 March 1963 (aged 25)	4	0	(Football Federation of the Soviet Union) SKA Karpaty Lviv → Dnipro Dnipropetrovsk
7	MF	Yevgeni Kuznetsov	30 August 1961 (aged 27)	11	1	(Football Federation of the Soviet Union) Spartak Moscow
8	MF	Igor Ponomaryov	24 February 1960 (aged 28)	1	0	(Football Federation of the Soviet Union) Neftchi Baku
10	MF	Igor Dobrovolski	27 August 1967 (aged 21)	14	8	(Football Federation of the Soviet Union) Dynamo Moscow
15	MF	Oleksiy Mykhaylychenko	30 March 1963 (aged 25)	14	7	(Football Federation of the Soviet Union) Dynamo Kyiv
20	MF	Arminas Narbekovas	28 November 1965 (aged 22)	7	2	(Football Federation of the Soviet Union) Žalgiris Vilnius
	MF	Aleksandr Vorobyov	28 March 1962 (aged 26)	1	0	(Football Federation of the Soviet Union) SKA Rostov-na-Donu
	MF	Valeri Broshin	19 October 1962 (aged 25)	2	0	(Football Federation of the Soviet Union) CSKA Moscow
	MF	Valdas Ivanauskas	31 July 1966 (aged 22)	3	0	(Football Federation of the Soviet Union) Žalgiris Vilnius
9	FW	Aleksandr Borodyuk	30 November 1962 (aged 25)	6	1	(Football Federation of the Soviet Union) Dynamo Moscow
11	FW	Volodymyr Lyutyi	20 April 1962 (aged 26)	12	3	(Football Federation of the Soviet Union) Dnipro Dnipropetrovsk
14	FW	Vladimir Tatarchuk	25 April 1966 (aged 22)	10	0	(Football Federation of the Soviet Union) CSKA Moscow
19	FW	Yuri Savichev	13 February 1965 (aged 23)	9	2	(Football Federation of the Soviet Union) Torpedo Moscow
	FW	Oleg Morozov	13 October 1961 (aged 26)	1	0	(Football Federation of the Soviet Union) Chornomorets Odesa → Dynamo Kyiv
	FW	Sergey Dmitriyev	19 March 1964 (aged 24)	1	0	(Football Federation of the Soviet Union) Zenit Leningrad
	FW	Nikolai Savichev	13 February 1965 (aged 23)	1	0	(Football Federation of the Soviet Union) Torpedo Moscow
	FW	Stasys Baranauskas	7 May 1962 (aged 26)	2	2	(Football Federation of the Soviet Union) Žalgiris Vilnius

Notes:

- Age on 31 August 1988.

== Summer Olympics record ==
Gold medalists Silver medalists Bronze medalists

Summer Olympics										Qualification						
Year	Host	Round	Pld	W	D	L	F	A	Squad	Pos.	Pld	W	D	L	F	A
1952	Finland	See Soviet Union national football team								See Soviet Union national football team						
1956	Australia	See Soviet Union national football team								See Soviet Union national football team						
1960	Italy	Did not qualify								2nd	4	1	2	1	3	2
1964	Japan	Did not qualify								R2	5	2	2	1	14	6
1968	Mexico	See Soviet Union national football team								See Soviet Union national football team						
1972	West Germany	See Soviet Union national football team								1st	4	4	0	0	13	2
1976	Canada	See Soviet Union national football team								1st	6	5	1	0	14	2
1980	Soviet Union	Bronze medal	6	5	0	1	19	3	Squad	Qualified as hosts						
1984	United States	Withdrew								1st	6	3	2	1	9	4
1988	South Korea	Gold medal	6	5	1	0	14	6	Squad	1st	8	6	2	0	12	2
Total		Gold medal	12	10	1	1	33	9	—	5/7	33	21	9	3	65	18

== Venues ==
Venue	City		Played	Won	Drawn	Lost	GF	GA	Points per game
Central Lenin Stadium	Moscow	1959-1984	13	9	2	2	27	8	2.23
Central Dynamo Stadium	Moscow	1956-1991	9	7	2	0	24	1	2.56
Lokomotiv Stadium	Simferopol	1988-1991	3	2	1	0	5	1	2.33
Central Stadium	Kiev	1963	1	1	0	0	7	0	3
Druzhba Stadium	Lvov	1971	1	1	0	0	4	0	3
Hrazdan Stadium	Yerevan	1971	1	1	0	0	5	1	3
Central Lokomotiv Stadium	Moscow	1990	1	0	1	0	2	2	1
Totals		1956-1991	29	21	6	2	74	13	2.38

== Soviet managers ==
The list does not include games of the senior team such as participation at the Olympic tournaments finals (1952–1980).

Manager	Nation	Years	Played	Won	Drawn	Lost	GF	GA	Win %	Qualifying cycle	Final tour
Boris Arkadiev	(Soviet Union)	1959	4	1	2	1	3	2	25	1960	
Vyacheslav Solovyov	(Soviet Union)	1963-1964	5	2	2	1	14	6	40	1964	
Aleksandr Ponomarev	(Soviet Union)	1971	5	4	1	0	14	1	80	1972	1972
Konstantin Beskov	(Soviet Union)	1975	6	5	1	0	14	2	83.33	1976	1976
Konstantin Beskov	(Soviet Union)	1980	6	5	0	1	19	3	83.33		1980
Vladimir Salkov	(Soviet Union)	1983	2	1	1	0	5	2	50	1984	
Eduard Malofeyev	(Soviet Union)	1983-1984	4	2	1	1	4	2	50	1984	1984*
Anatoly Byshovets	(Soviet Union)	1986-1988	14	11	3	0	26	8	78.57	1988	1988

Notes:

- The USSR Olympic team withdrew from the football tournament at the 1984 Summer Olympics.
- Since 1991, UEFA nations qualify for the Olympics via continental under-21 tournaments.

== See also ==
- Football in the Soviet Union
- Soviet Union national football team
- Soviet Union national under-21 football team
- Soviet Union national under-19 football team
