= Ihor Zaytsev =

Ihor Zaytsev is the name of:

- Ihor Zaytsev (basketball) (born 1989), Ukrainian basketball player
- Ihor Zaytsev (footballer) (1934–2016), Ukrainian Soviet footballer
