= Vladimir Shcherbak =

Vladimir Shcherbak may refer to:

- Vladimir Shcherbak (footballer, born 1970), Russian football manager and player
- Vladimir Shcherbak (footballer, born 1959), Russian footballer
- Vladimir Shcherbak (painter) (1947–2018), Russian-Bulgarian painter
- Vladimir Shcherbak (politician) (1939–2010), Soviet and Russian CPSU functionary and politician
