= Aleksandr Prokhorov =

Aleksandr Prokhorov (Russian: Алекса́ндр Про́хоров) is a male personal name of Russian origin may refer to:

- Alexander Prokhorov (1916–2002), Soviet physicist
- Aleksandr Prokhorov (footballer) (1946–2005), Soviet international footballer
- Aleksandr Prokhorov (politician) (born 1953), Russian politician, governor of Smolensk Oblast
- Aleksandr Prokhorov (racewalker) (born 1986), Russian racewalking athlete and runner-up at the 2003 European Race Walking Cup
