= Aleksey Vergeyenko =

Belarusian footballer and coach

Personal information
- Full name: Aleksey Mikhaylovich Vergeyenko
- Date of birth: 30 March 1975 (age 51)
- Place of birth: Minsk, Belarusian SSR
- Position: Midfielder

Senior career*
Years	Team	Apps	(Gls)
1993–1994	Dinamo-Juni Minsk		
1994–1995	Hasper SV		
1995–1996	Essen		
1996	FC Marbach		
1996	Dinamo-Juni Minsk	7	(1)
1997	Molodechno	10	(0)
1998	Dinamo-Juni Minsk	23	(3)
1999	Dinamo Minsk	8	(0)
2001–2002	Torpedo-Kadino Mogilev	20	(0)

Managerial career
- 2004–2009: Shakhtyor Soligorsk (assistant)
- 2009: Shakhtyor Soligorsk
- 2010–2011: Belarus U19
- 2012–2013: Belarus U21
- 2017: Baranovichi
- 2018–2020: Molodechno
- * Club domestic league appearances and goals

Aleksey Mikhaylovich Vergeyenko (Belarusian: Аляксей Міхайлавіч Вергеенка; Russian: Алексей Михайлович Вергеенко; born 30 Match 1975) is a Belarusian professional football coach and former player. He is a son of Mikhail Vergeyenko, a former professional football coach and player.

== Coaching career ==
During 2012–2013 he was a head coach for Belarus national under-21 football team.
