= Fran Hitchcock =

Irish footballer

Personal information
- Full name: Francis Hitchcock
- Date of birth: 2 December 1960 (age 65)
- Place of birth: Dublin, Ireland
- Position: Forward

Senior career*
Years	Team	Apps	(Gls)
1980–1981	Shelbourne		
1981–1982	Home Farm	8	(2)
1981–1982	Cambuur	7	(1)
1982–1984	Athlone Town		
1984–1985	Home Farm		(14)
1985–1986	Shamrock Rovers	1	(0)
1985–1986	Home Farm		
1986–1987	Longford Town	7	(1)
1986–1987	St Patrick's Athletic	14	(1)
1987–1989	Athlone Town		
1989–1990	Dundalk		
1990–1991	Sligo Rovers	31	(2)
1991–1992	Bohemians	18	(2)
1992–1993	Sligo Rovers	21	(0)
1993–1994	Cliftonville	4	(0)
1993–1994	Limerick	17	(2)
1994–1995	Monaghan United	15	(1)
1995–1996	Home Farm Everton	21	(3)
1996–1997	St Francis	14	(1)
- * Club domestic league appearances and goals

Fran Hitchcock (born 2 December 1960) is an Irish former footballer who played as a forward during the 1980s and 1990s.

== Career ==
Hitchcock made his League of Ireland debut for Shelbourne on 7 September 1980. He can count Home Farm (four spells), Shamrock Rovers, Sligo Rovers, Dundalk and Bohemians amongst his many clubs during a long career in the League of Ireland.

Hitchcock scored for Athlone Town in the 1983–84 European Cup.

While at Home Farm his form helped him earn a Player of the Month award in December 1984.

He played twice in the European Cup for Rovers in 1985 making a total of eight appearances whilst at Glenmalure Park.

Hitchcock bought out his contract at Rovers in January 1986 to move back to Home Farm. He also played in goal for St Pats reserves.

He signed for Bohemians in October 1991.

Hitchcock scored on his debut for Cliftonville F.C.

== Sources ==
- Paul Doolan; Robert Goggins. The Hoops. ISBN 0-7171-2121-6.
- Dave Galvin; Gerry Desmond. Irish Football Handbook. ISBN 0-9517987-3-1.
