= Yury Sevidov =

Soviet footballer (1942–2010)

Personal information
- Full name: Yury Aleksandrovich Sevidov
- Date of birth: 24 August 1942
- Place of birth: Moscow, USSR
- Date of death: 11 February 2010 (aged 67)
- Place of death: Marbella, Spain
- Height: 6 ft 1 in (1.85 m)
- Position: Forward

Senior career*
| Years | Team | Apps | (Gls) |
| 1959–1960 | Zimbru Chişinău | 10 | (0) |
| 1960–1965 | Spartak Moscow | 146 | (71) |
| 1970–1971 | Kairat | 63 | (22) |
| 1972 | Karpaty Lviv | 0 | (0) |
| 1972 | Shakhtar Donetsk | 16 | (7) |
| 1974 | Spartak Ryazan | 5 | (0) |
| Total | | 240 | (100) |

International career
| 1964 | Soviet Union Olympic | 3 | (1) |

Managerial career
- 1975–1977: FShM Torpedo Moscow
- 1978–1979: Dynamo Vologda
- 1980–1981: Spartak Ryazan
- 1984: Shinnik Yaroslavl
- 1985: Dynamo Makhachkala
- 1987: Neftchi Baku
- 1997: "Magnesite" Satka
- 1998: "Patriot" Moscow
- * Club domestic league appearances and goals

Yuri Aleksandrovich Sevidov (Russian: Юрий Александрович Севидов; 24 August 1942 – 11 February 2010) was a Soviet footballer who played as a forward.

== Career ==
Born in Moscow, the son of the famous Soviet football player and manager, Aleksandr Sevidov, Yuri began playing professional football with Spartak Moscow at age 18. Sevidov twice won the Soviet Cup (in 1963 and 1965) and the Soviet Top League (in 1962, when he scored 16 league goals).

He was the best bombardier of 1962 Soviet championship. He is gold champion of USSR in 1962 and bronze medalist in 1961.

== Imprisonment ==
On 18 September 1965, Sevidov had a hit-and-run accident, resulting in a death of a 60-year-old pedestrian, who happened to be Dmitriy Ivanovich Ryabchikov, a prominent Soviet chemist with the Doctor of Science degree and membership in the Russian Academy of Sciences. Sevidov was charged with vehicular manslaughter and sentenced to 10 years in prison. He was paroled in 1969.

He was the second high-profile Soviet football player to have been imprisoned while in the prime of his career after Eduard Streltsov, whose case happened seven years earlier.

== After retirement ==
In later years, Sevidov worked as a columnist for the Soviet sport and often acted as an expert in sports programs on TV.

== Death ==
On 11 February 2010, Sevidov died during a business trip in Marbella, Spain.
