= Viktor Sokol (footballer, born 1954) =

Soviet and Belarusian footballer and manager

Personal information
- Full name: Viktor Petrovich Sokol
- Date of birth: 5 December 1954 (age 71)
- Place of birth: Minsk, Belarus, USSR
- Height: 1.78 m (5 ft 10 in)
- Position: Forward

Senior career*
| Years | Team | Apps | (Gls) |
| 1978–1979 | Dinamo Brest | 69 | (13) |
| 1979–1991 | Dinamo Minsk | 261 | (48) |
| 1991–1992 | Jagiellonia Białystok | 17 | (8) |
| 1992 | Belarus Minsk | 3 | (1) |

Managerial career
- 1994–1996: Dinamo-93 Minsk
- 2001: Dinamo-Juni Minsk
- 2001–2002: Dinamo Brest
- 2003: Belarus (assistant)
- 2003–2004: Belarus U19 (assistant)
- 2007: Minsk-2
- 2011: Rudensk
- * Club domestic league appearances and goals

Viktor Petrovich Sokol (Belarusian: Вiктар Пятровіч Сокал, Russian: Виктор Петрович Сокол; born 5 December 1954) is a retired Soviet and Belarusian football player and currently a manager. His son, who is also named Viktor Sokol is also a professional footballer.

== Honours ==
Dinamo Minsk

- Soviet Top League winner: 1982.

Individual

- European Cup top scorer: 1983–84.
