= Aleksandr Prokhorov (footballer) =

Soviet footballer

Personal information
- Full name: Aleksandr Vladimirovich Prokhorov
- Date of birth: June 18, 1946
- Place of birth: Brest, Belarusian SSR
- Date of death: January 7, 2005 (aged 58)
- Place of death: Moscow, Russia
- Height: 1.76 m (5 ft 9 1/2 in)
- Position: Goalkeeper

Youth career
- 1965: Dinamo Minsk

Senior career*
Years	Team	Apps	(Gls)
1965	Neman Grodno	29	(0)
1966–1967	Dinamo Minsk	11	(0)
1968–1969	Metalurh Zaporizhya	60	(0)
1970–1971	Dynamo Kyiv	18	(0)
1972–1975	Spartak Moscow	91	(0)
1976	Dynamo Kyiv	1	(0)
1976–1978	Spartak Moscow	51	(0)
1978	Krasnaya Presnya Moscow	10	(0)
Total		271	(0)

International career
1971–1976	Soviet Union Olympic	6	(0)
1976	Soviet Union	3	(0)

Managerial career
- 1979–1980: Avangard Petropavlovsk
- 1981: Meliorator Kyzylorda
- 1981: Shakhter Karagandy (assistant)
- 1982: Meliorator Kyzylorda
- 1983–1984: Shakhter Karagandy (assistant)
- 1985: Tselinnik Tselinograd
- 1988–1989: Olimpiyets football school
- 1990–1991: USSR Football Veterans (administrator)
- 1992–1995: MFC Norovus Moscow (director)
- 1996–2005: Russia Football Veterans (director)
- * Club domestic league appearances and goals

Aleksandr Vladimirovich Prokhorov (Russian: Александр Владимирович Прохоров; June 18, 1946 – January 7, 2005) was a Soviet football player and coach.

== Honours ==
Dynamo Kyiv

- Soviet Top League champion: 1971

Individual

- Soviet Goalkeeper of the Year: 1974, 1975

== International career ==
Prokhorov made his debut for USSR on March 20, 1976, in a friendly against Argentina. He played in the UEFA Euro 1976 quarterfinal (USSR did not qualify for the final tournament).
