= Yury Kurbyko =

Belarusian footballer

Personal information
- Date of birth: 26 February 1956 (age 70)
- Place of birth: Minsk, Belarusian SSR
- Height: 1.88 m (6 ft 2 in)
- Position: Goalkeeper

Youth career
- 1974–1975: Dinamo Minsk

Senior career*
| Years | Team | Apps | (Gls) |
| 1974–1985 | Dinamo Minsk | 123 | (0) |
| 1987–1988 | Pakhtakor Tashkent | 41 | (0) |
| 1988–1992 | Dinamo Minsk | 61 | (0) |

International career
| 1992 | Belarus B | 1 | (0) |
- * Club domestic league appearances and goals

Yury Kurbyko (Belarusian: Юрый Курбыка; Russian: Юрий Курбыко; born 26 February 1956) is a retired Belarusian professional football player. He spent his playing career in Dinamo Minsk and Pakhtakor Tashkent.

In 1991, he was named a Belarusian Footballer of the Year coming only second after Viktor Hryshko in the most "clean sheets" matches run-up. After retirement he started his own business and worked for Football Federation of Belarus.

== Honours ==
Dinamo Minsk

- Soviet Top League champion: 1982
- Belarusian Premier League champion: 1992, 1992–93
- Belarusian Cup winner: 1992

Individual

- Belarusian Footballer of the Year: 1991
