= Ihor Zaytsev (footballer) =

Russian footballer

Personal information
- Full name: Ihor Ivanovych Zaytsev
- Date of birth: 21 April 1934
- Place of birth: Moscow, Russian SFSR
- Date of death: 27 January 2016 (aged 81)
- Place of death: Kyiv, Ukraine
- Height: 1.76 m (5 ft 9 in)
- Position: Striker

Youth career
- 1952–1953: FC Krylya Sovietov Stupino

Senior career*
Years	Team	Apps	(Gls)
1954–1955	CDSA Moscow	0	(0)
1955–1956	SKA Lviv	?	(?)
1957–1959	FC Lokomotiv Moscow	63	(14)
1960–1961	FC Dynamo Kyiv	23	(1)
1961–1962	FC Shakhtar Donetsk	6	(0)
1962	FC Avanhard Ternopil	?	(?)
1963–1964	FC Spartak Ivano-Frankivsk	?	(?)

International career
1957–1959	USSR (Olympic)	3	(0)
- * Club domestic league appearances and goals

Ihor Ivanovych Zaytsev (Ukrainian: Ігор Іванович Зайцев; Russian: Игорь Иванович Зайцев; 21 April 1934 – 27 January 2016) was a football striker.

== Career ==
Born in Moscow, Zaytsev spent his career as player for a number of different Soviet football clubs, including Lokomotiv Moscow, Dynamo Kyiv, Shakhtar Donetsk and Avanhard Ternopil. After his retirement from football at age 30, Zaytsev worked as a hairdresser. In 2015, he lived in Kyiv. He died in 2016, aged 81.

== Awards and honours ==
Awards

- USSR Premier League runner-up: 1959
- USSR Cup: 1957
