= Roy Walsh (footballer) =

English footballer

Personal information
- Full name: Roy William Walsh
- Date of birth: 15 January 1947 (age 79)
- Place of birth: Dedham, England
- Position: Inside forward

Youth career
- 1962–1965: Ipswich Town

Senior career*
Years	Team	Apps	(Gls)
1965–1967	Ipswich Town	7	(0)
1967	Southend United	0	(0)
1967–1968	Chelmsford City	16	(3)
1968–1969	Cambridge City		
- Haverhill Rovers
- Dedham Old Boys

Managerial career
- Dedham Old Boys
- * Club domestic league appearances and goals

Roy William Walsh (born 15 January 1947) is an English former footballer who played as an inside forward.

== Career ==
In 1962, Walsh joined Ipswich Town as an apprentice. In 1965, Walsh signed professional forms with Ipswich. During his time at the club, Walsh made nine appearances in all competitions for Ipswich, all coming in the 1965–66 season. In 1967, Walsh signed for Southend United. Following a short spell at Southend, Walsh signed for Chelmsford City. Following his time at Chelmsford, Walsh signed for Cambridge City, before joining Haverhill Rovers in 1969. Walsh later played for, and managed, hometown club Dedham Old Boys.
