= Frank Klausen =

Danish footballer (1960–2005)

Personal information
- Date of birth: 30 June 1960
- Place of birth: Odense, Denmark
- Date of death: 9 February 2005 (aged 44)
- Position: Defender

Senior career*
Years	Team	Apps	(Gls)
1979–1989	Odense Boldklub		

International career
1977–1978	Denmark U19	10	(0)
1983	Denmark	4	(0)
- * Club domestic league appearances and goals

Frank Klausen (30 June 1960 – 9 February 2005) was a Danish footballer who played as a defender for Odense Boldklub. He made four appearances for the Denmark national team in 1983.
