= Andrei Zygmantovich =

Belarusian footballer and coach

Andrey Zyhmantovich Andrei Zygmantovich
Personal information
- Full name: Andrei Vikentyevich Zygmantovich
- Date of birth: 2 December 1962 (age 63)
- Place of birth: Minsk, Soviet Union
- Height: 1.85 m (6 ft 1 in)
- Positions: Defender; midfielder

Senior career*
Years	Team	Apps	(Gls)
1981–1991	Dinamo Minsk	262	(20)
1991–1992	Groningen	29	(2)
1992	Dinamo Minsk	8	(0)
1993–1996	Racing Santander	87	(1)
Total		386	(23)

International career
1984	USSR Olympic	1	(0)
1984–1990	USSR	36	(3)
1992–1995	Belarus	9	(0)

Managerial career
- 2001: Naftan Novopolotsk
- 2002: Dinamo Minsk
- 2003–2004: Belarus U18
- 2004–2007: Belarus U19
- 2007: MTZ-RIPO Minsk
- 2007–2008: FBK Kaunas (assistant)
- 2008: FBK Kaunas
- 2008: FBK Kaunas (assistant)
- 2010: Sibir Novosibirsk (youth)
- 2011–2012: Sibir-2 Novosibirsk
- 2012–2014: Belarus (assistant)
- 2014: Belarus (caretaker)
- 2016–2017: Torpedo-BelAZ Zhodino (assistant)
- 2017–2019: Rukh Brest
- 2020–2022: Belarus U19
- * Club domestic league appearances and goals

Andrei Vikentyevich Zygmantovich or Andrey Zyhmantovich (Belarusian: Андрэй Зыгмантовіч, Russian: Андрей Викентьевич Зыгмантович; born 2 December 1962) is a Belarusian football coach and a former player. He is the head coach of Belarus U19.

Mainly a defensive midfielder with good positioning and skills, he played for nearly a decade with Dinamo Minsk, also having abroad stints in the Netherlands (one year) and Spain; in the early 2000s, he embarked on a coaching career.

Zygmantovich represented the Soviet Union at the 1990 World Cup and later played for Belarus.

== Club career ==
Born in Minsk, Soviet Union, Zygmantovich started playing for Dinamo Minsk. In his second professional season, he appeared 30 times and netted twice to help his hometown side win the only Soviet League in their history, edging Dynamo Kyiv by one point. After a spell with FC Groningen, the 30-year-old returned to the club where he would spend most of his career.

In early 1993, Zygmantovich moved abroad again, now to Spain with Racing de Santander where he would play the next three full campaigns, teaming up with former compatriots (Russian) Ilshat Faizulin, Dmitri Popov and Dmitri Radchenko. In 1993–94, he was an instrumental element as the Cantabrians achieved one of their best ever finishes in La Liga (eighth).

Zygmantovich started coaching in 2001 in his country, including the national team's under-19. In 2007, he moved to Lithuania with FBK Kaunas.

== International career ==
Zygmantovich made his debut for the Soviet Union on 28 March 1984, in an exhibition game with West Germany. He represented the nation at the 1990 FIFA World Cup, scoring a goal against Cameroon (4–0, although in a final group stage exit) which turned out to be his last international game for the country.

Zygmantovich later appeared for Belarus in nine matches, his first being a 1–1 friendly draw with Ukraine in Minsk, on 28 October 1992.

=== International goals ===
#	Date	Venue	Opponent	Score	Result	Competition
1.	28 January 1985	Maharaja College Stadium, Kochi, India	Iran	0–2	Win	1985 Nehru Cup
2.	28 August 1985	Lenin Central Stadium, Moscow, Soviet Union	West Germany	1–0	Win	Friendly
3.	18 June 1990	San Nicola, Bari, Italy	Cameroon	0–4	Win	1990 FIFA World Cup

== Honours ==
Dinamo Minsk

- Soviet Top League: 1982
- Belarusian Premier League: 1992–93
