= Mikhail Viarheyenka =

Belarusian footballer (1950–2024)

Mikhail Vergeyenko
Personal information
- Full name: Mikhail Nikiforovich Vergeyenko
- Date of birth: 12 January 1950
- Place of birth: Gomel, Byelorussian SSR, USSR
- Date of death: 16 July 2024 (aged 74)
- Height: 1.83 m (6 ft 0 in)
- Position: Goalkeeper

Youth career
- 1966–1967: Spartak Gomel
- 1968–1969: Dinamo Minsk

Senior career*
Years	Team	Apps	(Gls)
1970	Gomselmash Gomel	0	(0)
1971–1983	Dinamo Minsk	280	(1)

International career
- USSR U21

Managerial career
- 1984–1986: Dinamo Minsk (assistant)
- 1986–1988: Dinamo Minsk (sports director)
- 1989–1991: Dinamo Minsk (assistant)
- 1991–1994: Dinamo Minsk
- 1992–1994: Belarus
- 1997–1999: Belarus
- * Club domestic league appearances and goals

Mikhail Nikifaravich Viarheyenka (Belarusian: Міхаіл Нікіфаравіч Вяргеенка; 12 January 1950 – 16 July 2024) was a Soviet and Belarusian football manager and player who managed the Belarus national team between 1992 and 1994 and from 1998 to 1999. A goalkeeper, Viarheyenka played for Dinamo Minsk between 1971 and 1983.

After his second spell with the national team he retired from coaching and worked at Football Federation of Belarus for many years until 2011.

Viarheyenka died on 16 July 2024, at the age of 74. His son Aliaksei Viarheyenka is also a former footballer and currently works as a coach.

== Honours ==
Dinamo Minsk

- Soviet Top League: 1982
