= Igor Belov =

Belarusian and Russian footballer and coach

Personal information
- Full name: Igor Pavlovich Belov
- Date of birth: 21 October 1954 (age 72)
- Place of birth: Grodno, Byelorussian SSR, Soviet Union
- Height: 1.77 m (5 ft 9 1/2 in)
- Position: Defender

Senior career*
Years	Team	Apps	(Gls)
1972–1974	Khimik Grodno		
1975	SKA Khabarovsk	20	(0)
1976–1984	Dinamo Minsk	120	(0)
1984–1987	Dnepr Mogilev	108	(12)
1988–1989	Navbahor Namangan	76	(5)
1990	Znamya Truda Orekhovo-Zuyevo	15	(0)
1991–1993	Luch Vladivostok	67	(3)

Managerial career
- 1994–1995: Luch Vladivostok (assistant)
- 1996–1997: Molodechno
- 1997–1998: Belshina Bobruisk
- * Club domestic league appearances and goals

Igor Pavlovich Belov (Russian: Игорь Павлович Белов; born 21 October 1954) is a former Belarusian and Russian professional football player and coach. He made his professional debut in the Soviet Second League in 1972 for FC Neman Grodno.

== Honours ==
- Soviet Top League champion: 1982.
