= Sergei Nikitin (footballer) =

Russian footballer and referee

Personal information
- Full name: Sergei Vasilyevich Nikitin
- Date of birth: 2 August 1963 (age 63)
- Place of birth: Moscow, Russian SFSR
- Height: 1.81 m (5 ft 11 1/2 in)
- Positions: Defender; midfielder

Youth career
- FShM Moscow

Senior career*
| Years | Team | Apps | (Gls) |
| 1979 | FShM Moscow | 2 | (1) |
| 1980–1983 | FC Spartak Moscow | 3 | (0) |
| 1984 | FC Spartak Ordzhonikidze | 22 | (0) |
| 1985–1986 | FC Iskra Smolensk | 76 | (2) |
| 1987 | FC Shinnik Yaroslavl | 40 | (0) |
| 1989–1992 | FC Shinnik Yaroslavl | 117 | (7) |
| 1993–1995 | FC Asmaral Moscow | 93 | (2) |
| 1998–1999 | FC Smena Moscow | 27 | (2) |
| Total | | 380 | (14) |

Managerial career
- 1998–1999: FC Smena Moscow (youth teams)
- 2006: FC Olimp Zheleznodorozhny (assistant)
- 2011–2012: FC Lyubertsy (assistant)
- 2014: FC Zvezda Lyubertsy (youth teams assistant)
- * Club domestic league appearances and goals

Sergei Vasilyevich Nikitin (Russian: Серге́й Васильевич Никитин; born 2 August 1963) is a Russian professional football coach and a former player and referee.

== Club career ==
He made his professional debut in the Soviet Top League in 1982 for FC Spartak Moscow.

== Referee career ==
After his retirement as a player, he became a referee, mostly in the third-tier Russian Professional Football League.

== Honours ==
- Soviet Top League runner-up: 1983.
- Soviet Top League bronze: 1982.
