= Pyotr Vasilevsky =

Belarusian footballer and manager

Personal information
- Full name: Pyotr Petrovich Vasilevsky
- Date of birth: 29 June 1956
- Place of birth: Minsk, Soviet Union
- Date of death: 9 January 2012 (aged 55)
- Place of death: Minsk, Belarus
- Height: 1.71 m (5 ft 7 in)
- Position: Striker

Senior career*
Years	Team	Apps	(Gls)
1973–1979	Dinamo Minsk	152	(26)
1979	Pakhtakor Tashkent	12	(2)
1980–1984	Dinamo Minsk	113	(31)
1984–1985	Dnepr Mogilev	42	(32)

Managerial career
- 1989–1991: KIM Vitebsk
- 2006–2008: Belarus U17
- 2009: Belarus U19 (assistant)
- * Club domestic league appearances and goals

Pyotr Petrovich Vasilevsky (Russian: Пётр Петрович Василевский; 29 June 1956 – 9 January 2012) was a Belarusian football manager and former player. He worked in a building security company until his death.

== Honours ==
- Soviet Top League champion: 1982
- Soviet Top League bronze: 1983
