= Aleksandr Prokopenko =

Soviet footballer

Personal information
- Full name: Aleksandr Timofeyevich Prokopenko
- Date of birth: November 16, 1953
- Place of birth: Bobruisk, Byelorussian SSR, Soviet Union
- Date of death: March 29, 1989 (aged 35)
- Place of death: Minsk, Byelorussian SSR, Soviet Union
- Position: Midfielder

Senior career*
Years	Team	Apps	(Gls)
1971–1972	Stroitel Bobruisk		
1973–1983	Dinamo Minsk	310	(97)
1986	Dnepr Mogilev	15	(2)
1987	Neftchi Baku	5	(1)

International career
1980	Soviet Union	1	(0)
1980	Soviet Union Olympic	2	(0)
- * Club domestic league appearances and goals

Olympic medal record

Representing the Soviet Union

Men's football
Bronze medal – third place	1980 Moscow	Team

Aleksandr Timofeyevich Prokopenko (Russian: Александр Тимофеевич Прокопенко, Belarusian: Аляксандр Цімафеевіч Пракапенка, November 16, 1953 – March 29, 1989) was a Soviet football player. After retiring, he suffered from alcoholism, he died from choking on food in a restaurant age 35.

== Honours ==
- Olympic bronze: 1980.
- Soviet Top League winner: 1982.

== International career ==
Prokopenko played his only game for USSR on July 12, 1980, in a friendly against Denmark.
