= Ihar Hurynovich =

Belarusian footballer (born 1960)

Personal information
- Full name: Ihar Mikalayevich Hurynovich
- Date of birth: 5 March 1960 (age 66)
- Place of birth: Minsk, Belarusian SSR
- Height: 1.77 m (5 ft 10 in)
- Position: Forward

Youth career
- 1976–1977: Dinamo Minsk

Senior career*
Years	Team	Apps	(Gls)
1978–1987	Dinamo Minsk	213	(54)
1988	Lokomotiv Moscow	10	(1)
1988–1990	Dinamo Minsk	30	(4)
1990–1991	Brighton & Hove Albion	4	(1)
1991	Dinamo Brest	20	(8)
1991–1992	APEP	20	(10)
1992–1993	Veres Rivne	14	(2)
1993	Torpedo Minsk	7	(0)
1993	ŁKS Łódź	3	(0)
1993–1994	Castellón	12	(1)
1994–1995	Ataka-Aura Minsk	28	(13)
1995	LASK	13	(4)
1996	Ataka-Aura Minsk	20	(7)

International career
1977–1979	Soviet Union U18/U20		
1983	Soviet Union Olympic	1	(0)
1984	Soviet Union	1	(0)
1994–1995	Belarus	3	(1)

Managerial career
- 2010–2011: Bereza-2010
- 2013: Bereza-2010
- * Club domestic league appearances and goals

Ihar Mikalayevich Hurynovich (Belarusian: Iгар Мікалаевіч Гурыновiч, Russian: Игорь Николаевич Гуринович, Igor Nikolayevich Gurinovich; born 5 March 1960) is a Soviet-Belarusian former professional footballer who played as a forward.

== International career ==
Hurynovich played his only game for USSR on 28 March 1984, in a friendly against West Germany.

== Honours ==
Dinamo Minsk

- Soviet Top League: 1982

Soviet Union

- UEFA Under-18 Euro: 1978
- FIFA World Youth Championship runner-up: 1979
