= Oleg Smirnov (footballer, born 1964) =

Russian footballer

Personal information
- Full name: Oleg Aleksandrovich Smirnov
- Date of birth: 2 January 1964 (age 62)
- Place of birth: Pushkino, Russian SFSR
- Height: 1.74 m (5 ft 8 1/2 in)
- Positions: Midfielder; forward

Youth career
- 1979–1981: FC Spartak Moscow

Senior career*
Years	Team	Apps	(Gls)
1982–1983	FC Spartak Moscow	2	(0)
1984	FC Krasnaya Presnya Moscow	29	(0)
1985	FC Rotor Volgograd	27	(3)
1986	FC Torpedo Volzhsky	23	(1)
1988–1989	FC Krasnaya Presnya Moscow	48	(16)
1989–1993	FC Shinnik Yaroslavl	137	(46)
1994–1996	FC Spartak Shchyolkovo	95	(13)
1997	FC Roda Moscow	24	(3)
1998	FC Spartak Lukhovitsy	20	(2)
- * Club domestic league appearances and goals

Oleg Aleksandrovich Smirnov (Russian: Олег Александрович Смирнов; born 2 January 1964) is a Russian retired professional footballer. He made his professional debut in the Soviet Top League in 1982 for FC Spartak Moscow.

== Honours ==
- Soviet Top League runner-up: 1983.
- Soviet Top League bronze: 1982.
