= Yuri Kurnenin =

Belarusian footballer

Personal information
- Full name: Yuri Anatolyevich Kurnenin
- Date of birth: 14 June 1954
- Place of birth: Orekhovo-Zuyevo, Russian SFSR
- Date of death: 30 July 2009 (aged 55)
- Place of death: Minsk, Belarus
- Height: 1.71 m (5 ft 7 1/2 in)
- Positions: Defender; midfielder

Youth career
- 1964–1970: Znamya Truda Orekhovo-Zuyevo
- 1971–1972: Dinamo Moscow

Senior career*
Years	Team	Apps	(Gls)
1973–1975	Dinamo Moscow	17	(2)
1976–1987	Dinamo Minsk	315	(26)

Managerial career
- 1989–1990: KIM Vitebsk (assistant)
- 1991–1992: Dinamo Brest
- 1993–1994: Samotlor-XXI Nizhnevartovsk
- 1995–1996: Syria
- 1997: Al-Ahli Muscat
- 1998: Dinamo Minsk (assistant)
- 1999–2000: Dinamo Minsk
- 2001: Chernomorets Novorossiysk (assistant)
- 2003: Shakhtyor Soligorsk (assistant)
- 2003: Dinamo Minsk (assistant)
- 2003–2005: Belarus (assistant)
- 2006–2009: Belarus U-21
- * Club domestic league appearances and goals

Yuri Anatolyevich Kurnenin (Belarusian: Юрый Анатолевіч Курненін, Russian: Юрий Анатольевич Курненин; 14 June 1954 – 30 July 2009) was a Belarusian professional football player and coach of Russian origin. As a player, he made his professional debut in the Soviet Top League in 1973 for FC Dynamo Moscow.

To date, he remains the only Belarusian manager to have coached a national team in a major competition, when he coached Syria in the 1996 AFC Asian Cup.

== Honours ==
- Soviet Top League champion: 1982.
- Soviet Top League bronze: 1973, 1975, 1983.
- Soviet Cup finalist: 1987.

== European club competitions ==
- UEFA Cup 1974–75 with FC Dynamo Moscow: 1 game, 1 goal.
- European Cup 1983–84 with FC Dinamo Minsk: 6 games, 2 goals.
- UEFA Cup 1984–85 with FC Dinamo Minsk: 6 games.
- UEFA Cup 1986–87 with FC Dinamo Minsk: 2 games.
