= Vladimir Shcherbak (footballer, born 1959) =

Russian footballer

Personal information
- Full name: Vladimir Nikolayevich Shcherbak
- Date of birth: 2 September 1959 (age 67)
- Place of birth: Chystyakove, Ukrainian SSR
- Height: 1.81 m (5 ft 11 1/2 in)
- Position: Defender

Youth career
- DYuSSh Torez

Senior career*
| Years | Team | Apps | (Gls) |
| 1977–1978 | FC Shakhtar Horlivka | 61 | (2) |
| 1979–1980 | SKA Kyiv | | |
| 1981 | FC Shakhtar Donetsk | 9 | (0) |
| 1982 | FC Spartak Moscow | 24 | (0) |
| 1983–1985 | FC SKA Rostov-on-Don | 94 | (5) |
| 1987–1988 | FC Rostselmash Rostov-on-Don | 76 | (11) |
| 1989–1990 | FC Metalist Kharkiv | 49 | (3) |
| 1991 | FC APK Azov | 29 | (4) |
| 1992 | FC Kolos Krasnodar | 35 | (3) |
| 1993 | FC Kuzbass Kemerovo | 24 | (0) |
| 1994 | FC Krylia Sovetov Samara | 16 | (0) |
| 1994–1995 | FC Kuzbass Kemerovo | 21 | (1) |
| 1996 | FC Kolos Taganrog | 15 | (0) |
- * Club domestic league appearances and goals

Vladimir Nikolayevich Shcherbak (Russian: Владимир Николаевич Щербак; born 2 September 1959) is a former Russian professional footballer.

== Club career ==
He made his professional debut in the Soviet Second League in 1977 for FC Shakhtar Horlivka.

== Honours ==
- Soviet Top League bronze: 1982.
