= Liudas Rumbutis =

Lithuanian–Belarusian footballer and coach

Personal information
- Date of birth: 24 November 1955 (age 70)
- Place of birth: Telšiai, Lithuanian SSR, Soviet Union
- Position: Midfielder

Senior career*
Years	Team	Apps	(Gls)
1974–1975	Žalgiris Vilnius	55	(0)
1976–1986	Dinamo Minsk	187	(6)
1992–1993	Smena Minsk	38	(4)

Managerial career
- 1987–1990: Dinamo Brest
- 1991–1993: Smena Minsk
- 1994–1996: Molodechno
- 1996–1998: Dinamo-93 Minsk
- 1998–1999: Belshina Bobruisk
- 1999–2000: Lithuania (assistant)
- 2000–2002: Molodechno-2000
- 2003: Belarus (assistant)
- 2003: Belshina Bobruisk
- 2003–2004: Dinamo Minsk (director)
- 2004–2006: Darida Minsk Raion
- 2007–2008: Neman Grodno
- 2009–2012: MTZ-PIRO/Partizan Minsk (director)
- 2009–2010: MTZ-PIRO Minsk
- 2010–2011: Partizan Minsk
- 2011–2012: Partizan Minsk
- 2017–2018: Belarus U21
- * Club domestic league appearances and goals

Liudas Rumbutis (Belarusian: Людас Румбуціс; Russian: Людас Румбутис; born 24 November 1955) is a Lithuanian–Belarusian professional football coach and a former player. After spending his youth and early senior football career years in Lithuania, he moved to Belarus in 1975, and stayed there for his almost entire playing and coaching career. He won the Soviet champions title in 1982 with Dinamo Minsk.

During 2017–2018 he was a head coach of Belarus national under-21 football team.

== Honours ==
Dinamo Minsk

- Soviet Top League champion: 1982
