= Viktor Shishkin =

Soviet footballer and Russian coach

Viktor Shiskin
Personal information
- Full name: Viktor Maksimovich Shishkin
- Date of birth: 8 February 1955 (age 71)
- Place of birth: Sverdlovsk, Russian SFSR
- Height: 1.77 m (5 ft 10 in)
- Positions: Defender; midfielder

Senior career*
Years	Team	Apps	(Gls)
1972–1973	Uralets Nizhny Tagil	5	(0)
1974–1977	Uralmash Sverdlovsk	109	(1)
1978	Dinamo Minsk	36	(0)
1979	Uralmash Sverdlovsk	39	(3)
1979–1981	Lokomotiv Moscow	75	(1)
1982–1985	Dinamo Minsk	92	(2)
1986	Lokomotiv Moscow	36	(2)
1987–1988	Geolog Tyumen	80	(2)
1990–1991	Uralmash Sverdlovsk	108	(27)

International career
1984	USSR	1	(0)

Managerial career
- 1991: Uralmash Yekaterinburg (assistant)
- 1992–1994: Uralmash Yekaterinburg
- * Club domestic league appearances and goals

Viktor Maksimovich Shishkin (Russian: Виктор Максимович Шишкин; born February 8, 1955, in Sverdlovsk) is a retired Soviet football player and a Russian football coach.

== Honours ==
Dinamo Minsk

- Soviet Top League: 1982

== International career ==
Shishkin played his only game for USSR on March 28, 1984, in a friendly against West Germany.
