= Norbert Johannsen =

German footballer (born 1948)

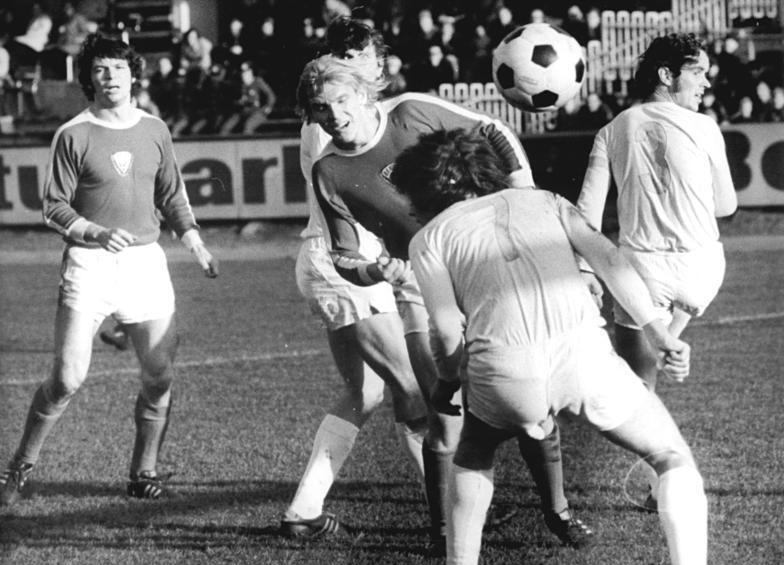
- Johannsen (left) during a match between BFC Dynamo and BSG Sachsenring Zwickau in the 1974–75 FDGB-Pokal on 26 October 1974

Personal information
- Date of birth: 20 July 1948 (age 78)
- Place of birth: Berlin, Soviet-occupied Germany (present-day Berlin, Germany)
- Position: Striker

Youth career
- 1956–1965: BSG Chemie Lichtenberg
- 1965–1967: BFC Dynamo

Senior career*
Years	Team	Apps	(Gls)
1967–1976	BFC Dynamo	131	(48)
1969–1971	BFC Dynamo II		
1975–1976	BFC Dynamo II		

International career
1971	East Germany U23	3	(0)
- * Club domestic league appearances and goals

Norbert Johannsen (born 20 July 1948) is a German former footballer.

Johannsen began playing football for the youth teams of BSG Chemie Lichtenberg at the age of eight. He then joined the youth teams of sports club SC Dynamo Berlin in 1965.

The football department of SC Dynamo Berlin was reorganized as football club BFC Dynamo on 15 January 1966. Johannsen made his debut for the first team of BFC Dynamo as an 18-year-old in the 14th matchday of the 1966–67 DDR-Oberliga away against 1. FC Lokomotive Leipzig on 18 February 1967. He then scored his first goal for BFC Dynamo in the DDR-Oberliga against FC Karl-Marx-Stadt in the following matchday at the Dynamo-Stadion im Sportforum on 25 February 1966. He was one of the lightest strikers in the league at the time with a mere 65 kg.

BFC Dynamo was relegated to the second tier DDR-Liga after the 1966–67 season. The club used the 1967–68 DDR-Liga Nord to integrate a number of youth players in the team. Johannsen would make a number of appearances with the first team during the season. However, he was not registered in the squad for the 1968–69 DDR-Oberliga, and would only make occasional appearances with the first team in the 1969–70 season.

Johannsen was registered in the squad again for the 1970–71 DDR-Oberliga. He would now make recurring appearances with the first team. BFC Dynamo reached the final of the 1970–71 FDGB-Pokal. The team was defeated 2–1 by SG Dynamo Dresden in the final. Johannsen scored the only goal for BFC Dynamo in the match on a penalty in the 70th minute. Johannsen finally made his breakthrough in the 1971–72 DDR-Oberliga. He was now a regular player in the team and played alongside forwards Ralf Schulenberg and Wolf-Rüdiger Netz.

BFC Dynamo was qualified for the 1971–72 European Cup Winners' Cup as runners-up in the 1970–71 FDGB-Pokal. It was the first participation of BFC Dynamo in an UEFA competition. Johannsen made his international debut with BFC Dynamo in the first round of 1971–72 European Cup Winners' Cup home against home against Cardiff City in the on 15 September 1972. He would play all matches for BFC Dynamo in the competition. BFC Dynamo eventually reached the semi-finals of the 1971–72 European Cup Winners' Cup. The first semi-final against Dynamo Moscow was played in front of 30,000 spectators at the Friedrich-Ludwig-Jahn-Sportpark on 5 April 1972. Dynamo Moskva took the lead in the match, with a goal in the 54th minute. But Johannsen equalized on a penalty in the 83rd minute. The match ended 1–1. BFC Dynamo was eventually eliminated on a penalty shoot-out in the second leg. Johannsen became the top goalscorer for BFC Dynamo in the 1971–72 DDR-Oberliga with 10 goals.

BFC Dynamo finished the 1971–72 DDR-Oberliga as runners-up and was qualified for the 1972–73 UEFA Cup. Johannsen scored the only goal for BFC Dynamo on a penalty in the 1–1 draw away against Angers in the first leg of the first round on 13 September 1972. He played all matches for BFC Dynamo in the competition. Johannsen played 24 matches for BFC Dynamo in the 1972–73 DDR-Oberliga. He was part of the starting line-up in all 24 matches. He became the league top goalscorer for BFC Dynamo for a second season in a row. He was used more sparingly during the 1973–74 season. However, Johannsen again played 24 matches for BFC Dynamo in the 1974–75 DDR-Oberliga as part of the starting line-up. He became the top goal scorer for BFC Dynamo in the league for a third time during the 1974–75 season.

Johannsen ended his playing career after the 1975–76 season. He scored 48 goals in 131 league matches for the first team of BFC Dynamo during his career. Johannsen played a match for the traditional team of BFC Dynamo against a selection of players from the 1974 East Germany national team in 2010. The match was played in celebration of the 60th birthday of Frank Terletzki. Johannsen played alongside former teammates from the 1970s such as Werner Lihsa, Frank Teletzki and Bernd Brillat. The traditional team of BFC Dynamo won the match 1–0.
