= Gerd Weber =

German footballer (born 1956)

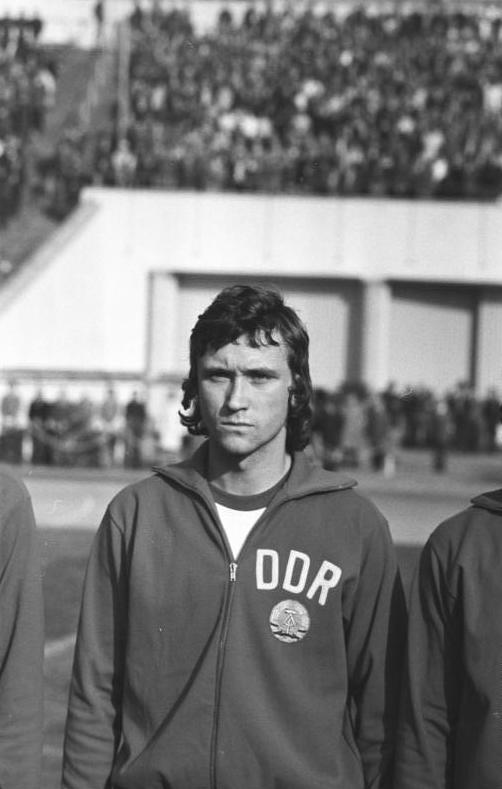
- Weber in 1975

Personal information
- Date of birth: 31 May 1956 (age 70)
- Place of birth: Dresden, East Germany
- Height: 1.80 m (5 ft 11 in)
- Positions: Right midfielder; right-back

Youth career
- 1962–1970: FSV Lokomotive Dresden
- 1970–: Dynamo Dresden

Senior career*
Years	Team	Apps	(Gls)
1972–1975	Dynamo Dresden II		
1973–1981	Dynamo Dresden		
1989–1992	SV Oberweier		

International career
1975–1980	East Germany	33	(5)
Medal record
Representing East Germany
Men's Football
Gold medal – first place	1976 Montreal	Team
- * Club domestic league appearances and goals

Gerd Weber (born 31 May 1956) is a German former footballer who played as a right midfielder or right-back for Dynamo Dresden.

== Club career ==
=== Senior career ===
Born in Dresden, Weber began his career in 1973 with Dynamo Dresden in the DDR-Oberliga.

== International career ==
Between 1975 and 1980 he played 33 times as a midfielder for the East Germany national team, scoring 5 goals. He won the gold medal at the football tournament of the 1976 Summer Olympics with the East Germany Olympic team.

== Stasi informer ==
Weber was a Stasi informer from 1975 onward, delivering more that seventy reports about his teammates. (Note: However, Weber was far from alone. Between 1978 and 1989, 18 of 72 Dynamo players were registered as unofficial collaborators (IM) of the Stasi, at least temporarily, including Ulf Kirsten.) For four years, Weber was listed as an unofficial collaborator (IM) of the Stasi under the codename "Wiehland".

== Defection to the West ==
In January 1981, Weber along with two teammates (Peter Kotte and Matthias Müller) were arrested by the Stasi, just as they were to travel to Argentina for an international match.

Weber had allegedly had contacts to West German side 1. FC Köln, and had solicited escape plans, intending to defect to West Germany. Weber was sentenced to two years and three months in prison by the Dresden District Court (German: Bezirksgericht Dresden). After eleven months he was released. However, he was banned from returning to professional football.

During an away match with SG Dynamo Dresden against FC Twente in the 1980-81 UEFA Cup in October 1980, Weber received a slip of paper with a supposed offer from 1. FC Köln. The offer was then renewed in connection with the match against Standard Liège in the next round of the cup. However, the offer did not come from representatives the club, but from impostors. The offer was said to be the solo effort of a busybody. In reality, the purported representatives of 1. FC Köln were SG Dynamo Dresden supporters, who had themselves left East Germany six months earlier.

The Stasi got wind of Weber's plan. Weber, Kotte and Müller had been reported by an unofficial collaborator (IM). The Stasi did not know that the supposed offer did not come from 1. FC Köln. Weber had solicited plans to defect, but the other two had not. Weber had even informed his girlfriend of his decision to accept the supposed offer and leave East Germany, with the intention that she would be smuggled out to the West Germany via another socialist country at the same time. Extensive activities in preparation for the escape were what put the Stasi on Weber's trail. With Lutz Eigendorf's defection to West Germany only half a year away, the Stasi cracked down hard.

Kotte and Müller received lifetime bans from playing in the top two tiers for alleged complicity. They knew about the intentions of Weber; their failure to inform authorities was critical. (Note: The Stasi could not prove that Kotte and Müller had plans to defect. In an interview with Tag24 in 2019, Müller said that this was probably because Weber had told the Stasi during interrogation that the two did not want to escape. But they were still considered accomplices as they had not fulfilled their reporting obligation.) Weber was sentenced to two years and three months in prison for planned "planned illegal border crossing", of which he served eleven months in Frankfurt an der Oder. He was excluced from the German Gymnastics and Sports Federation (DTBS), which meant that he would not be allowed to play club sports, not even for small locals clubs. He was not allowed to continue his sports teacher studies either. He was allowed to accomplish an apprentice as a car mechanic, but was denied the opportunity to obtain a master craftsman grade.

Neither Weber, Kotte nor Müller would thus return to play for SG Dynamo Dresden in the DDR-Oberliga. Supporters of SG Dynamo Dresden saw the bans on Weber, Kotte and Müller as "an order from Erich Mielke" designed to weaken SG Dynamo Dresden. However, such claims are doubtful. The three players had been reported by an unofficial collaborator (IM) and Mielke was convinced that all three were originally prepared to defect. The great fear of footballers, fans and officials who had fled East Germany was omnipresent at the Stasi. Former SED First Secretary in Bezirk Dresden Hans Modrow believes that the measures against the three were "probably cautious overall", given the completely different consequences for other East German citizens in similar contexts. After all, the three were also members of the armed organs (German: Bewaffnete Organe der DDR) with ranks. (Note: As players of SG Dynamo Dresden, the three were formally employees of the Volkspolizei.) Weber's escape helpers from Dresden - a technologist, a civil engineer and a waitress - received even harsher punishments.

Weber would make several applications to leave East Germany, but was rejected. In the summer of 1989, he eventually managed to flee East Germany to West Germany with his family, before the fall of the Berlin Wall. In West Germany, he settled in Friesenheim in the Black Forest.

== Later life ==
Weber, Kotte and Müller was rehabilitated by SG Dynamo Dresden after Die Wende in 1989. As of 2021, Weber still lives in Friesenheim, where he works as a claims adjuster for a car insurance company. Weber is today an honorary member of SG Dynamo Dresden and a celebrated former player at the club.

== Honours ==
SG Dynamo Dresden

- DDR-Oberliga
  - Winner: 1975–76, 1976–77, 1977–78
  - Runners-up: 1978–79, 1979–80
- FDGB-Pokal
  - Winner: 1976–77
  - Runners-up: 1973–74, 1974–75, 1977–78

East Germany

- Summer Olympics
  - Gold medalist: 1976
