= Uncle Paulo incident =

2024 incident in Brazil

Erika holding the head of her Uncle Paulo's corpse

On 16 April 2024, Érika de Souza Vieira Nunes, a 42-year-old Brazilian woman, brought the corpse of her 68-year-old uncle, Paulo Roberto Braga, to an Itaú bank branch in an attempt to withdraw a loan of 17,000 Brazilian reais. The incident occurred in the Bangu neighborhood of Rio de Janeiro and was recorded by bank employees.

The case was reported internationally.

== Incident ==
On 16 April 2024, Érika de Souza Vieira brought her uncle, Paulo Roberto Braga, to an Itaú bank branch. During the wait to be attended to, Érika sat down while holding Uncle Paulo's head with her hand; at one point, when she removed her hand from his head to rummage through her bag, Paulo's head slumped. At another moment, she went to the bathroom, where she stayed for about six minutes; during this time, a staff member had to support Paulo's head. Upon returning, Érika attempted to give water to her uncle; shortly after, she was finally attended to. Bank attendants recorded the moment; in the video, Érika was constantly trying to keep Paulo's head up while talking to him, asking him to sign the document to withdraw a loan of 17,000 Brazilian reais. The bank employees commented on Paulo's paleness, but his niece said, "he's always like that". Bank staff became suspicious of Érika's behavior and called the police. Emergency services were dispatched to the scene and determined that the man had been dead apparently for several hours; the doctor who attended to Paulo at the bank said that the elderly man showed livor mortis, discolorations that typically appear about two hours after death. Erika was arrested on the spot for attempted theft by fraud and desecration of a corpse.

The autopsy report stated that it was not possible to determine whether Paulo had died before or after arriving at the bank; security camera footage shows the elderly man entering the bank with his body already inert, lacking muscle control, and his neck slumped to the side. According to two experts who analyzed the video, Paulo was already deceased upon entering the agency.

== Victim ==
Paulo Roberto Braga (born 29 February 1956 in Rio de Janeiro) was a bus driver and had four siblings who lived in other states, so he had little contact with them. He had been living with his niece Érika and three of her children in the Bangu neighborhood for 15 years. Paulo had no children of his own and never married, although he had companions throughout his life. According to one of his nephews, Paulo had issues with alcohol consumption. According to the family, his health deteriorated because of drinking; Paulo even lost some of his mobility. He died at the age of 68 on 16 April 2024; according to a report from the Institute of Legal Medicine, he had died between 11:30 a.m. and 2:30 p.m due to bronchoaspiration of stomach contents and cardiac failure. He was buried in the Campo Grande cemetery on 20 April by the local authority, as his family could not afford to pay.

== Suspect ==
At the time of the incident, Érika de Souza Vieira Nunes (born 24 May 1981 in Rio de Janeiro) was 42 years old. She was arrested on the spot for attempted theft by fraud and desecration of a corpse. According to her family, Érika has psychiatric problems. In 2022, a report stated that she was dependent on sedatives, had symptoms of depression, suicidal thoughts, and auditory hallucinations. In 2023, another psychiatrist recommended Érika's hospitalization due to her dependence on sedatives and hypnotics. According to one of her children, she has attempted suicide several times.

== Reactions ==
The incident involving the corpse of Paulo Roberto Braga garnered global attention. It was reported by at least The Guardian, CNN, NBC News, USA Today, The Times of India, Le Parisien, Diário de Notícias, Perth Now, Tag24, and Daily Mirror. In The Sun, the case was called a "shameless scam"; in the Daily Star, it was compared to the 1989 movie Weekend at Bernie's. The Argentine newspaper La Nación referred to the incident as "horror en Brasil". In the United States, Donald Trump ally Ryan Fournier compared Uncle Paulo to then-president Joe Biden. On X (formerly Twitter), he commented on the video showing Erika trying to get Paulo's corpse to sign a document. Fournier wrote, "Make him President"; in the 2024 presidential election, age was one of the central points of the dispute.
