= Disguido =

Italian magician duo

- Occupations: Magician duo, illusionists, performers, actors
- Years active: 2005–present
- Website: www.disguidomagic.com

Disguido, an Italian magician duet formed by Guido Marini and Isabella Raponi Zanivan, is known for their creative performances combining illusionism, theatre, and magic. It has been active in the entertainment industry since 2005, presenting numerous performances and winning prestigious awards in the world of magic and theater.

== Biography ==
The couple: formed in 2005 in Rome. Guido Marini is an actor, director, and scenographer, who graduated from the Accademia di Belle Arti di Roma (Academy of Fine Arts in Rome). He trained with Orazio Costa, Nicola Zavagli, Ugo Chiti, Olga Melnik, Claudio Spadola, Nikolaj Karpov, and Marilyn Fried.

Isabella Raponi Zanivan is an actress, dancer, and psychologist, holding a degree from Sapienza University of Rome with a thesis titled "La fiducia nell'illusionista" (Trust in the Illusionist).

They premiered their first show, Magic Waits, in 2006 at the Teatro Flaiano in Rome, Italy. The performance included a cover band performing songs by Tom Waits

In 2006, they founded the cultural association Oltre la Scena, through which they produce international theatrical shows.

In 2010, they created the performance Chapeau Cinema, which they presented at the World Magic Championships, FISM, in 2015 (Rimini, Italy) and 2018 (Busan, Korea). The act modernized the art of chapeaugraphy, creating new forms of hats (such as a bull, telephone, shark, and knife sharpener) and integrating them with cinema.

In 2017, they created Abracadabra - La notte dei miracoli, an international magic festival in Rome and on tour in Italy, showcasing some of the world's most renowned illusionists.

Duet Disguido was invited to the Italian National Television (Rai) Programs, participated in WebTV programs, and discussed and reviewed in independent press such as Periscopio (Ferrara, Italy), Il Corriere della Citta (Italy), Rimini Today (Rimini, Italy), Firenze Today (Firenze, Italy), Askanews (Italy), Tag24 (Rome, Italy)., Sky and other.

On the International level, duet Disguido took part in the World Championaships of Magic - FISM Fédération Internationale des Sociétés Magiques (Italy, South Korea), International Forum of Magicians in Saint Petersburg (Russia), American TV show Penn & Teller: Fool Us, Edinburgh Festival Fringe (Scotland) and theaters in France, theaters and TV in Latvia. They regularly perform in Italy and Internationally.

== Awards ==
Guido Marini and Isabella Raponi Zanivan have received numerous accolades for their performances and innovation in magic and theater:

- 2020: 1st Prize at the International Forum of Magicians, Saint Petersburg
- 2018: Finalist at the World Championship of Magic, FISM Fédération Internationale des Sociétés Magiques, South Korea
- 2017: 3rd Prize at the European Championship of Magic, FISM, Blackpool
- 2015: Finalist at the World Championship of Magic, FISM, Rimini
- 2015 and 2013: Merlin d'Or at the Festival Magic Méribel, France
- 2013: Mandrake d'Or at the Académie Française des Illusionnistes, Paris
- 2012: 3rd Prize at the Masters of Magic – Italian Championship of Magic, Saint Vincent
- 2011: 1st Prize in Close-Up and Parlour Magic at the A. Sitta Trophy – Kalvin Award, Bologna

== Television Appearances ==
Guido Marini and Isabella Raponi Zanivan have appeared on several notable Italian and international television programs:

- La volta buona (2024) - La volta buona
- I Fatti Vostri (2024) - I Fatti Vostri
- Oggi è un altro giorno (2023) - Oggi è un altro giorno
- Fool Us with Penn & Teller (2022) - Penn & Teller
- L'ora solare (2022) - TV2000
- Iumor (2022) - IUmor
- Italia's Got Talent (2013) - Italia's Got Talent

== Cinema ==
The duo has also appeared in films and film festivals:

- 2024: 16th Donnafugate Film Festival
- 2007: Disco Magic Theatre directed by Andrea Maulà

== Theatre Performances ==
Guido Marini and Isabella Raponi Zanivan have performed in numerous theatres around the world, including:

- 2025–2017: Abracadabra - La notte dei miracoli at Teatro Ghione (Rome)
- 2024–2018: CinéMagique at Teatro Olimpico (Rome)
- 2015: Chapeau Cinema at Teatro Brancaccio (Rome)

== Parallel Activities ==
In addition to their artistic careers, the duo is involved in various parallel activities

- Organization of the international show Abracadabra - La notte dei miracoli
- Management of Italy's oldest magic shop Eclectica
- Consulting and directing theatrical and cinematic productions
- Teaching and workshops on theater and magic
- Founder of the cultural association Oltre la Scena
- Promoting and educating on the theater of poetry through the Pronto Intervento Poetico initiative
