= 1971–72 European Cup Winners' Cup =

Final positions
- Champions: (Scotland) Rangers (1st title)
- Runners-up: (Soviet Union) Dynamo Moscow

The 1971–72 season of the European Cup Winners' Cup football club tournament was won by Rangers, who defeated Dynamo Moscow in the final.

== Preliminary round ==
| Team 1 | Agg. | Team 2 | 1st leg | 2nd leg |
|---|---|---|---|---|
| BK 1909 (Denmark) | 4–4 (a) | Austria Wien | 4–2 | 0–2 |
| Hibernians (Malta) | 3–2 | (Iceland) Fram | 3–0 | 0–2 |

=== First leg ===
18 August 1971

| BK 1909 (Denmark) | 4–2 | Austria Wien |
|---|---|---|
| Thorn 47'; Richter 57' (pen.); Berg 75'; H Andersen 80' | Report | Foka 37' 60' |

Odense Stadium, Odense
Attendance: 10,561
Referee: Erik Axelryd (Sweden)

28 August 1971

| Hibernians (Malta) | 3–0 | (Iceland) Fram |
|---|---|---|
| Cini 65'; Micallef 70' 75' | Report |

Empire Stadium, Gzira
Attendance: 3,383
Referee: Paolo Toselli (Italy)

=== Second leg ===
25 August 1971

| Austria Wien | 2–0 | (Denmark) BK 1909 |
|---|---|---|
| Foka 21'; Köglberger 41' | Report |

Praterstadion, Vienna
Attendance: 7,873
Referee: Sándor Petri (Hungary)

4–4 on aggregate; Austria Wien won on away goals.

1 September 1971

| Fram (Iceland) | 2–0 | (Malta) Hibernians |
|---|---|---|
| Magnússon 22' 67' | Report |

Empire Stadium, Gzira
Attendance: 2,194
Referee: Francesco Francescon (Italy)

Hibernians won 3–2 on aggregate.

== First round ==
| Team 1 | Agg. | Team 2 | 1st leg | 2nd leg |
|---|---|---|---|---|
| Distillery (Northern Ireland) | 1–7 | (Spain) Barcelona | 1–3 | 0–4 |
| Hibernians (Malta) | 0–1 | (Romania) Steaua Bucharest | 0–0 | 0–1 |
| Servette (Switzerland) | 2–3 | (England) Liverpool | 2–1 | 0–2 |
| TJ Škoda Plzeň (Czechoslovakia) | 1–7 | (West Germany) Bayern Munich | 0–1 | 1–6 |
| Limerick (Republic of Ireland) | 0–5 | (Italy) Torino | 0–1 | 0–4 |
| Dinamo Tirana (Albania) | 1–2 | Austria Wien | 1–1 | 0–1 |
| Rennes (France) | 1–2 | (Scotland) Rangers | 1–1 | 0–1 |
| Sporting CP (Portugal) | 7–0 | (Norway) Lyn | 4–0 | 3–0 |
| Zagłębie Sosnowiec (Poland) | 4–5 | (Sweden) Åtvidaberg | 3–4 | 1–1 |
| Jeunesse Hautcharage (Luxembourg) | 0–21 | (England) Chelsea | 0–8 | 0–13 |
| Beerschot (Belgium) | 8–0 | (Cyprus) Anorthosis Famagusta | 7–0 | 1–0 |
| BFC Dynamo (East Germany) | 2–2 (5–4p) | (Wales) Cardiff City | 1–1 | 1–1 (aet) |
| Levski-Spartak (Bulgaria) | 1–3 | (Netherlands) Sparta Rotterdam | 1–1 | 0–2 |
| Komlói Bányász (Hungary) | 4–8 | (Socialist Federal Republic of Yugoslavia) Red Star Belgrade | 2–7 | 2–1 |
| Mikkeli (Finland) | 0–4 | (Turkey) Eskişehirspor | 0–0 | 0–4 |
| Olympiacos (Greece) | 2–3 | (Soviet Union) Dynamo Moscow | 0–2 | 2–1 |

=== First leg ===
15 September 1971

| Distillery (Northern Ireland) | 1–3 | (Spain) Barcelona |
|---|---|---|
| O'Neill 77' | Report | Alfonseda 44'; Asensi 57' 85' |

Windsor Park, Belfast
Attendance: 3,000
Referee: Antoine Queudeville (Luxembourg)

14 September 1971

| Hibernians (Malta) | 0–0 | (Romania) Steaua București |
|---|---|---|
| | Report |

National Stadium, Ta' Qali, Valletta
Attendance: 10,000
Referee: Josip Strmečki (Yugoslavia)

15 September 1971

| Servette (Switzerland) | 2–1 | (England) Liverpool |
|---|---|---|
| Dörfel 25'; Barriquand 48' | Report | Lawler 80' |

Stade des Charmilles, Geneva
Attendance: 21,000
Referee: Robert Wurtz (France)

15 September 1971

| TJ Škoda Plzeň (Czechoslovakia) | 0–1 | (Germany) Bayern Munich |
|---|---|---|
| | | Sühnholz 76' |

Plzeň
Attendance: 28,000
Referee: Costas Xanthoulis (Cyprus)

15 September 1971

| Limerick (Republic of Ireland) | 0–1 | (Italy) Torino |
|---|---|---|
| | | Rampanti 8' |

Thomond Park, Limerick

15 September 1971

| Dinamo Tirana (Albania) | 1–1 | Austria Wien |
|---|---|---|
| Çeço 70' (pen.) | Report | Dirnberger 64' |

Qemal Stafa Stadium, Tirana
Attendance: 18,051
Referee: Günter Männig (West Germany)

15 September 1971

| Stade Rennes (France) | 1–1 | (Scotland) Rangers |
|---|---|---|
| Redon 11' | | Johnston 68' |

Rennes
Attendance: 20,000

15 September 1971

| Sporting CP (Portugal) | 4–0 | (Norway) Lyn |
|---|---|---|
| Yazalde 8'; Lourenço 20' 90'; Marinho 88' | Report |

Estádio José Alvalade, Lisbon
Attendance: 17,022
Referee: Francesco Francescon (Italy)

15 September 1971

| Zagłębie Sosnowiec (Poland) | 3–4 | (Sweden) Åtvidaberg |
|---|---|---|
| Jarosik 15'; Gzel 50'; Gałeczka 82' | Report | Sandberg 30' (pen.) 47'; Torstensson 62'; Edström 71' |

Ludowy, Sosnowiec
Attendance: 15,000
Referee: Tsvetan Stanev (Bulgaria)

15 September 1971

| Jeunesse Hautcharage (Luxembourg) | 0–8 | (England) Chelsea |
|---|---|---|
| | Report | Osgood 2' 28' 42'; Houseman 9' 29'; Hollins 37'; Baldwin 74'; Webb 81' |

Stade Municipal, Luxembourg
Attendance: 13,000
Referee: Ferdinand Biwersi (West Germany)

23 September 1971

| Beerschot (Belgium) | 7–0 | (Cyprus) Anorthosis Famagusta |
|---|---|---|
| Tolsa 8' 29'; Van Opdorp 21'; Suykerbuyck 60'; Mertakkas 74' (o.g.); Claessen 76'; Mallants 87' | Report |

Olympisch, Antwerp
Attendance: 5,587
Referee: Norbert Rolles (Luxembourg)

15 September 1971

| BFC Dynamo (East Germany) | 1–1 | (Wales) Cardiff City |
|---|---|---|
| Schütze 90' | Report | Gibson 75' |

Friedrich-Ludwig-Jahn-Sportpark, East Berlin
Attendance: 11,651
Referee: Rolf Nyhus (Norway)

16 September 1971

| Levski-Spartak (Bulgaria) | 1–1 | (Netherlands) Sparta Rotterdam |
|---|---|---|
| Panov 40' | Report | Bosveld 81' |

Vasil Levski, Sofia
Attendance: 8,000
Referee: Timoleon Latsios (Greece)

15 September 1971

| Komlói Bányász (Hungary) | 2–7 | (Socialist Federal Republic of Yugoslavia) Red Star Belgrade |
|---|---|---|
| Juhász 14'; Horváth 44' | Report | Karasi 19'; Filipović 33' 53' 58' 71'; Antonijević 41'; Krivokuća 62' |

Pecsi ü, Komló
Attendance: 6,000
Referee: Francisco Lobo (Portugal)

15 September 1971

| Mikkeli (Finland) | 0–0 | (Turkey) Eskişehirspor |
|---|---|---|
| | Report |

Urheilupuisto, Mikkeli
Attendance: 3,796
Referee: Erik Axelryd (Sweden)

15 September 1971

| Olympiacos (Greece) | 0–2 | (Soviet Union) Dynamo Moscow |
|---|---|---|
| | Report | Kozlov 83' 87' |

Karaiskakis Stadium, Piraeus
Attendance: 41,817
Referee: Gerhard Kunze (East Germany)

=== Second leg ===
29 September 1971

| Barcelona (Spain) | 4–0 | (Northern Ireland) Distillery |
|---|---|---|
| Marcial 4' 29' 51' 66' | Report |

Camp Nou, Barcelona
Attendance: 15,000
Referee: Paul Bonett (Malta)

Barcelona won 7–1 on aggregate.

29 September 1971

| Steaua București (Romania) | 1–0 | (Malta) Hibernians |
|---|---|---|
| Caruana 9' (o.g.) | Report |

Stadionul 23 August, Bucharest
Attendance: 15,000
Referee: Muzaffer Sarvan (Turkey)

Steaua București won 1–0 on aggregate.

29 September 1971

| Liverpool (England) | 2–0 | (Switzerland) Servette |
|---|---|---|
| Hughes 27'; Heighway 59' | Report |

Anfield, Liverpool
Attendance: 38,591
Referee: Rudi Glöckner (East Germany)

Liverpool won 3–2 on aggregate.

29 September 1971

| Bayern Munich (Germany) | 6–1 | (Czechoslovakia) TJ Škoda Plzeň |
|---|---|---|
| G. Müller 1', 75'; Hoffmann 50', 70'; Krauthausen 15'; Roth 88' | | Bican 5' |

Munich
Attendance: 6,000
Referee: Christos Michas (Greece)

Bayern Munich won 7–1 on aggregate.

29 September 1971

| Torino (Italy) | 4–0 | (Republic of Ireland) Limerick |
|---|---|---|
| Toschi 46' 74' 83'; Luppi 80' |

Turin

Torino won 5–0 on aggregate.

29 September 1971

| Austria Wien | 1–0 | (Albania) Dinamo Tirana |
|---|---|---|
| Riedl 22' | Report |

Praterstadion, Vienna
Attendance: 1,425
Referee: Josef Poucek (Czechoslovakia)

Austria Wien won 2–1 on aggregate.

28 September 1971

| Rangers (Scotland) | 1–0 | (France) Stade Rennes |
|---|---|---|
| MacDonald 37' |

Ibrox Stadium, Glasgow
Attendance: 41,610

Rangers won 2–1 on aggregate.

29 September 1971

| Lyn (Norway) | 0–3 | (Portugal) Sporting CP |
|---|---|---|
| | Report | Yazalde 35' 70'; Dinis 42' |

Ullevaal Stadion, Oslo
Attendance: 3,214
Referee: Magnús Pétursson (Iceland)

Sporting CP won 7–0 on aggregate.

29 September 1971

| Åtvidaberg (Sweden) | 1–1 | (Poland) Zagłębie Sosnowiec |
|---|---|---|
| Ljungberg 15' | Report | Jarosik 7' |

Kopparvallen, Åtvidaberg
Attendance: 2,678
Referee: Kaj Rasmussen (Denmark)

Åtvidaberg won 5–4 on aggregate.

29 September 1971

| Chelsea (England) | 13–0 | (Luxembourg) Jeunesse Hautcharage |
|---|---|---|
| Osgood 4' 6' 63' 81' 85'; Hudson 12'; Hollins 13' (pen.); Webb 22'; Harris 43'; Baldwin 61' 69' 90'; Houseman 78' | Report |

Stamford Bridge, London
Attendance: 27,621
Referee: Richard Navarra (Malta)

Chelsea won 21–0 on aggregate.

29 September 1971

| Anorthosis Famagusta (Cyprus) | 0–1 | (Belgium) Beerschot |
|---|---|---|
| | Report | Kasprzak 90' (pen.) |

Olympisch, Antwerp
Attendance: 2,089
Referee: Marcel Hermann (Luxembourg)

Beerschot won 8–0 on aggregate.

29 September 1971

| Cardiff City (Wales) | 1–1 (a.e.t.) | (East Germany) BFC Dynamo |
|---|---|---|
| Clark 59' | Report | Labes 62' |
Penalties
| Gibson (penalty scored); Murray (penalty missed); King (penalty scored); Bell (penalty scored); Woodruff (penalty scored) | 4–5 | (penalty scored) Johannsen; (penalty scored) Terletzki; (penalty scored) Carow; (penalty scored) Becker; (penalty scored) Labes |

Ninian Park, Cardiff
Attendance: 12,676
Referee: Franz Geluck (Belgium)

2–2 on aggregate; BFC Dynamo won 5–4 on penalties.

29 September 1971

| Sparta Rotterdam (Netherlands) | 2–0 | (Bulgaria) Levski-Spartak |
|---|---|---|
| Kristensen 5'; Kowalik 49' | Report |

Stadion Spangen, Rotterdam
Attendance: 22,000
Referee: William Mullan (Scotland)

Sparta won 3–1 on aggregate.

29 September 1971

| Red Star Belgrade (Socialist Federal Republic of Yugoslavia) | 1–2 | (Hungary) Komlói Bányász |
|---|---|---|
| Aćimović 25' | Report | Juhász 35'; Bencsik 60' |

Red Star Stadium, Belgrade
Attendance: 5,000
Referee: Valentin Lipatov (Russia)

Red Star Belgrade won 8–4 on aggregate.

29 September 1971

| Eskişehirspor (Turkey) | 4–0 | (Finland) Mikkeli |
|---|---|---|
| Heper 8' 15' 40' 80' | Report |

Eskişehir Atatürk Stadı, Eskişehir
Attendance: 11,935
Referee: Constantin Bărbulescu (Romania)

Eskişehirspor won 4–0 on aggregate.

30 September 1971

| Dynamo Moscow (Soviet Union) | 1–2 | (Greece) Olympiacos |
|---|---|---|
| Sabo 6' | Report | Triantafyllos 6'; Gaitatzis 45' |

Central Dynamo Stadium, Moscow
Attendance: 22,000
Referee: Anton Bucheli (Switzerland)

Dynamo Moscow won 3–2 on aggregate.

== Second round ==
| Team 1 | Agg. | Team 2 | 1st leg | 2nd leg |
|---|---|---|---|---|
| Barcelona (Spain) | 1–3 | (Romania) Steaua Bucharest | 0–1 | 1–2 |
| Liverpool (England) | 1–3 | (West Germany) Bayern Munich | 0–0 | 1–3 |
| Torino (Italy) | 1–0 | Austria Wien | 1–0 | 0–0 |
| Rangers (Scotland) | 6–6 (a) ^{1} | (Portugal) Sporting CP | 3–2 | 3–4 (aet) |
| Åtvidaberg (Sweden) | 1–1 (a) | (England) Chelsea | 0–0 | 1–1 |
| Beerschot (Belgium) | 2–6 | (East Germany) BFC Dynamo | 1–3 | 1–3 |
| Sparta Rotterdam (Netherlands) | 2–3 | (Socialist Federal Republic of Yugoslavia) Red Star Belgrade | 1–1 | 1–2 |
| Eskişehirspor (Turkey) | 0–2 | (Soviet Union) Dynamo Moscow | 0–1 | 0–1 |

^{1}The second leg was originally 3–2 to Sporting after 90 minutes, and 4–3 to Sporting after extra time. The referee erroneously ordered a penalty shoot-out which Sporting won 2–0; UEFA later ruled that Rangers had won on away goals.

=== First leg ===
20 October 1971

| Barcelona (Spain) | 0–1 | (Romania) Steaua București |
|---|---|---|
| | Report | Năstase 12' |

Camp Nou, Barcelona
Attendance: 40,000
Referee: Desmott Barett (Republic of Ireland)

20 October 1971

| Torino (Italy) | 1–0 | Austria Wien |
|---|---|---|
| Agroppi 81' |

Turin
Referee: Hans-Joachim Weyland (East Germany)

20 October 1971

| Rangers (Scotland) | 3–2 | (Portugal) Sporting CP |
|---|---|---|
| Stein 5', 10'; Henderson 30' | | Chico Faria 67'; Wágner 88' |

Ibrox Stadium, Glasgow
Attendance: 50,302
Referee: Rudi Glöckner (East Germany)

20 October 1971

| Beerschot (Belgium) | 1–3 | (East Germany) BFC Dynamo |
|---|---|---|
| Suykerbuyck 62' | Report | Schütze 60'; Johannsen 80'; Rohde 89' |

Olympisch Stadion, Antwerp
Attendance: 6,118
Referee: Francisco Lobo (Portugal)

=== Second leg ===
3 November 1971

| Steaua București (Romania) | 2–1 | (Spain) Barcelona |
|---|---|---|
| Năstase 53' (pen.), 60' | Report | Asensi 50' |

Stadionul Republicii, Bucharest
Attendance: 5,000
Referee: Pius Kamber (Switzerland)

Steaua București won 3–1 on aggregate.

3 November 1971

| Austria Wien | 0–0 | (Italy) Torino |

Vienna
Referee: Robert Héliès (France)

Torino won 1–0 on aggregate.

3 November 1971

| Sporting CP (Portugal) | 4–3 (a.e.t.) | (Scotland) Rangers |
|---|---|---|
| Yazalde 25'; Laranjeira 38'; Pedro Gomes 87'; Peres 115' | | Stein 26', 46'; Henderson 100' |

Estádio José Alvalade, Lisbon
Attendance: 20,000
Referee: Laurens van Ravens (Netherlands)

6–6 on aggregate; Rangers won on away goals. (Note: The original result of the penalty shoot-out was as follows: Sporting CP: Caló (penalty scored); Yazalde (penalty scored); Peres (penalty missed); Penalties 2–0 Rangers: (penalty missed) Jardine; (penalty missed) McLean; (penalty missed) Stein; (penalty missed) Smith)

3 November 1971

| BFC Dynamo (East Germany) | 3–1 | (Belgium) Beerschot |
|---|---|---|
| Johannsen 25'; Labes 75'; Becker 85' | Report | Kasprzak 76' |

Friedrich-Ludwig-Jahn-Sportpark, East Berlin
Attendance: 8,304
Referee: Ib Nielsen (Denmark)

BFC Dynamo won 6−2 on aggregate.

== Quarter-finals ==
| Team 1 | Agg. | Team 2 | 1st leg | 2nd leg |
|---|---|---|---|---|
| Steaua Bucharest (Romania) | 1–1 (a) | (West Germany) Bayern Munich | 1–1 | 0–0 |
| Torino (Italy) | 1–2 | (Scotland) Rangers | 1–1 | 0–1 |
| Åtvidaberg (Sweden) | 2–4 | (East Germany) BFC Dynamo | 0–2 | 2–2 |
| Red Star Belgrade (Socialist Federal Republic of Yugoslavia) | 2–3 | (Soviet Union) Dynamo Moscow | 1–2 | 1–1 |

=== First leg ===
8 March 1972

| Steaua București (Romania) | 1–1 | (West Germany) Bayern Munich |
|---|---|---|
| Tătaru 17' | Report | Müller 70' |

Stadionul 23 August, Bucharest
Attendance: 40,000
Referee: Adrianus Bogaerts (Netherlands)

8 March 1972

| Torino (Italy) | 1–1 | (Scotland) Rangers |
|---|---|---|
| Pulici 61' | | Johnston 12' |

Turin

8 March 1972

| Åtvidaberg (Sweden) | 0–2 | (East Germany) BFC Dynamo |
|---|---|---|
| | Report | Netz 36', 58' |

Råsunda Stadium, Solna
Attendance: 5,000
Referee: Francesco Francescon (Italy)

=== Second leg ===
22 March 1972

| Bayern Munich (West Germany) | 0–0 | (Romania) Steaua București |
|---|---|---|
| | Report |

Grünwalder Stadion, Munich
Attendance: 40,000
Referee: Jozef Krňávek (Czechoslovakia)

1–1 on aggregate; Bayern Munich won on away goals.

22 March 1972

| Rangers (Scotland) | 1–0 | (Italy) Torino |
|---|---|---|
| MacDonald 46' |

Ibrox Stadium, Glasgow
Attendance: 75,048

Rangers won 2–1 on aggregate.

22 March 1972

| BFC Dynamo (East Germany) | 2–2 | (Sweden) Åtvidaberg |
|---|---|---|
| Schulenberg 11'; Netz 38' | Report | Wallinder 29'; Sandberg 31' |

Friedrich-Ludwig-Jahn-Sportpark, East Berlin
Attendance: 30,000
Referee: Bobby Davidson (Scotland)

BFC Dynamo won 4−2 on aggregate.

== Semi-finals ==
| Team 1 | Agg. | Team 2 | 1st leg | 2nd leg |
|---|---|---|---|---|
| Bayern Munich (West Germany) | 1–3 | (Scotland) Rangers | 1–1 | 0–2 |
| BFC Dynamo (East Germany) | 2–2 (1–4p) | (Soviet Union) Dynamo Moscow | 1–1 | 1–1 (aet) |

=== First leg ===
5 April 1972

| Bayern Munich (West Germany) | 1–1 | (Scotland) Rangers |
|---|---|---|
| Breitner 21' | Report Report 2 | Zobel 47' (o.g.) |

Grünwalder Stadion, Munich
Attendance: 40,000
Referee: Liuben Radunchev (Bulgaria)

5 April 1972

| BFC Dynamo (East Germany) | 1–1 | (Soviet Union) Dynamo Moscow |
|---|---|---|
| Johannsen 83' (pen.) | Report Report 2 Report 3 | Yevriuzhikin 54' |

Friedrich-Ludwig-Jahn-Sportpark, East Berlin
Attendance: 30,000
Referee: Gusztav Bircsak (Hungary)

=== Second leg ===
19 April 1972

| Rangers (Scotland) | 2–0 | (West Germany) Bayern Munich |
|---|---|---|
| Jardine 1'; Parlane 22' | Report Report 2 |

Ibrox Stadium, Glasgow
Attendance: 80,362
Referee: Francesco Francescon (Italy)

Rangers won 3–1 on aggregate.

20 April 1972

| Dynamo Moscow (Soviet Union) | 1–1 (a.e.t.) | (East Germany) BFC Dynamo |
|---|---|---|
| Yevriuzhikin 58' | Report Report 2 Report 3 | Netz 37' |
Penalties
| Dolmatov (penalty scored); Baydachniy (penalty scored); Evryuzhikhin (penalty scored); Makhovikov (penalty scored) | 4–1 | Johannsen (penalty missed); Terletzki (penalty missed); Carow (penalty scored) |

Druzhba Stadium, Lviv
Attendance: 25,000
Referee: Johan Boström (Sweden)

2–2 on aggregate; Dynamo Moscow won 4–1 on penalties.

== Final ==
24 May 1972
20:30

| Rangers (Scotland) | 3–2 | (Soviet Union) Dynamo Moscow |
|---|---|---|
| Stein 23'; Johnston 40', 49' | Report Report 2 | Eshtrekov 60'; Makhovikov 87' |

Camp Nou, Barcelona
Attendance: 24,701
Referee: José María Ortiz de Mendíbil (Spain)
