= Russian football clubs in European competitions =

Russian football teams have taken part in European competitions since the 1966–67 season, as part of the Soviet Union until the 1991–92 season, and as an independent country from then on.

== Active competitions ==
=== European Cup / UEFA Champions League ===
As of 22 February 2023

1966-67	Torpedo Moscow								
R32	(Italy) Internazionale	0-0	0-1						
1970-71	Spartak Moscow								
R32	(Switzerland) Basel	3-2	1-2						
1971-72	CSKA Moscow								
R32	(Turkey) Galatasaray	1-1	3-0						
R16	(Belgium) Standard Liège	1-0	0-2						
1977-78	Torpedo Moscow								
R32	(Portugal) Benfica	0-0	0-0						
1980-81	Spartak Moscow								
R32	(Luxembourg) Jeunesse Esch	5-0	4-0						
R16	(Denmark) Esbjerg	3-0	0-2						
QF	(Spain) Real Madrid	0-0	0-2						
1985-86	Zenit Leningrad								
R32	(Norway) Vålerenga	2-0	2-0						
R16	(Finland) Kuusysi Lahti	2-1	1-3						
1988-89	Spartak Moscow								
R32	(Northern Ireland) Glentoran	2-0	1-1						
R16	(Romania) Steaua Bucharest	0-3	1-2						
1990-91	Spartak Moscow								
R32	(Czechoslovakia) Sparta Prague	2-0	2-0						
R16	(Italy) Napoli	0-0	0-0						
QF	(Spain) Real Madrid	0-0	3-1						
SF	(France) Olympique Marseille	1-3	1-2						
1992-93	CSKA Moscow								
R32	(Iceland) Víkingur Reykjavík	1-0	4-1						
R16	(Spain) Barcelona	1-1	3-2						
QF	(Belgium) Club Brugge	0-1	1-2						
QF	(Scotland) Rangers	0-1	0-0						
QF	(France) Olympique Marseille	1-1	0-6						
1993-94	Spartak Moscow								
R32	(Latvia) Skonto Riga	5-0	4-0						
R16	(Poland) Lech Poznań	5-1	2-1						
QF	(France) Monaco	1-4	0-0						
QF	(Turkey) Galatasaray	0-0	2-1						
QF	(Spain) Barcelona	2-2	1-5						
1994-95	Spartak Moscow								
R16	(Ukraine) Dynamo Kyiv	2-3	1-0						
R16	(France) PSG	1-2	1-4						
R16	(Germany) Bayern Munich	1-1	2-2						
1995-96	Spartak Moscow								
R16	(England) Blackburn Rovers	1-0	3-0						
R16	(Poland) Legia Warsaw	2-1	1-0						
R16	(Norway) Rosenborg	4-2	4-1						
QF	(France) Nantes	0-2	2-2						
1996-97	Alania Vladikavkaz								
QR	(Scotland) Rangers	1-3	2-7						
1997-98	Spartak Moscow								
QR2	(Slovakia) Košice	1-2	0-0						
1998-99	Spartak Moscow								
QR3	(Bulgaria) Litex Lovech	5-0	6-2						
R24	(Austria) Sturm Graz	2-0	0-0						
R24	(Spain) Real Madrid	2-1	1-2						
R24	(Italy) Internazionale	1-2	0-0						
1999-00	Spartak Moscow			CSKA Moscow					
QR2				(Norway) Molde	2-0	0-4			
QR3	(Serbia and Montenegro) Partizan Belgrade	2-0	3-1						
R32	(Netherlands) Willem II Tilburg	3-1	1-1						
R32	(Czech Republic) Sparta Prague	1-1	2-5						
R32	(France) Girondins Bordeaux	1-2	1-2						
2000-01	Spartak Moscow			Lokomotiv Moscow					
QR3				(Turkey) Beşiktaş	0-3	1-6			
R32	(Germany) Bayer Leverkusen	2-0	0-1						
R32	(Spain) Real Madrid	0-1	1-0						
R32	(Portugal) Sporting CP	3-1	3-0						
R16	(England) Arsenal	4-1	0-1						
R16	(France) Olympique Lyonnais	0-3	1-1						
R16	(Germany) Bayern Munich	0-1	0-3						
2001-02	Spartak Moscow			Lokomotiv Moscow					
QR3				(Austria) Tirol Innsbruck	3-1	0-1			
R32	(Netherlands) Feyenoord	2-2	1-2	(Belgium) Anderlecht	1-1	5-1			
R32	(Germany) Bayern Munich	1-3	1-5	(Spain) Real Madrid	0-4	2-0			
R32	(Czech Republic) Sparta Prague	0-2	2-2	(Italy) Roma	1-2	0-1			
2002-03	Spartak Moscow			Lokomotiv Moscow					
QR3				(Austria) Grazer AK	2-0	3-3			
R32	(Switzerland) Basel	0-2	0-2	(Turkey) Galatasaray	0-2	2-1			
R32	(Spain) Valencia	0-3	0-3	(Belgium) Club Brugge	0-0	2-0			
R32	(England) Liverpool	0-5	1-3	(Spain) Barcelona	1-3	0-1			
R16				(Germany) Borussia Dortmund	1-2	0-3			
R16				(Spain) Real Madrid	2-2	0-1			
R16				(Italy) Milan	0-1	0-1			
2003-04	Lokomotiv Moscow			CSKA Moscow					
QR2				(North Macedonia) Vardar Skopje	1-2	1-1			
QR3	(Ukraine) Shakhtar Donetsk	0-1	3-1						
R32	(Ukraine) Dynamo Kyiv	0-2	3-2						
R32	(England) Arsenal	0-0	0-3						
R32	(Italy) Internazionale	3-0	1-1						
R16	(France) Monaco	2-1	0-1						
2004-05	CSKA Moscow								
QR2	(Azerbaijan) Neftçi	0-0	2-0						
QR3	(Scotland) Rangers	2-1	1-1						
GS	(England) Chelsea	1-3	2-1						
GS	(Portugal) Porto	0-0	0-1						
GS	(France) PSG	0-2	0-0						
2005-06	Lokomotiv Moscow								
QR2	(North Macedonia) Rabotnički	1-1	2-0						
QR3	(Austria) Rapid Wien	1-1	0-1						
2006-07	CSKA Moscow			Spartak Moscow					
QR2				(Moldova) Sheriff Tiraspol	1-1	0-0 (a)			
QR3	(Slovakia) Ružomberok	3-0	2-0	(Czech Republic) Slovan Liberec	0-0	2-1			
GS	(England) Arsenal	1-0	0-0	(Germany) Bayern Munich	0-4	2-2			
GS	(Portugal) Porto	0-0	0-2	(Italy) Internazionale	1-2	0-1			
GS	(Germany) Hamburg	1-0	2-3	(Portugal) Sporting CP	1-1	3-1			
2007-08	CSKA Moscow			Spartak Moscow					
QR3				(Scotland) Celtic	1-1	1-1 (3-4p)			
GS	(Italy) Internazionale	1-2	2-4						
GS	(Turkey) Fenerbahçe	2-2	1-3						
GS	(Netherlands) PSV	1-2	0-1						
2008-09	Zenit			Spartak Moscow					
QR3				(Ukraine) Dynamo Kyiv	1-4	1-4			
GS	(Italy) Juventus	0-1	0-0						
GS	(Spain) Real Madrid	1-2	0-3						
GS	(Belarus) BATE Borisov	1-1	2-0						
2009-10	Rubin Kazan			CSKA Moscow			Dynamo Moscow		
QR3							(Scotland) Celtic	1-0	0-2
GS	(Spain) Barcelona	2-1	0-0	(England) Manchester United	0-1	3-3			
GS	(Italy) Internazionale	1-1	0-2	(Germany) Wolfsburg	1-3	2-1			
GS	(Ukraine) Dynamo Kyiv	1-3	0-0	(Turkey) Beşiktaş	2-1	2-1			
R16				(Spain) Sevilla	1-1	2-1			
QF				(Italy) Internazionale	0-1	0-1			
2010-11	Rubin Kazan			Spartak Moscow			Zenit		
QR3							(Romania) Unirea Urziceni	0-0	1-0
PO							(France) Auxerre	1-0	0-2
GS	(Spain) Barcelona	1-1	0-2	(England) Chelsea	0-2	1-4			
GS	(Denmark) Copenhagen	0-1	1-0	(France) Olympique Marseille	1-0	0-3			
GS	(Greece) Panathinaikos	0-0	0-0	(Slovakia) Žilina	3-0	2-1			
2011-12	Zenit			CSKA Moscow			Rubin Kazan		
QR3							(Ukraine) Dynamo Kyiv	2-0	2-1
PO							(France) Olympique Lyonnais	1-3	1-1
GS	(Cyprus) APOEL	1-2	0-0	(Italy) Internazionale	2-3	2-1			
GS	(Portugal) Porto	3-1	0-0	(Turkey) Trabzonspor	3-0	0-0			
GS	(Ukraine) Shakhtar Donetsk	2-2	1-0	(France) Lille	2-2	0-2			
R16	(Portugal) Benfica	3-2	0-2	(Spain) Real Madrid	1-1	1-4			
2012-13	Zenit			Spartak Moscow					
PO				(Turkey) Fenerbahçe	2-1	1-1			
GS	(Spain) Málaga	0-3	2-2	(Spain) Barcelona	2-3	0-3			
GS	(Italy) Milan	2-3	0-1	(Scotland) Celtic	2-3	1-2			
GS	(Belgium) Anderlecht	1-0	0-1	(Portugal) Benfica	2-1	0-2			
2013-14	CSKA Moscow			Zenit					
PO				(Portugal) Paços de Ferreira	4-1	4-2			
GS	(Germany) Bayern Munich	0-3	1-3	(Spain) Atlético Madrid	1-3	1-1			
GS	(England) Manchester City	1-2	2-5	(Portugal) Porto	1-0	1-1			
GS	(Czech Republic) Viktoria Plzeň	3-2	1-2	Austria Wien	0-0	1-4			
R16				(Germany) Borussia Dortmund	2-4	2-1			
2014-15	CSKA Moscow			Zenit					
QR3				(Cyprus) AEL Limassol	0-1	3-0			
PO				(Belgium) Standard Liège	1-0	3-0			
GS	(Germany) Bayern Munich	0-1	0-3	(France) Monaco	0-0	0-2			
GS	(England) Manchester City	2-2	2-1	(Germany) Bayer Leverkusen	0-2	1-2			
GS	(Italy) Roma	1-5	1-1	(Portugal) Benfica	2-0	1-0			
2015-16	Zenit			CSKA Moscow					
QR3				(Czech Republic) Sparta Prague	2-2	3-2			
PO				(Portugal) Sporting CP	1-2	3-1			
GS	(Belgium) Gent	2-1	1-2	(Germany) Wolfsburg	0-1	0-2			
GS	(Spain) Valencia	3-2	2-0	(Netherlands) PSV	3-2	1-2			
GS	(France) Olympique Lyonnais	3-1	2-1	(England) Manchester United	1-1	0-1			
R16	(Portugal) Benfica	0-1	1-2						
2016-17	CSKA Moscow			Rostov					
QR3				(Belgium) Anderlecht	2-2	2-0			
PO				(Netherlands) Ajax	1-1	4-1			
GS	(France) Monaco	1-1	0-3	(Spain) Atlético Madrid	0-1	1-2			
GS	(Germany) Bayer Leverkusen	2-2	1-1	(Germany) Bayern Munich	0-5	3-2			
GS	(England) Tottenham Hotspur	0-1	1-3	(Netherlands) PSV	2-2	0-0			
2017-18	Spartak Moscow			CSKA Moscow					
QR3				(Greece) AEK Athens	2-0	1-0			
PO				(Switzerland) Young Boys	1-0	2-0			
GS	(England) Liverpool	1-1	0-7	(England) Manchester United	1-4	1-2			
GS	(Spain) Sevilla	5-1	1-2	(Switzerland) Basel	0-2	2-1			
GS	(Slovenia) Maribor	1-1	1-1	(Portugal) Benfica	2-1	2-0			
2018-19	Lokomotiv Moscow			CSKA Moscow			Spartak Moscow		
QR3							(Greece) PAOK	2-3	0-0
GS	(Portugal) Porto	1-3	1-4	(Spain) Real Madrid	1-0	3-0			
GS	(Germany) Schalke 04	0-1	0-1	(Italy) Roma	0-3	1-2			
GS	(Turkey) Galatasaray	0-3	2-0	(Czech Republic) Viktoria Plzeň	2-2	1-2			
2019-20	Zenit			Lokomotiv Moscow			Krasnodar		
QR3							(Portugal) Porto	0-1	3-2 (a)
PO							(Greece) Olympiacos	0-4	1-2
GS	(Germany) RB Leipzig	1-2	0-2	(Italy) Juventus	1-2	1-2			
GS	(France) Olympiqe Lyonnais	1-1	2-0	(Spain) Atlético Madrid	0-2	0-2			
GS	(Portugal) Benfica	3-1	0-3	(Germany) Bayer Leverkusen	2-1	0-2			
2020-21	Zenit			Lokomotiv Moscow			Krasnodar		
PO							(Greece) PAOK	2-1	2-1
GS	(Germany) Borussia Dortmund	0-2	1-2	(Germany) Bayern Munich	1-2	0-2	(England) Chelsea	0-4	1-1
GS	(Italy) Lazio	1-1	1-3	(Spain) Atlético Madrid	1-1	0-0	(Spain) Sevilla	2-3	1-2
GS	(Belgium) Club Brugge	1-2	0-3	(Austria) Red Bull Salzburg	2-2	1-3	(France) Rennes	1-1	1-0
2021-22	Zenit			Spartak Moscow					
QR3				(Portugal) Benfica	0-2	0-2			
GS	(England) Chelsea	3-3	0-1						
GS	(Italy) Juventus	0-1	2-4						
GS	(Sweden) Malmö	4-0	1-1						

=== UEFA Cup / Europa League ===
As of 22 February 2023

Season	Club	Round	Opponent	Home	Away	Aggregate
UEFA Cup
1971–72	Spartak Moscow	1R	(Czechoslovakia) Košice	2-0	1–2	3-2
1971–72	Spartak Moscow	2R	(Portugal) Vitória de Setúbal	0-0	0-4	0-4
1974–75	Dynamo Moscow	1R	(Sweden) Öster	2-1	2-3	4-4 (a)
1974–75	Dynamo Moscow	2R	(East Germany) Dynamo Dresden	1-0	0-1	1-1 (a.e.t.)
1974–75	Spartak Moscow	1R	(Socialist Federal Republic of Yugoslavia) Velež Mostar	3–1	0–2	3–3 (a)
1975–76	Spartak Moscow	1R	(Sweden) AIK	1-0	1-1	2-1
1975–76	Spartak Moscow	2R	(West Germany) Köln	2-0	1-0	3-0
1975–76	Spartak Moscow	3R	(Italy) Milan	2-0	0-4	2-4
1975–76	Torpedo Moscow	1R	(Italy) Napoli	4–1	1-1	5-2
1975–76	Torpedo Moscow	2R	(Turkey) Galatasaray	3-0	4-2	7-2
1975–76	Torpedo Moscow	3R	(East Germany) Dynamo Dresden	3-1	0-3	3-4
1976–77	Dynamo Moscow	1R	(Greece) AEK Athens	2-1	0-2	2-3 (a.e.t.)
1978–79	Torpedo Moscow	1R	(Norway) Molde	4-0	3-3	7-3
1978–79	Torpedo Moscow	2R	(West Germany) Stuttgart	2-1	0-2	2-3
1980–81	Dynamo Moscow	1R	(Belgium) Lokeren	0-1	1-1	1-2
1981–82	CSKA Moscow	1R	(Austria) Sturm Graz	2-1	0-1	2-2 (a)
1981–82	Spartak Moscow	1R	(Belgium) Club Brugge	3–1	3-1	6-2
1981–82	Spartak Moscow	2R	(West Germany) 1. FC Kaiserslautern	2-1	0-4	2-5
1981–82	Zenit Leningrad	1R	(East Germany) Dynamo Dresden	1-2	1-4	2-6
1982–83	Dynamo Moscow	1R	(Poland) Śląsk Wrocław	0-1	2-2	2-3
1982–83	Spartak Moscow	1R	(England) Arsenal	3–2	5-2	8-4
1982–83	Spartak Moscow	2R	(Netherlands) HFC Haarlem	2-0	3-1	5-1
1982–83	Spartak Moscow	3R	(Spain) Valencia	0-0	0-2	0-2
1983–84	Spartak Moscow	1R	(Finland) HJK	2-0	5-0	7-0
1983–84	Spartak Moscow	2R	(England) Aston Villa	2-2	2-1	4-3
1983–84	Spartak Moscow	3R	(Netherlands) Sparta Rotterdam	2-0	1-1	3-1
1983–84	Spartak Moscow	QF	(Belgium) Anderlecht	1-0	2-4	3-4
1984–85	Spartak Moscow	1R	(Denmark) OB	2-1	5-1	7-2
1984–85	Spartak Moscow	2R	(East Germany) Lokomotive Leipzig	2-0	1-1	3-1
1984–85	Spartak Moscow	3R	(West Germany) Köln	1-0	0-2	1-2
1985–86	Spartak Moscow	1R	(Finland) TPS	1-0	3-1	4-1
1985–86	Spartak Moscow	2R	(Belgium) Club Brugge	1-0	3-1	4-1
1985–86	Spartak Moscow	3R	(France) Nantes	0-1	1-1	1-2
1986–87	Spartak Moscow	1R	(Switzerland) Luzern	0-0	1-0	1-0
1986–87	Spartak Moscow	2R	(France) Toulouse	5-1	1-3	6-4
1986–87	Spartak Moscow	3R	(Austria) Swarovski Tirol	1-0	0-2	1-2
1987–88	Dynamo Moscow	1R	(Switzerland) Grasshopper	1-0	4-0	2-2
1987–88	Dynamo Moscow	2R	(Spain) Barcelona	0-0	0-2	0-2
1987–88	Spartak Moscow	1R	(East Germany) Dynamo Dresden	3–0	0-1	3-1
1987–88	Spartak Moscow	2R	(West Germany) Werder Bremen	4-1	2-6	6-7 (a.e.t.)
1987–88	Zenit Leningrad	1R	(Belgium) Club Brugge	2-0	0-5	2-5
1988–89	Torpedo Moscow	1R	(Sweden) Malmö FF	2-1	0-2	2-3 (a.e.t.)
1989–90	Spartak Moscow	1R	(Italy) Atalanta	2-0	0-0	0-2
1989–90	Spartak Moscow	2R	(West Germany) Köln	0-0	1-3	1-3
1989–90	Zenit Leningrad	1R	(Denmark) Næstved	3–1	0-0	3-1
1989–90	Zenit Leningrad	2R	(West Germany) Stuttgart	0-1	0-5	0-6
1990–91	Torpedo Moscow	1R	(Sweden) GAIS	4-1	1-1	5-2
1990–91	Torpedo Moscow	2R	(Spain) Sevilla	3-1	1-2	4-3
1990–91	Torpedo Moscow	3R	(France) Monaco	2-1	2-1	4-2
1990–91	Torpedo Moscow	QF	(Denmark) Brøndby	1-0	0-1	1-1 (4–2 p)
1991–92	Dynamo Moscow	1R	(Hungary) Váci Izzó MTE	4-1	0-1	4-2
1991–92	Dynamo Moscow	2R	(France) Cannes	1-1	1-0	2-1
1991–92	Dynamo Moscow	3R	(Belgium) Gent	0-0	0-2	0-2
1991–92	Spartak Moscow	1R	(Finland) MP	3–1	2-0	5-1
1991–92	Spartak Moscow	2R	(Greece) AEK Athens	0-0	1-2	1-2
1991–92	Torpedo Moscow	1R	(Germany) Hallescher FC	3-0	1-2	4-2
1991–92	Torpedo Moscow	2R	(Czechoslovakia) Sigma Olomouc	0-0	0-2	0-2
1992-93	Dynamo Moscow	1R	(Norway) Rosenborg	5-1	0-2	5-3
1992-93	Dynamo Moscow	2R	(Italy) Torino	0-0	2-1	2-1
1992-93	Dynamo Moscow	3R	(Portugal) Benfica	2-2	0-2	2-4
1992-93	Torpedo Moscow	1R	(England) Manchester United	0-0	0-0	0-0 (4–3 p)
1992-93	Torpedo Moscow	2R	(Spain) Real Madrid	3-2	2-5	5-7
1993–94	Dynamo Moscow	1R	(Germany) Eintracht Frankfurt	0-6	2-1	2-7
1993–94	Lokomotiv Moscow	1R	(Italy) Juventus	0-1	0-3	0-4
1993–94	Spartak Vladikavkaz	1R	(Germany) Borussia Dortmund	0-1	0-0	0-1
1994–95	Dynamo Moscow	1R	(Belgium) Seraing	0-1	4-3	4-4 (a)
1994–95	Dynamo Moscow	2R	(Spain) Real Madrid	2-2	0-4	2-6
1994–95	Rotor Volgograd	1R	(France) Nantes	3-2	0-3	3-5
1994–95	Tekstilshchik Kamyshin	1R	(Hungary) Békéscsaba	6-1	0-1	6-2
1994–95	Tekstilshchik Kamyshin	2R	(France) Nantes	1-2	0-2	1-4
1995–96	Lokomotiv Moscow	1R	(Germany) Bayern Munich	0-5	1-0	1-5
1995–96	Rotor Volgograd	1R	(England) Manchester United	0-0	2-2	2-2 (a)
1995–96	Rotor Volgograd	2R	(France) Bordeaux	0-1	1-2	1-3
1995–96	Spartak Vladikavkaz	1R	(England) Liverpool	1-2	0-0	1-2
1996–97	Alania Vladikavkaz	1R	(Belgium) Anderlecht	2-1	0-4	2-5
1996–97	CSKA Moscow	QR	(Iceland) ÍA	4-1	2-0	6-1
1996–97	CSKA Moscow	1R	(Netherlands) Feyenoord	1-1	0-1	1-2
1996–97	Dynamo Moscow	QR	(Finland) Jazz	1-1	3-1	4-2
1996–97	Dynamo Moscow	1R	(Italy) Roma	1-3	0-3	1-6
1996–97	Spartak Moscow	QR	Croatia Zagreb	2-0	1-3	3-3 (a)
1996–97	Spartak Moscow	1R	(Denmark) Silkeborg	3-2	2-1	5-3
1996–97	Spartak Moscow	2R	(Germany) Hamburg	2-2	0-3	2-5
1996–97	Torpedo Moscow	QR	(Croatia) Hajduk Split	2-0	0-1	2-1
1996–97	Torpedo Moscow	1R	(Georgia (country)) Dinamo Tbilisi	0-1	1-1	1-2
1997–98	Alania Vladikavkaz	2Q	(Ukraine) Dnipro Dnipropetrovsk	2-1	4-1	6-2
1997–98	Alania Vladikavkaz	1R	(Hungary) MTK	1-1	0-3	1-4
1997–98	Rotor Volgograd	2Q	(Poland) Odra Wodzisław	2-0	4-3	6-3
1997–98	Rotor Volgograd	1R	(Sweden) Örebro	2-0	4-1	6-1
1997–98	Rotor Volgograd	2R	(Italy) Lazio	0-0	0-3	0-3
1997–98	Spartak Moscow	1R	(Switzerland) Sion	5-1	1-0	6-1
1997–98	Spartak Moscow	2R	(Spain) Real Valladolid	2-0	2-1	4-1
1997–98	Spartak Moscow	3R	(Germany) Karlsruhe	1-0	0-0	1-0 (a.e.t.)
1997–98	Spartak Moscow	QF	(Netherlands) Ajax	1-0	3-1	4-1
1997–98	Spartak Moscow	SF	(Italy) Internazionale	1-2	1-2	2-4
1998-99	Dynamo Moscow	2Q	(Poland) Polonia Warsaw	1-0	1-0	2-0
1998-99	Dynamo Moscow	1R	(Latvia) Skonto	2-2	3-2	5-4
1998-99	Dynamo Moscow	2R	(Spain) Real Sociedad	2-3	0-3	2-6
1998-99	Rotor Volgograd	2Q	(Federal Republic of Yugoslavia) Red Star Belgrade	1-2	1-2	2-4
1999–00	Lokomotiv Moscow	1Q	(Belarus) BATE Borisov	5-0	7-1	12-1
1999–00	Lokomotiv Moscow	1R	(Denmark) Lyngby	3-0	2-1	5-1
1999–00	Lokomotiv Moscow	2R	(England) Leeds United	0-3	1-4	1-7
1999–00	Spartak Moscow	3R	(England) Leeds United	2-1	0-1	2-2 (a)
1999–00	Zenit Saint Petersburg	1R	(Italy) Bologna	0-3	2-2	2-5
2000–01	Alania Vladikavkaz	1R	(Poland) Amica Wronki	0-3	0-2	0-5
2000–01	CSKA Moscow	1R	(Denmark) Viborg	0-0	0-1	0-1
2000–01	Dynamo Moscow	1R	(Norway) Lillestrøm	2-1	1-3	3-4
2000–01	Lokomotiv Moscow	1R	(Bulgaria) Neftochimic Burgas	4-2	0-0	4-2
2000–01	Lokomotiv Moscow	2R	(Slovakia) Inter Slovnaft Bratislava	1-0	2-1	3-1
2000–01	Lokomotiv Moscow	3R	(Spain) Rayo Vallecano	0-0	0-2	0-2
2000–01	Torpedo Moscow	1R	(Switzerland) Lausanne-Sports	0-2	2-3	2-5
2001–02	Anzhi Makhachkala	1R	(Scotland) Rangers	0-1	-	0-1 (Note: Only one leg was played, in a neutral venue in Warsaw, Poland, due to security concerns in Russia.)
2001–02	Chernomorets Novorossiysk	1R	(Spain) Valencia	0-1	0-5	0-6
2001–02	Dynamo Moscow	1R	(Malta) Birkirkara	1-0	0-0	1-0
2001–02	Dynamo Moscow	2R	(Scotland) Rangers	1-4	1-3	2-7
2001–02	Lokomotiv Moscow	3R	(Israel) Hapoel Tel Aviv	0-1	1-2	1-3
2001–02	Torpedo Moscow	1R	(England) Ipswich Town	1-2	1-1	2-3
2002-03	CSKA Moscow	1R	(Italy) Parma	1-1	2-3	3-4
2002-03	Zenit Saint Petersburg	QR	(Andorra) Encamp	8-0	5-0	13-0
2002-03	Zenit Saint Petersburg	1R	(Switzerland) Grasshopper	2-1	1-3	3-4
2003-04	Spartak Moscow	1R	(Denmark) Esbjerg	2-0	1-1	3-1
2003-04	Spartak Moscow	2R	(Romania) Dinamo București	4-0	1-3	5-3
2003-04	Spartak Moscow	3R	(Spain) Mallorca	0-3	1-0	1-3
2003-04	Torpedo Moscow	QR	(San Marino) Domagnano	5-0	4-0	13-0
2003-04	Torpedo Moscow	1R	(Bulgaria) CSKA Sofia	1-1	1-1	2-2 (3-2 p)
2003-04	Torpedo Moscow	2R	(Spain) Villarreal	1-0	0-2	1-2
2004–05	CSKA Moscow	R32	(Portugal) Benfica	2-0	1-1	3-1
2004–05	CSKA Moscow	R16	(Serbia and Montenegro) Partizan	2-0	1-1	3-1
2004–05	CSKA Moscow	QF	(France) Auxerre	4-0	0-2	4-2
2004–05	CSKA Moscow	SF	(Italy) Parma	3-0	0-0	3-0
2004–05	CSKA Moscow	Final	(Portugal) Sporting CP	3-1		
2004–05	Rubin Kazan	2Q	(Austria) Rapid Wien	0-3	2-0	2-3
2004–05	Terek Grozny	2Q	(Poland) Lech Poznań	1-0	1-0	2-0
2004–05	Terek Grozny	1R	(Switzerland) Basel	1-1	0-2	1-3
2004–05	Zenit Saint Petersburg	2Q	(Austria) Superfund	2-0	1-3	3-3 (a)
2004–05	Zenit Saint Petersburg	1R	(Serbia and Montenegro) Red Star Belgrade	4-0	2-1	6-1
2004–05	Zenit Saint Petersburg	Group H	(Greece) AEK Athens	5–1	—N/a	4th
2004–05	Zenit Saint Petersburg	Group H	(France) Lille	—N/a	1-2	4th
2004–05	Zenit Saint Petersburg	Group H	(Spain) Sevilla	1-1	—N/a	4th
2004–05	Zenit Saint Petersburg	Group H	(Germany) Alemannia Aachen	—N/a	2–2	4th
2005–06	CSKA Moscow	1R	(Denmark) Midtjylland	3-1	3-1	6-2
2005–06	CSKA Moscow	Group F	(France) Marseille	1-2	—N/a	4th
2005–06	CSKA Moscow	Group F	(Netherlands) Heerenveen	—N/a	0-0	4th
2005–06	CSKA Moscow	Group F	(Bulgaria) Levski Sofia	2-1	—N/a	4th
2005–06	CSKA Moscow	Group F	(Romania) Dinamo București	—N/a	0-1	4th
2005–06	Krylia Sovetov Samara	2Q	(Belarus) BATE Borisov	2-0	2-0	4-0
2005–06	Krylia Sovetov Samara	1R	(Netherlands) AZ	5-3	1-3	6-6 (a)
2005–06	Lokomotiv Moscow	1R	(Norway) Brann	3-2	2-1	5-3
2005–06	Lokomotiv Moscow	Group B	(Spain) Espanyol	0–1	—N/a	3rd
2005–06	Lokomotiv Moscow	Group B	(Italy) Palermo	—N/a	0-0	3rd
2005–06	Lokomotiv Moscow	Group B	(Denmark) Brøndby	4-2	—N/a	3rd
2005–06	Lokomotiv Moscow	Group B	(Israel) Maccabi Petah Tikva	—N/a	0-4	3rd
2005–06	Lokomotiv Moscow	R32	(Spain) Sevilla	0-1	0-2	0-3
2005–06	Zenit Saint Petersburg	2Q	(Austria) Superfund	1-1	2-2	3-3 (a)
2005–06	Zenit Saint Petersburg	1R	(Greece) AEK Athens	0-0	1-0	1-0
2005–06	Zenit Saint Petersburg	Group H	(Portugal) Vitória de Guimarães	2–1	—N/a	2nd
2005–06	Zenit Saint Petersburg	Group H	(England) Bolton Wanderers	—N/a	0-1	2nd
2005–06	Zenit Saint Petersburg	Group H	(Spain) Sevilla	2-1	—N/a	2nd
2005–06	Zenit Saint Petersburg	Group H	(Turkey) Beşiktaş	—N/a	1-1	2nd
2005–06	Zenit Saint Petersburg	R32	(Norway) Rosenborg	2-1	2-0	4-1
2005–06	Zenit Saint Petersburg	R16	(France) Marseille	1-1	1-0	2-1
2005–06	Zenit Saint Petersburg	QF	(Spain) Sevilla	1-1	1-4	2-5
2006–07	CSKA Moscow	R32	(Israel) Maccabi Haifa	0-0	0-1	0-1
2006–07	Lokomotiv Moscow	1R	(Belgium) Zulte Waregem	2-1	0-2	2-3
2006–07	Spartak Moscow	R32	(Spain) Celta Vigo	1-1	1-2	2-3
2006–07	Rubin Kazan	2Q	(Belarus) BATE Borisov	3-0	2-0	5-0
2006–07	Rubin Kazan	1R	(Italy) Parma	0-1	0-1	0-2
2007-08	Lokomotiv Moscow	1R	(Denmark) Midtjylland	2-0	3-1	5-1
2007-08	Lokomotiv Moscow	Group B	(Spain) Atlético Madrid	3-3	—N/a	5th
2007-08	Lokomotiv Moscow	Group B	(Scotland) Aberdeen	—N/a	1-1	5th
2007-08	Lokomotiv Moscow	Group B	(Denmark) Copenhagen	0-1	—N/a	5th
2007-08	Lokomotiv Moscow	Group B	(Greece) Panathinaikos	—N/a	0-2	5th
2007-08	Spartak Moscow	1R	(Sweden) BK Häcken	5-0	3-1	8-1
2007-08	Spartak Moscow	Group E	(Germany) Bayer Leverkusen	2–1	—N/a	2nd
2007-08	Spartak Moscow	Group E	(Czech Republic) Sparta Prague	—N/a	0-0	2nd
2007-08	Spartak Moscow	Group E	(Switzerland) Zürich	1-0	—N/a	2nd
2007-08	Spartak Moscow	Group E	(France) Toulouse	—N/a	1-2	2nd
2007-08	Spartak Moscow	R32	(France) Marseille	2-0	0-3	2-3
2007-08	Zenit Saint Petersburg	2Q	(Slovakia) ViOn Zlaté Moravce	3-0	2-0	5-0
2007-08	Zenit Saint Petersburg	1R	(Belgium) Standard Liège	3-0	1-1	4-1
2007-08	Zenit Saint Petersburg	Group A	(Netherlands) AZ	1–1	—N/a	3rd
2007-08	Zenit Saint Petersburg	Group A	(Greece) AEL Larissa	—N/a	3-2	3rd
2007-08	Zenit Saint Petersburg	Group A	(Germany) 1. FC Nürnberg	2-2	—N/a	3rd
2007-08	Zenit Saint Petersburg	Group A	(England) Everton	—N/a	0-1	3rd
2007-08	Zenit Saint Petersburg	R32	(Spain) Villarreal	1-0	1-2	2-2 (a)
2007-08	Zenit Saint Petersburg	R16	(France) Marseille	2-0	1-3	3-3 (a)
2007-08	Zenit Saint Petersburg	QF	(Germany) Bayer Leverkusen	0-1	4-1	4-2
2007-08	Zenit Saint Petersburg	SF	(Germany) Bayern Munich	4-0	1-1	5-1
2007-08	Zenit Saint Petersburg	Final	(Scotland) Rangers	2-0		
2008–09	CSKA Moscow	1R	(Croatia) Slaven Belupo	1-0	2-1	3-1
2008–09	CSKA Moscow	Group H	(Spain) Deportivo La Coruña	3-0	—N/a	1st
2008–09	CSKA Moscow	Group H	(Netherlands) Feyenoord	—N/a	3-1	1st
2008–09	CSKA Moscow	Group H	(Poland) Lech Poznań	2-1	—N/a	1st
2008–09	CSKA Moscow	Group H	(France) Nancy	—N/a	4-3	1st
2008–09	CSKA Moscow	R32	(England) Aston Villa	2-0	1-1	3-1
2008–09	CSKA Moscow	R16	(Ukraine) Shakhtar Donetsk	1-0	0-2	1-2
2008–09	FC Moscow	2Q	(Poland) Legia Warsaw	2-0	2-1	4-1
2008–09	FC Moscow	1R	(Denmark) Copenhagen	1-2	1-1	2-3
2008–09	Spartak Moscow	1R	(Czech Republic) Baník Ostrava	1-1	1-0	2-1
2008–09	Spartak Moscow	Group D	(Italy) Udinese	1–2	—N/a	4th
2008–09	Spartak Moscow	Group D	(Croatia) Dinamo Zagreb	—N/a	1-0	4th
2008–09	Spartak Moscow	Group D	(Netherlands) NEC	1-2	—N/a	4th
2008–09	Spartak Moscow	Group D	(England) Tottenham Hotspur	—N/a	2-2	4th
2008–09	Zenit Saint Petersburg	R32	(Germany) VfB Stuttgart	2-1	2-1	4-2
2008–09	Zenit Saint Petersburg	R16	(Italy) Udinese	1-0	0-2	1-2
UEFA Europa League
2009-10	Amkar Perm	PO	(England) Fulham	1-0	1-3	2-3
2009-10	Dynamo Moscow	PO	(Bulgaria) CSKA Sofia	1-2	0-0	1-2
2009-10	Krylia Sovetov Samara	3R	(Republic of Ireland) St Patrick's Athletic	3-2	0-1	3-3 (a)
2009-10	Rubin Kazan	R32	(Israel) Hapoel Tel Aviv	3-0	0-0	3-0
2009-10	Rubin Kazan	R16	(Germany) VfL Wolfsburg	1-1	1-2	2-3 (a.e.t.)
2009-10	Zenit Saint Petersburg	PO	(Portugal) Nacional	1-1	3-4	4-5
2010-11	CSKA Moscow	PO	(Cyprus) Anorthosis Famagusta	4-0	2-1	6-1
2010-11	CSKA Moscow	Group F	(Czech Republic) Sparta Prague	3-0	1–1	1st
2010-11	CSKA Moscow	Group F	(Italy) Palermo	3-1	3-0	1st
2010-11	CSKA Moscow	Group F	(Switzerland) Lausanne-Sport	5–1	3-0	1st
2010-11	CSKA Moscow	R32	(Greece) PAOK	1-1	1-0	2-1
2010-11	CSKA Moscow	R16	(Portugal) Porto	1-2	0-1	1-3
2010-11	FC Lokomotiv Moscow	PO	(Switzerland) Lausanne-Sport	1-1	1-1	2-2 (3-4 p)
2010-11	Rubin Kazan	R32	(Netherlands) Twente	2-2	0-2	2-4
2010-11	Sibir Novosibirsk	3Q	(Cyprus) Apollon Limassol	1-0	1-2	2-2 (a)
2010-11	Sibir Novosibirsk	PO	(Netherlands) PSV Eindhoven	1-0	0-5	1-5
2010-11	Spartak Moscow	R32	(Switzerland) Basel	1-1	3-2	4-3
2010-11	Spartak Moscow	R16	(Netherlands) Ajax	3-0	1-0	4-0
2010-11	Spartak Moscow	QF	(Portugal) Porto	2-5	1-5	3-10
2010-11	Zenit Saint Petersburg	Group G	(Belgium) Anderlecht	3–1	3–1	1st
2010-11	Zenit Saint Petersburg	Group G	(Greece) AEK Athens	4-2	3-0	1st
2010-11	Zenit Saint Petersburg	Group G	(Croatia) Hajduk Split	2-0	3-2	1st
2010-11	Zenit Saint Petersburg	R32	(Switzerland) Young Boys	3-1	1-2	4-3
2010-11	Zenit Saint Petersburg	R16	(Netherlands) Twente	2-0	0-3	2-3
2011-12	Alania Vladikavkaz	3Q	(Kazakhstan) Aktobe	1-1	1-1	2-2 (4-2 p)
2011-12	Alania Vladikavkaz	PO	(Turkey) Beşiktaş	2-0	0-3	2-3
2011-12	Lokomotiv Moscow	PO	(Slovakia) Spartak Trnava	2-0	1-1	3-1
2011-12	Lokomotiv Moscow	Group L	(Belgium) Anderlecht	0-2	3-5	2nd
2011-12	Lokomotiv Moscow	Group L	(Greece) AEK Athens	3-1	3-1	2nd
2011-12	Lokomotiv Moscow	Group L	(Austria) Sturm Graz	3–1	2-1	2nd
2011-12	Lokomotiv Moscow	R32	(Spain) Athletic Bilbao	2-1	0-1	2-2 (a)
2011-12	Rubin Kazan	Group A	(Greece) PAOK	2-2	1–1	2nd
2011-12	Rubin Kazan	Group A	(England) Tottenham Hotspur	1-0	0-1	2nd
2011-12	Rubin Kazan	Group A	(Republic of Ireland) Shamrock Rovers	4–1	3-0	2nd
2011-12	Rubin Kazan	R32	(Greece) Olympiacos	0-1	0-1	0-2
2011-12	Spartak Moscow	PO	(Poland) Legia Warsaw	2-3	2-2	4-5
2012-13	Anzhi Makhachkala	2Q	(Hungary) Honvéd	1-0	4-0	5-0
2012-13	Anzhi Makhachkala	3Q	(Netherlands) Vitesse	2-0	2-0	4-0
2012-13	Anzhi Makhachkala	PO	(Netherlands) AZ	1-0	5-0	6-0
2012-13	Anzhi Makhachkala	Group A	(England) Liverpool	1-0	0–1	2nd
2012-13	Anzhi Makhachkala	Group A	(Switzerland) Young Boys	2-0	1-3	2nd
2012-13	Anzhi Makhachkala	Group A	(Italy) Udinese	2-0	1-1	2nd
2012-13	Anzhi Makhachkala	R32	(Germany) Hannover 96	3-1	1-1	4-2
2012-13	Anzhi Makhachkala	R16	(England) Newcastle United	0-0	0-1	0-1
2012-13	CSKA Moscow	PO	(Sweden) AIK	0-2	1-0	1-2
2012-13	Dynamo Moscow	3Q	(Scotland) Dundee United	5-0	2-2	7-2
2012-13	Dynamo Moscow	PO	(Germany) VfB Stuttgart	1-1	0-2	1-3
2012-13	Rubin Kazan	Group H	(Italy) Internazionale	3-0	2-2	1st
2012-13	Rubin Kazan	Group H	(Serbia) Partizan	2-0	1-1	1st
2012-13	Rubin Kazan	Group H	(Azerbaijan) Neftçi	1-0	1-0	1st
2012-13	Rubin Kazan	R32	(Spain) Atlético Madrid	0-1	2-0	2-1
2012-13	Rubin Kazan	R16	(Spain) Levante	2-0	0-0	2-0 (a.e.t.)
2012-13	Rubin Kazan	QF	(England) Chelsea	3-2	1-3	4-5
2012-13	Zenit Saint Petersburg	R32	(England) Liverpool	2-0	1-3	3-3 (a)
2012-13	Zenit Saint Petersburg	R16	(Switzerland) Basel	1-0	0-2	1-2
2013-14	Anzhi Makhachkala	Group K	(England) Tottenham Hotspur	0-2	1-4	2nd
2013-14	Anzhi Makhachkala	Group K	(Moldova) Sheriff Tiraspol	1-1	0-0	2nd
2013-14	Anzhi Makhachkala	Group K	(Norway) Tromsø	1-0	1-0	2nd
2013-14	Anzhi Makhachkala	R32	(Belgium) Genk	0-0	2-0	2-0
2013-14	Anzhi Makhachkala	R16	(Netherlands) AZ	0-0	0-1	0-1
2013-14	Kuban Krasnodar	3Q	(Scotland) Motherwell	1-0	2-0	3-0
2013-14	Kuban Krasnodar	PO	(Netherlands) Feyenoord	1-0	2-1	3-1
2013-14	Kuban Krasnodar	Group A	(Spain) Valencia	0-2	1-1	3rd
2013-14	Kuban Krasnodar	Group A	(England) Swansea City	1-1	1-1	3rd
2013-14	Kuban Krasnodar	Group A	(Switzerland) St. Gallen	4-0	0-2	3rd
2013-14	Rubin Kazan	2Q	(Serbia) Jagodina	1-0	3-2	4-2
2013-14	Rubin Kazan	3Q	(Denmark) Randers	2-0	2-1	4-1
2013-14	Rubin Kazan	PO	(Norway) Molde	3-0	2-0	5-0
2013-14	Rubin Kazan	Group D	(Slovenia) Maribor	1-1	5-2	1st
2013-14	Rubin Kazan	Group D	(Belgium) Zulte Waregem	4-0	2-0	1st
2013-14	Rubin Kazan	Group D	(England) Wigan Athletic	1-0	1-1	1st
2013-14	Rubin Kazan	R32	(Spain) Real Betis	0-2	1-1	1-3
2013-14	Spartak Moscow	PO	(Switzerland) St. Gallen	2-4	1-1	3-5
2014-15	Dynamo Moscow	3Q	(Israel) Ironi Kiryat Shmona	1-1	2-1	3-2
2014-15	Dynamo Moscow	PO	(Cyprus) Omonia	2-2	2-1	4-3
2014-15	Dynamo Moscow	Group E	(Netherlands) PSV Eindhoven	1-0	1-0	1st
2014-15	Dynamo Moscow	Group E	(Portugal) Estoril	1-0	2-1	1st
2014-15	Dynamo Moscow	Group E	(Greece) Panathinaikos	2-1	2-1	1st
2014-15	Dynamo Moscow	R32	(Belgium) Anderlecht	3-1	0-0	3-1
2014-15	Dynamo Moscow	R16	(Italy) Napoli	0-0	1-3	1-3
2014-15	Krasnodar	2Q	(Estonia) Sillamäe Kalev	5-0	4-0	9-0
2014-15	Krasnodar	3Q	(Hungary) Diósgyőr	3-0	5-1	8-1
2014-15	Krasnodar	PO	(Spain) Real Sociedad	3-0	0-1	3-1
2014-15	Krasnodar	Group H	(England) Everton	1-1	1-0	3rd
2014-15	Krasnodar	Group H	(Germany) Wolfsburg	2-4	1-5	3rd
2014-15	Krasnodar	Group H	(France) Lille	1-1	1-1	3rd
2014-15	Lokomotiv Moscow	PO	(Cyprus) Apollon Limassol	1-4	1-1	2-5
2014-15	Rostov	PO	(Turkey) Trabzonspor	1-1	0-2	1-3
2014-15	Zenit Saint Petersburg	R32	(Netherlands) PSV Eindhoven	3-0	1-0	4-0
2014-15	Zenit Saint Petersburg	R16	(Italy) Torino	2-0	0-1	2-1
2014-15	Zenit Saint Petersburg	QF	(Spain) Sevilla	2-2	1-2	3-4
2015-16	Krasnodar	3Q	(Slovakia) Slovan Bratislava	2-0	3-3	5-3
2015-16	Krasnodar	PO	(Finland) HJK	5-1	0-0	5-1
2015-16	Krasnodar	Group C	(Germany) Borussia Dortmund	1-0	1-2	1st
2015-16	Krasnodar	Group C	(Greece) PAOK	2-1	0-0	1st
2015-16	Krasnodar	Group C	(Azerbaijan) Gabala	2-1	3-0	1st
2015-16	Krasnodar	R32	(Czech Republic) Sparta Prague	0-3	0-1	0-4
2015-16	Lokomotiv Moscow	Group H	(Portugal) Sporting CP	2-4	3-1	1st
2015-16	Lokomotiv Moscow	Group H	(Turkey) Beşiktaş	1-1	1-1	1st
2015-16	Lokomotiv Moscow	Group H	(Albania) Skënderbeu	2-0	3-0	1st
2015-16	Lokomotiv Moscow	R32	(Turkey) Fenerbahçe	1-1	0-2	1-3
2015-16	Rubin Kazan	3Q	(Austria) Sturm Graz	1-1	3-2	4-3
2015-16	Rubin Kazan	PO	(North Macedonia) Rabotnicki	1-0	1-1	2-1
2015-16	Rubin Kazan	Group B	(England) Liverpool	0-1	1-1	3rd
2015-16	Rubin Kazan	Group B	(Switzerland) Sion	2-0	1-2	3rd
2015-16	Rubin Kazan	Group B	(France) Bordeaux	0-0	2-2	3rd
2016-17	Krasnodar	3Q	(Malta) Birkirkara	3-1	3-0	6-1
2016-17	Krasnodar	PO	(Albania) Partizani	4-0	0-0	4-0
2016-17	Krasnodar	Group I	(Germany) Schalke 04	0-1	0-2	2nd
2016-17	Krasnodar	Group I	(Austria) Red Bull Salzburg	1-1	1-0	2nd
2016-17	Krasnodar	Group I	(France) Nice	5-2	1-2	2nd
2016-17	Krasnodar	R32	(Turkey) Fenerbahçe	1-0	1-1	2-1
2016-17	Krasnodar	R16	(Spain) Celta Vigo	0-2	1-2	1-4
2016-17	Rostov	R32	(Czech Republic) Sparta Prague	4-0	1-1	5-1
2016-17	Rostov	R16	(England) Manchester United	1-1	0-1	1-2
2016-17	Spartak Moscow	3Q	(Cyprus) AEK Larnaca	0-1	1-1	1-2
2016-17	Zenit Saint Petersburg	Group D	(Netherlands) AZ	5-0	2-3	1st
2016-17	Zenit Saint Petersburg	Group D	(Israel) Maccabi Tel Aviv	2-0	4-3	1st
2016-17	Zenit Saint Petersburg	Group D	(Republic of Ireland) Dundalk	2-1	2-1	1st
2016-17	Zenit Saint Petersburg	R32	(Belgium) Anderlecht	3-1	0-2	3-3 (a)
2017-18	CSKA Moscow	R32	(Serbia) Red Star Belgrade	1-0	0-0	1-0
2017-18	CSKA Moscow	R16	(France) Lyon	3-2	0-1	3-3 (a)
2017-18	CSKA Moscow	QF	(England) Arsenal	2-2	1-4	3-6
2017-18	Krasnodar	3Q	(Denmark) Lyngby	2-1	3-1	5-2
2017-18	Krasnodar	PO	(Serbia) Red Star Belgrade	3-2	1-2	4-4 (a)
2017-18	Lokomotiv Moscow	Group F	(Denmark) Copenhagen	2-1	0-0	1st
2017-18	Lokomotiv Moscow	Group F	(Moldova) Sheriff Tiraspol	1-2	1-1	1st
2017-18	Lokomotiv Moscow	Group F	(Czech Republic) Fastav Zlín	3-0	2-0	1st
2017-18	Lokomotiv Moscow	R32	(France) Nice	1-0	3-2	4-2
2017-18	Lokomotiv Moscow	R16	(Spain) Atlético Madrid	1-5	0-3	1-8
2017-18	Spartak Moscow	R32	(Spain) Athletic Bilbao	1-3	2-1	3-4
2017-18	Zenit Saint Petersburg	3Q	(Israel) Bnei Yehuda	0-1	2-0	2-1
2017-18	Zenit Saint Petersburg	PO	(Netherlands) Utrecht	2-0	0-1	2-1 (a.e.t.)
2017-18	Zenit Saint Petersburg	Group L	(Spain) Real Sociedad	3-1	3-1	1st
2017-18	Zenit Saint Petersburg	Group L	(Norway) Rosenborg	3-1	1-1	1st
2017-18	Zenit Saint Petersburg	Group L	(North Macedonia) Vardar	2-1	5-0	1st
2017-18	Zenit Saint Petersburg	R32	(Scotland) Celtic	3-0	0-1	3-1
2017-18	Zenit Saint Petersburg	R16	(Germany) RB Leipzig	1-1	1-2	2-3
2018-19	Krasnodar	Group J	(Spain) Sevilla	2-1	0-3	2nd
2018-19	Krasnodar	Group J	(Belgium) Standard Liège	2-1	1-2	2nd
2018-19	Krasnodar	Group J	(Turkey) Akhisarspor	2-1	1-0	2nd
2018-19	Krasnodar	R32	(Germany) Bayer Leverkusen	0-0	1-1	1-1 (a)
2018-19	Krasnodar	R16	(Spain) Valencia	1-1	1-2	2-3
2018-19	Spartak Moscow	Group G	(Spain) Villarreal	3-3	0-2	4th
2018-19	Spartak Moscow	Group G	(Austria) Rapid Wien	1-2	0-2	4th
2018-19	Spartak Moscow	Group G	(Scotland) Rangers	4-3	0-0	4th
2018-19	Ufa	2Q	(Slovenia) Domžale	0-0	1-1	1-1 (a)
2018-19	Ufa	3Q	(Luxembourg) Progrès Niederkorn	2-1	2-2	4-3
2018-19	Ufa	PO	(Scotland) Rangers	1-1	0-1	1-2
2018-19	Zenit Saint Petersburg	3Q	(Belarus) Dinamo Minsk	8-1	0-4	8-5 (a.e.t.)
2018-19	Zenit Saint Petersburg	PO	(Norway) Molde	3-1	1-2	4-3
2018-19	Zenit Saint Petersburg	Group C	(Czech Republic) Slavia Prague	1-0	0-2	1st
2018-19	Zenit Saint Petersburg	Group C	(France) Bordeaux	2-1	1-1	1st
2018-19	Zenit Saint Petersburg	Group C	(Denmark) Copenhagen	1-0	1-1	1st
2018-19	Zenit Saint Petersburg	R32	(Turkey) Fenerbahçe	3-1	0-1	3-2
2018-19	Zenit Saint Petersburg	R16	(Spain) Villarreal	1-3	1-2	2-5
2019-20	Arsenal Tula	2Q	(Azerbaijan) Neftçi	0-1	0-3	0-4
2019-20	CSKA Moscow	Group H	(Spain) Espanyol	0-2	1-0	4th
2019-20	CSKA Moscow	Group H	(Bulgaria) Ludogorets Razgrad	1-1	1-5	4th
2019-20	CSKA Moscow	Group H	(Hungary) Ferencváros	0-1	0-0	4th
2019-20	Krasnodar	Group C	(Switzerland) Basel	1-0	0-5	3rd
2019-20	Krasnodar	Group C	(Spain) Getafe	1-2	0-3	3rd
2019-20	Krasnodar	Group C	(Turkey) Trabzonspor	3-1	2-0	3rd
2019-20	Spartak Moscow	3Q	(Switzerland) Thun	2-1	3-2	5-3
2019-20	Spartak Moscow	PO	(Portugal) Braga	1-2	0-1	1-3
2020-21	CSKA Moscow	Group K	(Croatia) Dinamo Zagreb	0-0	1-3	4th
2020-21	CSKA Moscow	Group K	(Austria) Wolfsberger AC	0-1	1-1	4th
2020-21	CSKA Moscow	Group K	(Netherlands) Feyenoord	0-0	1-3	4th
2020-21	Dynamo Moscow	2Q	(Georgia (country)) Locomotive Tbilisi	—N/a	1-2	—N/a
2020-21	Krasnodar	R32	(Croatia) Dinamo Zagreb	2-3	0-1	2-4
2020-21	Rostov	3Q	(Israel) Maccabi Haifa	1-2	—N/a	—N/a
2021-22	Lokomotiv Moscow	Group E	(Turkey) Galatasaray	0–1	1–1	4th
2021-22	Lokomotiv Moscow	Group E	(Italy) Lazio	0–3	0–2	4th
2021-22	Lokomotiv Moscow	Group E	(France) Marseille	1–1	0–1	4th
2021-22	Spartak Moscow	Group C	(Italy) Napoli	3–2	2–1	1st
2021-22	Spartak Moscow	Group C	(England) Leicester City	3–4	1–1	1st
2021-22	Spartak Moscow	Group C	(Poland) Legia Warsaw	0–1	1–0	1st
2021-22	Spartak Moscow	R16	(Germany) RB Leipzig	Excluded (Note: Spartak Moscow, as well as other Russian clubs and national teams, were excluded from all competitions organized by UEFA and FIFA due to the 2022 Russian invasion of Ukraine.)		
2021-22	Zenit Saint Petersburg	KPO	(Spain) Real Betis	2–3	0–0	2–3

=== UEFA Europa Conference League ===
As of 22 february 2023

Season	Club	Round	Opponent	Home	Away	Aggregate
2021-22	Sochi	2QR	(Azerbaijan) Keşla	3–0	4–2	7–2
2021-22	Sochi	3QR	(Serbia) Partizan	1–1	2–2 (a.e.t.)	3–3 (2–4 p)
2021-22	Rubin Kazan	3QR	(Poland) Raków Częstochowa	0–1 (a.e.t.)	0–0	0–1

== Defunct competitions ==
=== UEFA Cup Winners' Cup ===
Season	Club	Round	Opponent	Home	Away	Aggregate
1966-67	Spartak Moscow	1R	(Socialist Federal Republic of Yugoslavia) OFK Beograd	3–0	3–1	6–1
1966-67	Spartak Moscow	2R	(Austria) Rapid Wien	1–1	0–1	1–2
1967-68	Torpedo Moscow	1R	(East Germany) BSG Sachsenring Zwickau	0–0	1–0	1–0
1967-68	Torpedo Moscow	2R	(Czechoslovakia) Spartak Trnava	3–0	3–1	6–1
1967-68	Torpedo Moscow	QF	(Wales) Cardiff City	1–0	0–1	1–1*
1969-70	Torpedo Moscow	PR	(Austria) Rapid Wien	0–0	1–1	1–1*
1971-72	Dynamo Moscow	1R	(Greece) Olympiacos	2–0	2–1	3–2
1971-72	Dynamo Moscow	2R	(Turkey) Eskişehirspor	1–0	1–0	2–0
1971-72	Dynamo Moscow	QF	(Socialist Federal Republic of Yugoslavia) Red Star Belgrade	2–1	1–1	3–2
1971-72	Dynamo Moscow	SF	(East Germany) BFC Dynamo	1–1	1–1	2–2 (1–4 p)
1971-72	Dynamo Moscow	F	(Scotland) Rangers	3–2		
1972-73	Spartak Moscow	1R	(Netherlands) FC Den Haag	1–0	0–0	1–0
1972-73	Spartak Moscow	2R	(Spain) Atlético Madrid	4–3	2–1	5–5*
1972-73	Spartak Moscow	QF	(Italy) Milan	0–1	1–1	1–2
1973-74	Torpedo Moscow	1R	(Spain) Athletic Bilbao	0–0	0–2	0–2
1977-78	Dynamo Moscow	1R	(Malta) Valletta	5–0	2–0	7–0
1977-78	Dynamo Moscow	2R	(Romania) Universitatea Craiova	2–0	0–2	2–2 (3–0 p)
1977-78	Dynamo Moscow	QF	(Spain) Real Betis	3–0	0–0	3–0
1977-78	Dynamo Moscow	SF	Austria Wien	2–1	1–2	3–3 (4–5 p)
1979-80	Dynamo Moscow	1R	(Albania) Vllaznia Shkodër			
1979-80	Dynamo Moscow	2R	(Portugal) Boavista			
1979-80	Dynamo Moscow	QF	(France) Nantes			
1981-82	SKA Rostov	1R	(Turkey) Ankaragücü			
1981-82	SKA Rostov	2R	(Germany) Eintracht Frankfurt			
1982-83	Torpedo Moscow	1R	(Germany) Bayern Munich			
1984-85	Dynamo Moscow	1R	(Socialist Federal Republic of Yugoslavia) Hajduk Split			
1984-85	Dynamo Moscow	2R	(Malta) Ħamrun Spartans			
1984-85	Dynamo Moscow	QF	(Greece) AEL			
1984-85	Dynamo Moscow	SF	(Austria) Rapid Wien			

=== UEFA Intertoto Cup ===
Season	Club	Round	Opponent	Home	Away	Aggregate
1995
1996
1997
1998
1999
2000
2001
2002
2003
2003
2004	FC Spartak Moscow	1R	(Lithuania) Atlantas	2–0	0–1	2–1
2004	FC Spartak Moscow	2R	(Croatia) Kamen Ingrad	4–1	1–0	5–1
2004	FC Spartak Moscow	3R	(Spain) Villarreal	2–2	0–1	2–3
2004	FC Shinnik Yaroslavl	2R	(Czech Republic) Teplice	2–1	2–0	4–1
2004	FC Shinnik Yaroslavl	3R	(Portugal) União de Leiria	1–4	1–2	2–6
2005	Did not participate^{1}					
2006	FC Moscow	2R	(Belarus) MTZ-RIPO Minsk	2–0	1–0	3–0
2006	FC Moscow	3R	(Germany) Hertha BSC	0–2	0–0	0–2
2007	FC Rubin Kazan	2R	(Hungary) Zalaegerszeg	2–0	3–0	5–0
2007	FC Rubin Kazan	3R	(Austria) Rapid Vienna	1–3	0–0	1–3
2008	Saturn Moscow Oblast	2R	(Luxembourg) Etzella Ettelbruck	7–0	1–1	8–1
2008	Saturn Moscow Oblast	3R	(Germany) Stuttgart	1–0	0–3 (a.e.t.)	1–3

Notes

- Note 1: No club was selected by the Russian Football Union to participate in the tournament during that season.

== UEFA coefficient and ranking ==
For the 2025–26 UEFA competitions, the associations were allocated places according to their 2024 UEFA country coefficients, which take into account their performance in European competitions from 2019–20 to 2023–24. In the 2024 rankings used for the 2025–26 European competitions, Russia's coefficient points total is 22.965 and is ranked by UEFA as the 22nd best association in Europe out of 55. Due to the 2022 Russian invasion of Ukraine, however, Russian clubs are excluded from participating in the 2025-26 UEFA competitions.

- 20 Croatia 25.525
- 21 Poland 25.375
- 22 Russia 22.965
- 23 Cyprus 22.100
- 24 Hungary 21.875
  - Full list

=== UEFA country coefficient history ===
As of 19 August 2025, Source UEFA

Accumulated	Valid	Rank	Movement	Coefficient	Change
2002–03 to 2006–07	2008–09	9		36.125	
2003–04 to 2007–08	2009–10	6	▲ +3	43.750	▲ +7.625
2004–05 to 2008–09	2010–11	6	Steady	47.625	▲ +3.875
2005–06 to 2009–10	2011–12	6	Steady	43.791	▼ –3.834
2006–07 to 2010–11	2012–13	7	▼ –1	44.707	▲ +0.916
2007–08 to 2011–12	2013–14	7	Steady	47.832	▲ +3.125
2008–09 to 2012–13	2014–15	8	▼ –1	46.332	▼ –1.500
2009–10 to 2013–14	2015–16	7	▲ +1	46.998	▲ +0.667
2010–11 to 2014–15	2016–17	7	Steady	50.498	▲ +3.500
2011–12 to 2015–16	2017–18	7	Steady	51.082	▲ +0.584
2012–13 to 2016–17	2018–19	6	▲ +1	50.532	▼ –0.550
2013–14 to 2017–18	2019–20	6	Steady	53.382	▲ +2.850
2014–15 to 2018–19	2020–21	6	Steady	50.549	▼ –2.833
2015–16 to 2019–20	2021–22	7	▼ –1	45.549	▼ –5.000
2016–17 to 2020–21	2022–23	8	▼ –1	38.382	▼ –7.167
2017–18 to 2021–22	2023–24	10	▼ –2	34.482	▼ –3.900
2018–19 to 2022–23	2024–25	18	▼ –8	26.215	▼ –8.267
2019–20 to 2023–24	2025–26	22	▼ –5	22.965	▼ –3.250
2020–21 to 2024–25	2026–27	26	▼ –4	22.632	▼ –0.333

Notes

1. On 28 February 2022, Russian football clubs and national teams were suspended from FIFA and UEFA competitions due to the 2022 Russian invasion of Ukraine. On 2 May 2022, UEFA confirmed that Russian clubs would be excluded from the 2022–23 UEFA competitions and be awarded the minimum coefficient from the previous 5 seasons (4.333) for 2022–23.
