= Matthias Müller (footballer) =

German footballer (born 1954)

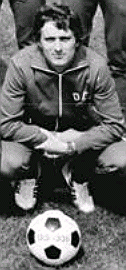
- Mueller in 1980

Personal information
- Date of birth: 18 October 1954 (age 72)
- Place of birth: Dresden, East Germany
- Position: Full-back

Senior career*
Years	Team	Apps	(Gls)
1973–1981	SG Dynamo Dresden	90	(11)
1981–1983	TSG Meißen		
1983–1986	Fortschritt Neustadt		
1986–1989	Aktivist Brieske-Senftenberg		
1989–1990	TSG Elsterwerda		
1990	Tennis Borussia Berlin		

International career
1980	East Germany	4	(0)

Managerial career
- 2008–: Bischofswerdaer FV
Medal record
Representing SG Dynamo Dresden
Silver medal – second place	FDGB Pokal	1974
Silver medal – second place	FDGB Pokal	1975
Gold medal – first place	DDR-Oberliga	1976
Gold medal – first place	DDR-Oberliga	1977
Gold medal – first place	FDGB-Pokal	1977
Gold medal – first place	DDR-Oberliga	1978
Silver medal – second place	FDGB Pokal	1978
Representing East Germany
Silver medal – second place	Olympic Football	1980
- * Club domestic league appearances and goals

Matthias Müller (born 18 October 1954) is a German former professional footballer who played as a full-back.

== Career ==
Müller began his career with his hometown club, Dynamo Dresden, where he established himself in the first-team, playing at full-back as the team won three East German titles and one cup. Müller represented East Germany at most levels of youth football, and won four caps for the senior team in 1980. He was also part of the squad that won the silver medal at the 1980 Summer Olympics.

In January 1981, prior to a national team tour of South America, Müller and Dresden teammates Peter Kotte and Gerd Weber were arrested at Berlin-Schönefeld Airport by the Stasi for plotting to escape to the west. Weber was given a prison sentence, but Kotte and Müller were released, but banned from playing at the top level of East German football.

Müller played out the rest of the 1980s with a succession of lower league clubs. After reunification he had a brief stint with Tennis Borussia Berlin, before retiring. He now works as a coach.
