= 1974–75 FDGB-Pokal =

Tournament details
- Country: East Germany

Final positions
- Champions: BSG Sachsenring Zwickau
- Runners-up: Dynamo Dresden

The 1974–75 season saw the 24th competition for the FDGB-Pokal.

89 teams participated. After a qualifying round pitting 6 clubs from the second-tier DDR-Liga against each other, the first round and an additional intermediate round were played with 55 teams from the 1973-74 DDR-Liga, the teams relegated from the first-tier DDR-Oberliga after the 1973-74 season and the 15 winners of the various 1973-74 Bezirkspokal competitions.

By the round of the last 16, all Bezirkspokal winners had been eliminated, and only two second-tier teams, 1. FC Union Berlin and Motor Nordhausen remained in the competition. As had been done in the past two competitions, fixtures were played over two legs from the round of 16 to the semifinals.

The semifinal saw a repeat of last year's final, with Dynamo Dresden and FC Carl Zeiss Jena playing each other. Dresden won through and met BSG Sachsenring Zwickau who had beaten BSG Wismut Aue in the semifinal. For the first time since 1950 the final was held in East Berlin's Stadion der Weltjugend. For the first time ever an FDGB-Pokal final was decided on penalties.

== Preliminary round ==
| Home team | Away team | Result |
|---|---|---|
| BSG Stahl Maxhütte | 1. FC Lokomotive Leipzig II | 0 – 8 |
| FC Karl-Marx-Stadt II | ASG Vorwärts Plauen | 3 – 1 a.e.t. |
| BSG Aktivist Schwarze Pumpe | SG Dynamo Fürstenwalde | 4 – 0 |

== Round 1 ==
| Home team | Away team | Result |
|---|---|---|
| 1. FC Union Berlin II | BSG Aufbau Schwedt | 4 – 0 |
| SG Dynamo Lübben | BSG EAB 47 Lichtenberg Berlin | 2 – 1 aet |
| BSG WaMa Görlitz | SG Dynamo Dresden II | 1 – 5 |
| BSG Lokomotive Erfurt | BSG Motor Steinach | 2 – 1 |
| BSG Aufbau Eisenhüttenstadt | BSG Motor Eberswalde | 0 – 1 aet |
| FC Carl Zeiss Jena III | FC Rot-Weiß Erfurt II | 1 – 0 |
| SG Dynamo Eisleben | BSG Zentronik Sömmerda | 2 – 1 |
| BSG Fortschritt Krumhermersdorf | FSV Lokomotive Dresden | 1 – 2 |
| SC DHfK Leipzig | BSG Wismut Gera | 2 – 4 aet |
| BSG Stahl Blankenburg | 1. FC Magdeburg II | 1 – 5 aet |
| BSG Lokomotive Malchin | BSG Post Neubrandenburg | 2 – 1 |
| BSG Motor Hennigsdorf | BSG Stahl Eisenhüttenstadt | 3 – 2 |
| BSG Lokomotive Bergen | FC Hansa Rostock II | 1 – 2 |
| BSG Aufbau Boitzenburg | SG Dynamo Schwerin | 1 – 2 |
| BSG Aktivist Kali Werra Tiefenort | BSG Motor Ernst Thälmann Suhl | 4 – 0 |
| ASG Vorwärts Neubrandenburg | FC Vorwärts Frankfurt/Oder II | 1 – 5 |
| BSG Demminer Verkehrsbetriebe | Berliner FC Dynamo II | 0 – 5 |
| BSG Motor Schwerin | BSG Stahl Brandenburg | 1 – 4 |
| BSG Motor Köpenick Berlin | BSG Chemie Veritas Wittenberge | 0 – 2 |
| BSG Rotation 1950 Leipzig | BSG Chemie Zeitz | 4 – 4 aet, 4 – 3 pen |
| BSG Chemie Wolfen | BSG Motor Germania Karl-Marx-Stadt | 2 – 4 |
| TSG Bau Rostock | TSG Wismar | 2 – 3 |
| ASG Vorwärts Löbau | TSG Gröditz | 2 – 1 |
| BSG Motor Eisenach | BSG Lokomotive/Vorwärts Halberstadt | 2 – 3 aet |
| BSG Chemie Schwarza | BSG Sachsenring Zwickau II | 2 – 0 |
| BSG Motor Schönebeck | BSG Motor Babelsberg | 1 – 5 |
| BSG Lokomotive Stendal | BSG Stahl Hennigsdorf | 1 – 0 |
| FC Energie Cottbus | ASG Vorwärts Dessau | 1 – 0 |
| BSG Motor Nordhausen West | BSG Chemie Buna Schkopau | 5 – 2 |
| ASG Vorwärts Kamenz | BSG Motor Werdau | 3 – 1 |
| BSG KKW Nord Greifswald | 1. FC Union Berlin | 3 – 3 aet, 4 – 5 pen |
| BSG Einheit Güstrow | BSG Schiffahrt/Hafen Rostock | 3 – 1 |
| BSG Stahl Riesa II | FC Carl Zeiss Jena II | 3 – 1 |
| 1. FC Lokomotive Leipzig II | BSG Chemie Leipzig | 4 – 5 |
| FC Karl-Marx-Stadt II | BSG Chemie Böhlen | 1 – 2 |
| BSG Aktivist Schwarze Pumpe | BSG Akt. Brieske/Senftenberg | 3 – 0 |

== Intermediate round ==
| Home team | Away team | Result |
|---|---|---|
| BSG Lokomotive Malchin | FC Hansa Rostock II | 0 – 1 |
| BSG Einheit Güstrow | TSG Wismar | 3 – 1 |
| BSG Chemie Veritas Wittenberge | SG Dynamo Schwerin | 1 – 2 |
| BSG Rotation 1950 Leipzig | BSG Lokomotive Stendal | 3 – 2 |
| BSG Lokomotive/Vorwärts Halberstadt | BSG Chemie Leipzig | 0 – 4 |
| 1. FC Magdeburg II | SG Dynamo Eisleben | 3 – 2 |
| BSG Stahl Brandenburg | BSG Chemie Böhlen | 1 – 1 aet, 5 – 6 pen |
| FC Carl Zeiss Jena III | BSG Motor Nordhausen West | 0 – 3 |
| BSG Lokomotive Erfurt | BSG Aktivist Kali Werra Tiefenort | 2 – 1 |
| BSG Chemie Schwarza | BSG Wismut Gera | 0 – 1 |
| 1. FC Union Berlin II | BSG Motor Babelsberg | 3 – 2 |
| SG Dynamo Lübben | FC Vorwärts Frankfurt/Oder II | 0 – 2 |
| BSG Motor Eberswalde | Berliner FC Dynamo II | 1 – 2 |
| BSG Motor Hennigsdorf | 1. FC Union Berlin | 0 – 4 |
| BSG Stahl Riesa II | BSG Aktivist Schwarze Pumpe | 1 – 0 |
| ASG Vorwärts Löbau | FSV Lokomotive Dresden | 4 – 1 |
| ASG Vorwärts Kamenz | FC Energie Cottbus | 0 – 2 |
| BSG Motor Germania Karl-Marx-Stadt | SG Dynamo Dresden II | 1 – 2 |

== Round 2 ==
| Home team | Away team | Result |
|---|---|---|
| FC Energie Cottbus | SG Dynamo Dresden | 1 – 2 aet |
| FC Hansa Rostock II | 1. FC Magdeburg | 1 – 2 |
| BSG Motor Nordhausen West | BSG Chemie Leipzig | 2 – 0 |
| ASG Vorwärts Löbau | FC Karl-Marx-Stadt | 0 – 1^{*} |
| 1. FC Magdeburg II | FC Vorwärts Frankfurt/Oder | 0 – 2 |
| BSG Chemie Böhlen | BSG Wismut Aue | 1 – 3 |
| BSG Lokomotive Erfurt | FC Carl Zeiss Jena | 0 – 2 |
| BSG Stahl Riesa II | 1. FC Lokomotive Leipzig | 0 – 5 |
| Berliner FC Dynamo II | FC Hansa Rostock | 0 – 4 |
| BSG Einheit Güstrow | Berliner FC Dynamo | 0 – 4 |
| FC Vorwärts Frankfurt/Oder II | BSG Stahl Riesa | 0 – 2 |
| SG Dynamo Dresden II | FC Rot-Weiß Erfurt | 0 – 2 |
| SG Dynamo Schwerin | ASG Vorwärts Stralsund | 2 – 4 |
| BSG Rotation 1950 Leipzig | BSG Sachsenring Zwickau | 1 – 3 |
| 1. FC Union Berlin II | Hallescher FC Chemie | 0 – 3 |
| BSG Wismut Gera | 1. FC Union Berlin | 0 – 3 |

^* The match was counted as a loss for FCK as they had fielded an ineligible player. However, as Löbau failed to spot the infraction while reviewing the opposition's lineup as is customary, they were not awarded a win. Neither team progressed.

== Last 16 ==
| SG Dynamo Dresden – 1. FC Magdeburg | 3 – 3, 1 – 0 |
| BSG Wismut Aue – Hallescher FC Chemie | 4 – 0, 1 – 3 |
| FC Vorwärts Frankfurt/Oder – FC Hansa Rostock | 1 – 5, 1 – 1 |
| FC Rot-Weiß Erfurt – 1. FC Lokomotive Leipzig | 1 – 1, 1 – 3 |
| Berliner FC Dynamo – BSG Sachsenring Zwickau | 2 – 3, 2 – 4 |
| FC Carl Zeiss Jena – 1. FC Union Berlin | 1 – 0, 1 – 1 |
| BSG Stahl Riesa – BSG Motor Nordhausen West | 1 – 0, 1 – 0 |
| ASG Vorwärts Stralsund – FC Karl-Marx-Stadt | walkover |

== Quarter finals ==
| SG Dynamo Dresden - BSG Stahl Riesa | 2 – 0, 2 – 1 |
| ASG Vorwärts Stralsund - BSG Sachsenring Zwickau | 1 – 1, 2 – 4 |
| FC Carl Zeiss Jena - 1. FC Lokomotive Leipzig | 3 – 1, 0 – 1 |
| BSG Wismut Aue - FC Hansa Rostock | 2 – 0, 2 – 1 |

== Semifinals ==
(15 and 22 March 1975)

| SG Dynamo Dresden - FC Carl Zeiss Jena | 3 – 1, 0 – 1 |
| BSG Sachsenring Zwickau - BSG Wismut Aue | 1 – 0, 1 – 2 |

== Final ==
=== Statistics ===
14 May 1975

| BSG Sachsenring Zwickau | 2 – 2 (a.e.t.) | Dynamo Dresden |
|---|---|---|
| Schykowski 73'; Nestler 119' | | Heidler 65'; Richter 110' |
Penalties
| Dietzsch (penalty scored); Blank (penalty missed); Bräutigam (penalty scored); H. Schykowski (penalty scored); Croy (penalty scored) | 4 – 3 | (penalty scored) Wätzlich; (penalty missed) Weber; (penalty scored) Geyer; (penalty missed) Dörner; (penalty scored) Kotte |

Stadion der Weltjugend, East Berlin
Attendance: 55,000
Referee: Heinz Einbeck (East Berlin)

ZWICKAU:
| GK | (East Germany) Jürgen Croy |
| DF | (East Germany) Hans Schykowski |
| DF | (East Germany) Roland Stemmler |
| DF | (East Germany) Peter Henschel | (substituted off) 74' |
| DF | (East Germany) Joachim Schykowski |
| MF | (East Germany) Dieter Leuschner | (substituted off) 11' |
| MF | (East Germany) Heinz Dietzsch |
| MF | (East Germany) Michael Braun |
| FW | (East Germany) Ludwig Blank |
| FW | (East Germany) Werner Bräutigam |
| FW | (East Germany) Peter Nestler |
Substitutes:
| MF | (East Germany) Andreas Reichelt | (substituted on) 11' |
| DF | (East Germany) Dieter Schubert | (substituted on) 74' |
Manager:
(East Germany) Karl-Heinz Kluge

DRESDEN:
| GK | (East Germany) Claus Boden |
| DF | (East Germany) Hans-Jürgen Dörner |
| DF | (East Germany) Gerd Weber |
| DF | (East Germany) Udo Schmuck |
| DF | (East Germany) Siegmar Wätzlich |
| MF | (East Germany) Reinhard Häfner |
| MF | (East Germany) Eduard Geyer |
| MF | (East Germany) Frank Ganzera |
| FW | (East Germany) Dieter Riedel |
| FW | (East Germany) Peter Kotte |
| FW | (East Germany) Gert Heidler | (substituted off) 80' |
Substitutes:
| DF | (East Germany) Frank Richter | (substituted on) 80' |
Manager:
(East Germany) Walter Fritzsch

=== Match review ===
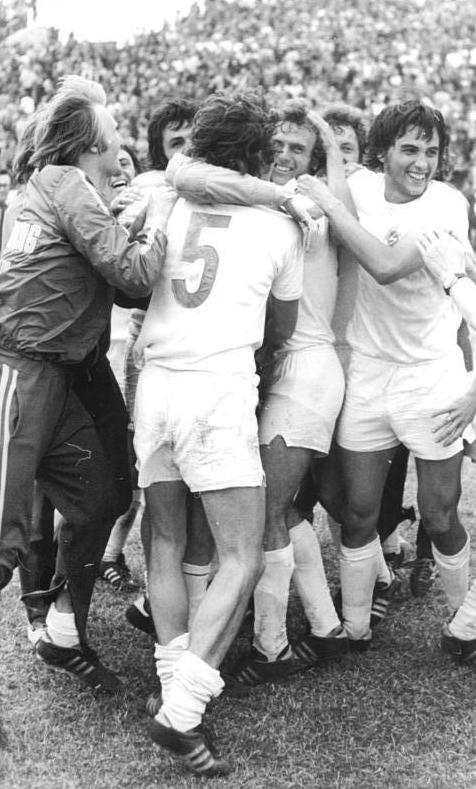
Zwickau's players celebrate their cup win

Dynamo Dresden were clear cut favorites in this Saxon derby. They had finished third in the league and had three East German internationals in their line-up: Dörner, Wätzlich and Häfner. Sachsenring Zwickau had finished 7th in the league and their only international player was goalkeeper Jürgen Croy. But in front of a crowd of 55,000 Dresden could not cope with their role as favorites from the beginning. Their famous midfield with Häfner, Geyer and Ganzera couldn't find their rhythm, instead Dynamo's play was dominated by nervousness. On the other hand, Zwickau failed to put their opponents under pressure, despite valiant efforts. Additionally, bad luck struck them when midfielder Leuschner had to be substituted due to injury in the 11th minute. When Heidler eventually put Dresden in the lead after 65 minutes, the match seemed to go in the expected direction, but Zwickau struck back. Eight minutes later, their goalscorer Schykowski equalised and the match went into extra time. Ten minutes before the end of extra time, Dresden again took the lead through a goal by Richter who had been subbed in after 80 minutes, but just before the final whistle Zwickau's left winger Nestler could equalise once more. Therefore, the final, for the first time in FDGB-Pokal history, had to be decided by penalty kicks. Here Zwickau's goalkeeper Croy became the hero of the day, first saving two penalty kicks and then converting the final kick for the 4–3 victory.
