= Ralf Schulenberg =

East German footballer

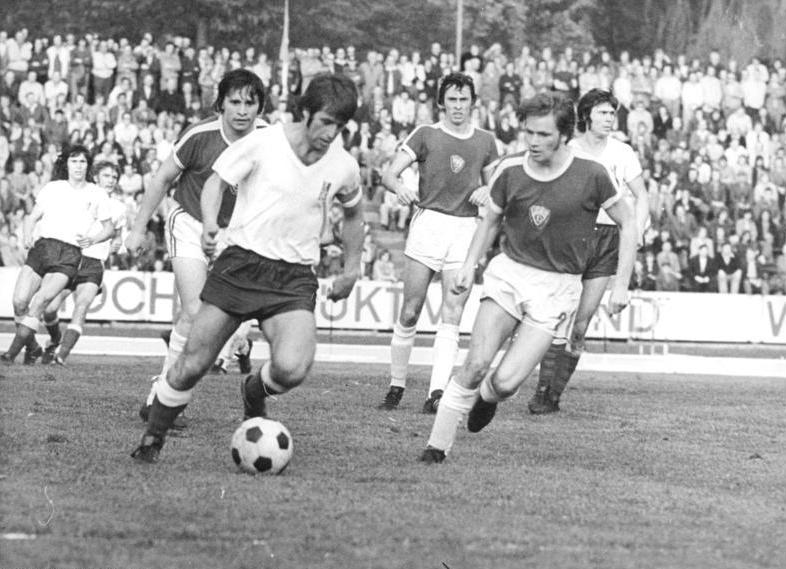
- left Ralf Schulenberg

Personal information
- Date of birth: 15 August 1949 (age 77)
- Place of birth: Erfurt, Soviet-occupied Germany
- Height: 1.71 m (5 ft 7 in)
- Position: Striker

Senior career*
Years	Team	Apps	(Gls)
1967–1968	FC Rot-Weiß Erfurt II	18	(2)
1968–1969	FC Rot-Weiß Erfurt	7	(0)
1969–1976	BFC Dynamo	124	(25)
1977–1983	BSG Motor Rudisleben		

International career
1972	East Germany	3	(0)
Medal record
Men's football
Representing East Germany
Olympic Games
Bronze medal – third place	1972 Munich	Team competition
- * Club domestic league appearances and goals

Ralf Schulenberg (born 15 August 1949) is a retired East German footballer.

== Club career ==
Schulenberg left FC Rot-Weiß Erfurt for BFC Dynamo for the 1968-69 season. The transfer of Schulenberg was probably a compensation for the transfer of the talented Günter Wolff, who had left BFC Dynamo for FC Rot-Weiß Erfurt after the 1967–68 season. Schulenberg was voted the 1975 BFC Footballer of the Year at the 10th edition of the club's traditional ball in the Dynamo-Sporthalle at the beginning of January 1976. Th striker scored 25 goals for BFC Dynamo in the East German top-flight during his career.

== International career ==
In 1972 the BFC Dynamo player was part of the East Germany national team. One of his three full international matches in the year took place as part of the 1972 Olympic football tournament where Schulenberg won the bronze medal with the East German Olympic team.
