= Wolf-Rüdiger Netz =

East German footballer

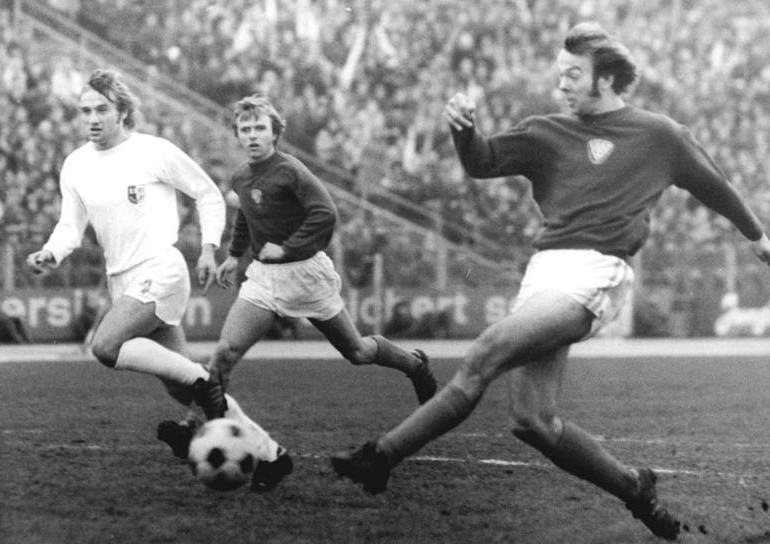
- Wolf-Rüdiger Netz (center) during a match between BFC Dynamo and 1. FC Magdeburg on 7 December 1975 in the FDGB-Pokal.

Personal information
- Date of birth: 15 December 1950 (age 75)
- Place of birth: Schwerin, East Germany
- Height: 1.72 m (5 ft 8 in)
- Position: Forward

Youth career
- 1958–1968: SG Dynamo Schwerin

Senior career*
Years	Team	Apps	(Gls)
1968–1971	SG Dynamo Schwerin	48	(15)
1971–1973	BFC Dynamo	40	(11)
1971–1973	BFC Dynamo II	9	(9)
1973–1974	SG Dynamo Schwerin	6	(2)
1974–1984	BFC Dynamo	225	(101)
1974–1975	BFC Dynamo II	4	(1)

International career
1972–1973	East Germany U18	3	(0)
1976-1977	East Germany B	2	(0)
1978–1981	East Germany	2	(0)
1979–1980	East Germany Olympic	11	(5)
Medal record
Men's Football
Representing East Germany
Olympic Games
Silver medal – second place	1980 Moscow	Team
- * Club domestic league appearances and goals

Wolf-Rüdiger Netz (born 15 December 1950 in Schwerin) is a former football player from East Germany.

Netz began playing football at SG Dynamo Schwerin when he was eight years old and made his professional debut with SG Dynamo Schwerin in the DDR-Liga in the 1968-69 season. Netz joined BFC Dynamo during the summer of 1971. He became five times East German champion in a row with BFC Dynamo.

Netz won the silver medal with the East German Olympic team at the 1980 Summer Olympics in Moscow. Together with his teammates, he was awarded the Patriotic Order of Merit in bronze the same year. The forward also won two caps for the East Germany national team.

Netz scored 112 goals in 265 league matches for the record champion BFC Dynamo. Nobody scored more goals for die Weinroten in the top division of East German football. Only Hans-Jürgen Riediger also managed to amass a three-digit number of goals for BFC Dynamo.
