= Tag24 =

Mass media outlet

TAG24 NEWS
- Type: Mass media
- Owner: MADSACK Media Group
- Headquarters: Dresden, Germany & New York City, United States
- Website: www.tag24.de

TAG24 NEWS is an online news outlet and mass media publisher that operates editorial offices and local channels in over 10 cities in Germany and the United States. It encompasses TAG24 NEWS Deutschland GmbH, which hosts TAG24.de and is based in Dresden, and TAG24 US at TAG24.com, with headquarters at One World Trade Center in New York City. TAG24.de is one of the top news websites in Germany by unique monthly visitors, and has a steady readership among English speakers at TAG24.com.

== Concept and Content ==
TAG24.de has 10 editorial pages by region: Berlin, Chemnitz, Dresden, Erfurt, Frankfurt am Main., Hamburg, Cologne, Leipzig, Magdeburg, Munich, Stuttgart, and Thuringia.

== History ==
TAG24 launched on October 3, 2014, under the name Mopo24. It was intended to be the website of the Morgenpost Sachsen (Morgenpost Dresden and Morgenpost Chemnitz) regional newspaper. However, after tensions with the Hamburger Morgenpost, an unaffiliated publication which already had an online presence under mopo.de, the name was changed to TAG24.de in order to avoid confusion. After the name change in October 2016, the website's reach developed beyond Saxony and new editorial offices were opened across Germany. In Germany, Google News Showcase has signed partnerships with TAG24 and Sächsische Zeitung.

== Shareholder structure ==
TAG24 NEWS Deutschland GmbH is a subsidiary of the Dresden-based DDV Media Group, which also publishes the Sächsische Zeitung and Morgenpost Sachsen newspapers, among others. Like the Morgenpost of Saxony, from which it emerged, TAG24 belongs to the tabloid press. It is majority owned by MADSACK Media Group.
