= Peter Kotte =

German footballer

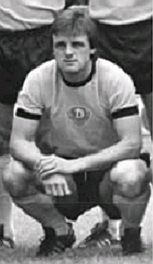

Personal information
- Date of birth: 8 December 1954 (age 71)
- Place of birth: Thiendorf, East Germany
- Position: Forward

Youth career
- –1969: BSG Lok Lampertswalde
- 1969–1972: Stahl Riesa

Senior career*
Years	Team	Apps	(Gls)
1972–1973	Stahl Riesa	21	(4)
1973–1981	Dynamo Dresden	156	(53)
1981–1984	Fortschritt Neustadt		

International career
1976–1980	East Germany	21	(3)
- * Club domestic league appearances and goals

Peter Kotte (born 8 December 1954) is a German former footballer.

He scored 54 goals in the Oberliga for Stahl Riesa and Dynamo Dresden in 166 matches.

Kotte won 21 caps for the East Germany national team from 1976 until 1980.
