= List of Soviet top tier clubs =

The following is a list of clubs (teams of masters) who have played in the Soviet top-tier from its formation in 1936 until its discontinuation in 1992. It includes Gruppa A, Pervaya Gruppa, Class A, and Soviet Higher League.

Over that span, 65 teams have played in the Soviet top tier. While the tier was dominated by Russian teams of masters, particularly out of Moscow, there many clubs from some dozen other union republics.

== Table ==
A 'spell' refers to a number of consecutive seasons within the league, uninterrupted by relegation. A 'total seasons absent' counts the number of seasons between spells; in parentheses is the number of seasons missed before the team's first appearance.

Team	Location	Republic	Total seasons	Total spells	Longest spell	Last promotion	Last relegation	Total seasons absent	Seasons	Highest finish
Admiralteyets	Leningrad	Russian Federation	3	2	2	1960	1961	32 (19)	1958; 1960–1961	10th
Ararat	Yerevan	Armenia	33	3	27	1966	1963	11 (10)	1949–1950; 1960–1963; 1966–1991	1st
Burevestnik	Moscow	Russian Federation	1	1	1	1938	1938	50 (3)	1938	26th (relegated)
Chernomorets	Odessa	Ukraine	22	3	14	1988	1986	4 (28)	1965–1970; 1974–1986; 1988–1991	3rd
CSKA	Moscow	Russian Federation	48	4	32	1990	1987	6	1936–1951; 1954–1984; 1987; 1990–1991	1st
Daugava	Riga	Latvia	7	2	4	1960	1962	37 (10)	1949–1952; 1960–1962	11th
Dinamo	Kiev	Ukraine	54	1	54	1936 (s)	Never relegated	0	1936–1991	1st
Dinamo	Kirovabad	Azerbaijan	1	1	1	1968	1968	24 (29)	1968	20th (relegated)
Dinamo	Leningrad	Russian Federation	17	2	15	1962	1963	37	1936–1953; 1962–1963	5th
Dinamo	Minsk	Belarus	39	7	14	1979	1976 (a)	9 (6)	1945–1950; 1952; 1954–1955; 1957; 1960–1973; 1976 (s-a); 1979–1991	1st
Dinamo	Moscow	Russian Federation	54	1	54	1936 (s)	Never relegated	0	1936–1991	1st
Dinamo	Odessa	Ukraine	2	1	2	1938	1939	49 (3)	1938–1939	10th
Dinamo	Rostov-na-Donu	Russian Federation	1	1	1	1938	1938	50 (3)	1938	18th (relegated)
Dinamo	Tbilisi	Georgia	51	1	51	1936 (a)	1989	2 (1)	1936 (a)–1989	1st
Dnepr	Dnepropetrovsk	Ukraine	19	2	11	1981	1978	2 (33)	1972–1978; 1981–1991	1st
Elektrik	Leningrad	Russian Federation	5	1	5	1936	1939	49	1936–1939	5th
Fakel	Voronezh	Russian Federation	2	1	1	1985	1985	30 (22)	1961; 1985	15th (relegated)
Guria	Lanchkhuti, Guria	Georgia	1	1	1	1987	1987	4 (49)	1987	16th (relegated)
Kairat	Alma-Ata	Kazakhstan	24	5	6	1984	1988	9 (21)	1960–1964; 1966–1969; 1971–1974; 1977–1982; 1984–1988	8th
Kalev	Tallinn	Estonia	2	1	2	1960	1961	31 (21)	1960–1961	19th
Karpaty	Lvov	Ukraine	9	2	8	1980	1980	13 (32)	1971–1977; 1980	4th
Krylia Sovetov	Moscow	Russian Federation	6	2	5	1940	1948	45 (3)	1938; 1940–1948	7th
Krylia Sovetov	Kuibyshev	Russian Federation	26	5	10	1979	1979	21 (7)	1946–1955; 1957–1960; 1962–1969; 1976–1977; 1979	4th
Kuban	Krasnodar	Russian Federation	3	1	3	1980	1982	9 (42)	1980–1982	13th
Lokomotiv	Kharkov	Ukraine	4	2	2	1953	1954	40 (10)	1949–1950; 1953–1954	9th
Lokomotiv	Kiev	Ukraine	1	1	1	1938	1938	50 (3)	1938	17th (relegated)
Lokomotiv	Moscow	Russian Federation	38	8	12	1991	1989	16	1936–1945; 1948–1950; 1952–1963; 1965–1969; 1972; 1975–1980; 1988–1989; 1991	2nd
Lokomotiv	Tbilisi	Georgia	1	1	1	1938	1938	50 (3)	1938	24th (relegated)
Metallist	Kharkov	Ukraine	14	2	10	1982	1963	19 (21)	1960–1963; 1982–1991	6th
Metallurg	Moscow	Russian Federation	4	1	4	1937	1940	48 (2)	1937–1940	3rd
Metallurg	Zaporozhye	Ukraine	1	1	1	1991	Never relegated	0 (53)	1991	13th
MVO	Kalinin	Russian Federation	1	1	1	1952	1952	40 (13)	1952	6th (withdrawn)
Neftchi	Baku	Azerbaijan	27	3	13	1977	1988	17 (10)	1949–1950; 1960–1972; 1977–1988	3rd
Nistru	Chișinău	Moldova	11	3	9	1983	1983	26 (17)	1956–1964; 1974; 1983	6th
ODO	Sverdlovsk	Russian Federation	1	1	1	1956	1956	36 (17)	1956	11th (relegated)
Pakhtakor	Tashkent	Uzbekistan	22	5	7	1991	1984	11 (21)	1960–1963; 1965–1971; 1973–1975; 1978–1984; 1991	6th
Pamir	Dushanbe	Tajikistan	3	1	3	1989	Never relegated	0 (51)	1989–1991	10th
Pischevik	Moscow	Russian Federation	1	1	1	1938	1938	50 (3)	1938	23th (relegated)
Rotor	Volgograd	Russian Federation	11	2	9	1989	1990	40 (3)	1938–1950; 1989–1990	4th
Selmash	Kharkov	Ukraine	1	1	1	1938	1938	50 (3)	1938	15th (relegated)
Shakhter	Donetsk	Ukraine	44	4	20	1973	1971	7 (3)	1938–1940; 1949–1952; 1955–1971; 1973–1991	2nd
Shinnik	Yaroslavl	Russian Federation	1	1	1	1964	1964	28 (25)	1964	16th (relegated)
SKA	Odessa	Ukraine	2	1	2	1965	1966	26 (26)	1965–1966	17th
SKA	Rostov-na-Donu	Russian Federation	21	4	15	1984	1985	13 (20)	1959–1973; 1975; 1979–1981; 1984–1985	2nd
Spartak	Kharkov	Ukraine	1	1	1	1938	1938	50 (3)	1938	21th (relegated)
Spartak	Leningrad	Russian Federation	1	1	1	1938	1938	50 (3)	1938	20th (relegated)
Spartak	Moscow	Russian Federation	53	2	39	1978	1976 (a)	1	1936–1976 (a); 1978–1991	1st
Spartak	Tbilisi	Georgia	2	1	2	1950	1951	41 (11)	1950–1951	9th
Spartak	Vladikavkaz	Russian Federation	2	1	1	1991	1970	21 (31)	1970; 1991	11th
Stalinets	Moscow	Russian Federation	1	1	1	1938	1938	50 (3)	1938	16th (relegated)
Tavriya	Simferopol	Ukraine	1	1	1	1981	1981	10 (43)	1981	17th (relegated)
Temp	Baku	Azerbaijan	1	1	1	1938	1938	50 (3)	1938	19th (relegated)
Torpedo	Gorkiy	Russian Federation	2	1	1	1954	1954	40 (12)	1951; 1954	13th (relegated)
Torpedo	Moscow	Russian Federation	51	1	51	1938	Never relegated	0 (3)	1938–1991	1st
Torpedo	Kutaisi	Georgia	13	3	9	1985	1986	17 (24)	1962–1970; 1982–1983; 1985–1986	11th
Trudovye Rezervy	Leningrad	Russian Federation	3	1	3	1954	1956	36 (15)	1954–1956	4th
Uralmash	Sverdlovsk	Russian Federation	1	1	1	1969	1969	23 (30)	1969	20th (relegated)
VMS	Moscow	Russian Federation	1	1	1	1951	1951	41 (12)	1951	13th (relegated)
Volga	Gorkiy	Russian Federation	1	1	1	1964	1964	28 (25)	1964	14th (relegated)
VVS	Moscow	Russian Federation	6	1	6	1947	1952	40 (8)	1947–1952	4th
Zaria	Voroshilovgrad	Ukraine	14	1	14	1967	1979	12 (28)	1967–1979	1st
Zenit	Leningrad	Russian Federation	49	1	49	1938	1989	2 (3)	1938–1989	1st
Zenit	Leningrad	Russian Federation	1	1	1	1938	1938	50 (3)	1938	22th (relegated)
Zhalgiris	Vilnius	Lithuania	11	3	7	1983	1989	29 (14)	1953; 1960–1962; 1983–1989	3rd

== The league participants and their season's rankings ==
The table does not include the unfinished 1941 season and the canceled 1992 season.

Seasons	36 (s)	36 (a)	37	38	39	40	45	46	47	48	49	50	51	52	53	54	55	56	57	58	59	60	61	62	63	64	65	66	67	68	69	70	71	72	73	74	75	76 (s)	76 (a)	77	78	79	80	81	82	83	84	85	86	87	88	89	90	91
Number of teams	7	8	9	26	14	13	12	12	13	14 (30)	18	19	15	14	11	13	12	12	12	12	12	22	22	22	20	17	17	19	19	20	20	17	16	16	16	16	16	16	16	16	16	18	18	18	18	18	18	18	16	16	16	16	13	16
Dinamo (Kiev)	2nd place, silver medalist(s)	6	3rd place, bronze medalist(s)	4	8	8	11	12	4	10	7	13	8	2nd place, silver medalist(s)	8	5	6	4	6	6	7	2nd place, silver medalist(s)	1st place, gold medalist(s)	5	9	6	2nd place, silver medalist(s)	1st place, gold medalist(s)	1st place, gold medalist(s)	1st place, gold medalist(s)	2nd place, silver medalist(s)	7	1st place, gold medalist(s)	2nd place, silver medalist(s)	2nd place, silver medalist(s)	1st place, gold medalist(s)	1st place, gold medalist(s)	8	2nd place, silver medalist(s)	1st place, gold medalist(s)	2nd place, silver medalist(s)	3rd place, bronze medalist(s)	1st place, gold medalist(s)	1st place, gold medalist(s)	2nd place, silver medalist(s)	7	10	1st place, gold medalist(s)	1st place, gold medalist(s)	6	2nd place, silver medalist(s)	3rd place, bronze medalist(s)	1st place, gold medalist(s)	5
Spartak (Moscow)	3rd place, bronze medalist(s)	1st place, gold medalist(s)	2nd place, silver medalist(s)	1st place, gold medalist(s)	1st place, gold medalist(s)	3rd place, bronze medalist(s)	10	6	8	3rd place, bronze medalist(s)	3rd place, bronze medalist(s)	5	6	1st place, gold medalist(s)	1st place, gold medalist(s)	2nd place, silver medalist(s)	2nd place, silver medalist(s)	1st place, gold medalist(s)	3rd place, bronze medalist(s)	1st place, gold medalist(s)	6	7	3rd place, bronze medalist(s)	1st place, gold medalist(s)	2nd place, silver medalist(s)	8	8	4	7	2nd place, silver medalist(s)	1st place, gold medalist(s)	3rd place, bronze medalist(s)	6	11	4	2nd place, silver medalist(s)	10	14	15		5	1st place, gold medalist(s)	2nd place, silver medalist(s)	2nd place, silver medalist(s)	3rd place, bronze medalist(s)	2nd place, silver medalist(s)	2nd place, silver medalist(s)	2nd place, silver medalist(s)	3rd place, bronze medalist(s)	1st place, gold medalist(s)	4	1st place, gold medalist(s)	5	2nd place, silver medalist(s)
Dinamo (Moscow)	1st place, gold medalist(s)	2nd place, silver medalist(s)	1st place, gold medalist(s)	5	7	1st place, gold medalist(s)	1st place, gold medalist(s)	2nd place, silver medalist(s)	2nd place, silver medalist(s)	2nd place, silver medalist(s)	1st place, gold medalist(s)	2nd place, silver medalist(s)	5	3rd place, bronze medalist(s)	4	1st place, gold medalist(s)	1st place, gold medalist(s)	2nd place, silver medalist(s)	1st place, gold medalist(s)	2nd place, silver medalist(s)	1st place, gold medalist(s)	3rd place, bronze medalist(s)	11	2nd place, silver medalist(s)	1st place, gold medalist(s)	7	5	8	2nd place, silver medalist(s)	5	4	2nd place, silver medalist(s)	5	10	3rd place, bronze medalist(s)	6	3rd place, bronze medalist(s)	1st place, gold medalist(s)	6	4	4	5	14	4	11	15	16	14	2nd place, silver medalist(s)	10	10	8	3rd place, bronze medalist(s)	6
CSKA (Moscow)	4	8	9	2nd place, silver medalist(s)	3rd place, bronze medalist(s)	4	2nd place, silver medalist(s)	1st place, gold medalist(s)	1st place, gold medalist(s)	1st place, gold medalist(s)	2nd place, silver medalist(s)	1st place, gold medalist(s)	1st place, gold medalist(s)	w/d		6	3rd place, bronze medalist(s)	3rd place, bronze medalist(s)	5	3rd place, bronze medalist(s)	9	6	4	4	7	3rd place, bronze medalist(s)	3rd place, bronze medalist(s)	5	9	4	6	1st place, gold medalist(s)	12	5	10	13	13	7	7	14	6	8	5	6	15	12	18			15			2nd place, silver medalist(s)	1st place, gold medalist(s)
Torpedo (Moscow)				9	9	11	3rd place, bronze medalist(s)	4	5	5	4	10	12	10	3rd place, bronze medalist(s)	9	4	5	2nd place, silver medalist(s)	7	5	1st place, gold medalist(s)	2nd place, silver medalist(s)	7	10	2nd place, silver medalist(s)	1st place, gold medalist(s)	6	12	3rd place, bronze medalist(s)	5	6	7	9	13	4	4	12	1st place, gold medalist(s)	3rd place, bronze medalist(s)	8	16	11	5	8	6	6	5	9	4	3rd place, bronze medalist(s)	5	4	3rd place, bronze medalist(s)
Dinamo (Tbilisi)		3rd place, bronze medalist(s)	4	6	2nd place, silver medalist(s)	2nd place, silver medalist(s)	4	3rd place, bronze medalist(s)	3rd place, bronze medalist(s)	4	6	3rd place, bronze medalist(s)	2nd place, silver medalist(s)	4	2nd place, silver medalist(s)	8	9	8	7	9	3rd place, bronze medalist(s)	8	7	3rd place, bronze medalist(s)	5	1st place, gold medalist(s)	6	7	3rd place, bronze medalist(s)	7	3rd place, bronze medalist(s)	4	3rd place, bronze medalist(s)	3rd place, bronze medalist(s)	5	9	8	3rd place, bronze medalist(s)	3rd place, bronze medalist(s)	2nd place, silver medalist(s)	1st place, gold medalist(s)	4	4	3rd place, bronze medalist(s)	4	16	7	8	5	13	14	11	w/d	
Dnepr (Dnepropetrovsk)																																		6	8	10	7	11	13	12	16			8	9	1st place, gold medalist(s)	3rd place, bronze medalist(s)	3rd place, bronze medalist(s)	11	2nd place, silver medalist(s)	1st place, gold medalist(s)	2nd place, silver medalist(s)	6	9
Ararat (Yerevan)										w/d	16	14										9	8	18	18			13	8	16	15	12	2nd place, silver medalist(s)	4	1st place, gold medalist(s)	5	5	2nd place, silver medalist(s)	14	11	14	7	8	14	5	14	11	13	14	8	9	12	7	7
Dinamo (Minsk)							9	11	12	12	15	17		14		3rd place, bronze medalist(s)	12		12			11	19	19	3rd place, bronze medalist(s)	9	4	11	4	6	13	9	11	8	15			9	16			6	10	9	1st place, gold medalist(s)	3rd place, bronze medalist(s)	5	4	10	5	12	9	12	8
Zenit (Leningrad)				14	11	10	6	9	6	13	5	6	7	7	5	7	8	9	10	4	8	15	13	11	6	11	9	16	19	11	9	14	13	7	11	7	14	13	5	10	10	10	3rd place, bronze medalist(s)	15	7	4	1st place, gold medalist(s)	6	4	14	6	16		
Zaria (Voroshilovgrad)																													16	13	11	5	4	1st place, gold medalist(s)	7	14	9	16	12	9	9	17												
Shakhter (Donetsk)				11	12	12				w/d	18	11	3rd place, bronze medalist(s)	13			7	7	8	8	12	17	12	8	11	5	12	10	6	14	10	10	16		6	12	2nd place, silver medalist(s)	5	10	5	3rd place, bronze medalist(s)	2nd place, silver medalist(s)	6	7	14	9	13	12	6	7	8	14	8	12
SKA (Rostov/Donu)																					4	4	9	9	4	4	7	2nd place, silver medalist(s)	10	12	12	8	14	12	16		16					15	9	16			14	18						
Lokomotiv (Moscow)	5	4	6	8	5	6	12			7	11	15		9	6	10	5	10	4	5	2nd place, silver medalist(s)	5	5	13	17		15	17	17	10	18			15			11	15	8	6	15	12	18								7	15		16
Chernomorets (Odessa)				10	14																						14	14	18	8	8	15				3rd place, bronze medalist(s)	12	10	9	7	7	11	7	11	10	8	4	15	15		13	6	9	4
Zhalgiris (Vilnius)										w/d					11							20	20	22																						5	9	7	8	3rd place, bronze medalist(s)	5	4	w/d	
Metallurg (Moscow)			5	3rd place, bronze medalist(s)	6	13																																																
Neftchi (Baku)											14	19										21	18	10	8	12	11	3rd place, bronze medalist(s)	5	9	7	11	8	16						13	13	14	13	10	16	13	15	16	13	9	15			
Karpaty (Lvov)																																	10	14	14	11	6	4	4	15			17											
Krylia Sovetov (Kuibyshev)								10	7	11	10	7	4	8	7	11	11		11	10	11	16		17	15	10	13	18	11	18	19							6	11	16		18												
Rotor (Volgograd)				12	4	7	7	8	9	8	13	18																																								10	13	
VVS (Moscow)									13	9	8	4	10	11																																								
Trudovye Rezervy (Leningrad)																4	10	12																																				
Dinamo (Leningrad)	6	7	7	7	10	5	5	5	10	6	9	8	9	5	10									16	16																													
Elektrik (Leningrad)	7	5	8	13	13																																																	
MVO (Kalinin)														6	w/d																																							
Pakhtakor (Tashkent)																						14	10	6	20		10	9	15	17	16	13	15		12	8	15				11	9	16	18	6	10	17							14
Nistru (Chișinău)										w/d								6	9	11	10	22	16	12	13	17										16										18								
Metallist (Kharkov)																						13	6	14	19																				12	11	12	10	12	11	11	7	11	15
Kairat (Alma-Ata)																						18	17	20	14	15		12	14	15	17		8	13	9	15				8	12	13	12	12	18		8	9	7	12	16			
Krylia Sovetov (Moscow)				25		9	8	7	11	14																																												
Lokomotiv (Kharkov)										w/d	12	16			9	12																																						
Spartak (Tbilisi)												9	14																																									
Pamir (Dushanbe)																																																				13	10	10
Admiralteyets (Leningrad)																				12		10	14																															
ODO (Sverdlovsk)																		11																																				
Daugava (Riga)											17	12	11	12								12	21	21																														
Torpedo (Kutaisi)																								15	12	13	16	15	13	19	14	16													13	17		11	16					
Spartak (Vladikavkaz)																																17																						11
VMS (Moscow)													13																																									
Metallurg (Zaporozhye)																																																						13
Torpedo (Gorkiy)										w/d			15			13																																						
Kuban (Krasnodar)																																											15	13	17									
Volga (Gorkiy)																										14																												
Selmash (Kharkov)				15																																																		
Fakel (Voronezh)																							15																									17						
Stalinets (Moscow)				16																																																		
Shinnik (Yaroslavl)																										16																												
Guria (Lanchkhuti)																																																		16			w/d	
Lokomotiv (Kiev)				17																																																		
SKA (Odessa)																											17	19																										
Tavriya (Simferopol)																																												17										
Dinamo (Rostov/Donu)				18																																																		
Temp (Baku)				19																																																		
Kalev (Tallin)										w/d												19	22																															
Spartak (Leningrad)				20																																																		
Dinamo (Kirovabad)																														20																								
Uralmash (Sverdlovsk)										w/d																					20																							
Spartak (Kharkov)				21																																																		
Zenit Leningrad				22																																																		
Pischevik (Moscow)				23																																																		
Lokomotiv (Tbilisi)				24		w/d																																																
Burevestnik (Moscow)				26																																																		

For the 1948 season originally, there were supposed to take part 30 teams, but in less than 2 weeks into the season, it was scratched, and the competition was completely reorganized. For that reason, certain teams are marked with "w/d" (withdrawn).

Dynamo Moscow and Dynamo Kyiv were the only teams who participated in every season of Soviet top-tier competitions. Torpedo Moscow missed only the first 3 pre-war seasons and has not been relegated since. In 1991, two debutants (Metallurg Z. and Pamir) entered the competition, which was their only appearance for the competition after which it collapsed, thus, those 2 never technically been relegated.

In 1940, Locomotive Tbilisi were withdrawn from competitions due to their poor performance, and all their results were scratched.

In 1952, CDSA Moscow was banned from competitions due to the Soviet Union national football team's poor performance at the 1952 Summer Olympics.

In 1953, due to the death of Joseph Stalin, all military-related teams were banned (withdrawn) from the competition. They were reinstated for the next season.

In 1990, the Soviet Higher League did not account for 3 of its teams when teams from Georgia and later Lithuania withdrew from the competitions due to the political crisis, which eventually led to the dissolution of the Soviet Union.

== All clubs per republic and city ==
Republic	City	Clubs
Russian SFSR	Moscow	Spartak, Dinamo, CSKA, Torpedo, Lokomotiv, Metallurg, VVS, MVO, VMS, Krylia Sovetov, Stalinets, Pischevik, Burevestnik
Russian SFSR	Leningrad	Zenit, Trudovye Rezervy, Dinamo, Elektrik, Admiralteyets, Zenit (older), Spartak
Russian SFSR	Rostov-na-Donu	SKA, Dinamo
Russian SFSR	Kuibyshev	Krylia Sovetov
Russian SFSR	Volgograd	Rotor
Russian SFSR	Sverdlovsk	ODO, Uralmash
Russian SFSR	Vladikavkaz	Spartak
Russian SFSR	Krasnodar	Kuban
Russian SFSR	Gorkiy	Torpedo, Volga
Russian SFSR	Voronezh	Fakel
Russian SFSR	Yaroslavl	Shinnik
Ukrainian SSR	Kiev	Dinamo, Lokomotiv
Ukrainian SSR	Dnepropetrovsk	Dnepr
Ukrainian SSR	Voroshilovgrad	Zaria
Ukrainian SSR	Donetsk	Shakhter
Ukrainian SSR	Odessa	Chernomorets, SKA, Dinamo
Ukrainian SSR	Lvov	Karpaty
Ukrainian SSR	Kharkov	Metallist, Lokomotiv, Selmash, Spartak
Ukrainian SSR	Zaporozhye	Metallurg
Ukrainian SSR	Simferopol	Tavriya
Georgian SSR	Tbilisi	Dinamo, Spartak, Lokomotiv
Georgian SSR	Kutaisi	Torpedo
Georgian SSR	Lanchkhuti	Guria
Azerbaijan SSR	Baku	Neftchi, Temp
Azerbaijan SSR	Kirovabad	Dinamo
Armenian SSR	Yerevan	Ararat
Byelorussian SSR	Minsk	Dinamo
Lithuanian SSR	Vilnius	Zhalgiris
Kazakh SSR	Alma-Ata	Kairat
Uzbek SSR	Tashkent	Pakhtakor
Moldavian SSR	Chișinău	Nistru
Latvian SSR	Riga	Daugava
Tajik SSR	Dushanbe	Pamir
Estonian SSR	Tallin	Kalev

The republics that were never represented at the top level were the Turkmen SSR, the Kyrgyz SSR, and the Karelo-Finnish SSR.
