= 1939 Soviet First League =

Soviet First League
- Season: 1939
- Champions: Krylya Sovetov Moscow
- Promoted: Krylya Sovetov Moscow; Lokomotiv Tbilisi
- Relegated: 11 teams

The 1939 Gruppa B was fourth season of the Soviet (second tier) professional football competitions. The second tier competitions were revived after last year merger.

== Teams ==
=== Relegated ===
There were 12 teams relegated from the 1938 Gruppa A.

- Burevestnik Moscow – 26th place (debut)
- Krylya Sovetov Moscow – 25th place (debut)
- Lokomotiv Kiev – 17th place (debut)
- Lokomotiv Tbilisi – 24th place (debut)
- Pischevik Moscow – 23rd place (debut)
- Spartak Kharkov – 21st place (debut)
- Zenit Leningrad – 22nd place (debut)
- Selmash Kharkov – 15th place (returning after two seasons, previously as Serp i Molot Kharkov)
- Dinamo Rostov-na-Donu – 18th place (returning after a season)
- FC Temp Baku – 19th place (returning after a season)
- Spartak Leningrad – 20th place (returning after a season)
- Stalinets Moscow – 16th place (returning after a season)

=== Promoted ===
- Dinamo Batumi – Champion of the Georgian SSR (debut)
- Dzerzhinets Voroshilovgrad – Champion at Football Championship of the Ukrainian SSR (debut)
- Spartak Yerevan – Champion of the Armenian SSR (debut)
- Spartak Minsk – 3rd place at Football Championship of the Belarusian SSR (debut)
- Dinamo Kazan – (returning after a season)
- Dinamo Kharkov – (debut, previously withdrew before the 1936 spring competition)
- Avangard Leningrad – (debut)
- Osnova Ivanovo – (debut)
- Stal Dnepropetrovsk – (debut)
- Sudostroitel Nikolayev – (debut)
- Torpedo Gorkiy – (debut)

== League standings ==
| Pos | Republic | Team | Pld | W | D | L | GF | GA | GD | Pts |
|---|---|---|---|---|---|---|---|---|---|---|
| 1 | Russian SFSR | Krylya Sovetov Moscow (P) | 22 | 17 | 2 | 3 | 52 | 19 | +33 | 36 |
| 2 | Georgian SSR | Lokomotiv Tbilisi (P) | 22 | 13 | 7 | 2 | 44 | 23 | +21 | 33 |
| 3 | Russian SFSR | Dinamo Rostov-na-Donu (R) | 22 | 11 | 7 | 4 | 43 | 28 | +15 | 29 |
| 4 | Russian SFSR | Pischevik Moscow | 22 | 12 | 4 | 6 | 53 | 29 | +24 | 28 |
| 5 | Azerbaijan SSR | Temp Baku | 22 | 12 | 4 | 6 | 29 | 19 | +10 | 28 |
| 6 | Russian SFSR | Spartak Leningrad | 22 | 11 | 5 | 6 | 46 | 27 | +19 | 27 |
| 7 | Ukrainian SSR | Dinamo Kharkov | 22 | 10 | 7 | 5 | 43 | 31 | +12 | 27 |
| 8 | Russian SFSR | Burevestnik Moscow | 22 | 10 | 6 | 6 | 38 | 28 | +10 | 26 |
| 9 | Ukrainian SSR | FC Sudostroitel Nikolayev | 22 | 9 | 7 | 6 | 40 | 38 | +2 | 25 |
| 10 | Ukrainian SSR | Selmash Kharkov | 22 | 10 | 4 | 8 | 38 | 25 | +13 | 24 |
| 11 | Ukrainian SSR | Lokomotiv Kiev | 22 | 11 | 2 | 9 | 40 | 33 | +7 | 24 |
| 12 | Russian SFSR | Torpedo Gorkiy | 22 | 9 | 6 | 7 | 37 | 38 | −1 | 24 |
| 13 | Georgian SSR | Dinamo Batumi (R) | 22 | 8 | 7 | 7 | 37 | 32 | +5 | 23 |
| 14 | Armenian SSR | Spartak Yerevan | 22 | 9 | 3 | 10 | 26 | 33 | −7 | 21 |
| 15 | Ukrainian SSR | Stal Dnepropetrovsk (R) | 22 | 6 | 7 | 9 | 27 | 37 | −10 | 19 |
| 16 | Ukrainian SSR | Dzerzhinets Voroshilovgrad (R) | 22 | 8 | 3 | 11 | 37 | 51 | −14 | 19 |
| 17 | Russian SFSR | Stalinets Moscow (R) | 22 | 6 | 6 | 10 | 32 | 42 | −10 | 18 |
| 18 | Ukrainian SSR | Spartak Kharkov (R) | 22 | 8 | 1 | 13 | 35 | 45 | −10 | 17 |
| 19 | Russian SFSR | Osnova Ivanovo (R) | 22 | 6 | 2 | 14 | 34 | 45 | −11 | 14 |
| 20 | Russian SFSR | Avangard Leningrad | 22 | 5 | 4 | 13 | 26 | 44 | −18 | 14 |
| 21 | Byelorussian SSR | Spartak Minsk (R) | 22 | 4 | 3 | 15 | 28 | 70 | −42 | 11 |
| 22 | Russian SFSR | Zenit Leningrad (Note: FC Zenit Leningrad was merged with FC Stalinets Leningrad into FC Zenit Leningrad playing in the Gruppa A (Soviet Top League).) | 22 | 3 | 4 | 15 | 28 | 46 | −18 | 10 |
| 23 | Russian SFSR | Dinamo Kazan (R) | 22 | 4 | 1 | 17 | 20 | 50 | −30 | 9 |

(P) Promoted; (R) Relegated

== Top scorers ==
| Rank | Scorer | Team | Goals (Pen.) |
|---|---|---|---|
| 1 | Nikolai Korzunov | Dinamo Rostov-na-Donu | 19 |
| 2 | Aleksei Kasimov | Pischevik Moscow | 16 |
| 3 | Viktor Osminkin | Krylya Sovetov Moscow | 14 |
| 4 | Vasiliy Makarov | Dinamo Kharkov | 13 |
| 5 | Aleksandr Andrenko | Selmash Kharkov | 11 |
| 5 | Yevgeniy Shelagin | Spartak Leningrad | 11 |
| 5 | Matvei Yenushkov | Krylya Sovetov Moscow | 11 |
| 5 | Pyotr Yurchenko | Dzerzhinets Voroshilovgrad | 11 |

== Number of teams by republics ==
| Number | Union republics | Team(s) |
|---|---|---|
| 11 | Russian SFSR | FC Krylia Sovetov Moscow, FC Pischevik Moscow, FC Spartak Leningrad, FC Burevestnik Moscow, FC Stalinets Moscow, FC Avangard Leningrad, FC Zenit Leningrad FC Dinamo Rostov-na-Donu, FC Torpedo Gorky, FC Osnova Ivanovo, FC Dinamo Kazan |
| 7 | Ukrainian SSR | FC Dinamo Kharkov, FC Sudostroitel Nikolaev, FC Selmash Kharkov, FC Lokomotiv Kiev, FC Stal Dnepropetrovsk, FC Dzerzhinets Voroshilovgrad, FC Spartak Kharkov |
| 2 | Georgian SSR | FC Lokomotiv Tbilisi, FC Dinamo Batumi |
| 1 | Azerbaijan SSR | FC Temp Baku |
| 1 | Armenian SSR | FC Spartak Yerevan |
| 1 | Belarusian SSR | FC Spartak Minsk |

== See also ==
- 1939 Soviet Top League
