= 1940 Soviet First League =

Soviet First League
- Season: 1940
- Champions: Krasnaya Zaria Leningrad
- Promoted: Krasnaya Zaria Leningrad (merger); Spartak Leningrad; Pischevik Odessa; Dinamo Minsk

The 1940 Soviet football championship in Gruppa B (Russian: Чемпионат СССР по футболу в группе «Б») was fifth season of the (second tier) professional football competitions in the Soviet Union. It was also the second season after revival of the second tier competitions and the last season before the Nazi Germany invaded the Soviet Union with the ongoing World War II.

The season started on 2 May 1940 (following the International Workers' Day) with matches in Ukraine and the Caucasus republics. The season ended on 27 October 1940 in Kiev.

== Teams ==
The league was reduced almost in half from 23 to 14 teams. The competitions were conducted in double round robin format where each team is playing with every other twice, at home and away.

=== Relegated ===
Two teams were relegated from the 1939 Gruppa A

- FC Krasnaya Zaria Leningrad – 13th place (debut)
- FC Dinamo Odessa – 14th place (debut, merged with Pischevik)
  - Former Dinamo Odessa players continued to play under Pischevik's colors.

=== Promoted ===
- FC Dinamo Minsk – Champion of the Belorussian SSR (debut)
- FC Pischevik Odessa – Runner-up of the Ukrainian SSR (debut)

=== Renamed ===
- FC Krasnaya Zaria Leningrad was previously known as FC Elektrik Leningrad
- FC Stroitel Baku was previously known as FC Temp Baku

== League Standings ==
Pos	Republic	Team	Pld	W	D	L	GF	GA	GD	Pts
1	Russian SFSR	Krasnaya Zaria Leningrad (Note: Krasnaya Zaria Leningrad and Avangard Leningrad were merged with Zenit Leningrad (Gruppa A) for the next season.) (C, P)	26	15	5	6	54	36	+18	35
2	Russian SFSR	Spartak Leningrad (P)	26	13	8	5	46	29	+17	34
3	Azerbaijan SSR	Stroitel Baku	26	12	7	7	39	29	+10	31
4	Ukrainian SSR	Dinamo Kharkov	26	12	5	9	44	37	+7	29
5	Ukrainian SSR	Pischevik Odessa (P)	26	12	4	10	49	40	+9	28
6	Byelorussian SSR	Dinamo Minsk (P)	26	10	6	10	42	41	+1	26
7	Ukrainian SSR	Lokomotiv Kiev	26	11	4	11	33	34	−1	26
8	Ukrainian SSR	Sudostroitel Nikolayev	26	9	8	9	25	31	−6	26
9	Russian SFSR	Torpedo Gorkiy	26	8	9	9	44	47	−3	25
10	Russian SFSR	Burevestnik Moscow	26	10	5	11	28	31	−3	25
11	Russian SFSR	Avangard Leningrad	26	12	1	13	40	51	−11	25
12	Russian SFSR	Pischevik Moscow	26	7	6	13	31	40	−9	20
13	Ukrainian SSR	Selmash Kharkov	26	6	5	15	41	53	−12	17
14	Armenian SSR	Spartak Yerevan	26	4	9	13	25	42	−17	17

(C) Champions; (P) Promoted

== Top scorers ==
Rank	Scorer	Team	Goals (Pen.)
1	Ivan Borisevich	Pischevik Odessa	15
2	Boris Chuchelov	Krasnaya Zaria Leningrad	14
2	Aleksandr Korotkov	Torpedo Gorkiy	14
4	Vasiliy Gusarov	Dinamo Kharkov	13
4	Leonid Oryekhov	Pischevik Odessa	13
6	Pavel Bogatyryov	Spartak Leningrad	11
6	Vasiliy Panfilov	Dinamo Minsk	11
6	Aram Stepanov	Stroitel Baku	11
9	Artur Chalikyan	Spartak Yerevan	10
9	Sergei Chernykh	Spartak Leningrad	10
9	Aleksei Salakov	Torpedo Gorkiy	10
9	Aleksandr Sevidov	Pischevik Moscow	10
9	Ivan Talanov	Avangard Leningrad	10
9	Pavel Vinkovatov	Selmash Kharkov	10

== Number of teams by republics ==
Number	Union republics	Team(s)
6	Russian SFSR	FC Krasnaya Zaria Leningrad, FC Spartak Leningrad, FC Burevestnik Moscow, FC Avangard Leningrad, FC Pischevik Moscow FC Torpedo Gorky
5	Ukrainian SSR	FC Dinamo Kharkov, FC Pischevik Odessa, FC Lokomotiv Kiev, FC Sudostroitel Nikolaev, FC Selmash Kharkov
1	Azerbaijan SSR	Stroitel Baku
1	Belarusian SSR	FC Dinamo Minsk
1	Armenian SSR	FC Spartak Yerevan

== See also ==
- Soviet First League
