= 1936 Soviet Cup =

1936 USSR Football Cup
Кубок СССР по футболу

Tournament details
- Country: Soviet Union
- Dates: July 18 – August 28
- Teams: 94

Final positions
- Champions: Lokomotiv Moscow (1st title)
- Runners-up: Dinamo Tbilisi
- Semifinalists: Krasnaya Zarya Leningrad; Krasnoye Znamya Noginsk

Tournament statistics
- Top goal scorer: Viktor Lavrov (Lokomotiv Moscow) – 6 goals

The 1936 Soviet Cup was the inaugural (first) season of the Soviet Union football cup competition.

The first message about a new tournament, which was unknown in the Soviet Union at that time, came in mid-March 1936. Answering a question from a Krasnyi Sport newspaper correspondent, the All-Union Council of Physical Culture chairman Vasiliy Mantsev said: "During the break between the championship halves (spring and autumn), the USSR Cup will be played with the participation of 40 teams playing according to the Olympic system (elimination tournament)."

The starter fired on July 18, 1936. About two dozen matches took place that day. Due to the paucity of information, it is impossible to identify who scored the first Soviet cup goal.

Lokomotiv Moscow became the first winner of the competition, beating Dinamo Tbilisi 2–0 in the final at Dynamo in Moscow, through early goals from Aleksei Sokolov and Viktor Lavrov.

== Competition background ==
On May 11, on the first page of "Krasnyi Sport" a medium-sized article appeared under a large heading: "FOR THE USSR CUP." It spoke in detail about... the upcoming championship. In the final lines, the newspaper reported that "the composition of the autumn championship of the Soviet Union will be determined depending on the results of the spring championship and the USSR Football Cup." Only a week later, the main sports body, realizing what was happening, separated the Cup from the championship. However, unrest among colleagues continued. On May 22, on the eve of the opening of the first union championship, one Leningrad newspaper stated: "Football games for the national championship will be held according to the Olympic system. The losing team is eliminated. All teams are divided into three groups - "A", "B" and "C".

Leading football specialist Mikhail Romm had to carry out explanatory work among the population those who were writing and reading. On June 1, on the pages of "Krasnyi Sport", he conducted a lesson on educational training and figuratively, in an accessible form, explained to the listeners that "championship in the "everyone with everyone" system (round-robin) is like a 5,000 meters race. It requires a "full lungs breathing", the ability to a stubborn and long-term tension, taking into account all chances. It allows even losses and draws but presupposes a high moral and sports form of the team throughout the long battle path." Romm compared the competitions of the Olympic system (elimination) to the 100 meters race, where "you can't stall at the start line, that is, one or two meters in the middle of the distance. There are no draws here. Here there is either a defeat that knocks the team out of action, or a victory that allows you to advance one step towards the finish line." In the Olympic system, a team's ability to make a short, concentrated effort is revealed... The "everyone against everyone" (round-robin) competition reveals the truly strongest team. In the "Olympic" (elimination) sometimes the weaker team wins but is able to compensate for the lack of class with temperament, tenacity, and the will to win over the course of several meetings."

=== Regulation ===
The regulations developed were strict and grueling. In the event of a draw, half an hour was added to regular time: two halves of 15 minutes each. If there was no winner, another 15 minute was added until the first goal. Well, if the balls flew past the goal post, a replay was scheduled. And so on until one would turn blue in the face.

== Participating teams ==
For a long time, the authorities could not decide on the number of participants. In March, they were talking about forty teams: to the two dozen teams of masters they were going to add about the same number from the outside. Later the conditions were specified and announced in mid-May: "128 teams will fight for the Soviet Cup: 23 of them are participants in the Soviet football championship calendar (Soviet League competitions) and no more than 105 other teams from among those who have declared their desire join the Cup draw." The exact numbers of those who applied and played have never been established. During the tournament, right up to the final, they varied from 84 to 97... 93 teams promised to play, but 82 kept their word.

Enter in Second Round	Enter in First Round	
28 teams of masters and 6 other teams	60 other teams	
✓ Dinamo Moscow; ✓ Dinamo Kiev; ✓ Spartak Moscow; ✓ CDKA Moscow; ✓ Lokomotiv Moscow; ✓ Dinamo Leningrad; ✓ Krasnaya Zaria Leningrad ✓ Dinamo Tbilisi; ✓ Zavod imeni Stalina Moscow; ✓ Stalinets Leningrad; ✓ Stalinets Moscow; ✓ Serp i Molot Moscow; ✓ Spartak Leningrad; ✓ Dinamo Dnepropetrovsk; ✓ Dinamo Kharkov ✓ Dinamo Rostov-na-Donu; ✓ Stroiteli Baku; ✓ Dinamo Odessa; ✓ Dinamo Kazan; ✓ Lokomotiv Tbilisi; ✓ Spartak Kharkov; ✓ Ugolschiki Stalino; ✓ Lokomotiv Kiev ✓ Trakotrny Zavod Kharkov; ✓ Krylia Sovetov Moscow; ✓ Dinamo Piatigorsk; ✓ Stal Dnepropetrovsk; ✓ Avtozavod imeni Molotova Gorkiy ✓ Dinamo Baku; ✓ Dinamo Gorkiy; ✓ Stakhanovets Kadiyevka; ✓ Vympel Kiev; ✓ KinAp Odessa; ✓ Kolkhoz imeni Chapayeva Kiev Oblast	✓ Dinamo Aktyubinsk; ✓ MedKombinat Alaverdi; ✓ Farvorovyi Zavod Baranovka; ✓ Dinamo Batumi; ✓ Dzerzhinets Bezhitsa; ✓ Dinamo-Trudkommuna Bolshevo; ✓ Dinamo Chelyabinsk; ✓ Zavod imeni Dzerzhinskogo Dneprodzerzhinsk; ✓ Lokomotiv Dnepropetrovsk; ✓ Zavod imeni Petrovskogo Dnepropetrovsk ✓ Spartak Ivanovo; ✓ Zenit Izhevsk; ✓ Spartak Kalinin; ✓ Arsenal Kiev; ✓ Bolshevik Kiev; ✓ Spartak Kiev; ✓ ElektroMash Zavod Kharkov; ✓ KhPZ Kharkov; ✓ Lokomotiv Kharkov; ✓ Serp i Molot Kharkov ✓ Dzerzhinets Kolomna; ✓ Stal (Zavod imeni Frunze) Konstantinovka; ✓ Dinamo Krasnodar; ✓ Dinamo Krivoi Rog; ✓ Gornyak Krivoi Rog; ✓ Dinamo Kuibyshev; ✓ Spartak Kuibyshev; ✓ Trudovaya Kommuna Kungur; ✓ Burevestnik Leningrad; ✓ Lokomotiv Leningrad	✓ Dinamo-Trudkommuna Lyubertry; ✓ Zavod imeni Kirova Makeyevka; ✓ Zavod imeni Lenina Mariupol; ✓ Dinamo Minsk; ✓ Burevestnik Moscow; ✓ CDKA-2 Moscow; ✓ Dinamo-2 Moscow; ✓ Energiya Moscow; ✓ Infizkult Moscow; ✓ Lokomotiv-2 Moscow ✓ Pravda Moscow; ✓ Proletarskaya Pobeda Moscow; ✓ Rekord Moscow; ✓ Rodina Moscow; ✓ Zavod imeni Marti Nikolayev; ✓ Krasnoye Znamia Noginsk; ✓ Spartak Omsk; ✓ Krasnoye Znamia Orekhovo-Zuyevo; ✓ Snaiper Podolsk; ✓ Burevestnik Rostov-na-Donu ✓ DonGosTabFabrika Rostov-na-Donu; ✓ Morskoy Zavod Sevastopol; ✓ DKA Smolensk; ✓ Dzerzhinets-STZ Stalingrad; ✓ Krasny Oktyabr Stalingrad; ✓ Dinamo Sverdlovsk; ✓ Dinamo Voronezh; ✓ Lokomotiv Voronezh; ✓ Krasnoye Znamia Yegoryevsk; ✓ Krylia Sovetov Zaporozhye

Source: []

Notes

- Withdrawn teams (no games played): CDKA-2 Moscow, Krasny Oktyabr Stalingrad, Krasnoye Znamia Orekhovo-Zuyevo, Gornyak Krivoi Rog, Dinamo Kuibyshev, Spartak Kuibyshev, Spartak Kalinin, Dinamo Baku, Dinamo Kiev, Dinamo Moscow, Avtozavod imeni Molotova Gorkiy, Dinamo Dnepropetrovsk (total 12) (Note: In his "Annals" Aksel Vartanyan stated that there were 11 withdrawn teams.)
- The 1936 USSR Football Championship (spring) runners-up, Dinamo Kiev, withdrew, officially due to players being sick. Still, later it became apparent that they were involved in creating the 1936 film Goalkeeper (Vratar). They forfeited their match against Krasnoye Znamia Yegoryevsk.
- Dinamo Moscow as the 1936 USSR Football Championship (spring) winners, were touring Czechoslovakia and were not able to participate. They forfeited their match against Stakhanovets Kadiyevka.

== Competition schedule ==
=== First round ===
[Jul 18]
Arsenal Kiev (KFK)           3-3 (KFK) Krasnoye Znamya Yegoryevsk        [aet]
  [Shpatenko 10 (o.g.), Tolstikov 15, Dubovik 20, ? – Kulakov, ?]
BOLSHEVIK Kiev (KFK)         w/o (KFK) CDKA-2 Moskva 
Burevestnik Leningrad (KFK)  2-6 (KFK) DINAMO-2 Moskva 
Burevestnik Rostov-na-Donu (KFK) 0-3 (KFK) INFIZKULT Moskva 
DZERZHINETS Bezhitsa (KFK)   2-1 (KFK) Lokomotiv Voronezh 
DINAMO Batumi (KFK)          7-1 (KFK) MedKombinat Alaverdi 
  [? – R.Gusov] 
DINAMO Chelyabinsk (KFK)     3-1 (KFK) Spartak Omsk 
  [G.Falkovskiy 29, 79, Isakov 70 pen – L.Shishkin (D) 57 og] 
DINAMO Krasnodar (KFK)       w/o (KFK) Krasny Oktyabr Stalingrad 
DINAMO Krivoi Rog (KFK)      5-0 (KFK) ZiI Mariupol  
Dinamo Minsk (KFK)           1-5 (KFK) PROLETARSKAYA POBEDA Moskva 
  [? – Babashin-3, Artyomov, Sakharov] 
DINAMO Voronezh (KFK)        w/o (KFK) Krasnoye Znamya Orekhovo-Zuyevo 
DINAMO-TRUDKOMMUNA Bolshevo (KFK) 5-0 (KFK) Lokomotiv Leningrad 
DZERZHINETS Bezhitsa (KFK)   2-1 (KFK) Lokomotiv Voronezh (repeated information)
KhPZ Kharkov (KFK)           3-1 (KFK) Sniper Podolsk 
KRASNOYE ZNAMYA Noginsk (KFK) w/o (KFK) Gornyak Krivoi Rog 
Krylya Sovetov Zaporozhye (KFK) 1-1 (KFK) Lokomotiv Kharkov              [aet]
  [Studennikov 100 – Saltosetskyi]
MORSKOI ZAVOD Sevastopol (KFK) 1-0 (KFK) Lokomotiv Dnepropetrovsk 
  [Kulikov] 
RECORD Moskva (KFK)          3-2 (KFK) Rodina Moskva  
SERP I MOLOT Kharkov (KFK)   3-1 (KFK) Dinamo-TrudKommuna Lyubertsy 
Spartak Ivanovo (KFK)        1-6 (KFK) LOKOMOTIV-2 Moskva 
  [Boris Shchibrov 29 - ?] 
STAL Konstantinovka (KFK)    3-1 (KFK) Burevestnik Moskva 
  [M.Lomov 10, A.Yakovlev 65, I.Gorobets 83 - ?] 
Zenit Izhevsk (KFK)          1-11 (KFK) DINAMO Sverdlovsk 
ZiD Dneprodzerzhinsk (KFK)   0-1 (KFK) PRAVDA Moskva                    [aet] 
ZiK Makeyevka (KFK)          0-3 (KFK) ELEKTROMASHZAVOD Kharkov 
ZIM Nikolayev (KFK)          3-0 (KFK) Spartak Kiev 
ZIP Dnepropetrovsk (KFK)    10-0 (KFK) Farforovy Zavod Baranovka   
ZIF Konstantinovka (KFK)     3-1 (KFK) Burevestnik Moskva (repeated information)
[Jul 19] 
DKA BVO Smolensk (KFK)       4-1 (KFK) Energiya Moskva 
[Jul 21]
DINAMO Aktyubinsk (KFK)      w/o (KFK) Dinamo Kuibyshev 
DZERZHINETS Kolomna (KFK)    w/o (KFK) Spartak Kuibyshev 
TRUDOVAYA KOMMUNA Kungur (KFK) w/o (KFK) Spartak Kalinin  
[Jul 22] 
DZERZHINETS-STZ Stalingrad (KFK) 4-0 (KFK) DonGosTabFabrika Rostov-na-Donu 
  [Alexandr Ponomaryov 17, 60 pen, Alexandr Sapronov 75, Sergei Kolesnikov 76]

==== First round replays ====
[Jul 19] 
Arsenal Kiev (KFK)           0-3 (KFK) KRASNOYE ZNAMYA Yegoryevsk 
[Jul 20] 
Krylya Sovetov Zaporozhye (KFK) 1-1 (KFK) Lokomotiv Kharkov                [aet] 
[Jul 26] 
Krylya Sovetov Zaporozhye (KFK) 0-5 (KFK) LOKOMOTIV Kharkov

=== Second round (Round of 64) ===
[Jul 24] 
Bolshevik Kiev                2-6  DINAMO Odessa 
DINAMO Gorkiy                 4-3  Record Moskva  
DINAMO Pyatigorsk             w/o  Pravda Moskva 
DINAMO Rostov-na-Donu         6-2  Proletarskaya Pobeda Moskva 
Dinamo Voronezh               0-2  SPARTAK Moskva 
  [Vladimir Stepanov 22, Georgiy Glazkov 76] 
DINAMO-TRUDKOMMUNA Bolshevo   6-1  Lokomotiv Kiev 
DZERZHINETS Bezhitsa          3-2  Krylya Sovetov Moskva 
  [N.Shilin 18, 50, A.Khomyakov ? - ?] 
Dzerzhinets Kolomna           0-9  SPARTAK Leningrad 
ELEKTROMASHZAVOD Kharkov      1-0  Stal Dnepropetrovsk 
  [A.Fyodorov 23] 
KRASNOYE ZNAMYA Noginsk       3-0  Ugolshchiki Stalino 
KRASNOYE ZNAMYA Yegoryevsk    w/o  Dinamo Kiev 
Morskoi Zavod Sevastopol      2-3  TRAKTORNY ZAVOD Kharkov 
  [A.Vyshnevskiy 33 pen, V.Shitikov 37 – V.Makarov 20, ?, ?] 
STAKHANOVETS Kadiyevka        w/o  Dinamo Moskva 
Trudovaya Kommuna Kungur      0-7  LOKOMOTIV Moskva  
  [Viktor Lavrov-4, ?, ?, ?] 
ZIM Nikolayev                 1-0  KinAp Odesa  
[Jul 25]
DINAMO-2 Moskva               3-0  Vympel Kiev  
Serp i Molot Kharkov          1-1  Stalinets Moskva 
  [Fyodor Lukyanchenko 50 – Sergei Ivanov 61] 
[Jul 26] 
Dinamo Aktyubinsk             0-4  CDKA Moskva 
  [Ivan Mitronov 52, ?, ?, ?] 
HPZ Kharkov                   0-2  ZIS Moskva 
  [Viktor Semyonov 67, K.Us (H) 75 og] 
Kolkhoz Chapayeva Zolotonosha 0-15 SERP I MOLOT Moskva 
  [Pavel Kudryavtsev 4, Grigoriy Fedotov 5, ?...] 
Lokomotiv-2 Moskva            1-7  STALINETS Leningrad 
  [? – K.Sazonov-2, Viktor Smagin, Alexei Larionov, Boris Ivin, Alexandr Zyablikov, Alexandr Gnezdov] 
ZiP Dnepropetrovsk            0-5  DINAMO Kharkov 
[Jul 27] 
DINAMO Kazan                  w/o  Dinamo Chelyabinsk 
DINAMO Sverdlovsk             w/o  GAZ Gorkiy 
DKA Smolensk                  2-3  KRASNAYA ZARYA Leningrad 
  [P.Petrov 40, 78 - ?] 
INFIZKULT Moskva              w/o  Dinamo Baku 
[Jul 28] 
Dinamo Batumi                 0-2  DINAMO Tiflis
  [Mikhail Berdzenishvili-2] 
Dinamo Krasnodar              0-3  LOKOMOTIV Tiflis
Dinamo Krivoi Rog             2-5  STROITELI Baku 
DZERZHINETS-STZ Stalingrad    w/o  Dinamo Dnepropetrovsk 
[Jul 30] 
Stal Konstantinovka           2-3  SPARTAK Kharkov 
[Aug 2] 
Lokomotiv Kharkov             2-2  Dinamo Leningrad             [aet] 
  [Boris Gurkin 6, 111 – Pyotr Dementyev 18, Boris Shelagin 118 pen]

==== Second round replays ====
[Jul 27] 
SERP I MOLOT Kharkov          2-1  Stalinets Moskva 
  [Georgiy Toporkov 52, Vladimir Prasolov 54 - ?] 
[Aug 4] 
Lokomotiv Kharkov             1-1  Dinamo Leningrad 
  [Zub 14 pen – Pyotr Dementyev 30] 
[Aug 7] 
Lokomotiv Kharkov             0-1  DINAMO Leningrad 
  [Pyotr Dementyev 43]

=== Third round (Round of 32) ===
[Jul 30] 
Dinamo Gorkiy (KFK)           0-2 (II) STALINETS Leningrad 
  [Viktor Smagin 68, Alexei Larionov 79] 
Dinamo-TrudKommuna Bolshevo (KFK) 0-2 (I) KRASNAYA ZARYA Leningrad 
  [Alexei Tsvilikh-2] 
SERP I MOLOT Kharkov (KFK)    5-1 (IV) Traktorny Zavod Kharkov 
  [Fyodor Morgunov 15, 65, Alexandr Timchenko 60 pen, Vladimir Prasolov 75, Georgiy Toporkov 78 – Ivan Gruber 81 pen] 
SERP I MOLOT Moskva (II)      3-2 (KFK) Dinamo-2 Moskva 
  [Grigoriy Fedotov 77, 85, Sergei Kuzin 86 - ?] 
Stakhanovets Kadiyevka (KFK)  0-2 (KFK) ELEKTROMASHZAVOD Kharkov      
ZiM Nikolayev (KFK)           0-3 (II) SPARTAK Leningrad 
[Aug 1] 
Dinamo Kharkov (II)           0-1 (I) LOKOMOTIV Moskva 
  [Viktor Lavrov 65 pen] 
[Aug 2] 
Dinamo Kazan (III)            1-2 (II) ZIS Moskva 
  [Ivan Borisevich 85 - ?] 
Krasnoye Znamya Yegoryevsk (KFK) 0-4 (KFK) KRASNOYE ZNAMYA Noginsk       
[Aug 3] 
DINAMO Tiflis (II)           3-2 (III) Stroiteli Baku               [aet] 
  [Mikhail Berdenishvili 17 pen, 67 pen, Mikhail Aslamazov 93 – Aram Stepanov 9, Arkadiy Amirjanov 90] 
Dzerzhinets Bezhitsa (KFK)    0-3 (KFK) DZERZHINETS-STZ Stalingrad  
  [A.Voyevodin 40, Alexandr Ponomaryov 57, 80] 
[Aug 4] 
SPARTAK Moskva (I)           4-0 (III) Spartak Kharkov 
  [Pyotr Nikiforov, Georgiy Glazkov, Leonid Rumyantsev, Stanislav Leuta] 
[Aug 6] 
Dinamo Sverdlovsk (KFK)      0-6 (III) DINAMO Rostov-na-Donu 
  [Sergei Dombazov, Viktor Berezhnoi, Valeriy Bekhtenev, Iosif Kurabo, ?, ?] 
[Aug 8] 
CDKA Moskva (I)               1-2 (IV) DINAMO Pyatigorsk 
  [Konstantin Malinin 15 - Vasiliy Motlokhov 38 pen, Tengiz Gavasheli 57] 
[Aug 10] 
Lokomotiv Tiflis (III)       2-2 (III) Dinamo Odessa 
  [Gayoz Jejelava 63, ? 68 – Leonid Orekhov 16, Makar Gichkin 44] 
[Aug 11] 
InFizKult Moskva (KFK)        1-4 (I) DINAMO Leningrad 
  [? – Nikolai Svetlov-2, Pyotr Dementyev-2]

==== Third round replays ====
[Aug 12] 
Lokomotiv Tiflis (III)       3-4 (III) DINAMO Odessa 
  [Georgiy Apridonidze 56, 81, Luasarb Loladze 60 - Mikhail Heison 35, 64, Leonid Orekhov 47, 69]

=== Fourth round (Round of 16) ===
[Aug 5]
LOKOMOTIV Moskva (I)          3-0 (II) Spartak Leningrad 
  [Viktor Lavrov, ?, ?]
[Aug 8] 
SERP I MOLOT Kharkov (KFK)   3-1 (KFK) ElektroMashZavod Kharkov 
  [Fyodor Morgunov 38, Vladimir Prasolov 42, ? 85 – A.Naprasnikov 44]
Stalinets Leningrad (II)     0-3 (I) SPARTAK Moskva 
  [Pyotr Nikiforov 15, Andrei Starostin 43, 87]
[Aug 12] 
Dzerzhinets-STZ Stalingrad (KFK) 1-3 (II) DINAMO Tiflis
  [Alexandr Ponomaryov 8 – Boris Paichadze 50, 87, Mikhail Berdzenishvili 64 pen]
[Aug 13] 
KRASNAYA ZARYA Leningrad (I)  2-1 (III) Dinamo Rostov-na-Donu 
  [Pyotr Artemyev 23, 72 – Viktor Berezhnoi 6]
ZIS Moskva (II)               4-2 (IV) Dinamo Pyatigorsk 
  [Viktor Semyonov 21, Alexei Shumov 27, Pyotr Ivanov ?, Anatoliy Yemelyanov ? – Vasiliy Motlokhov 43, 61] 
[Aug 17] 
DINAMO Leningrad (I)          3-2  (II) Serp i Molot Moskva 
  [Mikhail Butusov 31 pen, Pyotr Dementyev 61, 87 – Alexei Zaitsev 9, Grigoriy Fedotov 88]
[Aug 18] 
KRASNOYE ZNAMYA Noginsk (KFK) w/o (III) Dinamo Odessa

=== Quarterfinals ===
14 August 1936	Lokomotiv Moscow (I)	2–1	(KFK) Serp i Molot Kharkov	Moscow
	Lavrov (?) ? (?)	Report	Morgunov 38'	Stadium: Lokomotiv Stadium; Referee: Georgiy Feponov (Leningrad)

- The Kharkiv team tried to protest the match result due to poor refereeing, but their appeal was declined. While not refereeing for this match, one of referees Viktor Ryabokon was the president of the Lokomotiv sports society.

16 August 1936	Spartak Moscow (I)	3–3	(II) Dinamo Tiflis	Moscow
18:00	Glazkov 5' (pen.), 43', 45' (pen.)	Report	Aslamazov 26'; Paichadze 76'; Berdzenishvili 86' (pen.)	Stadium: Central Stadium "Dynamo"; Attendance: 20,000; Referee: Raymund Gofman (Leningrad)

- The match was interrupted due to lack of lighting and its extra time never played. It was decided to replay the match on 20 August and this match was annulled.

19 August 1936	Krasnaya Zarya Leningrad (I)	1–0	(II) ZiS Moscow	Leningrad
18:00	Yartsev 30'	Report		Stadium: imeni Lenina; Attendance: ? Referee: Lev Chernobylskiy (Kyiv)

21 August 1936	Krasnoye Znamya Noginsk (KFK)	1–0	(I) Dynamo Leningrad	Glukhovo
	Kuganov 73'	Report		Stadium: Krasnoye Znamia Stadium; Attendance: 5,000; Referee: Aleksandr Schelchkov (Moscow)

==== Quarterfinals replays ====
20 August 1936	Spartak Moscow (I)	3–6 (a.e.t.)	(II) Dinamo Tbilisi	Moscow
17:07	Glazkov 21' (pen.); Stepanov 81', 83'; Ryzhov 108' (o.g.)	Report	Somov 23', 113'; Paichadze 27', 98'; Aslamazov 64'	Stadium: Central Stadium "Dynamo"; Attendance: 25,000; Referee: Nikolay Usov (Leningrad)

- On 17 August 1936 officially in the Soviet Union, there was adopted a Georgian name for Tiflis, Tbilisi.

=== Semifinals ===
23 August 1936	Lokomotiv Moscow (I)	5–0	(I) Krasnaya Zarya Leningrad	Moscow
17:05	Lavrov 20', 49' (pen.), 89'; Sokolov 52'; Semyonov 71'	Report		Stadium: Lokomotiv Stadium; Attendance: 15,000; Referee: Vladimir Strepikheyev (Moscow)

25 August 1936	Krasnoye Znamya Noginsk (KFK)	1–5	(II) Dinamo Tbilisi	Moscow
17:00	Zharkov 31'	Report	Aslamazov 20', 74'; Somov 22'; Panin 87'; Dzhorbenadze 88'	Stadium: Central Stadium "Dynamo"; Attendance: 10,000; Referee: Viktor Ryabokon (Moscow)

=== Final ===
1936-08-28
17:00 LST

Lokomotiv Moscow (I)	2 – 0	(II) Dinamo Tbilisi
Sokolov 18'; Lavrov 24'	Report

Central Stadium "Dynamo", Moscow
Attendance: 22,000
Referee: Nikolay Usov (Leningrad)

== Top goalscorers ==
Statistical data is incomplete and based on rounds starting from the fourth round (Round of 16).

Scorer	Team	Goals
Viktor Lavrov	Lokomotiv Moscow	6 (1)
Boris Paichadze	Dinamo Tbilisi	5
Mikhail Aslamazov	Dinamo Tbilisi	4
Georgiy Glazkov	Spartak Moscow	4 (3)
Nikolay Somov	Dinamo Tbilisi	3

== Bracket ==
Round of 64
ZiP Dnepropetrovsk	0
Dinamo Kharkov	5
Trudovaya Kommuna Kungur	0
Lokomotiv Moscow	7
ZiM Nikolayev	1
KinAp Odessa	0
Dzerzhinets Kolomna	0
Spartak Leningrad	9
Serp i Molot Kharkov (replay)	2(1)
Stalinets Moscow	1(1)
Morskoi Zavod Sevastopol	2
Traktorny Zavod Kharkov	3
Stakhanovets Kadiyevka	+
Dynamo Moscow	–
EMZ Kharkov	1
Stal Dnepropetrovsk	0
Dinamo-TrudKommuna	6
Lokomotiv Kiev	1
DKA Smolensk	2
Krasnaya Zarya Leningrad	3
Dinamo Sverdlovsk	+
GAZ Gorkiy	–
Dinamo Rostov-na-Donu	6
Proletarskaya Pobeda Moscow	2
Dinamo Kazan	+
Dinamo Chelyabinsk	–
KhPZ Kharkov	0
ZiS Moscow	2
Dinamo Aktyubinsk	0
CDKA Moscow	4
Dinamo Pyatigorsk	+
Pravda Moscow	–
Dinamo Gorkiy	4
Record Moscow	3
Lokomotiv-2 Moscow	1
Stalinets Leningrad	7
Dinamo Voronezh	0
Spartak Moscow	2
Stal Konstantinovka	2
Spartak Kharkov	3
Dzerzhinets Bezhitsa	3
Krylya Sovetov Moscow	2
Dzerzhinets-STZ Stalingrad	+
Dinamo Dnepropetrovsk	–
Dinamo Batumi	0
Dinamo Tbilisi	2
Dinamo Krivoi Rog	2
Stroiteli Baku	5
Krasnoye Znamya Yegoryevsk	+
Dinamo Kiev	–
Krasnoye Znamya Noginsk	3
Ugolschiki Stalino	0
Dinamo Krasnodar	0
Lokomotiv Tbilisi	3
Bolshevik Kiev	2
Dinamo Odessa	6
InFizKult Moscow	+
Dinamo Baku	–
Lokomotiv Kharkov	0(1)(2)
Dinamo Leningrad (2 replays)	1(1)(2)
Kolkhoz imeni Chapayeva	0
Serp i Molot Moscow	15
Dinamo-2 Moscow	3
Vympel Kiev	0

Round of 32
Dinamo Kharkov	0
Lokomotiv Moscow	1
ZiM Nikolayev	0
Spartak Leningrad	3
Serp i Molot Kharkov	5
Traktorny Zavod Kharkov	1
Stakhanovets Kadiyevka	0
EMZ Kharkov	2
Dinamo-TrudKommuna	0
Krasnaya Zarya Leningrad	2
Dinamo Sverdlovsk	0
Dinamo Rostov-na-Donu	6
Dinamo Kazan	1
ZiS Moscow	2
CDKA Moscow	1
Dinamo Pyatigorsk	2
Dinamo Gorkiy	0
Stalinets Leningrad	2
Spartak Moscow	4
Spartak Kharkov	0
Dzerzhinets Bezhitsa	0
Dzerzhinets-STZ Stalingrad	3
Dinamo Tbilisi (a.e.t.)	3
Stroiteli Baku	2
Krasnoye Znamya Yegoryevsk	0
Krasnoye Znamya Noginsk	4
Lokomotiv Tbilisi	3(2)
Dinamo Odessa (replay)	4(2)
InFizKult Moscow	1
Dynamo Leningrad	4
Serp i Molot Moscow	3
Dinamo-2 Moscow	2

Round of 16
Lokomotiv Moscow	3
Spartak Leningrad	0
Serp i Molot Kharkov	3
EMZ Kharkov	1
Krasnaya Zarya Leningrad	2
Dinamo Rostov-na-Donu	1
ZiS Moskva	4
Dinamo Pyatigorsk	2
Stalinets Leningrad	0
Spartak Moscow	3
Dzerzhinets-STZ Stalingrad	1
Dinamo Tbilisi	3
Krasnoye Znamya Noginsk	+
Dinamo Odessa	–
Dynamo Leningrad	3
Serp i Molot Moscow	2

Quarterfinals
Lokomotiv Moscow	2
Serp i Molot Kharkov	1
Krasnaya Zarya Leningrad	1
ZiS Moskva	0
Spartak Moskva	3(3)
Dinamo Tbilisi (replay)	6(3)
Krasnoye Znamya Noginsk	1
Dynamo Leningrad	0

Semifinals
Lokomotiv Moscow	5
Krasnaya Zarya Leningrad	0
Dinamo Tbilisi	5
Krasnoye Znamya Noginsk	1

Final
Lokomotiv Moscow	2
Dinamo Tbilisi	0

== Number of teams by union republic ==
Rank	Union republic	Number of teams
1	RSFSR	6 (A); 5 (B); 2 (V); 3 (G); 39 (KFK); 55 (Total)
2	Ukrainian SSR	1 (A); 2 (B); 4 (V); 2 (G); 22 (KFK); 31 (Total)
3	Georgian SSR	1 (B); 1 (V); 1 (KFK); 3 (Total)
4	Azerbaijan SSR	1 (V); 1 (KFK); 2 (Total)
5	Kazakh SSR	1 (KFK); 1 (Total)
5	Armenian SSR	1 (KFK); 1 (Total)
5	Belarusian SSR	1 (KFK); 1 (Total)

Notes

- In the world of the Soviet football the teams from the RSFSR often were split into two/three categories: Moscow, Leningrad and the rest of RSFSR or Capital cities and the rest of RSFSR.
  - The Moscow-based teams: 4 (A), 3 (B), 1 (G), 10 (KFK), 18 (total)
  - The Leningrad-based teams: 2 (A), 2 (B), 2 (KFK), 6 (total)
  - The rest of RSFSR teams: 2 (V), 2 (G), 27 (KFK), 31 (total)

== See also ==
- 1936 Cup of the Ukrainian SSR
