= 1936 Group B (Soviet football championship) =

Group B
- Season: 1936

The 1936 Soviet First League spring season was the first second tier tournament of the Soviet official football competitions. The season started on May 22, 1936, and stretched through July 15, 1936. The only game between the capital's teams Stalinets and Serp i Molot took place at the Stalinets Stadium (used to stand where today Lokomotiv Stadium stands).

== Spring 1936 ==
=== Teams ===
In the beginning, it was expected that Lokomotiv Tbilisi would be playing in Group B, but later they switched with Dinamo Tbilisi taking their place in the lower Group V.

=== Competition format ===
The winner was planned to play off against the poorest performer of the Group A. The bottom team was planned to be relegated. Wins were accounted for 3 points, draws - 2 points, losses - 1 point, and no-show - no points.

=== Final standings ===
Pos	Republic	Team	Pld	W	D	L	GF	GA	GD	Pts	Promotion or relegation
1	Georgian SSR	Dinamo Tbilisi (P)	6	5	1	0	19	4	+15	17	Promoted
2	Russian SFSR	Zavod imeni Stalina Moscow	6	3	1	2	10	7	+3	13	
3	Russian SFSR	Stalinets Leningrad	6	2	3	1	9	9	0	13	
4	Russian SFSR	Stalinets Moscow	6	1	4	1	8	9	−1	12	
5	Russian SFSR	Serp i Molot Moscow	6	1	2	3	7	8	−1	10	
6	Russian SFSR	Spartak Leningrad	6	1	2	3	8	17	−9	10	
7	Ukrainian SSR	Dinamo Dnepropetrovsk (R)	6	1	1	4	7	14	−7	9	
8	Ukrainian SSR	Dinamo Kharkov (R)	0	-	-	-	-	-	—	0	Withdrew - results annulled

Source: RSSSF
(P) Promoted; (R) Relegated

=== Withdrawn teams ===
==== Dynamo Kharkiv ====
Dynamo Kharkiv withdrew from the competition due to health problems of its players. The club had played against Stalinets Moscow, Stalinets Leningrad, and ZiS Moscow having on record 3 games with 0 wins, 1 draw, 2 losses, and goals ratio 3 - 9. All the records were annulled.

=== Top goalscorers ===
	Scorer	Goals (Pen.)	Team
1	Boris Paichadze	7	Dinamo Tbilisi
2	Viktor Semyonov	5	Stalin Factory Moscow
3	Mikhail Aslamov	4	Dinamo Tbilisi
3	Mikhail Berdzenishvili	4	Dinamo Tbilisi
3	Grigoriy Fedotov	4	Serp i Molot Moscow
3	Viktor Krivosheyev	4	FC Dynamo Dnipropetrovsk

== 1936 Fall ==
=== Overview ===
This tournament was exact replica of the spring championship by the format of the competition, including the nomination of points.

=== League standings ===
Pos	Republic	Team	Pld	W	D	L	GF	GA	GD	Pts	Promotion or relegation
1	Russian SFSR	Serp i Molot Moscow (P)	7	6	0	1	25	6	+19	19	Promoted
2	Azerbaijan SSR	Temp Baku	7	5	1	1	16	7	+9	18	
3	Russian SFSR	Stalinets Moscow	7	4	1	2	13	10	+3	16	
4	Russian SFSR	Torpedo Moscow	7	4	0	3	11	7	+4	15	
5	Russian SFSR	Dinamo Rostov-na-Donu	7	3	0	4	13	18	−5	13	
6	Russian SFSR	Stalinets Leningrad	7	2	1	4	6	13	−7	12	
7	Russian SFSR	Spartak Leningrad	7	1	2	4	8	13	−5	11	
8	Ukrainian SSR	Selmash Kharkov (R)	7	0	1	6	6	24	−18	8	Relegated

(P) Promoted; (R) Relegated

== See also ==
- Soviet First League
- 1936 Group A (Soviet football championship) – top tier
- 1936 Group V (Soviet football championship) – third tier
- 1936 Group G (Soviet football championship) – fourth tier
- 1936 Soviet Cup
