= 1936 Soviet Football Championship, Gruppa G =

The point nomination system was as the upper level tiers and somewhat strange than the ordinary one. For a win there was a nomination of three points, a draw - two points, and a loss would earn a point. For a failure to appear a point was deducted and the technical loss would be nominated.

== League standings ==
=== The spring championship ===
The highest scoring game was between the Piatigorsk's and the Gorky's clubs ending in 7:3.

Pos	Republic	Team	Pld	W	D	L	GF	GA	GD	Pts
1	Ukrainian SSR	FC Traktor Plant Kharkiv	4	3	1	0	9	3	+6	11
2	Russian SFSR	FC Krylya Sovetov Moscow	4	2	1	1	5	4	+1	9
3	Russian SFSR	FC Dynamo Piatigorsk	4	2	0	2	11	8	+3	8
4	Ukrainian SSR	FC Stal Dnipropetrovsk	4	2	0	2	3	5	−2	8
5	Russian SFSR	FC Molotov Automobile Plant Gorky	4	0	0	4	5	13	−8	3 (Note: The Gorky's Club was docked a point for a failure to play a scheduled game against the Dnipropetrovsk's club.)

Source: RSSSF

=== The fall championship ===
The highest scoring game was between the Dnipropetrovsk's and the Kyiv's clubs ending in 2:4.

Pos	Republic	Team	Pld	W	D	L	GF	GA	GD	Pts
1	Ukrainian SSR	FC Traktor Plant Kharkiv	5	3	1	1	9	6	+3	12
2	Ukrainian SSR	FC Stal Dnipropetrovsk	5	2	1	2	13	10	+3	10
3	Ukrainian SSR	FC Lokomotyv Kyiv	5	1	3	1	7	6	+1	10
4	Russian SFSR	FC Dynamo Gorky	5	2	1	2	5	6	−1	10
5	Russian SFSR	FC Traktor Stalingrad	5	2	1	2	5	9	−4	10
6	Ukrainian SSR	FC Frunze Plant Kostiantynivka (Note: 1 point deducted?)	5	1	1	3	3	5	−2	7

Source: RSSSF

== See also ==
- Soviet Second League B
- Soviet Second League 1936
- Soviet First League 1936
- 1936 Soviet Top League
