= 1945 Soviet First League =

Soviet First League
- Season: 1945

The 1945 Soviet First League was the first post-war season and the fifth since the establishing of the second tier. The tier was named the Second Group which before carried name Group B.

After the World War II some team managed to preserve themselves since the last season which was played five years ago in 1940. The following teams returned to the league Spartak Leningrad, Pishchevik Odessa, Torpedo Gorky, Dinamo (Spartak) Yerevan. From all Ukrainian teams (4) that took part in the war championship of the Top League, only Dynamo were allowed to stay while the other three were placed in a tier below. Notable is the fact that season saw participation of two teams from the Moscow Military District (VVS and MVO) both of which finished at the top of season table, yet missing a promotion after allowing Krylya Sovetov to squeeze by.

== Teams ==
- Former Gruppa A participants:
  - FC Stakhanovets Stalino
  - FC Pishchevik Odessa
- Former Gruppa B participants
  - FC Spartak Leningrad
  - FC Dinamo Yerevan (before the war Spartak Yerevan)
  - FC Torpedo Gorkiy
  - FC Tekstilschik Ivanovo (last played in 1939)

== League standings ==
Pos	Team	Pld	W	D	L	GF	GA	GD	Pts	Qualification
1	FC Krylia Sovetov Kuibyshev (P)	17	12	3	2	37	20	+17	27	
2	VVS Moscow	17	9	6	2	32	12	+20	24	
3	MVO Moscow	17	10	4	3	37	16	+21	24	
4	DKA Tbilisi	17	8	7	2	22	15	+7	23	
5	FC Stakhanovets Stalino	17	9	5	3	36	25	+11	23	
6	FC Torpedo Gorky	17	8	4	5	43	30	+13	20	
7	FC Pishchevik Odessa	17	9	1	7	26	22	+4	19	
8	FC Lokomotiv Kharkov	17	5	6	6	31	27	+4	16	
9	FC Krylya Sovetov Molotov	17	7	2	8	33	30	+3	16	
10	FC Tekstilshchik Ivanovo	17	7	1	9	23	32	−9	15	
11	DKA Novosibirsk	17	7	0	10	21	27	−6	14	
12	FC Dinamo Yerevan	17	5	4	8	24	31	−7	14	
13	FC Traktor Chelyabinsk	17	5	4	8	18	30	−12	14	
14	FC Dinamo Baku (R)	17	3	7	7	17	25	−8	13	Relegation to republican competitions
15	KBF Leningrad (R)	17	5	3	9	21	31	−10	13	Relegation to republican competitions
16	FC Uralmash Sverdlovsk (R)	17	5	2	10	26	39	−13	12	Relegation to republican competitions
17	FC Spartak Leningrad	17	4	2	11	23	40	−17	10	
18	FC Trudovye Rezervy Moscow	17	2	5	10	22	40	−18	9	

Source: footballfacts.ru
(P) Promoted; (R) Relegated

== Number of teams by republics ==
Number	Union republics	Team(s)
12	Russian SFSR	VVS Moscow, MVO Moscow, KBF Leningrad, FC Spartak Leningrad, FC Trudovye Rezervy Moscow FC Tekstilschik Ivanovo, FC Krylia Sovetov Kuibyshev, FC Torpedo Gorky, FC Krylia Sovetov Molotov, FC Traktor Chelyabinsk, FC Uralmash Sverdlovsk, DKA Novosibirsk
3	Ukrainian SSR	FC Stakhanovets Stalino, FC Pischevik Odessa, FC Lokomotiv Kharkov
1	Georgian SSR	DKA Tbilisi
1	Armenian SSR	FC Dinamo Yerevan
1	Azerbaijan SSR	FC Dinamo Baku

== See also ==
- Soviet First League
- 1945 Soviet First Group
