= Soviet First League =

Association football league in the Soviet Union

Soviet First League in football
- Founded: 1936
- Folded: 1991 after 52 seasons
- Country: Soviet Union
- Level on pyramid: 2
- Promotion to: Soviet Top League
- Relegation to: Soviet Second League
- League cup(s): First League Cup; Podsnezhnik tournament
- Last champions: FC Rotor Volgograd (1)
- Most championships: FC Krylya Sovetov Samara (5)

The Soviet First League in football (Russian: Первая лига СССР по футболу) was the second highest division of Soviet football, below the Soviet Top League.

While the second tier competitions in football among "teams of masters" (an official term for the Soviet professional clubs) existed since 1936, the First League has been officially formed in 1971 out of the Class A First Group. It followed the transitional 1970 season when the Class A was expanded to three groups (Vysshaya Gruppa, Pervaya Gruppa, Vtoraya Gruppa) and discontinuation of the Class B competitions for the 1971 season.

The league existed until the dissolution of the Soviet Union in 1991.

== Overview ==
The second tier competitions and predecessors of the First League has been known as Group B, Group 2, Class B, and Class A, group 2. The number of teams playing at this level fluctuated significantly during the history of Soviet football. In 1940s-1970s the league frequently consisted of several groups. The group winners qualified for the final tournament.

The second tier competitions among "teams of masters" existed since 1936 as part of four groups of eight All-Union competitions where each group represented a tier with Group A representing top tier, Group B representing second tier, Group V representing third tier and so on. Before the World War II the season competitions were inconsistent in every group.

Since after the World War II there existed only top two tiers for football competitions among "teams of masters". The top tier was called Pervaya Gruppa (First Group) and the second tier Vtoraya Gruppa (Second Group). In 1950 those tiers were renamed with the second tier competitions being renamed into the Class B (the top tier became the Class A).

In 1960 Class B competitions were transformed into regional competitions with separate competitions for Russia, Ukraine, and other republics. More transformations took place in 1963 when the second tier competitions were included in the Class A competitions, while the Class B competitions were shifted to the third tier for 1964 season, thus reviving the third level competitions. Following the 1963 reform, the second tier competitions became the Vtoraya Gruppa Classa A (Class A second group) and the top tier being renamed as the Pervaya Gruppa Classa A (Class A first group). The Vtoraya Gruppa did not have multi groups competition with only one group round robin tournament.

After the 1970-1971 reforms there was established the Soviet First League with a single group competition. The league became more consisted with number of teams in league and relegation/promotion rules.

- 1936-1940 Gruppa B (no competition in 1938)
- 1945-1949 Vtoraya Gruppa
- 1950-1962 Class B
- 1963-1969 Vtoraya Gruppa (Class A)
- 1970-1970 Pervaya Gruppa (Class A)
- 1971-1991 Pervaya Liga

One unusual feature of the league was one that have taken place before 1989. The Soviet Football Union tried to eliminate the growing number of drawn games, thus, intensify the competition. The participated clubs were receiving a point for each drawn game, but the number of all their drawn games could not exceed a third of all their games played. After that they received no points for any further draws that they earned. In 1987, for example, FC Fakel Voronezh was relegated by being short of a point having received no points for their two extra drawn games.

== Laureates of the Soviet second tier competitions ==
The teams that either won its group or participated in play-offs are included as well. All seasons are double-round robin unless otherwise indicated in "Notes".

=== Gruppa B (Group B) ===
Season	Winner	Runners-up	Third	Teams
1936 (spring)	Dinamo Tiflis	ZIS Moscow	Stalinets Leningrad	8
1936 (autumn)	Serp i Molot Moscow	Temp Baku	Stalinets Moscow	8
1937	Spartak Leningrad	FC Dynamo Rostov/Don	Temp Baku	7 (8*)
1938	not held, part of the Super League			
1939	Krylya Sovetov Moscow	Lokomotivi Tbilisi	FC Dynamo Rostov/Don	23
1940	Krasnaya Zarya Leningrad	FC Spartak Leningrad	Stroitel Baku	14
1941-44	no competition due to World War II			

=== Vtoraya Gruppa (Second Group) ===
Season	Winner		Runners-up	Third	Teams	
1945	Krylya Sovetov Kuybyshev		VVS Moscow	FC Moscow Military District	18	
1946	South	VVS Moscow	DO Tbilisi	FC Lokomotiv Kharkov	13	26
1946	East	FC Pischevik Moscow	FC Torpedo Gorky	FC MVO Moscow	13	26
1946	Final	VVS Moscow	Pischevik Moscow		2	
1947	Central	FC Lokomotiv Moscow	FC MVO Moscow	FC Dynamo Riga	15	67
1947	Russia I	FC Torpedo Gorky	FC Dynamo Saratov	FC Zenit Izhevsk	12	67
1947	Russia II	FC Dzerzhinets Chelyabinsk	ODO Novosibirsk	FC Krylia Sovetov Molotov	10	67
1947	Ukraine	FC Lokomotyv Kharkiv	FC Shakhtar Donetsk	FC Kharchovyk Odessa	13	67
1947	Caucasus	ODO Tbilisi	FC Dynamo Yerevan	FC Lokomotivi Tbilisi	8	67
1947	Middle Asia	FC Dynamo Stalinabad	FC Dynamo Alma-Ata	FC Dynamo Tashkent	9	67
1947	Final	Lokomotiv Moscow	Torpedo Gorkiy	Lokomotyv Kharkiv	6	
1948	Central	FC Metallurg Moscow	FC Dynamo Riga	FC MVO Moscow	15	75
1948	Russia I	FC Dynamo Kazan	FC Torpedo Gorky	FC Krasnoye Znamia Ivanovo	14	75
1948	Russia II	FC Dzerzhinets Chelyabinsk	ODO Novosibirsk	ODO Sverdlovsk	13	75
1948	Ukraine	FC Lokomotyv Kharkiv	FC Stal Dnipropetrovsk	ODO Kyiv	4 (8/8)	75
1948	South	FC Dynamo Yerevan	ODO Tbilisi	FC Spartaki Tbilisi	10	75
1948	Middle Asia	ODO Tashkent	FC Dynamo Alma-Ata	FC Lokomotiv Ashkhabat	7	75
1948	Final	Lokomotyv Kharkiv	Metallurg Moscow	Dynamo Yerevan	6	
1949	Central	FC Spartaki Tbilisi	FC Dynamo Kutaisi	Spartakas Vilnius	14	84
1949	Russia I	FC Dynamo Rostov-on-Don	FC VMS Moscow	FC Dynamo Krasnodar	11	84
1949	Russia II	DO Sverdlovsk	DO Novosibirsk	FC Dzerzhinets Chelyabinsk	14	84
1949	Russia III	FC Sudostroitel Leningrad	DO Leningrad	FC Metallurg Moscow	13	84
1949	Russia IV	FC Kalinin Kaliningrad	FC Stroitel Dulevo	FC Krasnoe Znamya Orekhovo-Zuyevo	14	84
1949	Ukraine	FC Kharchovyk Odessa	FC Spartak Lviv	ODO Kyiv	18	84
1949	Final	Spartak Tbilisi	Kalinin Kaliningrad	Kharchovyk Odessa	7	

=== Class B ===
Season	Winner		Runners-up	Third	Teams	
1950	VMS Moscow		Torpedo Gorkiy	Spartakas Vilnius	14	
1951	Kalinin		Dinamo Minsk	Lokomotiv Moscow	18	
1952	Kharkiv	Spartakas Vilnius	FC Lokomotyv Kharkiv	FC VMS Moscow	6	17
1952	Ivanovo	DO Tbilisi	FC Krasnoe Znamya Ivanovo	FC Dinamo Alma-Ata	6	17
1952	Baku	Neftyanik Baku	FC Burevestnik Chișinău	FC Torpedo Gorky	5	17
1952	Final	Lokomotyv Kharkiv	Spartakas Vilnius	DO Tbilisi	9 / 9	18
1953	Zone 1	FC Spartaki Tbilisi	FC Dynamo Yerevan	FC Torpedo Rostov-on-Don	9	27
1953	Zone 2	FC Znamya Ivanovo	FC Dinamo Minsk	FC Metalurh Odessa	10	27
1953	Zone 3	FC Shakhtar Stalino	FC Torpedo Gorky	FC Metalurh Zaporizhia	8	27
1953	Final	Dinamo Minsk	Torpedo Gorkiy	Shakhtar Stalino	6/3/3/3/3/3/3	
1954	Zone 1	FC Spartak Yerevan	Neftyanik Baku	ODO Tbilisi	12	36
1954	Zone 2	FC Zenit Moscow	Spartakas Vilnius	FC Khimik Moscow	12	36
1954	Zone 3	FC Shakhtar Stalino	FC Torpedo Rostov-on-Don	FC Metalurh Zaporizhia	12	36
1954	Final	Shakhtar Stalino	Spartakas Vilnius	Neftyanik Baku	6	
1955	Zone 1	Burevestnik Chisinau	Spartak Kalinin	ODO Kiev	16	32
1955	Zone 2	ODO Sverdlovsk	Spartak Yerevan	ODO Tbilisi	16	32
1956	Zone 1	Spartak Minsk	Torpedo Taganrog	Metalurh Zaporizhia	18	36
1956	Zone 2	Krylya Sovetov Kuybyshev	ODO Tbilisi	Spartak Yerevan	18	36
1957	Zone 1	FC Avangard Leningrad	FC Torpedo Taganrog	FC Avanhard Kharkiv	18	64
1957	Zone 2	FC Spartak Stanislav	SKVO Lviv	FC Trudovyie Rezervy Leningrad	18	64
1957	Zone 3	SKVO Tbilisi	FC Spartak Yerevan	Neftyanik Baku	16	64
1957	Far East	SKVO Khabarovsk	FC Dynamo Vladivostok	FC Burevestnik Tomsk	12	64
1957	Final	Avangard Leningrad	Spartak Stanislav	SKVO Tbilisi	3	
1958	Zone 1	SKVO Odessa	FC Trudovyie Rezervy Leningrad	FC Avanhard Mykolaiv	16	94
1958	Zone 2	SKCF Sevastopol	FC Metalurh Zaporizhia	FC Rostselmash Rostov-on-Don	16	94
1958	Zone 3	SKVO Lviv	Spartak Minsk	FC Lokomotyv Vinnytsia	16	94
1958	Zone 4	SKVO Rostov-on-Don	FC Spartak Yerevan	FC Kuban Krasnodar	16	94
1958	Zone 5	SKVO Sverdlovsk	FC Kairat Alma-Ata	FC Zvezda Perm	16	94
1958	Zone 6	SKVO Khabarovsk	FC Tomich Tomsk	FC Urozhai Barnaul	14	94
1958	Final	SKVO Rostov-na-Donu	SKVO Sverdlovsk	SKCF Sevastopol	6	
1959	Zone 1	FC Trud Voronezh	FC Dynamo Kirov	FC Avanhard Mykolaiv	15	101
1959	Zone 2	FC Trudovyie Rezervy Leningrad	FC Trud Glukhovo	FC Avanhard Kharkiv	15	101
1959	Zone 3	FC Spartak Yerevan	FC Terek Grozny	FC Torpedo Taganrog	14	101
1959	Zone 4	FC Lokomotyv Vinnytsia	FC Baltika Kaliningrad	SKVO Odessa	15	101
1959	Zone 5	FC Admiralteyets Leningrad	FC Volga Kalinin	FC Zenit Izhevsk	14	101
1959	Zone 6	FC Pamir Leninabad	FC Mashinostroitel Sverdlovsk	FC Metallurg Magnitogorsk	14	101
1959	Zone 7	SKVO Sverdlovsk	FC Lokomotiv Krasnoyarsk	SKVO Khabarovsk	14	101
1959	Russia Final	Admiralteyets Leningrad	Trudovyie Reservy Leningrad	Trud Voronezh	4	
1960	Russia I	FC Trud Voronezh	FC Spartak Leningrad	FC Shakhter Stalinogorsk	16	74
1960	Russia II	FC Volga Kalinin	FC Shinnik Yaroslavl	FC Dynamo Kirov	15	74
1960	Russia III	FC Terek Grozny	FC Torpedo Taganrog	FC Spartak Krasnodar	14	74
1960	Russia IV	FC Metallurg Nizhny Tagil	FC Zvezda Perm	FC Lokomotiv Chelyabinsk	15	74
1960	Russia V	FC Irtysh Omsk	SKA Khabarovsk	FC Sibelektromotor Tomsk	14	74
1960	Russia Final	Trud Voronezh	FC Irtysh Omsk	Volga Kalinin	5	
1960	Ukraine I	Sudnobudivnyk Mykolaiv	FC Lokomotyv Vinnytsia	FC Arsenal Kyiv	17	36
1960	Ukraine II	FC Metalurh Zaporizhia	SKA Odessa	FC Trudovi Rezervy Luhansk	19	36
1960	Ukraine Final	Metalurh Zaporizhzhya	Sudobudivnyk Mykolaiv		2	
1960	Republics I	FC Lokomotivi Tbilisi	FC Urozhai Minsk	FC Shirak Leninakan	16	32
1960	Republics II	FC Torpedo Kutaisi	FC Pamir Leninabad	FC Progress Baku	16	32
1960	Republics Final	Torpedo Kutaisi	Lokomotivi Tbilisi		2	
1961	Russia I	FC Volga Kalinin	FC Metallurg Cherepovets	FC Dynamo Leningrad	13	78
1961	Russia II	FC Dynamo Kirov	FC Baltika Kaliningrad	FC Iskra Kazan	13	78
1961	Russia III	FC Krylia Sovietov Kuibyshev	FC Sokol Saratov	FC Traktor Stalingrad	13	78
1961	Russia IV	FC Terek Grozny	FC Rostselmash Rostov-on-Don	FC Torpedo Taganrog	13	78
1961	Russia V	FC Lokomotiv Chelyabinsk	FC Uralmash Sverdlovsk	FC Stroitel Ufa	13	78
1961	Russia VI	SKA Khabarovsk	SKA Novosibirsk	FC Luch Vladivostok	13	78
1961	Russia Final	Krylya Sovetov Kuybyshev	Terek Grozny	Dynamo Kirov	6	
1961	Ukraine I	FC Chornomorets Odessa	FC Lokomotyv Vinnytsia	FC Zirka Kirovohrad	18	37
1961	Ukraine II	SKA Odessa	FC Trudovi Rezervy Luhansk	FC Avanhard Zhovti Vody	19	37
1961	Ukraine Final	Chornomorets Odessa	SCA Odessa	Lokomotyv Vinnytsia	playoffs	
1961	Republics I	FC Lokomotivi Tbilisi	FC Shirak Leninakan	Lokomotiv Gomel	16	32
1961	Republics II	FC Torpedo Kutaisi	FC Shakhter Karaganda	FC Metallurg Rustavi	16	32
1962	Russia I	FC Shinnik Yaroslavl	FC Spartak Leningrad	FC Tekstilshchik Ivanovo	17	79
1962	Russia II	FC Trud Voronezh	FC Trudovyie Rezervy Kursk	FC Serpukhov	16	79
1962	Russia III	FC Spartak Krasnodar	FC Traktor Volgograd	FC Rostselmash Rostov-on-Don	15	79
1962	Russia IV	FC Uralmash Sverdlovsk	FC Lokomotiv Chelyabinsk	FC Iskra Kazan	16	79
1962	Russia V	SKA Novosibirsk	SKA Khabarovsk	FC Luch Vladivostok	15	79
1962	Russia Final	Spartak Krasnodar	Trud Voronezh	Uralmash Sverdlovsk	5	
1962	Ukraine I	FC Chornomorets Odessa	FC Polissya Zhytomyr	FC Lokomotyv Donetsk	13	39
1962	Ukraine II	SKA Odessa	FC Metalurh Zaporizhia	SKA Kyiv	13	39
1962	Ukraine III	FC Trudovi Rezervy Luhansk	Avanhard Simferopol	FC Lokomotyv Vinnytsia	13	39
1962	Ukraine Final	Trudovye Rezervy Lugansk	Chornomorets Odessa	Avanhard Simferopol	6/11/11/11	
1962	Republics I	Lokomotiv Gomel	FC Shirak Leninakan	FC Nairi Yerevan	17	32
1962	Republics II	FC Shakhter Karaganda	FC Alga Frunze	FC Metallurg Chimkent	15	32
1962	Republics Final	Shakhtyor Karaganda	Lokomotiv Gomel		2	

=== Vtoraya Gruppa Klassa A (Second Group of the Class A) ===
Season	Winner		Runners-up	Third	Teams	
1963	Shinnik Yaroslavl		Torpedo Gorkiy	Trud Voronezh	18	
1964	Subgroup 1	FC Avanhard Kharkiv	FC Chornomorets Odessa	Žalgiris Vilnius	13	27
1964	Subgroup 2	SCA Odessa	FC Shakhter Karaganda	Lokomotiv Moscow	14	27
1964	Final	Lokomotiv Moscow	SCA Odessa	Pakhtakor Tashkent	14 / 13	
1965	Subgroup 1	FC Tekstilshchik Ivanovo	FC Uralmash Sverdlovsk	FC Avanhard Kharkiv	16	32
1965	Subgroup 2	FC Shinnik Yaroslavl	FC Zorya Luhansk	Žalgiris Vilnius	16	32
1965	Final	Ararat Yerevan	Kairat Alma-Aty	Avanhard Kharkiv	16 / 16	
1966	Subgroup 1	Žalgiris Vilnius	FC Tekstilshchik Ivanovo	FC Kuban Krasnodar	17	53
1966	Subgroup 2	FC Zorya Luhansk	SKA Kyiv	SKA Lviv	18	53
1966	Subgroup 3	FC Politodel	FC Shakhter Karaganda	FC Stroitel Ufa	18	53
1966	Final	Zorya Luhansk	Žalgiris Vilnius	Politotdel Tashkent	3 / 3	
1967	Subgroup 1	Dynamo Kirovabad	FK Daugava Riga	FC Kuban Krasnodar	20	59
1967	Subgroup 2	SKA Kyiv	FC Metalurh Zaporizhia	SKA Lviv	20	59
1967	Subgroup 3	FC Shakhter Karaganda	FC Uralmash Sverdlovsk	FC Alga Frunze	19	59
1967	Final	Dynamo Kirovabad	Shakhtar Karaganda	SKA Kyiv	3 / 3	
1968	Subgroup 1	FC Karpaty Lviv	SKA Kyiv	SKA Odessa	21	84
1968	Subgroup 2	Sudnobudivnyk Mykolaiv	FC Metalist Kharkiv	FC Dnipro Dnipropetrovsk	21	84
1968	Subgroup 3	FC Uralmash Sverdlovsk	FC Spartak Ordzhonikidze	FC Dynamo Makhachkala	21	84
1968	Subgroup 4	FC Irtysh Omsk	FC Kuzbass Kemerovo	SKA Khabarovsk	21	84
1968	Final	Uralmash Sverdlovsk	Karpaty Lviv	Irtysh Omsk	4	
1969	Subgroup 1	FC Spartak Ordzhonikidze	FC Dynamo Leningrad	FC Kuban Krasnodar	20	87
1969	Subgroup 2	SKA Khabarovsk	FC Rubin Kazan	FC Metallurg Kuibyshev	12 / 12	87
1969	Subgroup 3	FC Dnipro Dnipropetrovsk	SKA Kyiv	FC Metalist Kharkiv	22	87
1969	Subgroup 4	Žalgiris Vilnius	FC Shakhter Karaganda	FC Lokomotivi Tbilisi	21	87
1969	Final	Spartak Ordzhonikidze	Dnipro Dnipropetrovsk	SKA Khabarovsk	4	

=== Pervaya Gruppa Klassa A (First Group of the Class A) ===
Season	Winner	Runners-up	Third	Teams
1970	Karpaty Lviv	Kairat Alma-Aty	Dnipro Dnipropetrovsk	22

=== Pervaya Liga (First League) ===
Season	Winner		Runners-up	Winner	Teams
1971	Dnipro Dnipropetrovsk		Lokomotiv Moscow	Chornomorets Odessa	22
1972	Pakhtakor Tashkent		Shakhtar Donetsk	FC Chornomorets Odessa	20
1973	Chornomorets Odessa		Nistru Kishenev	Lokomotiv Moscow	20
1974	Lokomotiv Moscow		SKA Rostov/Donu	Dinamo Minsk	20
1975	Krylya Sovetov Kuybyshev		Dinamo Minsk	Torpedo Kutaisi	20
1976	Kairat Almaty		Neftçi Baku	Pakhtakor Tashkent	20
1977	Spartak Moscow		Pakhtakor Tashkent	Tavriya Simferopol	20
1978	Krylya Sovetov Kuybyshev		SKA Rostov/Donu	Dinamo Minsk	20
1979	Karpaty Lviv		Kuban Krasnodar	Pamir Dushanbe	24
1980	Tavriya Simferopol		Dnipro Dnipropetrovsk	Metalist Kharkiv	24
1981	Metalist Kharkiv		Torpedo Kutaisi	Lokomotiv Moscow	24
1982	Žalgiris Vilnius		Nistru Kishenev	Kolos Nikopol	22
1983	Kairat Almaty		SKA Rostov/Donu	Fakel Voronezh	22
1984	Fakel Voronezh		Torpedo Kutaisi	SKA Karpaty Lviv	22
1985	West	FC Daugava Riga	SKA Karpaty Lviv	FC Kotayk	11
1985	East	FC Shinnik Yaroslavl	FC Pamir Dushanbe	FC CSKA Moscow	11
1985	Final	Daugava Rīga	CSKA Moscow	SKA Karpaty Lviv	12 / 10
1986	CSKA Moscow		Guria Lanchkhuti	Daugava Rīga	24
1987	Chornomorets Odessa		Lokomotiv Moscow	Daugava Rīga	22
1988	Pamir Dushanbe		Rotor Volgograd	CSKA Moscow	22
1989	CSKA Moscow		Guria Lanchkhuti	Kairat Alma-Aty	22
1990	Spartak Vladikavkaz		Pakhtakor Tashkent	Metalurh Zaporizhia	20
1991	Rotor Volgograd		Tiligul Tiraspol	Uralmash Yekaterinburg	22

== Winners ==
Club	Winners	Runners-up	3rd Position	Years won
FC Krylia Sovietov Kuibyshev	5			1945, 1956*, 1961*, 1975, 1978
FC Lokomotiv Moscow	3	2	3	1947, 1964, 1974
FC Chernomorets Odessa	3	1	3	1961*, 1973, 1987
FC Dinamo Minsk	2	2	2	1953, 1956*
FC Torpedo Kutaisi	2	2	1	1960*, 1961*
FC Kairat Alma-Ata	2	2	1	1976, 1983
FC Fakel Voronezh	2	1	3	1960*, 1984
FC Ararat Yerevan	2	1	2	1959*, 1965
FC CSKA Moscow	2	1	1	1986, 1989
FC Karpaty Lvov	2	1		1970, 1979
FC Lokomotiv Kharkov	2		1	1948, 1952
FC Admiralteyets Leningrad	2			1957, 1959*
FC Zarya Lugansk	2			1962*, 1966
FC Spartak Ordzhonikidze	2			1969, 1990
FC Zhalgiris Vilnius	1	3	1	1982
SKA Rostov-on-Don	1	3		1958
FC Pakhtakor Tashkent	1	2	2	1972
FC Dnepr Dnepropetrovsk	1	2	1	1971
FC Zimbru Kishinev	1	2		1955*
FC Shakhter Donetsk	1	1	1	1954
Serp i Molot Moscow	1	1		1936
FC Spartak Leningrad	1	1		1937
VVS Moscow	1	1		1946
SKA Sverdlovsk	1	1		1955*
FC Shakhter Karaganda	1	1		1962*
FC Lokomotivi Tbilisi	1	1		1961*
FC Kuban Krasnodar	1	1		1962*
FC Rotor Volgograd	1	1		1991
SC Tavriya Simferopol	1		2	1980
FC Metallist Kharkov	1		2	1981
FC Daugava Riga	1		2	1985
FC Metallurg Zaporozhie	1		2	1960*
FC Uralmash Sverdlovsk	1		2	1968
FC Lokomotiv Vinnitsa	1		1	1959*
FC Pamir Dushanbe	1		1	1988
Dynamo Tiflis	1			1936
FC Krylia Sovietov Moscow	1			1939
FC Krasnaya Zarya Leningrad	1			1940
FC Spartaki Tbilisi	1			1949
FC VMS Moscow	1			1950
FC MVO Moscow	1			1951
FC Shinnik Yaroslavl	1			1963
Dynamo Kirovabad	1			1967
FC Pamir Leninabad	1			1959*
FC Spartak Moscow	1			1977

Republics	Winners	Years won
Russian SFSR	30	1936, 1937, 1939, 1940, 1945, 1946, 1947, 1950, 1951, 1955*, 1956*, 1957, 1958, 1959*, 1960*, 1961*, 1962*, 1963, 1964, 1968, 1969, 1974, 1975, 1977, 1978, 1984, 1986, 1989, 1990, 1991
Ukrainian SSR	15	1948, 1952, 1954, 1959*, 1960*, 1961*, 1962*, 1966, 1970, 1971, 1973, 1979, 1980, 1981, 1987
Georgian SSR	5	1936, 1949, 1960*, 1961*, 1961*
Kazakh SSR	3	1962*, 1976, 1983
Belarusian SSR	2	1953, 1956*
Armenian SSR	2	1959*, 1965
Tajik SSR	2	1959*, 1988
Moldovan SSR	1	1955*
Azerbaijan SSR	1	1967
Uzbek SSR	1	1972
Lithuanian SSR	1	1982
Latvian SSR	1	1985

=== Podium sweep ===
- Russia (1963)
- Ukraine (1980)

=== All-time table (top 20) ===
There were over 260 teams that played in the Soviet First League. In the list with green background are clubs with over 30 seasons in the league.

Team	Republic	Seasons	First season	Last season	Played	Won	Drawn	Lost	Goals for	Goals against	Points^{1}	1st	2nd	3rd
Metallurg Zaporozhie	Ukraine	40	1947	1990	1470	563	406	501	1914	1687	2095	1		2
Shinnik Yaroslavl (Note: doesn't include the record of Torpedo Yaroslavl in 1947 Soviet First League)	Russia	33	1957	1991	1276	493	353	430	1567	1426	1832	1		
Pamir Dushanbe (Note: including the record of Dinamo Stalinabad in 1947–1952)	Tajikistan	36	1947	1987	1329	468	325	536	1621	1851	1729	1		1
Kuban Krasnodar	Russia	31	1949	1991	1116	436	287	393	1395	1287	1595	1	1	
Fakel Voronezh	Russia	26	1954	1991	993	421	280	292	1231	913	1543	2	1	3
Nistru Kishinev	Moldova	32	1947	1991	1154	406	322	426	1318	1416	1540	1	2	
Kuzbass Kemerovo	Russia	30	1948	1990	1086	402	244	440	1311	1397	1450			
Uralmash Sverdlovsk	Russia	30	1945	1991	1003	390	230	383	1316	1266	1400	1		2
Zhalgiris Vilnius	Lithuania	26	1947	1982	924	374	262	288	1179	922	1384	1	3	1
Dnepr Dnepropetrovsk	Ukraine	26	1939	1980	873	378	223	272	1226	1055	1357	1	2	1
Rotor Volgograd	Russia	27	1951	1991	918	370	222	326	1251	1118	1332	1	1	
Tekstilschik Ivanovo	Russia	30	1939	1983	938	347	265	326	1179	1134	1306			
Tavria Simferopol	Ukraine	23	1958	1991	890	343	240	307	1162	1043	1269	1		2
Daugava Riga	Latvia	26	1948	1989	959	328	271	360	1104	1164	1255	1		2
SKA Karpaty Lvov	Ukraine	23	1949	1989	813	344	202	267	1058	918	1234			
Spartak Vladikavkaz	Russia	24	1960	1990	933	340	212	381	1059	1177	1232	2		
Chernomorets Odessa	Ukraine	22	1940	1973	703	343	164	196	1132	771	1193	3	1	3
Torpedo Kutaisi	Georgia	20	1949	1989	746	338	169	239	1037	818	1183	2	2	1
Metallist Kharkov	Ukraine	21	1947	1981	772	316	211	245	913	784	1159	1		2
Zvezda Perm	Russia	26	1945	1979	840	306	221	313	1046	1061	1139			

^{1}Three points for a win. In 1973, a point for a draw was awarded only to a team that won the subsequent penalty shootout. In 1978–1988, the number of draws for which points were awarded was limited.

== Soviet football championship among reserves ==
Season	Champion	Runner-up	3rd Position	Top Goalscorer
1971	Chernomorets Odessa (1)	Metallurg Zaporozhye	Dnepr Dnepropetrovsk	
1972	?	?	?	
1973	?	?	?	
1974	SKA Rostov-na-Donu (1)	Dinamo Minsk	Krylya Sovetov Kuibyshev	
1975	?	?	?	
1976	?	?	?	
1977	?	?	?	
1978	Dinamo Minsk (1)	SKA Rostov-na-Donu	Karpaty Lvov	
1979	Zhalgiris Vilnius (1)	Pamir Dushanbe	Karpaty Lvov	
1980	Kolos Nikopol (1)	SKA Odessa	Metallist Kharkov	
1981	?	?	?	
1982	SKA-Karpaty Lvov (1)	SKA Odessa	Kolos Nikopol	
1983	Iskra Smolensk (1)	Lokomotiv Moscow	SKA Rostov-na-Donu	
1983	Metallurg Zaporozhye (1)	Kairat Alma-Ata	SKA-Karpaty Lvov	
1984	Iskra Smolensk (2)	Zvezda Dzhizak	Nistru Kishinev	
1985	?	?	?	
1986	?	?	?	
1987	?	?	?	
1988	?	?	?	
1989	?	?	?	
1990	?	?	?	
1991	?	?	?	
