= Torpedo Gorky =

Torpedo Gorky may refer to one of the following:

- Torpedo Nizhny Novgorod, an ice hockey club
- FC Torpedo NN Nizhny Novgorod, a soccer club
