= Talanov =

Talanov (Russian: Таланов) is a Russian masculine surname, its feminine counterpart is Talanova. It may refer to

- Dariya Talanova (born 1995), Kyrgyzstani swimmer
- Ivan Talanov (1910–1991), Russian football player
- Khioniya Talanova (1822—1880), Russian stage actress
- Nadezhda Talanova (born 1967), Russian biathlete
- Viktor Talanov (1951–2025), Russian politician
