= 1938 Soviet Top League =

4th season of top-tier football league in Soviet Union

Group A
- Season: 1938
- Dates: 10 May – 14 November
- Champions: FC Spartak Moscow
- Relegated: 12 teams
- Matches: 325
- Goals: 1,175 (3.62 per match)
- Top goalscorer: (20) Makar Honcharenko (Dynamo K.)
- Biggest home win: Metallurg 8–1 Burevestnik (August 28)
- Biggest away win: Burevestnik 1–9 Dynamo L. (May 25)
- Highest scoring: Burevestnik 1–9 Dynamo L. (May 25)

The 1938 Soviet Top League combined all the Groups into one Super League.

The season started on May 10 with the game between FC Torpedo Moscow and FC Spartak Kharkiv in Moscow. The last game was played on November 14 between FC Dynamo Rostov-na-Donu and FC Dynamo Odessa in Rostov-na-Donu. Each team played once with every other. The point system changed as well and stayed this way to the end of the competition in 1991: 2 for win, 1 for draw, and none for loss. This all-National championship format was experimental and was disbanded next year. A half of the League was relegated at the end of the season.

Spartak beside becoming the champion in the League format won the national cup competition, defeating a surprise team Elektrik from Leningrad, that last year was called Krasnaya Zarya.

== Standings ==
Pos	Republic	Team	Pld	W	D	L	GF	GA	GR	Pts
1	Russian SFSR	Spartak Moscow	25	18	3	4	74	19	3.895	39
2	Russian SFSR	CDKA Moscow	25	17	3	5	52	24	2.167	37
3	Russian SFSR	Metallurg Moscow	25	16	5	4	57	29	1.966	37
4	Ukrainian SSR	Dynamo Kiev	25	15	6	4	76	35	2.171	36
5	Russian SFSR	Dynamo Moscow	25	14	4	7	69	34	2.029	32
6	Georgian SSR	Dynamo Tbilisi	25	11	9	5	54	39	1.385	31
7	Russian SFSR	Dynamo Leningrad	25	12	6	7	52	32	1.625	30
8	Russian SFSR	Lokomotiv Moscow	25	12	6	7	44	37	1.189	30
9	Russian SFSR	Torpedo Moscow	25	9	11	5	51	38	1.342	29
10	Ukrainian SSR	Dynamo Odessa	25	9	11	5	39	35	1.114	29
11	Ukrainian SSR	Stakhanovets Stalino	25	11	7	7	56	51	1.098	29
12	Russian SFSR	Traktor Stalingrad	25	12	3	10	53	48	1.104	27
13	Russian SFSR	Elektrik Leningrad	25	8	8	9	42	44	0.955	24
14	Russian SFSR	Stalinets Leningrad (Note: Stalinets Leningrad merged with Zenit in 1939.)	25	7	10	8	38	57	0.667	24
15	Ukrainian SSR	Silmash Kharkiv (R)	25	8	6	11	34	45	0.756	22
16	Russian SFSR	Stalinets Moscow (R)	25	8	5	12	36	44	0.818	21
17	Ukrainian SSR	Lokomotyv Kiev (R)	25	8	5	12	43	64	0.672	21
18	Russian SFSR	Dynamo Rostov-na-Donu (R)	25	7	6	12	39	43	0.907	20
19	Azerbaijan SSR	Temp Baku (R)	25	6	8	11	33	40	0.825	20
20	Russian SFSR	Spartak Leningrad (R)	25	6	8	11	30	39	0.769	20
21	Ukrainian SSR	Spartak Kharkiv (R)	25	5	7	13	43	63	0.683	17
22	Russian SFSR	Zenit Leningrad (R)	25	7	3	15	35	57	0.614	17
23	Russian SFSR	Pishchevik Moscow (R)	25	5	6	14	25	53	0.472	16
24	Georgian SSR	Lokomotiv Tbilisi (R)	25	5	5	15	44	62	0.710	15
25	Russian SFSR	Krylia Sovetov Moscow (R)	25	4	7	14	28	56	0.500	15
26	Russian SFSR	Burevestnik Moscow (R)	25	4	4	17	28	87	0.322	12

Source: rsssf.com
(R) Relegated

== Results ==
Home \ Away	BUR	CDK	DYK	DLE	DYN	DOD	DRD	DTB	ELE	KSM	LOK	LTB	LKY	MTM	PSH	SKH	SPK	SPL	SPA	STS	STL	STM	TBK	TOR	TRA	ZEN
Burevestnik Moscow			0–6	1–9					2–6	2–2	1–2	3–1	3–2		1–1		0–6		0–5	2–3			1–0			
CDKA Moscow	2–0				1–0	2–2		3–0			0–1	2–0				3–0		1–0			6–0	2–1		1–0		2–1
Dynamo Kiev		2–1		0–1			3–0		4–1	4–1			1–1		4–2		3–0	7–0		2–0			6–0		3–3	
Dynamo Leningrad		2–0				1–1	3–2	2–1						3–2	2–2			1–1		7–0	3–4	1–0		0–0	1–2	2–1
Dynamo Moscow	7–1		2–3	3–0					6–2	4–2	4–1	5–2	7–1	1–1			4–0		1–4	2–0			2–2			
Dynamo Odessa	1–0		1–1		3–1			0–0			3–1	2–1				2–0			0–1			2–2	1–1	1–1		1–0
Dynamo Rostov-na-Donu	4–0	5–3			0–1	4–0		1–1				1–0				2–3		0–0			2–2	0–2		0–2		0–0
Dynamo Tbilisi	2–0		2–2		2–2				2–0	5–3	2–0	4–1	4–3	3–2		1–1	7–1		1–6				2–1			
Elektrik Leningrad		1–1		2–1		2–1	0–4							1–3	2–0			4–1		2–3	2–0	0–1		0–3	6–0	1–1
Krylia Sovetov Moscow		0–3		1–2		1–4	1–1		1–1					1–1	0–1			2–1		2–1	0–1			2–2	1–0	0–1
Lokomotiv Moscow			2–2	1–1			2–1		0–1	2–0					2–1		3–3		0–0	4–3			3–1		2–3	
Lokomotiv Tbilisi			3–4	2–1					3–1	3–3	1–1		4–1		2–1		2–2		1–3	3–3			1–3		1–1	
Lokomotyv Kiev		2–5		2–2		0–1	3–1		1–1	1–0	2–3			0–3	4–2			3–2		2–6	1–1			2–3	3–2	
Metallurg Moscow	8–1	0–2	3–2			6–2	1–1				4–2	2–1			1–0			4–2	2–1		2–2		2–1		3–0	
Pishchevik Moscow		0–6			1–1	0–0	2–1	0–5								3–0		2–1			2–2	0–2		2–2	1–0	0–2
Silmash Kharkiv	1–0		0–4	1–2	1–0				2–2	3–0	0–2	5–2	0–1	0–0			2–0		0–2				1–0			
Spartak Kharkiv		2–2		2–1		2–2	2–6		2–2	5–1			1–3	0–1	2–0			0–2		1–4	5–1				0–3	
Spartak Leningrad	6–0				1–2	2–2		1–0			0–0	2–1				1–1			0–1		0–0	3–0		0–3		2–1
Spartak Moscow		1–2	1–1	0–4			7–1		0–0	6–1			5–0		3–0		5–0			5–0			5–1	2–3	5–1	
Stakhanovets Stalino		4–0				1–1	1–0	1–1						1–3	5–2	3–2		2–2			2–2	2–0		1–1	2–2	5–2
Stalinets Leningrad	1–1		2–7		1–2	3–2		2–2			2–1	2–1				1–1			0–4			5–1		1–5		1–1
Stalinets Moscow	1–3		3–2		2–1			0–0		0–1	1–3	4–1	1–1	1–2		2–3	3–2		0–1				2–2			
Temp Baku		0–1		1–0			0–2		2–2	2–2			5–2		3–0		1–1	0–0		1–3	3–0				2–0	
Torpedo Moscow	2–2		5–1		0–3			3–3			0–2	3–5		1–0		2–2	2–2					1–1	1–1			5–2
Traktor Stalingrad	6–2	0–1			3–2	2–4	4–0	2–1								6–2		2–0			1–2	4–0		2–1		4–3
Zenit Leningrad	3–2		1–2		0–6			2–3			1–4	3–2	1–2	0–1		4–3	3–2		0–1			2–6	+:-			

Legend: Blue = home team win; Yellow = draw; Red = away team win.

== Top scorers ==
20 goals

- Makar Goncharenko (Dynamo Kiev)

19 goals

- Grigory Fedotov (CDKA Moscow)
- Aleksandr Ponomarev (Traktor Stalingrad)

18 goals

- Sergei Kapelkin (Metallurg Moscow)
- Aleksei Sokolov (Spartak Moscow)

15 goals

- Pyotr Petrov (Torpedo Moscow)
- Aleksandr Sinyakov (Torpedo Moscow)

14 goals

- Arkadi Alov (Dynamo Leningrad)
- Pyotr Layko (Dynamo Kiev)
- Boris Paichadze (Dinamo Tbilisi)
- Sergei Protsenko (Traktor Stalingrad)

== See also ==
- 1938 Soviet Cup
