= 1936 Soviet Second League =

Soviet football league season

== Spring ==
Pos	Rep	Team	Pld	W	D	L	GF	GA	GD	Pts	Promotion or relegation
1	Russian SFSR	Dynamo Rostov-na-Donu (P)	7	5	1	1	19	12	+7	18	Promoted
2	Azerbaijan SSR	Stroiteli Baku (P)	7	4	1	2	18	10	+8	16	
3	Ukrainian SSR	Dynamo Odessa	7	3	2	2	15	9	+6	15	
4	Russian SFSR	Dynamo Kazan	7	3	2	2	14	15	−1	15	
5	Georgian SSR	Lokomotivi Tbilisi	7	2	3	2	14	11	+3	14	
6	Ukrainian SSR	Spartak Kharkiv	7	1	3	3	8	16	−8	12	
7	Ukrainian SSR	Ugolschiki Staline	7	2	1	4	14	24	−10	12	
8	Ukrainian SSR	Lokomotyv Kyiv (R)	7	1	1	5	7	12	−5	10	Relegated

(P) Promoted; (R) Relegated

== Fall ==
=== Overview ===
This tournament was exact replica of the spring championship by the format of the competition, including the nomination of points.

=== League standings ===
Pos	Republic	Team	Pld	W	D	L	GF	GA	GD	Pts
1	Russian SFSR	Dynamo Kazan (P)	7	5	1	1	18	9	+9	18
2	Ukrainian SSR	Spartak Kharkiv	7	4	2	1	15	11	+4	17
3	Ukrainian SSR	Dynamo Dnipropetrovsk	7	4	0	3	14	14	0	15
4	Ukrainian SSR	Dynamo Odessa	7	3	1	3	9	7	+2	13 (Note: −1 point)
5	Georgian SSR	Lokomotivi Tbilisi	7	3	0	4	14	15	−1	13
6	Ukrainian SSR	Ugolschiki Staline	7	3	0	4	11	14	−3	13
7	Ukrainian SSR	Dynamo Kharkiv	7	1	3	3	6	14	−8	12
8	Russian SFSR	Dynamo Pyatigorsk (R)	7	1	1	5	8	11	−3	7 (Note: −3 points)

(P) Promoted; (R) Relegated

== See also ==
- Soviet Second League
- Soviet First League 1936
- 1936 Soviet Top League
