= FC Silmash Kharkiv =

Ukrainian association football club

FC Silmash Kharkiv was an association football club of Ukrainian SSR and Soviet Union.

== Hellferich Sade Factory ==
The club represented the German-owned engine factory Hellferich Sade (after its owner Max Helfferich, in Russian transliteration "Gelferikh") that existed since 1875 in Kharkiv and produced agricultural equipment. In 1918 the factory was nationalised and in 1922 it was renamed Hammer and Sickle (Russian: Серп и молот). Since the fall of the Soviet Union, the factory remained a state company. In 2005 it was announced bankrupt.

=== Sade FC ===
Originally the club was created in 1910 as Sade FC by British workers of the Hellferich Sade factory.

The club competed predominantly at the Kharkiv Football League until the Bolshevik coup-d'état and completely dominated the league. For two seasons 1915-1916 Sade FC played in the Kharkiv Suburban Football League.

The club played at its own stadiums. According to the Russian newspaper "K Sportu", published by the Moscow Football League, on 1 March 1914 the club played at owned wonderful stadium with seating capacity of 10,000.

- Kharkiv Football League
  - Winners (5): 1912, 1912–13, 1913(f), 1914(f), 1917(f)
  - Third runners-up (1): 1914(s)
- Kharkiv Suburban Football League
  - Third runners-up (1): 1915

== Soviet era ==
In 1919 Sade FC was reformed into FC Serp i Molot Kharkiv.

In 1936 the Sickle and Mallet Factory fielded another football team in the Soviet Group B championship called FC Silmash Kharkiv.

In 1941 the club was temporarily merged with FC Dynamo Kharkiv to form FC Spartak Kharkiv.

There is information that after World War II, FC Silmash Kharkiv was revived in lower league competitions participating sporadically at republican level. In 1951 it played as Traktor Kharkiv since KhTZ Traktor changed its name Torpedo earlier in 1948.

== League history ==
Season	Div.	Pos.	Pl.	W	D	L	GS	GA	P	Domestic Cup	Europe	Notes
Serp i Molot Kharkiv
1936 (f)	2nd	8_{/8}	7	0	1	6	6	24	8			
Silmash Kharkiv
1937	3rd	8_{/10}	9	3	1	5	16	29	16			
1938	1st	15_{/26}	25	8	6	11	34	45	22			
1939	2nd	10_{/23}	22	10	4	8	38	25	24			
1940	2nd	13_{/14}	26	6	5	15	41	53	17			
1941–1945 World War II (no record)
1946	Rep "East"	4_{/10}										
1947–1950 regional (oblast) competitions
Traktor Kharkiv
1951	Rep "2"	8_{/10}										
