= Soviet Second League =

Association football league in the Soviet Union

- Founded: 1971
- Folded: 1991 after 52 seasons
- Country: Soviet Union
- Level on pyramid: Level 3
- Promotion to: Soviet First League
- Relegation to: Soviet Second League B or KFK competitions
- Last champions: Karpaty Lviv; Asmaral Moscow; Okean Nakhodka
- Most championships: 11 clubs (2)

The Soviet Second League (Russian: Чемпионат СССР по футболу (вторая лига), Soviet football championship (Second League)) was the third highest division of Soviet football, below the Soviet First League. The league was formed in 1971 in place of the Class A Second Group of the Soviet football championship just a year after the division was downgraded to the third tier. Previously, the third-tier competition predecessor Class B was liquidated completely. The Second League remained in force until dissolution of the Soviet Union in 1991.

== Overview ==
The Soviet third tier competitions were conducted since the establishment of the Soviet football championship among teams of masters in 1936. At first they were called as the Group V (Cyrillic letter of V) of the Soviet football championship, but was discontinued after the 1937. The experimental edition of the third-tier competition was re-introduced in 1946 as the Third Group of the Soviet football championship. But the consistent competitions really took off in 1963 when the Class B of the Soviet football championship was downgraded to the third tier.

The most titles of the League won was two by 11 different teams out of various now independent republics. The last winners of the League were FC Karpaty Lviv, FC Asmaral Moscow, and FC Okean Nakhodka.

Between 1963 and 1970 football competitions in Class B were split by republican principle at first as tier two, then as tier three, and at the end in 1970 it was downgraded to the auxiliary tier four (or lower tier three). Each territorial Class B competition had multiple number of sub-groups that were known as zones. Winners of each territorial (republican) Class B was granted promotion to Class A Second Group (First League). Also on occasions, there were relegation play-offs to allow rotation for the collective of physical culture (KFK).

- Class B of the Russian SFSR (1959–1970)
- Class B of the Ukrainian SSR (1960–1970)
- Class B of Union republics (1960–1967)
- Class B of Central Asia (1966–1970)
- Class B of the Kazakh SSR (1968–1970)
- Class B of Caucasus (1969)

In 1970–71, the Soviet league system was restructured for lower leagues and Class B competitions were discontinued. Republican competitions were conducted with the Soviet Second League which consisted of multiple groups (zones). There was no explicit designation of zones as they were simply numerated. Initially the league consisted of six groups, but for the next couple of season was increased to seven before reducing back to six again. Normally winners of group were getting promoted to the First League.

In 1980 the league was expanded to 9 groups, winners of which qualified for a mini-tournament that consisted of three groups with three teams. The three winners of that mini-tournament received promotion to the First League. This format remained in place until 1989.

Republican competitions continued to be conducted among collective of physical culture and were considered as amateur.

In 1990 the league again went through another transformation reducing the number of groups from 9 to 3, winners of which would have been promoted to the First League. Due to withdrawal of teams, promotion and relegation was disrupted and the 1991 season became the last.

== Third tier competition names ==
- 1936–1937 Group V (third letter in the Russian alphabet)
  - 1936–1937 Group G
  - 1936–1937 Group D and Group of Cities of the Far East
- 1946–1946 Third Group
- 1963–1969 Class B
- 1970–1970 Second Group (Class A)
  - 1970–1970 Class B
- 1971–1989 Second League
- 1990–1991 Buffer League
  - 1990–1991 Second League B

== Winners ==
=== Group V ===
Season	Winner	Runners-up	Third	Notes
1936 (spring)	FC Dinamo Rostov/Don	Stroiteli Baku	Dynamo Odessa	
1936 (autumn)	Dinamo Kazan	Spartak Kharkiv	Dynamo Dnipropetrovsk	
1937	Dynamo Odessa	Lokomotyv Kyiv	Stakhanovets Staline	

=== Third Group ===
Season	Zone	Winner	Runners-up	Third	Notes
1946	1	Spartak Uzhhorod	Krylya Sovetov Tbilisi		five groups winners and runners-up of which qualified for the two final groups
1946	2	Dinamo Riga	Zenit Kaliningrad		five groups winners and runners-up of which qualified for the two final groups

=== Class B ===
Season	Zone	Winner	Runners-up	Third	Notes
1963	Russia	Volga Kalinin	Dinamo Kirov	Zvezda Serpukhov	three zones
1963	Ukraine	SKA Odessa	Lokomotyv Vinnytsia	Azovstal Zhdanov	three zones
1963	Republics	Lokomotivi Tbilisi	Dinamo Batumi		three zones
1964	Russia	Rostselmash Rostov/Don	Terek Grozny	Tekstilshchik Ivanovo	three zones
1964	Ukraine	Lokomotyv Vinnytsia	SKA Kiev	Polissya Zhytomyr	three zones
1964	Republics	Granitas Klaipėda	Vostok Ust-Kamenogorsk	Politodel Tashkent Oblast	three zones
1965	Russia	Spartak Nalchik	Rubin Kazan	Sokol Saratov	three zones
1965	Ukraine	SKA Lviv	SKA Kiev	Avanhard Zhovti Vody	three zones
1965	Republics	Dynamo Kirovabad	Dynamo Baku	Pamir Leninabad	three zones
1966	Russia	Lokomotiv Kaluga	Spartak Ordzhonikidze	Metallurg Tula	four zones
1966	Ukraine	Avanhard Zhovti Vody	Dynamo Khmelnytskyi	Lokomotyv Kherson	four zones
1966	Central Asia	Pamir Leninabad	Metallurg Chimkent	Dynamo Tselinograd	four zones
1966	Republics	Meshakhte Tkibuli	Polad Sumgayit	Neman Grodno	four zones
1967	Russia	Dinamo Makhachkala	Volga Ulyanovsk	Volgar Astrakhan	four zones
1967	Ukraine	Avtomobilist Zhytomyr	Khimik Severodonetsk	Dnipro Kremenchuk	four zones
1967	Central Asia	Zarafshon Nawoyi	Sverdlovets Tashkent Oblast	Metallurg Temirtau	four zones
1967	Republics	Neman Grodno	Polad Sumgait		four zones
1968	Russia	Mashuk Pyatigorsk	Kalinenets Sverdlovsk	Spartak Belgorod	four zones
1968	Ukraine	Avanhard Ternopil	Bukovyna Chernivtsi	Shakhtar Kadiivka	four zones
1968	Central Asia	Sverdlovets Tashkent Oblast	Ak Altyn Andizhan Oblast	Samarqand	four zones
1968	Kazakhstan	Embek Djezkazghan	ADK Alma‑Ata	Metallurg Temirtau	four zones
1969	Russia	Druzhba Maykop	Saturn Rybinsk	Iskra Smolensk	five zones
1969	Ukraine	Spartak Ivano-Frankivsk	Shakhtar Horlivka	Spartak Sumy	five zones
1969	Central Asia	Tashavtomash Tashkent	Samarkand	Yangiyer	five zones
1969	Kazakhstan	Traktor Pavlodar	Tsementnik Semipalatinsk	Embek Djezkazghan	five zones
1969	Caucasus	Dila Gori	Guria Lanchkhuti	Avtomobilist Yerevan	five zones

=== Second Group (Class A) ===
Season	Zone	Winner	Runners-up	Third	Notes
1970	Ukraine	Metalurh Zaporizhia	Tavriya Simferopol	Avtomobilist Zhytomyr	three zones; top two teams of second and third groups played in final Russian group
1970	Russia	Avtomobilist Nalchik	Spartak Yoshkar‑Ola	Kuzbass Kemerevo	three zones; top two teams of second and third groups played in final Russian group

=== Second League ===
Season	Winner	Runners-up	Notes
1971	Kryvbas Kryvyi Rih	Iskra Smolensk	six groups
1972	Spartak Ivano-Frankivsk	Dinamo Riga	seven groups
1973	Uralmash Sverdlovsk	Tavriya Simferopol; Kuban Krasnodar	winners of seven groups play in final
1974	Alga Frunze	Rubin Kazan; Metalist Kharkiv	six groups
1975	Terek Grozny	Dinamo Riga; Stroitel Asgabat	six groups
1976	Dinamo Leningrad	Kryvbas Kryvyi Rih; Uralmash Sverdlovsk	six groups
1977	Kuban Krasnodar	Žalgiris Vilnius; SCA Odessa	six groups
1978	FC Zvezda Perm	Spartak Nalchik; Metalist Kharkiv	six groups
1979	Iskra Smolensk; Kolos Nikopol; Dinamo Stavropol; Guria Lanchkhuti; Sugdiyona Jizzakh; SKA Khabarovsk	Textilschik Ivanovo; SKA Kyiv; Rotor Volgograd; Lokomotivi Samtredia; Shakhrikhonchi Shakhrikhan; FC Shakhter	six groups, no final, six winners
1980	Spartak Kostroma; Traktor Pavlodar; CSKA Kyiv	Rotor Volgograd; Dynamo Samarqand; Khimik Grodno	nine groups, three final groups
1981	Daugava Riga; Dinamo Kirov; Rotor Volgograd	Kotayk Abovyan; Kryvbas Kryvyi Rih; Textilschik Ivanovo	nine groups, three final groups
1982	Textilschik Ivanovo; Dnepr Mogilev; Kuzbass Kemerevo	Spartak Orjonikidze; Dynamo Samarqand; Shakhter	nine groups, three final groups
1983	Irtysh Omsk; Spartak Orjonikidze; Dinamo Batumi	Metallurg Lipetsk; Znamya Truda Orekhovo-Zuevo; Krylya Sovetov Kuybyshev	nine groups, three final groups
1984	Krylya Sovetov Kuybyshev; Kotayk Abovyan; Dinamo Stavropol	Nyva Vinnytsia; Geolog Tumen; Dynamo Samarqand	nine groups, three final groups
1985	Rostselmash Rostov/Don; Atlantas Klaipėda; Iskra Smolensk	Tavriya Simferopol; FC Zvezda Perm; Meliorator Chimkent	nine groups, three final groups
1986	Krylya Sovetov Kuybyshev; Geolog Tumen; Zoria Voroshilovgrad	Kapaz Kirovabad; Metallurg Lipetsk; Sokhibkor Khalkabad	nine groups, three final groups
1987	Tavriya Simferopol; FC Zvezda Perm; Kuban Krasnodar	Iskra Smolensk; Meliorator Chimkent; Nistru Chisinau	nine groups, three final groups
1988	Nistru Chisinau; Torpedo Kutaisi; Fakel Voronezh	Neftchi Fergona; Tsement Novorossiysk; Bukovyna Chernivtsi	nine groups, three final groups
1989	Lokomotiv Gorkiy; Textilschik Tiraspol; Dinamo Sukhumi	Irtysh Omsk; Volyn Lutsk; Neftchi Fergona	nine groups, three final groups
1990	Bukovyna Chernivtsi; Uralmash Sverdlovsk; Neftchi Fergona	Daugava Riga; Textilschik Kamyshyn; Novbakhor Namangan	three groups
1991	Karpaty Lviv; Asmaral Moscow; Okean Nakhodka	Zorya Luhansk; Krylya Sovetov Samara; Kopetdag Asgabat	three groups

=== All-time table (top 20) ===
There were over 520 teams that played in the third tier competitions.

Team	Republic	Seasons	First season	Last season	Played	Won	Drawn	Lost	Goals for	Goals against	Points^{1}	1st	2nd	3rd
Bukovina Chernovtsy	Ukraine	26	1963	1989	1175	508	318	349	1466	1115	1842			
Polesie Zhitomir	Ukraine	24	1963	1988	1086	455	310	321	1294	986	1675			
Druzhba Maikop	Russia	28	1963	1990	1085	470	243	372	1374	1123	1653			
Tselinnik Tselinograd	Kazakhstan	26	1964	1990	974	476	215	283	1360	968	1643			
Neftyanik Fergana	Uzbekistan	23	1963	1989	908	479	178	251	1506	870	1615			
Metallurg Lipetsk	Russia	24	1963	1990	948	448	242	258	1281	855	1586			
Khimik Dzhambul	Kazakhstan	27	1963	1990	1013	446	242	325	1439	1127	1580			
Krivbass Krivoi Rog	Ukraine	22	1963	1988	1003	428	295	280	1267	967	1579			
Sudostroitel Nikolaev	Ukraine	23	1963	1989	1043	425	295	323	1257	1003	1570			
Zakarpatie Uzhgorod	Ukraine	26	1963	1989	1155	426	291	438	1235	1288	1569			
Niva Vinnitsa	Ukraine	22	1963	1990	1002	427	286	289	1230	885	1567			
Podolie Khmelnitskiy	Ukraine	24	1963	1988	1084	404	286	394	1191	1167	1498			
Mashuk Piatigorsk	Russia	24	1936 (f)	1989	916	431	202	283	1224	953	1495			
Volyn Lutsk	Ukraine	27	1963	1990	1206	386	332	488	1148	1416	1490			
Avangard Rovno	Ukraine	25	1963	1988	1113	388	309	416	1097	1152	1473			
Sokol Saratov	Russia	24	1963	1990	923	421	209	293	1416	1065	1472			
Zenit Izhevsk	Russia	26	1963	1990	972	407	251	314	1279	988	1472			
Spartak Kostroma	Russia	23	1963	1988	891	399	260	232	1225	885	1457			
Meliorator Chimkent	Kazakhstan	24	1963	1990	918	418	202	298	1352	1018	1456			
Kristall Kherson	Ukraine	24	1963	1988	1076	387	289	400	1233	1270	1450			

^{1}Three points for a win. In 1973, a point for a draw was awarded only to a team that won the subsequent penalty shootout. In 1978–1988, the number of draws for which points were awarded was limited.

== See also ==
- Ukrainian Zone - the Ukrainian Republican competitions of the Soviet Second League only, not including the interzonal tournaments.
