= FC Dynamo Odesa =

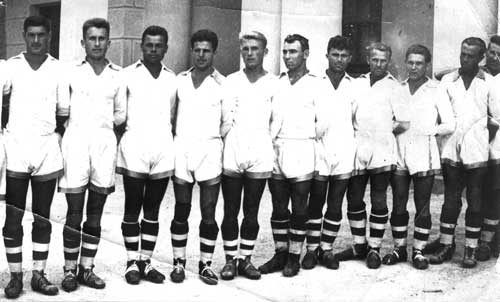
- FC Dynamo Odesa squad in 1936. From left to right: Litvachuk, Sositsky, Kusinsky, Kalashnikov, Khizhnikov, Kravchenko, Heison, M. Gichkin, Orekhov, Straub, Volin
- Founded: 1923
Home colours	Away colours

FC Dynamo Odesa is an amateur association football team from Odesa. It is widely believed that the club along with Pishchevik were predecessors of FC Chornomorets Odesa.

== Overview ==
The club was established in 1926 based on local team Sparta Odesa that was created few years earlier in 1923.

For couple of seasons in 1938–1939 the team was member of the Soviet football championship Group A, the Soviet league's top tier.

In 1940 the Dynamo Odesa football team was dissolved and its players joined Pishchevik sports society that was recently promoted to the Soviet football championship Group B, the Soviet second tier, from the Ukrainian republican competitions.

Sometime after the World War II FC Dynamo Odesa was revived and continued participate in regional competitions of Odesa Oblast.

=== Honours ===
- Group V (predecessor of the Soviet Second League)
  - Winners (1): 1937
- Odesa Oblast Football Championship
  - Winners (2): 1985, 1986
- Odesa City Football Championship
  - Winners (3): 1930, 1934, 1982
  - Runners-up (4): 1932, 1933, 1946, 1949

== League and Cup history ==
=== Soviet Union ===
Season	Div.	Pl.	G	W	D	L	Goals	Pts	Soviet Cup	Ukrainian Cup	Notes
1936 (s)	3	3	7	3	2	2	15–9	15	1/8 finals	Final	
1936 (a)	3	4	7	3	1	3	9–7	13	1/8 finals	Final	-1 pts
1937	3	1	9	7	0	2	23–11	23	1/4 finals	Final	Promoted
1938	1	10	25	9	11	5	39–35	29	1/4 finals	1/2 finals	
1939	1	14	26	7	2	17	25–67	16	1/32 finals	–	Relegated
1940	in Soviet competitions replaced with Pishchevik Odesa										
1944-1980s	Regional competitions										
1990	4	7	30	13	7	10	29-29	33			
1991	4	8	28	11	4	13	40–35	26			

=== Ukraine ===
Season	Div.	Pl.	G	W	D	L	Goals	Pts	Cup	Other	Notes
1992-94	Regional competitions										
1994-95	4	8	32	15	7	10	41–38	52			Promoted
1995-96	3	20	40	3	6	31	12–85	15			Relegated
1996-97	Regional competitions										
1997-98	3	17	32	7	7	18	26–40	28			avoided relegation by merging with SKA-Lotto Odesa
1998-99	3	14	26	1	3	22	5-27	0			(-6); withdrew
1999–2014	Regional competitions										

== See also ==
- FC Chornomorets Odesa
- uk:Чемпіонат Одеси з футболу
