= 1939 Soviet Top League =

5th season of top-tier football league in Soviet Union

Group A
- Season: 1939
- Champions: FC Spartak Moscow
- Relegated: FC Elektrik Leningrad; FC Dynamo Odessa
- Matches: 182
- Goals: 649 (3.57 per match)
- Top goalscorer: (21) Grigory Fedotov (CDKA)
- Biggest home win: Spartak 8–0 Dynamo Od. (July 8)
- Biggest away win: Dynamo Od. 0–6 Dynamo M. (October 12)
- Highest scoring: Dynamo L. 3–7 CDKA (June 15)

1939 Soviet Top League was the fifth season of the Soviet Top League known at that time as Group A.

It started on May 12 with six games of the first round. The main calendar was scheduled to be finished on October 19 with the Moscow derby between Lokomotiv and Dynamo. However, due to numerous protests and postponed games the championship finished on November 30 in Tbilisi with game between Dynamo Tbilisi and Dynamo Odessa. The new champions became Spartak Moscow with two teams being relegated: Elektrik Leningrad and Dynamo Odessa. This was the first full season championship with each team playing over 25 games.

The last year defending champions were Spartak Moscow. There were no newly promoted teams and initially was decided to conduct the championship with 12 teams. However the Soviet sport committee allowed for two Leningrad teams Stalinets and Elektrik to remain in the league.

Spartak once again won the cup competition that started in summer with final played in mid-September. That was the last edition of the cup before World War II.

== Representation by republic ==
- Russian SFSR 10
- Ukrainian SSR 3
- Georgian SSR 1

== Standings ==
Pos	Team	Pld	W	D	L	GF	GA	GD	Pts
1	Spartak Moscow (C)	26	14	9	3	58	23	+35	37
2	Dynamo Tbilisi	26	14	5	7	60	41	+19	33
3	CDKA Moscow	26	14	4	8	68	43	+25	32
4	Traktor Stalingrad	26	13	4	9	50	39	+11	30
5	Lokomotiv Moscow	26	12	6	8	42	39	+3	30
6	Metallurg Moscow	26	12	5	9	53	50	+3	29
7	Dynamo Moscow	26	12	4	10	60	46	+14	28
8	Dynamo Kiev	26	9	8	9	39	44	−5	26
9	Torpedo Moscow	26	8	7	11	51	51	0	23
10	Dynamo Leningrad	26	8	6	12	41	56	−15	22
11	Stalinets Leningrad	26	7	7	12	30	46	−16	21
12	Stakhanovets Stalino	26	5	10	11	40	55	−15	20
13	Elektrik Leningrad (R)	26	6	5	15	32	49	−17	17
14	Dynamo Odessa (R)	26	7	2	17	25	67	−42	16

Source: rsssf.com
(C) Champions; (R) Relegated

== Results ==
Home \ Away	CDK	DYK	DLE	DYN	DOD	DTB	ELE	LOK	MTM	STS	STL	SPA	TOR	TRA
CDKA Moscow		0–2	2–2	6–2	3–2	4–5	6–1	3–0	6–1	2–2	3–1	0–1	2–2	2–0
Dinamo Kiev	1–1		4–5	3–1	2–1	3–2	1–0	2–1	2–2	1–1	0–0	2–2	0–2	0–2
Dinamo Leningrad	3–7	1–1		0–3	3–2	3–2	2–2	1–2	1–0	2–2	1–2	1–3	5–3	2–1
Dinamo Moscow	4–1	2–1	1–3		5–1	3–2	1–1	0–1	2–0	1–2	4–2	1–1	4–1	2–3
Dynamo Odessa	0–1	2–0	1–0	0–6		3–2	0–2	1–4	1–1	2–3	1–0	0–0	2–1	1–3
Dinamo Tbilisi	2–1	2–2	4–1	4–1	1–0		0–1	3–0	3–1	3–2	3–1	0–0	3–0	1–1
Elektrik Leningrad	2–0	1–2	1–0	3–1	6–0	2–5		0–3	1–2	2–2	2–2	1–2	0–0	0–2
Lokomotiv Moscow	1–0	1–2	1–1	1–6	2–0	3–1	2–0		4–3	2–2	0–0	2–2	4–0	1–4
Metallurg Moscow	2–3	4–1	1–2	3–4	6–2	0–3	3–2	2–1		3–2	3–0	3–3	4–3	1–1
Stakhanovets Stalino	0–2	3–1	1–1	1–3	0–2	2–4	2–1	1–2	2–3		1–0	1–1	3–3	2–3
Stalinets Leningrad	1–5	1–1	2–0	1–0	2–0	2–2	3–0	2–2	0–1	1–1		1–4	1–5	3–0
Spartak Moscow	0–1	3–1	2–0	0–0	8–0	3–0	3–1	2–0	0–1	5–0	4–0		2–2	3–1
Torpedo Moscow	4–3	2–1	4–1	2–2	0–1	0–1	4–0	0–1	1–1	2–2	3–1	1–3		4–1
Traktor Stalingrad	2–4	2–3	2–0	3–1	6–0	2–2	1–0	1–1	0–2	3–0	0–1	3–1	3–2	

Legend: Blue = home team win; Yellow = draw; Red = away team win.

== Top scorers ==
21 goals

- Grigory Fedotov (CDKA Moscow)

19 goals

- Boris Paichadze (Dinamo Tbilisi)

18 goals

- Sergei Kapelkin (CDKA Moscow)
- Viktor Semyonov (Spartak Moscow)

16 goals

- Ivan Mitronov (Metallurg Moscow)

15 goals

- Viktor Shylovskyi (Dynamo Kyiv)

14 goals

- Mikhail Semichastny (Dynamo Moscow)

13 goals

- Aleksandr Nazarov (Dynamo Moscow)
- Aleksei Zaytsev (Metallurg Moscow)
- Georgi Zharkov (Torpedo Moscow)
