= FC Elektrosila Leningrad =

Elektrosila Leningrad
- Founded: 1922
- Ground: Lenin Stadium, Leningrad; Red Triangle Stadium, Leningrad

FC Electrosila Leningrad (Russian: Электросила Ленинград) or Krasnaya Zorya (Russian: Красная Заря) was a Soviet association football club from Leningrad, Soviet Union. The club played in the Soviet Top League from its inception to World War II. Until 1930 Krasnaya Zorya played in local competitions of Leningrad city and later in the city championship. In 1940 it lost most of its players when massive changes took place in the Soviet competitions before the 1941 season.

== Team name history ==
- Krasnaya Zaria Leningrad (1922-37)
- Elektrik Leningrad (1938-39)
- Krasnaya Zaria Leningrad (1940-45)
- Elektrosila Leningrad (1946)

== Stadium ==
During its time in the Soviet Top League Elektrosila played its games at the central stadium of the city, the Lenin Stadium. Other times the club played its games at the Red Triangle Stadium.

== League and Cup history ==
Season	Division	Position	Pl.	W	D	L	GS	GA	P	Domestic Cup	Europe	Notes
Krasnaya Zaria Leningrad
1936 (Spring)	1st	7	6	1	1	4	8	21	9			
1936 (Autumn)	1st	5	7	3	0	4	13	18	13			
1937	1st	8	16	4	4	8	17	31	28			
Elektrik Leningrad
1938	1st	13	25	8	8	9	42	44	24			
1939	1st	13	26	6	5	15	32	49	17			Relegated
Krasnaya Zaria Leningrad
1940	2nd	1	26	15	5	6	54	36	35	No competition		merged with Zenit
World War II
Elektrosila Leningrad
1946	2nd	11	24	5	6	13	23	50	16			East subgroup

== Honours ==
- Soviet First League
  - Winners (1): 1940
- Soviet Cup
  - Runners-up (1): 1938
