= Ivan Talanov =

Soviet footballer, coach, and referee

Personal information
- Full name: Ivan Mikhailovich Talanov
- Date of birth: 10 November 1910
- Place of birth: Kanavino, Russia
- Date of death: 11 July 1991 (aged 80)
- Position: Forward

Senior career*
Years	Team	Apps	(Gls)
1937	GOLIFK Leningrad		
1938	FC Stalinets Leningrad	3	(1)
1939–1940	FC Avangard Leningrad		

Managerial career
- 1937–1940: FC Avangard Leningrad
- 1946–1948: FC Zenit Leningrad
- 1954: FShM Leningrad
- 1957–1958: FC Admiralteyets Leningrad
- * Club domestic league appearances and goals

Ivan Mikhailovich Talanov (Russian: Иван Михайлович Таланов; 10 November 1910 – 11 July 1991) was a Soviet Russian football player, coach and a referee.
