= Stroitel Baku =

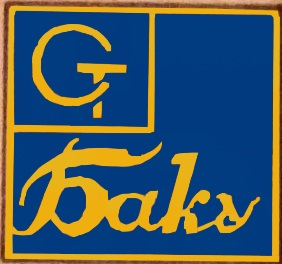
- Full name: Stroitel Baku
- Founded: 1930; 95 years ago
- Dissolved: 1940; 85 years ago
- Ground: Dynamo Stadium
- League: Soviet First League
- 1940: 3rd

Stroitel Baku (Russian: Строитель Баку) (formerly named Temp Baku) was a Soviet association football club from Baku, Azerbaijan SSR. They played in the Soviet Top League for only one season, 1938, before relegation to the Soviet First League. They dissolved two years later at the end of the 1940 season.

== Honours ==
- Soviet First League
  - Runners–up (1): 1936 (autumn)
- Soviet Second League
  - Runners–up (1): 1936 (spring)
- Soviet Cup
  - Quarter-finalist (1): 1939

== See also ==
- İnşaatçı Baku FK
