= FC Serp i Molot Moscow =

Russian football team based in Moscow

The Serp i Molot Moscow sports club (Russian: Футбольный клуб «Серп и Молот» Москва, meaning "Sickle and Hammer") was a Soviet and now Russian sports club in the city of Moscow. The club represents the Moscow Metallurgical Plant Serp i Molot since 1922 initially as the Astakhov Club of Sports (AKS) and the Astakhov district club (Rayony klub imeni Astakhova, RKimA).

The club became better known for its football team that since 1936 participated in the All-Union (Soviet) football league competitions as a team of masters (a term for a professional association football team). Following World War II, the football team competed at amateur level.

Some members of the club were players who later made an impact as notable football coaches and football functionaries. They include Boris Arkadyev, Konstantin Beskov, Valentin Granatkin, Grigoriy Fedotov and many others.

== Name changes ==
- 1923—1924 — AKS
- 1925—1930 — RkimA
- 1936 — Serp i Molot
- 1937—1962 — Metallurg
- 1963-19?? — Serp i Molot
- 2000 — Serp i Molot-SNS
- 2001 — Serp i Molot Tusom
- 2005 — FC Maccabi Moscow was formed on the basis of ex-Serp i Molot
- 2009 — FC Serp i Molot (reborn)

== Football ==
=== Soviet period ===
Along with Stalinets Moscow in 1936, Serp i Molot was admitted to the All-Union football league competitions as better teams of the Moscow Football League. The football team of Serp i Molot was seeded at the second tier (Gruppa B).

In 1936 the season was split in two "halves" spring and fall and between them there was held the 1936 Soviet Cup. The Serp i Molot managed to place 1st during the fall half of the 1936 season in Gruppa B (second) and obtained promotion to the top tier (Gruppa A).

Its debut at the top league as Metallurg, the club made on July 23, 1937 (Friday) in away game win against Dinamo Kiev when in front of 30,000 spectators they beat the Ukrainian team 2:0. Both goals were scored by 32 years old Vadim Potapov.

During the 1938 season, they finished third.

=== Current ===
Currently, they play in the Moscow Amateur League (LFL MRO-Centre).

== Bandy ==
The women's bandy team of the club won the Russian championship in 1989, 1990, 1991, and 1992.
