= FC Spartak Kharkiv =

FC Spartak Kharkiv was a football club from Kharkiv.

== History ==
The club was created in 1922 at the Central Committee of Komsomol of Ukraine (LKSMU). In 1924 former Gelferik-Sade Stadium was renamed as Spartak to the 2nd All-Ukrainian Spartakiade. In 1925 Soviet Union national football team hosted Turkey national football team at Spartak Stadium in Kharkiv and won 7:1.

Along with Dynamo and Traktor – KhTZ, Spartak participated in the very first season of the Soviet Football Championship in 1936 being seeded in Group V (tier 3). They placed only 6 out of 8. The fall portion as the second season of 1936 Spartak finished second. Before the German–Soviet armed clash, Spartak regularly played among the "teams of masters" except for the 1940 season. Admission of Spartak to the "All-Union football competitions" in 1941 was a somewhat of surprise. After the World War II Spartak played mostly at regional or republican level.
