= FC Spartak Leningrad =

Soviet Union football team

FC Spartak Leningrad (Russian: «Спартак» Ленинград) was a Soviet football club from Leningrad existed since 1931 until 1967 (other names - Promkooperatsiya in 1931-34 and Avtomobilist in 1965-67). It played at first level of the Soviet football pyramid (Group A) in 1938 (was relegated) and 1941 (championship abandoned because of the Great Patriotiс War), and at its second level (Group B / Second group / Class B) in 1936-37, 1939–40, 1945–49, 1959-62 (was a Group B winner in 1937), and at its third level (Class B) in 1963-66. In 1950-58 didn't play in USSR championships. Also played in Leningrad championships in 1931-66 (with some breaks).

One of the team's head coaches was Pavel Batyrev (in 1936-38, 1940–41, 1946–48), known as a notable player of early years of Russian / Soviet football and bandy. Among the team's players were noted coaches Oleg Oshenkov and Gadzhi Gadzhiev and noted commentator Vladimir Pereturin.

== See also ==
- BC Spartak Saint Petersburg
