= FC Torpedo NN Nizhny Novgorod =

Russian football team

- Full name: Football Club Torpedo NN Nizhny Novgorod
- Founded: 1932
- Dissolved: 2003
- League: Nizhny Novgorod Oblast League
- 2008: 19th
Home colours	Away colours

FC Torpedo NN Nizhny Novgorod (Russian: «Торпедо НН» (Нижний Новгород)) was a Russian football team from Nizhny Novgorod that played in the Nizhny Novgorod Oblast championship (6th level).

== History ==
It played professionally from 1936 to 1940, 1945 to 1984 and from 1997 to 2001. FC Volga Nizhny Novgorod is another club that can claim the legacy of the team when it was called FC Volga Gorky. In 1948, 1951, 1954 and 1964 it played in the Soviet Top League, where their best result was 13th place in 1954. Their best result during the late 1990s was the 19th place in the Russian First Division in 1999 (the only season it played on that level, the second highest in Russian football).

== Team name history ==
- 1932–1935: FC GAZ Gorky
- 1936: Avtozavod im. Molotova Gorky
- 1937–1961: FC Torpedo Gorky
- 1962: FC Chayka Gorky
- 1963–1984: FC Volga Gorky
- 1997–2002: FC Torpedo-Viktoriya Nizhny Novgorod
- 2003: FC Torpedo NN Nizhny Novgorod
