= 1937 Soviet Cup final =

- Event: 1937 Soviet Cup
Dynamo Moscow	Dinamo Tbilisi
5	2
- Date: 16 July 1937
- Venue: Dynamo Stadium, Moscow
- Referee: Vladimir Strepikheyev (Moscow)
- Attendance: 60,000
- Weather: 18°C, Clear

The 1937 Soviet Cup final was a football match that took place at the Dynamo Stadium, Moscow on July 16, 1937. The match was the second Soviet Cup final and it was contested by Dynamo Moscow and last year finalist Dinamo Tbilisi.

== Road to Final ==
Note: In all results below, the score of the finalist is given first (H: home; A: away).

Dynamo Moscow		Round	Dinamo Tbilisi
Opponent	Result	1937 Soviet Cup	Opponent	Result
Dynamo Minsk	1–4 (A)	Round 1	Zenit Taganrog	1–9 (A)
Krasnoye Znamya Yegoryevsk	0–3 (A)	Round 2	Spartak Yerevan	4–1 (H)
Torpedo Gorkiy	5–2 (H)	Round 3	Neftyanik Baku	3–0 (H)
GOLIFK Leningrad	3–2 (a.e.t.) (H)	Round 4	Lokomotiv Tbilisi	4–0 (H)
Dinamo Kazan	5–1 (H)	Quarter-finals	Dynamo Kiev	2–1 (H)
Lokomotiv Moscow	4–1 (H)	Semi-finals	CDKA Moskva	0–1 (A)

== Previous encounters ==
Both teams were meeting each other for the first time in this competition.

=== Teams at the competition's finals ===
Team	Previous finals appearances (bold indicates winners)
Dynamo Moscow	0 (debut)
Dinamo Tbilisi	1 (1936)

== Match details ==
1937-07-16
18:00 LST

Dynamo Moscow	5 – 2	Dinamo Tbilisi
Smirnov 21' (pen.); Semichastny 22', 35', 72'; Sergey Ilyin 75'	Report	V.Berdzenishvili 19'; M.Berdzenishvili 60' (pen.)

Dynamo Stadium, Moscow
Attendance: 60,000
Referee: Vladimir Strepikheyev (Moscow)

**Dynamo Moscow**	**Dinamo Tbilisi**

Dynamo Moscow:
GK	Yevgeni Fokin
DF	Viktor Teterin
DF	Arkady Chernyshev
MF	Aleksey Lapshyn
MF	Gavriil Kachalin
MF	Aleksandr Ryomin
FW	Mikhail Semichastny (substituted off) 87'
FW	Mikhail Yakushin
FW	Vasily Smirnov
MF	Yevgeni Yeliseyev (substituted off) 85'
FW	Sergey Ilyin (c)
Substitutes:
FW	Aleksey Ponomaryov (substituted in) 85'
Manager:
(Soviet Union) Viktor Dubinin

Dinamo Tbilisi:
GK	Aleksandr Dorokhov
DF	Shota Shavgulidze (c) (substituted off)
DF	Georgiy Chumburidze
MF	Grigoriy Gagua
MF	Mikhail Minayev
MF	Vladimir Dzhorbenadze
FW	Tengiz Gavasheli
MF	Mikhail Berdzenishvili
FW	Boris Paichadze
FW	Vladimir Berdzenishvili
FW	Mikhail Aslamazov
Substitutes:
?	Substituted in
Manager:
(Soviet Union) Aleksey Sokolov

Soviet Cup 1937 Winners
Dynamo Moscow
**First title**

== Game overview ==
At the beginning of the game, both teams attacked mainly with the central trio, since the sides were reliably “covered” by the midfielders. Gradually, the entire five forwards began to join the attack on both sides, and in the 19th minute, the first goal ended up in the goal of the Muscovites. It was scored by V. Berdzenishvili, who finished the attack started by Paichadze and continued by Gavasheli. However, the advantage of the Tbilisi team in the score did not last long. Two minutes later, V. Smirnov converted an 11-meter penalty kick, a minute later M. Semichastny scored the second goal, and when 10 minutes remained until the end of the first half, he scored the third. In the second half of the match, the Tbilisi team scored another goal (M. Berdzenishvili from an 11-meter penalty kick), and the Muscovites (M. Semichastny and S. Ilyin) scored two more, and the Dynamo team from the capital became the winners of the honorary prize.

For the first time, the cup was presented to the winners directly at the stadium immediately after the game, and for the first time, a lap of honor was performed. Although not an individual one, but a collective one. Here is how the newspaper "Krasny Sport" wrote about it:

"The match is over... The melody of the "March of the Footballers" is playing. The reserve goalkeepers of both final teams carry the silk banners of their society. Both teams approach the center of the Northern Stand. From the Southern Stand, the Moscow teams, participants in the USSR Cup, come out: "Spartak", "Torpedo", "Stalinets", "Metallurg", "Burevestnik", "Krasny Konditer", CDKA, Trudkommuna.

The deputy chairman of the All-Union Committee, Comrade B. A. Kalpus, approaches the microphone...

On behalf of the winners of the USSR Cup, S. Ilyin speaks. Comrade Kalpus hands Ilyin the Cup, and to other players the tokens... All the teams march in parade formation past the stands."

== See also ==
- 1937 Soviet Top League
