= 1937 in Soviet football =

Football in the Soviet Union
- Season: 1937

Men's football
- Group A: Dinamo Moscow
- Group B: Spartak Leningrad
- Group V: Dinamo Odessa
- Soviet Cup: Dinamo Moscow

The 1937 Soviet football championship was the 7th seasons of competitive football in the Soviet Union. FC Dynamo Moscow won the championship becoming the winner of Group A for the second time.

CDKA Moscow once again avoided relegation since the format for the next 1938 season changed again.

The defending champions Spartak, while defeating their main rivals Dinamo (2–1, 0–0) this season, had a poor start in the first half losing to Metallurg and Dinamo Kiev and let Dinamo Moscow outperform them.

The football season started with debut of the Soviet film The Goalkeeper of the Lenfilm studios that came out on theater screens in January of 1937.

== Honours ==
Competition	Winner	Runner-up
Group A	Dinamo Moscow (2*)	Spartak Moscow
Group B	Spartak Leningrad	Dinamo Rostov-na-Donu
Group V	Dinamo Odessa	Lokomotiv Kiev
Group G	Traktor Stalingrad	DKA Smolensk
Group D	Spartak Ivanovo	Lokomotiv Dnepropetrovsk
Cities of the East	Dinamo Cheliabinsk	Dinamo Sverdlovsk
Soviet Cup	Dinamo Moscow (1)	Dinamo Tbilisi

Notes = Number in parentheses is the times that club has won that honour. * indicates new record for competition

== Soviet Cup ==
Dinamo Moscow beat Dinamo Tbilisi 5–2 in the Soviet Cup final. Hat-trick was made by Mikhail Semichastny, while two goals for Georgians were scored by Berdzenishvili brothers.

== Soviet Union football championship ==
=== Group A ===
Pos	Republic	Team	Pld	W	D	L	GF	GA	GR	Pts
1	Russian SFSR	Dynamo Moscow	16	8	6	2	37	20	1.850	38
2	Russian SFSR	Spartak Moscow	16	8	5	3	24	16	1.500	37
3	Ukrainian SSR	Dynamo Kiev	16	7	6	3	33	24	1.375	36
4	Georgian SSR	Dynamo Tbilisi	16	7	4	5	30	24	1.250	34
5	Russian SFSR	Metallurg Moscow	16	7	2	7	26	21	1.238	32
6	Russian SFSR	Lokomotiv Moscow	16	5	5	6	18	20	0.900	31
7	Russian SFSR	Dynamo Leningrad	16	2	9	5	21	25	0.840	29
8	Russian SFSR	Krasnaya Zarya Leningrad	16	4	4	8	17	31	0.548	28
9	Russian SFSR	CDKA Moscow	16	3	1	12	18	43	0.419	23

Source: rsssf.com
Rules for classification: Points awarded were 3 for a win, 2 for a draw, 1 for a loss and none for a no appearance. In case of tie on points, there was used goal ratio for tiebreaker for any places beside the first and the last, for which was decided to conduct additional game.

=== Group B ===
Pos	Republic	Team	Pld	W	D	L	GF	GA	GR	Pts
1	Russian SFSR	Spartak Leningrad (P)	12	6	2	4	19	13	1.462	26
2	Russian SFSR	FC Dinamo Rostov-na-Donu (P)	12	6	2	4	19	14	1.357	26
3	Azerbaijan SSR	FC Temp Baku (P)	12	6	1	5	19	14	1.357	25
4	Russian SFSR	Stalinets Leningrad (P)	12	5	3	4	22	18	1.222	25
5	Russian SFSR	FC Stalinets Moscow (P)	12	5	3	4	16	17	0.941	25
6	Russian SFSR	FC Torpedo Moscow (P)	12	4	4	4	16	18	0.889	24
7	Russian SFSR	FC Dynamo Kazan	12	1	3	8	11	28	0.393	17
8	Russian SFSR	CDKA Moscow (Note: CDKA was returned during the season to the Soviet Top League after playing two games in the season. Their results were scratched for this League this season and are not included in the results for the other clubs.)	2	1	1	0	3	2	1.500	5

(P) Promoted

=== Group V ===
Pos	Republic	Team	Pld	W	D	L	GF	GA	GR	Pts
1	Ukrainian SSR	FC Dynamo Odessa	9	7	0	2	23	11	2.091	23
2	Ukrainian SSR	FC Lokomotiv Kiev	9	6	0	3	20	13	1.538	21
3	Ukrainian SSR	FC Stakhanovets Stalino	9	4	4	1	20	13	1.538	21
4	Ukrainian SSR	FC Dynamo Dnepropetrovsk	9	5	1	3	18	15	1.200	20
5	Ukrainian SSR	FC Traktor Kharkov	9	4	1	4	17	12	1.417	18
6	Georgian SSR	FC Lokomotiv Tbilisi	9	4	0	5	27	23	1.174	17
7	Ukrainian SSR	FC Spartak Kharkov	9	4	0	5	15	21	0.714	17
8	Ukrainian SSR	FC Selmash Kharkov	9	3	1	5	16	29	0.552	16
9	Ukrainian SSR	FC Dynamo Kharkov	9	3	0	6	20	21	0.952	15
10	Russian SFSR	FC Dynamo Gorky	9	1	1	7	8	26	0.308	11 (Note: -1 point?)

Source: rsssf.com

=== Group G ===
Pos	Republic	Team	Pld	W	D	L	GF	GA	GR	Pts
1	Russian SFSR	FC Traktor Stalingrad	11	8	2	1	40	14	2.857	29
2	Russian SFSR	DKA Smolensk	11	8	1	2	30	12	2.500	28
3	Russian SFSR	FC Krylya Sovetov Moscow	11	6	3	2	28	19	1.474	26
4	Russian SFSR	FC Burevestnik Moscow	11	6	1	4	33	20	1.650	24
5	Azerbaijan SSR	FC Dinamo Baku	11	5	2	4	24	15	1.600	23
6	Ukrainian SSR	FC Frunze Plant Kostiantynivka	11	6	0	5	23	25	0.920	23
7	Russian SFSR	FC Kirov's Plant Leningrad	11	5	2	4	15	19	0.789	23
8	Uzbek SSR	FC Dinamo Tashkent	11	4	3	4	16	21	0.762	22
9	Ukrainian SSR	FC Stal Dnipropetrovsk	11	3	4	4	20	27	0.741	21
10	Russian SFSR	FC Torpedo Gorky	11	2	2	7	19	34	0.559	16 (Note: The Torpedo Gorky was docked a point as it refused to play against the Tashkent team.)
11	Azerbaijan SSR	PFC Neftchi Baku	11	2	1	8	14	31	0.452	16
12	Armenian SSR	FC Spartak Yerevan	11	0	1	10	6	31	0.194	10 (Note: The Yerevan's Club was docked two points for a failure to play a scheduled game against the Gorky's club and the club from Kostiantynivka.)

=== Group D ===
Pos	Republic	Team	Pld	W	D	L	GF	GA	GR	Pts
1	Russian SFSR	FC Spartak Ivanovo	10	7	1	2	21	12	1.750	25
2	Ukrainian SSR	FC Lokomotyv Dnipropetrovsk	10	5	4	1	22	15	1.467	24
3	Armenian SSR	FC Dinamo Yerevan	10	6	1	3	19	15	1.267	23
4	Russian SFSR	FC Spartak Kalinin	10	5	3	2	14	13	1.077	23
5	Russian SFSR	FC Metallurg Stalingrad	10	5	2	3	20	11	1.818	22
6	Azerbaijan SSR	FC Lokomotiv Baku	10	5	0	5	17	19	0.895	20
7	Russian SFSR	FC Dinamo Voronezh	10	2	4	4	8	10	0.800	18
8	Russian SFSR	FC Dinamo Kirov	10	2	4	4	18	25	0.720	18
9	Byelorussian SSR	FC Dinamo Minsk	10	2	3	5	20	21	0.952	17
10	Ukrainian SSR	FC Sudnobudivnyk Mykolaiv	10	3	2	5	9	14	0.643	17 (Note: The Sudnobudivnyk was docked a point.)
11	Ukrainian SSR	FC Spartak Kyiv	10	1	0	9	12	25	0.480	12

=== Cities of the East ===
Pos	Republic	Team	Pld	W	D	L	GF	GA	GR	Pts
1	Russian SFSR	FC Dynamo Sverdlovsk	6	4	1	1	38	8	4.750	15
2	Russian SFSR	FC Dynamo Cheliabinsk	6	4	1	1	23	6	3.833	15
3	Kazakh SSR	FC Dinamo Alma-Ata	6	3	2	1	15	8	1.875	14
4	Russian SFSR	FC Sudnostroitel Vladivostok	6	2	1	3	15	22	0.682	11
5	Russian SFSR	FC Zolotoprofsoyuz Chita	6	2	0	4	11	24	0.458	10
6	Russian SFSR	SKA Omsk	6	2	0	4	11	37	0.297	10
7	Russian SFSR	FC Lokomotiv Krasnoyarsk	6	0	3	3	4	12	0.333	9
8	Russian SFSR	FC Burevestnik Novosibirsk (Note: Burevestnik Novosibirsk and SKA Chita withdrew.)	0	0	0	0	0	0	—	0
9	Russian SFSR	SKA Chita	0	0	0	0	0	0	—	0

=== Top goalscorers ===
Group A

- Vasily Smirnov (Dinamo Moscow) – 8 goals

Group B

- Viktor Smagin (Stalinets Leningrad) – 7 goals

== Republican level ==
Football competitions of union republics

=== Football championships ===
- Azerbaijan SSR – Lokomotiv Baku
- Armenian SSR – Spartak Yerevan
- Belarusian SSR – Dinamo Minsk (see Football Championship of the Belarusian SSR)
- Georgian SSR – Lokomotiv Tbilisi (reserves)
- Kazakh SSR – Dinamo Alma-Ata
- Kirgiz SSR – Dinamo Frunze
- Russian SFSR – none
- Tajik SSR – Dinamo Stalinabad
- Turkmen SSR – none
- Uzbek SSR – Spartak Tashkent
- Ukrainian SSR – Spartak Dnipropetrovsk (see 1937 Football Championship of the Ukrainian SSR)

=== Football cups ===
- Azerbaijan SSR – Temp Baku
- Armenian SSR – none
- Belarusian SSR – none
- Georgian SSR – none
- Kazakh SSR – Dinamo Karaganda
- Kirgiz SSR – Dinamo Frunze
- Russian SFSR – none
- Tajik SSR – none
- Turkmen SSR – DKA Ashkhabad
- Uzbek SSR – none
- Ukrainian SSR – Dynamo Kyiv (see 1937 Cup of the Ukrainian SSR)
