= 1937 Soviet Top League =

3rd season of top-tier football league in Soviet Union

Group A
- Season: 1937
- Dates: July 23 – October 30
- Champions: Dynamo Moscow; 2nd All-Union league title
- Relegated: none (reorganization)
- Matches: 72
- Goals: 224 (3.11 per match)
- Top goalscorer: Vasili Smirnov; Leonid Rumyantsev; Boris Paichadze; 8 goals
- Biggest home win: Metallurg 5–0 CDKA (August 12)
- Biggest away win: Spartak 0–4 Metallurg (August 28); Krasnaya Zarya 2–6 Dynamo K. (August 28); Dynamo Tb. 0–4 Dynamo M. (September 18); CDKA 1–5 Dynamo M. (October 24)
- Highest scoring: Krasnaya Zarya 2–6 Dynamo K. (August 28); Dynamo Tb. 5–3 Dynamo K. (October 10)

The 1937 Soviet Top League was the third season of the top-tier all-Union league competitions (Gruppa A). The league competition started a week after conculusion of the 1937 Soviet Cup.

Before the start of the season, two sports societies Dynamo and Spartak were awarded the order of Lenin on resolution of the USSR Central Executive Committee of 22 July 1937. Beside the sports societies, many awards were given to individual athletes among which were 12 footballers.

The defending champion for this edition was FC Spartak Moscow. The season started somewhat late on July 23, 1937, with the game in Kyiv where the League newcomer Metallurg surprisingly defeated the local Dynamo 2:0. The conclusion of the season came on October 30, 1937, with the games in Tbilisi and Moscow's Sokolniki. That game on CSKA Stadium became a culminating as the Army team hold the defending champions to a draw that left Spartak without their title. Interesting is the fact that less than a week prior to that Dynamo Moscow was able to defeat CDKA 5:1 setting them three points ahead of Spartak.

== Format ==
Before the start of the football season, the All-Union Committee implemented several changes to rules (Laws of the Game).

- goal kick
- throw-in
- substitutions
- players' discipline

Also, football players of exhibition teams (teams of masters) were given a participant's ticket. The purpose of the innovation was set out in the instructions: "Each footballer participating in the championship receives a "Footballer's Book", which he must present before the game. This will deprive teams of the opportunity to field disqualified players or players on a roster for other teams." No players were allowed to play at any match without the "Footballer's Book".

Unlike last seasons, it was decided to have both season halves combined. Originally the All-Union Committee planned to hold the competition from July 13 to September 30, 1937, in four groups: "A" and "B" with 8 participants in each and "V" and "G" with 10. Teams that placed last would switch with the top teams from lower tier. There was introduced an additional match if teams would finish with equal points for top two and bottom two. Teams were allowed to have from 15 to 25 footballers on their roster.

Later there were added two additional tiers: Group "D" with 11 teams and Group "Goroda Vostoka" (Cities of the East) with 7. Also, number of participants in Group G was increased to 12.

=== Competition calendar ===
The competition calendar, which was composed in spring, had to be rearranged following the Basque team tour of the Soviet Union and the Spartak voyage to Europe. Some rounds were overstretched for several weeks, the last season champions Spartak had to start late, and Dinamo Tbilisi played their whole first half of the season abroad and returned to play its home games only in the second half of the season.

== Teams ==
=== Changes from last season ===
Promoted from 1936 (fall) Gruppa B	Relegated from 1936 (fall) Gruppa A
▲ Serp i Molot Moscow (1st)	▼CDKA Moscow (8th)

After playing two games in the Group B it was decided to return CDKA Moscow back to the Group A. The Group A was extended once again to nine teams with a new team FC Metallurg Moscow joining the group that won the 1936 Group B fall championship as Serp i Molot Moscow. At the end of the season no teams were relegated as the group was planned to be extended for the next season.

=== Reversal of the CDKA Moscow relegation ===
"Resolution of the All-Union Committee for Physical Culture and Sports under the Council of People's Commissars of the USSR

On the revision of the transfer of the CDKA football team of masters from class "A" to class "B"

1. Considering that the CDKA football team is the only football team of masters in the Red Army (RKKA), and also having examined the results of the investigation into the simultaneous triple workload of the CDKA team players during the autumn season of 1936 (Games: a) for the Soviet championship, b) for the RKKA championship and c) for the Moscow city garrison championship), which led to the withdrawal of a number of the strongest players from the team due to traumatic injuries and to unacceptable physical workload of individual players, and, in addition, taking into account that the CDKA team remains among the strongest teams of the Union from year to year, namely: 1. the 1935 Moscow city champion; 2. In the 1936 spring all-Union [Soviet] championship, it took fourth place among the strongest teams of the Union; 3. In the autumn all-Union championship of the same year, it lagged behind the seven strongest teams of the Union by only half a point; (Note: possibly a confusion with the chess points calculation system) 4. In the 1937 Soviet Cup, it won a place in the top four of the Soviet Union (Note: reached semifinals) (having conceded only one goal in the last three minutes of the game against the finalist, Dynamo (Tbilisi); 5. It has a victory in calendar matches against the 1936 Soviet champion (the Spartak Moscow team); 6. In the same season, it has a 4:1 victory in a friendly match against the Dynamo Moscow team, which won the 1937 Soviet Cup.

The All-Union Committee for Physical Culture and Sports under the Council of People's Commissars of the USSR decrees:

1. To transfer the CDKA football team of masters from class "B" to class "A".

2. To rearrange the calendar of the class "A" draw with the inclusion of the CDKA team in it.

3. The games played by the CDKA team for the 1937 Soviet championship in group "B" (Note: In the same document tiers are interchangeably named either "classes" or "groups".) with the Spartak (Leningrad) and "Stalinets" (Leningrad), considered friendly.

Acting Chairman of the All-Union Committee for Physical Culture and Sports under the Council of People's Commissars of the USSR Elena Knopova.

August 4, 1937"

=== Spartak Moscow ===
Spartak Moscow was the base team for the Soviet Union national football team at the 1937 Workers' Summer Olympiad and returned to the Soviet Union after the start of the competition.

Upon arrival of Spartak, the football team administration was accused of "the imposition of bourgeois morals in the Spartak society." On September 3, 1937, Nikolai Starostin, who was heading the football section of the All-Union Committee of Sports and Physical Culture and one of the founders of Spartak sports society, was fired.

=== Name change ===
- Serp i Molot → Metallurg

== Managers ==
Club	Head coach
Spartak Moscow	Konstantin Kvashnin
Dynamo Moscow	Viktor Dubinin
Dynamo Tbilisi	Aleksey Sokolov
Lokomotiv Moscow	(France) Jules Limbeck
Krasnaya Zaria Leningrad	Mikhail Okun
Dynamo Kyiv	Moisey Tovarovsky
Dynamo Leningrad	Mikhail Butusov
Metallurg Moscow	Boris Arkadyev
CDKA Moscow	Mikhail Rushchinsky

=== Managerial changes ===
Team	Outgoing head coach	Manner of departure	Date of vacancy	Table	Incoming head coach	Date of appointment
Dynamo Tbilisi	(France) Jules Limbeck	Resigned	March 1937	Pre-season	Aleksey Sokolov	
Lokomotiv Moscow	Aleksei Stolyarov			Pre-season	(France) Jules Limbeck	April 1937
Metallurg Moscow	Konstantin Blinkov			Pre-season	Boris Arkadyev	
Dynamo Moscow	Konstantin Kvashnin			Pre-season	Viktor Dubinin	
Spartak Moscow	Mikhail Kozlov	Elected a president of the Soviet Football Section		Pre-season	Konstantin Kvashnin	
Lokomotiv Moscow	(France) Jules Limbeck	undisclosed	August 8, 1937	3rd		

== Standings ==
Pos	Republic	Team	Pld	W	D	L	GF	GA	GR	Pts	Promotion or qualification
1	Russian SFSR	Dynamo Moscow (C)	16	8	6	2	37	20	1.850	38	Champions of the Soviet Union
2	Russian SFSR	Spartak Moscow	16	8	5	3	24	16	1.500	37	Runners-up prize recipients
3	Ukrainian SSR	Dynamo Kiev	16	7	6	3	33	24	1.375	36	Runners-up prize recipients
4	Georgian SSR	Dynamo Tbilisi	16	7	4	5	30	24	1.250	34	
5	Russian SFSR	Metallurg Moscow	16	7	2	7	26	21	1.238	32	
6	Russian SFSR	Lokomotiv Moscow	16	5	5	6	18	20	0.900	31	
7	Russian SFSR	Dynamo Leningrad	16	2	9	5	21	25	0.840	29	
8	Russian SFSR	Krasnaya Zarya Leningrad	16	4	4	8	17	31	0.548	28	
9	Russian SFSR	CDKA Moscow	16	3	1	12	18	43	0.419	23	Relegation cancelled (Note: Resolution of the All-Union Committee of Physical Culture and Sports under the Soviet Sovnarkom of April 11, 1938)

Source: rsssf.com
Rules for classification: Points awarded were 3 for a win, 2 for a draw, 1 for a loss and none for a no appearance. In case of tie on points, there was used goal ratio for tiebreaker for any places beside the first and the last, for which was decided to conduct additional game.
(C) Champions

== Results ==
Home \ Away	CDK	DYK	DLE	DYN	DTB	KZL	LOK	MTM	SPA
CDKA Moscow		2–4	0–3	1–5	2–5	5–1	0–2	0–3	2–2
Dynamo Kiev	1–0		1–1	2–2	2–2	4–1	1–1	0–2	1–1
Dynamo Leningrad	2–3	0–1		3–3	0–2	2–2	0–0	1–1	0–0
Dynamo Moscow	3–1	2–1	2–2		3–3	1–1	1–2	2–1	0–1
Dynamo Tbilisi	1–0	5–3	1–3	0–4		3–0	0–0	4–0	1–0
Krasnaya Zarya Leningrad	3–0	2–6	0–0	0–3	1–1		0–1	3–1	0–2
Lokomotiv Moscow	1–2	2–2	1–0	2–3	3–2	0–2		0–0	1–2
Metallurg Moscow	5–0	0–2	5–1	0–3	1–0	0–1	2–1		1–3
Spartak Moscow	2–0	1–2	3–3	0–0	2–0	2–0	3–1	0–4	

Source: football.lg.ua (in Russian)
Legend: Blue = home team win; Yellow = draw; Red = away team win.

== All matches results by date ==
- Source: football.lg.ua (in Russian)

Date	Round	Home team	Result	Visiting team	Stadium
23.07.1937	1	Dinamo K.	0:2 (0:1)	Metallurg	Dinamo
24.07.1937	1	Dinamo L.	3:3 (2:0)	Dinamo M.	imeni Lenina
29.07.1937	8	Dinamo K.	1:1 (0:0)	Lokomotiv	Dinamo
30.07.1937	8	Metallurg	5:1 (3:1)	Dinamo L.	Dinamo
05.08.1937	2	Lokomotiv	2:3 (1:1)	Dinamo M.	Lokomotiv
05.08.1937	2	Krasnaya Zaria	3:1 (3:0)	Metallurg	imeni Lenina
06.08.1937	9	Dinamo L.	0:1 (0:0)	Dinamo K.	imeni Lenina
11.08.1937	3	Dinamo L.	0:0	Lokomotiv	imeni Lenina
11.08.1937	3	Dinamo M.	1:1 (0:0)	Krasnaya Zaria	Dinamo
12.08.1937	3	Dinamo K.	2:2 (1:0)	Dinamo Tb.	Dinamo
12.08.1937	3	Metallurg	5:0 (0:0)	CDKA	Dinamo
15.08.1937	2	CDKA	2:4 (0:1)	Dinamo K.	Dinamo
17.08.1937	4	Spartak	1:2 (0:0)	Dinamo K.	Dinamo
18.08.1937	4	Dinamo M.	3:3 (1:2)	Dinamo Tb.	Dinamo
19.08.1937	4	Dinamo L.	2:2 (1:2)	Krasnaya Zaria	imeni Lenina
19.08.1937	9	Lokomotiv	1:2 (1:0)	Metallurg	Lokomotiv
20.08.1937	2	Spartak	2:0 (1:0)	Dinamo Tb.	Lokomotiv
21.08.1937	5	CDKA	5:1 (3:0)	Krasnaya Zaria	Lokomotiv
23.08.1937	5	Spartak	3:3 (3:2)	Dinamo L.	Lokomotiv
24.08.1937	5	Dinamo M.	2:1 (0:0)	Dinamo K.	Dinamo
24.08.1937	6	Krasnaya Zaria	0:1 (0:0)	Lokomotiv	imeni Lenina
25.08.1937	5	Metallurg	1:0 (1:0)	Dinamo Tb.	Dinamo
27.08.1937	6	Dinamo M.	3:1 (3:1)	CDKA	Dinamo
28.08.1937	6	Spartak	0:4 (0:1)	Metallurg	Dinamo
30.08.1937	6	Dinamo L.	0:2 (0:1)	Dinamo Tb.	imeni Lenina
30.08.1937	7	Dinamo K.	4:1 (1:1)	Krasnaya Zaria	Dinamo
30.08.1937	7	Dinamo M.	2:1 (1:1)	Metallurg	Dinamo
31.08.1937	7	Spartak	3:1 (3:0)	Lokomotiv	Dinamo
02.09.1937	11	CDKA	0:3 (0:1)	Metallurg	Dinamo
03.09.1937	8	Krasnaya Zaria	1:1 (1:1)	Dinamo Tb.	imeni Lenina
03.09.1937	8	Dinamo M.	0:1 (0:1)	Spartak	Dinamo
04.09.1937	7	CDKA	0:3 (0:1)	Dinamo L.	Dinamo
05.09.1937	10	Metallurg	0:2 (0:1)	Dinamo K.	Dinamo
06.09.1937	9	Krasnaya Zaria	0:2 (0:2)	Spartak	imeni Lenina
07.09.1937	1	Lokomotiv	3:2 (1:1)	Dinamo Tb.	Lokomotiv
07.09.1937	10	Dinamo M.	2:2 (2:2)	Dinamo L.	Dinamo
09.09.1937	9	CDKA	2:5 (1:4)	Dinamo Tb.	Dinamo
10.09.1937	11	Krasnaya Zaria	2:6 (0:3)	Dinamo K.	imeni Lenina
11.09.1937	11	Spartak	0:0	Dinamo M.	Dinamo
12.09.1937	4	Lokomotiv	1:2 (1:1)	CDKA	Avanhard (Kramatorsk)
12.09.1937	12	Dinamo L.	1:1 (0:1)	Metallurg	imeni Lenina
15.09.1937	12	Lokomotiv	2:2 (2:1)	Dinamo K.	Lokomotiv
15.09.1937	18	Spartak	2:0 (0:0)	Krasnaya Zaria	Dinamo
18.09.1937	13	Krasnaya Zaria	0:0	Dinamo L.	imeni Lenina
18.09.1937	13	Dinamo Tb.	0:4 (0:2)	Dinamo M.	Dinamo imeni Beria
18.09.1937	18	Lokomotiv	0:0	Metallurg	Lokomotiv
21.09.1937	1	Spartak	2:0 (2:0)	CDKA	Dinamo
23.09.1937	16	Lokomotiv	0:2 (0:2)	Krasnaya Zaria	Lokomotiv
24.09.1937	14	Dinamo K.	2:2 (0:0)	Dinamo M.	Dinamo imeni Yezhova
24.09.1937	14	Dinamo L.	0:0	Spartak	imeni Lenina
24.09.1937	14	Dinamo Tb.	4:0 (1:0)	Metallurg	Dinamo imeni Beria
26.09.1937	16	Dinamo L.	2:3 (0:1)	CDKA	imeni Lenina
29.09.1937	15	Metallurg	0:1 (0:0)	Krasnaya Zaria	Dinamo
30.09.1937	15	Dinamo K.	1:1 (0:1)	Dinamo L.	Dinamo imeni Yezhova
30.09.1937	15	Dinamo M.	1:2 (1:2)	Lokomotiv	Dinamo
30.09.1937	15	Dinamo Tb.	1:0 (0:0)	Spartak	Dinamo imeni Beria
01.10.1937	14	Krasnaya Zaria	3:0 (2:0)	CDKA	imeni Lenina
04.10.1937	17	Dinamo K.	1:0 (0:0)	CDKA	Dinamo imeni Yezhova
05.10.1937	11	Lokomotiv	1:0 (0:0)	Dinamo L.	Lokomotiv
06.10.1937	12	Krasnaya Zaria	0:3 (0:0)	Dinamo M.	imeni Lenina
06.10.1937	16	Metallurg	1:3 (1:1)	Spartak	Dinamo
08.10.1937	13	CDKA	0:2 (0:1)	Lokomotiv	Lokomotiv
10.10.1937	16	Dinamo Tb.	5:3 (1:2)	Dinamo K.	Dinamo imeni Beria
11.10.1937	17	Lokomotiv	1:2 (0:0)	Spartak	Lokomotiv
12.10.1937	17	Metallurg	0:3 (0:2)	Dinamo M.	Dinamo
12.10.1937	18	Dinamo Tb.	1:3 (0:2)	Dinamo L.	Dinamo imeni Beria
18.10.1937	12	Dinamo Tb.	1:0 (0:0)	CDKA	Dinamo imeni Beria
18.10.1937	13	Dinamo K.	1:1 (1:0)	Spartak	Dinamo imeni Yezhova
24.10.1937	17	Dinamo Tb.	3:0 (2:0)	Krasnaya Zaria	Dinamo imeni Beria
24.10.1937	18	CDKA	1:5 (1:1)	Dinamo M.	Dinamo
30.10.1937	10	CDKA	2:2 (1:0)	Spartak	Dinamo
30.10.1937	10	Dinamo Tb.	0:0	Lokomotiv	Dinamo imeni Beria

== Top scorers ==
Rank	Player	Club	Goals
1	Boris Paichadze	Dynamo Tbilisi	8
1	Leonid Rumyantsev	Spartak Moscow	8
1	Vasily Pavlovich Smirnov	Dynamo Moscow	8
4	Pavel Komarov	Dynamo Kyiv	7
4	Mikhail Semichastny	Dynamo Moscow	7
6	Gayk Andriasov	Lokomotiv Moscow	6
6	Aleksei Ponomaryov	Dynamo Moscow	6
6	Mikhail Yakushin	Dynamo Moscow	6
6	Nikolai Yartsev	Krasnaya Zarya Leningrad	6
10	Pyotr Bykov	Dynamo Leningrad	5
10	Grigory Fedotov	Metallurg Moscow	5
10	Mikhail Kireyev	CSKA Moscow	5
10	Ivan Kuzmenko	Dynamo Kyiv	5
10	Vadim Potapov	Metallurg Moscow	5
10	Ivan Smirnov	Krasnaya Zarya Leningrad	5

== Medal squads ==
(league appearances and goals listed in brackets)

1. FC Dynamo Moscow

Goalkeepers: Yevgeny Fokin (15 / -19), Aleksandr Kvasnikov (1 / -1).
Defenders: Lev Korchebokov (13), Viktor Teterin (9), Aleksandr Myshlyayev (7).
Midfielders: Yevgeny Yeliseyev (16), Arkady Chernyshev (15 / 1), Aleksey Lapshin (12), Gavriil Kachalin (11), Pavel Korotkov (5), Aleksandr Ryomin (1).
Forwards: Mikhail Yakushin (16 / 6), Sergei Ilyin (16 / 4), Vasily Smirnov (14 / 8), Aleksey Ponomaryov (13 /6), Mikhail Semichastny (11 / 7), Nikolay Belousov (3 / 1), Ivan Shcherbakov (2 / 2), Georgy Dyomin (1).

One own goal(s) scored by Mikhail Denisov (FC Dynamo Leningrad), Iosif Lifshyts (FC Dynamo Kyiv)

Manager: Viktor Dubinin.

Transferred out during the season: .

2. FC Spartak Moscow

Goalkeepers: Anatoly Akimov (13 / -10), Ivan Ryzhov (3 / -6).
Defenders: Viktor Sokolov (15), Stanislav Leuta (10), Aleksandr Starostin (7), Sergey Plonsky (2).
Midfielders: Andrey Starostin (16 / 2), Sergey Artemyev (13), Pyotr Starostin (8), Nikolai Palyska (8), Grigory Tuchkov (8).
Forwards: Leonid Rumyantsev (16 / 8), Vladimir Stepanov (15 / 4), Nikolay Zhigalin (15 / 3), Boris Stepanov (12 / 2), Georgy Glazkov (7 / 2), Viktor Semyonov (7), Aleksandr Kasimov (6 / 1), Nikolay Gulyayev (3), Nikolay Tarasov (2 / 1), Sergey Udaleyev (1 / 1).

Manager: Konstantin Kvashnin.

Transferred out during the season: .

3. FC Dynamo Kyiv

Goalkeepers: Anton Idzkovsky (13 / -20), Mykola Trusevych (3 / -4).
Defenders: Mykola Makhynya (16 / 3), Oleksiy Klymenko (15), Vasyl Pravovierov (10), Georgiy Timofeyev (1).
Midfielders: Ivan Kuzmenko (16 / 5), Volodymyr Greber (16 / 3), Iosif Livshyts (14 / 1).
Forwards: Pavlo Komarov (16 / 7), Petro Layko (15 / 4), Makar Honcharenko (14 / 3), Kostiantyn Kalach (10), Konstantin Shchegotsky (9 / 3), Viktor Shylovsky (9 / 3), Mykola Korotkykh (9 / 1), Fedir Tyutchev (2).

Manager: Moisey Tovarovsky.

Transferred out during the season: .

Group A 1937 winners

Second title

== Season's notable situations ==
- As the previous the season was filled with violence on the field. According to the Russian sports historian Aksel Vartanyan on July 23, 1937, Dynamo Moscow visited another Dynamo in Leningrad. In several Leningrad newspapers the game was dubbed as the "Battle of the Neva". During the match the leading footballer of Leningrad team Pyotr Dementyev was hospitalized, while his "offender" Teterin was convoyed from Moscow by the Leningrad Oblast NKVD chief to apologize.
- During the Tbilisi match between Dinamo Tbilisi and Dynamo Kyiv, it was discovered that players of Dynamo Kyiv forgot their "Footballer's Books" in Kyiv and were supposed to be awarded administrative loss. The referee of the game Vladimir Strepikheyev took upon himself and encouragement from Boris Paichadze to hold the match, nonetheless. In the game report protocol Vladimir Strepikheyev noted that personally knowing all players of Dynamo Kyiv he confirmed that all players in the submitted report are correctly noted.
- Following the match of Dinamo Tbilisi vs Dynamo Kyiv, in two days Vladimir Strepikheyev served one more game in Tbilisi against Dynamo Leningrad before he returned to Moscow. Upon arrival to Moscow, Strepikheyev who refereed the 1937 Soviet Cup Final was arrested and soon executed at age 34.
- Interesting situation occurred with two rounds to go before the finish when Dynamo Kyiv was ahead with 33 points and the Moscow teams trailing right behind with Dynamo 30 and Spartak 30. Following the loss to Dinamo Tbilisi, Kyiv still had some possibility to keep their lead if Dynamo Moscow would lose to Metallurg and Dynamo Kyiv overpower Spartak.
- Near the end of the season on October 12, 1937, a big scandal erupted following the match between Muscovite Dynamo and Metallurg which ended in the 3:0 win for Dynamo. The scandal also influenced the situation with refereeing in the competition as the blame for the Dynamo vs Metallurg match was placed on the referee of the match who has accumulated several bad reviews from previous games. During the match the referee canceled two goals that Metallurg scored in the beginning (at the 7th minute) and instead by the end of the first half Dynamo scored twice going for break with a two-goal lead. Following the match many leading Muscovite newspapers were demanding for the match to be replayed. And, while the central committee seemed to be ignoring the situation, on October 16, the local Moscow Committee of Physical Culture and Sport held discussion which was raised by the Red Sport newspaper about the match where some participants insisted on disqualification of the referee and replay of the match. On October 20, in the Soviet central newspaper "Pravda" appeared an article "About sports referees" (О спортивных судьях) where the author of the article was very critical not only about the referee of Dynamo-Metallurg match, but also number of other referees accusing them in corruption. About the same time several Leningrad newspapers also published articles about corruption in the sports referee community. The campaign against referees did not result in replay of the Dynamo-Metallurg match, but the All-Union Committee dissolved the Referee Collegium that supervised all referees, and many referees were disqualified and fired. Later after the fall of the Soviet Union, in 1999 a sports historian Yuriy Lukosyak after studying some materials in the FSB Archives in Saint Petersburg published an article where he mentioned a "depesha" (type of a secret message) for the Leningrad NKVD of March 7, 1938, where several former referees were accused in planning of terrorist actions against the government officials including Stalin, Molotov, Kaganovich.

== See also ==
- 1937 Soviet Cup
- 1937 Group B (Soviet football championship)
- 1937 Group V (Soviet football championship)
- 1937 Group G (Soviet football championship)
- 1937 groups D and cities of Far East
