= 1937 FC Traktor Stalingrad season =

Traktor Stalingrad
1937 season
- Manager: A. Sitnikov
- Stadium: Traktor, Stalingrad
- Group IV: 1st
- Soviet Cup: Round of 64 vs Spartak Moscow
- Top goalscorer: Aleksandr Ponomarev (9); Georgi Shlyapin (9)
Home colours	Away colours

The 1937 Traktor Stalingrad season was the 2nd season in USSR championships.

== Squad ==
Note: Flags indicate national team as defined under FIFA eligibility rules; some limited exceptions apply. Players may hold more than one non-FIFA nationality.

No.	Pos.	Nation	Player
—	GK	URS	Anatoli Kopylov
—	GK	URS	Arkadi Usov (captain)
—	DF	URS	Lev Kabov
—	DF	URS	Fedor Klochkov
—	DF	URS	Ivan Tyazhlov
—	MF	URS	Georgi Ivanov
—	MF	URS	Sergei Kolesnikov
—	MF	URS	Ivan Pichugin

No.	Pos.	Nation	Player
—	MF	URS	Nikolai Pokrovski
—	FW	URS	Aleksandr Voevodin
—	FW	URS	Vasili Inzhevatkin
—	FW	URS	Valentin Liventsev
—	FW	URS	Aleksandr Ponomarev
—	FW	URS	Vasili Provornov
—	FW	URS	Boris Terentyev
—	FW	URS	Georgi Shlyapin

== Transfers ==
In: Note: Flags indicate national team as defined under FIFA eligibility rules; some limited exceptions apply. Players may hold more than one non-FIFA nationality.

No.	Pos.	Nation	Player
—	FW	URS	Aleksandr Ponomarev (from (Soviet Union) Spartak Kharkiv)
—	MF	URS	Ivan Pichugin
—	FW	URS	Vasili Inzhevatkin
—	FW	URS	Valentin Liventsev (from (Soviet Union) Spartak Moscow)
—	FW	URS	Boris Terentyev (from (Soviet Union) Stakhanovets Stalino)
—	FW	URS	Georgi Shlyapin (from (Soviet Union) Dynamo Stalingrad)

Out: Note: Flags indicate national team as defined under FIFA eligibility rules; some limited exceptions apply. Players may hold more than one non-FIFA nationality.

No.	Pos.	Nation	Player
—	DF	URS	S. Izmailov
—	MF	URS	Vladimir Kharchenko
—	FW	URS	Konstantin Vavilov (to (Soviet Union) Lokomotiv Moscow)
—	FW	URS	Valentin Pozdnyshev
—	FW	URS	Aleksandr Sapronov

== Competitions ==
=== Friendlies ===
22 April 1937	Traktor Stalingrad	1 – 1	Traktor Factory Chelyabinsk	Stalingrad
				Stadium: Traktor; Attendance: 2,000

26 May 1937	Traktor Stalingrad	4 – 3	Torpedo Moscow	Stalingrad
				Stadium: Traktor

18 June 1937	Traktor Stalingrad	3 – 1	Spartak Kuybyshev	Stalingrad
				Stadium: Traktor

26 June 1937	Traktor Stalingrad	2 – 0	Spartak Moscow (reserve)	Stalingrad
	1:0 Aleksandr Ponomarev; 2:0 Nikolai Pokrovski 24'			Stadium: Traktor; Attendance: 10,000; Referee: V.Lapshin (Moscow)

30 September 1937	Traktor Stalingrad	? – ?	Team from Novocherkassk

12 October 1937	Traktor Stalingrad	5 – 1	Team of NKMD

=== Soviet Cup ===
24 May 1937 Round of 128	Traktor Stalingrad	9 – 1	Dynamo Saratov	Stalingrad
	1:0 Ponomarev 6'; 8:0 Shlyapin 80'		9:1 ? 87'	Stadium: Traktor; Attendance: 5,000; Referee: V.Chepurov (Stalingrad)

31 May 1937 Round of 64	Spartak Moscow	3 – 2 (a.e.t.)	Traktor Stalingrad	Moscow
	1:1 Semenov 50'; 2:2 V.Stepanov 85'; 3:2 Glazkov 131'		0:1 Ponomarev 23'; 1:2 Shlyapin 58'	Stadium: Stalinets; Attendance: 5,000; Referee: S.Khavchin (Kyiv)

=== USSR Championship. Group IV ===
18 July 1937 1	Traktor Stalingrad	4 – 0	Neftyanik Baku	Stalingrad
	1:0 Inzhevatkin 17'; 2:0 Shlyapin 25'; 3:0 Terentyev; 4:0 Terentyev			Stadium: Traktor; Attendance: 10,000

24 July 1937 2	Traktor Stalingrad	5 – 1	Stal Dnipropetrovsk	Stalingrad
	Liventsev; Ponomarev; Provornov; Shlyapin; Terentyev		Kletskin	Stadium: Traktor; Referee: V.Lapshin (Moscow)

30 July 1937 3	Traktor Stalingrad	3 – 0	Dinamo Baku	Stalingrad
	1:0 Shlyapin 4'; 2:0 Liventsev 10'; 3:0 Shlyapin 79'			Stadium: Traktor; Referee: V.Butusov (Leningrad)

7 August 1937 4	Traktor Stalingrad	3 – 0	Burevestnik Moscow	Stalingrad
	1:1 Ponomarev; 2:1 Liventsev 37'; 3:1 Shlyapin		0:1 Afonin	Stadium: Traktor; Referee: Bystrov

12 August 1937 5	Stal Kostiantynivka	2 – 6	Traktor Stalingrad	Kostiantynivka
	1:2 Lomov; 2:4 Yakovlev		0:1 Provornov; 0:2 Provornov; 1:3 Ponomarev; 1:4 Ponomarev; 2:5 Liventsev; 2:6 Terentyev	Stadium: im. Frunze; Referee: A.Ikonnikov (Gorky)

18 August 1937 6	Spartak Yerevan	1 – 4	Traktor Stalingrad	Yerevan
	1:0 Akopyan 26'		1:1 Shlyapin 27'; 1:2 Terentyev 32'; 1:3 Ponomarev; 1:4 Provornov	Stadium: Dinamo; Referee: Mikhailov

26 August 1937 7	Dinamo Tashkent	1 – 4	Traktor Stalingrad	Tashkent
	1:0 Adisman 6'		1:1 Provornov 57'; 1:2 Provornov 67'; 1:3 Terentyev; 1:4 Shlyapin	Stadium: Dinamo; Referee: Bukharin

3 September 1937 8	Traktor Stalingrad	7 – 2	Torpedo Gorky	Stalingrad
	1:1 Ponomarev; 2:1 Ponomarev 16'; 3:1 Terentyev 55'; 4:1 Terentyev 59'; 5:1 Shlyapin; 6:1 Ponomarev; 7:1 Provornov		0:1 Salakov 8'; 7:2 Dunaev	Stadium: Traktor; Referee: Andronnikov

7 September 1937 9	Krylia Sovetov Moscow	3 – 1	Traktor Stalingrad	Moscow
	Yenushkov; Karasev; Rzhevtsev		Shlyapin	Stadium: Krylia Sovetov; Referee: G.Fenopov (Leningrad)

12 September 1937 10	Traktor Stalingrad	2 – 2	DKA BVO Smolensk	Stalingrad
	1:0 Ponomarev; 2:0 Provornov 10'		Petrov; Marushkin	Stadium: Traktor; Referee: Bychkov

18 September 1937 11	Kirov's Factory Leningrad	1 – 1	Traktor Stalingrad	Leningrad
	Zherdin		Kolesnikov	Stadium: Kirov's Factory; Referee: Korneyev

==== Table ====
Pos	Team	Pld	W	D	L	GF	GA	GD	Pts
1	Traktor Stalingrad	11	8	2	1	40	14	+26	29
2	DKA BVO Smolensk	11	8	1	2	30	12	+18	28
3	Krylia Sovetov Moscow	11	6	3	2	28	19	+9	26
4	Burevestnik Moscow	11	6	1	4	33	20	+13	24
5	Dinamo Baku	11	5	2	4	24	15	+9	23
6	Stal Kostiantynivka	11	6	0	5	23	25	−2	23
7	Kirov's Factory Leningrad	11	5	2	4	15	19	−4	23
8	Dinamo Tashkent	11	4	3	4	16	21	−5	22
9	Stal Dnipropetrovsk	11	3	4	4	20	27	−7	21
10	Torpedo Gorky	11	2	2	7	19	34	−15	16
11	Neftyanik Baku	11	2	1	8	14	31	−17	16
12	Spartak Yerevan	11	0	1	10	6	31	−25	10

Promoted
Relegated

== Statistics ==
=== Squad statistics ===
==== Appearances and goals ====
No.	Pos	Nat	Player	Total		USSR Championship		Soviet Cup	
No.	Pos	Nat	Player	Apps	Goals	Apps	Goals	Apps	Goals
	GK	(Soviet Union) URS	Arkadi Usov	11	-14	9	-11	2	-3
	GK	(Soviet Union) URS	Anatoli Kopylov	3	-4	2	-3	1	-1
	DF	(Soviet Union) URS	Ivan Tyazhlov	12	0	10	0	2	0
	DF	(Soviet Union) URS	Fedor Klochkov	11	0	9	0	2	0
	DF	(Soviet Union) URS	Lev Kabov	3	0	3	0	0	0
	MF	(Soviet Union) URS	Georgi Ivanov	12	0	10	0	2	0
	MF	(Soviet Union) URS	Sergei Kolesnikov	13	1	11	1	2	0
	MF	(Soviet Union) URS	Nikolai Pokrovski	13	0	11	0	2	0
	MF	(Soviet Union) URS	Ivan Pichugin	2	0	1	0	1	0
	FW	(Soviet Union) URS	Aleksandr Ponomarev	13	11	11	9	2	2
	FW	(Soviet Union) URS	Georgi Shlyapin	13	11	11	9	2	2
	FW	(Soviet Union) URS	Vasili Provornov	13	8	11	8	2	0
	FW	(Soviet Union) URS	Boris Terentyev	11	8	11	8	0	0
	FW	(Soviet Union) URS	Valentin Liventsev	10	4	10	4	0	0
	FW	(Soviet Union) URS	Vasili Inzhevatkin	5	1	3	1	2	0
	FW	(Soviet Union) URS	Aleksandr Voevodin	4	0	2	0	2	0

Note: The seven goals scored are not considered because unknown who goalscorers in Tractor Stalingrad – Dynamo Saratov.

==== Top scorers ====
Player	USSR Championship	Soviet Cup	Total
Aleksandr Ponomarev	9	2	11
Georgi Shlyapin	9	2	11
Boris Terentyev	8	0	8
Vasili Provornov	8	0	8
Valentin Liventsev	4	0	4
Sergei Kolesnikov	1	0	1
Vasiliy Inzhevatkin	1	0	1
Total	40	11	51

Note: The seven goals scored are not considered because unknown who goalscorers in Tractor Stalingrad – Dynamo Saratov.

== General statistics ==
Tournament	Pld	W	D	L	GF	GA	GD	YC	RC	Pts
USSR Championship	11	8	2	1	40	14	+26	2	3	29/33 (87,9 %)
Soviet Cup	2	1	0	1	11	4	+7	?	1	4/6 (66,7 %)
Total	13	9	2	2	51	18	+33	2	4	33/39 (84,6 %)

== Sources ==
- Летопись областного футбола. Царицын. Сталинград. Волгоград. 1909-1962 [Chronicles of the regional football. Tsaritsyn. Stalingrad. Volgograd. 1909-1962] (in Russian). 2000. p. 238.
- Sklyarenko, Aleksandr (2000). «РОТОР» от сталинградского «Трактора» до наших дней. Футбольные хроники [Rotor from Traktor Stalingrad to this day. Football chronicles] (in Russian). Volgograd: Volgogradskaya pravda. p. 288. Archived from the original on 2014-02-21.
