= The Goalkeeper (1936 film) =

- Russian: Вратарь
- Directed by: Semyon Timoshenko
- Written by: Lev Kassil; Lazar Yudin
- Produced by: Igor Chernyak
- Starring: Grigory Pluzhnik; Tatyana Guretskaya; Lyudmila Glazova; Anatoliy Goryunov; Valeri Solovtsov
- Cinematography: Vladimir Danashevsky
- Music by: Isaak Dunayevsky
- Production company: Lenfilm
- Release date: 1936
- Running time: 75 min.
- Country: Soviet Union
- Language: Russian

The Goalkeeper (Russian: Вратарь, romanized: Vratar) is a 1936 Soviet sports-musical comedy film directed by Semyon Timoshenko. The screen version of novel by Lev Kassil Goalkeeper of the Republic, one of the first literary works about sport in the USSR. It also became the first Soviet full-length feature film about association football.

== Plot ==
The film tells the story of a simple young man, Anton Kandidov. Initially working in agriculture, he ferries watermelons across the Volga River by boat. Impressed by his agility in catching and loading watermelons, someone suggests he could become a goalkeeper and play football. Anton decides to follow this advice.

Players from the Moscow factory football team "Hydro-Air" notice Anton's skills while returning from a trip and invite him to join their team as a goalkeeper. Soon, Anton becomes known as the best goalkeeper in Moscow, and the fame goes to his head.

Neglecting his duties at the factory, Anton reacts poorly to criticism from his colleagues and quits "Hydro-Air" to join their rivals, "Torpedo." During a match between the two teams, Anton concedes an early goal and resorts to unsportsmanlike conduct, leading to his expulsion from the field by the referee.

With the help of his teammates, Anton realizes his mistakes and returns to "Hydro-Air." Later, an international team, the "Black Buffalos," arrives in the Soviet Union for a match. Representing the USSR team, Anton valiantly defends the goal. In the final moments of the game, the "Black Buffalos" are awarded a penalty kick, but Anton not only saves it but also sprints to the opposing goal and scores the winning goal.

== Cast ==
- Grigory Pluzhnik as Anton Kandidov
- Tatyana Guretskaya as Grusha
- Lyudmila Glazova as Nastya, lab technician
- Anatoliy Goryunov as Karasik, an engineer
- Valeri Solovtsov as Bukhvostov, captain of 'Gidraer' (Hydro-Air) football club
- Yakov Gudkin as Foma, 'Gidraer' inside forward
- Vladimir Kryuger as Tsvetochkin, captain of FC 'Torpedo'
- German Erazmus as Redhead, 'Torpedo' inside forward
- Fyodor Kurikhin as 'Gidraer' supporter
- Konstantin Shchegotsky, Anton Idzkovsky, Makar Goncharenko as cameo

== Criticism ==
The film was first reviewed in the Soviet magazine "Iskustvo kino" for 1937 where I.Berezark was complimentary about it for the movie director S.Timoshenko who in his opinion risked in this genre of comedy.

In 1964, a cinema critic Rostislav Yurenev considered the film to be one of the best film comedies of S. Timoshenko. At the same time, he believed that the image of the goalkeeper was outlined schematically. “The schematic nature of the central image threatened to decisively affect the comedy quality of the film “The Goalkeeper,” the critic wrote, “but, fortunately, against the will of the authors, the figure of engineer Karasik was in the center of attention of the audience. The actor A. Goryunov with great warmth showed a fat, bald, clumsy, but kind and talented person”.

The film is mentioned in the Axel Vartanyan's annals for the year of 1937. Mr. Vartanyan stated that its showing in the beginning of the 1937 football season in the Soviet Union was in a way start of it. Vartanyan points that "the critics, fierce from long abstinence, pounced on the unfortunate victim with the cruelty of piranhas, exposing the skeleton in a matter of minutes." In mid-December 1936, a public screening of the film took place at the Moscow Cinema House, and in early January it was released on all-Union screens. Critics greeted the film with poorly concealed irritation. The successes included the acting of individual actors, the music of composer Dunaevsky, and the football scenes, which is natural considering that the masters of Kyiv's Dynamo participated in them.

In 1937 one of the critics Tsvainik (in "Krasny Sport" newspaper) wrote: "Alas, the film did not live up to expectations... "The Goalkeeper" is easily broken into two parts. The first part is quite successful filming of football competitions, which are watched with great interest. The second part is love and the inevitable re-education of the heroes, carried out by the director with incomprehensible haste... The director, who took on the production of a sports film, considers sports as a background against which he begins to develop trivial love affairs... and if it were not for the harsh necessity - sports would be forgotten... In order to cause laughter in the audience, there is no need to force the actor to protect the goal of his team with an inconveniently named part of the body... "The Goalkeeper" is far from a masterpiece."

Another critic Belyayev (in "Spartak" newspaper from Leningrad) wrote: "The story of the Volga region native Anton Kandidov... is boring, uninteresting. The primitive plot, tacked on with white thread to good sports footage, is watched by the viewer with indifference. The film is too neat, the excess of sun, beautiful landscapes and happy faces (without the slightest trace of thought on them) leaves an imprint of unnaturalness on the whole film. The heroes of the film get all this too easily, and this causes mistrust." Having started with a lot of criticism, the author ends his review on a light note: "The football footage was shot brilliantly. They, in fact, save the film... On the whole, the film is watched with interest, Dunaevsky's music is cheerful and melodic. It's a pity that there is not enough of it. It is gratifying that sports themes are attracting more and more attention from our cinematography. Soviet sports have the right to this attention. But we need to make films more serious, better, more cultured."

On the personal note, Axel Vartanyan stated: "The film is indeed light, naive, with a moral, the essence of which was expressed thirty years later by a character in Leonid Gaidai's famous comedy (Kidnapping, Caucasian Style) in a toast made especially for the capital's guest: let's drink to each of us, no matter how high we fly, never breaking away from the team. Neglect of this truth was the reason for the problems that arose in the main character, Anton Kandidov, in his personal life and sports. This made critics nervous, and the audience (they did not read the reviews or did not pay attention to them), as in the days of big football, stood in long lines for tickets. They were attracted by the exciting football matches, and, of course, the happy ending: the USSR national football team beat the best foreign professionals - the "Black Buffalos", and two loving hearts, having overcome obstacles, rushed towards each other.

The implausible, fantastic ending of the match (it especially irritated the whining critics), when Anton Kandidov, in the last minute, having parried a penalty, rushed across the entire field and scored the winning goal, fit in well with the comedy genre of the film, causing a stormy reaction from the audience.

== Production details ==
The film was filmed in Kyiv at the All-Ukrainian Stadium "Dynamo" in honor of Vsevolod Balitsky (today Stadium "Dynamo" in honor of Valery Lobanovsky).

The whole team of Dynamo Kyiv took part as a cast in film and missed its scheduled match of the 1936 Soviet Cup in Moscow Oblast and was awarded a forfeit. The Dynamo goalkeeper Anton Idzkovsky for two months personally coached the lead actor to play as a professional goalkeeper.

== See also ==
- Goalkeeper of the Galaxy
- 1936 Soviet Cup
- 1937 in Soviet football
