= 1937 Soviet Cup =

1937 Cup of USSR in Football
Кубок СССР

Tournament details
- Country: Soviet Union
- Dates: May 23 – July 16
- Teams: 125

Final positions
- Champions: Dinamo Moscow (1st title)
- Runners-up: Dinamo Tbilisi
- Semifinalists: CDKA Moscow; Lokomotiv Moscow

Tournament statistics
- Top goal scorer: Vasily Smirnov (Dinamo Moscow) – 6 goals

The 1937 Soviet Cup was an association football cup competition of the Soviet Union.

The defending champions and the main team of the People's Commissariat of Railways Lokomotiv Moscow was defeated in semifinals by the main team of the Soviet security forces (NKVD) Dynamo Moscow. Domination of the Dynamo sports society was noticeable with five of its teams were able to reach quarterfinals. The competition was carried out during times known today as the Great Purge.

== Participating teams ==
Enter in First Round
29 teams of masters	95 other teams	
✓ CDKA Moscow; ✓ Dinamo Kiev; ✓ Dinamo Leningrad; ✓ Dinamo Moscow; ✓ Krasnaya Zaria Leningrad; ✓ Lokomotiv Moscow; ✓ Spartak Moscow; ✓ Dinamo Tbilisi ✓ Stalinets Moscow; ✓ Dinamo Rostov-na-Donu; ✓ Torpedo Moscow; ✓ Selmash Kharkov; ✓ Metallurg Moscow; ✓ Stalinets Leningrad; ✓ Temp Baku; ✓ Spartak Leningrad ✓ Dinamo Kazan; ✓ Dinamo Odessa; ✓ Spartak Kharkov; ✓ Dinamo Kharkov; ✓ Lokomotiv Tbilisi; ✓ Dinamo Dnepropetrovsk; ✓ Ugolschiki Stalino ✓ Dinamo Gorkiy; ✓ Lokomotiv Kiev; ✓ Stal Konstantinovka; ✓ Traktor Kharkov; ✓ Traktor Stalingrad; ✓ Stal Dnepropetrovsk	✓ DKA Ashkhabad (+); ✓ Dinamo Baku; ✓ Lokomotiv Baku (+); ✓ Neftianik Baku (+); ✓ Stroiteli Baku; ✓ Dinamo Batumi; ✓ Dinamo Bolshevo; ✓ Temp Chebokssary (+); ✓ Dinamo Chelyabinsk; ✓ Traktor Cherlyabinsk (+) ✓ Zolotoprofsoyuz Chita (+); ✓ Lokomotiv Dnepropetrovsk; ✓ Spartak Dnepropetrovsk (+); ✓ Zavod imeni Petrovskogo Dnepropetrovsk; ✓ Metallurg Elektrostal (+); ✓ Krylia Sovetov Gorkiy (+); ✓ Torpedo Gorkiy; ✓ Spartak Gorkiy (+); ✓ Dinamo Irkutsk (+); ✓ Krylia Sovetov Irkutsk (+) ✓ Dinamo Ivanovo (+); ✓ Spartak Ivanovo; ✓ Torpedo Izhevsk (+); ✓ Zenit Izhevsk; ✓ Lokomotiv Kharkov; ✓ Stalinets Kharkov (+); ✓ Zdorovye Kharkov (+); ✓ Spartak Kiev; ✓ Dinamo Kirov (+); ✓ Snaiper Kirov (+) ✓ Dzerzhinets Kolomna; ✓ Stroitel Komsomolsk-na-Amure (+); ✓ Avangard Kramatorsk (+); ✓ Zavod imeni Stalina Kramatorsk (+); ✓ Dinamo Krasnoyarsk (+); ✓ Stroitel Krivoi Rog (+); ✓ Spartak Kuibyshev; ✓ Zenit Kuibyshev (+); ✓ Dinamo Kungur; ✓ Dinamo Kursk (+) ✓ DKA Leningrad (+); ✓ GOLIFK Leningrad (+); ✓ Izhorsky Zavod (Avangard) Leningrad (+); ✓ Kirovsky Zavod (Avangard) Leningrad (+); ✓ Zavod imeni Ordzhonikidze Leningrad (+); ✓ Zavod imeni Stalina Leningrad (+); ✓ Dinamo Lyubertsy; ✓ Selmash Lyubertsy (+); ✓ Metallurg Magnitogorsk (+); ✓ Dinamo Minsk	✓ Spartak Minsk (+); ✓ Burevestnik Moscow; ✓ Dinamo-2 Moscow; ✓ Energiya Moscow; ✓ KIM Moscow (+); ✓ Krasnaya Roza Moscow (+); ✓ Krasnoye Znamia Moscow (+); ✓ Krasny Konditer Moscow (+); ✓ Krylia Sovetov Moscow; ✓ Lokomotiv-2 Moscow ✓ Pravda Moscow; ✓ Spartak-2 Moscow (+); ✓ Sudostroitel Nikolayev; ✓ Krasnoye Znamia Noginsk; ✓ Industrialny Institut Novocherkassk (+); ✓ Dinamo Novosibirsk (+); ✓ Spartak Novosibirsk (+); ✓ Dinamo Omsk (+); ✓ Krasnoye Znamia Orekhovo-Zuyevo; ✓ Monolit Orekhovo-Zuyevo (+) ✓ Burevestnik Rostov-na-Donu; ✓ Spartak Ryazan (+); ✓ Krylia Sovetov Rybinsk (+); ✓ Dinamo Saratov (+); ✓ Spartak Saratov (+); ✓ Lokomotiv Serpukhov (+); ✓ Sudostroitel Sevastopol; ✓ Lokomotiv Slaviansk-na-Kubani (+); ✓ DKA BVO Smolensk; ✓ Sudostroitel Sormovo (+) ✓ Dinamo Stalinabad (+); ✓ Metallurg Stalingrad (+); ✓ Metallurg Stalinsk (+); ✓ Zenit Taganrog (+); ✓ Spartak Tashkent (+); ✓ Lokomotiv Vologda (+); ✓ Dinamo Voronezh; ✓ Dzerzhinets Voroshilovgrad (+); ✓ Avangard Votkinsk (+); ✓ Lokomotiv Yaroslavl (+) ✓ Lokomotiv Yasinovataya (+); ✓ Krasnoye Znamia Yegoryevsk; ✓ Dinamo Yerevan (+); ✓ Stroitel Yerevan (+); ✓ Krylia Sovetov Zaporozhye

Source: []

Notes

- Dzerzhinets Bezhitsa and Spartak Yerevan (+) were given bye to the second round.
- (+) indicates teams that debuted in the competition.
- Former team of masters Dinamo Piatigorsk was not included in the competition. Also, the competition missed seven more teams that for the 1937 season were granted status of teams of masters: Spartak Kalinin, Dinamo Tashkent, Dinamo Sverdlovsk, Dinamo Alma-Ata, Sudostroitel Vladivostok, DKA Omsk, Lokomotiv Krasnoyarsk.

== Organizational changes ==
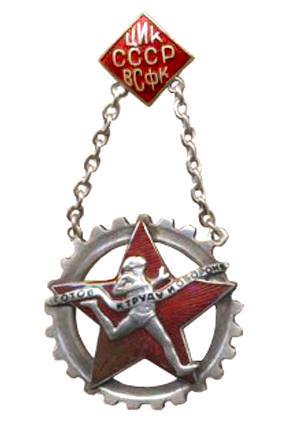
The 1930s GTO badge

Some 125 teams from more than six dozen cities entered the competition. In regard to numbers among the cities dominated Muscovite teams, while among the sports societies - "Dynamo". The tournament was organized much better, and there was more order. If in the 1936 Soviet Cup about a dozen and a half teams and judges did not show up to the matches, in the 1937 there was not a single no-show.

A step forward was made in the coverage of the cup tournament. On the eve of the start, "Krasny Sport" published information about the average age and experience of the participants and the holders of the "2nd class GTO" badges, the performances of the team captains, an article by Mikhail Romm, a forecast by the chairman of the All-Union Collegium of Judges Vladimir Ryabokon.

The Soviet and Russian football journalist and sport historian Aksel Vartanyan in his the Aksel Vartanyan annals indicated that Dinamo Tbilisi team of masters were considered the favorites of the tournament considering the newspaper articles of that period.

== Competition schedule ==
=== First round ===
[May 23] 
Lokomotiv Vologda                    1-10 CDKA Moskva 
SPARTAK Kiev                         7-3  Monolit Orekhovo-Zuyevo 
[May 24] 
Izhorsky Zavod (Avangard) Leningrad  3-3  Spartak Minsk 
Avangard Votkinsk                    0-8  DINAMO Kazan  
DINAMO Batumi                        2-0  Stroiteli Baku 
DINAMO Gorkiy                        5-1  SelMash Lyubertsy
Dinamo Ivanovo                       0-4  SPARTAK-2 Moskva  
DINAMO Kiev                          3-0  DKA BVO Smolensk 
  [Pavel Komarov 1, Nikolai Makhinya 85, Konstantin Shchegodskiy 88] 
DINAMO Kirov                         2-1  Krylya Sovetov Gorkiy 
  [V.Vedernikov, Tatarintsev – A.Tabakov] 
DINAMO Krasnoyarsk                   4-2  Krylya Sovetov Irkutsk 
  [K.Litvinov 5, P.Leonov 30, 33, V.Sokolov 40 - ?] 
Dinamo Kungur                        1-8  DINAMO Leningrad  
Dinamo Kursk                         2-6  STALINETS Moskva           [aet] 
Dinamo Lyubertsy                     1-3  TORPEDO Gorkiy 
  [? - Leonid Yefimov, Viktor Drozdov, Nikolai Dunayev] 
Dinamo Minsk                         1-4  DINAMO Moskva 
  [Viktor Lakhonin 56 – Mikhail Semichastny 43, Sergei Ilyin 80, 88 pen, Alexei Ponomaryov 83] 
DINAMO Odessa                        7-0  Krasnoye Znamya Orekhovo-Zuyevo 
  [Leonid Orekhov 10, Mikhail Malkhasov 20, Ivan Borisevich 40, Yuzef Sositskiy 50, Vladimir Tokar 60, ?, ?] 
DINAMO Stalinabad                    2-1  Spartak Tashkent 
  [K.Pogorelov, P.Babich - ?] 
Dinamo Voronezh                      0-1  SPARTAK Kharkov            [asdet] 
  [Anatoliy Lesnoi 133] 
DKA Leningrad                        2-1  Krasnoye Znamya Moskva 
DZERZHINETS Voroshilovgrad           4-2  Krasnaya Zarya Leningrad 
  [Nikolai Lakotosh-2, Vladimir Movchan, ? - Pyotr Grigoryev, ?] 
GOLIFK Leningrad                     7-2  Metallurg Elektrostal 
Industrialny Institut Novocherkassk  1-3  DINAMO Kharkov 
  [Semyonov 69 pen – Vasiliy Makarov 10, ?, ?] 
KRASNOYE ZNAMYA Noginsk              4-1  Krasny Konditer Moskva 
KRYLYA SOVETOV Moskva                3-0  Lokomotiv Kiev 
Krylya Sovetov Rybinsk               1-9  SPARTAK Ivanovo 
LOKOMOTIV Dnepropetrovsk             7-2  KIM Moskva 
LOKOMOTIV Kharkov                    3-1  Kirovsky Zavod (Avangard) Leningrad 
LOKOMOTIV Serpukhov                  2-1  Krylya Sovetov Zaporozhye 
Lokomotiv Slavyansk-na-Kubani        0-6  DINAMO Rostov-na-Donu 
LOKOMOTIV Tbilisi                    4-1  Dinamo Baku 
Lokomotiv Yaroslavl                  1-5  KRASNOYE ZNAMYA Yegoryevsk 
  [M.Serdyukov 25 - ?] 
Lokomotiv Yasinovataya               0-6  DINAMO Dnepropetrovsk 
METALLURG Magnitogorsk               3-1  Dinamo Chelyabinsk 
Metallurg Stalingrad                 2-3  TORPEDO Moskva             [aet] 
  [Sergei Protsenko 15, ? - ?] 
NEFTYANIK Baku                       1-0  Dinamo Yerevan 
SELMASH Kharkov                      1-0  Lokomotiv-2 Moskva         [aet]
  [Fyodor Morgunov 94] 
SNIPER Kirov                         2-0  Zenit Izhevsk 
  [S.Kosaryov 25, ?] 
SPARTAK Novosibirsk                  2-0  Metallurg Stalinsk   
Spartak Saratov                      3-5  SPARTAK Kuibyshev          [aet] 
  [Ryazanov, Gusev, Serebryakov - ?] 
Stal Konstantinovka                  2-5  METALLURG Moskva 
  [? – Grigoriy Fedotov 12, Pavel Kudryavtsev 17, Nikolai Kononenko 57, ?...] 
Stalinets Leningrad                  1-2  AVANGARD Kramatorsk 
  [Konstantin Sazonov 75 – G.Korostynskiy 28, I.Korostylyov 72] 
STROITEL Krivoi Rog                  w/o  Krasnaya Roza Moskva 
Stroitel Yerevan                     1-6  TEMP Baku 
Sudostroitel Nikolayev               0-4[a]  LOKOMOTIV Moskva 
  [Viktor Novikov 50, Gaik Andriasov 55, Nikolai Ilyin 60, ?] 
Sudostroitel Sevastopol              0-1  ZDOROVYE Kharkov 
  [Poluyanov 40] 
Sudostroitel Sormovo                 0-3  SPARTAK Moskva 
  [Stepan Kustylkin 10, 20, Viktor Semyonov ?] 
Temp Cheboksary                      1-9  DINAMO-2 Moskva 
  [Bespalov 59 – Nikolai Postavnin 16, 31, Savostyanov 22, 40, 65, Ukhmylov 43, Morozov 54, Mysin 71, Fursov 82 pen] 
TORPEDO Izhevsk                      2-1  Spartak Gorkiy 
Traktor Chelyabinsk                  2-3  DINAMO Omsk                [aet]
TRAKTOR Kharkov                      1-0  Burevestnik Moskva 
TRAKTOR Stalingrad                   9-1  Dinamo Saratov 
ZENIT Kuibyshev                      2-0  Spartak Ryazan  
  [I.Kuznetsov 45, A.Chuprunov 65] 
Zenit Taganrog                       1-9  DINAMO Tbilisi 
  [Bagnenko – Mikhail Berdzenishvili, Boris Paichadze, ?...] 
Zavod imeni Ordzhonikidze Leningrad  3-1  Dzerzhinets Kolomna 
Zavod imeni Stalina Kramatorsk[b]     1-6  SPARTAK Dnepropetrovsk 
Zavod imeni Stalina Leningrad[c]      2-5  STALINETS Kharkov 
ZOLOTOPROFSOYUZ Chita                3-2  Stroitel Komsomolsk-na-Amure 
  [V.Antonov-2, V.Volkov-pen – M.Fedyushkin-2] 
[May 25] 
LOKOMOTIV Baku                       4-0  DKA Ashkhabad 
Stakhanovets Stalino                 1-2  SPARTAK Leningrad 
  [Vasiliy Sidorov 33 - ?] 
[May 26] 
DINAMO Bolshevo                      2-1  Burevestnik Rostov-na-Donu 
Dinamo Irkutsk                       0-2  DINAMO Novosibirsk  
[May 27] 
Stal Dnepropetrovsk                  0-2  ENERGIYA Moskva 
Zavod imeni Petrovskogo Dnepropetrovsk 0-1  PRAVDA Moskva

==== First round replays ====
[May 26] 
Izhorsky Zavod (Avangard) Leningrad  1-3  SPARTAK Minsk

=== Second round ===
[May 29] 
SPARTAK Leningrad                    5-0  Pravda Moskva 
[May 30] 
Avangard Kramatorsk                  0-0  SelMash Kharkov 
CDKA Moskva                          5-0  Torpedo Izhevsk 
  [Mikhail Kireyev 9, 19, 37, Nikolai Isayev 23 pen, ?] 
Dinamo Batumi                        0-1  NEFTYANIK Baku 
Dinamo Krasnoyarsk                   2-3  SPARTAK Novosibirsk 
  [V.Sokolov, P.Leonov – N.Volkov, Fomin, ?] 
DINAMO Odessa                        3-1  Zdorovye Kharkov           [aet]
  [Mikhail Malkhasov 4, Leonid Orekhov 100 pen, 110 pen – G.Kulishov 80] 
Dinamo Omsk                          1-5  DINAMO Kazan 
DINAMO Rostov-na-Donu                8-1  Energiya Moskva 
Dzerzhinets Bezhitsa                 4-6  SPARTAK Dnepropetrovsk     [aet] 
DZERZHINETS Voroshilovgrad           2-1  Traktor Kharkov 
  [Movchan 20, Nosko 25 pen – Alexandr Moskalyov ?] 
KRASNOYE ZNAMYA Noginsk              3-0  Spartak Minsk 
  [Glazkov 15, 35, Vasiliy Zharkov 65] 
Krasnoye Znamya Yegoryevsk           0-3  DINAMO Moskva 
  [Vasiliy Smirnov 21, Alexei Ponomaryov 33, Mikhail Yakushin 68] 
LOKOMOTIV Dnepropetrovsk             3-2  Metallurg Moskva 
  [Gotselyuk 10 pen, 70, Seryogin 81 – Kuzin 33, Selin 55] 
Lokomotiv Kharkov                    1-6  LOKOMOTIV Moskva 
  [Mikhailichenko 6 – Mikhail Zhukov 40, 85, Pyotr Terenkov ?, ?...] 
Lokomotiv Serpukhov                  1-5  DINAMO-2 Moskva 
  [Kryukov 73 – Savostyanov 10, Ukhmylov 25, Morozov 41, Shcherbov 64 – Lapshin 82] 
LOKOMOTIV Tbilisi                    3-1  Temp Baku 
Metallurg Magnitogorsk               0-5  DINAMO Leningrad 
  [Pyotr Dementyev 12, Pyotr Bykov 27, Nikolai Svetlov 38, Viktor Fyodorov 85 pen, ?] 
Sniper Kirov                         0-8  GOLIFK Leningrad 
Spartak Ivanovo                      1-2  DINAMO Gorkiy 
SPARTAK Kharkov                      4-1  DKA Leningrad 
  [Anatoliy Lesnoi, Alexei Serov, Naum Knyazhevskiy, Ivan Serov – F.Ivanov] 
SPARTAK Kiev                         w/o[d]  Dinamo Dnepropetrovsk
Spartak Kuibyshev                    1-4  TORPEDO Moskva 
  [A.Semyonov 55 – Viktor Semyonov 12, ?..] 
Stalinets Kharkov                    1-5  KRYLYA SOVETOV Moskva 
STALINETS Moskva                     2-1  Spartak-2 Moskva 
  [Sergei Ivanov 20, ? 55 – Nikolai Zhigalin 81] 
Stroitel Krivoi Rog                  0-3  DINAMO Kharkov 
TORPEDO Gorkiy                       4-0  Zenit Kuibyshev 
  [Nikolai Dunayev 15, 25, 35, Viktor Drozdov ?] 
ZiO Leningrad                        1-8  DINAMO Kiev 
  [? – Konstantin Shchegodskiy 10, 20, Makar Goncharenko 15, 35, 75, Ivan Kuzmenko 20, ?..] 
[May 31] 
Dinamo Kirov                         2-4  DINAMO Bolshevo 
DINAMO Tbilisi                       4-1  Spartak Yerevan 
  [Mikhail Berdzenishvili 40, Boris Paichadze 60, Tengiz Gavasheli 70, Nikolai Somov 80 – Paruir Aroyan 30] 
SPARTAK Moskva                       3-2  Traktor Stalingrad         [asdet]
  [Viktor Semyonov 50, Vladimir Stepanov 85, Georgiy Glazkov 127 – Alexandr Ponomaryov 22, Georgiy Shlyapin 58] 
ZolotoProfSoyuz Chita                0-1  DINAMO Novosibirsk 
  [G.Smurov]  
[Jun 3] 
LOKOMOTIV Baku                       5-2  Dinamo Stalinabad

==== Second round replays ====
[Jun 1] 
AVANGARD Kramatorsk                  1-0  SelMash Kharkov 
  [G.Korotinskiy]

=== Third round ===
[Jun 5] 
CDKA Moskva                          2-1  Dinamo-2 Moskva 
  [Konstantin Malinin 72 pen] 
KRYLYA SOVETOV Moskva                3-0  Dzerzhinets Voroshilovgrad 
  [?, ?, Fyodor Karasyov 74] 
[Jun 6] 
Dinamo Gorkiy                        0-5  DINAMO Kiev 
  [Viktor Shilovskiy 13, 60, 86, Konstantin Shchegodskiy 20, S.Kozinets (DG) 29 og]
Dinamo Kharkov                       0-2  LOKOMOTIV Moskva 
  [? 46, Vasiliy Serdyukov 60] 
DINAMO Moskva                        5-2  Torpedo Gorkiy 
  [Mikhail Semichastny 14, Vasiliy Smirnov 30 pen, Alexei Ponomaryov 44, Sergei Ilyin 45, 66 – Leonid Yefimov 6, 61] 
DINAMO Tbilisi                       3-0  Neftyanik Baku 
  [Mikhail Aslamazov 4, Mikhail Berdzenishvili 10 pen, Boris Paichadze 68] 
Spartak Dnepropetrovsk               0-1  DINAMO Rostov-na-Donu 
  [Sergei Dombazov 50] 
SPARTAK Kharkov                      3-2  Lokomotiv Dnepropetrovsk   [aet] 
  [Alexei Serov 83, 85, Voronkov (L) 102 og – Vasiliy Gotsalyuk 25, 30] 
SPARTAK Kiev                         3-0  Avangard Kramatorsk  
Spartak Leningrad                    0-3  DINAMO Odessa 
  [Ivan Borisevich 22, Leonid Orekhov 42 pen, ?] 
[Jun 7] 
GOLIFK Leningrad                     2-1  Stalinets Moskva           [aet] 
Spartak Moskva                       1-1  Krasnoye Znamya Noginsk 
  [Viktor Semyonov 80 – Ye.Glazkov 50] 
TORPEDO Moskva                       2-1  Dinamo Bolshevo 
  [Viktor Listikov 23 pen, Konstantin Ryazantsev 51 – Viktor Osminkin 46] 
[Jun 8] 
Dinamo Leningrad                     0-1  SPARTAK Novosibirsk 
  [Dunayev 80] 
LOKOMOTIV Tbilisi                    3-1  Lokomotiv Baku 
[Jun 11] 
DINAMO Kazan                         6-0  Dinamo Novosibirsk

==== Third round replays ====
[Jun 9] 
SPARTAK Moskva                       5-0  Krasnoye Znamya Noginsk 
  [Viktor Semyonov 8, 44, Leonid Rumyantsev 14, Vladimir Stepanov 80, Stanislav Leuta 85]

=== Fourth round ===
[Jun 11] 
DINAMO Kazan                         6-0  Spartak Novosibirsk 
DINAMO Moskva                        3-2  GOLIFK Leningrad           [aet] 
  [Sergei Ilyin 71 pen, Vasiliy Smirnov 86, 96 pen – Leonid Noritsyn 57, Valentin Shelagin 58] 
[Jun 12] 
DINAMO Kiev                          4-2  Torpedo Moskva             [aet] 
  [Pyotr Laiko 16, Konstantin Shchegodskiy 63, 106, Ivan Kuzmenko 110 - ? 37, ? 73] 
DINAMO Odessa                        4-0  Krylya Sovetov Moskva 
  [Yuzef Sositskiy 15, Makar Gichkin 19, Ivan Borisevich 30, 62] 
DINAMO Tbilisi                       4-0  Lokomotiv Tbilisi 
  [Mikhail Berdzenishvili 32, 40 pen, Tengiz Gavasheli 57, Nikolai Somov 87]
LOKOMOTIV Moskva                     2-0  Dinamo Rostov-na-Donu 
  [Gaik Andriasov 61, 79] 
SPARTAK Kharkov                      4-0  Spartak Kiev 
  [Alexei Serov 15, 70, 83, Anatoliy Lesnoi 75] 
[Jun 13] 
CDKA Moskva                          1-0  Spartak Moskva             [aet] 
  [Mikhail Kireyev 118]

=== Quarterfinals ===
[Jun 17] 
LOKOMOTIV Moskva                     4-1  Spartak Kharkov 
  [Gaik Andriasov 20, 35, Pyotr Terenkov 37, 64 - ?] 
[Jun 18] 
CDKA Moskva                          3-1  Dinamo Odessa 
  [Nikolai Isayev 11, Konstantin Malinin 37 pen, Ivan Mitronov 59 – Leonid Orekhov 30]
[Jun 19] 
DINAMO Tbilisi                       2-1  Dinamo Kiev 
  [Mikhail Aslamazov 13, Mikhail Berdzenishvili 47 – Konstantin Shchegodskiy 84] 
[Jun 20] 
DINAMO Moskva                        5-1  Dinamo Kazan 
  [Sergei Ilyin 2, 88, Vasiliy Smirnov 47, Alexei Ponomaryov 50, Mikhail Semichastny 74 – Pavel Bogatyryov 25]

=== Semifinals ===
[Jun 30] 
CDKA Moskva                          0-1  DINAMO Tbilisi 
  [Boris Paichadze 83] 
[Jul 13] 
DINAMO Moskva                        4-1  Lokomotiv Moskva 
  [Vasiliy Smirnov 11 pen 30, Mikhail Semichastny 35, Mikhail Yakushin 85 – Mikhail Zhukov 65]

=== Final ===
16 July 1937

Dinamo Moscow	5 – 2	Dinamo Tbilisi
Smirnov 21' (pen.); Semichastny 22', 35', 72'; Ilyin 75'	[ Report]	Berdzenishvili 19'; Berdzenishvili 60' (pen.)

Central Stadium "Dynamo", Moscow
Attendance: 60,000
Referee: Vladimir Strepikheyev (Moscow)

== Top goalscorers ==
Statistical data is incomplete and based on rounds starting from the fourth round (Round of 16).

Scorer	Team	Goals
Vasiliy Smirnov	Dinamo Moscow	6 (3)
Mikhail Semichastny	Dinamo Moscow	5
Gaik Andriasov	Lokomotiv Moscow	4
Sergei Ilyin	Dinamo Moscow	4 (1)
Mikhail Berdzenishvili	Dinamo Tbilisi	4 (2)

== Issues ==
=== Scandal in Nikolayev ===
The referee appointed by the All-Union Committee of Physical Culture did not show up for the game between Nikolayev's Sudostroitel (Zavod imeni Marty) and the cup winner, Moscow's Lokomotiv (see Sudostroitel Nikolayev 0–4 Lokomotiv Moscow, May 30). This story made a lot of noise in the central press. And in the local press. The situation was explained by the Nikolayev newspaper "Za yakist i tempy" (Ukrainian for "For Quality and Pace") on May 28, 1937.

"On May 24, as is well known, the USSR Cup football match between the teams of Moscow Lokomotiv and our plant's team did not take place because the referee appointed by the All-Union Committee for Physical Culture and Sports did not arrive. It took a long time to persuade the football players to agree to hold a friendly match...

Believing that the match was unofficial, our team fielded several substitute players to save their strength for the Cup match. The first half of the game ended in a draw, and in the second half the Muscovites replaced several players and achieved a victory - 4:0.

The All-Union Committee for Physical Culture and Sports was informed that the USSR Cup game did not take place.

On May 25, a telegram was received from the All-Union Committee, which stated that the official match should be held on the 26th and that an Odessa referee would referee it.

On May 26, the first telegram was confirmed and a message from the judge from Odessa that he would come.

The match was organized. Thousands of tickets were sold, spectators took their seats at the stadium, waiting for the match to begin. But... In the evening, the Moscow Lokomotiv team received a telegram from the head of the All-Union Committee for Physical Culture and Sports, Comrade Kharchenko, that the friendly match that took place on the 24th was considered official."

— "Za yakist i tempy"

This illegal decision caused justified indignation among spectators, who demanded that the leaders of the physical culture organizations of the plant and the city resolutely protest this decision."

The newspaper "Krasny Sport" expressed its attitude to the incident on May 29 in an article entitled "MATCH "LOKOMOTIV" - "SUDOSTROITEL" MUST TAKE PLACE". Having briefly outlined the facts known to us, the newspaper concluded:

"The Marty Plant team sent a representative to Moscow to protest the Committee's decision. She [team] is certainly right. A clear injustice has been committed against the young, capable plant team... Comrade Kharchenko should reconsider his wrong decision."

— "Krasny Sport"

Indeed, petitioners ("khodoki") set out from Nikolaev to the capital on behalf of the city's factory, party and sports organizations in the hope of finding the truth in the highest offices of the main physical culture department. They went to Comrade Kharchenko not empty-handed, but with a petition drawn up by Nikolaev residents Ponomarenko and Satanovsky. Its content adds some rather curious details to what has already been said:

"... The All-Union Committee, notified by us, postponed the meeting for the Cup to May 26. Three telegrams from the All-Union Committee confirmed that the meeting would take place on May 26. On the 26th, ticket sales began in the afternoon. Never before had a single football match generated such interest as this match. People came to Nikolaev from Kherson, Odessa, from collective farms, MTS... From 2:30 the stadium began to fill up and by six o'clock it was full. We sent a bus for the Lokomotiv team. And suddenly, 15 minutes before the start of the game, we learned that the Lokomotiv players had boarded the bus and left, but not for the stadium, but for the train station. It turns out that while already sitting on the bus, they received two telegrams - one signed by the Deputy People's Commissar of Railways, Comrade Zimin, and the other signed by Comrade Kharchenko, stating that a friendly match had been announced official. It is difficult to describe what was happening at the stadium when the spectators, deceived for the second time, found out about all this. We offered to return the money. But no one wanted to return the tickets. And only after learning that Nikolaev's delegation was leaving for Moscow to protest the illegal decision, the indignant public began to disperse.

We ask: how can the game be considered official if:

a) the All-Union Committee does not have and will not have a protocol for the Cup game;

b) if the game was played according to the old rules (replacement of any number of players);

c) if the Cup rule on the appointment of referees by the All-Union panel was violated;

d) if they did not even listen to the representative of our team, limiting themselves to a statement from one side - the representative of "Lokomotiv"?

The most outrageous thing is that the All-Union Committee did not even consider it necessary to inform us of its decision, informing only the "Lokomotiv" team. We found out about it by chance, 15 minutes before the match. The Committee did not respond to our telegraphed protest, although before this decision, Comrade Raspevin sent three telegrams confirming that the match would take place.

The event that took place so excited the public of Nikolaev that the city's Soviet, party and professional organizations were forced to take up the matter, having filed a protest with the Soviet Control Commission.

It should be said that the Lokomotiv players, who received Comrade Zimin's order to leave, themselves felt awkward. They, like Soviet athletes, understand that the Cup must be won fairly, according to the rules and on the football field, and not in the office...

We ardently protest against the arbitrariness allowed and insist that the match "Lokomotiv" - "Sudostroitel" in Nikolaev take place."

— residents of Nikolayev

The illogical, contradictory, convulsive movements of the physical culture committee (the sudden cancellation of a three-time agreement to replay without explanation) mean one thing: the order for Kharchenko to leave Nikolayev was imposed from the outside. Those who know the political coordinate system of the 1930s and the name of the patron of "Lokomotiv" (Lazar Kaganovich) will easily guess which way the wind was blowing. It is more difficult to believe in the coincidence of the synchronized actions of the railway and physical culture departments. The petitioners ("khodoki") were knocking on the wrong doors. Even if they had been knocking on the right ones, what difference would it make. While the petitioners were knocking on the thresholds, the train left.

=== Security police scare tactics ===
Aksel Vartanyan in his "Annals" mentions that at least at local level NKVD was using scare tactics to help own football teams.

The oil workers of Azerbaijan (Neftyanik) were unlucky. A harsh fate handed them over to the internal affairs agencies of two neighboring republics - the Dynamo players of Yerevan, Batumi and Tbilisi. The Armenians were persuaded in Baku (1:0), and in Batumi, where "Neftyanik" beat the hosts with the same score, the team was subjected to a real, without quotes, interrogation after the game. The incident in the Adjara capital became known from a letter signed by 17 Baku football players.

"At midnight, the deputy responsible secretary of the Dynamo society, Aksava, arrived at the hotel where our team, Neftyanik, was staying, accompanied by the duty officer of the city police, Nikonov, and another person. Having taken the passports of the Neftyanik players from the hotel office, the investigators began to call in all 17 players of the team one by one for questioning. They spent a particularly long time questioning comrade Gnezdov, who scored a goal in the Batumi goal. Having completed the "night operation", the investigators left the hotel, taking with them the passports of Gnezdov and Sidorenko and asking them to go to the police department to see Nikonov.

The next morning, Gnezdov and Sidorenko were interrogated again in Nikonov's office, after which their passports were returned to them.

We are deeply outraged by such behavior of the heads of the physical education and administrative bodies of the city of Batumi. Who gave the right to the deputy responsible secretary of the Dynamo society, Aksava, "Should the police officer on duty Nikonov (who is also the head of the Dynamo team) violate Soviet laws and mock the athletes?"

— excerpt by Aksel Vartanyan

During the Great purge, after being questioned at night by the investigators in Batumi, they were released from the custody. After their release, they attempted to identify the official who they believed had acted against Soviet laws.

The story had a sequel. A week later, the oil workers appeared before the Tbilisi "investigators". Having learned from bitter experience, they behaved correctly and did not give any reason for arrest: without scoring a single goal, they lost 0:3. Satisfied with the results of the "interrogation", the Tbilisi "NKVD" officers found no evidence of a crime in their actions and let them go in peace.

=== Nine goals in one match legend ===
Many years later, a rumor began to circulate that all nine goals against Saratov team were scored by Aleksandr Ponomarev, who worked at the Stalingrad Tractor Plant (STZ) in the pre-war years. In his book "Moskovsky Futbol" (Moscow Football), Konstantin Yesenin published a conversation with Ponomarev. It took place in 1972, a year before the death of the player. Yesenin immediately took the bull by the horns:

" - Aleksandr Semenovich, the question is still unclear: did you score nine goals in the cup game or not?

- I did.

- And why was it not written anywhere?

- I don't know. I scored nine, and the guys, Provornov, Protsenko say: you need one more so it would be ten, and then glory will spread throughout the Union. And it was so that a penalty was called. The guys were calling me, you shoot! And I ran up, all warmed up, and... shot over the post.

- And who did you play?

- The Saratov team...

- Well, was it in the newspapers or not?

- In our city ones, I think it was.

- And you scored all nine by yourself? Neither Provornov, nor Protsenko - no one else got it?

- Yes, all nine, me. And the guys were all playing for me that day."

— Konstantin Yesenin, "Moskovsky Futbol"

As for the Stalingrad newspapers, Ponomarev was wrong: he had no idea. The newspaper clearly recorded the minutes of the balls that entered the goal, but mentioned the scorer only once, during the first one, that was scored in the 6th minute: "Ponomarev scores the first goal against the Dynamo players with a precise volley." Other Stalingrad newspapers were equally unforthcoming. There was a snag with Protsenko too. He could not play in that match, since he would transfer to Traktor Stalingrad later, in 1938. No other documentary evidence was found to confirm that record.

== Number of teams by union republic ==
Rank	Union republic	Number of teams
1	RSFSR	15 (Championship); 68 (non Championship); 83 (Total)
2	Ukrainian SSR	11 (Championship); 14 (non Championship); 25 (Total)
3	Georgian SSR	2 (Championship); 1 (non Championship); 3 (Total)
4	Azerbaijan SSR	1 (Championship); 4 (non Championship); 5 (Total)
5	Belarusian SSR	3 (non Championship); 3 (Total)
6	Armenian SSR	2 (non Championship); 2 (Total)
7	Tajik SSR	1 (non Championship); 1 (Total)
7	Turkmen SSR	1 (non Championship); 1 (Total)
7	Uzbek SSR	1 (non Championship); 1 (Total)

Notes:

- Out of the RSFSR team, Moscow was represented with 7 (Championship) and 11 (non Championship) teams and 18 teams in total. That was almost half of all championship teams (teams of masters). At the same time, Leningrad was represented with 4 (Championship) and 6 (non Championship) teams and 10 teams in total.
- The team from Smolensk (DKA BVO) represented the Belarusian Military District and competed in the Belarusian football competitions.

== See also ==
- 1937 Group A (Soviet football championship)
- 1937 Group B (Soviet football championship)
- 1937 Group V (Soviet football championship)
- 1937 Group G (Soviet football championship)
- 1937 groups D and cities of Far East
