= 1936 FC Dzerzhinets-STZ Stalingrad season =

Dzerzhinets-STZ Stalingrad
1936 season
- Manager: A. Sitnikov
- Stadium: STZ, Stalingrad
- Group IV: 5th
- Soviet Cup: Round of 16 vs Dinamo Tiflis
- Top goalscorer: League: All: Aleksandr Ponomarev
Home colours	Away colours

The 1936 Dzerzhinets-STZ Stalingrad season was the 1st season in USSR championships.

== Squad ==
Note: Flags indicate national team as defined under FIFA eligibility rules; some limited exceptions apply. Players may hold more than one non-FIFA nationality.

No.	Pos.	Nation	Player
—	GK	URS	Anatoli Kopylov
—	GK	URS	Arkadi Usov
—	DF	URS	S. Izmailov
—	DF	URS	Lev Kabov
—	DF	URS	Fedor Klochkov (captain)
—	DF	URS	Ivan Tyazhlov
—	MF	URS	Georgi Ivanov
—	MF	URS	Sergei Kolesnikov

No.	Pos.	Nation	Player
—	MF	URS	Nikolai Pokrovski
—	MF	URS	Vladimir Kharchenko
—	FW	URS	Konstantin Vavilov
—	FW	URS	Aleksandr Voevodin
—	FW	URS	Valentin Pozdnyshev
—	FW	URS	Aleksandr Ponomarev
—	FW	URS	Vasili Provornov
—	FW	URS	Aleksandr Sapronov

== Transfers ==
In: Note: Flags indicate national team as defined under FIFA eligibility rules; some limited exceptions apply. Players may hold more than one non-FIFA nationality.

No.	Pos.	Nation	Player
—	DF	URS	Fedor Klochkov (from (Soviet Union) Dynamo Stalingrad)
—	DF	URS	Ivan Tyazhlov (from (Soviet Union) Mashzavod Horlivka)
—	MF	URS	Georgi Ivanov
—	FW	URS	Aleksandr Voevodin (from (Soviet Union) Dynamo Stalingrad)
—	FW	URS	Aleksandr Ponomarev (from (Soviet Union) Stakhanovets Stalino)
—	FW	URS	Vasili Provornov (from (Soviet Union) Stalinets Moscow)

Out: Note: Flags indicate national team as defined under FIFA eligibility rules; some limited exceptions apply. Players may hold more than one non-FIFA nationality.

No.	Pos.	Nation	Player
—	FW	URS	Aleksandr Ponomarev (to (Soviet Union) Spartak Kharkiv)

== Competitions ==
=== Friendlies ===
18 August 1936	Dzerzhinets-STZ Stalingrad	6–1	Team of Sukhumi	Stalingrad

=== VCSPS Cup ===
August 1936	Vympel Astrakhan	1–5	Dzerzhinets-STZ Stalingrad

21 August 1936	Lokomotiv Moscow	3–3	Dzerzhinets-STZ Stalingrad	Moscow

22 August 1936 Replay	Lokomotiv Moscow	1–3	Dzerzhinets-STZ Stalingrad	Moscow

1936 Semifinal group. Match 1	Metrostroy Moscow	2–8	Dzerzhinets-STZ Stalingrad	Moscow

1936 Semifinal group. Match 2	Rekord Moscow	2–4	Dzerzhinets-STZ Stalingrad	Moscow

September 1936 Final	Avtozavod im. Molotova Gorky	2–1	Dzerzhinets-STZ Stalingrad	Moscow

For successful performance in the VCSPS Cup (participate in the final) Committee on Physical Culture and Sports included team of Stalingrad Tractor Factory in the number of participants of the autumn championship USSR. So Dzerzhinets-STZ became a professional team.

=== Soviet Cup ===
22 July 1936 Round of 128	Dzerzhinets-STZ Stalingrad	4–0	Dongostabfabrika Rostov-on-Don	Stalingrad
	1:0 Ponomarev 17'; 2:0 Ponomarev 60' (pen.); 3:0 Sapronov 75'; 4:0 Kolesnikov 76'			Stadium: STZ; Referee: E.Georgievski (Moscow)

28 July 1936 Round of 64	Dzerzhinets-STZ Stalingrad	W–L; Forfeit	Dynamo Dnipropetrovsk	Stalingrad
				Stadium: STZ; Referee: A.Blinkov (Stalingrad)

3 August 1936 Round of 32	Dzerzhinets Ordzhonikidzegrad	0–3	Dzerzhinets-STZ Stalingrad	Ordzhonikidzegrad
			0:1 Voevodin 40'; 0:2 Ponomarev 57'; 0:3 Ponomarev 90'	Referee: M.Dmitriev (Moscow)

12 August 1936 Round of 16	Dzerzhinets-STZ Stalingrad	1–3	Dinamo Tiflis	Stalingrad
	1:0 Ponomarev 22'		1:1 Paichadze 50'; 1:2 M.Berdzenishvili 64' (pen.); 1:3 Paichadze 87'	Stadium: STZ; Referee: A.Sokhranski (Moscow)

=== USSR Championship. Group IV ===
18 September 1936 1	Lokomotiv Kyiv	2–2	Dzerzhinets-STZ Stalingrad	Kiev
	1:0 Kuzmenko 5'; 2:1 A.Avramenko 50'		1:1 ? 2:2 ? 87'

22 September 1936 2	Traktor Factory Kharkiv	3–0	Dzerzhinets-STZ Stalingrad	Kharkiv
	Ivanov 38' (ag.)

30 September 1936 3	Dzerzhinets-STZ Stalingrad	0–3	Stal Dnipropetrovsk	Stalingrad
			0:1 Zabuga 7'; 0:2 Priymak 14'; 0:3 Kornorukov 88'	Stadium: STZ; Referee: N.Kaurov (Moscow)

6 October 1936 4	Dzerzhinets-STZ Stalingrad	W–L; Forfeit	Stal Kostiantynivka	Stalingrad

18 October 1936 5	Dynamo Gorky	1–3	Dzerzhinets-STZ Stalingrad	Gorky
	1:0 Melenyshev 25'		1:1 Vavilov 40'; 1:2 Ponomarev 52'; 1:3 Ponomarev 90'	Stadium: Dynamo; Referee: V.Ryabokon (Moscow)

==== Table ====
Pos	Team	Pld	W	D	L	GF	GA	GD	Pts
1	Traktor Factory Kharkiv	5	3	1	1	9	6	+3	12
2	Stal (Factory im. Lenin) Dnipropetrovsk	5	2	1	2	13	10	+3	10
3	Lokomotiv Kyiv	5	1	3	1	7	6	+1	10
4	Dynamo Gorky	5	2	1	2	5	6	−1	10
5	Dzerzhinets-STZ Stalingrad	5	2	1	2	5	9	−4	10
6	Stal (Factory im. Frunze) Kostiantynivka	5	1	1	3	3	5	−2	7

Promoted
Relegated

== General Statistics ==
Tournament	Pld	W	D	L	GF	GA	GD	Pts
USSR Championship	5	2	1	2	5	9	−4	10/15 (66,7 %)
Soviet Cup	4	3	0	1	8	3	+5	10/12 (83,3 %)
VCSPS Cup	6	4	1	1	24	11	+13	15/18 (83,3 %)
Total	15	9	2	4	37	23	+14	35/45 (77,8 %)

== Sources ==
- Летопись областного футбола. Царицын. Сталинград. Волгоград. 1909-1962 [Chronicles of the regional football. Tsaritsyn. Stalingrad. Volgograd. 1909-1962] (in Russian). 2000. p. 238.
- Sklyarenko, Aleksandr (2000). "РОТОР" от сталинградского "Трактора" до наших дней. Футбольные хроники [Rotor from Traktor Stalingrad to this day. Football chronicles] (in Russian). Volgograd: Volgogradskaya pravda. p. 288. Archived from the original on 2014-02-21.
- Ramzaytsev, D. (1995). Справочник-календарь "ФУТБОЛ-95" [Handbook-almanac "FOOTBALL-95"] (in Russian). Volgograd: Novaya gazeta. p. 96.
