= Gavriil Kachalin =

Russian footballer (1911–1995)

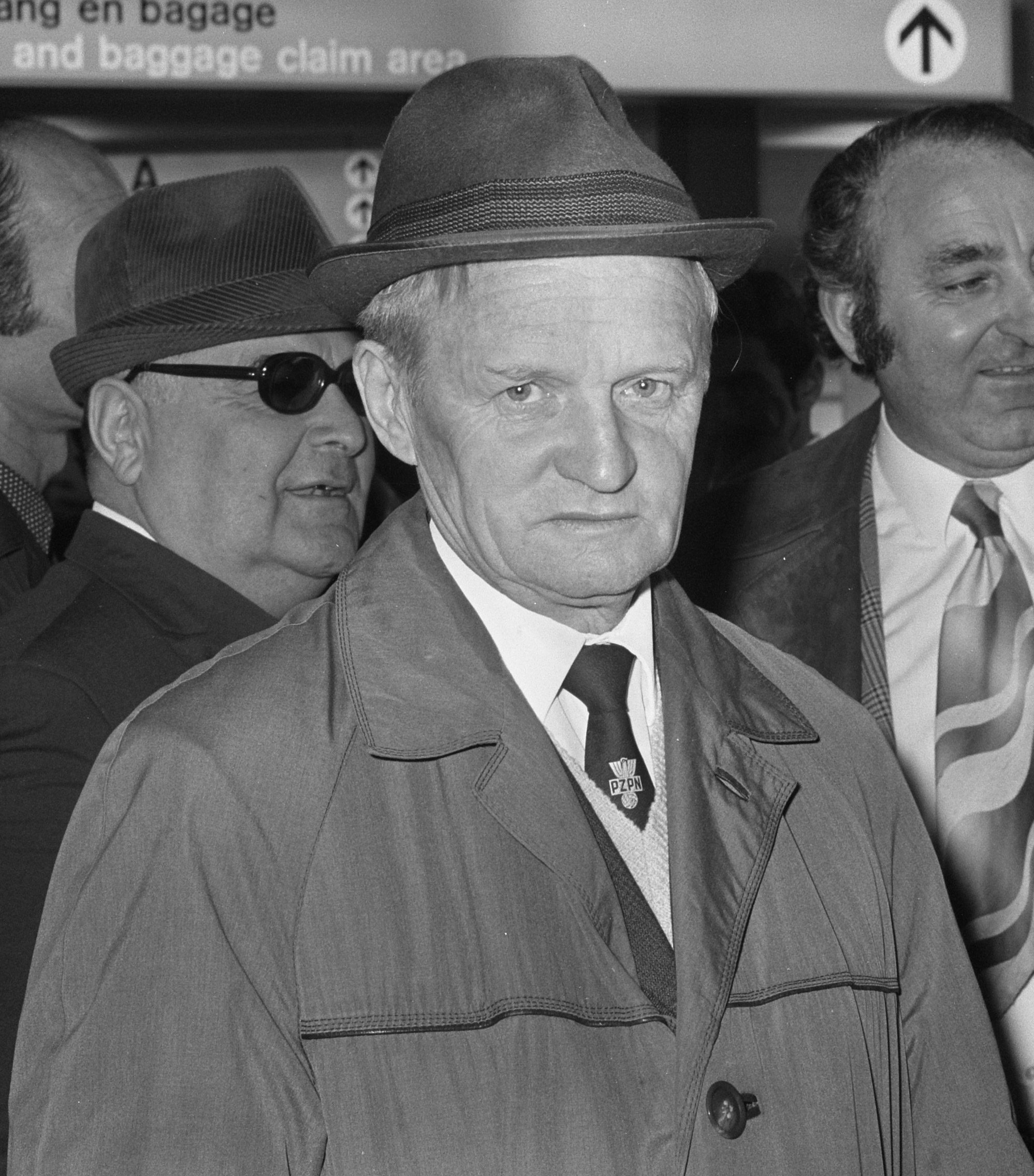
- Kachalin as manager of Dinamo Tbilisi in 1972

Personal information
- Full name: Gavriil Dmitriyevich Kachalin
- Date of birth: 17 January 1911
- Place of birth: Moscow, Russian Empire
- Date of death: 23 May 1995 (aged 84)
- Place of death: Moscow, Russia
- Height: 1.71 m (5 ft 7 in)
- Position: Midfielder

Senior career*
Years	Team	Apps	(Gls)
1928	Volny Trud Moscow		
1933–1935	Dynamo Gomel		
1936–1942	Dynamo Moscow	36	(0)
1945–1946	Trudovye Rezervy Moscow	22	(0)

Managerial career
- 1945–1948: Trudovye Rezervy Moscow
- 1949–1952: Lokomotiv Moscow
- 1955–1958: USSR
- 1960–1962: USSR
- 1963: Pakhtakor Tashkent
- 1964–1965: Dinamo Tbilisi
- 1965: USSR U-21
- 1966–1968: USSR Olympic
- 1968–1970: USSR
- 1971–1972: Dinamo Tbilisi
- 1973–1974: Dynamo Moscow
- 1975: Pakhtakor Tashkent
- * Club domestic league appearances and goals

Gavriil Dmitriyevich Kachalin (Russian: Гаврии́л Дми́триевич Кача́лин; 17 January 1911 – 23 May 1995) was a Soviet and Russian football player and coach.

He led the USSR national football team to their greatest achievements, Olympics gold medals in 1956 and European Football Championship title in 1960, and also coached them in three World Cups: 1958, 1962 and 1970.

With Kachalin, FC Dinamo Tbilisi won the first Soviet Top League title in their history in 1964 and later finished 3rd twice, in 1971 and in 1972. Kachalin became 3rd again in 1973 with FC Dynamo Moscow.

== Playing career ==
Kachalin started his career in 1928 in the club called Volny Trud. Then he played for Gomel city football team and FC Dynamo Gomel. From 1936 to 1942 he competed for FC Dynamo Moscow. During his career he played in 36 Soviet Top League matches, and became a twice champion in 1937 and 1940 and a Soviet Cup winner in 1937 with Dynamo Moscow. He also played against Basque Country national football team.

== Coaching career ==
Gavriil Kachalin was a head coach of following club and national teams:

- FC Trudovye Rezervy Moscow (1945–1948)
- FC Lokomotiv Moscow (1949–1952)
- USSR national football team as a head coach assistant (1954)
- USSR national football team (1955–1958, 1960–1962, 1968–1970)
- Pakhtakor Tashkent FK (1963, 1975)
- FC Dinamo Tbilisi (1964–1965, 1971–1972)
- USSR national under-21 football team (1965)
- USSR national olympics football team (1966–1968)
- FC Dynamo Moscow (1973–1974)

At the end of his career, Kachalin worked in Dynamo Moscow youth academy. He was a chairman of the Board of Coaches of Soviet Football Federation in 1963. Kachalin also was a member of FIFA technical committee.

== Achievements ==
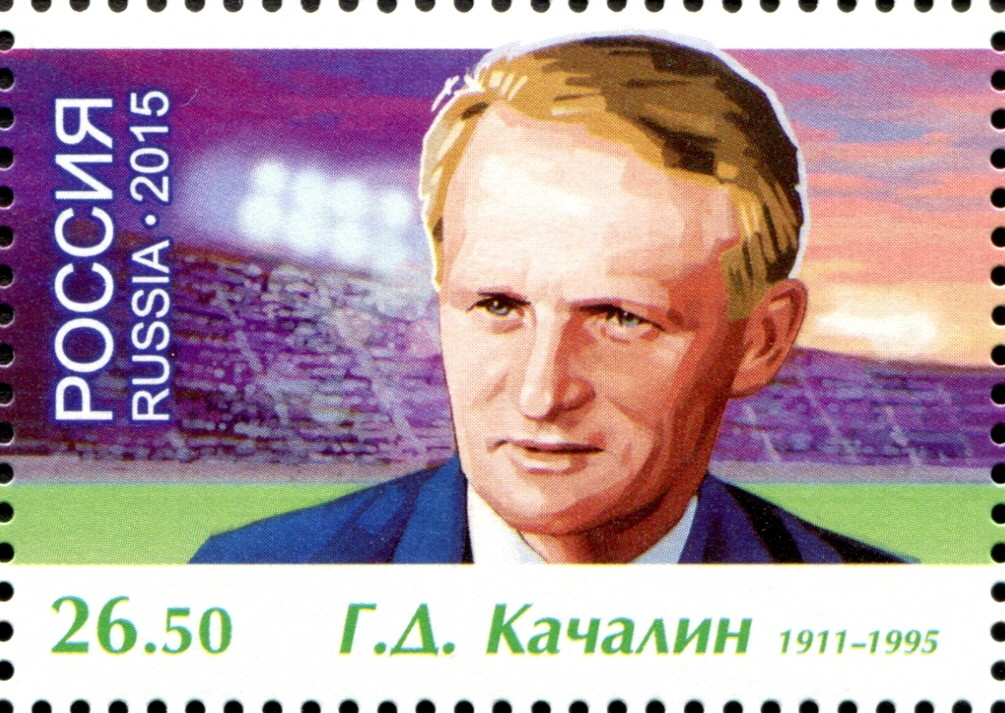
Kachalin on a 2015 Russian stamp from the series "Football Legends"

=== As player ===
Dynamo Moscow

- Soviet Top League (2): 1937, 1940
- Soviet Cup (1): 1937

=== As manager ===
Dinamo Tbilisi

- Soviet Top League (1): 1964; Bronze Medal (2): 1971, 1972

Dynamo Moscow

- Soviet Top League Bronze Medal (1): 1973

Soviet Union

- UEFA European Championship (1): 1960
- Summer Olympic Games (1): 1956

Moscow XI

- Spartakiad of the Peoples of the USSR (1): 1956

== Awards ==
- Honored Master of Sports of the USSR
- Merited Coach of the USSR
- Order of Friendship of Peoples
- Order of the Red Banner of Labour
