= 1937 Soviet Second League B =

Soviet football league season

This season the league was split into additional two tiers Group G and Group D. The Group D had also two subgroup. Next season all of those tiers and extra subgroups will be combined into the single All-Soviet Super League.

== League standings ==
=== Group G ===
The highest scoring games were between Burevestnik Moscow and Stal Dnipropetrovsk ending in 9:0, Traktor Stalingrad - Torpedo Gorky 7:2, and Frunze Plant - Torpedo Gorky 6:3.

Pos	Republic	Team	Pld	W	D	L	GF	GA	GD	Pts
1	Russian SFSR	FC Traktor Stalingrad	11	8	2	1	40	14	+26	29
2	Russian SFSR	DKA Smolensk	11	8	1	2	30	12	+18	28
3	Russian SFSR	FC Krylya Sovetov Moscow	11	6	3	2	28	19	+9	26
4	Russian SFSR	FC Burevestnik Moscow	11	6	1	4	33	20	+13	24
5	Azerbaijan SSR	FC Dinamo Baku	11	5	2	4	24	15	+9	23
6	Ukrainian SSR	FC Frunze Plant Kostiantynivka	11	6	0	5	23	25	−2	23
7	Russian SFSR	FC Kirov's Plant Leningrad	11	5	2	4	15	19	−4	23
8	Uzbek SSR	FC Dinamo Tashkent	11	4	3	4	16	21	−5	22
9	Ukrainian SSR	FC Stal Dnipropetrovsk	11	3	4	4	20	27	−7	21
10	Russian SFSR	FC Torpedo Gorky	11	2	2	7	19	34	−15	16 (Note: The Torpedo Gorky was docked a point as it refused to play against the Tashkent team.)
11	Azerbaijan SSR	PFC Neftchi Baku	11	2	1	8	14	31	−17	16
12	Armenian SSR	FC Spartak Yerevan	11	0	1	10	6	31	−25	10 (Note: The Yerevan's Club was docked two points for a failure to play a scheduled game against the Gorky's club and the club from Kostiantynivka.)

=== Group D ===
Pos	Republic	Team	Pld	W	D	L	GF	GA	GD	Pts
1	Russian SFSR	FC Spartak Ivanovo	10	7	1	2	21	12	+9	25
2	Ukrainian SSR	FC Lokomotyv Dnipropetrovsk	10	5	4	1	22	15	+7	24
3	Armenian SSR	FC Dinamo Yerevan	10	6	1	3	19	15	+4	23
4	Russian SFSR	FC Spartak Kalinin	10	5	3	2	14	13	+1	23
5	Russian SFSR	FC Metallurg Stalingrad	10	5	2	3	20	11	+9	22
6	Azerbaijan SSR	FC Lokomotiv Baku	10	5	0	5	17	19	−2	20
7	Russian SFSR	FC Dinamo Voronezh	10	2	4	4	8	10	−2	18
8	Russian SFSR	FC Dinamo Kirov	10	2	4	4	18	25	−7	18
9	Byelorussian SSR	FC Dinamo Minsk	10	2	3	5	20	21	−1	17
10	Ukrainian SSR	FC Sudnobudivnyk Mykolaiv	10	3	2	5	9	14	−5	17 (Note: The Sudnobudivnyk was docked a point.)
11	Ukrainian SSR	FC Spartak Kyiv	10	1	0	9	12	25	−13	12

=== Group D (cities of the East) ===
Pos	Republic	Team	Pld	W	D	L	GF	GA	GD	Pts
1	Russian SFSR	FC Dynamo Sverdlovsk	6	4	1	1	38	8	+30	15
2	Russian SFSR	FC Dynamo Cheliabinsk	6	4	1	1	23	6	+17	15
3	Kazakh SSR	FC Dinamo Alma-Ata	6	3	2	1	15	8	+7	14
4	Russian SFSR	FC Sudnostroitel Vladivostok	6	2	1	3	15	22	−7	11
5	Russian SFSR	FC Zolotoprofsoyuz Chita	6	2	0	4	11	24	−13	10
6	Russian SFSR	SKA Omsk	6	2	0	4	11	37	−26	10
7	Russian SFSR	FC Lokomotiv Krasnoyarsk	6	0	3	3	4	12	−8	9
8	Russian SFSR	FC Burevestnik Novosibirsk (Note: Burevestnik Novosibirsk and SKA Chita withdrew.)	0	0	0	0	0	0	0	0
9	Russian SFSR	SKA Chita	0	0	0	0	0	0	0	0

== See also ==
- 1937 Soviet Cup
- 1937 Group A (Soviet football championship)
- 1937 Group B (Soviet football championship)
- 1937 Group V (Soviet football championship)
