= 1936 in Soviet football =

Football in the Soviet Union
- Season: 1936

Men's football
- Group A: Dinamo Moscow (spring); Spartak Moscow (fall)
- Group B: Dinamo Tbilisi (spring); Serp i Molot Moscow (fall)
- Soviet Cup: Lokomotiv Moscow

The 1936 Soviet football championship was the 6th seasons of competitive football in the Soviet Union split into two halves. It was also the inaugural competition for the Soviet league format (round-robin) transitioning from the cities football competition format that was grandfathered from the Imperial Russian sports events.

FC Dynamo Moscow won the championship in spring and FC Spartak Moscow won it in fall. Between both championships in the summer there was held the first Soviet Cup competition.

In the fall the defending champions Dynamo were going neck-to-neck with their main rivals Spartak, but just a round away from the finish line they tied with weaker Dynamo Leningrad which costed them the title.

Krasnaya Zaria Leningrad avoided relegation from Group A in the spring, while CDKA Moscow avoided relegation in the fall.

== Honours ==
Competition	Winner (spring)	Runner-up (spring)	Winner (fall)	Runner-up (fall)
Group A	Dinamo Moscow (1*)	Dinamo Kiev	Spartak Moscow (1)	Dinamo Moscow
Group B	Dinamo Tbilisi	ZiS Moscow	Serp i Molot Moscow	Temp Baku
Group V	Dinamo Rostov-na-Donu	Stroiteli Baku	Dinamo Kazan	Spartak Kharkov
Group G	KhTZ Kharkov	Krylia Sovetov Moscow	KhTZ Kharkov	Stal Dnepropetrovsk
Soviet Cup	Winner		Runner-up	
Soviet Cup	Lokomotiv Moscow (1*)		Dinamo Tbilisi	

Notes = Number in parentheses is the times that club has won that honour. * indicates new record for competition

== Soviet Cup ==
Lokomotiv Moscow beat Dinamo Tbilisi 2–0 in the Soviet Cup final. Goals were scored by Aleksei Sokolov and Viktor Lavrov. The Georgian side was coached by a foreign head coach out of France Jules Limbeck.

== Soviet Union spring football championship ==
=== Group A ===
Pos	Team	Pld	W	D	L	GF	GA	GR	Pts	Republic
1	Dynamo Moscow	6	6	0	0	22	5	4.400	18	Russian SFSR
2	Dynamo Kiev	6	4	0	2	18	11	1.636	14	Ukrainian SSR
3	Spartak Moscow	6	3	1	2	12	7	1.714	13	Russian SFSR
4	CDKA Moscow	6	2	1	3	13	18	0.722	11	Russian SFSR
5	Lokomotiv Moscow	6	2	0	4	7	11	0.636	10	Russian SFSR
6	Dynamo Leningrad	6	1	1	4	5	12	0.417	9	Russian SFSR
7	Krasnaya Zarya Leningrad	6	1	1	4	8	21	0.381	9	Russian SFSR

Rules for classification: Classification is done by points and then goal ratio.

=== Group B ===
Pos	Republic	Team	Pld	W	D	L	GF	GA	GR	Pts	Promotion or relegation
1	Georgian SSR	Dinamo Tbilisi (P)	6	5	1	0	19	4	4.750	17	Promoted
2	Russian SFSR	Zavod imeni Stalina Moscow	6	3	1	2	10	7	1.429	13	
3	Russian SFSR	Stalinets Leningrad	6	2	3	1	9	9	1.000	13	
4	Russian SFSR	Stalinets Moscow	6	1	4	1	8	9	0.889	12	
5	Russian SFSR	Serp i Molot Moscow	6	1	2	3	7	8	0.875	10	
6	Russian SFSR	Spartak Leningrad	6	1	2	3	8	17	0.471	10	
7	Ukrainian SSR	Dinamo Dnepropetrovsk (R)	6	1	1	4	7	14	0.500	9	
8	Ukrainian SSR	Dinamo Kharkov (R)	0	-	-	-	-	-	—	0	Withdrew - results annulled

(P) Promoted; (R) Relegated

=== Group V ===
Pos	Rep	Team	Pld	W	D	L	GF	GA	GR	Pts	Promotion or relegation
1	Russian SFSR	Dynamo Rostov-na-Donu (P)	7	5	1	1	19	12	1.583	18	Promoted
2	Azerbaijan SSR	Stroiteli Baku (P)	7	4	1	2	18	10	1.800	16	
3	Ukrainian SSR	Dynamo Odessa	7	3	2	2	15	9	1.667	15	
4	Russian SFSR	Dynamo Kazan	7	3	2	2	14	15	0.933	15	
5	Georgian SSR	Lokomotivi Tbilisi	7	2	3	2	14	11	1.273	14	
6	Ukrainian SSR	Spartak Kharkiv	7	1	3	3	8	16	0.500	12	
7	Ukrainian SSR	Ugolschiki Staline	7	2	1	4	14	24	0.583	12	
8	Ukrainian SSR	Lokomotyv Kyiv (R)	7	1	1	5	7	12	0.583	10	Relegated

(P) Promoted; (R) Relegated

=== Group G ===
Pos	Republic	Team	Pld	W	D	L	GF	GA	GR	Pts
1	Ukrainian SSR	FC Traktor Plant Kharkiv	4	3	1	0	9	3	3.000	11
2	Russian SFSR	FC Krylya Sovetov Moscow	4	2	1	1	5	4	1.250	9
3	Russian SFSR	FC Dynamo Piatigorsk	4	2	0	2	11	8	1.375	8
4	Ukrainian SSR	FC Stal Dnipropetrovsk	4	2	0	2	3	5	0.600	8
5	Russian SFSR	FC Molotov Automobile Plant Gorky	4	0	0	4	5	13	0.385	3 (Note: The Gorky's Club was docked a point for a failure to play a scheduled game against the Dnipropetrovsk's club.)

=== Top goalscorers ===
Group A

- Mikhail Semichastny (Dinamo Moscow) – 6 goals

Group B

- Boris Paichadze (Dinamo Tbilisi) – 7 goals

== Soviet Union fall football championship ==
=== Group A ===
Pos	Team	Pld	W	D	L	GF	GA	GR	Pts	Republic
1	Spartak Moscow (C)	7	4	2	1	19	10	1.900	17	Russian SFSR
2	Dynamo Moscow	7	3	3	1	21	12	1.750	16	Russian SFSR
3	Dynamo Tbilisi	7	3	3	1	14	9	1.556	16	Transcaucasian SFSR
4	Lokomotiv Moscow (Note: Lokomoyiv Moscow beat Dinamo Tbilisi in the Cup final 2:0. The first Soviet Cup edition took place exactly between the spring and the fall parts of 1936 seasons.)	7	4	0	3	18	14	1.286	15	Russian SFSR
5	Krasnaya Zarya Leningrad	7	3	0	4	13	18	0.722	13	Russian SFSR
6	Dynamo Kiev	7	1	3	3	16	19	0.842	12	Ukrainian SSR
7	Dynamo Leningrad	7	1	3	3	7	15	0.467	12	Russian SFSR
8	CDKA Moscow (Note: CDKA Moscow was relegated to the Group B (second tier) for the next season, however, soon after playing only three games in the 1937 season, the team was returned to the top tier for the next 1937 season.) (R)	7	2	0	5	9	20	0.450	11	Russian SFSR

Rules for classification: Classification is done by points and then goal ratio.
(C) Champions; (R) Relegated

=== Group B ===
Pos	Republic	Team	Pld	W	D	L	GF	GA	GR	Pts	Promotion or relegation
1	Russian SFSR	Serp i Molot Moscow (P)	7	6	0	1	25	6	4.167	19	Promoted
2	Azerbaijan SSR	Temp Baku	7	5	1	1	16	7	2.286	18	
3	Russian SFSR	Stalinets Moscow	7	4	1	2	13	10	1.300	16	
4	Russian SFSR	Torpedo Moscow	7	4	0	3	11	7	1.571	15	
5	Russian SFSR	Dinamo Rostov-na-Donu	7	3	0	4	13	18	0.722	13	
6	Russian SFSR	Stalinets Leningrad	7	2	1	4	6	13	0.462	12	
7	Russian SFSR	Spartak Leningrad	6	1	2	3	8	13	0.615	9 (Note: 1 point deducted?)	
8	Ukrainian SSR	Selmash Kharkov (R)	7	0	1	6	6	24	0.250	8	Relegated

(P) Promoted; (R) Relegated

=== Group V ===
Pos	Republic	Team	Pld	W	D	L	GF	GA	GR	Pts
1	Russian SFSR	Dynamo Kazan (P)	7	5	1	1	18	9	2.000	18
2	Ukrainian SSR	Spartak Kharkiv	7	4	2	1	15	11	1.364	17
3	Ukrainian SSR	Dynamo Dnipropetrovsk	7	4	0	3	14	14	1.000	15
4	Ukrainian SSR	Dynamo Odessa	7	3	1	3	9	7	1.286	13 (Note: −1 point)
5	Georgian SSR	Lokomotivi Tbilisi	7	3	0	4	14	15	0.933	13
6	Ukrainian SSR	Ugolschiki Staline	7	3	0	4	11	14	0.786	13
7	Ukrainian SSR	Dynamo Kharkiv	7	1	3	3	6	14	0.429	12
8	Russian SFSR	Dynamo Pyatigorsk (R)	7	1	1	5	8	11	0.727	7 (Note: −3 points)

(P) Promoted; (R) Relegated

=== Group G ===
Pos	Republic	Team	Pld	W	D	L	GF	GA	GR	Pts
1	Ukrainian SSR	FC Traktor Plant Kharkiv	5	3	1	1	9	6	1.500	12
2	Ukrainian SSR	FC Stal Dnipropetrovsk	5	2	1	2	13	10	1.300	10
3	Ukrainian SSR	FC Lokomotyv Kyiv	5	1	3	1	7	6	1.167	10
4	Russian SFSR	FC Dynamo Gorky	5	2	1	2	5	6	0.833	10
5	Russian SFSR	FC Traktor Stalingrad	5	2	1	2	5	9	0.556	10
6	Ukrainian SSR	FC Frunze Plant Kostiantynivka (Note: 1 point deducted?)	5	1	1	3	3	5	0.600	7

== Republican level ==
Football competitions of union republics

- No republican-level round-robin competitions were conducted in Russian SFSR, Tajik SSR, Turkmen SSR
- No republican-level cup competitions were conducted in Russian SFSR, Tajik SSR, Uzbek SSR
- New union republics were established in 1936: Kazakh SSR and Kirgiz SSR
- Transcaucasian SFSR was dissolved into its three constituent republics

=== Football championships ===
- Ukrainian SSR – Ordzhonikidze Factory Kramatorsk (see 1936 Football Championship of the Ukrainian SSR)
- Belarusian SSR – city of Minsk (see Football Championship of the Belarusian SSR)
- Transcaucasian SFSR – unknown
- Uzbek SSR – city of Tashkent

=== Football cups ===
- Ukrainian SSR – FC Dynamo Kyiv (see 1936 Cup of the Ukrainian SSR)
- Belarusian SSR – FC Dinamo Minsk
- Transcaucasian SFSR – unknown
- Turkmen SSR – Lokomotiv Ashkhabad
