= 1937 Group B (Soviet football championship) =

Group B
- Season: 1937
- Dates: July 23 – October 18
- Champions: FC Spartak Leningrad
- Relegated: FC Dinamo Kazan
- Matches played: 42
- Goals scored: 122 (2.9 per match)
- Top goalscorer: Viktor Smagin; 7 goals
- Biggest home win: Temp 6–0 Dinamo Kz (August 13)
- Biggest away win: Dinamo Kz 2–5 Stalinets L. (August 30); Torpedo 1–4 Dinamo R/D (September 24)
- Highest scoring: Stalinets M. 5–4 Stalinets L. (October 1)

The 1937 Gruppa B was third season of the Soviet (second tier) professional football competitions.

Unlike the previous season that was split into two halves, this one was played as a double round-robin among seven teams. The tournament was won by Spartak Leningrad that according to pre-season regulation was to be promoted to the Gruppa A for 1938 season, however later arrangements for the next season were changed and all participants except for the last placed Dinamo Kazan gained promotion.

Also, after only playing 3 of its scheduled games and winning only one of them, CSKA Moscow was transferred to Gruppa A mid-season.

== Teams ==
No teams were relegated to the Gruppa B.

=== Promoted ===
One team was promoted from the 1936 Gruppa V fall tournament.

- Dinamo Kazan – (debut)

== League standings ==
Pos	Republic	Team	Pld	W	D	L	GF	GA	GR	Pts
1	Russian SFSR	Spartak Leningrad (P)	12	6	2	4	19	13	1.462	26
2	Russian SFSR	FC Dinamo Rostov-na-Donu (P)	12	6	2	4	19	14	1.357	26
3	Azerbaijan SSR	Temp Baku (P)	12	6	1	5	19	14	1.357	25
4	Russian SFSR	Stalinets Leningrad (P)	12	5	3	4	22	18	1.222	25
5	Russian SFSR	FC Stalinets Moscow (P)	12	5	3	4	16	17	0.941	25
6	Russian SFSR	FC Torpedo Moscow (P)	12	4	4	4	16	18	0.889	24
7	Russian SFSR	FC Dynamo Kazan	12	1	3	8	11	28	0.393	17
8	Russian SFSR	CDKA Moscow (Note: CDKA was returned during the season to the Soviet Top League after playing two games in the season. Their results were scratched for this League this season.)	2	1	1	0	3	2	1.500	5

(P) Promoted

== Top scorers ==
Rank	Scorer	Team	Goals (Pen.)
1	Viktor Smagin	Stalinets Leningrad	7
2	Arkadiy Amirjanov	Temp Baku	6
2	Vladimir Kuskov	Spartak Leningrad	6
4	Sergei Ivanov	Stalinets Moscow	5
4	Timofei Rudov	Dinamo Rostov-na-Donu	5
4	Yefim Semyonov	Torpedo Moscow	5
7	Ivan Bibko	Dinamo Rostov-na-Donu	4
7	Ilya Bizyukov	Spartak Leningrad	4
7	Veniamin Sarkisov	Temp Baku	4
7	Konstantin Sazonov	Stalinets Leningrad	4
7	Aleksei Shumov	Stalinets Moscow	4

== See also ==
- 1937 Soviet Cup
- 1937 Group A (Soviet football championship)
- 1937 Group V (Soviet football championship)
- 1937 Group G (Soviet football championship)
- 1937 groups D and cities of Far East
