= 1937 Soviet Second League =

Soviet football league season

1937 Soviet Second League (Group V) was the 3rd championship since organizing professional competitions in the Soviet Union.

== League standings ==
Pos	Republic	Team	Pld	W	D	L	GF	GA	GD	Pts
1	Ukrainian SSR	FC Dynamo Odessa	9	7	0	2	23	11	+12	23
2	Ukrainian SSR	FC Lokomotiv Kiev	9	6	0	3	20	13	+7	21
3	Ukrainian SSR	FC Stakhanovets Stalino	9	4	4	1	20	13	+7	21
4	Ukrainian SSR	FC Dynamo Dnepropetrovsk	9	5	1	3	18	15	+3	20
5	Ukrainian SSR	FC Traktor Kharkov	9	4	1	4	17	12	+5	18
6	Georgian SSR	FC Lokomotiv Tbilisi	9	4	0	5	27	23	+4	17
7	Ukrainian SSR	FC Spartak Kharkov	9	4	0	5	15	21	−6	17
8	Ukrainian SSR	FC Selmash Kharkov	9	3	1	5	16	29	−13	16
9	Ukrainian SSR	FC Dynamo Kharkov	9	3	0	6	20	21	−1	15
10	Russian SFSR	FC Dynamo Gorky	9	1	1	7	8	26	−18	11 (Note: -1 point?)

Source: rsssf.com

== See also ==
- 1937 Soviet Cup
- 1937 Group A (Soviet football championship)
- 1937 Group B (Soviet football championship)
- 1937 Group G (Soviet football championship)
- 1937 groups D and cities of Far East
