= 1936 Soviet Cup final =

- Event: 1936 Soviet Cup
Lokomotiv Moscow	Dinamo Tbilisi
2	0
- Date: 28 August 1936
- Venue: Dynamo Stadium, Moscow
- Referee: Nikolay Usov (Leningrad)
- Attendance: 22,000

The 1936 Soviet Cup final was a football match that took place at the Central Dynamo Stadium, Moscow on 28 August 1936. The match was the first Soviet Cup final and it was contested by Lokomotiv Moscow and Dinamo Tbilisi.

Goals from Aleksei Sokolov and Viktor Lavrov helped Lokomotiv Moscow to a 2–0 win as they won the inaugural competition.

== Background ==
The inaugural Soviet Cup competition took place in 1936. A total of 82 teams took part in the competition which was played as a single-elimination tournament over seven rounds.

== Road to the final ==
As Lokomotiv Moscow and Dinamo Tbilisi both contested the 1936 Soviet Top League, they entered the cup in the second round.

=== Lokomotiv Moscow ===
In the second round, Lokomotiv Moscow defeated Trudovaya Kommuna Kungur 7–0. In the third round, Viktor Lavrov scored the only goal of the match as Lokomotiv Moscow defeated Dynamo Kharkov. Lokomotiv Moscow then defeated Spartak Leningrad 3–0 in the fourth round. In the quarter-finals, Lokomotiv Moscow narrowly edged out Serp i Molot Kharkov 2–1. Lokomotiv Moscow then thumped Krasnaya Zarya Leningrad 5–0 in the semi-final to advance to the final.

Lokomotiv Moscow's route to the final
Round	Home team	Score	Away team
Second round	Trudovaya Kommuna Kungur	0–7	Lokomotiv Moscow
Third round	Dynamo Kharkov	0–1	Lokomotiv Moscow
Fourth round	Lokomotiv Moscow	3–0	Spartak Leningrad
Quarter-final	Lokomotiv Moscow	2–1	Serp i Molot Kharkov
Semi-final	Lokomotiv Moscow	5–0	Krasnaya Zarya Leningrad

=== Dinamo Tbilisi ===
In the second round, Mikhail Berdzenishvili scored twice as Dinamo Tbilisi defeated Dinamo Batumi 2–0. In the third round, Dinamo Tbilisi requred extra time to defeat Stroitel Baku 3–2. Dinamo Tbilisi then defeated Dzerzhinets Stalingrad 3–1 in the fourth round. In the quarter-finals, Dinamo Tbilisi and Spartak Moscow drew 3–3 and the tie was replayed. In the rematch, they again drew 3–3 in regulation time before Dinamo Tbilisi scored three more times in extra time to win 6–3. Dinamo Tbilisi then thumped Krasnoye Znamya Noginsk 5–1 in the semi-final to advance to the final.

Dinamo Tbilisi's route to the final
Round	Home team	Score	Away team
Second round	Dinamo Batumi	0–2	Dinamo Tbilisi
Third round	Dinamo Tbilisi	3–2 (a.e.t.)	Stroitel Baku
Fourth round	Dzerzhinets Stalingrad	1–3	Dinamo Tbilisi
Quarter-final	Spartak Moscow	3–3	Dinamo Tbilisi
Quarter-final replay	Spartak Moscow	3–6 (a.e.t.)	Dinamo Tbilisi
Semi-final	Dinamo Tbilisi	5–1	Krasnoye Znamya Noginsk

== Match details ==
First half goals from Aleksei Sokolov and Viktor Lavrov gave Lokomotive Moscow the advantage against Dinamo Tbilisi. There was no scoring in the second half as the Russian side defeated their Georgian counterparts to win the inaugural competition.

28 August 1936
17:00 LST

Lokomotiv Moscow	2–0	Dinamo Tbilisi
Sokolov 18'; Lavrov 24'

Dynamo Stadium, Moscow
Attendance: 22,000
Referee: Nikolay Usov (Leningrad)

Lokomotiv Moscow	FC Dinamo Tbilisi

Lokomotiv Moscow:
GK	Nikolai Razumovsky
DF	Ilya Gvozdkov
DF	Dmitriy Maksimov (c)
MF	Vitaliy Strelkov
MF	Mikhail Zhukov
MF	Nikolai Ilyin
FW	Nikolai Mikheyev
FW	Aleksei Sokolov
FW	Viktor Lavrov (substituted off)
FW	Aleksandr Semyenov
FW	Pyotr Terenkov
Substitutes:
FW	Nikolai Mikheev (substituted on)
GK	Valentin Granatkin
Manager:
(Soviet Union) Alexei Stoliarov

Dinamo Tbilisi:
GK	Aleksandr Dorokhov
DF	Shota Shavgulidze (c) (substituted off)
DF	Eduard Nikolaishvili
MF	Nikolai Anikin
MF	Vladimir Berdzenishvili
MF	Vladimir Dzhorbenadze
FW	Ilya Panin
FW	Mikhail Berdzenishvili
FW	Boris Paichadze
FW	Mikhail Aslamazov
FW	Nikolai Somov
Substitutes:
?	Substituted on
Manager:
(France) Jules Limbeck

== See also ==
- 1936 Soviet Top League
