= Anton Idzkovsky =

Ukrainian footballer, manager, and administrator

Personal information
- Date of birth: 29 December 1907
- Place of birth: Kiev, Russian Empire
- Date of death: 24 January 1995 (aged 87)
- Place of death: Kyiv, Ukraine
- Position: Goalkeeper

Senior career*
Years	Team	Apps	(Gls)
1926–27	Sovtorgsluzhashchiye		
1928–41	Dynamo Kyiv	74	
1942–43	Dynamo Kazan		
1944–45	Dynamo Kyiv	13	

International career
1934	USSR (unoff.)	1	(−1)

Managerial career
- 1946: Dynamo Kyiv
- * Club domestic league appearances and goals

Anton Leonardovych Idzkovsky (Ukrainian: Антон Леонардович Ідзковський, Polish: Anton Idzkowski) was a Soviet football and ice hockey player, goalkeeper, and later an administrator for the Football Federation of the Ukrainian SSR. He is honored as the Distinguished Master of Sports (1945) and the Distinguished Coach of Ukraine (1961).

Anton Idzkovsky was an ethnic Pole and Roman Catholic. In interview to Ukrayinskyi Futbol newspaper answering questions about rumors of the Idzkovsky's cooperation with NKVD, the former secretary of Football Federation of the Ukrainian SSR Klavdia Kirianova explained that he was cautious and never talked about his origin.

Preceded by M.Kuznetsov	Presidents of FFU; 1963–1964	Succeeded by Fedir Martynyuk
