= Sergei Ilyin =

Russian footballer

Personal information
- Full name: Sergei Ivanovich Ilyin
- Date of birth: 5 August 1968 (age 58)
- Height: 1.75 m (5 ft 9 in)
- Positions: Defender; midfielder

Senior career*
Years	Team	Apps	(Gls)
1989–1990	FC Energiya Murom		
1991	FC Volzhanin Kineshma	34	(4)
1991–1992	FC Zenit Saint Petersburg	22	(1)
1993	FC KAMAZ Naberezhnye Chelny	14	(0)
1993	→ FC KAMAZ-d Naberezhnye Chelny (loan)	1	(0)
1993–1995	FC Tekstilshchik Kamyshin	15	(1)
1995	FC Torpedo Vladimir	14	(0)
1996	FC Kovrovets Kovrov (amateur)		
1997	FC Spartak Bryansk	18	(0)
1998	FC Spartak-Telekom Shuya	6	(0)
1999	FC Kovrovets Kovrov (amateur)		
1999	FC Khopyor Balashov (amateur)		
- * Club domestic league appearances and goals

Sergei Ivanovich Ilyin (Russian: Сергей Иванович Ильин; born 5 August 1968) is a former Russian football player.
