= Viktor Dubinin =

Soviet Russian footballer and manager

Personal information
- Full name: Viktor Ivanovich Dubinin
- Date of birth: 30 September 1901
- Place of birth: Moscow, Russia
- Date of death: 25 April 1984 (aged 82)
- Place of death: Moscow, Russian SFSR
- Height: 1.81 m (5 ft 11 1/2 in)
- Position: Midfielder

Senior career*
Years	Team	Apps	(Gls)
1918–1922	SKZ Moscow		
1923–1924	FC Yakht-klub Raykomvoda Moscow		
1924–1925	Mossovet Moscow		
1926–1930	FC Tryokhgorka Moscow		
1931–1932	FC AMO Moscow		
1933–1936	FC Dynamo Moscow		

Managerial career
- 1937: FC Dynamo Moscow
- 1938: FC Dynamo Moscow (assistant)
- 1939: FC Dynamo Moscow
- 1950–1951: FC Dynamo Moscow
- * Club domestic league appearances and goals

Viktor Ivanovich Dubinin (Russian: Виктор Иванович Дубинин; born 30 September 1901 in Moscow; died 25 April 1984 in Moscow) was a Soviet Russian football player and manager who had success coaching FC Dynamo Moscow.

== Honours as a manager ==
- Soviet Top League champion with FC Dynamo Moscow: 1937.
- Soviet Cup winner with FC Dynamo Moscow: 1937.
- Soviet Top League silver with FC Dynamo Moscow: 1950.
