= Aksel Vartanyan =

Aksel Tatevosovich Vartanyan (Russian: Аксель Татевосович Вартанян; born January 8, 1938) is a Soviet and Russian journalist and sports historian from Tbilisi.

== Career ==
Vartanyan graduated from the Historical-Philological Department of the Tbilisi Pedagogical Institute. Since 1962, he has worked full-time as a school teacher.

He is best known as a journalist for the Football weekly and the newspaper Sport Express, as well as for his research in archives and other written stock-piles that accumulated since the inception of domestic club football.

== Bibliography ==
- History of USSR Championships 1936-1979 "Futbol" Moscow 1994-98
- Eduard Streltsov - criminal or victim? "Terra-sport", Moscow 2001 (ISBN 9785931271163)
- Secret Archive "Sport-Express" (2001)
  - Under the Red Banner of Sportintern (October 1, 2001)
  - Eastern novel (October 15, 2001)
  - Not so scary is demon (October 22, 2001)
  - Difficult road to "Double-V" (October 29, 2001)
  - Women for the defenders of republic (November 5, 2001)
  - To Caesar - the Cesarean, to Kosarev - the Kosarean (November 12, 2001)
  - Football, war and diplomacy (December 10, 2001)
  - How we entered FIFA (December 17, 2001)
- Annals "Sport-Express" (2003-2017)

== See also ==
- Soviet Top League
