= Aleksandr Ponomarev (footballer, born 1918) =

Soviet footballer (1918–1973)

Oleksandr Ponomariov
Personal information
- Full name: Oleksandr Semenovych Ponomariov
- Date of birth: 23 April 1918
- Place of birth: Korsun, Ukrainian People's Republic
- Date of death: 7 June 1973 (aged 55)
- Place of death: Moscow, Russian SFSR, USSR
- Height: 1.70 m (5 ft 7 in)
- Position: Striker

Youth career
- 1933: Dynamo Horlivka

Senior career*
Years	Team	Apps	(Gls)
1936	Ugolshchiki Stalino	1	(1)
1936–1940	Traktor Stalingrad	85	(56)
1941	Profsoyuzy-1 Moscow	9	(2)
1945–1950	Torpedo Moscow	133	(83)
1951–1952	Shakhtyor Stalino	38	(19)
Total		266	(161)

Managerial career
- 1953–1956: Shakhtyor Stalino
- 1957–1958: Soviet Union (Youth team)
- 1960–1961: Avangard Kharkov
- 1962–1965: Dynamo Moscow
- 1966–1968: Upon Pallo
- 1969–1970: Ararat Yerevan
- 1971: Soviet Union (Olympic team)
- 1972: Soviet Union
Medal record
Men's football
Representing Soviet Union (as manager)
UEFA European Championship
Runner-up	1972
- * Club domestic league appearances and goals

Oleksandr Ponomariov (Russian: Александр Семёнович Пономарёв; Ukrainian: Олександр Семенович Пономарьов; 23 April 1918 – 7 June 1973) was a Soviet football player and manager.

== Career ==
Ponomarev was born in Horlivka near Donetsk, Ukrainian People's Republic. As a player, in the course of his career, he won the Soviet Cup in 1949 with Torpedo Moscow, and scored 152 goals in the Soviet Top League. He was the top scorer of the league in 1946. He spent the last two seasons of his playing career in Shakhter Stalino where he captained the team to the third place in the Soviet Top League in 1951, their highest league finish thus far.

In 1953 he started his manager career in Shakhter Stalino. He helped the club win the Soviet First League in 1954 (earning them promotion back to the top league).

In 1960–1961 he managed Avangard Kharkov, under him the club finished 6th in the Soviet Top League in 1961, their highest league finish thus far.

In 1962 he was made the manager of Dynamo Moscow, which finished 11th in the previous season, and which he led to a victory in the Soviet Top League in 1963.

He was the head coach of the Soviet Union national team in 1972, leading the team to second place in UEFA Euro 1972, and to a bronze medal at the 1972 Olympic Games.

He died at age 55 in Moscow.
