= Vasily Smirnov (footballer) =

Russian footballer

Vasily Pavlovich Smirnov (Russian: Василий Павлович Смирнов) (18 December 1908 in Serpukhov–12 June 1987 in Serpukhov) was a Soviet footballer. From 1927 to 1930 he played for FC Moscow Presnya and from 1931 to 1939 he played for Dinamo Moscow, making 39 appearances and scoring 27 goals. He played 11 unofficial international matches for the USSR, with 4 goals. Later he coached FC Zvezda Serpukhov from 1957 to 1968.
