= Mikhail Semichastny =

Soviet footballer and coach

Personal information
- Full name: Mikhail Vasilyevich Semichastny
- Date of birth: December 5, 1910
- Place of birth: Perlovka, now part of Mytishchi, Russia
- Date of death: August 30, 1978 (aged 67)
- Place of death: Moscow, Russian SFSR
- Height: 1.74 m (5 ft 8 1/2 in)
- Position: Striker

Senior career*
Years	Team	Apps	(Gls)
1932–1935	CDKA Moscow		
1936–1950	FC Dynamo Moscow	210	(52)

Managerial career
- 1951–1953: FC Dynamo Moscow
- * Club domestic league appearances and goals

Mikhail Vasilyevich Semichastny (Russian: Михаил Васильевич Семичастный; born December 5, 1910, in Perlovka, now part of Mytishchi, Russia; died August 30, 1978, in Moscow) was a Soviet professional football player and coach.

== Honours ==
- Soviet Top League top scorer: 1936 (spring), 6 goals.
- Soviet Top League champion: 1936 (spring), 1937, 1940, 1945, 1949.
- Soviet Top League runner-up: 1936 (autumn), 1946, 1947, 1948, 1950.
- Soviet Top League bronze (as a manager): 1953.
- Soviet Cup winner: 1937.
