= 1937 Cup of the Ukrainian SSR =

Kubok Ukrainy

Tournament details
- Country: Ukrainian SSR
- Teams: 39

Final positions
- Champions: FC Dynamo Kyiv
- Runners-up: FC Dynamo Odessa

Tournament statistics
- Matches played: 37
- Goals scored: 165 (4.46 per match)

The 1937 Ukrainian Cup was the second season of a football knockout competition conducting by the Football Federation of the Ukrainian SSR.

Same as the last year the tournament was known as the Spring Challenge of the UkrSSR (Ukrainian: Весняна першість УСРР, Vesnyana prshist USRR; Russian: II весеннее первенство УССР, II vesenneye pervenstvo USSR) or the Spring championship. However soon after the start, Ukrainian mass media started to call it the Cup competition. The tournament was conducted from 24 April to 18 May 1937.

== Competition schedule ==
=== First Round ===
FC Dynamo Chernihiv	3:1	Balytskyi Komuna Pryluki
FC Dynamo Kryvyi Rih	–:+	FC Lokomotyv Yasynuvata	4:3 (score annulled)
FC Spartak Vinnytsia	3:0	FC Dynamo Mohyliv-Podilskyi
FC Lokomotyv Dnipropetrovsk	3:1	Libknekht Factory Dnipropetrovsk
FC Stalinets Kharkiv	4:1	Petrovskyi Factory Kharkiv
FC Zdorovia Kharkiv	3:2	FC Lokomotyv Kharkiv
FC Vympel Kyiv	2:3	FC Zenit Kyiv

=== Second Round ===
FC Stal Dnipropetrovsk	3:2	FC Lokomotyv Kyiv
FC KhTZ Kharkiv	9:1	FC Lokomotyv Odessa
FC Dynamo Odessa	4:1	FC Kryla Rad Zaporizhia
KinAp Factory Odessa	2:4	FC Dynamo Kyiv
FC Dynamo Chernihiv	1:4	FC Silmash Kharkiv
Marti Factory Mykolaiv	3:0	FC Zdorovia Kharkiv
Ordzhonikidze Factory Kramatorsk	3:0	FC Zenit Kyiv
Voroshylov Factory Voroshylovsk	1:2	FC Dynamo Dnipropetrovsk
FC Zenit Stalino	1:2	FC Spartak Kharkiv
FC Stakhanovets Sergo	+:–	FC Lokomotyv Yasynuvata	(did not appear)
FC Lokomotyv Zaporizhia	5:2	Komintern Factory Kharkiv
FC Dzerzhynets Voroshylovhrad	3:1	UDKA Kiev
FC Lokomotyv Dnipropetrovsk	1:3	FC Dynamo Kharkiv
FC Stal Dniprodzerzhynsk	2:1	Frunze Factory Kostiantynivka
FC Stalinets Kharkiv	1:3	FC Spartak Kyiv
FC Spartak Vinnytsia	0:3	FC Stakhanovets Stalino

=== Third Round ===
Marti Factory Mykolaiv (V)	3:4	(I) FC Dynamo Kyiv
FC Lokomotyv Zaporizhia (R)	0:4	(III) FC Dynamo Odessa
FC Dynamo Dnipropetrovsk (III)	3:2	(III) FC KhTZ Kharkiv
FC Spartak Kharkiv (III)	4:0	(R) FC Stakhanovets Sergo
FC Stakhanovets Stalino (III)	2:1	(R) FC Dzerzhynets Voroshylovhrad
FC Dynamo Kharkiv (III)	4:1	(IV) FC Stal Dnipropetrovsk
FC Stal Dniprodzerzhynsk (R)	3:6	(V) FC Spartak Kyiv
FC Silmash Kharkiv (III)	1:2	(R) Ordzhonikidze Factory Kramatorsk

=== Quarterfinals ===
Ordzhonikidze Factory Kramatorsk (R)	0:1	(I) FC Dynamo Kyiv
FC Dynamo Odessa (III)	3:1	(III) FC Stakhanovets Stalino
FC Dynamo Dnipropetrovsk (III)	4:2	(III) FC Spartak Kharkiv
FC Dynamo Kharkiv (III)	3:1	(V) FC Spartak Kyiv

=== Semifinals ===
FC Dynamo Kyiv (I)	8:0	(III) FC Dynamo Dnipropetrovsk
FC Dynamo Odessa (III)	2:0	(III) FC Dynamo Kharkiv

=== Final ===
18 May 1937 (Tuesday)

FC Dynamo Kyiv (I)	4–2 (a.e.t.)	(III) FC Dynamo Odessa
Klymenko 35' (own); Honcharenko 53'; Shylovskyi 68'; Makhynia 94', 103'		Oryekhov 65' (pen.)

Balytskyi Dynamo Stadium
Attendance: 25,000
Referee: Ioselevych (Kharkiv)

Dynamo Kyiv:
GK	?	(Ukrainian Soviet Socialist Republic) Mykola Trusevych
	?	(Ukrainian Soviet Socialist Republic) Vasyl Pravoverov
	?	(Ukrainian Soviet Socialist Republic) Oleksiy Klymenko
	?	(Ukrainian Soviet Socialist Republic) Fedir Tyutchev	(substituted off) 46'
	?	(Ukrainian Soviet Socialist Republic) Iosif Lifshyts
	?	(Ukrainian Soviet Socialist Republic) Ivan Kuzmenko
	?	(Ukrainian Soviet Socialist Republic) Makar Honcharenko
	?	(Ukrainian Soviet Socialist Republic) Viktor Shylovskyi
	?	(Ukrainian Soviet Socialist Republic) Konstantin Shchegotsky (c)
	?	(Ukrainian Soviet Socialist Republic) Pavlo Komarov
	?	(Ukrainian Soviet Socialist Republic) Mykola Makhynia
Substitutes:
	?	(Ukrainian Soviet Socialist Republic) Mykola Korotkykh	(substituted on) 46'
Manager:
(Ukrainian Soviet Socialist Republic) Mikhail Tovarovsky

Dynamo Odessa:
GK	?	(Ukrainian Soviet Socialist Republic) Oleksandr Mykhalchenko
MF	?	(Ukrainian Soviet Socialist Republic) Mykhailo Volin
DF	?	(Ukrainian Soviet Socialist Republic) Mykola Tabachkovskyi
DF	?	(Ukrainian Soviet Socialist Republic) Mykola Khyznikov
MF	?	(Ukrainian Soviet Socialist Republic) Mykhailo Kheison
MF	?	(Ukrainian Soviet Socialist Republic) Volodymyr Tokar
FW	?	(Ukrainian Soviet Socialist Republic) Mark Hychkin	(substituted off) 68'
FW	?	(Ukrainian Soviet Socialist Republic) Mykhailo Malkhasov
FW	?	(Ukrainian Soviet Socialist Republic) Leonid Oryekhov
MF	?	(Ukrainian Soviet Socialist Republic) Heorhiy Borysevych
FW	?	(Ukrainian Soviet Socialist Republic) Jozef Sosicki
Substitutes:
FW	?	(Ukrainian Soviet Socialist Republic) Petro Kalashnikov	(substituted on) 68'
Manager:
(Ukrainian Soviet Socialist Republic) German Blank

== Top goalscorers ==
Scorer	Goals	Team
(Ukrainian Soviet Socialist Republic)	?	

Ukrainian Cup 1937 Winners

FC Dynamo Kyiv
First title

== See also ==
- Soviet Cup
- Ukrainian Cup
