= 1936 Cup of the Ukrainian SSR =

Kubok Ukrainy

Tournament details
- Country: Ukrainian SSR
- Teams: 8

Final positions
- Champions: FC Dynamo Kyiv
- Runners-up: FC Dynamo Odessa

Tournament statistics
- Matches played: 8
- Goals scored: 29 (3.63 per match)

The 1936 Ukrainian Cup was a football knockout competition conducting by the Football Federation of the Ukrainian SSR.

Originally the tournament was known as the Spring Challenge of the Ukrainian SSR (Ukrainian: Весняна першість УСРР, Vesnyana Pershist USRR; Russian: I весеннее первенство УССР, I vesenneye pervenstvo USSR) or the Spring championship. It was conducted from 11 May to 24 June 1936. Unlike a round robin tournament that was conducted usually later in August, this tournament was conducted as a knockout competition (also known the Olympic system).

The decision about organizations of games and general structure was approved on 20–21 April at plenum of the All-Ukrainian football section, a predecessor of the Football Federation of Ukraine). According to later witnessing of referee Ivan Myronov, the tournament was not finished as the plan provided the competition would continue until all places from first to eight will be assigned.

== Competition schedule ==
=== First Round ===
FC KhPZ Kharkiv (IV)	0:1	(III) FC Lokomotyv Kyiv
FC Dynamo Kyiv (I)	5:2	(II) FC Dynamo Dnipropetrovsk
FC Stakhanovets Horlivka (III)	2:3	(III) FC Dynamo Odessa
FC Dynamo Kharkiv (II)	0:2	(IV) Lenin Factory Dnipropetrovsk

=== Semifinals ===
FC Dynamo Kyiv (I)	2:1	(III) FC Lokomotyv Kyiv
FC Dynamo Odessa (III)	1:0	(IV) Lenin Factory Dnipropetrovsk

=== Consolation tournament ===
FC Dynamo Dnipropetrovsk (II)	3:1	(IV) FC KhPZ Kharkiv
FC Stakhanovets Horlivka (III)	+:–	(II) FC Dynamo Kharkiv	(refused)

=== Final ===
24 June 1936 (Wednesday)

FC Dynamo Kyiv (I)	6–0	(III) FC Dynamo Odessa
Shylovskyi 7', 23', 53'; Shchegodsky 56'; Korotkykh (?)		Tokar (?)

Balytskyi Dynamo Stadium
Attendance: 35,000
Referee: Romanenko (Kharkiv)

Dynamo Kyiv:
GK	?	(Ukrainian Soviet Socialist Republic) Mykola Trusevych
	?	(Ukrainian Soviet Socialist Republic) Vasyl Pravoverov
	?	(Ukrainian Soviet Socialist Republic) Oleksiy Klymenko
	?	(Ukrainian Soviet Socialist Republic) Fedir Tyutchev
	?	(Ukrainian Soviet Socialist Republic) Ivan Kuzmenko
	?	(Ukrainian Soviet Socialist Republic) Mykhailo Putystin
	?	(Ukrainian Soviet Socialist Republic) Makar Honcharenko
	?	(Ukrainian Soviet Socialist Republic) Viktor Shylovskyi
	?	(Ukrainian Soviet Socialist Republic) Konstantin Shchegotsky (c)
	?	(Ukrainian Soviet Socialist Republic) Pavlo Komarov	(substituted off) 56'
	?	(Ukrainian Soviet Socialist Republic) Mykola Makhynia
Substitutes:
	?	(Ukrainian Soviet Socialist Republic) Mykola Korotkykh	(substituted on) 56'
Manager:
(Ukrainian Soviet Socialist Republic) Mikhail Tovarovsky

Dynamo Odessa:
GK	?	(Ukrainian Soviet Socialist Republic) Oleksandr Mykhalchenko
MF	?	(Ukrainian Soviet Socialist Republic) Petro Chystov	(substituted off) 46'
DF	?	(Ukrainian Soviet Socialist Republic) Mykola Tabachkovskyi
DF	?	(Ukrainian Soviet Socialist Republic) Mykola Khyznikov
MF	?	(Ukrainian Soviet Socialist Republic) Mykhailo Kheison
MF	?	(Ukrainian Soviet Socialist Republic) Volodymyr Tokar
FW	?	(Ukrainian Soviet Socialist Republic) Mark Hychkin
FW	?	(Ukrainian Soviet Socialist Republic) Mykhailo Malkhasov
FW	?	(Ukrainian Soviet Socialist Republic) Leonid Oryekhov
MF	?	(Ukrainian Soviet Socialist Republic) Mykola Kravchenko
FW	?	(Ukrainian Soviet Socialist Republic) Jozef Sosicki
Substitutes:
MF	?	(Ukrainian Soviet Socialist Republic) Mykhailo Melnyk	(substituted on) 46'
Manager:
(Ukrainian Soviet Socialist Republic) Aron Kohen

== Top goalscorers ==
Scorer	Goals	Team
(Ukrainian Soviet Socialist Republic)	?	

Ukrainian Cup 1936 Winners

FC Dynamo Kyiv
First title

== See also ==
- 1936 Football Championship of the Ukrainian SSR
- 1936 Soviet Cup
