= List of FC Dynamo Kyiv managers =

List of all managers of Ukrainian football club Dynamo Kyiv.

== Managers ==
- Figures correct as of ______. Includes all competitive matches

* Player-manager
+ Caretaker manager
M = Matches played; W = Matches won; D = Matches drawn; L = Matches lost; F = Goals for; A = Goals against

Name	Nationality	From	To	M	W	D	L	F	A	Win%	Honours	Notes
Mikhail Tovarovsky	Soviet Union	1936	1937	29	12	9	8	67	54	41%	Soviet Top League runners-up (1936)	
Volodymyr Fomin	Soviet Union	1938	1938	25	15	6	4	76	35	60%		
Mykhailo Pechenyi	Soviet Union	1939	1940									
Mikhail Butusov	Soviet Union	1940	1941									
Mykola Makhynya	Soviet Union	1944	1945									
Lev Korchebokov	Soviet Union	1945	1946									
Boris Apukhtin	Soviet Union	1946	1946									
Konstantin Shegodsky	Soviet Union	1947	1947	24	9	9	6	27	21	38%		
Mikhail Sushkov	Soviet Union	1948	1948	26	7	6	13	32	50	27%		
Mykhailo Okun	Soviet Union	1949	1949	34	17	6	11	48	47	50%		
Yevgeni Fokin	Soviet Union	1950	1950									
Oleh Oshenkov	Soviet Union	1951	1956								Soviet Top League runners-up (1952), Soviet Cup (1954 Soviet Cup)	
Viktor Shylovsky	Soviet Union	1956	1958									
Vyacheslav Solovyov	Soviet Union	1959	1962								Soviet Top League (1961)	
Viktor Terentyev	Soviet Union	1963	1963									
Victor Maslov	Soviet Union	1964	1970								Soviet Top League (1966, 1967, 1968), Soviet Cup (1964, 1966)	
Alexander Sevidov	Soviet Union	1971	1973								Soviet Top League (1971), Soviet Cup runners-up (1973)	
Valery Lobanovsky	Soviet Union	1973	1982								Cup Winners' Cup (1974-75),1975 European Supercup European Cup semifinals (1976-77), Soviet Top League (1974, 1975, 1977, 1980, 1981), Soviet Cup (1974, 1978, 1982)	
Yury Morozov	Soviet Union	1983	1984									
Valery Lobanovsky	Soviet Union	1984	1990								Cup Winners' Cup (1985-86), European Cup semifinals (1986-87), Soviet Top League (1985, 1986), Soviet Cup (1985, 1987)	
Anatoliy Puzach	Ukraine	1990	1993								European Cup semifinal group (1991-92), Soviet Top League (1990), Soviet Cup (1990)	
Mykhailo Fomenko	Ukraine	1993	1993								Ukrainian Premier League (1992-93), Ukrainian Cup (1992–93)	
Yozhef Sabo	Ukraine	1993	1996								Ukrainian Premier League (1993-94, 1995-96), Ukrainian Cup (1995–96)	
Mykola Pavlov	Ukraine	1994	1995								Ukrainian Premier League (1994-95)	
Valery Lobanovsky	Ukraine	1997	May 2002								Ukrainian Premier League (1996-97, 1997-98, 1998-99, 1999-2000, 2000-01), Ukrainian Premier League runners-up (2001-02), Ukrainian Cup (1997–98, 1998–99, 1999-00), CIS Cup (1997, 1998, 2002) CIS Cup runners-up (1999)	
Oleksiy Mykhaylichenko	Ukraine	May 2002	August; 2004								Ukrainian Premier League (2002-03, 2003-04), Ukrainian Cup (2002–03), Ukrainian Super Cup (2004)	
Yozhef Sabo	Ukraine	2004	2005								Ukrainian Cup (2004-05)	
Leonid Buryak	Ukraine	2005	2005									
Anatoly Demyanenko	Ukraine	2005	September; 2007								Ukrainian Premier League (2005-06), Ukrainian Cup (2005-06, 2006-07), Ukrainian Super Cup (2006, 2007)	
Yozhef Sabo	Ukraine	September; 2007	November; 2007									
Oleh Luzhnyi+	Ukraine	November; 2007	December; 2007	8	4	0	4	12	14	50%		
Yuri Semin	Russia	December; 2007	26 May 2009	68	48	11	9	145	52	71%	Ukrainian Premier League (2008-09) runners-up (2007-08), Ukrainian Cup runners-up (2007-08)	
Valery Gazzaev	Russia	26 May 2009	1 October 2010	58	35	13	10	101	46	60%	Ukrainian Super Cup (2009), Ukrainian Premier League runners-up (2009-10)	
Oleh Luzhnyi+	Ukraine	1 October 2010	23 December 2010	14	9	3	2	29	12	64%		
Yuri Semin	Russia	24 December 2010	24 September 2012								Ukrainian Super Cup (2011)	
Aleksandr Khatskevich+	Belarus	24 September 2012	25 September 2012									
Oleksiy Mykhaylichenko+	Ukraine	5 October 2012	31 October 2012									
Oleh Blokhin	Ukraine	25 September 2012	16 April 2014									
Serhii Rebrov	Ukraine	17 April 2014	31 May 2017								Ukrainian Premier League (2014–15, 2015–16), Ukrainian Cup (2013–14, 2014–15), Ukrainian Super Cup (2016)	
Aleksandr Khatskevich	Belarus	2 June 2017	14 August 2019								Ukrainian Super Cup (2018, 2019)	
Oleksiy Mykhaylichenko	Ukraine	15 August 2019	20 July 2020								Ukrainian Cup (2019-20)	
Mircea Lucescu	Romania	23 July 2020	3 November 2023	43	28	8	7	79	35		Ukrainian Premier League (2021), Ukrainian Cup (2021)	
Oleksandr Shovkovsky	Ukraine	4 November 2023	December 2025								Ukrainian Premier League (2025)	
Ihor Kostyuk	Ukraine	December 2025										
