= 1938 in Soviet football =

Football in the Soviet Union
- Season: 1938

Men's football
- Group A: Spartak Moscow
- Soviet Cup: Spartak Moscow

The 1938 Soviet football championship was the 8th seasons of competitive football in the Soviet Union. FC Spartak Moscow won the championship becoming the winner of Group A for the second time.

== Honours ==
Competition	Winner	Runner-up
Group A	Spartak Moscow (2)	CDKA Moscow
Soviet Cup	Spartak Moscow (1)	Elektrik Leningrad

Notes = Number in parentheses is the times that club has won that honour. * indicates new record for competition

== Organization ==
The football competitions were conducted by the All-Union Committee on sports and physical culture under the rules adopted in 1937 and 1938. Competitions were conducted among team of masters of four categories of sports societies: the Workers-Peasants Red Army team (CDKA), trade union sports societies (16), the Order of Lenin sports society "Dynamo" (6), the Order of Lenin sports society "Spartak" (3).

The competitions followed its playing calendar adopted by the Central sports inspection. All societies were mandated to provide a grass turf field for games that corresponds to requirements presented by the international rules with corresponding equipment on the field: locker rooms for players and office space for referees. Each team was mandated to have no more than 25 players on its roster. Additional players or replacing players could be added no less than 10 days before a game and had to be approved by the Central sports inspection. If a team would field a player who is not on the approved roster, that team despite the outcome of game receives a loss and their opponents a win. For teams that participate in the Championship have the right to play all fizkulturniks (athletes) who are members of the corresponding sports society. Servicing of the Championship by the referee staff is entrusted to the All-Union Judging Panel.

The championship winner is awarded the All-Union Committee banner. Beside players, certificates, tokens and premiums are also given to nachalnik komandy (team's chief), politruk (political officer), and coach.

All teams are obligated to play the season's calendar to the end. A withdrawn team would be barred from the 1939 season. Points that were received in games with the withdrawn team are zeroed. Players of the withdrawn team cannot play for other collectives to the end of the season's calendar.

On equal points for two or more teams, additional games would be conducted in a single round-robin format to determine the order of their places.

Protests about the improperly played game are submitted by team's official representative to the Central Sports Inspection no later than 24 hours after the game either personally or by telegraph and simultaneously to the game's referee, and representative of the opposing team. All replay games must be finished by end of the season's calendar.

Ejected from the field players for disciplinary fouls automatically miss one game and furthermore until the Central Sport Inspection decision are barred to play. In case of a rough evil-minded play, they are subject to criminal liability.

Organization that would host a team for a match are obligated to provide footballs of corresponding size and weight according to the rules; in case of football availability of the visiting team, the match is conducted by a better ball deemed by a referee. The stadium administration is obligated on the referee's request provide scales, measuring tape, calipers to measure a ball, turf fields and goal posts.

It was mandated that the stadium entrance fee would be no more than 2 rubles, side seats no more than 3 rubles, center seats no more than 5 rubles. For every game there also should be allocated 10% of preferential tickets for the price of no more than 1 ruble for the Red Army servicemembers and students. The visiting team has a right to receive 50 free tickets.

Two teams that place the last league's table position will leave the competition and won't participate in the 1939 season. Two teams that showed good technique results, in competitions of Soviet Cup, republican or city championships, friendlies with the best team of the Union, may be allowed in the 1939 season among demonstration teams.

== Soviet Cup ==
Spartak Moscow beat Elektrik Leningrad 3–2 in the Soviet Cup final. The decisive goal was scored by Viktor Semyonov.

== Soviet Union football championship ==
Pos	Republic	Team	Pld	W	D	L	GF	GA	GR	Pts
1	Russian SFSR	Spartak Moscow	25	18	3	4	74	19	3.895	39
2	Russian SFSR	CDKA Moscow	25	17	3	5	52	24	2.167	37
3	Russian SFSR	Metallurg Moscow	25	16	5	4	57	29	1.966	37
4	Ukrainian SSR	Dynamo Kiev	25	15	6	4	30	24	1.250	36
5	Russian SFSR	Dynamo Moscow	25	14	4	7	69	34	2.029	32
6	Georgian SSR	Dynamo Tbilisi	25	11	9	5	53	38	1.395	31
7	Russian SFSR	Dynamo Leningrad	25	12	6	7	52	32	1.625	30
8	Russian SFSR	Lokomotiv Moscow	25	12	6	7	44	37	1.189	30
9	Russian SFSR	Torpedo Moscow	25	9	11	5	51	38	1.342	29
10	Ukrainian SSR	Dynamo Odessa	25	9	11	5	39	35	1.114	29
11	Ukrainian SSR	Stakhanovets Stalino	25	11	7	7	55	50	1.100	29
12	Russian SFSR	Traktor Stalingrad	25	12	3	10	53	48	1.104	27
13	Russian SFSR	Elektrik Leningrad	25	8	8	9	42	44	0.955	24
14	Russian SFSR	Stalinets Leningrad (Note: Stalinets Leningrad merged with Zenit in 1939.)	25	7	10	8	38	57	0.667	24
15	Ukrainian SSR	Silmash Kharkiv (R)	25	8	6	11	34	45	0.756	22
16	Russian SFSR	Stalinets Moscow (R)	25	8	5	12	36	44	0.818	21
17	Ukrainian SSR	Lokomotyv Kiev (R)	25	8	5	12	43	64	0.672	21
18	Russian SFSR	Dynamo Rostov-na-Donu (R)	25	7	6	12	39	43	0.907	20
19	Azerbaijan SSR	Temp Baku (R)	25	6	8	11	33	40	0.825	20
20	Russian SFSR	Spartak Leningrad (R)	25	6	8	11	30	39	0.769	20
21	Ukrainian SSR	Spartak Kharkiv (R)	25	5	7	13	43	63	0.683	17
22	Russian SFSR	Zenit Leningrad (R)	25	7	3	15	35	57	0.614	17
23	Russian SFSR	Pishchevik Moscow (R)	25	5	6	14	25	53	0.472	16
24	Georgian SSR	Lokomotiv Tbilisi (R)	25	5	5	15	44	62	0.710	15
25	Russian SFSR	Krylia Sovetov Moscow (R)	25	4	7	14	28	56	0.500	15
26	Russian SFSR	Burevestnik Moscow (R)	25	4	4	17	28	87	0.322	12

Source: rsssf.com
(R) Relegated

=== Top goalscorers ===
Group A

- Makar Honcharenko (Dinamo Kiev) – 20 goals

== Republican level ==
Football competitions of union republics

=== Football championships ===
- Azerbaijan SSR – Lokomotiv Baku
- Armenian SSR – Spartak Yerevan
- Belarusian SSR – Dinamo Minsk (see Football Championship of the Belarusian SSR)
- Georgian SSR – Dinamo Batumi
- Kazakh SSR – Dinamo Alma-Ata
- Kirgiz SSR – Dinamo Frunze
- Russian SFSR – none
- Tajik SSR – none
- Turkmen SSR – Dinamo Ashkhabad (spring), Lokomotiv Ashkhabad (fall)
- Uzbek SSR – Spartak Tashkent
- Ukrainian SSR – Dzerzhinets Voroshilovgrad (see 1938 Football Championship of the Ukrainian SSR)

=== Football cups ===
- Azerbaijan SSR – Temp Baku
- Armenian SSR – none
- Belarusian SSR – none
- Georgian SSR – none
- Kazakh SSR – Dinamo Alma-Ata
- Kirgiz SSR – Dinamo Frunze
- Russian SFSR – none
- Tajik SSR – Dinamo Stalinabad
- Turkmen SSR – Lokomotiv Ashkhabad
- Uzbek SSR – none
- Ukrainian SSR – Dynamo Kyiv (see 1938 Cup of the Ukrainian SSR)
