= Spartak Chernihiv =

- Full name: Спартак Чернігів
- Nickname(s): Спартак (Чернігів)
- Founded: 1938
- Dissolved: (Defunct)
- Ground: Sports complex, Museum, 4., Chernihiv, Chernihiv Oblast, Ukraine
Home colours	Away colours

The Spartak Chernihiv (Ukrainian: Спартак Чернігів) was a Ukrainian football club from Chernihiv, Ukraine established in 1938, during the Soviet Union. The team used to play at the Spartak's sports complex, located in Chernihiv at Museyna vulytsia, 4. It is located next to the Ancient Chernihiv historic site.

== History ==
=== Origin ===
The "Spartak" sports society in Chernihiv was established sometime early in the 20th century. Until the German–Soviet War (1941–1945), Spartak Chernihiv played at the republican level in the Ukrainian football championship, second and third tiers. In 1938, so happened that Spartak Chernihiv took part in the 1938 Soviet Cup, because qualification rounds of the Soviet Cup also served for the same qualification rounds of the Ukrainian Cup (1938). During that cup competition, Spartak Chernihiv started in Group 15, also known as the Kyiv Group. In the group's quarterfinals, Spartak Chernihiv was granted a technical win over another Spartak football team from Korosten, proceeding to the group's semifinals. At the semifinals, Spartak Chernihiv was visiting Vodnyk Kyiv and lost the game 0:2.

In 1940, Spartak won the Ukrainian football championship, third group (third tier).

After the war, Spartak was reestablished in 1949. It continued to play at the republican level.

Also playing in the cups URSR 1939, 1940, 1949, 1951 and 1964 rock_v. In 1964 the rotsi chernigivska team showed their best result in the tourney. In the first one, “Spartak” won (2: 1) “Gvardiya” (Romney), and in the second one, it sacrificed (0: 3) to the Terniv Avangard. The team was formed over the course of the year.

== Honours ==
=== All-Union competitions ===
- Soviet Cup
  - participation: 1938 (group semifinals)

=== Republican competitions ===
- Football Cup of the Ukrainian SSR
  - participation: 1938 (group semifinals), 1939 (Round of 32), 1940 (preliminary round), 1949 (preliminary round)
- Ukrainian championship, Group 3:
  - Winners: 1940

== League and cup history ==
Season	Div.	Pos.	Pl.	W	D	L	GS	GA	P	Ukrainian Cup	Other Cup	Notes
1937	Ukraine 2nd tier											withdrew after Round 1
1938	Ukraine 2nd tier	4	5	2	0	3	10	14	9			
1939	Ukraine 3rd tier	4	4	2	0	2	9	8	8			
1940	Ukraine 3rd tier	1	3	3	0	0	8	5	9			

== Notable players ==
- (Soviet Union) Andriy Protsko
- (Soviet Union) Valeriy Kravchynskyi

== See also ==
- List of Chernihiv Sport Teams
- FC Desna Chernihiv
- FC Desna-2 Chernihiv
- FC Desna-3 Chernihiv
- SDYuShOR Desna
- Yunist Chernihiv
- Lehenda Chernihiv
