= Championship of cities (Ukrainian SSR) =

Defunct football competition

Championship of the Ukrainian SSR among cities teams (Ukrainian: Чемпіонати УРСР для команд міст) was a football competition of the Ukrainian SSR before the formal establishing of the Soviet Union. The competition lost its importance with introduction of the Soviet Top League (All Soviet competitions Group A) in 1936 being converted to a regional championship of sports societies and departments.

Until transfer of capital of Ukraine from Kharkiv to Kiev in 1934, the Kharkiv city team was the winner almost every season expect of one. Sometimes at that time frame the western Ukraine became involved in league competitions that were established in Poland in 1927, Polish Football League (1927–1939).

== Winners ==
Season	Group	Champion	Runner-up	3rd Position
1921		Kharkiv	Odessa	?
1922		Kharkiv	Odessa	?
1923		Kharkiv	Yuzivka	?
1924		Kharkiv	Odessa	Donbas
1927		Kharkiv	Mykolaiv	Odessa
1928		Kharkiv	Horlivka	Mykolaiv
1931		Kyiv	Kharkiv	?
1932		Kharkiv	Donbas	Dnipropetrovsk
1934		Kharkiv	Kyiv	
1935		Dnipropetrovsk	Kyiv	Kharkiv

== Results by year ==
1921. Final tournament (Kharkiv)

Quarterfinals

- Kharkiv - Kherson 5:0
- Tahanroh - Kiev 1:0
- Odessa - Katerynoslav 5:1
- Mykolaiv - Poltava 7:0

Semifinals

- Kharkiv - Tahanroh 2:1
- Odessa - Mykolaiv 1:0

Final

- Kharkiv - Odessa 2:1

Kharkiv: Vinnykov, Levin, Natarov, Shpakovsky, Bem, Bizyayev, Alfyorov, Kapustin, Varzhenynov, Makeyev, Ordin, Kazakov, Romanenko, Lazunenko.

1922. Final tournament (Kharkiv)

Quarterfinals

- Kharkiv - Katerynoslav 2:0
- Kiev - Poltava 3:0
- Odessa - Crimea +:-
- Mykolaiv - Druzhkivka 2:1

Semifinals

- Kharkiv - Mykolaiv 4:0
- Odessa - Kiev 5:2

Final

- Kharkiv - Odessa 1:0

Kharkiv: Romanenko, Kolotukhin, Natarov, Shpakovsky, Romatovsky, Privalov, Bandurin, Kapustin, Varzhenynov, Krotov, Kazakov.

1923. Final tournament (Kharkiv)

Group 1

- Kharkiv - Mykolaiv +:-
- Odessa - Kiev +:-

Group finals

- Kharkiv - Odessa 1:0

Group 2

- Druzhkivka - Poltava 5:1
- Crimea - Katerynoslav 2:1

Group finals

- Druzhkivka - Crimea 2:0

Group 3

- Yuzovka - Chernihiv +:-
- Vinnytsia - Zhytomyr 2:1

Group finals

- Yuzovka - Vinnytsia 8:0

Semifinal

- Yuzivka - Druzhkivka 1:0

Final

- Kharkiv - Yuzovka 1:1, 5:1 (replay)

1924. Final tournament (Kharkiv)

Preliminaries

- Stalino - Katerynoslav 5:0
- Odessa - Podillya +:-
- Kharkiv - Poltava 1:0
- Kiev - Chernihiv +:-

Final tournament (Kiev forfeited)

- Kharkiv - Donbas 2:0
- Kharkiv - Odessa 1:0
- Odessa - Donbas 6:1

Final group. 1) Kharkiv, 2) Odessa, 3) Donbas
Kharkiv: Norov, Krotov, K. Fomin, Privalov, V. Fomin, Kapustin, Kazakov, Alfyorov, Natarov, Shpakovsky, Kostykov, Us, Vinnykov, Bem, Hrushyn, Hubaryev.

1925-1926. ?
1927. Final tournament (Kharkiv)

A mass tournament with participation of some 41 teams took place. To the finals qualified Katerynoslav, Odessa, Mykolaiv, and Stalino. To the finals were also allowed Kharkiv and Kadiyevka, although they were defeated by Mykolaiv and Stalino, respectively.

#	Club	Win	Draw	Loss	Goals	Points
1	Kharkiv	4	1	0	24-5	9
2	Mykolaiv	4	0	1	14-14	8
3	Odessa	3	1	1	13-5	7
4	Dnipropetrovsk	1	0	4	13-17	2
5	Kadiyevka	0	1	4	4-14	1
6	Stalino	0	1	4	2-15	1

Games

- Kharkiv: Mykolaiv 10:2, Odessa 1:1, Dnipropetrovsk 4:2, Kadiyevka 4:0, Stalino 5:0
- Mykolaiv: Odessa 2:1, Dnipropetrovsk 5:3, Kadiyevka 3:0, Stalino 2:0
- Odessa: Dnipropetrovsk 4:0, Kadiyevka 3:1, Stalino 4:1
- Dnipropetrovsk: Kadiyevka 4:3, Stalino 4:1
- Kadiyevka: Stalino 0:0

Kharkiv: Kravchenko, Kladko, Krotov, K.Fomin, Privalov, V.Fomin, Semenov, Lesny, Andreyev, Natarov, Shpakovsky, Myshchenko, Us, Sorokin, Bem, M.Fomin, Hubaryev.

1928. Final tournament (Kharkiv)

There were 30 teams participating in the qualifiers.

#	Club	Win	Draw	Loss	Goals	Points
1	Kharkiv	3	0	0	9-3	6
2	Horlivka	1	1	1	4-5	3
3	Mykolaiv	1	0	2	4-4	2
4	Dnipropetrovsk	0	1	2	2-7	1

Games

- Kharkiv: Horlivka 3:1, Mykolaiv 2:1, Dnipropetrovsk 4:1
- Horlivka: Mykolaiv 2:1, Dnipropetrovsk 1:1
- Mykolaiv: Dnipropetrovsk 2:0

Kharkiv: Norov, Kladko, Moskvin, K.Fomin, Privalov, V.Fomin, Semenov, Volodymyrsky, Alfyorov, Kapustin, Shpakovsky, Myshchenko, Hubaryev.

1929-1930. ?
1931. Final tournament (Kiev)

Quarterfinals

- Kiev - Dnipropetrovsk 4:0
- Kadiyevka - Horlivka 2:1
- Stalino - Kharkiv 2:6
- Mykolaiv - Odessa 3:2

Semifinals

- Kiev - Kadiyevka 3:1
- Kharkiv - Mykolaiv 5:2

Final

- Kiev - Kharkiv 3:1

Kiev: Idzkovsky, Denysov, Vesen'yev, Dolhov, Piontkowski, Tyutchev, Sadovsky, Korotkykh, Schultz-Serdyuk, Malkhasov, Svyrydovsky.

1932. Final tournament (Dnipropetrovsk / Zaporizhia)

Preliminaries

- Stalino - Moldavian Autonomy 17:0
- Kharkiv - Stalino +:-
- Dnipropetrovsk - Odessa Region +:-
- Vinnytsia - Kiev 3:1

#	Club	Win	Draw	Loss	Goals	Points
1	Kharkiv	2	0	1	11-3	4
2	Donbas	2	0	1	8-7	4
3	Dnipropetrovsk	1	0	2	4-11	2
4	Vinnytsia	1	0	2	5-7	2

Games

- Kharkiv: Donbas 4:1, Dnipropetrovsk 6:0, Vinnytsia 1:2
- Donbas: Dnipropetrovsk 4:1, Vinnytsia 3:2
- Dnipropetrovsk: Vinnytsia 3:1

1933. Holodomor
1934.

Quarterfinals

- Kiev - Dnipropetrovsk 6:0
- Moldavian Autonomy - Vinnytsia 0:7
- Khakriv - Chernihiv 10:2
- Odessa - Donbas 5:2

Semifinals

- Vinnytsia - Kiev 0:4
- Kharkiv - Odessa 7:0

Final

- Kiev - Kharkiv 0:1

Kharkiv: Moskvin, Kyryllov, K.Fomin, M.Fomin, V.Fomin, Shvedov, Kulykov, Lesny, Zub, Parovyshnykov, Privalov.

1935. Group 1

#	Club	Win	Draw	Loss	Goals	Points
1	Dnipropetrovsk	2	1	1	9-6	9
2	Kiev	2	1	1	8-6	9
3	Kharkiv	1	2	1	7-8	8
4	Odessa	1	1	2	5-6	7
5	Stalino	1	1	2	5-8	7

Games

- Dnipropetrovsk: Kiev 3:3, Kharkiv 1:2, Odessa 2:1, Stalino 3:0
- Kiev: Kharkiv 3:2, Odessa 1:0, Stalino 0:1
- Kharkiv: Odessa 1:1, Stalino 2:2
- Odessa: Stalino 3:2

Dnipropetrovsk: Makhovsky, Hutaryev, Aleksopolski, Chyzhov, Belov, V.Kryvosheyev, Butenko, Hreber, Andreyev, Borodin, Bily, Laiko, Korchanynov, Kornylov, Zabuha, Shpynyov, P.Kryvosheyev, Starostin

1936. (part of the Cup of the Ukrainian SSR)

Quarterfinals

- Dynamo Kyiv - Dynamo Dnipropetrovsk 5:2
- KhTZ Kharkiv - Lokomotyv Kyiv 0:1
- Stakhanovets Stalino - Dynamo Odessa 2:3 (in Horlivka)
- Dynamo Kharkiv - ZiL Dnipropetrovsk 0:2

Semifinals

- Dynamo Kyiv - Lokomotyv Kyiv 2:1
- Dynamo Odessa - ZiL Dnipropetrovsk 1:0

Final

- Dynamo Kyiv - Dynamo Odessa 6:0

Dynamo Kyiv: Trusevych, Pravoverov, Klymenko, Tyutchev, Kuzmenko, Putystin, Honcharenko, Shylovsky, Shehodsky, Komarov, Korotkykh, Makhynya. Coach: Moisei Tovarovsky.

== Performance by club ==
Team	Winners	Runners-up	Years
Kharkiv	8	1	1921, 1922, 1923, 1924, 1927, 1928, 1932, 1934
Kiev	1	2	1931
Dnipropetrovsk	1	0	1935
Odessa	0	3	
Donbas (Horlivka)	0	2	
Stalino	0	1	
Mykolaiv	0	1	
