= 1938 Cup of the Ukrainian SSR =

Tournament details
- Teams: 99

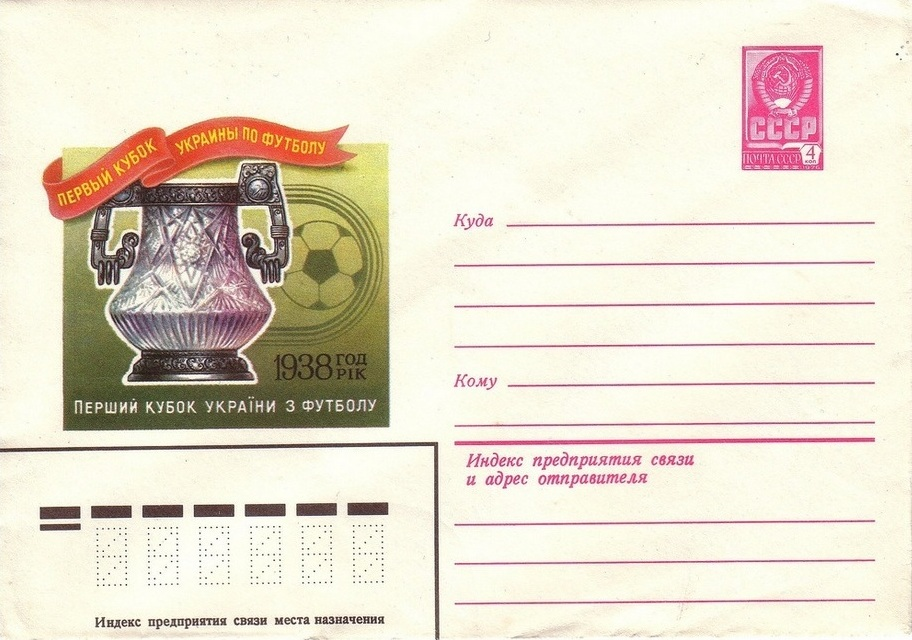

The 1938 Ukrainian Cup was a football knockout competition conducting by the Football Federation of the Ukrainian SSR and was known as the Ukrainian Cup.

On 11 April 1938 newspaper "Radianskyi sport" (Soviet Sport) informed that sports inspection of the government committee in physical culture and sports reviewed and adopted regulation of the "URSR Cup" (Ukrainian Cup) competition of football, which at the same time is a regional competition of the 1938 "USSR Cup" (Soviet Cup).

== Teams ==
1. Avanhard Druzhkivka
2. Avanhard Horlivka
3. Avanhard Kharkiv
4. Avanhard Kramatorsk
5. Avanhard Stalino
6. Avanhard Sumy
7. Avtomotor Kharkiv
8. Azot Nova Horlivka
9. Azot Shostka
10. Blyskavka Kharkiv
11. Budivelnyk Dniprodzerzhynsk
12. Budivelnyk Kryvyi Rih
13. Burevisnyk Krasnyi Luch
14. Burevisnyk Kryvyi Rih
15. Burevisnyk Stalino
16. DKA Korosten
17. Dynamo Dnipropetrovsk
18. Dynamo Kharkiv
19. Dynamo Kyiv
20. Dynamo Mohyliv-Podilskyi
21. Dynamo Mykolaiv
22. Dynamo Odesa
23. Dynamo Poltava
24. Dynamo Vinnytsia
25. Dynamo Zhytomyr
26. Dynamo-2 Kyiv
27. Dzerzhynets Kremenchuk
28. Dzerzhynets Voroshylovhrad
29. Kanatnyi zavod Kharkiv
30. Kharchovyk Kherson
31. Kharchovyk Odesa
32. Koksokhimichnyi zavod Makiivka
33. Kolyormet Zaporizhia
34. Kryla Rad Berdyansk
35. Kryla Rad Zaporizhia
36. Lokomotyv Dnipropetrovsk
37. Lokomotyv Kharkiv
38. Lokomotyv Konotop
39. Lokomotyv Kotovsk
40. Lokomotyv Kyiv
41. Lokomotyv Lozova
42. Lokomotyv Odesa
43. Lokomotyv Poltava
44. Lokomotyv Sloviansk
45. Lokomotyv Synelnykove
46. Lokomotyv Voznesensk
47. Lokomotyv Yasynuvata
48. Lokomotyv Zaporizhia
49. Lokomotyv-2 Kyiv
50. Metalist Kharkiv
51. Rot-Front Kyiv
52. Rot-Front Poltava
53. Ruda Kryvyi Rih
54. Shakhta No.30 Rutchenkove
55. Shakhtar Stalino
56. Silmash Kharkiv
57. Silmash Kirovo
58. Silmash Zaporizhia
59. Silmash-2 Kharkiv
60. Spartak Chernihiv
61. Spartak Dnipropetrovsk
62. Spartak Kharkiv
63. Spartak Korosten
64. Spartak Kyiv
65. Spartak Poltava
66. Spartak Starobilsk
67. Spartak Sumy
68. Spartak Tiraspol
69. Stakhanovets Chystiakove
70. Stakhanovets Horlivka
71. Stakhanovets Krasnoarmiysk
72. Stakhanovets Krasnyi Luch
73. Stakhanovets Lysychansk
74. Stakhanovets Ordzhonikidze
75. Stakhanovets Sergo
76. Stal Dniprodzerzhynsk
77. Stal Dnipropetrovsk
78. Stal Kostiantynivka
79. Stal Kryvyi Rih
80. Stal Makiivka
81. Stal Stalino
82. Stal Voroshylovsk
83. Stalinets Kharkiv
84. Sudnobudivnyk Mykolaiv
85. Tekhnikum FK Dnipropetrovsk
86. Tekhnikum FK Kyiv
87. Temp Vinnytsia
88. Traktor Kharkiv
89. Tsukrovyk Sumy
90. Tsukrovyky Karlivka
91. Vodnyk Kherson
92. Vodnyk Kyiv
93. Zavod imeni Kominterna Dnipropetrovsk
94. Zavod imeni Lenina Krasnohorivka
95. Zavod imeni Libknekhta Dnipropetrovsk
96. Zdorovya Kharkiv
97. Zenit Kharkiv
98. Zenit Kyiv
99. Zenit Stalino
100. Znannia Kherson

== Competition schedule ==
=== Zonal (regional) stage ===
==== Group preliminary round ====
The main date for games was on 5 May 1938, replays took place next day on 6 May.

Traktor Kharkiv	+/-	Lokomotyv Poltava
Spartak Sumy	1:0	Tsukrovyky Karlivka
Stalinets Kharkiv	4:0	Kanatnyi zavod Kharkiv
Silmash-2 Kharkiv	0:2	Avtomotor Kharkiv
Stakhanovets Lysychansk	0:4	Avanhard Horlivka	3:0 (interrupted, replayed)
Spartak Starobilsk	0:3	Zenit Stalino
Azot Nova Horlivka	1:2	Burevisnyk Stalino
Lokomotyv Yasynuvata	1:2	Zavod imeni Lenina Krasnohorivka
Stakhanovets Chystiakove	3:2	Avanhard Druzhkivka
Stakhanovets Sergo	-/+	Burevisnyk Krasnyi Luch
Lokomotyv Sloviansk	3:4	Avanhard Kramatorsk
Avanhard Kramatorsk	4:2	Stakhanovets Krasnoarmiysk
Avanhard Stalino	2:3	Shakhta No.30 Rutchenkove
Stal Makiivka	1:0	Stal Stalino
Dzerzhynets Voroshylovhrad	0:6	Stal Kostiantynivka	(played on 6 May)

==== Zonal (regional) quarterfinals ====
The main date for games was on 10 May 1938.

Traktor Kharkiv	5:1	Spartak Sumy
Avanhard Sumy	1:5	Blyskavka Kharkiv
Rot-Front Poltava	0:1	Avanhard Kharkiv
Dynamo Kharkiv	-/+	Zdorovya Kharkiv
Lokomotyv Kharkiv	1:0	Dynamo Poltava
Spartak Poltava	0:1	Tsukrovyk Sumy
Zenit Kharkiv	4:1	Metalist Kharkiv
Stalinets Kharkiv	4:1	Avtomotor Kharkiv
Lokomotyv Konotop	+/-	DKA Korosten
Zenit Kyiv	5:3	Temp Vinnytsia
Lokomotyv-2 Kyiv	4:2	Rot-Front Kyiv
Spartak Kyiv	1:2	Tekhnikum FK Kyiv
Dynamo Vinnytsia	1:2	Vodnyk Kyiv	1:1 (replay on 11 May)
Spartak Chernihiv	+/-	Spartak Korosten
Azot Shostka	1:10	Dynamo-2 Kyiv
Dynamo Zhytomyr	+/-	Dynamo Mohyliv-Podilskyi	1:1 (annulled)
Burevisnyk Kryvyi Rih	+/-	Lokomotyv Kotovsk	3:3 (a.e.t.)
Lokomotyv Odesa	4:0	Ruda Kryvyi Rih
Kharchovyk Kherson	0:4	Dynamo Mykolaiv
Budivelnyk Kryvyi Rih	1:3	Stal Kryvyi Rih
Dzerzhynets Kremenchuk	4:0	Spartak Tiraspol
Silmash Kirovo	2:1	Znannia Kherson
Sudnobudivnyk Mykolaiv	8:0	Vodnyk Kherson
Kharchovyk Odesa	3:1	Lokomotyv Voznesensk
Stal Dniprodzerzhynsk	7:0	Tekhnikum FK Dnipropetrovsk
Stal Dnipropetrovsk	1:3	Silmash Zaporizhia
Spartak Dnipropetrovsk	3:0	Kryla Rad Zaporizhia
Kryla Rad Berdyansk	0:5	Dynamo Dnipropetrovsk
Budivelnyk Dniprodzerzhynsk	0:4	Zavod imeni Libknekhta Dnipropetrovsk
Kolyormet Zaporizhia	5:3	Zavod imeni Kominterna Dnipropetrovsk
Lokomotyv Zaporizhia	3:2	Lokomotyv Dnipropetrovsk
Lokomotyv Lozova	6:1	Lokomotyv Synelnykove
Stal Kostiantynivka	8:0	Stakhanovets Chystiakove
Burevisnyk Stalino	3:1	Zavod imeni Lenina Krasnohorivka
Zenit Stalino	12:0	Burevisnyk Krasnyi Luch
Avanhard Kramatorsk	2:0	Avanhard Horlivka
Shakhta No.30 Rutchenkove	0:4	Stal Makiivka
Stakhanovets Krasnyi Luch	1:3	Avanhard Kramatorsk
Stal Voroshylovsk	2:3	Stakhanovets Ordzhonikidze
Koksokhimichnyi zavod Makiivka	2:5	Stakhanovets Horlivka

==== Zonal (regional) semifinals ====
The main date for games was on 15 May 1938.

Traktor Kharkiv	+/-	Blyskavka Kharkiv
Zdorovya Kharkiv	4:3	Avanhard Kharkiv
Lokomotyv Kharkiv	1:0	Tsukrovyk Sumy
Zenit Kharkiv	3:0	Stalinets Kharkiv
Lokomotyv Konotop	1:5	Zenit Kyiv
Lokomotyv-2 Kyiv	3:0	Tekhnikum FK Kyiv
Spartak Chernihiv	1:2	Vodnyk Kyiv
Dynamo-2 Kyiv	3:1	Dynamo Zhytomyr
Lokomotyv Odesa	4:2	Burevisnyk Kryvyi Rih
Dynamo Mykolaiv	7:0	Stal Kryvyi Rih
Silmash Kirovo	2:0	Dzerzhynets Kremenchuk
Kharchovyk Odesa	4:1	Sudnobudivnyk Mykolaiv
Stal Dniprodzerzhynsk	4:1	Silmash Zaporizhia
Spartak Dnipropetrovsk	1:0	Dynamo Dnipropetrovsk
Zavod imeni Libknekhta Dnipropetrovsk	1:2	Kolyormet Zaporizhia
Lokomotyv Zaporizhia	8:1	Lokomotyv Lozova
Burevisnyk Stalino	0:7	Stal Kostiantynivka
Avanhard Kramatorsk	3:1	Stakhanovets Ordzhonikidze
Zenit Stalino	4:0	Stakhanovets Horlivka
Stal Makiivka	2:3	Avanhard Kramatorsk	(a.e.t.)

==== Zonal (regional) finals ====
The main date for games was on 20 May 1938.

Traktor Kharkiv	0:1	Zdorovya Kharkiv
Lokomotyv Kharkiv	3:0	Zenit Kharkiv
Lokomotyv-2 Kyiv	3:2	Zenit Kyiv
Dynamo-2 Kyiv	2:1	Vodnyk Kyiv
Dynamo Mykolaiv	3:0	Lokomotyv Odesa
Kharchovyk Odesa	+/-	Silmash Kirovo
Spartak Dnipropetrovsk	4:2	Stal Dniprodzerzhynsk
Lokomotyv Zaporizhia	4:2	Kolyormet Zaporizhia
Avanhard Kramatorsk	3:2	Avanhard Kramatorsk
Stal Kostiantynivka	+/-	Zenit Stalino	0:0 (replay for 21 May)

=== Winners of zonal (regional) stage ===
Winners of zonal (regional) stage qualified for the Round of 64 (1/32) of the Soviet Cup as well as Round of 32 (1/16) Ukrainian Cup final stage.

- Group 1 (Kharkiv): Zdorovya Kharkiv, Lokomotyv Kharkiv
- Group 2 (Kyiv): Lokomotyv-2 Kyiv, Dynamo-2 Kyiv
- Group 3 (Odesa): Dynamo Mykolaiv, Kharchovyk Odesa
- Group 4 (Dnipropetrovsk): Spartak Dnipropetrovsk, Lokomotyv Zaporizhia
- Group 5 (Donbas): Avanhard Kramatorsk, Stal Kostiantynivka

=== Final stage ===
For the Ukrainian Cup final stage qualified 10 winners of the zonal (regional) stage and 6 exhibition teams out of the 1938 Soviet Top League (Dynamo Kyiv, Dynamo Odesa, Shakhtar Stalino, Lokomotyv Kyiv, Silmash Kharkiv, Spartak Kharkiv).

==== First elimination round ====
Dynamo Odesa	3:1	Lokomotyv-2 Kyiv	3:1 (first game played on 24 May and was protested), (second gamed played on 13 June)
Dynamo Mykolaiv	2:1	Spartak Dnipropetrovsk	(played on 24 May)
Avanhard Kramatorsk	0:5	Silmash Kharkiv	(played on 25 May)
Spartak Kharkiv	-/+	Dynamo-2 Kyiv	(expected to be played on 25 May, forfeited)
Stal Kostiantynivka	2:0	Kharchovyk Odesa	(played on 30 May)
Stakhanovets Stalino	6:1	Lokomotyv Zaporizhia	(played on 31 May)
Lokomotyv Kyiv	3:2	Lokomotyv Kharkiv	(played on 2 June)
Dynamo Kyiv	4:1	Zdorovya Kharkiv	(played on 17 June)

==== Quarterfinals ====
Dynamo-2 Kyiv	2:3	Stal Kostiantynivka	(played on 11 June)
Lokomotyv Kyiv	4:3	Silmash Kharkiv	(played on 15 June)
Dynamo Mykolaiv	1:2	Dynamo Odesa	2:2 (first game played on 26 June in Odesa and protested), (second game played on 21 July in Mykolaiv)
Dynamo Kyiv	3:2	Stakhanovets Stalino	(played on 9 August)

==== Semifinals ====
Stal Kostiantynivka	2:4	Lokomotyv Kyiv	(played on 12 September)
Dynamo Kyiv	4:0	Dynamo Odesa	(played on 12 October)

=== Final ===
15 October 1938
16:00

Dynamo Kyiv	3–1	Lokomotyv Kyiv
Laiko 27', 76'; Shylovsky 84'		Shatskiy 73'

Yezhov Dynamo Stadium, Kyiv
Attendance: 15,000
Referee: Chornobylskyi (Kyiv)

== Top goalscorers ==
Scorer	Goals	Team
(Ukrainian Soviet Socialist Republic)	?	

Ukrainian Cup 1938 Winners

FC Mashynobudivnyk Kyiv
Second title

== See also ==
- 1938 Football Championship of the Ukrainian SSR
- Soviet Cup
- Ukrainian Cup
