= 1936 Football Championship of the Ukrainian SSR =

Football Championship of UkrSSR
- Season: 1936
- Dates: 12 September – 18 October
- Champions: Ordzhonikidze Factory Kramatorsk

The 1936 Football Championship of UkrSSR were part of the 1936 Soviet republican football competitions in the Soviet Ukraine.

== Persha Hrupa ==
Pos	Team	Pld	W	D	L	GF	GA	GR	Pts	Qualification or relegation	ORK	PDP	DKA	KAO	STA	KEM
1	z-d im. Ordzhonikidze	4	4	0	0	10	2	5.000	12		—	2–0	3–0	5–2	+/-	
2	z-d im. Petrovskoho (P)	4	3	0	1	2	2	1.000	10	Promoted		—	1–0	1–0	+/-	0–0
3	UDKA Kiev (W)	4	2	0	2	5	5	1.000	8	Withdrew after the season			—	5–1	+/-	
4	z-d KinAp Odesa (W)	4	1	0	3	7	12	0.583	6	Withdrew after the season				—	4–1	
5	z-d im. Stalina (W)	4	0	0	4	1	4	0.250	1 (Note: 3 points deducted for no show)	Withdrew after the season					—	
6	KhEMZ Kharkiv (W)	0	0	0	0	0	0	—	0	Withdrew, but later returned						—

(P) Promoted; (W) Withdrew

== Druha Hrupa ==
1/4 finals

- Mykolaiv (Note: team of the Black Sea Shipyard) — Horlivka (Note: based on the local Dynamo team) 3 : 1
- Kadiivka (Note: team of the local mining society) — Voroshylovhrad (Note: team of the local Steam locomotive factory) 3 : 4
- Zaporizhia (Note: team of the local Krylia Sovetov team) — Kostiantynivka (Note: based on the local Stal team) + : -
- Vinnytsia (Note: team of the local regional council) — Chernihiv (Note: based on the local Dynamo team) 4 : 1

1/2 finals

- Mykolaiv (Note: team of the Black Sea Shipyard) — Voroshylovhrad (Note: team of the local Steam locomotive factory) 4 : 0
- Zaporizhia (Note: team of the local Krylia Sovetov team) — Vinnytsia (Note: team of the local regional council) + : - (Note: the game at first ended 2 : 1, but later the result was annulled and replaced with technical result)

the 3rd place game

- Voroshylovhrad (Note: team of the local Steam locomotive factory) — Vinnytsia (Note: team of the local regional council) 1 : 0

the final game

- Mykolaiv (Note: team of the Black Sea Shipyard) — Zaporizhia (Note: team of the local Krylia Sovetov team) 2 : 0

Notes:

- Kostiantynivka was admitted to the All-Union competition and therefore Zaporizhia received bye.

== Tretia Hrupa ==
1/4 finals

- Dniprodzerzhynsk — Kherson 3 : 0
- Kupyansk — Artemivsk 6 : 0
- Kryvyi Rih — Poltava 6 : 1
- Kamianets-Podilsk — Zhytomyr 4 : 3

1/2 finals

- Dniprodzerzhynsk — Kupyansk 4 : 0
- Kryvyi Rih — Kamianets-Podilsk 5 : 1

the 3rd place game

- Kupyansk — Kamianets-Podilsk + : - (no show)

the final game

- Dniprodzerzhynsk — Kryvyi Rih 4 : 1

Notes:

- Artemivsk withdrew after the season.

== Chetverta Hrupa ==
1/8 finals

- Starobilsk — Voroshylovsk 0 : 2
- Makiivka — Melitopol + : - (no show)
- Berdychiv — Korosten + : -
- Kremenchuk — Kirovo 7 : 4
- Ordzhonikidze — Postysheve + : - (no show)
- Chystiakove — Krasnyi Luch 2 : 1

1/4 finals

- Voroshylovsk — Makiivka 2 : 1
- Sumy — Berdychiv 5 : 2
- Mohyliv-Podilskyi — Kremenchuk 2 : 1
- Ordzhonikidze — Chystiakove 6 : 0

1/2 finals

- Voroshylovsk — Sumy 3 : 1
- Mohyliv-Podilskyi — Ordzhonikidze 2 : 1

the 3rd place game

- Sumy — Ordzhonikidze + : - (no show)

the final game

- Voroshylovsk — Mohyliv-Podilskyi 3 : 1.

== Ukrainian clubs at the All-Union level ==
The Ukrainian SSR was presented with 11 teams of masters (exhibition teams) at the All-Union level:

- Group A (1): Dynamo Kyiv
- Group B (3→1): Silmash Kharkiv, Dynamo Dnipropetrovsk (↓), Dynamo Kharkiv (↓)
- Group V (4→3) (5): Dynamo Odesa, Spartak Kharkiv, Ugolschiki Stalino, Lokomotyv Kyiv (↓)
- Group G (3) (4): Traktor Factory Kharkiv, Stal Dnipropetrovsk, Stal Kostiantynivka

== Number of teams by region ==
Number	Region	Team(s)	
Number	Region	Ukrainian SSR	All-Union
2-3-1-6 (2)	Donetsk Oblast	z-d im. Ordzhonikidze Kramatorsk, z-d im. Stalina Stalino, Voroshilovhrad, Horlvika, Kadiivka, Artemivsk, Voroshylovsk, Makiivka, Chystiakove, Starobilsk, Postysheve, Krasnyi Luch	Ugolschiki Stalino, Stal Kostiantynivka
1-1-2-1 (2)	Dnipropetrovsk Oblast	z-d im. Petrovskoho Dnipropetrovsk, Zaporizhia, Dniprodzerzhynsk, Kryvyi Rih, Ordzhonikidze, Melitopol	Dynamo Dnipropetrovsk, Stal Dnipropetrovsk
1-1-1-1 (1)	Odesa Oblast	z-d KinAp Odesa, Mykolaiv, Kherson, Kirovo	Dynamo Odesa
1-0-2-2 (4)	Kharkiv Oblast	KhEMZ Kharkiv, Kupiansk, Poltava, Sumy, Kremenchuk	Silmash Kharkiv, Dynamo Kharkiv, Spartak Kharkiv, Traktornyi z-d Kharkiv
1-0-1-2 (2)	Kyiv Oblast	UDKA Kiev, Zhytomyr, Berdychiv, Korosten	Dynamo Kyiv, Lokomotyv Kyiv
0-1-1-1 (0)	Vinnytsia Oblast	Vinnytsia, Kamianets-Podilsk, Mohyliv-Podilskyi	–
0-1-0-0 (0)	Chernihiv Oblast	Chernihiv	–
–	(Moldavian Soviet Socialist Republic) Moldavian ASSR	–	–

== See also ==
- 1936 Cup of the Ukrainian SSR
