= 1938 Soviet Cup =

1938 Cup of USSR in Football
Кубок СССР

Tournament details
- Country: Soviet Union
- Dates: May 5 – July 18 (qualification stage); July 21 – September 14 (final stage)
- Teams: Preliminary stage: 249; Final stage: 64; Total: 275

Final positions
- Champions: Spartak Moscow (1st title)
- Runners-up: Elektrik Leningrad
- Semifinalists: Dinamo Tbilisi; Dinamo Leningrad

Tournament statistics
- Top goal scorer: Boris Paichadze (Dinamo Tbilisi) – 6 goals

The 1938 Soviet Cup was an association football cup competition of the Soviet Union.

The competition was composed of qualification stage that contained several subgroups and the final stage.

26 teams of the 1938 Soviet Top League were given a bye to the final stage, while other teams were competing in 19 groups of the qualifying stage.

Teams from Ukraine were granted 10 berths within 5 groups, teams from Caucasus and Central Asian union republics were granted 3 berths in 3 groups, teams from Belarus were competing along with some teams from Russia for a single berth, while Russian teams were granted 24 berths in 10 groups with teams from Moscow region receiving 8 berths.

Competitions in qualification subgroups 14–18 (Ukrainian) were conducted as a regional competition of the 1938 Cup of the Ukrainian SSR in May 5-20.

== Participating teams ==
Enter in Final stage	Enter in Preliminary stage			
26 teams of masters	249 other teams			
teams of masters ✓ Spartak Moscow; ✓ CDKA Moscow; ✓ Metallurg Moscow; ✓ Dinamo Kiev; ✓ Dinamo Moscow; ✓ Dinamo Tbilisi; ✓ Dinamo Leningrad; ✓ Lokomotiv Moscow; ✓ Torpedo Moscow; ✓ Dinamo Odessa; ✓ Stakhanovets Stalino; ✓ Traktor Stalingrad; ✓ Elektrik Leningrad; ✓ Stalinets Leningrad; ✓ Selmash Kharkov; ✓ Stalinets Moscow; ✓ Lokomotiv Kiev; ✓ Dinamo Rostov-na-Donu; ✓ Temp Baku; ✓ Spartak Leningrad; ✓ Spartak Kharkov; ✓ Zenit Leningrad; ✓ Pischevik Moscow; ✓ Lokomotiv Tbilisi; ✓ Krylia Sovetov Moscow; ✓ Burevestnik Moscow	Moscow I (4+22) ✓ Zenit Kolomna; ✓ Zavod Gorbunova Kolomna; ✓ Lokomotiv Lyublino; ✓ Dinamo Ivanovo; ✓ Myasokombinat Mikoyana Moscow; ✓ CDKA-2 Moscow; ✓ Lokomotiv Serpukhov; ✓ Spartak Ivanovo; ✓ Lokomotiv Ryazan; ✓ Kauchuk Moscow; ✓ Fabrika Babayeva Moscow; ✓ Zenit Tula; ✓ Krasny Proletariy Moscow; ✓ v/ch #168 Ryazan; ✓ Pravda Moscow; ✓ Rodina Fryazino; ✓ Zvezda Orekhovo-Zuyevo; ✓ Kombinat Teikovo; ✓ Komvolny Kombinat Kuntsevo; ✓ Krasnoye Znamia Moscow; ✓ Krasnaya Roza Moscow; ✓ Tomna Kineshma; ✓ Spartak-2 Moscow; ✓ Lokomotiv-2 Moscow; ✓ Stalinets-2 Moscow; ✓ Sherstiannik Moscow Khabarovsk (1+4) ✓ Dinamo Khabarovsk; ✓ Stroitel Komsomolsk-na-Amure; ✓ Lokomotiv Irkutsk; ✓ Krylia Sovetov Irkutsk; ✓ Dinamo Irkutsk Povolzhye (2+9) ✓ Traktor-2 Stalingrad; ✓ Lokomotiv Kuibyshev; ✓ Krylia Sovetov Saratov; ✓ Pischevik Astrakhan; ✓ Spartak Kuibyshev; ✓ Elektrik Saratov; ✓ Vodnik Astrakhan; ✓ Zenit-221 Stalingrad; ✓ DKA Stalingrad; ✓ Dinamo Stalingrad; ✓ Lokomotiv Saratov Central Asia (1+5) ✓ Dinamo Karaganda; ✓ Spartak Tashkent; ✓ Dinamo Tashkent; ✓ Lokomotiv Tashkent; ✓ Dinamo Stalinabad; ✓ Dinamo Alma-Ata Odessa (2+14) ✓ Lokomotiv Odessa; ✓ Dzerzhinets Kremenchug; ✓ Burevestnik Krivoi Rog; ✓ Stal Krivoi Rog; ✓ SelMash Kirovo; ✓ Sudostroitel Nikolayev; ✓ Lokomotiv Kotovsk; ✓ Spartak Tiraspol; ✓ Ruda Krivoi Rog; ✓ Lokomotiv Voznesensk; ✓ Pischevik Kherson; ✓ Znaniye Kherson; ✓ Stroitel Krivoi Rog; ✓ Vodnik Kherson; ✓ Dinamo Nikolayev; ✓ Pischevik Odessa	Moscow II (4+20) ✓ Zavod imeni Frunze Moscow; ✓ Trud Krasnaya Polyana; ✓ KIM Moscow; ✓ Snaiper Podolsk; ✓ Start Moscow; ✓ Proletarskaya Pobeda Moscow; ✓ Zenit Kovrov; ✓ Krasnoye Znamia Pavlovskiy Posad; ✓ Pischevik-2 Moscow; ✓ Dinamo Lyubertsy; ✓ Zavod Geofizika Moscow; ✓ Burevestnik Tula; ✓ Snaiper Moscow; ✓ Dinamo Kalinin; ✓ MashTekhSoyuz Moscow; ✓ SelMash Lyubertsy; ✓ Dinamo-2 Moscow; ✓ Osnova Ivanovo; ✓ TsvetMet Moscow; ✓ Zavod-20 Moscow; ✓ Dinamo Bolshevo; ✓ Pravda Moscow; ✓ Zenit Podlipki; ✓ Krasnoye Znamia Noginsk Novosibirsk (1+10) ✓ Metallurg Stalinsk; ✓ DKA Omsk; ✓ Tekhnikum Fizkultury Novosibirsk; ✓ Lokomotiv Krasnoyarsk; ✓ Dinamo Krasnoyarsk; ✓ Dinamo Omsk; ✓ Lokomotiv Omsk; ✓ Lokomotiv Tyumen; ✓ Krylia Sovetov Novosibirsk; ✓ Dinamo Novosibirsk; ✓ Stroitel Novosibirsk Rostov-na-Donu (2+6) ✓ Myasokombinat Maykop; ✓ Pischevik Rostov-na-Donu; ✓ Pischevik Krasnodar; ✓ Krylia Sovetov Taganrog; ✓ Medik Krasnodar; ✓ Dinamo Krasnodar; ✓ Energiya Novocherkassk; ✓ Zenit Taganrog Belorossiya (1+5) ✓ Dinamo Smolensk; ✓ Dinamo Minsk; ✓ Spartak Gomel; ✓ KIM Minsk; ✓ Tekhnikum Fizkultury Smolensk; ✓ Spartak Minsk Dnepropetrovsk (2+14) ✓ TsvetMet Zaporozhye; ✓ Stal Dneprodzerzhinsk; ✓ Dinamo Dnepropetrovsk; ✓ SelMash Zaporozhye; ✓ ZiL Dnepropetrovsk; ✓ Lokomotiv Lozovaya; ✓ Tekhnikum FK Dnepropetrovsk; ✓ Lokomotiv Dnepropetrovsk; ✓ ZiP Dnepropetrovsk; ✓ Krylya Sovetov Berdyansk; ✓ Lokomotiv Sinelnikovo; ✓ Krylya Sovetov Zaporozhye; ✓ Stroitel Dneprodzerzhinsk; ✓ ZiK Dnepropetrovsk; ✓ Lokomotiv Zaporozhye; ✓ Spartak Dnepropetrovsk	Leningrad (4+7) ✓ GOMZ Leningrad; ✓ Krasnaya Zaria-2 Leningrad; ✓ Izhorskiy Zavod Leningrad; ✓ Kauchuk Leningrad; ✓ Zavod imeni Stalina Leningrad; ✓ Lokomotiv Vologda; ✓ Zavod imeni Ordzhonikidze Leningrad; ✓ Zavod imeni Kulakova Leningrad; ✓ Kirovsky Zavod (Avangard) Leningrad; ✓ Zavod Elektrik Leningrad; ✓ Lokomotiv Yaroslavl Sverdlovsk (2+11) ✓ Dinamo Chelyabinsk; ✓ TsvetMet Krasnouralsk; ✓ Avangard Sverdlovsk; ✓ Traktor Chelyabinsk; ✓ Dinamo Ufa; ✓ Metallurg Sverdlovsk; ✓ Zenit Votkinsk; ✓ Torpedo Izhevsk; ✓ Dinamo Kungur; ✓ Dinamo Kirov; ✓ Metallurg Magnitogorsk; ✓ Dinamo Sverdlovsk; ✓ Stroitel Sverdlovsk Trans-Caucasus (1+4) ✓ Spartak Yerevan; ✓ Pischevik Tbilisi; ✓ Spartak Leninakan; ✓ Nauka Tbilisi; ✓ Dinamo Batumi Kharkov (2+18) ✓ Zenit Kharkov; ✓ Traktor Kharkov; ✓ Stalinets Kharkov; ✓ Avtomotor Kharkov; ✓ Avangard Kharkov; ✓ Sakharniki Sumy; ✓ Molniya Kharkov; ✓ Spartak Sumy; ✓ Avangard Sumy; ✓ Rot Front Poltava; ✓ Kanatny Zavod Kharkov; ✓ Dinamo Poltava; ✓ SelMash-2 Kharkov; ✓ Spartak Poltava; ✓ Sakharniki Karlovka; ✓ Lokomotiv Poltava; ✓ Dinamo Kharkov; ✓ Metallist Kharkov; ✓ Lokomotiv Kharkov; ✓ Zdorovye Kharkov Donetsk (2+23) ✓ Zenit Stalino; ✓ ZiO Kramatorsk; ✓ Burevestnik Stalino; ✓ Stakhanovets Lisichansk; ✓ Shakhta-30 Rutchenkovo; ✓ ZiL Krasnogorovka; ✓ Stal Makeyevka; ✓ Stakhanovets Ordzhonikidze; ✓ Burevestnik Krasny Luch; ✓ Stakhanovets Krasny Luch; ✓ Stakhanovets Artemovsk; ✓ Azot Nizhnyaya Gorlovka; ✓ Avangard Stalino; ✓ Dzerzhinets Voroshilovgrad; ✓ Lokomotiv Slaviansk; ✓ Lokomotiv Yasinovataya; ✓ Spartak Starobelsk; ✓ Avangard Druzhkovka; ✓ Avangard Gorlovka; ✓ Stakhanovets Sergo; ✓ Stal Stalino; ✓ Stal Voroshilovsk; ✓ Stakhanovets Krasnoarmeisk; ✓ Stal Konstantinovka; ✓ ZiS Kramatorsk	Voronezh (1+6) ✓ Zavod imeni Voroshilova Voronezh; ✓ Dzerzhinets Bezhitsa; ✓ Spartak Voronezh; ✓ DKA Voronezh; ✓ Samolyot Tambov; ✓ Dinamo Kursk; ✓ Dinamo Voronezh Gorkiy (2+11) ✓ Dinamo Yoshkar-Ola; ✓ Dinamo Saransk; ✓ Spartak Pavlovo; ✓ Spartak Saransk; ✓ Lokomotiv Ruzayevka; ✓ Spartak Gorkiy; ✓ Krylia Sovetov Gorkiy; ✓ Lokomotiv Kazan; ✓ Elektrik Gorkiy; ✓ Metallist Pavlovo; ✓ Spartak Kazan; ✓ Dinamo Kazan; ✓ Torpedo Gorkiy South Caspiy (1+4) ✓ Neftianik Baku; ✓ Vodnik Baku; ✓ Lokomotiv Ashkhabad; ✓ Stroiteli Baku; ✓ Lokomotiv Baku Kiev (2+14) ✓ Zenit Kiev; ✓ Vodnik Kiev; ✓ Dinamo Zhitomir; ✓ Tekhnikum FK Kiev; ✓ Spartak Chernigov; ✓ Lokomotiv Konotop; ✓ Dinamo Mogilev-Podolskiy; ✓ Azot Shostka; ✓ Dinamo Vinnitsa; ✓ DKA Korosten; ✓ Rot Front Kiev; ✓ Spartak Kiev; ✓ Spartak Korosten; ✓ Temp Vinnitsa; ✓ Lokomotiv-2 Kiev; ✓ Dinamo-2 Kiev Crimea (1+4) ✓ Sudostroitel Sevastopol; ✓ Stal Kerch; ✓ Pischevik Kerch; ✓ Pischevik Simferopol; ✓ Spartak Simferopol

Source: []

Notes

- In preliminary round teams are organized based on their qualification groups. In parentheses first number indicates how many teams qualified to the next round, while the second number stands for how many teams in that group.

== Competition schedule ==
=== Preliminary stage ===
==== Group 1 (Moscow) ====
===== Subgroup 1 =====
====== Quarterfinals ======
[Jun 26] 
ZENIT Kolomna                10-0  Lokomotiv Ryazan 
[Jun 28] 
Krasnaya Roza Moskva          1-2  KAUCHUK Moskva                  [aet]
[Jun 30] 
CDKA-2 Moskva                 1-0  Krasnoye Znamya Moskva          [aet]
Kamvolny Kombinat Kuntsevo    1-3  SHERSTYANIK Moskva   
Kombinat Teikovo              2-5  STALINETS-2 Moskva 
Zvezda Orekhovo-Zuyevo        0-4  SPARTAK-2 Moskva 
Rodina Fryazino               0-1  FABRIKA BABAYEVA Moskva    
TOMNA Kineshma                3-2  Pravda Moskva 
VC-168 Ryazan                 0-8  MYASOKOMBINAT MIKOYANA Moskva  
ZAVOD GORBUNOVA Moskva        3-1  Krasny Proletariy Moskva 
Zenit Tula                    1-2  LOKOMOTIV-2 Moskva              [aet]

====== Semifinals ======
[Jul 6] 
Fabrika Babayeva Moskva       3-4  LOKOMOTIV-2 Moskva   
Kauchuk Moskva                0-6  SHERSTYANIK Moskva  
LOKOMOTIV Lyublino            w/o  Lokomotiv Ryazan 
Spartak Ivanovo               2-4  DINAMO Ivanovo   
Spartak-2 Moskva              1-1  Myasokombinat Mikoyana Moskva 
STALINETS-2 Moskva            5-3  Lokomotiv Serpukhov 
ZAVOD GORBUNOVA Moskva        3-1  CDKA-2 Moskva

====== =Semifinals replays= ======
[Jul 7] 
SPARTAK-2 Moskva              7-1  Myasokombinat Mikoyana Moskva

====== Finals ======
[Jul 12] 
Dinamo Ivanovo                1-3  SPARTAK-2 Moskva 
Lokomotiv Lyublino            3-3  Lokomotiv-2 Moskva   
SHERSTYANIK Moskva            3-1  Zavod Gorbunova Moskva 
Zenit Kolomna                 1-3  STALINETS-2 Moskva

====== =Final replays= ======
[Jul 13] 
Lokomotiv Lyublino            2-3  LOKOMOTIV-2 Moskva

===== Subgroup 2 =====
====== Quarterfinals ======
[Jun 26] 
SNIPER Podolsk                3-1  Zavod-20 Moskva 
[Jun 30] 
DINAMO Bolshevo               5-0  TsvetMet Moskva 
Osnova Ivanovo                0-6  ZIF Moskva    
PROLETARSKAYA POBEDA Moskva   w/o  Dinamo-2 Moskva 
START Moskva                  6-0  SelMash Lyubertsy 
ZAVOD GEOFIZIKA Moskva        9-0  MashTekhSoyuz Moskva 
ZENIT Kovrov                  1-0  Dinamo Kalinin 
ZENIT Podlipki                7-0  Sniper Moskva

====== Semifinals ======
[Jul 6] 
Burevestnik Tula              1-2  TRUD Krasnaya Polyana   
DINAMO Bolshevo               3-2  Zavod Geofizika Moskva 
Dinamo Lyubertsy              2-6  KIM Moskva   
FABRIKA PRAVDA Likino-Dulyovo w/o  Pishchevik-2 Moskva 
Kr Znamya Pavlovskiy Posad    0-4  KRASNOYE ZNAMYA Noginsk   
SNIPER Podolsk                5-0  Zenit Kovrov 
ZENIT Podlipki                6-0  Proletarskaya Pobeda Moskva 
ZIF Moskva                    3-0  Start Moskva

====== Finals ======
[Jul 12] 
DINAMO Bolshevo               8-0  Sniper Podolsk 
FABRIKA PRAVDA Likino-Dulyovo 5-1  KIM Moskva 
KRASNOYE ZNAMYA Noginsk       5-2  Trud Krasnaya Polyana 
ZENIT Podlipki                4-2  ZiF Moskva

==== Group 2 (Leningrad) ====
===== Semifinals =====
[Jul 8] 
IZHORSKIY ZAVOD Leningrad     3-0  ZiO Leningrad 
Lokomotiv Vologda             2-5  ZAVOD ELEKTRIK Leningrad 
ZiS Leningrad                 0-3  KIROVSKIY ZAVOD Leningrad

===== Finals =====
[Jul 12] 
Kauchuk Leningrad             1-3  ZIK Leningrad   
KIROVSKIY ZAVOD Leningrad     6-0  Izhorskiy Zavod Leningrad 
LOKOMOTIV Yaroslavl           2-1  Krasnaya Zarya-2 Leningrad 
ZAVOD ELEKTRIK Leningrad      4-3  GOMZ Leningrad

==== Group 3 (Voronezh) ====
===== Quarterfinals =====
[Jul 6] 
Dinamo Kursk                  1-2  DZERZHINETS Bezhitsa   
Samolyot Tambov               1-2  DINAMO Voronezh   
ZIV Voronezh                  3-1  DKA Voronezh

===== Semifinals =====
[Jul 12] 
DINAMO Voronezh               4-0  Spartak Voronezh 
Dzerzhinets Bezhitsa          0-2  ZIV Voronezh

===== Final =====
[Jul 18] 
DINAMO Voronezh               1-0  ZiV Voronezh

==== Group 4 (Khabarovsk) ====
===== Quarterfinals =====
[Jul 16] 
STROITEL Komsomolsk-na-Amure  5-1  Krylya Sovetov Irkutsk

===== Semifinals =====
[Jul 12] 
DINAMO Khabarovsk             7-0  Lokomotiv Irkutsk 
[Jul 30] 
DINAMO Irkutsk                3-1  Stroitel Komsomolsk-na-Amure

===== Final =====
[Aug 5] 
DINAMO Irkutsk                2-1  Dinamo Khabarovsk

==== Group 5 (Novosibirsk) ====
===== First round =====
[Jul 6] 
LOKOMOTIV Krasnoyarsk         1-0  Dinamo Novosibirsk              [aet] 
STROITEL Novosibirsk          4-2  Krylya Sovetov Novosibirsk 
TEKHNIKUM FK Novosibirsk      w/o  Lokomotiv Tyumen

===== Quarterfinals =====
[Jul 11] 
DKA Omsk                      4-2  Lokomotiv Omsk 
[Jul 12] 
Dinamo Omsk                   0-3  METALLURG Stalinsk 
STROITEL Novosibirsk          1-0  Dinamo Krasnoyarsk 
TEKHNIKUM FK Novosibirsk      2-1  Lokomotiv Krasnoyarsk

===== Semifinals =====
[Jul 18] 
METALLURG Stalinsk            5-0  Tekhnikum FK Novosibirsk 
STROITEL Novosibirsk          3-0  DKA Omsk

===== Final =====
[Jul 30] 
STROITEL Novosibirsk          4-1  Metallurg Stalinsk

==== Group 6 (Sverdlovsk) ====
===== Quarterfinals =====
[Jul 6] 
DINAMO Chelyabinsk           10-0  Metallurg Magnitogorsk 
Dinamo Kirov                  1-3  DINAMO Sverdlovsk 
Dinamo Kungur                 2-4  METALLURG Sverdlovsk    
Torpedo Izhevsk               1-3  STROITEL Sverdlovsk     
TRAKTOR Chelyabinsk           4-3  Zenit Votkinsk

===== Semifinals =====
[Jul 12] 
DINAMO Chelyabinsk            2-0  Metallurg Sverdlovsk 
STROITEL Sverdlovsk           7-1  Dinamo Ufa 
TsvetMet Krasnouralsk         1-1  Avangard Sverdlovsk 
[Jul 14] 
Traktor Chelyabinsk           0-9  DINAMO Sverdlovsk

====== Semifinals replays ======
[Jul 13] 
TSVETMET Krasnouralsk         3-1  Avangard Sverdlovsk

===== Finals =====
[Jul 18] 
DINAMO Sverdlovsk             7-1  TsvetMet Krasnouralsk 
STROITEL Sverdlovsk           3-1  Dinamo Chelyabinsk

==== Group 7 (Gorkiy) ====
===== Quarterfinals =====
[Jul 6] 
DINAMO Kazan                  4-0  Spartak Kazan 
DINAMO Saransk                4-1  Metallist Pavlovo 
Elektrik Gorkiy               1-2  SPARTAK Gorkiy   
SPARTAK Pavlovo               5-1  Lokomotiv Kazan 
TORPEDO Gorkiy                6-2  Krylya Sovetov Gorkiy

===== Semifinals =====
[Jul 12] 
DINAMO Kazan                  3-0  Spartak Gorkiy 
DINAMO Yoshkar-Ola            8-2  Lokomotiv Ruzayevka 
Spartak Saransk               0-4  DINAMO Saransk   
TORPEDO Gorkiy               10-1  Spartak Pavlovo

===== Finals =====
[Jul 18] 
Dinamo Saransk                1-9  DINAMO Kazan   
TORPEDO Gorkiy                3-0  Dinamo Yoshkar-Ola

==== Group 8 (Povolzhye) ====
===== Quarterfinals =====
[Jul 7]
ELEKTRIK Saratov              w/o  DKA Stalingrad 
PISHCHEVIK Astrakhan          w/o  Zenit-221 Stalingrad 
TRAKTOR-2 Stalingrad          1-0  Vodnik Astrakhan

===== Semifinals =====
[Jul 12] 
Elektrik Saratov              0-2  LOKOMOTIV Kuibyshev 
Lokomotiv Saratov             2-2  Krylya Sovetov Saratov 
Spartak Kuibyshev             0-2  DINAMO Stalingrad 
[Jul 13] 
Pishchevik Astrakhan          2-3  TRAKTOR-2 Stalingrad

====== Semifinals replays ======
[Jul 13] 
LOKOMOTIV Saratov             5-0  Krylya Sovetov Saratov

===== Finals =====
[Jul 18] 
Lokomotiv Kuibyshev           0-2  DINAMO Stalingrad 
LOKOMOTIV Saratov             4-3  Traktor-2 Stalingrad            [aet]

==== Group 9 (Rostov-na-Donu) ====
===== Semifinals =====
[Jul 6] 
Dinamo Krasnodar              3-4  ZENIT Taganrog                  [aet]   
ENERGIYA Novocherkassk        3-1  Medik Krasnodar 
Krylya Sovetov Taganrog       1-3  PISHCHEVIK Rostov-na-Donu   
Pishchevik Krasnodar          0-1  MYASOKOMBINAT Maykop

===== Finals =====
[Jul 12] 
ENERGIYA Novocherkassk        3-0  Pishchevik Rostov-na-Donu 
ZENIT Taganrog                4-0  Myasokombinat Maykop

==== Group 10 (Tbilisi) ====
===== Quarterfinals =====
[Jul 6] 
DINAMO Batumi                 4-1  Nauka Tbilisi

===== Semifinals =====
[Jul 12] 
Spartak Leninakan             1-2  DINAMO Batumi 
SPARTAK Yerevan               2-0  Pishchevik Tbilisi

===== Final =====
[Jul 18] 
DINAMO Batumi                 3-0  Spartak Yerevan

==== Group 11 (Baku) ====
===== Quarterfinals =====
[Jul 6] 
VODNIK Baku                   3-1  Stroiteli Baku

===== Semifinals =====
[Jul 7] 
LOKOMOTIV Baku               11-0  Lokomotiv Ashkhabad 
[Jul 8] 
Vodnik Baku                   0-4  NEFTYANIK Baku

===== Final =====
[Jul 12] 
LOKOMOTIV Baku                3-1  Neftyanik Baku

==== Group 12 (Tashkent) ====
===== Quarterfinals =====
[Jul 6] 
Dinamo Stalinabad             2-4  DINAMO Tashkent   
[Jul 12] 
DINAMO Karaganda              2-1  Lokomotiv Tashkent

===== Semifinals =====
[Jul 17] 
DINAMO Alma-Ata               5-2  Dinamo Tashkent 
DINAMO Karaganda              w/o  Spartak Tashkent

===== Final =====
[Jul 22] 
DINAMO Alma-Ata               1-0  Dinamo Karaganda

==== Group 13 (Minsk) ====
===== Quarterfinals =====
[Jul 6] 
Tekhnikum FK Smolensk         3-4  SPARTAK Minsk   
[Jul 7] 
DINAMO Smolensk               5-0  KIM Minsk

===== Semifinals =====
[Jul 12] 
Spartak Gomel                 2-4  DINAMO Smolensk   
SPARTAK Minsk                 w/o  Dinamo Minsk

===== Final =====
[Jul 18] 
SPARTAK Minsk                 1-0  Dinamo Smolensk

==== Group 14 (Kharkov) ====
===== First round =====
[May 5] 
Avangard Sumy                 1-5  MOLNIYA Kharkov 
Roth Front Poltava            0-1  AVANGARD Kharkov 
[May 6] 
Kanatny Zavod Kharkov         1-4  STALINETS Kharkov   
LOKOMOTIV Kharkov             1-0  Dinamo Poltava 
SelMash-2 Kharkov             0-2  AVTOMOTOR Kharkov   
Spartak Poltava               0-1  SAKHARNIKI Sumy 
SPARTAK Sumy                  1-0  Sakharniki Karlovka 
TRAKTOR Kharkov               w/o  Lokomotiv Poltava 
ZDOROVYE Kharkov              w/o  Dinamo Kharkov 
ZENIT Kharkov                 3-1  Metallist Kharkov

===== Quarterfinals =====
[May 11] 
STALINETS Kharkov             4-1  Avtomotor Kharkov 
ZDOROVYE Kharkov              4-3  Avangard Kharkov 
[May 12] 
LOKOMOTIV Kharkov             1-0  Sakharniki Sumy 
ZENIT Kharkov                 w/o  Molniya Kharkov 
[May 13] 
TRAKTOR Kharkov               5-1  Spartak Sumy

===== Semifinals =====
[May 15] 
ZENIT Kharkov                 3-0  Stalinets Kharkov 
Byes: Zdorovye, Traktor, Lokomotiv.

===== Finals =====
[May 24] 
LOKOMOTIV Kharkov             3-0  Zenit Kharkov 
ZDOROVYE Kharkov              1-0  Traktor Kharkov

==== Group 15 (Kiev) ====
===== Quarterfinals =====
[May 5] 
Dinamo Zhitomir               1-1  Dinamo Mogilyov-Podolskiy 
[May 6] 
Azot Shostka                  1-10 DINAMO-2 Kiev 
Dinamo Vinnitsa               1-1  Vodnik Kiev 
LOKOMOTIV Konotop             w/o  DKA Korosten 
LOKOMOTIV-2 Kiev              4-2  Roth Front Kiev 
Spartak Kiev                  1-2  TEKHNIKUM FK Kiev   
Spartak Korosten              w/o  SPARTAK Chernigov 
ZENIT Kiev                    5-3  Temp Vinnitsa

====== Quarterfinals replays ======
[May 6] 
DINAMO Zhitomir               1-0  Dinamo Mogilev-Podolskiy 
[May 7] 
Dinamo Vinnitsa               1-2  VODNIK Kiev                     [aet]

===== Semifinals =====
[May 12] 
DINAMO-2 Kiev                 3-1  Dinamo Zhitomir   
Tekhnikum FK Kiev             0-3  LOKOMOTIV-2 Kiev   
VODNIK Kiev                   2-0  Spartak Chernigov   
ZENIT Kiev                    5-1  Lokomotiv Konotop

===== Finals =====
[May 19] 
LOKOMOTIV-2 Kiev              3-2  Zenit Kiev 
[May 20] 
DINAMO-2 Kiev                 2-1  Vodnik Kiev                     [aet]

==== Group 16 (Odessa) ====
===== Quarterfinals =====
[May 6] 
Burevestnik Krivoi Rog        3-3  Lokomotiv Kotovsk 
DZERZHINETS Kremenchug        4-0  Spartak Tiraspol 
LOKOMOTIV Odessa              4-0  Ruda Krivoi Rog 
Lokomotiv Voznesensk          1-3  PISHCHEVIK Odessa   
Pishchevik Kherson            0-4  DINAMO Nikolayev 
SELMASH Kirovo                2-1  Znaniye Kherson 
Stroitel Krivoi Rog           1-3  STAL Krivoi Rog   
SUDOSTROITEL Nikolayev        8-0  Vodnik Kherson

====== Quarterfinals replays ======
[May 7] 
BUREVESTNIK Krivoi Rog        w/o  Lokomotiv Kotovsk

===== Semifinals =====
[May 12] 
Burevestnik Krivoi Rog        2-4  LOKOMOTIV Odessa   
DINAMO Nikolayev              7-0  Stal Krivoi Rog 
Dzerzhinets Kremenchug        2-0  SelMash Kirovo   
[May 18] 
PISHCHEVIK Odessa             4-1  Sudostroitel Nikolayev

===== Finals =====
[May 18] 
DINAMO Nikolayev              3-0  Lokomotiv Odessa 
[May 24] 
PISHCHEVIK Odessa             w/o  Dzerzhinets Kremenchug

==== Group 17 (Dnepropetrovsk) ====
===== Quarterfinals =====
[May 5] 
STAL Dneprodzerzhinsk         7-0  Tekhnikum FK Dnepropetrovsk 
LOKOMOTIV Zaporozhye          3-2  Lokomotiv Dnepropetrovsk 
ZiP Dnepropetrovsk            1-3  SELMASH Zaporozhye 
[May 6] 
Krylya Sovetov Berdyansk      0-5  DINAMO Dnepropetrovsk 
LOKOMOTIV Lozovaya            6-1  Lokomotiv Sinelnikovo 
SPARTAK Dnepropetrovsk        3-0  Krylya Sovetov Zaporozhye 
Stroitel Dneprodzerzhinsk     0-4  ZIL Dnepropetrovsk 
TSVETMET Zaporozhye           5-3  ZiK Dnepropetrovsk

===== Semifinals =====
[May 12] 
Dinamo Dnepropetrovsk         0-1  SPARTAK Dnepropetrovsk          [aet]   
STAL Dneprodzerzhinsk         4-1  SelMash Zaporozhye 
[May 13] 
ZiL Dnepropetrovsk            1-2  TSVETMET Zaporozhye   
[May 15] 
LOKOMOTIV Zaporozhye          6-1  Lokomotiv Lozovaya

===== Finals =====
[May 18] 
LOKOMOTIV Zaporozhye          4-2  TsvetMet Zaporozhye 
SPARTAK Dnepropetrovsk        4-2  Stal Dneprodzerzhinsk

==== Group 18 (Donetsk) ====
===== First round =====
[May 5] 
Azot Nizhnyaya Gorlovka       1-2  BUREVESTNIK Stalino 
[May 6] 
Avangard Stalino              2-3  SHAKHTA-30 Rutchenkovo 
Dzerzhinets Voroshilovgrad    0-6  STAL Konstantinovka 
Lokomotiv Slavyansk           3-4  ZIS Kramatorsk 
Lokomotiv Yasinovataya        1-2  ZIL Krasnogorovka 
Spartak Starobelsk            0-3  ZENIT Stalino 
STAKHANOVETS Artyomovsk       3-2  Avangard Druzhkovka 
STAKHANOVETS Lisichansk       3-0  Avangard Gorlovka 
Stakhanovets Sergo            w/o  BUREVESTNIK Krasny Luch 
STAL Makeyevka                1-0  Stal Stalino 
Stal Voroshilovsk             2-3  STAKHANOVETS Orjonikidze 
ZIO Kramatorsk                4-2  Stakhanovets Krasnoarmeisk

===== Quarterfinals =====
[May 11] 
BUREVESTNIK Stalino           3-1  ZiL Krasnogorovka 
[May 12] 
SHAKHTA-30 Rutchenkovo        1-0  Stal Makeyevka   
Stakhanovets Orjonikidze      0-1  STAKHANOVETS Lisichansk 
ZENIT Stalino                12-0  Burevestnik Krasny Luch 
ZIS Kramatorsk                3-1  Stakhanovets Krasny Luch 
[May 18] 
STAL Konstantinovka           8-0  Stakhanovets Artyomovsk  
Bye: ZiO Kramatorsk

===== Semifinals =====
[May 21] 
Burevestnik Stalino           0-7  STAL Konstantinovka   
ZENIT Stalino                 4-0  Stakhanovets Lisichansk 
ZIS Kramatorsk                3-1  Shakhta-30 Rutchenkovo 
Bye: ZiO Kramatorsk

===== Finals =====
[May 24] 
Stal Konstantinovka           0-0  Zenit Stalino 
ZIS Kramatorsk                3-2  ZiO Kramatorsk

====== Final replays ======
[May 25] 
STAL Konstantinovka           w/o  Zenit Stalino

==== Group 19 (Simferopol) ====
===== Quarterfinals =====
[Jul 6] 
Pishchevik Simferopol         0-1  SPARTAK Simferopol

===== Semifinals =====
[Jul 12] 
Pishchevik Kerch              1-3  SPARTAK Simferopol   
SUDOSTROITEL Sevastopol       3-2  Stal Kerch

===== Final =====
[Jul 18] 
SPARTAK Simferopol            2-1  Sudostroitel Sevastopol

=== Teams qualified for the final stage ===
==== Per qualification group ====
- Group 1 (Central Russia/Moscow): Spartak-2 Moscow, Lokomotiv-2 Moscow, Sherstyanik Moscow, Stalinets-2 Moscow, Dinamo Bolshevo, Fabrika Pravda Likino-Dulyovo, Krasnoye Znamia Noginsk, Zenit Podlipki
- Group 2 (Northern Russia/Leningrad): Zavod imeni Kulakova Leningrad, Kirovskiy Zavod Leningrad, Lokomotiv Yaroslavl, Zavod Elektrik Leningrad
- Group 3 (Central Black Earth/Voronezh): Dinamo Voronezh
- Group 4 (Far East/Khabarovsk): Dinamo Irkutsk
- Group 5 (Siberia/Novosibirsk): Stroitel Novosibirsk
- Group 6 (Ural/Sverdlovsk): Dinamo Sverdlovsk, Stroitel Sverdlovsk
- Group 7 (Upper Volga/Gorkiy): Dinamo Kazan, Torpedo Gorkiy
- Group 8 (Lower Volga/Stalingrad): Dinamo Stalingrad, Lokomotiv Saratov
- Group 9 (South Russia/Rostov-na-Donu): Energiya Novocherkassk, Zenit Taganrog
- Group 10 (Trans-Caucasus/Tbilisi): Dinamo Batumi
- Group 11 (South Caspiy/Baku): Lokomotiv Baku
- Group 12 (Central Asia/Tashkent): Dinamo Alma-Ata
- Group 13 (Belarus/Minsk): Spartak Minsk
- Group 14 (Northeast Ukraine/Kharkov): Lokomotiv Kharkov, Zdorovye Kharkov
- Group 15 (Northwest Ukraine/Kiev): Lokomotiv-2 Kiev, Dinamo-2 Kiev
- Group 16 (Southwest Ukraine/Odessa): Dinamo Nikolayev, Pischevik Odessa
- Group 17 (Southeast Ukraine/Dnepropetrovsk): Lokomotiv Zaporozhye, Spartak Dnepropetrovsk
- Group 18 (East Ukraine/Donetsk): Zavod imeni Stalina Kramatorsk, Stal Konstantinovka
- Group 19 (Crimea/Simferopol): Spartak Simferopol

==== Per union republic ====
- RSFSR: 24
- UkrSSR: 10
- BSSR: 1
- KazSSR: 1
- GSSR: 1
- AzSSR: 1
- Total: 38

=== Final stage ===
==== First round ====
[Jul 21] 
Zavod Elektrik Leningrad      0-6  SELMASH Kharkov 
[Jul 29] 
Sherstyanik Moskva            1-4  PISHCHEVIK Odessa 
[Jul 30] 
Dinamo Sverdlovsk             1-3  DINAMO Kazan 
  [Moshchanov 25 – Ivan Pashalyan 40, Lev Bessarab 55, ? 78] 
Krasnoye Znamya Noginsk       1-1  Stalinets Leningrad 
  [Kolomkin 25 – Alexei Larionov 68] 
[Aug 1] 
AVANGARD Kramatorsk           w/o  Lokomotiv Zaporozhye 
DINAMO Batumi                 2-0  Energiya Novocherkassk 
DINAMO Kiev                   2-0  Lokomotiv Moskva 
  [Konstantin Shchegodskiy 7, Viktor Shilovskiy 61] 
Dinamo-2 Kiev                 0-1  STAL Konstantinovka 
  [I.Gorobets 30] 
SPARTAK Minsk                 w/o  Lokomotiv Kharkov 
SPARTAK Moskva                5-2  ZiK Leningrad 
  [Viktor Semyonov-2, Alexei Sokolov, Vladimir Stepanov, Georgiy Glazkov pen - ?] 
STALINETS-2 Moskva            3-2  Zdorovye Kharkov 
  [? 11, Sukhanov 62, Glebov 65 – Fursov 10, 48] 
ZENIT Leningrad               5-4  Zenit Podlipki 
[Aug 2] 
DINAMO Nikolayev              3-0  Kirovskiy Zavod Leningrad 
  [Ivan Kolbanov 3, Vladimir Ishchenko 42, Grigoriy Kushnyrenko 89] 
Fabrika Pravda Likino-Dulyovo 0-5  ELEKTRIK Leningrad 
Lokomotiv-2 Kiev              1-7  METALLURG Moskva   
[Aug 3] 
Lokomotiv Saratov             2-2  Dinamo Stalingrad 
  [Shapovalov 52, Afinogenov 88 – Balyasov 48, Tokarev 72] 
Lokomotiv-2 Moskva            1-1  Dinamo Bolshevo 
Spartak Simferopol            1-2  LOKOMOTIV Kiev 
  [Zyukin 67 pen – Iosif Kachkin 12, Alexandr Galkin 18 pen] 
STAKHANOVETS Stalino          5-0  Lokomotiv Yaroslavl 
  [Grigoriy Nesmekha 10, ?, Vasiliy Sidorov, Mikhail Vasin, Nikolai Kononenko, ??] 
TORPEDO Gorkiy                7-0  Stroitel Sverdlovsk 
  [Viktor Drozdov-3, Leonid Yefimov-2, Nikolai Dunayev, Alexei Salakov] 
[Aug 5] 
CDKA Moskva                   0-1  SPARTAK Leningrad 
  [Ilya Bizyukov 40] 
DINAMO Odessa                 2-1  Spartak-2 Moskva 
  [Leonid Orekhov, Mikhail Heison - ?] 
Dinamo Voronezh               0-4  STALINETS Moskva 
TORPEDO Moskva                3-1  Dinamo Moskva 
  [Alexandr Sinyakov 25, Konstantin Ryazantsev 65, Ramiz Karichev 88 – Konstantin Ratnikov 45] 
[Aug 6] 
DINAMO Alma-Ata               2-1  Zenit Taganrog                  [aet] 
  [Chernyshov 68, G.Bedritskiy 112 – Tishchenko 25] 
DINAMO Tbilisi                4-1  Lokomotiv Tbilisi 
  [Viktor Berezhnoi 22, 68, Mikhail Berdzenishvili 55 pen, Luasarb Loladze 85 – Ivan Cherednichenko 12] 
TEMP Baku                     w/o  Traktor Stalingrad 
[Aug 7] 
DINAMO Leningrad              2-1  Krylya Sovetov Moskva 
  [Sergei Yegorov 74, Arkadiy Alov 76 – Matvei Yenushkov 77] 
Spartak Dnepropetrovsk        0-1  PISHCHEVIK Moskva 
  [P.Nikiforov 80] 
[Aug 8] 
Lokomotiv Baku                3-5  DINAMO Rostov-na-Donu 
  [Sergei Gudkov 30, 40, Konstantin Kitayev 55 – Valeriy Bekhtenev 22, 67, 82, Sergei Dombazov 55, ?] 
SPARTAK Kharkov               3-0  Burevestnik Moskva 
  [Alexei Serov 1, Boris Gurkin 11, ?] 
[Aug 10] 
Stroitel Novosibirsk          0-0  Dinamo Irkutsk

===== First round replays =====
[Jul 31] 
Krasnoye Znamya Noginsk       3-4  STALINETS Leningrad 
  [Trofimov 1, Kolomkin 85, Korshakov 87 – Georgiy Lasin 25, 64, Valentin Shelagin 55, Alexei Larionov 82] 
[Aug 4] 
Lokomotiv Saratov             2-3  DINAMO Stalingrad 
  [Afinogenov 15, Tarasov 75 – Balyasov 10, 38, 43] 
Lokomotiv-2 Moskva            2-3  DINAMO Bolshevo 
  [Dogadov 39, Ogurtsov 47 - ?] 
[Aug 11] 
Stroitel Novosibirsk          0-4  DINAMO Irkutsk

==== Second round ====
[Aug 6] 
Dinamo Kiev                   0-1  STALINETS Leningrad 
  [Georgiy Lasin 3] 
Pishchevik Odessa             1-5  ELEKTRIK Leningrad 
  [? pen – Pavel Artemyev-2, Vasiliy Lotkov, Alexandr A.Fyodorov, Pyotr Karas] 
Stal Konstantinovka           1-4  SPARTAK Moskva 
  [Anton Yakovlev 56 – Vladimir Stepanov 6, 60, Viktor Semyonov 25, Georgiy Glazkov 78] 
[Aug 8] 
Dinamo Nikolayev              0-2  LOKOMOTIV Kiev 
  [Alexandr Galkin 16, Konstantin Avramenko 69] 
[Aug 9] 
Avangard Kramatorsk           0-0  Metallurg Moskva    
[Aug 11] 
DINAMO Bolshevo               2-1  Spartak Kharkov 
  [Alexandr Shcherbakov 70, Viktor Osminkin 80 - ? 87] 
DINAMO Tbilisi                4-2  Dinamo Rostov-na-Donu 
  [Boris Paichadze 2, 43, Georgiy Apridonidze 20, 44 – German Vodopyanov 49 pen, ? 86] 
Stalinets Moskva              0-2  SELMASH Kharkov  
  [Fyodor Lukyanenko 55, Ivan Golubov 68]  
[Aug 12] 
Spartak Leningrad             1-5  STAKHANOVETS Stalino 
  [Sergei Strokov 12 – Mikhail Vasin 8, 38, Nikolai Kononenko 42, Nikolai Naumov 60, Grigoriy Nesmekha 80] 
Torpedo Gorkiy                2-3  DINAMO Leningrad 
  [Viktor Drozdov 24, Mamulashvili 72 – Pyotr Bykov 43 pen, Arkadiy Alov 60, Nikolai Dementyev 72] 
[Aug 13] 
Dinamo Stalingrad             0-0  Temp Baku 
Spartak Minsk                 1-3  ZENIT Leningrad 
  [Nikolai Zinovyev 63 – Nikolai Postavnin 22, Sergei Valker 40, Alexandr Fesenko 75] 
[Aug 14] 
Pishchevik Moskva             1-2  DINAMO Odessa 
  [? – Ivan Ishchenko 68, Ivan Borisevich 75] 
TORPEDO Moskva                1-0  Stalinets-2 Moskva 
  [Ramiz Karichev 26] 
[Aug 17] 
DINAMO Kazan                 10-0  Dinamo Irkutsk 
[Aug 21] 
DINAMO Batumi                 3-2  Dinamo Alma-Ata                 [aet]

===== Second round replays =====
[Aug 10] 
Avangard Kramatorsk           1-6  METALLURG Moskva    
[Aug 14] 
Dinamo Stalingrad             0-1  TEMP Baku 
  [Makarov 80]

==== Third round ====
[Aug 16] 
ELEKTRIK Leningrad            1-0  Zenit Leningrad 
  [Pavel Artemyev 67] 
Metallurg Moskva              1-3  STAKHANOVETS Stalino 
  [Sergei Kapelkin 52 – Nikolai Kononenko 23, Mikhail Vasin 68, Grigoriy Balaba 84] 
[Aug 17] 
Torpedo Moskva                0-3  DINAMO Bolshevo 
  [Vasiliy Trofimov 38, 67, Alexandr Shcherbakov 62] 
[Aug 21] 
Dinamo Odessa                 2-2  SelMash Kharkov 
  [Yuzef Sositskiy, Alexandr Bragin - ?] 
DINAMO Tbilisi                4-2  Stalinets Leningrad           [in Moskva]   
  [Boris Paichadze 25, 52, Gayoz Jejelava 40, 53 – Georgiy Lasin 43, Alexei Larionov 78] 
[Aug 26] 
DINAMO Leningrad              2-1  Dinamo Kazan 
  [Alexei Baryshev 30, Konstantin Sazonov 79 – Lev Bessarab 18] 
LOKOMOTIV Kiev                2-1  Dinamo Batumi 
  [Iosif Kachkin 10, Fyodor Kuzmenko 12 - Karp Karmatazyan 8]
SPARTAK Moskva                1-0  Temp Baku                       [aet]
  [Georgiy Glazkov 94]

===== Third round replays =====
[Aug 22] 
DINAMO Odessa                 4-1  SelMash Kharkov 
  [Alexandr Ilyashov 24, Ivan Borisevich 55, 57, Makar Gichkin 79 – Anatoliy Gorokhov 16]

==== Quarterfinals ====
[Aug 22] 
ELEKTRIK Leningrad            4-0  Dinamo Bolshevo 
  [Vladimir Lemeshev, ?..] 
[Aug 31] 
Stakhanovets Stalino          1-4  DINAMO Tbilisi          [in Kiev] 
  [Nikolai Kononenko 35 – Boris Paichadze 28, 60, 73, Tengiz Gavasheli 71] 
[Sep 3] 
Dinamo Odessa                 0-3  SPARTAK Moskva 
  [Georgiy Glazkov 24, Vladimir Stepanov 76, Alexei Sokolov 86] 
[Sep 4] 
DINAMO Leningrad              4-2  Lokomotiv Kiev 
  [Pyotr Bykov 47, 59, 64 pen, Nikolai Dementyev 62 – Alexandr Shatskiy 12, Konstantin Avramenko 49]

==== Semifinals ====
[Sep 7] 
ELEKTRIK Leningrad            2-1  Dinamo Tbilisi 
  [Vasiliy Lotkov 50, Nikolai Antsiferov 85 – Boris Paichadze 18]
[Sep 10] 
Dinamo Leningrad              0-1  SPARTAK Moskva 
  [Georgiy Glazkov 90 pen]

=== Final ===
14 September 1938

Spartak Moscow	3 – 2	Elektrik Leningrad
Gulyayev 14'; Starostin 51'; Semyonov 65'	[ Report]	Yablochkin 45'; Gusev 70' (pen.)

Moscow

== Top goalscorers ==
Statistical data is incomplete and based on rounds starting from the fourth round (Round of 16).

Scorer	Team	Goals
Boris Paichadze	Dinamo Tbilisi	6
Pyotr Bykov	Dinamo Leningrad	3 (1)
Georgiy Glazkov	Spartak Moscow	3 (1)
Ivan Borisevich	Dinamo Odessa	2
Gayoz Jejelava	Dinamo Tbilisi	2
Nikolai Kononenko	Stakhanovets Stalino	2
Vasiliy Trofimov	Dinamo Bolshevo	2

== See also ==
- 1938 Soviet Top League
