= 1935 Football Championship of the Ukrainian SSR =

Football Championship of UkrSSR
- Season: 1935
- Champions: Dnipropetrovsk
- Runner up: Kyiv

The 1935 Football Championship of UkrSSR were part of the 1935 Soviet republican football competitions in the Soviet Ukraine.

== Persha Hrupa ==
Pos	Team	Pld	W	D	L	GF	GA	GR	Pts
1	Dnipropetrovsk	4	2	1	1	9	6	1.500	9
2	Kyiv	4	2	1	1	8	6	1.333	9
3	Kharkiv	4	1	2	1	7	8	0.875	8
4	Odesa	4	1	1	2	5	6	0.833	7
5	Stalino	4	1	1	2	5	8	0.625	7

== Druha Hrupa ==
1/4 finals

- Chernihiv — Horlivka + : - (no show)
- Kramatorsk — Kadiivka 1 : 0
- Tiraspol — Mykolaiv 1 : 3
- Kostyantynivka — Vinnytsia 8 : 1

1/2 finals

- Chernihiv — Kramatorsk 0 : 7
- Mykolaiv — Kostyantynivka + : - (score 4:5 was annulled, as the ejected with two minutes to play, player of visitors Kononenko refused to leave a field)

Final.

- Kramatorsk — Mykolaiv 1 : 1
- Kramatorsk — Mykolaiv 2 : 0 (replay)

== Tretia Hrupa ==
1/4 finals

- Zaporizhia — Kherson 4:0
- Poltava — Kryvyi Rih 2:7
- Luhansk — Kamianske 3:1
- Kamianets-Podilsk — Zhytomyr —:+

1/2 finals

- Zaporizhia — Kryvyi Rih 5:3
- Luhansk — Zhytomyr 5:0

Final

- Luhansk — Zaporizhia 2:1 (score of the game was annulled as in Luhansk's squad played goalkeeper Pavlov who during the ongoing year played for Kadiivka).
- Zaporizhia — Luhansk 1:3 (replay)
