= 1921 Football Championship of the Ukrainian SSR =

1921 Championship of the Soviet Ukraine was the first football tournament conducted in the Soviet Ukraine. Its final portion, starting from the quarter-finals, took place in the capital city of Kharkiv.

== Quarter-finals ==
| Team 1 | Score | Team 2 |
|---|---|---|
| Kharkiv | 5:0 | Kherson |
| Tahanroh | 1:0 | Kyiv |
| Odesa | 5:1 | Katerynoslav |
| Mykolaiv | 7:0 | Poltava |

== Semifinals ==
| Team 1 | Score | Team 2 |
|---|---|---|
| Kharkiv | 2:1 | Taganrog |
| Odessa | 1:0 | Mykolaiv |

== Final ==
| Team 1 | Score | Team 2 |
|---|---|---|
| Kharkiv | 2:0 | Odessa |

Kharkiv: Vinnykov, Levin, Natarov, Shpakovsky, Bem, Bizyaev, Alfyorov, Kapustin, Varzheninov, Makeyev, Ordin, Kazakov, Romanenko, Lazunenko.
