= Viktor Shylovskyi =

Soviet footballer

Viktor Shylovsky
Personal information
- Full name: Viktor Kostiantynovych Shylovsky
- Date of birth: 25 July 1911
- Place of birth: Yuzovka, Yekaterinoslav Governorate, Russian Empire
- Date of death: 20 October 1973 (aged 62)
- Place of death: Moscow, Russian SFSR, Soviet Union
- Position: Forward

Youth career
- ?–1930: Lenin FC Stalino

Senior career*
Years	Team	Apps	(Gls)
1930–1932	Metalists Stalino		
1933–1933	Dynamo Stalino		
1934–1934	Dynamo Dnipropetrovsk		
1934–1941	Dynamo Kyiv		
1946–1947	Pishchevik Moscow		

International career
1935	USSR	6	(2)

Managerial career
- 1948–1949: Dzerzhynets Nizhny Tagil
- 1950–1955: FC Serpukhov
- 1957–1958: Dynamo Kyiv
- 1967: Saturn Ramenskoye
- * Club domestic league appearances and goals

Viktor Kostiantynovych Shylovsky (born in 1911 in Yuzovka; died in 1973 in Moscow) was a Soviet football player and participant of the 1937 Workers' Summer Olympiad with FC Spartak Moscow.

== Honours ==
- USSR champion: 1924

Dynamo Kyiv

- Cup of the Ukrainian SSR: 1936

He holds the record number of goals scored in finals – 5. He played in three finals (1936, 1937, 1938).

== International career ==
Shylovsky played in several unofficial games for USSR and Ukraine.
