= 1938 Football Championship of the Ukrainian SSR =

Football Championship of UkrSSR
- Season: 1938
- Dates: 24 August 1938 – 24 October 1938
- Champions: FC Dzerzhynets Voroshylovhrad
- Runner up: FC Stal Dniprodzerzhynsk

The 1938 Football Championship of UkrSSR were part of the 1938 Soviet republican football competitions in the Soviet Ukraine. In 1938 the All-Union level went through major changes when there was formed one "Super League" which many "teams of masters" from Dnipropetrovsk and Kharkiv lost their status.

The defending champions were Spartak Dnipropetrovsk.

== Persha Hrupa ==
Promoted:

- (Druha Hrupa) Dzerzhynets Voroshylovhrad, Stal Dniprodzerzhynsk, Stal Kryvyi Rih
- (debut) Kharchovyk Odesa, Dynamo-2 Kyiv, Lokomotyv Kharkiv

Relegated: Stal Kostiantynivka, Sudnobudivnyk Mykolaiv
Replaced: Sudnobudivnyk Mykolaiv and Sudnobudivnyk-2 Mykolaiv → Dynamo Mykolaiv

Pos	Team	Pld	W	D	L	GF	GA	GR	Pts	Promotion or relegation	FDV	FSD	FDM	FSK	FKO	FAK	FZS	D2K	FSP	KRZ	SKR	FLK
1	FC Dzerzhynets Voroshylovhrad	11	9	2	0	27	9	3.000	31	Promoted to the Gruppa B	—	2–2	0–0	2–1	2–1	4–0	3–0	1–0	4–0	4–2	3–2	2–1
2	FC Stal Dniprodzerzhynsk	11	7	3	1	40	20	2.000	28			—	2–2	5–3	4–0	1–2	4–2	4–3	1–1	5–4	3–0	9–1
3	FC Dynamo Mykolaiv	11	7	3	1	26	8	3.250	28				—	0–2	0–0	4–0	4–1	3–0	5–1	5–1	+/-	3–1
4	FC Stal Kostiantynivka	11	7	0	4	26	15	1.733	25					—	1–2	2–0	1–0	0–2	4–1	3–1	5–0	4–2
5	FC Kharchovyk Odesa	11	4	4	3	16	16	1.000	23						—	0–3	2–2	1–1	3–1	1–1	+/-	6–1
6	FC Avanhard Kramatorsk	11	5	1	5	18	20	0.900	22							—	0–2	3–0	1–1	3–1	6–2	0–3
7	FC Zenit Stalino	11	4	1	6	20	23	0.870	20								—	2–0	1–3	2–4	5–1	3–1
8	FC Dynamo-2 Kyiv	11	3	2	6	21	25	0.840	19									—	1–1	2–5	7–2	5–3
9	FC Spartak Dnipropetrovsk	11	2	4	5	16	26	0.615	19	Relegated to Druha Hrupa									—	1–1	1–4	5–1
10	FC Kryla Rad Zaporizhia	11	3	2	6	23	26	0.885	18 (Note: 1 point deducted for no show)	Relegated to Druha Hrupa										—	-/+	3–0
11	FC Stal Kryvyi Rih	11	2	0	9	11	34	0.324	14	Relegated to Druha Hrupa											—	0–4
12	FC Lokomotyv Kharkiv	11	2	0	9	18	40	0.450	15													—

== Druha Hrupa ==
Promoted: Stal Voroshylovsk (Tretia Hrupa), Kharchovyk Tyraspol (Tretia Hrupa), Avanhard Druzhkivka (Hrupa Pyat A)

Pos	Team	Pld	W	D	L	GF	GA	GR	Pts	Promotion or relegation	STV	AVD	AVH	SCH	TMP	TYR
1	Stal Voroshylovsk	5	4	0	1	14	6	2.333	13		—	2–1	3–0	1–2	4–0	4–3
2	Avanhard Druzhkivka	5	4	0	1	16	11	1.455	13			—	2–1	5–4	2–1	6–3
3	Avanhard Horlivka	5	3	0	2	16	7	2.286	11				—	3–0	9–1	3–1
4	Spartak Chernihiv	5	3	0	2	6	9	0.667	11	Relegated to Tretia Hrupa				—	+/-	+/-
5	Temp Vinnytsia	5	1	0	4	4	15	0.267	6 (Note: 1 point deducted for no show)	Withdrew after the season					—	2–0
6	Kharchovyk Tyraspil (MASSR)	5	0	0	5	7	15	0.467	4	Withdrew after the season						—

Notes:

Stakhanovets Sergo withdrew before the start

== Tretia Hrupa ==
All lower groups were restructured and groups below the 3rd were consolidated into Tretia Hrupa.
Promoted:

- (whole Chetverta Hrupa except Shostka) Stal Makiivka, Berdychiv, Ordzhonikidze, Konotop, Sumy, Kremenchuk, Chystiakove
- (whole Hrupa Pyat A except Mariupol) Voznesensk, Berdyansk, Starobilsk, Krasnyi Luch, Kirovo, Sloviansk
- (whole Hrupa Pyat B except Rubizhne) Stakhanovets Krasnoarmiysk, Novohrad-Volynskyi, Korosten, Synelnykove, Uman, Koziatyn, Melitopol
- (returning) Artemivsk
- (debut) Smila, z-d im. Lenina Verkhniy, Stakhanovets Lysychansk, Lokomotyv Lozova

=== Zone 1 (East) ===
Subgroup A

Pos	Team	Pld	W	D	L	GF	GA	GD	Pts	KRL	MAK	ORD	CHY
1	Krasnyi Luch	3	3	0	0	10	4	+6	9	—	4–2	3–2	3–0
2	Makiivka	3	2	0	1	4	5	−1	7		—	2–1	+/-
3	Ordzhonikidze	3	1	0	2	3	5	−2	5			—	+/-
4	Chystiakove	3	0	0	3	0	3	−3	1 (Note: 2 points deducted for 2 games missed)				—

Notes:

Subgroup B

Pos	Team	Pld	W	D	L	GF	GA	GD	Pts	MLT	KRA	SYN	BRD
1	Melitopol	2	2	0	0	5	1	+4	6	—	+/-	5–1	—
2	Stakhanovets Krasnoarmiysk	2	1	0	1	2	1	+1	3 (Note: 1 points deducted for no show)		—	2–1	—
3	Lokomotyv Synelnykove	2	0	0	2	2	7	−5	2			—	—
4	Berdyansk	0	0	0	0	0	0	0	0	—	—	—	—

Notes:
- Berdyansk excluded

Zone 1 final

- Krasnyi Luch — Melitopol 3:0

=== Zone 2 (West) ===
Subgroup A

Pos	Team	Pld	W	D	L	GF	GA	GD	Pts	BRD	ZHY	NOV	KOR
1	Berdychiv	3	3	0	0	11	5	+6	9	—	3–2	5–3	3–0
2	Zhytomyr	3	2	0	1	7	5	+2	7		—	2–1	3–1
3	Novohrad-Volynskyi	3	0	1	2	5	8	−3	4			—	1–1
4	Korosten	3	0	1	2	2	7	−5	4				—

Subgroup B

Pos	Team	Pld	W	D	L	GF	GA	GD	Pts	MOH	KAM	UMN	KOZ
1	Mohyliv-Podilskyi	2	2	0	0	2	1	+1	6	—	2–1	+/-	—
2	Kamianets-Podilsk	2	0	1	1	3	4	−1	3		—	2–2	—
3	Uman	2	0	1	1	2	2	0	2 (Note: 1 points deducted for no show)			—	—
4	Koziatyn	0	0	0	0	0	0	0	0	—	—	—	—

Notes:
- Koziatyn excluded

Zone 2 final

- Mohyliv-Podilskyi — Berdychiv 1:0

=== Zone 3 (Centre) ===
Subgroup A

Pos	Team	Pld	W	D	L	GF	GA	GD	Pts	KHE	VOZ	KRV	KRE
1	Znannia Kherson	2	2	0	0	6	1	+5	6	—	3–0	3–1	—
2	Voznesensk	2	1	0	1	2	3	−1	4		—	2–0	—
3	Kirovo	2	0	0	2	1	5	−4	2			—	—
4	Kremenchuk	0	0	0	0	0	0	0	0	—	—	—	—

- Kremenchuk was excluded for no show to matches with Kherson and Voznesensk.

Subgroup B

Pos	Team	1	2	3	4
1	Poltava		3:1		
?	Konotop				
?	Sumy				
?	Smila				

Zone 3 final

- Poltava — Znannia Kherson 3:2

=== Zone 4 (East) ===
Subgroup A

Pos	Team	Pld	W	D	L	GF	GA	GD	Pts	VRX	LYS	KUP	STA
1	z-d im. Lenina Verkhniy	3	2	0	1	6	3	+3	7	—		5–0	+/-
2	Stakhanovets Lysychansk	3	2	0	1	10	4	+6	7	3–1	—	1–3	6–0
3	Kupiansk	3	1	0	2	3	6	−3	4 (Note: 1 point deducted for no show)			—	-/-
4	Starobilsk	3	0	0	3	0	6	−6	1 (Note: 2 points deducted for 2 games missed)				—

Notes:

Subgroup B

Pos	Team	Pld	W	D	L	GF	GA	GD	Pts	LOZ	ART	SLO
1	Lokomotyv Lozova	2	2	0	0	5	0	+5	6	—	+/-	5–0
2	Artemivsk	2	1	0	1	0	0	0	3 (Note: 1 point deducted for no show)		—	+/-
3	Sloviansk	2	0	0	2	0	5	−5	1 (Note: 1 point deducted for no show)			—

Notes:

Zone 4 final

- z-d im. Lenina Verkhniy — Lokomotyv Lozova ?:?

== Ukrainian clubs at the All-Union level ==
- Group A (6): Dynamo Kyiv, Dynamo Odesa, Stakhanovets Stalino, Silmash Kharkiv, Lokomotyv Kyiv, Spartak Kharkiv

== Withdrawn ==
- (all-Union level) Stal (z-d im. Lenina) Dnipropetrovsk (1936), Dynamo Dnipropetrovsk (1937), Stal (z-d im. Petrovskoho) Dnipropetrovsk (1937), Lokomotyv Dnipropetrovsk (1937), Traktor Kharkiv (1937), Dynamo Kharkiv (1937), Spartak Kyiv (1937)
- (Republican) UDKA Kiev (1936), z-d im. Stalina Stalino (1936), z-d KinAp Odesa (1936), Stalinets Kharkiv (1937), Vympel Kyiv (1937), Sudnobudivnyk-2 Mykolaiv (1937), Stakhanovets Serho (1937), Mariupol (1937), Rubizhne (1937), Stalinets Kharkiv (1937), Shostka (1937)

== Number of teams by region ==
Number	Region	Team(s)	
Number	Region	Ukrainian SSR	All-Union
4-3-9 (1)	Donetsk Oblast	Dzerzhynets Voroshilovhrad, Stal Kostiantynivka, Avanhard Kramatorsk, Zenit Stalino, Stal Voroshylovsk, Avanhard Druzhkivka, Avanhard Horlvika, Krasnyi Luch, Makiivka, Chystiakove, Stakhanovets Krasnoarmiysk, z-d im. Lenina Verkhniy, Stakhanovets Lysychansk, Starobilsk, Artemivsk, Sloviansk	Stakhanovets Stalino
4-0-4 (0)	Dnipropetrovsk Oblast	Stal Dniprodzerzhynsk, Spartak Dnipropetrovsk, Kryla Rad Zaporizhia, Stal Kryvyi Rih, Ordzhonikidze, Melitopol, Lokomotyv Synelnykove, Berdiansk	–
1-0-3 (2)	Kharkiv Oblast	Lokomotyv Kharkiv, Sumy, Kupiansk, Lokomotyv Lozova	Silmash Kharkiv, Spartak Kharkiv
1-0-2 (0)	Mykolaiv Oblast	Dynamo Mykolaiv, Znannia Kherson, Kirovo	–
1-0-1 (2)	Kyiv Oblast	Dynamo-2 Kyiv, Smila	Dynamo Kyiv, Lokomotyv Kyiv
1-0-1 (1)	Odesa Oblast	Kharchovyk Odesa, Voznesensk	Dynamo Odesa
0-1-3 (0)	Vinnytsia Oblast	Temp Vinnytsia, Mohyliv-Podilskyi, Uman, Koziatyn	–
0-1-1 (0)	Chernihiv Oblast	Spartak Chernihiv, Konotop	–
0-1-0 (0)	(Moldavian Soviet Socialist Republic) Moldavian ASSR	Kharchovyk Tyraspol	–
0-0-4 (0)	Zhytomyr Oblast	Berdychiv, Zhytomyr, Novohrad-Volynskyi, Korosten	–
0-0-2 (0)	Poltava Oblast	Kremenchuk, Poltava	–
0-0-1 (0)	Khmelnytskyi Oblast	Kamianets-Podilsk	–

== See also ==
- 1938 Cup of the Ukrainian SSR
