= Mykola Makhynia =

Soviet and Ukrainian footballer and coach

Personal information
- Full name: Mykola Borysovych Makhynia
- Date of birth: November 30, 1912
- Place of birth: Kaniv, Kiev Governorate, Russian Empire
- Date of death: March 15, 1990 (aged 77)
- Place of death: Kiev, Ukrainian SSR, Soviet Union
- Height: 1.75 m (5 ft 9 in)
- Positions: Outside left; defender

Youth career
- 1925–1927: Raikomvod Kyiv

Senior career*
Years	Team	Apps	(Gls)
1927–1931	Raikomvod Kyiv		
1932–1941	Dynamo Kyiv	110	(10)
1942–1943	Dynamo Kazan		
1944–1947	Dynamo Kyiv	51	(2)

Managerial career
- 1944–1945: Dynamo Kyiv
- 1947–1953: ODO Kiev
- 1954–1958: Youth Football School
- 1959–1961: SKVO Kiev/SKA
- * Club domestic league appearances and goals

Mykola Borysovych Makhynia (Ukrainian: Микола Борисович Махиня; 1912 – 1990) was a Soviet and Ukrainian football player and coach. He was Merited Master of Sports of the Soviet Union (1946) and Merited Coach of the Ukrainian SSR (1962), the author of the first goal for Dynamo Kyiv in the Soviet Top League.

He was born in the family of river captain-instructor Borys Kasianovych Makhynia who eventually commanded big steamboats along the Dnieper. Mykola was the youngest and had two brothers Andriy and Ivan and a sister Yevdokia. Talent for football appeared in all brothers, but only Mykola was able to reach the highest level. While Andriy eventually left football and the highest achievement for Ivan was participation in games of the Kyiv championship in 1920s, Mykola passed all the levels that led to football heights.

Already in 1925 (or 1926) Mykola started to play for teams of local agency "Raikomvod" (or as they were simply called "Vodnyki).
