= FC Dynamo Dnipropetrovsk =

FC Dynamo Dnipropetrovsk (Ukrainian: Динамо Дніпропетровськ) was a former association football team from former Dnipropetrovsk, Ukrainian SSR.

== History ==
The Dynamo society in Dnipropetrovsk (today Dnipro) was established in 1925, the same year the city was renamed abandoning its imperial name Ekaterinoslav. Its football team was named "Gubmilitsiya". Also in 1925 in Ukraine were abandoned Imperial administrative territorial divisions of gubernias and transitioned to okruhas often confused with the Russian similar term okrugs. In 1929 the team was renamed after its parent club, in other sources 1929 is considered to be the establishment date.

It played its games at the Dynamo Stadium in the Dnipro City Shevchenko Park. In 1935 the Dnipro city team that became champions of Ukraine was based mostly on Dynamo Dnipropetrovsk. With introduction of the Soviet club competitions in 1936 it played in groups B and V. Later participated in the Soviet competitions. After World War II, in 1947 Dynamo Dnipropetrovsk was merged with FC Stal Dnipropetrovsk (later FC Dnipro).
