= Mikhail Tovarovsky =

Ukrainian footballer (1903–1969)

Personal information
- Full name: Mikhail Davidovich Tovarovsky
- Date of birth: October 25, 1903
- Place of birth: Orlovets, Kiev Governorate, Russian Empire
- Date of death: January 6, 1969 (aged 65)
- Place of death: Moscow, Soviet Union
- Height: 1.68 m (5 ft 6 in)
- Position: Striker

Youth career
- 1918–1919: KLS Kyiv

Senior career*
Years	Team	Apps	(Gls)
1920–1921	KLS Kyiv		
1922–1926	Zheldor Kyiv		
1927–1928	Radtorhsluzhbovtsi Kyiv		
1928–1929	Zheldor Kyiv		

Managerial career
- 1935–1936: Kyiv city team
- 1935: KVO
- 1935–1937: Dynamo Kyiv
- 1938: Dynamo Moscow
- * Club domestic league appearances and goals as of 12 May 2012

Mikhail (Moisei) Davidovich Tovarovsky (Russian: Михаил (Моисей) Давидович Товаровский) (October 25, 1903 – January 4, 1969) was a Soviet footballer, coach, and sport administrator from Ukraine.

He was Jewish, and played for KLS Kyiv (1918–1921), Lokomotyv Kyiv (1922–1926), Radtorhsluzhbovtsi Kyiv (1927–1928), Dynamo Kyiv (1928–1929) and Lokomotyv Kyiv again (1929–1930). Tovarovsky also played for the collective city team of Kiev from 1921 to 1927 in the All-Ukrainian inter-cities championship.

As a coach, he started in the Kiev army club of Kiev Military District (KVO). Later Tovarovsky coached Dynamo Kyiv from 1935 to 1937 and FC Dynamo Moscow in 1938. Tovarovsky was a USSR Championship bronze medalist in 1937 and was awarded the title of Merited Sports Coach of the USSR in 1947.

From 1939 Tovarovsky worked in the State Central Lenin Order Institute of Physical Culture (GCOLIFK) as an instructor creating there the department of football and hockey in 1962. After World War II, Tovarovsky was a state coach of the All-Union Committee. In 1950s he was a deputy chairman of coaching council of Football Section of the Soviet Union.

Tovarovsky was buried at the Don Cemetery in Moscow.
