= Konstantin Schegotsky =

Soviet footballer and manager

Personal information
- Date of birth: 1 May 1911
- Place of birth: Moscow, Russian Empire
- Date of death: 23 January 1989 (aged 77)
- Place of death: Kyiv, Soviet Union
- Height: 1.73 m (5 ft 8 in)
- Position: Inside forward

Youth career
- 1925–: LPCM Moscow

Senior career*
Years	Team	Apps	(Gls)
1927–1929	Gornyak (Mining Institute)		
1930	Trokhgorka		
1931–1932	AMO Moscow		
1933–1935	Dynamo Kyiv	10	(12)
1935	UPVO (Border and Internal Security Department)		
1936–1938	Dynamo Kyiv	29	(12)
1940–1941	Dynamo Kyiv	22	(8)
1942	Dinamo Kazan		
1943–1945	Dinamo Tashkent		
1946	Kharchovyk Odesa		

International career
1932	Moscow city	1	(0)
1934	Kiev city	9	(4)
1933–1938	Ukraine XI	5	(5)
1933–1935	Soviet Union XI	4	(1)
1943–1945	Uzbekistan XI	10	(20)

Managerial career
- 1945–1946: Kharchovyk Odesa
- 1947: Dinamo Kyiv (assistant)
- 1948: Dinamo Kyiv
- 1949–1951: Spartak Kyiv
- 1954–1957: Torpedo Kyiv
- 1957: Kolhospnyk Rivne
- 1958: Lokomotyv Vinnytsia
- 1959–1960: Shakhtar Stalino
- 1960: Sudnobudivnyk Mykolaiv
- 1966: Horyn Rivne
- * Club domestic league appearances and goals

Konstantin Vasilyevich Shchegotsky (Russian: Константин Васильевич Щегоцкий; April 13, 1911 – January 23, 1989) was a Soviet football player and coach from Moscow.

== Playing career ==
From 1927 to 1929, at the age of 16, Shchegotsky played for Gornyak Moscow, which represented a mining institute. In 1930, he joined Tryokhgorka Moscow with which he won gold medals of Moscow city championship. In 1931-32, Shchegotsky played for Automobile Moscow Society and the collective team of Moscow city.

In 1933, at 21 years of age, Shchegotsky joined Dynamo Kyiv, where he remained until World War II. During that period, he also represented the national team of the Ukrainian SSR. In 1935, at the Kyiv city championship, Shchegotsky appeared for the Border and Internal Security Administration and for the Soviet Union national team in several unofficial games. In 1937, Shchegotsky played a game for Spartak Moscow against visiting Basque team.

== Personal life ==
According to his adopted son Vitaliy, the Schegotsky's last name spells actually as Shegotsky. His actual birth day is May 1, but April 13 is a very common mistake. The father of Shchegotsky was a churchwarden (ktitor) in Orthodox Church and the Shchegotsky's relation to Catholicism is false. Shchegotsky was a Russified Polish man and a few generations native of Moscow, Russian.

On July 22, 1937, for his contribution to the development of sports and in connection with the 20th anniversary of the physical culture movement in the Soviet Union, Shchegotsky was awarded the Order of the Badge of Honor, becoming the first recipient of the award in the history of Dynamo Kyiv. The award was presented to the Dynamo captain in a solemn setting by Mikhail Kalinin in the Kremlin, together with Marshal Vasily Blucher, Academician Vladimir Filatov, sculptor Vera Mukhina.

In August 1938, Shchegotsky was arrested and spent over a year in prison being accused by the Soviet NKVD in the Right-Trotskyism. After his release, Shchegotsky moved to Moscow for rehabilitation and in 1940 returned to play for Dynamo Kyiv.

With the start of the Nazi-Soviet War Shchegotsky was part of the staff in preparation to partisan movement headed by a deputy Narkom Timofei Strokach (native of the Green Ukraine). He was appointed a drill instructor for a paramilitary firefighting team from the Kyivan Mykilska Slobidka. During the Kyiv encirclement Shchegotsky managed to leave the city as part of official evacuation of the city and survived a Nazi bombardment of their retreating columns.

Schegotsky was never a member of the Communist party. He also never received any honoring titles such as Master of Sport.
