= Yevgeny Karelov =

Soviet film director and screenwriter (1931-1977)

- Born: Yevgeny Yefimovich Karelov; 12 October 1931; Bogorodskoye village, Moscow Oblast, USSR
- Died: 11 July 1977 (aged 45); Pitsunda, Abkhaz ASSR, Georgian SSR, USSR
- Occupations: Film director, screenwriter
- Years active: 1955—1976

Yevgeny Yefimovich Karelov (Russian: Евгений Ефимович Карелов; 12 October 1931 — 11 July 1977) was a Soviet film director and screenwriter known for comedy movies, war dramas, and children's films. He was named Meritorious Artist of RSFSR in 1974.

== Biography ==
Karelov was born in the Bogorodskoye village (known as Bogorodskoye urban-type settlement today) into a peasant family, one of the four children. His parents soon moved to Drezna and applied to a secondary school: his mother Maria Andreevna Karelova — as a teacher, and his father Yefim Trofimovich Karelov — as a stoker and gardener. During the early 1950s the family moved to Podolsk.

In 1949 Yevgeny tried to enter VGIK, but failed and entered the regional Pedagogical University, Faculty of Physical Culture. In a year he successfully entered VGIK and in 1955 he finished the directing courses led by Grigori Aleksandrov and started working at Mosfilm. Simultaneously he finished the Pedagogical University and joined the Federation of Sport Movies to promote sports culture. Among his projects was a war drama The Third Half (1962) about The Death Match that happened in the Nazi-occupied Kiev, a TV comedy Seven Old Men and a Girl (1968) about a young coach assigned to train a group of "hopeless" elderly men and a screenplay When I'm a King dedicated to the Soviet ice hockey coach Yuri Ulianov which was made into a documentary after his death.

In 1968 Karelov directed Two Comrades Were Serving where Oleg Yankovsky played one of his first roles (his debut film The Shield and the Sword was released same year). It depicted the events of the Russian Civil War shown from both Red and White perspectives. The White Army poruchik Alexander Brusentsov played by Vladimir Vysotsky turned into one of his biggest movie roles in the entire career. Karelov later returned to revolutionary events with Those Who Saved Fire (1970) and the High Rank dilogy (1973—1974), both with Evgeny Matveev in the lead, director's favourite actor and a close friend.

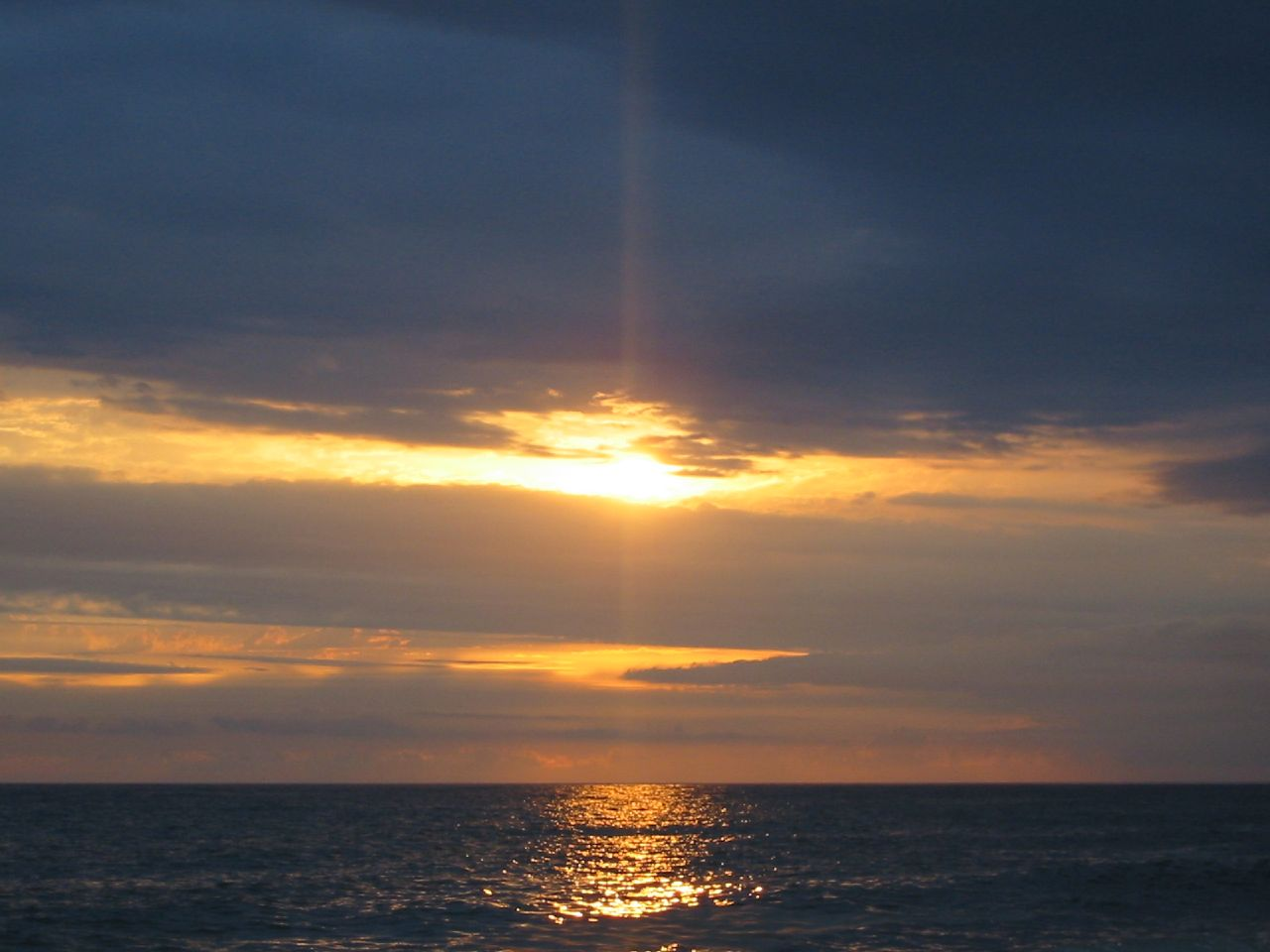
The Black Sea in Pitsunda/Bichvinta, where Karelov's life ended.

Karelov also produced a number of films aimed at children and youth, including Smoke in the Forest (1955) based on the story by Arkady Gaidar and Nakhalyonok (1961) based on Don Tales by Mikhail Sholokhov. In 1965 he directed the family comedy Children of Don Quixote about a goofy head of maternity clinic and his sons. It was among the first leading roles by Anatoly Papanov and the only role by Andrey Belyaninov, the head of the Federal Customs Service of Russia during the 2000s. In 1976 he directed a TV mini-series Two Captains based on the popular children's novel by Veniamin Kaverin who served as a screenwriter and added several scenes along the way.

After the work on Two Captains was finished, the film crew went to Pitsunda to have a rest. On 11 July 1977 Karelov died of heart failure while swimming in the sea. Boris Tokarev and Evgeny Matveev who witnessed it managed to pull out his body, but Karelov was already dead by that time. He was buried in the family tomb at the Podolsk cemetery. He was survived by his wife Tatiana Germanovna Karelova and daughter Marina.

On 4 November 2016 a new boulevard in the memory of Yevgeny Karelov was opened in Podolsk where two monuments were placed: one depicting Karelov, and another — the boy from his Nakhalyonok movie (role performed by Vladimir Semyonov).

== Filmography ==
Year	Title	Original title		
Year	Title	Original title	Director	Screenwriter
1955	Smoke in the Forest	Дым в лесу	✓	
1960	Yasha Toporkov	Яша Топорков	✓	
1960	Let It Shine	Пусть светит	✓	✓
1961	Nakhalyonok	Нахалёнок	✓	
1962	The Third Half	Третий тайм	✓	
1964—1967	Fitil	Фитиль	✓	✓
1965	Children of Don Quixote	Дети Дон Кихота	✓	
1968	Two Comrades Were Serving	Служили два товарища	✓	
1968	Seven Old Men and a Girl	Семь стариков и одна девушка	✓	✓
1970	Those Who Saved Fire	Сохранившие огонь	✓	
1973—1974	High Rank	Высокое звание	✓	✓
1976	Two Captains	Два капитана	✓	✓
1979	When I'm a King	Когда я король		✓
