= Vladimir Bulavin =

Russia military and security official

- Владимир Булавин
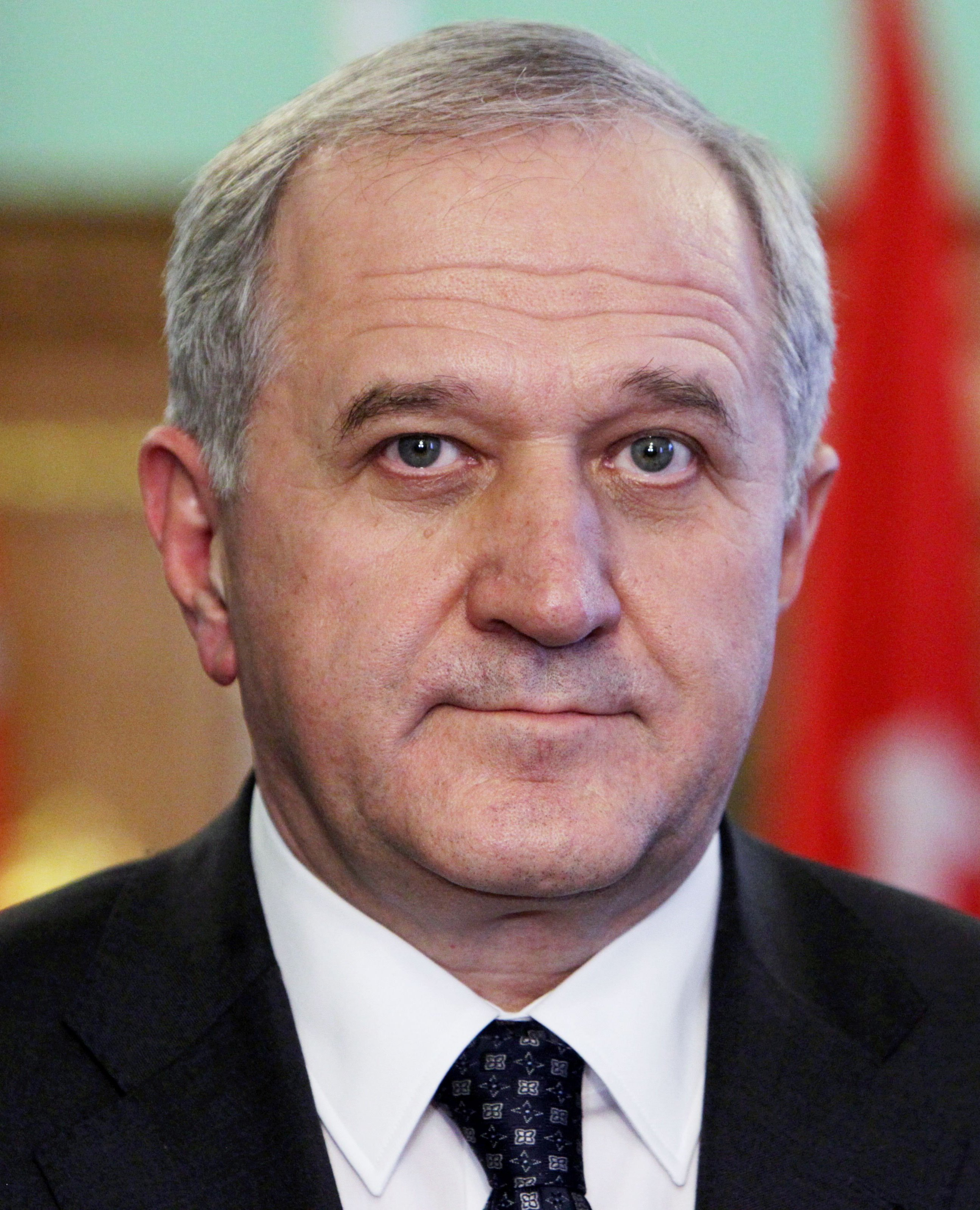
- Bulavin in 2013

Senator from Ivanovo Oblast
- Incumbent
- Assumed office 19 September 2023
- Preceded by: Valery Vasilyev

Director of the Federal Customs Service
- In office 28 July 2016 – 10 February 2023
- Prime Minister: Dmitry Medvedev; Mikhail Mishustin
- Preceded by: Andrey Belyaninov
- Succeeded by: Ruslan Davydov (acting); Valery Pikalyov

5th Presidential Envoy to the Northwestern Federal District
- In office 11 March 2013 – 28 July 2016
- President: Vladimir Putin
- Preceded by: Nikolay Vinnichenko
- Succeeded by: Nikolay Tsukanov

Personal details
- Born: 11 February 1953 (age 73) Stanovoye, Russia, Soviet Union
- Education: Moscow State University of Railway Engineering, Academy of the Federal Security Service of the Russia Federation
- Occupation: Security official

Vladimir Ivanovich Bulavin (Russian: Владимир Иванович Булавин; born 11 February 1953) is a Russian military and security official, who served as the Head of the Federal Customs Service of the Russian Federation between 2016 and 2023.

== Biography ==
Bulavin was born Lipetsk Oblast, Russia.

Before graduating in Academy of the Federal Security Service, he had worked with Voskhod as a constructor engineer in 1977 and in 1977, he joined State security commission serving in the Russian administration office in Ministry of Security and Administration of the Federal Counter-intelligence Service in 1979 and Administration of the Federal Security Service of Novgorod Region and was also presidential plenipotentiary representative of Northwest Federal district by Vladimir Putin.

In 2016, he was appointed head of the Federal Customs Service. In February 2023, he was dismissed at the age of 70.

According to media reports, after the September 2023 elections, Bulavin is predicted to have a seat in the Federation Council (Senate).

=== Sanctions ===
He was sanctioned by the UK government in 2022 in relation to the Russo-Ukrainian War.

In response to the 2022 Russian invasion of Ukraine, on 6 April 2022 the Office of Foreign Assets Control of the United States Department of the Treasury added Bulavin to its list of persons sanctioned pursuant to Executive Order 14024. On 25 February 2023, the European Union imposed sanctions against Bulavin due to his efforts to undermine trade and customs restrictions by securing parallel imports into Russia, and for exercising direct authority over customs processes and imposing Russia's customs code in the illegally annexed territories of Donetsk, Luhansk, Kherson, and Zaporizhzhia.
