= Makar Honcharenko =

Ukrainian footballer (1912–1997)

Personal information
- Full name: Makar Mykhaylovych Honcharenko
- Date of birth: 5 April 1912
- Place of birth: Kiev, Russian Empire
- Date of death: 1 April 1997 (aged 84)
- Place of death: Kyiv, Ukraine
- Height: 1.61 m (5 ft 3 in)
- Position: Forward

Youth career
- 1929: Kommunalnik

Senior career*
| Years | Team | Apps | (Gls) |
| 1931–1932 | ZhelDor Kyiv | | |
| 1932–1934 | Tekstilshchik Ivanovo | | |
| 1935–1939 | Dynamo Kyiv | 77 | (27) |
| 1940 | Lokomotyv Kyiv | 10 | (3) |
| 1941 | Spartak Odesa | 3 | (0) |
| 1942 | Start Kyiv | | |
| 1945 | Dynamo Kyiv | 5 | (0) |
| 1946 | Chornomorets Odesa | 15 | (2) |
| 1947 | Spartak Kherson | | |

Managerial career
- 1962: Avanhard Zhovti Vody
- * Club domestic league appearances and goals

Makar Mykhaylovych Honcharenko (Ukrainian: Макар Михайлович Гончаренко), (5 April 1912 – 1 April 1997) was a Ukrainian football player and coach. During his career, he played as a forward for a number of clubs, but most noticeably for Dynamo Kyiv. Honcharenko is best known for being the last surviving player of The Death Match.

== Biography ==
Honcharenko was born in Kiev, Russian Empire in a poor working family. In order to help his family, he had to repair footwear early in his childhood. All his free time was dedicated to football.

His career started in 1929. when he started playing for a junior football team of the factory Kommunalnik. Then he played for a Dombalya tram factory team. After that he moved to ZhelDor, where he became a first choice player in 1931.

In the autumn of 1934 Sergey Bartminskiy, the former deputy of the Ukrainian SSR State Political Directorate forced Honcharenko to move to Ivanovo where he started playing for the local Dynamo. On 3 August 1933 he participated in a match between Dynamo and Turkey national team. His team won 7–3. In the same year he played for RSFSR team and was named one of the best 33 football players in USSR and the second best right winger.

In 1934 he returned to Kyiv and started playing for Dynamo Kyiv. In 1935 he played for Kyiv city team in the USSR championship. After that he was called to the Ukrainian SSR team.

He played a football player in a film called The Goalkeeper, which was shot in 1936.

1938 was the best year of his career. Honcharenko was awarded The Best Scorer of the USSR football championship after he scored 19 goals in 24 matches, but was excluded from The best 33 USSR football players.

The 1939 season was a failure - Honcharenko scored only twice in 23 games. After this season he left Dynamo for Lokomotiv Kyiv. In 1941 he moved to Spartak Odessa. He only made three appearances before the war came.

=== The Death Match ===
During the Nazi occupation of Kyiv he lived with his mother-in-law and was a member of a sport society Rukh. The members of Rukh were loyal to the new civil administration, which made it possible to work legally, receive rations, and, most importantly, to avoid being arrested and sent to Germany.

Soon he was found by Nikolai Trusevich and was offered a workplace at the bakery #1, where he was able to play for a factory football team Start Kyiv.

In June 1942 Start was allowed to organise friendly games in Kyiv. Honcharenko played in what was later called the Death Match by Soviet propaganda and was soon arrested. First, he was held in solitary confinement by the Gestapo, then, in September 1942 he was transferred to Syrets concentration camp. There along with M. Sviridovskiy he was repairing boots for German soldiers.

In September 1943 he escaped from the camp and returned home, where his neighbours helped him to hide.

=== Post WWII ===
After the war he was inspected by NKVD and was allowed to join Dynamo Kyiv.

In 1946 he played for Pischevik Odessa for one year, then he moved to Spartak Kherson where he retired.

After the retirement he worked as a coach in Odesa, Sumy, Lviv, Kherson and Kyiv. In 1962 he was appointed the manager of FC Avangard (Zhyoltyye Vody).

After the dissolution of the USSR, critics had begun to question the accuracy of Soviet narratives around The Death Match, as it had become a propaganda tool. By 1992, Honcharenko was the last surviving player. That year, Honcharenko gave a radio interview where he shared his experience of playing under occupation.

Honcharenko died in Kyiv, Ukraine.

== Honours ==
=== Team ===
- Silver medallist of the USSR Championship: 1936 (Spring)
- Bronze medallist of the Soviet Union Championship: 1937
- Ukrainian SSR Cup champion: 1937, 1938
- Champion of the Ukrainian SSR: 1936
- Silver medallist of the Russian Soviet Federative Socialist Republic: 1934
- Medal "For the Defence of Kiev"

=== Personal ===
- The best scorer of the USSR championship: 1938 (19)

== Remembrance ==
In September 1964, the Presidium of the Supreme Soviet of the USSR awarded Honcharenko the Medal for Battle Merit.
