= Haidari concentration camp =

German concentration camp in present day Greece

Coordinates: 38.017°N 23.657°E

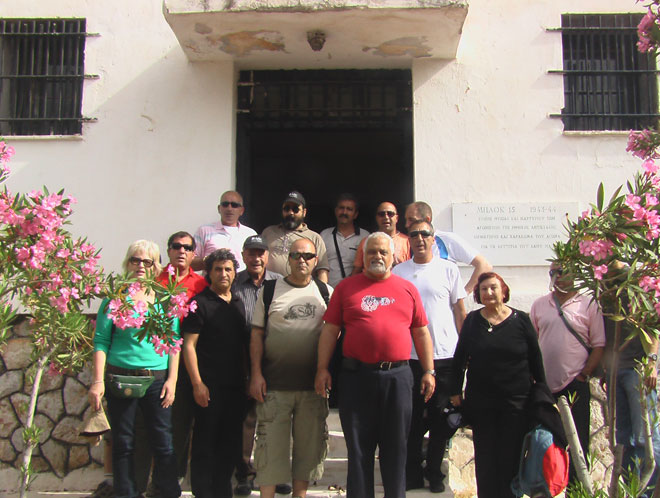
Survivors of the camp and family members in front of the Block 15 building, 2009

The Haidari concentration camp (Greek: στρατόπεδο συγκέντρωσης Χαϊδαρίου, romanized: stratópedo syngéntrosis Chaidaríou; German: KZ Chaidari) was a concentration camp operated by the German Schutzstaffel at the Athens suburb of Haidari during the Axis occupation of Greece in World War II. Operating from September 1943 until it was shut down in September 1944, it was the largest and most notorious concentration camp in wartime Greece, becoming known as the "Bastille of Greece".

It was a transit camp established on the grounds of a Greek Army barracks, and it is estimated that in the one year of its operation, some 21,000 people passed through it, including Jews, Italian POWs and Greek political prisoners. The majority of these was transported north, to Auschwitz in the case of the Jews, or to forced labour in Germany, while others were detained for questioning by the Gestapo. It is estimated that ca. 2,000 inmates were executed there during the camp's operation.

== Establishment ==
Following the German invasion of Greece in April 1941 and until September 1943, most of Greece was under Italian occupation. The Italians had inherited the Greek pre-war prisons, which housed a great number of political prisoners, and established a number of concentration camps of their own in southern Greece. As the tide of the war turned against the Axis in the spring of 1943, the Italians decided to move the inmates to more secure locations: the inmates of the Acronauplia and Trikala prisons were transferred to Larissa. However, the mounting Greek Resistance movement in the countryside forced them to transport a large number to Attica. On 29 August 1943, 600 prisoners, including 243 Communists who had been imprisoned since before the war by the Metaxas Regime, were sent from Larissa to Athens. they arrived on 3 September, and were housed in the Haidari barracks. The regime in the camp was rather easy-going at first: visits and post were allowed, the inmates were not confined to their rooms, and did not have to perform manual labour. Italian control over Haidari was short-lived, however: on 8 September, Italy surrendered to the Allies, and on 10 September, the Germans took over the camp.

=== Description of the camp ===
The notorious "Block 15" in the 1950s. Built before the war as a military prison, it became the camp's strict solitary confinement building. Cramped conditions, absence of basic sanitation, isolation from the outside world and the guards' brutality affected the inmates' health and sanity.

The camp was originally built as an army barracks which had never been finished, and its structures were looted in 1941. As a result, it was in poor shape when the first prisoners started arriving at the beginning of September 1943, and the situation would deteriorate further in the months to come, when the camp came under German control. The camp had a roughly rectangular shape, surrounded by a triple barbed wire fence, with guard towers at every 200 m (660 ft). The camp's gate was on the western side of the fence. Most buildings were clustered on the northern half of the camp. Blocks 1 to 4 were located there, built in a staggered line towards the East. These were two-storey barracks buildings, divided in two equal but separate sections, western and eastern, with separate entrances to each. In addition, the north-eastern corner housed storage houses, the mess hall, the baths (Block 16), where the women's solitary confinement cells were also located, the workshops (Block 21) and the camp headquarters (Block 20). The infamous Block 15, located to the east of the headquarters, was the solitary confinement facility, with the camp guard's quarters and mess room. In the south-eastern corner there was the isolated women's wing (Block 6). Under the Germans, the first floor housed Jewish women, while the second floor was reserved for Christians. In total, over 300 Christian and 2,500 Jewish women passed through Haidari beginning on 7 December 1943, including heroines of the Resistance such as Iro Konstantopoulou or Lela Karagianni (executed on 5 and 8 September 1944 respectively).

== Under the Germans ==
The new German commandant, sergeant Rudi Trepte, quickly imposed a more rigid regime, with prisoners confined to their rooms in their free time, and visits were restricted to once a month. Meanwhile, the camp's population began to grow: 300 prisoners from Kalamata arrived in October, and 400 were transferred from the Averof prisons in early November. However, Trepte and his two Greek translators were soon arrested by the Gestapo, for reasons as yet unknown. After a few days, the camp passed under the authority of the SS, and the Sturmbannführer Paul Radomski.

Radomski was an "Old Fighter" of the Nazi Party, and one of the early companions of the feared security chief Reinhard Heydrich in Hamburg. However, he was considered as brutal even by his fellow SS officers. His personal file called him "primitive", and as commander of the Syrets concentration camp near Kiev he led a terror regime, ordering severe punishments for the smallest infractions, and often personally shooting or whipping the inmates, a habit he carried over at Haidari.

Under Radomski, the camp inmates were put to labour in two four-hour shifts each day except Sundays. The inmates were divided into groups of 100 men, with a hecatontarch in charge of each. However, the labour was not intended for any productive purposes, but merely to break the prisoners' morale: they were made to dig holes and then refill them, build walls and then break them down.

An account by an eyewitness, Constantine Vatikiotis, who was arrested on 26 October 1943, describes Radomski personally executing a Jewish prisoner called Levy, in front of the other prisoners, "for attempting to escape on the day of his arrest". This execution was to serve not only as a warning to the others, but, according to post-war psychological research, to "put the inmates in constant fear of their lives". Vatikiotis estimated that in the few months he was at Haidari some 2,000 people were executed. Another 300 died as a result of torture either at Haidari or in the Gestapo headquarters at Merlin street in central Athens. These numbers included 30 women, 104 invalids, and 230 students.

Radomski was relieved of his post in February 1944, after he threatened to shoot his own adjutant while drunk, and was replaced by Lieutenant Karl Fischer. Fischer reversed his predecessor's policies: instead of Radomski's brutal treatment, he relied on informants and spies among the prisoners. Despite the somewhat relaxed atmosphere, Fischer also oversaw the period of most activity on the camp: during spring and summer 1944, the Germans engaged in constant razzias, blockades and mass arrests in Athens, and the camp's inmate population peaking at several thousands in August, barely two months before Liberation. Several hundred of the people captured in these round-ups were then transported to Germany for forced labour.

German reprisal policies also saw a sharp rise in executions, most famously the case of the 200 Communists who were executed on 1 May 1944 at Kaisariani as a retaliation for the ambush and murder, by ELAS partisans, of German General Franz Krech at Molaoi in Laconia.

In March, the Germans also imprisoned several prominent politicians, whom they suspected of contacts with the British. These included the former Prime Ministers Georgios Kaphantaris, Themistoklis Sophoulis and Stylianos Gonatas, all leaders of the pre-war Liberal Party. The Athens SiPo/SD chief, Walter Blume, intended to execute them, along with other public figures, as the German army would withdraw, leaving the country in turmoil. In the end, Blume's "Chaos Thesis" was dismissed by his superiors, and the politicians were released in early September. Blume was arrested and convicted at the Einsatzgruppen trial but released in 1955; he died in 1974.

=== Jews at Haidari ===
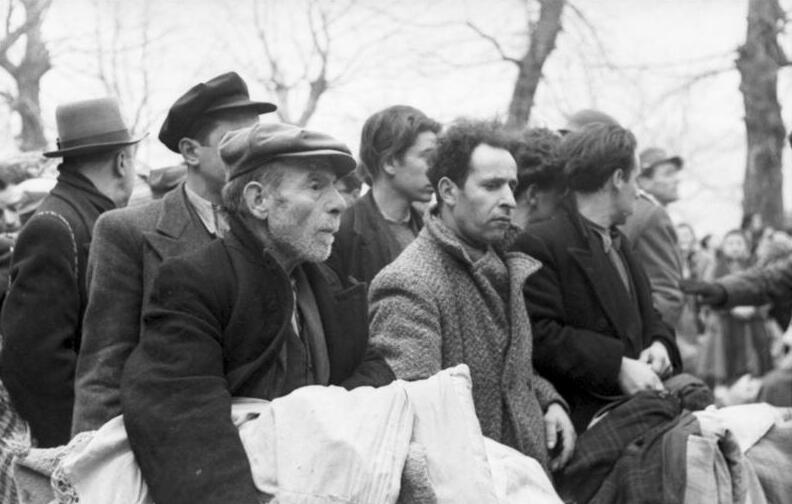
Jews during the deportation of the Jewish population of Ioannina on 25 March 1944. Almost all of the Jews deported from the former Italian zone were killed within days of their arrival at Auschwitz-Birkenau in April.

Even though the Germans had already deported the Jews of Thessaloniki, which lay under their jurisdiction since 1941, they did not immediately move against the Jews of the formerly Italian zone. The first Jews arrived at Haidari on 4 December 1943, and were isolated in the basement of Block 3, but their number increased only slowly. The first mass arrivals came about in late March 1944, as the Germans moved simultaneously against Jewish communities throughout Greece. In these operations, Haidari served as the central transit camp to the extermination camps in Central Europe: on 23 March, about 700 to 1,000 members of the Athens community were rounded up and taken to Haidari, followed days later by 614 Jews from Epirus and Western Greece, including Jews with foreign passports. In early June, 1,850 Jews from the Ionian Islands arrived, and as late as 1 August, 1,700 Jews from Rhodes and the Dodecanese. All these were transported to Auschwitz.

== Post-war history and commemoration ==
Since the late 1940s, the camp has been used by the Greek Army, which established an infantry heavy weapons (ΚΕΒΟΠ) and a communications school (ΚΕΔ) on the grounds. Notably, in the 1950s, Block 15 was again used as a detention facility. However, following the Left's defeat in the Greek Civil War, public commemoration of locations associated with its role in the Greek Resistance was banned. Haidari, which was strongly associated with the 200 Communists executed on 1 May 1944, and a functioning Army base, was therefore off limits for several decades. Only in the 1980s, with the election of the socialist PASOK party to power and the passing of laws on the recognition of the Resistance and on national reconciliation, was the camp opened to annual commemoration events. Block 15 has since been declared a national monument site, and features in the logo of the Haidari municipality.

== Sources ==
- "Δήμος Χαϊδαρίου: Ιστορική Αναδρομή" (in Greek). Haidari Municipality. Archived from the original on 24 September 2015.
- Mazower, Mark (1995). Inside Hitler's Greece: The Experience of Occupation, 1941-44. Yale University Press. ISBN 0-300-08923-6.
- Muñoz, Antonio (2018). The German Secret Field Police in Greece, 1941-1944. McFarland. ISBN 978-1476667843.
