= Mikhail Petrovich Sidko =

Ukrainian engineer and inventor

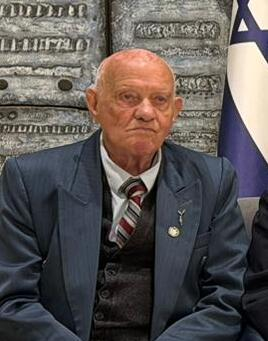
- Sidko, 2026
- Born: 1936 (age 89–90); Kyiv, Ukrainian SSR
- Occupation: Engineer

Mikhail Petrovich Sidko (born 1936, Kyiv) is a chemical engineer, inventor, and honoured innovator of the Ukrainian SSR. He is the last living survivor of the Babi Yar massacre.

== Biography ==
The family of Mikhail Sidko was to be evacuated by train to the east, but his brother Grisha left the train to let out the family's pigeons, which were still in their dovecote. When Grisha did not return, Sidko's mother (Bertha) took her other three children off the train to search for him. Sidko's father, who was elsewhere on the train, was the only member of the family who remained.

On 28 September 1941, 2,000 flyers in Russian were posted in Kyiv, Ukrainian and German: “All the Jews of the city of Kyiv and its environs should appear Monday 29 September 1941 by 8 o'clock in the morning at the corner of Melnikovskaya and Degtyarnaya streets (near the cemetery). Take your documents with you, valuables, as well as warm clothes and underwear. Those who do not comply with this order will be shot".

Neighbours convinced Sidko's mother not to go to the gathering place, since her husband and children were Ukrainian. Instead, the family remained at home.

On 30 September, Lushka, the family's housekeeper, informed the Germans that the family were Jewish and did not comply with the orders posted on 28 September. The family was sent to Babi Yar. The family joined a column of Jews being led by a German officer and a policeman. Eventually, Mikhail, his brother, and several children were pulled out of the column by the policeman. He shouted: "rozbigaytes", shot in the air, and killed two men. The rest of the column fled home.

A week later, the housekeeper Lushka again handed the family over to the Gestapo. Their neighbour, Ivan Volksdeutsch, was the interpreter for the Gestapo. He told the Germans that Mikhail and his brother were Ukrainians, and they were released.

Later, a neighbour settled with them – Sofia Krivorot-Baklanova with her daughter Galina. During the raids, Sofya Kondratyevna said, that Mikhail and his brother are her children, daughter – that they are her brothers. In 2004, the title of Righteous Among the Nations was awarded to Galina Elizarovna and Sofya Krivorot-Baklanova (posthumously).

Mikhail and his brother were stealing coal at the railway station, were caught and ended up in the Syrets death camp, where medical experiments were performed on them: their feet were frozem, exposed to encephalitis ticks, and given injections. In the winter of 1942–1943, Grisha fled and in 1943 he kidnapped Mikhail.

After the war, Mikhail Sidko completed his studies at school, and from the age of 13 he worked as a shoemaker, served in the army and settled in Cherkasy, where he worked at a chemical plant. After retirement he immigrated to Israel in 2000.

== Links ==
- Interview with Mikhail Sidko (video) https://www.youtube.com/watch?v=SJzV7QOWHnA
