= Iro Konstantopoulou =

Greek resistance member during WWII

- Ηρώ Κωνσταντοπούλου
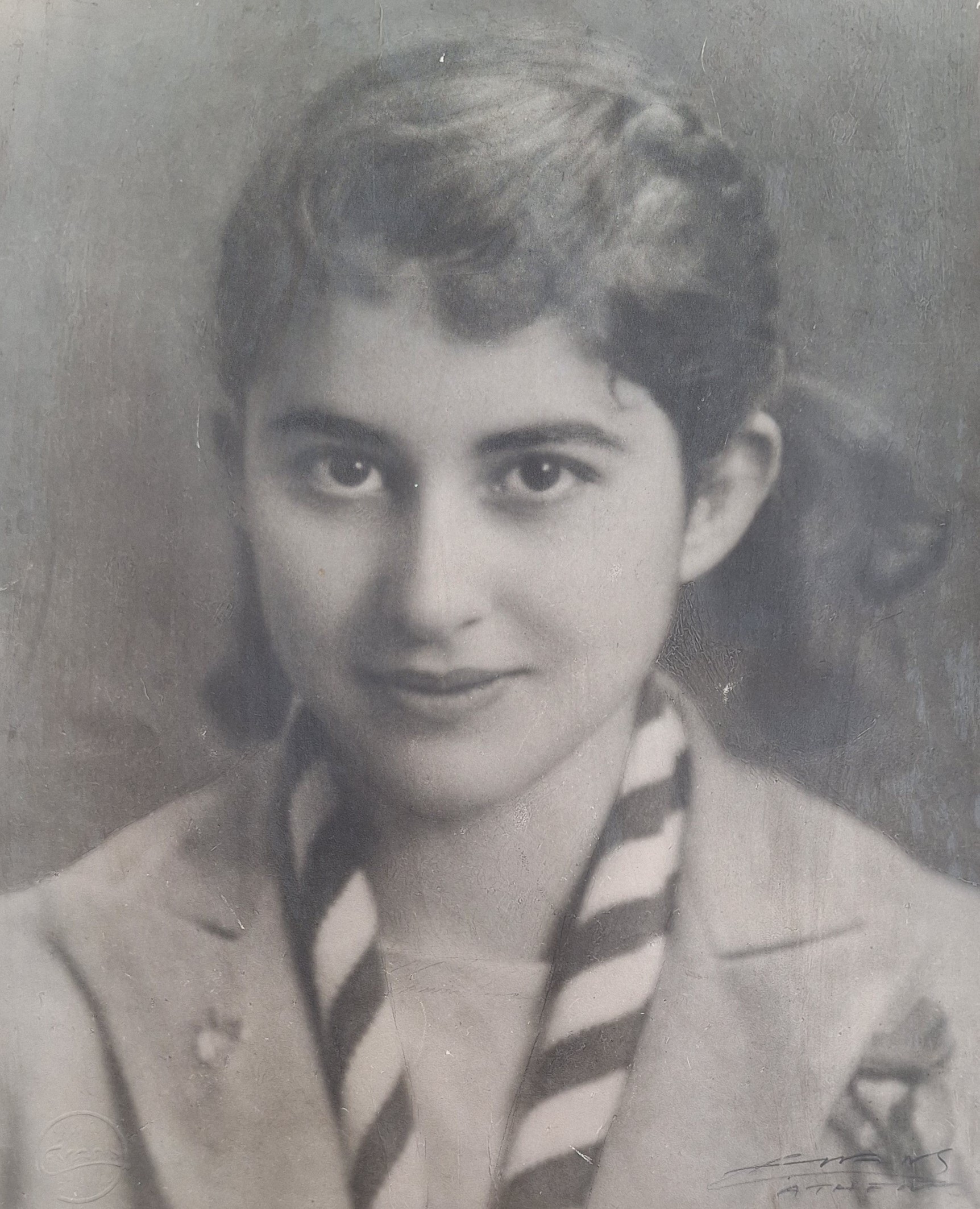
- Iro Konstantopoulou at the age of 13
- Born: July 16, 1927; Athens, Greece
- Died: September 5, 1944 (aged 17)
- Cause of death: Execution by firing squad
- Organization: EPON
- Known for: Greek resistance member

Iro Konstantopoulou (Greek: Ηρώ Κωνσταντοπούλου [iˈro konstadoˈpulu]; 1927–1944) was a member of the Greek resistance during World War II. She worked with the resistance in Greece to oppose the Axis occupation of the country for three years before being captured, tortured, and executed in September 1944.

== Biography ==
Konstantopoulou was born into a wealthy Greek family in 1927. She was 13 when the Axis powers invaded and occupied Greece during the Second World War. Iro joined the United Panhellenic Organization of Youth, a Greek resistance movement, in which she worked to steal messages and monitor troop movements. She was caught performing these activities, but was able to avoid punishment due to her father bribing local authorities.

In early 1944 Iro was involved in a successful resistance operation to blow up a train carrying ammunition; soon after, a double agent working within the Greek resistance revealed her identity to the German occupational forces. Iro was arrested on her way home from high school on 31 July 1944; according to one source, she had finished her final high school exams that morning. She was subjected to several days of torture, but refused to divulge the names of her fellow resistance members. As a German speaker, Iro was noted as having been able to insult her captors in their own language. Following her interrogation, she was transported to the Haidari concentration camp just outside of Athens where she was held with many other members of the resistance including resistance leader Lela Karagianni. Iro and 49 other members of the resistance were executed at the camp by firing squad on 5 September 1944, just 37 days before the German occupying forces left Athens under the pressure of Greek resistance and prior to the landing of a combined force of British and regular Greek army units.

It is said that on the morning of her execution, as she was being taken by camp guards, Lela Karagianni (who would be executed 3 days later) told her proudly, "Well done, my Iro. This is how Greek women die." (Greek: «Μπράβο, Ηρώ μου. Έτσι πεθαίνουν οι Ελληνίδες.»). Many sources also report that Iro's body was shot 17 times, one bullet for each year of her life, as a warning to other members of the resistance.

=== Legacy ===
Konstantopoulou's actions during the war were commemorated by a statue of a young girl in Terpsithea Square in Piraeus. In 1981, Iro's life was depicted in the Greek film 17 Bullets for an Angel: The True Story of Hero Konstantopoulou.
