= The Death Match =

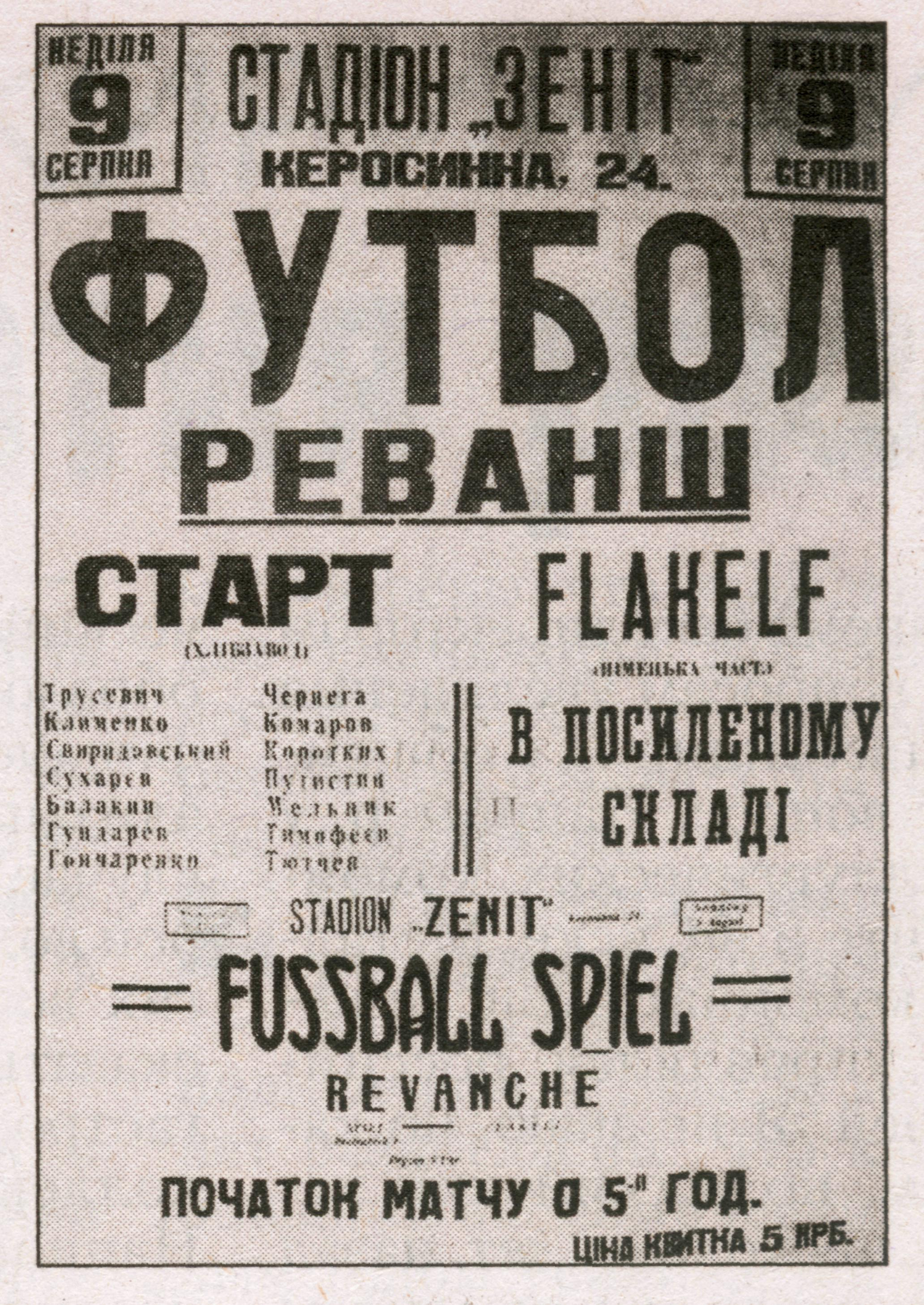
- The official poster about the 9 August 1942 match printed by the German administration
Start	Flakelf
5	3
- Date: 9 August 1942
- Venue: Zenith Stadium, Kiev, Reichskommissariat Ukraine

The Death Match (Ukrainian: Матч смерті, Russian: Матч смерти) is a name given in postwar Soviet historiography to the football match played on 9 August 1942 in Kiev in Reichskommissariat Ukraine following the German invasion of the Soviet Union. The Kiev city team Start (Cyrillic: Старт), which represented the city's Bread Factory No. 1, played several football games in World War II. The team was composed mostly of former professional footballers of Dynamo Kiev and Lokomotiv Kiev, all of whom were forced to work at the factory under the Nazi occupation authority and were made to produce bread for German soldiers.

On 6 August 1942, FC Start played against the German team Flakelf, (Note: "Flakelf" is an abbreviated combination of the German words Flak (Fliegerabwehrkanone – air defense artillery) and elf – "eleven" which was used to denote an association football team.) and won 5–1. A rematch (revanche) was played on 9 August 1942 in the Zenith Stadium, with an estimated 2,000 spectators in attendance, each paying five karbovanets, in which Start again beat Flakelf 5–3.

According to later Soviet myths used for war-time propaganda, some or all players of the Kiev city team were allegedly arrested and executed for humiliating the German players with a double defeat, while some surviving players were persecuted for alleged collaboration with the Germans. In the mid-1960s, the official Soviet narrative changed, formally recognising four deceased players and five surviving players as brave Soviet citizens resisting the German occupation. After the dissolution of the Soviet Union in the 1990s, reconstructions were made of how the match and its aftermath went, which Start players had survived and how, and it was found that the deaths of the other Start players (who were arrested and executed or otherwise died during the war) were unrelated to the supposed "Death Match" of 9 August 1942.

== Background ==
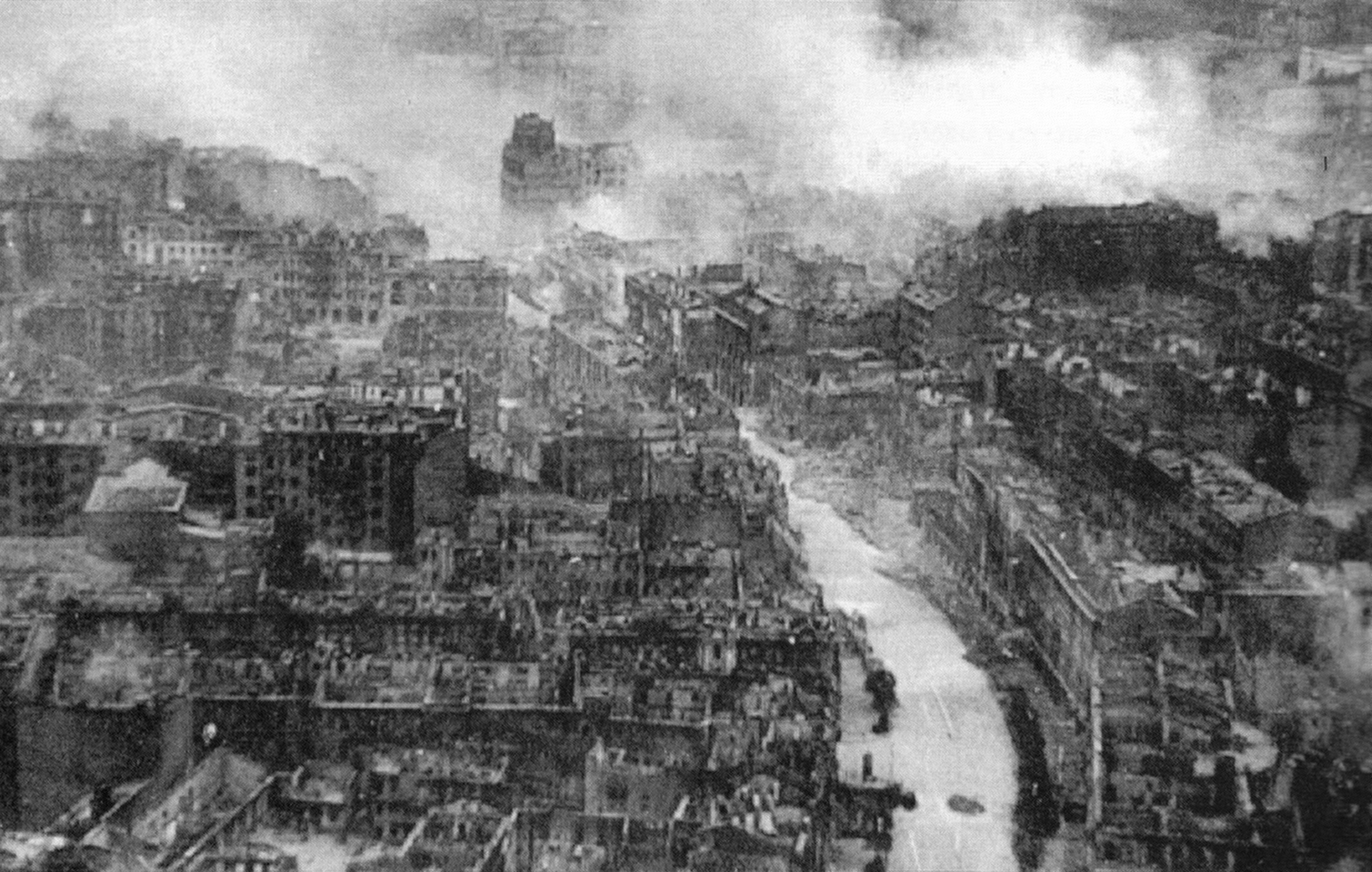
1941 Khreshchatyk bombings (Note: Khreshchatyk was blown up by the withdrawing Soviet troops.)

A Kiev native, Georgiy Kuzmin, points out in his book Facts and fiction of our football (Были и небыли нашего футбола) that the first squads of Dynamo Kiev included a number of regular Cheka members, among whom was Kostiantyn Fomin. Kostiantyn Fomin is known to have participated in repressions against Kharkov sportsmen of Polish descent during 1935–1936. Prior to World War II, Fomin also played for Lokomotiv Kiev.

Because players were not getting paid regularly, the football team of Dynamo for some time had a shortage of playing staff (only eight players). The team's captain Konstantin Shchegotsky even tried to escape to Dnipropetrovsk, where he played for FC Dynamo Dnipropetrovsk, but was forced to come back. During the Holodomor in 1932–33, half of the team escaped to Ivanovo near Moscow. Two of Dynamo's players, Piontkovsky and Sviridovsky, were arrested by NKVD agents during an attempt to exchange several cuts of cloth for products and therefore had to work "for the good of the country" for two years in a penal colony. During the Great Purge in 1938, Piontkovsky, and one of the Dynamo's team creators, Barminsky were targeted, and eventually shot in 1941. The season was never completed, as Germany invaded the Soviet Union on 22 June 1941. Several Dynamo Kiev players joined the military and went off to fight. The initial success of the Wehrmacht allowed it to capture the city from the Red Army in September 1941. Several of the Dynamo Kiev players who had survived the onslaught found themselves in prisoner-of-war camps.

In taking Kiev, the Germans captured over 600,000 Soviet soldiers. The city was under a strict occupation regime; a curfew on civilians was enforced, and universities and schools were shut down. Ukrainian youth over 15 years and adults under 60 years old were submitted to labour obligations. Thousands of inhabitants were deported to Germany for forced labour.

== Historical accounts and analysis after the dissolution of the USSR ==
After the dissolution of the Soviet Union, journalists and historians in the new state of Ukraine were able to make detailed historical research without being controlled by Glavlit, the Soviet censorship agency.

=== Eyewitnesses ===
The 50th anniversary of the "Death Match" in 1992 marked the beginning of eyewitness reports in Ukrainian mass media:

- Kiev Radio broadcast an interview with former Dynamo player Makar Honcharenko, who denied the version that the players were threatened by an SS officer: "Nobody from the official administration blackmailed us for giving up the match."
- Sport reporter Georgi Kuzmin published a series of articles entitled "The Truth about the Death Match". According to him the creation of the "Death Match" legend was a countermeasure of Soviet propaganda to the reproach that the inhabitants of Kiev "did not fight against the aggressor".
- Writer Oleg Yasinsky published his report "Did the Death Match happen?" Being a youth, Yasinsky was among the spectators of the match and later played on Dynamo's youth team.
- Vladlen Putistin, son of midfielder Mikhail Putistin, an ethnic Russian, being eight years old at the time of the match, was one of the ball boys during the match. Later he interviewed (unofficially) some of the players.

All these reports contradicted aspects of the Soviet version: There were no SS officers being referees or threatening the Start team. The German team played a normal game and were fair, nor did the referee attempt to manipulate the match. There were no heavily armed soldiers with dogs in the stadium. The red jerseys worn by the Start players were not specifically intended as a symbol for communist spirit; rather the players were simply given them to wear by the Germans. Indeed, the Germans arrested nine of the Start players, however the first arrest was not until nine days after the match. Five, not four, players were murdered by the SS, three of them six months after the match took place. All the eyewitnesses denied the version that the Dynamo players were murdered specifically as revenge for the German defeat in the game.

=== Historical research ===
The first genuine historical studies of the "Death Match" confirmed the reports of the eyewitnesses. The former general lieutenant of justice, Volodymyr Pristaiko, having been vice chief of the Ukrainian Security Service (SBU), summoned his analysis of the papers documenting the arrest and death of the Dynamo players: "There was definitively no context to the match." In his 2006 book, he published NKVD papers concerning FC Start from 1944 to 1948 as well as KGB documents from the Brezhnev era.

Historian Volodymyr Hynda showed that defeats of German teams against local clubs happened regularly. The Ukrainian press, controlled by the Germans, published many reports about these matches. Hynda found information about 150 matches and documented the results of 111 among them: the Ukrainians won 60 matches and lost 36 matches, 15 were draws.

== History of FC Start ==
Articles published in the daily Nove ukrainske Slovo ("New Ukrainian Word"), controlled by the Germans, the reports of the witnesses and the NKVD documentation allow a reconstruction of FC Start's history.

=== Squad ===
Note: Flags indicate national team as defined under FIFA eligibility rules; some limited exceptions apply. Players may hold more than one non-FIFA nationality.

No.	Pos.	Nation	Player
1	GK	UKR	Mykola Trusevych
2	MF	UKR	Oleksiy Klymenko
3	MF	UKR	Ivan Kuzmenko
4	DF	UKR	Mykhailo Svyrydovskyi
5	MF	UKR	Mykola Korotkykh
6	MF	UKR	Fedir Tyutchev
7	MF	RUS	Mikhail Putistin
18	FW	UKR	Lev Hundarev

No.	Pos.	Nation	Player
8	MF	RUS	**Vasiliy Sukharev**
9	DF	UKR	Volodymyr Balakin
10	FW	UKR	Mykhailo Melnyk
11	FW	UKR	**Makar Honcharenko**
14	FW	RUS	Pavel Komarov
15	DF	UKR	Yuriy Cherneha
17	DF	UKR	**Petro Sotnyk**
20	DF	RUS	Georgiy Timofeev

In bold are players of FC Lokomotiv Kiev.

=== Organisation of the bakery team ===
Under German occupation, all Soviet organisations and clubs were dissolved. By the end of 1941, German administration allowed newly formed Ukrainian sport clubs. In January 1942, football trainer and sport reporter Georgi Dmitrievich Shvetsov founded the club Rukh (Movement). He tried to engage the best players in Kiev.

But most of the former Dynamo players, among them the very popular goalkeeper Trusevich, did not want to play in Rukh, probably because they took Shvetsov for a collaborateur. Trusevich found a job in the Bakery No. 1 which guaranteed their workers and their families normal supplies of food. More former Dynamo players found jobs in the bakery. The German director Joseph Kordik, an engineer from Moravia, encouraged them to form a football team: FC Start. After World War II Kordik declared to the NKVD that in reality he was Czech, not German.

Three players of the former club Lokomotiv Kiev were incorporated into the new team. Four former players who were directly submitted to the German administration also played for Start: three Ukrainian policemen and one engine driver of the German railways Reichsbahn in Kiev. None amongst the Start players had played for the Dynamo team in the years immediately before the war, although some of them had left the club only a couple of years before.

=== Matches in June and July 1942 ===
Seven Start matches are documented for June and July 1942: against the Ukrainian teams Rukh and Sport, three Hungarian military teams, a team of the German artillery and the German railway team RSG. FC Start won all these matches, scoring 37 goals in total and conceding only 8.

=== Match against Flakelf on 6 August 1942 ===
On 6 August 1942, FC Start beat Flakelf scoring 5–1. The names of the German players are given in cyrillic letters on the poster: Harer, Danz, Schneider, Biskur, Scharf, Kaplan, Breuer, Arnold, Jannasch, Wunderlich, Hofmann.

=== Rematch against Flakelf on 9 August 1942 ===
With 2000 spectators present, the teams met again three days later, in the later so-called "Death Match". The poster informed that Flakelf had a "strengthened" team, but did not reveal any names. But it named 14 Start players, amongst them Lev Gundarev, Georgi Timofeyev and Olexander Tkachenko, who were Ukrainian policemen under German command.

The final score was 5–3 in favour of Start. Only the first half of the match is documented: The Germans opened the score but Ivan Kuzmenko, and Makar Honcharenko scoring twice, made the score 3–1 at half time. After the match a German took a photograph of both teams, showing an apparently relaxed atmosphere. Some days later he offered a copy to former Lokomotiv player Volodymyr Balakin. This photograph was never published during Soviet times.

Afterwards the winners drank a glass of self-made vodka and met at a party in the evening.

=== Arrest of the players ===
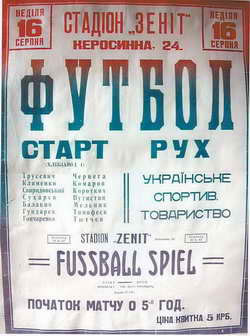
Official poster for the 16 August 1942 Start–Rukh match

On 16 August 1942, FC Start beat Rukh scoring 8–0. Two days later, on 18 August, the Gestapo arrested six of the Start players in the bakery and two days later two others were arrested.

== The fates of the Kiev players ==
In contradiction to the Soviet version, not all of the Start players were prosecuted by the Gestapo. After the war, Soviet authorities punished some of them for collaboration with the Germans.

=== In Gestapo jail ===
According to the archives, some of the Start players said during the NKVD interrogation that they had been denounced to the Gestapo by Rukh trainer Georgi Shvetsov. According to them, he had been very angry after Rukh's 8–0 defeat. Therefore, he informed the Gestapo that the former Dynamo players had been officially members of the NKVD. The Gestapo arrested them as potential NKVD agents who could organise sabotage acts in Kiev.

Ukrainian historians are convinced that this version was the real reason for the arrest; also because the three former Lokomotive players in FC Start were not prosecuted by the Gestapo. The Gestapo arrested neither Georgi Timofeyev, for having played in the "Death match", nor Lev Gundarev who was named on the poster but did not take part in the match. Both served in the Ukrainian police. Their names were never mentioned in Soviet publications.

=== The first two deaths ===
The Kiev archives document the cases of Olexander Tkachenko and Mikola Korotkykh as both not having played on Dynamo's first team before the war. Both cases do not show any context of the "Death Match":

- Tkachenko, one of the three policemen in FC Start, had beaten up a German in Kiev and therefore was arrested by the Gestapo. According to his mother's report, he tried to escape from the Gestapo arrest and was shot by an SS man. At this very moment, his mother came to the police station where he had been taken when arrested to bring him a meal. His case was not mentioned in Soviet publications.
- Korotkykh had left Dynamo in 1939 and played in the club Rotfront. In 1942, he did not work in the bakery but in the kitchen of a German officers' club. His name was on a list of former NKVD agents established by Ukrainian collaborators. When he got information about this list, he hid himself. According to some reports, his sister was afraid of the Gestapo and denounced him. During the interrogation, the Gestapo tortured Korotkykh to death. According to some of the players, the Germans found a NKVD identity card in his clothes, but there is no proof for this version in the NKVD archives, which contain only documents about his membership in the Communist Party and about his military service in a NKVD unit from 1932 to 1934 in the Russian city of Ivanovo.

=== Forced labour in the concentration camp Syrets ===
After three weeks in the Gestapo prison, eight of the former Dynamo players were deported to the Syrets concentration camp next to the valley of Babi Yar in the outskirts of Kiev. Nikolai Trusevich, Olexi Klimenko and Ivan Kuzmenko had to work in a group of street builders. Pavlo Komarov, Mikhail Putistin and Fedor Tyutchev worked as electricians outside the camp. Makar Honcharenko and Mikhailo Sviridovsky had to repair shoes for the Wehrmacht. The prisoners working outside the camp were not guarded by the SS, but rather by Ukrainian policemen who allowed their families to bring them food. They spent only nights in the camps; Komarov was chosen by the SS as a Kapo.

=== Execution of three players in the concentration camp ===
About half a year after their arrest, Trusevich, Klimenko and Kuzmenko were executed amongst a group of prisoners on 24 February 1943 in the camp. Survivors reported that the bodies were thrown into the mass graves of Babi Yar. None of the surviving players described the execution as a consequence of the match on 9 August 1942. On the occasion of the 50th anniversary of the match, Honcharenko said on Kiev radio: "They died like many other Soviet people because the two totalitarian systems were fighting each other and they were destined to become victims of that grand-scale massacre."

The reports give several reasons for the execution:

- A conflict concerning the dog of the camp commandant Paul Radomski: Some prisoners were said to have beaten it with a shovel in the camp kitchen. In this situation one of the prisoners had attacked an SS soldier.
- Punishment for the escape of some prisoners.
- Disobedience of prisoners who were ordered to hang other prisoners who tried to flee from the camp.
- A sabotage act of partisans on a tank repair facility.

After receiving the information about the execution in the camp, Honcharenko and Sviridovsky left the shoe repairing facility and hid in the apartment of friends in Kiev. Putistin and Tyutchev fled from the camp in September 1943 when the Germans left Kiev.

== Soviet period ==
=== Creation of myths ===
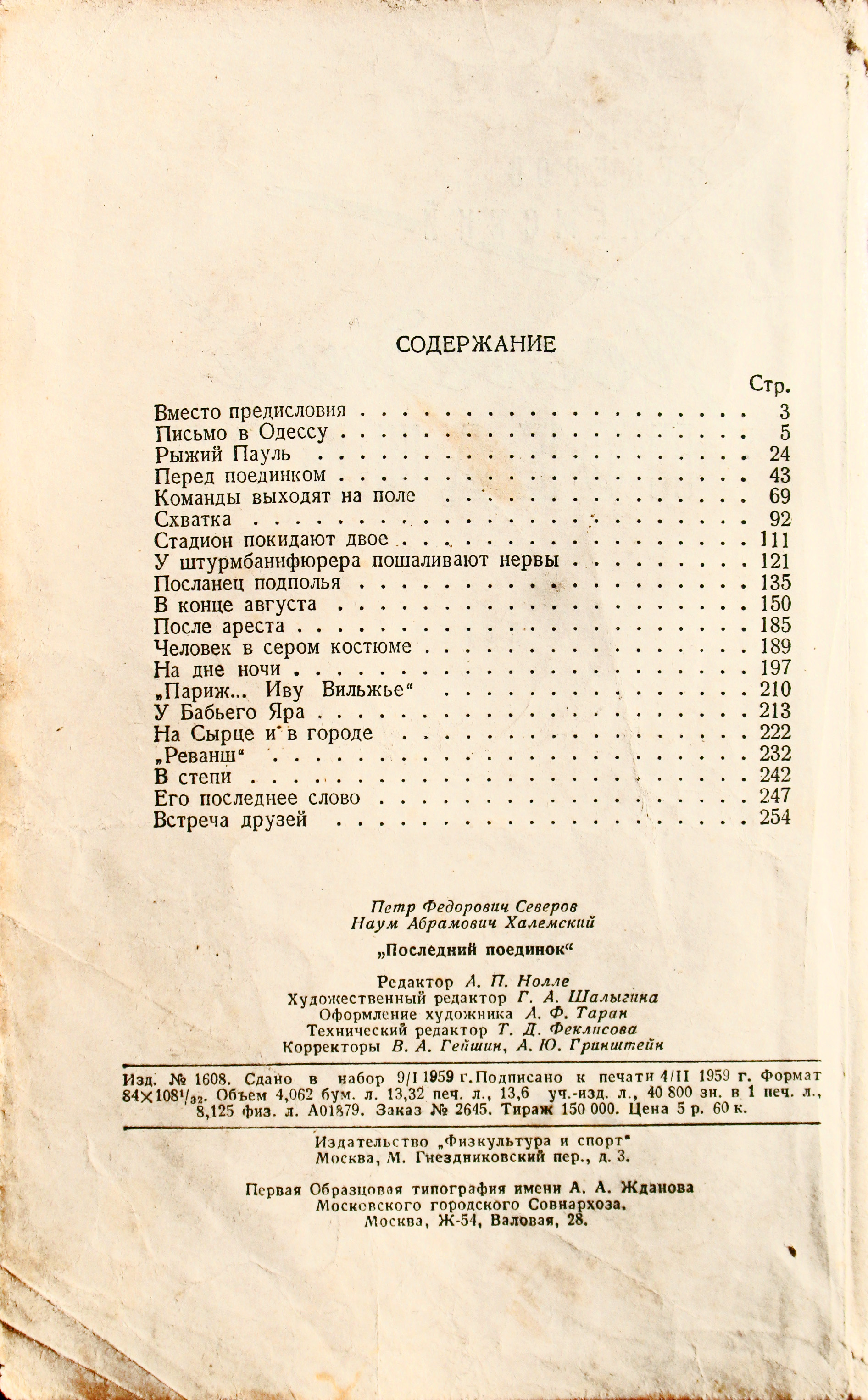
Contents of the Severov/Khalemsky novel The Last Duel (1959 reprint)

In autumn of 1943, after the withdrawal of the German troops from the city of Kiev and the re-establishment of Soviet administration, writer Lev Kassil was the first to report the death of Dynamo players, allegedly murdered by the Germans. But his report in the newspaper Izvestiya did not mention the football match. The expression "Death Match" first appeared after the war, in the newspaper Stalinskoye plemya ("Stalin's tribe") on August 24, 1946 (#164, page 3) where a film script of Aleksandr Borshchagovsky was published. In 1958, he published his novel Alerting Clouds (Trevozhnye oblaka) about the match. Also in 1958, Piotr Severov and Naum Khalemsky published their novel The Last Duel (Russian: Последний поединок, romanized: Posledni poyedinok).

These two novels provided the inspiration for Yevgeny Karelov's 1962 black-and-white film The Third Half (Тreti taym). According to the Great Soviet Encyclopedia, about 32 million spectators in total saw it in Soviet cinemas. The "Death Match" also became a very popular subject of the Soviet press. None of these publications mentioned survivors of the match.

=== After World War II (1945–1964) ===
The Start players who survived the Nazi occupation did not appear in public. In the years immediately following the end of World War II, they were initially suspected as having collaborated with the Nazis, and were interrogated and then kept under surveillance by the secret police (NKVD) for several years.

Komarov, Dynamo's penalty specialist before World War II, left Kiev with the Germans. It is not known whether he was forced to come with them as a forced labour slave or was a collaborator. In 1945, he found himself in occupied Western Germany and soon he emigrated to Canada. His name was never mentioned in any Soviet publications.

Former Ukrainian policeman Timofeyev was sentenced to five years in the Gulag for collaborating with the Germans. Gundarev, according to NKVD documents a "German agent", was condemned to death, but later his punishment was changed to ten years in the Gulag. He was not allowed to return to Kiev; he had to stay in the Asian part of the Soviet Union. He became the director of the stadium in Karaganda in the Soviet Republic of Kazakhstan. Both cases were never mentioned in Soviet publications.

=== In the Brezhnev era ===
The reports about the "Death Match" changed in the mid-1960s. During the presidency of Leonid Brezhnev, the propaganda of the Communist Party emphasised the heroism of the Soviet population during World War II. As a result, the "Death Match" became regarded as a part of Kiev's war history. The exact number of victims was given: four Dynamo players were supposedly murdered by the Germans – the goalkeeper Nikolai Trusevich, an ethnic Russian, defender Olexi Klimenko and striker Ivan Kuzmenko, who together had played on the vice champion team of 1936, as well as midfielder Mikola Korotkykh, who had left Dynamo in 1939.

In 1965, the Supreme Soviet of the USSR awarded posthumously the Medal "For Courage" to these four Dynamo players murdered by the Germans. Five surviving players received the Medal for Battle Merit: Volodymyr Balakin, Makar Honcharenko, Mikhailo Melnik, Vassyl Sukharev, Mikhailo Sviridovsky. Tyutchev died in 1959, before the surviving Dynamo players became stars of Soviet propaganda. Putistin was not awarded any honour in 1966. According to his son, he did not want to repeat the propaganda version. By the end of the 1960s, Honcharenko became a media figure and often told the official version of the Death Match, but after the end of the Soviet regime he denied this version.

Despite a KGB dossier expressing concern about the possible "glorification" of the surviving players with known collaborators amongst them, two monuments to their honour were erected in Kiev in 1971. The former Zenit Stadium, where the match had taken place in 1942, was renamed as the FC Start Stadium.

=== Investigation in Germany ===
After the publication of a report in a German newspaper repeating the Soviet version, a case about the "Death Match" was opened by the prosecution office of Hamburg in July 1974. As Soviet authorities did not collaborate on the case, it was closed in March 1976. In 2002, the Ukrainian authorities informed Hamburg about their new investigation, so the case was reopened, but finally closed by the investigation commission in February 2005. The commission was not able to find any connections between the game and the execution of people who participated in it, nor any person responsible for the executions being still alive. Radomski had been killed on 14 March 1945.

== In popular culture ==
The "Death Match" has inspired numerous films, books, and articles.

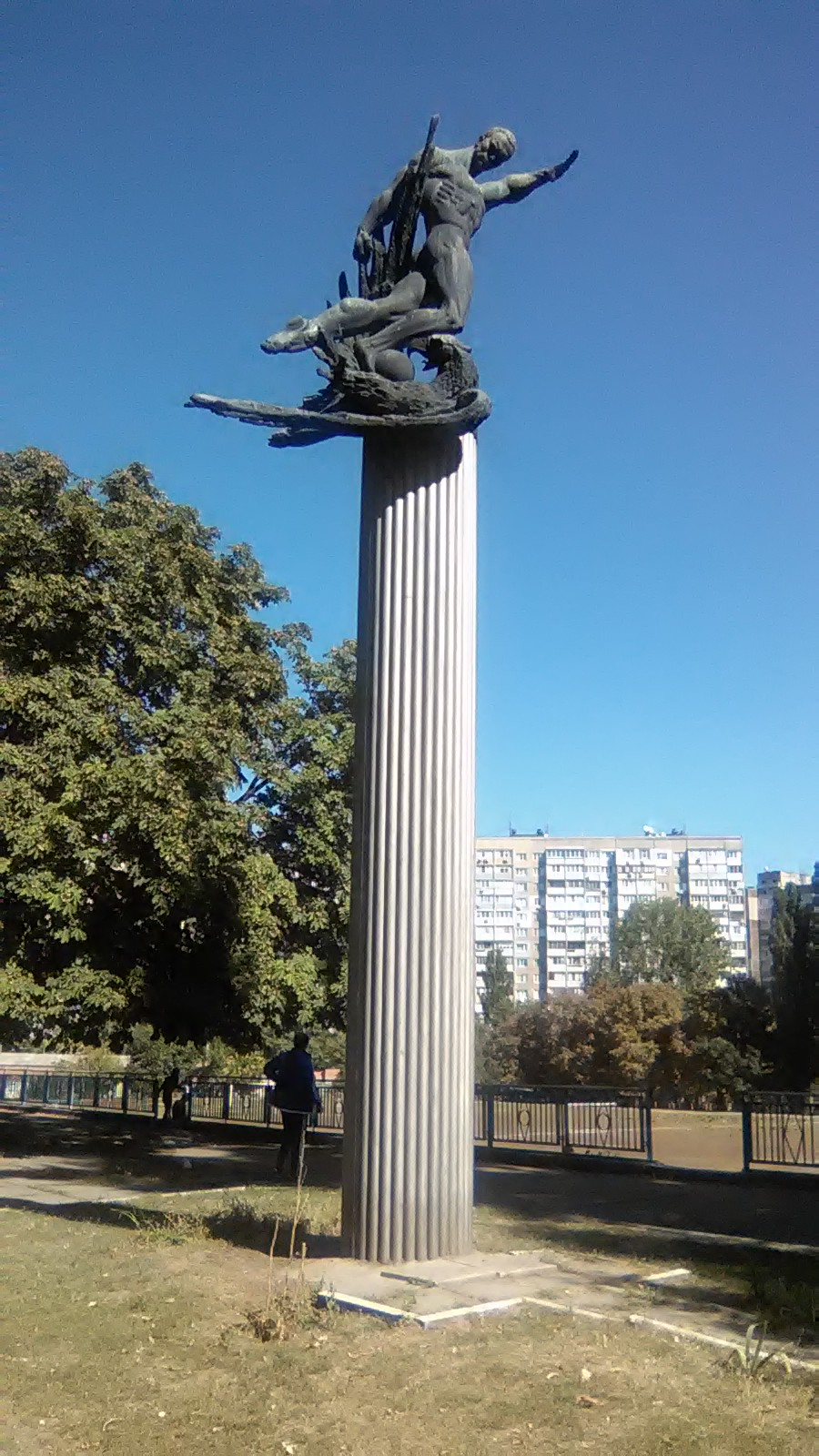
Memorial plaque in honor of Dynamo football players, participants in the "Death Match".

=== The Third Half (1962) ===
Soviet Russian director Yevgeny Karelov's 1962 black-and-white film The Third Half was inspired by two 1958 novels: Aleksandr Borshchagovsky's Alerting Clouds (Trevozhnye oblaka) and Piotr Severov and Naum Khalemsky's The Last Duel (Posledni poyedinok).

=== Two Half Times in Hell (1961) ===
Two Half Times in Hell was a 1961 Hungarian war film in which Germans would play against Hungarian prisoners of war.

=== The Longest Yard (1974) ===
The Longest Yard is a 1974 American sports comedy film directed by Robert Aldrich, written by Tracy Keenan Wynn and based on a story by producer Albert S. Ruddy. The film follows a former NFL player (Burt Reynolds) recruiting the group of prisoners and playing football against their guards. The film has been remade three times, including for the 2001 British film Mean Machine, starring Vinnie Jones, the 2005 film remake, The Longest Yard starring Adam Sandler, and as the 2015 Egyptian film Captain Masr.

=== Escape to Victory (1981) ===
In 1981, Michael Caine and Sylvester Stallone starred in the film Escape to Victory, directed by John Huston, which told the story of a group of Allied POWs who are challenged to a match against the prison's guards. While the film's POWs are not Ukrainian but rather predominately Westerners, the story parallels are clear: they are threatened with death if they win, the playing ground is surrounded with Nazi guards and attack dogs, the referee ignores vicious and brutal fouls committed by the German team, yet the Allied prisoner team ignore the threat and draw the match, thus risking forfeiting their lives. (Huston's film has a deus ex machina ending which conflicts with the original Soviet story when the spectators storm the field at the match's end and the POWs escape in the resultant confusion, but as no event similar to this actually occurred in the West during World War II, it is generally assumed that this film was inspired by the legendary/propaganda version of the Death Match.)

=== Dynamo: Defending the Honour of Kiev (2001) ===
In Anglo-American media, the publication of Dynamo: Defending the Honour of Kiev, written by the Scottish journalist Andy Dougan, inspired many articles.

Without giving any concrete sources Dougan's docufiction which invented dialogues repeats the Soviet version of an SS-officer threatening the Start players (p. 178). According to him the players were arrested because of their victories against Flakelf. He describes many details which Ukrainian historians revealed as false before the publication of his book: e.g. the red jerseys as symbol of the players‘ communist spirit (p. 137), the SS officer demanding the Nazi salutation from the Start players (p. 164), the heavy armed German soldiers surrounding the playground with German shepherds(p. 177-178), Trusevich praising the Soviet regime before his execution (p. 210).

=== The Death Match: Dynamo Kiev vs. the Nazis (2008) ===
In 2008, Willie Gannon, a senior writer for the Bleacher Report, wrote an article about the Dynamo's "Death Match" that starts with the following "This is a true story that I was told by my father..." Mr.Gannon claims that Germans entered Kiev "with little or no resistance" and Major General Ebenhardt was rushing to stage a game between a German team and no other else but Dynamo Kiev. In the article the writer also describes that the Kiev team was always threatened with execution, but played and won every single game including the game against "German" team Rukh. After beating Rukh 8 to 0, all players were either executed or sent to concentration camps, so no one survived.

=== Match (2012) ===
The film Match (2012) by the Russian director Andrey Malyukov, also ignores the reports of Ukrainian witnesses and scholars, and repeats the Soviet propaganda version. In the film, Russian communists are fighting against the German occupiers. All the collaborateurs speak Ukrainian. Malyukov became popular as a director of a nationalistic–patriotic TV series about Russian troops in the Caucasus and in Afghanistan. Ukrainian authorities blocked the release of the film for several months because according to them, the film gives a wrong picture of history.

== Other Soviet war myths ==
- Panfilov's Twenty-Eight Guardsmen

== Sources ==
- Bredenbrock, Claus (2008). "Die Todeself. Kiew 1942: Fußball in einer besetzten Stadt". In Lorenz Peiffer; Dietrich Schulze-Marmeling (eds.). Hakenkreuz und rundes Leder – Fußball im Nationalsozialismus. Göttingen: Verlag Die Werkstatt. ISBN 978-3-89533-598-3.
- Dougan, Andy (2001). Dynamo. Triumph and Tragedy in Nazi-occupied Kiev. Guildford. ISBN 1-58574-719-X.
- Hynda, Volodymyr (2012). Український спорт під нацистською свастикою (1941–1944 рр.) [Ukrainian sport under the Nazi swastika] (in Ukrainian). (Гінда, Володимир). Zhytomyr. pp. 243–336. ISBN 978-617-581-116-0. Archived from the original on 2016-03-04.
- Kulida, S. Debunk myths about the Death Match. "Svoboda" magazine. 10 May 2005
- Kuzmin, Georgi (Георгий КУЗЬМИН) (1995). ГОРЯЧЕЕ ЛЕТО СОРОК ВТОРОГО… [Hot summer of the forty second]. Dynamo Kyiv historical website of Sergei Pavlov (at www.junik.lv) ref:Futbol weekly (special edition) 13/1995. Archived from the original on 2016-10-01.
- Pristaiko, Volodymyr (2006). Чи був "матч смертi"? Документи свiдчать [Did the Death Match Happen? Documents Give Witness] (in Ukrainian). Пристайко, Володимир. Kyiv. ISBN 966-7769-56-9.
