= FC Start =

FC Start may refer to:

- A Soviet football team that featured in The Death Match
- FC Start Ulyanovsk, a Russian football team now known as FC Volga Ulyanovsk
- IK Start, a Norwegian football team
