= The Two Captains =

Novel by Veniamin Kaverin

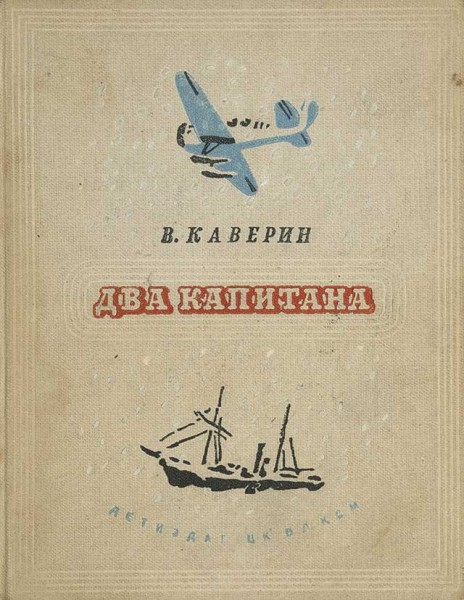
- Author: Veniamin Kaverin
- Original title: Два Капитана
- Language: Russian
- Publication place: U.S.S.R.

The Two Captains (Russian: Два Капитана) is a novel written by Soviet author Veniamin Kaverin between 1937 and 1946. It is Kaverin's best known work and is considered one of the most popular works of Soviet literature, winning the USSR State Prize in 1946 and being reissued 42 times in 25 years. The novel tells the story of a Russian youth, Alexander Grigoryev, as he grows up through Czarist Russia to the October Revolution to World War II. At the center of the story is Grigoriev's search for the lost Arctic expedition of Captain Ivan Tatarinov and the discovery of Severnaya Zemlya.

== History ==
The novel was written in 1937 and then reworked over a period of nine years.

== Plot summary ==
After a postman drowns, Sanya, 8, finds a bag full of letters. As the envelopes are all wet, there is no way to read the addresses and send the letters. A neighbour, Aunt Dasha, reads the letters to anyone willing to listen during the cold winter evenings. Thus Sanya first hears of the lost Arctic expedition that will become the meaning of his life. For now on he is only fascinated by the brave people and their adventures, though he already can understand that the expedition is probably lost and all its participants are dead. Meanwhile, tragedy comes into his own life. One night he goes fishing in the river and witnesses a murder. Next morning his own father is accused of it, the accusation based on the knife with the name of "Grigoryev" beside the victim. Sanya knows that it is he who has lost the knife, but he cannot tell anything because he is mute. Sanya's father is taken to prison and eventually dies there. During the hard and hungry winter of father's being in prison, mother sends Sanya and his sister, also Sanya (he is Alexander and she is Alexandra) to a village to live the two of them all alone. There Sanya meets the Doctor, a runaway revolutionary, who teaches the boy to speak. He disappears three days after his mysterious arrival, but Sanya keeps practicing all winter - only to start speaking when he is told of his father's death. Eventually mother comes for the children and takes them home, where they discover she is about to remarry. The stepfather turns out to be cruel and selfish, and he abuses the children heavily. Mother realizes that and soon dies, probably after committing suicide (this is not specified; it could be an accident after which she has no will to live, though suicide is also possible, as to parallel the fates of Sanya and Katya's parents). Sanya then agrees to his best friend Pyetka's urges and the two escape to search for a better life in Turkestan, which they see as a magical land of the East. They give each other a pledge taken from the poem Ulysses of Alfred, Lord Tennyson: "To strive, to seek, to find and not to yield". This pledge always helps Sanya go on. After months of wandering through the winter forests, through war-beaten Russia of the 1917 winter, they end up in the hunger-stricken Moscow. Reality smashes in their faces, they get separated and lose each other for many years. Sanya ends up in an orphanage.

In the orphanage he meets two new friends, Valka and Romashka, and also the strict school headmaster, Nikolay Antonich Tatarinov. By chance - or fate - Sanya meets on the street an old woman originating from Sanya's own town, Ensk, and her granddaughter, Katya, of Sanya'a age. He soon realizes that they are his headmaster's family. After breaking the Tatarinov's lactometer, getting into a fight with Katya over that, and Katya's taking the blame, they become best friends and Sanya frequents the Tatarinov house, helping the old woman with the household. He also gets to meet the old woman's daughter, Katya's mother, Maria Vasilyevna, a mysterious sad woman. But one day, just after Sanya's beloved teacher, Korabliov, proposes to Maria Vasilyevna and gets a refusal, he overhears the teachers' cruel plot to destroy Korabliov, because he has gained the students' love and respect and has become more popular than the headmaster, and Sanya tells him of the plot. Nikolay Antonich discovers of Sanya's intervention (as it is discovered years later - through Romashka) and banishes him out of the house.

Years later, in the last school year, Sanya meets Katya again and realizes that he is in love with her. But Romashka spies on him kiss Katya and tells Nikolay Antonich. Nikolay Antonich sends Katya back to Ensk, but Sanya goes after her, thus visiting home, the beloved Aunt Dasha and the abandoned little sister for the first time since his escape. He finds the old letters and is shocked: only now does he realize that the mysterious letters of his childhood deal with no other than Katya's lost father, the Captain Tatarinov, one of them is actually from him - the last letters ever to have arrived, the letters Katya's mother has never seen. His letter clearly indicates that it was him who first discovered Severnaya Zemlya. But there is more: in his letter Katya's father accuses Nikolay Antonich of destroying the expedition, of doing everything to make it fail and the people never to return. But that page is missing: Sanya remembers it by heart, and his proof is a nickname that Katya's mother used to call Katya's father - Sanya could not have guessed or invented that nickname. Maria Vasilyevna believes Sanya. However, by now she is married to Nikolay Antonich, because she till now believed, according to his own words, that he actually was the great benefactor of the expedition, accusing the Captain, his cousin, to always have been a good-for-nothing who never succeeded in anything he tried to do. She believes Sanya - and commits suicide. Katya turns away from Sanya, Nikolay Antonich having convinced her and all the others that Sanya only slanders him. Sanya then swears to find the expedition and prove that he is right.

Sanya finishes school and fulfills his first dream - he becomes an Arctic pilot. While working in the North he meets again with the doctor who taught him to speak and discovers that the doctor possesses the diaries of the expedition's navigator. Sanya reads the diaries, but they do not contain any proof of Sanya's being right. One day, during a mission, Sanya and the doctor make a forced landing in a northern village, where they find a hook from Santa Maria, Captain Tatarinov's ship. An old native tells Sanya a ten-year-old story about himself finding a boat with a dead man in it. This is a proof that someone from the expedition has reached mainland, and that the remnants should be searched for in this region. Sanya comes back to Moscow and meets Katya again. He also meets a man who has to do with the expedition's organization, and his story, and the papers he has, are the lost proof. Korabliov tells all this to Katya and she realizes that Sanya was right. Sanya organizes a search expedition and leaves to the North again, as his leave is over.

Later in the year Sanya and Katya meet in Leningrad to get married and also to meet Sanya's sister and her husband, Sanya's best friend Pyetka, and be with them at the birth of their first son. But the sister is very ill during the birth and soon dies of complications. The search expedition is cancelled, probably through the efforts of Nikolay Antonich, who refuses to acknowledge his guilt, saying he will only accept one witness - the captain himself. Instead, Sanya is sent to the battlefields of the Civil War in Spain. When he returns, Sanya and Katya plan on finally starting their life together, but by then it's 1941 and the Germans invade Russia. Katya remains in Leningrad and is soon trapped in the blockade. During that horrid time Sanya's old enemy, Romashka, who has always been Nikolay Antonich's ally and all his life tried to harm Sanya, finds Katya. He tells her of meeting with the wounded Sanya on a bombed echelon and his apparent attempt to save Sanya's life. But after she finds in his pocket Sanya's documents, she starts thinking that Romashka has killed Sanya. Already starved and ill, she faints and gets worse. A friend manages, after many efforts, to send her away from the seized Leningrad.

Sanya, meanwhile, is not dead. It is true that he met Romashka on a bombed echelon, but Romashka abandoned him and ran away by himself, leaving Sanya, badly wounded in his legs and unable to move, to die in a forest under fire. Sanya manages to crawl out of the forest and is tended back to health by two little boys, and then goes to a field hospital. Upon leaving the hospital he is told that he will never fly again. Sanya tries to locate Katya but cannot find her trace, and starts believing that she is dead. Meanwhile, he is called back to fight, this time on the Northern front. He overcomes his condemnation and starts to fly again, bombing German ships invading the Northern Sea. During one of these fights he is forced to make a landing and thus finds the remnants of the expedition, and the Captain's last letters, clearly stating that all the blame is on Nikolay Antonich. He also finds the Captain himself, frozen to death 29 years ago.

One day he goes to visit his friend the Doctor and surprisingly meets Katya, who has come to the North in search for him. Sanya organizes a lecture about Captain Tatarinov and his achievements, and Nikolay Antonich is banished. Captain Tatarinov is buried with all honors on a shore facing the land he has discovered, and all ships passing through can see the engraving: "To strive, to seek, to find and not to yield".

== Adaptations ==
The Two Captains was adapted for the screen twice, in 1955 and in 1976, the latter as a TV miniseries. It was also made into a musical, Nord-Ost.

=== The 1955 Adaptation ===
Color, duration 98 minutes, by Lenfilm.

- Directed by: Vladimir Vengerov
- Script: Veniamin Kaverin, Evgeniy Gabrilovich
- Starring: Alexander Mihailov, Olga Zabotkina, Anatoliy Adoskin, Evgeniy Lebedev, Tatyana Peltzer, Bruno Friendlich, Borya Belyaev, Lyuda Bezuglaya, Borya Arakelov

=== The 1976 Adaptation ===
By Gosteleradio SSSR, Mosfilm

- Realization: Yevgeny Karelov
- Script: Veniamin Kaverin, Vladimir Savin, Yevgeny Karelov
- Composer: Evgeniy Ptichkin
- Directed by: L. Averbach

The Parts:

- Part One: "The Old Letters"
- Part Two: "The Tatarinovs"
- Part Three: "Katya's Father"
- Part Four: "Navigator Klimov's Diaries"
- Part Five: "To Strive, To Seek".
- Part Six: "To Find And Not To Yield"

Starring:

- Young Sanya - Seryozha Kudryavcev
- Sanya - Boris Tokarev
- Young Katya - Lena Lobkina
- Katya - Elena Prudnikova
- Young Sasha - Ira Klimenko
- Sasha - Natalia Egorova
- Young Pyetka - Sasha Puzankov
- Pyetka - Uriy Kuzmenkov
- Sanya's Mother - Zinaida Kirienko
- Sanya's Stepfather - Mikhail Pugovkin
- Aunt Dasha - Lyubov Sokolova
- The Doctor - Vladimir Zamanskiy
- Young Romashov - Alyosha Senchev
- Romashov - Yuri Bogatyryov
- Nikolay Antonich - Nikolai Gritsenko
- Maria Vasilyevna - Irina Pechernikova
- Nina Kapitonovna - Vera Kuznecova
- Korablyov - Georgiy Kulikov
- Valka Zhukov - A. Vigdorov
- Von Vyshimirskiy - Alexander Vokach
