= The Third Half (1962 film) =

- Russian poster
- Russian: Третий тайм
- Directed by: Yevgeny Karelov
- Written by: Aleksandr Borshchagovskiy
- Starring: Leonid Kuravlyov; Vyacheslav Nevinnyy; Gleb Strizhenov; Yuri Volkov; Vladimir Kashpur
- Cinematography: Sergei Zajtsev
- Edited by: Klavdiya Aleyeva
- Music by: Andrei Petrov
- Production company: Mosfilm
- Release date: 1962
- Running time: 88 min.
- Country: Soviet Union
- Language: Russian

The Third Half (Russian: Третий тайм, romanized: Tretiy taym) is a 1962 Soviet sports war film directed by Yevgeny Karelov.

== Plot ==
The film is loosely based on the football match of 9 August 1942, later known as The Death Match, between a team of German soldiers and professional footballers of FC Start (including former players of FC Lokomotyv Kyiv and FC Dynamo Kyiv) in German-occupied Kiev. The plot of the film is based on the then-official Soviet version of the football match. The names and surnames of the characters and the names of the football teams in the film are invented, and the setting is not mentioned (an unnamed "city"). According to the plot of the film (screenwriter O. Borshchagovsky), the only match between the German and Soviet teams took place on 22 June 1942 (coinciding with the 1-year anniversary of Operation Barbarossa, rather than the historically correct date of 9 August 1942), which the "city team" won against the Nazis with a score of 4–3. In the film The Third Half, German athletes are shown as deliberate violators of football rules, who try to win by unfair play and outright intimidation of the opponent.

== Cast ==
- Leonid Kuravlyov as Leonid Fokin
- Vyacheslav Nevinny as Savchuk
- Gleb Strizhenov as Yevgeny Ryazantsev
- Yuri Volkov as Sokolovsky
- Vladimir Kashpur as Kirill Zaitsev
- Gennadi Yukhtin as Dugin
- Alexey Eybozhenko as Lemeshko
- Erwin Knausmüller as Major Heinz
- Georgy Svetlani as hairdresser
- Yuriy Nazarov as Misha Skachko
- Valentina Sharykina as Vera

== See also ==
- List of association football films
