= Children of Don Quixote =

- Directed by: Yevgeny Karelov
- Written by: Nina Fomina
- Produced by: Gleb Kuznetsov
- Starring: Anatoli Papanov; Vera Orlova; Vladimir Korenev; Lev Prygunov; Andrey Belyaninov
- Cinematography: Emil Gulidov
- Edited by: Vsevolod Massino
- Music by: Georgy Firtich
- Production company: Mosfilm
- Release date: 1966
- Running time: 78 minutes
- Country: Soviet Union
- Language: Russian

Children of Don Quixote (Russian: Дети Дон Кихота, romanized: Deti Don-Kikhota) is a 1966 Soviet comedy-drama film by Yevgeny Karelov.

== Plot ==
Story of an ordinary family at first glance. Large family physicians, three boys. The first a young painter (Victor — Vladimir Korenev), second (Dima — Lev Prygunov) is growing and looking for love, for a third (Yura — Belyaninov) life is a dark cinema hall with his friend, a classmate instead of school. Middle decides to marry, Jr. fled to Africa for the liberation of the oppressed blacks, senior decides that inept and seeking a way out of a creative crisis.

The father Pyotr Bondarenko (Anatoly Papanov) obstetrician in the hospital. His principle of life if you can do something for the people then do it without expecting reward, not hearing spiteful critics and scoffers. Only at the end of the film the viewer realizes that all his sons were adopted. They are children of former patients Bondarenko, who abandoned the child, and he was unable to convince them not to make this mistake, and therefore took responsibility for the fate of the children. At the final, doctor adopts a fourth boy for the same reason.

== Cast ==
- Anatoli Papanov as Pyotr Bondarenko, an obstetrician-gynecologist
- Vera Orlova as Vera Bondarenko, plastic surgeon
- Vladimir Korenev as Viktor Bondarenko, the eldest son, painter
- Lev Prygunov as Dima Bondarenko, the middle son, a college student
- Andrey Belyaninov as Yuri Bondarenko (some episodes voiced by Maria Vinogradova), the youngest son, a pupil
- Natalya Fateyeva as Marina Nikolaevna, director of the theater, Victor's secret love
- Nikolay Parfyonov as Athanasy Petrovich, chief accountant cinema
- Natalya Sedykh as Motya, freckled girl, the Dima's bride
- Natalya Zorina as Valya, a neighbor and Dima's classmate
- Valentina Berezutskaya as Maria Ivanovna, nurse
- Sasha Blagoveschensky as Andrey, Yuri Bondarenko friend
- Zoya Vasilkova as Zoya Nikolaevna, Valya's and Andrey's mother
- Maria Kremneva as nurse, fallen asleep on duty
- Valentina Ananina as puerpera
- German Kachin as Sazonov, the patient
- Irina Murzaeva as old woman with a dog
- Elvira Lutsenko as fat milf
- Galina Volchek as episode

== Release ==
Yevgeny Karelov's film was watched by 20.6 million Soviet viewers, which is the 891th result in the history of Soviet film distribution.
