= Smoke in the Forest (film) =

- Russian: Дым в лесу
- Directed by: Yuri Chulyukin; Yevgeny Karelov
- Written by: Arkady Gaidar
- Starring: Anatoli Berladin; Ludmila Genika-Chirkova; Ira Luzanova; Gennady Sayfulin; Yura Zhuchkov
- Cinematography: Igor Chernykh; Vladimir Minayev
- Music by: Grigori Frid
- Release date: 1955
- Country: Soviet Union

Smoke in the Forest (Russian: Дым в лесу) is a 1955 Soviet adventure film directed by Yuri Chulyukin and Yevgeny Karelov.

The film shows how saboteurs organize a fire in the forest and shoot down a Soviet military aircraft, endangering the life of the pilot. He meets a good-natured guy, lost in the woods who decides to help the pilot.

== Plot ==
Based on the eponymous story by Arkady Gaidar, the action of which is moved forward by two decades.

In a small border village, a daring group of enemy saboteurs is active. They have set the forest on fire and shot down a plane that was observing them. The fire threatens to spread to a large factory, and the local residents have gone to assist the firefighters.

Volodya Kurmakov, a neighbor's boy, persuaded Maria Sergeyevna, the wife of a missing pilot, to take him with her to the airfield. On the way back, during an emergency stop, Volodya went for a walk in the forest and got lost.

After wandering for a while, he came upon a clearing where he found a crashed plane. Nearby, there was a wounded pilot, who sent the boy to the border guards, explaining the area where the arsonists should be searched.

== Starring ==
- Anatoli Berladin
- Ludmila Genika-Chirkova as mother of Volodya (as L. Genika)
- Ira Luzanova as Fenya
- Gennady Sayfulin as Volodya Kurnakov
- Yura Zhuchkov
