= Paul Radomski =

SS functionary in Nazi Germany

Paul Radomski in the uniform of an Untersturmführer of the Allgemeine SS

Paul Otto von Radomski (21 September 1902 – 14 March 1945) was an SS functionary of Nazi Germany. During World War II, he commanded the Syrets concentration camp in the occupied Ukraine, and the Haidari concentration camp, near Athens, in occupied Greece.

== SS career ==
Radomski was an Old Fighter of the Nazi Party, and one of the early companions of the eventual RSHA chief Reinhard Heydrich. Radomski served six months in prison in 1932 for the killing of a left-wing opponent. He was considered brutal, even by his fellow SS officers. At his subsequent trial in Greece, the SS judge, Sturmbannführer Wehser called him a drunkard "primitive in all his thoughts and feelings".

=== Syrets concentration camp ===
After serving in Stettin, Radomski was appointed commander of the Syrets concentration camp in Kiev. It was situated at the north-western edge of the city, in the place called Syrets, today a suburb of the city. The Syrets concentration camp was created in the spring of 1942. As commander of the Syrets concentration camp he led a terror regime, ordering severe punishments for the smallest infractions, a habit he carried over to his new posting in Greece. His crimes included lethal beatings, using a German shepherd to attack inmates and shooting inmates who were crushed by trees that they were forced to fell and climb.

=== Haidari concentration camp ===
In the autumn of 1943, Radomski was appointed commandant of Haidari concentration camp, near Athens, Greece. The previous German commandant, Sergeant Rudi Trepte, and his two Greek interpreters had been arrested by the Gestapo, for unknown reasons.

Under Radomski, the camp inmates were put to labour in two four-hour shifts each day except Sundays. The inmates were divided into groups of 100 men, with a hecatontarch in charge of each. However, the labour was not intended for any productive purposes, but merely to break the prisoners' morale: they were made to dig holes and then refill them, build walls and then break them down.

An account by an eyewitness, Constantine Vatikiotis, who was arrested on 26 October 1943, describes Radomski personally executing a Jewish prisoner called Levy, in front of the other prisoners, "for attempting to escape on the day of his arrest". This execution was to serve not only as a warning to the others, but, according to post-war psychological research, to "put the inmates in constant fear of their lives". Vatikiotis estimated that in the few months he was at Haidari some 2,000 people were executed. Another 300 died as a result of torture either at Haidari or in the Gestapo headquarters at Merlin street in central Athens. These numbers included 30 women, 104 invalids, and 230 students.

On 17 February 1944, after a drunken birthday party, Radomski threatened to shoot his own adjutant for losing his room keys. As a result of this action he was brought before an SS tribunal, demoted, and sentenced to six months in prison. Radomski was later sent to serve in Riga, Generalbezirk Lettland. He was replaced at Haidari by Lieutenant Karl Fischer.

After the war, track of Radomski was lost until 2005, when the Hamburg prosecutor announced that the Ukrainian authorities, investigating crimes in the Syrets concentration camp, had reported that Radomski had died on 14 March 1945 in the vicinity of Székesfehérvár in Hungary.
