= Federal Customs Service of Russia =

Authority agency of Russian, customs services

Federal Customs Service of Russia Федеральная таможенная служба
- Emblem of the Federal Customs Service

- Flag of the Federal Customs Service, 1994

Agency overview
- Formed: 1994
- Preceding agency: USSR Customs Committee

Jurisdictional structure
- Federal agency: RUS
- Operations jurisdiction: RUS
- Governing body: Government of Russia
- General nature: Federal law enforcement; Civilian police

Operational structure
- Headquarters: Novozavodskaya Ul. 11/5, Moscow, Russia
- Elected officer responsible: Dmitry Medvedev, Prime Minister of Russia
- Agency executive: Valery Pikalyov, Director
- Parent agency: Ministry of Finance

Website
- customs.gov.ru

The Federal Customs Service of Russia (Russian: Федеральная таможенная служба Российской Федерации, Federalnaya tamozhennaya sluzhba Rossiskoy Federatsii; abbreviated ФТС России, FTS Rossii) is a Russian government service regulating customs. It is part of Russia's Ministry of Finance. The Russian Customs Academy is subordinated to the service.

== History ==
The Customs Services in Russia were formed in 1865, as The Customs Department of the Ministry of Finance.

In 1917 the Soviet Customs Service was operated as The Main Directorate for Customs Control as part of the MKTP - The People's Commissariat for Trade and Industry.

In 1991, The Soviet Customs was replaced with The State Customs Committee (GTK) under the Ministry for Economic Development and in 2006 the GTK was renamed to current name.

On January 15, 2016, a presidential ukase placed the Federal Customs Service under the control of the Ministry of Finance.

== Heads of Customs of Russia ==
=== State Customs Committee ===
- Mikhail Vanin (1999 - 2004)

=== Federal Customs Service ===
- Aleksander Zherikhov (2004 - 2006)
- Andrey Belyaninov (2006 - 2016)
- Vladimir Bulavin (2016 - 2023)
- Ruslan Davydov (acting, 2023 - 2024)
- Valery Pikalyov (since 2024)

=== Rank insignia ===
	Junior Staff	
Rank	Praporshik	Senior Praporshik

	Middle Staff				Senior Staff		
Rank	Junior Lieutenant	Lieutenant	Senior Lieutenant	Captain	Major	Lieutenant Colonel	Colonel

	Higher Staff			
Rank	Major General	Lieutenant General	Colonel General	Actual State Councillor of the Customs Service of the Russian Federation

== See also ==
- Awards of the Federal Customs Service of Russia
- Federal crime
- Federal Security Service of the Russian Federation
- Main Directorate for Migration Affairs of the Ministry of Internal Affairs
