= Valery Pikalyov =

Russian politician

- Валерий Пикалёв
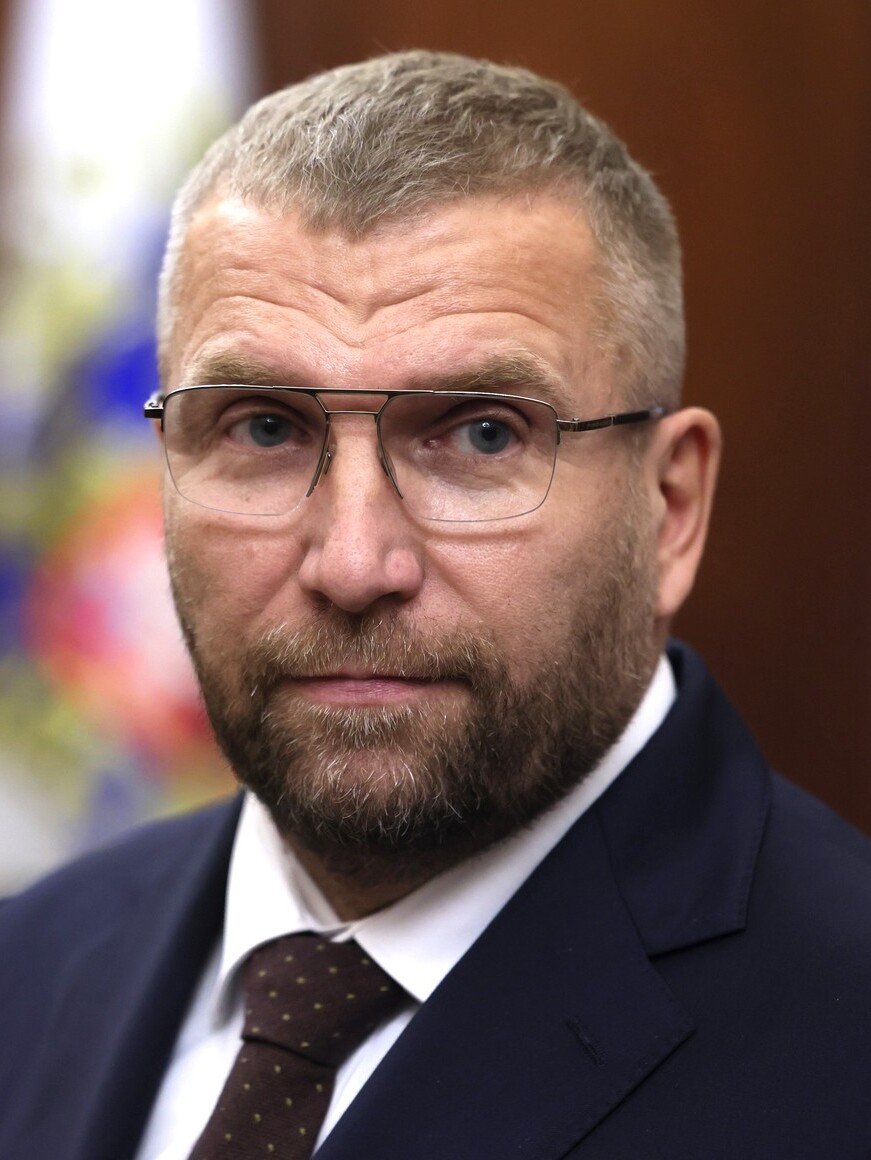
- Pikalyov in 2024

Head of the Federal Customs Service of Russia
- In office 14 May 2024 – Incumbent
- President: Vladimir Putin
- Prime Minister: Mikhail Mishustin
- Preceded by: Ruslan Davydov (acting)

Vice Governor of Saint Petersburg
- In office 27 November 2019 – 14 May 2024

Personal details
- Born: 2 September 1968 (age 58) Vypolzovo, Tver Oblast, Soviet Union
- Party: Independent
- Education: MVD Saint Petersburg University
- Awards: Order of Alexander Nevsky

Military service
- Allegiance: Russia

Valery Ivanovich Pikalyov (Russian: Валерий Иванович Пикалёв; born September 2, 1968, Vypolzovo, Tver Oblast) is a Russian politician who is serving as head of the Federal Customs Service of Russia since May 14, 2024. From 2019 to 2024 he served as Vice-Governor and Head of the Administration of the Governor of Saint Petersburg.

== Biography ==
Pikalyov was born on September 2, 1968 in the village of Vypolzovo, Bologovsky District, Tver Oblast, RSFSR.

From 1986 to 2018, he served in the Soviet Armed Forces and following the dissolution of the Soviet Union, the Russian Armed Forces.

In 2002, he graduated from the Saint Petersburg University of the Ministry of Internal Affairs of Russia.

After graduating, he began working in the government of the Leningrad Oblast as Deputy Chairman for Security. He was Deputy Chairman of the Government of the Novgorod Oblast for Housing and Public Utilities, Fuel and Energy Complex and Construction.

Valery Pikalyov worked in the Presidential Security Service of the President of Russia, responsible for the security of his residence in Novgorod Oblast.

At a meeting of the Legislative Assembly of Saint Petersburg on November 27, 2019, Valery Pikalyov was appointed to the post of Vice Governor and head of the Administration of the Governor of Saint Petersburg.

On May 14, 2024, Prime Minister Mikhail Mishustin signed a governmental resolution appointing Valery Pikalyov as the head of the Federal Customs Service of Russia.
