= Lela Karagianni =

Greek resistance leader during World War II (1898–1944)

- Λέλα Καραγιάννη
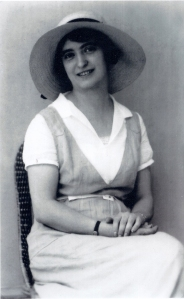
- Karagianni in 1916
- Born: Eleni Karagianni; 24 June 1898; Limni, Euboea, Greece
- Died: 8 September 1944 (aged 45–46); Athens, Greece
- Cause of death: Execution by firing squad
- Occupation: Resistance leader
- Children: 7
- Relatives: Laskarina Bouboulina (Great Grandmother)

Eleni "Lela" Karagianni (Greek: Λέλα Καραγιάννη [ˈlela karaˈʝani]; 1898 – 8 September 1944), also written Karayanni, was a Greek resistance leader during World War II who worked to coordinate Greek resistance cells and their activities against the occupying Axis forces. Captured and tortured by the Germans in 1944, Karagianni was sent to Haidari concentration camp, where she continued to organize a resistance against the Germans. She was executed by firing squad on 8 September 1944.

== Biography ==
Lela Karagianni was born in Limni, Euboea. Prior to World War II, Karagianni was a housewife in Athens. Her husband was a pharmacist, and the couple together had seven children. When the Axis powers invaded and occupied Greece in 1941, the Karagiannis provided medicine to retreating British soldiers, and later helped some stranded soldiers escape the country. As the occupation continued, the family grew increasingly involved in the burgeoning resistance movement against the-then Italian occupiers of Athens; this eventually resulted in the Lela, her husband, and her older sons joining the National Republican Greek League, commonly known by its Greek acronym EDES. Lela formed her own cell within the wider movement, code-named "Bouboulina" in reference to her great grandmother Laskarina Bouboulina, a female Greek captain who had fought against the Ottoman Empire during the Greek War of Independence.

Karagianni and her fellow partisans operated out of her husband's pharmacy in Athens and from a monastery in Megara. The cell distributed information to other cells, smuggled wanted individuals into areas controlled by Greek partisan forces, and forged documents, and coordinated with British military intelligence to disrupt the Axis occupation.

In July 1944, Karagianni was arrested in Athens by the German occupation forces. She was taken to the SS headquarters on Merlin Street, known to some Greek prisoners as "Hell House". There, she was tortured for several days before being sent to Haidari concentration camp on the outskirts of Athens. While interned, Lela continued to coordinate a resistance effort against the Germans. However, she and other captured resistance members were executed by firing squad on the morning of 8 September 1944, just 34 days before Athens was liberated by Allied forces.

== Legacy ==
Following the war, Lela Karagianni and her family (her husband, daughters, and sons survived the war) were honored for their efforts during the conflict. A bust of Karagianni was commissioned by the Union of Greek Women Scientists in 1963. In 2011 she was recognized as being Righteous Among Nations.

Her name has been given to a street in central Athens (Lelas Karagianni St., formerly Limnou St.), close to her house, now a property of the Municipality of Athens.

== Gallery ==
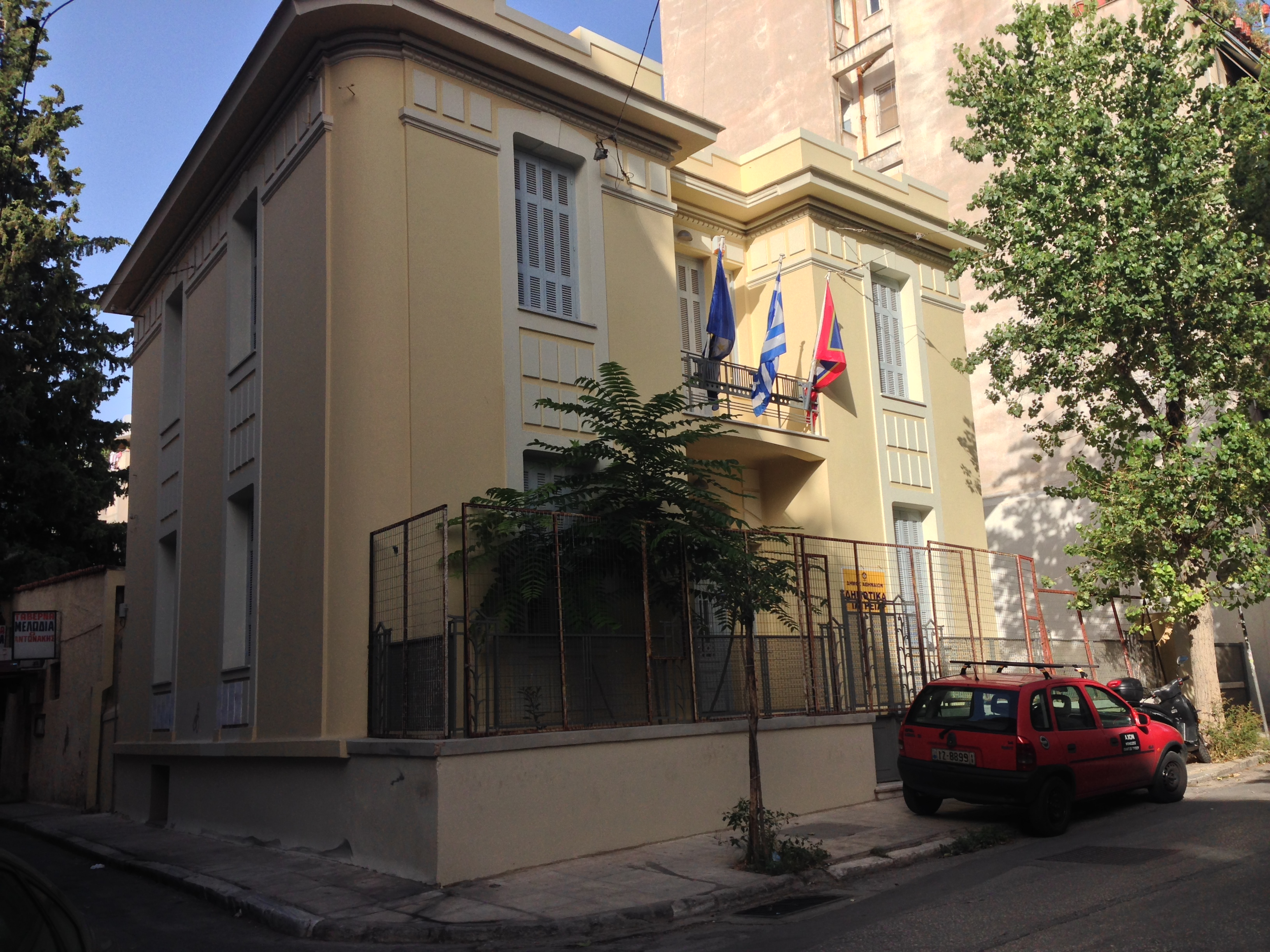
Karagianni's House in Athens

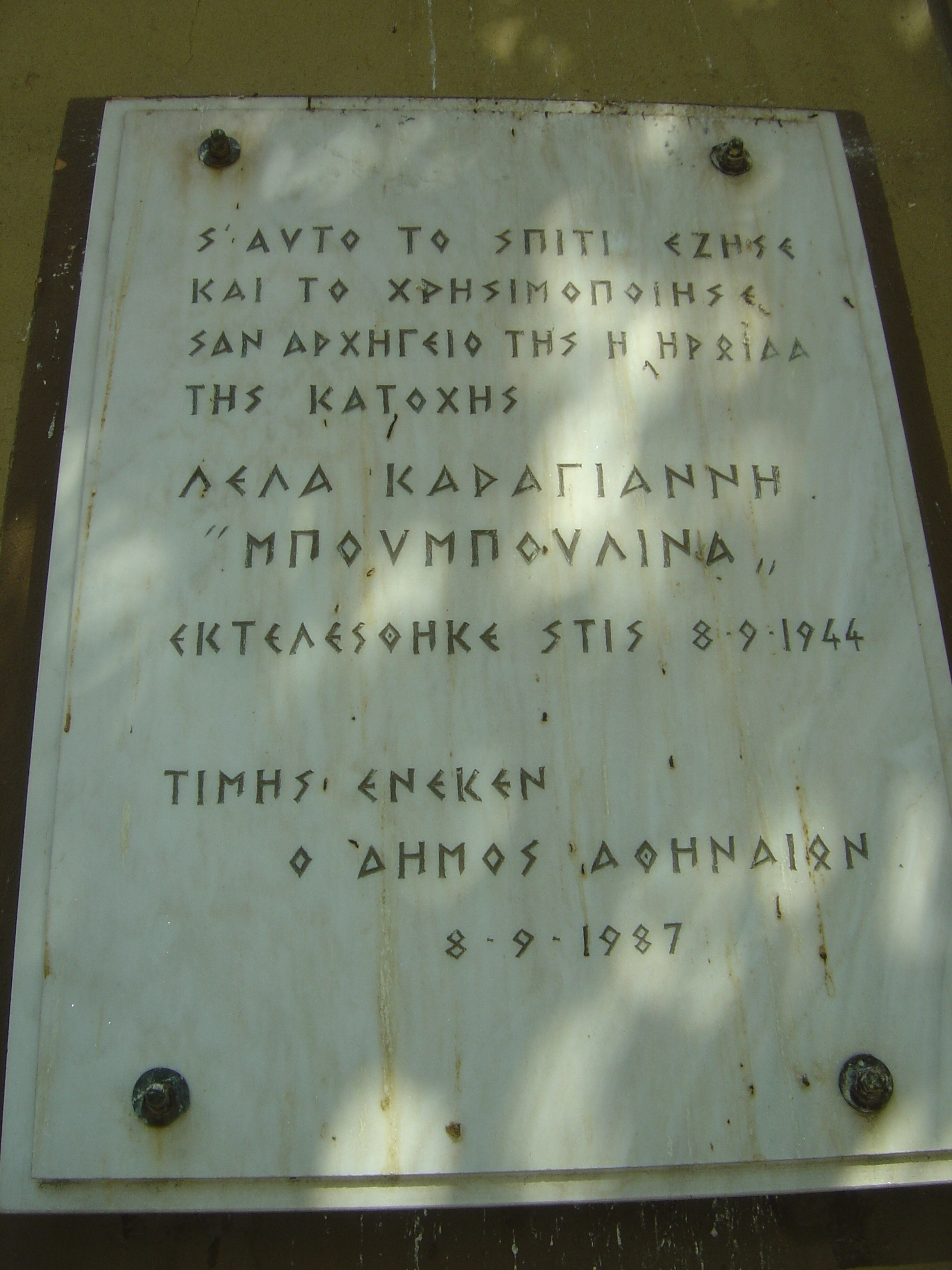
Memorial plaque in front of Kargianni's house

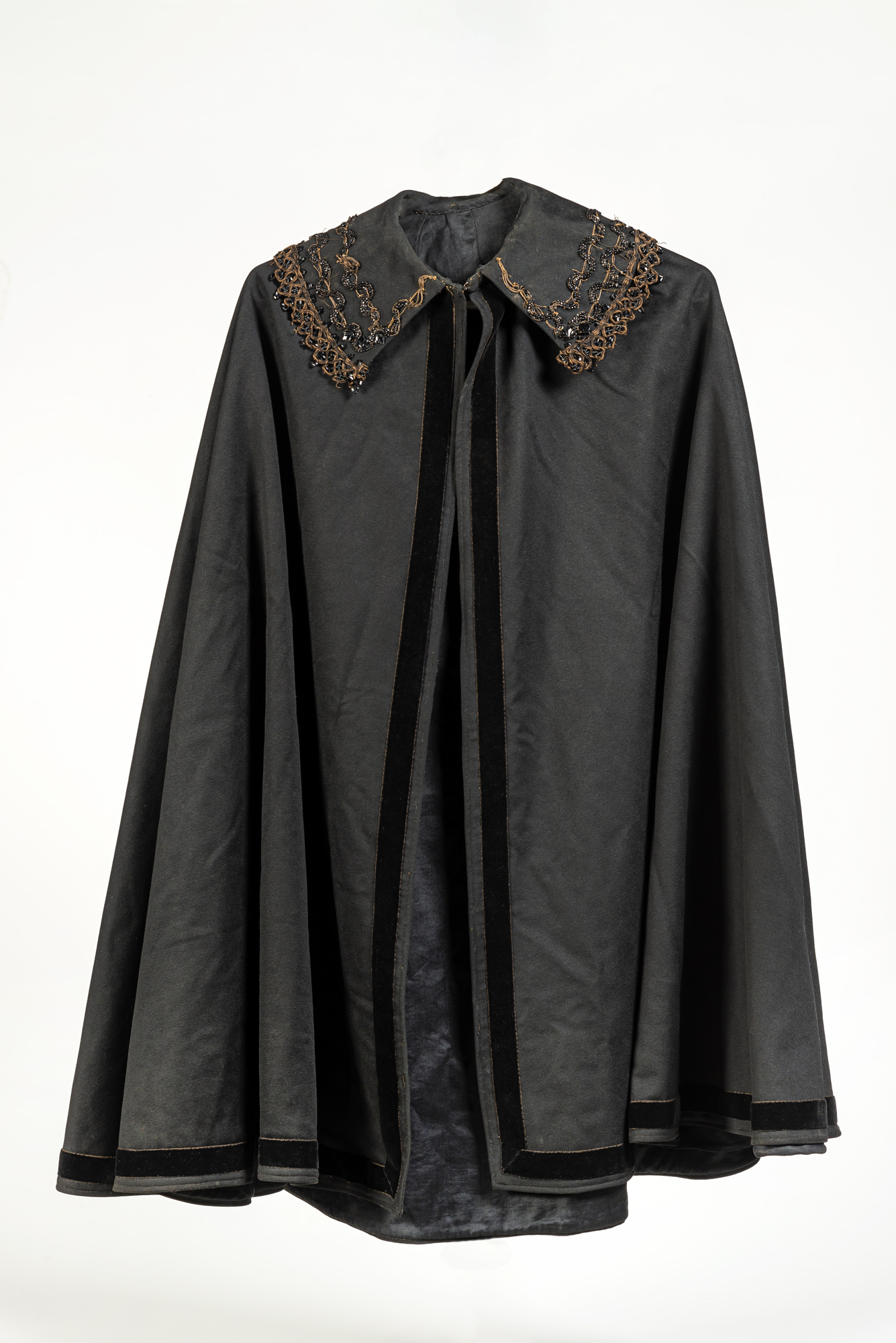
Karagianni's personal cape, held in Athens War Museum

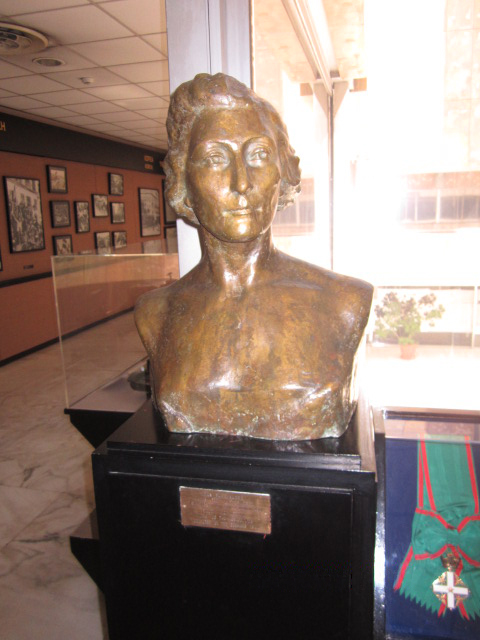
Bust of Lela Karagianni in Athens War Museum
