= Andrey Belyaninov =

Russian businessman and government official

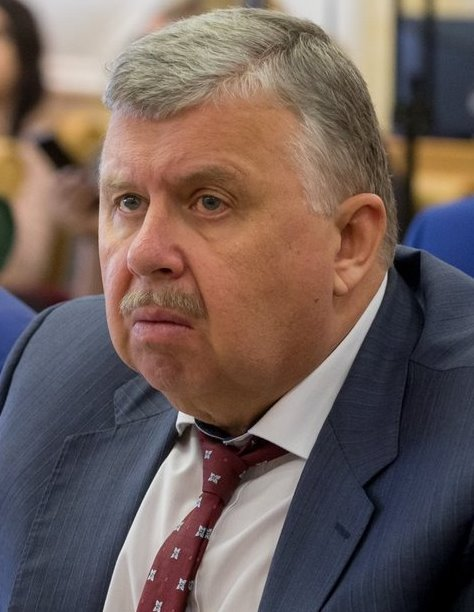
- Belyaninov in 2018

Chairman of the Eurasian Development Bank
- Incumbent
- Assumed office 1 December 2017

Head of the Federal Customs Service of Russia
- In office 12 May 2006 – 28 July 2016
- Preceded by: Alexander Zherikhov
- Succeeded by: Vladimir Bulavin

Personal details
- Born: 14 July 1957 (age 69) Moscow, Soviet Union (now Russia)
- Education: Plekhanov Russian University of Economics

Andrey Yuryevich Belyaninov (in Russian: Андрей Юрьевич Бельянинов, born July 14, 1957) is a Russian businessman and government official. He is a Chairman of the Eurasian Development Bank since 2017. Belyaninov graduated from Moscow Plekhanov Academy of National Economy and holds a Doctorate in Economics.

== Biography ==
As a child, he starred in Eugene Karelov "Children of Don Quixote"

Belyaninov graduated from the Moscow Plekhanov Academy of National Economy in 1978.

After graduation he worked in the First Main Directorate of the KGB in East Germany. He was also a financial expert at the REA bank and chairman of Novikombank.

== Career ==
- 1978-1991 he worked for the KGB.
- 1992-1999 he worked as a banker in several Russian banks.
- 1999-2000 he was the Deputy Economy General Director of Federal State Unitary Enterprise Promexport.
- 2000-2004 he was the Director General of Rosoboronexport.
- 2004-2006 he was the Director of the Federal Service for Defence Contracts.
- 2006-2016 he was the Head of the Federal Customs Service of Russia.

== Awards ==
- Order of Friendship
- Certificate of Merit from the Government of the Russian Federation (November 2, 2009) - for achievements in implementing the state customs policy and years of hard work

Preceded by Alexander Zherikhov	Head of the Federal Customs Service of Russia; May 12, 2006 – Jul 28, 2016	Succeeded by
