= Syrets concentration camp =

Nazi concentration camp (established 1942)

Coordinates: 50°28′17″N 30°26′58″E

Kiev-West
- Concentration camp
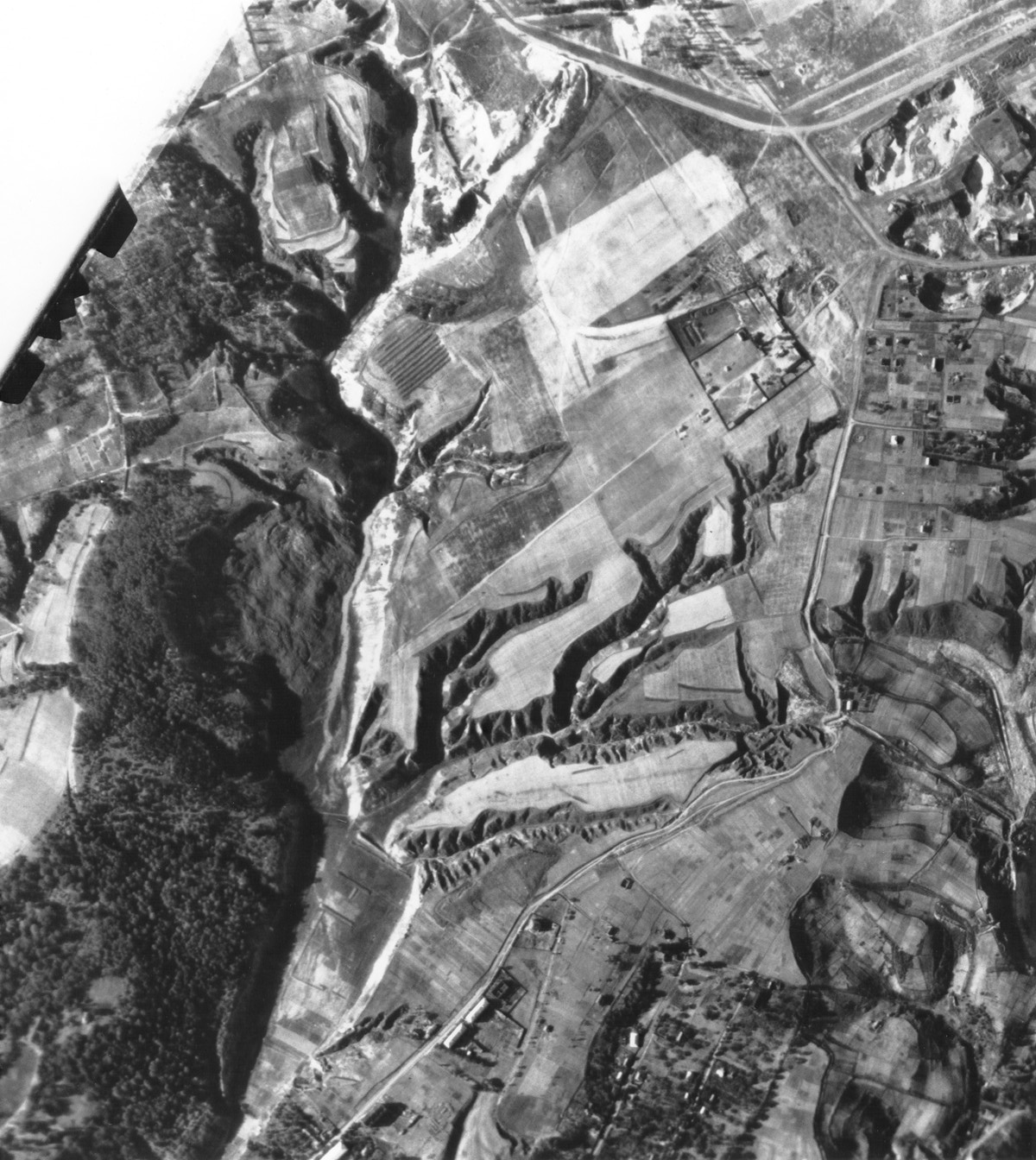
- Luftwaffe aerial photograph of Babi Yar, taken 26 September 1943 (shortly after the destruction of graves was complete).
- Other names: Syrez, Syrezky, or Syretskij
- Known for: A Sonderaktion 1005 action to remove evidence of the Babi Yar massacres
- Location: Babi Yar, a ravine near Kyiv, Ukraine (nowadays inside the city)
- Operated by: Einsatzgruppen, Ordnungspolizei, Ukrainian Auxiliary Police
- Commandant: Erich Ehrlinger, Paul Radomski, Paul Blobel, and others
- Number of inmates: 327, including 100 Jews

The Kiev-West (in German sources) or Syrets (Ukrainian: Сирець) was a Nazi concentration camp (or arbeitserziehungslager – correctional labour camp) established in 1942 in Kyiv's western neighborhood of Syrets, part of Kyiv since 1799. The toponym was derived from a local small river. Some 327 inmates of the KZ Syrets (among them 100 Jews) were forced to remove all traces of mass murder at Babi Yar.

== Establishment and location ==
The concentration camp was established in 1942 at the former summer camp of the Kyiv garrison on the northern edge of the city of Kyiv, a few hundred meters from the Babi Yar ravine, which had been the scene of enormous massacres in late September 1941 and later. Syrets was intended to be a subsidiary of Sachsenhausen concentration camp in Germany. About 3,000 people were imprisoned at Syrets, guarded by Ukrainian policemen and German SS. Paul Otto Radomski was the camp commandant.

The camp was built in June 1942 at the request of Hans Schumacher, a Nazi police official and head of the Gestapo in Kyiv (see Auschwitz Trial), which he made to his superior Erich Ehrlinger. The camp was intended to house prisoners perceived as opponents of the Nazi regime, mainly Jews. Once a person was arrested, only skilled craftsmen would survive, to be used as forced labor. All others were shot or murdered by gas van.

== Camp operation ==
The prisoners (women and men) were housed in wooden barracks and in dug-outs with doors and stairs leading down from the ground level to prevent them from freezing up in winter. The inmates were underfed and many starved to death, with daily mortality of around 10–15 people. Sturmbannführer Paul Radomski ran a terror regime in the camp with the aid of Kommandant Anton Prokupek and a company of Sotniks. For the smallest misdemeanours, he imposed heavy punishments and often struck the prisoners with the whip. Radomski also used his German shepherd pet, Rex, to attack inmates.

The sadism of the camp administration convinced many inmates to flee, despite the penalty of death. Guards were not immune, with some arrested or subject to solitary confinement if they helped.

== Inmate revolt ==
During exhumations carried out by the Sonderkommando 1005 operation, a group of prisoners secretly armed themselves with tools and scraps of metal they managed to find and conceal. They picked locks with keys that had been found on the bodies of victims. Martin Gilbert quotes historian Reuben Ainsztein:

... in those half-naked men who reeked of putrefying flesh, whose bodies were eaten by scabies and covered with a layer of mud and soot, and of whose physical strength so little remained, there survived a spirit that defied everything that the Nazis' New Order had done or could do to them. In the men whom the SS men saw only as walking corpses, there matured a determination that at least one of them must survive to tell the world about what happened in Babi Yar.

On the night of September 29, 1943, as the camp was being dismantled, an inmate revolt broke out. Prisoners overpowered the guards, using their bare hands, hammers, and screwdrivers. Fifteen people managed to escape. Among them was Vladimir Davіdov, who later served as a witness at the Nuremberg Trials. Among other escapees were Fyodor Zavertanny, Jacob Kaper, Filip Vilkis, Leonid Kharash, I. Brodskiy, Leonid Kadomskiy, David Budnik, Fyodor Yershov, Jakov Steiuk, Semyon Berland, Vladimir Kotlyar. Once Nazi control was re-established in the camp, the remaining 311 inmates were executed.

After the camp's liberation, Soviet authorities took a group of American, British, and Soviet correspondents to the site of the Babi Yar massacres. Bill Downs and Bill Lawrence were among those who interviewed three Syrets-held Jewish prisoners of war who had been forced to participate in the mass disposal of bodies: Efim Vilkis, Leonid Ostrovsky, and Vladimir Davidoff. In an article for Newsweek in December 1943, Downs described Vilkis' account of the prisoner escape:

However, even more incredible was the actions taken by the Nazis between August 19 and September 28 last. Vilkis said that in the middle of August the SS mobilized a party of 100 Russian war prisoners, who were taken to the ravines. On Aug. 19 these men were ordered to disinter all the bodies in the ravine. The Germans meanwhile took a party to a nearby Jewish cemetery whence marble headstones were brought to Babii Yar [sic] to form the foundation of a huge funeral pyre. Atop the stones were piled a layer of wood and then a layer of bodies, and so on until the pyre was as high as a two-story house. Vilkis said that approximately 1,500 bodies were burned in each operation of the furnace and each funeral pyre took two nights and one day to burn completely. The cremation went on for 40 days, and then the prisoners, who by this time included 341 men, were ordered to build another furnace. Since this was the last furnace and there were no more bodies, the prisoners decided it was for them. They made a break but only a dozen out of more than 200 survived the bullets of the Nazi Tommy guns.

According to Vilkis, some of the prisoners grew ill or went mad from the experience, and Nazi guards killed them as a warning to the rest. Three to five prisoners were shot each day.

== Camp for German POWs ==
When the Red Army liberated Kyiv on November 6, 1943, the camp was converted into an internment camp for German POWs and operated until 1946. The camp was subsequently demolished and in the 1950s and 1960s urban development began in the area, which included an apartment complex and a park. The construction of a dam nearby also saw the ravine filled with industrial pulp. The dam collapsed in 1961, leading to a mudslide with numerous fatalities.

== See also ==
- List of Nazi concentration camps
- The Holocaust
