= 1949 in Soviet football =

Football in the Soviet Union
- Season: 1949

Men's football
- 1st Group: Dinamo Moscow
- 2nd Group: Spartak Tbilisi
- Soviet Cup: Torpedo Moscow

The 1949 Soviet football championship was the 17th seasons of competitive football in the Soviet Union and the 11th among teams of sports societies and factories. Dynamo Moscow won the championship becoming the Soviet domestic champions for the fifth time and ending the three-year run for the Army team.

== Honours ==
Competition	Winner	Runner-up
1st Group	Dinamo Moscow (5*)	CDKA Moscow
2nd Group	Spartak Tbilisi	Zenit Kaliningrad
Soviet Cup	Torpedo Moscow (1)	Dinamo Moscow

Notes = Number in parentheses is the times that club has won that honour. * indicates new record for competition

== Soviet Union football championship ==
=== First Group ===
Pos	Republic	Team	Pld	W	D	L	GF	GA	GD	Pts
1	Russian SFSR	Dynamo Moscow	34	26	5	3	104	30	+74	57
2	Russian SFSR	CDKA Moscow	34	22	7	5	86	30	+56	51
3	Russian SFSR	Spartak Moscow	34	21	7	6	93	43	+50	49
4	Russian SFSR	Torpedo Moscow	34	16	10	8	64	42	+22	42
5	Russian SFSR	Zenit Leningrad	34	17	8	9	48	48	0	42
6	Georgian SSR	Dynamo Tbilisi	34	15	10	9	62	45	+17	40
7	Ukrainian SSR	Dynamo Kiev	34	17	6	11	48	47	+1	40
8	Russian SFSR	VVS Moscow	34	13	9	12	48	42	+6	35
9	Russian SFSR	Dynamo Leningrad	34	12	10	12	53	53	0	34
10	Russian SFSR	Krylia Sovetov Kuybyshev	34	10	12	12	40	61	−21	32
11	Russian SFSR	Lokomotiv Moscow	34	11	8	15	59	56	+3	30
12	Ukrainian SSR	Lokomotiv Kharkov	34	10	10	14	41	51	−10	30
13	Russian SFSR	Torpedo Stalingrad	34	8	10	16	36	52	−16	26
14	Azerbaijan SSR	Neftyanik Baku	34	6	12	16	26	42	−16	24
15	Byelorussian SSR	Dinamo Minsk	34	8	6	20	36	73	−37	22
16	Armenian SSR	Dynamo Yerevan	34	8	5	21	36	70	−34	21
17	Latvian SSR	Daugava Riga	34	7	5	22	21	64	−43	19
18	Ukrainian SSR	Shakhtyor Stalino	34	5	8	21	21	73	−52	18

Source: rsssf.com

=== Second Group ===
==== Subgroup Center (union republics) ====
Pos	REP	Team	Pld	W	D	L	GF	GA	GD	Pts	Qualification or relegation
1	GEO	Spartak Tbilisi	26	22	3	1	60	18	+42	47	Qualified for the Final stage
2	GEO	Dinamo Kutaisi	26	16	8	2	58	25	+33	40	Relegated to republican level
3	LTU	Spartak Vilnius	26	17	4	5	66	24	+42	38	Remained for Class B
4	UZB	DO Tashkent	26	13	7	6	45	22	+23	33	Remained for Class B
5	GEO	DO Tbilisi	26	13	6	7	58	27	+31	32	Relegated to republican level
6	LVA	DO Riga	26	13	1	12	52	48	+4	27	Relegated to republican level
7	BLR	Spartak Minsk	26	9	8	9	42	42	0	26	Relegated to republican level
8	ARM	Spartak Yerevan	26	10	5	11	42	48	−6	25	Relegated to republican level
9	KAZ	Dinamo Alma-Ata	26	9	6	11	33	32	+1	24	Remained for Class B
10	BLR	DO Minsk	26	9	6	11	32	39	−7	24	Relegated to republican level
11	MDA	Dinamo Kishinev	26	7	2	17	36	64	−28	16	Remained for Class B
12	EST	Kalev Tallinn	26	3	8	15	17	41	−24	14	Remained for Class B
13	TKM	Lokomotiv Ashkhabad	26	2	5	19	22	67	−45	9	Remained for Class B
14	KGZ	Zenit Frunze	26	3	3	20	19	85	−66	9	Remained for Class B

Source: rsssf.com
Notes:

Notes:

- DO Riga was called Dinamo Riga

==== Subgroup Russia I ====
Pos	Team	Pld	W	D	L	GF	GA	GD	Pts	Qualification or relegation
1	Dinamo Rostov-na-Donu	20	15	4	1	64	13	+51	34	Qualified for Final stage
2	VMS Moskva	20	13	5	2	46	23	+23	31	Remained for Class B
3	Dinamo Krasnodar	20	11	3	6	48	29	+19	25	Relegated to republican level
4	SKIF Moskva	20	8	6	6	28	24	+4	22	Relegated to Moscow championship
5	Traktor Taganrog	20	8	4	8	38	35	+3	20	Relegated to republican level
6	VVS-2 Moskva	20	7	6	7	29	33	−4	20	Dissolved
7	MetroStroi Moskva	20	6	7	7	20	29	−9	19	Relegated to Moscow championship
8	Dinamo Voronezh	20	5	5	10	23	40	−17	15	Relegated to republican level
9	Sudostroitel Kaspiysk	20	5	3	12	26	40	−14	13	Relegated to republican level
10	Sudostroitel Sevastopol	20	6	1	13	30	49	−19	13	Relegated to republican level
11	Pishchevik Astrakhan	20	3	2	15	19	56	−37	8	Relegated to republican level

Source: rsssf.com
Notes:

Notes:

- Metrostroi was called Metro Moskva
- SKIF is an abbreviation for Sports Club of Physical Culture Institute (Sportivnyi Klub Instituta Fizkultury)
- VVS is the club of Stalin's son Vasily Stalin.

==== Subgroup Russia II ====
Pos	Team	Pld	W	D	L	GF	GA	GD	Pts	Qualification or relegation
1	DO Sverdlovsk	26	22	2	2	70	17	+53	46	Qualified for Final stage
2	DO Novosibirsk	26	19	2	5	63	26	+37	40	Relegated to republican level
3	Dzerzhinets Chelyabinsk	26	19	2	5	61	27	+34	40	Remained for Class B
4	Krylya Sovetov Molotov	26	14	6	6	56	34	+22	34	Relegated to republican level
5	UralMash Sverdlovsk	26	12	5	9	65	34	+31	29	Relegated to republican level
6	Dinamo Chelyabinsk	26	11	7	8	36	33	+3	29	Relegated to republican level
7	Metallurg Stalinsk	26	12	3	11	51	52	−1	27	Relegated to republican level
8	Dinamo Sverdlovsk	26	9	7	10	40	43	−3	25	Relegated to republican level
9	Khimik Kemerovo	26	10	4	12	42	41	+1	24	Relegated to republican level
10	Dzerzhinets Nizhniy Tagil	26	7	5	14	32	47	−15	19	Relegated to republican level
11	Bolshevik Omsk	26	9	1	16	41	70	−29	19	Relegated to republican level
12	TsvetMet Kamensk-Uralskiy	26	6	3	17	33	47	−14	15	Relegated to republican level
13	Metallurg Magnitogorsk	26	4	6	16	24	61	−37	14	Relegated to republican level
14	Shakhtyor Kemerovo	26	1	1	24	16	98	−82	3	Relegated to republican level

Source: rsssf.com
Notes:

Notes:

- UralMash was called Avangard Sverdlovsk
- Bolshevik was called Krylia Sovetov Omsk
- Shakhtyor was called Gornyak Kemerovo

==== Subgroup Russia III ====
Pos	Team	Pld	W	D	L	GF	GA	GD	Pts
1	Sudostroitel Leningrad	24	14	8	2	46	20	+26	36
2	DO Leningrad	24	12	10	2	39	20	+19	34
3	Metallurg Moskva	24	13	7	4	65	24	+41	33
4	Torpedo Gorkiy	24	14	5	5	41	19	+22	33
5	MVO Moskva	24	13	5	6	49	27	+22	31
6	Izhevskiy Zavod Izhevsk	24	11	3	10	46	41	+5	25
7	Khimik Dzerzhinsk	24	10	5	9	31	30	+1	25
8	Dinamo Moskva Region	24	8	5	11	38	47	−9	21
9	Dinamo Kazan	24	6	7	11	33	42	−9	19
10	Krylya Sovetov Gorkiy	24	6	6	12	21	29	−8	18
11	Dinamo Saratov	24	6	6	12	25	48	−23	18
12	Spartak Penza	24	5	5	14	33	60	−27	15
13	Spartak Ryazan	24	0	4	20	19	79	−60	4

Source: rsssf.com
Notes:

Notes:

- Izhevskiy Zavod was called Zenit Izhevsk

==== Subgroup Russia IV ====
Pos	Team	Pld	W	D	L	GF	GA	GD	Pts
1	Zenit Kaliningrad (M.R.)	26	16	7	3	45	23	+22	39
2	Stroitel Likino-Dulyovo	26	15	7	4	39	18	+21	37
3	Krasnoye Znamya Orekhovo-Zuyevo	26	13	9	4	45	21	+24	35
4	Krasnoye Znamya Ivanovo	26	12	7	7	48	27	+21	31
5	Khimik Orekhovo-Zuyevo	26	12	7	7	45	32	+13	31
6	Dinamo Vladimir	26	11	7	8	46	32	+14	29
7	Spartak Leningrad	26	8	9	9	31	26	+5	25
8	Kovrov	26	9	7	10	32	33	−1	25
9	Spartak Leningrad Region	26	7	9	10	28	37	−9	23
10	Dzerzhinets Kolomna	26	8	5	13	31	48	−17	21
11	Spartak Noginsk	26	6	8	12	35	47	−12	20
12	Spartak Kalinin	26	3	11	12	22	39	−17	17
13	Zenit Tula	26	6	5	15	36	66	−30	17
14	Spartak Ivanovo	26	3	8	15	23	57	−34	14

Source: rsssf.com
Notes:

Notes:

- Kovrov city team was called Zenit Kovrov

==== Subgroup Ukraine ====
Despite promotion of Shakhtar Stalino and Lokomotyv Kharkiv, the Ukrainian zone was expanded further from 16 to 18 teams. Also the Ukrainian zone was left without Dinamo Kishenev that was relocated to the Central zone. There were no promotions from the 1948 Football Championship of the Ukrainian SSR, instead to the zone were admitted following teams: Spartak Kyiv, Torpedo Kharkiv, Dynamo Chernivtsi, Trudovye Rezervy Voroshylovhrad and DO Lviv. Dynamo Chernivtsi was the only team from the 1948 Ukrainian championship placing 8th out 9 teams in group 10.

Pos	Team	Pld	W	D	L	GF	GA	GD	Pts	Qualification or relegation
1	Kharchovyk Odesa	34	23	4	7	81	36	+45	50	Qualified for the Final stage
2	Spartak Lviv	34	22	5	7	77	44	+33	49	Qualified for the Final stage
3	DO Kyiv	34	20	8	6	93	34	+59	48	Relegated to republican level
4	Spartak Uzhhorod	34	21	6	7	76	31	+45	48	Relegated to republican level
5	Bilshovyk Mukachevo	34	21	5	8	72	38	+34	47	Relegated to republican level
6	Dzerzhinets Kharkiv	34	16	7	11	50	41	+9	39	Relegated to republican level
7	Sudnobudivnyk Mykolaiv	34	12	13	9	40	36	+4	37	Relegated to republican level
8	Spartak Kherson	34	15	6	13	61	51	+10	36	Relegated to republican level
9	Metallurg Dnepropetrovsk	34	16	4	14	55	58	−3	36	Relegated to republican level
10	Spartak Kyiv	34	11	8	15	45	60	−15	30	Relegated to republican level
11	Avangard Kramatorsk	34	12	6	16	51	70	−19	30	Relegated to republican level
12	Torpedo Kharkov	34	10	7	17	41	79	−38	27	Relegated to republican level
13	Dynamo Chernivtsi	34	8	10	16	39	52	−13	26	Relegated to republican level
14	Shakhtyor Kadiyevka	34	9	6	19	40	58	−18	24	Relegated to republican level
15	Trudoviye Rezervy Voroshilovgrad	34	9	6	19	44	59	−15	24	Relegated to republican level
16	Lokomotiv Zaporozhye	34	7	7	20	46	61	−15	21	Relegated to republican level
17	DO Lviv	34	7	6	21	37	90	−53	20	Relegated to republican level
18	Dynamo Voroshilovgrad	34	5	9	20	37	78	−41	19	Relegated to republican level

Source: rsssf.com
Notes:

Notes:

- Metallurg was called Stal Dnepropetrovsk

==== Tier final ====
Pos	REP	Team	Pld	W	D	L	GF	GA	GD	Pts	Qualification or relegation
1	RUS	Zenit Kaliningrad (M.R.)	6	3	1	2	10	7	+3	7	Additional playoff
1	UKR	Pishchevik Odessa	6	2	3	1	6	3	+3	7	Additional playoff
1	GEO	Spartak Tbilisi	6	3	1	2	8	4	+4	7	Additional playoff
4	RUS	Sudostroitel Leningrad	6	1	4	1	6	8	−2	6	Dissolved
5	RUS	DO Sverdlovsk	6	2	1	3	8	10	−2	5	Relegated to republican level
6	RUS	Dinamo Rostov-na-Donu	6	2	1	3	6	10	−4	5	Relegated to republican level
7	UKR	Spartak Lviv	6	2	1	3	3	5	−2	5	Dissolved

Source: rsssf.com

=== Additional final playoff ===
Pos	REP	Team	Pld	W	D	L	GF	GA	GD	Pts	Qualification or relegation
1	GEO	Spartak Tbilisi	2	2	0	0	3	1	+2	4	Promoted to Class A
2	RUS	Zenit Kaliningrad (M.R.)	2	1	0	1	2	2	0	2	Relegated to republican level
3	UKR	Pishchevik Odessa	2	0	0	2	2	4	−2	0	Remained for Class B

Source: rsssf.com

=== Top goalscorers ===
1st Group

- Nikita Simonyan (Spartak Moscow) – 26 goals
