= 1949 Soviet First League =

Vtoraya Gruppa
- Season: 1949
- Champions: Spartak Tbilisi

The 1949 Vtoraya Gruppa of the Soviet football championship was the 10th season of the second tier football competitions in the Soviet Union.

FC Spartak Tbilisi won the championship.

The competition format remained very much the same, however some reorganization took place. There were still 6 groups, however 4 were allotted for the Russian SFSR, one remained after the Ukrainian SSR and only one group was designated for the other union republics. Number of participants once again was increased from 75 to 84. For the first time, in the competitions appeared a second squad which was part of the Stalin's son club VVS Moscow.

For the 1950 season it was decided to reduce number of participants and the tiers of the Soviet Football Championship were renamed Class A (Top League) and Class B (Lower League).

== Teams ==
=== Relegated teams ===
- none

=== Promoted teams ===
- FC Dinamo Krasnodar – Champions of the 1948 Football Championship of the Russian SFSR (debut)
- FC Krasnoye Znamia Orekhovo-Zuevo – Third placed in the 1948 Football Championship of the Russian SFSR (debut)
- FC Zenit Tula – Sixth placed in the 1948 Football Championship of the Russian SFSR (debut)
- FC Dinamo Vladimir – participant of the 1948 Football Championship of the Russian SFSR (debut)
- FC Krylia Sovetov Gorkiy – participant of the 1948 Football Championship of the Russian SFSR (debut)
- FC Sudostroitel Sevastopol – participant of the 1948 Football Championship of the Russian SFSR (debut)
- FC Dinamo Voronezh – participant of the 1948 Football Championship of the Russian SFSR (debut)
- FC Sudostroitel Kaspiysk – participant of the 1948 Football Championship of the Russian SFSR (debut)
- FC Metallurg Stalinsk – participant of the 1948 Football Championship of the Russian SFSR (debut)
- FC Spartak Leningrad Oblast – participant of the 1948 Football Championship of the Russian SFSR (debut)
- FC Torpedo Kharkiv – Fifth placed in the 1948 Football Championship of the Ukrainian SSR (debut)
- FC Dynamo Chernivtsi – participant of the 1948 Football Championship of the Ukrainian SSR (debut)
- FC Spartak Noginsk – (debut)
- FC Spartak Kalinin – (debut)
- FC Spartak Kyiv – (debut)
- FC Dinamo Kutaisi* – (debut)
- VVS-2 Moscow* – (debut)
- FC Spartak Ryazan* – (debut)
- FC Stroitel Likino-Dulyovo* – (debut)
- FC Trudovye Rezervy Voroshilovgrad* – (debut)
- DO Lvov* – (debut)
- With the asterisk identified teams that may have been created just before the start of the season.

=== Renamed teams ===
- DO Riga last season was known as Dinamo Riga
- Metrostroi Moscow last season was known as Metro Moscow
- Uralmash Sverdlovsk last season was known as Avangard Sverdlovsk
- Bolshevik Omsk last season was known as Krylia Sovetov Omsk
- Shakhter Kemerevo last season was known as Gornyak
- Izhevskiy Zavod last season was known as Zenit Izhevsk
- Kovrov last season was known as Zenit Kovrov
- Metallurg Dnepropetrovsk last season was known as Stal Dnepropetrovsk
- SKIF Moscow last season was known as Trudovye Rezervy Moscow. SKIF is an abbreviation for Sports Club of Physical Culture Institute (Sportivnyi Klub Instituta Fizkultury).

== Qualifying stage ==
=== Central Zone ===
Pos	REP	Team	Pld	W	D	L	GF	GA	GD	Pts	Qualification or relegation
1	GEO	Spartak Tbilisi	26	22	3	1	60	18	+42	47	Qualified for the Final stage
2	GEO	Dinamo Kutaisi	26	16	8	2	58	25	+33	40	Relegated to republican level
3	LTU	Spartak Vilnius	26	17	4	5	66	24	+42	38	Remained for Class B
4	UZB	DO Tashkent	26	13	7	6	45	22	+23	33	Remained for Class B
5	GEO	DO Tbilisi	26	13	6	7	58	27	+31	32	Relegated to republican level
6	LVA	DO Riga	26	13	1	12	52	48	+4	27	Relegated to republican level
7	BLR	Spartak Minsk	26	9	8	9	42	42	0	26	Relegated to republican level
8	ARM	Spartak Yerevan	26	10	5	11	42	48	−6	25	Relegated to republican level
9	KAZ	Dinamo Alma-Ata	26	9	6	11	33	32	+1	24	Remained for Class B
10	BLR	DO Minsk	26	9	6	11	32	39	−7	24	Relegated to republican level
11	MDA	Dinamo Kishinev	26	7	2	17	36	64	−28	16	Remained for Class B
12	EST	Kalev Tallinn	26	3	8	15	17	41	−24	14	Remained for Class B
13	TKM	Lokomotiv Ashkhabad	26	2	5	19	22	67	−45	9	Remained for Class B
14	KGZ	Zenit Frunze	26	3	3	20	19	85	−66	9	Remained for Class B

Source: rsssf.com

=== Russian SFSR Zone 1 ===
Pos	Team	Pld	W	D	L	GF	GA	GD	Pts	Qualification or relegation
1	Dinamo Rostov-na-Donu	20	15	4	1	64	13	+51	34	Qualified for Final stage
2	VMS Moskva	20	13	5	2	46	23	+23	31	Remained for Class B
3	Dinamo Krasnodar	20	11	3	6	48	29	+19	25	Relegated to republican level
4	SKIF Moskva	20	8	6	6	28	24	+4	22	Relegated to Moscow championship
5	Traktor Taganrog	20	8	4	8	38	35	+3	20	Relegated to republican level
6	VVS-2 Moskva	20	7	6	7	29	33	−4	20	Dissolved
7	MetroStroi Moskva	20	6	7	7	20	29	−9	19	Relegated to Moscow championship
8	Dinamo Voronezh	20	5	5	10	23	40	−17	15	Relegated to republican level
9	Sudostroitel Kaspiysk	20	5	3	12	26	40	−14	13	Relegated to republican level
10	Sudostroitel Sevastopol	20	6	1	13	30	49	−19	13	Relegated to republican level
11	Pishchevik Astrakhan	20	3	2	15	19	56	−37	8	Relegated to republican level

Source: rsssf.com

=== Russian SFSR Zone 2 (Ural and Siberia) ===
Pos	Team	Pld	W	D	L	GF	GA	GD	Pts	Qualification or relegation
1	DO Sverdlovsk	26	22	2	2	70	17	+53	46	Qualified for Final stage
2	DO Novosibirsk	26	19	2	5	63	26	+37	40	Relegated to republican level
3	Dzerzhinets Chelyabinsk	26	19	2	5	61	27	+34	40	Remained for Class B
4	Krylya Sovetov Molotov	26	14	6	6	56	34	+22	34	Relegated to republican level
5	UralMash Sverdlovsk	26	12	5	9	65	34	+31	29	Relegated to republican level
6	Dinamo Chelyabinsk	26	11	7	8	36	33	+3	29	Relegated to republican level
7	Metallurg Stalinsk	26	12	3	11	51	52	−1	27	Relegated to republican level
8	Dinamo Sverdlovsk	26	9	7	10	40	43	−3	25	Relegated to republican level
9	Khimik Kemerovo	26	10	4	12	42	41	+1	24	Relegated to republican level
10	Dzerzhinets Nizhniy Tagil	26	7	5	14	32	47	−15	19	Relegated to republican level
11	Bolshevik Omsk	26	9	1	16	41	70	−29	19	Relegated to republican level
12	TsvetMet Kamensk-Uralskiy	26	6	3	17	33	47	−14	15	Relegated to republican level
13	Metallurg Magnitogorsk	26	4	6	16	24	61	−37	14	Relegated to republican level
14	Shakhtyor Kemerovo	26	1	1	24	16	98	−82	3	Relegated to republican level

Source: rsssf.com

=== Russian SFSR Zone 3 ===
Pos	Team	Pld	W	D	L	GF	GA	GD	Pts	Qualification or relegation
1	Sudostroitel Leningrad	24	14	8	2	46	20	+26	36	Qualified for Final stage
2	DO Leningrad	24	12	10	2	39	20	+19	34	Relegated to republican level
3	Metallurg Moskva	24	13	7	4	65	24	+41	33	Relegated to republican level
4	Torpedo Gorkiy	24	14	5	5	41	19	+22	33	Remained for Class B
5	MVO Moskva	24	13	5	6	49	27	+22	31	Relegated to republican level
6	Izhevskiy Zavod Izhevsk	24	11	3	10	46	41	+5	25	Relegated to republican level
7	Khimik Dzerzhinsk	24	10	5	9	31	30	+1	25	Relegated to republican level
8	Dinamo Moskva Region	24	8	5	11	38	47	−9	21	Relegated to republican level
9	Dinamo Kazan	24	6	7	11	33	42	−9	19	Relegated to republican level
10	Krylya Sovetov Gorkiy	24	6	6	12	21	29	−8	18	Relegated to republican level
11	Dinamo Saratov	24	6	6	12	25	48	−23	18	Relegated to republican level
12	Spartak Penza	24	5	5	14	33	60	−27	15	Relegated to republican level
13	Spartak Ryazan	24	0	4	20	19	79	−60	4	Relegated to republican level

Source: rsssf.com

=== Russian SFSR Zone 4 ===
Pos	Team	Pld	W	D	L	GF	GA	GD	Pts	Qualification or relegation
1	Zenit Kaliningrad (M.R.)	26	16	7	3	45	23	+22	39	Qualified for Final stage
2	Stroitel Likino-Dulyovo	26	15	7	4	39	18	+21	37	Relegated to republican level
3	Krasnoye Znamya Orekhovo-Zuyevo	26	13	9	4	45	21	+24	35	Relegated to republican level
4	Krasnoye Znamya Ivanovo	26	12	7	7	48	27	+21	31	Remained for Class B
5	Khimik Orekhovo-Zuyevo	26	12	7	7	45	32	+13	31	Relegated to republican level
6	Dinamo Vladimir	26	11	7	8	46	32	+14	29	Relegated to republican level
7	Spartak Leningrad	26	8	9	9	31	26	+5	25	Relegated to republican level
8	Kovrov	26	9	7	10	32	33	−1	25	Relegated to republican level
9	Spartak Leningrad Region	26	7	9	10	28	37	−9	23	Relegated to republican level
10	Dzerzhinets Kolomna	26	8	5	13	31	48	−17	21	Relegated to republican level
11	Spartak Noginsk	26	6	8	12	35	47	−12	20	Relegated to republican level
12	Spartak Kalinin	26	3	11	12	22	39	−17	17	Relegated to republican level
13	Zenit Tula	26	6	5	15	36	66	−30	17	Relegated to republican level
14	Spartak Ivanovo	26	3	8	15	23	57	−34	14	Relegated to republican level

Source: rsssf.com

=== Ukrainian Zone ===
Despite promotion of Shakhtar Stalino and Lokomotyv Kharkiv, the Ukrainian zone was expanded further from 16 to 18 teams. Also the Ukrainian zone was left without Dinamo Kishenev that was relocated to the Central zone. There were no promotions from the 1948 Football Championship of the Ukrainian SSR, instead to the zone were admitted following teams: Spartak Kyiv, Torpedo Kharkiv, Dynamo Chernivtsi, Trudovye Rezervy Voroshylovhrad and DO Lviv. Dynamo Chernivtsi was the only team from the 1948 Ukrainian championship placing 8th out 9 teams in group 10.

Pos	Team	Pld	W	D	L	GF	GA	GD	Pts	Qualification or relegation
1	Kharchovyk Odesa	34	23	4	7	81	36	+45	50	Qualified for the Final stage
2	Spartak Lviv	34	22	5	7	77	44	+33	49	Qualified for the Final stage
3	DO Kyiv	34	20	8	6	93	34	+59	48	Relegated to republican level
4	Spartak Uzhhorod	34	21	6	7	76	31	+45	48	Relegated to republican level
5	Bilshovyk Mukachevo	34	21	5	8	72	38	+34	47	Relegated to republican level
6	Dzerzhinets Kharkiv	34	16	7	11	50	41	+9	39	Relegated to republican level
7	Sudnobudivnyk Mykolaiv	34	12	13	9	40	36	+4	37	Relegated to republican level
8	Spartak Kherson	34	15	6	13	61	51	+10	36	Relegated to republican level
9	Metallurg Dnepropetrovsk	34	16	4	14	54	56	−2	36	Relegated to republican level
10	Spartak Kyiv	34	11	8	15	43	57	−14	30	Relegated to republican level
11	Avanhard Kramatorsk	34	12	6	16	49	69	−20	30	Relegated to republican level
12	Torpedo Kharkov	34	10	7	17	41	79	−38	27	Relegated to republican level
13	Dynamo Chernivtsi	34	8	10	16	39	52	−13	26	Relegated to republican level
14	Shakhtyor Kadiyevka	34	9	6	19	40	58	−18	24	Relegated to republican level
15	Trudoviye Rezervy Voroshilovgrad	34	9	6	19	44	69	−25	24	Relegated to republican level
16	Lokomotiv Zaporozhye	34	7	7	20	46	61	−15	21	Relegated to republican level
17	DO Lviv	34	7	7	20	37	90	−53	21	Relegated to republican level
18	Dynamo Voroshilovgrad	34	5	9	20	35	76	−41	19	Relegated to republican level

Source: rsssf.com

== Final stage ==
Pos	REP	Team	Pld	W	D	L	GF	GA	GD	Pts	Qualification or relegation
1	RUS	Zenit Kaliningrad (M.R.)	6	3	1	2	10	7	+3	7	Additional playoff
1	UKR	Pishchevik Odessa	6	2	3	1	6	3	+3	7	Additional playoff
1	GEO	Spartak Tbilisi	6	3	1	2	8	4	+4	7	Additional playoff
4	RUS	Sudostroitel Leningrad	6	1	4	1	6	8	−2	6	Dissolved
5	RUS	DO Sverdlovsk	6	2	1	3	8	10	−2	5	Relegated to republican level
6	RUS	Dinamo Rostov-na-Donu (H)	6	2	1	3	6	10	−4	5	Relegated to republican level
7	UKR	Spartak Lviv	6	2	1	3	3	5	−2	5	Dissolved

Source: rsssf.com
(H) Hosts

=== Additional final playoff ===
Pos	REP	Team	Pld	W	D	L	GF	GA	GD	Pts	Qualification or relegation
1	GEO	Spartak Tbilisi	2	2	0	0	3	1	+2	4	Promoted to Class A
2	RUS	Zenit Kaliningrad (M.R.)	2	1	0	1	2	2	0	2	Relegated to republican level
3	UKR	Pishchevik Odessa	2	0	0	2	2	4	−2	0	Remained for Class B

Source: rsssf.com

== Number of teams by republics ==
Number	Union republics	Team(s)
52	Russian SFSR	VMS Moscow, FC SKIF Moscow, FC VVS-2 Moskva, FC MetroStroi Moskva, FC Metallurg Moskva, MVO Moskva, FC Sudostroitel Leningrad, DO Leningrad, FC Spartak Leningrad FC Torpedo Gorky, FC Krasnoye Znamya Ivanovo, FC Dzerzhinets Chelyabinsk, FC Dinamo Rostov-na-Donu, FC Dinamo Krasnodar, FC Traktor Taganrog, FC Dinamo Voronezh, FC Sudostroitel Kaspiysk, FC Sudostroitel Sevastopol, FC Pishchevik Astrakhan, DO Sverdlovsk, DO Novosibirsk, FC Krylya Sovetov Molotov, UralMash Sverdlovsk, FC Dinamo Chelyabinsk, FC Metallurg Stalinsk, FC Dinamo Sverdlovsk, FC Khimik Kemerovo, FC Dzerzhinets Nizhniy Tagil, FC Bolshevik Omsk, FC TsvetMet Kamensk-Uralskiy, FC Metallurg Magnitogorsk, FC Shakhtyor Kemerovo, FC Izhevskiy Zavod Izhevsk, FC Khimik Dzerzhinsk, FC Dinamo Moskva Region, FC Dinamo Kazan, FC Krylya Sovetov Gorkiy, FC Dinamo Saratov, FC Spartak Penza, FC Spartak Ryazan, FC Zenit Kaliningrad, FC Stroitel Likino-Dulyovo, FC Krasnoye Znamya Orekhovo-Zuyevo, FC Khimik Orekhovo-Zuyevo, FC Dinamo Vladimir, FC Kovrov, FC Spartak Leningrad Region, FC Dzerzhinets Kolomna, FC Spartak Noginsk, FC Spartak Kalinin, FC Zenit Tula, FC Spartak Ivanovo
18	Ukrainian SSR	FC Pischevik Odessa, FC Spartak Lvov, DO Kiev, FC Spartak Uzhgorod, FC Bolshevik Mukachevo, FC Dzerzhinets Kharkov, FC Sudostroitel Nikolaev, FC Spartak Kherson, FC Metallurg Dnepropetrovsk, FC Spartak Kiev, Avangard Kramatorsk, FC Torpedo Kharkov, FC Dinamo Chernovtsy, FC Shakhter Kadievka, FC Trudovye Rezervy Voroshilovgrad, FC Lokomotiv Zaporozhye, DO Lvov, Dynamo Voroshilovgrad
3	Georgian SSR	FC Spartak Tbilisi, FC Dinamo Kutaisi, DO Tbilisi
2	Belarusian SSR	FC Spartak Minsk, DO Minsk
1	Lithuanian SSR	FC Spartak Vilnius
1	Uzbek SSR	DO Tashkent
1	Latvian SSR	DO Riga
1	Armenian SSR	FC Spartak Yerevan
1	Kazakh SSR	FC Dinamo Alma-Ata
1	Moldavian SSR	FC Dinamo Kishinev
1	Estonian SSR	FC Kalev Tallinn
1	Turkmen SSR	FC Lokomotiv Ashkhabat
1	Kyrgyz SSR	Zenit Frunze

== See also ==
- 1949 Soviet First Group
- 1949 Soviet Cup
