= 1950 in Soviet football =

Football in the Soviet Union
- Season: 1950

Men's football
- Class A: CDKA Moscow
- Class B: VMS Moscow
- Soviet Cup: Spartak Moscow

The 1950 Soviet football championship was the 18th seasons of competitive football in the Soviet Union and the 12th among teams of sports societies and factories. CDKA Moscow won the championship becoming the Soviet domestic champions for the fourth time and continuing the post-war feud against Dinamo.

The championship went through second rebranding and since 1950 the First Group was named as Class A and the Second Group was named as Class B.

The defending champions Dinamo lost eight games this season allowing their main rivals CDKA to retake the title.

== Honours ==
Competition	Winner	Runner-up
Class A	CDKA Moscow (4)	Dinamo Moscow
Class B	VMS Moscow	Torpedo Gorkiy
Soviet Cup	Spartak Moscow (5*)	Dinamo Moscow

Notes = Number in parentheses is the times that club has won that honour. * indicates new record for competition

== Soviet Union football championship ==
=== Class A ===
Pos	Team	Pld	W	D	L	GF	GA	GD	Pts	Qualification
1	(Russian Soviet Federative Socialist Republic) CDKA Moscow (C)	36	20	13	3	91	31	+60	53	League champions
2	(Russian Soviet Federative Socialist Republic) Dynamo Moscow	36	22	6	8	88	36	+52	50	
3	(Georgian Soviet Socialist Republic) Dynamo Tbilisi	36	20	7	9	78	50	+28	47	
4	(Russian Soviet Federative Socialist Republic) VVS Moscow	36	20	5	11	78	52	+26	45	
5	(Russian Soviet Federative Socialist Republic) Spartak Moscow	36	17	10	9	77	40	+37	44	
6	(Russian Soviet Federative Socialist Republic) Zenit Leningrad	36	19	5	12	70	59	+11	43	
7	(Russian Soviet Federative Socialist Republic) Krylia Sovetov Kuybyshev	36	15	10	11	44	44	0	40	
8	(Russian Soviet Federative Socialist Republic) Dynamo Leningrad	36	14	10	12	63	50	+13	38	
9	(Georgian Soviet Socialist Republic) Spartak Tbilisi	36	14	9	13	50	53	−3	37	
10	(Russian Soviet Federative Socialist Republic) Torpedo Moscow	36	13	10	13	57	60	−3	36	
11	(Ukrainian Soviet Socialist Republic) Shakhtyor Stalino	36	13	7	16	49	63	−14	33	
12	(Latvian Soviet Socialist Republic) Daugava Riga	36	12	8	16	37	45	−8	32	
13	(Ukrainian Soviet Socialist Republic) Dynamo Kiev	36	10	11	15	39	53	−14	31	
14	(Armenian Soviet Socialist Republic) Dynamo Yerevan (R)	36	10	11	15	39	57	−18	31	Relegation to Class B
15	(Russian Soviet Federative Socialist Republic) Lokomotiv Moscow (R)	36	11	8	17	41	73	−32	30	Relegation to Class B
16	(Ukrainian Soviet Socialist Republic) Lokomotiv Kharkov (R)	36	12	4	20	33	52	−19	28	Relegation to Class B
17	(Byelorussian Soviet Socialist Republic) Dinamo Minsk (R)	36	9	5	22	44	73	−29	23	Relegation to Class B
18	(Russian Soviet Federative Socialist Republic) Torpedo Stalingrad (R)	36	8	6	22	26	77	−51	22	Relegation to Class B
19	(Azerbaijan Soviet Socialist Republic) Neftyanik Baku (R)	36	6	9	21	37	73	−36	21	Relegation to Class B

Source: rsssf.com
(C) Champions; (R) Relegated

=== Class B ===
Pos	REP	Team	Pld	W	D	L	GF	GA	GD	Pts	Promotion
1	RUS	VMS Moskva	26	18	6	2	60	15	+45	42	Promoted
2	RUS	Torpedo Gorkiy	26	11	12	3	37	18	+19	34	Promoted
3	LTU	Spartak Vilnius (O)	26	13	6	7	53	37	+16	32	Relegation play-off
4	RUS	Krasnoye Znamya Ivanovo	26	13	6	7	31	22	+9	32	
5	UZB	DO Tashkent (O)	26	10	8	8	43	27	+16	28	Relegation play-off
6	MDA	Burevestnik Kishinev (Note: Burevestnik Kishinev was called Dinamo.) (O)	26	11	6	9	41	41	0	28	Relegation play-off
7	RUS	Dzerzhinets Chelyabinsk (R)	26	11	5	10	49	50	−1	27	Relegation play-off
8	UKR	Pishchevik Odessa (R)	26	8	10	8	33	32	+1	26	Relegation play-off
9	KAZ	Dinamo Alma-Ata (O)	26	7	9	10	36	37	−1	23	Relegation play-off
10	KAR	Lokomotiv Petrozavodsk (O)	26	6	10	10	16	27	−11	22	Relegation play-off
11	KGZ	Trudoviye Rezervy Frunze (Note: Trudoviye Rezervy Frunze was called Zenit.) (O)	26	6	8	12	31	50	−19	20	Relegation play-off
12	EST	Kalev Tallinn (O)	26	3	11	12	25	39	−14	17	Relegation play-off
13	TKM	Spartak Ashkhabad (Note: Spartak Ashkhabad was called Lokomotiv.) (O)	26	7	3	16	19	61	−42	17	Relegation play-off
14	TJK	Bolshevik Stalinabad (O)	26	4	8	14	19	37	−18	16	Relegation play-off

Source: rsssf.com
(O) Play-off winners; (R) Relegated

=== Top goalscorers ===
Class A

- Nikita Simonyan (Spartak Moscow) – 34 goals
