= FC Dynamo-2 Kyiv =

- Full name: FC Dynamo-2 Kyiv
- Nickname: Dynamo's second team
- Founded: 1938
- Dissolved: 2016
- Ground: Dynamo Club Stadium, Kyiv
- Capacity: 750
- League: Ukrainian First League
- 2015–16: 11th

FC Dynamo-2 Kyiv was the second football team of the Ukrainian football club Dynamo Kyiv based in Kyiv, Ukraine. The team was first created in 1938, and the club ceased its recent operations again after the 2015–16 season. During the Soviet period, participation of the second squad was sporadic and mostly at republican level, the Football Championship of the Ukrainian SSR.

During the first couple of decades of the Ukrainian second tier (Persha Liha), the team dominated the league competition and won three titles. Later its performance declined, and the club concentrated its effort on its junior squads competing in parallel competitions for the youth.

== History ==
The team existed as early as 1938 when it first played at the top tier of the Ukrainian Football Championship placing 8th among 12 teams. Before the World War II the Ukrainian Football Championship was a tier-structured republican level competition two levels below the 2 tiers All-Union Football League.

Following the World War II, Dynamo Kyiv continued to field its second squad in the Football Championship of the Ukrainian SSR, but under name Dynamo Kyiv for at least four seasons yet, to differentiate it from the team of masters, it was referred to as Dynamo-klubnaya.

In 1965, there was created the second team of FC Dynamo Kyiv and replaced FC Temp Kyiv (that represented the Kyiv Aircraft Factory). It only competed for one season in the Ukrainian Class B football competitions of the Soviet Union.

In 1992, Dynamo-2 Kyiv was revived based on its double (reserve team, Dynamo-d Kyiv) which played in competition for reserves teams of the Soviet Top League. The new team was admitted to the 1992 Ukrainian First League.

In 2004, when there was created a separate competition for reserve teams of the Ukrainian Premier League, the team was preserved and continued to compete at a professional level in regular league competitions until 2016.

The team participated regularly in the Ukrainian First League, since it cannot be promoted to the Ukrainian Premier League, being a reserve team from the FC Dynamo Kyiv franchise. Like most tributary teams, the best players are sent up to the senior team, meanwhile developing other players for further call-ups.

== Honors ==
- Ukrainian First League:
  - Champions (3): 1998–99, 1999–00, 2000–01
  - Runners Up (2): 1996–97, 1997–98

== League and cup history ==
=== Soviet Union ===
Season	Div.	Pos.	Pl.	W	D	L	GS	GA	P	Domestic Cup	Europe	Notes
Dynamo-2 Kyiv
1938	Rep 1	8	11	3	2	6	21	25	19			
1939	Rep 1	9	9	2	1	6	10	13	14			
Dynamo Kyiv
1948	Rep/Gr1	8										
1950	Rep/Gr1	7	18	8	2	8	25	24	18			
1951	Rep/Gr1	8	18	5	1	12	17	20	11			
1956	Rep/Gr3	6	12	3	3	6	13	29	9			
Dynamo-2 Kyiv
1965	3rd	13	30	9	5	16	31	52	23			Zone 2, withdrew after the season

=== Ukraine ===
Season	Div.	Pos.	Pl.	W	D	L	GS	GA	P	Domestic Cup	Europe	Notes
Dynamo-2 Kyiv
1992	2nd "A"	7	26	9	10	7	33	23	28	Did not enter		
1992–93	2nd	15	42	10	17	15	48	39	37	1/16 finals		
1993–94	2nd	7	38	16	8	14	50	37	40	1/64 finals		
1994–95	2nd	7	42	19	8	15	65	40	65	1/16 finals		
1995–96	2nd	6	42	20	12	10	64	42	72	1/8 finals		
1996–97	2nd	2	46	29	8	9	91	33	95	1/16 finals		
1997–98	2nd	2	42	28	9	5	90	31	93	1/32 finals		
1998–99	2nd	1	38	27	7	4	78	27	88	1/64 finals		
1999–00	2nd	1	34	22	7	5	75	21	73	Did not enter		
2000–01	2nd	1	34	18	14	2	61	25	68	Did not enter		
2001–02	2nd	8	34	11	14	9	42	32	47			
2002–03	2nd	3	34	18	10	6	56	28	64			
2003–04	2nd	4	34	18	5	11	65	35	59			
2004–05	2nd	4	34	16	6	12	48	33	54			
2005–06	2nd	5	34	15	7	12	51	36	52			
2006–07	2nd	6	36	17	8	11	53	37	59			
2007–08	2nd	5	38	19	6	13	64	52	63			
2008–09	2nd	8	32	11	14	7	43	42	47			
2009–10	2nd	13	34	12	5	17	35	46	41			
2010–11	2nd	8	34	15	7	12	39	35	52			
2011–12	2nd	8	34	15	5	14	39	39	50			
2012–13	2nd	15	34	8	6	20	31	55	30			Won play-off
2013–14	2nd	14	30	8	8	14	29	30	32			
2014–15	2nd	6	30	12	8	10	35	29	44			
2015–16	2nd	11	30	9	9	12	27	34	36			Withdrew after the season

== Coaches ==
- (Ukraine) Hennadiy Lytovchenko (2006 – 21 Dec 2010)
- (Ukraine) Andriy Husin (21 Dec 2010 – 2 Jul 2013)
- (Belarus) Alyaksandr Khatskevich (2 Jul 2013 – 4 Dec 2014)
- (Ukraine) Vadym Yevtushenko (15 Dec 2014 – Jun 2016)

== See also ==
- Dynamo FC
- Dynamo (sports society)
- FC Dynamo Kyiv Reserves and Youth Team
- FC Dynamo Kyiv
- FC Dynamo-3 Kyiv
