= 1951 Cup of the Ukrainian SSR =

The 1951 Ukrainian Cup was a football knockout competition conducting by the Football Federation of the Ukrainian SSR and was known as the Ukrainian Cup.

== Teams ==
=== Non-participating teams ===
The Ukrainian teams of masters did not take part in the competition.

- 1951 Soviet Class A (2): FC Dynamo Kyiv, FC Shakhtar Stalino
- 1951 Soviet Class B (2): FC Lokomotyv Kharkiv, FC Spartak Uzhhorod

== Competition schedule ==
=== First elimination round ===
DO Kiev	4:0	Spartak Chernihiv
Spartak Zhytomyr	-/+	Vinnytsia team
Lokomotyv Poltava	2:3	Bilshovyk Kyiv
Mashynobudivnyk Sumy	3:0	Kharchovyk Cherkasy
Metalurh Zaporizhia	7:0	Dzerzhynets Kharkiv
Dynamo Dnipropetrovsk	4:0	Khimik Horlivka	2:2 (replay)
Trudovi Rezervy Voroshylovhrad	3:1	Dzerzhynskyi Raion Kharkiv
Metalurh Zhdanov	2:1	Torpedo Dnipropetrovsk
ODO Lvov	3:0	Dynamo Lutsk
Spartak Stanislav	2:1	Naftovyk Drohobych	2:2 (replay)
Dynamo Ternopil	2:1	Dynamo Chernivtsi
Iskra Mukachevo	1:4	Iskra Lviv
Dynamo Izmail	0:4	Metalurh Odessa
Lokomotyv Rivne	3:2	Dynamo Proskuriv
Chervonyi Stiah Mykolaiv	1:2	Traktor Kirovohrad
Spartak Odessa	2:1	Spartak Kherson

=== Second elimination round ===
DO Kiev	6:0	Vinnytsia team
Bilshovyk Kyiv	1:0	Mashynobudivnyk Sumy
Metalurh Zaporizhia	3:0	Dynamo Dnipropetrovsk
Trudovi Rezervy Voroshylovhrad	3:2	Metalurh Zhdanov
Spartak Stanislav	0:3	ODO Lvov
Dynamo Ternopil	0:4	Iskra Lviv
Metalurh Odessa	3:1	Lokomotyv Rivne
Traktor Kirovohrad	3:0	Spartak Odessa

=== Quarterfinals ===
DO Kiev	3:0	Bilshovyk Kyiv
Metalurh Zaporizhia	5:1	Trudovi Rezervy Voroshylovhrad
ODO Lvov	6:1	Iskra Lviv
Metalurh Odessa	4:0	Traktor Kirovohrad

=== Semifinals ===
DO Kiev	1:2	Metalurh Zaporizhia
ODO Lvov	5:2	Metalurh Odessa

=== Final ===
The final was held in Kyiv.

26 July 1951

Metalurh Zaporizhia	4–0	ODO Lvov

Kyiv

== Top goalscorers ==
Scorer	Goals	Team
(Ukrainian Soviet Socialist Republic)	?	

Ukrainian Cup 1951 Winners

FC Mashynobudivnyk Kyiv
Second title

== See also ==
- 1951 Football Championship of the Ukrainian SSR
- 1951 Soviet Cup
