= Vladimir Bulatenko =

Russian professional football player

Personal information
- Full name: Vladimir Andreyevich Bulatenko
- Date of birth: 22 September 1986 (age 40)
- Place of birth: Moscow, Russian SFSR
- Height: 1.87 m (6 ft 2 in)
- Positions: Midfielder; defender

Youth career
- Krylatskoye Moscow

Senior career*
Years	Team	Apps	(Gls)
2005	FC KAMAZ Naberezhnye Chelny	0	(0)
2006	FC Spartak Lukhovitsy	26	(0)
2007	FC Yelets	26	(2)
2008	FC Dynamo-Voronezh	25	(1)
2009	FC Chita	34	(0)
2010	FC Shinnik Yaroslavl	1	(0)
2010	FC Torpedo Moscow	9	(0)
2011–2014	FC Kaluga	71	(4)
2014–2015	FC Dynamo Bryansk	20	(0)
- * Club domestic league appearances and goals

Vladimir Andreyevich Bulatenko (Russian: Владимир Андреевич Булатенко; born 22 September 1986) is a Russian former professional football player.

== Club career ==
He played two seasons in the Russian Football National League for FC Chita and FC Shinnik Yaroslavl.
