= 1951 Soviet Class B =

Soviet Class B
- Season: 1951

Following are the results of the 1951 Class B football championship. FC MVO Moscow winning the championship.

== Teams ==
=== Relegated teams ===
Six teams were relegated from the 1950 Soviet Class A (top tier).

- Dinamo Minsk (return after a six-year absence)
- Lokomotiv Moscow (return after a three-year absence)
- Neftianik Baku (return after a two-year absence)
- Torpedo Stalingrad (debut)
- Lokomotiv Kharkov (return after a two-year absence)
- Dinamo Yerevan

=== Promoted teams ===
No teams received direct promotion. Only three teams were promoted from republican competitions through last year's post-season playoffs. One more was replaced, Lokomotiv for Krasnaya Zvezda.

== Final standings ==
Pos	Rep	Team	Pld	W	D	L	GF	GA	GD	Pts	Promotion
1	RUS	MVO Kalinin	34	19	11	4	62	26	+36	49	Promoted to Class A
2	BLR	Dinamo Minsk	34	21	7	6	57	30	+27	49	Promoted to Class A
3	RUS	Lokomotiv Moskva	34	19	10	5	72	38	+34	48	Promoted to Class A
4	AZE	Neftyanik Baku	34	17	11	6	56	27	+29	45	
5	RUS	Torpedo Stalingrad	34	16	11	7	66	38	+28	43	
6	UKR	Lokomotiv Kharkov	34	17	9	8	60	38	+22	43	
7	LTU	Spartak Vilnius	34	15	9	10	47	40	+7	39	
8	ARM	Dinamo Yerevan	34	14	10	10	40	22	+18	38	
9	UKR	Spartak Uzhgorod (R)	34	14	9	11	51	41	+10	37	Relegated after play-off
10	MDA	Burevestnik Kishinev	34	12	10	12	47	37	+10	34	
11	RUS	Krasnoye Znamya Ivanovo	34	13	7	14	49	49	0	33	
12	KAR	Krasnaya Zvezda Petrozavodsk (Note: Krasnaya Zvezda Petrozavodsk replaced withdrawn Lokomotiv)	34	10	9	15	28	39	−11	29	
13	UZB	DO Tashkent	34	10	7	17	30	48	−18	27	
14	EST	Kalev Tallinn	34	9	7	18	31	48	−17	25	
15	TJK	Dinamo Stalinabad (Note: Dinamo Stalinabad replaced withdrawn Bolshevik)	34	10	5	19	33	74	−41	25	
16	KGZ	Trudoviye Rezervy Frunze	34	7	7	20	36	67	−31	21	Relegated
17	KAZ	Dinamo Alma-Ata	34	6	8	20	30	59	−29	20	
18	TKM	Spartak Ashkhabad	34	2	3	29	17	91	−74	7	

Source: rsssf.com
(R) Relegated

== Relegation play-off ==
To the play-off qualified the champion of the 1951 Football Championship of the Ukrainian SSR and the worst Ukrainian team of masters of the 1951 Soviet Class B.

Team 1	Agg.	Team 2	1st leg	2nd leg
Spartak Uzhgorod	2–3	DO Kiev	0–0	2–3

== Number of teams by republics ==
Number	Union republics	Team(s)
4	Russian SFSR	MVO Kalinin, FC Lokomotiv Moscow, FC Torpedo Stalingrad, FC Krasnoye Znamya Ivanovo
2	Ukrainian SSR	FC Lokomotiv Kharkov, FC Spartak Uzhgorod
1	Belarusian SSR	FC Dinamo Minsk
1	Azerbaijan SSR	FC Neftianik Baku
1	Lithuanian SSR	FC Spartak Vilnius
1	Armenian SSR	FC Dinamo Yerevan
1	Moldavian SSR	FC Burevestnik Kishinev
1	Karelo-Finnish SSR	FC Krasnaya Zvezda Petrozavodsk
1	Uzbek SSR	DO Tashkent
1	Estonian SSR	FC Kalev Tallinn
1	Tajik SSR	FC Dinamo Stalinobad
1	Kyrgyz SSR	FC Trudovye Rezervy Frunze
1	Kazakh SSR	FC Dinamo Alma-Ata
1	Turkmen SSR	FC Spartak Asgabat

== See also ==
- 1951 Soviet Class A
- 1951 Soviet Cup
