= 1950 Soviet Class B =

Soviet Class B
- Season: 1950

The 1950 Soviet football championship Class B was the 11th season of the Soviet football championship second tier and inaugural season of the Class B (predecessor of Soviet First League). In 1950 the Soviet football championship rebranded its both tiers from groups First (Pervaya Gruppa) and Second (Vtoraya Gruppa) to Classes A and B.

FC VMS Moscow won the championship.

== Organization ==
The league was reduced from a multi-group tournament to single group to which were grandfathered seven teams from last season "Central Zone" and one team from every other zones, also two more teams were promoted. Many teams from last season were forced into relegation to their respective republican competitions.

=== Promoted teams ===
- Lokomotiv Petrozavodsk (debut, runner-up of the Karelo-Finnish Championship)
- Bolshevik Stalinabad (debut, newly established team from the Tajik Soviet Socialist Republic)
  - Bolshevik were promoted ahead of the republican champions Dynamo Stalinabad

=== Relegated teams ===
No teams were relegated from the 1949 Soviet Pervaya Gruppa (top tier)

== Final standings ==
Pos	REP	Team	Pld	W	D	L	GF	GA	GD	Pts	Promotion
1	RUS	VMS Moskva	26	18	6	2	60	15	+45	42	Promoted
2	RUS	Torpedo Gorkiy	26	11	12	3	37	18	+19	34	Promoted
3	LTU	Spartak Vilnius (O)	26	13	6	7	53	37	+16	32	Relegation play-off
4	RUS	Krasnoye Znamya Ivanovo	26	13	6	7	31	22	+9	32	
5	UZB	DO Tashkent (O)	26	10	8	8	43	27	+16	28	Relegation play-off
6	MDA	Burevestnik Kishinev (Note: Burevestnik Kishinev was called Dinamo.) (O)	26	11	6	9	41	41	0	28	Relegation play-off
7	RUS	Dzerzhinets Chelyabinsk (R)	26	11	5	10	49	50	−1	27	Relegation play-off
8	UKR	Pishchevik Odessa (R)	26	8	10	8	33	32	+1	26	Relegation play-off
9	KAZ	Dinamo Alma-Ata (O)	26	7	9	10	36	37	−1	23	Relegation play-off
10	KAR	Lokomotiv Petrozavodsk (O)	26	6	10	10	16	27	−11	22	Relegation play-off
11	KGZ	Trudoviye Rezervy Frunze (Note: Trudoviye Rezervy Frunze was called Zenit.) (O)	26	6	8	12	31	50	−19	20	Relegation play-off
12	EST	Kalev Tallinn (O)	26	3	11	12	25	39	−14	17	Relegation play-off
13	TKM	Spartak Ashkhabad (Note: Spartak Ashkhabad was called Lokomotiv.) (O)	26	7	3	16	19	61	−42	17	Relegation play-off
14	TJK	Bolshevik Stalinabad (O)	26	4	8	14	19	37	−18	16	Relegation play-off

Source: rsssf.com
(O) Play-off winners; (R) Relegated

== Relegation play-off ==
=== Ukrainian SSR ===
To the play-off qualified the champion of the 1950 Football Championship of the Ukrainian SSR and the worst Ukrainian team of masters of the 1950 Soviet Class B.

Team 1	Agg.	Team 2	1st leg	2nd leg
Pishchevik Odessa	1–2	Spartak Uzhgorod	1–1	0–1

=== Russian SFSR ===
Worst team of the Russian SFSR qualified for relegation playoff. Both matches were taken place in Makhachkala. The city of Kalinin were champions of the 1950 Football Championship of the Russian SFSR.

Team 1	Agg.	Team 2	1st leg	2nd leg
Dzerzhinets Chelyabinsk	2–7	Kalinin city	1–0	1–7

For 1950 MVO Moscow was stationed in city of Kalinin.

=== Turkmen SSR ===
Team 1	Agg.	Team 2	1st leg	2nd leg
Spartak Ashkhabat	6–4	ODO Ashkhabat	4–3	2–1

=== Karelo-Finnish SSR ===
Team 1	Agg.	Team 2	1st leg	2nd leg
Lokomotiv Petrozavodsk	4–1	ODO Petrozavodsk	3–1	1–0

=== Lithuanian SSR ===
Team 1	Agg.	Team 2	1st leg	2nd leg
Spartak Vilnius	7–3	Inkaras Kaunas	5–1	2–2

=== Belarusian SSR ===
Team 1	Agg.	Team 2	1st leg	2nd leg
Dinamo Minsk	0–2	ODO Minsk	0–1	0–1

Team 1	Agg.	Team 2	1st leg	2nd leg
Dinamo Minsk	2–1	ODO Minsk	1–1	1–0

=== Kazakh SSR ===
Team 1	Agg.	Team 2	1st leg	2nd leg
Dinamo Alma-Ata	2–0	Dinamo Alma-Ata (reserves)	1–0	1–0

=== Moldavian SSR ===
Team 1	Agg.	Team 2	1st leg	2nd leg
Burevestnik Kishinev	10–3	Krasnoye Znamia Kishinev	7–2	3–1

=== Uzbek SSR ===
Team 1	Agg.	Team 2	1st leg	2nd leg
ODO Tashkent	4–0	Spartak Tashkent	2–0	2–0

=== Estonian SSR ===
Team 1	Agg.	Team 2	1st leg	2nd leg
Kalev Tallinn	10–2	Dinamo Tallinn	3–0	7–2

=== Tajik SSR ===
Team 1	Agg.	Team 2	1st leg	2nd leg
Bolshevik Stalinabad	w/o	Dinamo Stalinabad		

=== Kyrgyz SSR ===
Team 1	Agg.	Team 2	1st leg	2nd leg
Trudovye Rezervy Frunze	w/o	Spartak Frunze		

== Number of teams by republics ==
Number	Union republics	Team(s)
4	Russian SFSR	VMS Moscow FC Torpedo Gorky, FC Krasnoye Znamya Ivanovo, FC Dzerzhinets Chelyabinsk
1	Karelo-Finnish SSR	FC Lokomotiv Petrozavodsk
1	Lithuanian SSR	FC Spartak Vilnius
1	Uzbek SSR	DO Tashkent
1	Moldavian SSR	FC Burevestnik Kishinev
1	Ukrainian SSR	FC Pischevik Odessa
1	Kazakh SSR	FC Dinamo Alma-Ata
1	Kyrgyz SSR	FC Trudovye Rezervy Frunze
1	Estonian SSR	FC Kalev Tallinn
1	Turkmen SSR	FC Spartak Asgabat
1	Tajik SSR	FC Bolshevik Stalinobad

== See also ==
- 1950 Soviet Class A
- 1950 Soviet Cup
