= FC Sudnostroitel Sevastopol =

FC Sudnostroitel Sevastopol (Russian: Судностроитель (Севастополь)) was a Soviet club from Crimea, Russian SFSR that was founded in 1923 as Yuzhny Metallist (Sevastopol). Sometime prior to 1936 it carried name of the Ordzhonikidze Marine Factory (Sevastopol).

== History ==
Previous names:

- 1923–????: Yuzhnyi Metallist Sevastopol (Russian: «Южный металлист» Севастополь)
- ????–1936: Morskoi Zavod im. S. Ordzhonikidze Sevastopol (Russian: Морской завод им. С. Орджоникидзе Севастополь)
- 1937–????: Sudnostroitel Sevastopol (Russian: «Судностроитель» Севастополь)

The football team Yuzhnyi Metallist Sevastopol (Russian: «Южный металлист") was founded in Sevastopol in 1923 and represented the Sevastopol Shipyard (Morskoi Zavod im. S. Ordzhonikidze Sevastopol).

In the years 1936–1938 the team competed in the Soviet Cup. In 1937 the club adopted the name Sudnostroitel Sevastopol. He appeared in the Championship of Russian FSSR and the Cup of Russian FSSR and local tournaments. In 1947 he won the championship of the Crimea.

In 1949, the club debuted in the Soviet First League, but then played in local competitions.

== League and cup history (Soviet Union) ==
Season	Div.	Pos.	Pl.	W	D	L	GS	GA	P	Domestic Cup	Europe	Notes
1937	...									1/64 finals		
1938	...									Zone 19, final		
...
1949	2nd First League, Russian SSR Gr. 1	10_{/11}	20	6	1	13	30	49	13	Zone 1 Russian SSR, 1/2 finals		Relegated
