= 1951 Soviet Cup =

1951 Cup of USSR in Football
Кубок СССР

Tournament details
- Country: Soviet Union
- Dates: August 11 – October 14
- Teams: 51

Final positions
- Champions: CDSA Moscow
- Runners-up: MVO Kalinin

The 1951 Soviet Cup was an association football cup competition of the Soviet Union.

== Participating teams ==
Enter in First round
Class A 15/15 teams	Class B 18/18 teams	Republican 18 teams
✓ CDKA Moscow; ✓ Dinamo Tbilisi; ✓ Shakhter Stalino; ✓ Krylia Sovetov Kuibyshev; ✓ Dinamo Moscow; ✓ Spartak Moscow; ✓ Zenit Leningrad; ✓ Dinamo Kiev; ✓ Dinamo Leningrad; ✓ VVS Moscow; ✓ Daugava Riga; ✓ Torpedo Moscow; ✓ VMS Moscow; ✓ Spartak Tbilisi; ✓ Torpedo Gorkiy	✓ MVO Kalinin; ✓ Dynamo Minsk; ✓ Lokomotiv Moscow; ✓ Neftianik Baku; ✓ Torpedo Stalingrad; ✓ Lokomotiv Kharkov; ✓ Spartak Vilnius; ✓ Dinamo Yerevan; ✓ Spartak Uzhgorod; ✓ Burevestnik Kishenev; ✓ Krasnoye Znamia Ivanovo; ✓ Krasnaya Zvezda Petrozavodsk; ✓ DO Tashkent; ✓ Kalev Tallinn; ✓ Dinamo Stalinabad; ✓ Trudovye Rezervy Frunze; ✓ Dinamo Alma-Ata; ✓ Spartak Ashkhabad	✓ Lokomotiv Petrozavodsk (Karelia); ✓ KBF Tallinn (Estonia); ✓ DO Riga (Latvia); ✓ Inkaras Kaunas (Lithuania); ✓ ODO Minsk (Belarus); ✓ Metallurg Zaporozhye (Ukraine); ✓ Krasnoye Znamia Kishenev (Moldova); ✓ Trud (TTU) Tbilisi (Georgia); ✓ Stroitel Leninakan (Armenia); ✓ Zavod im.Budennogo Baku (Azerbaijan); ✓ Dinamo-2 Alma-Ata (Kazakhstan); ✓ Krylya Sovetov Tashkent (Uzbekistan); ✓ Dinamo Frunze (Kirgizia); ✓ DO Stalinabad (Tajikistan); ✓ Lokomotiv Mary (Turkmenia); ✓ DO Novosibirsk (RSFSR); ✓ VVS-2 Moscow; ✓ Infizkult Leningrad

Source: []

== Competition schedule ==
=== First round ===
[Aug 12] 
Inkaras Kaunas                   0-3  LOKOMOTIV Moskva              [aet] 
  [Viktor Stroke, Boris Pirogov, Suetin] 
METALLURG Zaporozhye             1-0  Dinamo Minsk 
  [V.Oleinik 87] 
SPARTAK Moskva                   3-1  DO Novosibirsk 
  [Nikita Simonyan 8, Viktor Terentyev 75, Alexei Paramonov 88 – A.Afanasyev 20] 
[Aug 15] 
Dinamo Frunze                    2-4  DO Tashkent                   [aet] 
  [Malyarenko, Karabajak – Kravchenko-3, Adamovich] 
[Aug 16] 
VVS-2 Moskva                     2-6  SPARTAK Uzhgorod              [aet]   
  [Bobrov-2 (1 pen) – Vanzel-2, Grubchak, Kesler, Nad, P.Kotov (V) og] 
[Aug 22] 
DINAMO Stalinabad                4-0  DO Stalinabad 
  [N.Shakirov, F.Rukavishnikov, Y.Kuzmin, B.Gachegov]

=== Second round ===
[Aug 9] 
SHAKHTYOR Stalino                3-2  Spartak Ashkhabad      [in Moskva] 
  [Viktor Kolesnikov, Dmitriy Ivanov, Viktor Fomin – I.Pavlidi, Borkin] 
[Aug 11] 
DO Riga                          1-0  Dinamo Alma-Ata 
  [Kapustin 88] 
[Aug 12] 
InFizKult Leningrad              0-1  TORPEDO Moskva                [aet] 
  [Vladimir Nechayev 98] 
Krasnoye Znamya Kishinev         0-1  MVO Kalinin 
  [Alexandr Shcherbakov] 
[Aug 13] 
Dinamo-2 Alma-Ata                2-4  DINAMO Leningrad 
  [Volozhenko, Gilev – German Zonin, Vasiliy Lotkov, Vladimir Solovyov, Vladimir Tsvetkov] 
[Aug 14] 
DINAMO Yerevan                   2-1  Stroitel Leninakan            [aet] 
  [G.Karmiryan, Amazasp Mkhoyan – A.Boyajan] 
[Aug 15] 
DO Minsk                         1-2  VVS Moskva 
  [M.Vorobyov 20 pen – Karo Shirinyan 4, 7] 
Lokomotiv Petrozavodsk           0-11 DINAMO Tbilisi 
  [Avtandil Gogoberidze-3, Andrei Zazroyev-2, Boris Paichadze-2, Avtandil Chkuaseli-2, Konstantin Gagnidze, Georgiy Antadze] 
ZiB Baku                         0-4  LOKOMOTIV Kharkov 
  [Mikhail Solovyov-2, Anatoliy Gorokhov, Georgiy Borzenko] 
[Aug 16] 
KBF Tallinn                      3-0  Krasnaya Zvezda Petrozavodsk  
  [Y.Pevtsov 14, 47, 55] 
[Aug 19] 
METALLURG Zaporozhye             4-0  Lokomotiv Moskva 
  [Fedortsev-2 (1 pen), O.Kiknadze, V.Oleinik] 
SPARTAK Moskva                   5-1  Spartak Uzhgorod 
  [Viktor Terentyev-2, Nikita Simonyan, Sergei Rudnev, Nikolai Dementyev - Fyodor Vanzel] 
[Aug 21] 
Lokomotiv Mary                   0-4  DO Tashkent          [in Ashkhabad] 
  [Adamovich-2, Kravchenko-2] 
[Aug 30] 
KRYLYA SOVETOV Tashkent          3-1  Dinamo Stalinabad 
  [A.Nikitin, V.Makarov, I.Malin – K.Shakirov] 
TRUD Tbilisi                     w/o  Trudoviye Rezervy Frunze

=== Third round ===
[Aug 12] 
Neftyanik Baku                   0-2  DAUGAVA Riga 
  [Pyotr Katrovskiy-2] 
[Aug 14] 
KRASNOYE ZNAMYA Ivanovo          3-1  Burevestnik Kishinev 
  [N.Voronin, V.Fedichkin, Y.Zabrodin – N.Voronkov] 
[Aug 16] 
TORPEDO Gorkiy                   3-2  Spartak Tbilisi               [aet] 
  [Vladimir Nenastin ?, Vladimir Lazarev ?, Viktor Gorbunov 100 pen – Zaur Kaloyev 17, 89] 
[Aug 18] 
CDSA Moskva                      5-0  VMS Moskva 
  [Valentin Nikolayev-3, Alexei Grinin, Vyacheslav Solovyov] 
[Aug 19] 
Dinamo Leningrad                 0-1  MVO Kalinin 
  [Alexandr Shcherbakov 33] 
DINAMO Yerevan                   2-1  DO Riga 
  [Arutyun Kegeyan, Ilya Mkrtchan – V.Kapustin] 
Kalev Tallinn                    0-1  SPARTAK Vilnius 
  [Martinas Dauksa 80] 
KRYLYA SOVETOV Kuibyshev         2-0  Torpedo Moskva 
  [Fyodor Novikov 7, Alexandr Gulevskiy ?] 
[Aug 20] 
VVS Moskva                       5-1  Dinamo Tbilisi 
  [Vasiliy Volkov 7, Sergei Korshunov 11, 25, Viktor Panyukov (D) 40 og, Viktor Fyodorov 88 – Konstantin Gagnidze 63] 
[Aug 21] 
Lokomotiv Kharkov                1-3  SHAKHTYOR Stalino 
  [Anatoliy Gorokhov – Leonid Savinov, Dmitriy Ivanov, Alexandr Ponomaryov] 
[Aug 22] 
TRUD Tbilisi                     4-0  KBF Tallinn 
  [Sh.Matrineshvili-2, O.Kuchaidze, M.Gabaladze] 
[Sep 20] 
Torpedo Stalingrad               0-2  ZENIT Leningrad 
  [Ivan Komarov 52, 83] 
[Sep 22] 
SPARTAK Moskva                   8-2  DO Tashkent 
  [Nikita Simonyan-3, Viktor Terentyev-2, Alexandr Obotov, Alexei Paramonov, Alexandr Rystsov – Sedov (S) og, Klimanov] 
[Sep 26] 
METALLURG Zaporozhye             9-2  Krylya Sovetov Tashkent 
  [P.Ponomaryov-5, B.Zozulya, V.Oleinik, S.Vasilyev, G.Sushko – Nikitin, Ahunjanov]

=== Fourth round ===
[Aug 19] 
DAUGAVA Riga                     3-2  Krasnoye Znamya Ivanovo 
  [Alfons Jegers, Hugo Prieditis, V.Fedin – M.Krainov, V.Strakhov] 
[Aug 22] 
CDSA Moskva                      4-3  Torpedo Gorkiy 
  [Vladimir Yelizarov 14, Vladimir Dyomin 24, Alexei Grinin ?, ? pen – Jesus Varela 46, Vladimir Nenastin ?, Yuriy Shebilov 80] 
[Aug 25] 
KRYLYA SOVETOV Kuibyshev         2-0  Spartak Vilnius         [in Moskva] 
  [Boris Smyslov, Viktor Voroshilov] 
[Aug 27] 
MVO Kalinin                      2-1  Dinamo Yerevan          [in Moskva] 
  [Alexandr Shcherbakov 9, Nikolai Yakovlev 60 – Armenak Durgaryan 44] 
[Sep 20] 
VVS Moskva                       3-1  Trud Tbilisi                  [aet] 
  [Vasiliy Volkov 84, Sergei Korshunov 114, 118 – V.Shakhnazarov 8] 
[Sep 29] 
Shakhtyor Stalino                1-1  Zenit Leningrad         [in Moskva] 
  [Vladimir Gavrilenko 28 – Friedrich Maryutin 55] 
[Sep 30] 
SPARTAK Moskva                   1-0  Dinamo Kiev 
  [Alexei Paramonov 66] 
[Oct 1] 
DINAMO Moskva                    5-1  Metallurg Zaporozhye 
  [Ivan Konov 27, 58, Sergei Salnikov 39, 59, Vasiliy Trofimov 62 – Zozulya 65]

==== Fourth round replays ====
[Sep 30, Moskva] 
SHAKHTYOR Stalino                3-1  Zenit Leningrad 
  [Viktor Kolesnikov 20, 42, Viktor Fomin 21 – Ivan Komarov 32]

=== Quarterfinals ===
[Oct 2] 
CDSA Moskva                      1-1  Krylya Sovetov Kuibyshev 
  [Vladimir Yelizarov ? – Viktor Voroshilov 50 pen] 
[Oct 3] 
SHAKHTYOR Stalino                2-1  Daugava Riga            [in Moskva] 
  [Alexandr Ponomaryov, Dmitriy Ivanov – Pyotr Katrovskiy] 
[Oct 4] 
VVS Moskva                       3-2  Spartak Moskva                [aet] 
  [Sergei Korshunov 2, 101, Vasiliy Volkov 103 – Alexei Paramonov 30, Igor Netto 107] 
[Oct 5] 
Dinamo Moskva                    1-4  MVO Kalinin 
  [Alexandr Sokolov 83 – Anatoliy Akimov 28, 87, Vladimir Dobrikov 64, Alexandr Shcherbakov 85]

==== Quarterfinals replays ====
[Oct 3] 
CDSA Moskva                      4-1  Krylya Sovetov Kuibyshev 
  [Alexei Grinin-2, Boris Koverznev, Vladimir Dyomin – Viktor Voroshilov]

=== Semifinals ===
[Oct 8] 
CDSA Moskva                      1-0  VVS Moskva 
  [Yevgeniy Rogov (V) 15 og] 
[Oct 9] 
MVO Kalinin                      1-0  Shakhtyor Stalino       [in Moskva] 
  [Vladimir Dobrikov 42]

=== Final ===
14 October 1951

CDSA Moscow	2 – 1	MVO Kalinin
Solovyov 37'; Koverznev 41'	[ Report]	Yakovlev 43'

Moscow
- Note: the game was annulled.

==== Replay ====
17 October 1951

CDSA Moscow	2 – 1 (a.e.t.)	MVO Kalinin
Solovyov 72'; Grinin 115'	[ Report]	Chistokhvalov 25' (o.g.)

Moscow
