= 1951 Football Championship of the Ukrainian SSR =

Football Championship of UkrSSR
- Season: 1951
- Champions: DO Kyiv
- Promoted: DO Kyiv

The 1951 Football Championship of UkrSSR were part of the 1951 Soviet republican football competitions in the Soviet Ukraine.

== Qualification group stage ==
=== Group 1 ===
Pos	Team	Pld	W	D	L	GF	GA	GD	Pts
1	DO Kyiv	18	14	1	3	96	10	+86	29
2	Dynamo Vinnytsia	18	11	5	2	33	17	+16	27
3	Lokomotyv Rivne	18	12	1	5	45	34	+11	25
4	Lokomotyv Poltava	18	11	2	5	37	17	+20	24
5	Spartak Zhytomyr	18	10	2	6	35	27	+8	22
6	Dynamo Proskuriv	18	8	0	10	18	41	−23	16
7	Spartak Chernihiv	18	5	3	10	17	37	−20	13
8	Dynamo Kyiv	18	5	1	12	17	20	−3	11
9	Kolhospnyk Karlivka	18	3	1	14	11	65	−54	7
10	Kolhospnyk Mohyliv-Podilskyi	18	2	2	14	9	50	−41	6

=== Group 2 ===
Pos	Team	Pld	W	D	L	GF	GA	GD	Pts
1	Metalurh Zaporizhia	18	12	5	1	67	14	+53	29
2	Dynamo Dnipropetrovsk	18	12	4	2	32	14	+18	28
3	Torpedo Dnipropetrovsk	18	9	5	4	37	16	+21	23
4	Metalurh Kostyantynivka	0	–	–	–	–	–	—	0
5	Lokomotyv Artemivsk	0	–	–	–	–	–	—	0
6	Mashynobudivnyk Sumy	0	–	–	–	–	–	—	0
7	Metalurh Staline	18	5	5	8	22	24	−2	15
8	Traktor Kharkiv	0	–	–	–	–	–	—	0
9	Budivelnyk Zhdanov	0	–	–	–	–	–	—	0
10	Shakhtar Rutchenkove	18	1	3	14	9	54	−45	5

=== Group 3 ===
Pos	Team	Pld	W	D	L	GF	GA	GD	Pts
1	Trudovi Rezervy Voroshylovhrad	0	–	–	–	–	–	—	0
2	Metalurh Zhdanov	18	10	4	4	35	18	+17	24
3	Khimik Horlivka	0	–	–	–	–	–	—	0
4	Metalurh Voroshylovsk	0	–	–	–	–	–	—	0
5	Avanhard Kramatorsk	0	–	–	–	–	–	—	0
6	Metalurh Makiivka	0	–	–	–	–	–	—	0
7	Shakhtar Kadiivka	0	–	–	–	–	–	—	0
8	Dzerzhynets Kharkiv	0	–	–	–	–	–	—	0
9	Shakhtar Yenakieve	0	–	–	–	–	–	—	0
10	Iskra Kharkiv	0	–	–	–	–	–	—	0

=== Group 4 ===
Pos	Team	Pld	W	D	L	GF	GA	GD	Pts
1	Spartak Kherson	18	13	2	3	49	14	+35	28
2	Chervonyi Prapor Mykolaiv	18	12	3	3	42	14	+28	27
3	Spartak Odesa	18	11	4	3	48	12	+36	26
4	Metalurh Dniprodzerzhynsk	18	11	4	3	40	15	+25	26
5	Metalurh Odesa	18	8	5	5	33	17	+16	21
6	Traktor Kirovohrad	0	–	–	–	–	–	—	0
7	Metalurh Kryvyi Rih	0	–	–	–	–	–	—	0
8	Lokomotyv Zaporizhia	18	6	1	11	24	48	−24	13
9	Vodnyk Izmail	0	–	–	–	–	–	—	0
10	Kolhospnyk Ulianivka	18	1	1	16	9	70	−61	3

=== Group 5 ===
Pos	Team	Pld	W	D	L	GF	GA	GD	Pts
1	DO Lviv	18	14	2	2	60	16	+44	30
2	Dynamo Chernivtsi	18	13	0	5	24	21	+3	26
3	Kolhospnyk Berehove	18	10	2	6	38	24	+14	22
4	Iskra Mukacheve	18	10	2	6	27	28	−1	22
5	Spartak Stanislav	0	–	–	–	–	–	—	0
6	Kharchovyk Vynnyky	18	8	1	9	35	39	−4	17
7	Stanislav	18	6	2	10	18	11	+7	14
8	Naftovyk Drohobych	18	5	3	10	23	36	−13	13
9	Kolhospnyk Stryi	0	–	–	–	–	–	—	0
10	Dynamo Lutsk	18	3	2	13	7	45	−38	8

== Final ==
Pos	Team	Pld	W	D	L	GF	GA	GD	Pts	Qualification
1	DO Kyiv	6	4	2	0	11	4	+7	10	Play-off
2	DO Lviv	6	4	1	1	16	6	+10	9	
3	FC Mashynobudivnyk Kyiv	6	2	4	0	11	8	+3	8	
4	FC Metalurh Zaporizhia	6	1	4	1	8	6	+2	6	
5	FC Spartak Kherson	6	2	0	4	12	19	−7	4	
6	FC Trudovi Rezervy Voroshylovhrad	6	0	3	3	6	14	−8	3	
7	FC Kolhospnyk Berehovo	6	0	2	4	8	15	−7	2	

== Promotional playoff ==
- FC Spartak Uzhhorod – DO Kyiv 0:0 2:3

== Ukrainian clubs at the All-Union level ==
- Class A (2): Shakhtar Stalino, Dynamo Kyiv
- Class B (2): Lokomotyv Kharkiv, Spartak Uzhhorod

== Number of teams by region ==
Number	Region	Team(s)	
Number	Region	Ukrainian SSR	All-Union
10 (1)	Donetsk Oblast	Metalurh Kostiantynivka, Lokomotyv Artemivsk, Metalurh Stalino, Budivelnyk Zhdanov, Shakhtar Rutchenkove, Metalurh Zhdanov, Khimik Horlivka, Avanhard Kramatorsk, Metalurh Makiivka, Shakhtar Yenakieve	Stakhanovets Stalino
4 (0)	Dnipropetrovsk Oblast	Dynamo Dnipropetrovsk, Torpedo Dnipropetrovsk, Metalurh Dniprodzerzhynsk, Metalurh Kryvyi Rih	–
3 (1)	Kharkiv Oblast	Traktor Kharkiv, Dzerzhynets Kharkiv, Iskra Kharkiv	Lokomotyv Kharkiv
3 (0)	Luhansk Oblast	Trudovi Rezervy Voroshylovhrad, Metalurh Voroshylovsk, Shakhtar Kadiivka	–
2 (1)	Kyiv Oblast	DO Kyiv, Dynamo Kyiv (klubnaya)	Dynamo Kyiv
2 (1)	Zakarpattia Oblast	Kolhospnyk Berehove, Iskra Mukachevo	Spartak Uzhhorod
2 (0)	Odesa Oblast	Spartak Odesa, Metalurh Odesa	–
2 (0)	Zaporizhia Oblast	Metalurh Zaporizhia, Lokomotyv Zaporizhia	–
2 (0)	Kirovohrad Oblast	Traktor Kirovohrad, Kolhospnyk Ulyanivka	–
2 (0)	(Soviet Union) Drohobych Oblast	Naftovyk Drohobych, Kolhospnyk Stryi	–
2 (0)	Lviv Oblast	DO Lviv, Kharchovyk Vynnyky	–
2 (0)	Poltava Oblast	Lokomotyv Poltava, Kolhospnyk Karlivka	–
2 (0)	Vinnytsia Oblast	Dynamo Vinnytsia, Kolhospnyk Mohyliv-Podilskyi	–
2 (0)	Ivano-Frankivsk Oblast	Spartak Stanislav, Stanislav	–
1 (0)	Mykolaiv Oblast	Chervonyi Prapor Mykolaiv	–
1 (0)	Zhytomyr Oblast	Spartak Zhytomyr	–
1 (0)	Kherson Oblast	Spartak Kherson	–
1 (0)	Chernivtsi Oblast	Dynamo Chernivtsi	–
1 (0)	Rivne Oblast	Lokomotyv Rine	–
1 (0)	Volyn Oblast	Dynamo Lutsk	–
1 (0)	Sumy Oblast	Mashynobudivnyk Sumy	–
1 (0)	Khmelnytskyi Oblast	Dynamo Proskuriv	–
1 (0)	Chernihiv Oblast	Spartak Chernihiv	–
1 (0)	(Soviet Union) Izmail Oblast	Vodnyk Izmail	–
0 (0)	Ternopil Oblast	–	–

== See also ==
- 1951 Cup of the Ukrainian SSR
