= FC Dinamo Kutaisi =

- Full name: Football Club Dinamo Kutaisi
- Nickname: FC Dinamo
- Founded: 1928
- Dissolved: 2010
- Ground: Givi Kiladze Stadium; Kutaisi, Georgia
- Capacity: 14,700
- League: N/A
| Home colours | Away colours |

FC Dinamo Kutaisi (Georgian: დინამო ქუთაისი) is a defunct Georgian football club based in Kutaisi, Georgia's third city. They played their home games at Givi Kiladze Stadium. During Georgian SSR Championships it was very famous and had many titles of that time. Being one of oldest clubs in the city, FC Dinamo Kutaisi was last taking part in Meore Liga, third level of Georgian League.

== Honours ==
- Georgian SSR Championship:
  - Champion: 1946, 1955
  - Runners-up: 1947, 1948, 1952, 1958
  - Third place: 1932, 1939, 1943, 1950, 1953, 1954, 1956
- Georgian SSR Cup:
  - Champion: 1953, 1955
  - Runners-up: 1944, 1945, 1946, 1951
