= 1949 Soviet Cup =

1949 Cup of USSR in Football
Кубок СССР

Tournament details
- Country: Soviet Union
- Dates: June 16 – September 20 (qualification stage); September 24 – November 4 (final stage)
- Teams: 120 (total); 54 (final stage)

Final positions
- Champions: Torpedo Moscow (1st title)
- Runners-up: Dinamo Moscow
- Semifinalists: CDKA Moscow; Spartak Moscow

The 1949 Soviet Cup was an association football cup competition of the Soviet Union.

== Participating teams ==
Enter in Final stage		Enter in Qualification stage	
Pervaya Grouppa 18/18 teams and Republican 18 teams		Vtoraya Grouppa 84/84 teams	
✓ Dinamo Moscow; ✓ CDKA Moscow; ✓ Spartak Moscow; ✓ Torpedo Moscow; ✓ Zenit Leningrad; ✓ Dinamo Tbilisi; ✓ Dinamo Kiev; ✓ VVS Moscow; ✓ Dinamo Leningrad; ✓ Krylia Sovetov Kuibyshev; ✓ Lokomotiv Moscow; ✓ Lokomotiv Kharkov; ✓ Torpedo Stalingrad; ✓ Neftianik Baku; ✓ Dynamo Minsk; ✓ Dinamo Yerevan; ✓ Daugava Riga; ✓ Shakhter Stalino	✓ Dinamo Petrozavodsk; ✓ Dinamo Tallinn; ✓ Krasny Metallurg Liyepaya; ✓ Inkaras Kaunas; ✓ Bobruisk; ✓ Kharkov; ✓ Lokomotiv Kishenev; ✓ Zavod imeni Dimitrova Tbilisi; ✓ DO Yerevan; ✓ KKF Baku; ✓ Dinamo Chimkent; ✓ Dinamo Tashkent; ✓ Burevestnik Frunze; ✓ Dinamo Stalinabad; ✓ Spartak Ashkhabad; ✓ Dinamo Novosibirsk; ✓ CDKA-3 Moscow; ✓ Zavod Progress Leningrad	Central Zone (14) ✓ Spartak Tbilisi; ✓ Dinamo Kutaisi; ✓ Spartak Vilnius; ✓ DO Tashkent; ✓ DO Tbilisi; ✓ DO Riga; ✓ Spartak Minsk; ✓ Spartak Yerevan; ✓ Dinamo Alma-Ata; ✓ DO Minsk; ✓ Dinamo Kishenev; ✓ Kalev Tallinn; ✓ Lokomotiv Ashkhabad; ✓ Zenit Frunze RSFSR II Zone (14) ✓ DO Sverdlovsk; ✓ DO Novosibirsk; ✓ Dzerzhinets Chelyabinsk; ✓ Krylya Sovetov Molotov; ✓ Avangard Sverdlovsk; ✓ Dinamo Chelyabinsk; ✓ Metallurg Stalinsk-Kuznetsk; ✓ Dinamo Sverdlovsk; ✓ Khimik Kemerovo; ✓ Dzerzhinets Nizhniy Tagil; ✓ Bolshevik Omsk; ✓ Tsvetmet Kamensk-Uralskiy; ✓ Metallurg Magnitogorsk; ✓ Shakhter Kemerovo RSFSR IV Zone (14) ✓ Zavod imeni Kalinina Kaliningrad; ✓ Stroitel Likino-Dulevo; ✓ Krasnoye Znamia Orekhovo-Zuyevo; ✓ Krasnoye Znamia Ivanovo; ✓ Khimik Orekhovo-Zuyevo; ✓ Dinamo Vladimir; ✓ Spartak Leningrad; ✓ Kovrov; ✓ Spartak Leningrad Oblast; ✓ Dzerzhinets Kolomna; ✓ Spartak Noginsk; ✓ Spartak Kalinin; ✓ Zenit Tula; ✓ Spartak Ivanovo	RSFSR I Zone (11) ✓ Dinamo Rostov-na-Donu; ✓ VMS Moscow; ✓ Dinamo Krasnodar; ✓ SKIF Moscow; ✓ Traktor Taganrog; ✓ VVS-2 Moscow; ✓ Metrostroi Moscow; ✓ Dinamo Voronezh; ✓ Sudostroitel Kaspiysk; ✓ Sudostrooitel Sevastopol; ✓ Pischevik Astrakhan RSFSR III Zone (13) ✓ Sudostoitel Leningrad; ✓ DO Leningrad; ✓ Metallurg Moscow; ✓ Torpedo Gorkiy; ✓ MVO Moscow; ✓ Izhevskiy Zavod Izhevsk; ✓ Zavod imeni Sverdlova Dzerzhinsk; ✓ Dinamo Moscow Oblast; ✓ Dinamo Kazan; ✓ Krylya Sovetov Gorkiy; ✓ Dinamo Saratov; ✓ Spartak Penza; ✓ Spartak Ryazan UkrSSR Zone (18) ✓ Pischevik Odessa; ✓ Spartak Lvov; ✓ DO Kiev; ✓ Spartak Uzhgorod; ✓ Bolshevik Mukachevo; ✓ Dzerzhinets Kharkov; ✓ Sudostroitel Nikolayev; ✓ Spartak Kherson; ✓ Metallurg Dnepropetrovsk; ✓ Spartak Kiev; ✓ Avangard Kramatorsk; ✓ Torpedo Kharkov; ✓ Dinamo Chernovtsy; ✓ Shakhter Kadiyevka; ✓ Trudovye Rezervy Voroshilovgrad; ✓ Lokomotiv Zaporozhye; ✓ DO Lvov; ✓ Dinamo Voroshilovgrad

Source: []

== Competition schedule ==
=== Preliminary stage ===
==== Group Center ====
===== Quarterfinals =====
DO Minsk                         3-0  DO Riga 
Kalev Tallinn                    0-2  SPARTAK Vilnius

===== Semifinals =====
[Sep 8] 
DINAMO Kishinev                  3-2  Spartak Vilnius 
DINAMO Kutaisi                   w/o  Spartak Yerevan 
DO Minsk                         3-1  Spartak Minsk 
Lokomotiv Ashkhabad              1-2  DINAMO Alma-Ata 
Spartak Tbilisi                  0-0  DO Tbilisi 
Zenit Frunze                     0-0  DO Tashkent

====== Semifinals replays ======
SPARTAK Tbilisi                  2-0  DO Tbilisi 
Zenit Frunze                     0-5  DO Tashkent

===== Finals =====
[Sep 13] 
DINAMO Kutaisi                   3-2  Spartak Tbilisi 
DO Minsk                         2-1  Dinamo Kishinev 
DO Tashkent                      3-2  Dinamo Alma-Ata             [aet]

==== Group 1 (Russian Federation) ====
===== Semifinals =====
DINAMO Rostov-na-Donu            w/o  VVS-2 Moskva 
DINAMO Voronezh                  2-1  Dinamo Krasnodar 
SKIF Moskva                      w/o  Sudostroitel Sevastopol 
SUDOSTROITEL Kaspiysk            3-1  MetroStroi Moskva 
TRAKTOR Taganrog                 4-2  Pishchevik Astrakhan

===== Finals =====
DINAMO Rostov-na-Donu            5-0  VMS Moskva 
DINAMO Voronezh                  2-1  Sudostroitel Kaspiysk 
SKIF Moskva                      2-3  TRAKTOR Taganrog

==== Group 2 (Russian Federation) ====
===== Quarterfinals =====
DO Novosibirsk                   8-1  Metallurg Stalinsk 
TSVETMET Kamensk-Uralskiy        3-2  Dinamo Sverdlovsk

===== Semifinals =====
Bolshevik Omsk                   0-3  DO Novosibirsk 
DINAMO Chelyabinsk               2-0  UralMash Sverdlovsk 
Dzerzhinets Nizhniy Tagil        1-2  DO Sverdlovsk 
KHIMIK Kemerovo                  3-0  Shakhtyor Kemerovo 
KRYLYA SOVETOV Molotov           2-0  TsvetMet Kamensk-Uralskiy 
Metallurg Magnitogorsk           0-2  DZERZHINETS Chelyabinsk

===== Finals =====
DINAMO Chelyabinsk               3-2  Dzerzhinets Chelyabinsk 
DO Sverdlovsk                    2-0  Khimik Kemerovo 
KRYLYA SOVETOV Molotov           3-0  DO Novosibirsk

==== Group 3 (Russian Federation) ====
===== Quarterfinals =====
METALLURG Moskva                 2-1  ZiS Dzerzhinsk

===== Semifinals =====
Dinamo Lyubertsy                 0-4  TORPEDO Gorkiy 
DO Leningrad                     2-1  Sudostroitel Leningrad 
METALLURG Moskva                 3-0  Izhevskiy Zavod Izhevsk 
MVO Moskva                       1-2  DINAMO Kazan               
Spartak Penza                    0-2  DINAMO Saratov              [aet] 
SPARTAK Ryazan                   3-2  Krylya Sovetov Gorkiy

===== Finals =====
DO Leningrad                     7-0  Spartak Ryazan 
METALLURG Moskva                 3-1  Dinamo Kazan 
Torpedo Gorkiy                   1-1  Dinamo Saratov

====== Finals replays ======
TORPEDO Gorkiy                   2-0  Dinamo Saratov

==== Group 4 (Russian Federation) ====
===== Quarterfinals =====
KRASNOYE ZNAMYA Ivanovo          2-0  Spartak Ivanovo

===== Semifinals =====
Dinamo Vladimir                  0-2  KOVROV 
DZERZHINETS Kolomna              1-0  Stroitel Likino-Dulyovo   
KRASNOYE ZNAMYA Orekhovo-Zuyevo  1-0  Carbolite Orekhovo-Zuyevo   [aet] 
SPARTAK Kalinin                  2-1  Spartak Leningrad Region    [aet] 
SPARTAK Noginsk                  3-1  Krasnoye Znamya Ivanovo

===== Finals =====
KOVROV                           2-1  Zenit Kaliningrad           [aet] 
KRASNOYE ZNAMYA Orekhovo-Zuyevo  3-1  Dzerzhinets Kolomna         [aet] 
SPARTAK Noginsk                  3-2  Spartak Kalinin

==== Group Ukraine ====
===== Quarterfinals =====
[Jun 16] 
DINAMO Voroshilovgrad            1-0  Dinamo Chernovtsy 
PISHCHEVIK Odessa                1-0  Dzerzhinets Kharkov 
SPARTAK Lvov                     3-2  Sudostroitel Nikolayev 
SPARTAK Uzhgorod                 1-0  Trudoviye Rezervy Voroshilovgrad 
[Jun 28] 
BOLSHEVIK Mukachevo              4-2  Spartak Kiev 
SPARTAK Kherson                  5-0  DO Lvov

===== Semifinals =====
AVANGARD Kramatorsk              w/o  Torpedo Kharkov 
DO Kiev                          3-1  Metallurg Dnepropetrovsk    [aet] 
Lokomotiv Zaporozhye             1-1  Spartak Uzhgorod 
PISHCHEVIK Odessa                2-0  Dinamo Voroshilovgrad 
SHAKHTYOR Kadiyevka              3-2  Bolshevik Mukachevo 
SPARTAK Kherson                  w/o  Spartak Lvov

====== Semifinals replays ======
LOKOMOTIV Zaporozhye             2-0  Spartak Uzhgorod

===== Finals =====
DO Kiev                          3-1  Shakhtyor Kadiyevka 
LOKOMOTIV Zaporozhye             w/o  Avangard Kramatorsk 
SPARTAK Kherson                  w/o  Pishchevik Odessa

=== Final stage ===
==== Preliminary round ====
[Sep 28] 
Dinamo Chimkent                  0-0  DO Tashkent         [in Alma-Ata] 
KRASNOYE ZNAMYA Orekhovo-Zuyevo  2-0  Dinamo Novosibirsk   
KRYLYA SOVETOV Molotov           2-1  Krasny Metallurg Liepaja   
ZiD Tbilisi                      1-2  DO Leningrad                [aet]

===== Preliminary round replays =====
[Sep 29, Alma-Ata] 
Dinamo Chimkent                  2-2  DO Tashkent 
[Sep 30, Alma-Ata] 
Dinamo Chimkent                  1-2  DO Tashkent

==== First round ====
[Sep 28] 
DO Bobruisk                      1-3  METALLURG Moskva 
  [I.Ruban 35 – Butenin 60, Zarkovskiy 61, Suetin 63] 
[Oct 5] 
Burevestnik Frunze               0-1  DINAMO Chelyabinsk 
CDKA-3 Moskva                    1-2  DINAMO Voronezh 
Dinamo Petrozavodsk              2-5  LOKOMOTIV Zaporozhye 
DINAMO Stalinabad                2-1  DO Kiev 
  [Y.Piskunyan, B.Gachegov - ?] 
Dinamo Tallinn                   1-4  DINAMO Rostov-na-Donu 
DINAMO Tashkent                  2-0  Traktor Taganrog 
DO Leningrad                     1-0  Lokomotiv Moskva 
DO Tashkent                      1-2  KRYLYA SOVETOV Kuibyshev 
DO Yerevan                       1-3  SPARTAK Kherson 
Inkaras Kaunas                   2-2  Dinamo Kutaisi 
KKF Baku                         1-3  SPARTAK Noginsk 
KRYLYA SOVETOV Molotov           3-1  Daugava Riga 
Lokomotiv Kishinev               2-7  KOVROV 
Spartak Ashkhabad                0-4  TORPEDO Gorkiy 
VVS Kharkov                      3-1  DO Minsk 
VVS Moskva                       1-1  Krasnoye Znamya Orekhovo-Zuyevo    
ZAVOD PROGRESS Leningrad         2-1  DO Sverdlovsk

===== First round replays =====
[Oct 6] 
INKARAS Kaunas                   4-2  Dinamo Kutaisi 
VVS Moskva                       0-2  KRASNOYE ZNAMYA Orekhovo-Zuyevo

==== Second round ====
[Oct 4] 
DINAMO Rostov-na-Donu            3-2  Dinamo Leningrad                 [in Moskva] 
  [Bogatello-2, Piskovatskiy – Pyotr Dementyev, Vasiliy Lotkov] 
[Oct 9] 
LOKOMOTIV Kharkov                2-1  Dinamo Chelyabinsk    
  [Mikhail Labunskiy, ? – I.Bugrov] 
Zavod Progress Leningrad         1-3  NEFTYANIK Baku 
  [? – Nikolai Rasskazov-2, Isai Abramashvili] 
[Oct 11] 
KOVROV                           1-0  Shakhtyor Stalino 
  [A.Kuznetsov] 
[Oct 12] 
Lokomotiv Zaporozhye             1-3  DINAMO Tbilisi           [aet] 
  [P.Ponomaryov – Viktor Panyukov, Andrei Zazroyev, Nikolai Todria] 
[Oct 16] 
DINAMO Stalinabad                1-0  Dinamo Yerevan 
  [Y.Yefremov 10] 
Dinamo Tashkent                  1-1  Torpedo Stalingrad 
  [? – Pyotr Kalmykov] 
Spartak Noginsk                  1-5  SPARTAK Moskva 
  [Kuznetsov – Nikita Simonyan-2, Nikolai Dementyev, Konstantin Ryazantsev, Alexei Paramonov] 
Torpedo Gorkiy                   1-1  Dinamo Kiev 
  [A.Suryaninov 53 – Fyodor Dashkov 78] 
VVS Kharkov                      1-3  TORPEDO Moskva 
  [Gusarov – Alexandr Ponomaryov-2, Nikolai Yefimov] 
[Oct 18] 
DINAMO Moskva                   10-0  Metallurg Moskva 
  [Vladimir Savdunin 10, 58, 72, Ivan Konov 34, 44, 61, Konstantin Beskov 39 pen, 41, Alexandr Malyavkin 42, Sergei Solovyov 85] 
Dinamo Voronezh                  0-7  CDKA Moskva 
DO Leningrad                     4-1  Krasnoye Znamya Orekhovo-Zuyevo  [in Moskva] 
  [Zhivopistsev-3, Zatyosov – Pryakhin]   
Inkaras Kaunas                   0-3  ZENIT Leningrad 
  [Friedrich Maryutin 30, Ivan Komarov 72, 80] 
Krylya Sovetov Molotov           0-2  KRYLYA SOVETOV Kuibyshev         [in Moskva] 
  [Boris Smyslov, Fyodor Novikov] 
Spartak Kherson                  0-0  Dinamo Minsk

===== Second round replays =====
[Oct 17] 
Dinamo Tashkent                  0-2  TORPEDO Stalingrad 
  [Viktor Shvedchenko, Serafim Arzamastsev] 
Torpedo Gorkiy                   0-3  DINAMO Kiev 
  [V.Tsvetkov (T) og, A.Shchanov, Fyodor Dashkov] 
[Oct 19] 
SPARTAK Kherson                  2-1  Dinamo Minsk 
  [V.Otorvin 67, Chokas 70 – Makarov 18]

==== Third round ====
[Oct 17] 
Dinamo Rostov-na-Donu            1-3  NEFTYANIK Baku 
  [Kuznetsov 84 – Yevgeniy Shagarov 6, Alekper Mamedov 30, ?] 
[Oct 19] 
DINAMO Tbilisi                   4-0  Kovrov 
  [Revaz Makharadze-2, Avtandil Gogoberidze, Nikolai Todria] 
[Oct 20] 
SPARTAK Moskva                   4-1  Dinamo Kiev 
  [Sergei Salnikov 12, 61, Nikita Simonyan 48, Viktor Terentyev 72 – Mikhail Mikhalina 22] 
[Oct 22] 
DINAMO Moskva                    3-0  Dinamo Stalinabad 
  [Konstantin Beskov 30, Vladimir Tsvetkov 39, D.Sokolov (DS) 79 og] 
SPARTAK Kherson                  1-0  DO Leningrad              [in Moskva] 
  [G.Goncharov 63] 
TORPEDO Moskva                   1-0  Krylya Sovetov Kuibyshev  [aet] 
  [Viktor Ponomaryov 117] 
[Oct 23] 
CDKA Moskva                      3-2  Lokomotiv Kharkov         [aet]
  [Vsevolod Bobrov 21, Valentin Nikolayev 39, Grigoriy Fedotov 110 – Ivan Boboshko, Georgiy Borzenko] 
Zenit Leningrad                  0-0  Torpedo Stalingrad        [in Moskva]

===== Third round replays =====
[Oct 24, Moskva] 
ZENIT Leningrad                  1-0  Torpedo Stalingrad 
  [Vyacheslav Solovyov 11]

==== Quarterfinals ====
[Oct 25] 
TORPEDO Moskva                   3-2  Neftyanik Baku 
  [Viktor Ponomaryov 55, Alexandr Ponomaryov ?, Vladimir Nechayev ? – Nikolai Rasskazov 44, Grigoriy Duganov (T) 47 og] 
[Oct 26] 
DINAMO Moskva                    3-1  Dinamo Tbilisi 
  [Konstantin Beskov 1, Vladimir Tsvetkov 67, Vladimir Savdunin 88 – Revaz Makharadze 69] 
SPARTAK Moskva                   7-1  Spartak Kherson 
  [Sergei Salnikov-4, Nikolai Dementyev-2, Nikita Simonyan – I.Zdor] 
[Oct 27] 
CDKA Moskva                      2-0  Zenit Leningrad 
  [Vsevolod Bobrov 3, Valentin Nikolayev 65]

==== Semifinals ====
[Oct 30] 
Dinamo Moskva                    2-2  Spartak Moskva 
  [Ivan Konov 27, Vladimir Ilyin 30 – Sergei Salnikov 20, 90] 
[Oct 31] 
TORPEDO Moskva                   2-1  CDKA Moskva 
  [Vladimir Nechayev, Alexandr Ponomaryov – Alexei Grinin]

===== Semifinals replays =====
[Oct 31] 
DINAMO Moskva                    2-1  Spartak Moskva 
  [Ivan Konov 78, Mikhail Semichastny 80 – Nikita Simonyan 12]

==== Final ====
4 November 1949

Torpedo Moscow	2 – 1	Dinamo Moscow
Nechayev 28'; Ponomaryov 83'	[ Report]	Ilyin 17'

Moscow
