= 1950 Soviet Cup =

1950 Cup of USSR in Football
Кубок СССР

Tournament details
- Country: Soviet Union
- Dates: September 10 – November 6
- Teams: 69

Final positions
- Champions: Spartak Moscow (5th title)
- Runners-up: Dinamo Moscow
- Semifinalists: CDKA Moscow; Krylia Sovetov Kuibyshev

The 1950 Soviet Cup was an association football cup competition of the Soviet Union.

== Participating teams ==
Enter in First round
Class A 19/19 teams	Class B 14/14 teams	Republican 36 teams	
✓ CDKA Moscow; ✓ Dinamo Moscow; ✓ Dinamo Tbilisi; ✓ VVS Moscow; ✓ Spartak Moscow; ✓ Zenit Leningrad; ✓ Krylia Sovetov Kuibyshev; ✓ Dinamo Leningrad; ✓ Spartak Tbilisi; ✓ Torpedo Moscow; ✓ Shakhter Stalino; ✓ Daugava Riga; ✓ Dinamo Kiev; ✓ Dinamo Yerevan; ✓ Lokomotiv Moscow; ✓ Lokomotiv Kharkov; ✓ Dynamo Minsk; ✓ Torpedo Stalingrad; ✓ Neftianik Baku	✓ VMS Moscow; ✓ Torpedo Gorkiy; ✓ Spartak Vilnius; ✓ Krasnoye Znamia Ivanovo; ✓ DO Tashkent; ✓ Burevestnik Kishenev; ✓ Dzerzhinets Chelyabinsk; ✓ Pischevik Odessa; ✓ Dinamo Alma-Ata; ✓ Lokomotiv Petrozavodsk; ✓ Trudovye Rezervy Frunze; ✓ Kalev Tallinn; ✓ Spartak Ashkhabad; ✓ Bolshevik Stalinabad	✓ DO Petrozavodsk (Karelia); ✓ Dinamo Petrozavodsk (Karelia); ✓ KBF Tallinn (Estonia); ✓ Dinamo Tallinn (Estonia); ✓ DO Riga (Latvia); ✓ Krasny Metallurg Liyepaya (Latvia); ✓ Elnyas Shaulyai (Lithuania); ✓ Inkaras Kaunas (Lithuania); ✓ DO Minsk (Belarus); ✓ Torpedo Minsk (Belarus); ✓ Spartak Uzhgorod (Ukraine); ✓ Metallurg Zaporozhye (Ukraine); ✓ Burevestnik Bendery (Moldova); ✓ Trud Kishenev (Moldova); ✓ DO Tbilisi (Georgia); ✓ Makharadze (Georgia); ✓ Krasnoye Znamia Leninakan (Armenia); ✓ Kirovokan (Armenia)	✓ Trudovye Rezervy Baku (Azerbaijan); ✓ Dinamo Stepanakert; ✓ Dinamo Jambul (Kazakhstan); ✓ Tsvetnye Metally Balkhash (Kazakhstan); ✓ Zavod Mashinostroyenia Tashkent (Uzbekistan); ✓ Dinamo Tashkent (Uzbekistan); ✓ Burevestnik Frunze (Kirgizia); ✓ Pischevik Chuy Oblast (Kirgizia); ✓ Dinamo Stalinabad (Tajikistan); ✓ Krasnaya Armiya Stalinabad (Tajikistan); ✓ DO Ashkhabad (Turkmenia); ✓ Trudovye Rezervy Chardjou (Turkmenia); ✓ DO Sverdlovsk (RSFSR); ✓ Traktor Taganrog (RSFSR); ✓ DO Novosibirsk (RSFSR); ✓ Zavod Mashinostroyenia Tambov (RSFSR); ✓ CDKA-2 Moscow; ✓ Dinamo-2 Leningrad

Source: []

== Competition schedule ==
=== Preliminary round ===
[Sep 29] 
Dinamo Stepanakert               0-2  PISHCHEVIK Odessa 
  [B.Chubinskiy-2] 
[Oct 1] 
DINAMO Yerevan                   3-0  Spartak Makharadze 
  [Ilya Mkrtchan, Amazasp Mkhoyan, ?] 
[Oct 15] 
Burevestnik Frunze               0-5  KRASNOYE ZNAMYA Ivanovo 
Dinamo Petrozavodsk              1-6  BUREVESTNIK Kishinev 
TRAKTOR Taganrog                 2-1  Spartak Tbilisi 
  [Sysoyev, Kutushov - ?]

=== First round ===
[Sep 30] 
Spartak Uzhgorod                 0-1  TORPEDO Stalingrad 
[Oct 1] 
Burevestnik Bendery              1-7  DINAMO Minsk 
Dinamo-2 Leningrad               1-7  VMS Moskva 
DO Novosibirsk                   5-0  Spartak Ashkhabad 
  [V.Zvonaryov-3, Alyoshin, Kuchanov] 
METALLURG Zaporozhye             5-0  Lokomotiv Petrozavodsk 
  [Y.Sytnik-2, P.Ponomaryov, O.Kiknadze, S.Vasilyev] 
TRUDOVIYE REZERVY Frunze        17-0  Pishchevik Chuy Region 
Zavod Mashinostroyeniya Tashkent 0-4  TRAKTOR Taganrog  
[Oct 4] 
Inkaras Kaunas                   1-3  DINAMO Kiev 
  [Skelovas 35 – Dezideriy Tovt 15, 81, Mikhail Koman 54 pen] 
[Oct 8] 
Dinamo Jambul                    1-2  NEFTYANIK Baku 
  [Shchogol – Alekper Mamedov, Valentin Khlystov] 
Krasnoye Znamya Ivanovo          1-2  DINAMO Yerevan 
  [A.Yeryomin 25 – Vladimir Bogdanovich 49, Ilya Mkrtchan 80] 
[Oct 10] 
Pishchevik Odessa                1-1  Burevestnik Kishinev 
  [B.Chubinskiy – Khodin] 
TRUDOVIYE REZERVY Charjou        w/o  Bolshevik Stalinabad

==== First round replays ====
[Oct 11] 
Pishchevik Odessa                0-2  BUREVESTNIK Kishinev

=== Second round ===
[Sep 28] 
Krasnoye Znamya Leninakan        0-3  LOKOMOTIV Moskva 
[Oct 1] 
Kirovakan                        0-1  DZERZHINETS Chelyabinsk 
[Oct 2] 
DINAMO Minsk                     w/o  TsvetMet Balkhash 
Dinamo Stalinabad                0-4  BUREVESTNIK Kishinev 
DO Petrozavodsk                  1-2  KALEV Tallinn 
DO Sverdlovsk                    5-1  Spartak Vilnius 
  [B.Ivanov, I.Dominskiy, F.Koptelov, B.Vorobyov, V.Listochkin - ?] 
DO Tbilisi                       5-3  CDKA-2 Moskva             [aet] 
Krasnaya Armiya Stalinabad       0-1  TORPEDO Gorkiy 
  [Jesus Varela] 
Trudoviye Rezervy Baku           3-3  Dinamo Leningrad 
Zavod Mashinostroyeniya Tambov   1-7  LOKOMOTIV Kharkov 
  [? – Georgiy Borzenko-3, Vitaliy Zub-2, Pyotr Ponomarenko, Sergei Chizhov] 
[Oct 3] 
DINAMO Tallinn                   5-3  Dinamo Alma-Ata 
  [A.Sepp-2, U.Pillu-2, Vakemets – A.Mezhov, ?, ?] 
DO Ashkhabad                     1-5  KRYLYA SOVETOV Kuibyshev 
DO Riga                          1-2  DINAMO Tbilisi            [aet] 
  [Mikhail Kuzmin 63 – Avtandil Gogoberidze 83 pen, Georgiy Antadze 98] 
Krasny Metallurg Liepaja         0-3  TORPEDO Moskva 
  [Yuriy Chaiko, Antonin Sochnev, Alexandr Ponomaryov] 
Torpedo Minsk                    2-3  DAUGAVA Riga 
  [? – Yuriy Shebilov ?, Maks Levitanus ?, 75 pen] 
Trud Kishinev                    0-10 SHAKHTYOR Stalino 
  [Viktor Fomin-3, Leonid Savinov-2, N.Vardimiadi, Viktor Kolesnikov, Dmitriy Ivanov, ?, ?] 
[Oct 4] 
DO Minsk                        10-1  Trudoviye Rezervy Charjou 
Elnias Siauliai                  2-3  DO Tashkent 
[Oct 5] 
Dinamo Tashkent                  0-8  VVS Moskva 
  [Sergei Korshunov-2, Alexandr Obotov-2, Spartak Jejelava-2, Viktor Fyodorov, Nikolai Morozov] 
[Oct 8] 
Metallurg Zaporozhye             2-3  TORPEDO Stalingrad 
  [G.Sushkov 15, P.Ponomaryov 19 – Klimov 42, ?, Yuriy Belousov ?] 
[Oct 9] 
DO Novosibirsk                   4-1  Trudoviye Rezervy Frunze 
  [Zvonaryov-2, Bystrov, Kuchanov – Zhigalkin] 
VMS Moskva                       3-1  Neftyanik Baku 
  [Nikolai Shkatulov-2, Mikhail Didevich - ?] 
[Oct 10] 
KBF Tallinn                      2-4  DINAMO Kiev 
  [A.Goryachev 44, Y.Yefimenko 90 – Georgiy Ponomaryov 2, 62, Dezideriy Tovt 64, Mikhail Koman 80] 
[Oct 15] 
DINAMO Yerevan                   5-2  Traktor Taganrog          [aet] 
  [Ilya Mkrtchan 22, 75, ?, Viktor Merkulov 96, Vladimir Bogdanovich 99 – Sysoyev 19, Kutushov 35]

==== Second round replays ====
[Oct 3] 
Trudoviye Rezervy Baku           1-4  DINAMO Leningrad

=== Third round ===
[Oct 8] 
Daugava Riga                     0-1  LOKOMOTIV Moskva 
  [Yevgeniy Bologov 86 pen] 
[Oct 10] 
DINAMO Tbilisi                   3-1  Torpedo Moskva 
  [Mikhail Jojua 4, Nikolai Todria 32, Boris Paichadze 75 – Viktor Ponomaryov 90 pen] 
DO Sverdlovsk                    1-0  Dinamo Leningrad 
  [Zykin] 
Dzerzhinets Chelyabinsk          0-2  VVS Moskva 
  [Viktor Shuvalov, Sergei Korshunov] 
KRYLYA SOVETOV Kuibyshev         1-0  DO Tbilisi 
  [Alexandr Gulevskiy 36] 
SHAKHTYOR Stalino                2-1  Torpedo Gorkiy 
  [Viktor Kolesnikov 68, Leonid Savinov 87 – Alexandr Denisov 53] 
[Oct 11] 
KALEV Tallinn                    3-0  Dinamo Tallinn 
Lokomotiv Kharkov                0-2  DO Tashkent 
  [S.Yazvetskiy 14, Khuduridi 37] 
[Oct 15] 
TORPEDO Stalingrad               3-1  DO Minsk 
[Oct 20] 
Dinamo Kiev                      2-3  DINAMO Yerevan 
  [Dezideriy Tovt 10, Georgiy Ponomaryov 15 – Vladimir Bogdanovich 42, 65, Ilya Mkrtchan 84] 
DINAMO Minsk                     2-1  DO Novosibirsk 
  [? – Zvonaryov 60 pen] 
[Oct 22] 
VMS Moskva                       2-3  BUREVESTNIK Kishinev 
  [Yevgeniy Gorbunov, P.Petrov pen – V.Khodin-2, ?]

=== Fourth round ===
[Oct 15] 
Krylya Sovetov Kuibyshev         0-0  DO Tashkent 
[Oct 16] 
KALEV Tallinn                    2-1  DO Sverdlovsk 
  [Juba, Kilk – D.Ivanov] 
LOKOMOTIV Moskva                 3-1  Shakhtyor Stalino 
  [Yevgeniy Bologov 13, 86, Vasiliy Panfilov 66 – Leonid Savinov 63] 
[Oct 17] 
VVS Moskva                       2-1  Dinamo Tbilisi 
  [Alexei Anisimov 44, 68 – Nikolai Todria 59] 
[Oct 23] 
CDKA Moskva                      2-1  Torpedo Stalingrad 
  [Vyacheslav Solovyov 37, Valentin Nikolayev 88 – Yuriy Nyrkov (C) 39 og] 
[Oct 24] 
DINAMO Moskva                    7-0  Dinamo Yerevan 
  [Sergei Solovyov 13, 56, 66, Konstantin Beskov 43, 50 pen, 53, Vasiliy Trofimov 82] 
ZENIT Leningrad                  3-1  Dinamo Minsk              [aet]  
  [Alexandr Ivanov 21, Lazar Kravets 95, Friedrich Maryutin ? – Nikolai Barmashov 46] 
[Oct 25] 
SPARTAK Moskva                   7-0  Burevestnik Kishinev 
  [Nikolai Dementyev 5, 30, Viktor Terentyev 10, 25, Nikita Simonyan 15, 70, Alexei Paramonov 20]

==== Fourth round replays ====
[Oct 16] 
Krylya Sovetov Kuibyshev         0-0  DO Tashkent 
[Oct 18] 
KRYLYA SOVETOV Kuibyshev         2-0  DO Tashkent 
  [Alexandr Gulevskiy 36, 37]

=== Quarterfinals ===
[Oct 23] 
VVS Moskva                       0-1  KRYLYA SOVETOV Kuibyshev         
  [Alexandr Gulevskiy] 
[Oct 26] 
CDKA Moskva                      2-0  Kalev Tallinn 
  [Valentin Nikolayev 17, ?] 
[Oct 27] 
DINAMO Moskva                    3-2  Lokomotiv Moskva          [aet] 
  [Sergei Solovyov 71, Ivan Konov 97, Vladimir Savdunin 106 – Boris Lagutin 10, Boris Pirogov 118] 
[Oct 28] 
SPARTAK Moskva                   3-1  Zenit Leningrad 
  [Alexandr Rystsov 15, Alexei Paramonov 50, Nikita Simonyan 57 – Lazar Kravets 34]

=== Semifinals ===
[Oct 31] 
DINAMO Moskva                    7-0  Krylya Sovetov Kuibyshev 
  [Sergei Salnikov 33, Sergei Solovyov 46, 70, 84, Vasiliy Trofimov 55, Konstantin Beskov 62, 74] 
[Nov 1] 
SPARTAK Moskva                   4-0  CDKA Moskva 
  [Nikolai Dementyev 53 pen, Nikita Simonyan 82, 89, Nikolai Parshin 85]

=== Final ===
6 November 1950

Spartak Moscow	3 – 0	Dinamo Moscow
Timakov 35'; Terentyev 40'; Dementyev 65'	[ Report]

Moscow
