= Vyacheslav Solovyov (footballer) =

Soviet footballer

Personal information
- Full name: Vyacheslav Dmitriyevich Solovyov
- Date of birth: 18 January 1925
- Place of birth: Veshnyaki, Russian SFSR, Soviet Union
- Date of death: 7 September 1996 (aged 71)
- Place of death: Moscow, Russia
- Height: 1.73 m (5 ft 8 in)
- Positions: Forward; midfielder

Senior career*
| Years | Team | Apps | (Gls) |
| 1946–1952 | CDSA Moscow | 127 | (38) |
| 1952–1953 | MVO Moscow | 6 | (0) |
| 1953–1954 | FC Torpedo Moscow | 16 | (1) |

Managerial career
- 1954–1957: FC Krylia Sovetov Kuybyshev
- 1959–1962: Dynamo Kyiv
- 1963–1964: PFC CSKA Moscow
- 1965–1966: FC Dynamo Moscow
- 1967–1968: FC Dinamo Tbilisi
- 1969–1971: FC Dynamo Leningrad (director)
- 1972–1975: FC Pakhtakor Tashkent
- 1980–1983: FC Dynamo Moscow
- 1985: Neftchi Baku PFC
- 1988: Tavriya Simferopol
- 1989–1990: FC Pamir Dushanbe (assistant)
- 1991: FC Alga Bishkek
- * Club domestic league appearances and goals

Vyacheslav Dmitriyevich Solovyov (Russian: Вячеслав Дмитриевич Соловьёв; born 18 January 1925; died 7 September 1996) was a Soviet football player and coach. He was also a veteran of World War II and received such decorations like a medal "For the Defence of Moscow" and a medal "For Courage".

Solovyov was born in a populated place near the Veshnyaki train station, Moskovsky Uyezd.

== Club career ==
As a player, he made his professional debut in the Soviet Top League in 1946 for CDKA Moscow. However his playing career started before the Nazi invasion of the Soviet Union.

== Coaching career ==
It was with Solovyov, Dynamo Kyiv won its first league's title back in 1961.

In 1987 as a manager of SC Tavriya Simferopol, Solovyov reached the 1986–87 Soviet Cup semifinals and gained promotion to the 1988 Soviet First League. His players were honored with titles of masters of sports of the Soviet Union: Borys Biloshapka, Serhiy Shevchenko, Viktor Halustov, Ihor Leonov, Semen Osynovskyi, Ihor Lyalin, Sergei Dementyev, Viktor Budnyk, Oleksandr Isayev.

== Honours ==
=== As a player ===
- Soviet Top League champion: 1946, 1947, 1948, 1950, 1951.
- Soviet Top League runner-up: 1949.
- Soviet Top League bronze: 1953.
- Soviet Cup winner: 1948, 1951.

=== As a coach ===
- Soviet Top League champion: 1961.
