= 1950 Soviet Top League =

13th season of top-tier football league in Soviet Union

Soviet Top League
- Season: 1950

Following are the results of the 1950 Soviet Top League football championship. Nineteen teams took part in the competition, with CDKA Moscow winning the championship.

== League standings ==
Pos	Team	Pld	W	D	L	GF	GA	GD	Pts	Qualification
1	(Russian Soviet Federative Socialist Republic) CDKA Moscow (C)	36	20	13	3	91	31	+60	53	League champions
2	(Russian Soviet Federative Socialist Republic) Dynamo Moscow	36	22	6	8	88	36	+52	50	
3	(Georgian Soviet Socialist Republic) Dynamo Tbilisi	36	20	7	9	78	50	+28	47	
4	(Russian Soviet Federative Socialist Republic) VVS Moscow	36	20	5	11	78	52	+26	45	
5	(Russian Soviet Federative Socialist Republic) Spartak Moscow	36	17	10	9	77	40	+37	44	
6	(Russian Soviet Federative Socialist Republic) Zenit Leningrad	36	19	5	12	70	59	+11	43	
7	(Russian Soviet Federative Socialist Republic) Krylia Sovetov Kuybyshev	36	15	10	11	44	44	0	40	
8	(Russian Soviet Federative Socialist Republic) Dynamo Leningrad	36	14	10	12	63	50	+13	38	
9	(Georgian Soviet Socialist Republic) Spartak Tbilisi	36	14	9	13	50	53	−3	37	
10	(Russian Soviet Federative Socialist Republic) Torpedo Moscow	36	13	10	13	57	60	−3	36	
11	(Ukrainian Soviet Socialist Republic) Shakhtyor Stalino	36	13	7	16	49	63	−14	33	
12	(Latvian Soviet Socialist Republic) Daugava Riga	36	12	8	16	37	45	−8	32	
13	(Ukrainian Soviet Socialist Republic) Dynamo Kiev	36	10	11	15	39	53	−14	31	
14	(Armenian Soviet Socialist Republic) Dynamo Yerevan (R)	36	10	11	15	39	57	−18	31	Relegation to Class B
15	(Russian Soviet Federative Socialist Republic) Lokomotiv Moscow (R)	36	11	8	17	41	73	−32	30	Relegation to Class B
16	(Ukrainian Soviet Socialist Republic) Lokomotiv Kharkov (R)	36	12	4	20	33	52	−19	28	Relegation to Class B
17	(Byelorussian Soviet Socialist Republic) Dinamo Minsk (R)	36	9	5	22	44	73	−29	23	Relegation to Class B
18	(Russian Soviet Federative Socialist Republic) Torpedo Stalingrad (R)	36	8	6	22	26	77	−51	22	Relegation to Class B
19	(Azerbaijan Soviet Socialist Republic) Neftyanik Baku (R)	36	6	9	21	37	73	−36	21	Relegation to Class B

Source: rsssf.com
(C) Champions; (R) Relegated

== Results ==
Home \ Away	CDK	DAU	DYK	DLE	DMN	DYN	DTB	DYE	KRY	LKH	LOK	NEF	SHA	SPA	STB	TOR	TST	VVS	ZEN
CDKA Moscow		2–0	5–0	2–0	2–0	2–0	3–1	4–0	4–2	4–0	4–0	3–1	7–0	0–0	4–1	2–2	4–1	0–1	0–0
Daugava Riga	1–0		0–0	1–0	0–2	2–0	1–1	1–2	1–2	3–0	0–1	5–0	1–0	2–0	1–1	1–1	1–1	1–0	2–1
Dynamo Kiev	0–2	1–0		2–2	1–1	0–2	1–2	3–0	1–0	0–1	0–1	2–2	4–1	0–0	1–1	1–1	4–0	1–3	1–2
Dynamo Leningrad	1–1	1–0	5–0		5–0	2–0	3–3	3–0	1–2	4–1	0–1	3–3	1–2	2–2	0–0	1–2	2–0	2–5	4–0
Dinamo Minsk	0–1	2–4	1–1	0–2		1–5	0–1	0–1	1–2	4–3	3–1	3–2	2–3	3–3	3–0	3–0	3–1	2–4	1–3
Dynamo Moscow	2–0	3–0	3–1	0–2	3–0		5–4	5–0	4–0	3–1	1–1	6–0	0–1	1–1	5–1	6–2	1–0	6–0	3–4
Dynamo Tbilisi	2–2	5–2	2–0	3–1	2–1	1–3		0–0	3–1	0–0	5–1	2–0	3–1	1–0	0–1	2–1	7–0	1–5	1–3
Dynamo Yerevan	1–1	1–0	0–0	0–2	2–0	1–1	0–1		1–1	1–2	3–1	2–2	4–1	2–1	1–1	1–1	2–0	1–2	2–4
Krylia Sovetov Kuybyshev	0–0	3–0	0–0	2–2	2–0	2–2	1–0	2–1		3–1	0–0	1–0	0–0	0–0	1–0	1–2	0–0	1–0	2–3
Lokomotiv Kharkov	1–1	1–0	0–1	0–2	1–2	0–2	0–3	2–0	1–1		0–1	2–0	1–0	0–2	0–1	2–2	3–0	2–1	1–0
Lokomotiv Moscow	3–5	2–2	0–2	0–5	2–0	1–1	1–2	1–1	0–2	0–1		2–1	1–3	1–4	0–1	3–2	2–1	3–6	2–0
Neftyanik Baku	3–3	1–0	0–0	3–0	0–1	0–0	1–3	1–1	1–2	0–2	0–0		1–0	3–2	2–0	0–2	0–1	0–2	1–4
Shakhtyor Stalino	0–7	1–0	6–0	0–1	3–0	0–1	2–2	2–0	0–1	2–1	1–1	4–2		1–1	0–2	1–1	3–1	1–2	5–0
Spartak Moscow	1–2	5–0	1–4	6–0	2–1	1–3	1–1	4–0	3–0	3–1	6–1	4–0	5–0		4–1	2–2	2–0	2–0	0–0
Spartak Tbilisi	2–2	2–2	2–1	4–0	2–1	1–0	1–3	3–1	4–1	1–0	1–2	3–3	0–0	2–1		2–1	0–1	1–1	1–4
Torpedo Moscow	1–1	0–0	0–3	2–1	2–0	1–0	4–1	3–1	2–1	1–0	1–2	2–0	4–0	2–4	4–3		0–2	1–2	0–4
Torpedo Stalingrad	1–1	0–2	2–3	1–1	0–0	0–5	1–4	0–2	0–4	1–0	2–2	0–3	1–3	2–0	1–0	2–1		2–6	0–3
VVS Moscow	2–2	0–1	2–0	1–1	2–2	1–2	0–4	1–3	2–1	1–2	4–1	4–0	3–0	1–2	1–0	4–4	3–0		2–0
Zenit Leningrad	1–8	3–0	3–0	1–1	5–1	2–4	3–2	1–1	4–0	2–0	3–0	2–1	2–2	1–2	1–4	1–0	0–1	0–4	

Legend: Blue = home team win; Yellow = draw; Red = away team win.

== Top scorers ==
34 goals

- Nikita Simonyan (Spartak Moscow)

25 goals

- Avtandil Gogoberidze (Dinamo Tbilisi)

23 goals

- Boris Chuchelov (Dynamo Leningrad)

22 goals

- Konstantin Beskov (Dynamo Moscow)
- Anatoli Korotkov (Zenit Leningrad)

21 goals

- Boris Koverznev (CDKA Moscow)

19 goals

- Vladimir Dyomin (CDKA Moscow)

18 goals

- Vyacheslav Solovyov (CDKA Moscow)

17 goals

- Aleksandr Gulevsky (Krylia Sovetov Kuybyshev)

16 goals

- Viktor Shuvalov (VVS Moscow)
- Vasili Trofimov (Dynamo Moscow)
