= FC Dynamo Voronezh =

Russian football club

- Full name: Football Club Dynamo Voronezh
- Founded: 1925
- Dissolved: 2010
- Ground: Trade Unions Central Stadium
- League: Amateur Football League, Zone Chernozemye
- 2010: 12th

FC Dynamo Voronezh (Russian: «Динамо» (Воронеж)) is a Russian football team from Voronezh. It played professionally in 1946, 1949 and 2006–2008. In 1949, they played in the second-highest Soviet First League, taking 8th place in Zone 1. As of 2009, it plays in the Amateur Football League.

== Team name history ==
- 1925–2007: FC Dynamo Voronezh
- 2008: FC Dynamo-Voronezh Voronezh
- 2009–present: FC Dynamo Voronezh
