= 1948 Football Championship of the Ukrainian SSR =

Football Championship of UkrSSR
- Season: 1948
- Champions: FC Torpedo Odessa
- Promoted: Torpedo Kharkiv (admitted Dinamo Chernivtsi)

The 1948 Football Championship of UkrSSR were part of the 1948 Soviet republican football competitions in the Soviet Ukraine.

== Qualification group stage ==
=== Group 1 ===
| Pos | Team |
|---|---|
| 1 | m/u 25750 Kyiv |
| 2 | Mashynobudivnyk Smila |
| 3 | DO Cherkasy |
| 4 | Trud Vasylkiv |
| 5 | Trudovi Rezervy Kyiv |
| 6 | Mashynobudivnyk Fastiv |
| 7 | m/u Bila Tserkva |
| 8 | Dynamo Kyiv |

=== Group 2 ===
| Pos | Team |
|---|---|
| 1 | Dynamo Sumy |
| 2 | VPS Poltava |
| 3 | Spartak Poltava |
| 4 | Lokomotyv Konotop |
| 5 | Khimik Shostka |
| 6 | Dzerzhynets Kremenchuk |
| 7 | Mashynobudivnyk Sumy |
| 8 | Dynamo Chernihiv |

=== Group 3 ===
| Pos | Team |
|---|---|
| 1 | Metalurh Dniprodzerzhynsk |
| 2 | Lokomotyv Dnipropetrovsk |
| 3 | Mashynobudivnyk Melitopol |
| 4 | Lokomotyv Zaporizhia |
| 5 | Dynamo Dnipropetrovsk |
| 6 | Torpedo Osypenenko |
| 7 | Sudnobudivnyk Velykyi Tokmak |
| 8 | Stal Zaporizhia |
| 9 | Spartak Kryvyi Rih |
| 10 | Stal Kryvyi Rih |
| 11 | Burevisnyk Zaporizhia |

=== Group 4 ===
| Pos | Team |
|---|---|
| 1 | Torpedo Kharkiv |
| 2 | Stal Voroshylovsk |
| 3 | Dzerzhynets Voroshylovhrad |
| 4 | Shakhtar Krasnyi Luch |
| 5 | Khimik Rubizhne |

Following clubs were supposed to play, but withdrew before start of the season Lokomotyv Izyum, Kharchovyk Kupiansk, Dynamo Kharkiv, Spartak Kharkiv, Kadiivka.

=== Group 5 ===
| Pos | Team |
|---|---|
| 1 | Stal Kostyantynivka |
| 2 | Shakhtar Smolyanka |
| 3 | Metalurh Mariupol |
| 4 | Shakhtar Rutchenkove |
| 5 | Stal Makiivka |
| 6 | Shakhtar Horlivka |
| 7 | Shakhtar Chystyakove |
| 8 | Lokomotyv Yasynuvata |
| 9 | Avanhard Kramatorsk [klubnaya] |
| 10 | Shakhtar Druzhkivka |
| 11 | Lokomotyv Debaltseve |
| 12 | Stal Yenakieve |
| 13 | Azovstal Mariupol |
| 14 | Shakhtar Yenakieve |
| 15 | Sloviansk |
| 16 | Stal Horlivka |

=== Group 6 ===
| Pos | Team |
|---|---|
| 1 | Torpedo Odesa |
| 2 | Spartak Izmail |
| 3 | Lokomotyv Kotovsk |
| 4 | Bilshovyk Odesa |

=== Group 7 ===
| Pos | Team |
|---|---|
| 1 | Dynamo Voznesensk |
| 2 | Sudnobudivnyk-2 Mykolaiv |
| 3 | Traktor Kirovohrad |
| 4 | Lokomotyv Znamianka |
| 5 | Budivelnyk Mykolaiv |
| 6 | Mashynobudivnyk Mykolaiv |
| 7 | Avanhard Kherson |
| 8 | Shakhtar Oleksandria |

=== Group 8 ===
| Pos | Team |
|---|---|
| 1 | Dynamo Vinnytsia |
| 2 | Dynamo Proskuriv |
| 3 | Dynamo Zhytomyr |
| 4 | Spartak Zhytomyr |
| 5 | DO Vinnytsia |
| 6 | DO Zhytomyr |
| 7 | Mashynobudivnyk Berdychiv |
| 8 | m/u Berdychiv |
| 9 | Dynamo Kamianets-Podilskyi |
| 10 | Lokomotyv Shepetivka |

=== Group 9 ===
| Pos | Team |
|---|---|
| 1 | Lokomotyv Rivne |
| 2 | Dynamo Lutsk |
| 3 | Bilshovyk Zolochiv |
| 4 | DO Volodymyr-Volynskyi |
| 5 | Bilshovyk Kremenets |
| 6 | Lokomotyv Ternopil |

=== Group 10 ===
| Pos | Team |
|---|---|
| 1 | Dynamo Uzhhorod |
| 2 | Bilshovyk Solotvyne |
| 3 | DO Stryi |
| 4 | Dynamo Stanislav |
| 5 | Naftovyk Boryslav |
| 6 | Bilshovyk Sambir |
| 7 | Medyk Stanislav |
| 8 | Dynamo Chernivtsi |
| 9 | Spartak Drohobych |

== Final stage ==
=== Group 1 ===
| Pos | Team |
|---|---|
| 1 | FC Torpedo Odessa |
| 2 | FC Dynamo Uzhhorod |
| 3 | FC Dynamo Vinnytsia |
| 4 | FC Lokomotyv Rivno |
| 5 | FC Dynamo Voznesensk |

=== Group 2 ===
| Pos | Team |
|---|---|
| 1 | FC Stal Kostiantynivka |
| 2 | m/u 25750 Kyiv |
| 3 | FC Stal Dniprodzerzhynsk |
| 4 | FC Dynamo Sumy |
| 5 | FC Torpedo Kharkiv |

== Championship final ==
- FC Stal Kostiantynivka – FC Torpedo Odessa 0:2

== Ukrainian clubs at the All-Union level ==
- First Group (1): Dynamo Kyiv
- Second Group (15): Lokomotyv Kharkiv, Kharchovyk Odesa, Shakhtar Stalino, Stal Dnipropetrovsk, Sudnobudivnyk Mykolaiv, DO Kyiv, Spartak Lviv, Spartak Kherson, Spartak Uzhhorod, Dzerzhynets Kharkiv, Dynamo Voroshylovhrad, Lokomotyv Zaporizhia, Avanhard Kramatorsk, Shakhtar Kadiivka, Bilshovyk Mukachevo

== Number of teams by region ==
| Number | Region | Team(s) | |
| Number | Region | Ukrainian SSR | All-Union |
|---|---|---|---|
| 16 (2) | Donetsk Oblast | Stal Kostiantynivka, Shakhtar Smolianka, Metalurh Mariupol, Shakhtar Rutchenkove, Stal Makiivka, Shakhtar Horlivka, Shakhtar Chystiankove, Lokomotyv Yasynuvata, Avanhard Kramatorsk (klubnaya), Shakhtar Druzhkivka, Lokomotyv Debaltseve, Stal Yenakieve, Azovstal Mariupol, Shakhtar Yenakieve, Sloviansk, Stal Horlivka | Stakhanovets Stalino, Avanhard Kramatorsk |
| 8 (2) | Kyiv Oblast | m/u 25750 Kyiv, Mashynobudivnyk Smila, DO Cherkasy, Trud Vasylkiv, Trudovi Rezervy Kyiv, Mashynobudivnyk Fastiv, m/u Bila Tserkva, Dynamo Kyiv (klubnaya) | Dynamo Kyiv, ODO Kyiv |
| 5 (2) | Kharkiv Oblast | Torpedo Kharkiv, Lokomotyv Izyum, Kharchovyk Kupiansk, Dynamo Kharkiv, Spartak Kharkiv | Dzerzhynets Kharkiv, Lokomotyv Kharkiv |
| 5 (2) | Luhansk Oblast | Stal Voroshylovsk, Dzerzhynets Voroshylovhrad, Shakhtar Krasnyi Luch, Khimik Rubizhne, Kadiivka | Dynamo Voroshylovhrad, Shakhtar Kadiivka |
| 2 (2) | Zakarpattia Oblast | Dynamo Uzhhorod, Bilshovyk Solotvyne | Spartak Uzhhorod, Bilshovyk Mukachevo |
| 6 (1) | Zaporizhia Oblast | Mashynobudivnyk Melitopol, Lokomotyv Zaporizhia (klubnaya), Torpedo Osypenko, Sudnobudivnyk Velykyi Tokmak, Stal Zaporizhia, Burevisnyk Zaporizhia | Lokomotyv Zaporizhia |
| 5 (1) | Dnipropetrovsk Oblast | Metalurh Dniprodzerzhynsk, Lokomotyv Dnipropetrovsk, Dynamo Dnipropetrovsk, Spartak Kryivyi Rih, Stal Kryvyi Rih | Stal Dnipropetrovsk |
| 4 (1) | Mykolaiv Oblast | Dynamo Voznesensk, Sudnobudivnyk-2 Mykolaiv, Budivelnyk Mykolaiv, Mashynobudivnyk Mykolaiv | Sudnobudivnyk Mykolaiv |
| 3 (1) | Odesa Oblast | Torpedo Odesa, Lokomotyv Kotovsk, Bilshovyk Odesa | Kharchovyk Odesa |
| 1 (1) | Lviv Oblast | Bilshovyk Zolochiv | Spartak Lviv |
| 1 (1) | Kherson Oblast | Avanhard Kherson | Spartak Kherson |
| 5 (0) | Zhytomyr Oblast | Dynamo Zhytomyr, Spartak Zhytomyr, DO Zhytomyr, Mashynobudivnyk Berdychiv, m/u Berdychiv | – |
| 4 (0) | Sumy Oblast | Dynamo Sumy, Lokomotyv Konotop, Khimik Shostka, Mashynobudivnyk Sumy | – |
| 4 (0) | (Soviet Union) Drohobych Oblast | DO Stryi, Naftovyk Boryslav, Bilshovyk Sambir, Spartak Drohobych | – |
| 3 (0) | Poltava Oblast | VPS Poltava, Spartak Poltava, Dzerzhynets Kremenchuk | – |
| 3 (0) | Khmelnytskyi Oblast | Dynamo Proskuriv, Dynamo Kamianets-Podilskyi, Lokomotyv Shepetivka | – |
| 3 (0) | Kirovohrad Oblast | Traktor Kirovohrad, Lokomotyv Znamianka, Shakhtar Oleksandriya | – |
| 2 (0) | Ternopil Oblast | Bilshovyk Kremenets, Lokomotyv Ternopil | – |
| 2 (0) | Vinnytsia Oblast | Dynamo Vinnytsia, DO Vinnytsia | – |
| 2 (0) | Ivano-Frankivsk Oblast | Dynamo Stanislav, Medyk Stanislav | – |
| 2 (0) | Volyn Oblast | Dynamo Lutsk, DO Volodymyr-Volynskyi | – |
| 1 (0) | Chernihiv Oblast | Dynamo Chernihiv | – |
| 1 (0) | Rivne Oblast | Lokomotyv Rine | – |
| 1 (0) | Chernivtsi Oblast | Dynamo Chernivtsi | – |
| 1 (0) | (Soviet Union) Izmail Oblast | Spartak Izmail | – |
