= 1950 Football Championship of the Ukrainian SSR =

Football Championship of UkrSSR
- Season: 1950
- Champions: Spartak Uzhhorod
- Promoted: Spartak Uzhhorod

The 1950 Football Championship of UkrSSR were part of the 1950 Soviet republican football competitions in the Soviet Ukraine.

== Qualification group stage ==
=== Group 1 ===
Pos	Team	Pld	W	D	L	GF	GA	GD	Pts
1	DO Kyiv	18	14	3	1	50	16	+34	31
2	Traktor Kirovohrad	18	11	3	4	29	20	+9	25
3	Dzerzhynskyi Raion Kharkiv	18	10	4	4	–	–	—	24
4	Torpedo Dnipropetrovsk	18	10	2	6	–	–	—	22
5	Lokomotyv Poltava	18	8	3	7	31	26	+5	19
6	Dynamo Vinnytsia	18	6	6	6	33	26	+7	18
7	Dynamo Kyiv	18	8	2	8	25	24	+1	18
8	Lokomotyv Odesa	18	5	3	10	23	31	−8	13
9	Dynamo Zhytomyr	18	4	2	12	25	51	−26	10
10	Lokomotyv Dnipropetrovsk	18	0	0	18	8	55	−47	0

=== Group 2 ===
Pos	Team	Pld	W	D	L	GF	GA	GD	Pts
1	Metalurh Zaporizhia	17	13	2	2	49	14	+35	28
2	Metalurh Dniprodzerzhynsk	17	13	1	3	40	24	+16	27
3	Dynamo Mykolaiv	17	11	1	5	28	13	+15	23
4	Spartak Kherson	17	11	0	6	46	30	+16	22
5	Kahanovych Raion Kharkiv	17	9	1	7	58	28	+30	19
6	Metalurh Staline	17	6	4	7	19	16	+3	16
7	Metalurh Makiivka	17	3	2	12	18	41	−23	8
8	Lokomotyv Zaporizhia	17	4	0	13	19	63	−44	8
9	Spartak Kryvyi Rih	17	2	1	14	15	52	−37	5
10	<etalurh Dnipropetrovsk	9	3	0	6	11	22	−11	6

=== Group 3 ===
Pos	Team	Pld	W	D	L	GF	GA	GD	Pts
1	Trudovi Rezervy Voroshylovhrad	18	11	4	3	35	18	+17	26
2	Zhdanov	18	12	1	5	44	34	+10	25
3	Metalurh Kostyantynivka	18	9	5	4	30	19	+11	23
4	Metalurh Voroshylovsk	18	9	4	5	35	18	+17	22
5	Avanhard Kramatorsk	18	9	4	5	35	25	+10	22
6	Shakhtar Kadiivka	0	?	?	?	–	–	—	0
7	Lokomotyv Artemivsk	0	?	?	?	–	–	—	0
8	Torpedo Kharkiv	18	4	6	8	23	31	−8	14
9	Khimik Horlivka	0	?	?	?	–	–	—	0
10	Shakhtar Rutchenkove	0	?	?	?	–	–	—	0

=== Group 4 ===
Pos	Team	Pld	W	D	L	GF	GA	GD	Pts
1	Spartak Uzhhorod	18	16	1	1	70	13	+57	33
2	DO Lviv	18	14	2	2	70	14	+56	30
3	Dynamo Chernivtsi	18	13	0	5	53	20	+33	26
4	Bilshovyk Mukacheve	18	8	5	5	35	27	+8	21
5	Dynamo Odesa	18	8	4	6	25	27	−2	20
6	Spartak Stanislav	18	7	1	10	30	37	−7	15
7	Dynamo Lutsk	18	4	2	12	15	54	−39	10
8	Naftovyk Boryslav	18	2	5	11	22	50	−28	9
9	Lokomotyv Rivne	18	4	1	13	27	66	−39	9
10	Lokomotyv Ternopil	18	2	3	13	14	53	−39	7

== Final ==
Pos	Team	Pld	W	D	L	GF	GA	GD	Pts	Qualification
1	FC Spartak Uzhhorod	3	2	1	0	6	1	+5	5	Play-off
2	FC Trudovi Rezervy Voroshylovhrad	3	2	0	1	4	5	−1	4	
3	DO Kyiv	3	1	1	1	4	1	+3	3	
4	FC Metalurh Zaporizhia	3	0	0	3	2	9	−7	0	

== Promotional playoff ==
- FC Kharchovyk Odesa – FC Spartak Uzhhorod 1:1 0:1

== Ukrainian clubs at the All-Union level ==
- Class A (3): Shakhtar Stalino, Dynamo Kyiv, Lokomotyv Kharkiv
- Class B (1): Kharchovyk Odesa

== Number of teams by region ==
Number	Region	Team(s)	
Number	Region	Ukrainian SSR	All-Union
8 (1)	Donetsk Oblast	Metalurh Stalino, Metalurh Makiivka, Zhdanov, Metalurh Kostiantynivka, Avanhard Kramatorsk, Lokomotyv Artemivsk, Khimik Horlivka, Shakhtar Rutchenkove	Stakhanovets Stalino
5 (0)	Dnipropetrovsk Oblast	Torpedo Dnipropetrovsk, Lokomotyv Dnipropetrovsk, Metalurh Dniprodzerzhynsk, Spartak Kryvyi Rih, Metalurh Dnipropetrovsk	–
3 (1)	Kharkiv Oblast	Dzerzhynskyi Raion Kharkiv, Kahanovych Raion Kharkiv, Torpedo Kharkiv	Lokomotyv Kharkiv
3 (0)	Luhansk Oblast	Trudovi Rezervy Voroshylovhrad, Metalurh Voroshylovsk, Shakhtar Kadiivka	–
2 (1)	Kyiv Oblast	DO Kyiv, Dynamo Kyiv (klubnaya)	Dynamo Kyiv
2 (1)	Odesa Oblast	Lokomotyv Odesa, Dynamo Odesa	Kharchovyk Odesa
2 (0)	Zaporizhia Oblast	Metalurh Zaporizhia, Lokomotyv Zaporizhia	–
2 (0)	Zakarpattia Oblast	Spartak Uzhhorod, Bilshovyk Mukachevo	–
1 (0)	Kirovohrad Oblast	Traktor Kirovohrad	–
1 (0)	Mykolaiv Oblast	Dynamo Mykolaiv	–
1 (0)	Zhytomyr Oblast	Dynamo Zhytomyr	–
1 (0)	(Soviet Union) Drohobych Oblast	Naftovyk Boryslav	–
1 (0)	Lviv Oblast	DO Lviv	–
1 (0)	Poltava Oblast	Lokomotyv Poltava	–
1 (0)	Vinnytsia Oblast	Dynamo Vinnytsia	–
1 (0)	Kherson Oblast	Spartak Kherson	–
1 (0)	Chernivtsi Oblast	Dynamo Chernivtsi	–
1 (0)	Ivano-Frankivsk Oblast	Spartak Stanislav	–
1 (0)	Rivne Oblast	Lokomotyv Rine	–
1 (0)	Ternopil Oblast	Lokomotyv Ternopil	–
1 (0)	Volyn Oblast	Dynamo Lutsk	–
0 (0)	Sumy Oblast	–	–
0 (0)	Khmelnytskyi Oblast	–	–
0 (0)	Chernihiv Oblast	–	–
0 (0)	(Soviet Union) Izmail Oblast	–	–
