= List of Soviet Union international footballers =

This is a list of Soviet Union international footballers, who have played for the Soviet Union national football team and CIS national football team (10 games) from 1952 to 1992. The Football Federation of the Soviet Union became a member of the FIFA in 1946 and the UEFA in 1954.

== Key ==
Positions key
GK	Goalkeeper
DF	Defender
MF	Midfielder
FW	Forward

Republic
Column "Republic" indicates where each player was born, such as a union republic of the Soviet Union or another country outside of the Soviet Union.
Player
This colour background indicates that the player was born outside of the Soviet Union.
This colour background indicates that the players have continued their international careers for the successor state of the Soviet Union, representing the state of their origin.
This colour background indicates that the players have continued their international careers for the successor state of the Soviet Union, representing other than the state of their origin.
Position
Playing positions are listed according to the player's primary position while playing for the national team.
Caps and goals
Caps and goals comprise those in the qualifying and final tournaments of the FIFA World Cup and UEFA European Championship, as well as the Summer Olympics, and international friendly matches.

== List of players ==
The list is primarily sorted by games capped for the national team, then date of the first match with older ahead, and then alphabetically. All names are in Russian Romanization (see Romanization of Russian; note that the Romanization may differ for some players from union republics other than the Russian Federation). The column "Republic" indicates the union republic of their birth.

Name	Republic	Position	First match	Last match	Caps	Goals
Oleg Blokhin	Ukrainian SSR	FW	1972-07-16	1988-09-21	112	42
Rinat Dasayev	Russian SFSR	GK	1979-09-05	1990-06-09	91	0
Albert Shesternyov	Russian SFSR	DF	1961-09-10	1971-10-27	90	0
Anatoliy Demyanenko	Ukrainian SSR	DF	1981-09-23	1990-06-18	80	6
Vladimir Bessonov	Ukrainian SSR	MF	1977-07-28	1990-06-13	79	4
Sergei Aleinikov	Belarusian SSR	MF	1984-03-28	1992-06-18	77	6
Lev Yashin	Russian SFSR	GK	1954-09-08	1967-07-16	74	0
Murtaz Khurtsilava	Georgian SSR	DF	1965-10-03	1973-08-05	69	6
Oleg Protasov	Ukrainian SSR	FW	1984-03-28	1991-11-13	68	29
Valeriy Voronin	Russian SFSR	MF	1960-09-04	1968-05-21	66	5
Oleg Kuznetsov	East Germany	DF	1986-01-22	1992-06-18	63	1
Vladimir Kaplichnyi	Ukrainian SSR	DF	1968-03-03	1974-10-30	62	0
Valentin Ivanov	Russian SFSR	FW	1955-06-26	1965-07-04	59	26
Vagiz Khidiyatullin	Russian SFSR	MF-DF	1978-09-06	1990-06-18	58	6
Gennadiy Litovchenko	Ukrainian SSR	MF	1984-03-28	1990-06-18	57	14
Viktor Kolotov	Russian SFSR	MF	1970-10-28	1978-05-14	55	22
Igor Netto	Russian SFSR	MF	1952-07-15	1965-05-16	54	4
Igor Chislenko	Russian SFSR	FW	1959-10-03	1968-06-01	53	20
Yevgeniy Lovchev	Russian SFSR	DF	1969-07-25	1977-04-30	52	1
Anatoliy Banishevskiy	Azerbaijan SSR	FW	1965-07-04	1972-06-18	50	19
Vladimir Muntyan	Ukrainian SSR	MF	1968-08-01	1976-05-26	49	7
Revaz Dzodzuashvili	Georgian SSR	DF	1969-02-20	1974-05-20	49	0
Leonid Buryak	Ukrainian SSR	MF	1974-05-20	1983-10-09	49	8
Tengiz Sulakvelidze	Georgian SSR	DF	1980-03-26	1988-06-15	49	2
Slava Metreveli	Russian SFSR	FW	1958-09-28	1970-05-06	48	11
Yevgeniy Rudakov	Russian SFSR	GK	1968-03-07	1976-05-22	48	0
Anatoliy Konkov	Ukrainian SSR	MF	1971-04-28	1978-10-11	47	8
Vasiliy Rats	Ukrainian SSR	MF	1986-04-23	1990-06-09	47	4
Yuriy Gavrilov	Russian SFSR	MF	1978-11-19	1985-10-30	46	10
Aleksandr Chivadze	Russian SFSR	DF	1980-03-26	1987-04-18	46	3
Sergei Baltacha	Ukrainian SSR	DF	1980-07-12	1988-06-25	45	2
Vladimir Onishchenko	Ukrainian SSR	FW	1972-06-07	1977-05-18	44	11
Valentin Afonin	Russian SFSR	DF	1965-09-04	1970-10-28	42	0
Aleksandr Zavarov	Ukrainian SSR	MF	1985-08-07	1990-06-18	41	6
Aleksei Mikhailichenko	Ukrainian SSR	MF	1987-04-29	1992-06-18	41	9
Eduard Malofeyev	Russian SFSR	FW	1963-09-22	1968-06-08	40	6
Yozhef Sabo	Hungary	MF	1965-10-03	1972-09-08	40	8
Anatoliy Byshovets	Ukrainian SSR	FW	1966-10-16	1972-07-06	39	15
Eduard Streltsov	Russian SFSR	FW	1955-06-26	1968-05-04	38	25
Gennadiy Yevryuzhikhin	Russian SFSR	FW	1966-10-23	1973-10-17	37	6
Sergei Radionov	Russian SFSR	FW	1980-08-27	1990-03-28	37	8
Andrey Zygmantovich	Belarusian SSR	MF-DF	1984-03-28	1990-06-18	36	3
Mikhail Meskhi	Georgian SSR	FW	1959-09-06	1966-04-20	35	4
Yuriy Istomin	Ukrainian SSR	DF	1967-11-29	1972-09-10	34	0
Aleksandr Bubnov	Russian SFSR	DF	1977-07-28	1987-10-28	34	1
Fedor Cherenkov	Russian SFSR	MF	1979-09-12	1990-04-25	34	12
Khoren Oganesyan	Armenian SSR	MF	1979-10-14	1984-10-10	34	6
Anatoliy Maslyonkin	Russian SFSR	MF-DF	1955-08-21	1962-06-10	33	1
Galimzyan Khusainov	Russian SFSR	FW	1960-08-17	1969-09-10	33	4
Igor Belanov	Ukrainian SSR	FW	1985-05-02	1990-04-25	33	8
Anatoliy Ilyin	Russian SFSR	FW	1952-07-15	1959-10-03	31	16
Vladimir Troshkin	Ukrainian SSR	DF	1972-04-19	1977-05-18	31	1
Sergei Gotsmanov	Belarusian SSR	MF	1984-05-15	1988-09-21	31	2
Viktor Ponedelnik	Russian SFSR	FW	1960-05-19	1966-10-23	29	20
Anzor Kavazashvili	Georgian SSR	GK	1965-06-27	1970-06-14	29	0
Igor Dobrovolskiy	Ukrainian SSR	MF	1986-03-26	1992-06-18	29	8
Boris Kuznetsov	Russian SFSR	DF	1954-09-26	1959-10-03	26	0
Vladimir Veremeyev	Russian SFSR	MF	1973-03-28	1979-10-31	26	2
Ramaz Shengelia	Georgian SSR	FW	1979-03-28	1983-07-26	26	10
Sergei Andreyev	Ukrainian SSR	FW	1979-10-31	1983-07-26	26	8
Andrei Chernyshov	Russian SFSR	DF	1990-08-29	1992-06-18	26	0
Boris Tatushin	Russian SFSR	FW	1954-09-08	1957-11-24	25	7
Vladimir Ponomaryov	Russian SFSR	DF	1964-10-11	1969-08-06	25	0
Aleksandr Makhovikov	Russian SFSR	MF-DF	1972-04-30	1979-11-21	25	1
Mikhail Fomenko	Ukrainian SSR	DF	1972-07-16	1976-07-29	24	0
Igor Kolyvanov	Russian SFSR	FW	1989-08-23	1992-06-15	24	3
Akhrik Tsveiba	Georgian SSR	DF	1990-02-22	1992-06-15	24	2
Igor Shalimov	Russian SFSR	MF	1990-06-13	1992-06-12	24	2
Yuriy Voynov	Russian SFSR	MF	1954-09-26	1960-08-17	23	3
Mikhail Ogonkov	Russian SFSR	DF	1955-06-26	1958-05-18	23	0
Vasiliy Danilov	Russian SFSR	DF	1965-05-16	1967-05-28	23	0
Andrei Kanchelskis	Ukrainian SSR	MF	1989-08-30	1992-06-03	23	3
Vladimir Fedotov	Russian SFSR	MF	1970-10-28	1974-10-30	22	4
Aleksandr Minayev	Russian SFSR	MF	1976-03-20	1979-06-27	22	4
Vitaliy Daraselia	Georgian SSR	MF	1978-11-19	1982-07-04	22	3
Anatoliy Bashashkin	Russian SFSR	DF	1952-07-15	1978-09-20	21	0
Viktor Serebryanikov	Ukrainian SSR	MF	1964-10-11	1970-06-10	21	3
Givi Nodia	Georgian SSR	FW	1967-11-29	1973-10-17	21	5
Viktor Matviyenko	Ukrainian SSR	DF	1971-06-14	1977-05-18	21	0
Sergei Borovskiy	Belarusian SSR	DF	1981-05-30	1985-03-27	21	0
Viktor Chanov	Ukrainian SSR	GK	1982-03-10	1990-05-16	21	0
Sergei Gorlukovich	Belarusian SSR	DF	1988-10-19	1991-03-27	21	1
Vasiliy Kulkov	Russian SFSR	MF-DF	1989-04-26	1992-02-19	21	0
Sergei Salnikov	Russian SFSR	FW	1954-09-08	1958-06-19	20	11
Nikita Simonyan	Russian SFSR	FW	1954-09-08	1958-10-22	20	10
Viktor Anichkin	Russian SFSR	DF	1964-05-20	1968-06-01	20	1
Vitaliy Khmelnitskiy	Ukrainian SSR	FW	1965-10-03	1971-09-18	20	7
Andrey Bal	Ukrainian SSR	MF-DF	1981-11-29	1989-08-23	20	1
Dmitriy Kuznetsov	Russian SFSR	MF-DF	1990-11-21	1992-06-18	20	2
Givi Chokheli	Georgian SSR	DF	1960-07-06	1962-06-10	19	0
Yuriy Pshenichnikov	Uzbek SSR	GK	1966-09-18	1970-10-28	19	0
Sergei Olshanskiy	Russian SFSR	DF	1972-08-06	1977-04-24	19	0
David Kipiani	Georgian SSR	FW-MF	1974-04-17	1981-05-30	19	7
Sergei Prigoda	Russian SFSR	DF	1977-07-28	1979-09-12	19	0
Sergei Shavlo	Ukrainian SSR	MF	1979-09-05	1985-03-27	19	0
Nikolay Larionov	Russian SFSR	MF-DF	1983-03-23	1986-09-24	19	2
Pavel Yakovenko	Ukrainian SSR	MF	1986-05-07	1990-03-28	19	1
Vladimir Fyodorov	Uzbek SSR	FW	1974-10-30	1978-05-14	18	0
Ivan Yaremchuk	Ukrainian SSR	MF	1986-04-23	1990-06-18	18	2
Gennadiy Logofet	Russian SFSR	MF-DF	1963-09-22	1970-06-14	17	0
Yuriy Degtyaryov	Ukrainian SSR	GK	1968-08-01	1979-04-19	17	0
Anatoliy Isayev	Russian SFSR	FW	1955-08-21	1959-10-03	16	6
Kakhi Asatiani	Georgian SSR	MF	1968-03-03	1972-07-02	16	5
Stefan Reshko	Ukrainian SSR	DF	1975-04-02	1976-07-29	15	0
Vasiliy Zhupikov	Russian SFSR	DF	1977-09-07	1984-05-15	15	0
Dmitriy Kharin	Russian SFSR	GK	1988-11-21	1992-06-18	15	0
Aleksandr Mostovoy	Russian SFSR	MF	1990-11-03	1992-04-29	15	3
Sergei Yuran	Ukrainian SSR	FW	1990-11-21	1992-06-18	15	2
Konstantin Krizhevskiy	Russian SFSR	DF	1952-07-15	1958-06-19	14	0
Vladimir Kesarev	Russian SFSR	DF	1957-09-22	1963-05-22	14	0
Viktor Bannikov	Ukrainian SSR	GK	1964-11-29	1972-08-06	14	0
Nikolay Kiselev	Russian SFSR	MF	1969-02-20	1971-10-27	14	0
Anatoliy Puzach	Russian SFSR	FW	1969-07-25	1972-10-18	14	2
Oleg Dolmatov	Russian SFSR	MF	1971-09-18	1977-04-30	14	0
Aleksandr Berezhnoy	Ukrainian SSR	MF-DF	1976-11-28	1979-10-31	14	0
Georgiy Kondratyev	Belarusian SSR	FW	1984-10-10	1986-03-26	14	4
Aleksei Paramonov	Russian SFSR	FW-MF	1954-09-08	1957-10-20	13	0
Vitaliy Shevchenko	Azerbaijan SSR	FW	1970-10-28	1972-04-19	13	4
Viktor Zviagintsev	Ukrainian SSR	DF	1975-10-12	1976-07-29	13	1
Yuriy Chesnokov	Russian SFSR	FW	1976-11-28	1979-07-04	13	5
Dmitriy Galiamin	Russian SFSR	DF	1990-10-09	1992-02-19	13	0
Nikolay Tishchenko	Russian SFSR	DF	1954-09-08	1956-12-05	12	0
Viktor Tsaryov	Russian SFSR	MF-DF	1958-05-18	1963-05-22	12	0
Eduard Dubinskiy	Ukrainian SSR	DF	1961-06-24	1963-10-13	12	0
Arkadiy Andreasyan	Azerbaijan SSR	MF	1972-08-06	1975-11-29	12	1
Vladimir Pilguy	Ukrainian SSR	GK	1972-09-01	1977-09-07	12	0
Nikolay Gontar	Russian SFSR	GK	1976-11-28	1979-10-31	12	0
Vadim Yevtushenko	Ukrainian SSR	FW	1980-06-15	1987-02-18	12	1
Valentin Bubukin	Russian SFSR	FW	1959-09-27	1961-08-23	11	4
Gennadiy Gusarov	Russian SFSR	FW-MF	1961-06-24	1964-06-17	11	4
Vladimir Gutsayev	Georgian SSR	FW	1972-03-29	1982-03-10	11	1
Vyacheslav Semyonov	Ukrainian SSR	FW-MF	1972-06-29	1972-10-18	11	4
Vladimir Astapovskiy	Russian SFSR	GK	1975-11-29	1977-04-30	11	0
Shota Khinchagashvili	Georgian SSR	DF	1976-11-28	1979-07-04	11	0
Aleksandr Uvarov	Russian SFSR	GK	1990-04-25	1991-05-29	11	0
Aleksandr Lenyov	Russian SFSR	MF-DF	1966-10-16	1968-08-01	10	0
Mikhail Gershkovich	Russian SFSR	FW	1968-06-16	1971-04-28	10	3
Gennadiy Morozov	Russian SFSR	DF	1985-08-07	1986-06-09	10	0
Sergei Kiryakov	Russian SFSR	FW	1989-08-23	1992-06-18	10	5
Stanislav Cherchesov	Russian SFSR	GK	1990-11-23	1992-06-03	10	0
Anatoliy Krutikov	Russian SFSR	DF	1959-10-03	1964-11-04	9	0
Aleksei Mamykin	Russian SFSR	FW	1961-09-10	1962-06-10	9	9
Leonid Ostrovskiy	Latvia	DF	1961-11-18	1966-07-20	9	0
Yuriy Vasenin	Russian SFSR	MF	1972-06-29	1973-09-05	9	0
Oleg Romantsev	Russian SFSR	DF	1980-03-26	1982-05-05	9	0
Vladimir Tatarchuk	Russian SFSR	MF	1987-04-18	1991-05-21	9	1
Vladimir Maslachenko	Ukrainian SSR	GK	1960-05-19	1962-04-27	8	0
Nikolay Manoshin	Russian SFSR	MF	1960-08-17	1961-11-29	8	0
Viktor Shustikov	Russian SFSR	DF	1963-09-22	1964-11-29	8	0
Eduard Mudrik	Ukrainian SSR	DF	1963-11-10	1964-10-11	8	1
Valeriy Maslov	Russian SFSR	MF	1964-05-20	1967-11-29	8	2
Georgiy Sichinava	Georgian SSR	MF	1964-11-22	1966-09-18	8	0
Valeriy Porkuyan	Ukrainian SSR	FW	1966-07-20	1970-05-06	8	4
Levon Ishtoyan	Armenian SSR	FW	1971-09-18	1974-04-17	8	0
Viktor Kuznetsov	Russian SFSR	MF	1972-06-29	1973-08-26	8	0
Anatoliy Kuksov	Ukrainian SSR	MF	1972-07-02	1972-09-08	8	0
Leonid Nazarenko	Russian SFSR	FW	1976-03-10	1976-07-29	8	2
Aleksandr Maksimenkov	Russian SFSR	MF	1977-03-20	1979-09-12	8	1
Valeriy Gazzayev	Russian SFSR	FW	1978-09-06	1983-03-23	8	4
Vadim Tishchenko	Ukrainian SSR	MF	1987-08-29	1990-09-12	8	0
Viktor Pasulko	Ukrainian SSR	FW-MF	1988-02-20	1988-06-25	8	1
Yuriy Savichev	Russian SFSR	FW	1988-10-19	1990-04-25	8	0
Oleg Luzhnyi	Ukrainian SSR	DF	1989-04-26	1990-02-24	8	0
Viktor Getmanov	Georgian SSR	DF	1965-12-01	1966-09-18	7	0
Guram Tskhovrebov	Georgian SSR	DF	1967-07-28	1967-11-29	7	0
Aleksey Yeskov	Russian SFSR	FW-MF	1967-10-01	1972-08-06	7	0
Yuriy Yeliseyev	Ukrainian SSR	FW	1972-06-29	1972-09-03	7	2
Revaz Chelebadze	Georgian SSR	FW	1977-09-07	1980-07-12	7	3
Yuriy Susloparov	Ukrainian SSR	MF-DF	1981-10-07	1982-06-14	7	0
Boris Pozdnyakov	Russian SFSR	DF	1984-03-28	1987-04-18	7	0
Aleksandr Borodyuk	Russian SFSR	FW	1989-02-21	1991-03-27	7	1
Oleg Sergeyev	Russian SFSR	FW	1991-05-23	1992-02-12	7	1
Igor Ledyakhov	Russian SFSR	MF	1992-01-25	1992-06-03	7	1
Aleksei Korneyev	Russian SFSR	MF-DF	1964-05-13	1966-07-28	6	0
Gennadiy Matveyev	Russian SFSR	FW	1964-10-11	1966-10-16	6	2
Boris Kazakov	Russian SFSR	FW	1965-05-16	1966-09-18	6	1
Oleg Kopayev	Russian SFSR	FW	1965-11-21	1966-05-18	6	0
Fedor Medvid	Hungary	MF	1966-10-23	1968-03-10	6	1
Boris Kopeykin	Russian SFSR	FW	1970-10-28	1972-05-26	6	0
Eduard Kozinkevich	Ukrainian SSR	FW	1972-04-19	1972-06-18	6	1
Oganes Zanazanyan	Greece	MF	1972-08-28	1972-09-10	6	1
Aleksandr Tarkhanov	Kazakh SSR	FW-MF	1976-11-28	1983-10-09	6	0
Sergei Stukashov	Kazakh SSR	FW	1984-03-28	1985-03-27	6	2
Sergei Dmitriyev	Russian SFSR	FW	1985-01-25	1988-04-27	6	1
Ivan Vyshnevskyi	Ukrainian SSR	DF	1985-01-25	1988-06-01	6	0
Vladimir Lyutyi	Ukrainian SSR	FW-MF	1990-03-28	1992-06-12	6	1
Igor Korneyev	Russian SFSR	FW	1991-05-21	1992-06-18	6	3
Kakhaber Tskhadadze	Georgian SSR	DF	1992-01-25	1992-06-18	6	1
Vladimir Ryzhkin	Russian SFSR	FW	1956-10-21	1957-06-01	5	0
German Apukhtin	Russian SFSR	FW	1957-06-01	1961-06-24	5	0
Vladimir Belyayev	Russian SFSR	GK	1957-08-15	1958-10-22	5	0
Aleksandr Ivanov	Russian SFSR	FW	1958-06-08	1959-09-06	5	1
Viktor Kanevskiy	Ukrainian SSR	FW	1958-08-30	1962-06-03	5	0
Valeriy Korolenkov	Russian SFSR	MF	1963-05-22	1964-05-13	5	0
Georgiy Ryabov	Estonia	DF	1963-05-22	1965-07-04	5	0
Vladimir Glotov	Russian SFSR	DF	1963-12-01	1964-10-11	5	0
Anatoliy Baidachnyi	Russian SFSR	FW	1972-04-30	1972-06-18	5	0
Georgiy Yartsev	Russian SFSR	FW	1978-09-06	1979-10-14	5	0
Yuriy Romenskiy	Azerbaijan SSR	GK	1978-11-19	1979-07-04	5	0
Ivan Getsko	Ukrainian SSR	FW	1990-09-12	1990-11-30	5	0
Andrei Pyatnitskiy	Uzbek SSR	MF	1992-01-25	1992-02-19	5	2
Ivan Mozer	Czechoslovakia	FW	1956-07-01	1956-09-23	4	0
Alekper Mamedov	Azerbaijan SSR	FW	1958-08-30	1959-10-03	4	0
Vadim Sosnikhin	Ukrainian SSR	DF	1966-10-16	1971-09-18	4	0
Viktor Papayev	Russian SFSR	MF	1969-08-06	1973-06-10	4	0
Valeriy Zykov	Russian SFSR	DF	1970-05-06	1971-09-22	4	0
Nikolay Dolgov	Russian SFSR	MF	1971-02-17	1971-06-14	4	0
Vadim Nikonov	Russian SFSR	FW-MF	1973-03-28	1973-08-05	4	0
Manuchar Machaidze	Georgian SSR	MF	1974-04-17	1979-05-19	4	0
Vladimir Sakharov	Russian SFSR	FW-MF	1975-10-12	1976-03-24	4	0
Viktor Kruglov	Russian SFSR	DF	1976-11-28	1977-04-30	4	0
Yuriy Adzhem	Russian SFSR	MF-DF	1979-03-28	1979-05-19	4	0
Vakhtang Koridze	Georgian SSR	MF-DF	1979-03-28	1979-05-19	4	1
Stepan Yurchishin	Ukrainian SSR	FW	1979-09-05	1979-10-31	4	1
Vladimir Lozinskiy	Russian SFSR	DF	1979-10-14	1982-10-13	4	0
Oleg Rodin	Russian SFSR	MF-DF	1979-11-21	1980-05-23	4	0
Vyacheslav Sukristov	Lithuanian SSR	MF-DF	1988-03-23	1988-09-21	4	0
Valdas Ivanauskas	Lithuanian SSR	MF-DF	1988-10-19	1988-11-27	4	0
Andrei Ivanov	Russian SFSR	DF	1991-06-13	1992-06-12	4	0
Igor Chugainov	Russian SFSR	DF	1992-01-25	1992-02-12	4	0
Sergei Mandreko	Tajik SSR	MF	1992-01-25	1992-02-12	4	0
Yuriy Nikiforov	Ukrainian SSR	DF	1992-01-25	1992-02-12	4	0
Viktor Onopko	Ukrainian SSR	DF	1992-04-29	1992-06-18	4	0
Vsevolod Bobrov	Russian SFSR	FW	1952-07-15	1952-07-22	3	5
Avtandil Gogoberidze	Georgian SSR	FW	1952-07-15	1954-09-26	3	1
Leonid Ivanov	Russian SFSR	GK	1952-07-15	1952-07-22	3	0
Yuriy Nyrkov	Russian SFSR	DF	1952-07-15	1952-07-22	3	0
Aleksandr Petrov	Russian SFSR	MF	1952-07-15	1952-07-22	3	1
Vasiliy Trofimov	Russian SFSR	FW	1952-07-15	1952-07-22	3	2
Yuriy Sedov	Russian SFSR	DF	1954-09-08	1955-06-26	3	0
Viktor Fomin	Ukrainian SSR	FW	1955-06-26	1957-07-27	3	0
Yuriy Kuznetsov	Azerbaijan SSR	FW	1955-08-21	1955-09-25	3	3
Anatoliy Porkhunov	Russian SFSR	DF	1955-08-21	1955-10-23	3	0
Boris Razinskiy	Russian SFSR	GK	1955-10-23	1956-12-01	3	0
Genrikh Fedosov	Russian SFSR	FW	1957-11-24	1959-10-03	3	1
Yuriy Falin	Russian SFSR	FW-MF	1958-05-18	1964-11-04	3	0
Vladimir Petrov	Russian SFSR	DF	1960-08-17	1964-11-04	3	0
Gennadiy Krasnitskiy	Uzbek SSR	FW	1961-05-21	1966-09-18	3	1
Aleksandr Medakin	Russian SFSR	DF	1961-05-21	1961-07-01	3	0
Valeriy Dikarev	Azerbaijan SSR	DF	1964-10-11	1965-05-23	3	0
Nikolay Osianin	Russian SFSR	FW-DF	1965-12-04	1969-09-24	3	1
Eduard Markarov	Azerbaijan SSR	FW	1966-06-05	1968-08-01	3	0
Nikolay Smolnikov	Azerbaijan SSR	FW	1968-03-03	1968-03-10	3	0
Vladimir Levchenko	Ukrainian SSR	DF	1968-03-07	1968-06-16	3	0
Aleksandr Chumakov	Russian SFSR	MF-DF	1968-06-16	1969-08-06	3	0
Vladimir Malygin	Ukrainian SSR	DF	1972-06-29	1972-07-06	3	0
Aleksandr Tkachenko	Ukrainian SSR	GK	1972-06-29	1972-07-06	3	0
Anatoliy Zinchenko	Russian SFSR	FW	1969-09-24	1973-06-21	3	0
Anatoliy Kozhemiakin	Russian SFSR	FW	1972-03-29	1973-09-26	3	0
Nikolay Abramov	Russian SFSR	DF	1972-05-13	1976-03-20	3	0
Sergei Kuznetsov	Russian SFSR	MF-DF	1972-06-29	1972-07-06	3	0
Aleksandr Zhuravlyov	Ukrainian SSR	MF-DF	1972-06-29	1972-07-06	3	0
Sergei Nikulin	Tajik SSR	DF	1974-10-30	1979-10-14	3	0
Aleksandr Prokhorov	Belarusian SSR	GK	1976-03-20	1976-04-24	3	0
Nazar Petrosyan	Turkmen SSR	FW-MF	1976-11-28	1977-03-23	3	0
Aleksandr Novikov	Russian SFSR	DF	1977-03-20	1977-05-18	3	0
Vladimir Golubev	Russian SFSR	DF	1977-09-07	1978-04-05	3	0
Tamaz Kostava	Georgian SSR	DF	1978-11-19	1978-11-26	3	1
Valeriy Broshin	Russian SFSR	MF	1987-02-18	1990-08-29	3	0
Viktor Losev	Russian SFSR	DF	1987-08-29	1987-09-23	3	0
Nikolay Savichev	Russian SFSR	FW-MF	1988-11-21	1988-11-27	3	0
Oleg Shirinbekov	Tajik SSR	MF-DF	1988-11-21	1988-11-27	3	0
Gela Ketashvili	Georgian SSR	DF	1989-05-10	1989-08-23	3	0
Sergei Fokin	Russian SFSR	DF	1989-08-23	1990-05-16	3	0
Valeriy Shmarov	Russian SFSR	FW	1989-08-23	1990-08-29	3	0
Gennadiy Perepadenko	Ukrainian SSR	MF	1990-11-21	1990-11-30	3	0
Dmitriy Cheryshev	Russian SFSR	FW	1992-01-25	1992-02-02	3	0
Dmitriy Khlestov	Russian SFSR	DF	1992-01-25	1992-02-02	3	0
Omari Tetradze	Georgian SSR	MF	1992-01-28	1992-02-12	3	0
Konstantin Beskov	Russian SFSR	FW	1952-07-20	1952-07-22	2	0
Valentin Nikolayev	Russian SFSR	FW	1952-07-20	1952-07-22	2	0
Vladimir Shabrov	Russian SFSR	FW	1955-09-16	1955-10-23	2	2
Yozhef Betsa	Ukrainian SSR	MF	1955-10-23	1956-11-29	2	0
Valeriy Urin	Russian SFSR	FW	1958-08-30	1959-10-03	2	0
Valeriy Lobanovskiy	Ukrainian SSR	FW	1960-09-04	1961-05-21	2	0
Vyacheslav Ambartsumyan	Russian SFSR	FW-MF	1961-09-10	1961-11-12	2	0
Ramaz Urushadze	Georgian SSR	GK	1963-10-13	1964-05-20	2	0
Vladimir Barkaya	Georgian SSR	FW	1965-06-27	1965-07-04	2	2
Vladimir Sarayev	Russian SFSR	DF	1965-06-27	1967-05-28	2	0
Vyacheslav Andreyuk	Russian SFSR	DF	1966-10-23	1966-11-01	2	0
Kazbek Tuayev	Azerbaijan SSR	FW	1967-10-01	1967-10-08	2	0
Vladimir Basalayev	Russian SFSR	DF	1968-06-16	1968-08-01	2	0
Vladimir Kozlov	Russian SFSR	FW	1968-06-16	1973-06-10	2	0
Maryan Plakhetko	Ukrainian SSR	DF	1968-06-16	1971-02-17	2	0
Vladimir Eshtrekov	Russian SFSR	FW	1971-02-17	1971-02-28	2	0
Igor Kulchitskiy	Ukrainian SSR	MF	1971-02-17	1971-02-19	2	0
Vladimir Dudarenko	Ukrainian SSR	FW	1971-02-19	1971-02-28	2	0
Leonid Shmuts	Ukrainian SSR	GK	1971-02-19	1971-02-28	2	0
Andrei Yakubik	Russian SFSR	FW-MF	1972-09-01	1972-09-10	2	0
Yuriy Saukh	Russian SFSR	DF	1976-05-26	1976-06-23	2	0
Anatoliy Parov	Russian SFSR	DF	1976-11-28	1976-12-01	2	0
Petr Slobodyan	Ukrainian SSR	FW	1976-11-28	1976-12-01	2	0
Vladimir Kazachenok	Russian SFSR	FW	1976-12-01	1979-10-31	2	0
Seilda Baishakov	Kazakh SSR	DF	1977-04-30	1977-05-10	2	0
Valeriy Novikov	Russian SFSR	GK	1978-04-05	1984-08-19	2	0
Valeriy Petrakov	Russian SFSR	FW	1978-04-05	1978-05-14	2	1
Mikhail An	Uzbek SSR	MF	1978-09-06	1978-09-20	2	0
Aleksandr Khapsalis	Kazakh SSR	FW-MF	1979-07-04	1979-10-14	2	1
Aleksandr Mirzoyan	Azerbaijan SSR	DF	1979-11-21	1980-10-15	2	0
Nikolay Fedorenko	Ukrainian SSR	FW-MF	1980-03-26	1980-04-29	2	1
Viktor Yanushevskiy	Belarusian SSR	DF	1984-03-28	1984-05-15	2	0
Mikhail Biryukov	Russian SFSR	GK	1984-08-19	1985-01-25	2	0
Yevgeniy Yarovenko	Kazakh SSR	DF	1987-08-29	1987-09-23	2	0
Sergei Shmatovalenko	Ukrainian SSR	DF	1988-09-21	1990-05-16	2	0
Aleksei Cherednik	Tajik SSR	DF	1989-02-21	1989-03-22	2	0
Andrei Mokh	Russian SFSR	MF-DF	1990-11-21	1990-11-30	2	0
Dmitriy Radchenko	Russian SFSR	FW	1990-11-21	1990-11-23	2	0
Andrei Sidelnikov	Ukrainian SSR	MF-DF	1990-11-23	1990-11-30	2	0
Valeriy Kleimenov	Russian SFSR	GK	1992-01-28	1992-02-02	2	0
Sergei Shustikov	Russian SFSR	MF-DF	1992-02-02	1992-02-12	2	0
Aleksandr Teniagin	Russian SFSR	FW	1952-07-15		1	0
Fridrikh Maryutin	Russian SFSR	FW	1952-07-20		1	0
Avtandil Chkuaseli	Georgian SSR	FW	1952-07-22		1	0
Nikolay Parshin	Russian SFSR	FW-MF	1955-08-21		1	1
Mikhail Perevalov	Russian SFSR	DF	1955-09-16		1	0
Oleg Makarov	Russian SFSR	GK	1957-07-27		1	0
Yuriy Kovalyov	Russian SFSR	FW-MF	1957-11-24		1	0
Vladimir Agapov	Russian SFSR	FW	1958-08-30		1	0
Oleg Morozov	Russian SFSR	FW	1958-08-30		1	0
Viktor Voroshilov	Russian SFSR	FW	1958-08-30		1	1
Valentin Ivakin	Russian SFSR	GK	1959-10-03		1	0
Boris Batanov	Russian SFSR	FW-MF	1961-06-18		1	0
Lev Burchalkin	Russian SFSR	FW	1964-05-20		1	0
Vladimir Lisitsin	Kazakh SSR	GK	1964-05-20		1	0
Sergei Rozhkov	Russian SFSR	FW-MF	1964-11-04		1	0
Ivan Varlamov	Russian SFSR	DF	1964-11-04		1	0
Igor Ryomin	Russian SFSR	DF	1964-11-22		1	0
Andrey Biba	Ukrainian SSR	MF	1965-07-04		1	0
Leonard Adamov	Ukrainian SSR	FW	1965-09-04		1	0
Alfred Fyodorov	Russian SFSR	MF	1965-09-04		1	0
Sergei Kutivadze	Kazakh SSR	MF	1965-09-04		1	0
Vladimir Shcherbakov	Russian SFSR	FW	1965-09-04		1	0
Aleksandr Syomin	Azerbaijan SSR	DF	1968-06-16		1	0
Georgiy Vyun	Russian SFSR	MF	1968-06-16		1	1
Vyacheslav Marushko	Russian SFSR	MF	1968-09-04		1	0
Viktor Lysenko	Ukrainian SSR	DF	1969-02-20		1	0
Lev Brovarskiy	Ukrainian SSR	MF	1971-04-28		1	0
Vadim Ivanov	Russian SFSR	MF-DF	1971-04-28		1	0
Anatoliy Shulzhenko	Ukrainian SSR	DF	1971-04-28		1	0
Valeriy Kopiy	Russian SFSR	FW	1972-06-29		1	0
Sergei Morozov	Russian SFSR	MF	1972-06-29		1	0
Nikolay Pinchuk	Russian SFSR	DF	1972-06-29		1	0
Mikhail Forkash	Ukrainian SSR	GK	1972-07-06		1	0
Aleksandr Deryomov	Russian SFSR	DF	1973-08-05		1	0
Anatoliy Shepel	Ukrainian SSR	FW	1974-05-20		1	0
Valeriy Zuyev	Ukrainian SSR	DF	1975-11-23		1	0
Vyacheslav Leschuk	Ukrainian SSR	MF-DF	1976-03-20		1	0
Vladimir Suchilin	Russian SFSR	MF	1976-11-28		1	0
Valeriy Gorbunov	Ukrainian SSR	DF	1978-09-06		1	0
Edgar Gess	Tajik SSR	FW-MF	1979-09-05		1	0
Otari Gabelia	Georgian SSR	GK	1979-11-21		1	0
Viktor Samokhin	Russian SFSR	DF	1979-11-21		1	0
Yevgeniy Sidorov	Russian SFSR	FW-MF	1980-03-26		1	0
Aleksandr Prokopenko	Belarusian SSR	MF	1980-07-12		1	0
Viktor Kaplun	Ukrainian SSR	DF	1980-12-04		1	0
Igor Ponomaryov	Azerbaijan SSR	MF	1980-12-04		1	0
Sergei Shvetsov	Georgian SSR	FW-MF	1980-12-04		1	0
Nodar Khizanishvili	Georgian SSR	DF	1982-04-14		1	0
Yuriy Pudyshev	Russian SFSR	MF	1984-02-28		1	0
Vyacheslav Chanov	Russian SFSR	GK	1984-03-28		1	0
Igor Gurinovich	Belarusian SSR	FW	1984-03-28		1	0
Nikolay Pavlov	Ukrainian SSR	MF-DF	1984-03-28		1	0
Viktor Shishkin	Russian SFSR	MF-DF	1984-03-28		1	0
Viktor Grachev	Ukrainian SSR	FW	1984-05-15		1	0
Aleksandr Vorobyov	Russian SFSR	FW	1984-08-19		1	0
Sigitas Yakubauskas	Lithuanian SSR	FW-DF	1985-08-07		1	0
Andrei Kalaichev	Russian SFSR	MF-DF	1989-02-21		1	0
Yevgeniy Dolgov	Russian SFSR	DF	1990-08-29		1	0
Valeriy Karpin	Estonian SSR	MF	1992-04-29		1	0

=== Former Soviet Union internationals at the Soviet Union successors ===
==== Belarus ====
- Sergei Aleinikov
- Sergei Gotsmanov
- Andrey Zygmantovich

==== Ukraine ====
- Ivan Getsko
- Oleg Kuznetsov (East Germany)
- Gennadiy Litovchenko
- Oleg Luzhnyi
- Aleksei Mikhailichenko
- Yuriy Nikiforov
- Oleg Protasov
- Sergei Shmatovalenko
- Akhrik Tsveiba (Georgia)

==== Russia ====
- Aleksandr Borodyuk
- Stanislav Cherchesov
- Andrei Chernyshov
- Dmitriy Cheryshev
- Igor Chugainov
- Igor Dobrovolskiy (Ukraine)
- Dmitriy Galiamin
- Sergei Gorlukovich (Belarus)
- Andrei Ivanov
- Andrei Kanchelskis (Ukraine)
- Valeriy Karpin (Estonia)
- Dmitriy Kharin
- Dmitriy Khlestov
- Sergei Kiryakov
- Igor Kolyvanov
- Igor Korneyev
- Vasiliy Kulkov
- Dmitriy Kuznetsov
- Igor Ledyakhov
- Andrei Mokh
- Aleksandr Mostovoy
- Viktor Onopko (Ukraine)
- Dmitriy Radchenko
- Oleg Sergeyev
- Igor Shalimov
- Vladimir Tatarchuk
- Omari Tetradze (Georgia)
- Sergei Yuran (Ukraine)

==== Uzbekistan ====
- Andrei Pyatnitskiy

==== Lithuania ====
- Valdas Ivanauskas
- Vyacheslav Sukristov

==== Tajikistan ====
- Sergei Mandreko

==== Turkmenistan ====
- Valeriy Broshin (Russia)

==== Georgia ====
- Gela Ketashvili
