= Yevhen Rudakov club =

Yevhen Rudakov club (Ukrainian: Клуб Євгена Рудакова) is an unofficial list of Soviet and Ukrainian football goalkeepers that have achieved 100 or more clean sheets during their professional career in top Soviet and Ukrainian league, cup, European cups, national team and foreign league and cup. This club is named after the first Soviet (Ukrainian) goalkeeper to achieve 100 clean sheets - Yevhen Rudakov.

This list of honor was established by Ukrainian journalist Viktor Khokhliuk.

== Which clean sheets are counted ==
Traditionally, counted goals and clean sheets in the following matches:

1. UL - goals scored in top leagues of Ukrainian football competitions.
2. UC - goals in Ukrainian Cup and Supercup scored in the stages where top league teams participate.
3. EC - goals scored in European Champion Clubs Cup, UEFA Champions League, UEFA Europa League, UEFA Cup, Cup Winners Cup and Intertoto Cup for both home and foreign clubs.
4. NT - goals scored for national and olympic teams of Ukraine, USSR, CIS in the official matches.
5. SL - goals scored in top leagues of Soviet football competitions..
6. SC - goals in Soviet Cup and Supercup scored in the stages where top league teams participate.
7. FL - goals scored in top leagues of foreign football competitions: Argentina, Armenia, Austria, Azerbaijan, Belarus, Belgium, Brazil, Bulgaria, China, Croatia, Cyprus, Czech Republic, Denmark, England, Finland, France, Georgia, Germany, Greece, Hungary, Italy, Israel, Japan, Kazakhstan, Mexico, Moldova, Netherlands, Norway, Poland, Portugal, Romania, Russia, Serbia, Scotland, Slovakia, Slovenia, South Korea, Sweden, Spain, Switzerland, Turkey, United States, Uzbekistan
8. FC - goals in foreign Cup and Supercup scored in the stages where top league teams participate: Argentina, Armenia, Austria, Azerbaijan, Belarus, Belgium, Brazil, Bulgaria, China, Croatia, Cyprus, Czech Republic, Denmark, England, Finland, France, Georgia, Germany, Greece, Hungary, Israel, Italy, Japan, Kazakhstan, Mexico, Moldova, Netherlands, Norway, Poland, Portugal, Romania, Russia, Serbia, Scotland, Slovakia, Slovenia, South Korea, Sweden, Spain, Switzerland, Turkey, United States, Uzbekistan

== Yevhen Rudakov Club ==
As of June 22, 2015

#	**Name**	Total	**UL**	**UC**	**EC**	**NT**	**SL**	**SC**	**FL**	**FC**
1	**Oleksandr Shovkovskyi** (Ukraine) Dynamo Kyiv	341	216	40	39	46	0	0	0	0
2	Yevhen Rudakov ~~(Soviet Union) Sudnobudivelnyk Mykolaiv~~, (Soviet Union) Dynamo Kyiv	208	0	0	25	25	143	15	0	0
3	Viktor Chanov (Soviet Union) Shakhtar Donetsk, (Soviet Union) Dynamo Kyiv, (Israel) Maccabi Tel Aviv, (Israel) Bnei Yehuda Tel Aviv, ~~(Ukraine) CSKA-Borysfen Boryspil~~	192	0	0	15	16	106	14	30	11
4	**Oleksandr Horyainov** ~~(Ukraine) Olimpik Kharkiv~~, (Ukraine) Metalist Kharkiv, (Ukraine) CSKA Kyiv, (Ukraine) Kryvbas Kryvyi Rih	182	150	15	16	1	0	0	0	0
5	**Andriy Pyatov** (Ukraine) Vorskla Poltava, (Ukraine) Shakhtar Donetsk	176	105	16	26	29	0	0	0	0
6	Vitaliy Reva ~~(Ukraine) Polihraftekhnika Oleksandriya~~, (Ukraine) CSKA Kyiv, (Ukraine) Dynamo Kyiv, (Ukraine) Tavriya Simferopol, (Ukraine) Arsenal Kyiv	164	128	25	8	3	0	0	0	0
7	Dmytro Shutkov (Soviet Union) / (Ukraine) Shakhtar Donetsk	159	122	22	10	3	1	1	0	0
8	Yuriy Dehteryov (Soviet Union) Shakhtar Donetsk	148	0	0	3	11	110	24	0	0
9	Oleksandr Tkachenko ~~(Soviet Union) Shakhtar Kadiyivka~~, (Soviet Union) Zorya Luhansk/Voroshylovgrad, (Soviet Union) Zenit Leningrad	146	0	0	3	2	119	22	0	0
10	Viktor Bannikov ~~(Soviet Union) Avanhard Zhytomyr~~, ~~(Soviet Union) Shakhtar Korostyshiv~~, ~~(Soviet Union) Desna Chernihiv~~, (Soviet Union) Dynamo Kyiv, ~~(Soviet Union) Dnipro Dnipropetrovsk~~, (Soviet Union) Torpedo Moscow	142	0	0	2	5	111	24	0	0
11	Vyacheslav Chanov (Soviet Union) Shakhtar Donetsk, (Soviet Union) Torpedo Moscow, (Soviet Union) / (Azerbaijan) Neftçi Baku, (Russia) CSKA Moscow, ~~(Germany) FSV Optik Rathenow~~	137	0	0	1	3	105	28	0	0
12	Illya Blyzniuk (Ukraine) Metalurh Zaporizhzhia, (Ukraine) Zirka Kirovohrad, (Ukraine) Dnipro Dnipropetrovsk, (Russia) Rostsielmash/FC Rostov, (Ukraine) Dynamo Kyiv, (Russia) Spartak-Alania Vladikavkaz, (Russia) Tom Tomsk, (Ukraine) Kryvbas Kryvyi Rih, (Russia) Shinnik Yaroslavl	119	60	10	1	1	0	0	44	3
13	Serhiy Dolhanskyi (Ukraine) Veres Rivne, (Ukraine) Metalist Kharkiv, (Ukraine) Chornomorets Odesa, (Ukraine) Kryvbas Kryvyi Rih, (Ukraine) Vorskla Poltava, (Ukraine) Metalurh Donetsk	117	96	13	8	0	0	0	0	0
14	Mykola Medin (Soviet Union) / (Ukraine) Dnipro Dnipropetrovsk, ~~(Ukraine) Metalurh Nikopol~~, ~~(Russia) Uralan Elista~~	115	91	18	6	0	0	0	0	0
15	Vyacheslav Kernozenko (Ukraine) Dynamo Kyiv, (Ukraine) CSKA/Arsenal Kyiv, (Ukraine) Dnipro Dnipropetrovsk, (Ukraine) Kryvbas Kryvyi Rih	113	85	15	11	2	0	4	0	0
16	Ihor Shukhovtsev (Soviet Union) Chornomorets Odesa, (Soviet Union) / (Ukraine) SKA/SK Odesa, (Ukraine) Nyva Vinnytsia, ~~(Ukraine) Nord-AM-Podillia Khmielnicki~~, (Russia) Uralmash Yekaterinburg, (Ukraine) Metalurh/Illichivets Mariupol, (Ukraine) Arsenal Kyiv, (Ukraine) Tavriya Simferopol, (Ukraine) Zorya Luhansk, (Ukraine) Metalist Kharkiv	111	94	16	1	0	0	0	0	0
17	Oleh Suslov ~~(Soviet Union) Zorya Voroshylovgrad~~, ~~(Soviet Union) SKA Odesa~~, (Soviet Union) / (Ukraine) Chornomorets Odesa, Casino/SV Austria Salzburg, ~~(Austria) FCN St. Pölten~~, Admira Vacker Mödling, ~~(Austria) SC Rabenstein~~	109	72	13	6	4	1	4	7	2
18	Viktor Hryshko (Soviet Union) Metalist Kharkiv, (Soviet Union) Dynamo Kyiv, (Soviet Union) / (Ukraine) Chornomorets Odesa, (Turkey) Trabzonspor, (Ukraine) SC Mykolaiv, ~~(Ukraine) SKA-Lotto Odesa~~, ~~(Ukraine) Dnister Ovidiopol~~	108	6	2	6	0	55	8	29	2
19	Andriy Kovtun ~~(Soviet Union) SKA Kyiv~~, ~~(Soviet Union) Guria Lanchkhuti~~, (Soviet Union) Shakhtar Donetsk, (Ukraine) Dynamo Kyiv, (Ukraine) Kryvbas Kryvyi Rih, (Ukraine) Vorskla Poltava, (Ukraine) Zakarpattia Uzhhorod	106	75	8	3	0	17	3	0	0
20	Valeriy Horodov ~~(Soviet Union) Salyut Belgorod~~, ~~(Soviet Union) Iskra Smolensk~~, (Soviet Union) / (Ukraine) Dnipro Dnipropetrovsk, (Morocco) RS Settat, (Russia) Uralmash Yekaterinburg, (Russia) Fakel Voronezh, ~~(Ukraine) Kryvbas Kryvyi Rih~~	105	13	1	2	0	51	13	21	4
20-21	Ihor Kutepov (Soviet Union) Metalist Kharkiv, (Soviet Union) / (Ukraine) Dynamo Kyiv, (Russia) Dinamo-Gazovik Tyumen, (Russia) FC Tyumen, (Russia) CSKA Moscow, (Russia) Rostselmash	105	23	5	7	1	39	10	18	2
22	Andriy Nikitin (Soviet Union) / (Ukraine) Zorya Luhansk, (Ukraine) Shakhtar Donetsk, (Ukraine) Metalurh Donetsk, (Ukraine) Illichivets Mariupol, (Azerbaijan) Simurq PFC	103	82	11	5	0	0	0	4	1
23	Yuriy Virt ~~(Ukraine) Skala Stryi~~, ~~(Ukraine) FC Lviv~~, (Ukraine) Metalurh Donetsk, (Ukraine) Shakhtar Donetsk, (Ukraine) Borysfen Boryspil	102	82	13	5	2	0	0	0	0
24	Maksym Levytskyi (Ukraine) Tavriya Simferopol, (Russia) Chernomorets Novorossiysk, (France) AS Saint-Étienne, (Russia) Spartak Moscow, (Russia) Dinamo Moscow, ~~(Russia) Sibir Novosibirsk~~, ~~(Russia) Terek Grozny~~, ~~(Russia) FC Rostov~~, ~~(Russia) Torpedo Moscow~~	102	43	9	0	4	0	0	42	4

Players still playing are shown in bold.

=== Candidates ===
These players may become members of Oleh Blokhin club soon:

Players still playing are shown in bold.

== See also ==
- Oleh Blokhin club
- Serhiy Rebrov club
- Timerlan Huseinov club
- Lev Yashin club
- Grigory Fedotov club
