= Lev Yashin Club =

Soviet and Russian goalkeepers achieving 100 or more clean sheets

Lev Yashin Club (Russian: Клуб имени Льва Яшина) is an unofficial list of Soviet and Russian football goalkeepers that have achieved 100 or more clean sheets during their professional career. This club is named after the first Soviet goalkeeper to achieve 100 clean sheets: Lev Yashin. The list was created and maintained by journalist and statistician Konstantin Yesenin (1920–1986).

== Which clean sheets are counted ==
Traditionally, Yesenin counted goals and clean sheets in the following matches:

1. Championship - goals scored in top leagues of Soviet and Russian football competitions.
2. Cup - goals in Russian and Soviet Cup and Supercup scored in the stages where top league teams participate.
3. European cups - goals scored in European Champion Clubs Cup, UEFA Champions League, UEFA Cup, Cup Winners Cup and Intertoto Cup for both home and foreign clubs. The UEFA Europa League, successor to the UEFA Cup, is currently included in the count.
4. National team - goals scored for national and olympic teams in the official matches.

== The Lev Yashin Club ==
As of 19 March 2024

Players in bold still active.

Rank	Nationality	Name	Club(s)	Total clean sheets	National league	National cup(s)	European cup(s)	National team
1	(Russia)	**Igor Akinfeev**	PFC CSKA Moscow	363	250	26	39	48
2	(Soviet Union) (Russian Soviet Federative Socialist Republic)	Rinat Dasayev	FC Spartak Moscow	229	147	19	19	44
3	(Soviet Union) (Russian Soviet Federative Socialist Republic)	Yevhen Rudakov	FC Dynamo Kyiv	206	143	14	25	24
4	(Soviet Union) (Russian Soviet Federative Socialist Republic)	Lev Yashin	FC Dynamo Moscow	203	160	18	0	25
5	(Russia)	Vyacheslav Malafeev	FC Zenit St. Petersburg	179	121	18	25	15
6	(Russia)	Sergei Ovchinnikov	FC Lokomotiv Moscow, FC Dynamo Moscow	166	136	14	9	7
7	(Soviet Union) (Georgian Soviet Socialist Republic)	Anzor Kavazashvili	FC Dinamo Tbilisi, FC Zenit Leningrad, FC Torpedo Moscow, FC Spartak Moscow	163	129	12	7	15
8	(Russia)	Aleksandr Filimonov	FC Fakel Voronezh, FC Tekstilshchik Kamyshin, FC Spartak Moscow, FC Uralan Elista, FC Moscow, FC Arsenal Tula	153	117	14	15	7
9	(Soviet Union) (Ukrainian Soviet Socialist Republic)	Viktor Chanov	FC Shakhtar Donetsk, FC Dynamo Kyiv	150	106	13	15	16
10	(Soviet Union) (Ukrainian Soviet Socialist Republic)	Yuriy Dehteryov	FC Shakhtar Donetsk	147	110	24	3	10
11	(Soviet Union) (Ukrainian Soviet Socialist Republic)	Oleksandr Tkachenko	FC Zorya Luhansk, FC Zenit Leningrad	145	119	22	3	1
12	(Russia)	Sergey Ryzhikov	FC Saturn Ramenskoye, FC Anzhi Makhachkala, FC Tom Tomsk, FC Rubin Kazan	190	152	14	26	0
13	(Soviet Union) (Ukrainian Soviet Socialist Republic)	Viktor Bannikov	FC Dynamo Kyiv, FC Torpedo Moscow	138	107	24	2	5
14	(Soviet Union) (Armenian Soviet Socialist Republic)	Alyosha Abrahamyan	FC Ararat Yerevan	138	116	15	7	0
15	(Soviet Union) (Ukrainian Soviet Socialist Republic)	Vladimir Maslachenko	FC Spartak Moscow, FC Lokomotiv Moscow	133	113	15	1	4
16	(Soviet Union) (Azerbaijan Soviet Socialist Republic)	Sergey Kramarenko	Neftchi PFK Baku, FC Chernomorets Odessa	133	116	17	0	0
17	(Soviet Union) (Russian Soviet Federative Socialist Republic) (Russia)	Stanislav Cherchesov	FC Spartak Moscow, FC Lokomotiv Moscow	131	82	10	17	22
18	(Soviet Union) (Georgian Soviet Socialist Republic)	Otar Gabelia	FC Dinamo Tbilisi, FC Torpedo Kutaisi	130	102	16	12	0
19	(Soviet Union) (Russian Soviet Federative Socialist Republic)	Vyacheslav Chanov	FC Shakhtar Donetsk, FC Torpedo Moscow, Neftchi PFK Baku, PFC CSKA Moscow	129	103	25	1	0
20	(Soviet Union) (Georgian Soviet Socialist Republic)	Ramaz Urushadze	FC Torpedo Kutaisi, FC Dinamo Tbilisi	121	113	6	0	2
21	(Soviet Union) (Ukrainian Soviet Socialist Republic)	Vladimir Pilguy	FC Dynamo Moscow, FC Kuban Krasnodar	120	84	27	4	5
22	(Soviet Union) (Uzbek Soviet Socialist Republic)	Yuri Pshenichnikov	Pakhtakor Tashkent FK, PFC CSKA Moscow	110	96	5	2	7
23	(Armenia)	Roman Berezovsky	FC Zenit St. Petersburg, FC Torpedo Moscow, FC Dynamo Moscow, FC Khimki	107	103	3	1	0
24	(Russia)	Vladimir Gabulov	FC Dynamo Moscow, FC Alania Vladikavkaz, PFC CSKA Moscow, FC Kuban Krasnodar, FC Amkar Perm, FC Anzhi Makhachkala	107	75	8	18	6
25	(Russia)	Ruslan Nigmatullin	FC KAMAZ Naberezhnye Chelny, FC Spartak Moscow, FC Lokomotiv Moscow, PFC CSKA Moscow, FC Terek Grozny	103	72	8	11	12
26	(Soviet Union) (Russian Soviet Federative Socialist Republic)	Aleksandr Podshivalov	FC Ararat Yerevan, FC Torpedo Moscow	101	93	4	4	0
27	(Soviet Union) (Lithuanian Soviet Socialist Republic)	Jonas Bauža	FK Vilnius Spartakas, PFC CSKA Moscow, FC Dynamo Moscow, FC Spartak Moscow, FC Chornomorets Odesa	100	89	11	0	0
28	(Soviet Union) (Russian Soviet Federative Socialist Republic)	Nikolai Gontar	FC Luch-Energiya Vladivostok, FC Dynamo Moscow	100	77	12	6	5

== See also ==
- Grigory Fedotov club
- Yevhen Rudakov club
- Oleh Blokhin club
- Serhiy Rebrov club
- Timerlan Huseinov club
