= Grigory Fedotov club =

High-scoring Soviet and Russian football players

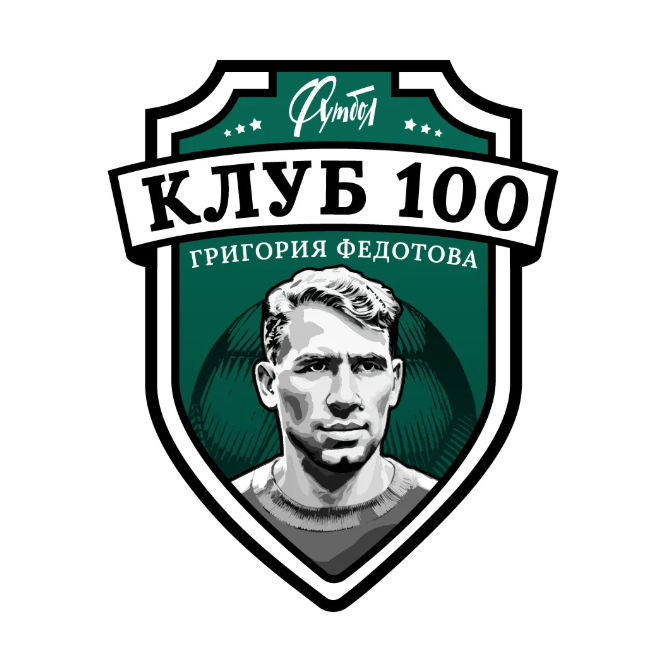
Grigory Fedorov Club logo (2025)

Grigory Fedotov Club (Russian: Клуб Григо́рия Федо́това) is a non-official list of Soviet and Russian football players that have scored 100 or more goals during their professional career. This club is named after first Soviet player to score 100 goals - Grigory Fedotov. The list was created by journalist and statistician Konstantin Yesenin and Football (Russian: Футбол) weekly magazine, though many other versions of this list exist.

== Which goals are counted ==
Yesenin counted goals scored in the following matches:

1. Championship - goals scored in top leagues of Soviet and Russian football competitions.
2. Cup - goals in Russian and Soviet Cup and Supercup scored in the stages where top league teams participate.
3. European cups - goals scored in European Champion Clubs Cup, UEFA Champions League, UEFA Cup, Cup Winners Cup and Intertoto Cup for both home and foreign clubs. Today, the UEFA Europa League, successor to the UEFA Cup, is also included in the count.
4. National team - goals scored for national and olympic teams in the official matches.
5. Spartakiads - goals in Spartakiads of Soviet people (1956 and 1979).
6. Foreign clubs - only goals scored in the top leagues of the following countries are counted:
  - Group A: Italy, Spain, Germany, England, France, Brazil, Argentina
  - Group B: Netherlands, Portugal, Turkey, Greece, Scotland, Belgium, Czech Republic, Sweden, Austria, Denmark, Uruguay, Chile, Colombia, Mexico.

Alternative versions of the list, also called "Grigory Fedotov club" by their authors, may use different rules.

== Grigory Fedotov Club as of August 28, 2011 ==
#	**Name**	Total	**National team**	**European cups**	**Championship**	**Cup**	**Spartakiads**	**Foreign clubs**
1	Oleg Blokhin Dynamo Kyiv, Vorwärts Steyr, Aris Limassol	319	44	26	211	30	4	4
2	Oleg Protasov Dnipro Dnipropetrovsk, Dynamo Kyiv, Olympiacos Piraeus, Gamba Osaka, Veria FC, Proodeftiki FC	236	29	6	125	12		64
3	Oleg Veretennikov SKA Rostov-na-Donu, FC Uralmash, FC Rotor Volgograd, Aris Thessaloniki F.C., Sokol Saratov, Lierse S.K., Lisma-Mordovia, FC Zhenis	207		17	143	27		20
4	**Aleksandr Kerzhakov** Zenit Saint Petersburg, Sevilla FC, Dynamo Moscow	186	17	24	118	19		8
5	Nikita Simonyan FC Krylya Sovetov Moscow, Spartak Moscow	183	10		145	26	2	
6	Aleksandr Ponomaryov Vuhlyk Horlivka, Traktor Stalingrad, Torpedo Moscow, Shakhtar Donetsk	168			148	20		
7	Valentin Ivanov Sr. FC Krylya Sovetov Moscow, Torpedo Moscow	166	26		124	14	2	
8	Sergei Solovyov FC Dynamo Saint Petersburg, FC Dynamo Moscow	164			145	19		
9	Sergey Rodionov Spartak Moscow, Red Star Paris	164	8	22	124	9		1
10	Alexander Mostovoi Spartak Moscow, SM Caen, RC Strasbourg, Celta Vigo, Deportivo Alavés	163	13	25	34	9		82
11	**Roman Pavlyuchenko** Rotor, Spartak Moscow, Tottenham Hotspur	161	19	18	83	7		34
12	Ramaz Shengelia Torpedo Kutaisi, Dynamo Tbilisi, Östers IF, IFK Holmsund	161	10	19	120	12		
13	Eduard Markarov FC Ararat Yerevan, PFC Neftchi	159		12	129	18		
14	Vladimir Beschastnykh Spartak Moscow, Werder Bremen, Racing de Santander, Fenerbahçe, Kuban Krasnodar, FC Dynamo Moscow, FC Oryol, FC Khimki	154	26	7	60	9		52
15	**Dmitry Loskov** FC Rostov, Lokomotiv Moscow	152	2	17	120	13		
16	Grigory Fedotov Metallurg Moscow, PFC CSKA Moscow	149			132	17		
17	Fyodor Cherenkov Spartak Moscow, Red Star Paris	149	20	15	95	19	2	
18	**Andrey Tikhonov** Titan Reutov, Spartak Moscow, Maccabi Tel Aviv FC, FC Krylya Sovetov Samara, FC Khimki	145	1	18	98	15		13
19	Galimzyan Husainov FC Krylya Sovetov Samara, Spartak Moscow	145	4	4	115	22		
20	Yury Gavrilov Iskra Moscow, FC Dynamo Moscow, Spartak Moscow, Dnipro Dnipropetrovsk, FC Lokomotiv Moscow, Asmaral	145	15	18	97	13	2	2
21	Avtandil Gogoberidze Pischevik Sukhumi, Dynamo Sukhumi, Dynamo Tbilisi	143	1		129	12	1	
22	Eduard Streltsov Torpedo Moscow	143	25	3	99	15	1	
23	Valeri Karpin Fakel Voronezh, Spartak Moscow, Real Sociedad, Valencia CF, Celta Vigo	143	17	21	28	6		71
24	**Dmitri Kirichenko** FC Rostov, CSKA Moscow, FC Moskva, Saturn Moscow Oblast	142	4	7	121	10		
25	Zaur Kaloev Spartak Tbilisi, Dynamo Tbilisi, Lokomotiv Moscow	139			118	17	4	
26	Sergey Salnikov FC Zenit Saint Petersburg, FC Dynamo Moscow, Spartak Moscow	138	11		101	24	2	
27	Boris Paichadze Dynamo Tbilisi	135			107	28		
28	Sergey Andreev FC Zorya Luhansk, SKA Rostov-na-Donu, Östers IF, Mjällby AIF, FC Rostov	135	18	2	90	13		12
29	Konstantin Beskov Metallurg Moscow, FC Dynamo Moscow	126			106	20		
30	**Sergei Semak** Asmaral Moscow, CSKA Moscow, Paris Saint-Germain, FC Moskva, Zenit St. Petersburg	124	4	8	95	16		1
31	Vsevolod Bobrov PFC CSKA Moscow, FC VVS, Spartak Moscow	124	5		99	20		
32	Georgy Kondratiev Dynamo Minsk, FC Chornomorets Odesa, Lokomotiv Moscow	124	4	11	93	13		3
33	Oleg Kopaev SKA Rostov-na-Donu	123	1		118	4		
34	Oleg Salenko Zenit St. Petersburg, Dynamo Kyiv, Valencia FC, Rangers FC	121	6	7	31	17		60
35	Igor Kolyvanov FC Dynamo Moscow, U.S. Foggia, Bologna F.C. 1909	120	15	7	42	5		51
36	**Yegor Titov** Spartak Moscow	119	7	15	87	4		6
37	Khoren Oganesyan FC Ararat Yerevan	118	8	2	93	15		
38	Viktor Voroshilov FC Krylya Sovetov Samara, Lokomotiv Moscow	117	1		108	8		
39	Andrei Yakubik FC Dynamo Moscow, FC Pakhtakor Tashkent	117		3	105	9		
40	Valery Gazzaev Dynamo Tbilisi, FC Dynamo Moscow, Lokomotiv Moscow	117	6	7	89	15		
41	Nikolay Dementyev Dynamo Leningrad, Dynamo Moscow, Spartak Moscow	115			93	22		
42	Anatoly Banishevsky PFC Neftchi	115	19		81	15		
43	David Kipiani Dynamo Tbilisi	115	9	10	79	17		
44	**Andrei Arshavin** Zenit St. Petersburg, Arsenal FC	115	16	20	51	5		23
45	**Dmitri Sychev** Lokomotiv Moscow	115	15	5	80	9		6
46	Gennady Gusarov Torpedo Moscow, FC Dynamo Moscow	113	4		92	17		
47	Slava Metreveli Torpedo Moscow, Dynamo Tbilisi	113	12		84	17		
48	Givi Nodia Torpedo Kutaisi, Dynamo Tbilisi, Lokomotiv Moscow	113	5	5	93	10		
49	Gennadi Krasnitsky FC Pakhtakor Tashkent	112	1		102	9		
50	Valentin Nikolayev PFC CSKA Moscow	111			85	26		
51	Boris Kazakov FC Krylya Sovetov Samara	111	4		100	7		
52	Oleg Terekhin Sokol Saratov, FC Dynamo Moscow, Lokomotiv Moscow, Kuban Krasnodar, Chernomorets Novorossiysk	110		8	84	18		
53	Vitali Starukhin Shakhtar Donetsk	110		3	84	23		
54	Vadim Yevtushenko Zvezda Kirovograd, Dynamo Kyiv, Dnipro Dnipropetrovsk, AIK, IK Sirius Fotboll	110	1	10	59	8		32
55	Eduard Malofeev Dynamo Minsk	109	6		100	3		
56	Aleksandr Borodyuk FC Dynamo Moscow, FC Schalke 04, SC Freiburg, Lokomotiv Moscow, Krylya Sovetov Samara	107	5	5	67	15		15
57	Anatoli Ilyin Spartak Moscow	106	16		84	5	1	
58	Berador Abduraimov FC Pakhtakor Tashkent	106			96	10		
59	Viktor Kolotov FC Rubin Kazan, Dynamo Kyiv	106	22	8	62	11	3	
60	**Igor Semshov** FC Dynamo Moscow	105	2	5	92	6		0
61	Vladimir Fedotov PFC CSKA Moscow	105	4		93	8		
62	Andrei Fedkov Terek Grozny	104	0	3	38	15		48
63	Aleksey Grinin PFC CSKA Moscow	104			83	21		
64	Yuri Chesnokov Lokomotiv Moscow, PFC CSKA Moscow	104	5	1	80	17	1	
65	Vladimir Kazachonok FC Zenit Saint Petersburg, FC Dynamo Moscow	104		5	78	15	6	
66	Aleksandr Zavarov FC Zorya Luhansk, SKA Rostov-na-Donu, Dynamo Kyiv, Juventus, AS Nancy	104	6	8	56	9		25
67	Leonid Buryak Dynamo Kyiv, Torpedo Moscow, FC Metalist Kharkiv	103	10	14	63	14	2	
68	Mykhaylo Sokolovsky Avangard Kramatorsk, SKA Kyiv, SK Chernigov, Metalurh Zaporizhzhia, Shakhtar Donetsk, Krystal Kherson	103		5	87	11		
69	Gennadiy Litovchenko Dnipro Dnipropetrovsk, Dynamo Kyiv, Olympiacos, FC Arsenal Kyiv, Admira Wacker, AEL, FC Chornomorets Odesa	103	15	11	56	9		12
70	Igor Simutenkov FC Dynamo Moscow	103	9	5	44	7		38
71	Valeri Yesipov Rotor	103	0	1	88	13		1
72	Andrei Kanchelskis FC Dynamo Kyiv, FC Shakhtar Donetsk, Manchester United F.C., Everton F.C., ACF Fiorentina, Rangers F.C., FC Saturn Moscow Oblast, FC Krylia Sovetov Samara	101	8	4	8	4		77
73	Yury Savichev Torpedo Moscow, Olympiacos, 1. FC Saarbrücken, FC St. Pauli	101	2	7	47	8		37
74	Vladimir Dyomin PFC CSKA Moscow	100			84	16		

Players still playing are shown in bold.

== See also ==
- Lev Yashin Club
- Yevhen Rudakov club
- Oleh Blokhin club
- Serhiy Rebrov club
- Timerlan Huseinov club
