= 1940 in the Soviet Union =

- Decades: 1920s; 1930s; 1940s; 1950s; 1960s
- See also: History of the Soviet Union; List of years in the Soviet Union

The following lists events that happened during 1940 in the Union of Soviet Socialist Republics.

== Incumbents ==
- General Secretary of the Communist Party of the Soviet Union — Joseph Stalin
- Chairman of the Presidium of the Supreme Soviet of the Soviet Union — Mikhail Kalinin
- Chairman of the Council of People's Commissars of the Soviet Union — Vyacheslav Molotov

== Births ==
=== January ===
- January 11 — Andres Tarand, 10th Prime Minister of Estonia
- January 17 — Mircea Snegur, 1st President of Moldova (d. 2023)
- January 18 — Alexander Almetov, Soviet and Russian ice hockey player (d. 1992)
- January 27 — Petru Lucinschi, 2nd President of Moldova
- January 30 — Leonid Polezhayev, 1st Governor of Omsk Oblast

=== February ===
- February 4 — Yuri Veksler, cinematographer (d. 1991)
- February 16 — Nikolai Kondratenko, 5th Governor of Krasnodar Krai (d. 2013)
- February 17 — Alexei Fridman, Soviet and Russian physicist (d. 2010)
- February 19 — Saparmurat Niyazov, 1st President of Turkmenistan (d. 2006)

=== March ===
- March 4 — Vladimir Morozov, sprint canoeist (d. 2023)
- March 7 — Viktor Savinykh, cosmonaut
- March 8 — Viktor Kalashnikov, 1st Governor of Voronezh Oblast (d. 2023)
- March 9 — Larisa Golubkina, actress
- March 16 — Vagif Mustafazadeh, jazz pianist and composer (d. 1979)
- March 20 — Igor Ryomin, football player (d. 1991)

=== May ===
- May 4 — Viktor Getmanov, football player (d. 1995)
- May 9 — Inna Gulaya, theatre and cinema actress (d. 1990)
- May 15 — Svetlana Svetlichnaya, Soviet and Russian actress
- May 24 — Joseph Brodsky, poet and essayist (d. 1996)
- May 28 — Valentin Gerasimov, 1st Governor of Kurgan Oblast

=== June ===
- June 8 — Vladimir Semyonov, 2nd Head of Karachay-Cherkessia
- June 13 — Valery Sudarenkov, 3rd Governor of Kaluga Oblast
- June 20 — Lyudmila Marchenko, Soviet and Russian film actress (d. 1997)
- June 26 — Vyacheslav Ionov, Soviet and Russian sprint canoeist (d. 2012)
- June 28 — Alina Vedmid, politician and agronomist (d. 2008)
- June 29 — Vyacheslav Artyomov, composer

=== July ===
- July 6 — Nursultan Nazarbayev, 1st President of Kazakhstan
- July 14 — Utkir Sultonov, 2nd Prime Minister of Uzbekistan (d. 2015)
- July 19 — Anzor Kavazashvili, football goalkeeper

=== August ===
- August 4 — Jamshed Karimov, 5th Prime Minister of Tajikistan
- August 6 — Mukhu Aliyev, 2nd Head of the Republic of Dagestan
- August 15 — Aleksandr Surikov, 3rd Governor of Altai Krai
- August 20 — Musa Geshaev, Chechen poet (d. 2014)
- August 31 — Gennady Vasilyev, Soviet and Russian film director (d. 1999)

=== September ===
- September 14 — Gennady Kuptsov, 1st Governor of Lipetsk Oblast
- September 18 — Lyudmila Davletova, engineer, technologist and stateswoman

=== October ===
- October 5
  - Rein Aun, Estonian decathlete and coach (d. 1995)
  - Viktor Pavlov, actor (d. 2006)
- October 9 — Valery Nosik, actor (d. 1995)
- October 18 — Aleksandr Starovoitov, Soviet and Russian security services and academic officer (d. 2021)
- October 20
  - Hasan Hasanov, 1st Prime Minister of Azerbaijan
  - Viktor Barannikov, 10th Minister of Interior Affairs of the Soviet Union (d. 1995)

=== November ===
- November 21 — Natalia Makarova, ballerina

=== December ===
- December 22 — Doku Zavgayev, Soviet and Russian diplomat and politician
- December 24 — Saylau Serikov, Deputy Minister of Internal Affairs of the Kazakh SSR (d. 1991)

== Deaths ==
- January 27 — Isaac Babel, writer, journalist playwright and literary translator (b. 1894)
- February 2
  - Vsevolod Meyerhold, theatre director, actor and theatrical producer (b. 1874)
  - Robert Eikhe, politician (b. 1890)
  - Mikhail Koltsov, journalist, revolutionary and NKVD agent (b. 1898)
- February 4
  - Nikolai Yezhov, Head of NKVD (b. 1895)
  - Mikhail Frinovsky, secret police official (b. 1898)
- March 10 — Mikhail Bulgakov, writer, medical doctor and playwright (b. 1891)
- August 21 — Leon Trotsky, politician and political theorist (b. 1879)
- December 2 — Nikolai Koltsov, biologist (b. 1872)

== See also ==
- 1940 in fine arts of the Soviet Union
- List of Soviet films of 1940
