= Football (magazine) =

Russian sports magazine

- Editor: Denis Vdovin
- Former editors: Pyotr Kamenchenko
- Categories: Association football
- Frequency: Weekly
- Format: Magazine
- First issue: May 29, 1960; 66 years ago
- Country: Russia
- Language: Russian
- Website: ftbl.ru
- OCLC: 1043646856

Football (Russian: Футбол) was a weekly magazine about football and hockey, published since May 1960 until June 2019. It was a main informational partner of the Football Federation of the Soviet Union.

Since 1964 it was conducting polls for the main annual footballers' honours known as the Soviet Footballer of the Year and later Footballer of the Year in Russia. It is a media sponsor of the Russian Football Union and the Professional Football League. Since January 2007, in each room are printed posters of teams and players.

== History ==
The first Football weekly issue was published May 29, 1960 as a Sunday magazine of Sovetsky Sport. Before that, the chairman of Football Federation of the Soviet Union Valentin Granatkin on one of said plenums of the alleged publication of the journal.

In 1967, the weekly was renamed the Football-Ice Hockey. In an editorial column of this action was justified by the increased popularity of the sport. During perestroyka in one of the articles it has been written that the reason for the name change was the desire of one of the approximate Leonid Brezhnev. The publication came out at 16 black and white pages.

At the initiative of Konstantin Yesenin was established Grigory Fedotov club. In May 2015 the weekly renamed Football-Ice Hockey, published information and statistical annex 90 minutes.

== The editors ==
- Martyn Merzhanov (1960-1966)
- Lev Filatov (1966-1983)
- Gennady Radchuk (1983-1984)
- Viktor Ponedelnik (1984-1990)
- Oleg Kucherenko (1990-2004)
- Pyotr Kamenchenko (2004-2013)
- Denis Vdovin (2013-2019)

== Interesting facts ==
In the American film Red Dawn (1984) on the counter placed weekly No. 21 for the year 1983 (the scene visits teens shop in the city, occupied by the Soviet army).
