= Perevalov =

Perevalov (Russian: Перевалов, from перевал meaning mountain pass) is a Russian masculine surname, its feminine counterpart is Perevalova. Notable people with the surname include:

- Mikhail Perevalov (1930–1995), Soviet football player
