= Viktor Khokhliuk =

Ukrainian journalist

Viktor Khokhljuk Віктор Хохлюк
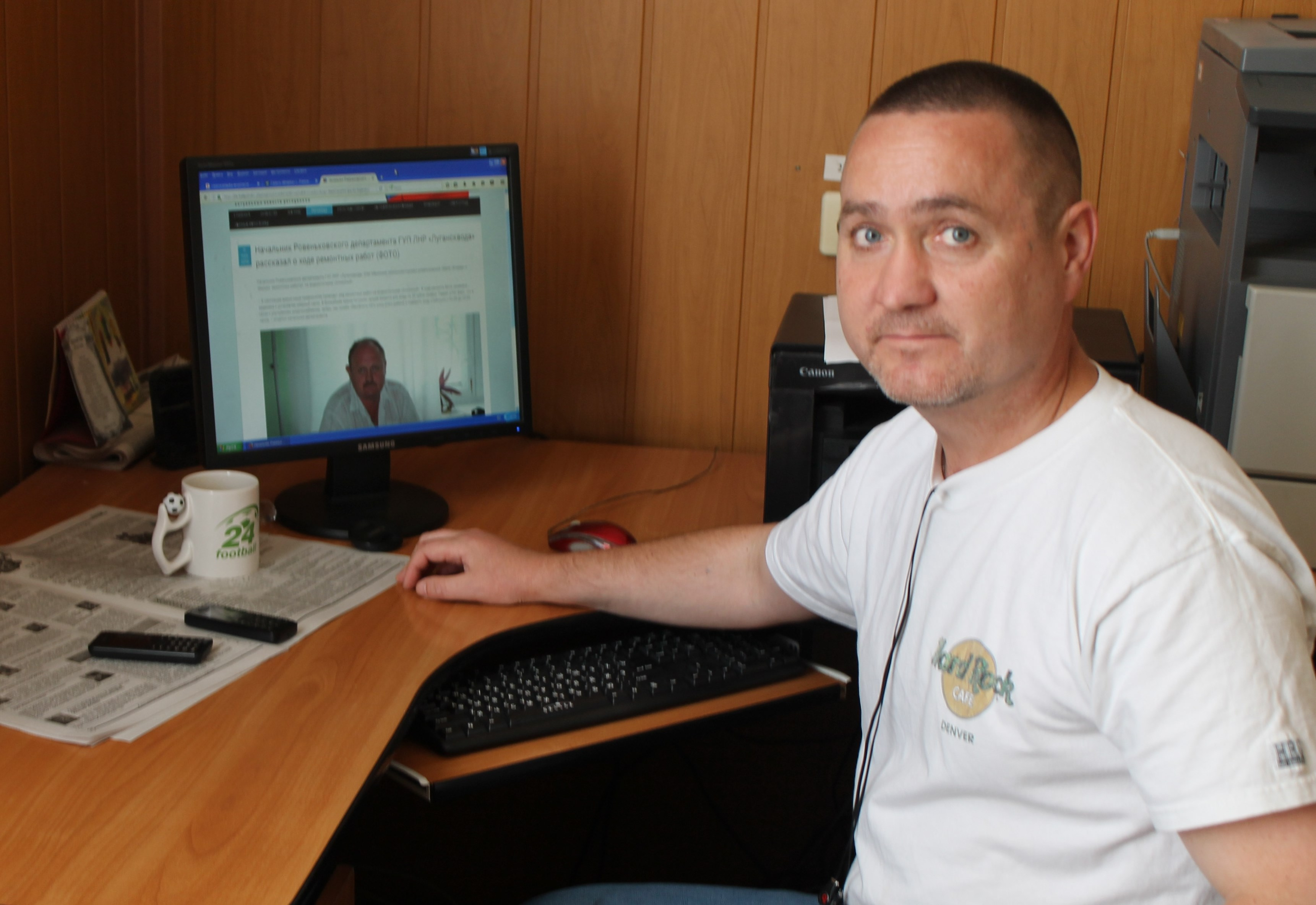
- Viktor Khokhljuk at the workplace in the editorial office of the newspaper
- Born: 21 March 1971 (age 55); Rovenky, Luhansk Oblast, Ukraine
- Occupation: journalist
- Employer: "Kazakhstan football"

Viktor Khokhliuk (Ukrainian: Віктор Миколайович Хохлюк) (born 21 March 1971 in Rovenky, Luhansk Oblast, Ukrainian SSR) is a former Ukrainian journalist at the Kazakhstan edition of "Kazakhstan football", and a sports writer-biographer.

== Biography ==
He graduated from the faculty of economics of the University of Berdiansk management and business.

Since 1983, deals with the history and statistics of Ukrainian football. His articles have appeared in publications, "Tavria-sports", "Ukrainian football", "Soccer review", "Football + sporting news", etc. He is the author of symbolic clubs footballers scorer for Ukrainian Oleh Blokhin club, foreign snipers Ukrainian teams Club Maxim Shatskikh for goalkeepers Yevhen Rudakov club. He collected and systematized the statistics for many players from the former Soviet Union and Ukraine, the main area – statistics goalies and scorers.

During the 2012 European Championship has worked with renowned football experts: Yuriy Dehteryov, Yuri Dmitrulin, Oleksandr Holovko, Sergei Kandaurov, Yevhen Levchenko, Viktor Leonenko, Vasyl Rats and other notable players.

A relative of the Russian scientist-mathematician Vitaly Khokhliuk.

Viktor Khokhliuk published several books about football, one of which in 2012 was recognized as the best sports book of the year in Ukraine. His books are devoted to sports biographies of football players.

In July 2018, the Moscow publishing house published a book, Viktor Khokhliuk "Our football legends. Goleadors of the former USSR in football fights abroad". Then he gave the interview to the Berlin edition of the Berlin edition of DG NEVS, in which he told about his book.

In November 2019, he won the international competition of sports journalists held in Moscow. The competition was represented by the publication from Uzbekistan «Interfootball».

In March 2020, Eduard Streltsov, the genius of Russian football, published a book.

== Published books ==
- "Scorers of Ukraine": Rovenky. 2011. ISBN 978-966-534-344-8 (in Russian)
- "Club of Ukrainian scorers named after Oleg Blokhin". Luhansk. 2011. ISBN 978-966-15-8931-4 (in Russian)
- "Goalkeepers". Luhansk. 2012. ISBN 978-966-15-8934-5 (in Russian)
- "Goleadors": Luhansk. 2012. ISBN 978-966-15-8934-5 (in Russian)
- "Our football legends. Goleadors of the former USSR in football fights abroad". Moscow. 2018. ISBN 978-5-604-10716-4 (in Russian)
- "Eduard Streltsov the genius of russian football". Moscow. 2020. ISBN 978-5-6043989-2-0 (in Russian)

== Honors ==
- Winner of "Best sports book of the year" in a competition held Ukrainian Sports Press Association: 2012.
- The winner in the Golden Pens category of sports journalists of Ukraine: 2013.
- Winner of the IX All-Russian festival-competition of sports journalism «Energy of victories»: 2019.
