= Maksim Shatskikh =

Uzbekistani footballer

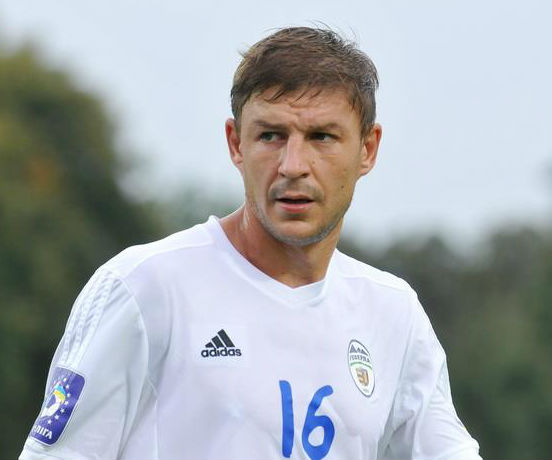
- Shatskikh playing for Hoverla Uzhhorod in 2014

Personal information
- Full name: Maksim Aleksandrovich Shatskikh
- Date of birth: 30 August 1978 (age 48)
- Place of birth: Tashkent, Uzbek SSR, Soviet Union
- Height: 1.87 m (6 ft 2 in)
- Position: Striker

Team information
- Current team: Asia Talas (head coach

Youth career
- 1994: MHSK Tashkent
- 1995: Chilanzar Tashkent

Senior career*
Years	Team	Apps	(Gls)
1996	Sokol Saratov	12	(0)
1996	Torpedo Volzhsky	4	(0)
1997	Lada Togliatti	22	(9)
1998	SOYUZ-Gazprom Izhevsk	27	(9)
1999	Baltika Kaliningrad	19	(5)
1999–2009	Dynamo Kyiv	215	(97)
1999–2004	→ Dynamo-2 Kyiv	21	(7)
2001	→ Dynamo-3 Kyiv	2	(1)
2009	Lokomotiv Astana	15	(8)
2010–2013	Arsenal Kyiv	83	(21)
2013	Chornomorets Odesa	6	(0)
2013	Arsenal Kyiv	12	(1)
2014–2015	Hoverla Uzhhorod	25	(5)
2015–2016	Rukh Vynnyky (amateurs)		
Total		463	(158)

International career
1999–2014	Uzbekistan	61	(34)

Managerial career
- 2016–2017: Dynamo Kyiv (U-19 team assistant)
- 2017–2019: Dynamo Kyiv (assistant)
- 2019–2021: Rotor Volgograd (assistant)
- 2022: Pakhtakor Tashkent (sporting director)
- 2022–2024: Pakhtakor Tashkent
- 2024–2025: Pakhtakor Tashkent (sports coordinator)
- 2025: Andijon
- 2025–: Asia Talas
- * Club domestic league appearances and goals

Maksim Aleksandrovich Shatskikh (born 30 August 1978) is an Uzbekistani professional football coach and a former player who coaches FC Asia Talas in the Kyrgyz Premier League.

A prolific striker, he is widely regarded as one of the best Uzbekistani players of all time and was the top goalscorer of the national team with 34 goals in 61 games from 2010 to 2022. He spent a decade playing for Dynamo Kyiv from 1999 to 2009.

On 28 July 1999, Shatskikh became the first Asian player to score in the UEFA Champions League and is only the second Uzbekistani player, after Mirjalol Kasymov, to score in UEFA football competitions. At international level, he played in three AFC Asian Cups for Uzbekistan, helping them to fourth place in 2011.

He last played for Rukh Vynnyky. On 8 April 2016, it was announced that he ended his playing career and became a coaching staff of the Dynamo football academy.

His brother Oleg Shatskikh is also a former footballer.

== Club career ==
=== Dynamo Kyiv ===
After playing for clubs in Uzbekistan and Russia in his earlier career he was signed by Ukrainian Premier League's Dynamo Kyiv as a replacement for Andriy Shevchenko, who was acquired by A.C. Milan in 1999. In his first season at Dynamo, he scored two goals in a 3–2 win over Karpaty Lviv to clinch Dynamo's 8th consecutive league title. He was labeled the "next Shevchenko" in the media.

In his debut season for Dynamo Kyiv, he won the Ukrainian Premier League and became Ukrainian Premier League top scorer, scoring 20 goals. In the 2002–03 season, when he scored 22 goals to equal Serhii Rebrov's record haul of 1997–98 while also playing for Kyiv, Shatskikh scored 5 goals in his debut UEFA Champions League season 1999–2000. On 28 July 1999, he scored his first goal in the Champions League in a match against Žalgiris Vilnius. With Kyiv, Shatskikh managed to play 9 seasons in the UEFA Champions League, scoring 11 goals.

=== Arsenal Kyiv ===
After spending the 2009 season with Lokomotiv Astana in the Kazakhstan Premier League he returned to Kyiv, where he was signed by FC Arsenal Kyiv during the winter break. During his stay with Arsenal Kyiv, Shatskikh scored his 100th league goal. On 7 April 2010, the president of Arsenal Kyiv presented Shatskikh the Golden Ball award for scoring his 100th goal in the Ukrainian Premier League against Metalurh Zaporizhzhia. Arsenal president Vadym Rabinovych said that he had already ordered another Golden Ball for Shatskikh containing more gold for his future 200th goal in the Ukrainian Premier League.

At the start of the 2013–14 season, Shatskikh joined Arsenal Kyiv from fellow Ukrainian side Chornomorets Odesa.

=== Hoverla ===
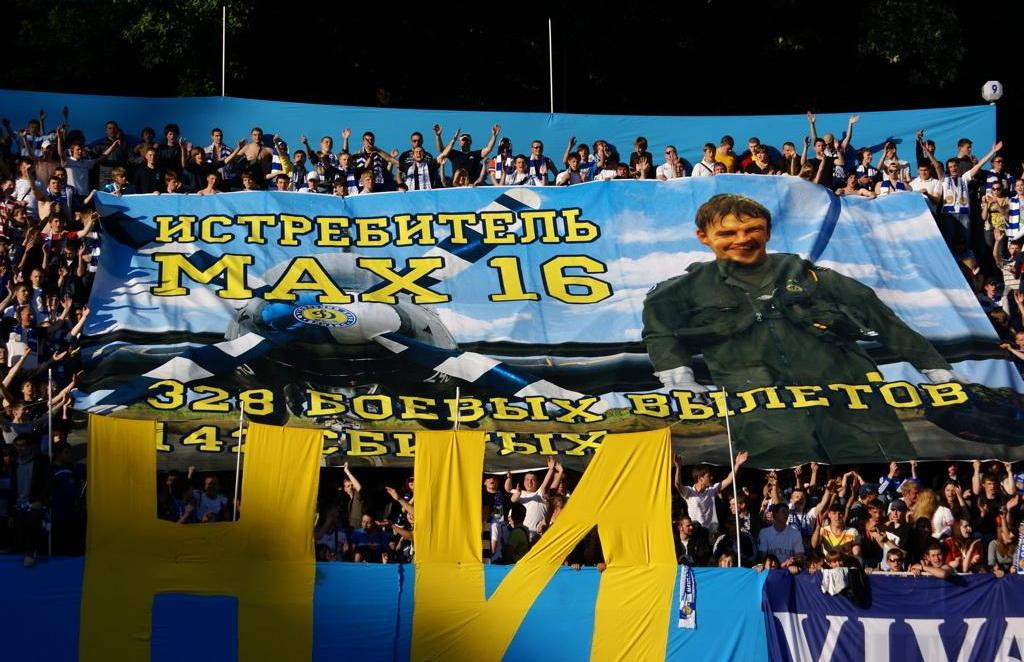
Maksim Shatskikh banner on 26 May 2009

On 30 December 2013, Shatskikh signed a 2.5-year contract with Hoverla Uzhhorod. On 27 July 2014, in Ukrainian Premier League match Hoverla Uzhhorod- Karpaty Lviv finished by draw 2–2, Shatskikh scored the first goal for the Hoverla side in the match and his 122nd in Ukrainian Premier League.

On 23 August 2014, in Ukrainian Cup away match against Cherkaskyi Dnipro Hoverla won by 2–1 and Shatskikh scored in the 67th minute the second goal of his team. After this match his total goals in the Ukrainian Cup reached 24 goals (as of 23 August 2014) and he became the 2nd best goalscorer of the tournament after Andriy Vorobey with 25 goals.

He is one of the highest goalscorer in the history of the Ukrainian Premier League with 124 goals. Shatskikh scored his 124th goal on 4 October 2014 in a match against Zorya Luhansk lost by Hoverla with 2–1. He is also member of Oleh Blokhin club with 171 goals (as of 4 October 2014).

At the end of the 2014–15 season Shatskikh left the club, while under a contract and joined an amateur club from Lviv until the end of 2015. On 10 May 2016, he filed a case to Lausanne (Court of Arbitration for Sport) against Hoverla Uzhhorod administration for failure to pay him indebted salary. During the 2015–16 season Hoverla already was fined and had points deducted for not paying players' salaries on the decision of the Football Federation of Ukraine, yet according to Shatskikh his personal case that was filed in October 2015 was not yet reviewed by April 2016 and could stretch out for 10 years.

== International career ==
Known since his performance at young age, he was available to represent for Uzbekistan and Russia. Immediately, he chose the former.

Shatskih was among the three best Asian players in 2005. On 13 October 2007, he scored 5 goals against Taiwan. On 2 June 2008, he scored a goal for Uzbekistan during a 7–3 win over Singapore in a World Cup 2010 qualification game and became joint top scorer for the national team with Mirjalol Kasymov. On 15 October 2008, he scored against Japan as well, thus becoming the all-time top scorer for his side. Another famous goal came against Iran in the 2014 WCQs effectively sealing Irans fate and ensuring the Uzbekis reaching the playoffs.

On 29 May 2014, Shatskikh played his farewell match for the national team in a friendly against Oman. He capped 61 matches for national team, scoring 34 goals. He remained Uzbekistan's leading national team goalscorer until June 2023, when Eldor Shomurodov broke his record.

== Coaching career ==
Shatskikh was appointed head coach of newly founded Kyrgyz Premier League club Asia Talas in November 2025.

== Personal life ==
He is a naturalized citizen of Ukraine subsequently during his late career.

His daughter Kristina is married to current Dynamo Kyiv midfielder, Mykola Shaparenko.

== Career statistics ==
=== Club ===
Appearances and goals by club, season and competition
Club	Season	League		Cup		Europe		Super Cup		Total	
Club	Season	Apps	Goals	Apps	Goals	Apps	Goals	Apps	Goals	Apps	Goals
Sokol Saratov	1996	12	0	1	0	–		–		13	0
Torpedo Volzhsky	1996	4	0	–		–		–		4	0
Lada Togliatti	1997	22	9	–		–		–		22	9
SOYUZ-Gazprom	1998	27	9	–		–		–		27	9
Baltika Kaliningrad	1999	19	5	1	3	–		–		20	8
Dynamo Kyiv	1999–2000	25	20	4	4	15	5	–		44	29
Dynamo Kyiv	2000–01	14	3	–		7	2	–		21	5
Dynamo Kyiv	2001–02	17	7	6	5	1	0	–		24	12
Dynamo Kyiv	2002–03	29	22	7	5	12	5	–		48	32
Dynamo Kyiv	2003–04	21	10	3	3	8	3	–		32	16
Dynamo Kyiv	2004–05	29	11	5	0	8	1	–		42	12
Dynamo Kyiv	2005–06	22	5	2	0	2	1	1	0	27	6
Dynamo Kyiv	2006–07	29	9	3	2	10	5	1	0	43	16
Dynamo Kyiv	2007–08	23	10	6	3	7	1	–		36	14
Dynamo Kyiv	2008–09	6	0	1	0	3	0	1	0	11	0
Dynamo Kyiv	Total	215	97	37	22	73	23	3	0	328	142
Lokomotiv Astana	2009	15	8	1	1	–		–		16	9
Arsenal Kyiv	2009–10	13	4	–		–		–		13	4
Arsenal Kyiv	2010–11	28	9	3	0	–		–		31	9
Arsenal Kyiv	2011–12	24	3	3	1	–		–		27	4
Arsenal Kyiv	2012–13	18	5	2	0	2	0	–		22	5
Arsenal Kyiv	Total	83	21	8	1	2	0	–		93	22
Chornomorets Odesa	2012–13	6	0	1	0	–		–		7	0
Arsenal Kyiv	2013–14	12	1	1	0	–		–		13	1
Hoverla Uzhhorod	2013–14	7	2	–		–		–		7	2
Hoverla Uzhhorod	2014–15	18	3	3	1	–		–		21	4
Hoverla Uzhhorod	Total	25	5	3	1	–		–		28	6
Career total		440	155	53	28	75	23	3	0	571	206

=== International ===
Appearances and goals by national team and year
National team	Year	Apps	Goals
Uzbekistan	1999	3	6
Uzbekistan	2000	4	2
Uzbekistan	2001	5	1
Uzbekistan	2003	4	1
Uzbekistan	2004	3	2
Uzbekistan	2005	7	3
Uzbekistan	2006	5	4
Uzbekistan	2007	5	8
Uzbekistan	2008	9	3
Uzbekistan	2009	2	0
Uzbekistan	2010	4	2
Uzbekistan	2011	9	2
Uzbekistan	2014	1	0
Total		61	34

Scores and results list Uzbekistan's goal tally first, score column indicates score after each Shatskikh goal.

List of international goals scored by Maksim Shatskikh
No.	Date	Venue	Opponent	Score	Result	Competition
1	9 June 1999	Samarkand, Uzbekistan	Azerbaijan		5–1	Friendly
2	9 June 1999	Samarkand, Uzbekistan	Azerbaijan		5–1	Friendly
3	9 June 1999	Samarkand, Uzbekistan	Azerbaijan		5–1	Friendly
4	21 November 1999	Abu Dhabi, United Arab Emirates	Bangladesh		6–0	2000 AFC Asian Cup qualification
5	21 November 1999	Abu Dhabi, United Arab Emirates	Bangladesh		6–0	2000 AFC Asian Cup qualification
6	27 November 1999	Abu Dhabi, United Arab Emirates	United Arab Emirates		1–0	2000 AFC Asian Cup qualification
7	8 October 2000	Tashkent, Uzbekistan	Turkmenistan		3–0	Friendly
8	8 October 2000	Tashkent, Uzbekistan	Turkmenistan		3–0	Friendly
9	8 September 2001	Tashkent, Uzbekistan	Oman		5–0	2002 FIFA World Cup qualification
10	8 November 2003	Tashkent, Uzbekistan	Thailand		3–0	2004 AFC Asian Cup qualification
11	13 October 2004	Amman, Jordan	Iraq		2–1	2006 FIFA World Cup qualification
12	17 November 2004	Tashkent, Uzbekistan	Chinese Taipei		6–1	2006 FIFA World Cup qualification
13	3 June 2005	Tashkent, Uzbekistan	South Korea		1–1	2006 FIFA World Cup qualification
14	17 August 2005	Tashkent, Uzbekistan	Kuwait		3–2	2006 FIFA World Cup qualification
15	8 October 2005	Tashkent, Uzbekistan	Bahrain		1–1	2006 FIFA World Cup qualification
16	22 February 2006	Tashkent, Uzbekistan	Bangladesh		5–0	2007 AFC Asian Cup qualification
17	22 February 2006	Tashkent, Uzbekistan	Bangladesh		5–0	2007 AFC Asian Cup qualification
18	16 August 2006	Tashkent, Uzbekistan	Hong Kong		2–2	2007 AFC Asian Cup qualification
19	11 October 2006	Dhaka, Bangladesh	Bangladesh		4–0	2007 AFC Asian Cup qualification
20	14 July 2007	Kuala Lumpur, Malaysia	Malaysia		5–0	2007 AFC Asian Cup Group Stage
21	14 July 2007	Kuala Lumpur, Malaysia	Malaysia		5–0	2007 AFC Asian Cup Group Stage
22	18 July 2007	Kuala Lumpur, Malaysia	China		3–0	2007 AFC Asian Cup Group Stage
23	13 October 2007	Tashkent, Uzbekistan	Chinese Taipei		9–0	2010 FIFA World Cup qualification
24	13 October 2007	Tashkent, Uzbekistan	Chinese Taipei		9–0	2010 FIFA World Cup qualification
25	13 October 2007	Tashkent, Uzbekistan	Chinese Taipei		9–0	2010 FIFA World Cup qualification
26	13 October 2007	Tashkent, Uzbekistan	Chinese Taipei		9–0	2010 FIFA World Cup qualification
27	13 October 2007	Tashkent, Uzbekistan	Chinese Taipei		9–0	2010 FIFA World Cup qualification
28	26 March 2008	Tashkent, Uzbekistan	Saudi Arabia		3–0	2010 FIFA World Cup qualification
29	2 June 2008	Singapore, Singapore	Singapore		7–3	2010 FIFA World Cup qualification
30	15 October 2008	Saitama, Japan	Japan		1–1	2010 FIFA World Cup qualification
31	7 September 2010	Tallinn, Estonia	Estonia		3–3	Friendly
32	12 October 2010	Riffa, Bahrain	Bahrain		4–2	Friendly
33	12 January 2011	Doha, Qatar	Kuwait		2–1	2011 AFC Asian Cup Group Stage
34	2 September 2011	Tursunzoda, Tajikistan	Tajikistan		1–0	2014 FIFA World Cup Qualification

== Honours ==
=== Player ===
Dynamo Kyiv

- Ukrainian Championship: 1999–2000, 2000–01, 2002–03, 2003–04, 2006–07, 2008–09
- Ukrainian Cup: 2000, 2003, 2005, 2006, 2007
- Ukrainian Super Cup: 2004, 2006, 2007
- Commonwealth of Independent States Cup: 2002

Uzbekistan

- Asian Cup fourth place: 2011

=== Manager ===
Pakhtakor

- Uzbekistan Super League: 2022

Individual

- Uzbekistan Footballer of the Year: 2003, 2005, 2006, 2007
- Ukrainian Premier League top scorer: 1999–2000, 2002–03
- Ukrainian Cup top scorer: 1999–2000, 2001–02, 2002–03
- Serhiy Rebrov club: 124 goals
- Oleh Blokhin club: 171 goals
