= 1940 in fine arts of the Soviet Union =

The year 1940 was marked by many events that left an imprint on the history of Soviet and Russian Fine Arts.

== Events ==
- February 18 — The Fifth Exhibition of works of Leningrad artists was opened in the halls of the Leningrad Union of Artists.
- March 30 — The Sixth Exhibition of works of Leningrad artists was opened in the halls of the Leningrad Union of Artists.
- In Leningrad was opened the Memorial Apartment of the artist Isaak Brodsky, in which he lived for the past 15 years. It exhibited a collection of paintings and drawings by Russian artists, donated to the Soviet State the artist's family after his death.

== Births ==
- June 7 — Valery Lednev (Russian: Леднев Валерий Александрович), People's Artist of the RSFSR.

== Deaths ==
- May 31 — Aleksei Kravchenko (Russian: Кравченко Алексей Ильич), Russian Soviet graphic artist (b. 1889).
- June 5 — Vasily Kozlov (Russian: Козлов Василий Васильевич), Russian Soviet sculptor (b. 1887).
- December 23 — Filipp Malyavin (Russian: Малявин Филипп Андреевич), Russian Soviet painter (b. 1869).
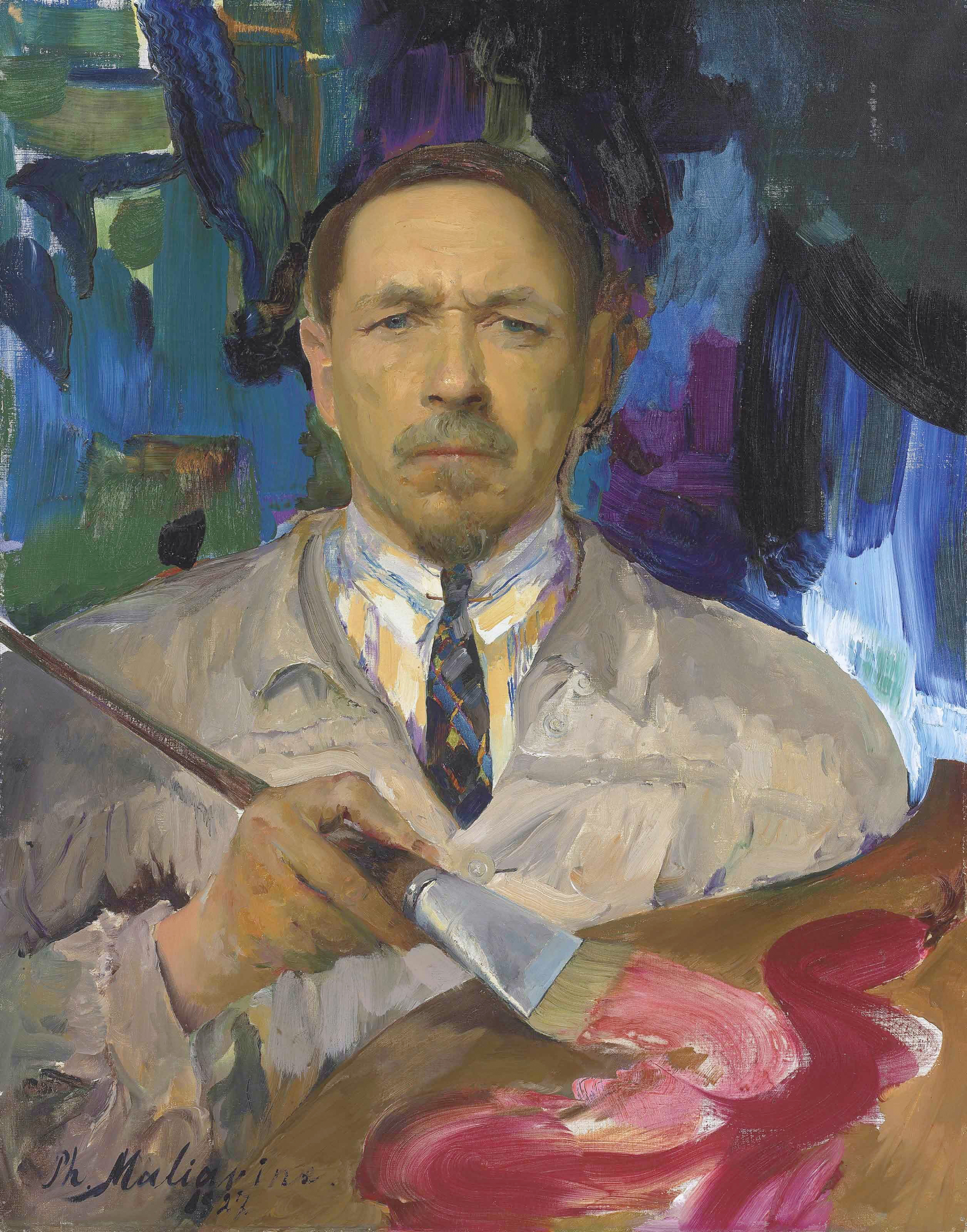
Filipp Malyavin

== See also ==
- List of Russian artists
- List of painters of Leningrad Union of Artists
- Saint Petersburg Union of Artists
- Russian culture
- 1940 in the Soviet Union

== Sources ==
- 5-я Выставка произведений ленинградских художников. Живопись, скульптура, графика. Л., ЛССХ, 1940.
- 6-я Выставка произведений ленинградских художников. Живопись, скульптура, графика. Л., ЛССХ, 1940.
- Artists of Peoples of the USSR. Biobibliography Dictionary. Vol. 1. Moscow, Iskusstvo, 1970.
- Artists of Peoples of the USSR. Biobibliography Dictionary. Vol. 2. Moscow, Iskusstvo, 1972.
- Directory of Members of Union of Artists of USSR. Volume 1,2. Moscow, Soviet Artist Edition, 1979.
- Directory of Members of the Leningrad branch of the Union of Artists of Russian Federation. Leningrad, Khudozhnik RSFSR, 1980.
- Artists of Peoples of the USSR. Biobibliography Dictionary. Vol. 4 Book 1. Moscow, Iskusstvo, 1983.
- Directory of Members of the Leningrad branch of the Union of Artists of Russian Federation. Leningrad, Khudozhnik RSFSR, 1987.
- Персональные и групповые выставки советских художников. 1917-1947 гг. М., Советский художник, 1989.
- Artists of peoples of the USSR. Biobibliography Dictionary. Vol. 4 Book 2. Saint Petersburg: Academic project humanitarian agency, 1995.
- Link of Times: 1932 – 1997. Artists – Members of Saint Petersburg Union of Artists of Russia. Exhibition catalogue. Saint Petersburg, Manezh Central Exhibition Hall, 1997.
- Matthew C. Bown. Dictionary of 20th Century Russian and Soviet Painters 1900-1980s. London, Izomar, 1998.
- Vern G. Swanson. Soviet Impressionism. – Woodbridge, England: Antique Collectors' Club, 2001.
- Sergei V. Ivanov. Unknown Socialist Realism. The Leningrad School. Saint-Petersburg, NP-Print Edition, 2007. ISBN 5901724216, ISBN 9785901724217.
- Anniversary Directory graduates of Saint Petersburg State Academic Institute of Painting, Sculpture, and Architecture named after Ilya Repin, Russian Academy of Arts. 1915 – 2005. Saint Petersburg, Pervotsvet Publishing House, 2007.
