= Oleg Morozov (footballer, born 1937) =

Soviet footballer

Personal information
- Full name: Oleg Andreyevich Morozov
- Date of birth: 17 March 1937
- Place of birth: Sinyavino, Leningrad Oblast, Russian SFSR, Soviet Union
- Date of death: 1 April 2006 (aged 69)
- Position: Forward

Senior career*
Years	Team	Apps	(Gls)
1957	Burevestnik Leningrad		
1957–1960	Zenit Leningrad		
1961	Admiralteyets Leningrad		
1962	Dynamo Leningrad		
1963	Trudovye Rezervy Lugansk		

International career
1958	USSR	1	
- * Club domestic league appearances and goals

Oleg Andreyevich Morozov (Russian: Оле́г Андре́евич Моро́зов; 17 March 1937 – 1 April 2006) was a Soviet association football player.

== International career ==
Morozov played his only game for the Soviet national football team on 30 August 1958 in a friendly match against Czechoslovakia.
