= Viktor Lysenko =

Ukrainian footballer

Personal information
- Full name: Viktor Andriyovych Lysenko
- Date of birth: 1947
- Place of birth: Mykolaiv, USSR
- Date of death: 27 July 2003 (aged 55–56)
- Place of death: Mykolaiv, Ukraine
- Position: Defender

Youth career
- DYuSSh-3 Mykolaiv

Senior career*
Years	Team	Apps	(Gls)
1964–1965	Sudostroitel Mykolaiv		
1965–1971	FC Chornomorets Odesa	100	(3)

International career
1969	USSR	1	(0)
- * Club domestic league appearances and goals

Viktor Andriyovych (or Andreyevich) Lysenko (Russian: Виктор Андреевич Лысенко; Ukrainian: Віктор Андрійович Лисенко; born 1947 in Mykolaiv; died 27 July 2003 in Mykolaiv) was a Soviet football player.

== International career ==
Lysenko played his only game for USSR on 20 February 1969 in a friendly against Colombia.
