= Lyudmila Davletova =

- Людмила Давлетова
- Born: 18 September 1940 (age 85); Komsomolsky, Sokuluk District, Frunze Region, Kirghiz Soviet Socialist Republic, Soviet Union
- Occupations: Engineer; Stateswoman; Technologist
- Years active: 1957–1998
- Awards: Order of the Badge of Honour; Order of the Red Banner of Labour

Lyudmila Yelmatovna Davletova (Kazakh: Людмила Елматовна Давлетова; Russian: Людмила Ельматовна Давлетова; born 18 September 1940) is a Soviet and Kazakh engineer, technologist and stateswoman. She was a member of the Central Committee of the Communist Party of the Soviet Union and a deputy of the Supreme Soviet of the Kazakh Soviet Socialist Republic. Davletova is a recipient of the Order of the Badge of Honour and the Order of the Red Banner of Labour.

== Early life and education ==
Davletova was born in the village of Komsomolsky in the Sokuluk District, Frunze Region, Kirghiz Soviet Socialist Republic on 18 September 1940. She was a 1964 graduate of the Tashkent Institute of Textile and Light Industry, specialising in sewing production engineer-technologist and graduated from the Academy of Social Sciences under the CPSU Central Committee specialising in party and Soviet construction in 1988.

== Career ==
In 1957, Davletova began working as a farm worker at the Alamedin breeding state farm, as a factory construction worker, as a seamstress apprentice and a seamstress at the 40th Anniversary of October Factory in Frunze. Beginning in 1964 at the Almaty garment factory named after May 1, she worked as a technologist, shift supervisor, senior engineer, head of the personnel training department, head of the cutting shop, head of the personnel department and was deputy director of the factory for personnel.

Davletova became a member of the Communist Party of the Soviet Union (CPSU) in 1968, and began working in economic and trade union work in 1971. She was appointed secretary of the Republican trade union committee of workers of the textile and light industry of the Kazakh SSR and became director of the Almaty production garment association named after May 1 in 1973. From 1982 to 1983, Davletova served as deputy minister of Light Industry of the Kazakh SSR and was Head of the Light Industry and Consumer Goods Department of the Central Committee of the Communist Party of Kazakhstan from 1983 to 1986. In 1986, she became secretary of the Central Committee of the Communist Party of Kazakhstan. Davletova was a deputy of the 11th convocation of the Supreme Soviet of the Kazakh Soviet Socialist Republic from 1985 to 1990, representing the Satpayev District No. 4.

In July 1989, Davletova was appointed Deputy Chairman of the Gosplan and as Chairman of the State Committee for Light Industry under the Gosplan - Minister of the Soviet Union. She became a member of the Central Committee of the Communist Party of the Soviet Union in July 1990. Between 1991 and 1992, Davletova was chairman of the public organisation "Roslegprom" and was president of the Interstate Union of Light Industry Manufacturers from January 1992 until her retirement in September 1998.

== Recognition ==
She is a recipient of the Order of the Badge of Honour and the Order of the Red Banner of Labour.
