= Vyacheslav Marushko =

Soviet footballer and coach

Personal information
- Full name: Vyacheslav Fyodorovich Marushko
- Date of birth: 2 September 1938
- Place of birth: Moscow, USSR
- Date of death: 7 November 1999 (aged 61)
- Place of death: Moscow, Russia
- Positions: Defender; midfielder

Youth career
- Moscow-Ryazan Railroad Moscow

Senior career*
Years	Team	Apps	(Gls)
1957–1959	Khimik Yaroslavl		
1960–1963	FC Lokomotiv Moscow	99	(5)
1964–1967	FC Torpedo Moscow	86	(7)
1968	FC Dynamo Makhachkala	12	(0)

International career
1965	USSR	1	(0)

Managerial career
- 1971–1976: FC Lokomotiv Moscow (minor leagues teams)
- 1977: Druzhba Yoshkar-Ola
- 1978: FC Energiya Bratsk
- 1980–1981: Lyublino Moscow school (director)
- 1982–1987: Smena Moscow school (director)
- * Club domestic league appearances and goals

Vyacheslav Fyodorovich Marushko (Russian: Вячеслав Фёдорович Марушко) (2 September 1938 - 7 November 1999) was a Soviet football player and coach.

== Honours ==
- Soviet Top League winner: 1965.

== International career ==
Marushko played his only game for USSR on 4 September 1965 in a friendly against Yugoslavia.
