= Oleg Kopayev =

Soviet footballer

Personal information
- Full name: Oleg Pavlovich Kopayev
- Date of birth: 28 November 1937
- Place of birth: Yelets, USSR
- Date of death: 3 April 2010 (aged 72)
- Place of death: Rostov-na-Donu, Russia
- Position: Striker

Senior career*
Years	Team	Apps	(Gls)
1955	Spartak Yelets		
1956	ODO Voronezh		
1957	CSK MO Moscow	2	(0)
1958	SKVO Lviv	22	(6)
1959–1968	FC SKA Rostov-on-Don	257	(119)

International career
1965–1966	USSR	6	(0)

Managerial career
- 1969–1971: FC SKA Rostov-on-Don (assistant)
Medal record
Representing Soviet Union
UEFA European Championship
Runner-up	1964 Spain
- * Club domestic league appearances and goals

Oleg Pavlovich Kopayev (Russian: Олег Павлович Копаев; 28 November 1937 – 3 April 2010) was a Soviet football player.

Most of his career Kopayev was representing the Soviet Armed Forces sports society, particularly in Rostov-na-Donu.

== Honours ==
- Soviet Top League runner-up: 1966.
- Grigory Fedotov club member.
- Soviet Top League top scorer: 1963 (27 goals), 1965 (18 goals).
- Top 33 players year-end list: three times.

== International career ==
Kopayev made his debut for USSR on 21 November 1965 in a friendly against Brazil starring Pelé.
