= Oleh Rodin =

Soviet footballer

Personal information
- Full name: Oleh Dmytrovych Rodin
- Date of birth: 6 April 1956 (age 70)
- Place of birth: Moscow, USSR
- Height: 1.78 m (5 ft 10 in)
- Position: Defender

Youth career
- 1965–1972: Dynamo Moscow

Senior career*
Years	Team	Apps	(Gls)
1972–1973	Dynamo Moscow	0	(0)
1974–1981	Karpaty Lviv	156	(2)
1981–1983	Dynamo Moscow	7	(0)
1983	SKA Karpaty Lviv	3	(0)

International career
1979–1980	USSR	4	(0)

Managerial career
- 198?–1987: Spartak Sambir
- 1987–: LVUFK (assistant)
- * Club domestic league appearances and goals

Oleh Dmytrovych Rodin (Ukrainian: Олег Дмитрович Родін, Russian: Олег Дмитриевич Родин; born 6 April 1956) is a former Soviet football player and Ukrainian youth manager. He was one of the very few players who got called up to the USSR national team from a Soviet First League (second level) club team.

== International career ==
Rodin made his debut for USSR on 21 November 1979 in a friendly against West Germany.
