= Igor Ryomin =

Soviet footballer

Personal information
- Full name: Igor Aleksandrovich Ryomin
- Date of birth: March 20, 1940
- Place of birth: Moscow, USSR
- Date of death: March 27, 1991 (aged 51)
- Place of death: Minsk, USSR
- Height: 1.72 m (5 ft 8 in)
- Position: Defender

Senior career*
Years	Team	Apps	(Gls)
1958–1961	Spartak Moscow	4	(0)
1961–1970	Dinamo Minsk	265	(1)

International career
1964	USSR	1	(0)

Managerial career
- 1990: Viktoryja Marjina Horka
- * Club domestic league appearances and goals

Igor Aleksandrovich Ryomin (Russian: Игорь Александрович Рёмин; born March 20, 1940, in Moscow; died March 27, 1991, in Minsk) was a Soviet football player.

== International career ==
Ryomin played his only game for USSR on November 22, 1964, in a friendly against Yugoslavia.
