= Mikhail Perevalov =

Soviet footballer

Personal information
- Full name: Mikhail Nikolayevich Perevalov
- Date of birth: 1930
- Place of birth: Moscow, USSR
- Date of death: 1995 (aged 64–65)
- Place of death: Moscow, Russia
- Position: Defender

Senior career*
Years	Team	Apps	(Gls)
1953	MVO Moscow		
1953–1954	FC Spartak Moscow		
1955–1960	CSKA Moscow		

International career
1955	USSR	1	(0)
- * Club domestic league appearances and goals

Mikhail Nikolayevich Perevalov (Russian: Михаил Николаевич Перевалов; 1930 in Moscow – 1995 in Moscow) was a Soviet football player.

== Honours ==
- Soviet Cup winner: 1955.

== International career ==
Perevalov played his only game for USSR on September 16, 1955, in a friendly against India.
