= Viktor Getmanov =

Soviet footballer

Personal information
- Full name: Viktor Pavlovich Getmanov
- Date of birth: May 4, 1940
- Place of birth: Leselidze, USSR
- Date of death: April 23, 1995 (aged 54)
- Place of death: Rostov-on-Don, Russia
- Position: Defender

Youth career
- Burevestnik Novocherkassk

Senior career*
Years	Team	Apps	(Gls)
1962–1972	FC SKA Rostov-on-Don	232	(0)

International career
1965–1966	USSR	7	(0)
- * Club domestic league appearances and goals

Viktor Pavlovich Getmanov (Russian: Виктор Павлович Гетманов) (born May 4, 1940, in Leselidze; died April 23, 1995, in Rostov-on-Don) was a Soviet football player.

== International career ==
Getmanov made his debut for USSR on December 1, 1965, in a friendly against Argentina. He played in the 1966 FIFA World Cup.

== Family ==
Viktor Getmanov was the only child of Dmitry and Anna Getmanov (née Popov).
