= Serhiy Rebrov club =

List of football players

Serhiy Rebrov Club (Ukrainian: Клуб Сергія Реброва) is a non-official name of the list of football players who have scored 100 or more goals during their professional career in the Ukrainian Premier League only. This club is named after the first player to score 100 goals in Ukrainian Premier League – Serhiy Rebrov, who reached this milestone during the 1999–2000 season.

Serhiy Rebrov and Maksim Shatskikh share the record for most goals scored, while the most recent player to join the club is Yevhen Seleznyov, who did it on 3 May 2015.

For Ukrainian players who have scored 100 or more goals during their professional career in Ukraine, there is the Timerlan Huseinov club. Aside from that, there is also another club (Oleh Blokhin club) that is designated for all Ukrainian players who have scored 100+ goals during their professional career in and outside Ukraine playing for Ukrainian and/or Soviet clubs and national teams.

== Serhiy Rebrov Club ==
- **Bold** shows players still playing in the Ukrainian Premier League.
- Italics show players still playing professional football in other leagues

As of 23 June 2020

Rank	Player	Goals	Apps	Ratio	Years active (Note: Years active in the Ukrainian Premier League)	Teams scored for
1	(Ukraine) Serhiy Rebrov	**123**	261	0.47	1992–2008	Shakhtar Donetsk (10), Dynamo Kyiv (113)
1	(Uzbekistan) Maksim Shatskikh	**123**	341	0.36	1999–2015	Dynamo Kyiv (96), Arsenal Kyiv (22), Hoverla Uzhhorod (5)
3	(Ukraine) Yevhen Seleznyov	**111**	230	0.48	2007–2016	Shakhtar Donetsk (24), Arsenal Kyiv (19), Dnipro (68)
4	(Ukraine) Andriy Vorobei	**105**	315	0.33	1997–2012	Shakhtar Donetsk (80), Dnipro (12), Arsenal Kyiv (9), Metalist Kharkiv (4)

=== Candidates ===
List includes active players who are 10 goals away (90-99) to join the club. (Note: Ukrainian Premier League top scorers score on average between 13 and 25 goals.)

As of 15 July 2020

Rank	Player	Goals	Apps	Ratio	Years active	Teams scored for
5	(Ukraine) Andriy Yarmolenko	**99**	228	0.43	2007–2017	Dynamo Kyiv (99)
6	(Ukraine) **Júnior Moraes**	**96**	171	0.56	2012–present	Metalurh Donetsk (35), Dynamo Kyiv (22), Shakhtar Donetsk (39)

== See also ==
- Timerlan Huseinov club
