= Oleksandr Tkachenko (footballer, born 1947) =

Soviet footballer and Ukrainian coach

Personal information
- Full name: Oleksandr Mykolayovich Tkachenko
- Date of birth: 24 January 1947 (age 79)
- Place of birth: Kupiansk, Ukrainian SSR
- Position: Goalkeeper

Team information
- Current team: FC Zorya Luhansk (goalkeeping coach)

Youth career
- Lokomotiv Kupiansk

Senior career*
Years	Team	Apps	(Gls)
1966	FC Shakhtar Kadievka		
1967–1978	FC Zorya Luhansk	268 (-265)	
1979–1980	Zenit Leningrad	60 (-74)	
1981–1987	FC Zorya Luhansk	134 (-130)	

International career
1972	USSR	3 (-2)	

Managerial career
- 1981: Zorya Voroshilovgrad (assistant)
- 1991–1993: Vahonobudivnyk Stakhanov
- 2000: FC Rostselmash-2 Rostov-on-Don (assistant)
- 2001: FC Rostselmash Rostov-on-Don (assistant)
- 2003: FC Torpedo-Metallurg Moscow (assistant)
- 2003–2005: FC Zenit-2 St. Petersburg (assistant)
- 2005: FC Moscow (reserves assistant)
- 2006: FC Zorya Luhansk (goalkeeping coach)
- * Club domestic league appearances and goals

Oleksandr Mykolayovich (or Aleksandr Nikolayevich) Tkachenko (Russian: Александр Николаевич Ткаченко; born 24 January 1947 in Kupiansk) is a retired Soviet football player and a current Ukrainian coach.

== Honours ==
- Soviet Top League winner: 1972.

== International career ==
Tkachenko made his debut for USSR on 29 June 1972 in a friendly against Uruguay.
