= Oleh Blokhin club =

The Oleh Blokhin Club (Ukrainian: Клуб Олега Блохіна) is a list of Ukrainian football players that have scored 100 or more goals during their professional careers in top Ukrainian league, cup, European club competitions, national team and foreign leagues. This club is named after first Ukrainian player to score 100 goals, Oleh Blokhin.

== Qualifying goals ==
Traditionally, counted goals scored in the following matches:

1. UL – goals scored in top leagues of Ukrainian football competitions.
2. UC – goals in Ukrainian Cup and Supercup scored in the stages where top league teams participate.
3. EC – goals scored in European Champion Clubs Cup, UEFA Champions League, UEFA Cup, Cup Winners Cup and Intertoto Cup for both home and foreign clubs.
4. NT – goals scored for national and olympic teams of Ukraine, USSR, CIS in the official matches.
5. SL – goals scored in top leagues of Soviet football competitions.
6. SC – goals in Soviet Cup and Supercup scored in the stages where top league teams participate.
7. FL – goals scored in top leagues of foreign football competitions: Argentina, Austria, Belgium, Brazil, Czech Republic, England, France, Germany, Greece, Italy, Mexico, Netherlands, Portugal, Russia, Serbia, Scotland, Sweden, Spain, Switzerland, Turkey, United States
8. FC – goals in foreign Cup and Supercup scored in the stages where top league teams participate: Argentina, Austria, Belgium, Brazil, Czech Republic, England, France, Germany, Greece, Italy, Mexico, Netherlands, Portugal, Russia, Serbia, Scotland, Sweden, Spain, Switzerland, Turkey, United States

== Oleh Blokhin Club ==
As of 3 June 2016

#	**Name**	**Clubs**	Total	**UL**	**UC**	**EC**	**NT**	**SL**	**SC**	**FL**	**FC**
1	Andriy Shevchenko	(Ukraine) Dynamo Kyiv, (Italy) AC Milan, (England) Chelsea F.C.	374	83	21	67	48	0	0	136	19
2	Oleh Blokhin	(Soviet Union) Dynamo Kyiv, (Austria) Vorwärts Steyr, (Cyprus) Aris Limassol	331	0	0	26	44	211	33	14	3
3	Oleh Protasov	(Soviet Union) Dnipro Dnipropetrovsk, (Soviet Union) Dynamo Kyiv, (Greece) Olympiacos, (Japan) ~~Gamba Osaka~~, (Greece) Veria, (Greece) Proodeftiki	275	0	0	6	29	125	14	88	13
4	Serhii Rebrov	(Soviet Union) / (Ukraine) Shakhtar Donetsk, (Ukraine) Dynamo Kyiv, (England) Tottenham Hotspur, (Turkey) Fenerbahçe SK, (England) West Ham United, (Russia) Rubin Kazan	219	123	20	31	15	2	1	19	8
5	Aleksandr Ponomarev	(Soviet Union) Shakhtar Donetsk, (Soviet Union) Traktor Stalingrad, (Soviet Union) Profsoyuzy-1 Moscow, (Soviet Union) Torpedo Moscow, (Soviet Union) Shakhtyor Stalino	184	0	0	0	0	150	34	0	0
6	Maksim Shatskikh	(Ukraine) Dynamo Kyiv, (Ukraine) Arsenal Kyiv, (Ukraine) Chornomorets, (Ukraine) Hoverla	171	124	24	23	0	0	0	0	0
7	Andriy Vorobey	(Ukraine) Shakhtar Donetsk, (Ukraine) Dnipro Dnipropetrovsk, (Ukraine) Arsenal Kyiv, (Ukraine) Metalist Kharkiv	152	105	25	13	9	0	0	0	0
8	Ivan Hetsko	(Soviet Union) ~~Zakarpattia Uzhhorod~~, (Soviet Union) ~~SKA Karpaty Lviv~~, (Soviet Union) / (Ukraine) Chornomorets Odesa, (Israel) ~~Maccabi Haifa~~, (Russia) Lokomotiv Nizhniy Novgorod, (Russia) Alania Vladikavkaz, (Ukraine) Dnipro Dnipropetrovsk, (Ukraine) Karpaty Lviv, (Ukraine) Kryvbas Kryvyi Rih, (Ukraine) Metalist Kharkiv	151	67	7	5	1	14	10	45	2
9	**Yevhen Seleznyov**	(Ukraine) Arsenal Kyiv, (Ukraine) Shakhtar Donetsk, (Ukraine) Dnipro Dnipropetrovsk	149	110	12	13	11	0	0	3	0
10	Ihor Nichenko	(Soviet Union) / (Ukraine) Metalist Kharkiv, (Ukraine) Kryvbas Kryvyi Rih, (Hungary) Stadler Akaszto, (Hungary) Ferencvaros Budapest, (Hungary) Dunaújváros FC, (Hungary) Győri ETO FC, (Ukraine) Zakarpattia Uzhhorod	141	24	3	1	0	0	1	98	14
11	**Andriy Yarmolenko**	(Ukraine) Dynamo Kyiv	139	81	16	17	25	0	0	0	0
12	**Marko Dević**	(Serbia) Zvezdara, (Serbia) Železnik, (Serbia) Radnički Beograd, (Serbia) Voždovac, (Ukraine) Volyn Lutsk, (Ukraine) Shakhtar Donetsk, (Ukraine) Metalist Kharkiv	133	90	4	16	7	0	0	13	3
13	Sergey Andreyev	(Soviet Union) FC Zorya Luhansk, (Soviet Union) FC SKA Rostov-on-Don, (Soviet Union) Rostselmash Rostov-on-Don, (Sweden) Östers IF, (Sweden) Mjällby AIF, (Russia) Rostselmash Rostov-on-Don	130	0	0	2	13	82	13	9	11
14	**Luiz Adriano**	(Ukraine) Shakhtar Donetsk	128	77	19	32	0	0	0	0	0
15	Ihor Petrov	(Soviet Union) Shakhtar Donetsk, (Israel) Beitar Tel Aviv F.C., (Israel) Maccabi Ironi Ashdod F.C., (Ukraine) Shakhtar Donetsk, (Ukraine) FC Metalurh Donetsk	123	18	4	2	0	52	8	28	11
16	Oleg Salenko	(Soviet Union) Zenit Leningrad, (Soviet Union) / (Ukraine) Dynamo Kyiv, (Spain) Logroñés, (Spain) Valencia, (Scotland) Rangers, (Turkey) Istanbulspor	120	7	1	7	0	31	17	48	9
17	Vadym Yevtushenko	(Soviet Union) ~~Zirka Kirovohrad~~, (Soviet Union) Dynamo Kyiv, (Soviet Union) Dnipro Dnipropetrovsk, (Sweden) AIK, (Sweden) IK Sirius	119	0	0	10	1	59	12	30	2
18	Oleksandr Palyanytsya	(Soviet Union) / (Ukraine) Dnipro Dnipropetrovsk, (Ukraine) Kryvbas Kryvyi Rih, (Ukraine) Veres Rivne, (Ukraine) Karpaty Lviv, (Austria) LASK Linz, (Ukraine) Metalist Kharkiv, (Ukraine) ~~Spartak Sumy~~	115	79	22	4	0	0	1	6	3
19	Oleksandr Haydash	(Soviet Union) Shakhtar Donetsk, (Soviet Union) ~~Novator Zhdanov~~, (Soviet Union) ~~Tavriya Simferopol~~, (Turkey) Sarıyer G.K., (Ukraine) Tavriya Simferopol, (Israel) ~~Maccabi Herzliya F.C.~~, (Israel) ~~Maccabi Yavne F.C.~~, (Ukraine) Metalurh Mariupol	114	96	9	0	0	0	4	5	0
20	Hennadiy Lytovchenko	(Soviet Union) Dnipro Dnipropetrovsk, (Soviet Union) Dynamo Kyiv, (Greece) Olympiacos, (Ukraine) ~~Nyva-Borysfen Boryspil~~, (Austria) VfB Admira Wacker Mödling, (Cyprus) ~~AEL Limassol~~, (Ukraine) ~~CSKA-Borysfen Boryspil~~, (Ukraine) Chornomorets Odesa	112	1	0	11	15	56	11	12	6
21	**Oleg Gusev**	(Ukraine) Arsenal Kyiv, (Ukraine) Dynamo Kyiv	111	58	18	22	13	0	0	0	0
22	Vitali Starukhin	(Soviet Union) ~~Sputnik Minsk~~, (Soviet Union) ~~SKA Odesa~~, (Soviet Union) ~~Budivelnyk Poltava~~, (Soviet Union) Shakhtar Donetsk	110	0	0	3	0	84	23	0	0
23	**Oleksandr Gladkiy**	(Ukraine) Metalist Kharkiv, (Ukraine) FC Kharkiv, (Ukraine) Shakhtar Donetsk, (Ukraine) Dnipro Dnipropetrovsk, (Ukraine) Karpaty Lviv	109	84	17	8	1	0	0	0	0
23	Viktor Kolotov	(Soviet Union) ~~Chaika Zelenodolsk~~, (Soviet Union) ~~Trudovye Rezervy Kazan~~, (Soviet Union) ~~Rubin Kazan~~, (Soviet Union) Dynamo Kyiv	109	0	0	8	22	62	14	3	0
25	Viktor Leonenko	(Soviet Union) ~~Geolog Tyumen~~, (Soviet Union) / (Russia) FC Dinamo Moscow, (Ukraine) Shakhtar Donetsk, (Ukraine) CSKA Kyiv, (Ukraine) Zakarpattia Uzhhorod	108	67	12	9	6	9	0	5	0
26	Ruslan Lyubarskyi	(Serbia) Humenné, (Czech Republic) Sparta, (Israel) Maccabi Netanya, (Ukraine) Metalurh Zaporizhzhia	107	4	3	7	0	0	0	79	14
27	Leonid Buryak	(Soviet Union) Chornomorets Odesa, (Soviet Union) Dynamo Kyiv, (Soviet Union) Torpedo Moscow, (Soviet Union) Metalist Kharkiv, (Finland) ~~KPT-85~~, (Finland) ~~Vantaan Pallo-70~~	106	0	0	14	11	63	16	2	0
27	Mykola Kudrytsky	(Ukraine) Dynamo Kyiv, (Ukraine) CSKA Kyiv, (Ukraine) Chornomorets Odesa, (Ukraine) Dnipro Dnipropetrovsk, (Ukraine) Karpaty Lviv, (Ukraine) Kryvbas Kryvyi Rih, (Ukraine) Metalist Kharkiv, (Ukraine) Arsenal Kyiv	106	0	0	2	0	29	12	51	12
27	Serhiy Mizin	(Ukraine) Dynamo Kyiv, (Ukraine) CSKA Kyiv, (Ukraine) Chornomorets Odesa, (Ukraine) Dnipro Dnipropetrovsk, (Ukraine) Karpaty Lviv, (Ukraine) Kryvbas Kryvyi Rih, (Ukraine) Metalist Kharkiv, (Ukraine) Arsenal Kyiv	106	90	14	2	0	0	0	0	0
30	Mykhaylo Sokolovsky	(Soviet Union) FC Dnipro Dnipropetrovsk, (Israel) Bnei Yehuda	105	0	0	5	0	87	13	0	0
30	Viktor Hrachov	(Soviet Union) Shakhtar Donetsk, (Soviet Union) Spartak Moscow, (Hungary) Debreceni VSC, (Hungary) BVSC Budapest	105	0	3	5	1	66	12	20	0
30	Oleksandr Zavarov	(Soviet Union) Zorya Luhansk, (Soviet Union) SKA Rostov, (Soviet Union) Dynamo Kyiv, (Italy) Juventus Turin, (France) AS Nancy-Lorraine, (France) ~~CO Saint-Dizier~~	105	0	0	8	6	56	11	17	8
30	**Artem Milevskyi**	(Ukraine) Dynamo Kyiv, (Turkey) Gaziantepspor, (Croatia) Hajduk Split, (Croatia) RNK Split, (Romania) Concordia Chiajna	105	57	14	16	8	0	0	9	1
34	Timerlan Huseinov	(Soviet Union) ~~Zorya Luhansk~~, (Soviet Union) ~~SKA Kyiv~~, (Soviet Union) PFC CSKA Moscow, (Soviet Union) Metalurh Zaporizhzhia, (Ukraine) Zoria-MALS Luhansk, (Ukraine) Chornomorets Odesa, (Ukraine) ~~Spartak Sumy~~	104	85	8	2	8	1	0	0	0
35	Oleksandr Kosyrin	(Ukraine) FC Torpedo Zaporizhzhia, (Ukraine) FC Dynamo Kyiv, (Israel) Maccabi Tel Aviv, (Ukraine) FC Arsenal Kyiv, (Ukraine) FC Chornomorets Odesa, (Ukraine) FC Metalurh Donetsk	103	84	13	2	0	0	0	4	0
36	Oleg Yashchuk	(Ukraine) Nyva Ternopil, (Belgium) Anderlecht, (Greece) Ergotelis, (Belgium) Cercle, (Belgium) Westerlo, (Ukraine) FC Metalurh Donetsk	102	10	0	4	0	0	0	79	9
37	Serhiy Nazarenko	(Ukraine) Dnipro Dnipropetrovsk, (Ukraine) Tavriya Simferopol, (Ukraine) Chornomorets Odesa, (Ukraine) Metalist Kharkiv	100	73	7	8	12	0	0	0	0

Players still playing are shown in bold.

=== Candidates ===
These players may become members of Oleh Blokhin club soon.

- **Oleksandr Kovpak** - 88 goals
- **Oleksandr Pyschur** - 84 goals
- **Serhiy Kuznetsov** - 77 goals

Active players are shown in bold.

== See also ==
- Serhiy Rebrov club
- Timerlan Huseinov club
