= Timerlan Huseinov club =

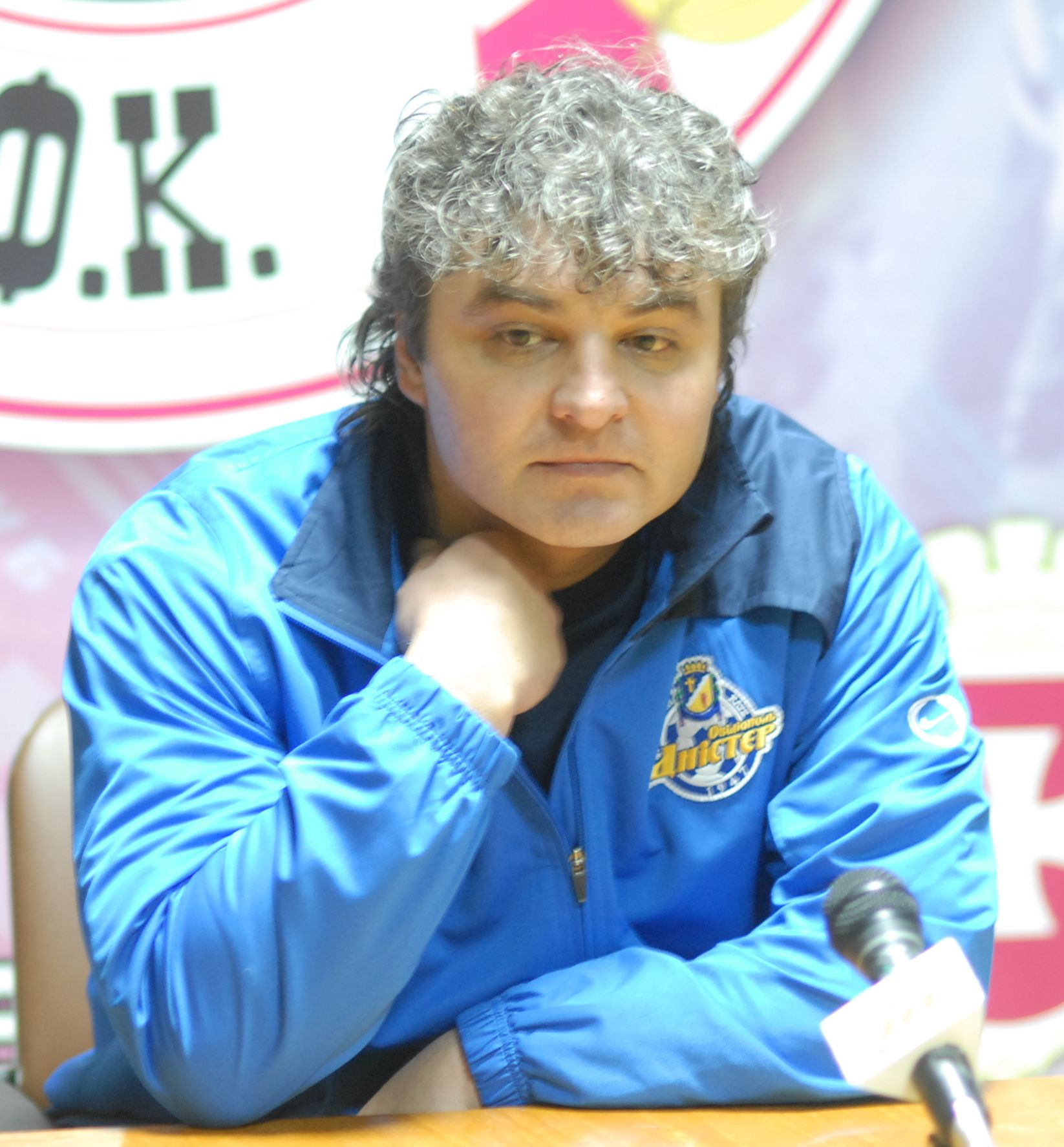
Timerlan Huseinov, c.2008

Timerlan Huseinov Club (Ukrainian: Клуб Тимерлана Гусейнова) is a non-official list of Ukrainian football players that have scored 100 or more goals during their professional career in top Ukrainian league, cup, European cups and national team. This club is named after first Ukrainian player to score 100 goals - Timerlan Huseinov.

== Which goals are counted ==
Traditionally, counted goals scored in the following matches:

1. Championship - goals scored in top leagues of Ukrainian football competitions.
2. Cup - goals in Ukrainian Cup and Supercup scored in the stages where top league teams participate.
3. European cups - goals scored in European Champion Clubs Cup, UEFA Champions League, UEFA Cup, Cup Winners Cup, and Intertoto Cup for both home and foreign clubs.
4. National team - goals scored for national and olympic teams in the official matches.

== Timerlan Huseinov Club ==
As of November 23, 2015:

#	**Name**	Total	**Championship**	**Cup**	**European cups**	**National team**
1	Serhii Rebrov Shakhtar Donetsk, Dynamo Kyiv	189	123	20	31	15
2	Andriy Shevchenko Dynamo Kyiv	177	83	21	25	48
3	Andriy Vorobei Shakhtar Donetsk, Dnipro Dnipropetrovsk, Arsenal Kyiv, Metalist Kharkiv	152	105	25	13	9
4	**Yevhen Seleznyov** Arsenal Kyiv, Shakhtar Donetsk, Dnipro Dnipropetrovsk	146	110	12	13	11
5	**Andriy Yarmolenko** Dynamo Kyiv	128	74	15	17	22
6	**Marko Dević** Volyn Lutsk, Shakhtar Donetsk, Metalist Kharkiv	111	90	4	10	7
7	Serhiy Mizin Dynamo Kyiv, CSKA Kyiv, Chornomorets Odesa, Dnipro Dnipropetrovsk, Karpaty Lviv, Kryvbas Kryvyi Rih, Metalist Kharkiv, Arsenal Kyiv	106	90	14	2	0
8	Oleksandr Palyanytsia Dnipro Dnipropetrovsk, Kryvbas Kryvyi Rih, Veres Rivne, Karpaty Lviv, Metalist Kharkiv	105	79	22	4	0
9	Oleksandr Haidash Tavriya Simferopol, Metalurh Mariupol	104	95	9	0	0
10	Timerlan Huseinov Zorya-MALS Luhansk, Chornomorets Odesa	103	85	8	2	8
11	**Oleg Gusev** Arsenal Kyiv, Dynamo Kyiv	102	52	15	22	13
12	**Serhiy Nazarenko** Dnipro Dnipropetrovsk, Tavriya Simferopol, Chornomorets Odesa, Metalist Kharkiv	100	73	7	8	12
12	**Oleksandr Gladkiy** Metalist Kharkiv, FC Kharkiv, Shakhtar Donetsk, Dnipro Dnipropetrovsk, Karpaty Lviv	100	76	15	8	1

Players still playing are shown in bold.

== See also ==
- Serhiy Rebrov club
