= Golodets =

Golodets (Russian: Голодец) is a gender-neutral Slavic surname. Notable people with the surname include:

- Adamas Golodets (1933–2006), Soviet footballer and manager
- Olga Golodets (born 1962), Russian politician and economist
