= Aleksandr Sidoryuk =

Russian footballer

Personal information
- Date of birth: 22 February 1977 (age 49)
- Place of birth: Tyumen, Russian SFSR
- Height: 1.78 m (5 ft 10 in)
- Position: Midfielder

Youth career
- FC Geolog Tyumen

Senior career*
Years	Team	Apps	(Gls)
1992–1995	FC Dynamo-Gazovik Tyumen	7	(1)
1996	FC Dynamo Moscow	0	(0)
1996	→ FC Dynamo-d Moscow (loan)	6	(0)
- * Club domestic league appearances and goals

Aleksandr Sidoryuk (Russian: Александр Сидорюк; born 22 February 1977 in Tyumen) is a former Russian football player.
