= Tomislav Dujmović =

Croatian footballer

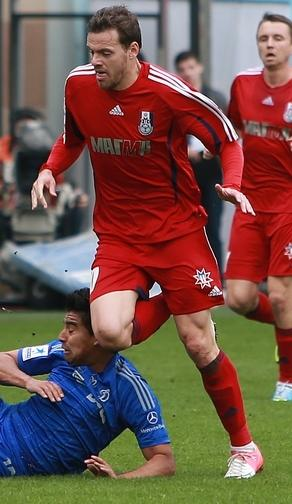
- Dujmović playing for Mordovia in 2013

Personal information
- Date of birth: 26 February 1981 (age 45)
- Place of birth: Zagreb, SR Croatia, Yugoslavia
- Height: 1.88 m (6 ft 2 in)
- Position: Defensive midfielder

Youth career
- NK Sava Zagreb
- Dinamo Zagreb

Senior career*
| Years | Team | Apps | (Gls) |
| 1999–2000 | Dinamo Zagreb | | |
| 2000–2003 | Hrvatski Dragovoljac | 42 | (4) |
| 2003–2005 | Inter Zaprešić | 38 | (1) |
| 2005–2006 | Međimurje | 30 | (3) |
| 2006–2009 | Amkar Perm | 70 | (5) |
| 2009–2010 | Lokomotiv Moscow | 39 | (5) |
| 2010–2013 | Dynamo Moscow | 22 | (1) |
| 2012 | → Zaragoza (loan) | 12 | (1) |
| 2012–2013 | → Mordovia Saransk (loan) | 25 | (0) |
| 2013–2014 | RNK Split | 24 | (1) |

International career
| 2009–2012 | Croatia | 19 | (0) |
- * Club domestic league appearances and goals

Tomislav Dujmović (born 26 February 1981) is a Croatian retired footballer who played as a defensive midfielder.

== Club career ==
=== Croatia ===
Dujmović stated playing football in lower league club NK Sava Zagreb where he was noticed by Croatian giants Dinamo Zagreb. But he never managed to get senior cap for Dinamo so he was forced to leave club in 2000. Next six years he played for Croatian yo-yo clubs Hrvatski Dragovoljac, Inter Zaprešić and Međimurje before leaving for Russia in 2006.

=== Russia ===
Dujmović joined Amkar Perm of Russian Premier League where he soon proved himself as one of the best defensive midfielders in league. After his contract with Amkar expired, Dujmović joined Lokomotiv Moscow where he stayed only for season and half before transferring to Lokomotiv's city rivals Dynamo Moscow for 3 million Euro. Dujmović was a regular first team member in Dynamo, but subsequently lost his place after arrival of new manager Sergei Silkin.

=== Real Zaragoza ===
Struggling Spanish La Liga team Real Zaragoza acquired Dujmović on loan from Dinamo Moscow on 17 January 2012. Dujmović had his debut for Zaragoza on 22 January in a game against UD Levante.

== International career ==
Dujmović was called up by Croatia national team manager Slaven Bilić for a friendly game against Liechtenstein in Vinkovci on 14 November 2009. He made his national team debut in the same match, playing 20 minutes as a second-half substitute. He has earned a total of 19 caps, scoring no goals. His final international was a June 2012 UEFA Euro 2012 match against Ireland.
