= 1979 Soviet Cup =

1979 Cup of USSR in Football
Кубок СССР

Tournament details
- Country: Soviet Union
- Dates: February 28 – August 11
- Teams: 48

Final positions
- Champions: Dinamo Tbilisi
- Runners-up: Dinamo Moscow

The 1979 Soviet Cup was an association football cup competition of the Soviet Union. The winner of the competition, Dinamo Tbilisi qualified for the continental tournament.

== Participating teams ==
Enter in Grouped stage
| 1980 Vysshaya Liga; 18/18 teams | 1980 Pervaya Liga; 24/24 teams | 1980 Vtoraya Liga; 6/154 teams |
| ✓ Spartak Moscow; ✓ Shakhter Donetsk; ✓ Dinamo Kiev; ✓ Dinamo Tbilisi; ✓ Dinamo Moscow; ✓ Dinamo Minsk; ✓ Ararat Erevan; ✓ CSKA Moscow; ✓ Pakhtakor Tashkent; ✓ Zenit Leningrad; ✓ Chernomorets Odessa; ✓ Lokomotiv Moscow; ✓ Kairat Alma-Ata; ✓ Neftchi Baku; ✓ SKA Rostov-na-Donu; ✓ Torpedo Moscow; ✓ Zaria Voroshilovgrad; ✓ Krylia Sovetov Kuibyshev | ✓ Kuban Krasnodar; ✓ Karpaty Lvov; ✓ Pamir Dushambe; ✓ Shinnik Yaroslavl; ✓ Fakel Voronezh; ✓ Zalgiris Vilnius; ✓ Metallist Kharkov; ✓ Nistru Kishenev; ✓ Uralmash Sverdlovsk; ✓ Metallurg Zaporozhye; ✓ FC Torpedo Kutaisi; ✓ Kuzbass Kemerovo; ✓ Spartak Ordzhonikidze; ✓ Prikarpatie Ivano-Frankovsk; ✓ SKA Odessa; ✓ Spartak Nalchik; ✓ Dnepr Dnepropetrovsk; ✓ Tavria Simferopol; ✓ Terek Grozny; ✓ Zvezda Perm; ✓ Traktor Pavlodar; ✓ Dinamo Leningrad; ✓ Kolhozchi Ashkhabad; ✓ Alga Frunze | ✓ Iskra Smolensk; ✓ Kolos Nikopol; ✓ Mashuk Piatigorsk; ✓ Guria Lanchkhuti; ✓ Avtomobilist Termez; ✓ Shakhter Karaganda |

Source: []

== Competition schedule ==
=== Group stage ===
Games took place between February 28 – March 14, 1979.

==== Group 1 ====
[Tbilisi, Rustavi]
1.Dinamo Tbilisi            5   5  0  0  14- 2  10  Qualified 
--------------------------------------------------
2.Torpedo Kutaisi           5   4  0  1   7- 5   8 
3.SKA Rostov-na-Donu        5   3  0  2   9- 8   6 
4.UralMash Sverdlovsk       5   2  0  3   4- 4   4 
5.Dinamo Leningrad          5   0  1  4   2- 6   1 
6.Zarya Voroshilovgrad      5   0  1  4   5-16   1

==== Group 2 ====
[Leselidze, Eshera, Kudepsta]
1.Dinamo Kiev               5   3  2  0   7- 1   8  Qualified 
--------------------------------------------------
2.Iskra Smolensk            5   3  0  2   5- 4   6 
3.Dinamo Minsk              5   2  1  2   6- 3   5 
4.Spartak Orjonikidze       5   2  1  2   4- 3   5 
5.Zenit Leningrad           5   2  1  2   2- 5   5 
6.Nistru Kishinev           5   0  1  4   0- 8   1

==== Group 3 ====
[Dushanbe, Kurgan-Tyube, Nurek]
1.Pamir Dushanbe            5   5  0  0  10- 2  10  Qualified 
--------------------------------------------------
2.Dnepr Dnepropetrovsk      5   3  1  1  10- 4   7 
3.Pahtakor Tashkent         5   2  2  1   4- 2   6 
4.Shakhtyor Donetsk         5   2  1  2   5- 5   5 
5.Alga Frunze               5   0  1  4   0- 7   1 
6.Traktor Pavlodar          5   0  1  4   1-10   1

==== Group 4 ====
[Chimkent]
1.Dinamo Moskva             5   5  0  0  11- 0  10  Qualified 
--------------------------------------------------
2.Kayrat Alma-Ata           5   3  0  2  11- 5   6 
3.Shinnik Yaroslavl         5   3  0  2   8- 7   6 
4.Metallist Kharkov         5   1  1  3   3- 4   3 
5.Avtomobilist Termez       5   1  1  3   3-12   3 
6.Kolhozchi Ashkhabad       5   0  2  3   1- 9   2

==== Group 5 ====
[Sochi, Adler]
1.Spartak Moskva            5   4  1  0   8- 2   9  Qualified 
--------------------------------------------------
2.Neftchi Baku              5   4  0  1   7- 3   8 
3.Zvezda Perm               5   2  0  3   6- 6   4 
4.SKA Odessa                5   2  0  3   3- 5   4 
5.Terek Grozny              5   1  1  3   4- 7   3 
6.Mashuk Pyatigorsk         5   1  0  4   2- 7   2

==== Group 6 ====
[Adler, Hosta]
1.CSKA Moskva               5   4  1  0   9- 0   9  Qualified 
--------------------------------------------------
2.Lokomotiv Moskva          5   3  1  1   7- 1   7 
3.Kuban Krasnodar           5   1  3  1   3- 2   5 
4.Guria Lanchkhuti          5   1  2  2   3- 6   4 
5.Metallurg Zaporozhye      5   1  1  3   2- 6   3 
6.Spartak Nalchik           5   0  2  3   2-11   2

==== Group 7 ====
[Yerevan]
1.Karpaty Lvov              5   4  1  0   8- 3   9  Qualified 
--------------------------------------------------
2.Chernomorets Odessa       5   3  2  0   5- 2   8 
3.Ararat Yerevan            5   3  0  2   6- 2   6 
4.Kolos Nikopol             5   1  1  3   4- 5   3 
5.Spartak Ivano-Frankovsk   5   1  1  3   3- 6   3 
6.Žalgiris Vilnius          5   0  1  4   2-10   1

==== Group 8 ====
[Simferopol, Yevpatoria]
1.Krylya Sovetov Kuibyshev  5   3  1  1   6- 4   7  Qualified 
--------------------------------------------------
2.Tavria Simferopol         5   3  1  1   7- 4   7 
3.Torpedo Moskva            5   2  1  2   4- 3   5 
4.Fakel Voronezh            5   2  0  3   6- 6   4 
5.Shakhtyor Karaganda       5   2  0  3   5- 9   4 
6.Kuzbass Kemerovo          5   1  1  3   3- 5   3

=== Play-off stage ===
==== Quarterfinals ====
[Mar 20] 
Dinamo Kiev             0-1  CSKA Moskva               [in Mukachevo] 
  [Alexandr Kolpovskiy 28. Att: 25,000] 
DINAMO Moskva           3-0  Spartak Moskva            [in Chimkent] 
  [Nikolai Latysh 33, Alexei Petrushin 57, Alexandr Maksimenkov 63. Att: 25,000] 
DINAMO Tbilisi          2-0  Krylya Sovetov Kuibyshev  
  [Vakhtang Koridze 10, Manuchar Machaidze 57. Att: 50,000] 
KARPATY Lvov            3-1  Pamir Dushanbe 
  [Stepan Yurchishin 14, 31, 43 - Viktor Raimjanov 90. Att: 45,000]

==== Semifinals ====
[Jun 9] 
CSKA Moskva             1-2  DINAMO Tbilisi      [aet] 
  [Alexandr Chivadze (D) 23 og – Vitaliy Daraselia 73, David Kipiani 92] 
[Jun 10] 
DINAMO Moskva           2-1  Karpaty Lvov        [aet] 
  [Valeriy Gazzayev 17, Alexandr Minayev 108 – Yuriy Bondarenko 88 pen. Att: 17,000]

==== Final ====
11 August 1979

| Dynamo Moscow | 0 – 0 (a.e.t.) | Dinamo Tbilisi |
|---|---|---|
| | Report |
Penalties
| Makhovikov (penalty missed); Maksimenkov (penalty scored); Petrushin (penalty missed); Pavlenko (penalty scored); Bubnov (penalty scored); Tolstykh (penalty scored); Gazzaev (penalty missed) | 4 – 5 | (penalty missed) Kipiani; (penalty missed) Gutsaev; (penalty scored) Chivadze; (penalty scored) Daraselia; (penalty scored) Shengelia; (penalty scored) Machaidze; (penalty scored) Sulakvelidze |

Lenin's Central Stadium, Moscow
Attendance: 60,000
Referee: Myroslav Stupar (Stanislav)
