= Timofey Marinkin =

Russian footballer (born 2008)

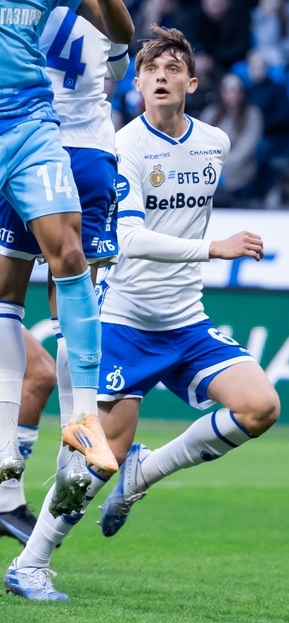
- Marinkin with Dynamo Moscow in 2026

Personal information
- Full name: Timofey Andreyevich Marinkin
- Date of birth: 2 June 2008 (age 18)
- Place of birth: Moscow, Russia
- Height: 1.85 m (6 ft 1 in)
- Position: Central midfielder

Team information
- Current team: Dynamo Moscow/ Dynamo-2 Moscow
- Number: 60

Youth career
- 2013–: Dynamo Moscow

Senior career*
Years	Team	Apps	(Gls)
2025–	Dynamo-2 Moscow	15	(1)
2025–	Dynamo Moscow	17	(1)

International career^{‡}
2023	Russia U15	4	(1)
2023–2024	Russia U16	8	(1)
2025–	Russia U18	4	(0)
- * Club domestic league appearances and goals as of 12 September 2026 ‡ National team caps and goals as of 15 November 2025

Timofey Andreyevich Marinkin (Russian: Тимофей Андреевич Маринкин; born 2 June 2008) is a Russian football player who plays as a central midfielder for Dynamo Moscow and Dynamo-2 Moscow.

== Career ==
Marinkin joined Dynamo Moscow academy at the age of 5. On 2 July 2025, Marinkin extended his contract with Dynamo to June 2027.

Marinkin made his debut for the senior squad of Dynamo Moscow on 5 March 2026 in a Russian Cup game against Spartak Moscow. He made his Russian Premier League debut for Dynamo three days later in a game against CSKA Moscow. On 10 March 2026, Marinkin extended his Dynamo contract until 2029. On 16 October 2026, he extended his contract again, to June 2031.

== Career statistics ==
As of 27 October 2026

Club	Season	League			Cup		Total	
Club	Season	Division	Apps	Goals	Apps	Goals	Apps	Goals
Dynamo-2 Moscow	2024–25	Russian Second League A	2	0	—		2	0
Dynamo-2 Moscow	2025–26	Russian Second League A	13	1	—		13	1
Dynamo-2 Moscow	Total		15	1	0	0	15	1
Dynamo Moscow	2025–26	Russian Premier League	10	0	4	0	14	0
Dynamo Moscow	2026–27	Russian Premier League	7	1	5	0	12	1
Dynamo Moscow	Total		17	1	9	0	26	1
Career total			32	2	9	0	41	2
