= Adamas Golodets =

Soviet footballer

Personal information
- Full name: Adamas Solomonovich Golodets
- Date of birth: 28 March 1933
- Place of birth: Moscow, Soviet Union
- Date of death: 7 April 2006 (aged 73)
- Place of death: Moscow, Russia
- Height: 1.67 m (5 ft 6 in)
- Position: Striker

Senior career*
Years	Team	Apps	(Gls)
1954–1957	FC Dynamo Moscow	9	(2)
1958–1959	FC Dynamo Kyiv	42	(16)
1960–1964	Neftyanik Baku	126	(29)

Managerial career
- 1965: Neftyanik Baku (assistant)
- 1966–1967: FC Lokomotiv Moscow (assistant)
- 1968–1972: FC Dynamo Moscow (assistant)
- 1977–1978: FC Dynamo Moscow (assistant)
- 1980–1984: FC Dynamo Moscow (assistant)
- 1985: FC Dynamo Moscow (assistant)
- 1986–1989: FC Dynamo Moscow (assistant)
- 1989–1991: FC Dynamo-2 Moscow
- 1991–1993: FC Dynamo Moscow (assistant)
- 1992–1994: FC Dynamo Moscow (reserves assistant)
- 1993: FC Dynamo Moscow (caretaker)
- 1994–1995: FC Dynamo Moscow (assistant)
- 1995–1998: FC Dynamo Moscow
- * Club domestic league appearances and goals

Adamas Solomonovich Golodets (Russian: Адамас Соломонович Голодец; 28 March 1933 in Moscow – 7 April 2006 in Moscow) was a Soviet football player and manager of Jewish ethnicity, who played forward for Neftchi Baku PFC, FC Dynamo Moscow, and FC Dynamo Kiev between 1954 and 1964. He later was a manager for Dynamo Moscow as well from 1995 to 1998. He was classified as a Master of Sport of the USSR in 1959.

== Personal life ==
His niece Olga Golodets is an economist who serves as a Deputy Prime Minister of Russia.
