= Kurban Rasulov =

Russian footballer (born 2006)

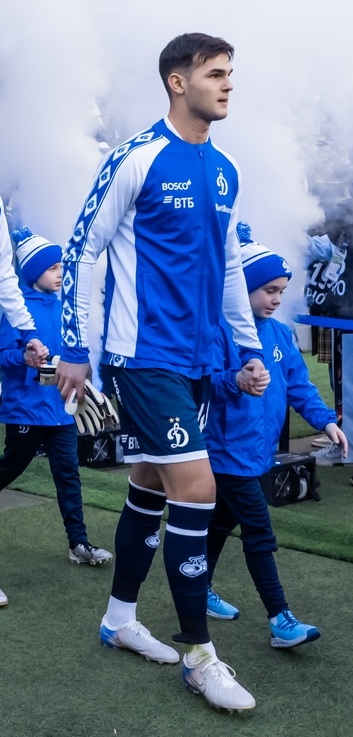
- Rasulov with Dynamo Moscow in 2026

Personal information
- Full name: Kurban Isayevich Rasulov
- Date of birth: 4 January 2006 (age 20)
- Place of birth: Makhachkala, Russia
- Height: 1.93 m (6 ft 4 in)
- Position: Goalkeeper

Team information
- Current team: Dynamo Moscow
- Number: 1

Senior career*
Years	Team	Apps	(Gls)
2022–	Dynamo-2 Moscow	29	(0)
2023–	Dynamo Moscow	17	(0)

International career^{‡}
2021–2022	Russia U16	3	(0)
2022	Russia U17	2	(0)
2023	Russia U18	1	(0)
2025–	Russia U21	1	(0)
- * Club domestic league appearances and goals as of 31 October 2026 ‡ National team caps and goals as of 13 October 2025

Kurban Isayevich Rasulov (Russian: Курбан Исаевич Расулов; born 4 January 2006) is a Russian football player who plays as a goalkeeper for Dynamo Moscow.

== Career ==
Rasulov was raised in the Dynamo Moscow academy and was first included in the senior team's matchday squad as a back-up goalkeeper in August 2023 at the age of 17 after making his first senior appearance in the previous month in a pre-season friendly.

Rasulov made his competitive debut for Dynamo's senior squad on 27 August 2025 in a Russian Cup game against Krylia Sovetov Samara and kept a clean sheet in a 0–0 draw. He followed it up with two more clean sheet Cup appearances before he made his Russian Premier League debut on 19 October 2025 in a game against Akhmat Grozny.

== Career statistics ==
As of 31 October 2026

Club	Season	League			Cup		Total	
Club	Season	Division	Apps	Goals	Apps	Goals	Apps	Goals
Dynamo-2 Moscow	2022–23	Russian Second League	1	0	–		1	0
Dynamo-2 Moscow	2023	Russian Second League B	5	0	–		5	0
Dynamo-2 Moscow	2024	Russian Second League B	12	0	–		12	0
Dynamo-2 Moscow	2024–25	Russian Second League A	7	0	–		7	0
Dynamo-2 Moscow	2025–26	Russian Second League A	4	0	–		4	0
Dynamo-2 Moscow	Total		29	0	0	0	29	0
Dynamo Moscow	2023–24	Russian Premier League	0	0	0	0	0	0
Dynamo Moscow	2024–25	Russian Premier League	0	0	0	0	0	0
Dynamo Moscow	2025–26	Russian Premier League	10	0	4	0	14	0
Dynamo Moscow	2026–27	Russian Premier League	7	0	1	0	8	0
Dynamo Moscow	Total		17	0	5	0	22	0
Career total			46	0	5	0	51	0
