= Leon Zaydenzal =

Russian footballer

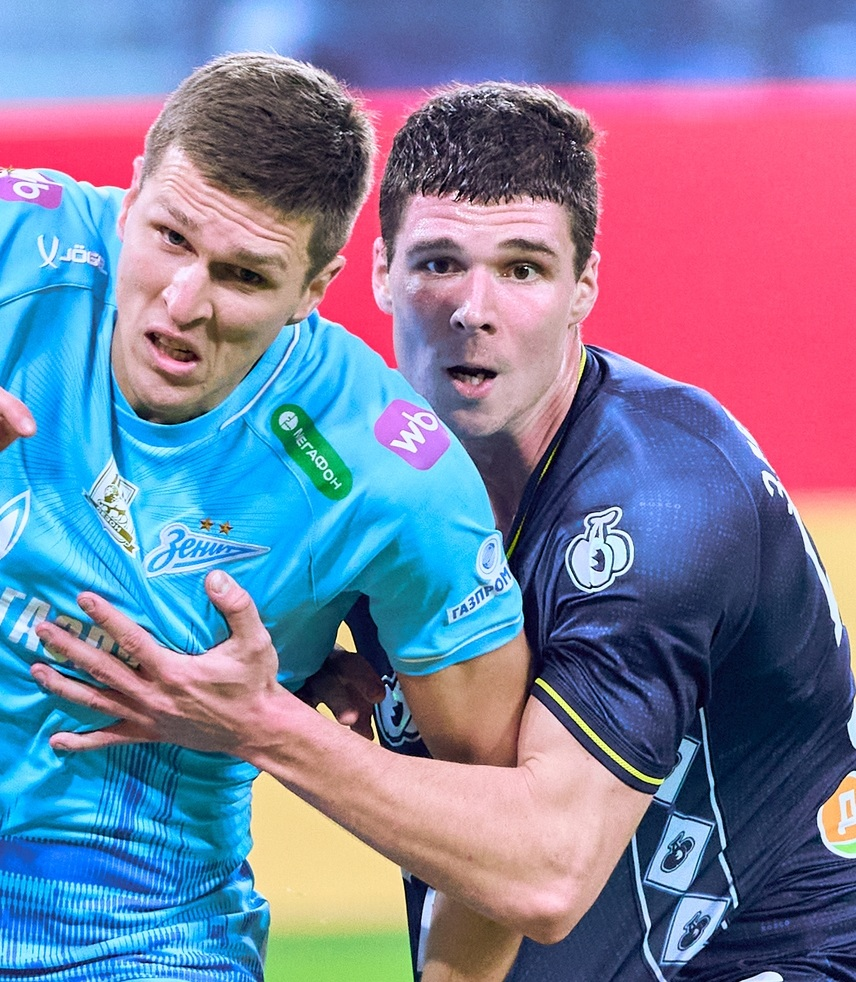
- Zaydenzal (R) with Dynamo Moscow in 2025

Personal information
- Full name: Leon Sergeyevich Zaydenzal
- Date of birth: 8 July 2004 (age 22)
- Place of birth: Krasnodar, Russia
- Height: 1.88 m (6 ft 2 in)
- Position: Right-back

Team information
- Current team: Dynamo Moscow
- Number: 56

Youth career
- 2012–2018: Football academy Krasnodar
- 2019–2022: Dynamo Moscow

Senior career*
Years	Team	Apps	(Gls)
2022–	Dynamo Moscow	14	(0)
2022–	→ Dynamo-2 Moscow	82	(7)

International career^{‡}
2019–2020	Russia U-16	5	(1)
2021	Russia U-17	2	(0)
2021	Russia U-18	1	(0)
- * Club domestic league appearances and goals as of 11 October 2026 ‡ National team caps and goals as of 3 September 2021

Leon Sergeyevich Zaydenzal (Russian: Леон Сергеевич Зайдензаль; born 8 July 2004) is a Russian football player who plays as a right-back for Dynamo Moscow.

== Career ==
Zaydenzal made his debut in the Russian Premier League for Dynamo Moscow on 27 July 2024 in a game against Lokomotiv Moscow.

== Career statistics ==
As of match played 27 October 2026

Appearances and goals by club, season and competition
Club	Season	League			Cup		Total	
Club	Season	Division	Apps	Goals	Apps	Goals	Apps	Goals
Dynamo-2 Moscow	2022–23	Russian Second League	19	1	—		19	1
Dynamo-2 Moscow	2023	Russian Second League B	17	1	—		17	1
Dynamo-2 Moscow	2024	Russian Second League B	26	4	—		26	4
Dynamo-2 Moscow	2024–25	Russian Second League A	15	1	—		15	1
Dynamo-2 Moscow	2025–26	Russian Second League A	5	0	—		5	0
Dynamo-2 Moscow	Total		82	7	—		82	7
Dynamo Moscow	2023–24	Russian Premier League	0	0	0	0	0	0
Dynamo Moscow	2024–25	Russian Premier League	1	0	1	0	2	0
Dynamo Moscow	2025–26	Russian Premier League	9	0	7	0	16	0
Dynamo Moscow	2026–27	Russian Premier League	4	0	4	0	8	0
Dynamo Moscow	Total		14	0	12	0	26	0
Career total			96	7	12	0	108	7

== Personal life ==
Leon was named by his parents after the title character from the 1994 French film.
