= Olga Golodets =

Russian politician and economist (born 1962)

- Ольга Голодец
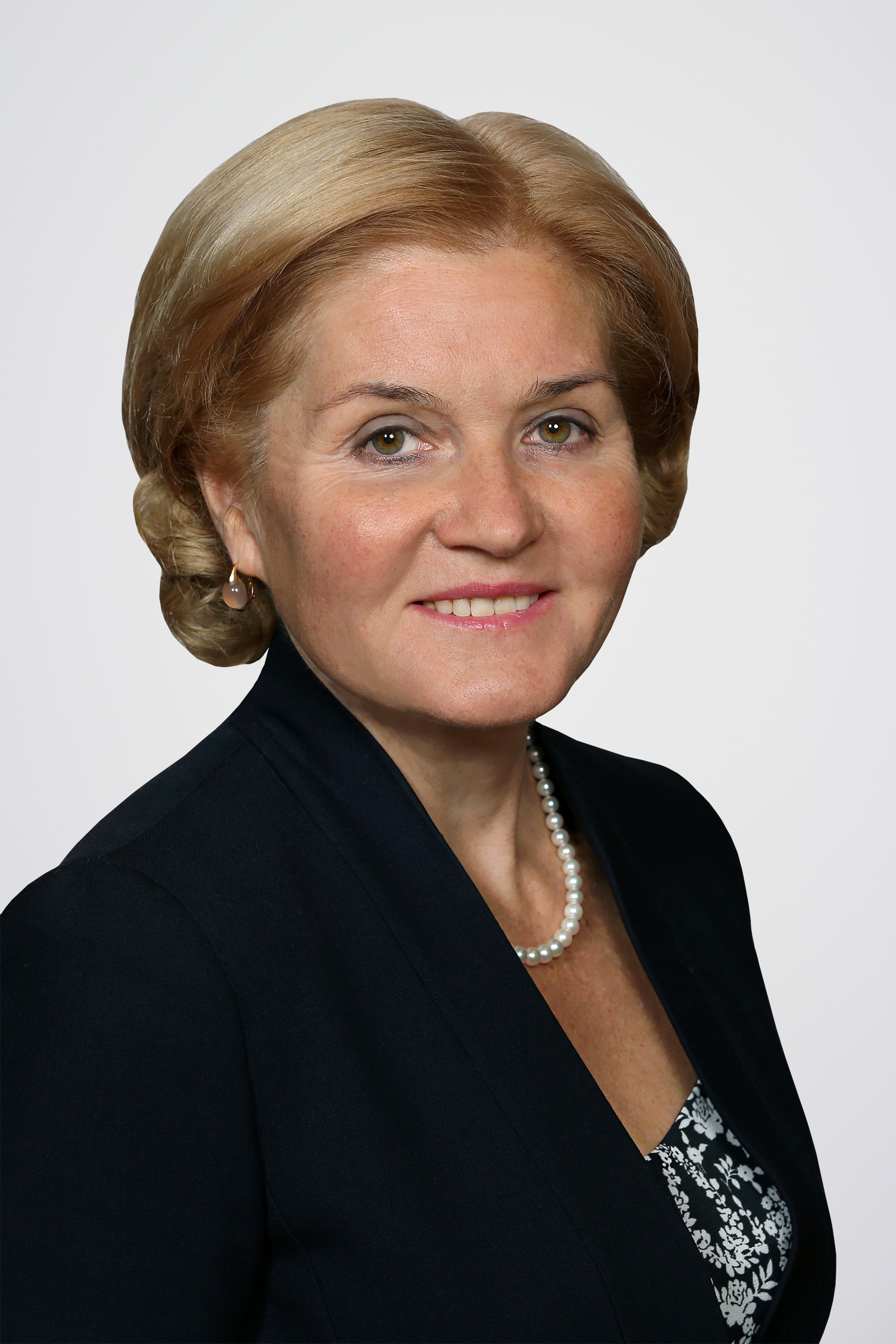

Deputy Prime Minister of Russia
- In office 21 May 2012 – 15 January 2020; Acting: 15 – 21 January 2020
- President: Vladimir Putin
- Prime Minister: Dmitry Medvedev
- Preceded by: Office established
- Succeeded by: Dmitry Chernyshenko

Personal details
- Born: Olga Yurievna Golodets; 1 June 1962 (age 64) Moscow, RSFSR, Soviet Union
- Party: United Russia
- Education: Moscow State University

Olga Golodets (Russian: Ольга Юрьевна Голодец; born 1 June 1962) is a Russian politician and economist who served as a deputy prime minister from 2012 to 2020. She was the most senior woman in the Russian government.

== Early life and education ==
Golodets was born in Moscow on 1 June 1962. She holds a bachelor's degree in economics which she received from Lomonosov Moscow State University in 1984. Her uncle Adamas Golodets was a professional football player and coach with FC Dynamo Moscow.

== Career ==
Golodets began her career as a researcher at the R&D institute of labour and the employment problems institute of the Russian Science Academy. She worked there from 1984 to 1997. Then she became the director at the Reformugol Foundation in 1997 and worked there until 1999. She served as the director at social policy and human resources department and then as the deputy director general for human resources and social policy at Norilsk Nickel company (1999–2001 and 2002–2008). In 2001, she was appointed deputy governor for social issues in Taimyr (Dolgano-Nenets) Autonomous Area. From July 2008 to December 2010 she was the president of the all-Russian inter-industry association of employers and also board chair at the Soglasiye Insurance Company. Then she served as the deputy mayor of Moscow for education and healthcare from 3 December 2010 to 21 May 2012. She was also a member of the Moscow city government during the same period.

She was appointed one of seven deputy ministers to the cabinet led by Prime Minister Dmitry Medvedev on 21 March 2012. She was in charge with social affairs and policies in the cabinet. The deputy premiership for social affairs was firstly established in May 2012. Golodets supported market reform in Russia. Marc Bennetts, writing for the Russian daily Ria Novosti, stated that Golodets was believed to be close to Medvedev and that she had commercial connections with businessman-turned politician Mikhail Prokhorov. In fact, it was Prokhorov, who recommended Golodets for the post of deputy prime minister. Their business ties were resulted from Golodets' tenure at Norilsk Nickel where they worked together. On the other hand, since Golodets lacked prior experience of being a federal bureaucrat she was regarded as one of the "dark horses" in the cabinet.

On 15 January 2020, she resigned from the office after President Vladimir Putin delivered the Presidential Address to the Federal Assembly in which he proposed several amendments to the constitution. On 11 February 2020, she was appointed to the board of Sberbank, as deputy chair under Herman Gref.

=== Sanctions ===
Golodets was sanctioned by the British government in 2022 in relation to the Russo-Ukrainian War.

== Honours ==
- 2015: Commander of the Order of Saint-Charles
