= Sergei Silkin =

Russian footballer

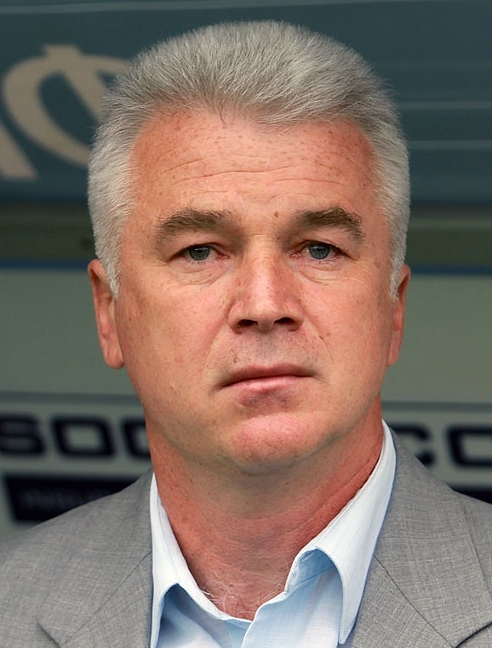

Personal information
- Full name: Sergei Nikolayevich Silkin
- Date of birth: 2 March 1961 (age 65)
- Place of birth: Lyubertsy, Russian SFSR
- Height: 1.80 m (5 ft 11 in)
- Position: Defender

Youth career
- 1980–1982: Dynamo Moscow

Senior career*
Years	Team	Apps	(Gls)
1983–1989	Dynamo Moscow	101	(1)
1990–1991	Dinamo Minsk	18	(0)
1992–1993	R. Jet Wavre	13	(0)
1993–1994	Dynamo-Gazovik Tyumen	16	(0)
1995	Avangard-Kortek Kolomna	21	(0)
1996	Spartak Shchyolkovo	16	(0)
Total		185	(1)

Managerial career
- 1997–2001: Olympic Reserve school Dynamo
- 2002–2007: Dynamo Moscow (youth team)
- 2011–2012: Dynamo Moscow
- 2016: Dynamo Moscow (youth development)
- * Club domestic league appearances and goals

Sergei Nikolayevich Silkin (Russian: Серге́й Николаевич Силкин; born 2 March 1961) is a Russian professional football coach and a former player. He made his professional debut in the Soviet Top League in 1983 for FC Dynamo Moscow.

== Coaching record ==
As of 14 May 2012

Team	From	To	Record				
Team	From	To	G	W	D	L	Win %
Dynamo Moscow II	27 December 2001	31 December 2007					
Dynamo Moscow II	1 January 2011	21 April 2011					
Dynamo Moscow	21 April 2011	Present	49	24	12	13	48.98
Total			49	24	12	13	48.98

== Honours ==
- Soviet Top League runner-up: 1986.

== European club competitions ==
With FC Dynamo Moscow.

- European Cup Winners' Cup 1984–85: 4 games.
- UEFA Cup 1987–88: 4 games.
