= Nikolai Tolstykh =

Russian footballer and administrator

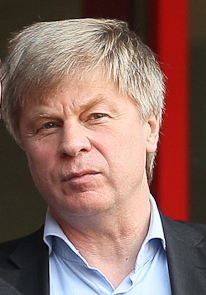
- Tolstykh in 2013

Personal information
- Full name: Nikolai Aleksandrovich Tolstykh
- Date of birth: 30 January 1956 (age 70)
- Place of birth: Moscow, Russian SFSR, Soviet Union
- Height: 1.76 m (5 ft 9 1/2 in)
- Positions: Defender; midfielder

Youth career
- FC Dynamo Moscow

Senior career*
Years	Team	Apps	(Gls)
1974–1983	FC Dynamo Moscow	125	(6)

Managerial career
- 1987–1989: FC Dynamo Moscow (director)
- 1993–1997: FC Dynamo Moscow (president)
- 1998: FC Dynamo Moscow (general director)
- 1999: FC Dynamo Moscow (president)
- 2000–2001: FC Dynamo Moscow (general director)
- * Club domestic league appearances and goals

Nikolai Aleksandrovich Tolstykh (Russian: Николай Александрович Толстых; born 30 January 1956) is a Russian football administrator and a former player.

== Playing career ==
As a player, he made his professional debut in the Soviet Top League in 1977 for FC Dynamo Moscow.

== Later career ==
He has been the president of the Russian Professional Football League since its founding in 1992. Until 2001 that organization conducted the Russian Top Division competition, and since that year it is limited to Russian First Division and Russian Second Division. From 2012 to 2015 he served as the president of Russian Football Union.

== European club competitions ==
With FC Dynamo Moscow.

- European Cup Winners' Cup 1979–80: 1 game.
- UEFA Cup 1980–81: 2 games.
- UEFA Cup 1982–83: 2 games.
