= FC Dynamo Moscow =

Association football club in Russia

Dynamo Moscow
- Full name: Футбольный клуб Динамо Москва (Football Club Dynamo Moscow)
- Nicknames: Belo-golubye (White-blues); Dinamiki; Menty (Cops)
- Founded: 18 April 1923; 103 years ago
- Ground: VTB Arena
- Capacity: 26,319
- Owner: Dynamo sports society
- General Director: Pavel Pivovarov
- Head coach: Sandro Schwarz
- League: Russian Premier League
- 2025–26: Russian Premier League, 7th of 16
- Website: en.fcdm.ru

FC Dynamo Moscow (FC Dynamo Moskva, Russian: Дина́мо Москва́, romanized: Dinamo Moskva, [dʲɪˈnamə mɐˈskva]) is a Russian professional football club based in Moscow. Dynamo returned to the Russian Premier League for the 2017–18 season after one season in the second-tier Russian Football National League.

Dynamo was the only club that had always played in the top tier of Soviet football (along with Dynamo Kyiv) and of Russian football from the end of the Soviet era until they were relegated in 2016. Despite this, they have never won the modern Russian Premier League title and have won Russian Cup only once, in the season of 1994–95.

During the Soviet era, they were affiliated with the MVD (Ministry of Internal Affairs – The Soviet Militia) and with the KGB and was a part of Dynamo sports society. Chief of the Soviet security and secret police apparatus NKVD Lavrentiy Beria was a patron of the club until his downfall. For this reason, the team and fans were nicknamed "the cops" (менты).

From 10 April 2009 the VTB Bank has been the owner of Dynamo after acquiring a 74% share in the club. Boris Rotenberg Sr. was chairman until he resigned on 17 July 2015. On 29 December 2016, Dynamo Sports Society agreed to buy VTB Bank shares back for 1 ruble. On 14 February 2019, Dynamo Sports Society agreed to sell the club back to VTB for 1 ruble. On 24 February 2022, the shares were transferred by VTB back to the Dynamo sports society.

Dynamo's traditional colours are blue and white. Their crest consists of a blue letter "D," written in a traditional cursive style on a white background. The club's motto is "Power in Motion," initially proposed by Maxim Gorky, the famous Russian author, who was once an active member of the Dynamo sports society.

== History ==
=== Foundation and Soviet era ===
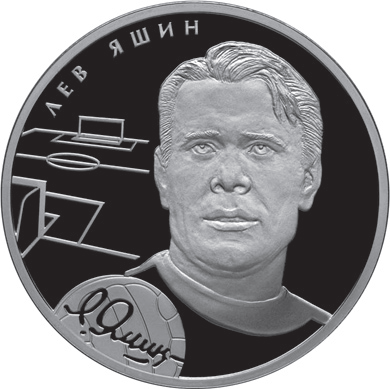
Commemorative coin of Lev Yashin, the legendary goalkeeper of the team.

Dynamo Moscow has its roots in the football Club Sokolniki Moscow.

After the Russian Revolution, the club eventually found itself under the authority of the Interior Ministry and its head Felix Dzerzhinsky, chief of the Cheka, the Soviet Union's secret police. The club was renamed Dynamo Moscow in 1923 but was also referred to disparagingly as "garbage", a Russian criminal slang term for "police", by some of the supporters of other clubs.

Dynamo won the first two Soviet Championships in 1936 and 1937, a Soviet Cup in 1937, and another pair of national titles in 1940 and 1945. They were also the first Soviet club to tour the West when they played a series of friendlies in the United Kingdom in 1945. Complete unknowns to the British, the Soviet players first drew 3–3 against Chelsea and then defeated Cardiff City 10–1. They defeated an Arsenal side reinforced with Stanley Matthews, Stan Mortensen and Joe Bacuzzi by a score of 4–3 in a match played in thick fog at White Hart Lane. They then drew 2–2 against Scottish side Rangers, meaning they completed the tour undefeated.

They continued to be a strong side at home after World War II, and enjoyed their greatest success through the 1950s. Dynamo captured another five championships between 1949 and 1959, as well as their second Soviet Cup in 1953. Honours were harder to come by after that time. The club continued to enjoy some success in the Soviet Cup, but has not won a national championship since 1976. Even so, Dynamo's 11 national titles make them the country's third-most decorated side behind Dynamo Kyiv (13 titles) and Spartak Moscow (12 titles).

In the 1971–72 European Cup Winners' Cup, Dynamo reached the Final at Camp Nou in Barcelona, losing 3–2 to Rangers. This was the first time a Russian side had reached a final in a European competition, a feat not repeated until CSKA Moscow won the UEFA Cup in 2005.

=== VTB Bank era (2009–2016) ===
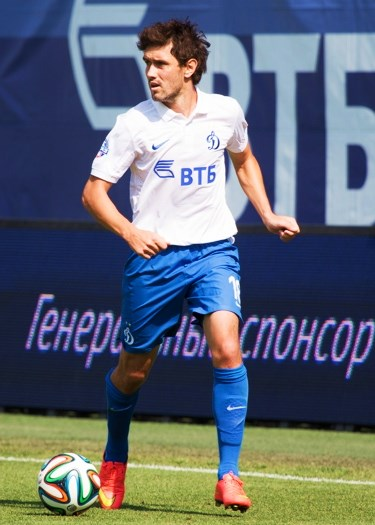
Yuri Zhirkov.

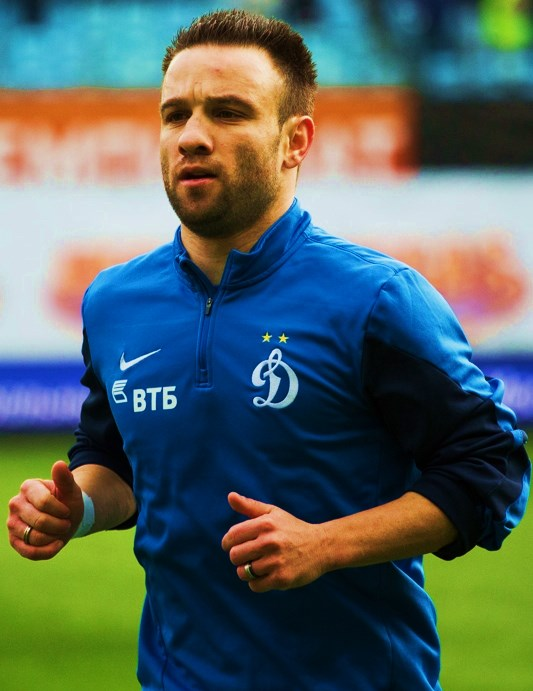
Mathieu Valbuena.

At the end of the 2008 season, Dynamo finished third, qualifying for the 2009–10 Champions League preliminary round. On 29 July 2009, Dynamo recorded a 0–1 away win against Celtic at Celtic Park, which gave them a strong advantage going into the second leg. However, Celtic comfortably defeated Dynamo 0–2 in Moscow to progress, sending Dynamo into the Europa League play-off round where the club was eliminated by Bulgarian side CSKA Sofia after a 0–0 away draw in Sofia and a 1–2 home defeat in Moscow.

In 2012, after a poor start to the season in which they lost their first five league games, Dynamo replaced interim manager Dmitri Khokhlov with the Romanian Dan Petrescu, who managed to pull the club out of the relegation zone into a position in the upper-half of the league table. The team was close to qualifying for a place in European competition, but a failure to win in the last matchday left them in seventh, two points below the last Europa League qualifier position. Despite his efforts, Petrescu's contract was terminated on 8 April 2014 by mutual agreement after a heavy loss to league outsiders Anzhi Makhachkala 0–4. As Dynamo Director of Sports Guram Adzhoyev stated, "Last year Dan drew the team from the complicated situation, lifted it to the certain level, but recently we have seen no progress." Petrescu was replaced by Stanislav Cherchesov as manager. Under his management, Dynamo qualified for the group stage of the 2014–15 UEFA Europa League in which they won every game before falling to Napoli in the Round of 16. Dynamo was only able to finish in fourth place in the 2014–15 season after a string of poor results in the latter stages.

In June 2015, Dynamo was excluded from 2015–16 Europa League competition for violating Financial Fair Play break-even requirements. As a result, VTB Bank proposed to transfer 74 percent of the shares of the club to the Dynamo sports society. Under the proposed plan, the society would own 100 percent of shares of Dynamo as it did in 2009, while the shares of the VTB Arena would still be held by the Bank. The move would allow the club to comply with the requirements of Financial Fair Play, and VTB Bank would continue to provide support to Dynamo to the extent consistent with Financial Fair Play regulations.

Manager Stanislav Cherchesov was replaced by the returning Andrey Kobelev, and many foreign players, such as Mathieu Valbuena, Balázs Dzsudzsák and Kevin Kurányi, subsequently left Dynamo. Several young Dynamo prospects, such as Grigori Morozov, Aleksandr Tashayev and Anatoli Katrich, who won the Under-21 competition in the 2014–15 season, were introduced to the first-team squad.

On 22 December 2015, Chairman of Dynamo's board of directors Vasili Titov announced that the shares had not been transferred to the Dynamo society; that FFP compliance rather than the share transfer was the top priority for the club; and that he expected the club to achieve compliance by April 2016.

After the winter break of the 2015–16 season, Dynamo won only one game out of 12 played in 2016 and Kobelev was fired with 3 games left in the season. On the final day of the season, Dynamo lost 0–3 to FC Zenit Saint Petersburg at home, dropped to 15th place in the table and was relegated from the Premier League.

In October 2016, with Dynamo leading the second-tier Russian Football National League at the time, the newly appointed club president Yevgeni Muravyov claimed that club's debts stand at 13 billion rubles (approximately 188 million euros) and unless a new owner is found shortly or VTB re-commits to covering the club's debts, the club might declare bankruptcy. That would have most likely meant the loss of professional license and relegation to the fourth-level Russian Amateur Football League.

=== Dynamo Society era (2016 to 2019) ===
On 29 December 2016, Dynamo Sports Society agreed to buy VTB Bank shares back for 1 ruble. On 13 January 2017, VTB Bank announced they will sponsor Dynamo Sports Society to the amount of 10.64 billion rubles for the period from 2017 to 2019 (approximately 167 million euros as of that date). HC Dynamo Moscow and other teams of the society were also to be financed under that deal. On 1 February 2017, former club president Boris Rotenberg said that the 75 million euro debt the football club owes to Rotenberg's companies has been restructured and "is not harming anybody". On 12 April 2017, with 7 games left to play in the 2016–17 season, Dynamo secured the return to the top level Russian Premier League for 2017–18. That is the FNL record for the earliest a team secured promotion.

On 14 March 2018, Yevgeni Muravyov was dismissed as the club president due to unauthorized payment made as a "bonus" to a third company during the transfer of Konstantin Rausch from 1. FC Köln.

=== Return to VTB (2019 to 2022) ===
The new stadium for the club, VTB Arena was completed in late 2018. Following that, the stadium majority owner and football club's major sponsor VTB Bank expressed interest in reacquiring the control over the club. On 14 February 2019, Dynamo Sports Society agreed to sell back the club shares to "Dynamo Management Company" (the company that owns the stadium and has VTB bank as the majority owner). The price was the same symbolic 1 ruble. On 26 April 2019, it was reported that the deal is close to be finalized formally, but the price for the stock increased to 10 billion rubles (approximately €138 million). This reported larger number includes accumulated debts and the cost of the club's training centre. (At the beginning of 2021, the club's chairman Yuri Solovyov said in an interview that Dynamo's debts were about 5.4 billion rubles. The then state of the club Soloviev called "shocking".) On 30 April 2019, VTB confirmed that the deal has been closed and formal price is 1 ruble, the debts outstanding from the football club to Dynamo society has been restructured to an 8-year term, and Yuri Belkin was appointed club's general director.

The 2019–20 season, their first back at the home stadium, started poorly and head coach Dmitri Khokhlov resigned after 12 games played with Dynamo in second-to-last position in the table. Under his replacement, Kirill Novikov, results improved and at the end of the season Dynamo finished 6th. That allowed Dynamo to qualify for European competition (UEFA Europa League) for the first time in 6 seasons.

However, at the end of September 2020, Novikov was dismissed after losing to Locomotive Tbilisi (UEFA qualification) and Khimki (RPL). Sandro Schwarz was appointed as the new coach on 14 October.

In the spring of 2021, the sports press started talking about the "revival" of the Moscow Dynamo. Since the appointment of Sandro Schwarz as coach, the team have won seven victories and four defeats in the Russian Premier League matches. The club's sporting director, Željko Buvač, has already described the start of the season as "great." The team finished the season in 7th place.

=== Return to Dynamo Society (from 2022) ===
On 24 February 2022, as a consequence of the 2022 Russian invasion of Ukraine, VTB Bank was sanctioned by the United Kingdom. On the same day, VTB Bank transferred the shares of FC Dynamo back to the Dynamo Sports Society.

After the invasion was launched, former Liverpool F.C. and Ukraine striker Andriy Voronin, who had been the team's assistant coach, left the club, writing that he could not work in a country that was bombing his homeland.

The club remained in second place in the 2021–22 Russian Premier League and at competitive points distance from first-place defending champions FC Zenit Saint Petersburg for most of the season before some late Dynamo losses allowed Zenit to secure the title with three games left to play in the season. The club also qualified for the 2021–22 Russian Cup final, their first Russian Cup final appearance since 2012. On the last matchday of the league season on 21 May 2022, Dynamo lost 1–5 at home to PFC Sochi and dropped to 3rd place, letting Sochi overtake them. Still, that was the first Top-3 finish for Dynamo since 2008. On 29 May 2022, Dynamo lost the Russian Cup final to Spartak 1–2, with Daniil Fomin missing a penalty kick deep in added time. Manager Sandro Schwarz resigned from the club after the Cup final.

Slaviša Jokanović was hired as a new manager on 17 June 2022. Several key starting line-up foreign players from the 2021–22 season left the club on loan or suspended their contracts before the season due to the continuing Russian war in Ukraine, including Sebastian Szymański, Nikola Moro, Fabián Balbuena, Ivan Ordets, and Guillermo Varela. Dynamo took positions in the upper half of the league table, but below the top 3 during the summer/fall part of the 2022–23 season, not going on any long unbeaten or winless streaks. New Cameroonian signing Moumi Ngamaleu was the only Dynamo player selected for the 2022 FIFA World Cup squads (not counting Szymański and Varela who were loaned out before the season). Dynamo went into the winter break of the season in 4th place. The results continued to be inconsistent after the winter break, and Jokanović was dismissed on 14 May 2023 following a 0–3 home loss to FC Akhmat Grozny, with Dynamo in 7th place. Dynamo lost 5 of the last 7 league games and finished in 9th place.

On 22 June 2023, Marcel Lička was appointed new manager. After losing the opening game of the 2023–24 season, Dynamo went into the winter break in 3rd place. After a series of three losses in late March and early April, Dynamo dropped 9 points behind league leaders Zenit and 5 points behind second-placed Krasnodar with 7 games left. However, Dynamo won their next five games, including scoring winning goals late in added time against Sochi and Baltika, as Zenit and Krasnodar both went on winless streaks, and with 2 games left Dynamo took the top spot in the table with a 2 points lead. Dynamo extended the winning streak to 6 in the next game, a win or a draw in the last game of the season on 25 May 2024 away against Krasnodar would have secured the title for Dynamo. Dynamo lost 0–1 to Krasnodar, allowing Krasnodar to overtake them in the standings, as Zenit won their game and claimed their sixth consecutive title, with Dynamo finishing in 3rd place. At the season-end league awards, Konstantin Tyukavin was named player of the season and forward of the season and received the goal of the season award, as Lička was named coach of the season.

Four Dynamo players have been selected for the 2024 Copa América squads (Luis Chávez for Mexico, Nicolás Marichal for Uruguay, Jorge Carrascal for Colombia and Fabián Balbuena for Paraguay).

In the 2024–25 Russian Premier League season, Dynamo gained 30 points after the first half of the games have been played, that was a 5-point improvement on the previous season's record at the same point. Dynamo also never gained more points after 15 games since RPL was created in 1992, and the last time they reached 30 was in 1997. However, they were in 4th place at that point, 7 points behind league-leading Krasnodar. On 2 December 2024, Dynamo goalkeeper Igor Leshchuk scored an added-time equalizer with a header against Akhmat Grozny, becoming the first goalkeeper in the history of the Russian Premier League (and Soviet Top League before it) to score a goal which was not a converted penalty kick. Dynamo went into the season's winter break in 4th place with 35 points, 4 points behind league leaders Krasnodar and Zenit. In the first game after the winter break, Konstantin Tyukavin suffered an ACL tear and was ruled out for the rest of the season. The results remained inconsistent through the spring and, following Dynamo's elimination from the 2024–25 Russian Cup, Marcel Lička left the club on 1 May 2025, with the club in 5th place in the league, 11 points behind Krasnodar with 4 games left to play. Dynamo had 47 points at the time, which matched their total in the previous season at the same time, but several other clubs significantly increased their points total compared to the 2023–24 season. Dynamo finished the season in 5th place.

On 13 June 2025, Valery Karpin was hired as Dynamo manager on a three-year contract. He also remained the manager of the national team as it was only playing friendlies at the time due to the continuing war in Ukraine. The signings of national team players Maksim Osipenko, Ivan Sergeyev and Anton Miranchuk, as well as Kazakhstan international Bakhtiyar Zaynutdinov, who was coached by Karpin before, followed. Dynamo started the 2025–26 league season with 2 wins in their first 8 games, taking 9th place in the standings, 10 points behind the league leaders Krasnodar. They finished the first half of the league season with 17 points, which was the lowest since the 2019–20 season and 13 points below the previous season's record. Karpin resigned from his Dynamo position on 17 November 2025. Dynamo went into the winter break with 21 points in 18 games, in 10th place. On 23 December 2025, Rolan Gusev was confirmed as the manager for the rest of the 2025–26 season after acting as a caretaker after Karpin's resignation. Dynamo remained mid-table in the spring part of the season and was eliminated in the Russian Cup League Path final in a penalty shootout. Dynamo finished the season in 7th place, but contributed to the title race by defeating league-leading Krasnodar in the penultimate league game, allowing Zenit to overtake Krasnodar and eventually claim their 11th title.

On 22 May 2026, Dynamo signed a three-year contract for Sandro Schwarz to return to the club.

Two Dynamo players were selected for the 2026 FIFA World Cup squads (Luis Chávez for Mexico and Juan José Cáceres for Paraguay).

In the 2026–27 Russian Premier League, Dynamo only won once in the first 4 games. After winning their 6 next consecutive games, Dynamo took the top spot in the league on 11 October 2026. On 18 October 2026, Dynamo won their 7th consecutive league game, setting a new club record for the Russian Premier League era (the all-time club record is 17 consecutive games won in the 1945 Soviet Top League season). Dynamo finished the first half of the season on top of the table with 32 points, one point ahead of Zenit and two points ahead of Spartak Moscow.

=== League position ===
Season	Div.	Pos.	Pl.	W	D	L	GS	GA	P	Domestic Cup	Europe		Top scorer	Head coach
1992	1st	3	26	14	6	6	55	29	34		UC	3rd round (Last 16)	(Azerbaijan) Gasimov – 16	(Russia) Gazzaev
1993	1st	3	34	16	10	8	65	38	42	Semi-finals	UC	3rd round (Last 16)	(Russia) Simutenkov – 16	(Russia) Gazzaev (Russia) Golodets
1994	1st	2	30	13	13	4	55	35	39	Semi-finals	UC	1st round	(Russia) Simutenkov – 21	(Russia) Beskov
1995	1st	4	30	16	8	6	45	29	56	Winner	UC	2nd round (Last 32)	(Russia) Terekhin – 11	(Russia) Beskov (Russia) Golodets
1996	1st	4	34	20	7	7	60	35	67	Semi-finals	CWC	Quarter-finals	(Russia) Cheryshev – 17	(Russia) Golodets
1997	1st	3	34	19	11	4	50	20	68	Runner-Up	UC	1st round	(Russia) Terekhin – 17	(Russia) Golodets
1998	1st	9	30	8	15	7	31	30	39	Quarter-finals			(Russia) Terekhin – 12	(Russia) Golodets (Russia) Yartsev
1999	1st	5	30	12	8	10	44	41	44	Runner-Up	UC	2nd round (Last 32)	(Russia) Terekhin – 14	(Russia) Yartsev (Russia) Petrushin
2000	1st	5	30	14	8	8	45	35	50	Quarter-finals			(Russia) Gusev – 12	(Russia) Gazzaev
2001	1st	9	30	10	8	12	43	51	38	Round of 16	UC	1st round	(Russia) Khazov – 10	(Russia) Gazzaev (Russia) A. Novikov
2002	1st	8	30	12	6	12	38	33	42	Quarter-finals	UC	2nd round	(Federal Republic of Yugoslavia) Koroman – 6	(Russia) A. Novikov (Ukraine) Prokopenko
2003	1st	6	30	12	10	8	42	29	46	Round of 32	—		(Russia) Bulykin – 9	(Ukraine) Prokopenko (Czech Republic) Hřebík
2004	1st	13	30	6	11	13	27	38	29	Round of 16	—		(Russia) Korchagin – 4	(Czech Republic) Hřebík (Russia) Bondarenko (Russia) Romantsev
2005	1st	8	30	12	2	16	36	46	38	Round of 16	—		(Brazil) Derlei – 13	(Russia) Romantsev (Brazil) Wortmann (Russia) Kobelev
2006	1st	14	30	8	10	12	31	40	34	Quarter-finals	—		(Brazil) Derlei – 7	(Russia) Semin (Russia) Kobelev
2007	1st	6	30	11	8	11	37	35	41	Quarter-finals	—		(Russia) Kolodin – 9	(Russia) Kobelev
2008	1st	3	30	15	9	6	41	29	54	Round of 16	—		(Russia) Kerzhakov – 7	(Russia) Kobelev
2009	1st	8	30	12	6	12	31	37	42	Semi-finals	CL; EL	3rd qualifying round Play-off round	(Russia) Kerzhakov – 12	(Russia) Kobelev
2010	1st	7	30	9	13	8	39	31	40	Round of 8	—		(Germany) Kurányi – 9	(Russia) Kobelev (Montenegro) Božović
2011–12	1st	4	44	20	12	12	66	50	72	Runner-Up	—		(Germany) Kurányi – 13	(Montenegro) Božović (Russia) Silkin
2012–13	1st	7	30	14	6	10	41	34	48	Quarter-finals	EL	PO	(Germany) Kurányi – 10 (Russia) Kokorin – 10	(Russia) Silkin (Russia) Khokhlov (Romania) Petrescu
2013–14	1st	4	30	15	7	8	54	37	52	Round of 32	—		(Russia) Kokorin – 10	(Romania) Petrescu (Russia) Cherchesov
2014–15	1st	4	30	14	8	8	53	36	50	Round of 16	EL	Round of 16	(Germany) Kurányi – 10	(Russia) Cherchesov
2015–16	1st	15	30	5	10	15	25	47	25	Quarter-finals	EL	Disqualified	(Russia) Kokorin – 4 (Russia) Ionov – 4 (Russia) Kozlov – 4	(Russia) Kobelev
2016–17	2nd	1	38	26	9	3	64	25	87	Round of 16	—		(Russia) Panchenko – 25	(Ukraine) Kalitvintsev
2017–18	1st	8	30	10	10	10	29	30	40	Round of 32	—		(Russia) Tashayev – 7	(Ukraine) Kalitvintsev (Russia) Khokhlov
2018–19	1st	12	30	6	15	9	28	28	33	Round of 16	—		(Russia) Panchenko – 5	(Russia) Khokhlov
2019–20	1st	6	30	11	8	11	27	30	41	Round of 32	—		(Germany) Philipp – 8	(Russia) Khokhlov (Russia) K. Novikov
2020–21	1st	7	30	15	5	10	44	33	50	Quarterfinal	EL	Second Qualifying Round	(Russia) Fomin – 6	(Russia) K. Novikov (Belarus) A.Kulchy (Germany) S.Schwarz
2021–22	1st	3	30	16	5	9	53	41	53	Runner-Up	—		(Russia) Fomin – 10	(Germany) S.Schwarz

=== European campaigns ===
As of match played 20 March 2014

Competition	Pld	W	D	L	GF	GA
UEFA Cup Winners' Cup	35	18	8	9	51	31
UEFA Cup	48	17	11	20	58	74
UEFA Intertoto Cup	6	3	2	1	10	9
UEFA Champions League	2	1	0	1	1	2
UEFA Europa League	21	10	7	4	30	20
Total	112	49	28	35	150	136

Season	Round	Competition	Country	Opposing Team	Score	Venue
1972	RU	Cup Winners' Cup	(Scotland)	Rangers	2–3	Camp Nou, Barcelona
1978	SF	Cup Winners' Cup	(Austria)	Austria Wien	3–3 on aggregate, 4–5(p)	Two-legged
1985	SF	Cup Winners' Cup	(Austria)	Rapid Wien	2–4 on aggregate	Two-legged

=== UEFA ranking ===
As of 9 July 2021

Rank	Country	Team	Points
147	(Netherlands)	Heracles Almelo	7.840
148	(Russia)	Dynamo Moscow	7.676
149	(Russia)	Arsenal Tula	7.676

== FC Dynamo Moscow Women's team ==
In December 2021, according to the strategy of the club, FC Dynamo Football launched Women's team, as well as Women's Youth team and Girl's section in Lev Yashin Academy. Sergey Lavrentiev, graduate of the club UEFA "A" licence holder and former "man at the wheel" of Russian National Women's team, Chertanovo and CSKA Moscow women's teams, was appointed head coach of the new-born first squad. Goalkeepers coach Vitaly Shadrin (alongside same duties at Russian National Women's team) and strength & conditioning coach Yulia Gordeeva have also joined the staff.

== Lev Yashin Academy ==
In 2021 the academy won both winter and summer championships in Moscow youth league, Club's League, being the only club to score more than 200 goals (2,85 per match) and conceding as well the fewest number of 47 goals. Soon after, Alexander Kuznetsov, academy's director since 2013 and since 2006 in the club, has overviewed the evolution of football education in the academy, precising that "we've stopped acquiring "running horses" in favour of footballers – creative, technically skilled and able to make right decisions on the pitch". Mr Kuznetsov has also mentioned the role in modern approach in the Academy of Juan Martinez Garcia, Spanish specialist, who had been working in the club for several years a decade ago. In March 2022, the academy and Higher School of Economics became official partners in education and research.

Franchise

The club has a football Academy named after Lev Yashin (official site), created on the basis of the Dynamo youth team. In recent years, the owners of the club have seriously taken up its development. VTB Group has created an endowment fund with a capital of 5 billion rubles to finance the training of young footballers. The board of trustees of the fund is headed by the former prime minister of Russia, member of the board of directors of Dynamo, Sergei Stepashin. In 2020, 13 graduates of the academy played for the main team of Dynamo.

In 2020, the academy began to develop a network of branches. The first branch was created in Makhachkala (Dagestan) and then in more than 15 Russian cities and towns. In August and September 2021, the latest franchise football schools of the academy were opened in Barnaul, in Belgorod, in Vladivostok, in Voronezh and in stanitsa Novotitarovskaya in Krasnodar Krai. The next branch, based on local "Junior" school of sports, would be coming soon in Nizhnevartovsk.

In August 2021, the club started providing online workshops as a manual to launch Lev Yashin Academy franchises in any Russian city.

Endowment fund

In September 2021, Alexander Ovechkin, worldwide hockey superstar and former HC Dynamo Moscow forward, was named official ambassador for the endowment fund of Lev Yashin Academy. Since September 2021, FC Dynamo Moscow has been launched marketing activities to promote the endowment fund of Lev Yashin Academy. Within the first promo offer, 30% of the cost of official new kit is transferred to support young Dynamo players sustainability, and each kit's buyer could get a number and a name on it for free.

Since September 2021, each purchase in roubles, miles or bonus points by card of VTB Bank could be directly converted into a single donation for the endowment fund of Lev Yashin Academy.

== Ownerships, kit suppliers and shirt sponsors ==
Period	Supplier	Sponsor	Owner
?—1992	Adidas		Dynamo
1992—1997	Umbro	Parmalat (1994—1996)	Dynamo
1997—2001	Adidas	Economy and Life (1998—1999); Fedcom (2000—2001)	Dynamo
2002	Nike		Dynamo
2003—2006	Diadora	YUKOS (2003); Fedcom (2004); Xerox (2005—2007)	Alexey Fedorychev
2006—2011	Umbro	Metalloinvest (2008); VTB (2009—2022); BetBoom (born 2023)	VTB
2011—2014	Adidas	Metalloinvest (2008); VTB (2009—2022); BetBoom (born 2023)	VTB
2014—2019	Nike	Metalloinvest (2008); VTB (2009—2022); BetBoom (born 2023)	VTB
2019—2021	Kelme	Metalloinvest (2008); VTB (2009—2022); BetBoom (born 2023)	VTB
2021—2022	Puma	Metalloinvest (2008); VTB (2009—2022); BetBoom (born 2023)	VTB
2022—	Puma	Metalloinvest (2008); VTB (2009—2022); BetBoom (born 2023)	Dynamo

== B2C Marketing ==
Fashion and Merchandise

In August 2021, FC Dynamo Moscow opened the official fanstore with sports and casualwear at VTB Arena as an integral part of club's renewed brand platform. In December 2021, premiere screening of "Legends of the Future", dedicated to Dynamo's stars Mikhail Yakushin, Konstantin Beskov and Alexei Khomich, was held at club's official fanstore.

The first ever vintage Dynamo's collection was produced in 2008 and then in the late 2010s. A new vintage fashion line was launched in August 2021 featuring heritage brand "Olovo".

In September 2021, iconic British designer Nigel Cabourn started cooperating with the club with a fashion line, which will be his first cooperation with a football club, in a view of FC Dynamo Moscow's centenary in 2022, because vintage has always been a source of inspiration for the designer. In February 2022, Nigel Cabourn presented the whole FC Dynamo Moscow casual range at Pitti Uomo, famous international men's fashion show, at Fortezza da Basso in Florence.

In October 2021, capsule collection, dedicated to Lev Yashin's anniversary, was shown in his favourite cinema, Pioner, in Moscow.

In November 2021, the club organized auction to sell all new collection retro shirts, presented by Dynamo's footballers before the kick-off of the home game with FC Khimki, held on October 22, the day of the anniversary of Lev Yashin, for the benefit of endowment fund of FC Dynamo Moscow.

In December 2021, the club launched its first full-range New Year's collection. In February 2022, in the way to promote the fanstore and the 2nd round of the championship, where FC Dynamo Moscow is running on the Champions League's 2nd place, the club offered a free ticket for each more than 5000 roubles purchase.

"Dynamo Runners" club

In August 2021, "Dynamo Runners" club was launched to promote Dynamo's spirit on a larger scale. Running, fitness and healthy lifehacks in Moscow are scheduled for every new training of the club. Olympic champion Yuri Borzakovskiy has become one of the ambassadors of "Dynamo Runners" club together with top bloggers and other celebrities.

Dynamo & VTB Bank day

In October 2021, Dynamo & VTB Bank day was dedicated to 92nd anniversary of Lev Yashin together with school students, invited to Dynamo's game against FC Khimki, won 4 to 1, and to the official club fanshop at VTB Arena. Communication with school students has been carried on in December 2021 within tours at VTB Arena for school students from Khimki.

Cyber and high-Tech Marketing

The last home matchday vs FC Zenit Saint Petersburg at VTB Arena was powered by the first Augmented reality (AR) show within a football game in Russia.

Dynamo Bookshelf

In February 2022, the club presented two books about Gavriil Kachalin and Igor Chislenko as a part of "Legends and Lives" serie. One year before, the club also published the book about Mikhail Yakushin.

Social Media

In January 2022, according to Deportes y Finanzas, the club became the most popular Russian football team on YouTube in the year 2021.

Charity

During the season 2021–22, the club upscaled its charity matchday activities with 100 roubles from each ticket and 20% of merchandise sales provided to numerous charity funds.

== Rivalries ==
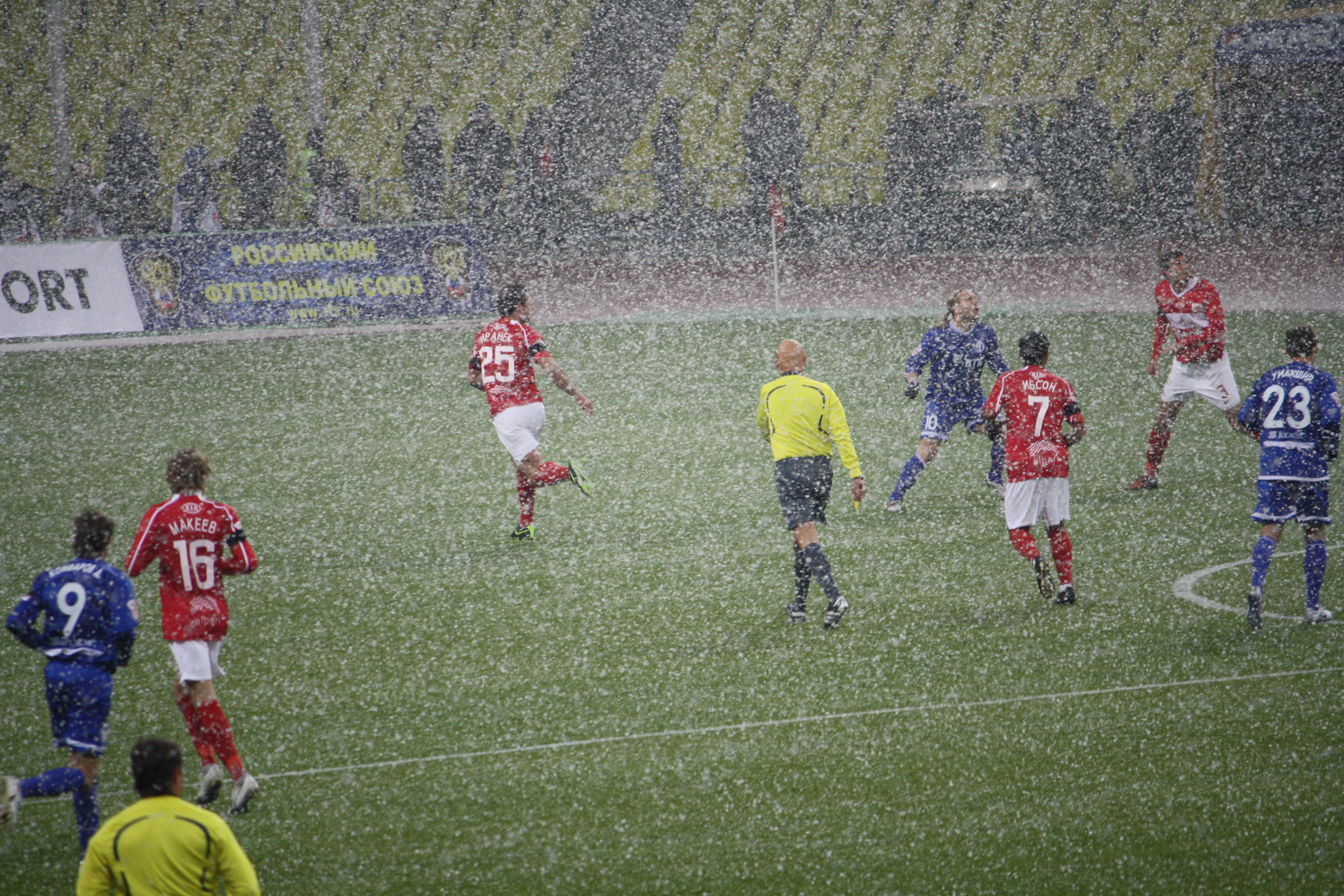
Spartak vs Dinamo in Luzhnikí on 14 March 2010.

Since its establishment in 1923, Dynamo's historical rival has been Spartak Moscow. Clashes between the clubs were seen by their fans and more generally as the most important games in the Soviet Union for more than three decades, attracting thousands of spectators. (Ironically, however, on New Year's Day in 1936, it was a combined Dynamo-Spartak team that traveled to Paris to face Racing Club de France, then one of Europe's top teams.) Dynamo clinched the first-ever Soviet League by beating Spartak 1–0 at Dynamo Stadium. Spartak responded by winning the championship the following year.

== Stadium ==
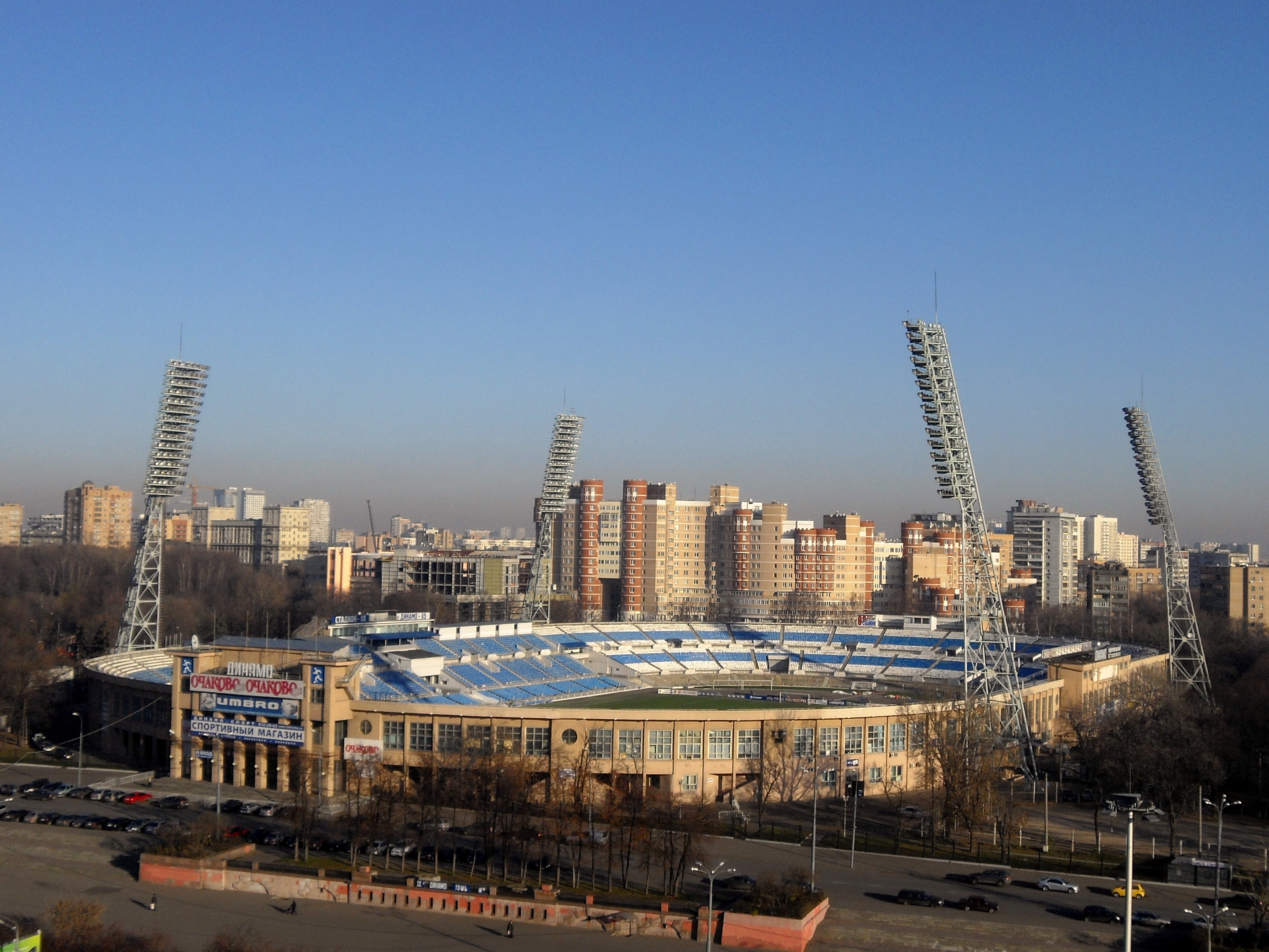
View of the historical Dynamo Stadium, home of Dynamo from 1928 to 2008. In 2011, it was demolished in preparation for a new stadium, which has now been built, and is now known as the VTB Arena.

Dynamo's ground used to be the historic Dynamo Stadium in Petrovsky Park, which seated 36,540. In 2008, it was closed for demolition. From 2010 to 2016, Dynamo Moscow played their matches at the Arena Khimki, which they shared with their Moscow rivals, CSKA Moscow. They continued to play at Arena Khimki until 26 May 2019, when FC Dynamo Moscow officially "returned home," as they played their first match at the newly opened VTB Arena.

=== Average attendance ===
Year	Average
1970	30,331
1971	28,833
1972	21,787
1973	19,967
1974	24,333
1975	23,327
1976	15,529
1977	17,667
1978	8,987
1979	10,147
1980	10,088
1981	10,804
1982	8,853
1983	8,576
1984	9,359
1985	9,129
1986	13,527

Year	Average
1987	16,507
1988	11,600
1989	13,813
1990	9,233
1991	7,627
1992	4,323
1993	4,465
1994	2,882
1995	3,713
1996	3,476
1997	6,000
1998	5,127
1999	8,367
2000	8,867
2001	6,933
2002	6,800

Year	Average
2003	6,600
2004	5,300
2005	8,500
2006	8,067
2007	9,733
2008	13,067
2009	7,752
2010	7,116
2011–12	10,193
2012–13	7,516
2013–14	7,860
2014–15	8,176
2015–16	5,956
2016–17	4,089
2017–18	6,795
2018–19	8,446
2019–20	11,191
2020–21	7,562
2021–22	10,774
2022–23	13,774

In the 1st half of the 2021–22 season Dynamo recorded the best attendance at home among Moscow football clubs, according to official stats provided by Russian Premier League.

== Honours ==
=== Domestic ===
- Soviet Top League/Russian Premier League
  - Champions (11): 1936 (spring), 1937, 1940, 1945, 1949, 1954, 1955, 1957, 1959, 1963, 1976
  - Runners-up (12): 1936 (autumn), 1946, 1947, 1948, 1950, 1956, 1958, 1962, 1967, 1970, 1986, 1994
  - Third Place (11): 1952, 1960, 1973, 1975, 1990, 1992, 1993, 1997, 2008, 2021–22, 2023–24
- Soviet Cup/Russian Cup
  - Winners (7): 1937, 1953, 1966–67, 1970, 1977, 1984, 1994–95
  - Runners-up (9): 1945, 1949, 1950, 1955, 1979, 1996–97, 1998–99, 2011–12, 2021–22
- Soviet Super Cup/Russian Super Cup
  - Winners: 1977
  - Runners-up: 1984
- Russian Football National League
  - Winners: 2016–17

=== European ===
- UEFA Cup Winners' Cup
  - Runners-up: 1971–72

=== Non-official ===
- Ciutat de Barcelona Trophy
  - Winners: 1976
- Atlantic Cup
  - Winners: 2015
- Lev Yashin Cup
  - Winners: 2010

== Players ==
=== Current squad ===
As of 8 October 2026, according to the RPL official website

Note: Flags indicate national team as defined under FIFA eligibility rules; some limited exceptions apply. Players may hold more than one non-FIFA nationality.

No.	Pos.	Nation	Player
1	GK	RUS	Kurban Rasulov
2	DF	URU	Nicolás Marichal
4	DF	PAR	Juan José Cáceres
5	DF	SRB	Milan Majstorović
6	DF	PAR	Roberto Fernández
7	DF	RUS	Dmitri Skopintsev
8	MF	BRA	Rubens
10	MF	BRA	Bitello
11	FW	BRA	Arthur Gomes
15	MF	RUS	Danil Glebov
19	MF	KAZ	Bakhtiyar Zaynutdinov
21	MF	RUS	Anton Miranchuk
24	MF	MEX	Luis Chávez
28	MF	CHI	Maximiliano Gutiérrez

No.	Pos.	Nation	Player
31	GK	RUS	Igor Leshchuk
33	FW	RUS	Ivan Sergeyev
50	MF	RUS	Aleksandr Kutitsky
55	DF	RUS	Maksim Osipenko
56	DF	RUS	Leon Zaydenzal
57	DF	BRA	David Ricardo
60	MF	RUS	Timofey Marinkin
70	FW	RUS	Konstantin Tyukavin
74	MF	RUS	Daniil Fomin
77	FW	HAI	Josué Casimir (on loan from Auxerre)
88	MF	RUS	Viktor Okishor
91	FW	RUS	Yaroslav Gladyshev
99	GK	RUS	Andrey Lunyov

==== Out on loan ====
Note: Flags indicate national team as defined under FIFA eligibility rules; some limited exceptions apply. Players may hold more than one non-FIFA nationality.

No.	Pos.	Nation	Player
—	GK	BLR	Andrey Kudravets (at Dinamo Minsk until 30 June 2027)
—	DF	RUS	Stanislav Bessmertny (at Rodina Moscow until 30 June 2027)
—	MF	RUS	Dmitri Aleksandrov (at Dynamo Makhachkala until 30 June 2027)
—	MF	RUS	Yegor Nazarenko (at Orenburg until 30 June 2027)

No.	Pos.	Nation	Player
—	FW	RUS	Ulvi Babayev (at Rubin Kazan until 30 June 2027)
—	FW	RUS	Denis Bokov (at Ural Yekaterinburg until 30 June 2027)
—	FW	MAR	El Mehdi Maouhoub (at Dubai United until 30 June 2027)

==== FC Dynamo-2 Moscow ====
Following Dynamo's relegation from the Russian Premier League (which holds its own competition for the Under-19 teams of the Premier League clubs) at the end of the 2015–16 season, the reserve squad FC Dynamo-2 Moscow received professional license and was registered to play in the third-tier Russian Professional Football League, beginning with the 2016–17 season. Following the main squad's promotion back to the RPL, they stopped playing professionally in the 2017–18 season, with players returning to the RPL U19 tournament. Dynamo-2 returned to PFL for the 2020–21 season.

== Notable players ==
USSR/Russia

- (Soviet Union) Viktor Anichkin
- (Soviet Union) Anatoly Baidachny
- (Soviet Union) Vladimir Belyayev
- (Soviet Union) Konstantin Beskov
- (Soviet Union) Aleksandr Bubnov
- (Soviet Union) Igor Chislenko
- (Soviet Union) Yevgeni Dolgov
- (Soviet Union) Oleg Dolmatov
- (Soviet Union) Valery Gazzaev
- (Soviet Union) Gennadi Gusarov
- (Soviet Union) Vladimir Kesarev
- (Soviet Union) Valeri Kleimyonov
- (Soviet Union) Valery Korolenkov
- (Soviet Union) Alexei Khomich
- (Soviet Union) Viktor Losev
- (Soviet Union) Evgeny Lovchev
- (Soviet Union) Alakbar Mammadov
- (Soviet Union) Eduard Mudrik
- (Soviet Union) Aleksandr Novikov
- (Soviet Union) Vladimir Pilguy
- (Soviet Union) Viktor Tsarev
- (Soviet Union) Aleksandr Uvarov
- (Soviet Union) Andrei Yakubik
- (Soviet Union) Mikhail Yakushin
- (Soviet Union) Lev Yashin
- (Soviet Union) Gennady Yevriuzhikin
- (Commonwealth of Independent States) Valeri Kleimyonov
- (Russia) Vladimir Beschastnykh
- (Russia) (Soviet Union) Aleksandr Borodyuk
- (Russia) Dmitri Bulykin
- (Russia) Pyotr Bystrov
- (Russia) (Commonwealth of Independent States) Dmitri Cheryshev
- (Russia) Igor Denisov
- (Russia) (Commonwealth of Independent States) (Soviet Union) Igor Dobrovolsky
- (Russia) Yuri Drozdov
- (Russia) Daniil Fomin
- (Russia) Vladimir Gabulov
- (Russia) Yaroslav Gladyshev
- (Russia) Danil Glebov
- (Russia) Vladimir Granat
- (Russia) Sergey Grishin
- (Russia) Rolan Gusev
- (Russia) Aleksei Ionov
- (Russia) (Commonwealth of Independent States) (Soviet Union) Andrei Ivanov
- (Russia) Andrei Karyaka
- (Russia) Aleksandr Kerzhakov
- (Russia) (Commonwealth of Independent States) (Soviet Union) Dmitri Kharine
- (Russia) Yevgeni Kharlachyov
- (Russia) Dmitri Khokhlov
- (Russia) (Commonwealth of Independent States) (Soviet Union) Sergei Kiriakov
- (Russia) Andrey Kobelev
- (Russia) Aleksandr Kokorin
- (Russia) Denis Kolodin
- (Russia) Sergei Kolotovkin
- (Russia) (Soviet Union) Igor Kolyvanov
- (Russia) Dmitri Kombarov
- (Russia) Nikolay Komlichenko
- (Russia) Yuri Kovtun
- (Russia) Aleksei Kozlov
- (Russia) Andrey Lunyov
- (Russia) Anton Miranchuk
- (Russia) (Soviet Union) Andrei Mokh
- (Russia) (Germany) Roman Neustädter
- (Russia) Sergei Ovchinnikov
- (Russia) Maksim Osipenko
- (Russia) Kirill Panchenko
- (Russia) Aleksandr Panov
- (Russia) Sergei Parshivlyuk
- (Russia) Ruslan Pimenov
- (Russia) Nikolai Pisarev
- (Russia) Pavel Pogrebnyak
- (Russia) Vladislav Radimov
- (Russia) Konstantin Rausch
- (Russia) Aleksei Rebko
- (Russia) Aleksandr Samedov
- (Russia) Igor Semshov
- (Russia) Ivan Sergeyev
- (Russia) Anton Shunin
- (Russia) Igor Simutenkov
- (Russia) Igor Sklyarov
- (Russia) Alexey Smertin
- (Russia) Fyodor Smolov
- (Russia) Sergei Terekhov
- (Russia) Oleg Teryokhin
- (Russia) Omari Tetradze
- (Russia) Aleksandr Tochilin
- (Russia) (Ukraine) (Commonwealth of Independent States) (Soviet Union) Akhrik Tsveiba
- (Russia) Konstantin Tyukavin
- (Russia) Andrey Yeshchenko
- (Russia) Roman Yevgenyev
- (Russia) Artur Yusupov
- (Russia) Arsen Zakharyan
- (Russia) Yuriy Zhirkov
- (Russia) Roman Zobnin

Europe

- (Armenia) Roman Berezovsky
- (Austria) Jakob Jantscher
- (Azerbaijan) Vali Gasimov
- (Azerbaijan) Dmitriy Kramarenko
- (Azerbaijan) Ramil Sheydayev
- (Belarus) Stanislaw Drahun
- (Belarus) Vasily Khomutovsky
- (Belarus) Andrey Kudravets
- (Belarus) Aliaksandr Kulchiy
- (Belarus) Pavel Nyakhaychyk
- (Belarus) Maksim Romaschenko
- (Belarus) Igor Shitov
- (Belarus) Aleh Shkabara
- (Belarus) Sergei Shtanyuk
- (Belarus) Gennady Tumilovich
- (Bosnia and Herzegovina) Zvjezdan Misimović
- (Bosnia and Herzegovina) Toni Šunjić
- (Bulgaria) Tsvetan Genkov
- (Croatia) Tomislav Dujmović
- (Croatia) Nikola Moro
- (Croatia) Gordon Schildenfeld
- (Czech Republic) Erich Brabec
- (Czech Republic) Martin Hašek
- (Czech Republic) Stanislav Vlček
- (Finland) Boris Rotenberg
- (Finland) Moshtagh Yaghoubi
- (France) Mathieu Valbuena
- (Georgia (country)) Luka Gagnidze
- (Georgia (country)) Otar Khizaneishvili
- (Georgia (country)) Saba Sazonov
- (Georgia (country)) Kakhaber Tskhadadze
- (Germany) Kevin Kurányi
- (Greece) Giourkas Seitaridis
- (Hungary) Balázs Dzsudzsák
- (Israel) Eli Dasa
- (Kazakhstan) Ruslan Baltiev
- (Kazakhstan) Andrei Karpovich
- (Kazakhstan) Bakhtiyar Zaynutdinov
- (Latvia) Andrejs Prohorenkovs
- (Lithuania) Fedor Černych
- (Lithuania) Deividas Česnauskis
- (Lithuania) Edgaras Česnauskis
- (Lithuania) Mindaugas Kalonas
- (Lithuania) Žydrūnas Karčemarskas
- (Lithuania) Arūnas Klimavičius
- (Lithuania) Robertas Poškus
- (Lithuania) Deividas Šemberas
- (Lithuania) Tomas Tamošauskas
- (Lithuania) Darius Žutautas
- (Moldova) Valeriu Andronic
- (Moldova) Alexandru Epureanu
- (Montenegro) Radoslav Batak
- (Montenegro) Fatos Bećiraj
- (Montenegro) Jovan Tanasijević
- (Netherlands) Otman Bakkal
- (Norway) Mathias Normann
- (Poland) Marcin Kowalczyk
- (Poland) Sebastian Szymański
- (Portugal) Costinha
- (Portugal) Custódio Castro
- (Portugal) Danny
- (Portugal) Jorge Ribeiro
- (Portugal) Maniche
- (Portugal) Nuno Frechaut
- (Romania) George Florescu
- (Romania) Adrian Ropotan
- (Serbia) (Serbia and Montenegro) Ognjen Koroman
- (Serbia) Marko Lomić
- (Slovakia) Michal Hanek
- (Slovakia) Zsolt Hornyák
- (Slovakia) Tomáš Hubočan
- (Slovakia) Martin Jakubko
- (Sweden) Oscar Hiljemark
- (Sweden) Sebastian Holmén
- (Ukraine) Yuri Kalitvintsev
- (Ukraine) Maxym Levitsky
- (Ukraine) Ivan Ordets
- (Ukraine) Vyacheslav Sviderskyi
- (Ukraine) Andriy Voronin

South and Central America

- (Argentina) Leandro Fernández
- (Brazil) Thiago Silva
- (Chile) Maximiliano Gutiérrez
- (Colombia) Jorge Carrascal
- (Ecuador) Christian Noboa
- (Haiti) Josué Casimir
- (Mexico) Luis Chávez
- (Paraguay) Fabián Balbuena
- (Paraguay) Juan José Cáceres
- (Peru) Andrés Mendoza
- (Uruguay) Diego Laxalt
- (Uruguay) Nicolás Marichal
- (Uruguay) Guillermo Varela

Africa

- (Burkina Faso) Charles Kaboré
- (Cameroon) Clinton N'Jie
- (Cameroon) Moumi Ngamaleu
- (Republic of the Congo) Christopher Samba
- (Ghana) Baffour Gyan
- (Guinea-Bissau) Cícero
- (Mali) Samba Sow
- (Nigeria) Joseph Enakarhire
- (Nigeria) Sylvester Igboun
- (Nigeria) Patrick Ovie
- (Senegal) Pascal Mendy
- (Senegal) Pape Thiaw

Asia and Oceania

- (Australia) Luke Wilkshire

=== Most appearances ===
R	Player	Nat.	App.
1	Aleksandr Novikov	(Soviet Union) (Russia)	395
2	Aleksandr Makhovikov	(Soviet Union) (Russia)	363
3	Anton Shunin	(Russia)	359
4	Lev Yashin	(Soviet Union)	358
5	Valery Maslov	(Soviet Union) (Russia)	351
6	Sergei Nikulin	(Soviet Union) (Russia)	336
7	Gennady Yevryuzhikhin	(Soviet Union) (Russia)	334
8	Viktor Anichkin	(Soviet Union)	322
9	Andrei Kobelev	(Soviet Union) (Russia)	311
10	Aleksei Petrushin	(Soviet Union)	305

=== Most goals ===
R	Player	Nat.	Goals
1	Sergei Solovyov	(Soviet Union)	127
2	Konstantin Beskov	(Soviet Union) (Russia)	91
3	Vasili Kartsev	(Soviet Union)	72
4	Valery Gazzaev	(Soviet Union) (Russia)	70
5	Igor Chislenko	(Soviet Union) (Russia)	68
6	Oleg Teryokhin	(Soviet Union) (Russia)	67
7	Vasili Trofimov	(Soviet Union) (Russia)	67
8	Vladimir Ilyin	(Soviet Union) (Russia)	63
9	Vladimir Savdunin	(Soviet Union) (Russia)	62
10	Kevin Kurányi	(Germany)	56

=== One-club men ===
Player	Nationality	Position	Debut	Last Match
Vasili Trofimov	(Soviet Union)	FW	1931	1949
Lev Yashin	(Soviet Union)	GK	1949	1971
Viktor Tsaryov	(Soviet Union) (Russia)	MF	1955	1966
Eduard Mudrik	(Soviet Union) (Russia)	DF	1957	1968
Vladimir Kesarev	(Soviet Union) (Russia)	DF	1956	1965
Nikolai Tolstykh	(Soviet Union) (Russia)	DF	1977	1983
Anton Shunin	(Russia)	GK	2004	-

== Coaching and medical staff ==
Role	Name
Manager	(Russia) Rolan Gusev
Assistant managers	(Russia) Roman Sharonov (Russia) Yuri Zhirkov
Goalkeeping coach	(Russia) Dmitry Izotov
Conditioning coach	(Russia) Ivan Karandashov
Rehabilitation coach	(Russia) Artur Saveljev
Chief analyst	(Russia) Aleksey Radevich
Team manager	(Russia) Yevgeny Kozlov
Press office	(Russia) Kristina Kessler
Chief doctor	(Russia) Mikhail Butovsky
Physiotherapist	(Slovenia) Matija Majzen
Dynamo-2 Moscow head coach	(Russia) Pavel Alpatov

=== Former head coaches ===
FC Dynamo Moscow coaching history from 1936 to present
- (Soviet Union) Konstantin Kvashnin (1936)
- (Soviet Union) Viktor Dubinin (1937)
- (Soviet Union) Mikhail Tovarovsky (1938)
- (Soviet Union) Viktor Dubinin (1939)
- (Soviet Union) Viktor Teterin (1939)
- (Soviet Union) Lev Korchebokov (1939)
- (Soviet Union) Boris Arkadyev (1940–44)
- (Soviet Union) Lev Korchebokov (1944)
- (Soviet Union) Mikhail Yakushin (1944–50)
- (Soviet Union) Viktor Dubinin (1950–51)
- (Soviet Union) Mikhail Semichastny (1952–53)
- (Soviet Union) Mikhail Yakushin (1953–60)
- (Soviet Union) Vsevolod Blinkov (1961)
- (Soviet Union) Aleksandr Ponomaryov (1962–65)
- (Soviet Union) Vyacheslav Solovyov (1965–66)
- (Soviet Union) Konstantin Beskov (1967–72)
- (Soviet Union) Gavriil Kachalin (1973–74)
- (Soviet Union) Aleksandr Sevidov (1975–79)
- (Soviet Union) Viktor Tsaryov (1979)
- (Soviet Union) Yevgeny Goryansky (1980)
- (Soviet Union) Vyacheslav Solovyov (1980–83)
- (Soviet Union) Vadim Ivanov (1983)
- (Soviet Union) Aleksandr Sevidov (1983–85)
- (Soviet Union) Eduard Malofeyev (7 Jun 1985 – 1 Nov 1987)
- (Soviet Union) Anatoliy Byshovets (3 Nov 1987 – 12 Jul 1990)
- (Soviet Union) Semyon Altman (13 Jul 1990 – 1 Apr 1991)
- (Soviet Union) (Russia) Valery Gazzaev (3 Apr 1991 – 15 Sep 1993)
- (Russia) Adamas Golodets (1993)
- (Russia) Konstantin Beskov (1 Jan 1994 – 1 Sep 1995)
- (Russia) Adamas Golodets (1995–98)
- (Russia) Georgi Yartsev (16 Jun 1998 – 14 Jun 1999)
- (Russia) Aleksei Petrushin (18 Jun 1999 – 31 Dec 1999)
- (Russia) Valery Gazzaev (1 Jan 2000 – 15 April 2001)
- (Russia) Aleksandr Novikov (2001–02)
- (Ukraine) Viktor Prokopenko (6 April 2002 – 2 Nov 2003)
- (Russia) Sergei Silkin (caretaker) (3 Nov 2003 – 31 Dec 2003)
- (Czech Republic) Jaroslav Hřebík (1 Jan 2004 – 12 Jul 2004)
- (Russia) Viktor Bondarenko (2004)
- (Russia) Oleg Romantsev (4 Nov 2004 – 18 May 2005)
- (Russia) Andrei Kobelev (caretaker) (18 May 2005 – 8 Jul 2005)
- (Brazil) Ivo Wortmann (8 Jul 2005 – 11 Nov 2005)
- (Russia) Yuri Semin (11 Nov 2005 – 6 Aug 2006)
- (Russia) Andrei Kobelev (8 Aug 2006 – 27 Apr 2010)
- (Montenegro) Miodrag Božović (27 Apr 2010 – 21 Apr 2011)
- (Russia) Sergei Silkin (caretaker) (21 Apr 2011 – 21 Jun 2011)
- (Russia) Sergei Silkin (21 June 2011 – 6 Aug 2012)
- (Russia) Dmitri Khokhlov (caretaker) (6 Aug 2012 – 18 Aug 2012)
- (Romania) Dan Petrescu (18 Aug 2012 – 8 Apr 2014)
- (Russia) Stanislav Cherchesov (10 Apr 2014 – 13 Jul 2015)
- (Russia) Andrei Kobelev (13 Jul 2015 – 10 May 2016)
- (Russia) Sergei Chikishev (caretaker) (10 May 2016 – 6 Jun 2016)
- (Ukraine) Yuriy Kalitvintsev (6 Jun 2016 – 7 Oct 2017)
- (Russia) Dmitri Khokhlov (7 Oct 2017 – 5 Oct 2019)
- (Russia) Kirill Novikov (8 Oct 2019 – 29 Sep 2020)
- (Belarus) Alyaksandr Kulchy (caretaker) (29 Sep 2020 – 14 Oct 2020)
- (Germany) Sandro Schwarz (14 Oct 2020 – 29 May 2022)
- (Serbia) Slaviša Jokanović (17 Jun 2022 – 14 May 2023)
- (Russia) Pavel Alpatov (caretaker) (15 May 2023 – 21 Jun 2023)
- (Czech Republic) Marcel Lička (22 Jun 2023 – 1 May 2025)
- (Russia) Rolan Gusev (caretaker) (1 May 2025 – 12 June 2025)
- (Russia) Valery Karpin (13 June 2025 – 16 November 2025)
- (Russia) Rolan Gusev (caretaker) (17 November 2025 – present)

==== Gallery ====
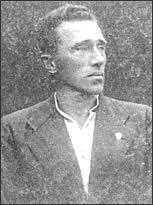
Boris Arkadyev

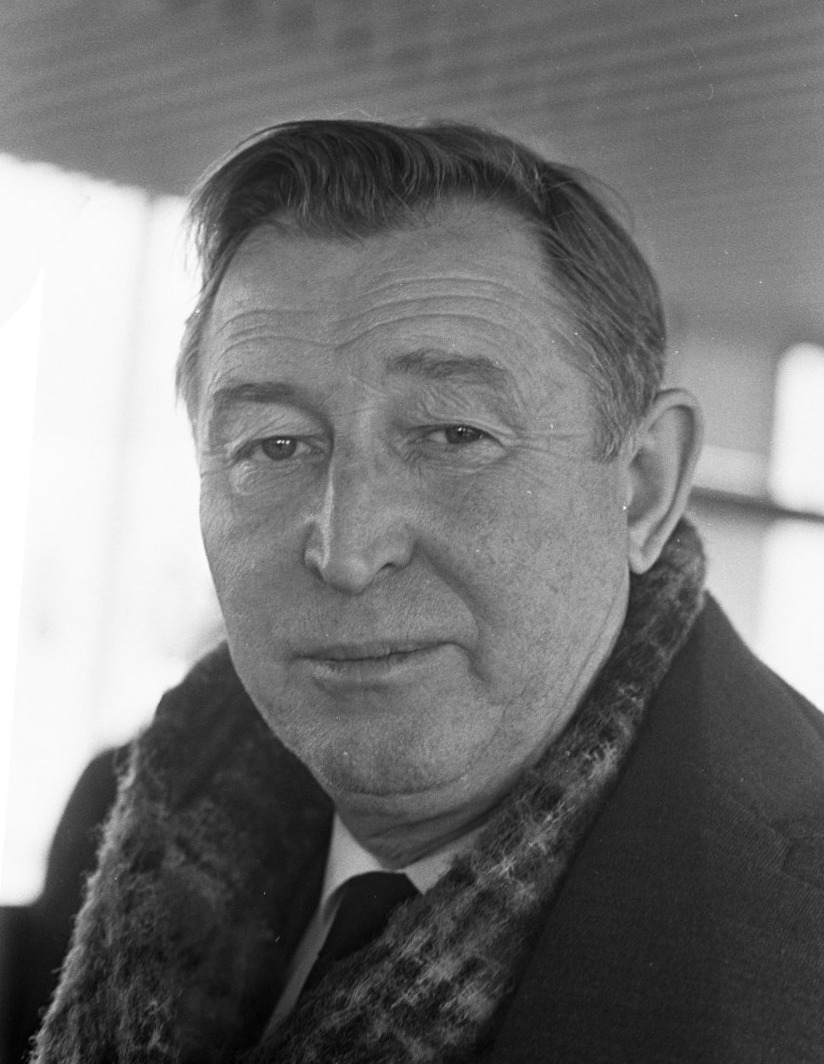
Mikhail Yakushin

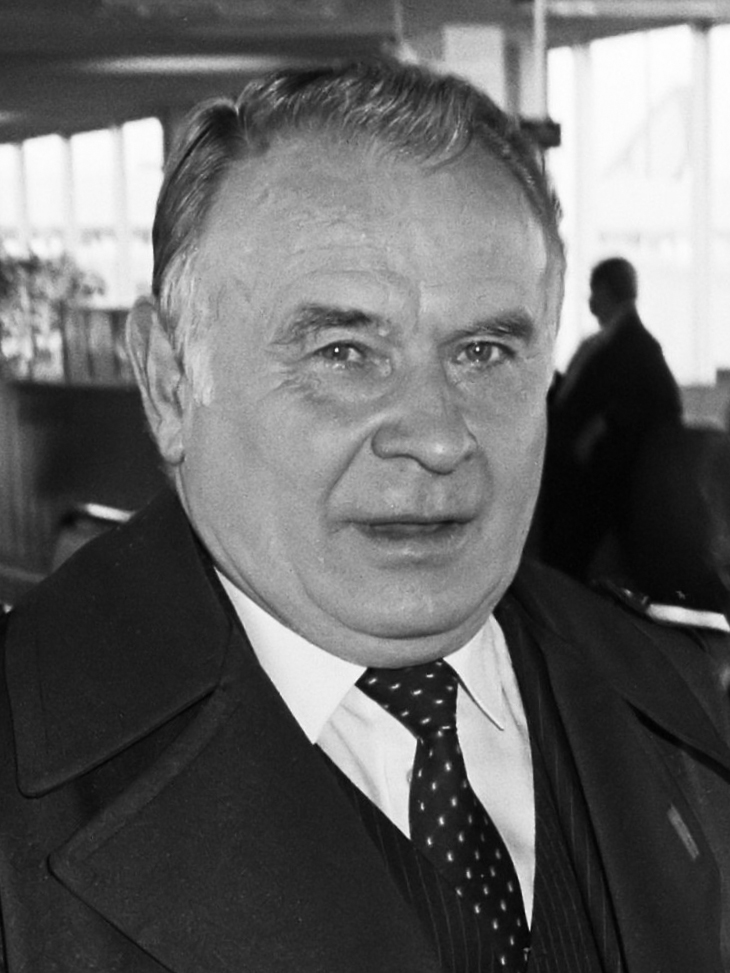
Konstantin Beskov

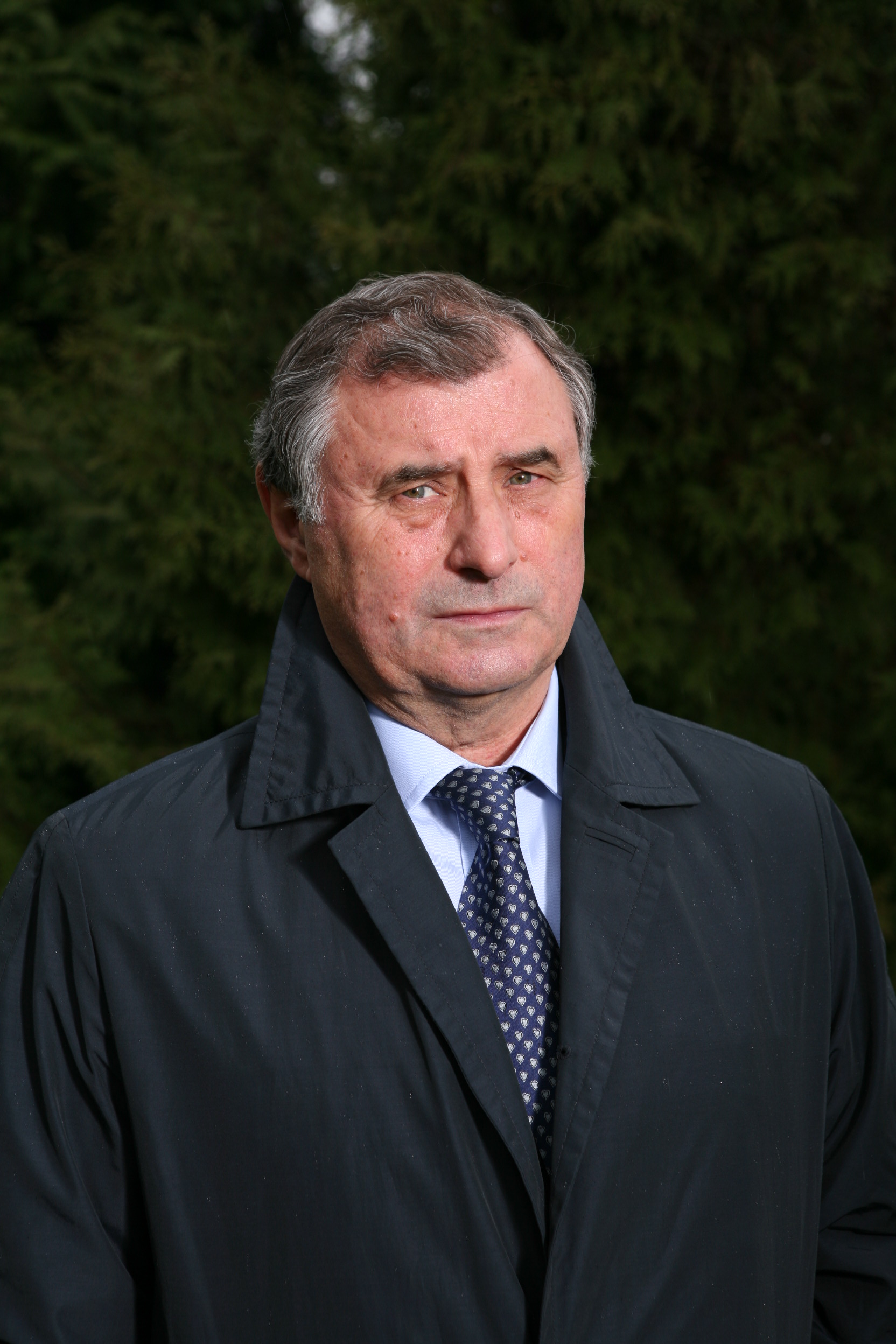
Anatoliy Byshovets

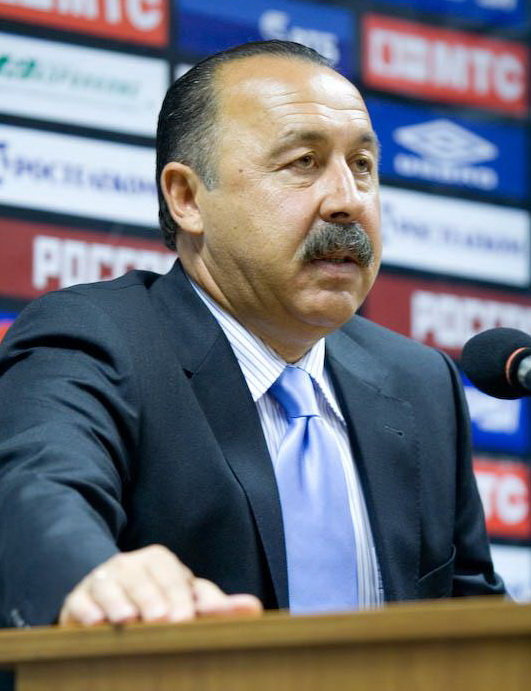
Valery Gazzaev

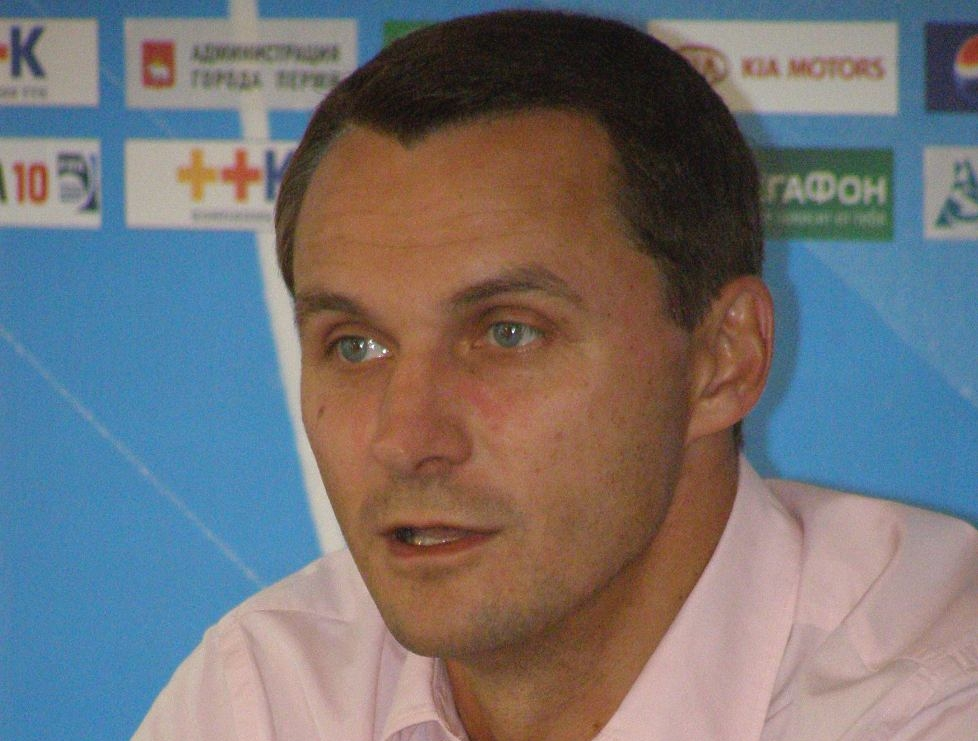
Andrei Kobelev

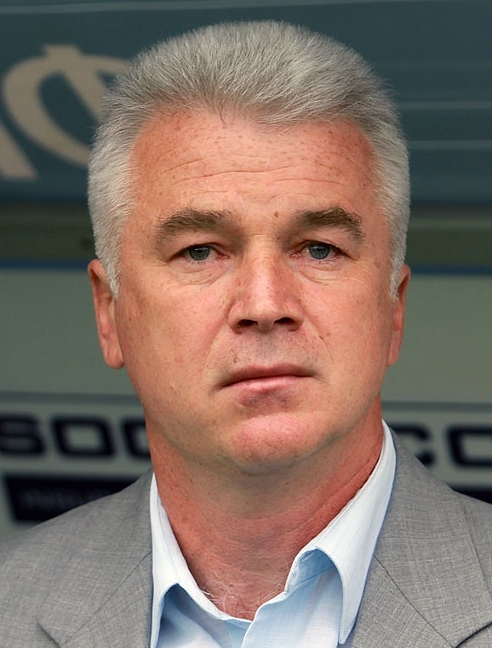
Sergei Silkin

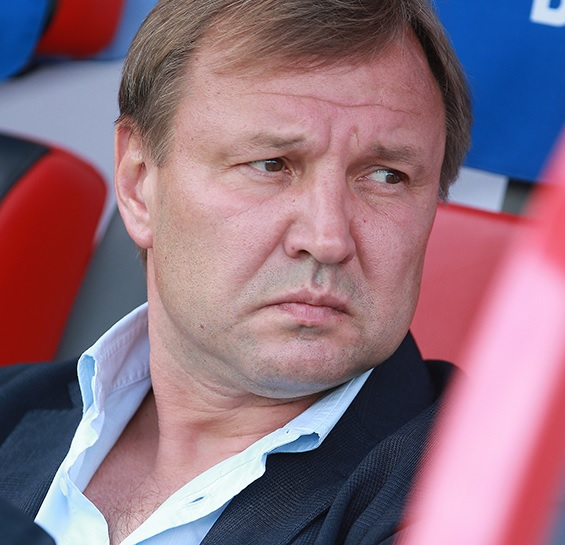
Yuriy Kalitvintsev

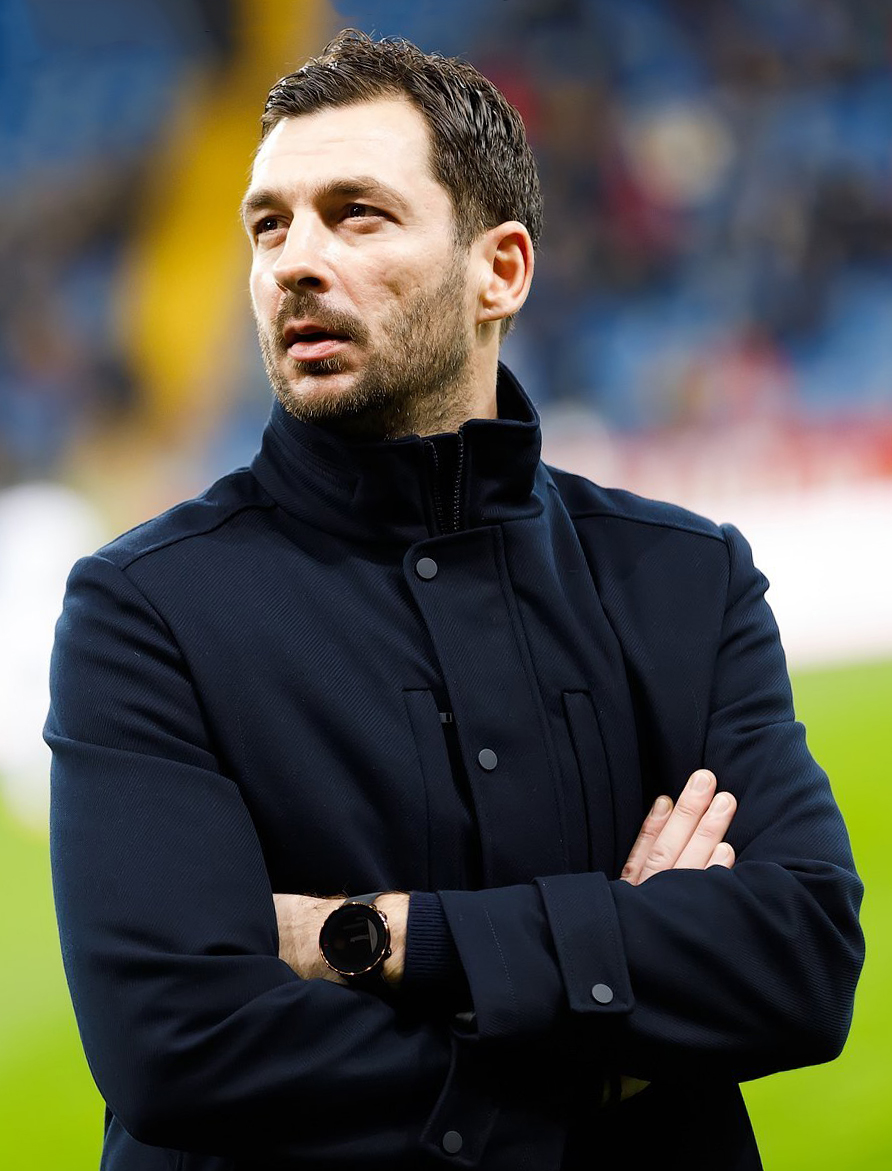
Sandro Schwarz

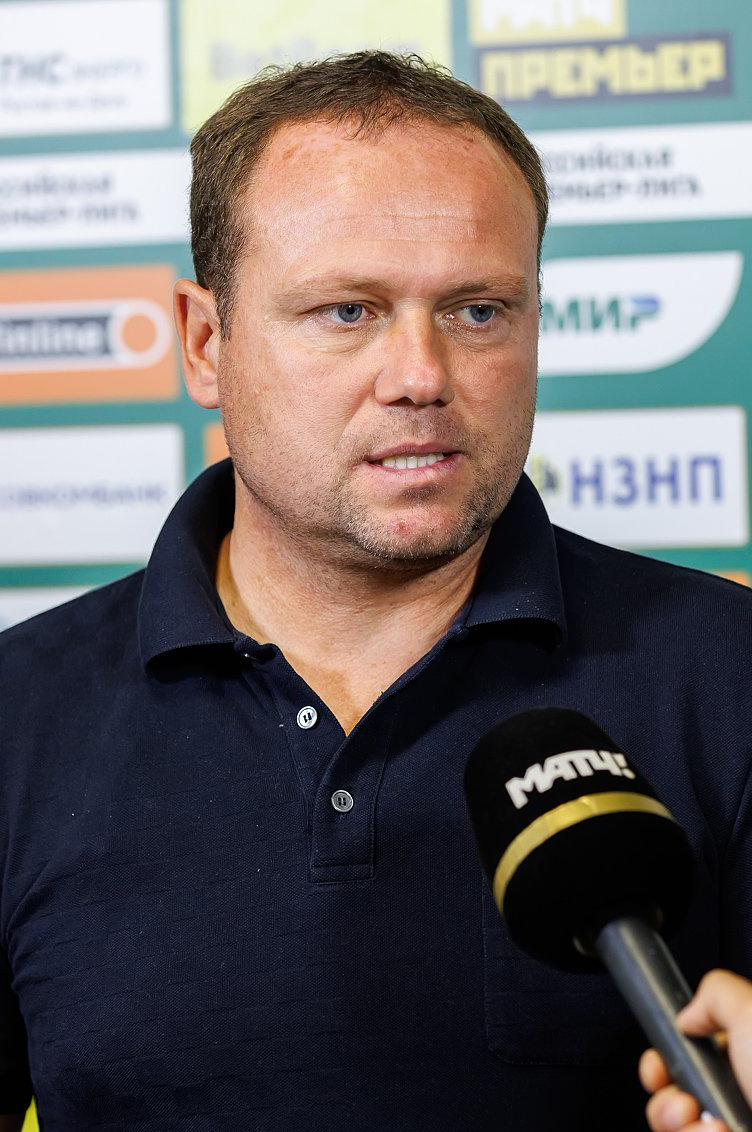
Marcel Lička

== Personnel ==
=== Club management ===
Role	Name
Chairman of the Board of directors	(Russia) Yuri Soloviev
General Director	(Russia) Pavel Pivovarov
Director of sports projects development	(Russia) Alexander Udaltsov
Sporting Director	(Bosnia and Herzegovina) Željko Buvač
Security Director	(Russia) Pavel Konovalov

=== Presidents ===
In the Dynamo organization, the position of "president" has not always been present; several times the head of the club was titled as "chief executive officer (CEO)," or general director.

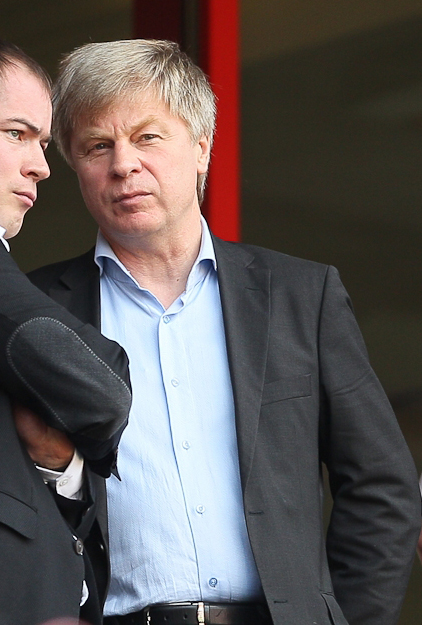
Nikolai Tolstykh, president of Russian Football Union in 2012–2015. Tolstykh played his entire professional career for Dynamo from 1974 to his retirement in 1983 after a serious injury. After retiring, he served as the team's president and general director on numerous occasions.

Date	Position/name
President
1989–90	(Soviet Union) Vladimir Pilguy
President
1991–92	(Russia) Valery Sysoyev
1993–97	(Russia) Nikolai Tolstykh
General director
1998	(Russia) Nikolai Tolstykh
President
1999	(Russia) Nikolai Tolstykh
General director
2000–01	(Russia) Nikolai Tolstykh
2002	(Russia) Vladimir Ulyanov
2002–06	(Russia) Yuri Zavarzin
2006–09	(Russia) Dmitry Ivanov
President
2009–12	(Russia) Yury Isayev
2012–13	(Russia) Gennady Solovyov
2013–15	(Russia) Boris Rotenberg
Club president
2015–16	(Russia) Vasily Titov
2016	(Russia) Vladimir Pronichev
General director
2016–18	(Russia) Yevgeni Muravyov
2018–19	(Russia) Sergei Fedorov
2019–21	(Russia) Yuri Belkin
2021-	(Russia) Pavel Pivovarov
