= FC Dynamo-2 Moscow =

- Full name: Football Club Dynamo-2 Moscow
- Founded: 1986
- Manager: Kirill Panchenko
- League: Russian Second League, Division A, Silver Group
- 2026–27: First stage: 6th
- Website: d2.fcdynamo.ru
Home colours	Away colours

FC Dynamo-2 Moscow (Russian: «Динамо-2» (Москва)) is a Russian football team from Moscow. It is the farm-club for FC Dynamo Moscow.

== History ==
In 2016, it was revived after the parent club, Dynamo, was relegated from the Russian Premier League (which holds its own competition for the Under-21 teams of the Premier League clubs) and licensed to play in the third-tier Russian Professional Football League for the 2016–17 season.

Majority of the squad participated in the 2016–17 UEFA Youth League as well.

On 17 June 2017, the parent club announced that, following Dynamo's return to the Premier League, the reserves squad will now again play in the youth tournament conducted by the Premier League, and the separate professional Dynamo-2 squad is therefore dissolved.

For the 2020–21 season, the team re-entered the Russian Professional Football League once again.

The team previously played on the professional levels as FC Dynamo-d Moscow (Russian Second League in 1992–1993, Russian Third League in 1994–1997) and FC Dynamo-2 Moscow (Russian Second Division in 1998–2000). A separate team called FC Dynamo-2 Moscow (but de facto a third squad) played in the Soviet Second League in 1986–1989, Soviet Second League B in 1990–1991, Russian Second League in 1992–1993 and Russian Third League in 1994–1997.

== Current squad ==
As of 11 September 2026, according to the Second League website.

Note: Flags indicate national team as defined under FIFA eligibility rules; some limited exceptions apply. Players may hold more than one non-FIFA nationality.

No.	Pos.	Nation	Player
1	GK	RUS	Kurban Rasulov
37	DF	RUS	Vitaly Letechin
41	DF	RUS	Arseny Khvalko
42	DF	RUS	Artyom Shpinkov
43	MF	RUS	Pavel Gulin
46	DF	RUS	Roman Bosov
48	DF	RUS	Daniil Zavarzin
50	DF	RUS	Aleksandr Kutitsky
51	GK	RUS	Ruslan Dzhioyev
53	DF	RUS	Vladislav Kudryavtsev
54	DF	RUS	Ivan Lisovsky
56	DF	RUS	Leon Zaydenzal
58	MF	RUS	Artyom Lisovsky
59	FW	RUS	Vladislav Stepanov
60	MF	RUS	Timofey Marinkin
62	MF	RUS	Islam Dashdemirov
63	FW	RUS	Gadzhimagomed Khalilulayev
64	MF	RUS	Vyacheslav Yarosh
65	MF	RUS	Vladimir Ivanov
67	DF	RUS	Daniil Cherkasov
68	DF	RUS	Georgy Tikhomirov

No.	Pos.	Nation	Player
71	MF	RUS	Artyom Zmeyev
72	FW	RUS	Ivan Zhunayev
73	DF	RUS	Yegor Lemkin
76	FW	RUS	Nikita Ranchenkov
78	DF	RUS	Danil Avramenko
79	DF	RUS	Aleksandr Lubnin
81	MF	RUS	Danila Popkov
82	GK	RUS	Aleksandr Shirov
83	DF	RUS	Timur Korchagin
84	GK	RUS	Adel Sorokin
85	GK	RUS	Aleksandr Temirov
86	FW	RUS	Kirill Krasnokhod
87	FW	BLR	Ilya Gubarevich
88	MF	RUS	Viktor Okishor
90	MF	RUS	Arseny Abdulkhalikov
92	DF	RUS	Daniil Tushich
94	MF	RUS	Andrey Mikhaylenko
95	FW	RUS	Ivan Sirotkin
96	MF	RUS	Daniil Golovskoy
97	MF	RUS	Daniil Promoshkin
98	DF	RUS	Stepan Laskin
