= FC Dynamo Moscow's 1945 tour of the United Kingdom =

Tour of a Soviet football club

Dynamo Moscow's 1945 tour of the United Kingdom
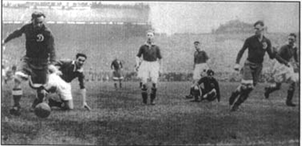
- Dynamo Moscow facing Rangers at Ibrox Park in November 1945
- Date: 13–28 November 1945
- Venue: Various
- Location: United Kingdom
- Type: Exhibition games
- Theme: Association football
- Participants: FC Dynamo Moscow; Chelsea; Cardiff City; Arsenal; Rangers

In November 1945, Soviet football club Dynamo Moscow embarked on an exhibition tour of the United Kingdom following the end of World War II. The tour, which marked the first time a Soviet team had ever played in the United Kingdom, saw them face four clubs from across England, Wales, and Scotland, namely Chelsea, Cardiff City, Arsenal, and Rangers.

Despite early issues with arrangements, the official fixture list for the tour was released on 6 November with three confirmed matches, alongside the possibility of a fourth. The first match saw Dynamo Moscow draw 3–3 at Stamford Bridge against Chelsea in a game labelled as the "match of the century", that broke the attendance record for a British club football match at the time. Four days later, they travelled to Cardiff shortly after the city received a royal visit, where they won 10–1 against Cardiff City, marking one of the heaviest defeats a British side had suffered against foreign opposition.

The third match of the tour saw them return to London to face Arsenal at White Hart Lane. Due to many players still serving overseas following World War II, Arsenal brought in several guest players, notably Stoke City winger Stanley Matthews and Blackpool striker Stan Mortensen, causing Dynamo players to claim that the team was closer to a representative England team. The visibility of the match was impacted heavily by a pea soup fog that had rolled in, and although Dynamo won 4–3, the match was called "one of the most exciting games 54,000 people never saw" by the Daily Mail.

The fourth match of the tour against Rangers almost didn't go ahead, after a disagreement over the transfer of Jimmy Caskie from Everton saw Dynamo threaten to return to London if he was included in Rangers' squad. After settling the issue, the match went ahead, resulting in a 2–2 draw, including a controversial penalty awarded to Rangers near the end of the match. A fifth match for the tour had been arranged against an England Select XI at Villa Park, although it was not played as the team was summoned back to Moscow, where they were hailed as national heroes.

== Background ==
Three months after the surrender of Japan at the end of World War II, the British government extended an invitation to the Soviet Union to send a football club to do an exhibition tour of the country following the Allies's victory in the war, with the Soviets sending 1945 Soviet Top League winners Dynamo Moscow. Immediately after their defeat to CDKA Moscow in the 1945 Soviet Cup final, Dynamo manager Mikhail Yakushin was summoned to the Kremlin, where he learned about the proposal for the first time, and was given a few weeks to prepare for it. This tour marked the first time either a Russian or Soviet team had ever played a match in the United Kingdom.

However, as post-war relations between both countries began to deteriorate, the Foreign Office believed that "it would take much more than a football match to break down the real barriers which the Soviet government firmly believe in". They tried to have the tour cancelled, but following pressure from the British embassy in Moscow, they allowed it to take place, choosing instead to distance themselves and present Dynamo Moscow as guests of the Football Association (FA).

== The tour ==
The tour's announcement was first reported by both the Daily Mirror and Daily Express on 26 October 1945, with the team intending to arrive in the United Kingdom the following week. The first team to offer a match with Dynamo was Chelsea, who had been suggested to face Dynamo after the assistant to the All-Union Council on Physical Culture and Sports attended one of Chelsea's league matches.

Initially, Dynamo Moscow's departure from Moscow was announced on 31 October, with a match against Chelsea scheduled for the following week, but the team's arrival was delayed due to difficulties with releasing some of the players from their factory jobs. Their arrival was delayed again a few days later due to weather conditions, forcing the Chelsea match to be pushed back a week. After additional issues with visas, they eventually arrived in two Douglas C-47 Skytrain "Dakotas" at Croydon Airport on 4 November, following an 11-hour flight, where they were met by FA secretary Stanley Rous and members of the Soviet Embassy in London. Their squad for the tour included three guest players, being Vsevolod Bobrov from CDKA Moscow and both Yevgeniy Archangelski and Boris Oreshkin from Dynamo Leningrad.

The team's delayed arrival caused issues with their hotel accommodations, which had been set up by the FA, with the federation booking most of the squad into the Wellington Barracks in London upon their arrival. Although Dynamo Moscow manager Mikhail Yakushin initially understood why the team were accommodated there, the players considered the barracks not good enough for them, as the federation neglected to ensure that it had pillows, sheets, or running water, resulting in the squad splitting into small groups to find hotel accommodations instead. After hearing about the conditions, Rous and the federation helped resolve the issue quickly, booking them into the Imperial Hotel.

Provisional fixture lists for the tour included matches against Chelsea on 7 November, either Port Vale or Bournemouth & Boscombe Athletic on 10 November, Birmingham City on 14 November, a match on 17 November, and Arsenal on 19 November, before travelling up to Scotland for a match on 21 or 22 November to end the tour. Before the schedule was finalized after their accommodation issues were solved, Dynamo Moscow made a 14-point charter of demands for how it would play out, including that all scheduled matches be against professional clubs, with one match specifically against Arsenal, as well as not having to wear shirt numbers, being allowed at least one substitution, that all team meals must occur in the Soviet Embassy, and that revenue from the tour would be split 50/50. Following negotiations, which included agreeing to use shirt numbers, a three-match schedule was agreed, alongside the option of discussions for a fourth match afterwards. The final fixture list for the tour was released on 6 November, with matches scheduled against Chelsea on 13 November, Cardiff City on 17 November, and Arsenal at White Hart Lane on 21 November.

Prior to the Dynamo Moscow's arrival, most people in the country knew nothing about the team, the only exceptions being some print journalists who were permitted to attend the club's training sessions. However, the British press were unconcerned about their ability, with some reporting to not expect much of the team, and The Evening Standard claiming that they were "only beginners, blue-collars, amateurs." However, despite the reports of the squad not being professionals, the club later clarified after the tour that they were considered neither amateur nor professional under the FA's interpretation of professionalism.

=== Chelsea ===
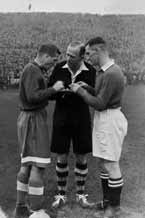
Club captains John Harris (left) and Mikhail Semichastny (right) prior to kick-off

The match between Dynamo Moscow and Chelsea was the first one proposed for the tour. Originally scheduled for 7 November at Stamford Bridge, it was later pushed back to 13 November. Prior to the match being rescheduled, Radio Moscow spent £92 on a 23-minute phone call with Chelsea manager Billy Birrell to seek information about the club history and its players. On 8 November, Chelsea announced the signing of England international Tommy Lawton from Everton for a reported fee of £14,000, a club-record signing at the time, and that he would be included in their squad for the match against Dynamo. To strengthen their squad further, they also brought in two guest players from Fulham, being Joe Bacuzzi and Jim Taylor.

While in London, Dynamo Moscow trained at White City Stadium. Their first training session was attended by Birrell, who was surprised by their quality and later praised the squad's ability. Near the end of training on 9 November, Dynamo captain Mikhail Semichastny was injured after being kicked in the leg during a tackle against him, although the injury didn't rule him out of the match. Later that night, the squad attended their first performance in the country, being a production of A Night In Venice at Cambridge Theatre. The following day, the Dynamo Moscow squad attended Chelsea's match against Birmingham City, where they were impressed by Lawton's jumping and heading ability.

The official attendance for the match was 74,496, but it was reported that between 85,000 to 100,000 spectators actually watched the match, making it the largest crowd ever for a club match in the United Kingdom at the time. Many spectators queued as long as five and a half hours for tickets, while some who were not able to purchase them climbed onto the stadium's roof to get a better view, with at least two people falling through the roof's glass onto other spectators, and one person later filing a lawsuit against the club the following year after a shard of falling glass cut his nose. Additionally, there were reports of people breaking the doors of nearby houses to try and get to the roofs in order to watch the match.

The referee chosen for the match was lieutenant-commander George Clark, who had served on the HMS Malaya during World War II, and officiated matches between army teams and Spanish and West African clubs, as well as a Football League War Cup final replay. Around fifteen minutes before the match started, the Dynamo players began practicing repetitive drills on the pitch, bemusing the Chelsea fans in the crowd who thought they were wasting their energy. Right before the match started, the Soviet players presented each of their opponents with red and white bouquets of flowers, as was considered normal in the Soviet Top League. However, the Chelsea players were seemingly embarrassed by the tradition, handing the flowers to a club official before the national anthems were played, while Chelsea fans saw it as bizarre, with one shouting "What's this then, Chelsea's funeral?"

==== Match summary ====
Early on, Chelsea struggled to cope with Dynamo's pass-and-move style, with Chelsea goalkeeper Vic Woodley having to make three close range saves in the first two minutes. By the first 20 minutes, the Soviet side had made six shots, with four being saved and two hitting the post. However, Chelsea were able to take the lead in the 22nd minute, after Len Goulden scored the rebound of Lawton's shot from a Jimmy Bain corner. They doubled their lead six minutes later, when Reg Williams capitalized on a defensive mix-up to score. In the 41st minute, Dynamo were awarded a penalty after a sliding tackle by Bobby Russell, which Leonid Solovyov missed by hitting the post.

Dynamo began to play better in the second half, and scored their first goal in the 67th minute, thanks to a 25-yard shot from Vasili Kartsev. Six minutes later, Kartsev went down the right wing, before cutting it inside to Yevgeniy Archangelski, who scored to make it 2–2. However, Chelsea were able to regain their lead in the 81st minute, following a header from Lawton, but Dynamo drew level again within two minutes, after Vsevolod Radikorsky won the ball and passed it to Archangelski who crossed it, deflecting off a Chelsea player and landing to Vsevolod Bobrov, who scored from five yards out.

Following the match, thousands of fans swarmed the pitch, with several trying to carry the Dynamo players into the tunnel and dressing room. Later, Lawton called Dynamo one of the fastest teams he had seen in his life, while Chelsea captain John Harris praised the performance of goalkeeper Alexei Khomich. The day after the match, Dynamo Moscow invited Chelsea to tour the Soviet Union after the 1945–46 season when they met at the reception of the Hotel Café Royal. Afterwards, journalist John Graydon labeled the match as the "match of the century", and in March 2025, The Athletic called it Chelsea's most important match of the 1940s.

==== Details ====
13 November 1945

Chelsea (England)	3–3	(Soviet Union) Dynamo Moscow
Goulden 22'; Williams 28'; Lawton 81'		Kartsev 67'; Archangelski 73'; Bobrov 83'

Stamford Bridge, London
Attendance: 74,496
Referee: George Clark (England)

GK	(England) Vic Woodley
FB	(England) Albert Tennant
FB	(England) Joe Bacuzzi (Fulham)
HB	(Scotland) Bobby Russell
HB	(Scotland) John Harris (c)
HB	(England) Jim Taylor (Fulham)
OR	(Scotland) Peter Buchanan
IR	(England) Reg Williams
CF	(England) Tommy Lawton
IL	(England) Len Goulden
OL	(Scotland) Jimmy Bain
Manager:
(Scotland) Billy Birrell

GK	(Soviet Union) Alexei Khomich
FB	(Soviet Union) Vsevolod Radikorsky
FB	(Soviet Union) Ivan Stankevich
HB	(Soviet Union) Vsevolod Blinkov
HB	(Soviet Union) Mikhail Semichastny (c)
HB	(Soviet Union) Leonid Solovyov
OR	(Soviet Union) Yevgeniy Archangelski (Dynamo Leningrad)
IR	(Soviet Union) Vasili Kartsev
CF	(Soviet Union) Konstantin Beskov
IL	(Soviet Union) Vsevolod Bobrov (CDKA Moscow)
OL	(Soviet Union) Sergey Solovyov
Manager:
(Soviet Union) Mikhail Yakushin

=== Cardiff City ===
Due to the FA's refusal to change any of the Saturday fixtures for England's top teams, only Third Division South side Cardiff City were able to host Dynamo Moscow. Originally, Cardiff had scheduled a friendly against Chester City for 17 November, but the match was cancelled in favour of having them face the Soviets. Following the match against Chelsea, Dynamo took a day off to sightsee around London, before departing from London Paddington station to Cardiff on 15 November, where they were given an enthusiastic send off by the crowd on the platform. However, they made the journey without Aleksandr Malyavkin, who had been admitted to Westminster Hospital with jaundice.

In the days prior to their arrival, Cardiff had been the subject of a royal visit by King George VI and Queen Elizabeth, so the city's main railway station was already decorated with bunting and flags, which was kept up to greet the Soviet side. Shortly after the royals had left, a flag featuring a hammer and sickle was hoisted above Cardiff City Hall to complete the welcome. The team spent 16 November divided across Wales, with 12 members visiting a coal mine in Abercynon, another group attending a reception given by the Lord Mayor of Cardiff at the Cardiff City Hall, and a third group touring Cardiff Docks, before regrouping at Ninian Park to train that afternoon. While at Cardiff City Hall, members of the team signed a visitors' book which the King and Queen had signed during their visit, with some players reportedly thrilled to have their names so close to the royals'.

The morning of the match, some members of the squad continued their sightseeing, visiting the Treforest Trading Estate. Due to the high likelihood of a record crowd at Ninian Park, Cardiff City Police called in over 300 reserves to cope with the expected demand. Additionally, the club had ordered several layers of cart grease to be applied to the stand supports, in order to prevent people from climbing onto the stadium's roof as during the match against Chelsea. Prior to kickoff, after handing Cardiff City captain Fred Stansfield a bouquet of flowers, the club presented each Dynamo player with a miniature commemorative miner's lamp, with one ending up on display in the club's museum.

==== Match summary ====
Almost immediately, Cardiff City went on the offensive thanks to Beriah Moore and Ernie Carless, with Khomich saving a long shot from Marsh Raybould. Dynamo Moscow took the lead in the 7th minute, after a free kick (Note: Reports on what player took the free kick varies, with the Sunday Express reporting it was Yevgeniy Archangelski, while others reported it was Vsevolod Radikorsky.) was headed in by Vsevolod Bobrov. Three minutes later, Dynamo doubled their lead, after Bobrov drew Stansfield away to set up Konstantin Beskov, who scored from 12 yards out. Despite Cardiff's best efforts to go on the offense, Dynamo went 3–0 up in the 26th minute after Archangelski got the ball from a Cardiff defender and beat Kevin McLoughlin.

In the second half, a total of six goals were scored in the span of 15 minutes. The first of these came from Bobrov in the 54th minute to make it 4–0, before he scored again six minutes later. Afterwards, four goals were scored in the span of five minutes, with Archangelski, Beskov, and Bobrov all scoring for Dynamo, before Moore scored Cardiff City's first goal of the match in the 65th minute. After Moore's goal, Cardiff were awarded a penalty, although Terry Wood's shot was saved by Khomich. Beskov then scored Dynamo's ninth goal in the 82nd minute, before Archangelski scored the tenth six minutes later. This result marked one of the heaviest defeats suffered by a British side against foreign opposition.

After the match, Cardiff City manager Cyril Spiers called Dynamo Moscow one of the finest teams he had ever seen. However, there was some doubt over if Khomich would play in Dynamo's next match, after jarring his wrist while saving Wood's penalty, although he revealed he was fine just two days before they faced Arsenal.

==== Details ====
17 November 1945
14:45 GMT

Cardiff City (Wales)	1–10	(Soviet Union) Dynamo Moscow
Moore 65'		Bobrov 7', 54', 60', 64'; Beskov 10', 64', 82'; Archangelski 26', 61', 88'

Ninian Park, Cardiff
Attendance: 40,000
Referee: A. E. Davies (Wales)

GK	(Wales) Kevin McLoughlin
FB	(Wales) Arthur Lever
FB	(Wales) Marsh Raybould
HB	(Wales) Ken Hollyman
HB	(Wales) Fred Stansfield (c)
HB	(Wales) Danny Lester
OR	(Wales) Beriah Moore
IR	(Wales) Ernie Carless
CF	(England) Colin Gibson
IL	(Wales) Terry Wood
OL	(Wales) Roy Clarke
Manager:
(England) Cyril Spiers

GK	(Soviet Union) Alexei Khomich
FB	(Soviet Union) Vsevolod Radikorsky
FB	(Soviet Union) Ivan Stankevich
HB	(Soviet Union) Vsevolod Blinkov
HB	(Soviet Union) Mikhail Semichastny (c)
HB	(Soviet Union) Leonid Solovyov
OR	(Soviet Union) Yevgeniy Archangelski (Dynamo Leningrad)
IR	(Soviet Union) Vasili Kartsev
CF	(Soviet Union) Konstantin Beskov
IL	(Soviet Union) Vsevolod Bobrov (CDKA Moscow)
OL	(Soviet Union) Sergey Solovyov
Manager:
(Soviet Union) Mikhail Yakushin

=== Arsenal ===
The match against Arsenal had been requested by Dynamo Moscow in their demands for the tour. Due to the suspicion of possible match-fixing, Dynamo insisted that it be officiated by Soviet referee Nikolay Latyshev, who later officiated the 1962 FIFA World Cup final between Brazil and Czechoslovakia, which Arsenal manager George Allison accepted. Additionally, the match was played at White Hart Lane, home of North London rivals Tottenham Hotspur, instead of Highbury as it was still occupied by the Ministry of Defence following its use as an air raid precaution centre during World War II.

At the time, Arsenal were missing 46 players who were still serving with the British Armed Forces, of which 44 were stationed overseas, resulting in the club reaching out to those players to return for the match, including captain Eddie Hapgood, Leslie Compton, Bernard Joy, and Reg Lewis. Although they were denied permission to recall multiple players, (Note: The list of known players that were denied include Leslie Compton, Reg Lewis, George Marks, George Male, Bryn Jones, Alf Fields, Denis Compton, and George Curtis.) they were given permission for both Joy and Hapgood to return to London for the match. However, Hapgood was unable to return due to fog holding up his plane in Brussels, forcing Arsenal to bring in Joe Bacuzzi from Fulham, who had also featured as a guest for Chelsea earlier in the tour.

On top of Bacuzzi, Arsenal also brought in several other guest players for the match. Originally, Allison had invited Southampton winger Don Roper, but instead ended up securing the service of Stoke City winger Stanley Matthews, then considered the best footballer in England at the time, by the request of a "higher authority" (Note: It is unknown who exactly this "higher authority" refers to, although the Football Association later released a statement clarifying it was not them.) as a compliment to the Soviet side. Other guest players brought in included Stan Mortensen from Blackpool, Reg Halton from Bury, and Wyn Griffiths from Cardiff City. After finding out about the guest players, Dynamo captain Semichastny released a statement claiming the Arsenal side for the match would be closer to a representative England team, but they would still play the match nonetheless.

The match was further complicated by a blanket of fog that had spread across most of South East England, with Dynamo requesting the fixture be postponed. However, the FA were determined to proceed, given the number of tickets sold. The queue for tickets had begun at 5:30, and although only 20 people were in the queue by 7:30, that number had jumped to 3,000 people within 30 minutes. By 10:30, the queue had gotten so large that police ordered the stadium to be opened early, and by the time Latyshev had begun to inspect the pitch conditions midday, there were already an estimated 40,000 people in the stadium.

==== Match summary ====
Arsenal kicked off the match, but Semichastny quickly intercepted the opening move. He sent a lofted pass directly to Sergey Solovyov, who got the ball to Bobrov, allowing him to score past Griffiths from 10 yards out. However, most of the crowd were unable to see the goal, due to the pea soup fog that had begun to cover the stadium, to a degree that Latyshev insisted both of his assistant referees run on the same side of the pitch. Arsenal scored an equalizer in the 15th minute, (Note: Although the exact goalscorer is unconfirmed, multiple reports list Ronnie Rooke as the goalscorer.) and five minutes later, Leonid Solovyov was substituted off with an injury and replaced by Boris Oreshkin, although it would only come to light who exactly was substituted during half-time.

Shortly after the substitution, Griffiths suffered a head injury in a collision, although he was able to resume playing after treatment. In response to the injury, Arsenal sent an SOS broadcast over the stadium's loudspeaker for backup goalkeeper Harry Brown, who was a guest player from Queens Park Rangers and had been attending the match as a spectator, to report to the club's dressing room. Arsenal went 2–1 up in the 27th minute, after Cliff Bastin and Ronnie Rooke set up Mortensen to score with a powerful right-footed shot, before making it 3–1 thirty seconds later after Matthews dribbled past the Dynamo defenders, before crossing it to Mortensen. Shortly after, Beskov drifted through Arsenal's defense and score to make it 3–2, as well as making it three goals scored within three minutes.

At half-time, Griffiths, who was now suffering a concussion and unaware of the exact score, was subbed off and replaced by Brown. Three minutes into the second half, Kartsev scored to make it 3–3, despite being offside. Shortly after, Arsenal had a penalty appeal turned down, before Latyshev sent off George Drury for throwing a punch, which he claimed to not understand before slinking away into the fog and returning to the pitch. By this point, visibility at the stadium had reached less than 30 yards.

Dynamo Moscow then took the lead after Solovyov received the ball in an offside position, before passing it to Bobrov, who scored their fourth goal in the 63rd minute. Issues continued after Arsenal had a goal disallowed that they considered perfectly fair. Shortly after, Rooke got the ball 40 yards from the goal, and began running at speed, before Semichastny rugby tackled him, cutting Rooke's head open in the process. Rooke then threw off Semichastny with an elbow, giving him a black eye, before hitting a pile-driver from 25 yards out that flew past Khomich. However, Latyshev blew his whistle, awarding Dynamo a free kick where the original incident occurred. Near the end of the match, Dynamo were forced to make another substitution, with Vasili Trofimov limping off after a tackle and being replaced by Archangelski.

Despite Allison's suggestion to the Soviet Embassy in London's First Secretary that they concede the game to stop the chaos, his offer was declined, as Dynamo Moscow held onto their lead to win. Following the match, most people in attendance had to wait until the following day's newspaper to find out what the result was, with the Daily Mail reporting that "it was one of the most exciting games 54,000 people never saw."

==== Details ====
21 November 1945
14:15 GMT

Arsenal (England)	3–4	(Soviet Union) Dynamo Moscow
Rooke 15'; Mortensen 27', 27'		Bobrov 1', 63'; Beskov 30'; Kartsev 48'

White Hart Lane, London
Attendance: 54,000
Referee: Nikolay Latyshev (Soviet Union)

GK	(Wales) Wyn Griffiths (Cardiff City)	(substituted off) 45'
FB	(England) Laurie Scott
FB	(England) Joe Bacuzzi (Fulham)
HB	(England) Cliff Bastin
HB	(England) Bernard Joy
HB	(England) Reg Halton (Bury)
OR	(England) Stanley Matthews (Stoke City)
IR	(England) George Drury
CF	(England) Ronnie Rooke (Fulham)
IL	(England) Stan Mortensen (Blackpool)
OL	(Wales) Horace Cumner
Substitutes:
GK	(England) Harry Brown (Queens Park Rangers)	(substituted on) 45'
Manager:
(England) George Allison

GK	(Soviet Union) Alexei Khomich
FB	(Soviet Union) Vsevolod Radikorsky
FB	(Soviet Union) Ivan Stankevich
HB	(Soviet Union) Vsevolod Blinkov
HB	(Soviet Union) Mikhail Semichastny (c)
HB	(Soviet Union) Leonid Solovyov	(substituted off) 20'
OR	(Soviet Union) Vasili Trofimov	Substituted off
IR	(Soviet Union) Vasili Kartsev
CF	(Soviet Union) Konstantin Beskov
IL	(Soviet Union) Vsevolod Bobrov (CDKA Moscow)
OL	(Soviet Union) Sergey Solovyov
Substitutes:
HB	(Soviet Union) Boris Oreshkin (Dynamo Leningrad)	(substituted on) 20'
OR	(Soviet Union) Yevgeniy Archangelski (Dynamo Leningrad)	Substituted on
Manager:
(Soviet Union) Mikhail Yakushin

=== Rangers ===
Prior to the match, there was uncertainty over whether the match would take place, due to winter arriving early and several Dynamo Moscow players agreeing to return home to compete in the Soviet Championship League, the top division of hockey in the Soviet Union. Following the fallout from the Arsenal match putting the tour at risk, a combination of several factors, including British desperation to beat the Soviets and the revenue generated from the previous matches, saw the fourth match of the tour arranged against Scottish club Rangers. In Glasgow, there was a high demand to see the match, resulting in tickets sold for 21 shillings being resold for £10, nearly 10 times the original price. Despite the high prices, a total of 90,000 people attended the match at the Ibrox Stadium. The Dynamo Moscow squad arrived in Glasgow through Glasgow Central station at 6:45 a.m. on 24 November, where they were greeted by Lord Provost of Edinburgh John Ireland Falconer and members of the Glasgow Town Council. That same day, Semichastny, Beskov, Yakushin, and an interpreter from the Soviet Embassy attended Rangers' 1–1 draw with Motherwell at Fir Park.

The match itself nearly didn't go ahead, following a disagreement between both clubs over the transfer of Jimmy Caskie from Everton to Rangers, which was completed on 24 November. Although transfer negotiations began prior to the match being arranged, Dynamo Moscow threatened to return to London if Caskie was included in Rangers' squad for the match. Despite chiefs from the Scottish Football Association stepping in to try and resolve the situation, Dynamo remained firm, claiming they would rather leave the city than play if Caskie was included. In the end, Rangers manager Bill Struth announced that Caskie would not play against Dynamo Moscow, resolving the situation.

==== Match summary ====
It took two minutes for Dynamo to take the lead, when Kartsev scored a free-kick from 22 yards out, with no wall to help defend it. The Soviet side then dominated for the next few minutes, until a Rangers forward (Note: Reports on the exact player vary, with The Daily Dispatch claiming it was Jimmy Smith, while other sources claim it was Billy Williamson.) was fouled, and were awarded a penalty that would later be described as dubious. Willie Waddell took the penalty, smashing it straight at Khomich, before the rebound was cleared by Semichastny.

Dynamo Moscow scored again in the 28th minute, with each forward touching the ball before it was scored by Kartsev. Bobrov, who had been on the edge of the penalty area, was able to draw in two defenders before passing the ball across the box to Beskov. With his left foot, he passed it back to the right between retreating defenders, allowing the unmarked Kartsev to smash the ball low into the opposite corner. The goal was considered the best of the tour, with The Daily Telegraph later saying it was "as perfect a goal as has ever been scored at Ibrox".

Five minutes before half-time, Rangers were able to make it 2–1 when Khomich clashed with Jimmy Smith while trying to catch the ball, with it bouncing off of Smith's midriff into the empty net. In the second half, Rangers began to dominate the match. Later on, Rangers forward Williamson drove the ball into the box from the left wing, and when trying to get past a Dynamo full-back, was taken down and fell heavily in the box. Initially, referee Tommy Thompson awarded Dynamo Moscow a goal kick, but after protests from Rangers players and speaking with linesman Robert Calder, Thompson awarded a penalty. George Young stepped up to take it, and hit it to the left of Khomich to make it 2–2 in the 78th minute. Near the end of the match, a shot from Charlie Watkins struck one of the goal posts, allowing Dynamo to narrowly escape a defeat.

Two substitutions were made during the match, with Nikolay Dementyev coming on for the injured Bobrov, and Jimmy Duncanson replacing Smith, who had taken a nasty tumble. Additionally, Khomich suffered an injury to his fingers during the match.

==== Details ====
28 November 1945

Rangers (Scotland)	2–2	(Soviet Union) Dynamo Moscow
Smith 40'; Young 78' (pen.)		Kartsev 2', 28'

Ibrox Stadium, Glasgow
Attendance: 90,000
Referee: Tommy Thompson (England)

GK	(Scotland) Jerry Dawson
FB	(Scotland) Dougie Gray
FB	(Scotland) Jock Shaw (c)
HB	(Scotland) Charlie Watkins
HB	(Scotland) George Young
HB	(Scotland) Scot Symon
OR	(Scotland) Willie Waddell
IR	(Scotland) Torry Gillick
CF	(Scotland) Jimmy Smith	Substituted off
IL	(Scotland) Billy Williamson
OL	(Scotland) Charlie Johnston
Substitutes:
FW	(Scotland) Jimmy Duncanson	Substituted on
Manager:
(Scotland) Bill Struth

GK	(Soviet Union) Alexei Khomich
FB	(Soviet Union) Vsevolod Radikorsky
FB	(Soviet Union) Ivan Stankevich
HB	(Soviet Union) Vsevolod Blinkov
HB	(Soviet Union) Mikhail Semichastny (c)
HB	(Soviet Union) Boris Oreshkin (Dynamo Leningrad)
OR	(Soviet Union) Yevgeniy Archangelski (Dynamo Leningrad)
IR	(Soviet Union) Vasili Kartsev
CF	(Soviet Union) Konstantin Beskov
IL	(Soviet Union) Vsevolod Bobrov (CDKA Moscow)	Substituted off
OL	(Soviet Union) Sergey Solovyov
Substitutes:
FW	(Soviet Union) Nikolay Dementyev	Substituted on
Manager:
(Soviet Union) Mikhail Yakushin

=== Proposed matches ===
Prior to the match against Rangers, arrangements for a fifth match of the tour had been prepared. On 27 November, Aston Villa secretary W. J. Smith announced that Dynamo Moscow would play a match at Villa Park on or around 5 December, against an unconfirmed opponent, with 70,000 tickets already printed for the match. Shortly after, it was announced that the match would be against an England Select XI. However, on 29 November, Stanley Rous announced that there was little prospect of the match occurring, with it ultimately not being played.

In early plans for the tour, Dynamo Moscow were supposed to face Birmingham City at St Andrew's on 14 November, but delays with their arrival saw the arrangement altered. Despite the efforts of Birmingham City officials to reschedule the match, it was not played. The day after their match against Chelsea, there were reports of the team being set to face a Football Association XI, which did not occur either. Other teams who had offered to face Dynamo Moscow included defending FA Cup champions Portsmouth, Sheffield Wednesday, Tottenham Hotspur, Brentford, Nottingham Forest, Bournemouth & Boscombe Athletic, Port Vale, Manchester City, Coventry City, Gillingham, and Northern Irish club Distillery.

Additionally, European clubs reportedly tried to get Dynamo Moscow to face them on their way back to the Soviet Union, including RC Paris in France and a British Army team stationed in the British occupation zone in Berlin.

== Aftermath ==
After the match against Rangers, the Dynamo Moscow squad returned to London, where they spent the next few days sightseeing around the city. During this time, they were invited by Lord Mayor of London Sir Charles Davis, 1st Baronet for a dinner at Mansion House on 4 December and attended an Army Football Association match between England and Scotland. The team departed London from Northolt Aerodrome in Middlesex at 8:30am on 7 December, heading to Moscow via Berlin. Upon their return to the Soviet Union, the Dynamo squad were hailed as national heroes, with several members of the team being awarded the Master of Sport of the USSR. Additionally, the players were given 10,000 rubles (around £1,000) each, while manager Yakushin received 15,000 rubles (around £1,500) and club captain Semichastny received 12,000 rubles (around £1,200).

On 4 December 1945, it was reported that Dynamo Moscow were hoping to invite English clubs they hadn't faced during the tour to the Soviet Union the following summer, with then-Football League South leaders Charlton Athletic reportedly being one of the teams invited. However, this plan fell through, as a reciprocal visit to the Soviet Union was turned down due to political tensions between the two countries shortly before the Cold War.

=== In popular culture ===
On 14 December 1945, George Orwell published an essay in Tribune titled "The Sporting Spirit". In it, he claimed that "...if such a visit as this had any effect at all on Anglo-Soviet relations, it could only be to make them slightly worse than before" and referred to the tour as "war minus the shooting".

In the Soviet Union, a book celebrating the tour titled 19:9 was published shortly after the squad returned. Additionally, a musical was staged in Moscow relating to the tour, where an English beauty tried to seduce Dynamo's best player the night before a match.

In February 2022, a Russian sports drama film which depicted the events of the tour titled Eleven Silent Men was released in theatres, making over 150 million rubles at the Russian box office. It was originally scheduled to be released in November 2020, to coincide with the tour's 75th anniversary, and following its release, was shown at a film festival in Singapore in December 2022.
