= Eleven Silent Men =

- Theatrical release poster
- Directed by: Alexey Pimanov
- Written by: Oleg Presnyakov; Vladimir Presnyakov
- Produced by: Alexey Pimanov; Dmitry Savinsky; Svetlana Bezgan
- Starring: Makar Zaporozhsky; Pavel Trubiner; Roman Kurtsyn; Andrey Chernyshov; Evgeniya Lapova; Alyona Kolomina; Dmitry Belotzerkovsky
- Cinematography: Maksim Shinkorenko
- Music by: Oleg Volyando
- Production companies: With Pimanov and Partners; Channel One; VTB General Sponsor; Dynamo Moscow; Cinema Fund; AvtoRadio
- Distributed by: Central Partnership
- Release date: February 17, 2022 (Russia)
- Running time: 121 minutes
- Country: Russia
- Languages: Russian, English
- Budget: ₽310.3 million
- Box office: ₽122 million; $1.326.672

Eleven Silent Men (Russian: Одиннадцать молчаливых мужчин, romanized: Odinnadtsat molchalivykh muzhchin) is a 2022 Russian sports drama film directed by Alexey Pimanov's company Pimanov and partners. The film is the story of the legendary trip of Soviet football players "FC Dynamo Moscow" who came to Great Britain in November 1945 to play famous English football clubs. It was with this epithet that British journalists dubbed Soviet athletes in the press. The film stars Makar Zaporozhsky, Pavel Trubiner, Roman Kurtsyn, Andrey Chernyshov, Evgeniya Lapova, Alyona Kolomina, and Dmitry Belotzerkovsky joining the cast.

Eleven Silent Men is scheduled to be theatrically released on February 17, 2022, by Central Partnership.

== Plot ==
In November 1945, players from Football Club Dynamo Moscow travel to London to play a series of matches against British teams, including Chelsea, Arsenal, and Rangers. During the tour, an English correspondent becomes romantically interested in one of the Soviet players. Local bookmakers also become involved in the matches, seeking to profit from the tour. The Dynamo Moscow team attracts significant public attention during its visit to Britain.

A story based on real events, consisting of romance, humor, spy adventures and sports. The football players not only did not lose a single match, but also won the hearts of the English public, repudiating the idea of a Soviet country. "Dynamo" became a symbol of the new world, born on the ruins of the Second World War.

== Cast ==
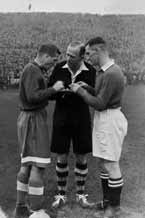
John Harris (Chelsea) and Mikhail Semichastny (Dynamo) at Stamford Bridge on November 13, 1945.

Cast	
Makar Zaporozhsky	Vsevolod Bobrov is a Soviet football player, forward of FC Dynamo Moscow, and bandy player
Alyona Kolomina	Abby, a special correspondent for a number of Western media
Pavel Kraynov	Vadim Sinyavsky, a radio commentator
Evgeniya Lapova	Victoria Strelkova, a diplomat
Andrey Chernyshov	Pepper, a sergeant in the Royal Air Force of Great Britain
Sofya Shutkina	Alexandra "Sasha" Eliseeva, a Moscow sports committee official
Olga Lerman	Valeria "Lera" Vasilyeva, Konstantin Beskov's fiancee
Actors	Soviet soccer player
Pavel Trubiner	Mikhail Yakushin is the team's coach of FC Dynamo Moscow
Roman Kurtsyn	Alexei Khomich is a Soviet goalkeeper of FC Dynamo Moscow
Aleksei Chechukevich	Vsevolod Radikorsky is a Soviet football player, defender of FC Dynamo Moscow
Stanislav Raskachaev	Mikhail Semichastny is a Soviet football player, forward and captain of FC Dynamo Moscow
Kirill Kuznetsov	Ivan Stankevich is a Soviet football player, defender of FC Dynamo Moscow
Stanislav Kolodub	Vsevolod Blinkov is a Soviet football player, midfielder of FC Dynamo Moscow
Aleksandr Korkunov	Leonid Solovyov is a Soviet football player, midfielder of FC Dynamo Moscow
Ivan Stepanov	Boris Oreshkin is a Soviet football player, midfielder of FC Dynamo Moscow
Vyacheslav Morozov	Yevgeny Arkhangelsky is a Soviet football player, forward of FC Dynamo Moscow
Vsevolod Makarov	Vasili Trofimov is a Soviet football player, right wing forward of FC Dynamo Moscow
Aleksandr Alyoshkin	Vasili Kartsev is a Soviet football player, forward of FC Dynamo Moscow
Denis Denisov	Nikolay Dementyev is a Soviet football player, forward of FC Dynamo Moscow
Dmitry Belotzerkovsky	Konstantin Beskov is a Soviet football player, forward of FC Dynamo Moscow
Yuri Trubin	Sergey Solovyov is a Soviet football player, forward of FC Dynamo Moscow
Actors	English soccer player
Sergey Belyaev	Vic Woodley is an English goalkeeper of Chelsea F.C.
Gleb Gervassiev	Tommy Lawton is an English football player, a forward for Chelsea F.C.
Mark Kondratenko	Joe Buckuzzi is an English football player

== Production ==
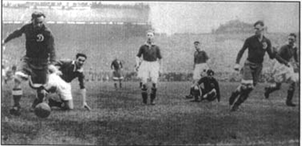
Rangers against Dynamo Moscow at Ibrox Stadium on November 28, 1945.

Especially for each actor playing a football player, a uniform was sewn, completely identical to the equipment of the athletes of 1945. A soccer ball and boots were recreated, made to order: with special carnations on which spikes were attached.

=== Filming ===
Principal photography began in September 2019 and took place in Moscow, the municipal city of Pavlovsk and Pushkin to the city of Saint Petersburg, the city of Kaluga, Russia, and London, United Kingdom.

== Release ==
Eleven Silent Men was theatrically released in the Russian Federation on February 17, 2022, by Central Partnership.

=== Marketing ===
The first trailer for the upcoming film was released on November 23, 2021.
