= 1945–46 Arsenal F.C. season =

English football club season

Arsenal
1945–46 season
- Chairman: Robin Vane-Tempest-Stewart, 8th Marquess of Londonderry
- Manager: George Allison
- Football League South: 11th
- FA Cup: Third round
Home colours	Away colours

The 1945–46 Arsenal F.C. season was Arsenal Football Club's first post-war football season. The team finished eleventh and were knocked out in the third round of the FA Cup. It was George Allison's last full season as Arsenal manager.

== Background ==
The 1945-46 season was the first peacetime football season since World War II began. In May 1945, the Football League announced that the FA Cup would return for the coming season, eliminating the wartime cup competitions. In July, the Football League came to an agreement that regional leagues would continue for one more season with some adjustments.

Arsenal entered the season with £150,000 in pre-war debts. They also continued to play their home games at White Hart Lane, as Highbury had been transformed to support Air Raid Precautions and was still being used for that purpose. Highbury had bombed during the war and required repairs before Arsenal could return.

Arsenal performed poorly in the league, flirting with relegation before finishing thirteenth. Although some players remained from Arsenal's successful 1930s runs, age, injury, and attrition led to a much weaker team than took the field prior to the war. Cliff Bastin was aging and Ted Drake had retired. Arsenal struggled to find success. Arsenal were knocked out of the FA Cup by West Ham.

One notable occurrence was when Arsenal hosted Dynamo Moscow late in 1945, a rare European match. London was covered in a "pea-souper fog." The fog was so bad that Dynamo wanted the match postponed but due to match sales, the FA refused. Arsenal manager George Allison brought in several guest players to strengthen Arsenal's side. Dynamo took an early lead in front of a 54,000 strong crowd. The fog was so thick that Russian referee Nikolay Latyshev had both of his assistants run the same side of the pitch. The first half finished 3-2 to Arsenal. At halftime, Arsenal's goalkeeper Wyn Griffiths was replaced by a spectator, QPR's Harry Brown, as he had taken several blows to the head and was unaware of even the score. The second half saw Sergei Solovyov equalize for Moscow and a George Drury red card for throwing a punch. Visibility continued to decrease. Dynamo went ahead and Arsenal had a goal disallowed. The game became increasingly rough. Dynamo won the match, and would go on to play one further match in their tour of England.

== Results ==
Arsenal's score comes first

=== Legend ===
Win	Draw	Loss

=== Football League South ===
Selected results from the league.

Date	Opponent	Venue	Result	Attendance	Scorers
25 August 1945	Coventry City	A	0–2		
27 August 1945	West Ham United	A	1–1	25,000	
1 September 1945	Coventry City	H	0–0		
3 September 1945	Wolverhampton Wanderers	A	1–1		
8 September 1945	Luton Town	H	0–2		
15 September 1945	Luton Town	A	2–1		
22 September 1945	Aston Villa	H	2–4		
29 September 1945	Aston Villa	A	1–5		
6 October 1945	Swansea Town	H	4–1		
13 October 1945	Swansea Town	A	2–3		
20 October 1945	Charlton Athletic	H	1–2		
27 October 1945	Charlton Athletic	A	2–6		
3 November 1945	Fulham	A	2–5		
10 November 1945	Fulham	H	2–0		
17 November 1945	Plymouth Argyle	H	3–0	14,479	
24 November 1945	Plymouth Argyle	A	4–0	26,419	
1 December 1945	Portsmouth	A	?–?		
8 December 1945	Portsmouth	H	?–?		
15 December 1945	Nottingham Forest	H	?–?		
22 December 1945	Nottingham Forest	A	?–?		
25 December 1945	Newport County	A	2–1	13,003	
26 December 1945	Newport County	H	7–0	16,536	
29 December 1949	Wolverhampoton Wanderers	H	?–?		
12 January 1946	West Bromwich Albion	H	?–?		
19 January 1946	West Bromwich Albion	A	?–?		
2 February 1946	Birmingham City	H	0–3		
9 February 1946	Tottenham Hotspur	H	1–1		
16 February 1946	Tottenham Hotspur	A	0–2		
23 February 1946	Brentford	A	3–6	22,250	
9 March 1946	Chelsea	H	1–2		
13 March 1946	Birmingham City	A	1–0		
16 March 1946	Chelsea	A	2–1		
23 March 1946	Millwall	A	?–?		
30 March 1946	Millwall	H	?–?		
6 April 1946	Southampton	H	?–?		
13 April 1946	Southampton	A	?–?		
19 April 1946	Derby County	A	?–?		
20 April 1946	Leicester City	H	?–?		
22 April 1946	Derby County	H	?–?		
27 April 1946	Leicester City	A	?–?		
29 April 1946	Brentford	H	1–1	5,250	
4 May 1946	West Ham United	H	2–1	30,000	

==== Final League table ====
Pos	Team	Pld	W	D	L	GF	GA	GR	Pts
9	Tottenham Hotspur	42	22	3	17	78	81	0.963	47
10	Chelsea	42	16	11	15	76	73	1.041	43
11	Arsenal	42	16	11	15	76	73	1.041	43
12	Millwall	42	17	8	17	79	105	0.752	42
13	Coventry City	42	15	10	17	70	69	1.014	40

Source: rsssf.com and War Hammers II

=== FA Cup ===
Round	Date	Opponent	Venue	Result	Attendance	Goalscorers
R3 L1	5 January 1946	West Ham United	A	0–6		
R3 L2	9 January 1946	West Ham United	H	1–0		
