= 1945 in Soviet football =

Football in the Soviet Union
- Season: 1945

Men's football
- 1st Group: Dynamo Moscow
- 2nd Group: Krylia Sovetov Kuybyshev
- Soviet Cup: CSKA Moscow

The 1945 Soviet football championship was the 13th season of competitive football in the Soviet Union and the 7th featuring teams hailing from sports societies and factories. It also was the first full season with league competitions after World War II. The tiers were renamed after World War II, with Group A being renamed to First Group and Group B renamed to Second Group. FC Dynamo Moscow won the championship, becoming the Soviet domestic champions for the fourth time.

== Honours ==
| Competition | Winner | Runner-up |
|---|---|---|
| 1st Group | Dynamo Moscow (4*) | CSKA Moscow |
| 2nd Group | Krylia Sovetov Kuybyshev | VVS Moscow |
| Soviet Cup | CSKA Moscow (1) | Dynamo Moscow |

Notes = Number in parentheses is the times that club has won that honour. * indicates new record for competition

== Soviet Union football championship ==
=== First Group ===
| Pos | Team | Pld | W | D | L | GF | GA | GD | Pts |
|---|---|---|---|---|---|---|---|---|---|
| 1 | Dynamo Moscow | 22 | 19 | 2 | 1 | 73 | 13 | +60 | 40 |
| 2 | CSKA Moscow | 22 | 18 | 3 | 1 | 69 | 23 | +46 | 39 |
| 3 | Torpedo Moscow | 22 | 12 | 3 | 7 | 41 | 21 | +20 | 27 |
| 4 | Dynamo Tbilisi | 22 | 9 | 8 | 5 | 37 | 22 | +15 | 26 |
| 5 | Dynamo Leningrad | 22 | 11 | 3 | 8 | 42 | 29 | +13 | 25 |
| 6 | Zenit Leningrad | 22 | 8 | 7 | 7 | 35 | 31 | +4 | 23 |
| 7 | Traktor Stalingrad | 22 | 9 | 3 | 10 | 23 | 38 | −15 | 21 |
| 8 | Krylia Sovetov Moscow | 22 | 6 | 6 | 10 | 23 | 48 | −25 | 18 |
| 9 | Dynamo Minsk | 22 | 5 | 7 | 10 | 20 | 39 | −19 | 17 |
| 10 | Spartak Moscow | 22 | 6 | 3 | 13 | 22 | 44 | −22 | 15 |
| 11 | Dynamo Kiev | 22 | 1 | 6 | 15 | 13 | 50 | −37 | 8 |
| 12 | Lokomotiv Moscow | 22 | 1 | 3 | 18 | 14 | 54 | −40 | 5 |

=== Second Group ===
| Pos | Team | Pld | W | D | L | GF | GA | GD | Pts |
|---|---|---|---|---|---|---|---|---|---|
| 1 | FC Krylia Sovetov Kuibyshev (P) | 17 | 12 | 3 | 2 | 37 | 20 | +17 | 27 |
| 2 | VVS Moscow | 17 | 9 | 6 | 2 | 32 | 12 | +20 | 24 |
| 3 | MVO Moscow | 17 | 10 | 4 | 3 | 37 | 16 | +21 | 24 |
| 4 | DKA Tbilisi | 17 | 8 | 7 | 2 | 22 | 15 | +7 | 23 |
| 5 | FC Stakhanovets Stalino | 17 | 9 | 5 | 3 | 36 | 25 | +11 | 23 |
| 6 | FC Torpedo Gorky | 17 | 8 | 4 | 5 | 43 | 30 | +13 | 20 |
| 7 | FC Pishchevik Odessa | 17 | 9 | 1 | 7 | 26 | 22 | +4 | 19 |
| 8 | FC Lokomotiv Kharkov | 17 | 5 | 6 | 6 | 31 | 27 | +4 | 16 |
| 9 | FC Krylya Sovetov Molotov | 17 | 7 | 2 | 8 | 33 | 30 | +3 | 16 |
| 10 | FC Tekstilshchik Ivanovo | 17 | 7 | 1 | 9 | 23 | 32 | −9 | 15 |
| 11 | DKA Novosibirsk | 17 | 7 | 0 | 10 | 21 | 27 | −6 | 14 |
| 12 | FC Dynamo Yerevan | 17 | 5 | 4 | 8 | 24 | 31 | −7 | 14 |
| 13 | FC Traktor Chelyabinsk | 17 | 5 | 4 | 8 | 18 | 30 | −12 | 14 |
| 14 | FC Dynamo Baku | 17 | 3 | 7 | 7 | 17 | 25 | −8 | 13 |
| 15 | KBF Leningrad | 17 | 5 | 3 | 9 | 21 | 31 | −10 | 13 |
| 16 | FC Uralmash Sverdlovsk | 17 | 5 | 2 | 10 | 26 | 39 | −13 | 12 |
| 17 | FC Spartak Leningrad | 17 | 4 | 2 | 11 | 23 | 40 | −17 | 10 |
| 18 | FC Trudovye Rezervy Moscow | 17 | 2 | 5 | 10 | 22 | 40 | −18 | 9 |

Source: footballfacts.ru
(P) Promoted

=== Top goalscorers ===
1st Group

- Vsevolod Bobrov (CSKA Moscow) – 24 goals

2nd Group

- Sergei Zaikin (Torpedo Gorkiy) – 11 goals

== Republican level ==
Football competitions of union republics

=== Football championships ===
- Azerbaijan SSR – Neftianik Baku
- Armenian SSR – Spartak Yerevan
- Belarusian SSR – Dynamo-2 Minsk (see Football Championship of the Belarusian SSR)
- Estonian SSR – Dynamo Tallinn
- Georgian SSR – Lokomotiv Tbilisi
- Kazakh SSR – none
- Karelo-Finish SSR – unknown
- Kirgiz SSR – Dynamo Frunze
- Latvian SSR – Dynamo Riga
- Lithuanian SSR – Spartak Kaunas
- Moldavian SSR – Dynamo Kishinev
- Russian SFSR – none
- Tajik SSR – none
- Turkmen SSR – none
- Uzbek SSR – none
- Ukrainian SSR – none (see Football Championship of the Ukrainian SSR)

=== Football cups ===
- Azerbaijan SSR – Neftianik Baku
- Armenian SSR – Dynamo Yerevan
- Belarusian SSR – ODO Minsk
- Estonian SSR – none
- Georgian SSR – Lokomotiv Tbilisi
- Kazakh SSR – none
- Karelo-Finish SSR – unknown
- Kirgiz SSR – none
- Latvian SSR – none
- Lithuanian SSR – none
- Moldavian SSR – Dynamo Kishinev
- Russian SFSR – none
- Tajik SSR – none
- Turkmen SSR – Dynamo Ashkhabad
- Uzbek SSR – none
- Ukrainian SSR – FC Lokomotyv Kharkiv (see 1945 Cup of the Ukrainian SSR)
