= Dementyev =

Origin
- Region of origin: Russia

Other names
- Variant forms: Dementiev, Dementieva

Dementyev, often spelt Dementiev (feminine: Dementyeva), is a Russian surname that is derived from the male given name Dementiy and literally means Dementiy's. Notable people with the surname include:

== Dementyev ==
- Andrey Dementyev (disambiguation), multiple people
- Carolina Dementiev (born 1989), Panamanian model
- Georgi Petrovich Dementiev (usual spelling) (1898–1969), Russian ornithologist
- Nikolay Dementyev (footballer, born 1915) (1915–1994), Soviet football player and coach
- Oleg Dementiev (1938–1991), Russian chess master
- Peter Demens, born Pyotr Alexeyevitch Dementyev (1850–1919), Russian immigrant, railway owner and one of the founders of the U.S. city of St. Petersburg, Florida
- Pyotr Dementyev (1913–1998), Soviet football player and coach, brother of Nikolay
- Yevgeny Dementyev (born 1983), Russian cross-country skier

== Dementyeva ==
- Elena Dementieva (born 1981), Russian tennis player
- Yelizaveta Dementyeva (1928–2022), Russian sprint canoer
- Anna Dementyeva (born 1994), Russian artistic gymnast
