= 1946 Soviet Cup =

1946 Cup of USSR in Football
Кубок СССР

Tournament details
- Country: Soviet Union
- Dates: October 6–20
- Teams: 16

Final positions
- Champions: Spartak Moscow (3rd title)
- Runners-up: Dinamo Tbilisi
- Semifinalists: Torpedo Moscow; Dinamo Kiev

The 1946 Soviet Cup was an association football cup competition of the Soviet Union. The whole competition was played in Moscow.

== Participating teams ==
Enter in First Round
Pervaya Grouppa 12/12 teams	Additional 4 teams
✓ CDKA Moscow; ✓ Dynamo Moscow; ✓ Dynamo Tbilisi; ✓ Torpedo Moscow; ✓ Dynamo Leningrad; ✓ Spartak Moscow; ✓ Krylia Sovetov Moscow; ✓ Traktor Stalingrad; ✓ Zenit Leningrad; ✓ Krylia Sovetov Kuibyshev; ✓ Dynamo Minsk; ✓ Dynamo Kiev	Vtoraya Grouppa winners ✓ VVS Moscow (Southern Zone); ✓ Pischevik Moscow (Eastern Zone) Tretia Grouppa winners ✓ Dinamo Riga (RSFSR championship); ✓ Spartak Uzhgorod (USSR championship)

Source: []

== Competition schedule ==
=== First round ===
[Oct 6]
CDKA Moskva                  4-1  Zenit Leningrad 
  [Ivan Shcherbakov 6, Valentin Nikolayev 54, Alexei Grinin 84 pen, Vsevolod Bobrov 90 – Ivan Komarov 49] 
TORPEDO Moskva               3-0  Krylya Sovetov Kuibyshev 
  [Vasiliy Zharkov 23, 48, Vasiliy Panfilov 87] 
[Oct 7] 
DINAMO Moskva                4-0  Pishchevik Moskva 
  [Konstantin Beskov 32, Vasiliy Trofimov 43, 68, Alexandr Malyavkin 85] 
Dinamo Tbilisi               0-0  Dinamo Minsk 
[Oct 8] 
SPARTAK Moskva               6-2  VVS Moskva 
  [Alexei Sokolov-2, Ivan Konov, Georgiy Glazkov, Boris Kulagin (V) og, Alexandr Afonkin (V) og – Nikolai Gulyayev (S) og, Viktor Ponomaryov] 
SPARTAK Uzhgorod             4-3  Dinamo Leningrad         [aet] 
  [Dezideriy Tovt 17, R.Aikhert 62, A.Zdor 67, I.Fabian 93 – Yevgeniy Arkhangelskiy 4, Vasiliy Lotkov 21, Anatoliy Viktorov ?] 
[Oct 9] 
DINAMO Kiev                  3-0  Dinamo Riga 
  [Anatoliy Gorokhov 22, Oleg Zhukov 37, Pavel Vinkovatov 52] 
KRYLYA SOVETOV Moskva        2-1  Traktor Stalingrad 
  [Nikita Simonyan, Ruperto Sagasti – Viktor Matveyev]

==== First round replays ====
8 October 1946

Dinamo Tbilisi	2–0	Dinamo Minsk
Berezhnoi (?); Gogoberidze 90'

=== Quarterfinals ===
11 October 1946

Dynamo Moscow	1–2	Dinamo Tbilisi
Kartsev 75'		Paichadze 14'; Berezhnoi 60'

11 October 1946

Torpedo Moscow	4–0 (a.e.t.)	CDKA Moscow
Zharkov 91'; Ponomaryov 109'; Ponomaryov 116'; Petrov 118'

13 October 1946

Krylia Sovetov	1–2 (a.e.t.)	Dynamo Kyiv
Dementyev 54'		Zhukov 75'; Rogozyanskiy 91'

13 October 1946

Spartak Moscow	5–0	Spartak Uzhhorod
Glazkov 6'; Dementyev 11'; Glazkov 69'; Sokolov 79'; Klimov 86'

=== Semifinals ===
15 October 1946

Torpedo Moscow	1 – 2	Dinamo Tbilisi
Petrov 80'		Panyukov 6'; Berezhnoi 60'

16 October 1946

Spartak Moscow	3 – 1	Dynamo Kyiv
Timakov 25'; Smyslov 75'; Konov 88'		Gorokhov 67'

=== Final ===
20 October 1946

Spartak Moscow	3–2 (a.e.t.)	Dinamo Tbilisi
Konov 9'; Glazkov 38'; Timakov 99'		Gogoberidze 15'; Antadze 22'

Moscow
