= Bacuzzi =

Bacuzzi is an Italian surname. Notable people with the surname include:

- Joe Bacuzzi (1916–1995), English footballer and coach
- Dave Bacuzzi (1940–2020), English footballer and manager, son of Joe
