= 1951–52 Newport County A.F.C. season =

Welsh association football club season

Newport County
1951–52 season
- Manager: Fred Stansfield
- Stadium: Somerton Park
- Third Division South: 6th
- FA Cup: 3rd round
- Welsh Cup: 6th round
- Top goalscorer: League: Parker (19); All: Moore (24)
- Highest home attendance: 16,802 vs Northampton Town (20 August 1951)
- Lowest home attendance: 4,897 vs Southend United (17 January 1952)
- Average home league attendance: 10,259
Home colours	Away colours

The 1951–52 season was Newport County's fifth consecutive season in the Third Division South since relegation from the Second Division at the end of the 1946–47 season. It was the club's 23rd season in the third tier and 24th season overall in the Football League.

== Season review ==
=== Results summary ===
Overall								Home						Away					
Pld	W	D	L	GF	GA	GAv	Pts	W	D	L	GF	GA	Pts	W	D	L	GF	GA	Pts
46	21	12	13	77	76	1.013	54	13	7	3	45	26	33	8	5	10	32	50	21

Source: rsssf.com

=== Results by round ===
Round	1	2	3	4	5	6	7	8	9	10	11	12	13	14	15	16	17	18	19	20	21	22	23	24	25	26	27	28	29	30	31	32	33	34	35	36	37	38	39	40	41	42	43	44	45	46
Ground	A	H	H	A	A	H	A	A	H	H	A	A	H	A	H	A	H	A	A	A	H	A	H	A	H	H	A	H	H	H	A	H	A	H	A	A	H	H	H	A	A	H	H	A	H	A
Result	L	W	W	W	L	D	W	W	W	W	L	L	L	D	D	W	W	L	D	L	W	W	L	W	W	D	L	W	W	D	D	D	L	D	L	W	W	L	W	D	W	D	W	D	W	L
Position	18	9	6	7	13	13	8	5	2	2	3	5	9	10	10	8	6	9	6	11	10	10	10	9	8	7	9	8	8	7	7	7	8	8	8	7	6	7	6	6	6	6	6	6	6	6

Updated to match(es) played on 3 May 1952. Source: statto.com
A = Away; H = Home; W = Win; D = Draw; L = Loss

== Fixtures and results ==
=== Third Division South ===
Date	Opponents	Venue	Result	Scorers	Attendance
18 Aug 1951	Bristol City	A	1–3	Parker	30,048
20 Aug 1951	Northampton Town	H	2–0	Birch, Moore	16,802
25 Aug 1951	Ipswich Town	H	2–1	Parker, Moore	13,062
1 Sep 1951	Torquay United	A	2–1	Birch, Shergold	6,411
6 Sep 1951	Northampton Town	A	0–5		10,203
8 Sep 1951	Gillingham	H	1–1	Birch	10,725
12 Sep 1951	Reading	A	2–1	James 2	16,050
15 Sep 1951	Brighton & Hove Albion	A	2–1	Birch, James	10,949
17 Sep 1951	Reading	H	3–1	Parker 2, James	11,879
22 Sep 1951	Millwall	H	2–1	Birch, Evans	12,797
29 Sep 1951	Bournemouth & Boscombe Athletic	A	1–5	James	12,494
6 Oct 1951	Aldershot	A	0–4		8,801
13 Oct 1951	Watford	H	2–5	Parker, Donaldson	9,636
20 Oct 1951	Bristol Rovers	A	1–1	Beattie	17,396
27 Oct 1951	Plymouth Argyle	H	3–3	Birch, Beattie, Moore	10,065
3 Nov 1951	Norwich City	A	2–1	Beattie, Shergold	25,828
10 Nov 1951	Exeter City	H	4–0	Parker 2, Shergold 2	10,920
17 Nov 1951	Colchester United	A	1–2	Birch	7,729
1 Dec 1951	Swindon Town	A	1–1	Shergold	12,007
22 Dec 1951	Ipswich Town	A	1–3	Beattie	9,609
25 Dec 1951	Shrewsbury Town	H	3–1	Moore 2, Parker	9,982
26 Dec 1951	Shrewsbury Town	A	4–1	Beattie 2, Birch, Parker	9,982^{*}
29 Dec 1951	Torquay United	H	1–2	Parker	11,650
5 Jan 1952	Gillingham	A	3–2	Parker, Moore, Nelson	10,410
17 Jan 1952	Southend United	H	3–0	Birch, Beattie, Moore	4,897
19 Jan 1952	Brighton & Hove Albion	H	1–1	Beattie	10,333
26 Jan 1952	Millwall	A	0–2		17,761
9 Feb 1952	Bournemouth & Boscombe Athletic	H	2–0	Parker, Shergold	11,148
16 Feb 1952	Aldershot	H	4–2	Parker 3, Shergold	9,792
23 Feb 1952	Port Vale	H	1–1	Moore	11,593
1 Mar 1952	Watford	A	1–1	Parker	9,270
8 Mar 1952	Bristol Rovers	H	2–2	Parker, Moore	13,113
15 Mar 1952	Plymouth Argyle	A	0–5		17,939
22 Mar 1952	Norwich City	H	2–2	Beattie, Parker	10,350
24 Mar 1952	Port Vale	A	2–4	Shergold, OG	5,908
29 Mar 1952	Exeter City	A	4–3	Birch, Parker, Shergold	4,076
3 Apr 1952	Leyton Orient	H	1–0	Moore	7,137
5 Apr 1952	Colchester United	H	0–1		6,821
11 Apr 1952	Walsall	H	4–2	Moore 3, Beattie	9,385
12 Apr 1952	Crystal Palace	A	1–1	Lunn	14,904
14 Apr 1952	Walsall	A	1–0	Shergold	7,700
19 Apr 1952	Swindon Town	H	0–0		9,217
24 Apr 1952	Crystal Palace	H	1–0	Moore	6,942
26 Apr 1952	Leyton Orient	A	1–1	OG	6,579
28 Apr 1952	Bristol City	H	1–0	Nelson	7,714
3 May 1952	Southend United	A	1–2	Moore	6,438

^{*} Ambrosen incorrectly records the Shrewsbury Town away match with same scoreline and attendance as the home match

=== FA Cup ===
Round	Date	Opponents	Venue	Result	Scorers	Attendance
1	24 Nov 1951	Barry Town	H	4–0	Moore 3, Beattie	11,844
2	15 Dec 1951	Leytonstone	A	2–2	Birch, Beattie	10,500
2r	20 Dec 1951	Leytonstone	H	3–0	Moore 2, Beattie	10,737
3	12 Jan 1952	Sheffield United	A	0–2		34,486

=== Welsh Cup ===
Round	Date	Opponents	Venue	Result	Scorers	Attendance
5	3 Jan 1952	Connah's Quay Nomads	H	8–2	Moore 3, James 2, Nelson 2, Molloy	1,878
6	28 Jan 1952	Rhyl	A	2–3	Donaldson, Lunn	

== League table ==
Pos	Team	Pld	W	D	L	GF	GA	GAv	Pts
4	Millwall	46	23	12	11	74	53	1.396	58
5	Brighton & Hove Albion	46	24	10	12	87	63	1.381	58
6	Newport County	46	21	12	13	77	76	1.013	54
7	Bristol Rovers	46	20	12	14	89	53	1.679	52
8	Northampton Town	46	22	5	19	93	74	1.257	49
