= Wyn Griffiths =

Welsh footballer

Personal information
- Full name: Wyn Rhys Griffiths
- Date of birth: 17 October 1919
- Place of birth: Blaengwynfi, Wales
- Date of death: 29 May 2006 (aged 86)
- Place of death: Newport, Wales
- Position: Goalkeeper

Youth career
- Derby County

Senior career*
Years	Team	Apps	(Gls)
1947–1952	Cardiff City	1	(0)
1952–1953	Newport County	3	(0)
- * Club domestic league appearances and goals

Wyn Rhys Griffiths (17 October 1919 – 29 May 2006) was a Welsh professional footballer who played as a goalkeeper. He began his career during wartime, playing for Derby County, Arsenal and Cardiff City, signing for the latter after the war. He made his professional debut in 1948 for the club but made no further appearances before moving on to Newport County.

== Career ==
Griffiths was born on a farm in the village of Blaengwynfi, near Maesteg. He began his career as an amateur with Derby County during wartime. He also appeared as a guest player for Cardiff City and Arsenal, including playing in Arsenal's match against Soviet side Dynamo Moscow who were touring the UK in 1945. He played the first 45 minutes of the match but was replaced at half time by Colchester United goalkeeper Harry Brown, who had attended the game as a spectator. Griffiths was forced off after sustaining an injury when he was kicked in the head by opposition forward Konstantin Beskov. When Griffiths was unable to continue, a call was issued around the ground for a replacement with Brown arriving in the home dressing room just before Charlton Athletic's Sam Bartram.

He signed for Cardiff City at the end of the war and made his professional debut in 1948, playing in a 1–1 draw with Newcastle United. However, he was unable to break into the first team ahead of Danny Canning and later Phil Joslin and eventually left the side in 1952. He moved to Newport County where he made three league appearances.

== Later life ==
Following the end of his professional football career Griffiths, who had qualified as a vet in July 1943, was employed at a colliery to treat the site's pit ponies. He went on to open his own veterinary practice in Newport before becoming a fellow at the Royal College of Veterinary Surgeons, becoming one of the first in Wales after publishing a paper on artificial insemination in sheep. He also worked for the Ministry of Agriculture inspecting cattle.

He went on to own race horses and became a well-known figure in horse racing, attending over 50 Epsom Derbys. This eventually led to him working for BBC Radio Wales as a racing reporter and tipster.

Griffiths developed Alzheimer's in later life. He died in May 2006 at the age of 86 in Royal Gwent Hospital in Newport after suffering a fall in his home.
