= Alexei Khomich =

Soviet footballer

Personal information
- Full name: Alexei Petrovich Khomich
- Date of birth: 14 March 1920
- Place of birth: Moscow, Soviet Union
- Date of death: 30 May 1980 (aged 60)
- Place of death: Moscow, USSR
- Height: 1.72 m (5 ft 8 in)
- Position: Goalkeeper

Youth career
- 1935: TPKO Moscow

Senior career*
Years	Team	Apps	(Gls)
1936–1939	Kombinat Moscow	33	(0)
1940	FC Pishchevik Moscow	10	(0)
1944–1952	Dinamo Moscow	175	(0)
1953–1955	Spartak Minsk	65	(0)
- * Club domestic league appearances and goals

Alexei (Note: Sometimes transcribed to English as Alexey, Aleksei or Aleksey.) Petrovich Khomich (Russian: Алексей Петрович Хомич; 14 March 1920 – 30 May 1980), nicknamed the Tiger, was a Soviet goalkeeper of the 1950s.

== Club career ==
During his career he played for FC Dynamo Moscow and FC Dinamo Minsk. He came to international prominence following Dynamo Moscow's tour of Great Britain in 1945, when his outstanding bravery led to him receiving the nickname "Tiger". He was noted for his excellent reflexes and energetic style.

With Dynamo Moscow he won Soviet Championships in 1945 and 1949, while he was also a runner up on four other occasions. He was also remembered as a mentor to the great Lev Yashin in the early part of Yashin's career with Dynamo Moscow.

For most of the Khomich's career, Soviet Union did not compete internationally. The first tournament at which it was represented was the 1952 Olympics. Khomich was never called up and does not have an international cap.

After retiring as a player, Khomich became sports photographer, working with Sovetsky Sport and Soviet Football.

== Honours ==
Dinamo Moscow

- Soviet Top League
  - Champions: 1945, 1949
  - Runners-up: 1946, 1947, 1948, 1950
- Soviet Cup
  - Runners-up: 1945, 1949

Dinamo Minsk

- Soviet Top League
  - Third place: 1954
