= Horace Cumner =

Welsh footballer

Personal information
- Full name: Reginald Horace Cumner
- Date of birth: 31 March 1918
- Place of birth: Cwmaman, Aberdare, Wales
- Date of death: 18 January 1999 (aged 80)
- Place of death: Poole, Dorset, England
- Position: Outside left

Youth career
- Aberaman Athletic
- 1935–1936: Arsenal

Senior career*
Years	Team	Apps	(Gls)
1936–1946	Arsenal	12	(2)
1936–1938	→ Margate (loan)		
1938	→ Hull City (loan)	12	(4)
1946–1948	Notts County	66	(11)
1948–1950	Watford	62	(7)
1950–1953	Scunthorpe United	102	(21)
1953–1954	Bradford City	0	(0)
1954–1955	Poole Town		
1955–1957	Bridport		
- Swanage Town
Total		254+	(45+)

International career
1939	Wales	3	(1)
	Wales (wartime)	10	(3)
- * Club domestic league appearances and goals

Reginald Horace Cumner (31 March 1918 – 18 January 1999) was a Wales international footballer. A forward, he played for Arsenal, Margate, Hull City, Notts County, Watford, Scunthorpe United, Bradford City, Poole Town, and Bridport. He won three international caps in the 1939 British Home Championship, scoring one goal.

== Club career ==
Cumner moved from Aberaman Athletic to Arsenal. He was loaned out to Margate and Hull City. During his loan spell at Margate, Cumner scored 43 goals in 80 appearances. During his loan spell at Hull City in 1938, Cumner scored four goals in 12 appearances, finding the net against Chester on his debut and subsequently against Port Vale, Bradford City and Crewe Alexandra. Cumner made his Arsenal debut against Wolverhampton Wanderers in September 1938, scoring the only goal in a 1–0 victory, and scored again against Chelsea the following month.

He played for Arsenal in the 1938 FA Charity Shield at Highbury, which ended in a 2–1 victory over Preston North End. During World War II he guested for Cardiff City, Fulham, Greenock Morton, Liverpool, Portsmouth, Swansea Town, Aberaman Athletic, Port Vale, Clapton Orient and Plymouth Argyle. He suffered severe burns during the war whilst on service for the Royal Marines.

In August 1946, he signed for Notts County in part exchange for Ian McPherson. He helped the Magpies to 12th and sixth place in the Third Division South in 1946–47 and 1947–48. He left Meadow Lane and switched to league rivals Watford. He helped Eddie Hapgood's "Hornets" to finish 17th in 1948–49 and sixth in 1949–50.

After departing Vicarage Road, he joined Leslie Jones's Scunthorpe United. He helped the "Iron" to mid-table finishes in the Third Division North in 1950–51, 1951–52, and 1952–53. He never played another game in the Football League after leaving the Old Showground, as he was signed to Ivor Powell's Bradford City, but never got onto the pitch at Valley Parade. He later moved into non-League football with Poole Town (Western League), Bridport (Dorset Combination), and Swanage Town.

== International career ==
Cumner earned three full caps for Wales, and scored in the 1938–39 British Home Championship 3–1 defeat of Ireland. Cumner also represented Wales in wartime internationals, making ten appearances and scoring three goals. In October 1942, only five weeks after suffering severe burns while serving with the Royal Marines, he scored both goals in Wales' 2–1 victory over England.

== Career statistics ==
Appearances and goals by club, season and competition
Club	Season	League			FA Cup		Total	
Club	Season	Division	Apps	Goals	Apps	Goals	Apps	Goals
Arsenal	1935–36	First Division	0	0	0	0	0	0
Arsenal	1936–37	First Division	0	0	0	0	0	0
Arsenal	1937–38	First Division	0	0	0	0	0	0
Arsenal	1938–39	First Division	12	2	0	0	12	2
Arsenal	1945–46		0	0	1	1	1	1
Arsenal	Total		12	2	1	1	13	3
Hull City (loan)	1937–38	Third Division North	12	4	0	0	12	4
Notts County	1946–47	Third Division South	35	5	3	1	38	6
Notts County	1947–48	Third Division South	31	6	5	1	36	7
Notts County	Total		66	11	8	2	74	13
Watford	1948–49	Third Division South	35	5	0	0	35	5
Watford	1949–50	Third Division South	23	2	4	0	27	2
Watford	1950–51	Third Division South	4	0	0	0	4	0
Watford	Total		62	7	4	0	66	7
Scunthorpe United	1950–51	Third Division North	35	10	0	0	35	10
Scunthorpe United	1951–52	Third Division North	44	11	4	0	48	11
Scunthorpe United	1952–53	Third Division North	23	0	0	0	23	0
Scunthorpe United	Total		102	21	4	0	106	21
Bradford City	1953–54	Third Division North	0	0	0	0	0	0
Career total			254	45	17	3	271	48

== Honours ==
Arsenal

- FA Charity Shield: 1938

Wales

- British Home Championship: 1938–39 (shared)
