= Skilly Williams =

English footballer

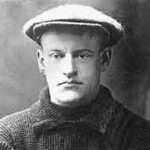

Personal information
- Full name: Reginald George Williams
- Date of birth: 4 January 1890
- Place of birth: Watford, Hertfordshire, England
- Date of death: 19 June 1959 (aged 69)
- Place of death: Watford, Hertfordshire, England
- Positions: Goalkeeper; striker

Senior career*
Years	Team	Apps	(Gls)
1909–1910	Leavesden Mental Hospital		
1910–1926	Watford	323	(0)
1926–1929	Brighton & Hove Albion		
- * Club domestic league appearances and goals

Reginald George "Skilly" Williams (4 January 1890 – 19 June 1959) was an English association footballer. Born in Watford, he played primarily as a striker during his amateur career, but later switched to become a goalkeeper. After playing for Leavesden Mental Hospital's football team, as well as for Hertfordshire, Williams joined Watford as an amateur in 1910, turning professional in 1914. During his first season as a professional, Watford won the 1914–1915 Southern Football League title. League football was then interrupted for four seasons due to the First World War. He served as a private in the Norfolk Regiment and the Labour Corps during the conflict. Following the resumption of competitive football in 1919, Williams again played a part as Watford finished runners up to Portsmouth on goal average. Watford entered the Football League the following season, and Williams stayed with the club for a further six seasons. He holds the record for the most Watford appearances by a goalkeeper; 83 in the Southern League, 240 in the Football League, 17 in the FA Cup and one in the Southern Charity Cup. He stayed at Watford until 1926, before moving to Brighton & Hove Albion on a free transfer.

== Personal life ==
Williams' son, Reg Jr. also went on to be a footballer, playing for Watford and Chelsea. His great-grandchildren, Danny Grieves, Darren Grieves and Grant Cornock played football, with all three playing for Watford at youth level. Darren Grieves' son, Jack is also a footballer, and currently plays for Watford.
