= The Sporting Spirit =

1945 essay by George Orwell

"The Sporting Spirit" is an essay by George Orwell published in the magazine Tribune on 14 December 1945, and later in Shooting an Elephant and Other Essays, a collection of Orwell's essays published in 1950. The essay was written on the heels of Soviet football club FC Dynamo Moscow's exhibition tour of the United Kingdom in November 1945. The essay became famous for Orwell's description of international sporting competitions as "war minus the shooting", a phrase that has since been used as a metaphor for sports when referred to in popular media and for actions evoking hyper-nationalism and national pride.

Orwell uses the examples of football, cricket, and boxing to argue that sport, while never intended to generate bonds of friendship, generates politicized and hyper-nationalistic emotions that can only stoke ill-will between nations.

== Background ==
Orwell wrote "The Sporting Spirit" in 1945 close on the heels of the publication of Animal Farm the same year. While Orwell was not known to have written extensively about sport earlier, the essay was considered to be in recognition of the political symbolism that sport represented as a tool that could invoke feelings of hyper-nationalism. The essay represented some of Orwell's own hostile attitude towards the Stalin regime in the Soviet Union, as drawn out by his response to the 1945 tour of Great Britain by Soviet football club FC Dynamo Moscow. The tour itself was considered groundbreaking and came after the combined Allied victory in World War II. While the tour was seen as an opportunity for the English to see the sport behind the Iron Curtain, on the Soviet side there was a meeting that the team members had with Stalin along with Lavrentiy Beria, chief of the Soviet secret police and patron of the football club where the need for victory over the capitalist opponents was emphasized.

== Summary ==
Orwell starts the essay with a critical view on the then just concluded Great Britain tour by the Moscow-based football club, Dynamo Moscow, and makes the assertion that the events during the tour eroded whatever little goodwill existed between the Soviets and the British. He specifically notes the incidents during the game between the visiting side and the Arsenal team where two of the players came into blows on the pitch, and a later game with Rangers that was a "free for all" before the visiting team ended the tour refusing to play an all-England team. He summarizes his view of the tour as an exercise that only created fresh animosity between the sides and viewpoints that varied based on the position on the political spectrum a person was on.

Orwell does not hide his contempt for using sport as a metaphor for creating goodwill between international sides be it in cricket, football, or even the Olympic Games and says that sport was never intended to create bonds of friendship between nations. He cites the example of the 1936 Summer Olympics held in Berlin, as an international event that generated "orgies of hatred".

"Serious sport has nothing to do with fair play. It is bound up with hatred, jealousy, boastfulness, disregard for all rules and sadistic pleasure in witnessing violence: in other words it is war minus the shooting."

— George Orwell, "The Sporting Spirit," 1945

He uses cricket as an example and goes on to say that a game as graceful and as well mannered as it is on the outside is prone to hyper-competitive events like the Bodyline series, or the behaviour of the visiting Australian cricket team in England in 1921. He calls sports like football and boxing as being significantly worse, specifically calling out boxing games between the whites and the "coloured" boxers in front of cheering mixed crowds as being amongst the most horrible sights. He further goes on to emphasize the role of competitive sport in younger nations where the notion of nationalism as well as competing in games at a national level is relatively new. He uses the examples of Burma, India, and Spain to talk about riots and violence that break out in football games that often require riot police to temper. He does not spare the audiences either and accuses them of being charged with jingoism as they cheer their own and attempt to rattle out the opposition. It is here that Orwell makes an assertion that sport does not have much to do with fair play and it encourages a perverse pleasure in watching violence and calls it as "war minus the shooting".

Orwell goes on to talk about the evolution of sport from the ancient Roman times, but the notion of national rivalry as a relatively newer addition. He further calls the financial motivations in countries like the United Kingdom and the United States, as another reason for degeneration of the sport to events that can generate and arouse savage passions in the quest to attract the maximum crowds. He calls this shift in sport as being bound to the rise of nationalism, the urge to associate with the larger power units and seeing all of the actions as contributing to a nation's "competitive prestige". He returns to the rivalry between nation states and says that one could not do worse than organising games between traditional rivals like the Germans and Czechs, Indians and British, Russian and Poles, or Jews and Arabs, and hoping for the game to better the relations between the groups, arguing that the politically charged hyper-nationalistic events would only increase the ill-will between the groups.

Orwell returns to the tour of Dynamo Moscow, and makes the case that Britain should very much send a team to the Soviet Union, but, it should be a "second rate" team which would stand no chance of winning. He ends the essay by saying that there are sufficient troubles in the world already and Britain should not add to them by "encouraging young men to kick each other on the shins amid the roars of infuriated spectators."

== Other media ==
=== Books ===
- War Minus the Shooting, a 1996 book by Mike Marqusee on his travels through the Indian subcontinent during the 1996 Cricket World Cup
- Olympism or "War Minus the Shooting"?, a 2006 book by Christopher Dyck on the role of sport in grassroots peacebuilding in Sierra Leone

=== Television ===
- "War Minus the Shooting", a 1969 episode of the British TV documentary series, Scene, telecast on BBC

== See also ==
- George Orwell bibliography
