= Jack Grieves =

English footballer (born 2004)

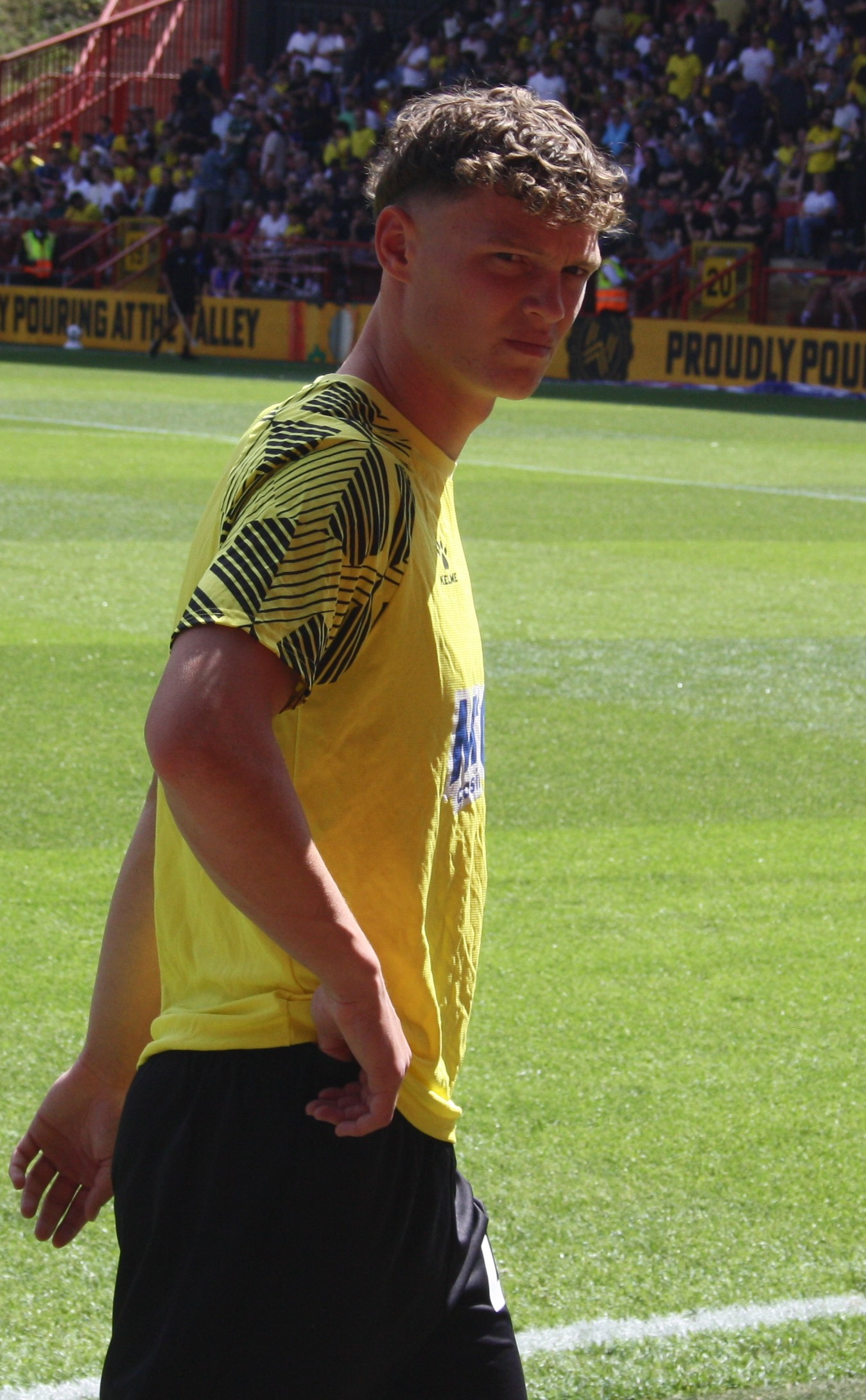
- Jack Grieves in 2025.

Personal information
- Full name: Jack Alexander Grieves
- Date of birth: 5 December 2004 (age 21)
- Place of birth: Watford, England
- Height: 1.88 m (6 ft 2 in)
- Position: Midfielder

Team information
- Current team: Watford
- Number: 43

Youth career
- 2013–2019: Watford
- 2019–2020: Everett Rovers FC
- 2020–2023: Watford

Senior career*
Years	Team	Apps	(Gls)
2023–	Watford	5	(0)
2024–2025	→ Ross County (loan)	22	(0)
- * Club domestic league appearances and goals as of 1 October 2025 (UTC)

Jack Alexander Grieves (born 5 December 2004) is an English professional footballer who plays as a forward for EFL Championship club Watford.

== Career ==
=== Youth career ===
Born in Watford, Grieves was first spotted at 8 years old when playing in a local tournament, and was signed in 2013 after a trial at the club.

Jack was released from the Academy at 14 in 2019, and went to play football at Everett Rovers and then Leverstock Green.

Grieves joined Watford for the second time in 2020 after taking another trial.

=== Senior career ===
He made his senior Watford debut on 7 January 2023, coming on as a second-half substitute for Leandro Bacuna in a 2–0 away defeat to Reading in the third round of the FA Cup.

In June 2023, Watford announced that Grieves had been offered a professional contract with the club. The following month, he signed a three-year contract with the club holding an option to extend the deal by a further year.

Grieves joined Ross County in July 2024 on a loan deal until the end of the season.

On 10 January 2026, he scored his first goal for Watford and his first senior-level professional goal in a 5–1 defeat to Bristol City in the third round of the FA Cup.

On 22 May 2026, Watford said it had triggered a one-year extension to his contract.

== Personal life ==
Grieves hails from a footballing family, with a number of relatives playing for Watford. His great-grandfather was wing-half Reg Williams, while his great-great-grandfather was goalkeeper Skilly Williams. His father, Darren, most notably played for AFC Wimbledon, while his uncle, Danny, played as a midfielder.

== Career statistics ==
=== Club ===
As of 10 January 2026

Appearances and goals by club, season and competition
Club	Season	League			National Cup (Note: Includes FA Cup, Scottish Cup)		League Cup (Note: Includes EFL Cup, Scottish League Cup)		Other		Total	
Club	Season	Division	Apps	Goals	Apps	Goals	Apps	Goals	Apps	Goals	Apps	Goals
Watford	2022–23	Championship	2	0	1	0	0	0	0	0	3	0
Watford	2023–24	Championship	2	0	0	0	0	0	0	0	2	0
Watford	2025–26	Championship	1	0	1	1	1	0	0	0	3	1
Watford	Total		5	0	2	1	1	0	0	0	8	1
Ross County (loan)	2024–25	Scottish Premiership	22	0	1	0	2	0	0	0	25	0
Career total			27	0	3	1	3	0	0	0	33	1
