= Danny Grieves =

English footballer

Personal information
- Full name: Daniel Leonard Grieves
- Date of birth: 21 September 1978 (age 48)
- Place of birth: Watford, England
- Height: 1.75 m (5 ft 9 in)
- Positions: Forward; midfielder

Youth career
- 1993–1997: Watford

Senior career*
Years	Team	Apps	(Gls)
1997–1999	Watford	0	(0)
1999	Maccabi Herzliya	9	(0)
2000	Cambridge United		
2000–2001	Queens Park Rangers	0	(0)
2002–2003	Thame United		
2003	Aylesbury United	5	(1)
2003–2004	Hemel Hempstead Town		
2004	Cheshunt		
2004–2006	Dover Athletic		
2006	Folkestone Invicta		
Total		14	(1)
- * Club domestic league appearances and goals

Daniel Leonard Grieves (born 21 September 1978) is an English former professional footballer.

== Club career ==
Grieves started his career as a trainee with Watford from 1996 to 1999. He made one appearance for Watford, in a 1–0 Football League Trophy loss to Fulham in 1997. In 1999 he moved to Israel to sign for Maccabi Herzliya. He made nine appearances in the Ligat Ha`Al, with no goals, before being released mid-season.

On his return to England, Grieves signed for Queens Park Rangers, but ultimately failed to make an appearances for the West-London club. Following his release, he played for Hemel Hempstead Town for a short period. He then signed for Aylesbury United ahead of the 2003–04 season, and went on to score on his debut. However, after four more appearances, he left the club to join Hemel Hempstead Town. He agreed a deal with Dover Athletic in 2004.

During his playing career, he also played for non-league sides Cambridge United, Thame United, Cheshunt and Folkestone Invicta.

== Personal life ==
Grieves hails from a footballing family, with his brother, Darren, playing the majority of his career in the English lower leagues. His grandfather was Watford and Chelsea half-back Reg Williams, while his great-grandfather was legendary Watford goalkeeper Skilly Williams - with Skilly Williams also being the grandfather of Grieves' cousin, Grant Cornock, who was also in Watford's academy. His nephew, Jack, is also a footballer, and currently also plays for Watford.

Having retired, Grieves ran an executive car service, as of 2014.

== Career statistics ==
=== Club ===
Appearances and goals by club, season and competition
Club	Season	League			National Cup (Note: Includes the FA Cup and Israel State Cup)		League Cup (Note: Includes the Football League Trophy and Toto Cup)		Other		Total	
Club	Season	Division	Apps	Goals	Apps	Goals	Apps	Goals	Apps	Goals	Apps	Goals
Watford	1997–98	Second Division	0	0	0	0	0	0	1 (Note: Appearances in the Football League Trophy)	0	1	0
Watford	1998–99	First Division	0	0	0	0	0	0	0	0	0	0
Watford	Total		0	0	0	0	0	0	1	0	1	0
Maccabi Herzliya	1999–00	Ligat Ha`Al	9	0	0	0	0	0	0	0	9	0
Queens Park Rangers	2000–01	First Division	0	0	0	0	0	0	0	0	0	0
Aylesbury United	2003–04	Isthmian League	5	1	0	0	–		0	0	5	1
Career total			14	1	0	0	0	0	1	0	15	1
