= Reg Halton =

English footballer and manager

Personal information
- Full name: Reginald Lloyd Halton
- Date of birth: 11 July 1916
- Place of birth: Leek, Staffordshire, England
- Date of death: 17 March 1988 (aged 71)
- Place of death: Leek, Staffordshire, England
- Height: 5 ft 11 1/2 in (1.82 m)
- Position: Left-half

Senior career*
Years	Team	Apps	(Gls)
- Cheddleton Mental Hospital
1934–1935	Stafford Rangers		
1935–1936	Buxton		
1936–1937	Manchester United	4	(1)
1937	Notts County	6	(0)
1937–1948	Bury	117	(20)
- → Rochdale (guest)
- → Portsmouth (guest)
- → Fulham (guest)
- → Arsenal (guest)
1948–1950	Chesterfield	61	(10)
1950–1953	Leicester City	64	(3)
1953–1954	Scarborough		
1954–?	Goole Town		
- Symingtons
- Brush Sports

Managerial career
- 1953–1954: Scarborough
- * Club domestic league appearances and goals

Reginald Lloyd Halton (11 July 1916 – 17 March 1988) was an English footballer. His regular position was left half. He was born in Leek, Staffordshire. He played for Cheddington Mental Hospital, Notts County, and Manchester United. He also played for Bury, Chesterfield and Leicester City. During World War II, he played as a guest for Aldershot and also played for Arsenal against Dynamo Moscow. He was later manager of Scarborough and Leek Town.

He also played cricket for Staffordshire in the Minor Counties Championship between 1938 and 1956, making 34 appearances. He was a left-handed batsman.
