= Jimmy Bain (footballer, born 1919) =

Scottish footballer

Personal information
- Full name: James Alistair Bain
- Date of birth: 14 December 1919
- Place of birth: Blairgowrie, Scotland
- Date of death: 30 December 2002 (aged 83)
- Place of death: Brampton, Ontario Canada
- Position: Winger

Senior career*
Years	Team	Apps	(Gls)
- Gillingham
1946–1947	Chelsea	9	(1)
1947–1954	Swindon Town	235	(40)
- Headington United
Total		244	(41)
- * Club domestic league appearances and goals

James Alistair Bain (14 December 1919 – 30 December 2002), was a Scottish footballer who played as a winger in the Football League.
