= 1945 Cup of the Ukrainian SSR =

The 1945 Ukrainian Cup was a football knockout competition conducting by the Football Federation of the Ukrainian SSR and was known as the Ukrainian Cup.

== Competition schedule ==
=== Unknown round games ===
Dynamo Chernivtsi	?:?	Kamianets-Podilskyi team
Dynamo Chernivtsi	?:?	Lokomotyv Ternopil

=== First elimination round ===
The main date for games was on 27 September 1945.

Spartak Kherson	3:3	Sudnobudivnyk Mykolaiv	(Spartak Kherson proceeded to the next round under unknown circumstances)
Vinnytsia team	6:0	Zhytomyr team
Dynamo Lviv	?:?	unknown	(date is not certain, but sometime in September)

=== Second elimination round ===
The main date for games was on 7 October 1945.

Sumy team	1:2	Dynamo Kyiv
Stal Dnipropetrovsk	4:3	Dynamo Voroshylovhrad
Spartak Kherson	2:1	Silmash Kirovohrad
Lokomotyv Yasynuvata	4:1	Stal Dniprodzerzhynsk
Vinnytsia team	0:3	Ternopil team
Lokomotyv Zaporizhia	3:0	Budivelnyk Kryvyi Rih
Traktor Kharkiv	5:0	Stal Kostiantynivka
VVS KVO Kiev	+/-	Spartak Lviv	(no show)
Dynamo Lviv	9:0	Spartak Drohobych
Avanhard Kramatorsk	3:2	Dynamo Kharkiv	3:3 (first game played on 7 October), (second game played on 8 October)
Stanislav team	4:0	Dynamo Lutsk

=== Third elimination round ===
The main date for games was on 14 October 1945.

Dynamo Kyiv	2:0	VVS KVO Kiev
Dynamo Lviv	6:0	Stanislav team
Stal Dnipropetrovsk	4:0	Avanhard Kramatorsk
Lokomotyv Zaporizhia	4:0	Stakhanovets Stalino
Spartak Kherson	0:2	Traktor Kharkiv	0:0 (first game played on 14 October), (second game played on 15 October)

=== Fourth elimination round ===
The main date for games was on 21 October 1945.

Dynamo Kyiv	2:0	Traktor Kharkiv
Stal Mariupol	+/-	Stal Dnipropetrovsk	(no show or forfeit)
Lokomotyv Zaporizhia	+/-	Dynamo Lviv	(no show or forfeit)
Lokomotyv Kharkiv	7:0	Dynamo Kyiv	(played on 25 October)

=== Quarterfinals ===
The main date for games was on 28 October 1945.

Kharchovyk Odesa	1:0	Dynamo Chernivtsi	(played on 27 October)
Dynamo Kyiv	4:1	Lokomotyv Zaporizhia
Lokomotyv Kharkiv	15:0	Stal Mariupol
Uzhhorod team	?:?	Stakhanovets Stalino

=== Semifinals ===
All games were played in Kyiv.

Dynamo Kyiv	4:1	Kharchovyk Odesa	2:2 (first game played on 4 November), (second game played on 5 November)
Lokomotyv Kharkiv	2:0	Stakhanovets Stalino

=== Final ===
8 November 1946

Dynamo Kyiv	0–1	Lokomotyv Kharkiv
		Horokhov

Dynamo Stadium, Kyiv
Attendance: ?

== Top goalscorers ==
Scorer	Goals	Team
(Ukrainian Soviet Socialist Republic)	?	

Ukrainian Cup 1945 Winners

FC Mashynobudivnyk Kyiv
Second title

== See also ==
- Soviet Cup
- Ukrainian Cup
