= Vadim Sinyavsky =

Soviet sports journalist

- Born: Vadim Svyatoslavovich Sinyavsky; 10 August 1906; Smolensk, Russian Empire
- Died: 3 July 1972 (aged 65); Moscow, Soviet Union
- Occupations: Sports journalist and commentator

Vadim Svyatoslavovich Sinyavsky (Russian: Вади́м Святосла́вович Синя́вский; 10 August 1906, Smolensk – 3 July 1972, Moscow) was a Soviet sports journalist and sports commentator, the founder of the Soviet school of sports radio reporting.
