= Joe Bacuzzi =

English footballer and manager

Personal information
- Full name: Giuseppe Luigi David Bacuzzi
- Date of birth: 25 September 1916
- Place of birth: Clerkenwell, London, England
- Date of death: 1 February 1995 (aged 78)
- Position: Full-back

Youth career
- Tufnell Park

Senior career*
Years	Team	Apps	(Gls)
1935–1956	Fulham	283	(2)
1940–1941	→ Reading (guest)		
1941–1942	→ Manchester City (guest)		
1941–1942	→ Bury (guest)		
1942–1943	→ Derby County (guest)		
1942–1945	→ Notts County (guest)		
1945	→ Chelsea (guest)		
1945	→ Arsenal (guest)		

International career
1939–1946	England (wartime)	13	(0)

Managerial career
- 1956–1965: Fulham Reserves (coach)
- * Club domestic league appearances and goals

Giuseppe Luigi David "Joe" Bacuzzi (25 September 1916 – 1 February 1995), was an English footballer and coach who spent most of his career at Fulham. In November 1945, however, he guested for both Chelsea and Arsenal in their prestige friendlies against a touring FC Dynamo Moscow. As an international he also played for England during the Second World War.

== Personal life ==
Bacuzzi was born in Clerkenwell, London, England into an Anglo-Italian family that had settled in London. His father, Camillo, came from Sorisole (Bergamo), and his mother, Natalina Clerici, from Precotto, a neighbourhood of Milan. His son, Dave Bacuzzi, was also a notable footballer, playing as a defender for both Arsenal and Manchester City. Bacuzzi Sr. lived in the Clerkenwell area until he died, aged 78 in 1995.

== Playing career ==
=== Club career ===
Bacuzzi began his career with Tufnell Park before having trials with Arsenal. However, he failed to impress the Gunners and was subsequently signed as an amateur by Fulham in 1935. He turned professional in 1936 and in January 1937 he made his first team debut for Fulham, playing as a right-back, in a 4–1 defeat away to Chesterfield. However, he only made one other senior appearance that season, playing as a left-back against Barnsley. Bacuzzi scored just two goals during his career and he netted his first during the 1938–39 season when Fulham defeated Luton Town 4–1. He was an ever-present during the same season and went on to make 70 appearances for the club before the start of the Second World War.

During the war Bacuzzi made 104 appearances for Fulham in regional leagues. He was also an active guest player and made a further 14 league appearances for several other clubs, most notably Bury and Notts County. Between 1943 and 1944 he also served with the military in North Africa and Italy. His most notable guest appearances came in November 1945 when Bacuzzi played for both Chelsea and Arsenal in their prestige friendlies against a touring FC Dynamo Moscow. On 13 November at Stamford Bridge he helped Chelsea hold Dynamo to a 3–3 draw. Then on 21 November at White Hart Lane, together with Stanley Matthews and Stan Mortensen, he was a member of an Arsenal XI that lost 4–3 to Dynamo.

After the war Bacuzzi remained Fulham's first choice right-back and he continued playing until he was almost 40, taking his total of league and cup appearances for the club to 299. He only retired when a terrible knee injury ended his playing career at the end of the 1955–56 season. In August 1949 he scored his second goal for the club with a fortunate shot against Wolves. It was also the club's first ever goal in the First Division. While still playing, Bacuzzi also seems to have acted as an impromptu scout for the club and was responsible for discovering Bedford Jezzard.

=== England international ===
Between 1939 and 1946 Bacuzzi played 13 times for England. He made his international debut on 11 November 1939 against Wales in a 1–1 draw at Ninian Park. This game saw England use a substitute for the first time after Bacuzzi was injured. On 2 February 1941 at St James' Park during his third international he scored an own goal when a misplaced back header gave Scotland a 3–2 win. After helping England defeat Wales 5–3 at Wembley Stadium on 27 February 1943, he had to wait for over three years before he made his next and final appearance. He made his last appearance for England on 19 May 1946 in a 2–1 defeat against France, in a Victory International at the Stade Olympique. Bacuzzi's teammates during his international career included, among others, Stanley Matthews, Joe Mercer and Tommy Lawton.

== Coaching career ==
After retiring as a player in 1956, he was appointed reserve team trainer at Fulham and stayed in that post until 1965 when he was sacked by Vic Buckingham.

== Honours ==
Fulham

- Second Division
  - Winners 1948–49: 1

== Sources ==
- Soccer at War – 1939 – 45 (2005): Jack Rollin
- Maine Road Favourites – Where Are They Now ? (2006): Ian Penney with Fred Eyre
