= Reg Williams (footballer) =

English footballer

Personal information
- Full name: Reginald Frederick Williams
- Date of birth: 28 January 1922
- Place of birth: Watford, Hertfordshire, England
- Date of death: 6 October 2011 (aged 89)
- Place of death: England
- Position: Wing half

Senior career*
Years	Team	Apps	(Gls)
	Watford	133	(9)
1945–1951	Chelsea	58	(14)
Total		191	(23)
- * Club domestic league appearances and goals

Reginald Frederick Williams (28 January 1922 – 6 October 2011) was an English professional footballer who played as a wing half.

== Club career ==
Williams was named as Chelsea's oldest surviving player in February 2011.

== Personal life ==
Williams' father, Reg "Skilly" Sr. was also a footballer, amassing almost 400 appearances for Watford. Two of his grandchildren, Danny and Darren Grieves, as well as Darren's son, Jack also went on to play football, with Jack who plays for Watford.

== Death ==
He died in October 2011.
