= Andrey Dementyev =

Andrey Dementyev or Andrei Dementiev may refer to:

- Andrey Dementyev (poet) (1928–2018), Russian poet
- Andrey Dementyev (footballer) (born 1970), Russian footballer
