= Beriah Moore =

Welsh footballer

Personal information
- Full name: John Frederic Beriah Moore
- Date of birth: 25 December 1919
- Place of birth: Cardiff, Wales
- Date of death: 2005 (aged 85–86)
- Place of death: Bangor, Wales
- Position: Winger

Youth career
- Cardiff Corinthians

Senior career*
Years	Team	Apps	(Gls)
1947–1949	Cardiff City	6	(4)
1949–1950	Bangor City		
1950–1953	Newport County	121	(45)
- Bangor City
Total		127	(49)
- * Club domestic league appearances and goals

John Frederic Beriah Moore (25 December 1919 – 2005) was a Welsh professional footballer. A winger, he played for Cardiff City F.C. and scored the only goal for Cardiff in a 10–1 friendly defeat to Dynamo Moscow in 1945. In 1950 he joined Newport County from Bangor City F.C. and went on to make 121 appearances for the club, scoring 45 goals. In 1953 he rejoined Bangor City. In later life he became a director of Bangor and died in his eighties (precise date unknown).
