= Vic Woodley =

English footballer and manager

Personal information
- Full name: Victor Robert Woodley
- Date of birth: 26 February 1910
- Place of birth: Slough, England
- Date of death: 23 October 1978 (aged 68)
- Height: 6 ft 0 in (1.83 m)
- Position: Goalkeeper

Senior career*
Years	Team	Apps	(Gls)
19??–1931	Windsor & Eton		
1931–1945	Chelsea	252	(0)
1946–1947	Derby County	30	(0)

International career
1937–1939	England	19	(0)
- * Club domestic league appearances and goals

Victor Robert Woodley (26 February 1910 – 23 October 1978) was an English football goalkeeper who played for Chelsea was an FA Cup Winner with Derby County and the England national team between the wars.

Woodley was spotted by a Chelsea scout whilst playing for Windsor & Eton and signed for the club in 1931, making his debut the same year. Woodley was a member of the glamorous Chelsea side of the 1930s, playing alongside the likes of Hughie Gallacher, Alex Jackson and Alec Cheyne. Known for his reliability and his impressive sense of anticipation, Woodley's performances were often key to preserving Chelsea's First Division status with his high-profile teammates invariably failing to live up to expectations. So reliable was he that he kept John Jackson, Scotland's first choice goalkeeper, out of the Chelsea side.

Woodley won nineteen caps for England – all consecutive, a record at the time – and in an era when there was stiff competition for the England goalkeeping jersey from Harry Hibbs, George Tweedy and Frank Swift. Woodley was a member of the England side which toured Nazi Germany in 1938, performing the Hitler salute before the match at the Olympiastadion. His international career was ended prematurely by the outbreak of the Second World War.

Woodley briefly resumed his playing career with Chelsea after the War, playing in their famous friendly match against Dynamo Moscow, but left on a free transfer shortly afterwards and joined Bath City. An injury crisis among Derby County's goalkeepers saw Woodley return to the First Division early in 1946, making a further 30 league appearances. Woodley's career also ended on a high note, as he kept goal during Derby's 4–1 FA Cup final win over Charlton Athletic.

Following his retirement, he ran a pub in Bradford-on-Avon. He died in October 1978.

== Honours ==
Derby County

- FA Cup: 1945–46
