= Pyotr Dementyev (footballer) =

Soviet footballer

Pyotr Timofeyevich (Peka) Dementyev (Russian: Пётр Тимофеевич (Пека) Дементьев), 12 December 1913 — 1998) was a Soviet footballer who mainly played for Dynamo Leningrad and Zenit, as well as internationally for the Soviet Union, in the 1930s and 1940s. Whereas Dementyev's teams never won any significant trophies, he is considered to be one of the most talented Soviet footballers of his generation.

== Career ==
Dementyev was born in 1913 in Saint Petersburg. His father was a factory worker, and his younger brother, Nikolay Dementyev, also became a footballer. At the age of 13, Dementyev first played for the Merkur football club in the Championship of Leningrad, and later obtained a special permission to become a player of the Football Club of the Khalturin Textile Factory. He played as striker and became extremely popular with the supporters. In 1933, he was invited to play for the international selection, and eventually had 6 caps (until 1935), all of them in unofficial matches. From 1932, he also played for Dynamo Leningrad, in particular, since 1936, after the Soviet Union Football Championship was started, Dementyev played in the top division. In 1932 and 1935 with Dynamo he reached the second place in the division.

In 1937, playing against Dynamo Moscow, Dementyev was injured, and could not play for a year. He subsequently returned to Dynamo Leningrad, but had to leave in 1940, due to a conflict with the head coach Mikhail Butusov. The Soviet Union did not have a free transfer market, and Dementyev was told that he has to stay in Leningrad, which made Zenit the only option. He spent the season of 1941 with Zenit, having played 8 games, and then the World War II started, and the Championship was canceled. Dementyev was sent to Kazan and worked on a factory, but his parents stayed in Leningrad and died during the Siege of Leningrad.

In 1944, Dementyev was allowed to move to Moscow, and he played until 1946 for Krylia Sovetov. Subsequently he moved to Kiev, where he played two seasons for Dynamo Kyiv, and in 1949 returned to Dynamo Leningrad. Whereas all these clubs in the 1940s played in the top division, none of them was a medal contender, and Dementyev never recovered his pre-war level and standing. In total, Dementyev played 207 matches in the Soviet Union Championship, all of them in the top league. In 1952, he retired from association football.

Dementyev was also a top bandy player. In the 1930s, there was only one season of bandy championship of the Soviet Union, in 1936, and he reached the third place with Dynamo Leningrad.

After retirement from football, Dementyev worked as a coach, but never at the top level. He is described as a direct but not very social person, and he often run into disagreements with his colleagues. In 1978, he moved to Moscow, and subsequently published an autobiography. He was married and had three children. He died in 1998.
