= Vsevolod Blinkov =

Russian footballer/manager and bandy player

Personal information
- Full name: Vsevolod Konstantinovich Blinkov
- Date of birth: 10 December 1918
- Place of birth: Novonikolayevsk, Russian SFSR
- Date of death: 30 September 1987 (aged 68)
- Place of death: Moscow, Russian SFSR, USSR
- Position: Midfielder

Youth career
- 1934–1935: Physical Culture Technicum Novosibirsk

Senior career*
Years	Team	Apps	(Gls)
1936–1939	Dynamo Novosibirsk		
1940–1953	FC Dynamo Moscow	222	(13)

Managerial career
- 1954–1960: FC Dynamo Moscow (assistant)
- 1961: FC Dynamo Moscow
- 1962–1964: FC Dynamo Moscow (assistant)
- 1965, 1969: FC Torpedo Kutaisi
- 1970–1971: Krylia Sovetov Kuibyshev
- 1973–1974: Zarya Voroshilovgrad
- 1977–1978: FC Dynamo Moscow (director)
- * Club domestic league appearances and goals

Vsevolod Konstantinovich Blinkov (Russian: Всеволод Константинович Блинков; born 10 December 1918 in Novonikolayevsk; died 30 September 1987 in Moscow) was a Russian football player and manager, and a bandy player who played in the Soviet Union.

== Honours ==
- Soviet Top League winner: 1940, 1945, 1949
- Soviet Cup runner-up: 1945, 1949
- Top 33 players year-end list: 1948
- Bandy Soviet champion: 1951, 1952, Bandy Soviet championship runner-up: 1954
- Soviet Bandy cup winner: 1941, 1947, 1949, 1950, 1951, 1952, 1953, 1954
