= 1945 Soviet Top League =

8th season of top-tier football league in Soviet Union

Soviet Top League
- Season: 1945
- Champions: Dynamo Moscow
- Matches played: 242
- Goals scored: 412 (1.7 per match)
- Top goalscorer: Vsevolod Bobrov (24 goals)
- Biggest home win: Dynamo Moscow 10–0 Sovetov Moscow (June 26)
- Biggest away win: Lokomotiv Moscow 1–7 CDKA(May 19); Traktor Stalingrad 0–6 CDKA(July 7)
- Highest scoring: Dynamo Moscow 10–0 Sovetov Moscow (June 26)

12 teams took part in the league with FC Dynamo Moscow winning the championship.

== League standings ==
Pos	Team	Pld	W	D	L	GF	GA	GD	Pts
1	Dynamo Moscow	22	19	2	1	73	13	+60	40
2	CDKA Moscow	22	18	3	1	69	23	+46	39
3	Torpedo Moscow	22	12	3	7	41	21	+20	27
4	Dynamo Tbilisi	22	9	8	5	37	22	+15	26
5	Dynamo Leningrad	22	11	3	8	42	29	+13	25
6	Zenit Leningrad	22	8	7	7	35	31	+4	23
7	Traktor Stalingrad	22	9	3	10	23	38	−15	21
8	Krylia Sovetov Moscow	22	6	6	10	23	48	−25	18
9	Dynamo Minsk	22	5	7	10	20	39	−19	17
10	Spartak Moscow	22	6	3	13	22	44	−22	15
11	Dynamo Kiev	22	1	6	15	13	50	−37	8
12	Lokomotiv Moscow	22	1	3	18	14	54	−40	5

== Results ==
Home \ Away	CDK	DYK	DLE	DMN	DYN	DTB	KSM	LOK	SPA	TOR	TRA	ZEN
CDKA Moscow		3–1	2–2	2–0	1–4	3–1	0–0	2–1	5–1	2–1	3–0	1–0
Dynamo Kiev	0–7		0–1	0–1	1–5	2–7	2–2	1–1	1–2	2–1	1–2	1–1
Dynamo Leningrad	2–3	1–1		2–1	2–3	1–1	4–1	3–0	0–1	1–3	2–0	3–2
Dynamo Minsk	2–5	0–0	0–4		0–3	0–0	3–0	2–1	0–3	0–0	4–1	1–1
Dynamo Moscow	0–2	4–0	2–0	3–0		3–0	10–0	4–0	4–0	2–0	4–2	5–0
Dynamo Tbilisi	2–4	0–0	2–0	5–0	1–2		1–2	3–0	1–0	1–1	0–0	2–0
Krylia Sovetov Moscow	2–6	1–0	3–2	1–1	1–2	0–0		1–0	2–0	0–1	0–2	1–1
Lokomotiv Moscow	1–7	1–0	0–2	1–2	1–3	1–1	2–4		0–2	0–1	0–2	3–4
Spartak Moscow	2–3	1–0	0–1	2–2	1–1	1–2	2–1	1–1		0–4	1–3	1–3
Torpedo Moscow	0–1	4–0	1–4	4–1	1–1	0–1	4–0	3–0	5–0		2–0	1–4
Traktor Stalingrad	0–6	3–0	1–5	1–0	0–4	0–4	0–0	2–0	2–0	1–2		1–0
Zenit Leningrad	1–1	2–0	2–0	0–0	0–4	2–2	5–1	4–0	3–1	0–2	0–0	

Legend: Blue = home team win; Yellow = draw; Red = away team win.

== Top scorers ==
24 goals

- Vsevolod Bobrov (CDKA Moscow)

21 goals

- Vasili Kartsev (Dynamo Moscow)

18 goals

- Sergei Solovyov (Dynamo Moscow)

14 goals

- Grigory Fedotov (CDKA Moscow)
- Vasili Panfilov (Torpedo Moscow)

11 goals

- Aleksandr Fyodorov (Dynamo Leningrad)
- Valentin Nikolayev (CDKA Moscow)

10 goals

- Vladimir Dyomin (CDKA Moscow)
- Aleksandr Malyavkin (Dynamo Moscow)
- Aleksandr Sevidov (Krylia Sovetov Moscow)

== Soviet Cup ==
The Soviet cup was won by CSKA Moscow who beat FC Dynamo Moscow in the final 2-1.
