= Ivan Stankevich =

Soviet footballer (1914–1978)

Personal information
- Full name: Ivan Ivanovitch Stankevitch
- Date of birth: 11 April 1914
- Place of birth: Moscow, Russian Empire
- Date of death: 28 November 1978 (aged 64)
- Place of death: Moscow, Russian SFSR, Soviet Union
- Height: 1.74 m (5 ft 9 in)
- Position: Defender

Senior career*
Years	Team	Apps	(Gls)
1937–1939	FC Lokomotiv Moscow	38	(0)
1940–1948	FC Dynamo Moscow	66	(0)
Total		104	(0)
- * Club domestic league appearances and goals

Ivan Ivanovitch Stankevich (Russian: Ива́н Ива́нович Станке́вич, 11 April 1914, Moscow, Russian Empire — 28 November 1978, Moscow, USSR) was a Soviet football player. He played as defense for Moscow clubs Lokomotiv and Dynamo.

== Early life ==
Ivan Stankevich was born on April 11, 1914, in Moscow as a son of Moscow State University professor Ivan Stankevitch.

After graduating from the Moscow Institute of Transport Engineers, he taught theoretical mechanics in the Department of Theoretical Mechanics and Hydraulics at the Moscow Machine Tool Institute from 1953 to 1976. He was a candidate of technical sciences and also Deputy Dean of the evening faculty of the institute.

== Football ==
As a young man, he played for Moscow teams "Factory" named after F. E. Dzerzhinsky («Завод имени Ф. Э. Дзержинского») and "Sniper" («Снайпер»). From 1937 to 1939, he played for Lokomotiv. on August 11, he debuted in the USSR league in a match against Dynamo Leningrad, as a substitute for Ilya Gvozdkov. While playing in Lokomotiv, he trained at the Institute of railway engineers and received the specialty of track engineer.

In 1940, he transferred to Dynamo. With the White-Blues, he became a two-time national champion and a three-time silver medalist. He played in a USSR Cup Final, where his team lost against CDKA. In 1948, he was awarded the title of "Master of Sport." He retired from football due to multiple injuries.

In 1945 he was a member of the Dynamo tour in the UK.

From 1949 to 1951 he was an assistant coach at Dynamo.
