= George Drury (footballer) =

English footballer

Personal information
- Date of birth: 22 January 1914
- Place of birth: Hucknall, England
- Date of death: June 1972 (aged 58)
- Place of death: Hucknall, England
- Position: Inside forward

Youth career
- Heanor Town
- 1934–1936: Sheffield Wednesday

Senior career*
Years	Team	Apps	(Gls)
1936–1938	Sheffield Wednesday	44	(9)
1938–1946	Arsenal	38	(3)
1946–1948	West Bromwich Albion	29	(8)
1948–1950	Watford	35	(3)
- Linby Colliery
- Darlaston
- Normanton
Total		146	(23)
- * Club domestic league appearances and goals

George Drury (22 January 1914 – June 1972) was an English professional footballer who played as an inside forward.

== Career ==
Born in Hucknall, Drury began his career in non-league football with Heanor Town. He signed for Sheffield Wednesday in 1934, making his debut in November 1936.

Drury joined Arsenal in March 1938, making 11 league appearances in the Football League as they won the old First Division that season. He also played for West Bromwich Albion and Watford, before returning to non-league football with Linby Colliery, Darlaston and Normanton.
