= Leonid Solovyov (footballer) =

Soviet Russian footballer

Personal information
- Full name: Leonid Konstantinovich Solovyov
- Date of birth: 9 March 1917
- Place of birth: Serpukhov, Russia
- Date of death: 22 November 2004 (aged 87)
- Height: 1.77 m (5 ft 9 1/2 in)
- Position: Midfielder

Youth career
- Fabrika Nogina Serpukhov

Senior career*
Years	Team	Apps	(Gls)
1933–1938	Krasnoye Znamya Serpukhov		
1938–1941	Dinamo Minsk	34	(3)
1942	V/Ch t. Ivanova Moscow		
1943	Dynamo-2 Moscow		
1944–1953	Dynamo Moscow	171	(11)
- * Club domestic league appearances and goals

Leonid Konstantinovich Solovyov (Russian: Леонид Константинович Соловьёв; born 9 March 1917 in Serpukhov; died 22 November 2004) was a Soviet Russian football player.

== Honours ==
- Soviet Top League champion: 1945, 1949.
- Soviet Cup finalist: 1945, 1949.
