= Harry Brown (footballer, born 1924) =

English footballer (1924–1982)

Personal information
- Full name: Harold Thomas Brown
- Date of birth: 9 April 1924
- Place of birth: Kingsbury, England
- Date of death: Dec qtr 1981, aged 57
- Place of death: Trowbridge, Wiltshire, England
- Position: Goalkeeper

Youth career
- Queens Park Rangers

Senior career*
Years	Team	Apps	(Gls)
1945–1946	Queens Park Rangers	3	(0)
1945–1946	→ Colchester United (guest)	12	(0)
1946–1949	Notts County	93	(0)
1949–1951	Derby County	37	(0)
1951–1956	Queens Park Rangers	189	(0)
1956–1958	Plymouth Argyle	66	(0)
1956–1958	Exeter City	0	(0)
Total		397	(0)
- * Club domestic league appearances and goals

Harold Thomas Brown (9 April 1924 – June 1982) was an English footballer who played as a goalkeeper for Queens Park Rangers, Notts County, Derby County and Plymouth Argyle.

== Club career ==
Brown signed for Queens Park Rangers in 1940 and played during the war. He played for Colchester United while stationed at Colchester Garrison, making 12 Southern League appearances between October 1945 and April 1946.

Brown also guested for Arsenal in a friendly against Dynamo Moscow in November 1945, alongside Stanley Matthews and Stan Mortensen. He entered the game after watching as a fan, as Arsenal's goalkeeper was concussed in the first half.

Brown later joined Notts County (1946–1949) and Derby County (1949–1951) before re-joining QPR in 1951. He went on to play 189 league games for Rangers.

Brown transferred to Plymouth Argyle in August 1956 and later had a spell with Exeter City.
