= Konstantin Beskov =

Russian football player and coach

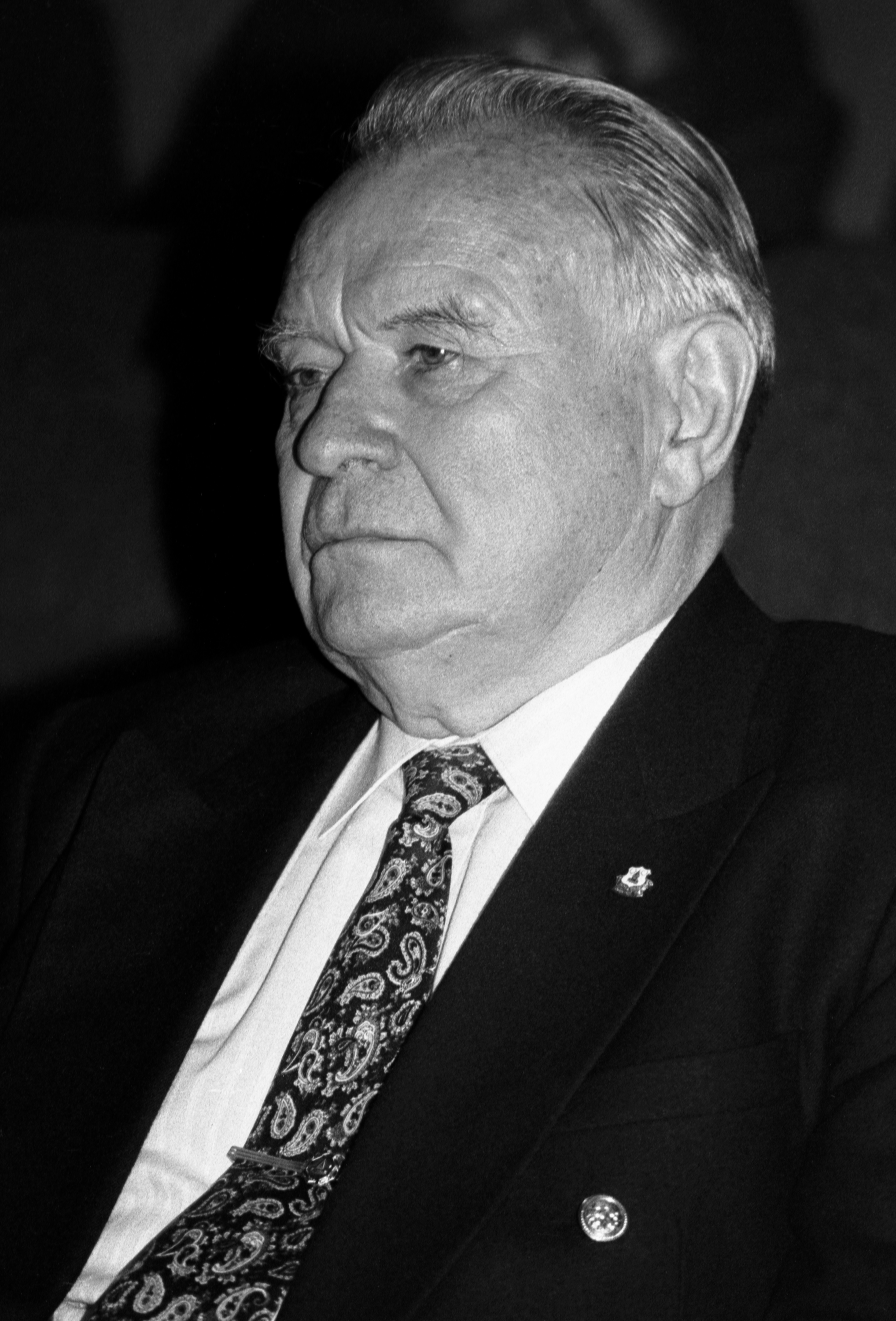
- Beskov in 1991

Personal information
- Full name: Konstantin Ivanovich Beskov
- Date of birth: 18 November 1920
- Place of birth: Moscow, RSFSR
- Date of death: 6 May 2006 (aged 85)
- Place of death: Moscow, Russia
- Height: 1.68 m (5 ft 6 in)
- Position: Striker

Senior career*
Years	Team	Apps	(Gls)
1937	Serp i Molot Moscow	?	(?)
1938–1940	Metallurg Moscow	45	(13)
1941–1954	Dynamo Moscow	196	(93)
Total		241	(109)

International career
1952	USSR	2	(0)

Managerial career
- 1956: Torpedo Moscow
- 1961–1962: CSKA
- 1963–1964: USSR
- 1964–1965: Zorya
- 1966: Lokomotiv Moscow
- 1967–1972: Dynamo Moscow
- 1974: USSR
- 1977–1988: Spartak Moscow
- 1979–1982: USSR
- 1991–1992: Asmaral
- 1994–1995: Dynamo Moscow
- * Club domestic league appearances and goals

Konstantin Ivanovich Beskov (Russian: Константи́н Ива́нович Бе́сков; 18 November 1920 – 6 May 2006) was a Soviet/Russian footballer and coach.

Beskov was born in Moscow. He played for Dynamo Moscow as forward, scoring 126 goals, and after finishing his playing career he became a successful manager who coached Dynamo and their rivals Spartak.

He also managed the USSR at the finals of Euro 64 and the 1982 World Cup.

== Sporting honours ==
=== As player ===
Dynamo Moscow

- Soviet Top League (2): 1945, 1949
- Soviet Cup (1): 1953

=== As manager ===
Spartak Moscow

- Soviet Top League (2): 1979, 1987
- USSR Federation Cup (1): 1987
- Soviet First League (1): 1977
- European Cup: Quarterfinalist 1981
- UEFA Cup: Quarterfinalist 1984

Dynamo Moscow

- Soviet Cup (2): 1967, 1970
- Russian Cup (1): 1995
- European Cup Winners' Cup: Runner-up 1972

Soviet Union

- UEFA European Championship: Runner-up 1964
- Summer Olympic Games Bronze Medal: 1980

Moscow XI

- Spartakiad of Peoples of the USSR (1): 1979

== Honours and awards ==
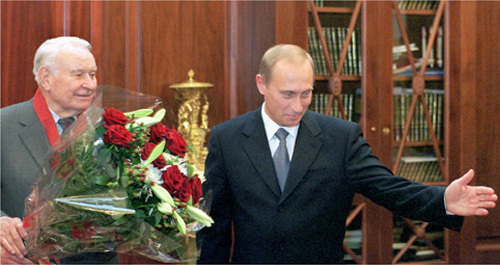
Awarding of the Order "For Merit to the Fatherland", 2nd class (November 22, 2000)

- Order of Merit for the Fatherland, 2nd class and 3rd class
- Order of Lenin
- Order of the Patriotic War, 2nd class
- Order of Friendship of Peoples
- Order of the Badge of Honour, twice (incl. 1957)
- Jubilee Medal "In Commemoration of the 100th Anniversary since the Birth of Vladimir Il'ich Lenin"
- Medal "For Valiant Labour in the Great Patriotic War 1941-1945"
- Jubilee Medal "Twenty Years of Victory in the Great Patriotic War 1941-1945"
- Jubilee Medal "Thirty Years of Victory in the Great Patriotic War 1941-1945"
- Medal "In Commemoration of the 850th Anniversary of Moscow"

== See also ==
- List of football managers with the most matches
