= 1945 Soviet Cup =

1945 Cup of USSR in Football
Кубок СССР

Tournament details
- Country: Soviet Union
- Dates: September 9 – October 14
- Teams: 32

Final positions
- Champions: CDKA Moscow (1st title)
- Runners-up: Dinamo Tbilisi
- Semifinalists: Zenit Leningrad; Traktor Stalingrad

The 1945 Soviet Cup was an association football cup competition of the Soviet Union.

The competition included all 30 teams of masters (12 from Pervaya Gruppa and 18 from Vtoraya Gruppa) and two additional: Torpedo Moscow reserves as Zavod imeni Stalina Moscow and Dinamo Alma-Ata. Torpedo Moscow was allowed to field additional team for winning the 1944 VTsSPS Cup.

Traktor Stalingrad all its home games played in Moscow instead of Stalingrad.

== Participating teams ==
Enter in First Round
| Pervaya Grouppa 12/12 teams | Vtoraya Grouppa 18/18 teams | Additional 2 teams |
| ✓ Dynamo Moscow; ✓ CDKA Moscow; ✓ Torpedo Moscow; ✓ Dynamo Tbilisi; ✓ Dynamo Leningrad; ✓ Zenit Leningrad; ✓ Traktor Stalingrad; ✓ Krylia Sovetov Moscow; ✓ Dynamo Minsk; ✓ Spartak Moscow; ✓ Dynamo Kiev; ✓ Lokomotiv Moscow | ✓ Krylia Sovetov Kuibyshev; ✓ VVS Moscow; ✓ MVO Moscow; ✓ DKA Tbilisi; ✓ Stakhanovets Stalino; ✓ Torpedo Gorky; ✓ Pischevik Odessa; ✓ Lokomotiv Kharkov; ✓ Krylya Sovetov Molotov; ✓ Tekstilshchik Ivanovo; ✓ DKA Novosibirsk; ✓ Dinamo Yerevan; ✓ Traktor Chelyabinsk; ✓ Dinamo Baku; ✓ KBF Leningrad; ✓ Uralmash Sverdlovsk; ✓ Spartak Leningrad; ✓ Trudovye Rezervy Moscow | ✓ Avtozavod imeni Stalina Moscow; ✓ Dinamo Alma-Ata |

Source: []

== Competition schedule ==
=== First round ===
[Sep 9] 
DINAMO Alma-Ata              3-0  Traktor Chelyabinsk 
DINAMO Baku                  2-0  Zenit Sverdlovsk 
[Sep 16] 
DINAMO Yerevan               4-2  DKA Novosibirsk             [aet] 
DKA Tbilisi                  3-3  Krylya Sovetov Molotov 
[Sep 20] 
Dinamo Kiev                  0-2  LOKOMOTIV Kharkov 
  [Anatoliy Gorokhov 35, Boris Gurkin 89 pen] 
[Sep 23] 
DINAMO Ivanovo               3-2  BaltFlot Leningrad          [aet] 
  [Alexei Yeryomin 90, 97, 112 - ?] 
Dinamo Minsk                 3-4  STAKHANOVETS Stalino 
  [Viktor Polunin-2, Boris Chitaia pen – Oleg Zhukov-2, Ivan Mitronov, Vasiliy Bryushin] 
Torpedo Gorkiy               0-3  TORPEDO Moskva 
  [Vasiliy Panfilov pen, ?, ?] 
ZENIT Leningrad              1-0  MVO Moskva                  [aet] 
  [Boris Chuchelov 107] 
[Sep 25] 
Spartak Leningrad            1-6  DINAMO Moskva 
  [Georgiy Lasin 52 pen – Konstantin Beskov 18, Vasiliy Trofimov 25, Sergei Solovyov 37, 68, Anatoliy Mishuk (S) 42 og, Nikolai Dementyev 79] 
[Sep 27] 
DINAMO Tbilisi               2-0  Pishchevik Odessa          [in Moskva] 
  [Boris Frolov 10, Boris Paichadze 85] 
[Sep 28] 
CDKA Moskva                  3-0  VVS Moskva 
  [Ivan Shcherbakov, Vsevolod Bobrov, Vladimir Dyomin] 
DINAMO Leningrad             5-1  Lokomotiv Moskva 
  [Anatoliy Viktorov-3, Oreshkin, Alexandr I.Fyodorov - ?] 
KRYLYA SOVETOV Moskva        3-1  Krylya Sovetov Kuibyshev 
  [Alexandr Sevidov-2, Igor Gorshkov – Sergei Rumyantsev] 
SPARTAK Moskva               3-1  Trudoviye Rezervy Moskva 
  [Viktor Semyonov-2 Oleg Timakov - ?] 
ZiS Moskva     1-2  TRAKTOR Stalingrad 
  [? – Pyotr Kalmykov 1, 3]

==== First round replays ====
[Sep 17] 
DKA Tbilisi                  5-0  Krylya Sovetov Molotov

=== Second round ===
[Sep 16] 
DINAMO Alma-Ata              2-1  Dinamo Baku         [in Krasnodar] 
[Sep 23] 
DKA Tbilisi                  3-0  Dinamo Yerevan 
[Sep 26] 
ZENIT Leningrad              3-1  Lokomotiv Kharkov 
  [Sergei Salnikov-2 Boris Chuchelov - ?] 
[Sep 29] 
DINAMO Moskva                5-2  Torpedo Moskva 
  [Sergei Solovyov 12, Alexandr Malyavkin 28, Leonid Solovyov 38 pen, Konstantin Beskov 64, Nikolai Dementyev 82 – Kuzin 21, Vasiliy Panfilov 40 pen] 
[Sep 30] 
CDKA Moskva                  5-1  Krylya Sovetov Moskva 
  [Alexei Grinin-2 (1 pen), Vladimir Dyomin-2, Valentin Nikolayev - ?] 
DINAMO Leningrad             3-2  Stakhanovets Stalino 
  [Vasiliy Lotkov 75 pen, ?, Yevgeniy Arkhangelskiy ? – Alexandr Andreyenko 4, Oleg Zhukov 19] 
[Oct 1] 
Spartak Moskva               1-2  DINAMO Tbilisi 
  [Nikolai Gulyayev 44 – Viktor Berezhnoi 20, Boris Paichadze 25] 
[Oct 2] 
TRAKTOR Stalingrad           2-0  Dinamo Ivanovo      [in Moskva] 
  [Yuriy Belousov 43, Alexandr Sapronov 88]

=== Quarterfinals ===
[Oct 4] 
ZENIT Leningrad              2-1  DKA Tbilisi 
  [Sergei Salnikov 43, Viktor Bodrov 88 pen - ?] 
[Oct 5] 
CDKA Moskva                  1-0  Dinamo Tbilisi 
  [Vsevolod Bobrov 57] 
TRAKTOR Stalingrad           1-0  Dinamo Alma-Ata     [in Moskva] 
  [Sergei Papkov 82] 
[Oct 6] 
DINAMO Moskva                4-0  Dinamo Leningrad 
  [Nikolai Dementyev 7, Konstantin Beskov 18, Sergei Solovyov 42, 57]

=== Semifinals ===
[Oct 9] 
CDKA Moskva             7-0  Zenit Leningrad 
  [Vsevolod Bobrov 14, 57, ?, 85, Vladimir Dyomin 34, Valentin Nikolayev 49, ?] 
[Oct 10] 
DINAMO Moskva           3-1  Traktor Stalingrad 
  [Konstantin Beskov 35, 50, Sergei Solovyov 75 – Viktor Shvedchenko 33]

=== Final ===
14 October 1945

| CDKA Moscow | 2 – 1 | Dinamo Moscow |
|---|---|---|
| Nikolayev 44'; Vinogradov 65' | [ Report] | Solovyov 9' |

Moscow
