= Nikolay Dementyev =

Russian footballer and coach

Personal information
- Full name: Nikolay Timofeyevich Dementyev (Russian: Николай Тимофеевич Дементьев)
- Date of death: 5 June 1994
- Place of death: Moscow
- Position: Forward

Senior career*
Years	Team	Apps	(Gls)
- S. Khalturin Factory
- Dynamo Leningrad
- Spartak Leningrad
- DKA
1940–1945	Dynamo Moscow		
1946–1954	Spartak Leningrad		

International career
1952	USSR National Team	8	

Managerial career
- 1956–1959: FSzM Moscow
- 1959–1965: Spartak Moscow
- 1965–1966: Karpaty Lviv
- 1967–1968: Shinnik Yaroslavl
Medal record
Dynamo Moscow
First place	Soviet Top League	1940
Spartak Leningrad
First place	Soviet Top League	1952
First place	Soviet Top League	1953
First place	Soviet Cup	1946
First place	Soviet Cup	1947
First place	Soviet Cup	1953
- * Club domestic league appearances and goals

Nikolay Timofeyevich Dementyev (Russian: Николай Тимофеевич Дементьев; 27 July 1915 – 5 June 1994) was a Soviet and Russian football striker and a coach.

== Career ==
In 1929, he began his playing career in the team works S. Khalturin Factory in Leningrad. Then he performed in Leningrad clubs Dynamo, Spartak and DKA. In 1940 he moved to Dynamo Moscow. After the Great Patriotic War in 1946 he was a player of Spartak Leningrad. In 1954 he finished his playing career.

On 24 May 1952, he debuted in the representation of the Soviet Union in an unofficial match against Hungary (1–1). He played a total of 8 unofficial games for the USSR.

In 1956 he started his coaching. He first worked with youth in FSzM Moscow. From 1959, he helped train Spartak Moscow. In the years 1965–66 he managed Karpaty Lviv. Then again he helped train Spartak Moscow and Karpaty Lviv. In the years 1967–68 he led FC Shinnik Yaroslavl. From 1969 to 1983 he coached a club in Moscow. He was Champion of the USSR (1940, 1952, 1953) and USSR Cup winner (1946, 1947, 1950). In the USSR championships held 273 matches and scored 89 goals. He died on 5 June 1994 in Moscow.

Pyotr (Peka) Dementyev, also a footballer, was a brother of Nikolay.
