= Vasili Kartsev =

Soviet footballer and coach

Personal information
- Full name: Vasili Mikhailovich Kartsev
- Date of birth: 9 April 1920
- Place of birth: Yegoryevsk, Russia
- Date of death: 11 April 1987 (aged 67)
- Place of death: Ryazan, Russian SFSR
- Height: 1.69 m (5 ft 6 1/2 in)
- Position: Striker

Senior career*
Years	Team	Apps	(Gls)
1939–1940	FC Lokomotiv Moscow	39	(16)
1945–1951	FC Dynamo Moscow	106	(72)

Managerial career
- 1955: FC Dynamo Yaroslavl
- 1956: FC Dynamo Rostov-on-Don
- 1957–1958: FC Dynamo Sverdlovsk
- 1959–1960: FC Spartak Ryazan
- 1961: FC Spartak Ryazan
- * Club domestic league appearances and goals

Vasili Mikhailovich Kartsev (Russian: Василий Михайлович Карцев; 9 April 1920 – 11 April 1987) was a Soviet professional football player and coach.

== Honours ==
- Soviet Top League champion: 1945, 1949.
- Soviet Top League runner-up: 1946, 1947, 1948, 1950.
- Soviet Cup finalist: 1945.
