= Sergey Solovyov (footballer) =

Soviet footballer

Sergei Solovyov
Personal information
- Full name: Sergei Aleksandrovich Solovyov
- Date of birth: 9 March 1915
- Place of birth: Sokol, Vologda Governorate, Russian Empire
- Date of death: 11 February 1967 (aged 51)
- Place of death: Moscow, Russian SFSR, Soviet Union
- Height: 1.75 m (5 ft 9 in)
- Position: Forward

Senior career*
Years	Team	Apps	(Gls)
1939	FC Dynamo Leningrad	22	(11)
1940–1952	FC Dynamo Moscow	209	(135)

Managerial career
- 1954–1966: FC Dynamo Moscow (youth teams)
- * Club domestic league appearances and goals

Sergei Aleksandrovich Solovyov (Russian: Серге́й Алекса́ндрович Соловьёв; born 9 March 1915; died 11 February 1967) was a Soviet professional footballer.

== Club career ==
He made his professional debut in the Soviet Top League in 1939 for FC Dynamo Leningrad. He also played ice hockey and bandy professionally.

== Career statistics ==
Appearances and goals by club, season, and competition. Only official games are included in this table.
Club	Season	Soviet Top League		Soviet Cup		Moscow Championship		Total	
Club	Season	Apps	Goals	Apps	Goals	Apps	Goals	Apps	Goals
Dynamo Leningrad	1939	22	11	0	0	0	0	22	11
Dynamo Moscow
Dynamo Moscow	1940	24	21	0	0	0	0	24	21
Dynamo Moscow	1941	10	7	0	0	10	46	20	53
Dynamo Moscow	1942	0	0	0	0	18	13	18	13
Dynamo Moscow	1943	0	0	0	0	6	7	6	7
Dynamo Moscow	1944	0	0	1	0	12	5	13	5
Dynamo Moscow	1945	22	18	5	7	0	0	27	25
Dynamo Moscow	1946	22	17	2	0	0	0	24	17
Dynamo Moscow	1947	24	12	1	1	0	0	25	13
Dynamo Moscow	1948	28	26	4	1	0	0	32	27
Dynamo Moscow	1949	30	10	4	1	0	0	34	11
Dynamo Moscow	1950	20	14	4	7	0	0	23	21
Dynamo Moscow	1951	19	8	2	0	0	0	21	8
Dynamo Moscow	1952	10	2	1	0	0	0	11	2
Dynamo Moscow	Total	231	146	24	17	46	58	301	221

== Honours ==
- Most league goals ever for FC Dynamo Moscow: 135.
- Soviet Top League top scorer: 1940, 1948.
- Soviet Top League champion: 1940, 1945, 1949.
- Soviet Top League runner-up: 1946, 1947, 1948, 1950.
- Soviet Top League bronze: 1952.
- Soviet Cup finalist: 1945, 1949, 1950.
- Soviet Hockey League champion: 1947.
- Soviet bandy champion: 1951, 1952.
