= 2021–22 FC Dynamo Moscow season =

FC Dynamo Moscow
2021–22 season
- Chairman: Vacant
- Head coach: Sandro Schwarz
- Stadium: VTB Arena
- Premier League: 3rd
- Russian Cup: Runners Up vs Spartak Moscow
- Top goalscorer: League: Daniil Fomin (10); All: Daniil Fomin (12)
- Highest home attendance: 25,018 vs Sochi (21 May 2022)
- Lowest home attendance: 0 vs Nizhny Novgorod (1 March 2022)
- Average home league attendance: 9,000 (21 May 2022)
Home colours	Away colours

The 2021–22 Dynamo Moscow season was the club's 99th season and fifth season back in the Russian Premier League, following their promotion in 2016–17.

== Squad ==
As of 21 February 2022

Note: Flags indicate national team as defined under FIFA eligibility rules; some limited exceptions apply. Players may hold more than one non-FIFA nationality.

No.	Pos.	Nation	Player
1	GK	RUS	Anton Shunin
2	DF	URU	Guillermo Varela
3	DF	RUS	Zaurbek Pliyev
4	DF	RUS	Sergei Parshivlyuk
5	DF	PAR	Fabián Balbuena
7	DF	RUS	Dmitri Skopintsev
8	MF	CRO	Nikola Moro
9	FW	CMR	Clinton N'Jie
15	DF	RUS	Saba Sazonov
16	GK	RUS	Ivan Budachyov
18	DF	UKR	Ivan Ordets
19	FW	RUS	Daniil Lesovoy

No.	Pos.	Nation	Player
20	FW	RUS	Vyacheslav Grulyov
24	DF	RUS	Roman Yevgenyev
25	MF	RUS	Denis Makarov
31	GK	RUS	Igor Leshchuk
40	FW	RUS	Fyodor Smolov
47	MF	RUS	Arsen Zakharyan
50	DF	RUS	Aleksandr Kutitsky
53	MF	POL	Sebastian Szymański
70	FW	RUS	Konstantin Tyukavin
74	MF	RUS	Daniil Fomin
91	FW	RUS	Yaroslav Gladyshev
93	DF	URU	Diego Laxalt

=== Out on loan ===
Note: Flags indicate national team as defined under FIFA eligibility rules; some limited exceptions apply. Players may hold more than one non-FIFA nationality.

No.	Pos.	Nation	Player
—	DF	RUS	Sergei Slepov (at FC Rotor Volgograd)
—	MF	GEO	Luka Gagnidze (at FC Ural Yekaterinburg)
—	MF	RUS	Vladislav Galkin (at RFS)
—	MF	RUS	Ilya Gomanyuk (at FC Volgar Astrakhan)

No.	Pos.	Nation	Player
—	MF	RUS	Vladislav Karapuzov (at FC Akhmat Grozny)
—	MF	RUS	Igor Shkolik (at FC Rotor Volgograd)
—	FW	RUS	Maksim Danilin (at FC Neftekhimik Nizhnekamsk)
—	FW	RUS	Nikolay Komlichenko (at FC Rostov)

== Transfers ==
=== In ===
Date	Position	Nationality	Name	From	Fee	Ref.
22 June 2021	DF	(Uruguay)	Diego Laxalt	AC Milan	Undisclosed	
9 July 2021	DF	(Paraguay)	Fabián Balbuena	Unattached	Free	
9 July 2021	DF	(Russia)	Saba Sazonov	Zenit St. Petersburg	Undisclosed	
17 July 2021	DF	(Uruguay)	Guillermo Varela	Copenhagen	Undisclosed	
6 August 2021	MF	(Russia)	Denis Makarov	Rubin Kazan	Undisclosed	
12 January 2022	FW	(Russia)	Fyodor Smolov	Lokomotiv Moscow	Undisclosed	

=== Out ===
Date	Position	Nationality	Name	To	Fee	Ref.
16 June 2021	FW	(Germany)	Maximilian Philipp	Wolfsburg	€7,500,000	

=== Loans out ===
Date from	Position	Nationality	Name	To	Date to	Ref.
11 June 2021	FW	(Russia)	Nikolai Komlichenko	Rostov	End of season	
12 June 2021	MF	(Russia)	Ihor Kalinin	Ural Yekaterinburg	End of season	
15 June 2021	MF	(Russia)	Ilya Gomanyuk	Volgar Astrakhan	End of season	
18 June 2021	MF	(Russia)	Igor Shkolik	Rotor Volgograd	End of season	
22 June 2021	DF	(Russia)	Sergei Slepov	Rotor Volgograd	End of season	
24 June 2021	FW	(Russia)	Maksim Danilin	Neftekhimik Nizhnekamsk	End of season	
21 July 2021	DF	(Georgia (country))	Luka Gagnidze	Ural Yekaterinburg	End of season	
24 July 2021	MF	(Russia)	Vladislav Karapuzov	Akhmat Grozny	End of season	
15 February 2022	MF	(Russia)	Vladislav Galkin	RFS	End of season	

=== Released ===
Date	Position	Nationality	Name	Joined	Date	Ref
4 August 2021	MF	(Portugal)	Miguel Cardoso	Kayserispor	9 August 2021	
7 January 2022	FW	(Nigeria)	Sylvester Igboun	Nizhny Novgorod	20 February 2022	
26 January 2022	MF	(Russia)	Anton Terekhov	Neftekhimik Nizhnekamsk	7 February 2022	
6 February 2022	DF	(Russia)	Grigori Morozov	Celje	14 February 2022	

== Friendlies ==
20 January 2022	Dynamo Moscow	12 – 0	Qatar Armed Forces	Doha, Qatar
17:15 MSK (UTC+3)	Smolov 27' (pen.), 31' (pen.); K.Zhukovsky 45'; Tyukavin 49', 80'; Skopintsev 57'; Gladyshev 66', 84'; A.Mazurin 69', 90'; Sazonov 78'; Fomin 88' (pen.)	Report		Stadium: Aspire Academy

28 January 2022	Dynamo Moscow	1 – 3	CSKA Sofia	Belek, Turkey
17:00 MSK (UTC+3)	Ordets 61'	Report	Turitsov 24' (pen.); Charles 45+1'; M.Garcez 87'	Stadium: Regnum Carya Golf & Resort Spa

31 January 2022	Dynamo Moscow	2 – 0	Yenisey Krasnoyarsk	Belek, Turkey
17:00 MSK (UTC+3)	Makarov 32'; Smolov 68'	Report		Stadium: Regnum Carya Golf & Resort Spa

1 February 2022	Dynamo Moscow	1 – 2	MFK Ružomberok	Belek, Turkey
16:00 MSK (UTC+3)	Tyukavin 14'	Report	Lichý 25'; Rymarenko 79'	Stadium: Regnum Carya Golf & Resort Spa

2 February 2022	Dynamo Moscow	2 – 1	Partizan	Belek, Turkey
16:00 MSK (UTC+3)	Fomin 5'; Galkin 88'	Report	Natkho 65'	Stadium: Regnum Carya Golf & Resort Spa

10 February 2022	Dynamo Moscow	0 – 1	Dinamo Tbilisi	Belek, Turkey
11:00 MSK (UTC+3)		Report	U.Kamara 20'	Stadium: Regnum Carya Golf & Resort Spa

10 February 2022	Dynamo Moscow	2 – 1	Sochi	Belek, Turkey
17:00 MSK (UTC+3)	G.Sulakvelidze 11'; Smolov 47'	Report	Prutsev 83'	Stadium: Regnum Carya Golf & Resort Spa

13 February 2022	Dynamo Moscow	1 – 1	RFS	Belek, Turkey
17:00 MSK (UTC+3)	Zakharyan 47'	Report	Ilić 22'	Stadium: Arcadia Sport Resort

15 February 2022	Dynamo Moscow	2 – 2	Vendsyssel	Belek, Turkey
17:00 MSK (UTC+3)	Tyukavin 19', 30'	Report	Armenakas 16'; Z.Hyltoft 59'	Stadium: Regnum Carya Golf & Resort Spa

17 February 2022	Dynamo Moscow	0 – 0	Alania Vladikavkaz	Belek, Turkey
11:00 MSK (UTC+3)		Report		Stadium: Regnum Carya Golf & Resort Spa

17 February 2022	Dynamo Moscow	2 – 2	Rubin Kazan	Belek, Turkey
17:00 MSK (UTC+3)	Zakharyan 40'; Fomin 48'	Report	Talbi 45'; Kvaratskhelia 70'

== Competitions ==
=== Overview ===
Competition	First match	Last match	Starting round	Final position	Record							
Competition	First match	Last match	Starting round	Final position	Pld	W	D	L	GF	GA	GD	Win %
Premier League	23 July 2021	21 May 2022	Matchday 1	3rd	30	16	5	9	53	41	+12	53.33
Russian Cup	22 September 2021	29 May 2022	Round of 32	Runners Up	6	4	1	1	17	3	+14	66.67
Total					36	20	6	10	70	44	+26	55.56

Last updated: 29 May 2022
Source: FBref

=== Premier League ===
==== League table ====
Pos	Team	Pld	W	D	L	GF	GA	GD	Pts
1	Zenit Saint Petersburg (C)	30	19	8	3	66	28	+38	65
2	Sochi	30	17	5	8	54	30	+24	56
3	Dynamo Moscow	30	16	5	9	53	41	+12	53
4	Krasnodar	30	14	8	8	42	30	+12	50 (Note: Head-to-head points: Krasnodar 4, CSKA Moscow 1.)
5	CSKA Moscow	30	15	5	10	42	29	+13	50

Source: Premier Liga
Rules for classification: 1) Points; 2) Head-to-head points; 3) Head-to-head matches won; 4) Head-to-head goal difference; 5) Head-to-head goals scored; 6) Matches won; 7) Goal difference; 8) Goals scored; 9) 2020–21 position (not applicable to final standings); 10) Play-off.
(C) Champions

==== Results summary ====
Overall								Home						Away					
Pld	W	D	L	GF	GA	GD	Pts	W	D	L	GF	GA	GD	W	D	L	GF	GA	GD
30	16	5	9	53	41	+12	53	7	3	5	25	19	+6	9	2	4	28	22	+6

Last updated: 21 May 2022.
Source: FBref

==== Results by round ====
Round	1	2	3	4	5	6	7	8	9	10	11	12	13	14	15	16	17	18	19	20	21	22	23	24	25	26	27	28	29	30
Ground	A	A	H	A	A	H	H	A	H	H	A	H	A	H	H	A	H	H	A	H	A	H	A	A	H	A	H	A	A	H
Result	W	W	W	L	W	D	L	W	W	L	D	W	L	W	W	W	W	D	W	L	W	D	W	W	W	L	L	L	D	L
Position	4	4	3	4	1	2	5	2	2	2	3	2	4	3	2	2	2	2	2	2	2	2	2	2	2	2	2	2	2	3

Updated to match(es) played on 21 May 2022. Source: See Results
A = Away; H = Home; W = Win; D = Draw; L = Loss

==== Results ====
23 July 2021 1	Rostov	0 – 2	Dynamo Moscow	Rostov-on-Don
20:00 MSK (UTC+3)	Sukhomlinov (yellow card) 30'; Hadžikadunić (yellow card) 40'	Report	Parshivlyuk (yellow card) 5'; Zakharyan 20'; Tyukavin 33'; Fomin (yellow card) 48'; Ordets (yellow card) 90+5'	Stadium: Rostov Arena; Attendance: 0 Referee: Vladimir Moskalyov
Note: Match played behind closed doors due to the COVID-19 pandemic in Russia.

31 July 2021 2	Ufa	2 – 3	Dynamo Moscow	Ufa
MSK (UTC+3)	Krotov (yellow card) 20'; Miletić (yellow card) 40'; Bauer (yellow card) 47'; Fishchenko (yellow card) 74' (yellow-red card) 75'; Agalarov 81', 86'	Report	Fomin 33' (pen.), 41' (pen.); Parshivlyuk (yellow card) 35'; Szymański (yellow card) 77' (goal) 89'; Balbuena (yellow card) 78'	Stadium: BetBoom Arena; Attendance: 669; Referee: Alexey Sukhoi

8 August 2021 3	Dynamo Moscow	2 – 1	CSKA Moscow	Moscow
20:00 MSK (UTC+3)	Fomin (yellow card) 21' (goal) 58' (pen.), 73'; Zakharyan (yellow card) 45+3'; Laxalt (yellow card) 72'	Report	Ejuke 8'; Bijol (yellow card) 57'	Stadium: VTB Arena; Attendance: 2,438; Referee: Vladislav Bezborodov

14 August 2021 4	Akhmat Grozny	2 – 1	Dynamo Moscow	Grozny
20:00 MSK (UTC+3)	Utkin 35'; Karapuzov 37' (yellow card) 42'; Nižić (yellow card) 45+'; Alsultanov (yellow card) 74'; Sheliya (yellow card) 85'	Report	Laxalt (yellow card) 34'; Makarov (yellow card) 45+'; Szymański 48'; Varela (yellow card) 61'; Skopintsev (yellow card) 72'; Ordets (yellow card) 90+'	Stadium: Akhmat-Arena; Attendance: 7,069; Referee: Sergey Ivanov

21 August 2021 5	Ural Yekaterinburg	0 – 1	Dynamo Moscow	Yekaterinburg
18:00 MSK (UTC+3)	Bicfalvi (yellow card) 31' (yellow-red card) 32'; Jovičić (yellow card) 90+4'	Report	Laxalt (yellow card) 11'; Tyukavin 17'; Skopintsev (yellow card) 80'	Stadium: Central Stadium; Attendance: 460; Referee: Ivan Sidekov

27 August 2021 6	Dynamo Moscow	1 – 1	Lokomotiv Moscow	Moscow
19:00 MSK (UTC+3)	Szymański 41' (yellow card) 46'	Report	Smolov 23'; Rybus (yellow card) 29'; Zhemaletdinov (yellow card) 33'; Barinov (yellow card) 64' (yellow-red card) 90+4'; Beka Beka (yellow card) 90+1'	Stadium: VTB Arena; Attendance: 2,697; Referee: Kirill Levnikov

12 September 2021 7	Dynamo Moscow	1 – 2	Nizhny Novgorod	Moscow
19:00 MSK (UTC+3)	Makarov 13'; Varela (yellow card) 71'; N'Jie (penalty missed) 89'	Report	Masoero (yellow card) 8' (yellow-red card) 88'; Suleymanov (penalty missed) 52'; Yuldoshev (yellow card) 56'; Gorbunov 75'; Kalinsky 83'	Stadium: VTB Arena; Attendance: 7,146; Referee: Vitali Meshkov

19 September 2021 8	Sochi	0 – 1	Dynamo Moscow	Sochi
19:00 MSK (UTC+3)		Report	Zakharyan 12'	Stadium: Fisht Olympic Stadium; Attendance: 498; Referee: Vasily Kazartsev

26 September 2021 9	Dynamo Moscow	2 – 0	Rubin Kazan	Moscow
14:00 MSK (UTC+3)	Fomin 32'; Grulyov 59'; Szymański (yellow card) 68'; Varela (yellow card) 73'; Igboun (yellow card) 89'	Report	Kostyukov (yellow card) 21'; Despotović (yellow card) 40'; Abildgaard (yellow card) 52'; Kvaratskhelia (yellow card) 64'; Uremović (yellow card) 86'; Bakayev (yellow card) 88'	Stadium: VTB Arena; Attendance: 7,101; Referee: Alexey Sukhoi

2 October 2021 10	Dynamo Moscow	0 – 1	Krylia Sovetov	Moscow
16:30 MSK (UTC+3)	Makarov (yellow card) 11'; Zakharyan (yellow card) 71'	Report	Yezhov 23'; Chernov (yellow card) 30'; Lomayev (yellow card) 65'; Yakuba (yellow card) 90+6'	Stadium: VTB Arena; Attendance: 7,437; Referee: Evgeny Kukulyak

16 October 2021 11	Spartak Moscow	2 – 2	Dynamo Moscow	Moscow
19:00 MSK (UTC+3)	Dzhikiya (yellow card) 44' (goal) 87'; Gigot (yellow card) 44' (goal) 90+1'	Report	Fomin (yellow card) 13'; Ordets 19'; N'Jie (yellow card) 24'; Yevgenyev (yellow card) 35'; Zakharyan (yellow card) 44'; Grulyov (yellow card) 44'; Szymański (yellow card) 47'; Tyukavin 60'	Stadium: Otkritie Arena; Attendance: 10,443; Referee: Sergei Karasev

22 October 2021 12	Dynamo Moscow	4 – 1	Khimki	Moscow
19:00 MSK (UTC+3)	Moro 12'; Grulyov 26', 60'; Tyukavin 52'	Report	Kamyshev (yellow card) 8'; Ademi 90'	Stadium: VTB Arena; Attendance: 6,247; Referee: Ivan Sidekov

29 October 2021 13	Zenit St.Petersburg	4 – 1	Dynamo Moscow	Saint Petersburg
19:00 MSK (UTC+3)	Claudinho 8'; Wendel (yellow card) 45+1' (goal) 66'; Karavayev (yellow card) 55'; Lovren (yellow card) 62'; Dzyuba 69'; Rakitskyi 85'	Report	Skopintsev (yellow card) 25'; Fomin (yellow card) 51' (goal) 56'; Zakharyan (yellow card) 76'; Ordets (yellow card) 79'	Stadium: Krestovsky Stadium; Attendance: 18,190; Referee: Sergei Karasev

6 November 2021 14	Dynamo Moscow	1 – 0	Krasnodar	Moscow
16:30 MSK (UTC+3)	Tyukavin (yellow card) 31'; Kutitsky (yellow card) 57'; Grulyov 73'	Report	Spertsyan (yellow card) 90+'	Stadium: VTB Arena; Attendance: 7,475; Referee: Vladimir Moskalyov

21 November 2021 15	Dynamo Moscow	5 – 1	Arsenal Tula	Moscow
16:30 MSK (UTC+3)	Szymański 15'; Balbuena 22' (yellow card) 74'; Grulyov 25', 27'; Zakharyan 60'; Makarov (yellow card) 82'	Report	Kostadinov (yellow card) 7'; Radaković (yellow card) 58'; Khlusevich 85'; K.Kangwa (yellow card) 90'	Stadium: VTB Arena; Attendance: 6,579; Referee: Vitali Meshkov

28 November 2021 16	Rubin Kazan	2 – 3	Dynamo Moscow	Kazan
16:30 MSK (UTC+3)	Bakayev 30'; Dreyer 49' (pen.); Onugkha (yellow card) 59'; Zotov (yellow card) 65'; Musayev (yellow card) 88'	Report	Makarov 18'; Grulyov (yellow card) 44'; Varela (yellow card) 49'; Moro (penalty missed) 66'; Balbuena 68'; Skopintsev (yellow card) 78'; Szymański 85'	Stadium: Ak Bars Arena; Attendance: 3,526; Referee: Kirill Levnikov

5 December 2021 17	Dynamo Moscow	2 – 0	Ufa	Moscow
16:30 MSK (UTC+3)	Makarov 29'; Grulyov (yellow card) 45+3'; Zakharyan 86'	Report	Krotov (red card) 6'; Cacintura (red card) 36'; Botaka (yellow card) 75'; Belenov (yellow card) 81'	Stadium: VTB Arena; Attendance: 7,437; Referee: Vladislav Bezborodov

12 December 2021 18	Dynamo Moscow	1 – 1	Zenit St.Petersburg	Moscow
14:00 MSK (UTC+3)	Moro (yellow card) 69'; Skopintsev 72'	Report	Claudinho (penalty missed) 11' 32'; Douglas (yellow card) 45+'	Stadium: VTB Arena; Attendance: 17,494; Referee: Sergei Karasev

26 February 2022 19	Khimki	0 – 3	Dynamo Moscow	Khimki
14:00 MSK (UTC+3)	Dagerstål (red card) 45'; Mirzov (yellow card) 54'; Nicholas (red card) 67'	Report	Smolov 35'; Yevgenyev (yellow card) 38' (yellow-red card) 52'; Szymański 85'; Fomin 89'	Stadium: Arena Khimki; Attendance: 2,198; Referee: Kirill Levnikov

6 March 2022 20	Dynamo Moscow	0 – 2	Spartak Moscow	Moscow
19:00 MSK (UTC+3)	Grulyov (yellow card) 3'; Varela (yellow card) 42' (yellow-red card) 45+3'; Zakharyan (yellow card) 65'	Report	Caufriez (yellow card) 1'; Nicholson 26'; Promes 37'; Ayrton (yellow card) 40'; Martins (yellow card) 72'; Umyarov (yellow card) 86'	Stadium: VTB Arena; Attendance: 19,353; Referee: Sergei Karasev

12 March 2022 21	Arsenal Tula	1 – 4	Dynamo Moscow	Tula
16:30 MSK (UTC+3)	E.Kangwa (yellow card) 8' (goal) 30'; K.Kangwa (yellow card) 18'; Despotović (yellow card) 35'; Kostadinov (yellow card) 37'	Report	Smolov 14'; Moro (yellow card) 45'; Zakharyan 46'; Fomin 76' (pen.); Tyukavin 90+'	Stadium: Arsenal Stadium; Attendance: 5,246; Referee: Yan Bobrovsky

20 March 2022 22	Dynamo Moscow	1 – 1	Rostov	Moscow
20:00 MSK (UTC+3)	Parshivlyuk (yellow card) 33'; Balbuena (yellow card) 80'; Smolov 90'	Report	Shchetinin (yellow card) 25'; Poloz 59'; Bayramyan (yellow card) 68'	Stadium: VTB Arena; Attendance: 14,127; Referee: Pavel Kukuyan

3 April 2022 23	Krasnodar	0 – 1	Dynamo Moscow	Krasnodar
14:00 MSK (UTC+3)	Krivtsov (yellow card) 9'; Borodin (yellow card) 23'; Chernikov (yellow card) 35'; Martynovich (yellow card) 39'; Ionov (yellow card) 90+'	Report	Balbuena (yellow card) 21'; Fomin 45+' (pen.); Szymański (yellow card) 54'	Stadium: Krasnodar Stadium; Attendance: 12,213; Referee: Alexey Sukhoi

9 April 2022 24	Nizhny Novgorod	0 – 1	Dynamo Moscow	Nizhny Novgorod
14:00 MSK (UTC+3)	Suleymanov (yellow card) 17'; Tkachuk (yellow card) 52'; Milson (yellow card) 69'; Masoero (yellow card) 88'	Report	Zakharyan (yellow card) 32'; Gotsuk 87' (o.g.)	Stadium: Nizhny Novgorod Stadium; Attendance: 14,155; Referee: Vitali Meshkov

15 April 2022 25	Dynamo Moscow	2 – 0	Akhmat Grozny	Moscow
19:30 MSK (UTC+3)	Utkin 35'; Karapuzov 37' (yellow card) 42'; Nižić (yellow card) 45+'; Alsultanov (yellow card) 74'; Sheliya (yellow card) 85'	Report	Laxalt (yellow card) 34'; Makarov (yellow card) 45+'; Szymański 48'; Varela (yellow card) 61'; Skopintsev (yellow card) 72'; Ordets (yellow card) 90+'	Stadium: VTB Arena; Attendance: 7,069; Referee: Sergey Ivanov

24 April 2022 26	CSKA Moscow	1 – 0	Dynamo Moscow	Moscow
19:30 MSK (UTC+3)	Ejuke 67'; Gbamin (yellow card) 89'; Fernandes (yellow card) 90+'	Report	Laxalt (yellow card) 38'; Yevgenyev (yellow card) 86'	Stadium: VEB Arena; Attendance: 13,321; Referee: Sergei Karasev

30 April 2022 27	Dynamo Moscow	2 – 3	Ural Yekaterinburg	Moscow
14:00 MSK (UTC+3)	Zakharyan 7'; N'Jie 80'; Skopintsev (yellow card) 80'	Report	Bicfalvi 10', 67'; Miškić 31'; Augustyniak (yellow card) 76'; Goglichidze (yellow card) 90+'	Stadium: VTB Arena; Attendance: 15,381; Referee: Pavel Kukuyan

6 May 2022 28	Krylia Sovetov	5 – 2	Dynamo Moscow	Samara
18:00 MSK (UTC+3)	Glushenkov 22', 71'; Sarveli 55'; Zinkovsky 80'; Pinyayev 90+'	Report	Moro (yellow card) 28'; Laxalt (yellow card) 35'; Balbuena 41'; Grulyov (yellow card) 55' (yellow-red card) 90+' (goal) 74'; Gladyshev (yellow card) 85'; Zakharyan (yellow card) 90'	Stadium: Solidarnost Arena; Attendance: 32,314; Referee: Vasili Kazartsev

14 May 2022 29	Lokomotiv Moscow	3 – 3	Dynamo Moscow	Moscow
16:30 MSK (UTC+3)	Jedvaj 28' (yellow card) 37'; Kuchta 65'; Kerk 72'; Zhivoglyadov (yellow card) 74'	Report	Smolov 9'; Zakharyan 33'; Fomin 38' (pen.) (yellow card) 46'; Skopintsev (yellow card) 56'	Stadium: RZD Arena; Attendance: 14,915; Referee: Sergey Ivanov

21 May 2022 30	Dynamo Moscow	1 – 5	Sochi	Moscow
17:00 MSK (UTC+3)	Noboa 8' (o.g.); Lesovoy (red card) 57'; Yevgenyev (yellow card) 90+'	Report	Yusupov 27'; Cassierra 33', 40', 68'; Terekhov (yellow card) 45+'; Noboa 45+' (pen.); Margasov (yellow card) 59'	Stadium: VTB Arena; Attendance: 25,018; Referee: Vladimir Moskalyov

=== Russian Cup ===
==== Round of 32 ====
Pos	Team	Pld	W	D	L	GF	GA	GD	Pts	Qualification
1	Dynamo Moscow (Q)	2	2	0	0	9	0	+9	6	Advance to Play-off
2	Orenburg	2	1	0	1	3	4	−1	3	
3	Dynamo Stavropol	2	0	0	2	1	9	−8	0	

Rules for classification: 1) Points; 2) Wins; 3) Goal differential; 4) Goals scored; 5) Head-to-head result; 6) Disciplinary points.
(Q) Qualified for the phase indicated

22 September 2021 2	Dynamo Stavropol	0 – 6	Dynamo Moscow	Stavropol
16:00 MSK (UTC+3)	Kuchiyev (yellow card) 84'	Report	Skopintsev 12'; Makarov 28' (yellow card) 43'; Tyukavin 35'; Fomin 46'; Kutitsky (yellow card) 68'; Gladyshev 71'; Igboun 83'	Stadium: Dynamo Stadium

26 October 2021 3	Orenburg	0 – 3	Dynamo Moscow	Orenburg
14:00 MSK (UTC+3)	Ayupov (yellow card) 20'; Stamatov (yellow card) 38'; Prudnikov (yellow card) 52'	Report	Tyukavin 8'; Moro 81'; Yevgenyev 87'	Stadium: Gazovik Stadium; Attendance: 498; Referee: S.Tsyganok

==== Knockout stage ====
1 March 2022 Round of 16	Dynamo Moscow	3 – 0	Nizhny Novgorod	Moscow
20:00 MSK (UTC+3)	Fomin 45+2' (pen.); Grulyov 54', (yellow card) 60'; Smolov 86' (pen.); Makarov (yellow card) 90'	Report	Yuldoshev (yellow card) 59'; Gotsuk (yellow card) 84'	Stadium: VTB Arena

19 April 2022 Quarterfinal	Baltika Kaliningrad	1 – 1 (4–5 p)	Dynamo Moscow	Kaliningrad
20:00 MSK (UTC+3)	Alshin (yellow card) 16'; Meshchaninov (yellow card) 59'; Popov (yellow card) 72'; Geloyan 84'	Report	Parshivlyuk (yellow card) 45'; Makarov 35'; Smolov (yellow card) 89'; Grulyov (yellow card) 90+2'	Stadium: Kaliningrad Stadium; Referee: Vladislav Bezborodov
	Penalties
	Aleynik (penalty missed); Popov (penalty scored); Alshin (penalty scored); Musayev (penalty scored); Kazayev (penalty scored)		(penalty scored) Szymański; (penalty scored) Smolov; (penalty scored) Zakharyan; (penalty scored) Lesovoy; (penalty scored) Fomin

10 May 2022 Semifinal	Dynamo Moscow	3 – 0	Alania Vladikavkaz	Moscow
16:30 MSK (UTC+3)	Smolov 22'; Zakharyan 48'; Szymański (yellow card) 67'; Tyukavin 87' (yellow card) 90'	Report	Shavlokhov (yellow card) 34' (red card) 73'; Butayev (yellow card) 80'; Bagayev (yellow card) 86'; Grigoryev (yellow card) 87'	Stadium: VTB Arena; Referee: Vitali Meshkov

==== Final ====
29 May 2022	Spartak Moscow	2 – 1	Dynamo Moscow	Moscow
17:00 MSK (UTC+3)	Sobolev 10' (yellow card) 81'; Khlusevich (yellow card) 26'; Promes 72'; Gigot (yellow card) 90+3'	Report	Zakharyan 55'; Fomin (penalty missed) 90+9'	Stadium: Luzhniki Stadium; Attendance: 69,306; Referee: Kirill Levnikov

== Squad statistics ==
As of match played 29 May 2022

=== Appearances and goals ===
No.	Pos	Nat	Player	Total		Premier League		Russian Cup	
No.	Pos	Nat	Player	Apps	Goals	Apps	Goals	Apps	Goals
1	GK	(Russia) RUS	Anton Shunin	26	0	26	0	0	0
2	DF	(Uruguay) URU	Guillermo Varela	29	0	19+5	0	2+3	0
3	DF	(Russia) RUS	Zaurbek Pliyev	3	0	0+2	0	0+1	0
4	DF	(Russia) RUS	Sergei Parshivlyuk	24	0	11+8	0	5	0
5	DF	(Paraguay) PAR	Fabián Balbuena	32	3	27	3	5	0
7	DF	(Russia) RUS	Dmitri Skopintsev	33	2	16+11	1	5+1	1
8	MF	(Croatia) CRO	Nikola Moro	34	2	28	1	4+2	1
9	FW	(Cameroon) CMR	Clinton N'Jie	22	1	6+13	1	2+1	0
15	DF	(Russia) RUS	Saba Sazonov	6	0	3+3	0	0	0
18	DF	(Ukraine) UKR	Ivan Ordets	19	1	18	1	1	0
19	FW	(Russia) RUS	Daniil Lesovoy	12	0	3+5	0	0+4	0
20	FW	(Russia) RUS	Vyacheslav Grulyov	30	8	17+9	7	2+2	1
24	DF	(Russia) RUS	Roman Yevgenyev	24	1	12+6	0	6	1
25	MF	(Russia) RUS	Denis Makarov	30	5	18+6	3	4+2	2
31	GK	(Russia) RUS	Igor Leshchuk	10	0	4	0	6	0
40	FW	(Russia) RUS	Fyodor Smolov	15	7	10+1	5	2+2	2
47	MF	(Russia) RUS	Arsen Zakharyan	34	9	28+1	7	5	2
50	DF	(Russia) RUS	Aleksandr Kutitsky	9	0	2+5	0	2	0
53	MF	(Poland) POL	Sebastian Szymański	32	6	26+1	6	4+1	0
70	FW	(Russia) RUS	Konstantin Tyukavin	35	9	14+16	6	5	3
74	MF	(Russia) RUS	Daniil Fomin	35	12	29	10	5+1	2
91	FW	(Russia) RUS	Yaroslav Gladyshev	9	1	0+7	0	0+2	1
93	DF	(Uruguay) URU	Diego Laxalt	16	0	13+1	0	1+1	0
Players away from the club on loan:
90	MF	(Russia) RUS	Vladislav Galkin	2	0	0+1	0	0+1	0
Players who left Dynamo Moscow during the season:
10	DF	(Nigeria) NGR	Sylvester Igboun	12	1	0+10	0	0+2	1

=== Goal scorers ===
Place	Position	Nation	Number	Name	Premier League	Russian Cup	Total
1	MF	(Russia)	74	Daniil Fomin	10	2	12
2	FW	(Russia)	70	Konstantin Tyukavin	6	3	9
2	MF	(Russia)	47	Arsen Zakharyan	7	2	9
4	FW	(Russia)	20	Vyacheslav Grulyov	7	1	8
5	FW	(Russia)	40	Fyodor Smolov	5	2	7
6	MF	(Poland)	53	Sebastian Szymański	6	0	6
7	MF	(Russia)	25	Denis Makarov	3	2	5
8	DF	(Paraguay)	5	Fabián Balbuena	3	0	3
9	MF	(Croatia)	8	Nikola Moro	1	1	2
9	DF	(Poland)	7	Dmitri Skopintsev	1	1	2
9				Own goal	2	0	2
12	DF	(Ukraine)	18	Ivan Ordets	1	0	1
12	FW	(Cameroon)	9	Clinton N'Jie	1	0	1
12	FW	(Russia)	91	Yaroslav Gladyshev	0	1	1
12	FW	(Nigeria)	10	Sylvester Igboun	0	1	1
12	DF	(Russia)	24	Roman Yevgenyev	0	1	1
				TOTALS	53	17	70

=== Clean sheets ===
Place	Position	Nation	Number	Name	Premier League	Russian Cup	Total
1	GK	(Russia)	1	Anton Shunin	8	0	8
2	GK	(Russia)	31	Igor Leshchuk	2	4	6
				TOTALS	10	4	14

=== Disciplinary record ===
Number	Nation	Position	Name	Premier League		Russian Cup		Total	
Number	Nation	Position	Name	Yellow card	Red card	Yellow card	Red card	Yellow card	Red card
2	(Uruguay)	DF	Guillermo Varela	6	1	0	0	6	1
4	(Russia)	DF	Sergei Parshivlyuk	3	0	1	0	4	0
5	(Paraguay)	DF	Fabián Balbuena	4	0	0	0	4	0
7	(Russia)	DF	Dmitri Skopintsev	6	0	0	0	6	0
8	(Croatia)	MF	Nikola Moro	4	0	0	0	4	0
9	(Cameroon)	FW	Clinton N'Jie	1	0	0	0	1	0
18	(Ukraine)	DF	Ivan Ordets	3	0	0	0	3	0
19	(Russia)	FW	Daniil Lesovoy	0	1	0	0	0	1
20	(Russia)	FW	Vyacheslav Grulyov	6	1	2	0	8	1
24	(Russia)	DF	Roman Yevgenyev	5	1	0	0	5	1
25	(Russia)	MF	Denis Makarov	3	0	2	0	5	0
40	(Russia)	FW	Fyodor Smolov	0	0	1	0	1	0
47	(Russia)	MF	Arsen Zakharyan	7	0	0	0	7	0
50	(Russia)	MF	Aleksandr Kutitsky	1	0	1	0	2	0
53	(Poland)	MF	Sebastian Szymański	5	0	1	0	6	0
70	(Russia)	FW	Konstantin Tyukavin	1	0	1	0	2	0
74	(Russia)	MF	Daniil Fomin	5	0	0	0	5	0
91	(Russia)	FW	Yaroslav Gladyshev	1	0	0	0	1	0
93	(Uruguay)	DF	Diego Laxalt	5	0	0	0	5	0
Players away on loan:
Players who left Dynamo Moscow during the season:
10	(Nigeria)	FW	Sylvester Igboun	1	0	0	0	1	0
			TOTALS	67	4	9	0	76	4
