= 2019–20 FC Dynamo Moscow season =

Dynamo Moscow
2019–20 season
- Chairman: Klochko Igor Petrovich
- Manager: Dmitri Khokhlov (until 5 October); Kirill Novikov (from 8 October, caretaker until 8 November)
- Stadium: VTB Arena
- Premier League: 6th
- Russian Cup: Round of 32 vs Luch Vladivostok
- Top goalscorer: League: Maximilian Philipp (8); All: Maximilian Philipp (8)
Home colours	Away colours

The 2019–20 Dynamo Moscow season was the club's 97th season and third campaign back in the Russian Premier League, following their relegation at the end of the 2015–16 season.

== Season events ==
On 5 October, following a 2–0 away defeat to Orenburg, Dmitri Khokhlov resigned as manager, with Kirill Novikov being appointed as caretaker manager on 8 October. One month later, and Novikov was confirmed as the new permanent manager of Dynamo Moscow.

On 17 March, the Russian Premier League postponed all league fixtures until April 10th due to the COVID-19 pandemic.

On 1 April, the Russian Football Union extended the suspension of football until 31 May.

On 15 May, the Russian Football Union announced that the Russian Premier League season would resume on 21 June.

On 21 June, the Krasnodar vs Dynamo Moscow match scheduled for the same day was postponed until 19 July due to an outbreak of COVID-19 in the Dynamo Moscow squad.

== Squad ==
As of 19 July 2020

Note: Flags indicate national team as defined under FIFA eligibility rules; some limited exceptions apply. Players may hold more than one non-FIFA nationality.

No.	Pos.	Nation	Player
1	GK	RUS	Anton Shunin
2	DF	RUS	Grigori Morozov
3	DF	RUS	Zaurbek Pliyev
4	DF	RUS	Vladimir Rykov
5	FW	GER	Maximilian Philipp
6	MF	RUS	Artur Yusupov
7	MF	POR	Miguel Cardoso
8	FW	RUS	Kirill Panchenko
9	FW	CMR	Clinton N'Jie
10	FW	NGR	Sylvester Igboun (on loan from Ufa)
11	MF	POL	Sebastian Szymański
13	DF	RUS	Igor Kalinin
15	DF	RUS	Roman Neustädter
17	DF	RUS	Sergei Parshivlyuk
18	DF	UKR	Ivan Ordets

No.	Pos.	Nation	Player
19	MF	RUS	Vladimir Moskvichyov
20	MF	RUS	Vyacheslav Grulyov
21	MF	RUS	Dmitri Skopintsev
22	MF	BRA	Joãozinho
23	MF	RUS	Anton Sosnin
24	DF	RUS	Roman Yevgenyev
27	FW	RUS	Nikolay Komlichenko
31	GK	RUS	Igor Leshchuk
34	MF	RUS	Konstantin Rausch
44	DF	BIH	Toni Šunjić
76	MF	RUS	Vladislav Karapuzov
77	MF	BFA	Charles Kaboré
88	MF	SWE	Oscar Hiljemark (on loan from Genoa)
90	FW	RUS	Nikolay Obolsky
—	FW	RUS	Timur Melekestsev

=== Out on loan ===
Note: Flags indicate national team as defined under FIFA eligibility rules; some limited exceptions apply. Players may hold more than one non-FIFA nationality.

No.	Pos.	Nation	Player
10	FW	LTU	Fiodor Černych (at Orenburg)
12	DF	RUS	Danil Lipovoy (at Orenburg)

No.	Pos.	Nation	Player
—	FW	RUS	Yevgeni Markov (at Rubin Kazan)
—	FW	RUS	Anton Terekhov (at Krylia Sovetov)

== Transfers ==
=== In ===
Date	Position	Nationality	Name	From	Fee	Ref.
31 May 2019	MF	(Poland)	Sebastian Szymański	Legia Warsaw	Undisclosed	
9 June 2019	DF	(Russia)	Zaurbek Pliyev	Akhmat Grozny	Undisclosed	
14 June 2019	DF	(Russia)	Ihor Kalinin	Rubin Kazan	Undisclosed	
19 June 2019	DF	(Ukraine)	Ivan Ordets	Shakhtar Donetsk	Undisclosed	
24 June 2019	DF	(Russia)	Sergei Parshivlyuk	Rostov	Undisclosed	
2 July 2019	FW	(Azerbaijan)	Ramil Sheydayev	Krylia Sovetov	Free	
17 July 2019	MF	(Burkina Faso)	Charles Kaboré	Krasnodar	Free	
25 July 2019	FW	(Cameroon)	Clinton N'Jie	Olympique Marseille	Undisclosed	
9 August 2019	DF	(Russia)	Roman Neustädter	Fenerbahçe	Undisclosed	
9 August 2019	FW	(Germany)	Maximilian Philipp	Borussia Dortmund	Undisclosed	
27 August 2019	MF	(Russia)	Vladislav Karapuzov	Lokomotiv Moscow	Undisclosed	
7 January 2020	MF	(Russia)	Dmitri Skopintsev	Krasnodar	Undisclosed	
25 January 2020	FW	(Russia)	Nikolay Komlichenko	Mladá Boleslav	Undisclosed	

=== Loans in ===
Date from	Position	Nationality	Name	From	Date to	Ref.
2 September 2019	MF	(Sweden)	Oscar Hiljemark	Genoa	End of Season	
2 September 2019	FW	(Nigeria)	Sylvester Igboun	Ufa	End of Season	

=== Out ===
Date	Position	Nationality	Name	To	Fee	Ref.
18 June 2019	DF	(Russia)	Maksim Nenakhov	Rotor Volgograd	Undisclosed	
28 June 2019	FW	(Russia)	Roman Pukhov	Fakel Voronezh	Undisclosed	
2 July 2019	MF	(Russia)	Maksim Kuzmin	Baltika Kaliningrad	Undisclosed	
11 July 2019	MF	(Russia)	Aleksandr Zotov	Yenisey Krasnoyarsk	Undisclosed	
1 August 2019	MF	(Mali)	Samba Sow	Nottingham Forest	Undisclosed	
5 August 2019	MF	(Ghana)	Abdul Aziz Tetteh	Gazişehir Gaziantep	Undisclosed	

=== Loans out ===
Date from	Position	Nationality	Name	To	Date to	Ref.
5 July 2019	FW	(Russia)	Yevgeni Markov	Rubin Kazan	End of Season	
11 July 2019	FW	(Russia)	Anton Terekhov	Krylia Sovetov	End of Season	
21 August 2019	MF	(Russia)	Vladimir Moskvichyov	Orenburg	9 January 200	
21 August 2019	FW	(Lithuania)	Fedor Černych	Orenburg	End of Season	
23 August 2019	DF	(Russia)	Danil Lipovoy	Orenburg	End of Season	
10 January 2020	MF	(Russia)	Vyacheslav Grulyov	Nizhny Novgorod	End of Season	
19 February 2020	MF	(Portugal)	Miguel Cardoso	Tambov	End of Season	
21 February 2020	DF	(Russia)	Ihor Kalinin	Ural Yekaterinburg	End of Season	

=== Released ===
Date	Position	Nationality	Name	Joined	Date
12 June 2019	DF	(Sweden)	Sebastian Holmén	Willem II	24 July 2019
12 June 2019	DF	(Russia)	Viktor Demyanov	Lokomotiv Moscow	
12 June 2019	MF	(Russia)	Ilya Panin	Lokomotiv Moscow	
14 June 2019	FW	(Russia)	Yevgeni Lutsenko	Arsenal Tula	16 June 2019
18 June 2019	GK	(Russia)	Ivan Zirikov	Tekstilshchik Ivanovo	26 June 2019
24 June 2019	DF	(Russia)	Aleksei Kozlov	Rostov	3 July 2019
4 July 2019	DF	(Russia)	Ivan Temnikov	Nizhny Novgorod	
9 January 2020	FW	(Azerbaijan)	Ramil Sheydayev	Sabah	17 February 2020
27 July 2020	DF	(Russia)	Vladimir Rykov	Ural Yekaterinburg	14 August 2020
27 July 2020	MF	(Russia)	Artur Yusupov	Sochi	7 September 2020
27 July 2020	FW	(Russia)	Kirill Panchenko	Tambov	6 August 2020
27 July 2020	DF	(Russia)	Roman Neustädter	Dynamo Moscow	15 October 2020
27 July 2020	MF	(Brazil)	Joãozinho	Sochi	11 August 2020
27 July 2020	MF	(Russia)	Anton Sosnin		
27 July 2020	GK	(Russia)	Yegor Sedov		
27 July 2020	GK	(Russia)	Vladislav Yarukov		
27 July 2020	MF	(Russia)	Roman Denisov		
27 July 2020	MF	(Russia)	Georgy Sulakvelidze		
27 July 2020	FW	(Russia)	Nikolay Obolsky	Barakaldo	29 August 2020

== Friendlies ==
8 September 2019	Dynamo Moscow	1 – 1	RFS	Moscow, Russia
17:00 MSK (UTC+3)	N'Jie 42'; Rykov (yellow card) 52'	Report	Kouadio 75'; Solovjovs (yellow card) 85'; Blagojević (yellow card) 88'	Stadium: VTB Arena; Referee: Anton Frolov

13 October 2019	Dynamo Moscow	2 – 0	Pyunik	Moscow, Russia
16:00 MSK (UTC+3)	Igboun (yellow card) 23'; Neustädter 67', 71'	Report		Stadium: VTB Novogorks-Dynamo Training Centre; Attendance: 0 Referee: Alexey Sukhoi

20 January 2020	Dynamo Moscow	5 – 1	Zagłębie Lubin	Turkey
17:00 MSK (UTC+3)	Philipp 43'; Igboun 59', 67', 78'; Panchenko 89'	Report	Tosik 85'

28 January 2020	Dynamo Moscow	0 – 2	Lechia Gdańsk	Turkey
16:30 MSK (UTC+3)		Report	Haraslín 40'; Tobers 73'

1 February 2020	Dynamo Moscow	3 – 1	Mladost Lučani	Turkey
11:00 MSK (UTC+3)	Rykov 9'; Panchenko 12', 15'	Report	Pavlović 40'

1 February 2020	Dynamo Moscow	2 – 0	Slovan Liberec	Turkey
17:00 MSK (UTC+3)	Komlichenko 71'; Danilin 88'	Report

5 February 2020	Dynamo Moscow	2 – 1	Ventspils	Turkey
11:00 MSK (UTC+3)	Panchenko 63'; Pliyev 89'	Report	Sakhnevych 27'

5 February 2020	Dynamo Moscow	1 – 0	Metallurg Bekabad	Turkey
17:00 MSK (UTC+3)	Philipp 39'	Report

13 February 2020	Dynamo Moscow	1 – 1	Kairat	Belek, Turkey
17:00 MSK (UTC+3)	Igboun 72'; Šunjić (red card) 80'	Report	D.Usanov 57'

14 February 2020	Dynamo Moscow	5 – 0	Spartaks Jūrmala	Belek, Turkey
17:00 MSK (UTC+3)	Rausch 13'; Rykov (red card) 17'; N'Jie 26', 45'; Panchenko 38'; K.Tykavin 83'	Report	A.Adam (red card) 17'

17 February 2020	Dynamo Moscow	1 – 3	Sochi	Belek, Turkey
17:00 MSK (UTC+3)	Szymański 5'	Report	Kokorin 51', 80'; Noboa 55'

18 February 2020	Dynamo Moscow	1 – 1	Minsk	Belek, Turkey
17:00 MSK (UTC+3)	N'Jie 28'	Report	Shramchenko 26'

21 February 2020	Dynamo Moscow	4 – 0	Dinamo Minsk	Belek, Turkey
11:00 MSK (UTC+3)	Szymański 30'; Igboun 44'; N'Jie 75', 79'	Report

== Competitions ==
=== Premier League ===
==== Results by round ====
Round	1	2	3	4	5	6	7	8	9	10	11	12	13	14	15	16	17	18	19	20	21	22	23	24	25	26	27	28	29	30
Ground	A	H	H	A	H	H	A	A	H	H	A	A	H	A	H	A	H	A	A	H	H	A	H	A	H	A	H	A	A	H
Result	D	L	W	D	L	L	W	D	D	L	L	L	D	W	D	W	W	W	L	L	W	W	D	D	L	L	W	W	W	L
Position	7	12	7	10	11	13	11	11	11	11	14	15	15	13	13	11	7	6	8	10	7	6	7	8	8	10	7	6	6	6

Updated to match(es) played on 19 July 2020. Source: See Results
A = Away; H = Home; W = Win; D = Draw; L = Loss

==== Results ====
12 July 2019 1	Arsenal Tula	1–1	Dynamo Moscow	Tula
20:00 MSK (UTC+3)	Grigalava 84'	Report	Cardoso 16' (yellow card) 41'; Pliyev (yellow card) 58'; Yevgenyev (yellow card) 61'	Stadium: Arsenal Stadium; Attendance: 14,742; Referee: Sergey Lapochkin

21 July 2019 2	Dynamo Moscow	0 – 1	Rubin Kazan	Moscow
19:00 MSK (UTC+3)	Panchenko (yellow card) 67'; Kaboré (yellow card) 72'; Szymański (yellow card) 81'	Report	Bashkirov (yellow card) 3' (yellow-red card) 36'; Davitashvili (yellow card) 63'; Stepanov (yellow card) 70'; Dyupin (yellow card) 90'; Kvaratskhelia (yellow card) 90+1'; Mikeltadze 90+3'; Podberyozkin (yellow card) 90+3'	Stadium: VTB Arena; Attendance: 17,315; Referee: Vitali Meshkov

26 July 2019 3	Dynamo Moscow	2 – 0	Ural Yekaterinburg	Moscow
20:00 MSK (UTC+3)	Yusupov 16'; Panchenko 31'; Kaboré (yellow card) 39'; Rykov (yellow card) 59'	Report	Haroyan (yellow card) 56'	Stadium: VTB Arena; Attendance: 12,349; Referee: Pavel Kukuyan

3 August 2019 4	Spartak Moscow	0 – 0	Dynamo Moscow	Moscow
19:00 MSK (UTC+3)	Tashayev (yellow card) 10'; Guliyev (yellow card) 32'; Ponce (red card) 35'; Bakayev (yellow card) 90+4'; Maksimenko (yellow card) 90+5'	Report	Yusupov (yellow card) 57'; Šunjić (yellow card) 85'; N'Jie (yellow card) 89'	Stadium: Otkritie Arena; Attendance: 34,389; Referee: Vladislav Bezborodov

10 August 2019 5	Dynamo Moscow	0 – 2	Zenit St.Petersburg	Moscow
19:00 MSK (UTC+3)	Joãozinho (yellow card) 26'; Panchenko (yellow card) 56'; Rykov (yellow card) 60'; Yusupov (yellow card) 69' (yellow-red card) 80'	Report	Dzyuba 10'; Ozdoyev (yellow card) 35' (goal) 88'; Azmoun (yellow card) 39'; Sutormin (yellow card) 59'	Stadium: VTB Arena; Attendance: 19,095; Referee: Evgeny Turbin

18 August 2019 6	Dynamo Moscow	1 – 2	Lokomotiv Moscow	Moscow
19:00 MSK (UTC+3)	Philipp 3'; Szymański (yellow card) 13'; Šunjić (yellow card) 48'	Report	Barinov (yellow card) 2'; Al.Miranchuk 28' (pen.); Krychowiak (yellow card) 67'; Idowu (yellow card) 68'; An.Miranchuk 82'; Ignatyev (yellow card) 84'; Guilherme (yellow card) 87'	Stadium: VTB Arena; Attendance: 17,837; Referee: Vasili Kazartsev

24 August 2019 7	Tambov	0 – 2	Dynamo Moscow	Saransk
14:00 MSK (UTC+3)	Oyewole (yellow card) 25'; Gogoua (yellow card) 57'	Report	Philipp 41'; Kaboré (yellow card) 43'; Panchenko 80'	Stadium: Mordovia Arena; Attendance: 4,816; Referee: Igor Panin
Note: Match played at the Mordovia Arena in Saransk instead of Tambov's regular Spartak Stadium.

30 August 2019 8	Krylia Sovetov	0 – 0	Dynamo Moscow	Samara
20:00 MSK (UTC+3)	Mijailović (yellow card) 90'; Poluyakhtov (yellow card) 90+5'	Report	Kaboré (yellow card) 27'; Rausch (yellow card) 41'; Philipp (yellow card) 58'	Stadium: Samara Arena; Attendance: 14,728; Referee: vladislav Bezborodov

16 September 2019 9	Dynamo Moscow	0 – 0	Ufa	Moscow
20:00 MSK (UTC+3)	Yevgenyev (yellow card) 77'	Report	Alikin (yellow card) 25'; Sukhov (yellow card) 71'	Stadium: VTB Arena; Attendance: 9,538; Referee: Vitali Meshkov

22 September 2019 10	Dynamo Moscow	2 – 3	Sochi	Moscow
14:00 MSK (UTC+3)	Igboun 50', 63'; Joãozinho (yellow card) 58'	Report	Zabolotny 31' (yellow card) 56'; Mevlja 65'; Lagator (yellow card) 88'; Karapetian 90'	Stadium: VTB Arena; Attendance: 10,119; Referee: Sergey Lapochkin

28 September 2019 11	Rostov	3 – 0	Dynamo Moscow	Rostov-on-Don
16:30 MSK (UTC+3)	Popov 25' (yellow card) 64'; Shomurodov 37'; Bayramyan (yellow card) 54'; Zaynutdinov 82'	Report	Szymański (yellow card) 16'; Pliyev (yellow card) 21' (yellow-red card) 66'; Kaboré (yellow card) 46'; Joãozinho (yellow card) 83'	Stadium: Rostov Arena; Attendance: 29,990; Referee: Evgeny Turbin

5 October 2019 12	Orenburg	2 – 0	Dynamo Moscow	Orenburg
14:00 MSK (UTC+3)	Radaković (yellow card) 36' (goal) 88'; Kulishev 61'	Report	Yusupov (yellow card) 21' (yellow-red card) 42'; Yevgenyev (yellow card) 82'	Stadium: Gazovik Stadium; Attendance: 4,062; Referee: Pavel Kukuyan

20 October 2019 13	Dynamo Moscow	1 – 1	Krasnodar	Moscow
19:00 MSK (UTC+3)	Morozov 3'; Igboun (yellow card) 33'; Rykov (yellow card) 45+1'; Kaboré (yellow card) 54'; Neustädter (yellow card) 72'; Rausch (yellow card) 81'	Report	Spajić (yellow card) 17'; Berg (yellow card) 32'; Martynovich 35'; Suleymanov (yellow card) 87'	Stadium: VTB Arena; Attendance: 15,374; Referee: Mikhail Vilkov

27 October 2019 14	CSKA Moscow	0 – 1	Dynamo Moscow	Moscow
16:30 MSK (UTC+3)	Bijol (yellow card) 9'; Vlašić (penalty missed) 22'	Report	Neustädter (yellow card) 29'; Kaboré (yellow card) 58'; N'Jie 85'; Igboun (yellow card) 88'	Stadium: VEB Arena; Attendance: 20,019; Referee: Sergei Karasev

2 November 2019 15	Dynamo Moscow	1 – 1	Akhmat Grozny	Moscow
14:00 MSK (UTC+3)	Ordets (yellow card) 28' (goal) 90+3'; Panchenko (penalty missed) 31'; Morozov (yellow card) 43'; Kaboré (yellow card) 56' (yellow-red card) 60'; Igboun (yellow card) 90+1'	Report	Ángel (yellow card) 5'; Ponce (yellow card) 9' (goal) 43' (pen.); Musalov (yellow card) 31'; Glushakov (yellow card) 56'; Semyonov (yellow card) 90+1'	Stadium: VTB Arena; Attendance: 10,092; Referee: Sergey Lapochkin

9 November 2019 16	Rubin Kazan	0 – 1	Dynamo Moscow	Kazan
14:00 MSK (UTC+3)	Zuyev (yellow card) 26' (yellow-red card) 45'; Tashayev (yellow card) 51'; Davitashvili (yellow card) 72'	Report	Szymański 23'; N'Jie (yellow card) 30'; Ordets (yellow card) 34' (yellow-red card) 66'; Parshivlyuk (yellow card) 90'	Stadium: Central Stadium; Attendance: 4,757; Referee: Evgeny Turbin

23 November 2019 17	Dynamo Moscow	2 – 1	Rostov	Moscow
16:30 MSK (UTC+3)	Philipp 33' (pen.), 90' (pen.); Szymański (yellow card) 60'; Neustädter (yellow card) 90+5'; Parshivlyuk (yellow card) 90+7'	Report	Hadžikadunić (yellow card) 2'; Popov 13'; Ionov (penalty missed) 90+9	Stadium: VTB Arena; Attendance: 11,569; Referee: Vasili Kazartsev

1 December 2019 18	Lokomotiv Moscow	1 – 2	Dynamo Moscow	Moscow
16:30 MSK (UTC+3)	Al.Miranchuk 38' (pen.); Ignatyev (yellow card) 48'; Krychowiak (yellow card) 75'; Ćorluka (yellow card) 90+3'	Report	Philipp 23', 49' (pen.); Shunin (yellow card) 90+3'	Stadium: RZD Arena; Attendance: 17,739; Referee: Sergei Karasev

6 December 2019 19	Zenit St.Petersburg	3 – 0	Dynamo Moscow	Saint Petersburg
19:30 MSK (UTC+3)	Azmoun 6'; Yerokhin (yellow card) 26'; Ivanović 35'; Dzyuba 45+1'	Report	Szymański (yellow card) 15'; Philipp (yellow card) 22'; Yusupov (yellow card) 41'	Stadium: Krestovsky Stadium; Referee: Nikolay Voloshin

29 February 2020 20	Dynamo Moscow	0 – 2	Spartak Moscow	Moscow
16:30 MSK (UTC+3)	Šunjić (yellow card) 64'; Rykov (yellow card) 67'	Report	Bakayev 29'; Zobnin 62'	Stadium: VTB Arena; Attendance: 24,946; Referee: Sergei Karasev

7 March 2020 21	Dynamo Moscow	1 – 0	Tambov	Moscow
16:30 MSK (UTC+3)	Komlichenko 34'; Rausch (yellow card) 84'	Report	Filin (yellow card) 21'; Gritsayenko (yellow card) 59'; Obukhov (yellow card) 80'; Melkadze (yellow card) 89'	Stadium: VTB Arena; Attendance: 10,143; Referee: Vasili Kazartsev

13 March 2020 22	Akhmat Grozny	2 – 3	Dynamo Moscow	Grozny
19:30 MSK (UTC+3)	Roshi 10' (yellow card) 90+2'; Kharin (yellow card) 31'; Ravanelli (yellow card) 45+2'; Ángel (yellow card) 47'; Utsiyev (yellow card) 50'; Berisha (yellow card) 79'; Glushakov 89'	Report	Rausch 26'; Parshivlyuk (yellow card) 42'; Philipp 50' (pen.); Skopintsev 86'; Komlichenko (yellow card) 90+5'	Stadium: Akhmat-Arena; Attendance: 13,232; Referee: Vitali Meshkov

27 June 2020 24	Dynamo Moscow	0 – 0	CSKA Moscow	Moscow
19:00 MSK (UTC+3)	Panchenko (yellow card) 18'; Rykov (yellow card) 24'	Report	Oblyakov (yellow card) 76'; Bijol (yellow card) 80' (yellow-red card) 90+2'	Stadium: VTB Arena; Referee: Kirill Levnikov
Note: Match originally scheduled for 5 April, but postponed on 17 March due to the COVID-19 pandemic.

1 July 2020 25	Sochi	1 – 1	Dynamo Moscow	Sochi
20:00 MSK (UTC+3)	Tsallagov (yellow card) 36'; Mevlja (yellow card) 56'; Miladinović (yellow card) 56'; Mostovoy (yellow card) 62'; Kokorin 90+2' (pen.)	Report	Šunjić (yellow card) 4' (yellow-red card) 73'; Ordets (yellow card) 45+1'; Komlichenko 57' (pen.) (yellow card) 80'; Morozov (yellow card) 90+1'	Stadium: Fisht Olympic Stadium; Referee: Igor Panin
Note: Match originally scheduled for 11 April, but postponed on 1 April due to the COVID-19 pandemic.

4 July 2020 26	Dynamo Moscow	0 – 1	Arsenal Tula	Moscow
16:30 MSK (UTC+3)	Yusupov (yellow card) 38'; Igboun (yellow card) 50'	Report	Lutsenko 17'; Kombarov (yellow card) 20' (yellow-red card) 35'; Álvarez (yellow card) 28'; Kostadinov (yellow card) 36'; Lesovoy (yellow card) 81'; Khlusevich (yellow card) 84'; Minayev (yellow card) 90'; Shamov (yellow card) 90+3'	Stadium: VTB Arena; Referee: Vladislav Bezborodov
Note: Match originally scheduled for 18 April, but postponed on 1 April due to the COVID-19 pandemic.

9 July 2020 27	Ural Yekaterinburg	2 – 1	Dynamo Moscow	Yekaterinburg
17:00 MSK (UTC+3)	El Kabir 22'; Boumal (yellow card) 51'; Kulakov (yellow card) 89'; Pogrebnyak 90+2' (yellow card) 90+4'	Report	Igboun (yellow card) 29'; Yemelyanov 31' (o.g.); Sosnin (yellow card) 42'; Neustädter (yellow card) 83'	Stadium: Central Stadium; Referee: Vladimir Moskalev
Note: Match originally scheduled for 25 April, but postponed on 1 April due to the COVID-19 pandemic.

12 July 2020 28	Dynamo Moscow	2 – 0	Krylia Sovetov	Moscow
18:30 MSK (UTC+3)	Philipp 15' (pen.); Komlichenko 24' (pen.) (yellow card) 35'; Skopintsev (yellow card) 32'; Rykov (yellow card) 43'; Ordets (yellow card) 71'; Pliyev (red card) 90+2'	Report	Karpov (yellow card) 23'; Radonjić (yellow card) 40'; Lystsov (yellow card) 68'; Kombarov (yellow card) 90+2'; Kiselyov (yellow card) 90+3'	Stadium: VTB Arena; Referee: Sergei Karasev
Note: Match originally scheduled for 3 May, but postponed on 1 April due to the COVID-19 pandemic.

16 July 2020 29	Ufa	0 – 1	Dynamo Moscow	Ufa
18:00 MSK (UTC+3)	Yemelyanov (yellow card) 55'; Alikin (yellow card) 72'	Report	Joãozinho 79' (pen.)	Stadium: Neftyanik Stadium; Referee: Pavel Kukuyan
Note: Match originally scheduled for 11 May, but postponed on 1 April due to the COVID-19 pandemic.

19 July 2020 23	Krasnodar	0 – 2	Dynamo Moscow	Krasnodar
20:30 MSK (UTC+3)	Safonov (red card) 17'; Utkin (yellow card) 29'; Olsson (yellow card) 45'	Report	Grulyov 26'; Morozov (yellow card) 47'; Rykov (yellow card) 66'; Sosnin (yellow card) 83'; Joãozinho 90'	Stadium: Krasnodar Stadium; Referee: Mikhail Vilkov
Note: Match originally scheduled for 22 March, but postponed on 17 March due to the COVID-19 pandemic. Match then scheduled for 21 June, but postponed on the same day due to an outbreak of COVID-19 within the Dynamo Moscow squad.

22 July 2020 30	Dynamo Moscow	0 – 1	Orenburg	Moscow
19:00 MSK (UTC+3)	Philipp (yellow card) 34'; Morozov (yellow card) 90+1'	Report	Ayupov (yellow card) 35'; Fameyeh 29'; Terekhov (yellow card) 38'; Sivakow (yellow card) 39'	Stadium: VTB Arena; Referee: Sergey Lapochkin
Note: Match originally scheduled for 17 May, but postponed on 1 April due to the COVID-19 pandemic.

==== League table ====
Pos	Team	Pld	W	D	L	GF	GA	GD	Pts	Qualification or relegation
4	CSKA Moscow	30	14	8	8	43	29	+14	50	Qualification for the Europa League group stage
5	Rostov	30	12	9	9	45	50	−5	45	Qualification for the Europa League third qualifying round
6	Dynamo Moscow	30	11	8	11	27	30	−3	41	Qualification for the Europa League second qualifying round
7	Spartak Moscow	30	11	6	13	35	33	+2	39	
8	Arsenal Tula	30	11	5	14	37	41	−4	38 (Note: Head-to-head points: Arsenal Tula 4, Ufa 1)	

Source: Russian Premier Liga, Soccerway
Rules for classification: 1) Points; 2) Head-to-head points; 3) Head-to-head matches won; 4) Head-to-head goal difference; 5) Head-to-head goals scored; 6) Matches won; 7) Goal difference; 8) Goals scored; 9) Play-off.

=== Russian Cup ===
25 September 2019 Round of 32	Luch Vladivostok	1 – 0	Dynamo Moscow	Vladivostok
12:00 MSK (UTC+3)	Marushchak 20'; Nasadyuk (yellow card) 23'; Kvekveskiri (yellow card) 70'	Report	Kalinin (yellow card) 51'; Kaboré (yellow card) 82'; Igboun (yellow card) 82'; Sheydayev (yellow card) 82'; Panchenko (yellow card) 82'	Stadium: Dynamo Stadium; Attendance: 6,200; Referee: Anton Anopa

== Squad statistics ==
As of match played 22 July 2020

=== Appearances and goals ===
No.	Pos	Nat	Player	Total		Premier League		Russian Cup	
No.	Pos	Nat	Player	Apps	Goals	Apps	Goals	Apps	Goals
1	GK	(Russia) RUS	Anton Shunin	24	0	23	0	1	0
2	DF	(Russia) RUS	Grigori Morozov	22	1	17+4	1	1	0
3	DF	(Russia) RUS	Zaurbek Pliyev	14	0	10+4	0	0	0
4	DF	(Russia) RUS	Vladimir Rykov	20	0	18+1	0	1	0
5	FW	(Germany) GER	Maximilian Philipp	21	8	15+5	8	1	0
6	MF	(Russia) RUS	Artur Yusupov	21	1	19+2	1	0	0
8	FW	(Russia) RUS	Kirill Panchenko	23	2	12+10	2	0+1	0
9	FW	(Cameroon) CMR	Clinton N'Jie	19	1	7+12	1	0	0
10	FW	(Nigeria) NGR	Sylvester Igboun	21	2	17+3	2	0+1	0
11	MF	(Poland) POL	Sebastian Szymański	23	1	18+4	1	1	0
15	DF	(Russia) RUS	Roman Neustädter	21	0	19+1	0	1	0
17	DF	(Russia) RUS	Sergei Parshivlyuk	17	0	15+2	0	0	0
18	DF	(Ukraine) UKR	Ivan Ordets	18	1	16+1	1	1	0
20	MF	(Russia) RUS	Vyacheslav Grulyov	3	1	2+1	1	0	0
21	MF	(Russia) RUS	Dmitri Skopintsev	10	1	10	1	0	0
22	MF	(Brazil) BRA	Joãozinho	19	2	18+1	2	0	0
23	MF	(Russia) RUS	Anton Sosnin	4	0	1+3	0	0	0
24	DF	(Russia) RUS	Roman Yevgenyev	14	0	11+3	0	0	0
27	FW	(Russia) RUS	Nikolay Komlichenko	11	3	7+4	3	0	0
31	GK	(Russia) RUS	Igor Leshchuk	8	0	7+1	0	0	0
34	DF	(Russia) RUS	Konstantin Rausch	18	1	16+2	1	0	0
44	DF	(Bosnia and Herzegovina) BIH	Toni Šunjić	19	0	17+2	0	0	0
76	MF	(Russia) RUS	Vladislav Karapuzov	5	0	2+3	0	0	0
77	MF	(Burkina Faso) BFA	Charles Kaboré	22	0	15+6	0	0+1	0
85	MF	(Russia) RUS	Igor Shkolik	3	0	1+2	0	0	0
88	MF	(Sweden) SWE	Oscar Hiljemark	15	0	5+9	0	1	0
89	FW	(Russia) RUS	Maksim Danilin	2	0	1+1	0	0	0
Players away from the club on loan:
7	MF	(Portugal) POR	Miguel Cardoso	6	1	3+3	1	0	0
13	DF	(Ukraine) UKR	Ihor Kalinin	1	0	0	0	1	0
20	MF	(Russia) RUS	Vyacheslav Grulyov	11	0	2+8	0	1	0
Players who appeared for Dynamo Moscow but left during the season:
5	MF	(Ghana) GHA	Abdul Aziz Tetteh	3	0	1+2	0	0	0
27	MF	(Mali) MLI	Samba Sow	1	0	0+1	0	0	0
99	FW	(Azerbaijan) AZE	Ramil Sheydayev	9	0	5+3	0	1	0

=== Goal scorers ===
Place	Position	Nation	Number	Name	Premier League	Russian Cup	Total
1	FW	(Germany)	5	Maximilian Philipp	8	0	8
2	FW	(Russia)	27	Nikolay Komlichenko	3	0	3
3	FW	(Russia)	8	Kirill Panchenko	2	0	2
3	FW	(Nigeria)	10	Sylvester Igboun	2	0	2
3	MF	(Brazil)	22	Joãozinho	1	0	1
6	MF	(Portugal)	7	Miguel Cardoso	1	0	1
6	MF	(Russia)	6	Artur Yusupov	1	0	1
6	DF	(Russia)	2	Grigori Morozov	1	0	1
6	FW	(Cameroon)	9	Clinton N'Jie	1	0	1
6	DF	(Ukraine)	18	Ivan Ordets	1	0	1
6	MF	(Poland)	11	Sebastian Szymański	1	0	1
6	DF	(Russia)	34	Konstantin Rausch	1	0	1
6	MF	(Russia)	21	Dmitri Skopintsev	1	0	1
6	MF	(Russia)	20	Vyacheslav Grulyov	1	0	1
6				Own goal	1	0	1
Total					27	0	27

=== Clean sheets ===
Place	Position	Nation	Number	Name	Premier League	Russian Cup	Total
1	GK	(Russia)	1	Anton Shunin	9	0	9
2	GK	(Russia)	31	Igor Leshchuk	3	0	3
Total					12	0	12

=== Disciplinary record ===
Number	Nation	Position	Name	Premier League		Russian Cup		Total	
Number	Nation	Position	Name	Yellow card	Red card	Yellow card	Red card	Yellow card	Red card
1	(Russia)	GK	Anton Shunin	1	0	0	0	1	0
2	(Russia)	DF	Grigori Morozov	4	0	0	0	4	0
3	(Russia)	DF	Zaurbek Pliyev	3	2	0	0	3	2
4	(Russia)	DF	Vladimir Rykov	7	0	0	0	7	0
5	(Germany)	FW	Maximilian Philipp	3	0	0	0	3	0
6	(Russia)	MF	Artur Yusupov	7	2	0	0	7	2
8	(Russia)	FW	Kirill Panchenko	3	0	1	0	4	0
9	(Cameroon)	FW	Clinton N'Jie	2	0	0	0	2	0
10	(Nigeria)	FW	Sylvester Igboun	5	0	1	0	6	0
11	(Poland)	MF	Sebastian Szymański	5	0	0	0	5	0
15	(Russia)	DF	Roman Neustädter	4	0	0	0	4	0
17	(Russia)	DF	Sergei Parshivlyuk	1	0	1	0	2	0
18	(Ukraine)	DF	Ivan Ordets	5	1	0	0	5	1
21	(Russia)	MF	Dmitri Skopintsev	1	0	0	0	1	0
22	(Brazil)	MF	Joãozinho	3	0	0	0	3	0
23	(Russia)	MF	Anton Sosnin	2	0	0	0	2	0
24	(Russia)	DF	Roman Yevgenyev	3	0	0	0	3	0
27	(Russia)	FW	Nikolay Komlichenko	3	0	0	0	3	0
34	(Russia)	DF	Konstantin Rausch	3	0	0	0	3	0
44	(Bosnia and Herzegovina)	DF	Toni Šunjić	5	1	0	0	5	1
77	(Burkina Faso)	MF	Charles Kaboré	9	1	1	0	10	1
Players away on loan:
7	(Portugal)	MF	Miguel Cardoso	1	0	0	0	1	0
13	(Ukraine)	DF	Ihor Kalinin	0	0	1	0	1	0
Players who left Dynamo Moscow during the season:
99	(Azerbaijan)	FW	Ramil Sheydayev	1	0	1	0	2	0
Total				82	7	5	0	87	7
