= Aleksandr Kutitsky =

Russian footballer

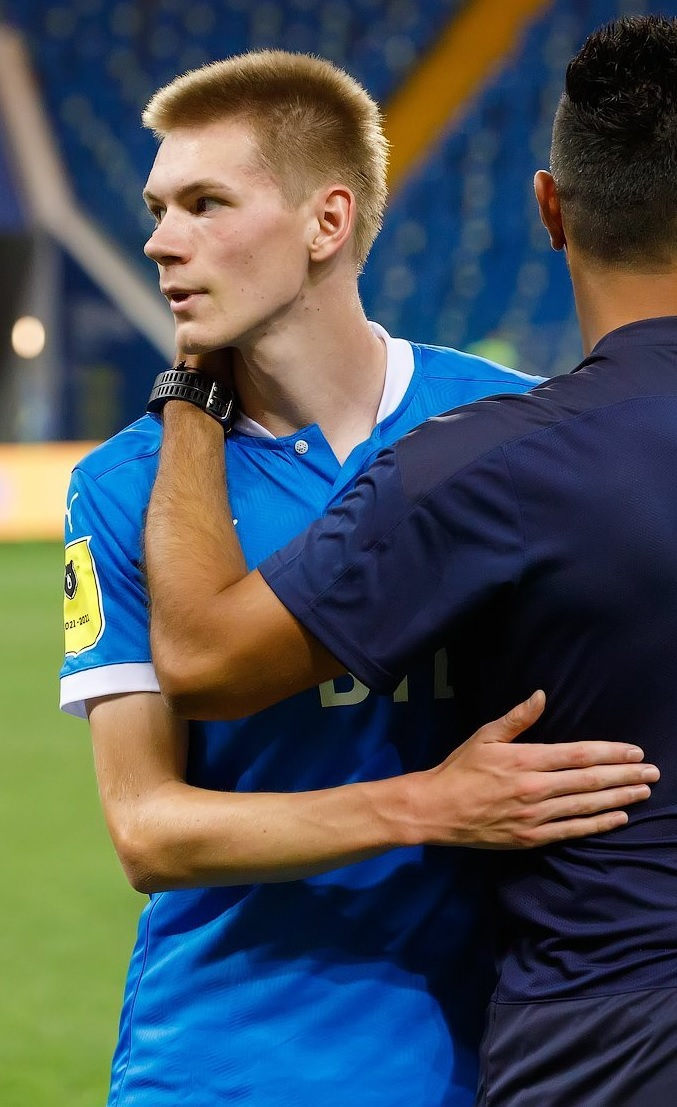
- Kutitsky with Dynamo Moscow in 2021

Personal information
- Full name: Aleksandr Olegovich Kutitsky
- Date of birth: 1 January 2002 (age 24)
- Place of birth: Moscow, Russia
- Height: 1.84 m (6 ft 0 in)
- Position: Defensive midfielder

Team information
- Current team: Dynamo Moscow
- Number: 50

Youth career
- 2010–2020: Dynamo Moscow

Senior career*
Years	Team	Apps	(Gls)
2020–2024	Dynamo-2 Moscow	24	(1)
2020–	Dynamo Moscow	69	(1)

International career^{‡}
2022	Russia U21	3	(0)
- * Club domestic league appearances and goals as of 8 March 2026 ‡ National team caps and goals as of 16 November 2022

Aleksandr Olegovich Kutitsky (Russian: Александр Олегович Кутицкий; born 1 January 2002) is a Russian football player who plays for FC Dynamo Moscow. His primary position is defensive midfielder, and he also plays as a centre-back.

== Club career ==
Kutitsky was first included in the senior squad of FC Dynamo Moscow in November 2020 and subsequently joined them for their January 2021 training camp.

He made his debut for FC Dynamo Moscow on 20 February 2021 in a Russian Cup game against FC Spartak Moscow. He substituted Sergei Parshivlyuk in the 82nd minute of a 2–0 home victory.

Kutitsky made his Russian Premier League debut for Dynamo on 23 July 2021 in a game against FC Rostov, he substituted Nikola Moro in the 75th minute.

On 15 December 2022, Kutitsky extended his contract with Dynamo until 2026.

On 4 April 2025, Kutitsky's contract with Dynamo was extended to June 2029.

== Career statistics ==
As of match played 14 October 2026

Appearances and goals by club, season and competition
Club	Season	League			Cup		Total	
Club	Season	Division	Apps	Goals	Apps	Goals	Apps	Goals
FC Dynamo-2 Moscow	2020–21	Russian Second League	16	1	—		16	1
FC Dynamo-2 Moscow	2021–22	Russian Second League	7	0	—		7	0
FC Dynamo-2 Moscow	2023	Russian Second League B	1	0	—		1	0
FC Dynamo-2 Moscow	Total		24	1	—		24	1
FC Dynamo Moscow	2020–21	Russian Premier League	0	0	1	0	1	0
FC Dynamo Moscow	2021–22	Russian Premier League	7	0	2	0	9	0
FC Dynamo Moscow	2022–23	Russian Premier League	22	0	7	1	29	1
FC Dynamo Moscow	2023–24	Russian Premier League	4	0	6	0	10	0
FC Dynamo Moscow	2024–25	Russian Premier League	24	1	6	0	30	1
FC Dynamo Moscow	2025–26	Russian Premier League	12	0	7	0	19	0
FC Dynamo Moscow	2026–27	Russian Premier League	0	0	1	0	1	0
FC Dynamo Moscow	Total		69	1	30	1	99	2
Career total			93	2	30	1	123	3
