= Roman Yevgenyev =

Russian footballer

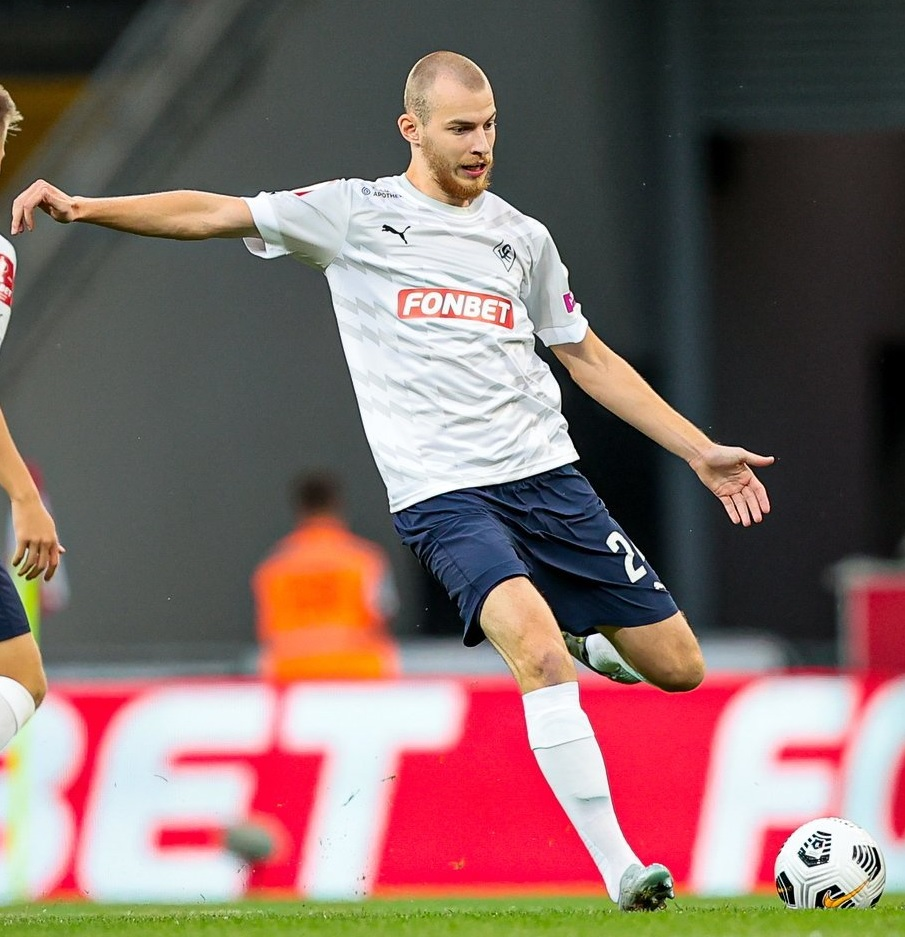
- Yevgenyev with Krylia Sovetov in 2022

Personal information
- Full name: Roman Alekseyevich Yevgenyev
- Date of birth: 23 February 1999 (age 27)
- Place of birth: Spasskoye, Primorsky Krai, Russia
- Height: 1.93 m (6 ft 4 in)
- Position: Centre back

Team information
- Current team: Nizhny Novgorod
- Number: 4

Youth career
- 2007–2010: Sokol Moscow
- 2010–2013: Spartak Moscow
- 2013–2018: Dynamo Moscow

Senior career*
Years	Team	Apps	(Gls)
2017	Dynamo-2 Moscow	7	(0)
2018–2022	Dynamo Moscow	77	(1)
2022–2026	Krylia Sovetov Samara	80	(1)
2026–	Nizhny Novgorod	0	(0)

International career^{‡}
2016–2017	Russia U18	16	(0)
2017	Russia U19	6	(0)
2018	Russia U20	3	(0)
2019–2021	Russia U21	15	(1)
2020–	Russia	2	(0)
- * Club domestic league appearances and goals as of 21 April 2026 ‡ National team caps and goals as of 16 October 2023

Roman Alekseyevich Yevgenyev (Russian: Роман Алексеевич Евгеньев; born 23 February 1999) is a Russian football player who plays as a center back for Nizhny Novgorod. A former Russian youth international, Yevgenyev was included in the senior squad by Russia at UEFA Euro 2020.

== Club career ==
He made his debut in the Russian Professional Football League for FC Dynamo-2 Moscow on 2 April 2017 in a game against FC Dynamo Saint Petersburg.

He made his Russian Premier League debut for FC Dynamo Moscow on 6 October 2018 in a game against FC Krylia Sovetov Samara.

On 24 June 2019, he signed a new 3-year contract with Dynamo.

On 8 November 2020, he started the game against FC Lokomotiv Moscow as Dynamo's captain for the first time (as regular captain Anton Shunin missed the game) and scored his first Dynamo goal in the 3rd minute of the game as Dynamo won 5–1. Yevgenyev formed a partnership in central defense with Ivan Ordets, and made a career-high 27 appearances during the season. His performances earned him an inclusion in Russia's provisional Euro 2020 squad.

Entering the 2021–22 season, Dynamo signed Fabián Balbuena from West Ham, and this pushed Yevgenyev out of the starting line-up. His first start of the season came on 12 September, after Balbuena had played international football with Paraguay just three days prior. He did not appear again until 16 October, when Balbuena once again was coming back from the national team duty. By the winter break of the season, he appeared in 8 out of 18 league games, with only two starts. He started (and scored one goal) in two Russian Cup games Dynamo played up to that point. Following the beginning of the 2022 Russian invasion of Ukraine, Ukrainian defender Ivan Ordets stopped appearing for Dynamo, and Yevgenyev returned to the starting lineup for the remainder of the season to replace him.

Yevgenyev left Dynamo as his contract expired in June 2022.

On 15 July 2022, Yevgenyev signed a two-year contract with Krylia Sovetov Samara. On 27 January 2023, he extended his contract with Krylia Sovetov until the end of the 2025–26 season. On 24 June 2026, his contract with Krylia Sovetov was terminated by mutual consent.

On the same day, Yevgenyev signed a two-season contract with Nizhny Novgorod.

== International career ==
In November 2020, he was called up to the Russia national football team for the first time for the games against Moldova, Turkey and Serbia. He made his debut on 18 November 2020 in a Nations League game against Serbia.

On 11 May 2021, he was included in the preliminary extended 30-man squad for UEFA Euro 2020. He was not included in the final squad. On 11 June 2021, he was added to the squad, replacing Andrei Mostovoy who tested positive for COVID-19. He did not appear in any games as Russia was eliminated at group stage.

== Career statistics ==
=== Club ===
As of match played 21 April 2026

Appearances and goals by club, season and competition
Club	Season	League			Russian Cup		Europe		Total	
Club	Season	Division	Apps	Goals	Apps	Goals	Apps	Goals	Apps	Goals
Dynamo-2 Moscow	2016–17	Russian Second League	7	0	—		—		7	0
Dynamo Moscow	2018–19	Russian Premier League	18	0	1	0	—		19	0
Dynamo Moscow	2019–20	Russian Premier League	14	0	0	0	—		14	0
Dynamo Moscow	2020–21	Russian Premier League	27	1	1	0	1 (Note: Appearances in the UEFA Europa League)	0	29	1
Dynamo Moscow	2021–22	Russian Premier League	18	0	6	1	—		24	1
Dynamo Moscow	Total		77	1	8	1	1	0	86	2
Krylia Sovetov Samara	2022–23	Russian Premier League	29	1	8	0	—		37	1
Krylia Sovetov Samara	2023–24	Russian Premier League	23	0	4	0	—		27	0
Krylia Sovetov Samara	2024–25	Russian Premier League	19	0	4	0	—		23	0
Krylia Sovetov Samara	2025–26	Russian Premier League	9	0	5	1	—		14	1
Krylia Sovetov Samara	Total		80	1	21	1	—		101	2
Career total			164	2	29	2	1	0	194	4

=== International ===
As of match played 16 October 2023

Appearances and goals by national team and year
National team	Year	Apps	Goals
Russia	2020	1	0
Russia	2023	1	0
Total		2	0
