= Vyacheslav Grulyov =

Russian footballer

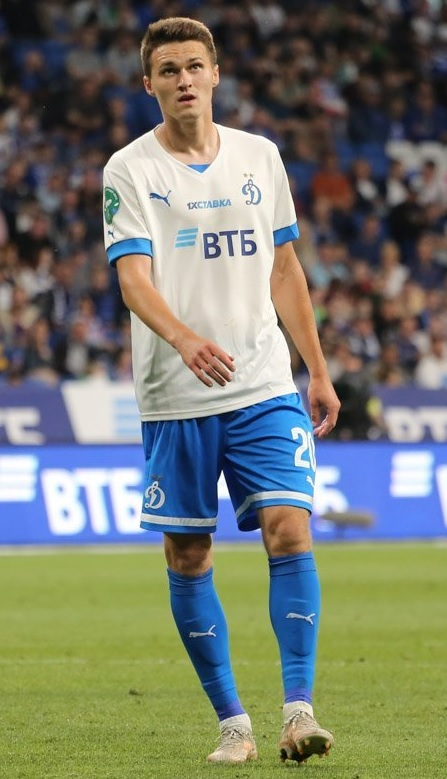
- Grulyov with Dynamo Moscow in 2022

Personal information
- Full name: Vyacheslav Dmitriyevich Grulyov
- Date of birth: 23 March 1999 (age 27)
- Place of birth: Kemerovo, Russia
- Height: 1.90 m (6 ft 3 in)
- Position: Forward

Team information
- Current team: Pari Nizhny Novgorod
- Number: 27

Youth career
- –2012: SDYuSShOR Kemerovo
- 2012–2013: Konoplyov football academy
- 2013–2019: Dynamo Moscow

Senior career*
Years	Team	Apps	(Gls)
2016–2021	Dynamo-2 Moscow	22	(3)
2018–2025	Dynamo Moscow	126	(19)
2020	→ Nizhny Novgorod (loan)	2	(0)
2025–	Nizhny Novgorod	33	(7)

International career^{‡}
2015	Russia U16	6	(3)
2015–2016	Russia U17	16	(9)
2016–2017	Russia U18	10	(1)
2017	Russia U19	1	(0)
2018	Russia U20	2	(0)
2019–2021	Russia U21	14	(3)
- * Club domestic league appearances and goals as of 17 May 2026 ‡ National team caps and goals as of 31 March 2021

Vyacheslav Dmitriyevich Grulyov (Russian: Вячеслав Дмитриевич Грулёв; born 23 March 1999) is a Russian football player who plays as a forward for Pari Nizhny Novgorod. His primary position is a striker and he is also deployed as a left winger.

== Club career ==
He made his debut in the Russian Professional Football League for Dynamo-2 Moscow on 20 July 2016 in a game against Tekstilshchik Ivanovo.

He made his Russian Premier League debut for Dynamo Moscow on 4 March 2018 in a game against Ufa. On 30 November 2018, he scored his first Premier League goal for Dynamo, a late equalizer in a 1–1 away draw against Rubin Kazan. On 3 March 2019, he scored his second goal which gave Dynamo a 2–1 away victory over Ufa in the added time.

On 10 January 2020, he joined Nizhny Novgorod on loan until the end of the season.

On 16 May 2021, the closing day of the 2020–21 season, he scored twice after coming on as a second-half substitute in a 3–2 victory over CSKA Moscow.

On 22 December 2021, he extended his Dynamo contract to 2025.

On 10 January 2025, Grulyov signed a 2.5-year contract with Nizhny Novgorod.

== Career statistics ==
As of match played 17 May 2026

Appearances and goals by club, season and competition
Club	Season	League			Russian Cup		Europe		Other		Total	
Club	Season	Division	Apps	Goals	Apps	Goals	Apps	Goals	Apps	Goals	Apps	Goals
Dynamo-2 Moscow	2016–17	Russian Second League	19	3	—		—		—		19	3
Dynamo-2 Moscow	2020–21	Russian Second League	3	0	—		—		—		3	0
Dynamo-2 Moscow	Total		22	3	—		—		—		22	3
Dynamo Moscow	2017–18	Russian Premier League	2	0	0	0	0	0	—		2	0
Dynamo Moscow	2018–19	Russian Premier League	11	2	1	0	0	0	—		12	2
Dynamo Moscow	2019–20	Russian Premier League	13	1	1	0	—		—		14	1
Dynamo Moscow	2020–21	Russian Premier League	25	4	2	0	—		—		27	4
Dynamo Moscow	2021–22	Russian Premier League	26	7	4	1	—		—		30	8
Dynamo Moscow	2022–23	Russian Premier League	26	3	8	2	—		—		34	5
Dynamo Moscow	2023–24	Russian Premier League	18	1	9	3	—		—		27	4
Dynamo Moscow	2024–25	Russian Premier League	5	1	3	0	—		—		8	1
Dynamo Moscow	Total		126	19	28	6	0	0	—		154	25
Nizhny Novgorod (loan)	2019–20	Russian First League	2	0	—		—		—		2	0
Pari Nizhny Novgorod	2024–25	Russian Premier League	12	4	—		—		2 (Note: Appearances in relegation play-offs)	0	14	4
Pari Nizhny Novgorod	2025–26	Russian Premier League	21	3	6	0	—		—		27	3
Pari Nizhny Novgorod	Total		33	7	6	0	0	0	2	0	41	7
Career total			183	29	34	6	0	0	2	0	219	35
