= Vladislav Galkin (footballer) =

Russian football player

Personal information
- Full name: Vladislav Ivanovich Galkin
- Date of birth: 3 April 2002 (age 24)
- Place of birth: Krasnogorsk, Russia
- Height: 1.79 m (5 ft 10 in)
- Positions: Right midfielder; left midfielder

Team information
- Current team: Veles Moscow
- Number: 90

Youth career
- 2008–2016: Zorky Krasnogorsk
- 2016–2020: Dynamo Moscow

Senior career*
Years	Team	Apps	(Gls)
2020–2024	Dynamo Moscow	1	(0)
2020–2021	→ Dynamo-2 Moscow	32	(12)
2022	→ RFS (loan)	9	(2)
2022	→ RFS-2 (loan)	6	(0)
2022–2023	→ Dynamo-2 Moscow	20	(4)
2023–2024	→ Akron Tolyatti (loan)	27	(2)
2024–2025	Torpedo Moscow	21	(2)
2025–	Veles Moscow	21	(3)

International career^{‡}
2017	Russia U-15	4	(0)
2018	Russia U-17	2	(0)
- * Club domestic league appearances and goals as of 13 June 2026 ‡ National team caps and goals as of 21 August 2018

Vladislav Ivanovich Galkin (Russian: Владислав Иванович Галкин; born 3 April 2002) is a Russian football player who plays as a right midfielder or left midfielder for Veles Moscow.

== Club career ==
He made his debut for the main team of Dynamo Moscow on 22 September 2021 in a Russian Cup game against Dynamo Stavropol. He made his Russian Premier League debut for Dynamo on 21 November 2021 in a game against Arsenal Tula.

On 15 February 2022, Galkin extended his contract with Dynamo until the end of the 2023–24 season and was loaned to RFS in Latvia until 30 November 2022.

On 6 June 2024, Galkin signed with Torpedo Moscow.

== Career statistics ==
=== Club ===
As of 24 May 2025

Club	Season	League			Cup		Continental		Other		Total	
Club	Season	Division	Apps	Goals	Apps	Goals	Apps	Goals	Apps	Goals	Apps	Goals
Dynamo-2 Moscow	2020–21	Russian Second League	23	8	–		–		–		23	8
Dynamo-2 Moscow	2021–22	Russian Second League	9	4	–		–		–		9	4
Dynamo-2 Moscow	2022–23	Russian Second League	20	4	–		–		–		20	4
Dynamo-2 Moscow	Total		52	16	0	0	0	0	0	0	52	16
Dynamo Moscow	2021–22	Russian Premier League	1	0	1	0	–		–		2	0
RFS (loan)	2022	Latvian Higher League	9	2	0	0	–		–		9	2
RFS-2 (loan)	2022	Latvian First League	6	0	–		–		–		6	0
Akron Tolyatti (loan)	2023–24	Russian First League	27	2	3	0	–		0	0	30	2
Torpedo Moscow	2024–25	Russian First League	21	2	2	0	–		–		23	2
Career total			116	22	6	0	0	0	0	0	122	22
