= Arsen Zakharyan =

Russian footballer (born 2003)

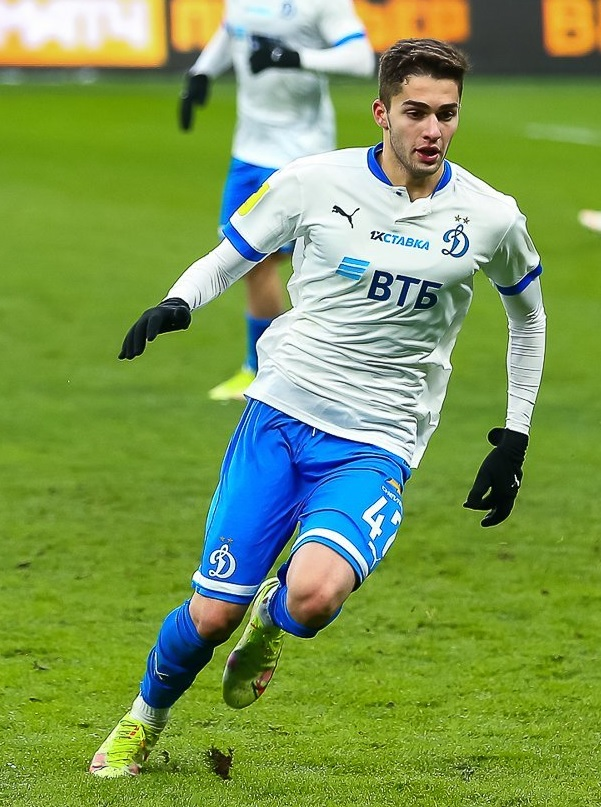
- Zakharyan with Dynamo Moscow in 2021

Personal information
- Full name: Arsen Norayrovich Zakharyan
- Date of birth: 26 May 2003 (age 23)
- Place of birth: Samara, Russia
- Height: 1.83 m (6 ft 0 in)
- Position: Attacking midfielder

Team information
- Current team: Real Sociedad
- Number: 21

Youth career
- 2008–2016: Krylia Sovetov Samara
- 2016–2017: Konoplyov football academy
- 2017–2020: Dynamo Moscow

Senior career*
| Years | Team | Apps | (Gls) |
| 2020 | Dynamo-2 Moscow | 15 | (8) |
| 2020–2023 | Dynamo Moscow | 72 | (15) |
| 2023– | Real Sociedad | 54 | (3) |

International career^{‡}
| 2018 | Russia U15 | 7 | (1) |
| 2018–2019 | Russia U16 | 10 | (3) |
| 2019–2020 | Russia U17 | 7 | (1) |
| 2021–2024 | Russia U21 | 3 | (1) |
| 2021– | Russia | 8 | (0) |
- * Club domestic league appearances and goals as of 25 October 2026 ‡ National team caps and goals as of 21 March 2024

Arsen Norayrovich Zakharyan (Russian: Арсен Норайрович Захарян; Armenian: Արսեն Նորայրի Զախարյան; born 26 May 2003) is a Russian professional footballer who plays as an attacking midfielder for La Liga club Real Sociedad and the Russia national team.

== Early life ==
Zakharyan was born in Samara, Russia into an ethnic Armenian family. Arsen's parents moved from Martakert, Nagorno-Karabakh to Russia after the First Karabakh War (1992–1994).

== Club career ==
=== Dynamo Moscow ===
==== 2020–21 season ====
Zakharyan made his debut in the Russian Premier League for Dynamo Moscow on 1 November 2020, in a game against FC Tambov during the 2020–21 season. He made his first starting lineup appearance for Dynamo in the first league game after the winter break, on 28 February 2021, scoring his first goal in a 2–1 away win against FC Akhmat Grozny. He became the third-youngest Dynamo player to score a goal in the Russian Premier League, after Aleksandr Kokorin and Pyotr Nemov.

Zakharyan was nominated player of the month for February, March and May 2021 by Dynamo fans based on his performances, including a late winner against CSKA Moscow in May. He was voted as player of the 2020–21 season by Dynamo fans, and the Russian Football Union (RFS) nominated him best under-21 player of the season.

==== 2021–22 season ====
Zaharyan's first goal of the 2021–22 season came on 23 July 2021, opening the score in a 2–0 away victory over FC Rostov; he was also selected as player of the game. On 9 December 2021, the Russian Premier League awarded him as the league's best under-21 player of 2021.

Zakharyan was voted player of the season by Dynamo fans for the second season in a row. He also finished second in the vote for the best under-21 player of the league season, losing out to league's top scorer Gamid Agalarov. The RFS also named him best young player and the best left midfielder of the 2021–22 season.

==== 2022–23 season ====
On 1 September 2022, Dynamo announced that the club received an offer for Zakharyan's transfer from Premier League club Chelsea on 25 August 2022 and the clubs were negotiating since, but the transfer would not be possible in the summer 2022 transfer window "for a number of technical reasons beyond our control". Dynamo's bank and former owner VTB Bank was sanctioned by the government of Great Britain in February 2022 following the 2022 Russian invasion of Ukraine. He was voted player of the month by Dynamo fans for September 2022 and October 2022.

==== 2023–24 season ====
Zakharyan started the season with Dynamo among heavy speculation about his potential transfer to a European club. Russian press reported interest from Lazio, Feyenoord, Strasbourg, Genoa, PSV Eindhoven and Ajax. On 9 August 2023, Zakharyan scored a winning goal from a free-kick deep in added time to give Dynamo 4–3 victory over FC Krasnodar in a Russian Cup game. For the next league game against Baltika Kaliningrad on 13 August, Zakharyan was not included in the matchday squad and watched the game from the stands. Dynamo president Pavel Pivovarov announced that the transfer terms between Dynamo and Spanish club Real Sociedad as well as the personal contract terms have been agreed on, and the transfer would become official upon the medical examination.

=== Real Sociedad ===
On 19 August 2023, La Liga club Real Sociedad announced the signing of Zakharyan on a contract until 30 June 2029. The transfer fee was €12 million, with Dynamo retaining 10% of any future transfer fee. On 15 March 2024, Zakharyan scored his first goal for the club in a 2–0 league win over Cádiz. He played 40 games across all competitions in his first season, totalling over 1,800 minutes on the pitch.

During pre-season in July 2024, Zakharyan suffered a right ankle tendon injury and did not return to the pitch until 2 February, 253 days after his last match. Three weeks later, he scored the first goal of a 3–0 home win over Leganés, but left the game with a right-leg muscular injury at half time. In March, he missed Real Sociedad's trip to Manchester United in the last 16 of the Europa League, having not been granted a visa to enter the United Kingdom.

Zakharyan started the 2025–26 season on the bench, making 4 second-half substitute appearances in the first 10 league games. On 28 October 2025, he scored his first goal of the season in the club's Copa del Rey campaign opener against the sixth-tier club Negreira. He made his first starting line-up La Liga appearance in the club's 13th league game against Osasuna on 22 November 2025, but overall continued to be used as second-half substitute in league games, while being a starter in Copa del Rey matches. After missing several games in January and February due to recurring calf injury, he struggled to regain his place in the rotation. Out of the last 20 league games, he started 2 and was a substitute in 3. Real Sociedad won the 2025–26 Copa del Rey, giving Zakharyan his first career trophy (Zakharyan did not appear in any Copa games after the Round of 16 against Osasuna on 13 January 2026, in which he missed the goal on the decisive penalty kick in the shoot-out which would have won the game for his side, they won the shootout after Osasuna missed their next kick).

== International career ==
=== Youth ===
On 15 March 2021, Zakharyan was selected for Russia U21's squad for the 2021 UEFA European Under-21 Championship. He had previously represented Russia up to the under-17s and became the youngest player on Russia's squad. In his debut on 25 March 2021, in the opening game against Iceland, Zakharyan was fouled in the penalty box in the 31st minute, and Russia opened scoring from the penalty kick. In the added time of the first half he scored his first goal to make the score 3–0, with the game eventually ending with a 4–1 victory for Russia. Zakharyan became the youngest goalscorer for Russia U21, and the youngest goalscorer in the history of the UEFA European Under-21 Championship, overtaking Yari Verschaeren.

=== Senior ===
On 11 May 2021, Zakharyan received his first call-up to the senior Russia team, and was included in the preliminary extended 30-man squad for UEFA Euro 2020. He suffered a tonsillitis infection in camp and was not included in the final squad.

Zakharyan made his debut for the senior squad on 1 September 2021, in a 2022 World Cup qualifier against Croatia. He started the game and was substituted in the second half, as the game ended in a 0–0 draw. He became the youngest outfield player in Russian national team history, aged 18 years, 3 months and 6 days, overtaking Alan Dzagoev. Zakharyan also became the second-youngest national team player overall, behind goalkeeper Igor Akinfeev. Both his and Akinfeev's records were beaten by Sergei Pinyayev in 2022.

== Style of play ==
Zakharyan is a versatile player and is deployed in multiple offensive positions, as a wide midfielder on either flank, attacking midfielder or central midfielder. In some games he switches positions throughout the game as the tactics demand. His characteristics, such as his finishing, passing ability and playing style, have led Zakharyan to be compared with Belgian international Kevin De Bruyne.

In October 2020, he was chosen as one of the 60 of the best young talents in world football among the players born in 2003 by The Guardian.

== Career statistics ==
=== Club ===
As of match played 25 October 2026

Appearances and goals by club, season and competition
| Club | Season | League | | | National cup (Note: Includes Russian Cup, Copa del Rey) | | Europe | | Other | | Total | |
| Club | Season | Division | Apps | Goals | Apps | Goals | Apps | Goals | Apps | Goals | Apps | Goals |
|---|---|---|---|---|---|---|---|---|---|---|---|---|
| Dynamo-2 Moscow | 2020–21 | Russian Second League | 15 | 8 | — | | — | | — | | 15 | 8 |
| Dynamo Moscow | 2020–21 | Russian Premier League | 13 | 3 | 0 | 0 | 0 | 0 | — | | 13 | 3 |
| Dynamo Moscow | 2021–22 | Russian Premier League | 29 | 7 | 5 | 2 | — | | — | | 34 | 9 |
| Dynamo Moscow | 2022–23 | Russian Premier League | 27 | 4 | 10 | 1 | — | | — | | 37 | 5 |
| Dynamo Moscow | 2023–24 | Russian Premier League | 3 | 1 | 2 | 1 | — | | — | | 5 | 2 |
| Dynamo Moscow | Total | | 72 | 15 | 17 | 4 | 0 | 0 | — | | 89 | 19 |
| Real Sociedad | 2023–24 | La Liga | 29 | 1 | 6 | 0 | 5 (Note: Appearances in UEFA Champions League) | 0 | — | | 40 | 1 |
| Real Sociedad | 2024–25 | La Liga | 3 | 1 | 0 | 0 | 1 (Note: Appearance(s) in UEFA Europa League) | 0 | — | | 4 | 1 |
| Real Sociedad | 2025–26 | La Liga | 17 | 0 | 4 | 1 | — | | — | | 21 | 1 |
| Real Sociedad | 2026–27 | La Liga | 5 | 1 | 0 | 0 | 2 | 1 | 0 | 0 | 7 | 2 |
| Real Sociedad | Total | | 54 | 3 | 10 | 1 | 8 | 1 | 0 | 0 | 72 | 5 |
| Career total | | | 141 | 26 | 27 | 5 | 8 | 1 | 0 | 0 | 176 | 32 |

=== International ===
As of match played 21 March 2024

Appearances and goals by national team and year
| National team | Year | Apps | Goals |
|---|---|---|---|
| Russia | 2021 | 4 | 0 |
| Russia | 2022 | 2 | 0 |
| Russia | 2023 | 1 | 0 |
| Russia | 2024 | 1 | 0 |
| Total | | 8 | 0 |

== Honours ==
Real Sociedad

- Copa del Rey: 2025–26

Individual

- Dynamo Moscow Best Player of the Season : 2020–21, 2021–22
- RFS Best Young Player of the Season: 2021–22
- Russian Premier League Left Winger of the Season: 2021–22
