= Vladislav Karapuzov =

Russian footballer (born 2000)

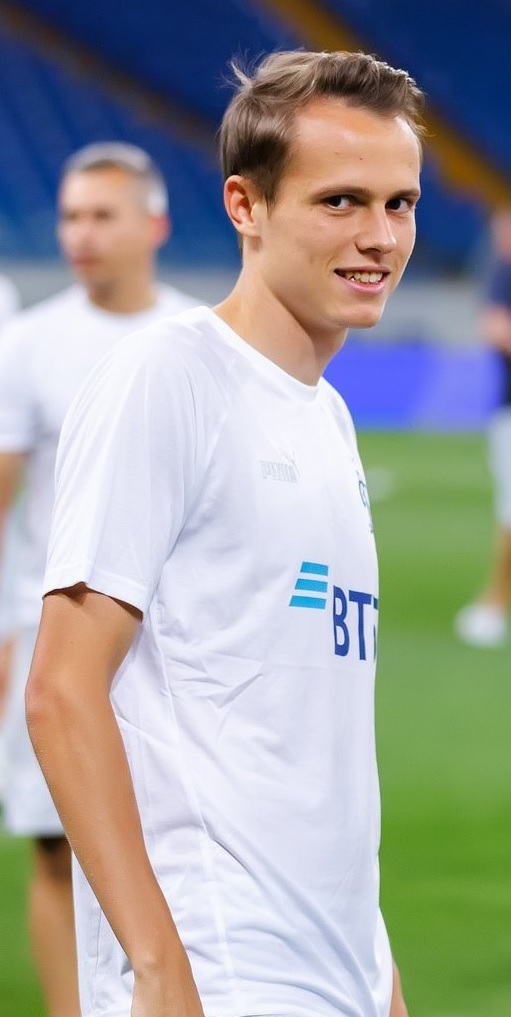
- Karapuzov with Dynamo Moscow in 2022

Personal information
- Full name: Vladislav Aleksandrovich Karapuzov
- Date of birth: 6 January 2000 (age 26)
- Place of birth: Norilsk, Russia
- Height: 1.80 m (5 ft 11 in)
- Position: Right winger

Team information
- Current team: Ural Yekaterinburg (on loan from Nizhny Novgorod)

Youth career
- 2005–2019: Lokomotiv Moscow
- 2019–2020: Dynamo Moscow

Senior career*
| Years | Team | Apps | (Gls) |
| 2018–2019 | Kazanka Moscow | 14 | (1) |
| 2019–2024 | Dynamo Moscow | 15 | (0) |
| 2020 | → Dynamo-2 Moscow | 8 | (1) |
| 2021 | → Tambov (loan) | 10 | (0) |
| 2021–2022 | → Akhmat Grozny (loan) | 29 | (1) |
| 2022–2023 | → Akhmat Grozny (loan) | 18 | (2) |
| 2023–2024 | → Pari NN (loan) | 22 | (0) |
| 2024– | Nizhny Novgorod | 17 | (0) |
| 2025– | → Ural Yekaterinburg (loan) | 17 | (0) |

International career^{‡}
| 2015–2016 | Russia U16 | 6 | (1) |
| 2016–2017 | Russia U17 | 19 | (1) |
| 2017–2018 | Russia U18 | 6 | (1) |
| 2018–2019 | Russia U19 | 8 | (2) |
| 2021 | Russia U21 | 5 | (0) |
- * Club domestic league appearances and goals as of 16 May 2026 ‡ National team caps and goals as of 8 October 2021

Vladislav Aleksandrovich Karapuzov (Russian: Владислав Александрович Карапузов; born 6 January 2000) is a Russian football player who plays as a right winger for Ural Yekaterinburg on loan from Nizhny Novgorod.

== Club career ==
He played in the 2018–19 UEFA Youth League with Lokomotiv Moscow.

After his contract with Lokomotiv Moscow expired in the summer of 2019, he was close to signing with Valencia, but the contract offer fell through. He signed with Dynamo Moscow on 27 August 2019.

He made his debut in the Russian Premier League for Dynamo Moscow on 27 June 2020 in a game against CSKA Moscow, as a starter.

On 21 February 2021, he joined Tambov on loan until the end of the 2020–21 season. On 24 July 2021, he moved on loan to Akhmat Grozny for the 2021–22 season.

On 8 August 2022, Karapuzov extended his contract with Dynamo to 2025. On 8 September 2022, Karapuzov returned to Akhmat Grozny on a new loan until the end of the 2022–23 season.

In August 2023, he joined Pari NN on a season-long loan deal with the option to buy. On 14 May 2024, Pari NN announced that the option to buy has been activated and the club signed a three-year contract with Karapuzov.

On 11 September 2025, Karapuzov was loaned by Ural Yekaterinburg.

== Career statistics ==
As of match played 30 July 2025

Appearances and goals by club, season and competition
| Club | Season | League | | | Cup | | Europe | | Other | | Total | |
| Club | Season | Division | Apps | Goals | Apps | Goals | Apps | Goals | Apps | Goals | Apps | Goals |
|---|---|---|---|---|---|---|---|---|---|---|---|---|
| Kazanka Moscow | 2017–18 | Russian Second League | 1 | 0 | – | | – | | – | | 1 | 0 |
| Kazanka Moscow | 2018–19 | Russian Second League | 13 | 1 | – | | – | | – | | 13 | 1 |
| Kazanka Moscow | Total | | 14 | 1 | 0 | 0 | 0 | 0 | – | | 14 | 1 |
| Dynamo Moscow | 2019–20 | Russian Premier League | 5 | 0 | – | | – | | – | | 5 | 0 |
| Dynamo Moscow | 2020–21 | Russian Premier League | 5 | 0 | 0 | 0 | 0 | 0 | – | | 5 | 0 |
| Dynamo Moscow | 2022–23 | Russian Premier League | 4 | 0 | 1 | 0 | – | | – | | 5 | 0 |
| Dynamo Moscow | 2023–24 | Russian Premier League | 1 | 0 | 1 | 0 | – | | – | | 2 | 0 |
| Dynamo Moscow | Total | | 15 | 0 | 2 | 0 | 0 | 0 | – | | 17 | 0 |
| Dynamo-2 Moscow | 2020–21 | Russian Second League | 8 | 1 | – | | – | | – | | 8 | 1 |
| Tambov (loan) | 2020–21 | Russian Premier League | 10 | 0 | 1 | 0 | – | | – | | 11 | 0 |
| Akhmat Grozny (loan) | 2021–22 | Russian Premier League | 29 | 1 | 2 | 0 | – | | – | | 31 | 1 |
| Akhmat Grozny (loan) | 2022–23 | Russian Premier League | 18 | 2 | 5 | 0 | – | | – | | 23 | 2 |
| Nizhny Novgorod (loan) | 2023–24 | Russian Premier League | 22 | 0 | 3 | 0 | – | | 1 (Note: Appearance in relegation play-offs) | 0 | 26 | 0 |
| Nizhy Novgorod | 2024–25 | Russian Premier League | 15 | 0 | 5 | 0 | – | | 2 | 0 | 22 | 0 |
| Nizhy Novgorod | 2025–26 | Russian Premier League | 2 | 0 | 1 | 0 | – | | – | | 3 | 0 |
| Nizhy Novgorod | Total | | 17 | 0 | 6 | 0 | 0 | 0 | 2 | 0 | 25 | 0 |
| Career total | | | 133 | 5 | 19 | 0 | 0 | 0 | 3 | 0 | 155 | 5 |
