= Ivan Ordets =

Ukrainian footballer

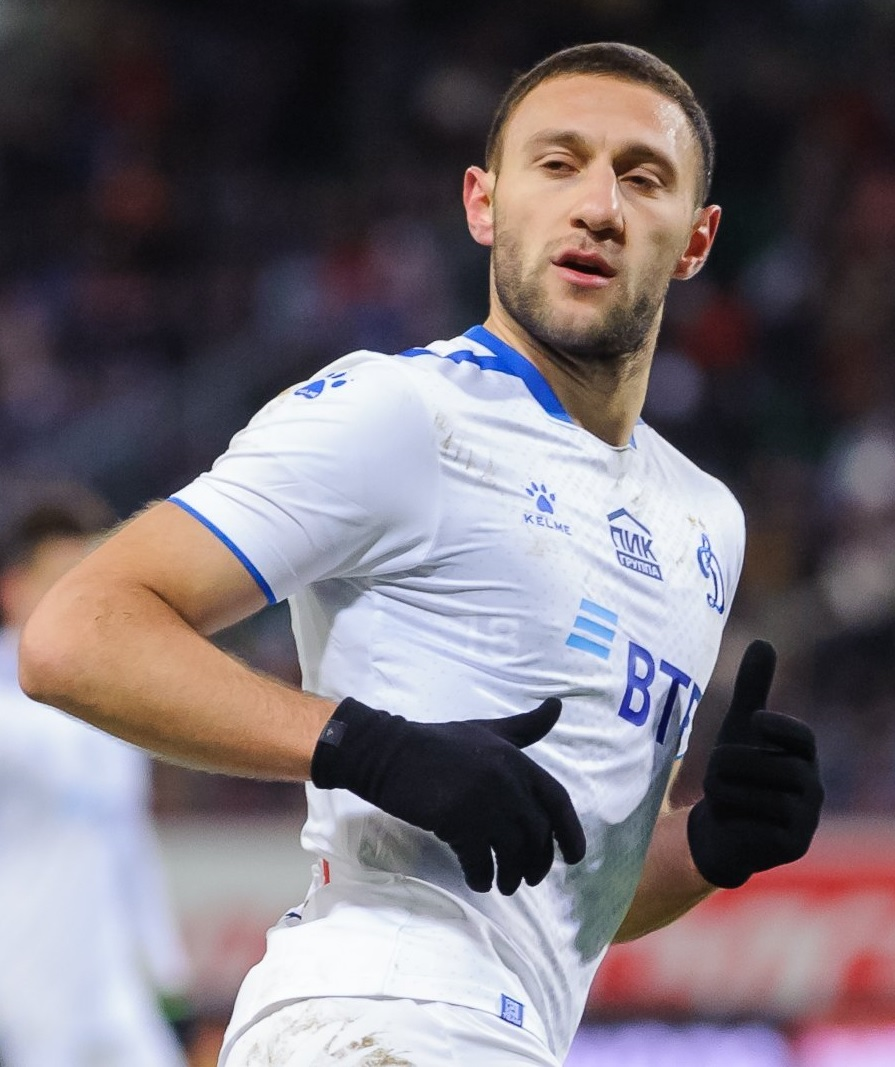
- Ordets with Dynamo Moscow in 2019

Personal information
- Full name: Ivan Mykolayovych Ordets
- Date of birth: 8 July 1992 (age 34)
- Place of birth: Blyzhnye, Donetsk Oblast, Ukraine
- Height: 1.95 m (6 ft 5 in)
- Position: Centre-back

Team information
- Current team: FC Aktobe
- Number: 18

Youth career
- 2005–2009: Shakhtar Donetsk

Senior career*
Years	Team	Apps	(Gls)
2009	Shakhtar-3 Donetsk	21	(4)
2009–2019	Shakhtar Donetsk	63	(4)
2011	→ Illichivets Mariupol (loan)	0	(0)
2013–2014	→ Illichivets Mariupol (loan)	39	(3)
2019–2024	Dynamo Moscow	62	(5)
2022–2024	→ VfL Bochum (loan)	54	(1)
2024–2025	VfL Bochum	22	(0)
2026–	FC Aktobe	24	(5)

International career^{‡}
2007–2009	Ukraine U17	24	(1)
2009–2010	Ukraine U19	20	(1)
2012–2014	Ukraine U21	12	(0)
2014–2018	Ukraine	12	(1)
- * Club domestic league appearances and goals as of 1 November 2026 ‡ National team caps and goals as of 8 January 2022

Ivan Mykolaiovych Ordets (Ukrainian: Іва́н Микола́йович Орде́ць; born 8 July 1992) is a Ukrainian professional footballer who plays as a centre-back for FC Aktobe. He is a former Ukraine national team player.

== Club career ==
Ordets started playing football at school age. He went on trial to Shakhtar Donetsk on 2 September 2002 and after two stages of selection he was enrolled in the group of Petro Ponomarenko. In the youth football league of Ukraine as a member of Shakhtar, he played 76 matches and scored 9 goals, but did not become champion of Ukraine: once he was a silver medalist (2007) and three times a bronze medalist (2006, 2008, 2009).

In the youth championship of Ukraine, he played 75 matches and scored 8 goals. In 2012, he became champion of Ukraine among reserves (in 2010, he was vice-champion).

In 2011, as part of a group of Donetsk talents, under the guidance of a youth coach, Valery Yaremchenko, he moved to Illichivets Mariupol. But the first attempt to gain a foothold in the main team of the Premier League club failed and Ordets returned to Shakhtar. But at the beginning of 2013, again going on loan, he noticeably improved the quality of the game and earned the trust of the new head coach Mykola Pavlov.

He made his debut in the Ukrainian Premier League on 2 March 2013 in the match against Metalurh Zaporizhia. He scored his first goal on 12 April 2013 against Volyn Lutsk. In the 2013–14 season, he played 27 matches in the Ukrainian Premier League without substitutions with a total of 2430 minutes played – more than anyone else on the team.

At the end of 2013, he was among the 33 best Ukrainian football players according to the Komanda newspaper.

In the summer of 2014 he returned to Shakhtar.

In the summer of 2019, he left Shakhtar and moved to Dynamo Moscow. At the start he was out of the starting eleven, only once having come on as a substitute in the match against Lokomotiv Moscow. In October, when a new head coach came, and the team began to play according to a different tactic, Ivan had much more minutes played on the field. He scored his first goal for Dynamo on 2 November 2019 against Akhmat Grozny, saving the team from defeat in the home field. He was voted "Player of the Month" for June/July 2020 by Dynamo fans. On 23 November 2021, he extended his contract until the end of the 2023–24 season with an option to extend for one more season.

On 10 July 2022, Ordets suspended his contract with Dynamo for the 2022–23 season using FIFA regulations related to the Russian invasion of Ukraine and joined VfL Bochum in Germany for the season. On 18 June 2023, Bochum announced that Ordets will stay with the club for the 2023–24 season as FIFA regulations have been extended for another season, with an option for two more seasons after his Dynamo contract expired on 30 June 2024.

On 31 December 2025, FC Aktobe officially announced the signing of Ordets on their Instagram account. He joined the Kazakh Premier League club as a free agent on 1 January 2026.

== International career ==
Ordets was a member of different Ukrainian national youth football teams. For the Ukraine U19 national team he scored one goal in a match against Sweden on 9 October 2010.

== Career statistics ==
=== Club ===
As of match played 10 May 2025

Appearances and goals by club, season and competition
Club	Season	League			National cup		Europe		Other		Total	
Club	Season	Division	Apps	Goals	Apps	Goals	Apps	Goals	Apps	Goals	Apps	Goals
Shakhtar-3	2008–09	Ukrainian Second League	9	3	–		–		–		9	3
Shakhtar-3	2009–10	Ukrainian Second League	12	1	–		–		–		12	1
Shakhtar-3	Total		21	4	–		–		–		21	4
Illichivets Mariupol (loan)	2010–11	Ukrainian Premier League	0	0	0	0	–		–		0	0
Illichivets Mariupol (loan)	2012–13	Ukrainian Premier League	12	1	0	0	–		–		12	1
Illichivets Mariupol (loan)	2013–14	Ukrainian Premier League	27	2	1	0	–		–		28	2
Illichivets Mariupol (loan)	Total		39	3	1	0	–		–		40	3
Shakhtar Donetsk	2014–15	Ukrainian Premier League	9	0	3	0	1 (Note: Appearance(s) in UEFA Champions League)	0	0	0	13	0
Shakhtar Donetsk	2015–16	Ukrainian Premier League	16	0	5	0	6 (Note: Three appearances in UEFA Champions League, three appearances in UEFA Europa League)	0	0	0	27	0
Shakhtar Donetsk	2016–17	Ukrainian Premier League	20	4	2	0	8 (Note: Two appearances in UEFA Champions League, six appearances in UEFA Europa League)	0	1 (Note: Appearance in Ukrainian Super Cup)	0	31	4
Shakhtar Donetsk	2017–18	Ukrainian Premier League	16	0	1	0	8	0	1	0	26	0
Shakhtar Donetsk	2018–19	Ukrainian Premier League	2	0	0	0	0	0	0	0	2	0
Shakhtar Donetsk	Total		63	4	11	0	23	0	2	0	99	4
Dynamo Moscow	2019–20	Russian Premier League	17	1	1	0	–		–		18	1
Dynamo Moscow	2020–21	Russian Premier League	27	3	2	0	1 (Note: Appearance in UEFA Europa League)	0	–		30	3
Dynamo Moscow	2021–22	Russian Premier League	18	1	1	0	–		–		19	1
Dynamo Moscow	Total		62	5	4	0	1	0	–		67	5
VfL Bochum (loan)	2022–23	Bundesliga	30	0	3	0	–		–		33	0
VfL Bochum (loan)	2023–24	Bundesliga	24	0	1	0	–		–		25	0
VfL Bochum (loan)	Total		54	0	4	0	–		–		58	0
VfL Bochum	2024–25	Bundesliga	22	0	0	0	–		–		22	0
Career total			261	16	20	0	24	0	2	0	307	16

=== International ===
As of 8 January 2022

Appearances and goals by national team and year
National team	Year	Apps	Goals
Ukraine	2014	2	1
Ukraine	2015	0	0
Ukraine	2016	3	0
Ukraine	2017	5	0
Ukraine	2018	2	0
Total		12	1

Scores and results list Ukraine's goal tally first, score column indicates score after each Ordets goal.

List of international goals scored by Ivan Ordets
No.	Date	Venue	Opponent	Score	Result	Competition
1	22 May 2014	V. Lobanovskyi Stadium, Kyiv, Ukraine	Niger	1–0	2–1	Friendly

== Honours ==
Shakhtar Donetsk

- Ukrainian Premier League: 2016–17, 2017–18, 2018–19
- Ukrainian Cup: 2015–16, 2016–17, 2017–18, 2018–19
- Ukrainian Super Cup: 2014, 2015, 2017

Individual

- Golden talent of Ukraine: 2013 (U-21)
