= Grigori Morozov =

Russian footballer (born 1994)

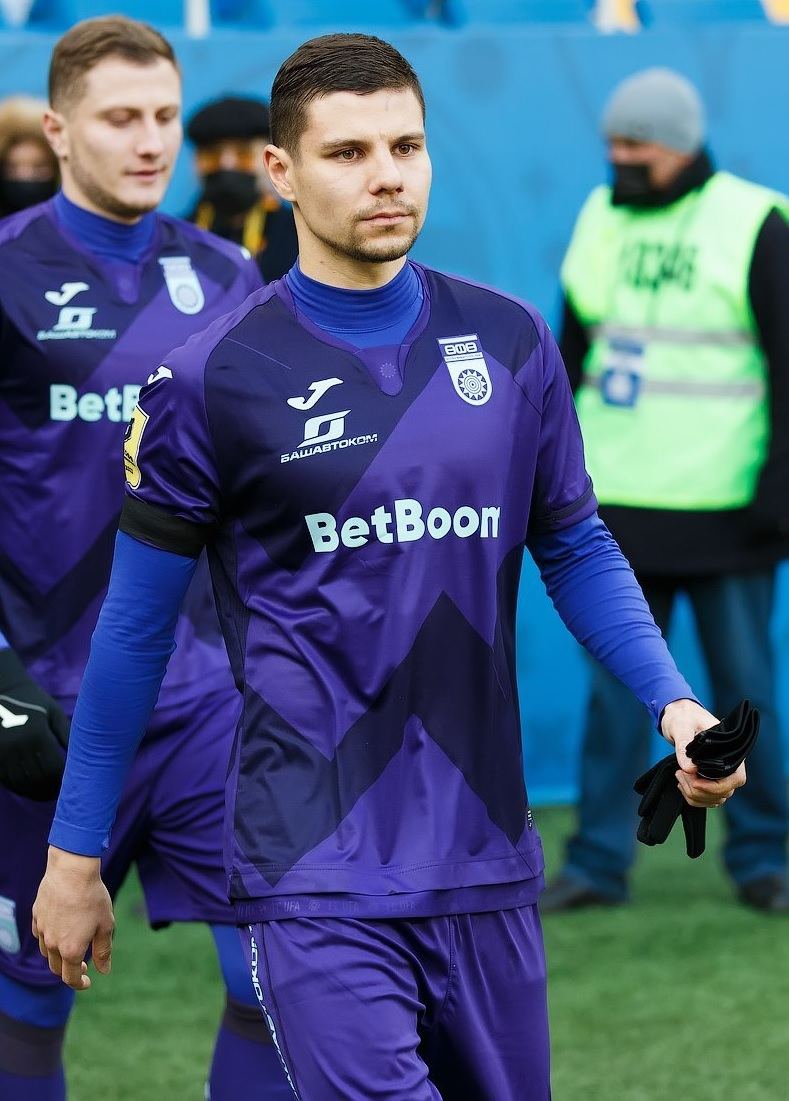
- Morozov with Ufa in 2020

Personal information
- Full name: Grigori Pavlovich Morozov
- Date of birth: 6 June 1994 (age 32)
- Place of birth: Izhevsk, Russia
- Height: 1.83 m (6 ft 0 in)
- Positions: Left-back; right-back

Team information
- Current team: Maccabi Netanya
- Number: 2

Senior career*
Years	Team	Apps	(Gls)
2011–2012	Akademiya Tolyatti	7	(0)
2013–2022	Dynamo Moscow	110	(4)
2020–2021	→ Ufa (loan)	13	(0)
2021–2022	Dynamo-2 Moscow	7	(1)
2022–2023	Celje	26	(4)
2023	→ Beitar Jerusalem (loan)	13	(1)
2023–2026	Beitar Jerusalem	90	(5)
2026–	Maccabi Netanya	3	(0)

International career
2010	Russia U16	6	(0)
2010–2011	Russia U17	12	(0)
2012	Russia U18	7	(0)
2014–2015	Russia U21	3	(0)
- * Club domestic league appearances and goals as of 19 September 2026

Grigori Pavlovich Morozov (also spelled Grigory, Russian: Григорий Павлович Морозов, Hebrew: גריגורי מורוזוב; born 6 June 1994) is a Russian footballer who plays as a defender for Israeli Premier League club Maccabi Netanya. His primary position is left-back, but can also play at right-back.

He also holds an Israeli passport.

== Club career ==
Morozov made his debut in the Russian Second Division for Akademiya Tolyatti on 18 April 2012 in a game against Khimik Dzerzhinsk.

He made his Russian Football Premier League debut for Dynamo Moscow on 2 August 2015 in a game against Lokomotiv Moscow, and scored on his debut in a 1–1 draw. In his third game for Dynamo, on 16 August 2015, he scored the only goal in a 1–0 home victory over Ural Sverdlovsk Oblast.

On 24 June 2019, he signed a new three-year contract with Dynamo.

On 17 October 2020, he was loaned to Ufa for the 2020–21 season. Upon his return from Ufa, he did not train with the main squad and started the 2021–22 season with the reserves. On 6 February 2022, Morozov's contract with Dynamo was terminated by mutual consent.

On 14 February 2022, Morozov signed a two-and-a-half-year contract with Slovenian PrvaLiga side Celje.

On 31 December 2022, he was loaned for the rest of the season to Israeli Premier League side Beitar Jerusalem. After winning the 2022–23 Israel State Cup in May 2023, Morozov transferred to Beitar on a permanent deal.

== Personal life ==
Morozov has Jewish roots and received Israeli citizenship in December 2022 through Israel's Law of Return.

== Career statistics ==
As of 1 June 2024

Appearances and goals by club, season and competition
Club	Season	League			National cup (Note: Includes Russian Cup, Slovenian Cup, Israel State Cup)		Continental		Total	
Club	Season	Division	Apps	Goals	Apps	Goals	Apps	Goals	Apps	Goals
Akademiya Tolyatti	2011–12	Russian Second Division	7	0	0	0	—		7	0
Akademiya Tolyatti	Total		7	0	0	0	—		7	0
Dynamo Moscow	2012–13	Russian Premier League	0	0	0	0	0	0	0	0
Dynamo Moscow	2013–14	Russian Premier League	0	0	0	0	—		0	0
Dynamo Moscow	2014–15	Russian Premier League	0	0	0	0	0	0	0	0
Dynamo Moscow	2015–16	Russian Premier League	21	2	2	0	—		23	2
Dynamo Moscow	2016–17	Russian National League	30	1	2	0	—		32	1
Dynamo Moscow	2017–18	Russian Premier League	13	0	1	0	—		14	0
Dynamo Moscow	2018–19	Russian Premier League	22	0	2	0	—		24	0
Dynamo Moscow	2019–20	Russian Premier League	21	1	1	0	—		22	1
Dynamo Moscow	2020–21	Russian Premier League	3	0	—		1 (Note: Appearance(s) in UEFA Europa League)	0	4	0
Dynamo Moscow	Total		110	4	8	0	1	0	119	4
Ufa	2020–21	Russian Premier League	13	0	2	0	—		15	0
Dynamo-2 Moscow	2021–22	Russian FNL 2	7	1	—		—		7	1
Celje	2021–22	Slovenian PrvaLiga	12	4	1	0	—		13	4
Celje	2022–23	Slovenian PrvaLiga	14	0	2	0	—		16	0
Celje	Total		26	4	3	0	0	0	29	4
Beitar Jerusalem	2022–23 (loan)	Israeli Premier League	13	1	2	0	—		15	1
Beitar Jerusalem	2023–24	Israeli Premier League	30	2	1	0	2 (Note: Appearance(s) in UEFA Europa Conference League)	0	33	2
Beitar Jerusalem	2024–25	Israeli Premier League	0	0	0	0	0	0	0	0
Beitar Jerusalem	Total		43	1	2	0	2	0	24	1
Career total			206	12	16	0	3	0	225	12

== Honours ==
FC Dynamo-2 Moscow

- Russian First League: 2016–17

Beitar Jerusalem

- Israel State Cup: 2022–23
