= Nikola Moro =

Croatian footballer (born 1998)

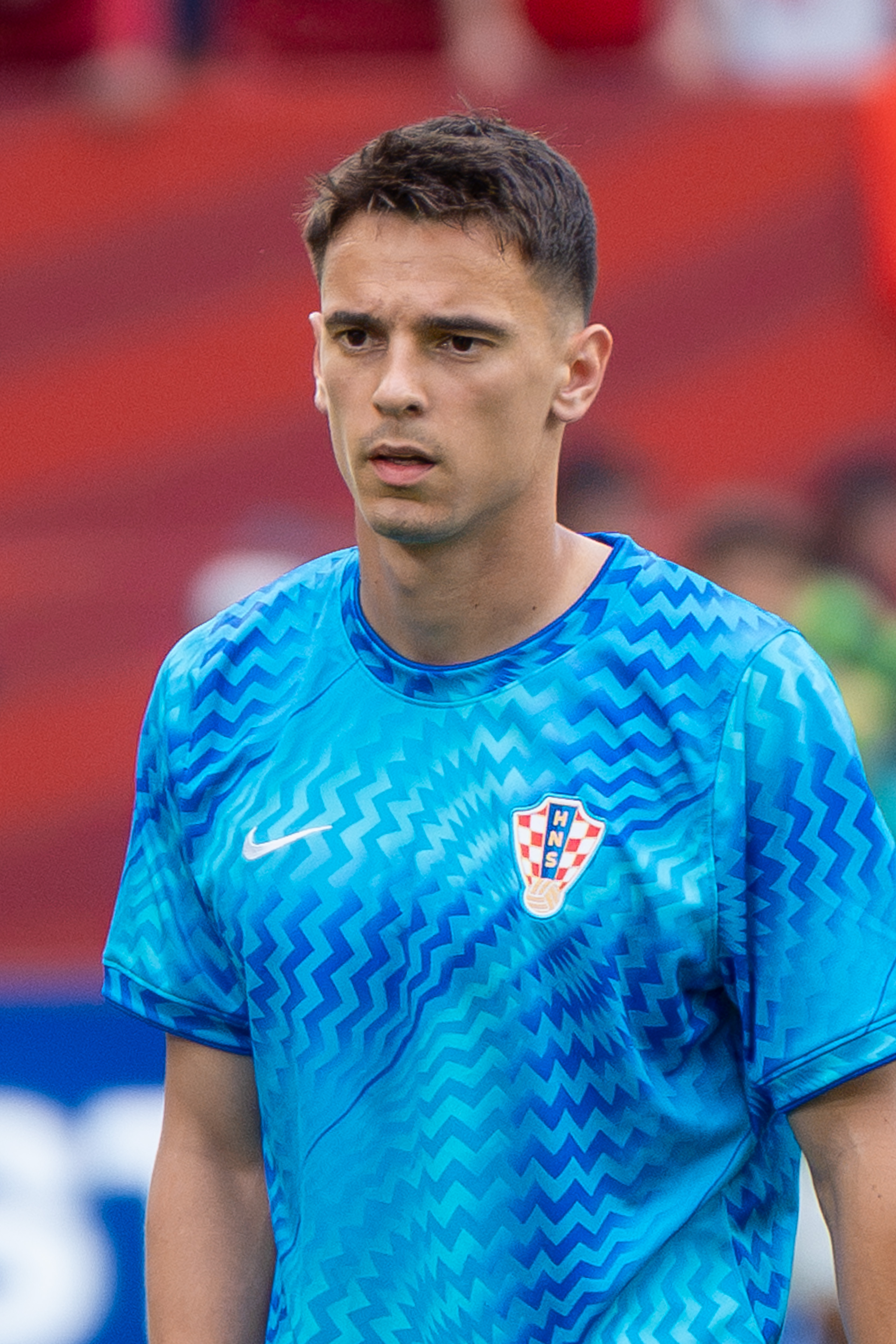
- Moro with Croatia in 2026

Personal information
- Date of birth: 12 March 1998 (age 28)
- Place of birth: Split, Croatia
- Height: 1.84 m (6 ft 0 in)
- Position: Defensive midfielder

Team information
- Current team: Bologna
- Number: 6

Youth career
- 2004–2009: Solin
- 2009–2014: Dinamo Zagreb

Senior career*
Years	Team	Apps	(Gls)
2014–2019	Dinamo Zagreb II	30	(7)
2016–2020	Dinamo Zagreb	87	(10)
2020–2023	Dynamo Moscow	58	(4)
2022–2023	→ Bologna (loan)	26	(1)
2023–	Bologna	80	(3)

International career^{‡}
2012	Croatia U14	2	(0)
2013	Croatia U15	4	(1)
2014	Croatia U16	6	(0)
2014–2015	Croatia U17	17	(7)
2014–2015	Croatia U18	7	(1)
2016–2017	Croatia U19	12	(2)
2017–2021	Croatia U21	24	(6)
2022–	Croatia	10	(0)
- * Club domestic league appearances and goals as of 20:04, 17 October 2026 (UTC) ‡ National team caps and goals as of 23:51, 2 June 2026 (UTC)

Nikola Moro (Italian pronunciation: [nǐkola môːro]; born 12 March 1998) is a Croatian professional footballer who plays as a defensive midfielder for Serie A club Bologna and the Croatia national team.

== Club career ==
=== Dinamo Zagreb ===
Aged six, he started football, moving to Zagreb aged 11. A Hajduk Split fan in his early days in Solin, Nikola's father Miro yearned for him to contemplate a career at the Hajduk academy, but he went to the Dinamo Zagreb academy instead. Nikola joined the senior Dinamo Zagreb team from the youth academy in 2014.

Moro played a full 90 minutes in his league debut for his senior team versus Lokomotiva in May 2016. He made his Champions League debut on 7 December, in a 2–0 away defeat to Juventus. On 22 February 2017, he signed a new contract until 2022.

On 27 March 2018, in an international match against Moldova U21, he suffered a severe injury after tearing his anterior cruciate ligament. He came back to the team on 26 September for the Croatian Cup game against Sloga Mravince. He made his Europa League debut on 14 February 2019 in a 2–1 away defeat against Viktoria Plzeň.

On 6 November, in a decisive Champions League home match against Shakhtar Donetsk, he was sent off in the 74th minute with Shakhtar scoring a late equalizer for 3–3 to deny Dinamo a direct qualification for the knockout phase.

=== Dynamo Moscow ===
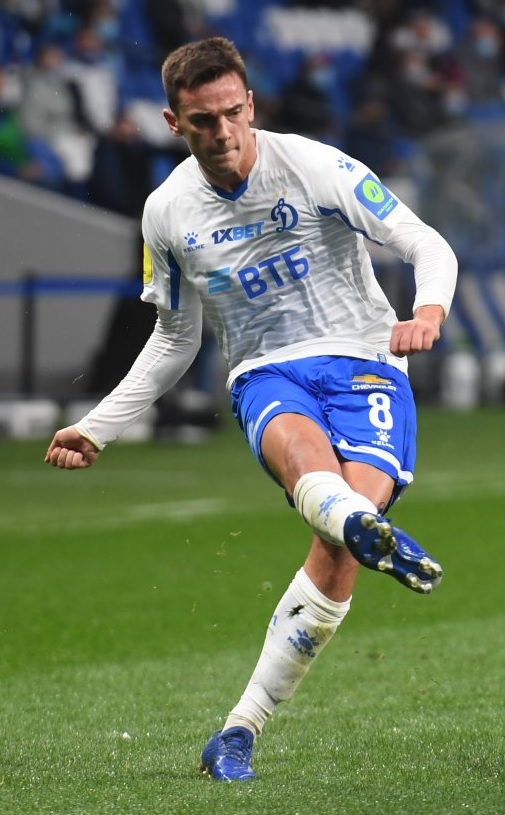
Moro playing for Dynamo Moscow in 2020

On 17 August 2020, Moro signed a five-year contract with Russian Premier League club Dynamo Moscow. He made his debut two days later in a 2–0 victory against Rostov, coming on for Daniil Fomin in the 69th minute. On 18 October, he scored his first goal for the club as Dynamo lost 3–1 against CSKA Moscow.

=== Bologna ===
On 29 August 2022, Moro joined Bologna in Italy on loan until the end of the 2022–23 season, with an option to buy. On 2 July 2023, Bologna activated the buy option and made his transfer permanent.

== International career ==
Representing Croatia at U16, U17, and U19 levels, Moro made the quarter-finals of the 2015 FIFA U-17 World Cup – eventually losing against Mali. He also represented Croatia U21 at the 2019 and 2021 UEFA Under-21 Euros, captaining the team to the quarter-finals of the latter tournament for the first time in their history.

On 17 May 2021, Moro was named in the preliminary 34-man squad for the UEFA Euro 2020, but did not make the final 26. He earned his first call-up to the senior Croatia team on 16 August 2021, ahead of the September World Cup qualifiers against Russia, Slovakia and Slovenia. However, Moro did not debut until 29 March 2022, when he made an appearance in a 2–1 friendly victory against Bulgaria.

On 18 May 2026, Moro was selected in the 26-man squad for the 2026 FIFA World Cup.

== Career statistics ==
=== Club ===
As of match played 17 October 2026

Appearances and goals by club, season and competition
Club	Season	League			National cup (Note: Includes Croatian Cup, Russian Cup, Coppa Italia)		Europe		Other		Total	
Club	Season	Division	Apps	Goals	Apps	Goals	Apps	Goals	Apps	Goals	Apps	Goals
Dinamo Zagreb II	2015–16	Druga HNL	12	0	—		—		—		12	0
Dinamo Zagreb II	2016–17	Druga HNL	13	5	—		—		—		13	5
Dinamo Zagreb II	2018–19	Druga HNL	5	2	—		—		—		5	2
Dinamo Zagreb II	Total		30	7	—		—		—		30	7
Dinamo Zagreb	2015–16	Prva HNL	1	0	1	0	—		—		2	0
Dinamo Zagreb	2016–17	Prva HNL	15	1	2	0	1 (Note: Appearances in UEFA Champions League)	0	—		18	1
Dinamo Zagreb	2017–18	Prva HNL	24	4	2	0	4 (Note: Appearances in UEFA Europa League)	0	—		30	4
Dinamo Zagreb	2018–19	Prva HNL	19	3	1	0	4	0	—		24	3
Dinamo Zagreb	2019–20	Prva HNL	28	2	3	0	9	0	1 (Note: Appearance in Croatian Super Cup)	0	41	2
Dinamo Zagreb	Total		87	10	9	0	18	0	1	0	115	10
Dynamo Moscow	2020–21	Russian Premier League	24	3	2	0	0	0	—		26	3
Dynamo Moscow	2021–22	Russian Premier League	28	1	6	1	—		—		34	2
Dynamo Moscow	2022–23	Russian Premier League	6	0	0	0	—		—		6	0
Dynamo Moscow	Total		58	4	8	1	0	0	—		66	5
Bologna (loan)	2022–23	Serie A	26	1	2	0	—		—		28	1
Bologna	2023–24	Serie A	23	1	4	1	—		—		27	2
Bologna	2024–25	Serie A	22	0	3	0	7	0	—		32	0
Bologna	2025–26	Serie A	30	2	1	0	11	0	2 (Note: Appearances in Supercoppa Italiana)	0	44	2
Bologna	2026–27	Serie A	5	0	0	0	—		—		5	0
Bologna	Bologna total		106	4	10	1	18	0	2	0	136	5
Career total			281	25	27	2	36	0	3	0	347	27

=== International ===
As of match played 2 June 2026

Appearances and goals by national team and year
National team	Year	Apps	Goals
Croatia	2022	1	0
Croatia	2023	0	0
Croatia	2024	1	0
Croatia	2025	5	0
Croatia	2026	3	0
Total		10	0

== Honours ==
Dinamo Zagreb

- Prva HNL: 2015–16, 2017–18, 2018–19, 2019–20
- Croatian Cup: 2020–21
- Croatian Super Cup: 2019

Bologna

- Coppa Italia: 2024–25

Individual

- 2015 UEFA European Under-17 Championship Team of the Tournament
