= Daniil Grigoryev =

Russian footballer

Personal information
- Full name: Daniil Aleksandrovich Grigoryev
- Date of birth: 16 March 2002 (age 24)
- Place of birth: Belgorod, Russia
- Height: 1.73 m (5 ft 8 in)
- Position: Midfielder

Team information
- Current team: Metallurg Lipetsk
- Number: 13

Youth career
- –2015: DYuSSh-6 Belgorod
- 2015–2018: Energomash Shebekino
- 2018–2019: Konoplyov football academy
- 2019–2020: Spartak Moscow
- 2021: Prato

Senior career*
Years	Team	Apps	(Gls)
2022–2023	Alania Vladikavkaz	7	(0)
2022–2023	Alania-2 Vladikavkaz	9	(0)
2023	SKA-Khabarovsk	1	(0)
2023	SKA-Khabarovsk-2	5	(0)
2023–2024	Ufa	25	(1)
2024	Yenisey Krasnoyarsk	12	(1)
2025	Tyumen	1	(0)
2025–2026	Sibir Novosibirsk	11	(0)
2026–	Metallurg Lipetsk	28	(9)
- * Club domestic league appearances and goals as of 31 October 2026

Daniil Aleksandrovich Grigoryev (Russian: Даниил Александрович Григорьев; born 16 March 2002) is a Russian football player who plays for Metallurg Lipetsk.

== Club career ==
He made his debut in the Russian Football National League for Alania Vladikavkaz on 6 March 2022 in a game against Tekstilshchik Ivanovo.
