= Maksim Danilin (footballer, born May 2001) =

Russian footballer

Personal information
- Full name: Maksim Nikolayevich Danilin
- Date of birth: 26 May 2001 (age 25)
- Place of birth: Novomoskovsk, Russia
- Height: 1.86 m (6 ft 1 in)
- Position: Forward

Team information
- Current team: FC 10 Moscow (amateur)

Youth career
- 2009–2014: FC Khimik Novomoskovsk
- 2014–2017: PFC CSKA Moscow
- 2017–2019: FC Dynamo Moscow

Senior career*
Years	Team	Apps	(Gls)
2020–2023	FC Dynamo Moscow	2	(0)
2020	→ FC Dynamo-2 Moscow	15	(3)
2021	→ FC Dynamo Bryansk (loan)	11	(2)
2021–2022	→ FC Neftekhimik Nizhnekamsk (loan)	9	(2)
2022–2023	→ FC Torpedo Moscow (loan)	2	(0)
2022–2023	→ FC Torpedo-2 (loan)	20	(4)
2023	FC Torpedo Moscow	0	(0)
2023	→ FC Tekstilshchik Ivanovo (loan)	7	(1)
2024	FC Broke Boys Moscow (amateur)		
2024–	FC 10 Moscow (amateur)		

International career^{‡}
2018–2019	Russia U-18	13	(1)
2019–2020	Russia U-19	3	(1)
- * Club domestic league appearances and goals as of 12 November 2024 ‡ National team caps and goals as of 11 February 2020

Maksim Nikolayevich Danilin (Russian: Максим Николаевич Данилин; born 26 May 2001) is a Russian football player who plays as a centre-forward for amateur club 10 Moscow.

== Club career ==
He made his debut in the Russian Premier League for FC Dynamo Moscow on 9 July 2020 in a game against FC Ural Yekaterinburg, replacing Nikolay Komlichenko in the 67th minute. He made his first starting lineup appearance on 19 July 2020 in a game against FC Krasnodar.

On 25 February 2021, he joined FNL club FC Dynamo Bryansk on loan until the end of the 2020–21 season.

On 24 June 2021, he moved on a new loan to FC Neftekhimik Nizhnekamsk.
