= Sergei Parshivlyuk =

Russian footballer

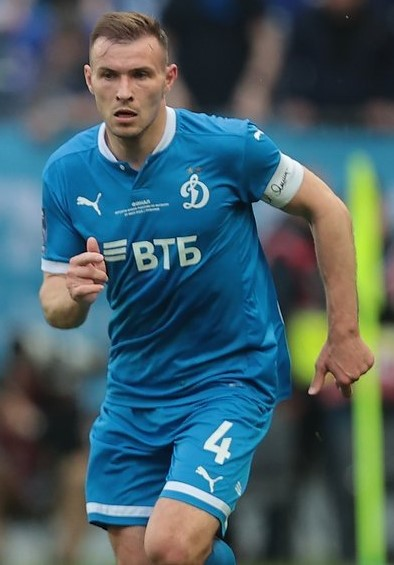
- Parshivlyuk with Dynamo Moscow in 2022

Personal information
- Full name: Sergei Viktorovich Parshivlyuk
- Date of birth: 18 March 1989 (age 37)
- Place of birth: Moscow, Soviet Union
- Height: 1.79 m (5 ft 10 in)
- Position: Right-back

Team information
- Current team: Dynamo Moscow (assistant coach)

Youth career
- 1996–2006: Spartak Moscow

Senior career*
Years	Team	Apps	(Gls)
2007–2016	Spartak Moscow	148	(3)
2016	→ Spartak-2 Moscow	7	(0)
2016–2017	Anzhi Makhachkala	19	(0)
2017–2019	Rostov	53	(2)
2019–2024	Dynamo Moscow	92	(1)

International career
2008–2010	Russia U-21	11	(0)
2014	Russia	3	(0)

Managerial career
- 2024–2026: Dynamo Moscow (assistant)
- 2026–: Dynamo Moscow (assistant)
- * Club domestic league appearances and goals

Sergei Viktorovich Parshivlyuk (Russian: Сергей Викторович Паршивлюк; born 18 March 1989) is a Russian coach and a former player who played as a right-back. He is an assistant manager with Dynamo Moscow.

== Career ==
=== Club ===
Parshivlyuk attended "Spartak Moscow" football school. In his youth, he began as a forward, then as a right midfielder, and he has finally become a right back. He made his first appearance for the senior team on 27 July 2007 when he came off the substitutes' bench to replace Martin Jiránek in a league game against Zenit St. Petersburg. His debut at the European level came on 4 October 2007 in a UEFA Cup match between BK Häcken and Spartak. In the 2011–12 season, Parshivlyuk was named as club captain at Spartak.

On 31 August 2016, Parshivlyuk signed a three-year contract with Anzhi Makhachkala.

On 9 June 2017, he moved to Rostov, signing a 2-year contract.

On 24 June 2019, he signed a 2-year contract with an 1-year extension option with Dynamo Moscow. He extended his contract with Dynamo for the 2021–22 season on 12 June 2021. On 20 June 2022, he extended his contract for 2022–23 season and announced he will also enroll in a coaching academy, with hope to eventually transition to Dynamo's coaching staff. On 27 June 2023, he extended his contract for the 2023–24 season. Parshivlyuk retired from playing in June 2024.

== International career ==
Parshivlyuk was included as part of the Russia U21 squad that competed in the 2011 European Under-21 Championship qualification.

He was called up but did not feature with the Russia national football team for the Euro 2012 qualifier in October 2010 against Macedonia and Ireland. He made his debut for the team on 3 September 2014 in a friendly against Azerbaijan.

== Career statistics ==
=== Club ===
Appearances and goals by club, season and competition
Club	Season	League			Cup		Continental		Other		Total	
Club	Season	Division	Apps	Goals	Apps	Goals	Apps	Goals	Apps	Goals	Apps	Goals
Spartak Moscow	2006	Russian Premier League	0	0	0	0	0	0	–		0	0
Spartak Moscow	2007	Russian Premier League	2	0	0	0	2	0	–		4	0
Spartak Moscow	2008	Russian Premier League	18	0	2	0	9	0	–		29	0
Spartak Moscow	2009	Russian Premier League	21	1	1	0	–		–		22	1
Spartak Moscow	2010	Russian Premier League	21	0	1	0	3	0	–		25	0
Spartak Moscow	2011–12	Russian Premier League	19	0	1	0	1	0	–		21	0
Spartak Moscow	2012–13	Russian Premier League	0	0	0	0	0	0	–		0	0
Spartak Moscow	2013–14	Russian Premier League	25	2	1	0	1	0	–		27	2
Spartak Moscow	2014–15	Russian Premier League	26	0	2	0	–		–		28	0
Spartak Moscow	2015–16	Russian Premier League	16	0	1	0	–		–		17	0
Spartak Moscow	2016–17	Russian Premier League	0	0	0	0	0	0	–		0	0
Spartak Moscow	Total		148	3	9	0	16	0	–		173	3
Spartak-2 Moscow	2016–17	Russian First League	7	0	–		–		–		7	0
Anzhi Makhachkala	2016–17	Russian Premier League	19	0	1	0	–		–		20	0
Rostov	2017–18	Russian Premier League	29	1	2	1	–		–		31	2
Rostov	2018–19	Russian Premier League	24	1	2	0	–		–		26	1
Rostov	Total		53	2	4	1	0	0	–		57	3
Dynamo Moscow	2019–20	Russian Premier League	17	0	0	0	–		–		17	0
Dynamo Moscow	2020–21	Russian Premier League	22	0	2	0	1	0	–		25	0
Dynamo Moscow	2021–22	Russian Premier League	19	0	5	0	–		–		24	0
Dynamo Moscow	2022–23	Russian Premier League	19	1	3	0	–		–		22	1
Dynamo Moscow	2023–24	Russian Premier League	15	0	6	0	–		–		21	0
Dynamo Moscow	Total		92	1	16	0	1	0	–		109	1
Career total			319	6	30	1	17	0	0	0	366	7
