= 2024–25 FC Fakel Voronezh season =

FC Fakel Voronezh
2024–25 season
- Stadium: Arena Fakel Voronezh
- Russian Premier League: Pre-season
- Russian Cup: Pre-season

The 2024–25 season is the 78th season in the history of FC Fakel Voronezh, and the club's third consecutive season in the Russian Premier League. In addition to the domestic league, the team is scheduled to participate in the Russian Cup.

== Transfers ==
=== In ===
Pos.	Player	Transferred from	Fee	Date	Source
DF	(Russia) Maks Dziov	(Belarus) Dynamo Brest	Undisclosed	3 July 2024	

== Competitions ==
=== Overall record ===
Competition	First match	Last match	Starting round	Record							
Competition	First match	Last match	Starting round	Pld	W	D	L	GF	GA	GD	Win %
Russian Premier League	19–22 July 2024	24 May 2025	Matchday 1	1	0	0	1	1	3	−2	0.00
Russian Cup	30 July 2024			0	0	0	0	0	0	+0	—
Total				1	0	0	1	1	3	−2	0.00

Last updated: 20 July 2024
Source: Soccerway

=== Russian Premier League ===
==== League table ====
Pos	Team	Pld	W	D	L	GF	GA	GD	Pts	Qualification or relegation
12	Khimki (D, R)	30	6	11	13	35	56	−21	29 (Note: Dynamo Makhachkala 4–1 Khimki, Khimki 1–1 Dynamo Makhachkala)	Administratively relegated, then dissolved. (Note: Khimki were not issued the 2025–26 RPL license and were administratively relegated. They were replaced by Pari Nizhny Novgorod. Khimki were then dissolved.)
13	Pari Nizhny Novgorod (X)	30	7	6	17	27	54	−27	27	Qualification to relegation play-offs
14	Akhmat Grozny (O)	30	4	13	13	27	48	−21	25	Qualification to relegation play-offs
15	Orenburg (Note: Orenburg was originally relegated, then returned to Russian Premier League on 11 July 2025 to replace Torpedo Moscow which was originally promoted and then removed from the league for attempted match-fixing in the previous season.)	30	4	7	19	28	56	−28	19	
16	Fakel Voronezh (R)	30	2	12	16	14	42	−28	18	Relegation to First League

Source: Premier Liga
Rules for classification: 1) Points; 2) Head-to-head points; 3) Head-to-head matches won; 4) Head-to-head goal difference; 5) Head-to-head goals scored; 6) Matches won; 7) Goal difference; 8) Goals scored; 9) 2023–24 position (not applicable to final standings); 10) Play-off. Note: if teams tied on points did not play an equal number of head-to-head games, head-to-head results are not considered for the standings.
(D) Disqualified; (O) Play-off winners; (R) Relegated; (X) Lost in the play-offs, reprieved from relegation after Khimki was administratively relegated.

==== Results summary ====
Overall								Home						Away					
Pld	W	D	L	GF	GA	GD	Pts	W	D	L	GF	GA	GD	W	D	L	GF	GA	GD
1	0	0	1	1	3	−2	0	0	0	0	0	0	0	0	0	1	1	3	−2

==== Results by round ====
Round	1	2
Ground	A	H
Result	L	
Position		

A = Away; H = Home; W = Win; D = Draw; L = Loss

==== Matches ====
The match schedule was released on 20 June 2024.

20 July 2024 1	Dynamo Moscow	3–1	Fakel Voronezh	Moscow
20:00 MSK	Lepsky 3'; Majstorović (yellow card) 20'; Moumi Ngamaleu 21'; Gladyshev 28', (yellow card) 56'; Bessmertny (yellow card) 31'; Fomin (red card) 40'; Lunev (yellow card) 82'; Dasa (yellow card) 85'	Report	Kvekveskiri (yellow card) 16'; Bryzgalov (yellow card) 38'; Ilyin (yellow card) 46'; Moțpan (yellow card) 64'; Markov 74'	Stadium: VTB Arena; Attendance: 11,117; Referee: Kirill Levnikov

27 July 2024 2	Fakel Voronezh	v	Akron Tolyatti	Voronezh
20:00 MSK				Stadium: Central Stadium of Trade Unions

=== Russian Cup ===
==== Group stage ====
30 July 2024 1	Fakel Voronezh	v	Zenit Saint Petersburg	Voronezh
21:00 MSK				Stadium: Central Stadium

15 August 2024 2	Fakel Voronezh	v	Akron Tolyatti	Voronezh
18:00 MSK				Stadium: Central Stadium

27 August 2024 3	Fakel Voronezh	v	Rubin Kazan	Voronezh
19:30 MSK				Stadium: Central Stadium

September 2024 4	Akron Tolyatti	v	Fakel Voronezh	Zhigulevsk
TBA				Stadium: Kristall Stadium
