= 2023–24 FC Dynamo Moscow season =

FC Dynamo Moscow
2023–24 season
- General Director: Pavel Pivovarov
- Head coach: Marcel Lička
- Stadium: VTB Arena
- Russian Premier League: 3rd
- Russian Cup: Quarter-finals
- Top goalscorer: League: Konstantin Tyukavin (15); All: Konstantin Tyukavin (17)
- Highest home attendance: 26,121 vs Fakel, 8 October 2023, Russian Premier League; Ural, 29 October 2023, Russian Premier League
- Lowest home attendance: 5,138 vs Rubin Kazan, 4 December 2023, Russian Premier League
- Average home league attendance: 11,131
- Biggest win: 1–4 vs Pari Nizhny Novgorod (A), 21 April 2024, Russian Premier League
- Biggest defeat: 1–4 vs Rostov (H), 29 March 2024, Russian Premier League
colours	Away colours

The 2023–24 season was FC Dynamo Moscow's 101st season in existence and 31st consecutive in the Russian Premier League. They also competed in the Russian Cup.

== Players ==
=== First-team squad ===
As of 14 September 2023, according to the RPL official website

Note: Flags indicate national team as defined under FIFA eligibility rules; some limited exceptions apply. Players may hold more than one non-FIFA nationality.

No.	Pos.	Nation	Player
1	GK	RUS	Anton Shunin
2	DF	ISR	Eli Dasa
3	DF	PAR	Fabián Balbuena
4	DF	RUS	Sergei Parshivlyuk
5	DF	SRB	Milan Majstorović
6	DF	PAR	Roberto Fernández
7	MF	RUS	Dmitri Skopintsev
10	FW	RUS	Fyodor Smolov
11	MF	RUS	Daniil Lesovoy
13	FW	CMR	Moumi Ngamaleu
15	DF	GEO	Saba Sazonov
16	GK	RUS	Ivan Budachyov
17	MF	RUS	Vladislav Karapuzov
18	DF	URU	Nicolás Marichal
20	FW	RUS	Vyacheslav Grulyov
22	MF	RUS	Igor Shkolik
25	MF	RUS	Denis Makarov
27	DF	RUS	Ruslan Shagiakhmetov

No.	Pos.	Nation	Player
31	GK	RUS	Igor Leshchuk
32	FW	RUS	Ulvi Babayev
34	MF	GEO	Luka Gagnidze
43	DF	RUS	Denis Osokin
47	MF	RUS	Arsen Zakharyan
50	DF	RUS	Aleksandr Kutitsky
70	FW	RUS	Konstantin Tyukavin
74	MF	RUS	Daniil Fomin
78	MF	RUS	Georgy Sulakvelidze
89	MF	BRA	Bitello
90	MF	RUS	Vladislav Galkin
91	FW	RUS	Yaroslav Gladyshev
93	DF	URU	Diego Laxalt
95	MF	RUS	Dmitry Begun
—	FW	RUS	Maksim Danilin

==== Out on loan ====
Note: Flags indicate national team as defined under FIFA eligibility rules; some limited exceptions apply. Players may hold more than one non-FIFA nationality.

No.	Pos.	Nation	Player
—	DF	UKR	Ivan Ordets (at VfL Bochum until 30 June 2024)

== Transfers ==
=== In ===
Date	Position	Nationality	Name	From	Fee	Ref.
18 August 2023	GK	(Belarus)	Andrey Kudravets	BATE Borisov	€400,000	
14 September 2023	CM	(Brazil)	Bitello	Grêmio	€10,000,000	

=== Out ===
Date	Position	Nationality	Name	To	Fee	Ref.
2 July 2023	MF	(Croatia)	Nikola Moro	Bologna	€2,500,000	
4 July 2023	MF	(Russia)	Maksim Danilin	Torpedo Moscow	Free transfer	
12 July 2023	MF	(Poland)	Sebastian Szymański	Fenerbahçe	€9,750,000	
19 August 2023	GK	(Belarus)	Andrey Kudravets	BATE Borisov	Loan transfer	

== Pre-season and friendlies ==
4 July 2023 Friendly	Dinamo Moscow (Russia)	2–1	(Russia) SKA-Khabarovsk	Novogorsk
17:00	Karapuzov 14'; Makarov 82'		Fernández 30' (o.g.)	Stadium: VTB Novogorsk-Dynamo training ground

8 July 2023 BetBoom Brothers Cup	CSKA Moscow (Russia)	0–5	(Russia) Dynamo Moscow	Moscow
13:30			Gladyshev 26'; Budachev 31'; Zakharyan 60+2'; Taranchenko 61'; Mazurin 70'	Stadium: VTB Arena

9 July 2023 BetBoom Brothers Cup	Dynamo Moscow (Russia)	6–3	(Russia) CSKA Moscow	Moscow
16:30		Report		Stadium: VTB Arena
Note: Three periods of 30 minutes.

14 July 2023 Friendly	Dinamo Moscow (Russia)	1–0	(Russia) Nizhny Novgorod	Novogorsk
11:30	Gladyshev 6'	Report		Stadium: VTB Novogorsk-Dynamo training ground

14 July 2023 Friendly	Dinamo Moscow (Russia)	1–0	(Russia) Nizhny Novgorod	Novogorsk
17:00	Tyukavin 7'; Ngamaleu 12'; Dasa 32'; Smolov 38'	Report		Stadium: VTB Novogorsk-Dynamo training ground

23 January 2024 Friendly	Dinamo Moscow (Russia)	2–1	(Slovakia) Slovan Bratislava	Doha
17:00 AST (UTC+3)	Chávez 20'; Chupayov 39'	Report	Kankava 4'	Stadium: Doha Training Ground

25 January 2024 Friendly	Dinamo Moscow (Russia)	9–2	(Qatar) Al-Wakrah	Doha
11:00 AST (UTC+3)	Fomin 5'; Tyukavin 8', 25'; Gladyshev 12'; Babayev 20'; Smolov 39', 44'; Makarov 60'; Chupayov 77'	Report	Assal 32', 60'	Stadium: Doha Training Ground

== Competitions ==
=== Overall record ===
Competition	First match	Last match	Starting round	Final position	Record							
Competition	First match	Last match	Starting round	Final position	Pld	W	D	L	GF	GA	GD	Win %
Russian Premier League	22 July 2023	25 May 2024	Matchday 1	3rd	30	16	8	6	53	39	+14	53.33
Russian Cup	26 July 2023	1 May 2024	Group stage	Semi-finals	6	2	2	2	10	11	−1	33.33
Total					36	18	10	8	63	50	+13	50.00

Last updated: 5 June 2024
Source: Soccerway

=== Russian Premier League ===
==== League table ====
Pos	Team	Pld	W	D	L	GF	GA	GD	Pts
1	Zenit Saint Petersburg (C)	30	17	6	7	52	27	+25	57
2	Krasnodar	30	16	8	6	45	29	+16	56 (Note: Krasnodar is ahead of Dynamo on head-to-head points: Krasnodar 6, Dynamo 0)
3	Dynamo Moscow	30	16	8	6	53	39	+14	56
4	Lokomotiv Moscow	30	14	11	5	52	38	+14	53
5	Spartak Moscow	30	14	8	8	41	32	+9	50

Source: Premier Liga
Rules for classification: 1) Points; 2) Head-to-head points; 3) Head-to-head matches won; 4) Head-to-head goal difference; 5) Head-to-head goals scored; 6) Matches won; 7) Goal difference; 8) Goals scored; 9) 2022–23 position (not applicable to final standings); 10) Play-off. Note: if teams tied on points played an equal number of head-to-head games, head-to-head results are considered in aggregate, in a separate 'table'. If teams tied on points played a different number of head-to-head games, head-to-head criteria are considered in one-on-one pairs for each team against each other, then the teams are ordered by the number of one-on-one matchups they have advantage in.
(C) Champions

==== Results summary ====
Overall								Home						Away					
Pld	W	D	L	GF	GA	GD	Pts	W	D	L	GF	GA	GD	W	D	L	GF	GA	GD
30	16	8	6	53	39	+14	56	10	2	3	25	16	+9	6	6	3	28	23	+5

Last updated: 5 June 2024.
Source: Soccerway

==== Results by round ====
Round	1	2	3	4	5	6	7	8	9	10	11	12	13	14	15	16	17	18	19	20	21	22	23	24	25	26	27	28	29	30	31
Ground	H	A	A	H	H	A	A	H	A	A	H	A	H	A	H	A	H	A	H	H	H	H	A	A	A	H	A	H	A	H	A
Result	L	D	W	W	W	D	W	D	L	D	D	D	W	D	W	W	W	D	W	W	L	L	L	W	W	W	W	W	L		
Position	14	12	8	7	3	5	2	4	5	7	6	7	5	5	3	3	3	3	3	3	3	3	3	3	3	3	3	1	3		

Updated to match(es) played on 5 June 2024. Source:
A = Away; H = Home; W = Win; D = Draw; L = Loss

==== Matches ====
The league fixtures were unveiled on 24 June 2023.

21 July 2023 1	Dynamo Moscow	1–3	Krasnodar	Moscow
19:00 MSK (UTC+3)	Fernández (yellow card) 55'; Smolov 61'	Report	Córdoba 27', (yellow card) 72'; Chernikov 35'; Batxi 53'	Stadium: VTB Arena; Attendance: 9,612; Referee: Kirill Levnikov

29 July 2023 2	Krylia Sovetov Samara	3–3	Dynamo Moscow	Samara
16:00 SAMT (UTC+4)	Costanza 35'; Rahmanović (yellow card) 45+3'; Evgenyev (yellow card) 52'; Bijl 74'; Khubulov (yellow card) 84'; Garré 90+1' (pen.)	Report	Zakharyan 8'; Fomin (yellow card) 15'; Tyukavin 30'; Marichal (yellow card) 37'; Smolov 39'	Stadium: Solidarnost Arena; Attendance: 6,189; Referee: Artem Lyubimov

6 August 2023 3	Zenit Saint Petersburg	2–3	Dynamo Moscow	Saint Petersburg
15:00 MSK (UTC+3)	Balbuena 10' (o.g.); Eraković (yellow card) 79'; Sergeev 90'; Barrios (red card) 90+4'	Report	Tyukavin 2', 33'; Makarov (yellow card) 41'; Grulev 90+6'; Smolov (yellow card) 90+7'	Stadium: Krestovsky Stadium; Attendance: 24,672; Referee: Aleksey Amelin

13 August 2023 4	Dynamo Moscow	2–0	Baltika Kaliningrad	Moscow
15:00 MSK (UTC+3)	Bessmertniy 55'; Makarov 75'; Gladyshev (yellow card) 89'	Report		Stadium: VTB Arena; Attendance: 7,684; Referee: Vladimir Moskalev

19 August 2023 5	Dynamo Moscow	2–1	CSKA Moscow	Moscow
15:00 MSK (UTC+3)	Ngamaleu (yellow card) 34', (goal) 46'; Smolov (yellow card) 77', (goal) 83'	Report	Zabolotniy 6'; Willyan (yellow card) 41'	Stadium: VTB Arena; Attendance: 18,584; Referee: Kukuyan Pavel Valerievich

26 August 2023 6	Rubin Kazan	2–2	Dynamo Moscow	Kazan
17:30 MSK (UTC+3)	Daku 45+1' (pen.); Vujacic (yellow card) 90+1'; Fameyeh 90+5'	Report	Marichal (yellow card) 44' (yellow-red card) 56'; Laxalt (yellow card) 45+2'; Makarov 59', (yellow card) 63'; Skopintsev 74'	Stadium: Kazan Arena; Attendance: 6,948; Referee: Sergey Karasev

3 September 2023 7	Rostov	1–2	Dynamo Moscow	Rostov-on-Don
20:00 MSK (UTC+3)	Komlichenko (yellow card) 2'; Tugarev (yellow card) 21' (yellow-red card) 34'; Melekhin (yellow card) 74'; Grulev 90' (o.g.)	Report	Makarov 10', (yellow card) 22'; Laxalt (yellow card) 29'; Ngamaleu 42'; Shunin (yellow card) 90+5'	Stadium: Rostov Arena; Attendance: 11,001; Referee: Vasili Kazartsev

15 September 2023 8	Dynamo Moscow	1–1	Nizhny Novgorod	Moscow
19:00 MSK (UTC+3)	Smolov 8'; Dasa (yellow card) 37'; Chávez (yellow card) 90+6'	Report	Gotsuk (yellow card) 8'; Kakkoev (yellow card) 15'; Maïga (yellow card) 49'; Stamatov (yellow card) 83'; Kutateladze 88'	Stadium: VTB Arena; Attendance: 9,287; Referee: Yevgeni Kukulyak

23 September 2023 9	Spartak Moscow	1–0	Dynamo Moscow	Moscow
15:00 MSK (UTC+3)	Bongonda 7'; Maksimenko (yellow card) 84'; Denisov (yellow card) 87'; Sobolev (yellow card) 90+6'	Report	Chávez (yellow card) 90+2'	Stadium: Otkritie Arena; Attendance: 19,025; Referee: Pavel Kukuyan

1 October 2023 10	Akhmat Grozny	1–1	Dynamo Moscow	Grozny
15:00 MSK (UTC+3)	Kovachev 21'; Berisha (yellow card) 40'; Todorović (yellow card) 40'; Shvets (yellow card) 43'	Report	Fernández 51'; Dasa (yellow card) 73'	Stadium: Akhmat-Arena; Attendance: 4,695; Referee: Artyom Chistyakov

8 October 2023 11	Dynamo Moscow	0–0	Fakel	Moscow
16:30 MSK (UTC+3)	Balbuena (yellow card) 50'; Fernández (yellow card) 54'; Fomin (yellow card) 70'; Lesovoy (yellow card) 90+4'	Report		Stadium: VTB Arena; Attendance: 26,121; Referee: Yevgeni Bulanov

21 October 2023 12	Lokomotiv Moscow	0–0	Dynamo Moscow	Moscow
16:30 MSK (UTC+3)		Report		Stadium: RZD Arena; Attendance: 27,084; Referee: Sergey Ivanov

29 October 2023 13	Dynamo Moscow	2–1	Ural	Moscow
16:30 MSK (UTC+3)	Makarov (yellow card) 24'; Tyukavin 42'; Bitello 61'; Chávez (yellow card) 90+1'; Fernández (yellow card) 90+6'	Report	Ayupov (yellow card) 26'; Ishkov 90+5'	Stadium: VTB Arena; Attendance: 26,121; Referee: Sergey Cheban

6 November 2023 14	Sochi	3–3	Dynamo Moscow	Yekaterinburg
21:30 YEKT (UTC+5)	Burmistrov 24'; Kramarič (yellow card) 31'; Đorđević 38', 62'; Drkušić (yellow card) 60', (goal) 73'; Litvinov (yellow card) 89'; Marcelo (yellow card) 90+2' (yellow-red card) 90+6'	Report	Chávez 26'; Tyukavin 42'; Gladyshev 44'	Stadium: Central Stadium; Attendance: 4,200; Referee: Vladislav Bezborodov

12 November 2023 15	Dynamo Moscow	2–0	Orenburg	Moscow
16:30 MSK (UTC+3)	Chávez (yellow card) 55', (goal) 67'; Tyukavin 59'	Report	Gojković (yellow card) 73'	Stadium: VTB Arena; Attendance: 7,298; Referee: Pavel Shadykhanov

25 November 2023 16	CSKA Moscow	2–3	Dynamo Moscow	Moscow
17:30 MSK (UTC+3)	Fayzullaev 23'; Zabolotnyi 40'; Willyan (yellow card) 77'	Report	Bitello 7', 54'; Fernández (yellow card) 58'; Balbuena (yellow card) 62'; Konstantin Tyukavin 74'; Laxalt (yellow card) 83'; Leshchuk (yellow card) 90+3'	Stadium: VEB Arena; Attendance: 8,423; Referee: Sergei Karasev

4 December 2023 17	Dynamo Moscow	1–0	Rubin Kazan	Moscow
19:30 MSK (UTC+3)	Konstantin Tyukavin 26'	Report	Martynovich (yellow card) 2'	Stadium: VTB Arena; Attendance: 5,138; Referee: Sergei Tsyganok

10 December 2023 18	Fakel	1–1	Dynamo Moscow	Voronezh
14:00 MSK (UTC+3)	Kvekveskiri (yellow card) 23'; Maksimov 79' (pen.)	Report	Carrascal (yellow card) 23'; Gladyshev 29'; Skopintsev (yellow card) 59'; Balbuena (yellow card) 79'	Stadium: Tsentralnyi Profsoyuz Stadion; Attendance: 6,254; Referee: Rafael Shafeev

3 March 2024 19	Dynamo Moscow	2–1	Lokomotiv Moscow	Moscow
16:00 MSK (UTC+3)	Bitello 12'; Laxalt (yellow card) 26'; Makarov 58'; Balbuena (yellow card) 83'; Fernández (yellow card) 87'	Report	Morozov (yellow card) 30'; Silyanov (yellow card) 64'; Samoshnikov (yellow card) 72'; Zhemaletdinov 85'; Nyamsi (yellow card) 90+3'	Stadium: VTB Arena; Attendance: 14,170; Referee: Kirill Levnikov

9 March 2024 20	Dynamo Moscow	2–0	Akhmat Grozny	Moscow
19:00 MSK (UTC+3)	Chávez 39'; Marichal (yellow card) 57'; Tyukavin 62'	Report	Kharin (yellow card) 41' (yellow-red card) 45+1'; Ghandri (yellow card) 56'	Stadium: VTB Arena; Attendance: 7,862; Referee: Yevgeni Bulanov

29 March 2024 21	Dynamo Moscow	1–4	Rostov	Moscow
19:30 MSK (UTC+3)	Bitello 79'; Ngamaleu (yellow card) 85'	Report	Shchetinin 22'; Glebov 32'; Mohebi 42', 57'; Ronaldo (yellow card) 52'; Komarov (yellow card) 85'	Stadium: VTB Arena; Attendance: 8,052; Referee: Pavel Kukuyan

7 April 2024 22	Dynamo Moscow	1–2	Spartak Moscow	Moscow
19:30 MSK (UTC+3)	Chávez 5' (pen.); Smolov (yellow card) 77'	Report	Medina (yellow card) 54'; Umyarov (yellow card) 56'; Sobolev (yellow card) 57', (goal) 74', 87'; Klassen (yellow card) 86'	Stadium: VTB Arena; Attendance: 18,072; Referee: Kirill Levnikov

14 April 2024 23	Ural	2–1	Dynamo Moscow	Yekaterinburg
16:15 YEKT (UTC+5)	Miškić 10'; Ishkov (yellow card) 18'; Egorychev (yellow card) 73'; Kulakov (yellow card) 74'; Kashtanov (yellow card) 90+3' (red card) 90+6', (goal) 90+5'; Cissé (yellow card) 90+8'; Sungalutin (yellow card) 90+9'	Report	Tyukavin 34'; Marichal (yellow card) 42'; Carrascal (yellow card) 54'; Laxalt (yellow card) 80'	Stadium: Yekaterinburg Arena; Attendance: 9,545; Referee: Vasily Kazartsev

21 April 2024 24	Nizhny Novgorod	1–4	Dynamo Moscow	Nizhny Novgorod
14:00 MSK (UTC+3)	Tikhiy (yellow card) 16'; Kalinski 90+1'	Report	Tyukavin 31'; Fomin 44'; Fernández 57'; Bitello 66'	Stadium: Nizhny Novgorod Stadium; Attendance: 9,736; Referee: Artem Chistyakov

24 April 2024 25	Orenburg	1–2	Dynamo Moscow	Orenburg
18:00 YEKT (UTC+5)	Pérez (yellow card) 16'; Ghorbani (yellow card) 75'; Mansilla 77'; Malykh (yellow card) 86'	Report	Tyukavin 55'; Ngamaleu 72'	Stadium: Gazovik Stadium; Referee: Yevgeni Bulanov

28 April 2024 26	Dynamo Moscow	1–0	Zenit Saint Petersburg	Moscow
19:15 MSK (UTC+3)	Tyukavin 77'; Smolov (yellow card) 90'	Report		Stadium: VTB Arena; Attendance: 17,071; Referee: Pavel Kukuyan

5 May 2024 27	Dynamo Moscow	3–2	Sochi	Moscow
15:30 MSK (UTC+3)	Balbuena (yellow card) 13'; Tyukavin 53'; Bitello 85', (yellow card) 86'; Ngamaleu 90+5'	Report	Chistyakov (yellow card) 57'; Guarirapa 83'; Saavedra 90'	Stadium: VTB Arena; Attendance: 8,240; Referee: Artem Chistyakov

11 May 2024 28	Baltika	2–3	Dynamo Moscow	Kaliningrad
20:30 EET (UTC+2)	Henriquez 32'; kaplenko 68'	Report	Tyukavin 3'; Skopintsev (yellow card) 57'; Ngamaelu (yellow card) 71', (goal) 90+9'; Laxalt (yellow card) 81'; Fomin (yellow card) 87'; Fernández 90+3'	Stadium: Rostec Arena; Attendance: 13,478; Referee: Yevgeni Bulanov

18 May 2024 29	Dynamo Moscow	4-1	Krylya Sovetov Samara	Moscow
14:00 MSK (UTC+3)	Chávez (yellow card) 11'; Balbuena 29'; Fernández (yellow card) 47'; Balbuena 58'; Bitello 76'; Ngamaelu 90+2'	Report	Rasskazov (yellow card) 17'; Gorshkov 40'; Rahmanović (yellow card) 45+2'; Saltykov (yellow card) 49'	Stadium: VTB Arena; Attendance: 20,608; Referee: Pavel Kukuyan

25 May 2024 30	Krasnodar	1-0	Dynamo Moscow	Krasnodar
16:30 MSK (UTC+3)	Chernikov (yellow card) 8'; Córdoba 52'; Olaza (yellow card) 54'; Krivtsov (yellow card) 74'	Report	Laxalt (yellow card) 28'; Fernández (yellow card) 70'; Parshivlyuk (yellow card) 87' (yellow-red card) 88'	Stadium: Krasnodar Stadium; Attendance: 34,032; Referee: Sergei Karasev

=== Russian Cup ===
==== Group stage ====
Pos	Team	Pld	W	PW	PL	L	GF	GA	GD	Pts	Qualification
1	Spartak Moscow	6	4	0	0	2	16	12	+4	12	Qualification to the Knockout phase (RPL path)
2	Dynamo Moscow	6	3	0	2	1	12	10	+2	11 (Note: Head-to-head points: Dynamo 4, Krasnodar 2.)	Qualification to the Knockout phase (RPL path)
3	Krasnodar	6	3	1	0	2	12	9	+3	11	Qualification to the Knockout phase (regions path)
4	Pari Nizhny Novgorod	6	0	1	0	5	6	15	−9	2	

Source: Russian Football Union (in Russian), Soccerway
Rules for classification: 1) Points; 2) Head-to-head points; 3) Head-to-head matches won; 4) Head-to-head goal difference; 5) Head-to-head goals scored; 6) Matches won; 7) Goal difference; 8) Goals scored; 9) Penalty shoot-out goal difference; 10) Draw.
Notes:

25 July 2023 1	Nizhny Novgorod	1 – 1 (4–3 p)	Dynamo Moscow	Nizhny Novgorod
18:30 MSK (UTC+3)	Sevikyan 7'; Aleksandrov (yellow card) 56'; Tikhiy (yellow card) 57'	Report	Gladyshev 9'; Bessmertniy (yellow card) 70'	Stadium: Nizhny Novgorod Stadium; Attendance: 9,846; Referee: Roman Galimov
	Penalties
	Aleksandrov (penalty scored); Suleymanov (penalty scored); Zhigulev (penalty scored); Yuldoshev (penalty scored)		Tyukavin (penalty scored); Makarov (penalty missed); Zakharyan (penalty scored); Karapuzov (penalty scored); Parshivlyuk (penalty missed)

7 August 2023 2	Dynamo Moscow	4–3	Krasnodar	Moscow
20:45 MSK (UTC+3)	Fomin 31' (pen.), (yellow card) 88'; Grulev 35', 67'; Fernández (yellow card) 79'; Ngamaleu (yellow card) 82'; Zakharyan 90+6'	Report	Agkatsev (yellow card) 30'; Krivtsov 41'; Akhmetov 45'; Cobnan 47'; Córdoba 77'	Stadium: VTB Arena; Attendance: 14,259; Referee: Yevgeni Bulanov

29 August 2023 3	Spartak Moscow	4–1	Dynamo Moscow	Moscow
19:30 MSK (UTC+3)	Sobolev 6', 18'; Babić 15'; Zinkovskiy 25'; Medina (yellow card) 68'; Reabciuk (yellow card) 76'	Report	Parshivlyuk (yellow card) 14'; Lesovoy (yellow card) 45+1'; Ngamaleu 65'; Carrascal (yellow card) 80'; Laxalt (yellow card) 86'; Gagnidze (yellow card) 90+3'	Stadium: Otkritie Arena; Attendance: 19,280; Referee: Vitali Meshkov

20 September 2023 4	Krasnodar	1–1 (4–2 p)	Dynamo Moscow	Krasnodar
19:00 MSK (UTC+3)	Kevin (yellow card) 61'; Kady 69'; Akhmetov (yellow card) 76'	Report	Carrascal (yellow card) 3'; Bitello 21'; Laxalt (yellow card) 72'; Balbuena (yellow card) 90+5'	Stadium: Krasnodar Stadium; Attendance: 14,455; Referee: Roman Safyan
	Penalties
	Kady (penalty scored); Koksharov (penalty scored); Chernikov (penalty scored); Batxi (penalty missed); Kevin (penalty scored)		Tyukavin (penalty missed); Smolov (penalty missed); Ngamaleu (penalty scored); Balbuena (penalty scored)

4 October 2023 5	Dynamo Moscow	3–0	Spartak Moscow	Moscow
19:00 MSK (UTC+3)	Marichal (yellow card) 31'; Bitello 42'; Fomin 45'; Zazvonkin 90+5'		Maslov (yellow card) 30'; Prutsev (yellow card) 48'; Chernov (yellow card) 71'	Stadium: VTB Arena; Attendance: 25,716; Referee: Vladimir Moskalev

2 November 2023 6	Dynamo Moscow	2–1	Nizhny Novgorod	Moscow
20:45 MSK (UTC+3)	Tyukavin 16'; Gladyshev 90+3'	Report	Sevikyan 13'; Boselli (yellow card) 85'	Stadium: VTB Arena; Attendance: 10,147; Referee: Ranel Ziyakov

==== Knockout phase ====
===== Quarter-finals =====
28 November 2023 RPL QF	Dynamo Moscow	1–0	Zenit Saint Petersburg	Moscow
18:15 MSK (UTC+3)	Carrascal (yellow card) 14' (yellow-red card) 69'; Parshivlyuk (yellow card) 39'; Balbuena (yellow card) 53'; Smolov 74'; Shunin (yellow card) 90+4'	Report	Santos (yellow card) 79'	Stadium: VTB Arena; Attendance: 17,831; Referee: Pavel Kukuyan

13 March 2024 RPL QF	Zenit Saint Petersburg	2–0 (2–1 agg.)	Dynamo Moscow	Saint Petersburg
20:15 MSK (UTC+3)	Cassierra 13', 21'; Fernandes (yellow card) 51'; Wendel (yellow card) 62'; Barrios (yellow card) 76'	Report	Laxalt (yellow card) 38'; Parshivlyuk (yellow card) 42'	Stadium: Gazprom Arena; Attendance: 45,407; Referee: Sergey Ivanov

2 April 2024 Regions QF 2	SKA-Khabarovsk	1–2	Dynamo Moscow	Saint Petersburg
17:30 MSK (UTC+3)	Gongapshev 69'	Report	Grulev 12'; Balbuena 74'	Stadium: Stadion Kirovets; Attendance: 1,057; Referee: Sergey Tsyganok

14 April 2024 Regions semi-finals 1	Orenburg	2–4	Dynamo Moscow	Orenburg
19:00 YEKT (UTC+5)	Ghorbani 68'; Florentín (yellow card) 90+1'; Thompson 90+2'	Report	Smolov 11'; Tyukavin 62'; Makarov 74'; Carrascal 82'; Ngamaleu (yellow card) 90'	Stadium: Gazovik Stadium; Attendance: 5,422; Referee: Pavel Kukuyan

1 May 2024 Regions semi-finals 2	Dynamo Moscow	0–2	Spartak Moscow	Moscow
18:00 MSK (UTC+3)	Smolov (yellow card) 56'; Carrascal (yellow card) 78'	Report	Sobolev 8'; Ignatov 39'; Prutsev (yellow card) 59'	Stadium: VTB Arena; Attendance: 25,512; Referee: Patrick Suchy
