= Gladyshev =

Gladyshev (masculine, Russian: Гладышев) or Gladysheva (feminine, Russian: Гладышева) is a Russian surname. Notable people with the surname include:

- Aleksei Gladyshev (born 1992), Russian soccer player
- Anatoly Gladyshev (1947–1984), Russian ice speedway rider
- Artur Gladyshev (born 1968), Russian singer
- Svetlana Gladysheva (born 1971), Russian alpine skier
- Vadim Gladyshev (born 1976), Russian soccer manager and former player, father of Yaroslav
- Yaroslav Gladyshev (born 2003), Russian soccer player, son of Vadim
