= Bitello =

Brazilian footballer (born 2000)

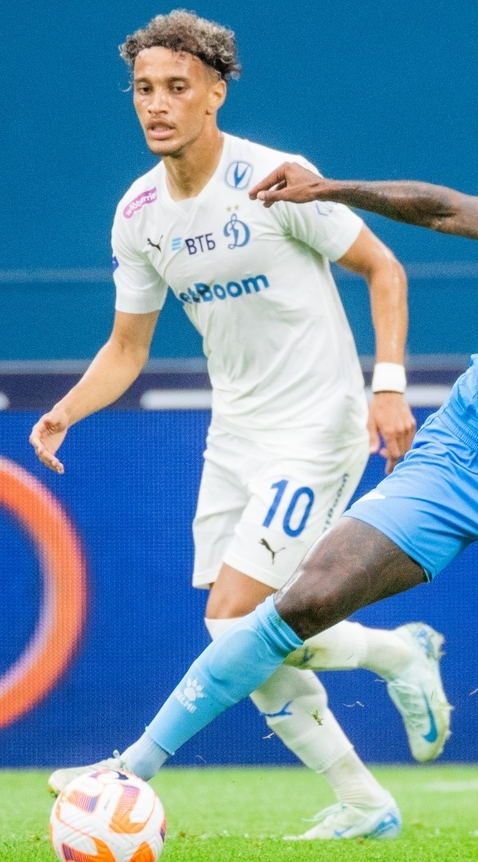
- Bitello with Dynamo Moscow in 2024

Personal information
- Full name: João Paulo de Souza Mares
- Date of birth: 7 January 2000 (age 26)
- Place of birth: Formosa do Oeste, Brazil
- Height: 1.78 m (5 ft 10 in)
- Position: Midfielder

Team information
- Current team: Dynamo Moscow
- Number: 10

Youth career
- 2017–2018: Cascavel
- 2018–2021: Grêmio

Senior career*
Years	Team	Apps	(Gls)
2017–2018	Cascavel	3	(0)
2021–2023	Grêmio	93	(19)
2023–	Dynamo Moscow	91	(17)

International career^{‡}
2023	Brazil U23	1	(0)
- * Club domestic league appearances and goals as of 22 November 2026 ‡ National team caps and goals as of 7 September 2023

João Paulo de Souza Mares (born 7 January 2000), commonly known as Bitello, is a Brazilian professional footballer who plays as a midfielder and winger for Russian club Dynamo Moscow.

== Career ==
Born in Formosa do Oeste, Brazil, Bitello joined the Grêmio's Academy at the age of 18 in 2018. In 2023, after promising performances in the 2022 Series B (Second Division of the Brazilian Football Championship) for Gremio, Bitello returned in 2023, being one of the pillars of the team, one of the players who played the most games for Gremio in the year. On 12 September 2023, Bitello accepts a proposal of 10 million euros from Dynamo Moscow.

On 14 September 2023, Bitello signed a five-year contract with Dynamo Moscow. In the 2024–25 season, Bitello was voted Player of the Season by Dynamo fans.

On 11 September 2025, Bitello extended his Dynamo contract to 2031.

== Career statistics ==
As of match played on 22 November 2026

Appearances and goals by club, season and competition
Club	Season	League			State League		National Cup		Continental		Other		Total	
Club	Season	Division	Apps	Goals	Apps	Goals	Apps	Goals	Apps	Goals	Apps	Goals	Apps	Goals
Cascavel	2017	Paranaense	—		0	0	—		—		3 (Note: Appearance(s) in Taça FPF.)	0	3	0
Cascavel	2018	Paranaense	—		3 (Note: Appearance(s) in Campeonato Paranaense.)	0	—		—		—		3	0
Cascavel	Total		—		3	0	—		—		3	0	6	0
Grêmio	2021	Série A	0	0	1 (Note: Appearance(s) in Campeonato Gaúcho.)	0	0	0	1 (Note: Appearance(s) in Copa Sudamericana.)	0	—		2	0
Grêmio	2022	Série B	36	8	11	2	1	0	—		—		48	10
Grêmio	2023	Série A	19	4	13	3	10	1	—		1 (Note: Appearance(s) in Recopa Gaúcha.)	1	43	9
Grêmio	Total		55	12	25	5	11	1	1	0	1	1	93	19
Dynamo Moscow	2023–24	Russian Premier League	23	8	—		7	2	—		—		30	10
Dynamo Moscow	2024–25	Russian Premier League	26	3	—		9	0	—		—		35	3
Dynamo Moscow	2025–26	Russian Premier League	27	6	—		10	0	—		—		37	6
Dynamo Moscow	2026–27	Russian Premier League	15	0	—		4	0	—		—		19	0
Dynamo Moscow	Total		91	17	—		30	2	—		—		121	19
Career total			146	29	28	5	41	3	1	0	4	1	220	38

== Honours ==
=== Club ===
Grêmio

- Campeonato Gaúcho: 2021, 2022, 2023
- Recopa Gaúcha: 2021, 2022, 2023

=== Individual ===
- Campeonato Gaúcho best player: 2023
