= Denis Makarov =

Russian footballer (born 1998)

- Makarov with Dynamo Moscow in 2022

Personal information
- Full name: Denis Yevgenyevich Makarov
- Date of birth: 18 February 1998 (age 28)
- Place of birth: Tolyatti, Russia
- Height: 1.81 m (5 ft 11 in)
- Position: Right midfielder

Team information
- Current team: Krylia Sovetov Samara

Youth career
- 2003–2013: Konoplyov football academy
- 2013–2015: Impuls Tolyatti
- 2015: Yakutiya Yakutsk
- 2015–2016: Mordovia Saransk
- 2017: Orenburg

Senior career*
Years	Team	Apps	(Gls)
2017–2018	Orenburg-2	23	(5)
2018–2019	Neftekhimik	41	(18)
2020–2021	Rubin Kazan	38	(9)
2021–2025	Dynamo Moscow	89	(15)
2026	Kayserispor	13	(0)
2026–	Krylia Sovetov Samara	9	(0)

International career^{‡}
2020–2021	Russia U21	6	(1)
- * Club domestic league appearances and goals as of 20 November 2026 ‡ National team caps and goals as of 31 March 2021

Denis Yevgenyevich Makarov (Russian: Дени́с Евге́ньевич Мака́ров; born 18 February 1998) is a Russian professional footballer who plays as a right midfielder for Krylia Sovetov Samara.

== Club career ==
He made his debut in the Russian Professional Football League for Orenburg-2 on 27 July 2017 in a game against Chelyabinsk.

He made his Russian Football National League debut for Neftekhimik Nizhnekamsk on 7 July 2019 in a game against Mordovia Saransk.

On 6 January 2020 he signed a 3.5-year contract with Rubin Kazan. He made his Russian Premier League debut for Rubin on 1 March 2020 in a game against Tambov. He substituted Khvicha Kvaratskhelia in the 89th minute. He scored his first RPL goal on 5 July 2020 in a 1–0 victory over FC Orenburg.

On 6 August 2021, he signed a five-year contract with Dynamo Moscow. He was voted player of the month by Dynamo fans for December 2021.

On 27 January 2026, Makarov moved to Kayserispor in Turkey.

On 1 July 2026, Makarov signed a one-season contract with Krylia Sovetov Samara.

== International career ==
He represented Russia at the 2021 UEFA European Under-21 Championship, where they were eliminated at group stage. Makarov was included in the Squad of the Tournament.

On 11 May 2021, he was included in the preliminary extended 30-man Russia squad for UEFA Euro 2020. That was the first time he was called up to the senior national team. On 2 June 2021, he was included in the final squad. He did not appear in any games as Russia was eliminated at group stage.

== Career statistics ==
=== Club ===
As of match played 20 November 2026

Appearances and goals by club, season and competition
Club	Season	League			Cup		Europe		Total	
Club	Season	Division	Apps	Goals	Apps	Goals	Apps	Goals	Apps	Goals
Orenburg-2	2017–18	Russian Second League	23	5	—		—		23	5
Neftekhimik Nizhnekamsk	2018–19	Russian Second League	21	7	3	0	—		24	7
Neftekhimik Nizhnekamsk	2019–20	Russian First League	20	11	0	0	—		20	11
Neftekhimik Nizhnekamsk	Total		41	18	3	0	—		44	18
Rubin Kazan	2019–20	Russian Premier League	9	2	—		—		9	2
Rubin Kazan	2020–21	Russian Premier League	28	7	2	2	—		30	9
Rubin Kazan	2021–22	Russian Premier League	1	0	—		0	0	1	0
Rubin Kazan	Total		38	9	2	2	0	0	40	11
Dynamo Moscow	2021–22	Russian Premier League	24	3	6	2	—		30	5
Dynamo Moscow	2022–23	Russian Premier League	25	4	8	2	—		33	6
Dynamo Moscow	2023–24	Russian Premier League	21	4	5	1	—		26	5
Dynamo Moscow	2024–25	Russian Premier League	11	1	9	2	—		20	3
Dynamo Moscow	2025–26	Russian Premier League	8	3	4	0	—		12	3
Dynamo Moscow	Total		89	15	32	7	—		121	22
Kayserispor	2025–26	Süper Lig	13	0	—		—		13	0
Krylia Sovetov Samara	2026–27	Russian Premier League	9	0	4	1	—		13	1
Career total			213	47	41	10	0	0	254	57

== Honours ==
=== Individual ===
- UEFA European Under-21 Championship Team of the Tournament: 2021
- Russian Professional Football League Zone Ural-Privolzhye best young player (2018–19).
- Russian Premier League Goal of the Season: 2020–21 (Rubin 2–1 Zenit, 8 March 2021)
- Russian Premier League Goal of the Month: September 2022 (Dynamo 2–1 Ural, 3 September 2022)
