= Andrey Kudravets =

Belarusian footballer

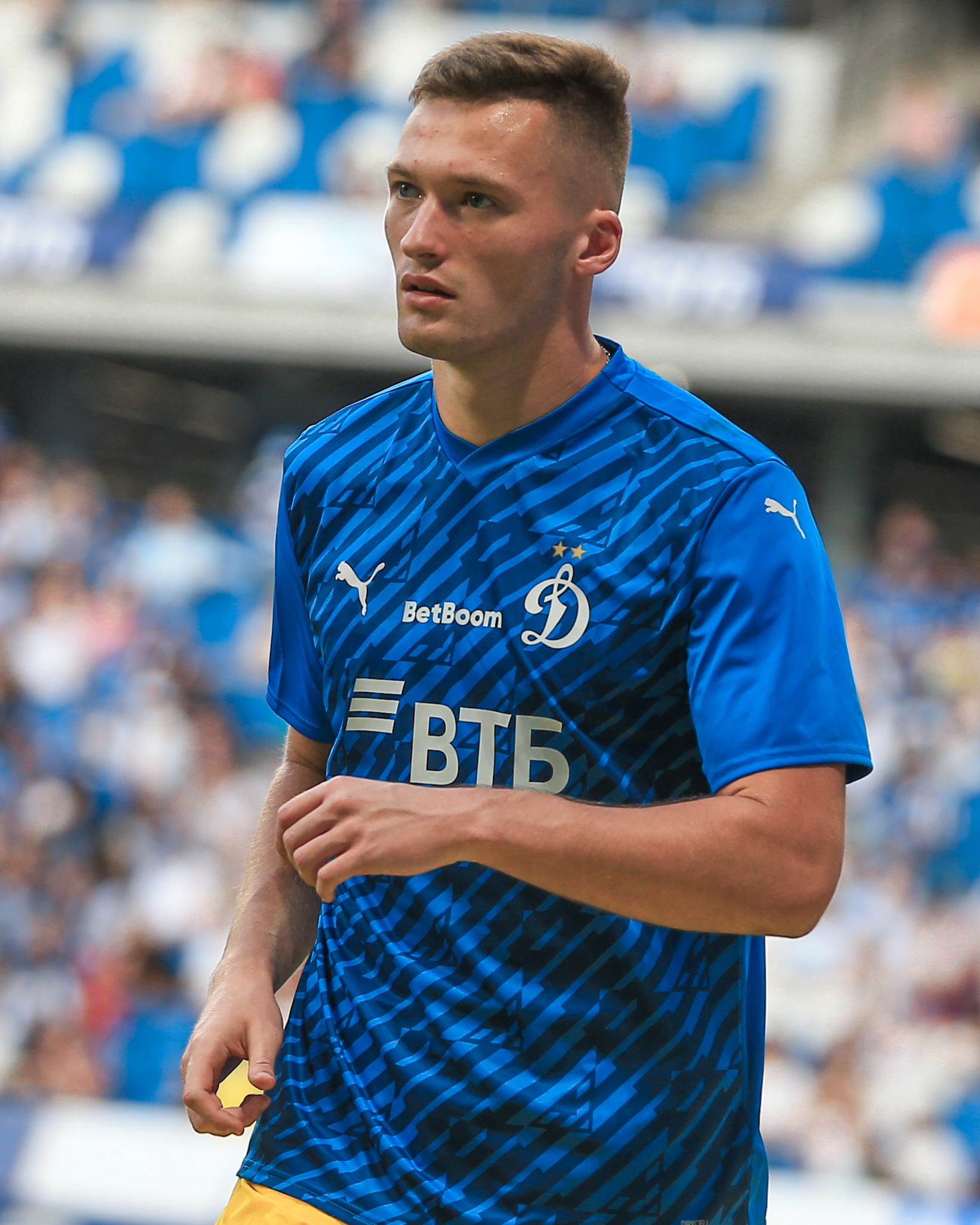

Personal information
- Full name: Andrey Ruslanovich Kudravets
- Date of birth: 2 September 2003 (age 23)
- Place of birth: Borisov, Minsk Oblast, Belarus
- Height: 1.91 m (6 ft 3 in)
- Position: Goalkeeper

Team information
- Current team: Dinamo Minsk (on loan from Dynamo Moscow)
- Number: 47

Youth career
- 2018–2021: BATE Borisov

Senior career*
Years	Team	Apps	(Gls)
2020–2023	BATE Borisov	52	(0)
2023–	Dynamo Moscow	0	(0)
2023	→ BATE Borisov (loan)	7	(0)
2024–	Dynamo-2 Moscow	29	(0)
2026–	→ Dinamo Minsk (loan)	5	(0)

International career
2019	Belarus U17	3	(0)
2021	Belarus U19	2	(0)
2022	Belarus U21	1	(0)
2022–2023	Belarus	2	(0)
- * Club domestic league appearances and goals as of 6 September 2026

Andrey Ruslanovich Kudravets (Belarusian: Андрэй Русланавіч Кудравец; Russian: Андрей Русланович Кудравец; born 2 September 2003) is a Belarusian professional footballer who plays for Dinamo Minsk on loan from Russian Premier League club Dynamo Moscow. He has also appeared for the Belarus national team and the U17, U19 and U21 Belarusian teams.

== Club career ==
On 18 August 2023, Kudravets signed a five-year contract with Russian Premier League club Dynamo Moscow and was loaned back to BATE Borisov until the end of 2023.

Kudravets made his competitive debut for Dynamo on 15 August 2024 in a Russian Cup game against Dynamo Makhachkala.

On 10 August 2026, he was loaned to Dinamo Minsk until the summer of 2027.

== Career statistics ==
=== Club ===
As of match played 25 July 2026

Appearances and goals by club, season and competition
Club	Season	League			Cup		Europe		Other		Total	
Club	Season	Division	Apps	Goals	Apps	Goals	Apps	Goals	Apps	Goals	Apps	Goals
BATE Borisov	2020	Belarusian Premier League	0	0	3	0	0	0	—		3	0
BATE Borisov	2021	Belarusian Premier League	13	0	5	0	0	0	1 (Note: Appearance in Belarusian Super Cup)	0	19	0
BATE Borisov	2022	Belarusian Premier League	25	0	5	0	2 (Note: Appearance(s) in UEFA Europa Conference League)	0	0	0	32	0
BATE Borisov	2023	Belarusian Premier League	14	0	5	0	5 (Note: Four appearances in UEFA Champions League, one appearance in UEFA Europa League)	0	0	0	24	0
BATE Borisov	Total		52	0	18	0	7	0	1	0	78	0
Dynamo Moscow	2023–24	Russian Premier League	0	0	0	0	—		—		0	0
Dynamo Moscow	2024–25	Russian Premier League	0	0	1	0	—		—		1	0
Dynamo Moscow	Total		0	0	1	0	—		—		1	0
BATE Borisov (loan)	2023	Belarusian Premier League	7	0	0	0	2	0	—		9	0
Dynamo-2 Moscow	2023–24	Russian Second League B	8	0	—		—		—		8	0
Dynamo-2 Moscow	2024–25	Russian Second League A	8	0	—		—		—		8	0
Dynamo-2 Moscow	2025–26	Russian Second League A	12	0	—		—		—		12	0
Dynamo-2 Moscow	2026–27	Russian Second League A	1	0	—		—		—		1	0
Dynamo-2 Moscow	Total		29	0	—		—		—		29	0
Career total			88	0	19	0	9	0	1	0	117	0

=== International ===
Appearances and goals by national team and year
National team	Year	Apps	Goals
Belarus	2022	1	0
Belarus	2023	1	0
Total		2	0

== Honours ==
BATE Borisov

- Belarusian Cup winner: 2020–21
- Belarusian Super Cup winner: 2022
