= Konstantin Tyukavin =

Russian footballer (born 2002)

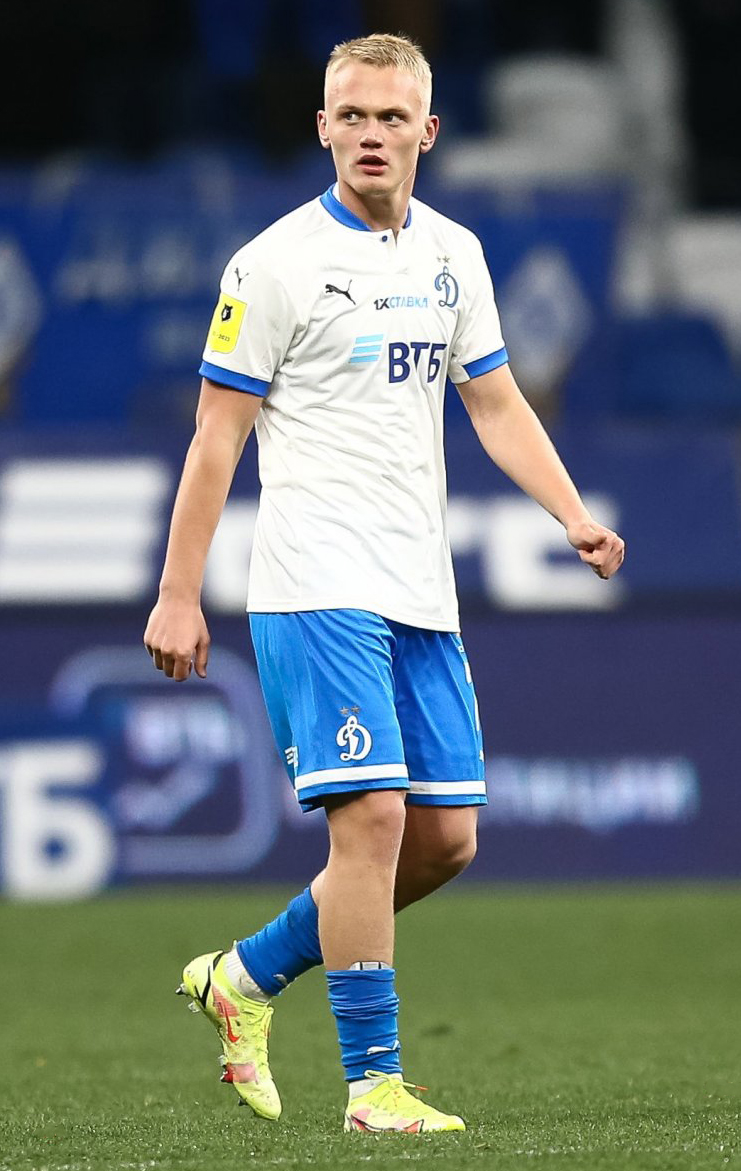
- Tyukavin with Dynamo Moscow in 2021

Personal information
- Full name: Konstantin Aleksandrovich Tyukavin
- Date of birth: 22 June 2002 (age 24)
- Place of birth: Kotlas, Russia
- Height: 1.78 m (5 ft 10 in)
- Position: Forward

Team information
- Current team: Dynamo Moscow
- Number: 70

Youth career
- 2009–2019: Dynamo Moscow

Senior career*
Years	Team	Apps	(Gls)
2020–2021	Dynamo-2 Moscow	11	(6)
2020–	Dynamo Moscow	157	(57)

International career^{‡}
2017	Russia U16	4	(0)
2019	Russia U18	6	(0)
2021–2022	Russia U21	12	(6)
2021–	Russia	14	(3)
- * Club domestic league appearances and goals as of 22 November 2026 ‡ National team caps and goals as of 17 November 2026

Konstantin Aleksandrovich Tyukavin (Russian: Константин Александрович Тюкавин; born 22 June 2002) is a Russian football player who plays as a striker or second striker for Dynamo Moscow and Russia national team.

== Club career ==
He made his debut in the Russian Premier League for Dynamo Moscow on 1 November 2020 in a game against Tambov. He made his first start in their next game against Lokomotiv Moscow on 8 November.

On 20 February 2021, he scored his first goal for Dynamo in a 2–0 victory over Spartak Moscow in a Russian Cup game.

On 18 March 2021, he came on as a substitute in the 55th minute in the away game against Krasnodar, with Dynamo down 0–2. 11 minutes later he scored his first RPL goal for Dynamo that equalized the score, and in the 81st minute he scored the winning goal that established the final score of 3–2 for Dynamo. He was selected as player of the match. In Dynamo's next league game on 3 April 2021 against Ufa, Tyukavin scored a goal, assisted on another, and another Dynamo goal was scored on a rebound tap-in after the ball hit the goalpost after Tyukavin's header, as Dynamo won 4–0. He was selected as player of the match again. In the next game on 11 April 2021 against Ural Yekaterinburg, he assisted on both Dynamo goals in a 2–2 draw. Dynamo fans voted him Player of the Month for April 2021.

On 18 June 2021, he extended his contract with Dynamo for 3 additional seasons with an option for another season.

On 20 August 2022, Tyukavin scored the only goal of the game in an oldest Russian derby game against Spartak Moscow, securing the first Dynamo home league victory in this derby since 2008. He was selected as Player of the Month by Dynamo fans for May/June 2023. He was voted as Player of the Season for the 2022–23 season by the fans.

On 1 December 2023, he extended his Dynamo contract to summer 2028. He was selected as player of the month for November and December 2023 games by Dynamo fans and by the Russian Premier League. He was selected as player of the month for the second time in the season for April 2024 games.

On 26 May 2024, Tyukavin was named by the league as player of the season, forward of the season and his backheel rabona goal against Sochi on 5 May 2024 was named goal of the season. He was also voted Dynamo player of the month for May. On 12 June 2024, he was chosen as Footballer of the Year in Russia in a traditional poll taken among the league players.

On 2 March 2025 in Dynamo's first game after the three-month-long winter break, Tyukavin suffered an ACL tear and was expected to be out of commission for approximately six months.

On 28 May 2025, Tyukavin extended his Dynamo contract to June 2030.

He returned to play after his injury on 13 September 2025.

== International career ==
On 20 March 2021, he was called up to the Russia U21 squad for the 2021 UEFA European Under-21 Championship.

He was called up to the Russia national football team for the first time for World Cup qualifiers against Croatia, Cyprus and Malta in September 2021. He made his debut on 4 September 2021 against Cyprus, substituting Fyodor Smolov in the 75th minute of a 2–0 away victory.

== Personal life ==
His father Aleksandr Tyukavin is a legendary bandy player who won the Bandy World Championship 8 times and Russian Bandy Super League 16 times, including seven times with Dynamo Moscow.

== Career statistics ==
=== Club ===
As of match played 22 November 2026

Appearances and goals by club, season and competition
Club	Season	League			Russian Cup		Total	
Club	Season	Division	Apps	Goals	Apps	Goals	Apps	Goals
Dynamo-2 Moscow	2020–21	Russian Second League	11	6	—		11	6
Dynamo Moscow	2020–21	Russian Premier League	15	3	2	1	17	4
Dynamo Moscow	2021–22	Russian Premier League	30	6	6	3	36	9
Dynamo Moscow	2022–23	Russian Premier League	28	9	10	1	38	10
Dynamo Moscow	2023–24	Russian Premier League	30	15	8	2	38	17
Dynamo Moscow	2024–25	Russian Premier League	19	7	3	1	22	8
Dynamo Moscow	2025–26	Russian Premier League	22	10	9	3	31	13
Dynamo Moscow	2026–27	Russian Premier League	13	7	5	2	18	9
Dynamo Moscow	Total		157	57	43	13	200	70
Career total			168	63	43	13	211	76

=== International ===
As of match played 17 November 2026

Appearances and goals by national team and year
National team	Year	Apps	Goals
Russia	2021	1	0
Russia	2023	2	0
Russia	2024	3	1
Russia	2025	2	0
Russia	2026	6	2
Total		14	3

==== International goals ====
Scores and results list Russia's goal tally first.

No.	Date	Venue	Opponent	Score	Result	Competition
1	7 June 2024	Dinamo Stadium, Minsk, Belarus	Belarus	2–0	4–0	Friendly
2	27 March 2026	Krasnodar Stadium, Krasnodar, Russia	Nicaragua	2–1	3–1	Friendly
3	3 October 2026	Yekaterinburg Arena, Yekaterinburg, Russia	Namibia	3–0	6–0	Friendly

== Honours ==
Individual

- Russian Premier League Player of the Month: November/December 2023, April 2024, April 2026.
- Russian Premier League Goal of the Month: September 2024 (second goal on 22 September against Spartak Moscow).
- Russian Premier League Player of the Season: 2023–24
- Russian Premier League Forward of the Season: 2023–24
- Russian Premier League Goal of the Season: 2023–24 (vs. Sochi on 5 May 2024)
- Footballer of the Year in Russia: 2023–24.
- Sportsman of the Year in Russia, RB Award, 2025
