= Dmitri Skopintsev =

Russian footballer (born 1997)

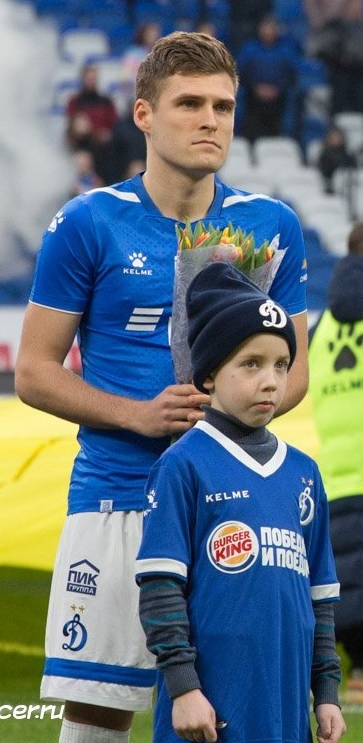
- Skopintsev with Dynamo Moscow in 2020

Personal information
- Full name: Dmitri Vladimirovich Skopintsev
- Date of birth: 2 March 1997 (age 29)
- Place of birth: Voronezh, Russia
- Height: 1.76 m (5 ft 9 in)
- Positions: Left-back; left midfielder

Team information
- Current team: Dynamo Moscow
- Number: 7

Youth career
- –2010: DYuSShOR-15 Voronezh
- 2010–2014: Dynamo Moscow
- 2014–2015: Zenit St. Petersburg
- 2015: RB Leipzig

Senior career*
Years	Team	Apps	(Gls)
2015–2016	Liefering	13	(0)
2016–2019	Rostov	26	(0)
2017	→ Baltika Kaliningrad (loan)	36	(11)
2019	Krasnodar	14	(2)
2020–	Dynamo Moscow	177	(6)

International career^{‡}
2011–2012	Russia U15	7	(0)
2011–2013	Russia U16	22	(1)
2013–2014	Russia U17	13	(0)
2014–2015	Russia U18	8	(0)
2015–2016	Russia U19	8	(0)
2017	Russia U21	1	(0)
- * Club domestic league appearances and goals as of 22 November 2026 ‡ National team caps and goals as of 12 September 2023

Dmitri Vladimirovich Skopintsev (Russian: Дми́трий Влади́мирович Ско́пинцев; born 2 March 1997) is a Russian football player who plays for FC Dynamo Moscow. He plays as a left back or left midfielder.

== Club career ==
Born in Voronezh, Skopintsev moved to Moscow as a child and began playing football in FC Dynamo Moscow's youth system. He also played youth football with FC Zenit St. Petersburg before moving to Austria where he played in FC Red Bull Salzburg's club system. Upon returning to Russia, Skopintsev signed with FC Rostov.

He made his debut for the FC Rostov main squad on 21 September 2016 in a Russian Cup game against FC Dynamo Moscow.

He made his Russian Premier League debut for FC Rostov on 29 October 2016 in a game against FC Amkar Perm.

He scored 10 goals for FC Baltika Kaliningrad where he played on loan in the first part of the 2017–18 season and during the winter break FC Rostov recalled him from loan.

On 20 February 2019, he signed a 4.5-year contract with FC Krasnodar.

On 7 January 2020, he returned to FC Dynamo Moscow, signing a 4.5-year contract. He reunited with Kirill Novikov, who coached him for 4 years while at Dynamo academy. In his third game for Dynamo on 13 March 2020, he scored the decisive third goal in the 3–2 away defeat of FC Akhmat Grozny.

On 8 August 2022, Skopintsev extended his contract with Dynamo to 2027. He was chosen by Dynamo fans as player of the month for November 2022.

== International career ==
Skopintsev was first called up to the Russia national football team for a training camp in September 2023. He made his debut on 12 September 2023 in a friendly against Qatar, which was not an official FIFA-approved game.

== Career statistics ==
=== Club ===
As of match played 22 November 2026

Appearances and goals by club, season and competition
Club	Season	League			Cup		Europe		Total	
Club	Season	Division	Apps	Goals	Apps	Goals	Apps	Goals	Apps	Goals
FC Liefering	2015–16	Austrian Football First League	13	0	—		—		13	0
FC Rostov	2016–17	Russian Premier League	1	0	1	0	0	0	2	0
FC Baltika Kaliningrad	2016–17	Russian First League	12	1	—		—		12	1
FC Baltika Kaliningrad	2017–18	Russian First League	24	10	1	0	—		25	10
FC Baltika Kaliningrad	Total		36	11	1	0	0	0	37	11
FC Rostov	2017–18	Russian Premier League	10	0	—		—		10	0
FC Rostov	2018–19	Russian Premier League	15	0	2	1	—		17	1
FC Rostov	Total		26	0	3	1	0	0	29	1
FC Krasnodar	2018–19	Russian Premier League	9	1	0	0	0	0	9	1
FC Krasnodar	2019–20	Russian Premier League	5	1	1	0	2 (Note: One appearance in UEFA Champions League, one appearance in UEFA Europa League)	0	8	1
FC Krasnodar	Total		14	2	1	0	2	0	17	2
FC Dynamo Moscow	2019–20	Russian Premier League	10	1	—		—		10	1
FC Dynamo Moscow	2020–21	Russian Premier League	24	1	1	0	1 (Note: Appearance in UEFA Europa League)	0	26	1
FC Dynamo Moscow	2021–22	Russian Premier League	27	1	6	1	—		33	2
FC Dynamo Moscow	2022–23	Russian Premier League	29	1	7	0	—		36	1
FC Dynamo Moscow	2023–24	Russian Premier League	29	1	7	0	—		36	1
FC Dynamo Moscow	2024–25	Russian Premier League	23	0	8	1	—		31	1
FC Dynamo Moscow	2025–26	Russian Premier League	25	0	11	1	—		36	1
FC Dynamo Moscow	2026–27	Russian Premier League	10	1	4	0	—		14	1
FC Dynamo Moscow	Total		177	6	44	3	1	0	222	9
Career total			266	19	49	4	3	0	318	23

== Honours ==
Individual

- Russian Premier League Goal of the Month: July/August 2023 (Rubin Kazan 1–2 Dynamo, 26 August 2023).
