= Nicolás Marichal =

Uruguayan footballer (born 2001)

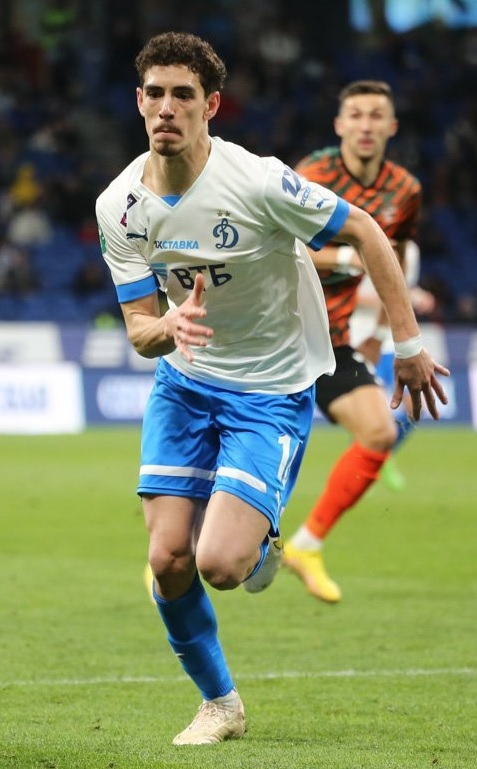
- Marichal with Dynamo Moscow in 2022

Personal information
- Full name: Nicolás Marichal Pérez
- Date of birth: 17 March 2001 (age 25)
- Place of birth: Sarandí del Yí, Uruguay
- Height: 1.85 m (6 ft 1 in)
- Position: Centre-back

Team information
- Current team: Dynamo Moscow
- Number: 2

Youth career
- Nacional de Sarandí del Yí
- Nacional

Senior career*
Years	Team	Apps	(Gls)
2021–2022	Nacional	45	(0)
2022–	Dynamo Moscow	90	(5)

International career^{‡}
2024	Uruguay U23	6	(0)
2024–	Uruguay	5	(0)
Medal record
Men's football
Representing Uruguay
Copa América
Third place	2024 United States
- * Club domestic league appearances and goals as of 24 October 2026 ‡ National team caps and goals as of 13 October 2025

Nicolás Marichal Pérez (born 17 March 2001) is a Uruguayan professional footballer who plays as a centre-back for Russian Premier League club Dynamo Moscow and the Uruguay national team.

== Club career ==
Marichal started his youth football career with Nacional de Sarandí del Yí and joined Nacional later. He made his professional debut for the club on 8 February 2021 in a 3–0 league win against River Plate Montevideo.

On 30 August 2022, Marichal signed a five-year contract with Russian Premier League club FC Dynamo Moscow. On 10 December 2024, his contract with Dynamo was extended until June 2029.

== International career ==
In January 2024, Marichal was named in Uruguay's squad for the 2024 CONMEBOL Pre-Olympic Tournament. He received his first call-up to the Uruguay national team in March 2024 for friendlies against Basque Country and Ivory Coast. He made his debut on 23 March in a 1–1 draw against Basque Country.

In June 2024, Marichal was named in Uruguay's 26-man squad for the 2024 Copa América.

== Career statistics ==
=== Club ===
As of match played 24 October 2026

Appearances and goals by club, season and competition
Club	Season	League			Cup		Continental		Other		Total	
Club	Season	Division	Apps	Goals	Apps	Goals	Apps	Goals	Apps	Goals	Apps	Goals
Nacional	2020	Uruguayan Primera División	2	0	—		0	0	2 (Note: Appearances in Championship playoffs)	0	4	0
Nacional	2021	Uruguayan Primera División	20	0	—		7 (Note: Five appearances in Copa Libertadores and two appearances in Copa Sudamericana)	0	1 (Note: Appearance in Supercopa Uruguaya)	0	28	0
Nacional	2022	Uruguayan Primera División	23	0	0	0	9 (Note: Six appearances in Copa Libertadores and three appearances in Copa Sudamericana)	0	1 (Note: Appearance in Torneo Intermedio final)	0	33	0
Nacional	Total		45	0	0	0	16	0	4	0	65	0
Dynamo Moscow	2022–23	Russian Premier League	14	0	3	0	—		—		17	0
Dynamo Moscow	2023–24	Russian Premier League	21	0	10	0	—		—		31	0
Dynamo Moscow	2024–25	Russian Premier League	23	0	8	0	—		—		31	0
Dynamo Moscow	2025–26	Russian Premier League	26	5	10	1	—		—		36	6
Dynamo Moscow	2026–27	Russian Premier League	6	0	3	0	—		—		9	0
Dynamo Moscow	Total		90	5	34	1	—		—		124	6
Career total			135	5	34	1	16	0	4	0	189	6

=== International ===
As of match played 13 October 2025

Appearances and goals by national team and year
National team	Year	Apps	Goals
Uruguay	2024	3 (Note: Includes a Non-FIFA friendly played against the Basque Country, which is counted as an official match by the Uruguayan Football Association.)	0
Uruguay	2025	2	0
Total		5	0

== Honours ==
Nacional

- Uruguayan Primera División: 2020, 2022
- Supercopa Uruguaya: 2021

Uruguay

- Copa América third place: 2024
