= Milan Majstorović (footballer) =

Serbian footballer

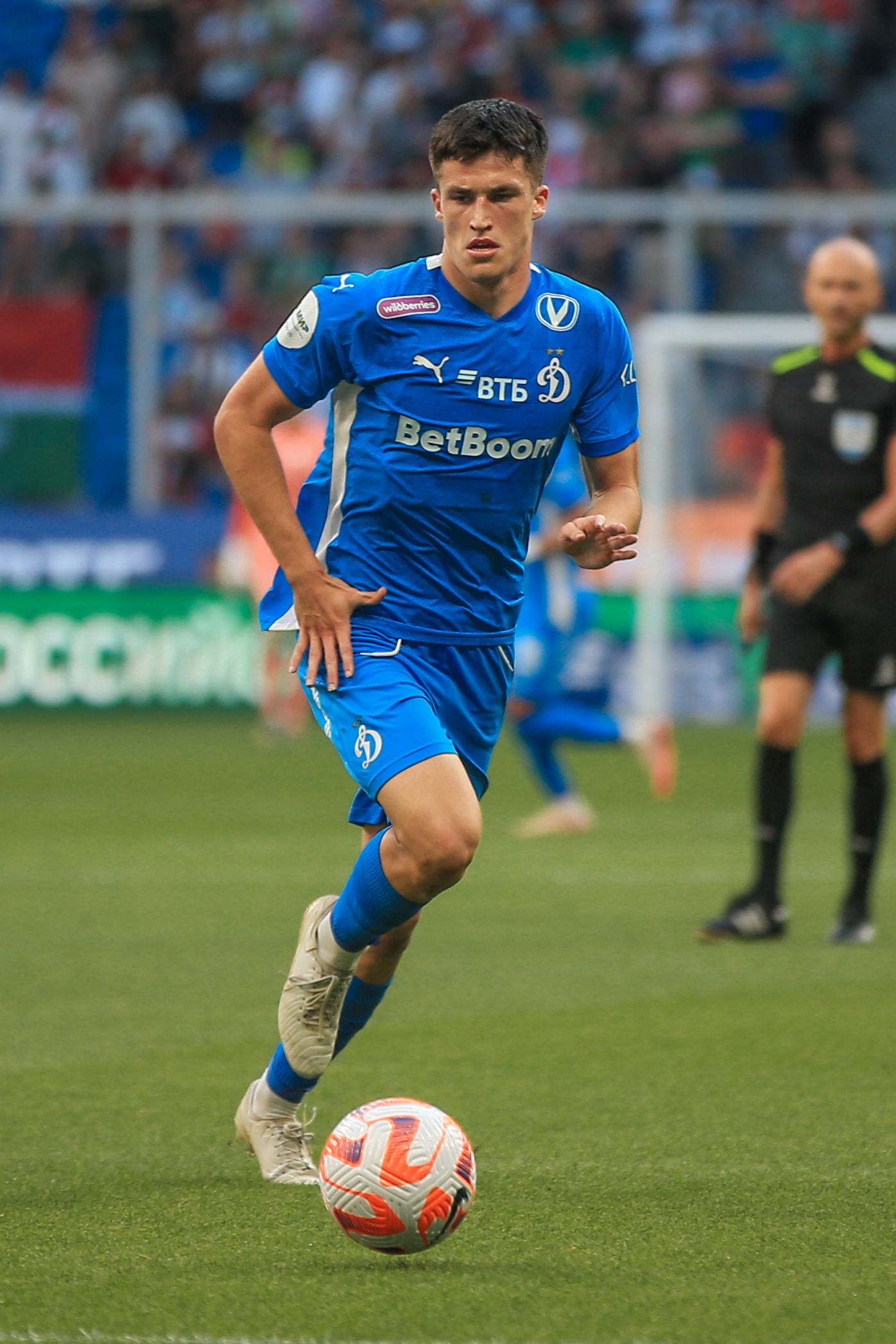

Personal information
- Date of birth: 21 February 2005 (age 21)
- Place of birth: Novi Sad, Serbia and Montenegro
- Height: 1.84 m (6 ft 0 in)
- Position: Centre-back

Team information
- Current team: Dynamo Moscow
- Number: 5

Youth career
- Vojvodina

Senior career*
Years	Team	Apps	(Gls)
2022–2023	Vojvodina	0	(0)
2023–	Dynamo Moscow	21	(1)

International career^{‡}
2019	Serbia U15	3	(0)
2021–2022	Serbia U17	10	(1)
2022	Serbia U18	4	(0)
2024	Serbia U19	2	(0)
- * Club domestic league appearances and goals as of 1 May 2026 ‡ National team caps and goals as of 23 March 2024

Milan Majstorović (Serbian Cyrillic: Милан Мајсторовић; born 21 February 2005) is a Serbian football player who plays as a centre-back for Russian club Dynamo Moscow.

== Club career ==
On 17 August 2022, Majstorović signed a contract with Russian Premier League club Dynamo Moscow, beginning in February 2023. He made his RPL debut for Dynamo on 11 March 2023 in a game against Krasnodar. On 14 May 2023, Majstorović suffered an ACL tear and missed an extended period of time recovering from surgery. He returned to the Dynamo squad in early 2024.

Majstorović took the spot in the starting line-up during preseason games in July 2024, as Dynamo's centre-backs Fabián Balbuena and Nicolás Marichal were away with their national teams at the 2024 Copa América. Dynamo manager Marcel Lička commented that Milan showed very good level of play in those games and it's time for him to prove he deserves the starting spot in official games. Milan began the 2024–25 Russian Premier League season in the starting line-up and scored his first goal for Dynamo on the second matchday on 27 July 2024 against Lokomotiv Moscow.

On 16 August 2024, Majstorović extended his contract with Dynamo to June 2029.

Majstorović remained in the starting lineup until the end of September 2024, when he began treatment for athletic pubalgia. After a period of non-invasive treatment that did not resolve the issue, on 2 December 2024 he underwent surgery for the condition. He appeared on the bench on 2 March 2025, as the Russian season restarted after the winter break. However, he was not included in the matchday squad after that game for more than a year for undisclosed medical reasons. He made his first bench appearance for Dynamo after recovering in April 2026. Milan returned to play on 26 April 2026 in a game against Sochi.

== International career ==
Majstorović represented Serbia at the 2022 UEFA European Under-17 Championship, where they reached the semi-finals.

== Career statistics ==
As of match played 19 August 2026

Appearances and goals by club, season and competition
Club	Season	League			Cup		Total	
Club	Season	Division	Apps	Goals	Apps	Goals	Apps	Goals
Vojvodina	2021–22	Serbian SuperLiga	0	0	0	0	0	0
Dynamo Moscow	2022–23	Russian Premier League	9	0	1	0	10	0
Dynamo Moscow	2023–24	Russian Premier League	1	0	1	0	2	0
Dynamo Moscow	2024–25	Russian Premier League	9	1	2	0	11	1
Dynamo Moscow	2025–26	Russian Premier League	2	0	0	0	2	0
Dynamo Moscow	2026–27	Russian Premier League	0	0	1	0	1	0
Dynamo Moscow	Total		21	1	5	0	26	1
Career total			21	1	5	0	26	1
