= Roberto Fernández (footballer, born 2000) =

Paraguayan footballer

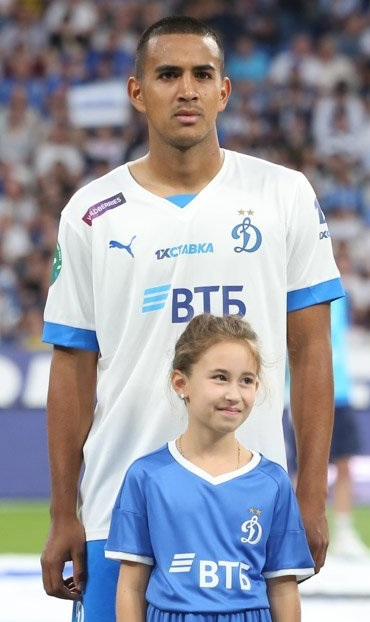
- Fernández with Dynamo Moscow in 2022

Personal information
- Full name: Roberto Fernández Urbieta
- Date of birth: 7 June 2000 (age 26)
- Place of birth: Concepción, Paraguay
- Height: 1.88 m (6 ft 2 in)
- Position: Centre-back

Team information
- Current team: Dynamo Moscow
- Number: 6

Youth career
- 2013–2019: Guaraní

Senior career*
Years	Team	Apps	(Gls)
2019–2022	Guaraní	69	(2)
2022–	Dynamo Moscow	77	(7)

International career
2017	Paraguay U17	12	(0)
2019	Paraguay U20	4	(0)
2020	Paraguay U23	1	(0)
- * Club domestic league appearances and goals as of 22 November 2026

Roberto Fernández Urbieta (born 7 June 2000) is a Paraguayan professional footballer who plays as a centre-back for Russian club Dynamo Moscow.

== Club career ==
Fernández is a youth product of Guaraní, having joined their youth academy at the age of 13. He began playing with their senior side in 2019 in the Paraguayan Primera División.

On 26 July 2022, Fernández signed a five-year contract with Russian Premier League club Dynamo Moscow. On 10 March 2025, he extended his contract with Dynamo to June 2029.

== International career ==
Fernández is a former youth international for Paraguay, and captained the Paraguay U17s at the 2017 FIFA U-17 World Cup.

In September 2022, Fernández was called up for the first time to the senior Paraguay national team for friendlies, but remained on the bench in those games. He was called up the next time in March 2024 for a friendly against Russia that was scheduled to be played at the stadium of his club team Dynamo Moscow, VTB Arena. However, the game was cancelled due to the Crocus City Hall attack.

== Career statistics ==
=== Club ===
As of match played 22 November 2026

Appearances and goals by club, season and competition
Club	Season	League			Cup		Continental		Other		Total	
Club	Season	Division	Apps	Goals	Apps	Goals	Apps	Goals	Apps	Goals	Apps	Goals
Guaraní	2019	Paraguayan Primera División	11	0	–		0	0	—		11	0
Guaraní	2020	Paraguayan Primera División	9	0	—		1	0	1 (Note: Appearance in Primera División Play-offs)	0	11	0
Guaraní	2021	Paraguayan Primera División	30	1	—		3	0	—		33	1
Guaraní	2022	Paraguayan Primera División	19	1	—		2	0	—		21	1
Guaraní	Total		69	2	—		6	0	1	0	76	2
Dynamo Moscow	2022–23	Russian Premier League	19	2	7	0	—		—		26	2
Dynamo Moscow	2023–24	Russian Premier League	22	3	11	0	—		—		33	3
Dynamo Moscow	2024–25	Russian Premier League	20	1	7	0	—		—		27	1
Dynamo Moscow	2025–26	Russian Premier League	12	0	8	0	—		—		20	0
Dynamo Moscow	2026–27	Russian Premier League	4	1	5	0	—		—		9	1
Dynamo Moscow	Total		77	7	38	0	—		—		115	7
Career total			146	9	38	0	6	0	1	0	191	9
