= Diego Laxalt =

Uruguayan footballer (born 1993)

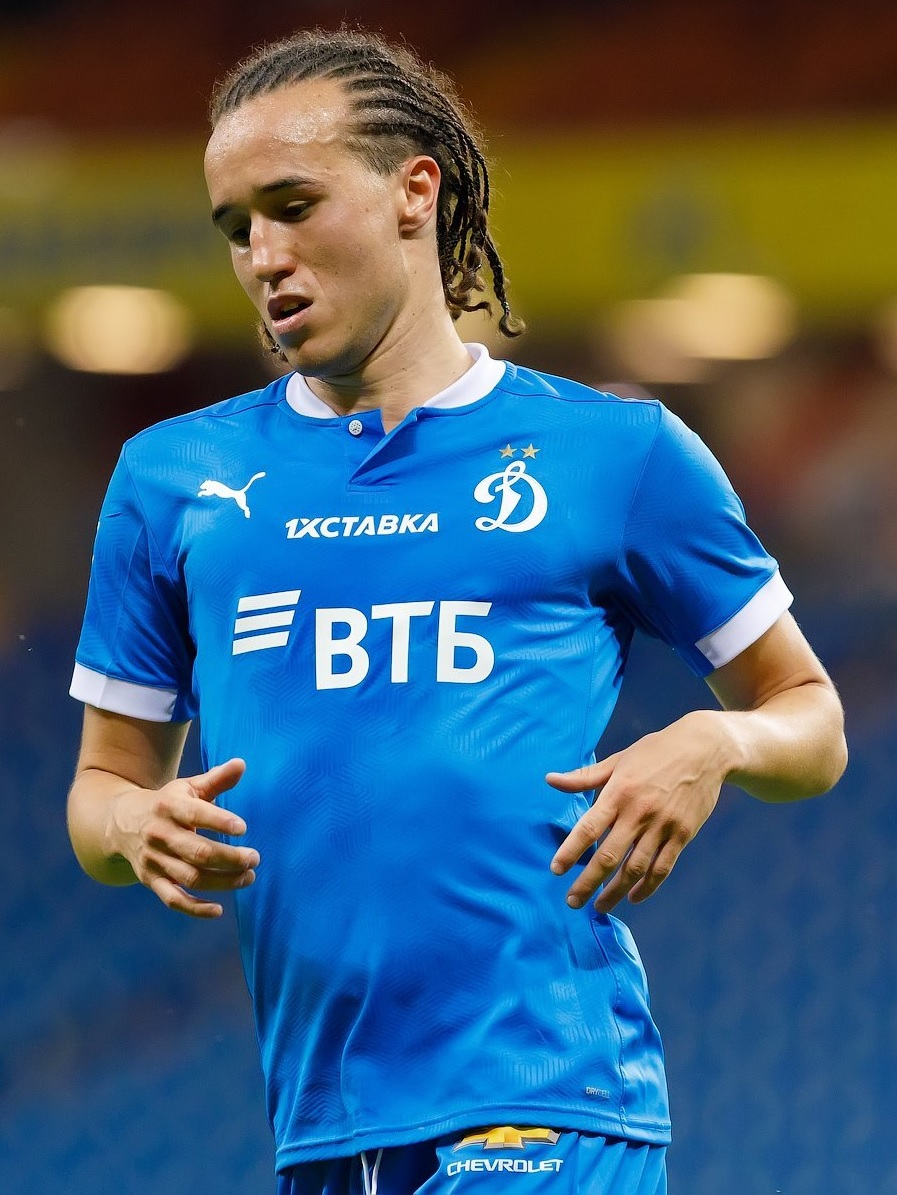
- Laxalt with Dynamo Moscow in 2021

Personal information
- Full name: Diego Sebastián Laxalt Suárez
- Date of birth: 7 February 1993 (age 33)
- Place of birth: Montevideo, Uruguay
- Height: 1.78 m (5 ft 10 in)
- Positions: Midfielder; left-back; left midfielder

Team information
- Current team: Peñarol
- Number: 93

Youth career
- Defensor Sporting

Senior career*
Years	Team	Apps	(Gls)
2012–2013	Defensor Sporting	15	(1)
2013–2016	Inter Milan	0	(0)
2013–2014	→ Bologna (loan)	15	(2)
2014–2015	→ Empoli (loan)	4	(0)
2015–2016	→ Genoa (loan)	43	(3)
2016–2018	Genoa	68	(4)
2018–2021	AC Milan	24	(0)
2019–2020	→ Torino (loan)	16	(0)
2020–2021	→ Celtic (loan)	17	(1)
2021–2025	Dynamo Moscow	62	(0)
2026–	Peñarol	13	(1)

International career
2012–2013	Uruguay U20	31	(2)
2016–2019	Uruguay	24	(0)
Medal record
Representing Uruguay
Men's Football
FIFA U-20 World Cup
Runner-up	2013 Turkey
South American U-20 Championship
Third place	2013 Argentina
- * Club domestic league appearances and goals as of 22 August 2026

Diego Sebastián Laxalt Suárez (Spanish pronunciation: [laɣˈsalt]; born 7 February 1993) is a Uruguayan professional footballer who plays as a midfielder or left-back for Peñarol. He is a youth product of Defensor Sporting, having passed through the youth ranks in July 2012.

== Club career ==
=== Defensor Sporting ===
Born in Montevideo, Laxalt made his professional debut on 1 September 2012 with Defensor Sporting in a 4–0 win against Montevideo Wanderers. On 24 February 2013, after the South American Championship football Under-20 in 2013, he returned to the field with the jersey of Violeta in the away game against Nacional. He concluded his first season with 15 appearances and 1 goal.

=== Inter Milan ===
==== 2013–14: Arrival and loan to Bologna ====
Inter Milan bought Laxalt in January 2013, with the deal completed in July 2013. The then new coach of Inter Milan, Walter Mazzarri, however, did not include him in the pre-season squad. He spent the season on loan at Bologna.

==== 2014–15: Loan to Empoli ====
After returning from loan, he was included in the pre-season squad by Walter Mazzarri. On 13 August 2014, Empoli announced the loan signing of Laxalt with Inter Milan entitled to the right of a counter-purchase.

=== Genoa ===
On 30 January 2015, Genoa signed Laxalt on loan for 18 months with an optional purchase clause. He scored his first 2 goals for Genoa on 28 October 2015, in an away match against Torino.

On 30 July 2016, Laxalt joined Genoa on a permanent deal, with Cristian Ansaldi moving in the opposite direction.

=== AC Milan ===
==== 2018–19: Debut season and Supercoppa runner-up ====
On 16 August 2018, Laxalt joined fellow Serie A club AC Milan in a deal worth a reported €14 million plus a further €4 million in potential bonuses, with striker Gianluca Lapadula moving in the opposite direction for €11 million. He made his competitive debut for the club on 25 August 2018, coming on as a 71st-minute substitute for Fabio Borini in a 3-2 league defeat to Napoli.

==== 2019–20: Loan to Torino and recall ====
With both Théo Hernandez and Ricardo Rodríguez in front of him at left back, Laxalt was deemed surplus to and on 31 August 2019, transferred to Torino, on a season-long loan deal with an option to buy. On 31 January 2020, Laxalt was recalled from his loan to be the back up for Hernandez after Rodríguez had left to join Eredivisie side PSV on loan. During the course of his loan, Laxalt made only 5 starts in all competitions for Torino but came off the bench 13 times including against parent-club Milan in the Coppa Italia a week before his return.

==== 2020–21: Loan to Celtic ====
On 5 October 2020, Laxalt completed a season-long loan to Scottish club Celtic. He made his debut at Celtic Park against Rangers in the Old Firm Derby, and his next game was against his parent club, Milan in the Europa League . He scored his first goal for Celtic when scoring a late equaliser in a 2–2 draw against Hibernian on 21 November 2020. Laxalt won the first major honour of his career when he played for Celtic in their penalty shoot-out victory against Hearts in the rescheduled 2020 Scottish Cup Final. The match was originally scheduled to take place at Hampden Park on 9 May 2020, but was postponed prior to the semi-finals as a result of the COVID-19 pandemic in Scotland.

=== Dynamo Moscow ===
==== 2021–23: Struggles with injures ====
On 22 June 2021, Dynamo Moscow announced the signing of Laxalt on a 3-year contract with an option to extend for one more season. It is reported that the cost of the transfer was €3.5 million, and the player's salary will be €2.5 million per year.

His first two seasons at Dynamo were plagued by recurring injuries to his hip, thigh and knee. The longest streak of consecutive games in the starting lineup for him was 7 games in the 2021–22 and 2022–23 seasons.

==== 2023–24: Top performances and contract extension ====
Early in the 2023–24 season, Dynamo's new manager Marcel Lička began to deploy Laxalt in a defensive midfielder position. Laxalt was voted player of the month by Dynamo fans for July 2023. On 6 August 2023, in an away game against the defending champions Zenit Saint Petersburg, Laxalt assisted on Dynamo's winning goal deep in added time. That was the first away Dynamo victory over Zenit in the league after 8 consecutive losses since 2014. He was voted player of the month once again for August 2023.

On 19 October 2023, Laxalt extended his contract with Dynamo to June 2026, with an option for 2026–27 season.

==== 2024–25: Injuries and departure ====
Laxalt's 2024–25 season was again marred by injuries, with the longest consecutive starting-lineup streak limited to 4 games. On 22 August 2025, Laxalt left Dynamo by mutual consent.

== International career ==
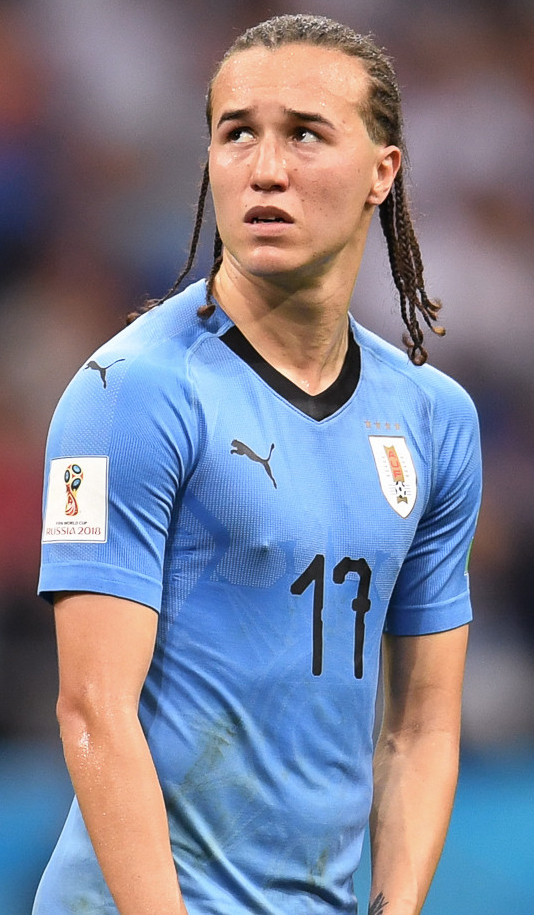
Laxalt with the national team in 2018

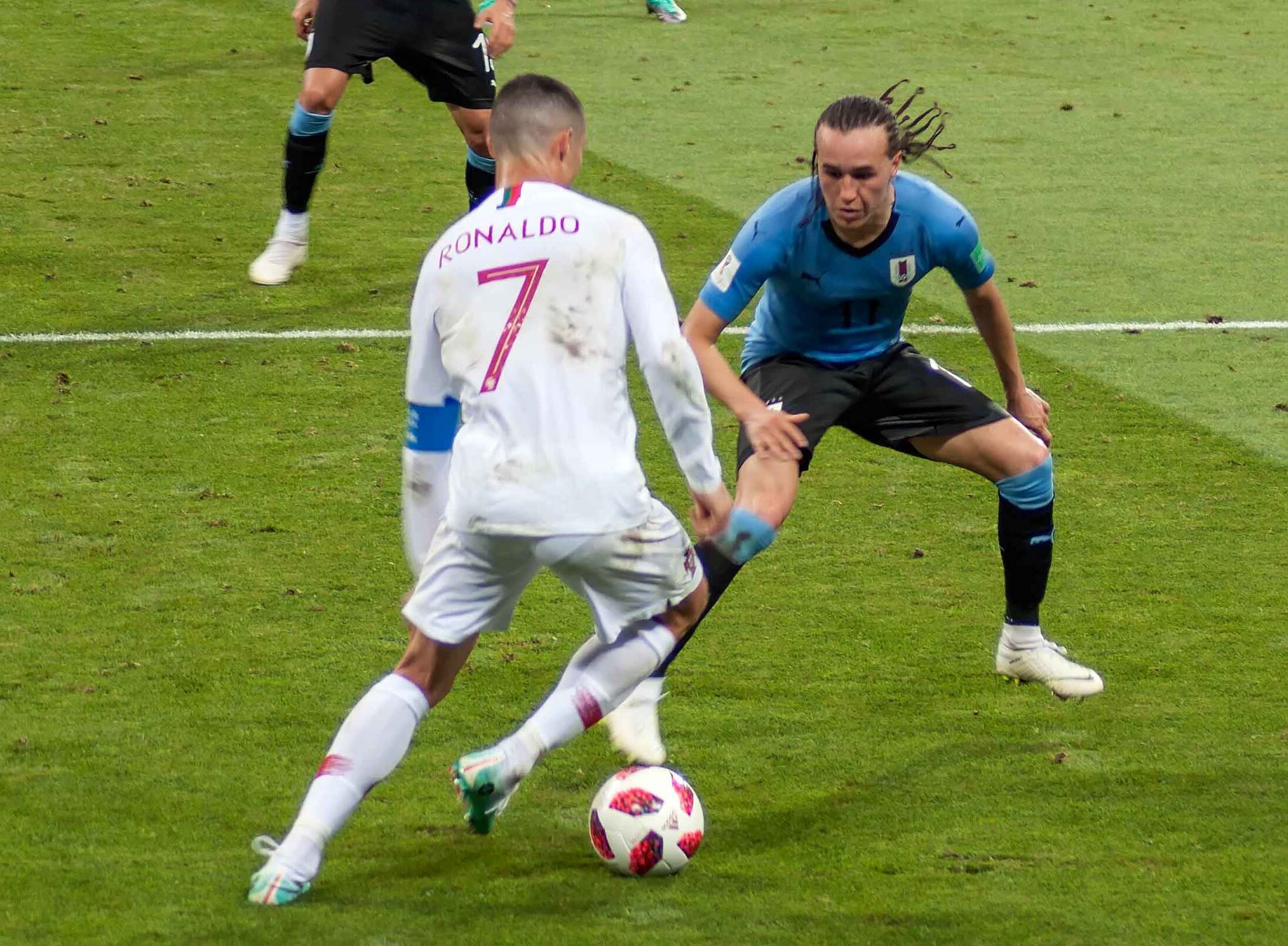
Laxalt defending against Portugal's Cristiano Ronaldo during the 2018 FIFA World Cup

=== 2013 South American Youth Championship ===
He made his debut with Uruguay in the 2013 South American Youth Championship in Argentina, on 10 January 2013 in the 3–3 draw against Peru. Two days later, he scored his first goal in the 6th minute in an eventual 3–2 win over Brazil. On 18 January, his team finished 2nd in Group B, behind Peru.

On 3 February, he completed all games played, and Uruguay qualified for the 2013 FIFA U-20 World Cup in Turkey and was included in the best XI of the event.

=== 2013 FIFA U-20 World Cup ===
After contributing to qualification for the 2013 FIFA U–20 World Cup, he was included in the squad for the event. He made his debut on 2 June 2013, in the 1–0 defeat against Croatia, where he played the full 90 minutes. The first victory in the group stage came in the next game, as Uruguay beat New Zealand 2–0. Laxalt was substituted in the 82nd minute for Gonzalo Bueno.

Uruguay also won the last game of the group stage against Uzbekistan, 4–0, the game that allowed Uruguay to qualify for the next round in 2nd place with 6 points, only behind Croatia. In the second round, Uruguay defeated Nigeria, with a 2–1 result, where he was substituted for Gonzalo Bueno in the 77th minute. On 6 July, at the quarter-final against Spain, the game went to extra time.

=== Senior ===
Laxalt was called up to Uruguay's Copa America Centenario squad to replace the injured Cristian Rodríguez. He made his full debut against Ireland on 4 June 2017. He was called up to the full Uruguay squad for the China Cup in March 2018.

In May 2018, he was named in Uruguay's provisional 26-man squad for the 2018 World Cup in Russia.

== Style of play ==
Laxalt is left-footed, physically strong and very versatile. He has described himself by saying that: "My strengths are speed and endurance. I'm a left-footed midfielder who can fit in other positions." He has compared himself to the Inter Milan legend Álvaro Recoba, who is also a former Uruguayan midfielder.

== Personal life ==
Born in Uruguay, Laxalt is of Italian descent, and holds dual Uruguayan-Italian citizenship.

== Career statistics ==
=== Club ===
As of match played 2 September 2026

Appearances and goals by club, season and competition
Club	Season	League			National Cup		Continental		Other		Total	
Club	Season	Division	Apps	Goals	Apps	Goals	Apps	Goals	Apps	Goals	Apps	Goals
Defensor Sporting	2012–13	Uruguayan Primera División	15	1	0	0	0	0	–		15	1
Bologna (loan)	2013–14	Serie A	15	2	0	0	–		–		15	2
Empoli (loan)	2014–15	Serie A	4	0	3	1	–		–		7	1
Genoa	2014–15	Serie A	8	0	0	0	–		–		8	0
Genoa	2015–16	Serie A	35	3	1	0	–		–		36	3
Genoa	2016–17	Serie A	36	1	3	0	–		–		39	1
Genoa	2017–18	Serie A	32	3	2	1	–		–		34	4
Genoa	Total		111	7	6	1	–		–		117	8
Milan	2018–19	Serie A	20	0	4	0	5 (Note: Appearances in UEFA Europa League)	0	–		29	0
Milan	2019–20	Serie A	4	0	2	0	–		–		6	0
Milan	Total		24	0	6	0	5	0	–		35	0
Torino (loan)	2019–20	Serie A	16	0	2	0	–		–		18	0
Celtic (loan)	2020–21	Scottish Premiership	17	1	4 (Note: Includes two appearances in the latter stages of the 2019–20 Scottish Cup that were played in October and December 2020)	0	6	0	1 (Note: Appearance in Scottish League Cup)	0	28	1
Dynamo Moscow	2021–22	Russian Premier League	14	0	2	0	–		–		16	0
Dynamo Moscow	2022–23	Russian Premier League	9	0	5	0	–		–		14	0
Dynamo Moscow	2023–24	Russian Premier League	24	0	6	0	–		–		30	0
Dynamo Moscow	2024–25	Russian Premier League	15	0	3	0	–		–		18	0
Dynamo Moscow	Total		62	0	16	0	–		–		78	0
Peñarol	2026	Uruguayan Primera División	13	1	2	0	4 (Note: Appearances in Copa Libertadores)	0	1 (Note: Appearance in Supercopa Uruguaya)	0	20	1
Career total			277	12	39	2	15	0	2	0	333	14

=== International ===
As of match played 18 November 2019

Appearances and goals by national team and year
National team	Year	Apps	Goals
Uruguay	2016	2	0
Uruguay	2017	1	0
Uruguay	2018	12	0
Uruguay	2019	9	0
Total		24	0

== Honours ==
=== Club ===
Celtic

- Scottish Cup: 2019–20

=== International ===
Uruguay U20

- FIFA U-20 World Cup runner-up: 2013
