= Ivan Zazvonkin =

Russian footballer

Personal information
- Full name: Ivan Denisovich Zazvonkin
- Date of birth: 10 March 2004 (age 22)
- Place of birth: Tyumen, Russia
- Height: 1.74 m (5 ft 9 in)
- Position: Attacking midfielder

Team information
- Current team: Tyumen
- Number: 29

Youth career
- –2020: Tyumen
- 2020–2021: Dynamo Moscow

Senior career*
Years	Team	Apps	(Gls)
2022–2024	Dynamo-2 Moscow	47	(8)
2022–2025	Dynamo Moscow	0	(0)
2024	→ Chernomorets Novorossiysk (loan)	7	(1)
2024–2025	→ Baltika Kaliningrad (loan)	2	(0)
2024–2025	→ Baltika-BFU Kaliningrad (loan)	9	(0)
2025	→ Yenisey Krasnoyarsk (loan)	4	(0)
2025–2026	Yenisey Krasnoyarsk	12	(0)
2026–	Tyumen	0	(0)

International career^{‡}
2019–2020	Russia U16	12	(1)
2021	Russia U18	2	(1)
2023	Russia U19	1	(1)
2023	Russia U21	1	(0)
- * Club domestic league appearances and goals as of 17 October 2026 ‡ National team caps and goals as of 15 June 2023

Ivan Denisovich Zazvonkin (Russian: Иван Денисович Зазвонкин; born 10 March 2004) is a Russian football player who plays as an attacking midfielder for Tyumen.

== Club career ==
Zazvonkin made his debut for Dynamo Moscow on 4 October 2023 in a Russian Cup game against Spartak Moscow and scored the last goal in a 3–0 win.

On 16 January 2024, Zazvonkin moved on loan to Chernomorets Novorossiysk until the end of the season. On 19 July 2024, he was loaned to Baltika Kaliningrad. On 22 January 2025, Zazvonkin moved on loan to Yenisey Krasnoyarsk, with an option to buy.

On 27 June 2025, Zazvonkin moved to Yenisey on a permanent basis.

== Career statistics ==
As of match played 24 May 2025

Appearances and goals by club, season and competition
Club	Season	League			Cup		Continental		Other		Total	
Club	Season	Division	Apps	Goals	Apps	Goals	Apps	Goals	Apps	Goals	Apps	Goals
Dynamo-2 Moscow	2021–22	Russian Second League	12	1	–		–		–		12	1
Dynamo-2 Moscow	2022–23	Russian Second League	28	5	–		–		–		28	5
Dynamo-2 Moscow	2023–24	Russian Second League	7	2	–		–		–		7	2
Dynamo-2 Moscow	Total		47	8	–		–		–		47	8
Dynamo Moscow	2023–24	Russian Premier League	0	0	1	1	–		–		1	1
Chernomorets Novorossiysk (loan)	2023–24	Russian First League	7	1	0	0	–		–		7	1
Baltika Kaliningrad (loan)	2024–25	Russian First League	2	0	3	1	–		–		5	1
Baltika-BFU Kaliningrad (loan)	2024	Russian Second League B	9	0	–		–		–		9	0
Yenisey Krasnoyarsk (loan)	2024–25	Russian First League	4	0	0	0	–		–		4	0
Career total			69	9	4	2	0	0	0	0	73	11
