= Ivan Lepsky =

Russian footballer (born 2005)

Personal information
- Full name: Ivan Maksimovich Lepsky
- Date of birth: 19 January 2005 (age 21)
- Place of birth: Vilyuchinsk, Russia
- Height: 1.85 m (6 ft 1 in)
- Position: Centre-back

Team information
- Current team: Krylia Sovetov Samara
- Number: 18

Youth career
- 2016–2023: Dynamo Moscow

Senior career*
Years	Team	Apps	(Gls)
2022–2024	Dynamo-2 Moscow	47	(7)
2023–2026	Dynamo Moscow	4	(1)
2025	→ Sokol Saratov (loan)	12	(0)
2025–2026	→ Krylia Sovetov Samara (loan)	16	(0)
2026–	Krylia Sovetov Samara	0	(0)

International career^{‡}
2019–2020	Russia U15	4	(0)
2021	Russia U17	1	(0)
2022	Russia U18	4	(0)
2023–	Russia U21	3	(1)
- * Club domestic league appearances and goals as of 25 April 2026 ‡ National team caps and goals as of 5 June 2025

Ivan Maksimovich Lepsky (Russian: Иван Максимович Лепский; born 19 January 2005) is a Russian football player who plays as a centre-back for Krylia Sovetov Samara.

== Club career ==
Lepsky made his debut in the Russian Premier League for Dynamo Moscow on 15 September 2023 in a game against Pari Nizhny Novgorod.

On 9 January 2025, Lepsky was loaned by Sokol Saratov until the end of the season. On 9 July 2025, he moved on loan to Krylia Sovetov Samara, with an option to buy.

On 11 June 2026, Krylia Sovetov made the transfer permanent and signed a three-year contract with Lepsky.

== Career statistics ==
As of match played 14 October 2026

Appearances and goals by club, season and competition
Club	Season	League			Cup		Total	
Club	Season	Division	Apps	Goals	Apps	Goals	Apps	Goals
Dynamo-2 Moscow	2021–22	Russian Second League	5	0	—		5	0
Dynamo-2 Moscow	2022–23	Russian Second League	11	1	—		11	1
Dynamo-2 Moscow	2023	Russian Second League B	10	3	—		10	3
Dynamo-2 Moscow	2024	Russian Second League B	21	3	—		21	3
Dynamo-2 Moscow	Total		47	7	0	0	47	7
Dynamo Moscow	2023–24	Russian Premier League	1	0	1	0	2	0
Dynamo Moscow	2024–25	Russian Premier League	3	1	5	0	8	1
Dynamo Moscow	Total		4	1	6	0	10	1
Sokol Saratov (loan)	2024–25	Russian First League	12	0	0	0	12	0
Krylia Sovetov Samara (loan)	2025–26	Russian Premier League	16	0	6	2	22	2
Krylia Sovetov Samara	2026–27	Russian Premier League	0	0	3	0	3	0
Krylia Sovetov Samara	Total		16	0	9	2	25	2
Career total			79	8	15	2	94	10
