= Formosa do Oeste =

Coordinates: 24.2928°S 53.3128°W

- Municipality
- Flag Coat of arms
- Interactive map of Formosa do Oeste
- Country: Brazil
- Region: Southern
- State: Paraná
- Mesoregion: Oeste Paranaense

Population (2020)
  - Total: 6,460
- Time zone: UTC−3 (BRT)

Formosa do Oeste is a municipality in the state of Paraná in the Southern Region of Brazil.

== See also ==
- List of municipalities in Paraná
