= Artur Gladyshev =

Russian singer (born 1968)

Artur Olegovich Gladyshev
- Артур Олегович Гладышев
- Born: January 1, 1968 (age 58); Dushanbe, Tajik SSR, Soviet Union (present-day Tajikistan)
- Occupation: Singer

Artur Olegovich Gladyshev (Note: Russian: Артур Олегович Гладышев, romanized: Artur Olegovich Gladyshev) (born January 1, 1968) is a Russian singer. He was born in Dushanbe USSR (now in Tajikistan) and lives in Moscow and in Sosnovoborsk. He is the author of over 70 songs and has produced several albums, among which are:

- "New Gymnastics" (Russian: Новая гимнастика) – Moscow, 1988
- "Lady at the Wheel" (Russian: Дама за рулем) – Moscow, 1995
- "Red America" (Russian: Красная Америка – Moscow, 1997

He participated as drummer in Sergei Kosygin's album Kamchadaly (Russian: Камчадалы), Moscow, 1996.

Artur Gladyshev is the author of the book Who does not know, that such summers exist in Siberia Russian: Кто не знает, что такое лето и Сибирь, published in Moscow in 1998. The book narrates an excursion by boat on the Mana River.
