= Stanislav Bessmertny =

Russian footballer

Personal information
- Full name: Stanislav Vasilyevich Bessmertny
- Date of birth: 11 March 2004 (age 22)
- Place of birth: Rostov-on-Don, Russia
- Height: 1.80 m (5 ft 11 in)
- Position: Right-back

Team information
- Current team: Rodina Moscow (on loan from Dynamo Moscow)
- Number: 80

Youth career
- –2021: Dynamo Moscow

Senior career*
Years	Team	Apps	(Gls)
2021–	Dynamo-2 Moscow	60	(1)
2022–	Dynamo Moscow	6	(1)
2025	→ Ural Yekaterinburg (loan)	8	(1)
2025–	→ Rodina Moscow (loan)	30	(0)

International career^{‡}
2021	Russia U17	2	(0)
2021	Russia U18	6	(0)
2023	Russia U19	1	(0)
2023–	Russia U21	8	(0)
- * Club domestic league appearances and goals as of 16 September 2026 ‡ National team caps and goals as of 18 November 2025

Stanislav Vasilyevich Bessmertny (Russian: Станислав Васильевич Бессмертный; born 11 March 2004) is a Russian football player who plays as a right-back for Rodina Moscow on loan from Dynamo Moscow.

== Career ==
Bessmertny made his debut for the main squad of Dynamo Moscow on 25 July 2023 in a Russian Cup game against Pari Nizhny Novgorod. His Russian Premier League debut came on 6 August 2023 against Zenit Saint Petersburg. In his first RPL start on 13 August 2023 against Baltika Kaliningrad he opened scoring in Dynamo's 2–0 victory and was chosen player of the game.

In February 2024, Bessmertny suffered a fractured collarbone in a friendly match with the Kazakh FC Yelimay and was forced to interrupt training for two weeks.

On 18 February 2025, Bessmertny moved on loan to Ural Yekaterinburg.

On 2 July 2025, Bessmertny extended his Dynamo contract to 2028 and was loaned to Rodina Moscow for the 2025–26 season. On 1 July 2026, the loan to Rodina was renewed for the 2026–27 season, with an option to buy.

== Career statistics ==
As of match played 28 October 2026

Appearances and goals by club, season and competition
Club	Season	League			Cup		Other		Total	
Club	Season	Division	Apps	Goals	Apps	Goals	Apps	Goals	Apps	Goals
Dynamo-2 Moscow	2021–22	Russian Second League	21	0	—		—		21	0
Dynamo-2 Moscow	2022–23	Russian Second League	26	0	—		—		26	0
Dynamo-2 Moscow	2023	Russian Second League	4	0	—		—		4	0
Dynamo-2 Moscow	2024	Russian Second League	7	1	—		—		7	1
Dynamo-2 Moscow	Total		58	1	0	0	0	0	58	1
Dynamo Moscow	2023–24	Russian Premier League	4	1	5	0	—		9	1
Dynamo Moscow	2024–25	Russian Premier League	2	0	4	0	—		6	0
Dynamo Moscow	Total		6	1	9	0	0	0	15	1
Ural Yekaterinburg (loan)	2024–25	Russian First League	8	1	2	0	2 (Note: Appearances in promotion play-offs)	0	12	1
Rodina Moscow (loan)	2025–26	Russian First League	22	0	0	0	—		22	0
Rodina Moscow (loan)	2026–27	Russian Premier League	8	0	4	0	—		12	0
Rodina Moscow (loan)	Total		30	0	4	0	0	0	34	0
Career total			102	3	15	0	2	0	119	3
