= Ilya Ishkov =

Russian footballer (born 2005)

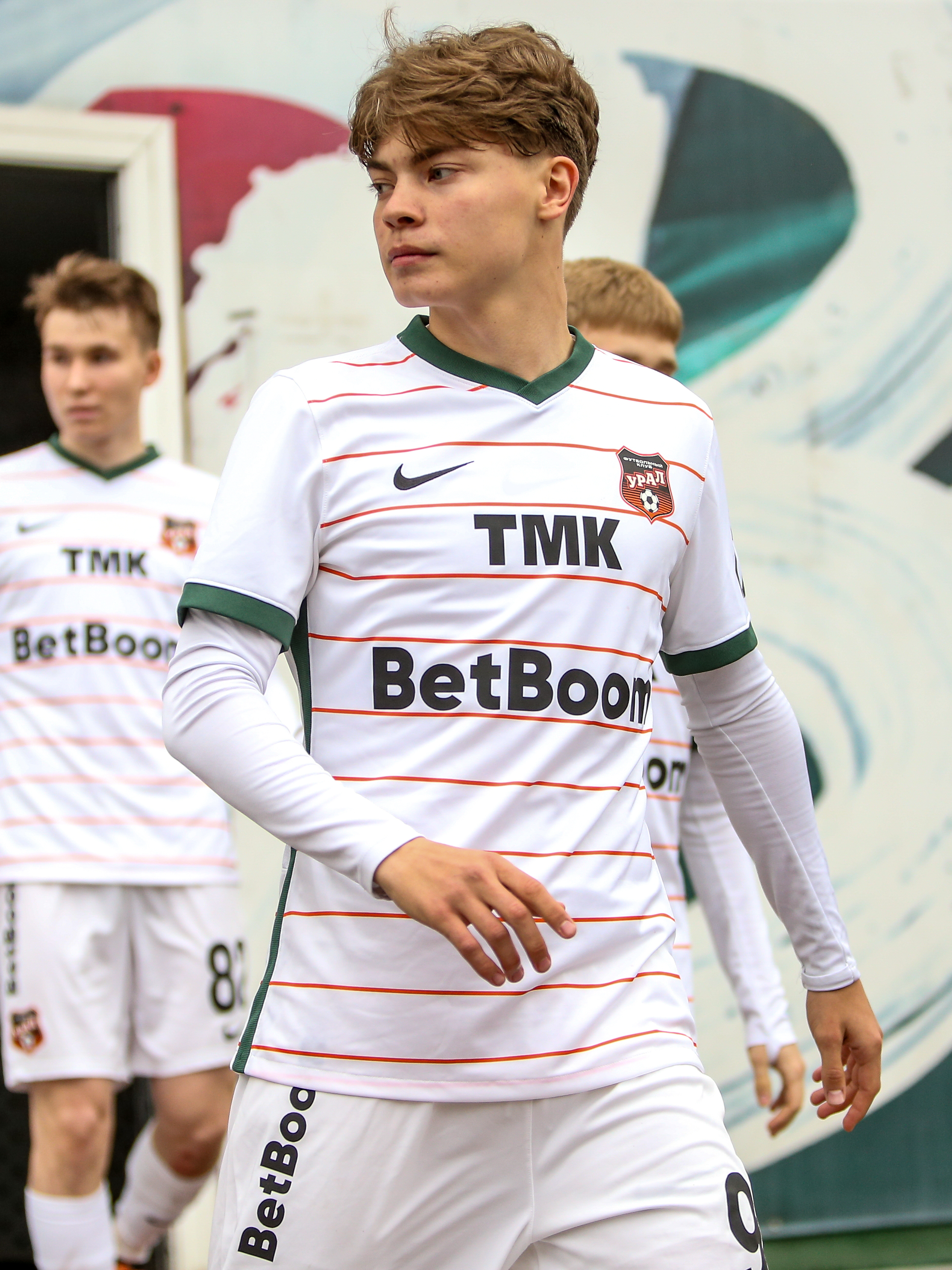
- Ishkov in 2023

Personal information
- Full name: Ilya Igorevich Ishkov
- Date of birth: 25 May 2005 (age 21)
- Place of birth: Yekaterinburg, Russia
- Height: 1.75 m (5 ft 9 in)
- Position: Right winger

Team information
- Current team: Ural Yekaterinburg
- Number: 97

Youth career
- 2022–2023: Ural Yekaterinburg

Senior career*
Years	Team	Apps	(Gls)
2022–2023	Ural-2 Yekaterinburg	10	(0)
2023–	Ural Yekaterinburg	83	(8)

International career^{‡}
2023–	Russia U21	7	(3)
- * Club domestic league appearances and goals as of 16 May 2026 ‡ National team caps and goals as of 8 June 2025

Ilya Igorevich Ishkov (Russian: Илья Игоревич Ишков; born 25 May 2005) is a Russian football player who plays as a right winger for Ural Yekaterinburg.

== Career ==
He made his debut in the Russian Premier League for Ural Yekaterinburg on 3 June 2023 in a game against Sochi.

== Career statistics ==
As of match played 1 June 2024

Appearances and goals by club, season and competition
Club	Season	League			Russian Cup		Europe		Other		Total	
Club	Season	Division	Apps	Goals	Apps	Goals	Apps	Goals	Apps	Goals	Apps	Goals
Ural-2 Yekaterinburg	2022–23	Russian Second League	10	0	0	0	—		—		10	0
Ural Yekaterinburg	2022–23	Russian Premier League	0	0	0	0	—		—		0	0
Ural Yekaterinburg	2023–24	Russian Premier League	27	1	8	0	—		2 (Note: Appearances in the relegation play-offs)	0	37	1
Ural Yekaterinburg	Total		27	1	8	0	—		2	0	37	1
Career total			37	1	8	0	0	0	2	0	47	1

== Honours ==
Individual

- Russian Premier League goal of the month: October 2023 (29 October 2023 vs. Dynamo Moscow).
