= Ulvi Babayev =

Russian footballer

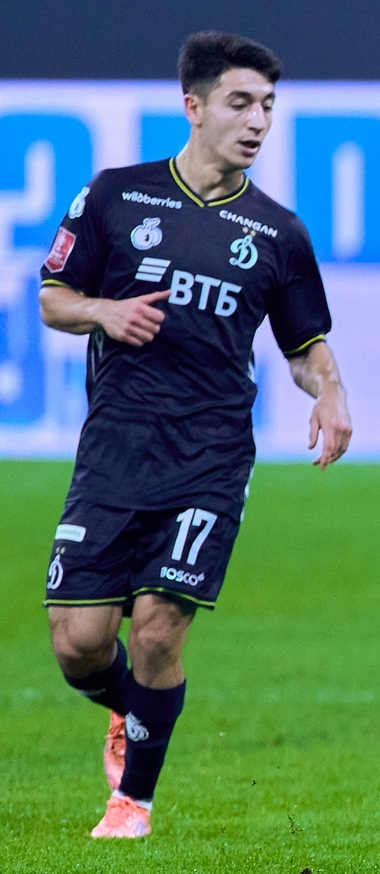
- Babayev with Dynamo Moscow in 2025

Personal information
- Full name: Ulvi Lachyn ogly Babayev
- Date of birth: 30 March 2004 (age 22)
- Place of birth: Khimki, Russia
- Height: 1.72 m (5 ft 8 in)
- Position: Left winger

Team information
- Current team: Rubin Kazan (on loan from Dynamo Moscow)
- Number: 7

Youth career
- –2014: Khimki
- 2014–2022: Dynamo Moscow

Senior career*
Years	Team	Apps	(Gls)
2021–	Dynamo-2 Moscow	44	(16)
2023–	Dynamo Moscow	15	(1)
2024–2025	→ Krylia Sovetov Samara (loan)	14	(0)
2026–	→ Rubin Kazan (loan)	6	(1)

International career^{‡}
2018–2019	Russia U15	8	(0)
2019	Russia U16	2	(0)
2025–	Russia U21	3	(3)
- * Club domestic league appearances and goals as of 21 November 2026 ‡ National team caps and goals as of 18 November 2025

Ulvi Lachyn ogly Babayev (Russian: Ульви Лачын оглы Бабаев; born 30 March 2004) is a Russian football player of Azerbaijani descent who plays as a left winger for Rubin Kazan on loan from Dynamo Moscow.

== Club career ==
He made his debut in the Russian Premier League for Dynamo Moscow on 3 June 2023 in a game against Orenburg.

On 7 August 2024, Babayev moved on loan to Krylia Sovetov Samara.

On 22 October 2025, Babayev scored a hat-trick for Dynamo in a Russian Cup game against Krylia Sovetov.

On 14 January 2026, Babayev extended his Dynamo contract to June 2029, with an option for the 2029–30 season.

On 11 September 2026, Babayev was loaned by Rubin Kazan, with an option to buy.

== International career ==
In October 2025, it was reported that AFFA is holding talks with Babayev to consider representing Azerbaijan internationally.

However, in mid-November 2025, Babayev made his debut for the Russia U21 team and scored twice in his second appearance, against Bahrain U23.

== Career statistics ==
As of match played 21 November 2026

Appearances and goals by club, season and competition
Club	Season	League			Cup		Total	
Club	Season	Division	Apps	Goals	Apps	Goals	Apps	Goals
Dynamo-2 Moscow	2021–22	Russian Second League	10	1	—		10	1
Dynamo-2 Moscow	2022–23	Russian Second League	19	8	—		19	8
Dynamo-2 Moscow	2024	Russian Second League	15	7	—		15	7
Dynamo-2 Moscow	Total		44	16	—		44	16
Dynamo Moscow	2022–23	Russian Premier League	1	0	0	0	1	0
Dynamo Moscow	2025–26	Russian Premier League	15	1	7	4	22	5
Dynamo Moscow	2026–27	Russian Premier League	0	0	3	0	3	0
Dynamo Moscow	Total		16	1	10	4	26	5
Krylia Sovetov Samara (loan)	2024–25	Russian Premier League	14	0	5	2	19	2
Rubin Kazan (loan)	2026–27	Russian Premier League	6	1	2	1	8	2
Career total			80	18	17	7	97	25
