= Vadim Gladyshev =

Russian footballer and official

Personal information
- Full name: Vadim Viktorovich Gladyshev
- Date of birth: 10 December 1976 (age 49)
- Height: 1.83 m (6 ft 0 in)
- Positions: Midfielder; forward

Senior career*
Years	Team	Apps	(Gls)
1995	FC Lada-d Togliatti	22	(3)
1996–1997	FC Lada Togliatti	18	(0)
1997–1998	FC Volga Ulyanovsk	48	(7)
1999	FC Neftyanik Pokhvistnevo	12	(1)
1999–2000	FC KAMAZ-Chally Naberezhnye Chelny	18	(0)
2001–2003	FC Dynamo-Mashinostroitel Kirov	65	(6)
2004–2005	SKP Togliatti		
Total		183	(17)

Managerial career
- 2019–2021: FC Akron Tolyatti (assistant administrator)
- * Club domestic league appearances and goals

Vadim Viktorovich Gladyshev (Russian: Вадим Викторович Гладышев; born 10 December 1976) is a Russian football official and a former player.

== Personal life ==
His son Yaroslav Gladyshev is also a professional footballer.
