= Moumi Ngamaleu =

Cameroonian footballer

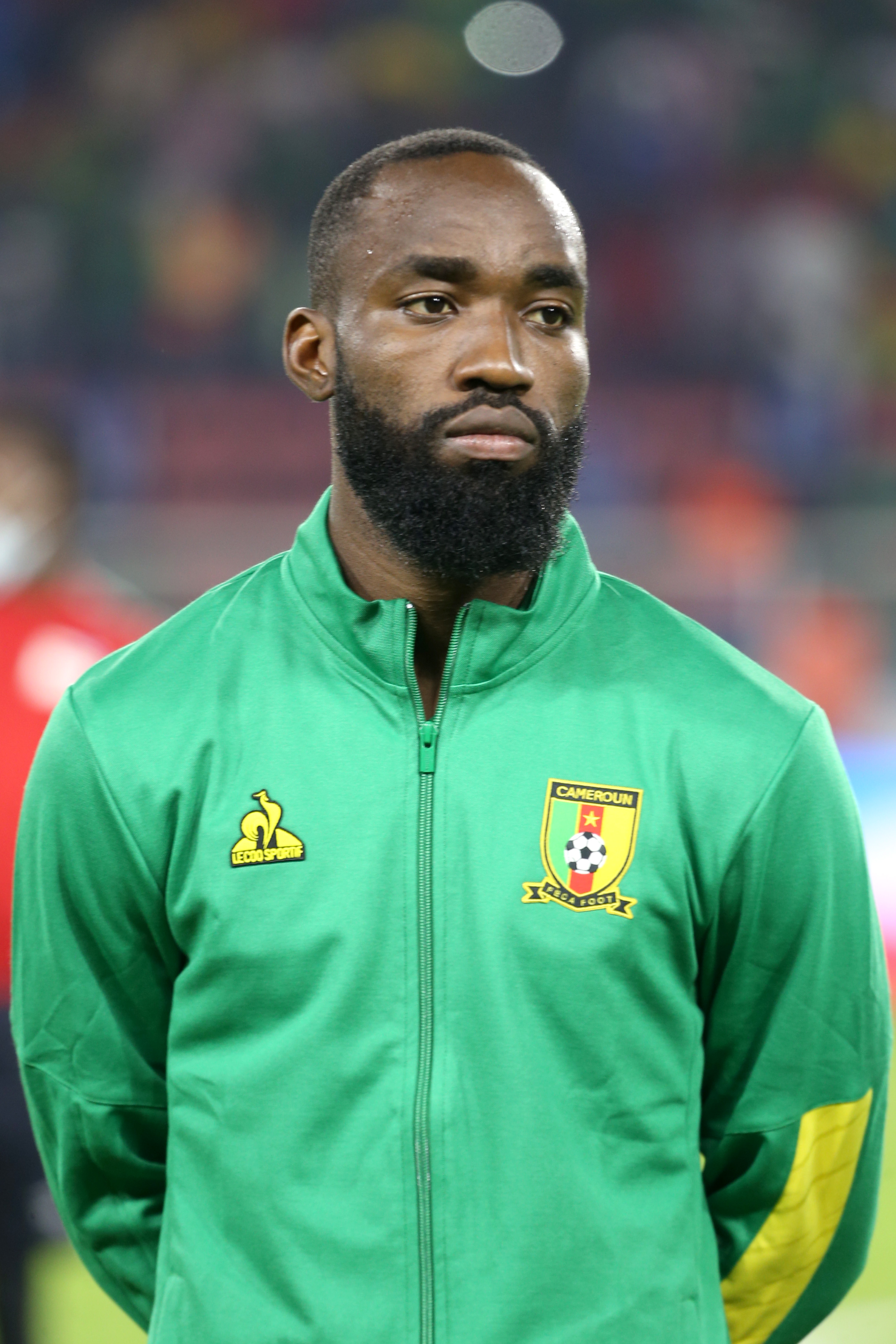
- Ngamaleu with Cameroon at the 2021 Africa Cup of Nations

Personal information
- Full name: Nicolas Brice Moumi Ngamaleu
- Date of birth: 9 July 1994 (age 32)
- Place of birth: Yaoundé, Cameroon
- Height: 1.81 m (5 ft 11 in)
- Position: Winger

Team information
- Current team: Pafos
- Number: 13

Youth career
- 2010–2011: Musango Yaoundé
- 2011–2013: Canon Yaoundé

Senior career*
Years	Team	Apps	(Gls)
2013–2016	Coton Sport	67	(33)
2016–2017	Altach	30	(6)
2017–2022	Young Boys	158	(30)
2022–2026	Dynamo Moscow	92	(18)
2026–	Pafos	4	(1)

International career^{‡}
2015–	Cameroon	64	(5)
Medal record
Representing Cameroon
Men's football
Africa Cup of Nations
Third place	2021 Cameroon
- * Club domestic league appearances and goals as of 18 September 2026 ‡ National team caps and goals as of 13 November 2025

Nicolas Brice Moumi Ngamaleu (born 9 July 1994) is a Cameroonian professional footballer who plays as a winger for Cypriot First Division club Pafos and the Cameroon national team.

== Club career ==
Ngamaleu was still only 17 when he made his Elite One debut with Coton Sport FC de Garoua. He won three domestic titles in his home land before moving to Austria in 2016. He helped Rheindorf Altach finish fourth in the Austrian league.

He was part of the Young Boys squad that won the 2017–18 Swiss Super League, their first league title for 32 years.

On 8 September 2022, Ngamaleu signed with Dynamo Moscow in Russia for two seasons, with an option to extend.

In the 2023–24 season, Ngamaleu scored two winning goals, both deep in added time against Sochi and Baltika Kaliningrad on 5 May and 11 May respectively, as Dynamo overtook Zenit and Krasnodar to take a 2-point lead in the Russian Premier League table with 2 games to go. On 18 May, he scored an added-time goal in third consecutive game, establishing the final score in a 4–1 victory over Krylia Sovetov.

On 1 June 2024, Dynamo confirmed that the performance-based extension option for the 2024–25 season has been triggered in his contract. On 2 August 2024, Ngamaleu extended his contract with Dynamo for the 2025–26 season, with an option for 2026–27. On 26 June 2026, Ngamaleu left Dynamo as his contract expired.

On 3 August 2026, Ngamaleu signed a two-year contract with Cypriot First Division side Pafos. On 27 August 2026, he scored the decisive go-ahead goal late in extra time of the second leg of the play-offs against Dinamo City to secure a 2026–27 UEFA Conference League league phase spot for Pafos.

== International career ==
Ngamaleu made his debut with the Cameroon national team against Guinea on 28 March 2017. He was included in the Cameroon squad for the 2017 Confederations Cup in Russia.

He placed third with Cameroon at the 2021 Africa Cup of Nations, where he supplied two assists and converted one penalty in the penalty shoot-out against Burkina Faso in the third-place playoff. He started in six out of seven matches and played one half in the last game.

On 10 November 2022 he was selected by Rigobert Song to compete in the 2022 FIFA World Cup.

== Career statistics ==
=== Club ===
As of match played 18 September 2026

Appearances and goals by club, season and competition
Club	Season	League			National cup (Note: Includes Austrian Cup, Swiss Cup, Russian Cup)		Continental		Other		Total	
Club	Season	Division	Apps	Goals	Apps	Goals	Apps	Goals	Apps	Goals	Apps	Goals
SCR Altach	2016–17	Austrian Bundesliga	27	6	0	0	—		—		27	6
SCR Altach	2017–18	Austrian Bundesliga	3	0	1	1	6 (Note: Appearances in UEFA Europa League)	2	—		10	3
SCR Altach	Total		30	6	1	1	6	2	—		37	9
Young Boys	2017–18	Swiss Super League	27	3	5	1	6	1	—		38	5
Young Boys	2018–19	Swiss Super League	32	12	4	1	8 (Note: Appearances in UEFA Champions League)	0	—		44	13
Young Boys	2019–20	Swiss Super League	33	7	6	4	7 (Note: Two appearances in UEFA Champions League, five appearances in UEFA Europa League)	0	—		46	11
Young Boys	2020–21	Swiss Super League	28	3	1	0	11 (Note: Two appearances and one goal in UEFA Champions League, nine appearances in UEFA Europa League)	1	—		40	4
Young Boys	2021–22	Swiss Super League	31	4	1	0	6 (Note: Six appearances and one goal in UEFA Champions League)	1	—		38	5
Young Boys	2022–23	Swiss Super League	7	1	0	0	5 (Note: Appearances UEFA Conference League)	0	—		12	1
Young Boys	Total		158	30	17	6	43	3	—		218	39
Dynamo Moscow	2022–23	Russian Premier League	19	2	6	0	—		—		25	2
Dynamo Moscow	2023–24	Russian Premier League	26	6	7	1	—		—		33	7
Dynamo Moscow	2024–25	Russian Premier League	26	6	4	0	—		—		30	6
Dynamo Moscow	2025–26	Russian Premier League	21	4	8	2	—		—		29	6
Dynamo Moscow	Total		92	18	25	3	—		—		117	21
Pafos	2026–27	Cypriot First Division	3	0	0	0	3 (Note: One appearance in UEFA Europa League, two appearances in UEFA Conference League)	0	1 (Note: Appearance in Cypriot Super Cup)	0	7	0
Career total			283	54	43	10	52	5	1	0	379	69

=== International ===
As of match played 13 November 2025

Appearances and goals by national team and year
National team	Year	Apps	Goals
Cameroon	2015	1	0
Cameroon	2016	5	2
Cameroon	2017	9	0
Cameroon	2018	1	0
Cameroon	2019	3	1
Cameroon	2020	3	0
Cameroon	2021	10	1
Cameroon	2022	12	0
Cameroon	2023	6	0
Cameroon	2024	8	0
Cameroon	2025	6	1
Total		64	5

Scores and results list Cameroon's goal tally first, score column indicates score after each Ngamaleu goal.

List of international goals scored by Moumi Ngamaleu
No.	Date	Venue	Opponent	Score	Result	Competition
1	6 January 2016	Umuganda Stadium, Gisenyi, Rwanda	Rwanda	1–1	1–1	Friendly
2	25 January 2016	Stade Huye, Butare, Rwanda	DR Congo	2–1	3–1	2016 African Nations Championship
3	17 November 2019	Stade Régional Nyamirambo, Kigali, Rwanda	Rwanda	1–0	1–0	2021 Africa Cup of Nations qualification
4	6 September 2021	Stade National de la Côte d'Ivoire, Abidjan, Ivory Coast	Ivory Coast	2–1	2–1	2022 FIFA World Cup qualification
5	8 October 2025	Côte d'Or National Sports Complex, Saint Pierre, Mauritius	Mauritius	1–0	2–0	2026 FIFA World Cup qualification

== Honours ==
Coton Sport

- Elite One: 2013, 2014, 2015

Young Boys

- Swiss Super League: 2017–18, 2018–19, 2019–20, 2020–21
- Swiss Cup: 2019–20

Pafos

- Cypriot Super Cup: 2026

Cameroon

- Africa Cup of Nations Bronze: 2021

Individual

- Swiss Super League Team of the Year: 2019–20

== See also ==
- List of FC Dynamo Moscow players
