= Daniil Fomin =

Russian footballer (born 1997)

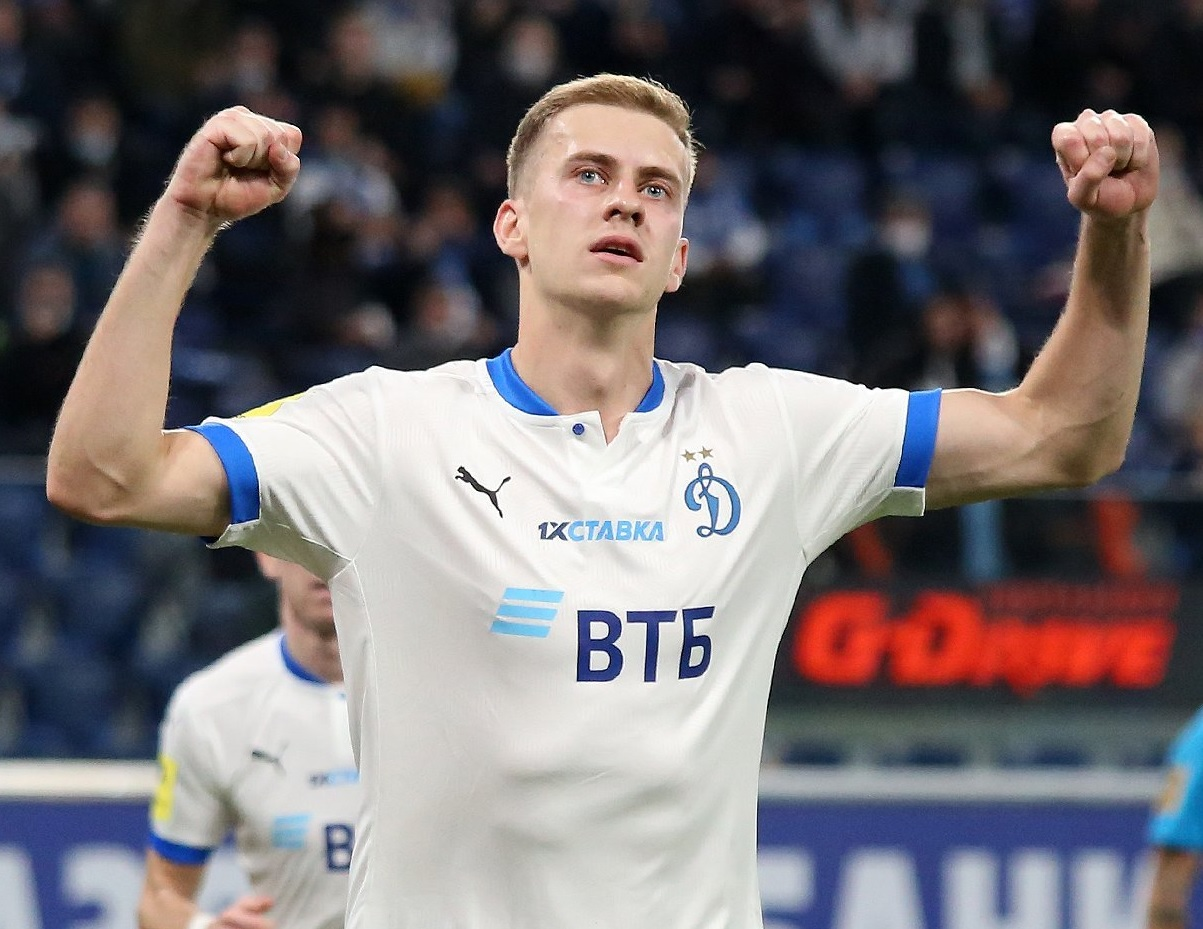
- Fomin with Dynamo Moscow in 2021

Personal information
- Full name: Daniil Dmitriyevich Fomin
- Date of birth: 2 March 1997 (age 29)
- Place of birth: Tikhoretsk, Russia
- Height: 1.87 m (6 ft 2 in)
- Position: Midfielder

Team information
- Current team: Dynamo Moscow
- Number: 74

Youth career
- 2003–2009: Altair Tikhoretsk
- 2009–2017: Krasnodar

Senior career*
Years	Team	Apps	(Gls)
2014–2017	Krasnodar-2	53	(7)
2016–2019	Krasnodar	0	(0)
2017–2019	→ Nizhny Novgorod (loan)	62	(6)
2019–2020	Ufa	27	(6)
2020–	Dynamo Moscow	177	(31)

International career^{‡}
2015–2016	Russia U-19	6	(0)
2017–2018	Russia U-21	10	(1)
2020–	Russia	19	(1)
- * Club domestic league appearances and goals as of 22 November 2026 ‡ National team caps and goals as of 27 March 2026

Daniil Dmitriyevich Fomin (Russian: Дании́л Дми́триевич Фоми́н; born 2 March 1997) is a Russian professional footballer who plays as a defensive midfielder for Dynamo Moscow and the Russia national team.

== Club career ==
=== Krasnodar ===
Fomin made his debut in the Russian Professional Football League for FC Krasnodar-2 on 7 October 2014 in a game against FC Torpedo Armavir. He made his debut for the main squad of FC Krasnodar in the Russian Cup game against PFC Spartak Nalchik on 21 September 2016.

=== Ufa ===
On 26 June 2019, Fomin signed a contract with FC Ufa. He made his debut in the Russian Premier League for FC Ufa on 14 July 2019 in a game against FC Ural Yekaterinburg and scored a goal on his debut in a 2–3 loss.

=== Dynamo Moscow ===
On 3 August 2020, Fomin signed a 5-year contract with FC Dynamo Moscow.

On 29 May 2022, Fomin missed the penalty kick in the 2022 Russian Cup Final against FC Spartak Moscow deep in added time that would have equalized the score. Before that kick, he converted 23 consecutive penalty kick attempts in his career, and 25 out of 26 overall.

On 10 September 2024, Fomin extended his contract with Dynamo to 2029.

== International career ==
He was called up to the Russia national football team for the first time for the UEFA Euro 2020 qualifying matches against Belgium and San Marino in November 2019. He made his debut on 11 October 2020 in a Nations League game against Turkey.

On 11 May 2021, he was included in the preliminary extended 30-man squad for UEFA Euro 2020. On 2 June 2021, he was included in the final squad. He did not appear in any games as Russia was eliminated at group stage.

== Career statistics ==
=== Club ===
As of match played 22 November 2026

Appearances and goals by club, season and competition
Club	Season	League			Russian Cup		Europe		Other		Total	
Club	Season	Division	Apps	Goals	Apps	Goals	Apps	Goals	Apps	Goals	Apps	Goals
Krasnodar-2	2014–15	Russian Second League	9	1	—		—		—		9	1
Krasnodar-2	2015–16	Russian Second League	20	2	—		—		4 (Note: Appearances in the FNL Cup)	1	24	3
Krasnodar-2	2016–17	Russian Second League	24	4	—		—		1	0	25	4
Krasnodar-2	Total		53	7	0	0	0	0	5	1	58	8
Krasnodar	2016–17	Russian Premier League	0	0	1	0	0	0	—		1	0
Nizhny Novgorod (loan)	2017–18	Russian First League	31	3	3	0	—		—		34	3
Nizhny Novgorod (loan)	2018–19	Russian First League	31	3	3	0	—		2 (Note: Appearances in the promotion play-offs)	2	36	5
Nizhny Novgorod (loan)	Total		62	6	6	0	0	0	2	2	70	8
Ufa	2019–20	Russian Premier League	27	6	2	0	—		—		29	6
Dynamo Moscow	2020–21	Russian Premier League	29	6	2	1	1 (Note: Appearance in the UEFA Europa League)	0	—		32	7
Dynamo Moscow	2021–22	Russian Premier League	29	10	6	2	—		—		35	12
Dynamo Moscow	2022–23	Russian Premier League	28	5	10	0	—		—		38	5
Dynamo Moscow	2023–24	Russian Premier League	25	1	9	2	—		—		34	3
Dynamo Moscow	2024–25	Russian Premier League	26	5	8	1	—		—		34	6
Dynamo Moscow	2025–26	Russian Premier League	27	2	11	2	—		—		38	4
Dynamo Moscow	2026–27	Russian Premier League	13	2	2	0	—		—		15	2
Dynamo Moscow	Total		177	31	48	8	1	0	0	0	226	39
Career total			319	50	57	8	1	0	7	3	384	61

=== International ===
As of match played 27 March 2026

Appearances and goals by national team and year
National team	Year	Apps	Goals
Russia	2020	3	0
Russia	2021	5	0
Russia	2022	3	0
Russia	2023	4	0
Russia	2024	1	0
Russia	2025	2	1
Russia	2026	1	0
Total		19	1

==== International goals ====
No.	Date	Venue	Opponent	Score	Result	Competition
1.	19 March 2025	VTB Arena, Moscow, Russia	Grenada	4–0	5–0	Friendly
