= Yaroslav Gladyshev =

Russian football player

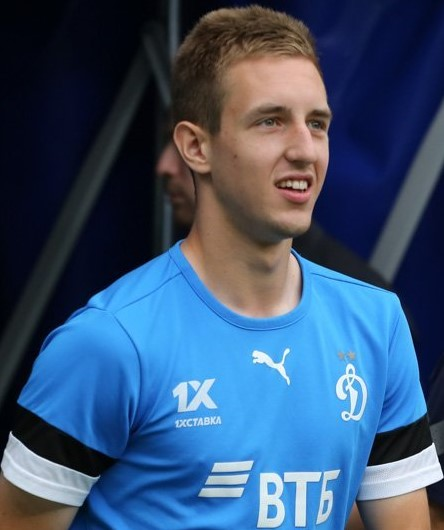
- Gladyshev with Dynamo Moscow in 2022

Personal information
- Full name: Yaroslav Vadimovich Gladyshev
- Date of birth: 5 May 2003 (age 23)
- Place of birth: Kirov, Russia
- Height: 1.80 m (5 ft 11 in)
- Position: Forward

Team information
- Current team: Dynamo Moscow
- Number: 91

Youth career
- 2007–2016: Konoplyov football academy
- 2016–2020: Dynamo Moscow

Senior career*
Years	Team	Apps	(Gls)
2020–2022	Dynamo-2 Moscow	26	(14)
2021–	Dynamo Moscow	112	(21)

International career^{‡}
2019–2020	Russia U17	4	(3)
2021	Russia U18	2	(1)
2021	Russia U19	8	(5)
2022	Russia U21	2	(0)
2025–	Russia	5	(4)
- * Club domestic league appearances and goals as of 22 November 2026 ‡ National team caps and goals as of 17 November 2026

Yaroslav Vadimovich Gladyshev (Russian: Ярослав Вадимович Гладышев; born 5 May 2003) is a Russian football player who plays as a right winger or centre-forward for Russian Premier League club Dynamo Moscow and the Russia national team.

== Club career ==
He made his debut for the main team of Dynamo Moscow on 22 September 2021 in a Russian Cup game against Dynamo Stavropol. He scored his team's fifth goal in a 6–0 victory. He made his Russian Premier League debut for Dynamo on 22 October 2021 against Khimki.

On 15 December 2022, Gladyshev extended his contract with Dynamo until 2026.

Gladyshev was selected Russian Premier League's player of the month for April 2025 after scoring four goals during the month.

On 17 June 2025, Gladyshev extended his Dynamo contract to 2030.

== International career ==
Gladyshev was first called up to the Russia national football team for a training camp in September 2023.

Gladyshev made his debut for the senior national team on 6 June 2025 in a friendly against Nigeria. In his second game four days later, he scored 4 goals in a friendly against Belarus.

== Personal life ==
His father Vadim Gladyshev also played football professionally, he appeared in the Russian Premier League for FC Lada-Tolyatti.

== Career statistics ==
=== Club ===
As of match played 22 November 2026

Appearances and goals by club, season and competition
Club	Season	League			Cup		Total	
Club	Season	Division	Apps	Goals	Apps	Goals	Apps	Goals
Dynamo-2 Moscow	2020–21	Russian Second League	15	7	—		15	7
Dynamo-2 Moscow	2021–22	Russian Second League	11	7	—		11	7
Dynamo-2 Moscow	Total		26	14	0	0	26	14
Dynamo Moscow	2021–22	Russian Premier League	7	0	2	1	9	1
Dynamo Moscow	2022–23	Russian Premier League	26	5	9	2	35	7
Dynamo Moscow	2023–24	Russian Premier League	14	2	9	2	23	4
Dynamo Moscow	2024–25	Russian Premier League	28	10	11	3	39	13
Dynamo Moscow	2025–26	Russian Premier League	22	1	9	0	31	1
Dynamo Moscow	2026–27	Russian Premier League	15	3	4	2	19	5
Dynamo Moscow	Total		112	21	44	10	156	31
Career total			138	35	44	10	182	45

=== International ===
As of match played 17 November 2026

Appearances and goals by national team and year
National team	Year	Apps	Goals
Russia	2025	2	4
Russia	2026	3	0
Total		5	4

==== International goals ====
Scores and results list Russia's goal tally first.

No.	Date	Venue	Opponent	Score	Result	Competition
1.	10 June 2025	Dinamo Stadium, Minsk, Belarus	Belarus	1–0	4–1	Friendly
2.	10 June 2025	Dinamo Stadium, Minsk, Belarus	Belarus	2–0	4–1	Friendly
3.	10 June 2025	Dinamo Stadium, Minsk, Belarus	Belarus	3–0	4–1	Friendly
4.	10 June 2025	Dinamo Stadium, Minsk, Belarus	Belarus	4–0	4–1	Friendly

== Honours ==
=== Individual ===
- Russian Premier League Player of the Month: April 2025.
