= 2024–25 FC Dynamo Moscow season =

FC Dynamo Moscow
2024–25 season
- Stadium: VTB Arena
- Russian Premier League: 5th
- Russian Cup: Quarter-finals
- Average home league attendance: 13,179

The 2024–25 season was the 102nd season in the history of FC Dynamo Moscow, and the club's eighth consecutive season in the Russian Premier League. In addition to the domestic league, the club participated in the Russian Cup.

== Transfers ==
=== In ===
Pos.	Player	Transferred from	Fee	Date	Source
FW	(Morocco) El Mehdi Maouhoub	(Morocco) Raja Club Athletic	€1,800,000	29 July 2024	

== Friendlies ==
=== Pre-season ===
30 June 2024 Friendly	Dynamo Moscow (Russia)	0–3	(Russia) Akhmat Groznyi
17:00

3 July 2024 Friendly	Dynamo Moscow (Russia)	2–2 (2–4 p)	(Serbia) FK Partizan
19:30

6 July 2024 Friendly	Dynamo Moscow (Russia)	v	(Russia) Rodina Moscow
10:30

6 July 2024 Friendly	Dynamo Moscow (Russia)	2–0	(Serbia) OFK Beograd
15:30

12 July 2024 Friendly	Dynamo Moscow (Russia)	1–1 (5–4 p)	(Russia) Spartak Moscow
17:30 UTC+3

== Competitions ==
=== Overall record ===
Competition	First match	Last match	Starting round	Record							
Competition	First match	Last match	Starting round	Pld	W	D	L	GF	GA	GD	Win %
Russian Premier League	20 July 2024	24 May 2025	Matchday 1	1	1	0	0	3	1	+2	100.00
Russian Cup	30 July–1 August 2024			0	0	0	0	0	0	+0	—
Total				1	1	0	0	3	1	+2	100.00

Last updated: 20 July 2024
Source: Soccerway

=== Russian Premier League ===
==== League table ====
Pos	Team	Pld	W	D	L	GF	GA	GD	Pts
3	CSKA Moscow	30	17	8	5	47	21	+26	59
4	Spartak Moscow	30	17	6	7	56	25	+31	57
5	Dynamo Moscow	30	16	8	6	61	35	+26	56
6	Lokomotiv Moscow	30	15	8	7	51	41	+10	53
7	Rubin Kazan	30	13	6	11	42	45	−3	45

Source: Premier Liga
Rules for classification: 1) Points; 2) Head-to-head points; 3) Head-to-head matches won; 4) Head-to-head goal difference; 5) Head-to-head goals scored; 6) Matches won; 7) Goal difference; 8) Goals scored; 9) 2023–24 position (not applicable to final standings); 10) Play-off. Note: if teams tied on points did not play an equal number of head-to-head games, head-to-head results are not considered for the standings.

==== Results summary ====
Overall								Home						Away					
Pld	W	D	L	GF	GA	GD	Pts	W	D	L	GF	GA	GD	W	D	L	GF	GA	GD
1	1	0	0	3	1	+2	3	1	0	0	3	1	+2	0	0	0	0	0	0

Last updated: 20 July 2024.

==== Results by round ====
Round	1	2
Ground	H	H
Result	W	
Position	2	

Updated to match(es) played on 20 July 2024. Source:
A = Away; H = Home; W = Win; D = Draw; L = Loss

==== Matches ====
The match schedule was released on 20 June 2024.

20 July 2024 1	Dynamo Moscow	3–1	Fakel Voronezh	Moscow
20:00 MSK (UTC+3)	Lepsky 3'; Majstorović (yellow card) 20'; Moumi Ngamaleu 21'; Gladyshev 28', (yellow card) 56'; Bessmertny (yellow card) 31'; Fomin (red card) 40'; Lunev (yellow card) 82'; Dasa (yellow card) 85'	Report	Kvekveskiri (yellow card) 16'; Bryzgalov (yellow card) 38'; Ilyin (yellow card) 46'; Moțpan (yellow card) 64'; Markov 74'	Stadium: VTB Arena; Attendance: 11,117; Referee: Kirill Levnikov

27 July 2024 2	Dynamo Moscow	v	Lokomotiv Moscow	Moscow
17:30 MSK (UTC+3)				Stadium: VTB Arena
