= 2020–21 FC Dynamo Moscow season =

FC Dynamo Moscow
2020–21 season
- Chairman: Klochko Igor Petrovich
- Manager: Kirill Novikov (until 29 September); Alyaksandr Kulchy (caretaker) (29 September - 14 October); Sandro Schwarz (from 14 October)
- Stadium: VTB Arena
- Premier League: 7th
- Russian Cup: Quarter-final vs Krylia Sovetov
- UEFA Europa League: Second qualifying round vs Locomotive Tbilisi
- Top goalscorer: League: Daniil Fomin (6); All: Daniil Fomin (7)
- Highest home attendance: 12,567 vs Spartak Moscow (13 March 2021)
- Lowest home attendance: 4,512 vs Akhmat Grozny (21 September 2020)
- Average home league attendance: 7,797 (16 May 2021)
| Home colours | Away colours |

The 2020–21 Dynamo Moscow season was the club's 98th season and fourth season back in the Russian Premier League, following their relegation at the end of the 2015–16 season. Dynamo Moscow finished the season in 7th place and where knocked out of the Russian Cup by Krylia Sovetov in the Quarterfinals and the UEFA Europa League by Locomotive Tbilisi at the Second Qualifying Round stage.

== Season events ==
On 3 August, Dynamo announced the signing of Daniil Fomin from Ufa. The following day, 4 August, Dynamo announced that they had activated the clause in their loan deal with Ufa to make Sylvester Igboun's transfer permanent.

On 17 August, Dynamo announced the signing of Nikola Moro from Dinamo Zagreb.

On 7 September, Dynamo announced the signing of Daniil Lesovoy from Arsenal Tula.

On 29 September, Kirill Novikov resigned as manager, with Alyaksandr Kulchy being appointed as caretaker manager. On 14 October, Sandro Schwarz was appointed as Dynamo's new permanent manager, with ex-Dynamo forward Andriy Voronin joining as an assistant coach.

On 15 October, Dynamo Moscow re-signed Roman Neustädter on a contract until the end of the season, after the defender had previously left the club when his contract expired at the end of the previous season. Two days later, 17 October, Guillermo Varela joined on loan for the remainder of the season from Copenhagen.

== Squad ==
Note: Flags indicate national team as defined under FIFA eligibility rules; some limited exceptions apply. Players may hold more than one non-FIFA nationality.

| No. | Pos. | Nation | Player |
|---|---|---|---|
| 1 | GK | RUS | Anton Shunin |
| 2 | DF | URU | Guillermo Varela |
| 3 | DF | RUS | Zaurbek Pliyev |
| 4 | DF | RUS | Sergei Parshivlyuk |
| 5 | DF | PAR | Fabián Balbuena |
| 7 | DF | RUS | Dmitri Skopintsev |
| 8 | MF | CRO | Nikola Moro |
| 9 | FW | CMR | Clinton N'Jie |
| 15 | DF | RUS | Saba Sazonov |
| 16 | GK | RUS | Ivan Budachyov |
| 18 | DF | UKR | Ivan Ordets |
| 19 | FW | RUS | Daniil Lesovoy |
| 20 | FW | RUS | Vyacheslav Grulyov |
| 24 | DF | RUS | Roman Yevgenyev |

| No. | Pos. | Nation | Player |
|---|---|---|---|
| 25 | MF | RUS | Denis Makarov |
| 26 | DF | RUS | Grigori Morozov |
| 30 | MF | RUS | Anton Terekhov |
| 31 | GK | RUS | Igor Leshchuk |
| 40 | FW | RUS | Fyodor Smolov |
| 47 | MF | RUS | Arsen Zakharyan |
| 50 | DF | RUS | Aleksandr Kutitsky |
| 53 | MF | POL | Sebastian Szymański |
| 70 | FW | RUS | Konstantin Tyukavin |
| 74 | MF | RUS | Daniil Fomin |
| 90 | MF | RUS | Vladislav Galkin |
| 91 | FW | RUS | Yaroslav Gladyshev |
| 93 | DF | URU | Diego Laxalt |

=== Out on loan ===
Note: Flags indicate national team as defined under FIFA eligibility rules; some limited exceptions apply. Players may hold more than one non-FIFA nationality.

| No. | Pos. | Nation | Player |
|---|---|---|---|
| — | DF | RUS | Sergei Slepov (at Rotor Volgograd) |
| — | MF | GEO | Luka Gagnidze (at Ural Yekaterinburg) |
| — | MF | RUS | Ilya Gomanyuk (at Volgar Astrakhan) |
| — | MF | RUS | Vladislav Karapuzov (at Akhmat Grozny) |

| No. | Pos. | Nation | Player |
|---|---|---|---|
| — | MF | RUS | Igor Shkolik (at Rotor Volgograd) |
| — | FW | RUS | Maksim Danilin (at Neftekhimik Nizhnekamsk) |
| — | FW | RUS | Nikolay Komlichenko (at Rostov) |

== Transfers ==
=== In ===
| Date | Position | Nationality | Name | From | Fee | Ref. |
|---|---|---|---|---|---|---|
| 3 August 2020 | MF | (Russia) | Daniil Fomin | Ufa | Undisclosed | |
| 4 August 2020 | FW | (Nigeria) | Sylvester Igboun | Ufa | Undisclosed | |
| 17 August 2020 | MF | (Croatia) | Nikola Moro | Dinamo Zagreb | Undisclosed | |
| 7 September 2020 | MF | (Russia) | Daniil Lesovoy | Arsenal Tula | Undisclosed | |
| 15 October 2020 | DF | (Russia) | Roman Neustädter | Dynamo Moscow | Free | |

=== Loans in ===
| Date from | Position | Nationality | Name | From | Date to | Ref. |
|---|---|---|---|---|---|---|
| 17 October 2020 | DF | (Uruguay) | Guillermo Varela | Copenhagen | End of season | |

=== Out ===
| Date | Position | Nationality | Name | To | Fee | Ref. |
|---|---|---|---|---|---|---|
| 15 September 2020 | DF | (Bosnia and Herzegovina) | Toni Šunjić | Beijing Sinobo Guoan | Undisclosed | |
| 6 October 2020 | FW | (Russia) | Yevgeni Markov | Krasnodar | Undisclosed | |

=== Loans out ===
| Date from | Position | Nationality | Name | To | Date to | Ref. |
|---|---|---|---|---|---|---|
| 21 February 2020 | DF | (Russia) | Ihor Kalinin | Ural Yekaterinburg | End of season | |
| 11 August 2020 | DF | (Russia) | Danil Lipovoy | Khimki | 24 December 2020 | |
| 18 August 2020 | MF | (Portugal) | Miguel Cardoso | Belenenses SAD | End of season | |
| 2 October 2020 | FW | (Germany) | Maximilian Philipp | VfL Wolfsburg | End of season | |
| 17 October 2020 | DF | (Russia) | Grigori Morozov | Ufa | End of season | |

=== Released ===
| Date | Position | Nationality | Name | Joined | Date | Ref |
|---|---|---|---|---|---|---|
| 8 September 2020 | FW | (Lithuania) | Fedor Černych | Jagiellonia Białystok | 17 September 2020 | |
| 19 December 2020 | MF | (Russia) | Konstantin Rausch | 1. FC Nürnberg | | |
| 31 December 2020 | GK | (Russia) | Ilya Kuptsov | | | |
| 31 December 2020 | GK | (Russia) | Yevgeni Figurov | | | |
| 31 December 2020 | GK | (Russia) | Arsen Dzhioyev | | | |
| 31 December 2020 | GK | (Russia) | Stanislav Latsevich | | | |
| 30 June 2021 | DF | (Russia) | Roman Neustädter | | | |
| 30 June 2021 | MF | (Burkina Faso) | Charles Kaboré | | | |
| 30 June 2021 | MF | (Russia) | Danil Lipovoy | Krylia Sovetov Samara | 23 June 2021 | |
| 30 June 2021 | MF | (Russia) | Vladimir Moskvichyov | Neftekhimik Nizhnekamsk | 9 July 2021 | |

== Friendlies ==
| 2 August 2020 | Khimki | 2 – 0 | Dynamo Moscow | Khimki |
| 17:00 MSK (UTC+3) | Martusevich (yellow card) 57'; Konaté 62', 72'; Troshechkin (yellow card) 75' | Report | Ordets (yellow card) 19'; Markov (yellow card) 43' | Stadium: Arena Khimki; Attendance: 0 Referee: Oleg Koretsky |
Note: Match played behind closed doors.

| 17 January 2021 | Lech Poznań | 2 – 0 | Dynamo Moscow | Belek, Turkey |
| 17:00 MSK (UTC+3) | Awaed (yellow card) 13'; Skóraś 21'; Kamiński 38' | Report | Kaboré (yellow card) 35' | Stadium: Regnum Carya; Attendance: 50 |

| 21 January 2021 | Raków Częstochowa | 0 – 2 | Dynamo Moscow | Belek, Turkey |
| 17:00 MSK (UTC+3) | | Report | Grulyov 1'; Yevgenyev (yellow card) 17'; Komlichenko 75' | Stadium: Regnum Carya; Attendance: 50 |

| 29 January 2021 | Aktobe | 2 – 2 | Dynamo Moscow | Belek, Turkey |
| 17:00 MSK (UTC+3) | Samorodov 38'; R.Temirkhan (yellow card) 41'; Balashov 62' | Report | Ordets (yellow card) 28'; Karapuzov 27'; Tyukavin 49' | Stadium: Regnum Carya |

| 30 January 2021 | Slovan Bratislava | 2 – 4 | Dynamo Moscow | Belek, Turkey |
| 17:00 MSK (UTC+3) | Daniel 8'; Moha (penalty missed) 51', 52' de Kamps (yellow card) 41' (yellow-red card) 71' | Report | Grulyov 20'; Lipovoy 32'; Kaboré (yellow card) 47'; Zakharyan 48'; Moskvichyov (yellow card) 66'; Moro (yellow card) 80'; Tyukavin 88' | Stadium: Regnum Carya |

| 2 February 2021 | Rudar Pljevlja | 1 – 3 | Dynamo Moscow | Belek, Turkey |
| 15:00 MSK (UTC+3) | Vukotic (yellow card) 70'; D.Talović 85' | Report | Tyukavin 72', 81', 83' | Stadium: Regnum Carya |

| 4 February 2021 | Kairat | 0 – 2 | Dynamo Moscow | Belek, Turkey |
| 13:00 MSK (UTC+3) | Kosović (yellow card) 39'; Mikanović (yellow card) 51'; Polyakov (yellow card) 79' | Report | Yevgenyev (yellow card) 19'; Igboun 40'; Neustädter 48'; Moskvichyov (yellow card) 54' | Stadium: Regnum Carya |

| 5 February 2021 | Dynamo Moscow | 3 – 2 | Rubin Kazan | Belek, Turkey |
| 14:30 MSK (UTC+3) | Szymański 18'; Fomin 41' (pen.); Slepov (yellow card) 45+2'; Pliyev (yellow card) 51' (yellow-red card) 52'; Komlichenko 90+3' | Report | Medvedev (yellow card) 41'; Despotović 45+3' (pen.), 53'; Shatov (yellow card) 57'; Kostyukov (yellow card) 90+2' |

== Competitions ==
=== Overview ===
| Competition | First match | Last match | Starting round | Final position | Record | | | | | | | |
| Competition | First match | Last match | Starting round | Final position | Pld | W | D | L | GF | GA | GD | Win % |
|---|---|---|---|---|---|---|---|---|---|---|---|---|
| Premier League | 10 August 2020 | 16 May 2021 | Matchday 1 | | 30 | 15 | 5 | 10 | 44 | 32 | +12 | 50.00 |
| Russian Cup | 20 February 2021 | 8 April 2021 | Round of 32 | Quarterfinal | 2 | 1 | 0 | 1 | 2 | 2 | +0 | 50.00 |
| UEFA Europa League | 17 September 2020 | 17 September 2020 | 2QR | 2QR | 1 | 0 | 0 | 1 | 1 | 2 | −1 | 0.00 |
| Total | | | | | 33 | 16 | 5 | 12 | 47 | 36 | +11 | 48.48 |

Last updated: 16 May 2021
Source: Competitions

=== Premier League ===
==== Results summary ====
| Overall | | | | | | | | Home | | | | | | Away | | | | | |
| Pld | W | D | L | GF | GA | GD | Pts | W | D | L | GF | GA | GD | W | D | L | GF | GA | GD |
|---|---|---|---|---|---|---|---|---|---|---|---|---|---|---|---|---|---|---|---|
| 30 | 15 | 5 | 10 | 44 | 33 | +11 | 50 | 10 | 2 | 3 | 27 | 10 | +17 | 5 | 3 | 7 | 17 | 23 | −6 |

Last updated: 16 May 2021.
Source: See Results

==== Results by round ====
| Round | 1 | 2 | 3 | 4 | 5 | 6 | 7 | 8 | 9 | 10 | 11 | 12 | 13 | 14 | 15 | 16 | 17 | 18 | 19 | 20 | 21 | 22 | 23 | 24 | 25 | 26 | 27 | 28 | 29 | 30 |
|---|---|---|---|---|---|---|---|---|---|---|---|---|---|---|---|---|---|---|---|---|---|---|---|---|---|---|---|---|---|---|
| Ground | A | H | H | A | H | A | H | H | A | H | A | H | A | H | A | A | H | A | A | A | H | H | A | H | H | A | H | A | A | H |
| Result | W | D | W | L | W | D | L | W | L | W | L | W | W | W | D | L | W | L | L | W | W | L | W | W | D | W | L | L | D | W |
| Position | 5 | 5 | 2 | 5 | 4 | 4 | 5 | 6 | 9 | 6 | 8 | 5 | 4 | 4 | 4 | 5 | 4 | 5 | 6 | 6 | 5 | 7 | 6 | 5 | 6 | 6 | 7 | 7 | 7 | 7 |

Updated to match(es) played on 16 May 2021. Source: Premier Liga
A = Away; H = Home; W = Win; D = Draw; L = Loss

==== Results ====
| 10 August 2020 1 | Ural Yekaterinburg | 0 – 2 | Dynamo Moscow | Yekaterinburg |
| 17:00 MSK (UTC+3) | Yegorychev (yellow card) 22'; Haroyan (yellow card) 77'; Aratore (yellow card) 90+4' | Report | N'Jie 38'; Parshivlyuk (yellow card) 48'; Igboun 59'; Philipp (yellow card) 72'; Slepov (yellow card) 90+1' | Stadium: Central Stadium; Attendance: 3,420; Referee: Vitaly Meshkov |

| 15 August 2020 2 | Dynamo Moscow | 0 – 0 | Rotor Volgograd | Moscow |
| 15:30 MSK (UTC+3) | Igboun (yellow card) 45'; N'Jie (yellow card) 70'; Kaboré (yellow card) 77' | Report | Makarov (yellow card) 23'; Gogoua (yellow card) 45+'; Kozhemyakin (yellow card) 51'; Zhigulyov (yellow card) 71'; Sultonov (yellow card) 75' | Stadium: VTB Arena; Attendance: 5,981; Referee: Igor Panin |

| 19 August 2020 3 | Dynamo Moscow | 2 – 0 | Rostov | Moscow |
| 19:00 MSK (UTC+3) | N'Jie (yellow card) 34'; Philipp 42' (pen.); Komlichenko 45'; Parshivlyuk (yellow card) 60'; Moro (yellow card) 90+4' | Report | Zaynutdinov (yellow card) 16'; Normann (yellow card) 34'; Shomurodov (yellow card) 54' | Stadium: VTB Arena; Attendance: 5,789; Referee: Nikolay Voloshin |

| 22 August 2020 4 | Arsenal Tula | 2 – 0 | Dynamo Moscow | Tula |
| 17:30 MSK (UTC+3) | Lesovoy 23', 74' (pen.); Čaušić (yellow card) 38'; Bauer (yellow card) 58'; Gromyko (yellow card) 62'; E.Kangwa (yellow card) 65' | Report | Fomin (yellow card) 35'; Yevgenyev (yellow card) 80'; Grulyov (yellow card) 83' | Stadium: Arsenal Stadium; Attendance: 1,897; Referee: Vladimir Moskalyov |

| 26 August 2020 5 | Dynamo Moscow | 1 – 0 | Zenit St.Petersburg | Moscow |
| 20:45 MSK (UTC+3) | Šunjić 40'; Szymański (yellow card) 53'; Parshivlyuk (yellow card) 66'; Skopintsev (red card) 73'; Moro (yellow card) 79'; Pliyev (yellow card) 85'; Yevgenyev (yellow card) 87'; Kaboré (yellow card) 89'; Shunin (yellow card) 90+' | Report | Karavayev (yellow card) 39'; Barrios (yellow card) 49' (yellow-red card) 83'; Rigoni (yellow card) 90+'; Lovren (yellow card) FT | Stadium: VTB Arena; Attendance: 5,885; Referee: Stanislav Vasiliev |

| 30 August 2020 6 | Ufa | 1 – 1 | Dynamo Moscow | Ufa |
| 14:00 MSK (UTC+3) | Zhamaletdinov (yellow card) 12' (goal) 59'; Aliyev (yellow card) 43' | Report | N'Jie 43'; Kaboré (yellow card) 88' | Stadium: Neftyanik Stadium; Attendance: 2,936; Referee: Evgeny Turbin |

| 13 September 2020 7 | Dynamo Moscow | 0 – 1 | Rubin Kazan | Moscow |
| 16:30 MSK (UTC+3) | Ordets (yellow card) 2'; Parshivlyuk (yellow card) 35' (yellow-red card) 90+'; Komlichenko (yellow card) 47' (yellow-red card) 51'; Philipp (yellow card) 54' | Report | Despotović 31' (pen.); Hwang (yellow card) 31' (yellow-red card) 90+'; Makarov (yellow card) 67'; Merkulov (yellow card) 90' | Stadium: VTB Arena; Attendance: 5,723; Referee: Sergey Lapochkin |

| 21 September 2020 8 | Dynamo Moscow | 1 – 0 | Akhmat Grozny | Moscow |
| 19:00 MSK (UTC+3) | Shvets (yellow card) 27'; Ilyin (yellow card) 48'; Bogosavac (yellow card) 76' (yellow-red card) 80'; Timofeyev (yellow card) 82' | Report | Slepov (yellow card) 31'; Grulyov (yellow card) 66'; Lesovoy (yellow card) 87'; Ordets 90+' (yellow card) 90+' | Stadium: VTB Arena; Attendance: 4,512; Referee: Mikhail Vilkov |

| 28 September 2020 9 | Khimki | 1 – 0 | Dynamo Moscow | Khimki |
| 19:00 MSK (UTC+3) | Kuat (yellow card) 9'; Lomovitsky 19'; Kukharchuk (yellow card) 57'; Danilkin (yellow card) 67'; Idowu (yellow card) 85'; Tikhiy (yellow card) 90' | Report | Yevgenyev (yellow card) 42'; Fomin (yellow card) 43'; Skopintsev (yellow card) 64' | Stadium: Arena Khimki; Attendance: 2,732; Referee: Sergey Ivanov |

| 4 October 2020 10 | Dynamo Moscow | 2 – 0 | Krasnodar | Moscow |
| 20:00 MSK (UTC+3) | N'Jie (yellow card) 6'; Grulyov 37'; Parshivlyuk (yellow card) 41'; Szymański (yellow card) 45+'; Lesovoy 57' (yellow card) 75' | Report | Smolnikov (yellow card) 47'; Kaio (yellow card) 66'; Gazinsky (yellow card) 74' | Stadium: VTB Arena; Attendance: 6,076; Referee: Kirill Levnikov |

| 18 October 2020 11 | CSKA Moscow | 3 – 1 | Dynamo Moscow | Moscow |
| 18:30 MSK (UTC+3) | Oblyakov (yellow card) 35'; Kuchayev 51'; Ejuke 54'; Diveyev 68' | Report | Grulyov (yellow card) 16'; Yevgenyev (yellow card) 40' (yellow-red card) 75'; Fomin (yellow card) 53'; Moro 57' | Stadium: VEB Arena; Attendance: 6,999; Referee: Vladislav Bezborodov |

| 24 October 2020 12 | Dynamo Moscow | 3 – 1 | Sochi | Moscow |
| 14:00 MSK (UTC+3) | Lesovoy 11'; Szymański 26'; Ordets (yellow card) 28'; Komlichenko (yellow card) 45+'; Kaboré (yellow card) 48'; Grulyov (yellow card) 49'; Fomin 55' | Report | Mevlja 22'; Miladinović (yellow card) 35'; Yusupov (yellow card) 38'; Tsallagov (yellow card) 44' (yellow-red card) 87' | Stadium: VTB Arena; Attendance: 4,535; Referee: Alexey Sukhoi |

| 1 November 2020 13 | Tambov | 1 – 2 | Dynamo Moscow | Saransk |
| 19:00 MSK (UTC+3) | Kapliyenko (yellow card) 2'; Kilin (yellow card) 44' (yellow-red card) 54'; Karasyov (yellow card) 57'; Tetrashvili (red card) 60'; Onugkha 64' (pen.) (penalty missed) 90+'; Shlyakov (yellow card) 90+' | Report | Szymański (yellow card) 6'; Lesovoy 8'; Neustädter (yellow card) 32'; Ordets (yellow card) 63'; Komlichenko 90+' (yellow card) 90+' | Stadium: Mordovia Arena; Attendance: 2,091; Referee: Sergei Karasev |
Note: Match played at the Mordovia Arena in Saransk instead of Tambov's regular Spartak Stadium.

| 8 November 2020 14 | Dynamo Moscow | 5 – 1 | Lokomotiv Moscow | Moscow |
| 19:00 MSK (UTC+3) | Yevgenyev 3'; Pliyev (yellow card) 24'; Szymański (yellow card) 28'; N'Jie 33'; Parshivlyuk (yellow card) 54' (yellow-red card) 78'; Lesovoy 60'; Fomin 86' (pen.); Rausch 90+' | Report | Kulikov (yellow card) 35'; Rajković (yellow card) 37' (yellow-red card) 38'; Guilherme (yellow card) 39' (red card) 64'; Zé Luís 45+' (yellow card) 84'; Magkeyev (yellow card) 84' | Stadium: VTB Arena; Attendance: 6,158; Referee: Igor Panin |

| 21 November 2020 15 | Spartak Moscow | 1 – 1 | Dynamo Moscow | Moscow |
| 19:00 MSK (UTC+3) | Ayrton (yellow card) 81'; Maslov (yellow card) 83'; Zobnin 85' | Report | Grulyov (yellow card) 76'; Neustädter (yellow card) 78'; Skopintsev 79' | Stadium: Otkritie Arena; Attendance: 4,953; Referee: Sergey Ivanov |

| 28 November 2020 16 | Rostov | 4 – 1 | Dynamo Moscow | Rostov-on-Don |
| 19:00 MSK (UTC+3) | Poloz 35' (pen.), 72' (pen.), 74'; Hadžikadunić (yellow card) 57'; Bayramyan (yellow card) 85' | Report | Szymański (yellow card) 58'; Pliyev (yellow card) 69'; Moro 90+' (pen.) | Stadium: Rostov Arena; Attendance: 12,128; Referee: Sergey Lapochkin |

| 6 December 2020 17 | Dynamo Moscow | 1 – 0 | Arsenal Tula | Moscow |
| 16:30 MSK (UTC+3) | Fomin 45'; Ordets (yellow card) 72'; Tyukavin (yellow card) 83' | Report | Dovbnya (yellow card) 78' | Stadium: VTB Arena; Attendance: 4,768; Referee: Vasily Kazartsev |

| 12 December 2020 18 | Zenit St.Petersburg | 3 – 1 | Dynamo Moscow | Saint Petersburg |
| 19:00 MSK (UTC+3) | Dzyuba 14', 34' (pen.); Ozdoyev (yellow card) 55'; Azmoun 84'; Chistyakov (yellow card) 90+' | Report | Parshivlyuk (yellow card) 34'; Komlichenko 56' (pen.) (yellow card) 81' | Stadium: Krestovsky Stadium; Attendance: 1,909; Referee: Sergey Ivanov |

| 16 December 2020 19 | Sochi | 2 – 0 | Dynamo Moscow | Sochi |
| 18:00 MSK (UTC+3) | Dugandžić (yellow card) 44'; Zabolotny 52'; Yusupov 70' | Report | Yevgenyev (yellow card) 16' (yellow-red card) 64' | Stadium: Fisht Olympic Stadium; Attendance: 2,685; Referee: Vitali Meshkov |

| 28 February 2021 20 | Akhmat Grozny | 1 – 2 | Dynamo Moscow | Grozny |
| 16:30 MSK (UTC+3) | Shvets (yellow card) 16' (goal) 68'; Timofeyev (yellow card) 23' (yellow-red card) 77'; Ángel (yellow card) 40'; Berisha (yellow card) 42'; Kharin (yellow card) 52'; Melkadze (yellow card) 79' | Report | Fomin 7' (pen.); Szymański (yellow card) 34'; Zakharyan 37'; Shunin (yellow card) 90+4' | Stadium: Akhmat-Arena; Attendance: 25,317; Referee: Vladislav Bezborodov |

| 7 March 2021 21 | Dynamo Moscow | 2 – 0 | Tambov | Moscow |
| 16:30 MSK (UTC+3) | Grulyov 37'; Fomin (yellow card) 55'; Moro 90' (pen.) | Report | Karapuzov (yellow card) 9'; Terekhov (yellow card) 56' | Stadium: VTB Arena; Attendance: 7,502; Referee: Evgeny Kukulyak |

| 13 March 2021 22 | Dynamo Moscow | 1 – 2 | Spartak Moscow | Moscow |
| 19:00 MSK (UTC+3) | Maslov 18' (pen.); Parshivlyuk (yellow card) 41'; Skopintsev (yellow card) 89' | Report | Moses 30'; Ayrton (yellow card) 53'; Promes (yellow card) 61'; Sobolev 63' (pen.) (yellow card) 90+'; Kutepov (yellow card) 80' | Stadium: VTB Arena; Attendance: 12,567; Referee: Sergey Ivanov |

| 18 March 2021 23 | Krasnodar | 2 – 3 | Dynamo Moscow | Krasnodar |
| 19:00 MSK (UTC+3) | Kaio (yellow card) 8' (yellow-red card) 18'; Vilhena 11'; Claesson (yellow card) 33'; Gazinsky 51'; Sorokin (yellow card) 75'; Wanderson (yellow card) 90+' | Report | Grulyov (yellow card) 12'; Varela (yellow card) 27'; Fomin (yellow card) 51' (goal) 58'; Tyukavin 66', 81' | Stadium: Krasnodar Stadium; Attendance: 10,554; Referee: Vasily Kazartsev |

| 3 April 2021 24 | Dynamo Moscow | 4 – 0 | Ufa | Moscow |
| 19:00 MSK (UTC+3) | Lesovoy 10'; Tyukavin 27'; Ordets (yellow card) 41'; Neustädter 52'; Komlichenko 61' (pen.) | Report | Pliyev (yellow card) 43'; Alikin (yellow card) 71'; Mrzljak (yellow card) 85' | Stadium: VTB Arena; Attendance: 10,016; Referee: Ivan Sidenkov |

| 11 April 2021 25 | Dynamo Moscow | 2 – 2 | Ural Yekaterinburg | Moscow |
| 16:30 MSK (UTC+3) | Grulyov (yellow card) 32'; Szymański (yellow card) 44' (yellow-red card) 56'; Ordets 48' (yellow card) 84'; Zakharyan (yellow card) 65' (goal) 71'; Varela (yellow card) 84'; Neustädter (yellow card) 90' | Report | Jovičić (yellow card) 28'; Pogrebnyak 43', 75'; Yegorychev (yellow card) 82'; Augustyniak (yellow card) 87' | Stadium: VTB Arena; Attendance: 10,058; Referee: Igor Panin |

| 17 April 2021 26 | Rotor Volgograd | 0 – 3 | Dynamo Moscow | Volgograd |
| 16:30 MSK (UTC+3) | Stepanov (yellow card) 25'; Kipiani (yellow card) 41'; Kvirkvelia (yellow card) 56' | Report | Yevgenyev (yellow card) 42'; Zakharyan (yellow card) 53'; Fomin 57' (pen.); Parshivlyuk (yellow card) 58'; Ordets 76'; N'Jie (yellow card) 82' (goal) 90+' | Stadium: Volgograd Arena; Attendance: 9,101; Referee: Pavel Kukuyan |

| 24 April 2021 27 | Dynamo Moscow | 0 – 1 | Khimki | Moscow |
| 19:00 MSK (UTC+3) | | Report | Sebai (yellow card) 45+'; Dagerstål (yellow card) 51'; Filin (yellow card) 75'; Glushenkov 90+' | Stadium: VTB Arena; Attendance: 11,327; Referee: Evgeny Kukulyak |

| 1 May 2021 28 | Rubin Kazan | 2 – 0 | Dynamo Moscow | Kazan |
| 14:00 MSK (UTC+3) | Despotović 15'; Hwang (yellow card) 42' (goal) 80'; Samoshnikov (red card) 52'; Makarov (yellow card) 70' | Report | Szymański (yellow card) 9'; Skopintsev (yellow card) 35'; Fomin (yellow card) 89' | Stadium: Ak Bars Arena; Attendance: 9,063; Referee: Vitali Meshkov |

| 8 May 2021 29 | Lokomotiv Moscow | 0 – 0 | Dynamo Moscow | Moscow |
| 16:30 MSK (UTC+3) | Zhemaletdinov (yellow card) 27'; Zhivoglyadov (yellow card) 82' | Report | Tyukavin (yellow card) 15'; Zakharyan (yellow card) 18'; Ordets (yellow card) 31' (yellow-red card) 73' | Stadium: RZD Arena; Attendance: 5,100; Referee: Pavel Kukuyan |

| 16 May 2021 30 | Dynamo Moscow | 3 – 2 | CSKA Moscow | Moscow |
| 14:00 MSK (UTC+3) | Varela (yellow card) 32'; Neustädter (yellow card) 43'; Grulyov 65', 72'; Yevgenyev (yellow card) 68'; Kaboré (yellow card) 85'; Zakharyan 89' | Report | Tiknizyan 18' (yellow card) 33'; Vasin (yellow card) 30'; Ejuke 79'; Shchennikov (yellow card) 90+' | Stadium: VTB Arena; Attendance: 12,533; Referee: Kirill Levnikov |

==== League table ====
| Pos | Team | Pld | W | D | L | GF | GA | GD | Pts | Qualification or relegation |
|---|---|---|---|---|---|---|---|---|---|---|
| 5 | Sochi | 30 | 15 | 8 | 7 | 49 | 33 | +16 | 53 (Note: Head-to-head points: Rubin 3, Sochi 3. Overall matches won: Rubin 16, Sochi 15.) | Qualification for the Europa Conference League second qualifying round |
| 6 | CSKA Moscow | 30 | 15 | 5 | 10 | 51 | 33 | +18 | 50 (Note: Head-to-head points: CSKA 3, Dynamo 3. Head-to-head goal difference: CSKA +1, Dynamo -1.) | |
| 7 | Dynamo Moscow | 30 | 15 | 5 | 10 | 44 | 33 | +11 | 50 | |
| 8 | Khimki | 30 | 13 | 6 | 11 | 35 | 39 | −4 | 45 | |
| 9 | Rostov | 30 | 13 | 4 | 13 | 37 | 35 | +2 | 43 | |

Source: Premier Liga
Rules for classification: 1) Points; 2) Head-to-head points; 3) Head-to-head matches won; 4) Head-to-head goal difference; 5) Head-to-head goals scored; 6) Matches won; 7) Goal difference; 8) Goals scored; 9) Play-off.

=== Russian Cup ===
| 20 February 2021 Round of 16 | Dynamo Moscow | 2 – 0 | Spartak Moscow | Moscow |
| 19:30 MSK (UTC+3) | Fomin 16' (pen.) (yellow card) 74'; Szymański (yellow card) 56'; Tyukavin 70'; Kaboré (yellow card) 90+3' | Report | Moses (yellow card) 15' (yellow-red card) 81'; Larsson (yellow card) 26'; Ponce (yellow card) 69' | Stadium: VTB Arena; Attendance: 11,322; Referee: Kirill Levnikov |

| 8 April 2021 Quarterfinal | Krylia Sovetov | 2 – 0 | Dynamo Moscow | Samara |
| 17:30 MSK (UTC+3) | Yezhov 5' (yellow card) 68'; Chernov (yellow card) 29'; Sarveli (yellow card) 57'; Sergeyev 72'; Lomayev (yellow card) 72'; Zeffane (yellow card) 74' | Report | Neustädter (yellow card) 49'; Szymański (yellow card) 62'; Parshivlyuk (yellow card) 65'; Fomin (yellow card) 86' | Stadium: Samara Arena; Attendance: 12,762; Referee: Artyom Lyubimov |

=== UEFA Europa League ===
==== Qualifying rounds ====
| 17 September 2020 Second Qualifying Round | Locomotive Tbilisi (Georgia (country)) | 2 – 1 | (Russia) Dynamo Moscow | Tbilisi, Georgia |
| 20:00 MSK (UTC+3) | D.Samurkasovi (yellow card) 7'; Sandokhadze (yellow card) 33'; G.Gabadze (yellow card) 40'; Sikharulidze 54' (yellow card) 58'; Gavashelishvili 76' | Report | Skopintsev (yellow card) 21'; Yevgenyev (yellow card) 74'; Komlichenko 90' (pen.) | Stadium: Mikheil Meskhi Stadium; Attendance: 0 Referee: Karim Abed (France) |
Note: Match played behind closed doors due to the COVID-19 pandemic in Georgia and as per UEFA regulations.

== Squad statistics ==
As of match played 16 May 2021

=== Appearances and goals ===
| No. | Pos | Nat | Player | Total | | Premier League | | Russian Cup | | Europa League | |
| No. | Pos | Nat | Player | Apps | Goals | Apps | Goals | Apps | Goals | Apps | Goals |
|---|---|---|---|---|---|---|---|---|---|---|---|
| 1 | GK | (Russia) RUS | Anton Shunin | 30 | 0 | 27 | 0 | 2 | 0 | 1 | 0 |
| 2 | DF | (Uruguay) URU | Guillermo Varela | 19 | 0 | 15+2 | 0 | 2 | 0 | 0 | 0 |
| 3 | DF | (Russia) RUS | Zaurbek Pliyev | 7 | 0 | 1+6 | 0 | 0 | 0 | 0 | 0 |
| 4 | DF | (Russia) RUS | Sergei Parshivlyuk | 25 | 0 | 21+1 | 0 | 2 | 0 | 1 | 0 |
| 5 | DF | (Russia) RUS | Roman Neustädter | 17 | 1 | 10+6 | 1 | 1 | 0 | 0 | 0 |
| 7 | MF | (Russia) RUS | Dmitri Skopintsev | 26 | 1 | 22+2 | 1 | 0+1 | 0 | 1 | 0 |
| 8 | MF | (Croatia) CRO | Nikola Moro | 26 | 3 | 18+6 | 3 | 2 | 0 | 0 | 0 |
| 9 | FW | (Cameroon) CMR | Clinton N'Jie | 25 | 4 | 15+8 | 4 | 0+1 | 0 | 1 | 0 |
| 10 | FW | (Nigeria) NGR | Sylvester Igboun | 20 | 1 | 5+12 | 1 | 0+2 | 0 | 0+1 | 0 |
| 11 | FW | (Russia) RUS | Nikolay Komlichenko | 27 | 5 | 11+14 | 4 | 0+1 | 0 | 1 | 1 |
| 12 | MF | (Russia) RUS | Danil Lipovoy | 3 | 0 | 0+2 | 0 | 1 | 0 | 0 | 0 |
| 17 | MF | (Russia) RUS | Anton Terekhov | 7 | 0 | 2+5 | 0 | 0 | 0 | 0 | 0 |
| 18 | DF | (Ukraine) UKR | Ivan Ordets | 30 | 3 | 27 | 3 | 2 | 0 | 1 | 0 |
| 19 | MF | (Russia) RUS | Daniil Lesovoy | 25 | 5 | 21+1 | 5 | 2 | 0 | 0+1 | 0 |
| 20 | MF | (Russia) RUS | Vyacheslav Grulyov | 27 | 4 | 15+10 | 4 | 2 | 0 | 0 | 0 |
| 22 | MF | (Russia) RUS | Igor Shkolik | 4 | 0 | 0+4 | 0 | 0 | 0 | 0 | 0 |
| 24 | DF | (Russia) RUS | Roman Yevgenyev | 29 | 1 | 27 | 1 | 1 | 0 | 1 | 0 |
| 31 | GK | (Russia) RUS | Igor Leshchuk | 3 | 0 | 3 | 0 | 0 | 0 | 0 | 0 |
| 47 | MF | (Russia) RUS | Arsen Zakharyan | 13 | 3 | 10+3 | 3 | 0 | 0 | 0 | 0 |
| 50 | DF | (Russia) RUS | Aleksandr Kutitsky | 1 | 0 | 0 | 0 | 0+1 | 0 | 0 | 0 |
| 53 | MF | (Poland) POL | Sebastian Szymański | 31 | 1 | 28 | 1 | 2 | 0 | 1 | 0 |
| 65 | MF | (Russia) RUS | Vladimir Moskvichyov | 2 | 0 | 0+2 | 0 | 0 | 0 | 0 | 0 |
| 70 | FW | (Russia) RUS | Konstantin Tyukavin | 17 | 4 | 6+9 | 3 | 1+1 | 1 | 0 | 0 |
| 74 | MF | (Russia) RUS | Daniil Fomin | 31 | 8 | 29 | 6 | 1 | 2 | 1 | 0 |
| 77 | MF | (Burkina Faso) BFA | Charles Kaboré | 21 | 0 | 9+10 | 0 | 0+1 | 0 | 1 | 0 |
| 79 | DF | (Russia) RUS | Sergei Slepov | 4 | 0 | 2+2 | 0 | 0 | 0 | 0 | 0 |
Players away from the club on loan:
| 2 | DF | (Russia) RUS | Grigori Morozov | 4 | 0 | 0+3 | 0 | 0 | 0 | 0+1 | 0 |
| 5 | FW | (Germany) GER | Maximilian Philipp | 8 | 1 | 4+3 | 1 | 0 | 0 | 1 | 0 |
Players who appeared for Dynamo Moscow but left during the season:
| 23 | MF | (Russia) RUS | Vladislav Karapuzov | 5 | 0 | 0+5 | 0 | 0 | 0 | 0 | 0 |
| 34 | DF | (Russia) RUS | Konstantin Rausch | 4 | 1 | 0+4 | 1 | 0 | 0 | 0 | 0 |
| 44 | DF | (Bosnia and Herzegovina) BIH | Toni Šunjić | 2 | 1 | 2 | 1 | 0 | 0 | 0 | 0 |

=== Goal scorers ===
| Place | Position | Nation | Number | Name | Premier League | Russian Cup | Europa League | Total |
|---|---|---|---|---|---|---|---|---|
| 1 | MF | (Russia) | 74 | Daniil Fomin | 6 | 1 | 0 | 7 |
| 2 | MF | (Russia) | 19 | Daniil Lesovoy | 5 | 0 | 0 | 5 |
| 2 | FW | (Russia) | 11 | Nikolay Komlichenko | 4 | 0 | 1 | 5 |
| 2 | FW | (Russia) | 70 | Konstantin Tyukavin | 3 | 1 | 0 | 4 |
| 5 | FW | (Cameroon) | 9 | Clinton N'Jie | 4 | 0 | 0 | 4 |
| 5 | MF | (Russia) | 20 | Vyacheslav Grulyov | 4 | 0 | 0 | 4 |
| 7 | MF | (Croatia) | 8 | Nikola Moro | 3 | 0 | 0 | 3 |
| 7 | DF | (Ukraine) | 18 | Ivan Ordets | 3 | 0 | 0 | 3 |
| 9 | MF | (Russia) | 47 | Arsen Zakharyan | 2 | 0 | 0 | 2 |
| 10 | FW | (Nigeria) | 10 | Sylvester Igboun | 1 | 0 | 0 | 1 |
| 10 | FW | (Germany) | 5 | Maximilian Philipp | 1 | 0 | 0 | 1 |
| 10 | DF | (Bosnia and Herzegovina) | 44 | Toni Šunjić | 1 | 0 | 0 | 1 |
| 10 | MF | (Poland) | 53 | Sebastian Szymański | 1 | 0 | 0 | 1 |
| 10 | DF | (Poland) | 24 | Roman Yevgenyev | 1 | 0 | 0 | 1 |
| 10 | DF | (Russia) | 34 | Konstantin Rausch | 1 | 0 | 0 | 1 |
| 10 | MF | (Russia) | 7 | Dmitri Skopintsev | 1 | 0 | 0 | 1 |
| 10 | DF | (Russia) | 5 | Roman Neustädter | 1 | 0 | 0 | 1 |
| 10 | | | | Own goal | 1 | 0 | 0 | 1 |
| Total | | | | | 44 | 2 | 1 | 47 |

=== Clean sheets ===
| Place | Position | Nation | Number | Name | Premier League | Russian Cup | Europa League | Total |
|---|---|---|---|---|---|---|---|---|
| 1 | GK | (Russia) | 1 | Anton Shunin | 11 | 0 | 0 | 11 |
| 2 | GK | (Russia) | 31 | Igor Leshchuk | 1 | 0 | 0 | 1 |
| Total | | | | | 12 | 0 | 0 | 12 |

=== Disciplinary record ===
| Number | Nation | Position | Name | Premier League | | Russian Cup | | Europa League | | Total | |
| Number | Nation | Position | Name | Booked | Sent off (straight red) | Booked | Sent off (straight red) | Booked | Sent off (straight red) | Booked | Sent off (straight red) |
|---|---|---|---|---|---|---|---|---|---|---|---|
| 1 | (Russia) | GK | Anton Shunin | 2 | 0 | 0 | 0 | 0 | 0 | 2 | 0 |
| 2 | (Uruguay) | DF | Guillermo Varela | 3 | 0 | 0 | 0 | 0 | 0 | 3 | 0 |
| 3 | (Russia) | DF | Zaurbek Pliyev | 3 | 0 | 0 | 0 | 0 | 0 | 3 | 0 |
| 4 | (Russia) | DF | Sergei Parshivlyuk | 11 | 2 | 1 | 0 | 0 | 0 | 12 | 2 |
| 5 | (Russia) | DF | Roman Neustädter | 4 | 0 | 1 | 0 | 0 | 0 | 5 | 0 |
| 7 | (Russia) | MF | Dmitri Skopintsev | 3 | 1 | 0 | 0 | 1 | 0 | 4 | 1 |
| 8 | (Croatia) | MF | Nikola Moro | 2 | 0 | 0 | 0 | 0 | 0 | 2 | 0 |
| 9 | (Cameroon) | FW | Clinton N'Jie | 4 | 0 | 0 | 0 | 0 | 0 | 4 | 0 |
| 10 | (Nigeria) | FW | Sylvester Igboun | 1 | 0 | 0 | 0 | 0 | 0 | 1 | 0 |
| 11 | (Russia) | FW | Nikolay Komlichenko | 5 | 1 | 0 | 0 | 0 | 0 | 5 | 1 |
| 18 | (Ukraine) | DF | Ivan Ordets | 9 | 1 | 0 | 0 | 0 | 0 | 9 | 1 |
| 19 | (Russia) | MF | Daniil Lesovoy | 3 | 0 | 0 | 0 | 0 | 0 | 3 | 0 |
| 20 | (Russia) | MF | Vyacheslav Grulyov | 6 | 0 | 0 | 0 | 0 | 0 | 6 | 0 |
| 24 | (Russia) | DF | Roman Yevgenyev | 9 | 2 | 0 | 0 | 1 | 0 | 10 | 2 |
| 47 | (Russia) | MF | Arsen Zakharyan | 3 | 0 | 0 | 0 | 0 | 0 | 3 | 0 |
| 53 | (Poland) | MF | Sebastian Szymański | 9 | 1 | 2 | 0 | 0 | 0 | 11 | 1 |
| 70 | (Russia) | FW | Konstantin Tyukavin | 2 | 0 | 0 | 0 | 0 | 0 | 2 | 0 |
| 74 | (Russia) | MF | Daniil Fomin | 6 | 0 | 2 | 0 | 0 | 0 | 8 | 0 |
| 77 | (Burkina Faso) | MF | Charles Kaboré | 5 | 0 | 1 | 0 | 0 | 0 | 6 | 0 |
| 79 | (Russia) | DF | Sergei Slepov | 2 | 0 | 0 | 0 | 0 | 0 | 2 | 0 |
Players away on loan:
| 5 | (Germany) | FW | Maximilian Philipp | 2 | 0 | 0 | 0 | 0 | 0 | 2 | 0 |
Players who left Dynamo Moscow during the season:
| Total | | | | 94 | 8 | 7 | 0 | 2 | 0 | 103 | 8 |
