= 2017–18 Olympique de Marseille season =

Olympique de Marseille
2017–18 season
- Chairman: Jacques-Henri Eyraud
- Manager: Rudi Garcia
- Stadium: Stade Vélodrome
- Ligue 1: 4th
- Coupe de France: Quarter-finals
- Coupe de la Ligue: Round of 16
- UEFA Europa League: Runners-up
- Top goalscorer: League: Florian Thauvin (22); All: Florian Thauvin (25)
- Highest home attendance: 62,312 vs Red Bull Salzburg (26 April 2018)
- Lowest home attendance: 8,649 vs Konyaspor (14 September 2017)
Home colours	Away colours	Third colours

The 2017–18 season was Olympique de Marseille's 68th professional season since its creation in 1899 and 22nd consecutive season in the top flight. The club participated in Ligue 1, Coupe de France, Coupe de la Ligue and the UEFA Europa League.

== Squad ==
Note: Flags indicate national team as defined under FIFA eligibility rules; some limited exceptions apply. Players may hold more than one non-FIFA nationality.

No.	Pos.	Nation	Player
1	GK	FRA	Romain Cagnon
2	DF	JPN	Hiroki Sakai
3	DF	BRA	Dória
4	DF	FRA	Boubacar Kamara
5	FW	ARG	Lucas Ocampos
6	DF	POR	Rolando
7	MF	FRA	Rémy Cabella
8	MF	FRA	Morgan Sanson
10	MF	FRA	Dimitri Payet (captain)
11	FW	GRE	Kostas Mitroglou
12	DF	CMR	Henri Bedimo
13	DF	TUN	Aymen Abdennour (on loan from Valencia)
14	FW	CMR	Clinton N'Jie
15	DF	SVK	Tomáš Hubočan
16	GK	FRA	Yohann Pelé
17	MF	SEN	Bouna Sarr

No.	Pos.	Nation	Player
18	DF	FRA	Jordan Amavi (on loan from Aston Villa)
19	MF	BRA	Luiz Gustavo
20	MF	TUN	Saîf-Eddine Khaoui
21	DF	FRA	Patrice Evra
22	MF	FRA	Grégory Sertic
23	DF	FRA	Adil Rami
24	DF	FRA	Rod Fanni
25	MF	NZL	Bill Tuiloma
26	FW	FRA	Florian Thauvin
27	MF	FRA	Maxime Lopez
28	FW	FRA	Valère Germain
29	MF	CMR	André-Frank Zambo Anguissa
30	GK	FRA	Steve Mandanda
33	FW	TUR	Yusuf Sari
40	GK	FRA	Florian Escales

=== Reserves ===
Note: Flags indicate national team as defined under FIFA eligibility rules; some limited exceptions apply. Players may hold more than one non-FIFA nationality.

No.	Pos.	Nation	Player
—	GK	FRA	Christian Madede
—	GK	FRA	Suan Besic
—	GK	FRA	Amadou Dia
—	DF	FRA	Lucas Perrin
—	DF	FRA	Jérémy Mizrahi
—	DF	FRA	Christopher Rocchia
—	DF	CMR	Brice Nlaté
—	DF	FRA	Malik Ousfane
—	DF	COM	Abdallah Ali Mohamed
—	MF	FRA	Brahima Doukansy
—	MF	FRA	Kevan Mezine

No.	Pos.	Nation	Player
—	MF	CMR	Chryst Gnapele
—	MF	FRA	Raouf Mroivili
—	MF	FRA	Sacha Marasović
—	MF	FRA	Housseine Zakouani
—	MF	FRA	Florian Chabrolle
—	FW	FRA	Yusuf Sari
—	FW	FRA	Dylan Bolnet
—	FW	FRA	Yoann Araujo
—	FW	FRA	Killian Taghri
—	FW	ALB	Gent Dinaj

== Transfers ==
=== Summer ===
In:

No.	Pos.	Nation	Player
5	MF	ARG	Lucas Ocampos (loan return from (Italy) Milan)
11	FW	GRE	Kostas Mitroglou (from (Portugal) Benfica)
13	DF	TUN	Aymen Abdennour (on loan from (Spain) Valencia)
19	MF	BRA	Luiz Gustavo (from (Germany) VfL Wolfsburg)
23	DF	FRA	Adil Rami (from (Spain) Sevilla)
18	DF	FRA	Jordan Amavi (on loan from (England) Aston Villa)
26	MF	FRA	Florian Thauvin (from (England) Newcastle United, previously on loan)
28	FW	FRA	Valère Germain (from (France) Monaco)
30	GK	FRA	Steve Mandanda (from (England) Crystal Palace)

Out:

No.	Pos.	Nation	Player
4	DF	NED	Karim Rekik (to (Germany) Hertha BSC)
5	MF	FRA	Abou Diaby (released)
7	MF	FRA	Rémy Cabella (on loan to (France) Saint-Étienne)
16	GK	CGO	Brice Samba (to (France) Caen)
18	FW	FRA	Bafétimbi Gomis (loan return to (Wales) Swansea City)
19	MF	FRA	William Vainqueur (loan return to (Italy) Roma)
20	MF	TUN	Saîf-Eddine Khaoui (on loan to (France) Troyes)
22	FW	BEL	Aaron Leya Iseka (loan return to (Belgium) Anderlecht)
23	MF	FRA	Zinedine Machach (loan return to (France) Toulouse)
25	MF	NZL	Bill Tuiloma (to (United States) Portland Timbers)
28	FW	FRA	Antoine Rabillard (to (France) Béziers)
29	FW	FRA	Jérémie Porsan-Clemente (to (France) Montpellier)
—	GK	FRA	Julien Fabri (to (France) Brest, previously on loan at (France) Bourg-Péronnas)
—	DF	FRA	Baptiste Aloé (to (France) Valenciennes, previously on loan)
—	DF	FRA	Stéphane Sparagna (to (Portugal) Boavista, previously on loan at (France) Auxerre)

== Friendlies ==
1 July 2017 Friendly	Valais Selection	0–2	Marseille	Saillon, Switzerland
19:00 CEST (UTC+02:00)			Dória 38'; Tamayo 47' (o.g.)	Stadium: Stade Saint-Laurent

5 July 2017 Friendly	Sion	2–3	Marseille	Saillon, Switzerland
18:00 CEST (UTC+02:00)	Schneuwly 47'; Karlen 62'		Ocampos 9'; Germain 10'; Sarr 52'	Stadium: Stade Saint-Laurent

9 July 2017 Friendly	Marseille	2–0	Étoile du Sahel	Martigues, France
21:00 CEST (UTC+02:00)	Rolando 6'; Germain 62'			Stadium: Stade Francis-Turcan

12 July 2017 Friendly	Marseille	4–2	Viitorul Constanța	Lausanne, Switzerland
19:00 CEST (UTC+02:00)	Țîru 24' (o.g.); N'Jie 63', 66'; Khaoui 84'		Chițu 51'; Benzar 76' (pen.)	Stadium: Olympique Stadium of la Pontaise

15 July 2017 Friendly	Marseille	1–0	Fenerbahçe	Lausanne, Switzerland
21:00 CEST (UTC+02:00)	Germain 77'			Stadium: Olympique Stadium of la Pontaise

18 July 2017 Friendly	Marseille	2–1	Sporting CP	Annecy, France
19:00 CEST (UTC+02:00)	N'Jie 2', 52'		Doumbia 71' (pen.)	Stadium: Parc des Sports

22 July 2017 Friendly	Rangers	1–1	Marseille	Glasgow, Scotland
15:00 BST (UTC+01:00)	Kranjčar 75'		Germain 63'	Stadium: Ibrox Stadium

== Competitions ==
=== Ligue 1 ===
==== League table ====
Pos	Team	Pld	W	D	L	GF	GA	GD	Pts	Qualification or relegation
2	Monaco	38	24	8	6	85	45	+40	80	Qualification for the Champions League group stage
3	Lyon	38	23	9	6	87	43	+44	78	Qualification for the Champions League group stage
4	Marseille	38	22	11	5	80	47	+33	77	Qualification for the Europa League group stage (Note: Since the winners of the 2017–18 Coupe de France and the 2017–18 Coupe de la Ligue, Paris Saint-Germain, qualified for European competition based on league position, the spot awarded to the Coupe de France winners (Europa League group stage) was passed to the fourth-placed team and the spot awarded to the Coupe de la Ligue winners (Europa League third qualifying round) was passed to the sixth-placed team. The fifth-placed team received the spot in Europa League third qualifying round originally designated to the fourth-placed team.)
5	Rennes	38	16	10	12	50	44	+6	58	Qualification for the Europa League group stage
6	Bordeaux	38	16	7	15	53	48	+5	55	Qualification for the Europa League second qualifying round

Source: Ligue 1 and Soccerway
Rules for classification: 1) Points; 2) Goal difference; 3) Head-to-head points; 4) Head-to-head goal difference; 5) Head-to-head goals scored; 6) Head-to-head away goals; 7) Goals scored; 8) Away goals scored; 9) Most goals scored in one league match; 10) Fair-play points

==== Results summary ====
Overall								Home						Away					
Pld	W	D	L	GF	GA	GD	Pts	W	D	L	GF	GA	GD	W	D	L	GF	GA	GD
38	22	11	5	80	47	+33	77	12	5	2	44	19	+25	10	6	3	36	28	+8

Last updated: 19 May 2018.
Source: Results

==== Results by round ====
Round	1	2	3	4	5	6	7	8	9	10	11	12	13	14	15	16	17	18	19	20	21	22	23	24	25	26	27	28	29	30	31	32	33	34	35	36	37	38
Ground	H	A	H	A	H	A	H	A	A	H	A	H	A	H	A	A	H	A	H	A	H	A	H	H	A	H	A	H	A	H	A	H	A	H	A	H	A	H
Result	W	W	D	L	L	W	W	W	D	D	W	W	D	W	W	D	W	L	W	W	W	W	D	W	D	W	L	D	W	L	W	D	W	W	D	W	D	W
Position	2	4	5	6	10	6	5	3	4	5	4	4	4	4	2	4	4	4	4	4	3	3	3	2	3	3	3	3	3	3	3	4	4	4	4	4	4	4

Source: Results
A = Away; H = Home; W = Win; D = Draw; L = Loss

==== Results ====
6 August 2017 1	Marseille	3–0	Dijon	Marseille
20:45 CEST (UTC+02:00)	Luiz Gustavo (yellow card) 4'; N'Jie 51', 72'; Thauvin 54'	Report		Stadium: Stade Vélodrome; Attendance: 48,922; Referee: Benoît Bastien

12 August 2017 2	Nantes	0–1	Marseille	Nantes
17:00 CEST (UTC+02:00)	Lima (yellow card) 15'	Report	Thauvin (yellow card) 14'; Ocampos 87'; Rolando (yellow card) 90+3'; Luiz Gustavo (yellow card) 90+4'	Stadium: Stade de la Beaujoire; Attendance: 33,654; Referee: Frank Schneider

20 August 2017 3	Marseille	1–1	Angers	Marseille
17:00 CEST (UTC+02:00)	Thauvin (yellow card) 14'; N'Jie 17'; Amavi (yellow card) 62'; Germain (yellow card) 90+2'; Ocampos (red card) 90+4'	Report	Santamaria (yellow card) 27'; Pavlović (yellow card) 68'; Toko Ekambi 70'	Stadium: Stade Vélodrome; Attendance: 51,966; Referee: Jérôme Miguelgorry

27 August 2017 4	Monaco	6–1	Marseille	Monaco
20:00 CEST (UTC+02:00)	Glik 2', (yellow card) 28'; Falcao 20' (pen.), 34'; Diakhaby 45'; Fabinho (yellow card) 56', (goal) 79' (pen.); Sidibé 68'	Report	Sanson (yellow card) 4'; Luiz Gustavo (yellow card) 34'; Hubočan (yellow card) 43'; Cabella 75'	Stadium: Stade Louis II; Attendance: 16,353; Referee: Ruddy Buquet

10 September 2017 5	Marseille	1–3	Rennes	Marseille
21:00 CEST (UTC+02:00)	Sanson (yellow card) 4', (goal) 87'; Evra (yellow card) 27'; Rami (yellow card) 29'; Abdennour (yellow card) 61'; Sertic (yellow card) 88'; Rolando (yellow card) 90'	Report	Khazri 2'; Bourigeaud 10'; Gnagnon 70'; André (yellow card) 75'	Stadium: Stade Vélodrome; Attendance: 40,343; Referee: Antony Gautier

17 September 2017 6	Amiens	0–2	Marseille	Amiens
15:00 CEST (UTC+02:00)	El Hajjam (yellow card) 4'; Gouano (yellow card) 14'	Report	Luiz Gustavo (yellow card) 34'; N'Jie (yellow card) 40', (goal) 53', 55'; Zambo Anguissa (yellow card) 81'	Stadium: Stade de la Licorne; Attendance: 11,698; Referee: Mikael Lesage

24 September 2017 7	Marseille	2–0	Toulouse	Marseille
21:00 CEST (UTC+02:00)	Luiz Gustavo (yellow card) 24'; Thauvin 33'; Ocampos 61'; Zambo Anguissa (yellow card) 85'	Report		Stadium: Stade Vélodrome; Attendance: 39,501; Referee: Benoît Millot

1 October 2017 8	Nice	2–4	Marseille	Nice
21:00 CEST (UTC+02:00)	Balotelli 4'; Seri 16'; Lees-Melou (yellow card) 32'; Pléa (yellow card) 85'	Report	Ocampos 26', 44', (yellow card) 88'; Payet (yellow card) 36'; Lees-Melou 40' (o.g.); Luiz Gustavo 48', (red card) 66'; Amavi (yellow card) 61'	Stadium: Allianz Riviera; Attendance: 32,702; Referee: Benoît Bastien

15 October 2017 9	Strasbourg	3–3	Marseille	Strasbourg
21:00 CEST (UTC+02:00)	Liénard (yellow card) 30', (goal) 75'; Aholou 31', (yellow card) 67'; Koné 61'; Kamara (yellow card) 89'	Report	Payet 5'; Sanson 48', (yellow card) 89'; Amavi (yellow card) 62'; Thauvin (yellow card) 67'; Mitroglou 88'	Stadium: Stade de la Meinau; Attendance: 26,015; Referee: Antony Gautier

22 October 2017 10	Marseille	2–2	Paris Saint-Germain	Marseille
21:00 CEST (UTC+02:00)	Luiz Gustavo 15'; Mitroglou (yellow card) 44'; Sakai (yellow card) 51'; Thauvin 77'; Ocampos (yellow card) 86'; Sanson (yellow card) 90'	Report	Neymar 32', (yellow card) 84' (yellow-red card) 86'; Mbappé (yellow card) 53'; Cavani 90+2'	Stadium: Stade Vélodrome; Attendance: 60,410; Referee: Ruddy Buquet

29 October 2017 11	Lille	0–1	Marseille	Villeneuve-d'Ascq
21:00 CST (UTC+01:00)	Ié (yellow card) 70'; Mendes (yellow card) 84'	Report	Sanson 5'; Evra (yellow card) 10'; Luiz Gustavo (yellow card) 45'; Rami (yellow card) 51'	Stadium: Stade Pierre-Mauroy; Attendance: 43,948; Referee: François Letexier

5 November 2017 12	Marseille	5–0	Caen	Marseille
21:00 CST (UTC+01:00)	Luiz Gustavo 43'; Thauvin 47', 81'; Sanson 52'; Mitroglou 76'	Report		Stadium: Stade Vélodrome; Attendance: 47,687; Referee: Nicolas Rainville

19 November 2017 13	Bordeaux	1–1	Marseille	Bordeaux
21:00 CST (UTC+01:00)	De Préville 3', (yellow card) 22'; Lewczuk (yellow card) 65'; Kamano (yellow card) 67'; Lerager (yellow card) 73'	Report	Thauvin (yellow card) 45'; Lopez (yellow card) 54'; Sanson 90+4'	Stadium: Matmut Atlantique; Attendance: 37,356; Referee: Benoît Millot

26 November 2017 14	Marseille	1–0	Guingamp	Marseille
17:00 CST (UTC+01:00)	Thauvin 13'; Payet (yellow card) 71'; Abdennour (yellow card) 75'	Report	Tabanou (yellow card) 30'; Eboa Eboa (yellow card) 82'	Stadium: Stade Vélodrome; Attendance: 43,563; Referee: Amaury Delerue

29 November 2017 15	Metz	0–3	Marseille	Metz
19:00 CST (UTC+01:00)	Basin (yellow card) 15'	Report	Thauvin 13'; Luiz Gustavo 36'; Ocampos 71'	Stadium: Stade Saint-Symphorien; Attendance: 18,046; Referee: Tony Chapron

3 December 2017 16	Montpellier	1–1	Marseille	Montpellier
21:00 CST (UTC+01:00)	Lasne (yellow card) 2'; Sio 29'; Mukiele (yellow card) 32'; Sessègnon (yellow card) 42'; Mendes (yellow card) 45'	Report	Payet (yellow card) 20'; Thauvin 45' (pen.); Amavi (yellow card) 52'	Stadium: Stade de la Mosson; Attendance: 19,230; Referee: Frank Schneider

10 December 2017 17	Marseille	3–0	Saint-Étienne	Marseille
21:00 CST (UTC+01:00)	Germain 11', 71'; Abdennour (yellow card) 21'; Ocampos 80'	Report	Dabo (yellow card) 30'; Pierre-Gabriel (red card) 51'; Lacroix (yellow card) 60'	Stadium: Stade Vélodrome; Attendance: 41,963; Referee: Nicolas Rainville

17 December 2017 18	Lyon	2–0	Marseille	Décines-Charpieu
21:00 CST (UTC+01:00)	Fekir 6'; Mariano 51'	Report	Rolando (yellow card) 26'; Lopez (yellow card) 66'	Stadium: Parc Olympique Lyonnais; Attendance: 57,206; Referee: Benoît Bastien

20 December 2017 19	Marseille	3–1	Troyes	Marseille
20:50 CST (UTC+01:00)	Payet 31'; Thauvin (yellow card) 54'; Luiz Gustavo 66'; Germain 84'	Report	Pelé 14'	Stadium: Stade Vélodrome; Attendance: 37,494; Referee: Olivier Thual

13 January 2018 20	Rennes	0–3	Marseille	Rennes
17:00 CET (UTC+01:00)	André (yellow card) 36'	Report	Germain 35'; Sanson 45', (yellow card) 65'; Luiz Gustavo (yellow card) 63'; Thauvin 82'	Stadium: Roazhon Park; Attendance: 23,700; Referee: Clément Turpin

16 January 2018 21	Marseille	2–0	Strasbourg	Marseille
19:00 CET (UTC+01:00)	Rami (yellow card) 38'; Zambo Anguissa (yellow card) 77'; N'Jie 79'; Payet 87'	Report	Gonçalves (yellow card) 30'; Aholou (yellow card) 61'; Martin (yellow card) 83'	Stadium: Stade Vélodrome; Attendance: 38,099; Referee: Ruddy Buquet

19 January 2018 22	Caen	0–2	Marseille	Caen
20:45 CET (UTC+01:00)	Guilbert (yellow card) 38'; Da Silva (yellow card) 58'	Report	Sarr (yellow card) 29'; Rolando (yellow card) 42'; Thauvin (yellow card) 53' (goal) 74'; Payet 55' (pen.)	Stadium: Stade Michel d'Ornano; Attendance: 20,249; Referee: François Letexier

26 January 2018 23	Marseille	2–2	Monaco	Marseille
21:00 CET (UTC+01:00)	Rami 7'; Payet (yellow card) 36'; Germain 47'; Sanson (yellow card) 70'; Sarr (yellow card) 85'	Report	Keita 4'; Glik (yellow card) 33'; Ghezzal (yellow card) 45+2'; Fabinho 51'	Stadium: Stade Vélodrome; Attendance: 51,279; Referee: Antony Gautier

2 February 2018 24	Marseille	6–3	Metz	Marseille
20:45 CET (UTC+01:00)	Sanson 6'; Thauvin 9', 44', 56'; Sarr (yellow card) 43'; Germain 49'; Mitroglou 75'	Report	Mollet 73', 84'; Diagne 90'	Stadium: Stade Vélodrome; Attendance: 32,745; Referee: Olivier Thual

9 February 2018 25	Saint-Étienne	2–2	Marseille	Saint-Étienne
20:45 CET (UTC+01:00)	Monnet-Paquet 9'; Berić 75'	Report	Thauvin 4'; Sanson 20'	Stadium: Stade Geoffroy-Guichard; Attendance: 30,162; Referee: Frank Schneider

18 February 2018 26	Marseille	1–0	Bordeaux	Marseille
21:00 CET (UTC+01:00)	Thauvin 35'; Zambo Anguissa (yellow card) 60'; Ocampos (yellow card) 80'	Report	Lerager (yellow card) 42'; Braithwaite (yellow card) 86'	Stadium: Stade Vélodrome; Attendance: 47,287; Referee: Mikael Lesage

25 February 2018 27	Paris Saint-Germain	3–0	Marseille	Paris
21:00 CET (UTC+01:00)	Mbappé 10'; Rolando 28' (o.g.); Thiago Silva (yellow card) 34'; Cavani (yellow card) 45', (goal) 55'; Diarra (yellow card) 58'; Dani Alves (yellow card) 75'; Motta (yellow card) 80'; Di María (yellow card) 89'	Report	Ocampos (yellow card) 20'; Rolando (yellow card) 33'; Germain (yellow card) 49'; Amavi (yellow card) 60'; N'Jie (yellow card) 75'	Stadium: Parc des Princes; Attendance: 47,490; Referee: Benoît Bastien

4 March 2018 28	Marseille	1–1	Nantes	Marseille
21:00 CET (UTC+01:00)	Luiz Gustavo (yellow card) 4'; Rami (yellow card) 55'; Amavi (yellow card) 69'; Thauvin 90+5'	Report	Dubois 11', (yellow card) 35'; Pallois (yellow card) 39' (yellow-red card) 90+5'; Girotto (yellow card) 87'	Stadium: Stade Vélodrome; Attendance: 35,232; Referee: Antony Gautier

11 March 2018 29	Toulouse	1–2	Marseille	Toulouse
21:00 CET (UTC+01:00)	Mubele 19'; Sylla (yellow card) 50'; Gradel (yellow card) 79'; Yago (yellow card) 86'; Lafont (yellow card) 90+5'	Report	Ocampos 10'; Zambo Anguissa (yellow card) 43'; Amavi (yellow card) 63'; Mitroglou 78'; Payet (yellow card) 90+4'	Stadium: Stadium; Attendance: 26,320; Referee: François Letexier

18 March 2018 30	Marseille	2–3	Lyon	Marseille
21:00 CET (UTC+01:00)	Thauvin (yellow card) 18'; Rolando 31'; Mitroglou 84', (yellow card) 89'	Report	Rafael (yellow card) 21'; Rami 42' (o.g.); Mariano (yellow card) 48'; Aouar 52'; Depay 90', (yellow card) 90'	Stadium: Stade Vélodrome; Attendance: 60,009; Referee: Ruddy Buquet

31 March 2018 31	Dijon	1–3	Marseille	Dijon
17:00 CEST (UTC+02:00)	Sammaritano (yellow card) 10'; Kwon Chang-hoon 73'; Yambéré (red card) 90+2'; Reynet (yellow card) 90+3'	Report	Germain 36'; Ocampos (yellow card) 62', (goal) 88'; Sanson (yellow card) 68'; Sarr (yellow card) 84'; Payet 90+5' (pen.)	Stadium: Stade Gaston Gérard; Attendance: 15,157; Referee: Jérôme Brisard

8 April 2018 32	Marseille	0–0	Montpellier	Marseille
21:00 CEST (UTC+02:00)	Ocampos (yellow card) 76'; Luiz Gustavo (yellow card) 77'	Report	Lasne (yellow card) 51'	Stadium: Stade Vélodrome; Attendance: 39,163; Referee: Mikael Lesage

15 April 2018 33	Troyes	2–3	Marseille	Troyes
17:00 CEST (UTC+02:00)	Grandsir 1'; Giraudon (yellow card) 27'; Nivet 48'; Zelazny (yellow card) 75'	Report	N'Jie 11'; Rami (yellow card) 45+2'; Payet (yellow card) 60'; Thauvin (yellow card) 66', (goal) 86'; Mitroglou 75'	Stadium: Stade de l'Aube; Attendance: 18,011; Referee: Sébastien Moreira

21 April 2018 34	Marseille	5–1	Lille	Marseille
17:00 CEST (UTC+02:00)	Thauvin 12', 30' (pen.); Mitroglou 35', 38'; Ocampos 68'	Report	Mendyl (yellow card) 29'; Benzia 54'	Stadium: Stade Vélodrome; Attendance: 51,098; Referee: Amaury Delerue

29 April 2018 35	Angers	1–1	Marseille	Angers
17:00 CEST (UTC+02:00)	Toko Ekambi (yellow card) 61'; Traoré 79'	Report	Thauvin 3' (pen.); Sarr (yellow card) 27'; Péle (yellow card) 74'; Luiz Gustavo (yellow card) 90+1'	Stadium: Stade Raymond Kopa; Attendance: 15,794; Referee: Nicolas Rainville

6 May 2018 36	Marseille	2–1	Nice	Marseille
21:05 CEST (UTC+02:00)	Germain 13'; Kamara (yellow card) 39'; Payet 72'	Report	Balotelli 5', (yellow card) 40'	Stadium: Stade Vélodrome; Attendance: 55,305; Referee: Antony Gautier

11 May 2018 37	Guingamp	3–3	Marseille	Guingamp
20:45 CEST (UTC+02:00)	Grenier (yellow card) 21', (goal) 42', 52' (pen.); Sorbon (yellow card) 55'; Briand 70' (pen.)	Report	Germain 2'; Thauvin 14', 81'; Mandanda (red card) 66'	Stadium: Stade de Roudourou; Attendance: 18,378; Referee: Amaury Delerue

19 May 2018 38	Marseille	2–1	Amiens	Marseille
21:00 CEST (UTC+02:00)	Sanson 10'; Mitroglou 18'	Report	Konaté 30'; Monconduit (red card) 55'	Stadium: Stade Vélodrome; Attendance: 56,120; Referee: Jérôme Brisard

=== Coupe de France ===
6 January 2018 Round of 64	Marseille	1–0 (a.e.t.)	Valenciennes (L2)	Marseille
14:15 CET (UTC+01:00)	Lopez (yellow card) 54'; Rolando (yellow card) 72'; Amavi 103'	Report	Karaboué (yellow card) 75'	Stadium: Stade Vélodrome; Attendance: 25,128; Referee: Mikael Lesage

23 January 2018 Round of 32	SAS Épinal (N2)	0–2	Marseille	Épinal
21:00 CET (UTC+01:00)	Bai (yellow card) 10'	Report	Abdennour (yellow card) 44'; Germain 73'; Sanson 90+3'	Stadium: Stade de la Colombière; Attendance: 6,912; Referee: Johan Hamel

6 February 2018 Round of 16	Bourg-en-Bresse (L2)	0–9	Marseille	Bourg-en-Bresse
18:30 CET (UTC+01:00)	Sarr (yellow card) 73'	Report	Abdennour (yellow card) 5'; Luiz Gustavo 10'; Payet 13'; Ocampos 16', 48', 71'; Mitroglou 20', 40', 81'; N'Jie 89' (pen.)	Stadium: Stade Marcel-Verchère; Attendance: 7,000; Referee: François Letexier

28 February 2018 Quarter-final	Paris Saint-Germain (L1)	3–0	Marseille	Paris
21:05 CET (UTC+01:00)	Di María 45+1', 48'; Meunier (yellow card) 46'; Cavani 81'	Report	N'Jie (yellow card) 32'	Stadium: Parc des Princes; Attendance: 45,000; Referee: Clément Turpin

=== Coupe de la Ligue ===
13 December 2017 Round of 16	Rennes (L1)	2–2 (4–3 p)	Marseille	Rennes
18:45 CET (UTC+01:00)	André 23'; Traoré (yellow card) 44'; Khazri 57'	Report	Mitroglou 13'; Amavi (yellow card) 42'; Germain 80'; Rolando (yellow card) 83'; Ocampos (yellow card) 85'	Stadium: Roazhon Park; Attendance: 22,906; Referee: Johan Hamel
	Penalties
	Khazri (penalty scored); André (penalty scored); Gnagnon (penalty scored); Gelin (penalty missed); Bourigeaud (penalty scored)		(penalty scored) Germain; (penalty scored) Mitroglou; (penalty missed) Ocampos; (penalty missed) Sarr; (penalty scored) Sanson

=== UEFA Europa League ===
==== Third qualifying round ====
27 July 2017 First leg	Marseille (France)	4–2	(Belgium) Oostende	Marseille, France
20:45 CEST (UTC+02:00)	Germain 2', 57', 82'; Evra (yellow card) 15'; Thauvin (yellow card) 25'; Sanson 32'	Report	Siani 26' (pen.), (yellow card) 60'; Musona 69'; Banda (yellow card) 90+2'	Stadium: Stade Vélodrome; Attendance: 46,519; Referee: Mete Kalkavan (Turkey)

3 August 2017 Second leg	Oostende (Belgium)	0–0 (2–4 agg.)	(France) Marseille	Ostend, Belgium
20:45 CEST (UTC+02:00)	Siani (yellow card) 68'	Report	Luiz Gustavo (yellow card) 4'; Sertic (yellow card) 90+3'	Stadium: Versluys Arena; Attendance: 7,500; Referee: Marco Guida (Italy)

==== Play-off round ====
17 August 2017 First leg	Domžale (Slovenia)	1–1	(France) Marseille	Ljubljana, Slovenia
20:45 CEST (UTC+02:00)	Vetrih 12'; Balkovec (yellow card) 77'	Report	Sanson 63'; Cabella (yellow card) 90+1'; Evra (yellow card) 90+3'	Stadium: Stožice Stadium; Attendance: 10,243; Referee: Bobby Madden (Scotland)

24 August 2017 Second leg	Marseille (France)	3–0 (4–1 agg.)	(Slovenia) Domžale	Marseille, France
20:45 CEST (UTC+02:00)	Rami (yellow card) 25'; Germain 28', 56'; Lopez (yellow card) 30'; Thauvin (yellow card) 67', (goal) 85'	Report	Balkovec (yellow card) 37'; Vetrih (yellow card) 57'; Žužek (yellow card) 80'	Stadium: Stade Vélodrome; Attendance: 47,352; Referee: Orel Grinfeeld (Israel)

==== Group stage ====
Pos	Team	Pld	W	D	L	GF	GA	GD	Pts	Qualification	SAL	MAR	KON	VSC
1	(Austria) Red Bull Salzburg	6	3	3	0	7	1	+6	12	Advance to knockout phase	—	1–0	0–0	3–0
2	(France) Marseille	6	2	2	2	4	4	0	8	Advance to knockout phase	0–0	—	1–0	2–1
3	(Turkey) Konyaspor	6	1	3	2	4	6	−2	6		0–2	1–1	—	2–1
4	(Portugal) Vitória de Guimarães	6	1	2	3	5	9	−4	5		1–1	1–0	1–1	—

Source: UEFA
Rules for classification: Group stage tiebreakers

14 September 2017 1	Marseille (France)	1–0	(Turkey) Konyaspor	Marseille, France
21:05 CEST (UTC+02:00)	Luiz Gustavo (yellow card) 4'; Rami 48'	Report	Turan (yellow card) 5'; Öztorun (yellow card) 35'; Araz (yellow card) 42'; Moke (yellow card) 51'	Stadium: Stade Vélodrome; Attendance: 8,649; Referee: Gediminas Mažeika (Lithuanian)

28 September 2017 2	Red Bull Salzburg (Austria)	1–0	(France) Marseille	Wals-Siezenheim, Austria
19:00 CEST (UTC+02:00)	Dabour 73'; Ćaleta-Car (yellow card) 84'	Report	Zambo Anguissa (yellow card) 78'; Kamara (yellow card) 89'	Stadium: Red Bull Arena; Attendance: 11,832; Referee: Ivan Bebek (Croatia)

19 October 2017 3	Marseille (France)	2–1	(Portugal) Vitória de Guimarães	Marseille, France
19:00 CEST (UTC+02:00)	Ocampos 28', (yellow card) 82'; Abdennour (yellow card) 63'; Lopez 76'	Report	Martins 17'; Jubal (yellow card) 59'; Miranda (yellow card) 62'; Raphinha (yellow card) 90+4'	Stadium: Stade Vélodrome; Attendance: 13,359; Referee: Stefan Johannesson (Sweden)

2 November 2017 4	Vitória de Guimarães (Portugal)	1–0	(France) Marseille	Guimarães, Portugal
20:05 WET (UTC+00:00)	Hurtado (yellow card) 15', (goal) 80'; Ferreira (yellow card) 90+1'; Ramos (yellow card) 90+2'	Report	Evra (red card); Amavi (yellow card) 8'; Kamara (yellow card) 56' (yellow-red card) 86'	Stadium: Estádio D. Afonso Henriques; Attendance: 14,181; Referee: Tamás Bognár (Hungary)

23 November 2017 5	Konyaspor (Turkey)	1–1	(France) Marseille	Konya, Turkey
21:00 FET (UTC+03:00)	Skubic (yellow card) 35', (goal) 82' (pen.); Fındıklı (yellow card) 49'; Moke (yellow card) 72'	Report	Thauvin (yellow card) 62'; Amavi (red card) 80'; Moke 90+3' (o.g.)	Stadium: Büyükşehir Stadium; Attendance: 18,000; Referee: Sergei Karasev (Russia)

7 December 2017 6	Marseille (France)	0–0	(Austria) Red Bull Salzburg	Marseille, France
21:05 CET (UTC+01:00)	Ocampos (yellow card) 28'	Report	Ćaleta-Car (yellow card) 57'; Hwang Hee-chan (yellow card) 81'	Stadium: Stade Vélodrome; Attendance: 20,000; Referee: Aleksei Kulbakov (Belarus)

==== Knockout phase ====
===== Round of 32 =====
15 February 2018 First leg	Marseille (France)	3–0	(Portugal) Braga	Marseille, France
19:00 CET (UTC+01:00)	Germain 4', 69'; Amavi (yellow card) 13'; Thauvin 74'	Report	Vukčević (yellow card) 74'	Stadium: Stade Vélodrome; Attendance: 21,731; Referee: Serdar Gözübüyük (Netherlands)

22 February 2018 Second leg	Braga (Portugal)	1–0 (1–3 agg.)	(France) Marseille	Braga, Portugal
20:05 WET (UTC+00:00)	Kouka (yellow card) 18'; R. Horta 31'; Paulinho (yellow card) 65'; Esgaio (yellow card) 74'	Report	Lopez (yellow card) 33'	Stadium: Estádio Municipal; Attendance: 9,016; Referee: Svein Oddvar Moen (Norway)

===== Round of 16 =====
8 March 2018 First leg	Marseille (France)	3–1	(Spain) Athletic Bilbao	Marseille, France
21:05 CET (UTC+01:00)	Ocampos 1', 58'; Payet 14', (yellow card) 45+4'; Germain (yellow card) 38'; Rami (yellow card) 45+2'	Report	Aduriz 45+3' (pen.); San José (yellow card) 56'; Susaeta (yellow card) 60'; Beñat (yellow card) 82'	Stadium: Stade Vélodrome; Attendance: 37,657; Referee: Jorge Sousa (Portugal)

15 March 2018 Second leg	Athletic Bilbao (Spain)	1–2 (2–5 agg.)	(France) Marseille	Bilbao, Spain
19:00 CET (UTC+01:00)	Aduriz (yellow card) 15' (yellow-red card) 76'; Williams (yellow card) 56', (goal) 74'	Report	Payet 38' (pen.); Rami (yellow card) 47'; Ocampos 52'	Stadium: San Mamés; Attendance: 40,580; Referee: Anthony Taylor (England)

===== Quarter-finals =====
5 April 2018 First leg	RB Leipzig (Germany)	1–0	(France) Marseille	Leipzig, Germany
21:05 CEST (UTC+02:00)	Laimer (yellow card) 15'; Werner 45+1'	Report	Kamara (yellow card) 20'; Sarr (yellow card) 67'	Stadium: Red Bull Arena; Attendance: 34,043; Referee: Alberto Undiano Mallenco (Spain)

12 April 2018 Second leg	Marseille (France)	5–2 (5–3 agg.)	(Germany) RB Leipzig	Marseille, France
21:05 CEST (UTC+02:00)	Ilsanker 6' (o.g.); Sarr 9'; Thauvin 38', (yellow card) 38'; Mitroglou (yellow card) 51'; Payet 60'; Sakai (yellow card) 90', (goal) 90+4'	Report	Bruma 2'; Augustin 55'; Konaté (yellow card) 87'	Stadium: Stade Vélodrome; Attendance: 61,882; Referee: Björn Kuipers (Netherlands)

===== Semi-finals =====
26 April 2018 First leg	Marseille (France)	2–0	(Austria) Red Bull Salzburg	Marseille, France
21:05 CEST (UTC+02:00)	Thauvin 15'; Lopez (yellow card) 21'; N'Jie 63'; Mitroglou (yellow card) 90'	Report	Wolf (yellow card) 22'	Stadium: Stade Vélodrome; Attendance: 62,312; Referee: Willie Collum (Scotland)

3 May 2018 Second leg	Red Bull Salzburg (Austria)	2–1 (a.e.t.) (2–3 agg.)	(France) Marseille	Wals-Siezenheim, Austria
21:05 CEST (UTC+02:00)	Haidara 53', (yellow card) 76' (yellow-red card) 119'; Sarr 65' (o.g.); Ramalho (yellow card) 84'; Ćaleta-Car (yellow card) 94'; Dabour (yellow card) 117'	Report	Sarr (yellow card) 36'; Lopez (yellow card) 39'; Rami (yellow card) 57'; Germain (yellow card) 77'; Payet (yellow card) 84'; Amavi (yellow card) 100'; Rolando 116', (yellow card) 118'; Pelé (yellow card) 120+2'	Stadium: Red Bull Arena; Attendance: 29,520; Referee: Sergei Karasev (Russia)

===== Final =====
16 May 2018 Final	Marseille (France)	0–3	(Spain) Atlético Madrid	Décines-Charpieu, France
20:45 CEST (UTC+02:00)	Amavi (yellow card) 38'; Luiz Gustavo (yellow card) 75'; N'Jie (yellow card) 78'	Report	Griezmann 21', 49'; Vrsaljko (yellow card) 23'; Hernandez (yellow card) 78'; Gabi 89'	Stadium: Parc Olympique Lyonnais; Attendance: 55,768; Referee: Björn Kuipers (Netherlands)

== Statistics ==
=== Appearances and goals ===
No.	Pos	Nat	Player	Total		Ligue 1		Coupe de France		Coupe de la Ligue		UEFA Europa League	
No.	Pos	Nat	Player	Apps	Goals	Apps	Goals	Apps	Goals	Apps	Goals	Apps	Goals
Goalkeepers
1	GK	(France) FRA	Romain Cagnon	0	0	0	0	0	0	0	0	0	0
16	GK	(France) FRA	Yohann Pelé	20	0	7+3	0	1	0	1	0	8	0
30	GK	(France) FRA	Steve Mandanda	45	0	31	0	3	0	0	0	11	0
40	GK	(France) FRA	Florian Escales	0	0	0	0	0	0	0	0	0	0
Defenders
2	DF	(Japan) JPN	Hiroki Sakai	50	1	30+3	0	2	0	1	0	12+2	1
3	DF	(Brazil) BRA	Dória	5	0	1+2	0	0	0	0	0	0+2	0
4	DF	(France) FRA	Boubacar Kamara	14	0	5+1	0	0+2	0	0	0	6	0
6	DF	(Portugal) POR	Rolando	46	2	28+3	1	2	0	1	0	11+1	1
12	DF	(Cameroon) CMR	Henri Bedimo	5	0	0+3	0	1+1	0	0	0	0	0
13	DF	(Tunisia) TUN	Aymen Abdennour	14	0	6+2	0	3	0	1	0	2	0
18	DF	(France) FRA	Jordan Amavi	43	1	24+3	0	2+1	1	1	0	11+1	0
23	DF	(France) FRA	Adil Rami	54	2	33	1	3	0	0	0	17+1	1
Midfielders
8	MF	(France) FRA	Morgan Sanson	53	12	25+8	9	2	1	1	0	16+1	2
10	MF	(France) FRA	Dimitri Payet	47	10	28+3	6	2	1	0	0	11+3	3
17	MF	(Senegal) SEN	Bouna Sarr	48	1	18+11	0	3	0	0+1	0	11+4	1
19	MF	(Brazil) BRA	Luiz Gustavo	57	6	34	5	3	1	0+1	0	19	0
22	MF	(France) FRA	Grégory Sertic	11	0	3+4	0	0	0	0	0	1+3	0
27	MF	(France) FRA	Maxime Lopez	45	1	14+10	0	4	0	0	0	15+2	1
29	MF	(Cameroon) CMR	André-Frank Zambo Anguissa	56	0	26+11	0	1+1	0	1	0	4+12	0
Forwards
5	FW	(Argentina) ARG	Lucas Ocampos	53	16	23+8	9	3+1	3	1	0	14+3	4
11	FW	(Greece) GRE	Kostas Mitroglou	30	13	9+10	9	3	3	1	1	4+3	0
14	FW	(Cameroon) CMR	Clinton N'Jie	26	8	9+13	7	3	1	1	0	0	0
26	FW	(France) FRA	Florian Thauvin	54	26	35	22	1+2	0	1	0	12+3	4
28	FW	(France) FRA	Valère Germain	55	18	24+11	9	1+1	1	0+1	1	14+3	7
33	FW	(Turkey) TUR	Yusuf Sari	4	0	0+1	0	1+2	0	0	0	0	0
Players transferred out during the season
15	DF	(Slovakia) SVK	Tomáš Hubočan	3	0	1	0	0	0	0	0	1+1	0
21	DF	(France) FRA	Patrice Evra	9	0	4	0	0	0	0	0	5	0
24	DF	(France) FRA	Rod Fanni	0	0	0	0	0	0	0	0	0	0
7	MF	(France) FRA	Rémy Cabella	4	1	0+3	1	0	0	0	0	0+1	0

Last updated: 16 May 2018
Source: Competitions

=== Goalscorers ===
As of match played 26 April 2018

Place	Position	Nation	Number	Name	Ligue 1	Coupe de France	Coupe de la Ligue	Europa League	Total
1	FW	(France)	26	Florian Thauvin	22	0	0	4	26
2	FW	(France)	28	Valère Germain	9	1	1	7	18
3	FW	(Argentina)	5	Lucas Ocampos	9	3	0	4	16
4	FW	(Greece)	11	Kostas Mitroglou	9	3	1	0	13
5	MF	(France)	8	Morgan Sanson	9	1	0	2	12
6	MF	(France)	10	Dimitri Payet	6	1	0	3	10
7	FW	(Cameroon)	14	Clinton N'Jie	7	1	0	1	9
8	MF	(Brazil)	19	Luiz Gustavo	5	1	0	0	6
9				Own goal	1	0	0	2	3
10	DF	(France)	23	Adil Rami	1	0	0	1	2
10	DF	(Portugal)	6	Rolando	1	0	0	1	2
12	MF	(France)	—	Rémy Cabella	1	0	0	0	1
12	DF	(France)	18	Jordan Amavi	0	1	0	0	1
12	MF	(France)	27	Maxime Lopez	0	0	0	1	1
12	DF	(Guinea)	17	Bouna Sarr	0	0	0	1	1
12	DF	(Japan)	2	Hiroki Sakai	0	0	0	1	1
TOTALS					80	12	2	28	122
