= Sergei Slepov =

Russian footballer

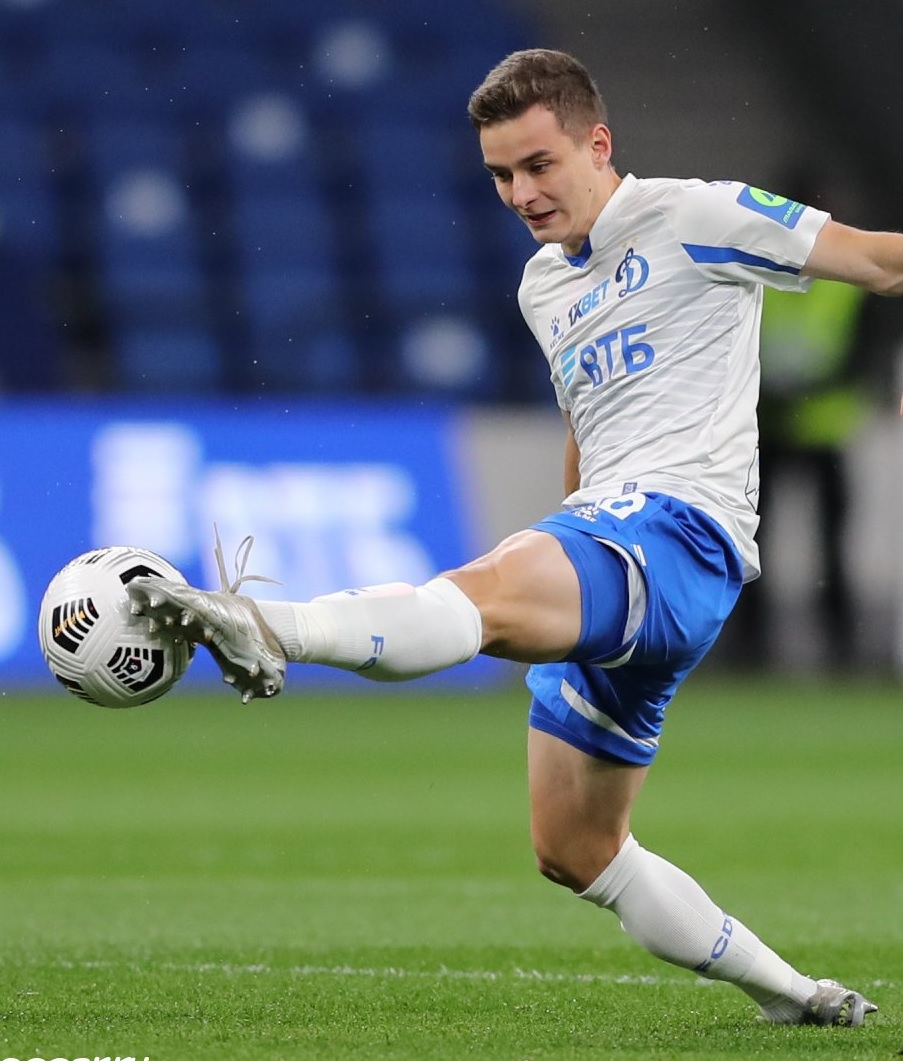
- Slepov with Dynamo Moscow in 2020

Personal information
- Full name: Sergei Viktorovich Slepov
- Date of birth: 19 May 1999 (age 27)
- Place of birth: Yekaterinburg, Russia
- Height: 1.67 m (5 ft 6 in)
- Position: Right-back

Youth career
- Dynamo Moscow

Senior career*
Years	Team	Apps	(Gls)
2017	Dynamo-2 Moscow	5	(1)
2020–2022	Dynamo Moscow	4	(0)
2020–2021	→ Dynamo-2 Moscow	14	(0)
2021–2022	→ Rotor Volgograd (loan)	14	(0)
2022	Krasny (amateur)		
2023	Naftan Novopolotsk	18	(1)
2024	Bumprom Gomel	24	(0)
2025	FC SyndEkat (amateur)		

International career^{‡}
2016	Russia U17	5	(0)
- * Club domestic league appearances and goals as of 10 December 2024 ‡ National team caps and goals as of 23 January 2016

Sergei Viktorovich Slepov (Russian: Сергей Викторович Слепов; born 19 May 1999) is a Russian football player.

== Club career ==
He made his debut in the Russian Premier League for FC Dynamo Moscow on 10 August 2020 in a game against FC Ural Yekaterinburg, he substituted Clinton N'Jie in the 89th minute.

On 22 June 2021, he joined FC Rotor Volgograd on loan for the 2021–22 season.

== Career statistics ==
As of 11 May 2021

Club	Season	League			Cup		Continental		Total	
Club	Season	Division	Apps	Goals	Apps	Goals	Apps	Goals	Apps	Goals
FC Dynamo-2 Moscow	2016–17	PFL	5	1	–		–		5	1
FC Dynamo-2 Moscow	2020–21	PFL	14	0	–		–		14	0
FC Dynamo-2 Moscow	Total		19	1	0	0	0	0	19	1
FC Dynamo Moscow	2020–21	Russian Premier League	4	0	0	0	0	0	4	0
Career total			23	1	0	0	0	0	23	1
