= Clinton N'Jie =

Cameroonian footballer (born 1993)

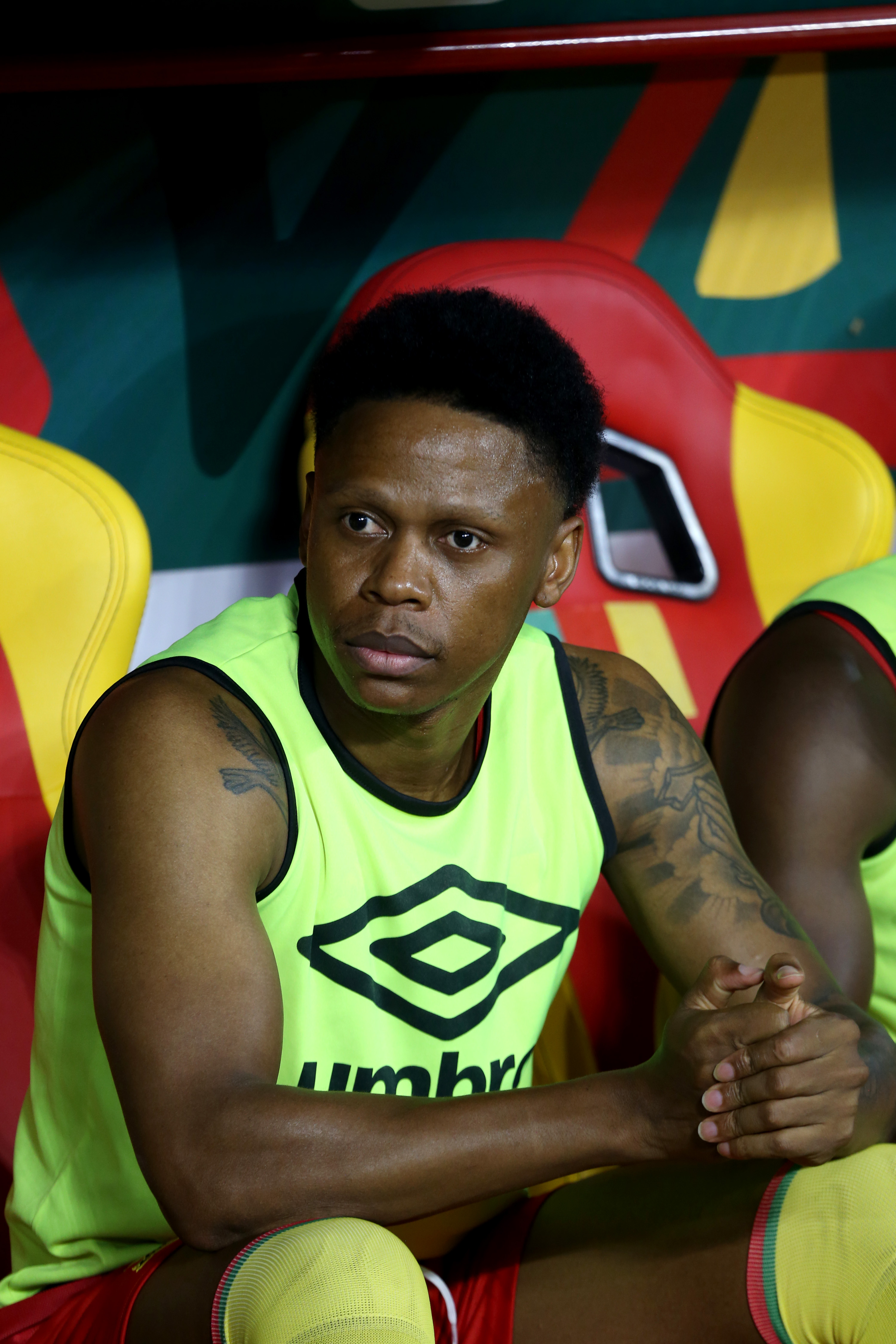
- N'Jie with Cameroon at the 2021 Africa Cup of Nations

Personal information
- Full name: Clinton Mua N'Jie
- Date of birth: 15 August 1993 (age 33)
- Place of birth: Buea, Cameroon
- Height: 1.75 m (5 ft 9 in)
- Positions: Forward; winger

Youth career
- 2006–2011: Brasseries du Cameroun
- 2011–2012: Lyon

Senior career*
Years	Team	Apps	(Gls)
2011–2014	Lyon B	60	(15)
2012–2015	Lyon	37	(7)
2015–2017	Tottenham Hotspur	8	(0)
2016–2017	→ Marseille (loan)	22	(4)
2017–2019	Marseille	39	(10)
2019–2022	Dynamo Moscow	61	(6)
2022–2024	Sivasspor	57	(4)
2024–2025	Rapid București	10	(1)

International career^{‡}
2014–	Cameroon	44	(10)
Medal record
Men's football
Representing Cameroon
Africa Cup of Nations
Winner	2017 Gabon
Third place	2021 Cameroon
- * Club domestic league appearances and goals as of 6 April 2025 ‡ National team caps and goals as of 21 November 2023

Clinton Mua N'Jie (born 15 August 1993) is a Cameroonian professional footballer who plays as a forward.

He started his career with Lyon, going up all the way from the youth program to the B squad and ultimately in the club's top tier squad in the French Ligue 1, before moving to Tottenham Hotspur of the Premier League, and then back to Ligue 1 side Marseille before moving to his current club.

N'Jie made his senior international debut for Cameroon in 2014 and represented the nation at the Africa Cup of Nations in 2015, 2017, 2019 and 2021, winning the 2017 tournament and finishing third in the 2021 tournament.

== Club career ==
=== Lyon ===
N'Jie arrived at Lyon during the summer of 2011. He joined the under-19 squad and quickly progressed to the reserve squad along with Anthony Martial and Nabil Fekir, playing in the French 4th division. He played his first professional match during the 2012–13 season against Stade de Reims in a 3–0 win. N'Jie scored his first professional goal against Mladá Boleslav in the third qualifying round of the 2014–15 UEFA Europa League, helping his team to a 2–1 victory. On 13 August, he scored his first Ligue 1 goal in a 4–0 victory against Lorient. Earlier that day, he signed a three-year contract extension with Lyon through to 2019. Having been shortlisted for the 2014 CAF Most Promising Talent of the Year, N'Jie lost out to Porto and Algeria midfielder Yacine Brahimi. He finished his first full season at Lyon with eight goals and seven assists in 33 appearances, despite only starting half of his 30 league games, as he was the third piece of the Lyon attacking line, with Nabil Fekir and Alexandre Lacazette. N'Jie also finished the season with a 73% shot-on-target ratio, second to only to Paris Saint-Germain's Zlatan Ibrahimović, who ended the campaign on 74%.

=== Tottenham Hotspur ===
On 15 August 2015, English side Tottenham Hotspur announced that the club had reached an agreement for the signing of N'Jie from Lyon, subject to international clearance and a work permit. N'Jie agreed to a five-year contract with a reported transfer fee of €12 million (£8.3 million). N'Jie made his Spurs debut on 17 September in a Europa League group stage match against Qarabağ, coming on as a substitute for Andros Townsend. On 10 December 2015, he tore his medial collateral ligament (MCL) after a challenge by Jérémy Toulalan during a Europa League group stage match against Monaco. He had to undergo knee surgery for the MCL tear and was expected to out of action for at least 1–2 months, and possibly longer. Working with injured teammate Jan Vertonghen during his recovery, N'Jie eventually made his return on 8 May 2016 in a Premier League match against Southampton, in what would be his final appearance of the season.

N'Jie made 8 appearances (all of them as a substitute) for Tottenham in the Premier League, his longest a 79-minute affair when he replaced the injured Nacer Chadli against Liverpool. In addition, N'Jie made 5 appearances, starting in 2 of them, in Tottenham's Europa League campaign, and did not score a goal in all competitions.

=== Marseille ===
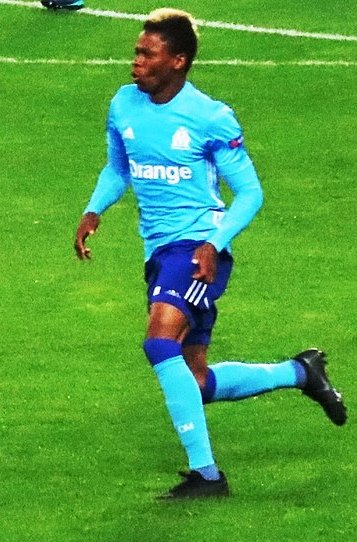
N'Jie with Marseille in 2018

On 31 August 2016, N'Jie returned to Ligue 1, joining Marseille on a season-long loan deal. Marseille had a €7 million option to buy him at the end of the loan, and Georges-Kévin Nkoudou headed to White Hart Lane on a permanent move in the opposite direction. On 11 September, he made his debut as a substitute for William Vainqueur in the 68th minute away to Nice, and he scored his first goal two weeks later to equalise in a 2–1 home win against Nantes.

On 16 July 2017, N'Jie made his move to Marseille permanent, signing for an undisclosed fee. On 6 August, in the season opener against Dijon, he came on at half time for injured captain Dimitri Payet and scored two goals in a 3–0 win. On 17 September, he scored both the goals in the away win over Amiens. On 3 May 2018, he played in the Europa League semi-finals away to FC Red Bull Salzburg as Marseille played out a 2–1 away loss but a 3–2 aggregate win to secure a place in the 2018 UEFA Europa League Final.

=== Dynamo Moscow ===
On 25 July 2019, N'Jie signed a four-year contract with Russian Premier League club Dynamo Moscow. He scored his first goal for Dynamo on 27 October 2019, a late winner in a 1–0 victory over PFC CSKA Moscow. N'Jie left Dynamo by mutual consent on 5 July 2022.

=== Sivasspor ===
On 29 July 2022, N'Jie signed with Sivasspor on a two-year contract.

=== Rapid București ===
On 11 September 2024, N'Jie joined Romanian Liga I club Rapid București on a two-year deal.

As of October 2026, N'Jie has been without a club for over a year but has stated that he has not retired from professional football and remains open to a new project.

== International career ==
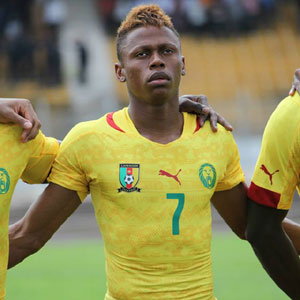
N'Jie with Cameroon in 2015

N'Jie scored 44 minutes into his Cameroon debut against the Democratic Republic of Congo on 6 September 2014, and followed this up four days later by scoring twice in a 4–1 victory over Ivory Coast at the Ahmadou Ahidjo Stadium in Yaoundé, Cameroon. He was named in the squad for the 2015 Africa Cup of Nations and played in one group stage match, coming on as a 67th-minute substitute in a 1–0 loss to Ivory Coast. He won the 2017 Africa Cup of Nations. On 3 February 2022, during the 2021 Africa Cup of Nations, N'Jie missed the last penalty against Egypt. As a consequence, Cameroon was disqualified and Egypt secured a spot in the final against Senegal.

== Style of play ==
N'Jie is a pacy forward who likes to play on the shoulder of the last defender, just off the front man. He can also play off the wing, and as dribbling is a key attribute of his game, he likes to take on players when given the chance. He frequently draws comparisons to Cameroon's all-time leading scorer and compatriot Samuel Eto'o, with this comparison being asserted by Lyon chairman Jean-Michel Aulas.

== Career statistics ==
=== Club ===
As of match played 6 April 2025

Appearances and goals by club, season and competition
Club	Season	League			National cup (Note: Includes Coupe de France, FA Cup, Russian Cup, Turkish Cup)		League cup (Note: Includes Coupe de la Ligue, EFL Cup)		Europe		Total	
Club	Season	Division	Apps	Goals	Apps	Goals	Apps	Goals	Apps	Goals	Apps	Goals
Lyon B	2011–12	CFA	14	5	—		—		—		14	5
Lyon B	2012–13	CFA	26	2	—		—		—		26	2
Lyon B	2013–14	CFA	19	8	—		—		—		19	8
Lyon B	2014–15	CFA	1	0	—		—		—		1	0
Lyon B	Total		60	15	—		—		—		60	15
Lyon	2012–13	Ligue 1	4	0	0	0	0	0	0	0	4	0
Lyon	2013–14	Ligue 1	3	0	0	0	0	0	3 (Note: Appearances in UEFA Europa League)	0	6	0
Lyon	2014–15	Ligue 1	30	7	1	0	0	0	2	1	33	8
Lyon	Total		37	7	1	0	0	0	5	1	43	8
Tottenham Hotspur	2015–16	Premier League	8	0	0	0	1	0	5	0	14	0
Marseille (loan)	2016–17	Ligue 1	22	4	1	0	0	0	—		23	4
Marseille	2017–18	Ligue 1	22	7	3	1	1	0	13	1	39	9
Marseille	2018–19	Ligue 1	17	3	0	0	1	0	3	0	21	3
Marseille	Total		61	14	4	1	2	0	16	1	83	16
Dynamo Moscow	2019–20	Russian Premier League	19	1	0	0	—		—		19	1
Dynamo Moscow	2020–21	Russian Premier League	23	4	1	0	—		1	0	25	4
Dynamo Moscow	2021–22	Russian Premier League	19	1	3	0	—		—		22	1
Dynamo Moscow	Total		61	6	4	0	—		1	0	66	6
Sivasspor	2022–23	Süper Lig	29	2	3	1	—		9 (Note: Two appearances in UEFA Europa League, seven appearances in UEFA Europa Conference League)	0	41	3
Sivasspor	2023–24	Süper Lig	28	2	3	0	—		—		31	2
Sivasspor	Total		57	4	6	1	—		9	0	72	5
Rapid București	2024–25	Liga I	10	1	2	1	—		—		12	2
Career total			294	47	17	3	3	0	36	2	350	52

=== International ===
As of match played 21 November 2023

Appearances and goals by national team and year
National team	Year	Apps	Goals
Cameroon	2014	6	3
Cameroon	2015	8	3
Cameroon	2016	2	0
Cameroon	2017	6	1
Cameroon	2018	4	0
Cameroon	2019	6	2
Cameroon	2020	2	1
Cameroon	2021	2	0
Cameroon	2022	6	0
Cameroon	2023	2	0
Total		44	10

Scores and results list Cameroon's goal tally first, score column indicates score after each N'Jie goal.

List of international goals scored by Clinton N'Jie
No.	Date	Venue	Opponent	Score	Result	Competition
1	6 September 2014	Stade TP Mazembe, Lubumbashi, Democratic Republic of Congo	DR Congo	1–0	2–0	2015 Africa Cup of Nations qualification
2	10 September 2014	Stade Ahmadou Ahidjo, Yaoundé, Cameroon	Ivory Coast	1–0	4–1	2015 Africa Cup of Nations qualification
3	10 September 2014	Stade Ahmadou Ahidjo, Yaoundé, Cameroon	Ivory Coast	4–1	4–1	2015 Africa Cup of Nations qualification
4	30 March 2015	Rajamangala Stadium, Bangkok, Thailand	Thailand	2–2	3–2	Friendly
5	6 June 2015	Stade Olympique Yves-du-Manoir, Colombes, France	Burkina Faso	2–2	3–2	Friendly
6	6 June 2015	Stade Olympique Yves-du-Manoir, Colombes, France	Burkina Faso	3–2	3–2	Friendly
7	7 October 2017	Stade Ahmadou Ahidjo, Yaoundé, Cameroon	Algeria	1–0	2–0	2018 FIFA World Cup qualification
8	23 March 2019	Stade Ahmadou Ahidjo, Yaoundé, Cameroon	Comoros	3–0	3–0	2019 Africa Cup of Nations qualification
9	6 July 2019	Alexandria Stadium, Alexandria, Egypt	Nigeria	2–1	2–3	2019 Africa Cup of Nations
10	12 November 2020	Stade de la Réunification, Douala, Cameroon	Mozambique	4–1	4–1	2021 Africa Cup of Nations qualification

== Honours ==
Lyon

- Coupe de la Ligue runner-up: 2013–14
- Trophée des Champions runner-up: 2015

Marseille

- UEFA Europa League runner-up: 2017–18

Dynamo Moscow

- Russian Cup runner-up: 2021–22

Sivasspor

- Turkish Super Cup runner-up: 2022

Cameroon

- Africa Cup of Nations: 2017
- Africa Cup of Nations third place: 2022
