= Nicolas Basin =

French professional footballer (born 1998)

Personal information
- Date of birth: 22 July 1998 (age 28)
- Place of birth: Forbach, France
- Height: 1.69 m (5 ft 7 in)
- Position: Left-back

Senior career*
Years	Team	Apps	(Gls)
2015–2019	Metz B	29	(0)
2016–2018	Metz	6	(1)
2018–2019	→ Avranches (loan)	4	(0)
2018–2019	→ Avranches (loan)	2	(0)
Total		41	(1)
- * Club domestic league appearances and goals

Nicolas Basin (born 22 July 1998) is a French former professional footballer who played as a left-back.

== Career ==
Basin is a youth exponent from FC Metz. He made his debut for the Ligue 1 side on 13 August 2016 against Lille replacing Iván Balliu in the 65th minute of a 3–2 home win.

He retired in January 2021 due to recurring injury problems and a badly damaged knee. With his Metz contract running out in June he started studying medicine.

== Career statistics ==
Appearances and goals by club, season and competition
Club	Season	League			Coupe de France		Coupe de la Ligue		Europe		Total	
Club	Season	Division	Apps	Goals	Apps	Goals	Apps	Goals	Apps	Goals	Apps	Goals
Metz II	2015–16	Championnat National 3 (Note: "Championnat de France Amateur 2" until 2017)	3	0	–		–		—		3	0
Metz II	2016–17	Championnat National 3	14	0	–		–		—		14	0
Metz II	2017–18	Championnat National 3	12	0	–		–		—		12	0
Metz II	Total		29	0	0	0	0	0	0	0	29	0
Metz	2016–17	Ligue 1	1	0	0	0	0	0	—		1	0
Metz	2017–18	Ligue 1	5	1	0	0	0	0	—		5	1
Metz	Total		6	1	0	0	0	0	0	0!0	6	1
Avranches (loan)	2018–19	Championnat National	4	0	0	0	0	0	—		4	0
Avranches II (loan)	2018–19	Championnat National 3	2	0	–		–		—		2	0
Career total			41	1	0	0	0	0	0	0	41	1
