= HNTB =

American infrastructure design firm

HNTB Corporation

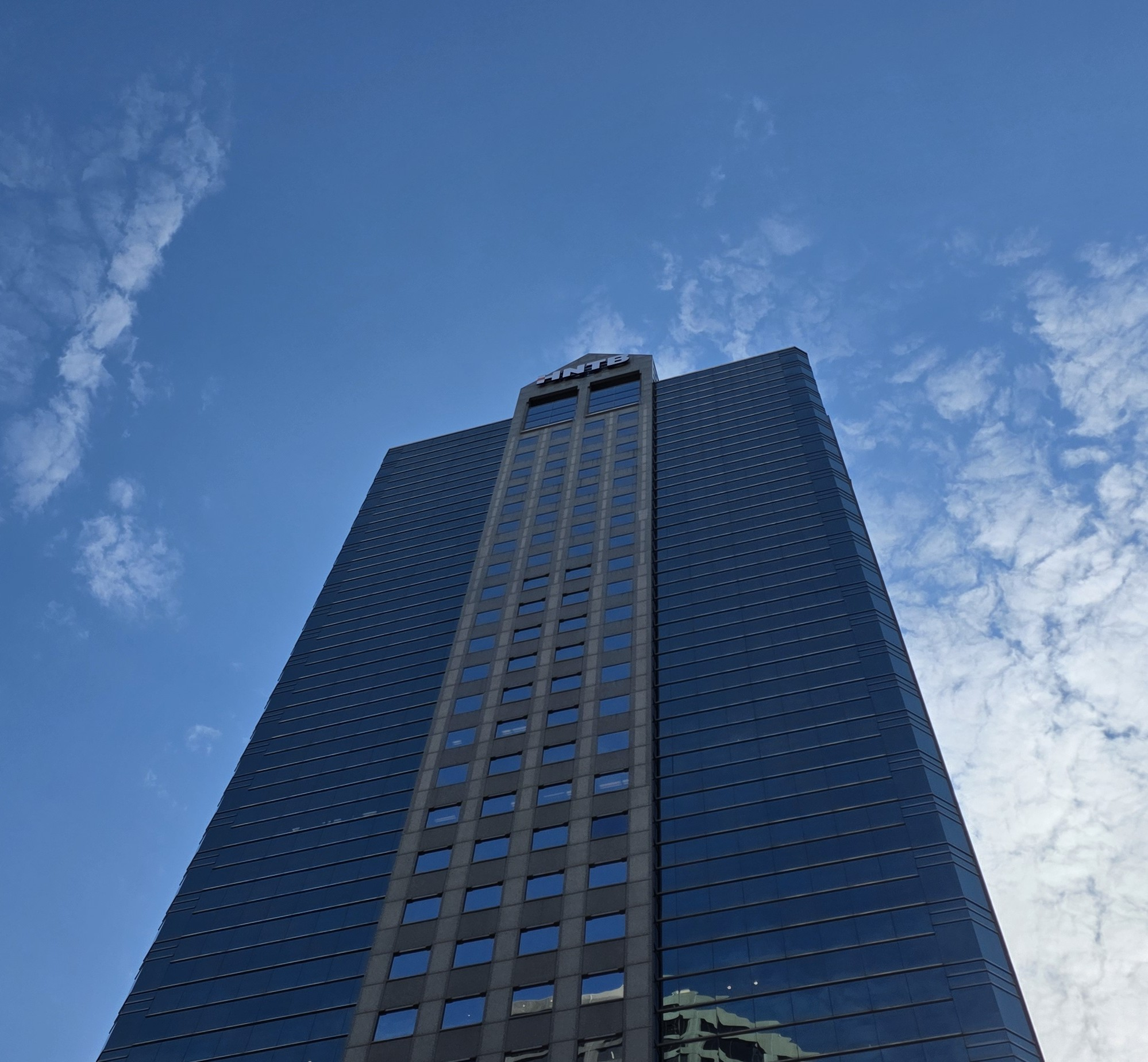
- A picture of the Town Pavilion with the HNTB logo on the West side (1111 Main St) Kansas City, Missouri
- Type: Employee owned corporation
- Industry: Infrastructure Solutions
- Headquarters: Kansas City, Missouri, U.S. (as Harrington, Howard & Ash)
- Area served: Worldwide
- Key people: Robert Slimp (Chairman, President, and CEO of HNTB Holdings, Ltd.)
- Website: www.hntb.com

HNTB Corporation is an American architectural and infrastructure design firm. Founded in 1914 in Kansas City, Missouri, HNTB began with the partnership made by Ernest Emmanuel Howard with the firm Waddell & Harrington, founded in 1907.

HNTB is a top-twenty U.S.-based civil engineering and architecture design firm and its architecture division generated $693 million in 2022, the second most of any architectural firm in the U.S. The firm specializes in sporting facilities; Levi's Stadium, in which HNTB was ranked third on a list of the World's Top 10 Most Innovative Companies of 2015, and Allegiant Stadium; transportation services such as airports, bridges, tunnels, roadways, and rail and transit systems, including renovations in places such as at Los Angeles International Airport and Dallas Fort Worth International Airport, and projects for educational institutions, which includes at the College of William & Mary, University of Southern California, and University of Michigan. The firm consists of around 7,200 professional staff across 79 locations, and is active in all major architectural specialties in the United States and around the world.

== History ==
Waddell & Harrington was formed in 1907 as a partnership between John Alexander Low Waddell and John Lyle Harrington and was based in Kansas City, Missouri, but had offices in Portland, Oregon, and Vancouver, British Columbia. The company designed more than 30 vertical-lift bridges for highways and railroads. After Howard's partnership, Waddell & Harrington eventually became Harrington, Howard & Ash. In 1941, it changed its name to Howard, Needles, Tammen & Bergendoff when Enoch Needles, Henry Tammen & Ruben Bergendoff joined as partners. In 1975, it merged with Kivett and Myers to form a sports architecture practice. In 1982, it acquired the rail firm of Thomas K. Dyer adding track, signal, communications and traction power to its portfolio, thus positioning the firm to serve the rail industry. In 1993, it formally changed its name to HNTB Corporation. In 2000, the firm became employee-owned.

== Services ==
=== Architecture ===
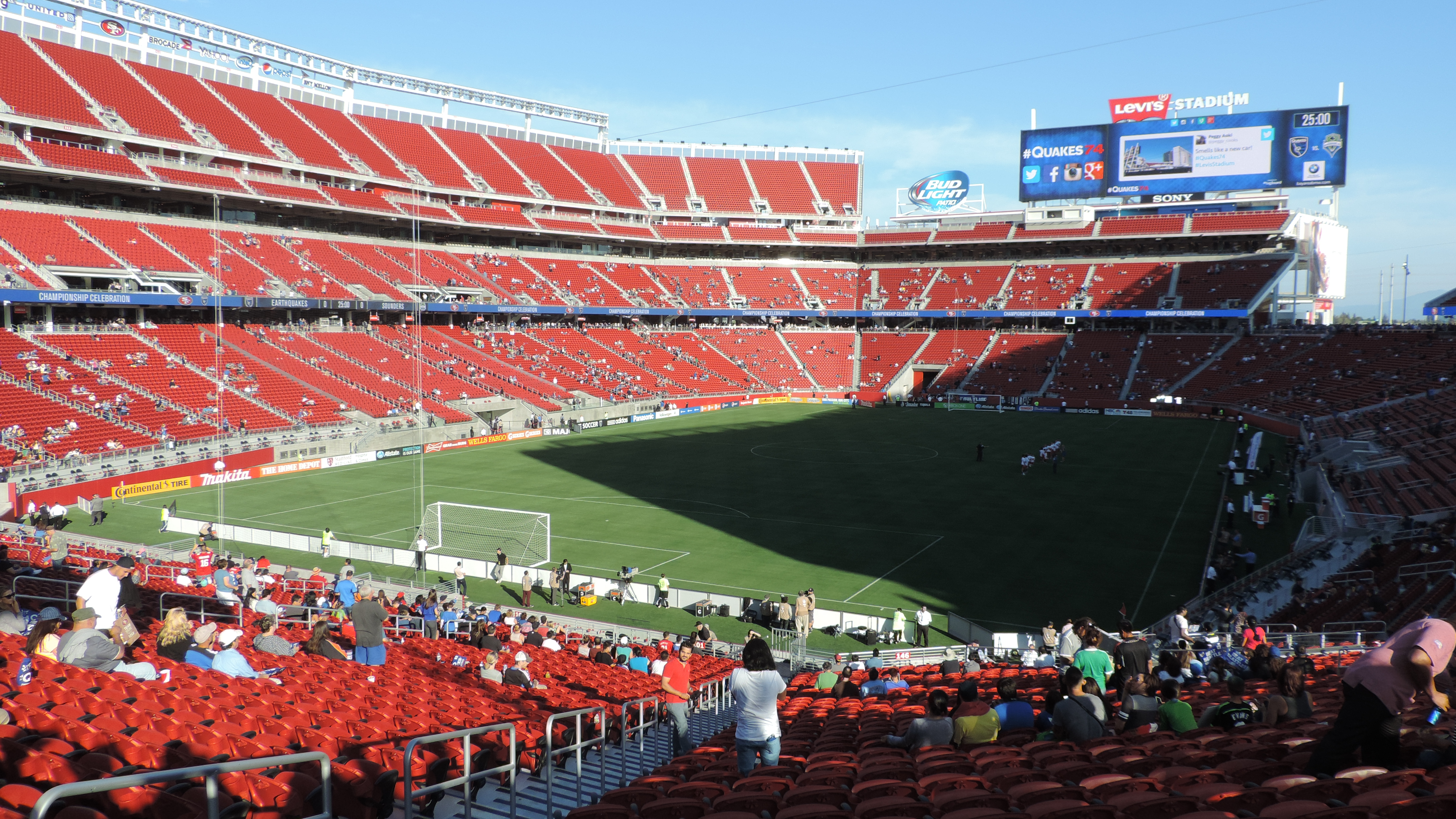
Levi's Stadium, designed by HNTB, broke ground on April 19, 2012 and was opened on July 17, 2014. The estimate construction cost was US$1.3 billion.

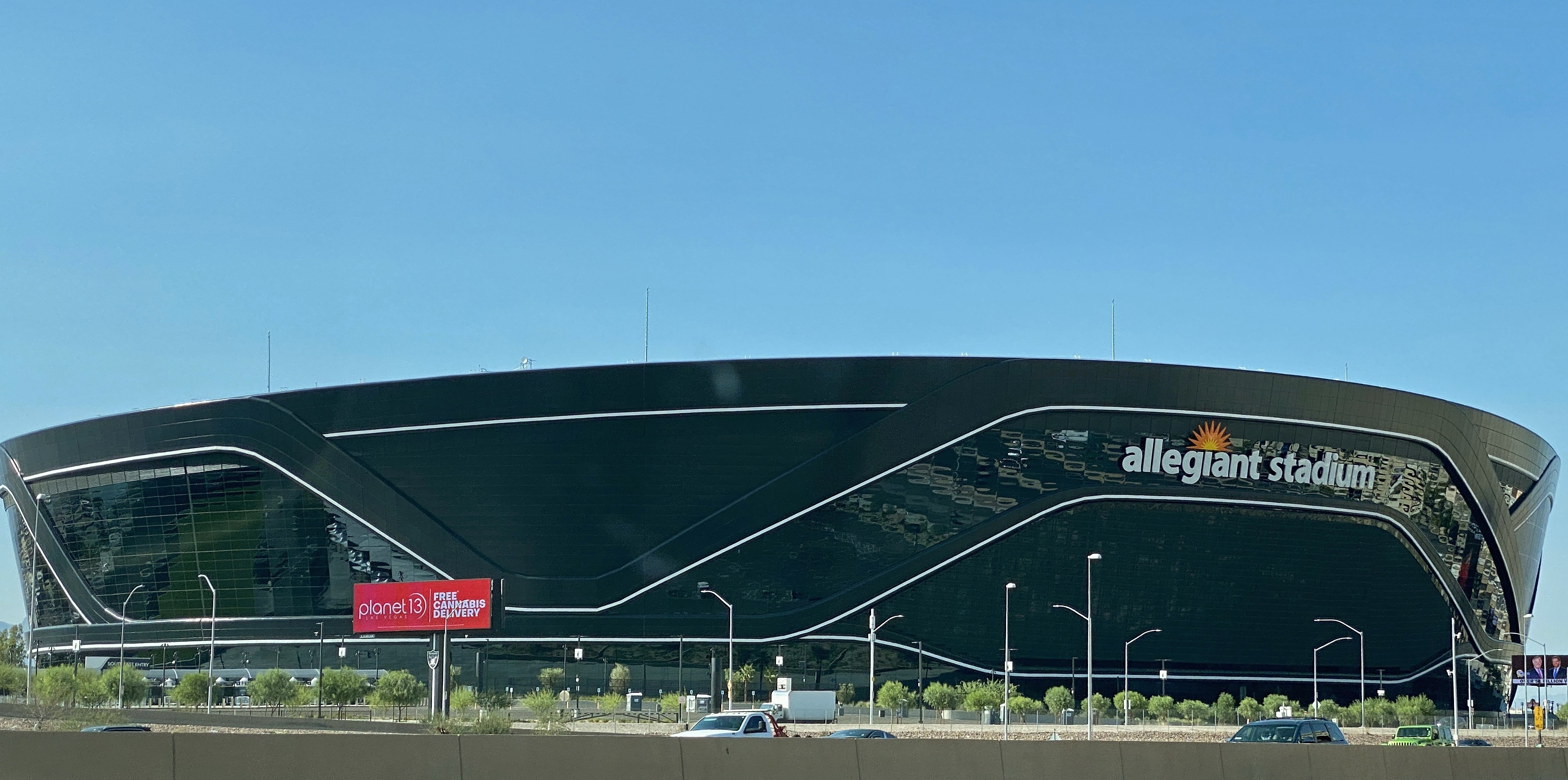
Along with MANICA Architecture, HNTB developed the new home for the Las Vegas Raiders, Allegiant Stadium. Work began on November 13, 2017, was opened on July 31, 2020, and had a US$1.9 billion construction cost.

HNTB's architecture projects have included Levi's Stadium in San Francisco, home of the San Francisco 49ers, completed in 2014; the Wichita Dwight D. Eisenhower Airport terminal, which opened in 2015; an expansion of Kroger Field at the University of Kentucky; Camping World Stadium reconstruction in Orlando in 2014; and Bartle Hall Convention Center Ballroom Expansion in 2007.

HNTB will assist MANICA Architecture in designing and building a new stadium for the Kansas City Chiefs in Kansas City, Kansas.

=== Aviation ===
In 2014, Airport Business Magazine recognized two of the company's aviation experts, James Long PE and Jennie Santoro, with a "Top 40 Under 40" award. In 2015, HNTB's Clint Laaser, RA, LEED AP, received the same recognition. The annual award by the magazine recognizes 40 aviation industry professionals under the age of 40 for their academic, professional and community achievements.

HNTB's aviation projects have earned several awards. The firm created the conceptual design for the 221-foot-tall air traffic control tower at San Francisco International Airport. In 2016, the project earned a Grand Conceptor Award from the American Council of Engineering Companies for the structural engineer of record (Walter P Moore). HNTB was lead architect and performed initial planning and engineering services on the San Diego International Terminal 2 expansion project. In 2014, the project earned a Best of the Best Projects award from Engineering News-Record in the Airport/Transit category.

Currently, HNTB is the architect of record on Orlando International Airport's new south terminal project. The project won a 2017 American Architecture Award. The firm also supports mentoring programs for young professionals in the aviation market.

=== Bridges ===
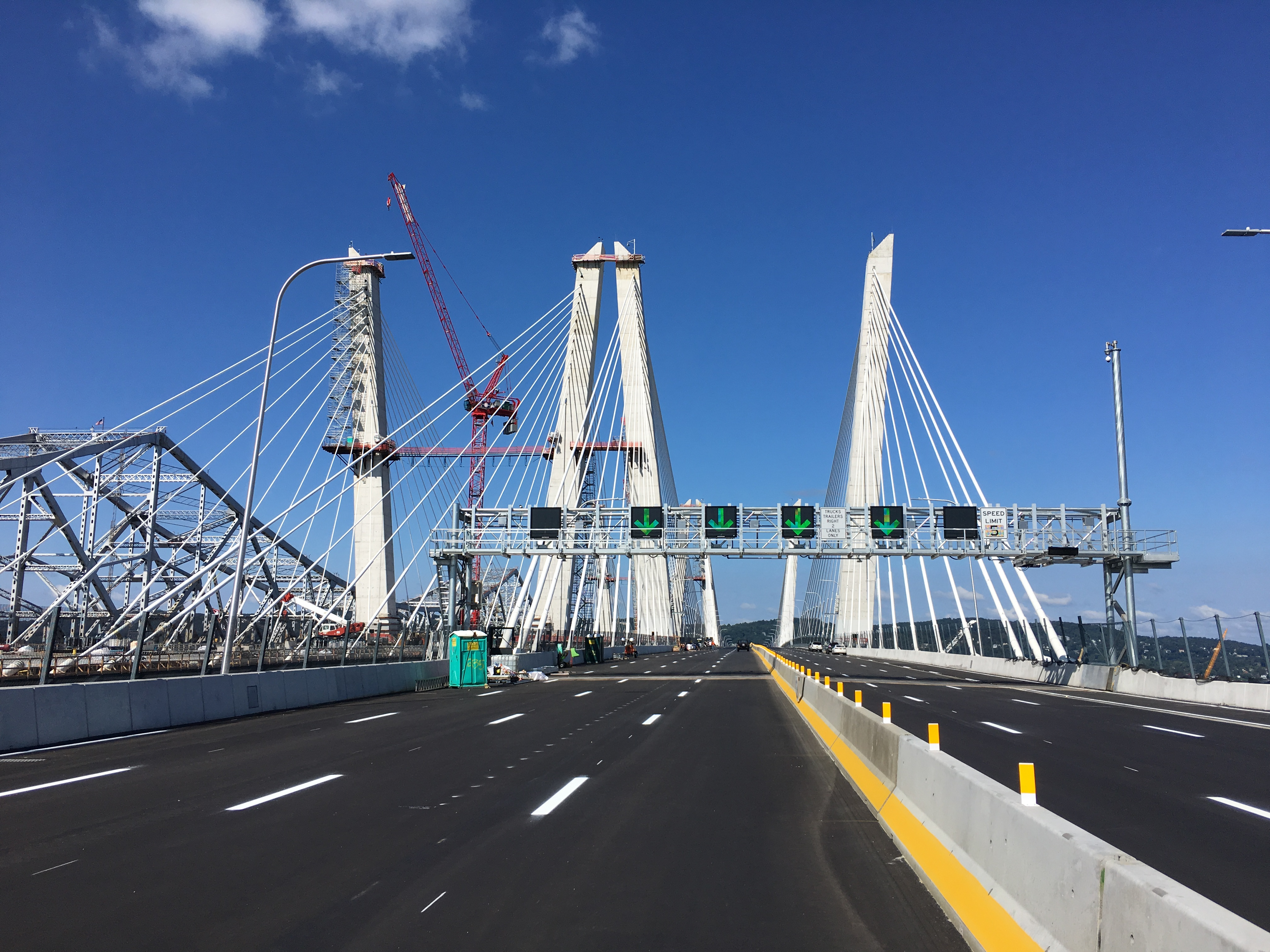
The new Tappan Zee Bridge before its opening in 2017. HNTB was the owner's engineer for the project.

Ted Zoli is currently the national bridge chief engineer at HNTB.

In 2016, the National Steel Bridge Alliance gave HNTB awards for several bridge projects. These included the South Park Bascule Bridge in Seattle; the Portsmouth Memorial Bridge between New Hampshire and Maine; the Stan Musial Veterans Memorial Bridge in St. Louis; and the Falls Flyover Ramp in Wichita, Kansas.

HNTB serves as owner's engineer for the New York State Thruway Authority on the New NY Bridge project, which replaces the Tappan Zee Bridge over the Hudson River in New York. The new bridge is called the Gov. Mario M. Cuomo Bridge.

HNTB was project oversight representative for the Florida Department of Transportation on the Sisters Creek Bridge replacement in Jacksonville, Florida. In 2017, the project earned a National Awards of Merit in the Transportation category from the Design-Build Institute of America.

HNTB led the final design for the Leonard P. Zakim Bunker Hill Memorial Bridge in Boston.

The company won an award for the repair of the John E. Mathews Bridge after it was severely damaged by a ship impact in September 2013.

=== DOTs ===
HNTB serves, and has previously served, on a variety of projects for state departments of transportation across the U.S. The firm's DOT work has included construction engineering and inspection services on the I-595 Express Corridor Improvements Project for the Florida Department of Transportation, the Johnson County Gateway Interchange for the Kansas Department of Transportation, and program management consultant services on the U.S. 290 Corridor rebuild for the Texas Department of Transportation.

Additionally, the firm has served on the I-94 reconstruction for the Michigan Department of Transportation, the Milwaukee Zoo Interchange for the Wisconsin Department of Transportation, and the Poplar Street Bridge project for the Missouri Department of Transportation.

=== Intelligent transportation systems ===
HNTB's intelligent transportation systems projects have included system design and maintenance and operations services for a smart truck parking system in Michigan and the Tampa Bay SunGuide Center.

HNTB also supports the Tampa Hillsborough Expressway Authority on Tampa Connected Vehicle Pilot and a Truck Parking Availability System for the Florida Department of Transportation.

=== Tolls ===
HNTB supported the Florida Department of Transportation to complete I-595 Corridor Roadway Improvements in Broward County, Florida, which reached substantial completion in 2014.

=== Transit/Rail ===
HNTB works on transit stations, commuter rail, Bus Rapid Transit, Positive Train Control, streetcars and others.

The company is a supporter of high-speed rail projects.

HNTB provided several services on the Chicago Transit Authority Red Line Wilson Station Reconstruction Project in Chicago, including train control, communications, mechanical, architectural, environmental mitigation support and structural. The project was completed in 2017.

HNTB was part of a joint venture that was lead designer on the Dallas Area Rapid Transit South Oak Cliff Extension 3 project. The project was completed in 2016.

HNTB won the 2017 Bronze Engineering Excellence Award from the American Council of Engineering Companies of Massachusetts for its work supporting the Massachusetts Bay Transportation Authority on the Fitchburg Commuter Rail Improvement Program.

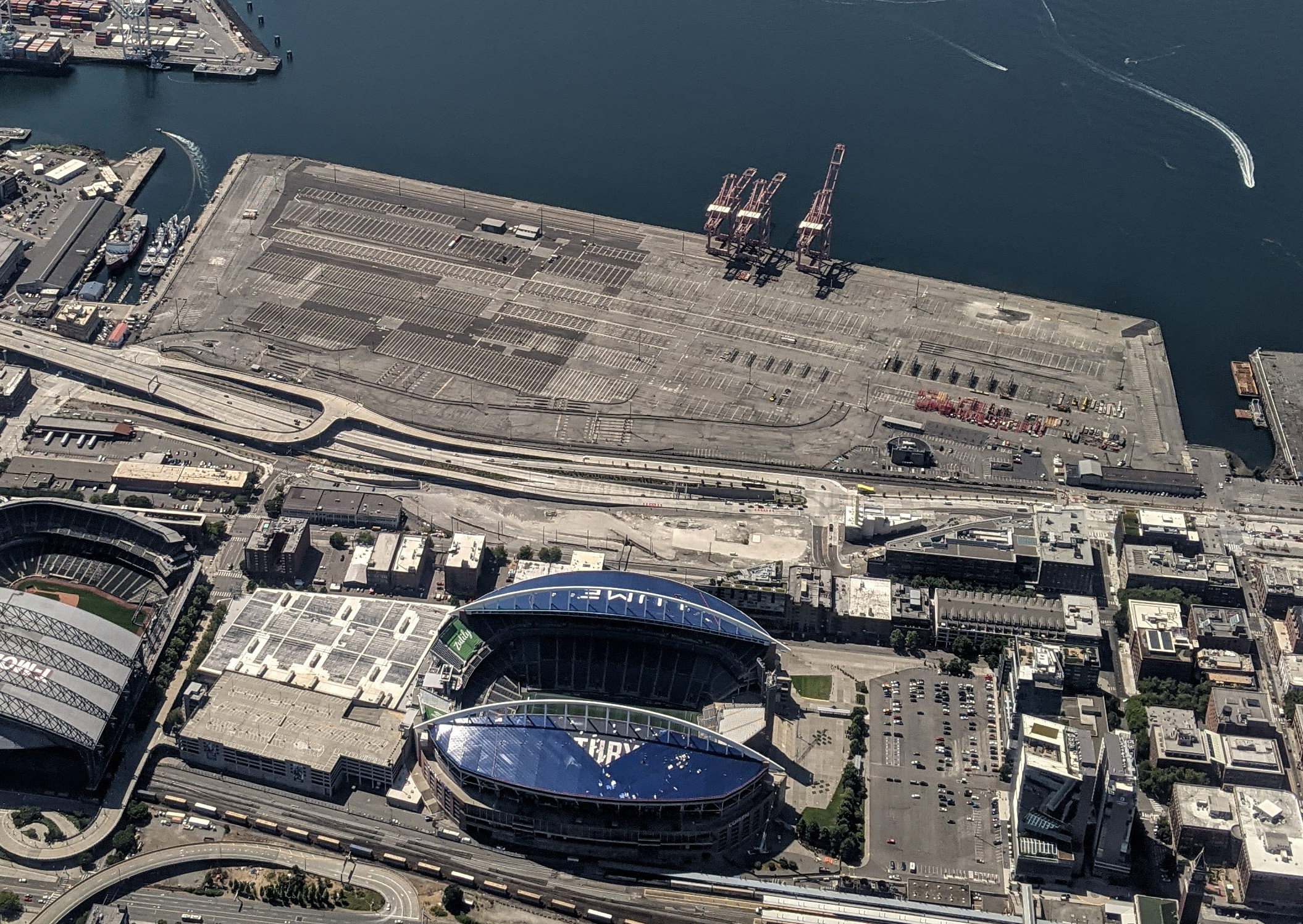
The south portal of SR99 Tunnel Project, near completion on 2021, running off alongside Lumen Field and T-Mobile Park from an aerial view.

=== Tunnels ===
HNTB was lead designer for the SR99 Tunnel Project in Seattle. The tunnel was completed in 2017 and opened in 2019.

HNTB was the independent design verifier for the Istanbul Strait Crossing tunnel in Turkey. The tunnel, also known as the Eurasia Tunnel, established a connection between the European and Asian sides of the city, and opened in 2016. The project won a 2016 Global Best Project award from Engineering News-Record, and engineering industry publication, in the Bridge/Tunnel category.

== Awards ==
The Milwaukee Office (Milwaukee, Wisconsin) was named No 1. Best Place to Work in Milwaukee in 2020, 2021, & 2022 by Milwaukee's Business Journal.

Ashley Booth, HNTB's national streetcar practice leader, was named to Mass Transit Magazine's Top 40 Under 40 2017 list.

Tim Faerber, PE, a senior vice president at HNTB, received ENR Midwest's Legacy Award in 2017. Faerber was the fourth person to win the award. During his career, he has led HNTB's Illinois operations and was Great Lakes Division president from 2010 to 2013.

Diana Mendes, HNTB's transit/rail market sector leader, Mid-Atlantic Division president and senior vice president, was awarded the 2017 Training Professional of the Year Award by the National Transit Institute.

In 2006, the American Public Works Association named the High Five Interchange as the "Public Works Project of the Year" for its massive size, its innovative design, the complexity and rapidity of its construction and the need it fulfilled for the community. HNTB Corporation received the award as the primary consultant, along with the Texas Department of Transportation as the managing agency and Zachry Construction Corporation as the primary contractor. The award was in recognition of their cooperative alliance in completing the project.
