= Arrowhead Stadium =

Stadium in Kansas City, Missouri

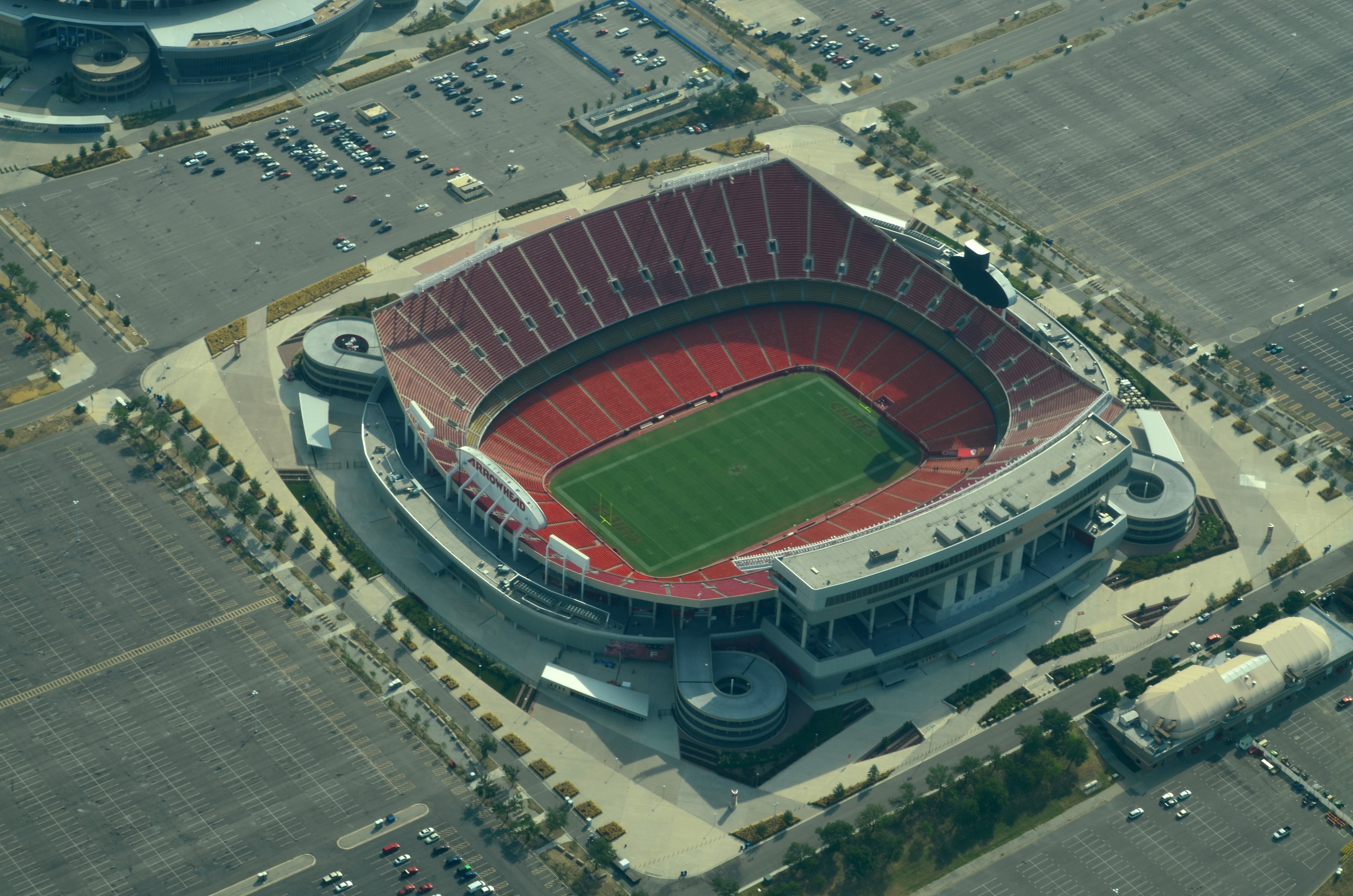
- Aerial view from west in 2013

- Location in the United States Location in Missouri
- Former names: GEHA Field at Arrowhead Stadium (2021–2026); Kansas City Stadium (2026 FIFA World Cup)
- Address: 1 Arrowhead Drive
- Location: Kansas City, Missouri, U.S.
- Coordinates: 39°2′56″N 94°29′2″W
- Elevation: 840 feet (260 m) AMSL
- Owner: Jackson County; Sports Complex Authority
- Operator: Kansas City Chiefs; 1972–2030
- Capacity: 76,416 (2010–present) Former capacity: List: 78,097 (1972–1994); 79,101 (1995–1996); 79,451 (1997–2009); 69,045 (2026 FIFA World Cup)
- Executive suites: 128
- Surface: TartanTurf (1972–1993); Latitude 36 Bermuda Grass (1994–2012); NorthBridge Bermudagrass (2013–present)
- Public transit: KCATA: Route 47

Construction
- Groundbreaking: July 11, 1968; 58 years ago
- Opened: August 12, 1972; 54 years ago
- Renovated: 1991, 1994, 2007–2010
- Expanded: 1995, 1997
- Cost: US$43 million ($331 million in 2025 dollars) US$375 million (2007–2010 renovation) ($554 million in 2025 dollars)
- Architects: Kivett and Myers; Populous (formerly HOK Sport) (2007–2010 renovations)
- Structural engineers: Bob D. Campbell & Co. Structural Engineers
- General contractor: Sharp-Kidde-Webb Joint Venture

Tenants
- Kansas City Chiefs (NFL) 1972–present Kansas City Wizards (MLS) 1996–2007; Kansas Jayhawks 2024

Website
- chiefs.com/stadium

Arrowhead Stadium is an American football stadium in Kansas City, Missouri, United States. It primarily serves as the home venue of the Kansas City Chiefs of the National Football League (NFL), and has also hosted other soccer games and college football games for regional teams. Arrowhead Stadium hosted multiple matches during the 2026 FIFA World Cup.

It was built at the same time as neighboring Kauffman Stadium, home of Major League Baseball's Kansas City Royals, which together form the Truman Sports Complex. Opened 54 years ago in 1972, Arrowhead is currently the oldest stadium in the American Football Conference (AFC). It has a seating capacity of 76,416 making it the 25th-largest stadium in the United States and the sixth-largest NFL stadium. It is also the largest sports facility by capacity in the state of Missouri. A $375 million renovation was completed in 2010.

== History ==
The Dallas Texans of the American Football League (AFL) relocated to Kansas City in 1963 and rebranded as the Chiefs. They played their home games at Municipal Stadium, sharing the stadium with the Kansas City Athletics of Major League Baseball. After the 1967 season, the Athletics relocated to Oakland, California, and the expansion Kansas City Royals arrived in 1969.

Built in 1923 and mostly rebuilt in 1955, Municipal Stadium seated approximately 35,000 for football; as part of the AFL–NFL merger announced in 1966, NFL stadiums would henceforth be required to seat no fewer than 50,000. The loss of the A's was a shock to local sports fans and community leaders and there was a growing sense that government subsidy of a stadium complex would be necessary to keep major league baseball and professional football in the city.

When Kansas City was unable to find a suitable location for a new stadium, Jackson County stepped in and offered a location on the eastern edge of town near the interchange of Interstate 70 and Interstate 435. Voters approved a $102 million bond issue in 1967 to build a new sports complex with two stadiums. The original design called for construction of side-by-side baseball and football stadiums with a common roof that would roll between them. This design proved to be more complicated and expensive than originally thought and so was scrapped in favor of a more conventional open-air configuration. The Chiefs staff, led by team general manager Jack Steadman, helped develop the complex.

=== Construction ===
Construction began in 1968. The original two-stadium concept was initially designed by Denver architect Charles Deaton and Steadman. The baseball and football stadiums have a very different appearance, but share utilities, parking, and underground storage. Plans to have covered stadiums were dropped, leaving two open-air stadiums. Lamar Hunt included an owner's suite, complete with three bedrooms, bathrooms, a kitchen, and a living room, to the design of the football stadium. To increase seating while limiting the stadium's footprint, the upper sections were placed at a steep incline which cannot be replicated in modern stadiums due to accessibility regulations.

Deaton's design was implemented by the Kansas City architectural firm of Kivett & Myers. Arrowhead Stadium is considered by some to have had an influence on the design of several future NFL stadiums. Construction of the stadium was a joint venture Sharp-Kidde-Webb construction firms.

=== 1970s ===
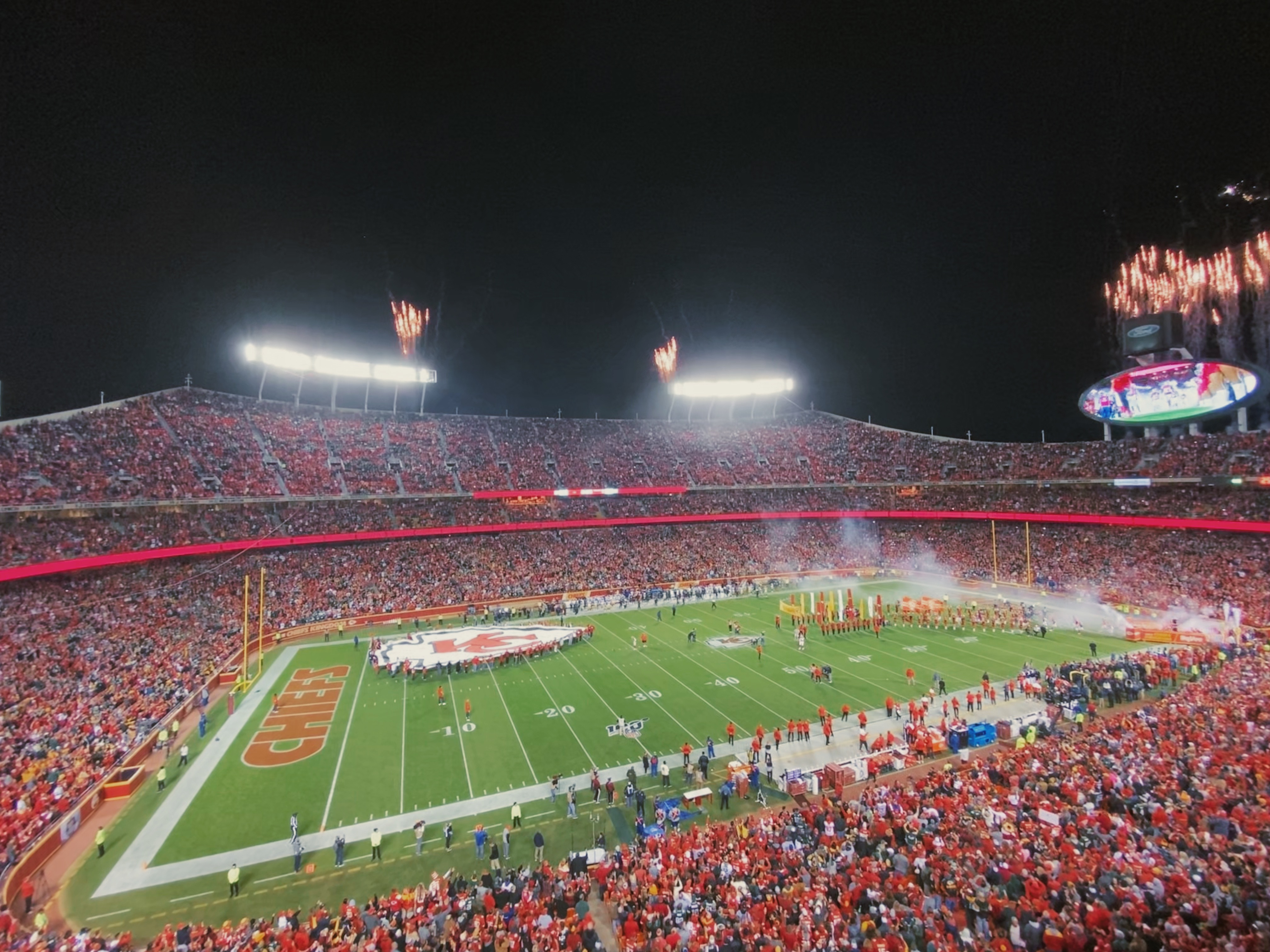
Arrowhead Stadium at night, prior to a game against the Green Bay Packers.

Construction on Arrowhead Stadium was completed in time for the 1972 preseason. On Saturday night, August 12, the Chiefs defeated the St. Louis Cardinals 24–14 in the first NFL preseason game at Arrowhead Stadium.

In the regular season opener at Arrowhead Stadium on September 17, the Chiefs were defeated 20–10 by the Miami Dolphins; the teams had met in the previous postseason on Christmas Day in the divisional round, the final football game at Municipal Stadium. The Dolphins won with a field goal in double-overtime; at 82 minutes and forty seconds, the game remains as the longest in NFL history.

That first season, the largest attendance at Arrowhead Stadium (82,094) saw the Chiefs defeat the divisional rival Oakland Raiders 27–14 on November 5th for their first regular season victory in their new home.

In 1973, the stadium was the first in the NFL to include arrows on the yard markers to indicate the nearer goal line. (Initially, they resembled little arrowheads.) This practice eventually spread to the other NFL stadiums during the 1970s, becoming mandatory league-wide for the 1978 season (after being used in Super Bowl XII), and became almost near-universal at lower levels of football.

On January 20, 1974, Arrowhead Stadium hosted the Pro Bowl. Due to an ice storm and brutally cold temperatures the week leading up to the game, the game's participants worked out at the facilities of the San Diego Chargers. On game day, the temperature soared to 41 °F (5 °C), melting most of the ice and snow that accumulated during the week. The AFC defeated the NFC, 15–13.

=== 1980s–present ===
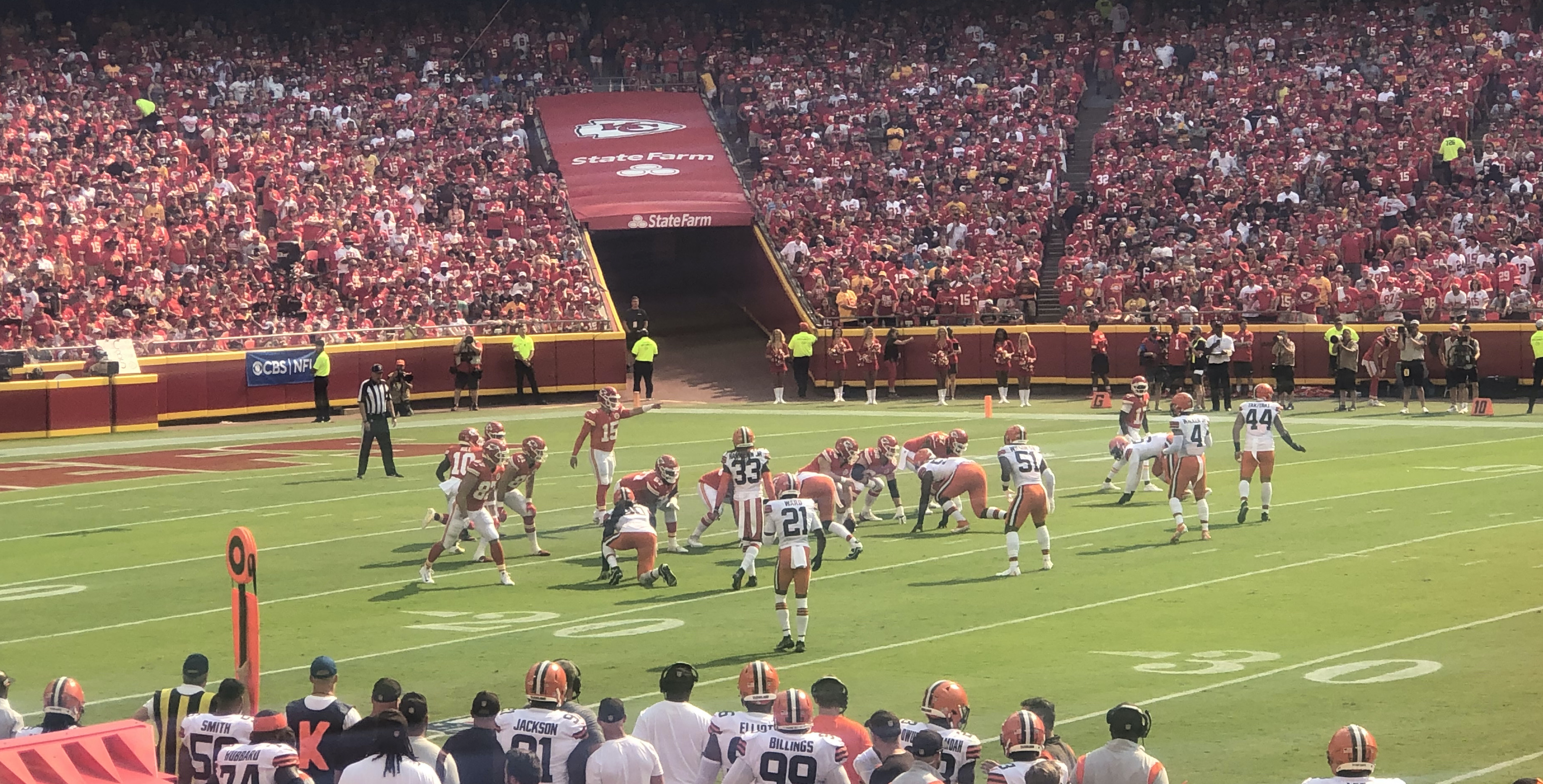
Patrick Mahomes leading the Chiefs offense against the Cleveland Browns, 2021.

In 1984, the Jackson County Sports Authority re-evaluated the concept of a fabric dome. The concept was disregarded as being unnecessary and financially impractical. Arrowhead hosted the Drum Corps International World Championships in 1988 and 1989.

In 1991, two Diamond Vision screens shaped as footballs were installed. In 1994, other improvements were made and natural grass playing surface was installed, replacing the original artificial AstroTurf playing field.

In 2009, Arrowhead Stadium completed the installation of a multimillion-dollar integrated system from Daktronics. Two high definition video displays were retrofitted into the existing football-shaped displays in both end zones. Approximately 1,625 feet (495 m) of digital ribbon board technology was also installed in the stadium.

In 2013, Arrowhead Stadium started using a new playing surface known as NorthBridge Bermudagrass. The reason the team made the switch was due to the cold weather tolerance, rapid recovery, and aggressive rooting.

A naming rights deal with GEHA, based in nearby Lee's Summit, resulted in the adoption of the alternative name GEHA Field at Arrowhead Stadium beginning March 2021. The agreement began at the start of the 2021 season and was slated to end in January 2031 with the expiration of the leases for the Chiefs and Royals with Truman Sports Complex owner, the Jackson County Sports Complex Authority.

Arrowhead Stadium was one of the hosts for the 2026 FIFA World Cup and it is scheduled to undergo small renovations in the years ahead. Seating capacity was reduced in the corners of the end zones to comply with FIFA field regulations. Space also had to be made for hospitality and media seating (outside of the stadium's already existing press box). The field also underwent improvement to its ventilation system. In February 2024, renovations were announced and showcased. The renovations were scheduled to begin in 2027 if an extension of a 3/8-cent sales tax from Jackson County, Missouri, voters was approved; however, the sales tax extension failed to pass.

On December 22, 2025, the team announced their intention to leave Arrowhead Stadium for a new stadium to be built in Wyandotte County, Kansas, scheduled to open in time for the 2031 NFL season and paving the way for Arrowhead Stadium to be demolished following the 2031 NFL season.

The original "Arrowhead Stadium" moniker was restored on August 5, 2026.

== Noise record ==
Since September 2014, Chiefs fans have been recognized by Guinness World Records as the loudest fan base in the world among outdoor stadiums.

In 1990 in a game against the Denver Broncos, the Chiefs were threatened with a penalty if the crowd would not quiet down. After John Elway was backed up to his own goal line and unable to even run a play he quickly spoke to referee Gordon McCarter. After listening to Elway, McCarter said "Any further crowd-noise problem will result in a charged timeout against Kansas City. Thank you for your cooperation."

On October 13, 2013, in a game between the Chiefs and Oakland Raiders, the crowd at the stadium set a Guinness World Record for the loudest stadium, with 137.5 dB. That record would be broken by Seattle Seahawks fans at CenturyLink Field on December 2, 2013, at a home game against the New Orleans Saints. Seattle gained the record by reaching a noise level of 137.6 decibels. The Chiefs reclaimed the title on September 29, 2014, in a Monday Night Football game against the New England Patriots, hitting 142.2 decibels.

== College football ==
Arrowhead Stadium has hosted five Big 12 Conference football championship games: Kansas State versus Oklahoma in 2000 and 2003, Colorado versus Oklahoma in 2004, Nebraska versus Oklahoma on December 2, 2006, and Missouri versus Oklahoma in 2008.

From 2007 to 2011, Arrowhead Stadium hosted the Border War between the Kansas Jayhawks and the Missouri Tigers. The 2007 game between the No. 2 Jayhawks and No. 3 Tigers, dubbed "Armageddon at Arrowhead" by media and fans, drew the second largest crowd in stadium history, at 80,537, with the Tigers winning 36–28. Kansas also played Oklahoma at Arrowhead in 2005. Missouri played Arkansas State in 2005 and BYU in 2015 as home games at Arrowhead. Missouri was scheduled to play Arkansas in 2020; however, the game location was changed to Columbia due to the COVID-19 pandemic.

In 2009 and 2010, Arrowhead Stadium hosted the annual "Farmageddon" game (a reference to the shared agricultural roots of the two competing schools) between the Iowa State Cyclones and the Kansas State Wildcats. Iowa State previously played at Arrowhead against the Florida State Seminoles in the 2002 Eddie Robinson Classic, while Kansas State played Cal in the 2003 Eddie Robinson Classic.

In 1998, Oklahoma State moved its scheduled home game vs. Nebraska to Arrowhead. The move was done to boost attendance and revenue: Lewis Field in Stillwater sat less than 50,000 fans at that time, the Huskers were the defending national champions, and with many Nebraska supporters living only a few hours' drive via Interstate 29 from Arrowhead, it made sense for a program which, at the time, was one of the Big XII's lesser teams.

The stadium also played host to the annual Fall Classic at Arrowhead, a Division II game that featured two nearby powerhouse programs in Northwest Missouri State University and Pittsburg State University. The 2004 game featured No. 1 Pittsburg State defeating No. 2 Northwest Missouri State in the only Division II game to feature the nation's top two teams playing in the regular season finale.

For the 2024 season, Kansas played four conference home games at the stadium due to renovations at their stadium.

Non-annual College Football games
Date	Winner	Loser	Score	Attendance
October 3, 1998	Nebraska	Oklahoma State	24–17	79,555
August 26, 2000	Kansas State	Iowa	27-7	77,148
August 24, 2002	Florida State	Iowa State	38–31	55,132
August 23, 2003	Kansas State	California	42–28	50,823
September 3, 2005	Missouri	Arkansas State	44–17	32,906
October 15, 2005	Oklahoma	Kansas	19–3	54,109
November 14, 2015	Missouri*	BYU	20–16	42,824
September 28, 2024	TCU	Kansas	38–27	47,928
October 19, 2024	Kansas	Houston	42–14	38,619
November 9, 2024	Kansas	Iowa State	45–36	51,109
November 23, 2024	Kansas	Colorado	37–21	56,470
August 28, 2025	Nebraska	Cincinnati	20–17	72,884

*Win vacated

== Soccer ==
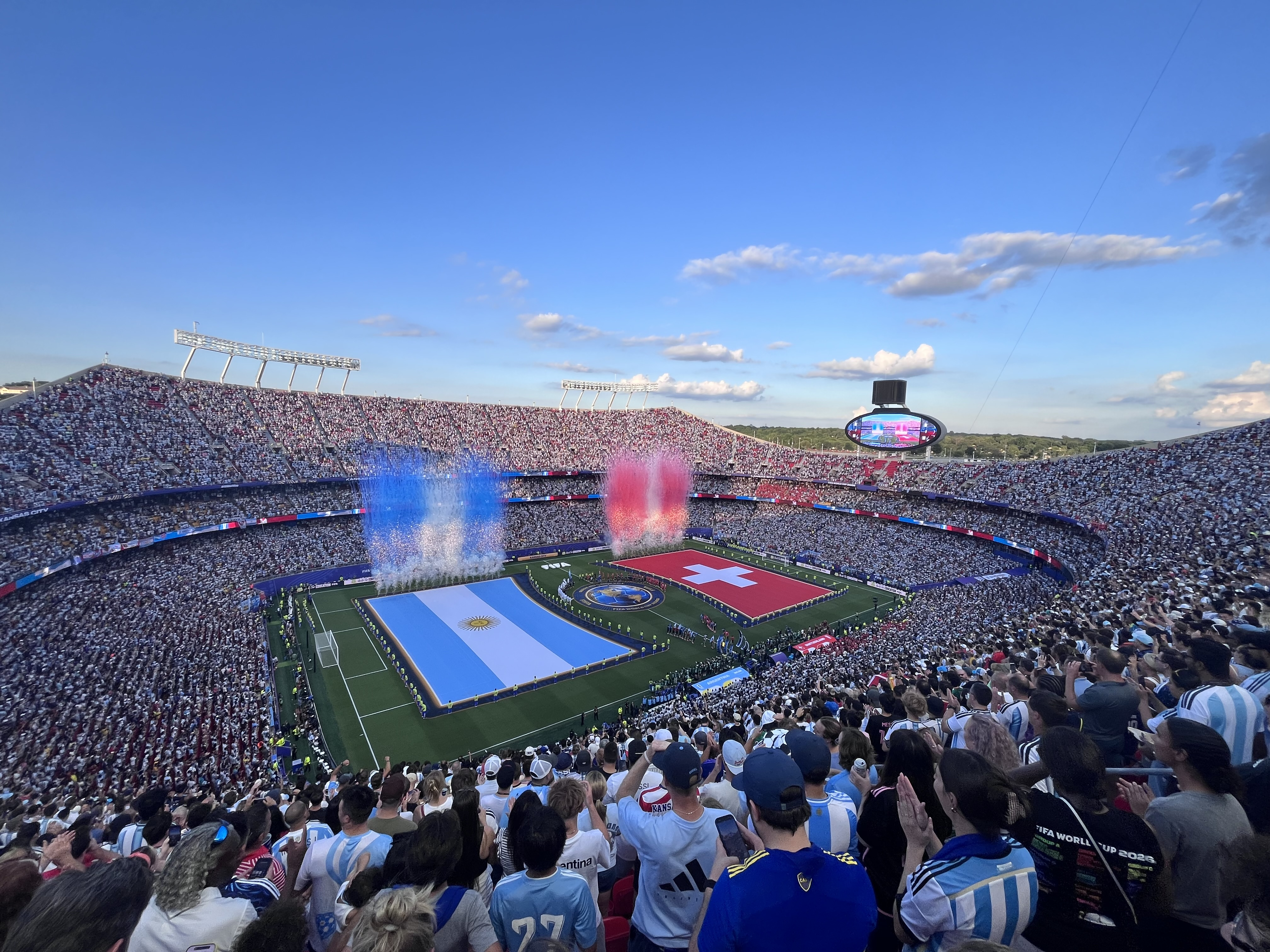
Argentina faces Switzerland in a 2026 FIFA World Cup quarterfinal match on July 11, 2026

With the formation of Major League Soccer in 1996, Arrowhead Stadium became home to the Kansas City Wiz, now known as Sporting Kansas City. After the 1996 season, the team was renamed the Wizards. They left after the 2007 season, after being sold by the Hunt Family to On Goal, LLC, once their lease ended. This was also beneficial so that construction work on Arrowhead Stadium's renovation could take place during the NFL off-season. The Wizards moved to CommunityAmerica Ballpark, now known as Legends Field, in 2008 and did not return to Arrowhead except for one friendly.

That friendly was played on July 25, 2010; the Wizards faced Manchester United at Arrowhead Stadium for the English team's third preseason friendly in America during 2011. Due to ticket demand, they could not play the game at their new home stadium, CommunityAmerica Ballpark. The match ended with Kansas City winning 2–1 with Dimitar Berbatov scoring the only goal for Manchester United on a penalty kick.

The stadium has hosted two US Men's National Team matches and three Women's National Team matches.

Arrowhead hosted MLS teams Sporting Kansas City and Inter Miami in a 2–3 victory for the latter on April 13, 2024, to accommodate for the large demand for tickets to see Inter Miami player Lionel Messi. It was Sporting's first game at the stadium since 2010 and attracted a crowd of 72,610, the fourth highest attended MLS event.

Date	Winning Team	Result	Losing Team	Game type	Attendance
October 7, 1999	United States	6–0	Finland	Women's International Friendly	36,405
August 20, 2000	United States	1–1	Canada	Women's International Friendly	21,246
April 25, 2001	United States	1–0	Costa Rica	2002 FIFA World Cup qualification – CONCACAF final round	37,319
October 22, 2003	United States	2–2	Italy	Women's International Friendly	18,263
October 16, 2004	United States	1–0	Mexico	Women's International Friendly	20,435
July 25, 2010	(United States) Kansas City Wizards	2–1	(England) Manchester United	Club Friendly	52,424
March 31, 2015	Mexico	1–0	Paraguay	International Friendly	38,114
April 13, 2024	(United States) Inter Miami CF	3–2	(United States) Sporting Kansas City	2024 MLS season	72,610
July 1, 2024	Uruguay	1–0	United States	2024 Copa América Group C	55,460

=== 2026 FIFA World Cup ===
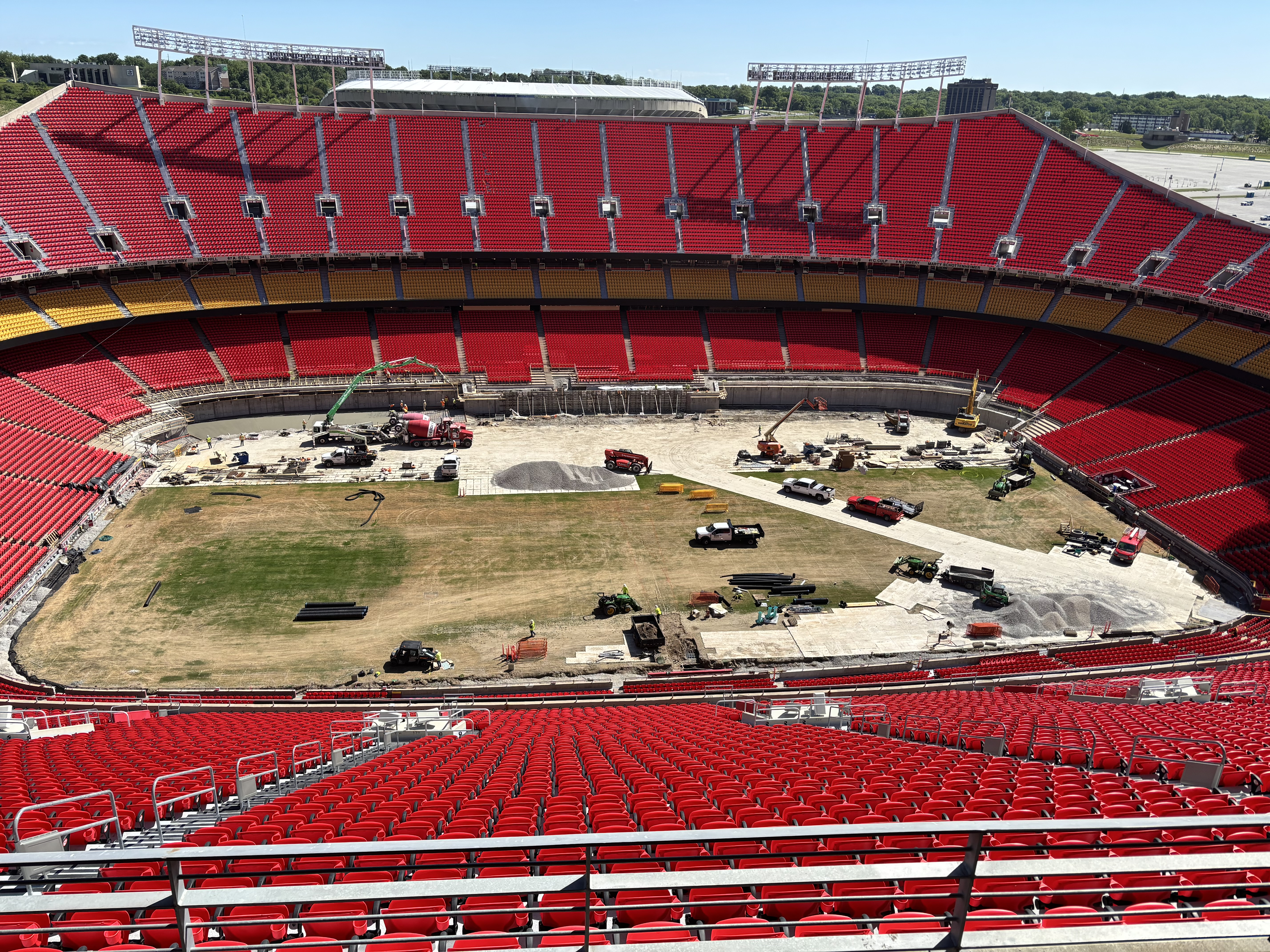
Arrowhead in May 2025 undergoing prep for the 2026 FIFA World Cup

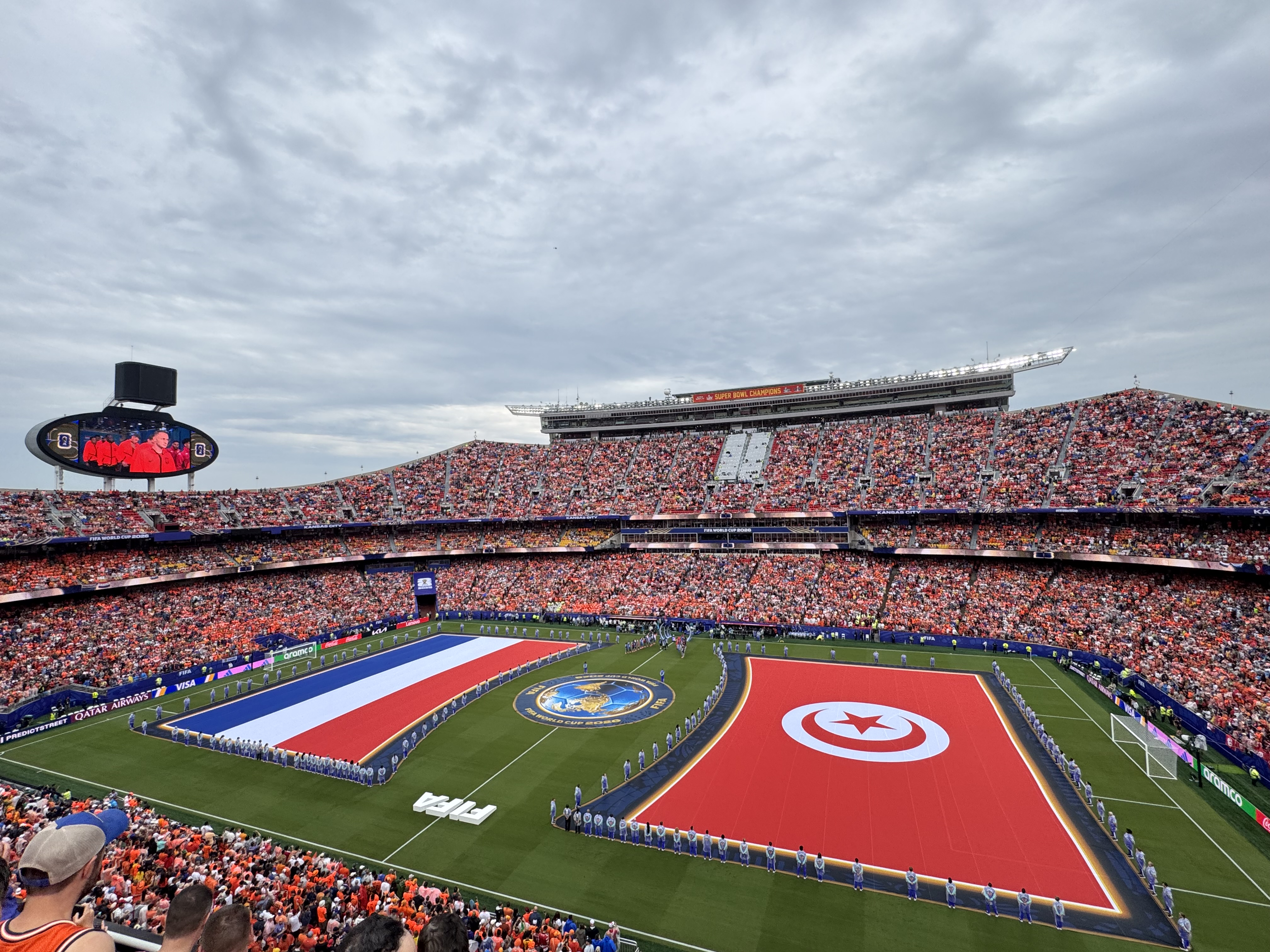
National anthems ceremony prior to the Netherlands vs Tunisia match of the 2026 FIFA World Cup

Arrowhead Stadium was chosen as one of the 16 venues to host games during the 2026 FIFA World Cup, which hosted jointly by the United States, Canada and Mexico. Due to FIFA protocol concerning stadium names, the stadium was temporarily named Kansas City Stadium. The stadium required renovations, with the field being expanded to FIFA regulations. Kansas City, Missouri mayor Quinton Lucas estimated the cost of the necessary renovations at $50 million. The stadium hosted six matches, including four group stage matches, one Round of 32 match, and one quarterfinal match.

Kansas City had some memorable moments during the World Cup. In the match between Argentina and Algeria, Lionel Messi scored the first hat trick of his World Cup career to lead Argentina to a 3-0 victory. Curaçao pulled out a surprising result to get a draw against a heavily favored Ecuador. The Netherlands took three points after defeating Tunisia in the group stage. Two stoppage time goals were scored in the match between Algeria and Austria, which allowed both teams to advance to the knockout round. Columbia knocked out Ghana in a round of 32 match, then Argentina advanced to the semifinal after two goals in extra time to defeat Switzerland.

Date	Time (UTC−5)	Team #1	Result	Team #2	Round	Attendance
June 16, 2026	20:00	Argentina	3–0	Algeria	Group J	69,045
June 20, 2026	19:00	Ecuador	0–0	Curaçao	Group E	68,598
June 25, 2026	18:00	Tunisia	1–3	Netherlands	Group F	68,391
June 27, 2026	21:00	Algeria	3–3	Austria	Group J	69,045
July 3, 2026	20:30	Colombia	1–0	Ghana	Round of 32	69,045
July 11, 2026	20:00	Argentina	3–1 (a.e.t.)	Switzerland	Quarterfinal	69,045

== Renovations ==
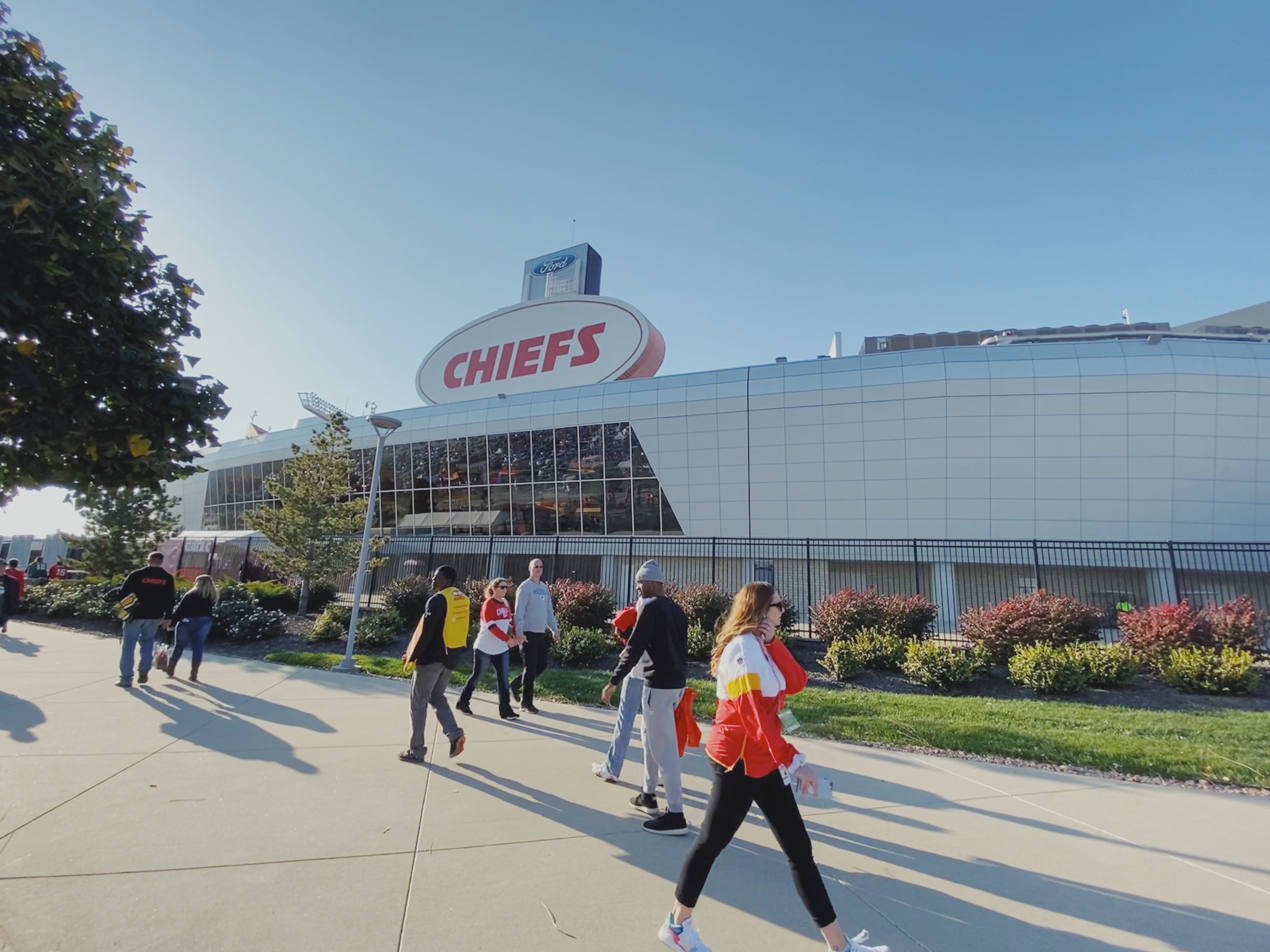
One of the entrances to the stadium.

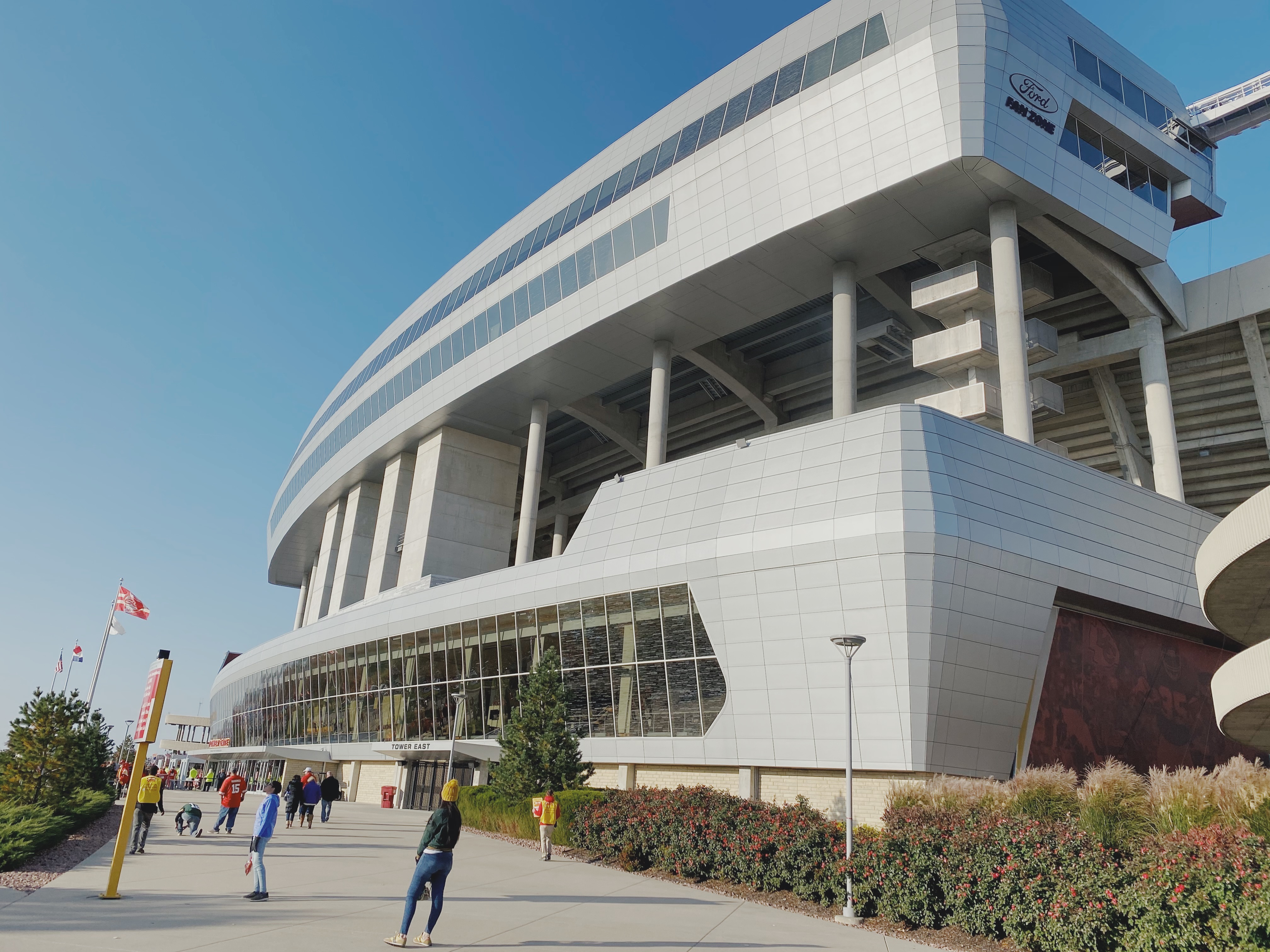
Rear view of the stadium

On April 4, 2006, Jackson County voters approved a tax increase to finance municipal bonds to pay for $850 million in renovations to Arrowhead Stadium and nearby Kauffman Stadium. Before the bond election, the NFL announced it would award hosting rights of a future Super Bowl to Kansas City provided it would have a climate-controlled stadium. With the passing of the stadium bill, the Chiefs signed a new lease which ensures that the team will remain at Arrowhead until at least 2031.

However, a second bond issue to build the rolling roof shared with Kauffman Stadium that was part of the original 1967 stadium plan was defeated by voters, and Kansas City chose to withdraw its request to host Super Bowl XLIX in 2015; the game was played at the University of Phoenix Stadium (now State Farm Stadium) in Glendale, Arizona.

On August 15, 2007, the Chiefs announced final plans for the renovated Arrowhead Stadium, which would cost $375 million. The cost to the city was reduced by $50 million thanks to an additional payment by the Hunt family, which originally had intended to donate $75 million. The renovated stadium features the Chiefs Hall of Honor, a tribute to Lamar Hunt, and "horizon level" seating in which luxury suite owners sit outdoors.

Reconstruction for the stadiums started on October 3, 2007. Refurbishment of nearby Kauffman Stadium, home to the Kansas City Royals baseball team, commenced at that time, and both completely-refurbished stadiums were ready for play by the 2010 season.

In 2019, the Chiefs announced multiple renovations for the 2020 season, which included replaced seats in the lower level, a new video display on the East end, and locker room upgrades.

In February 2024, the Chiefs announced additional plans to renovate the stadium starting in 2027, which would further increase the seating capacity along with other upgrades; however, those plans were shelved in April when voters rejected a 40-year sales tax increase to help fund the project.

The stadium was renovated in 2025, to allow space for a full sized FIFA soccer field for the 2026 FIFA World Cup.

== Stadium music ==
From 1963 to 2008, the TD Pack Band was a mainstay at every Chiefs home game. The band was founded by trumpeter Tony DiPardo. The band was previously known as The Zing Band while the Chiefs played at Municipal Stadium. DiPardo, nicknamed "Mr. Music", was born in St. Louis, Missouri on August 15, 1912. DiPardo wrote songs about the team such as "The Chiefs are on the Warpath" and "The Hank Stram Polka". DiPardo received a Super Bowl ring for the Chiefs' victory in Super Bowl IV. DiPardo died in 2011.

== Concerts ==
On September 8, 2018, Taylor Swift hosted a show from her Reputation Stadium Tour, followed two nights of her signature Eras Tour at the stadium on July 7–8, 2023. On October 1, 2023, Beyoncé performed at the stadium and concluded her Renaissance World Tour. At the end of the show, she premiered the teaser for Renaissance: A Film by Beyoncé.

== Transportation ==
The Truman Sports Complex has 26,000 total parking spaces that are shared between the two stadiums. Arrowhead Stadium is served by a single bus route operated by the Kansas City Area Transportation Authority. During the 2026 World Cup, several express buses connected the stadium to destinations around the Kansas City area, including the fan festival at the National World War I Museum and Memorial in downtown.

== See also ==
- Lists of stadiums
- New Chiefs Stadium – The Chiefs' planned new stadium in Kansas City, Kansas
- Sports in the Kansas City metropolitan area

Events and tenants
Preceded by Municipal Stadium	Home of the Kansas City Chiefs; 1972 – present	Succeeded by New Chiefs Stadium
Preceded by first stadium	Home of the Kansas City Wizards; 1996 – 2007	Succeeded by CommunityAmerica Ballpark
Preceded by Texas Stadium	Host of the NFL Pro Bowl; 1974	Succeeded by Miami Orange Bowl
Preceded by Gillette Stadium; M&T Bank Stadium	Host of the AFC Championship Game; 2019 – 2023; 2025	Succeeded by M&T Bank Stadium; Empower Field at Mile High
Preceded by Alamodome; Reliant Stadium; Reliant Stadium; Alamodome	Home of the Big 12 Championship Game; 2000; 2003 – 2004; 2006; 2008	Succeeded by Texas Stadium; Reliant Stadium; Alamodome; Cowboys Stadium
Preceded by Camp Randall Stadium	Host of the Drum Corps International; World Championship; 1988 – 1989	Succeeded by Rich Stadium
