= New Chiefs Stadium =

Future stadium in Kansas City, Kansas

- Location: Kansas City, Kansas, U.S.
- Owner: State of Kansas
- Capacity: 70,000
- Type: Multi-purpose stadium
- Events: American football; concerts
- Roof: Skylight

Construction
- Opened: 2031; 5 years' time (planned)
- Cost: $3 billion
- Architects: Manica; HNTB

Tenant
- Kansas City Chiefs (c. 2031)

Website
- chiefs.com/new-stadium/

New Chiefs Stadium is the project name for an indoor stadium in Kansas City, Kansas, U.S., scheduled to open in 2031. The stadium will serve as the home venue of the National Football League (NFL) team Kansas City Chiefs and host other sports and public events. The stadium was announced in December 2025 and will cost $3 billion. The stadium will be the team's third to be located in the Kansas City metropolitan area, following Municipal Stadium and Arrowhead Stadium.

== Design ==
The stadium will be designed by Manica alongside HNTB and features a skylight roof. The stadium's seating bowl with 70,000 seats is purposefully designed to be reminiscent of Arrowhead Stadium, featuring a drum deck and the team's Ring of Honor. Renderings of the stadium were released in July 2026. Chiefs team president Mark Donovan said in July 2026 that the team's "preference is grass" for the stadium surface by relying on the translucent roof, but the stadium design has options for artificial turf or a hybrid surface.

Preceded by Arrowhead Stadium	Home of the Kansas City Chiefs; 2031 (planned)	Succeeded by none
