= Enoch Needles =

American civil engineer (1888–1972)

Enoch Ray Needles
- Born: October 29, 1888; Brookfield, Missouri U.S.
- Died: January 5, 1972 (aged 83); Morristown, New Jersey, U.S.
- Education: Missouri School of Mines and Metallurgy (BS, CE)
- Spouse: Ethel Schuman (m. 1916)
- Children: 6
- Military career
- Branch: United States Army
- Service years: 1942–1945
- Rank: Colonel
- Conflict: World War II
- Awards: Legion of Merit

Enoch Ray Needles (October 29, 1888 – January 5, 1972) was an American civil engineer and a founding partner in the firm that became Howard, Needles, Tammen & Bergendoff (now known as HNTB). Born and educated in Missouri, he relocated to the East Coast in 1922 to open up the firm's New York City office. After World War II, Needles became involved with the design, construction and financing of transportation infrastructure—primarily toll roads—and helped with the passage of the Federal-Aid Highway Act of 1956. He served as the president of four major professional organizations, including the American Institute of Consulting Engineers, American Road Builders' Association, American Society of Civil Engineers, and Engineers Joint Council.

== Early life and education ==
Enoch Ray Needles was born on October 29, 1888 in Brookfield, Missouri to Simgesmer Needles and Elma Florence Needles (née Bray). He was one of nine children in the family, which had relocated to Kansas City, Missouri by the time Enoch was 12 years old. After attending Central High School in Kansas City, he went to college at the Missouri School of Mines and Metallurgy, where he earned a bachelor of science degree in 1914.

== Career ==
From 1906 until 1914—before he completed college—Needles did part-time surveying and inspection work for the Kansas City Park and Boulevard System. From 1914 to 1915, he worked on railroad appraisals and surveys of mines. Needles then worked for the Kansas City Terminal Railway for the next two years, first working as an engineering draftsman in the track department followed by work in the bridge department.

In 1917, Needles began working with the firm of Harrington, Howard & Ash in Kansas City. After initially working in the office, his first major assignment involved serving as the resident engineer for the bridge over the St. Johns River in Jacksonville, Florida. He earned a civil engineer degree from the School of Mines in 1920, writing his thesis on the St. Johns River Bridge. Needles moved to the East Coast in 1922, where he opened up the New York City office of the firm located at 55 Liberty Street. He became a partner in Ash, Howard, Needles & Tammen in 1928, when the original firm was split into two separate companies. (Note: The name of the firm was changed to Howard, Needles, Tammen & Bergendoff in 1941, the year after Ruben N. Bergendoff became a partner. In 1993, it was changed to HNTB Corp. when the partnership was changed to a corporation.)

During the early part of his career, the firm was involved with the design of several bridges in New York and New Jersey including: the Burlington–Bristol Bridge, the Edison Bridge, Ocean Highway bridges in Cape May County, the Pulaski Skyway, and the Triborough Bridge's spans across the Harlem River and Bronx Kill. The firm was also involved with several bridges across the Mississippi River including the Benjamin G. Humphreys Bridge, the Julien Dubuque Bridge, the Natchez–Vidalia Bridge and the Rock Island Centennial Bridge. Needles delivered the commencement address at his alma mater in 1937, when he was awarded an honorary degree of doctor of engineering.

Needles was involved with the development of the Southwestern Proving Ground in Arkansas and the Bluebonnet Ordnance Plant in Texas in 1941 and 1942, respectively. During World War II, he served in the United States Army Corps of Engineers from 1942 to 1945; Needles was the chief of the Redistribution and Salvage Division in the Office of Special Assignment. He attained the rank of colonel and was awarded the Legion of Merit.

After the war, Needles became involved with the design, construction and financing of transportation infrastructure projects, including the Delaware Memorial Bridge and the New Jersey Turnpike; he served as the first engineering advisor to the New Jersey Turnpike Authority. He was also involved with the development of the Delaware, Maine, Massachusetts, and West Virginia turnpikes. Considered to be an authority on toll roads, Needles testified before Congress and helped with the passage of the Federal-Aid Highway Act of 1956. He retired in 1963.

== Professional societies ==
Needles was elected as the president of the four major professional organizations: the American Institute of Consulting Engineers (1946); the American Road Builders' Association (1949); the American Society of Civil Engineers (1955); and the Engineers Joint Council (1958). He also was a member of the Engineers' Council for Professional Development, National Society of Professional Engineers, Newcomen Society, and Society of American Military Engineers.

== Personal life and death ==
He married Ethel Schuman on September 12, 1916 in Rolla, Missouri. The couple had six children. After Needles' job brought him from the Midwest to the East Coast, they lived in Elizabeth, New Jersey before settling in Summit, New Jersey in the mid-1930s.

Needles enjoyed golf and was a member of the Canoe Brook Country Club in New Jersey. He also was a member of the Engineers' Club of New York City. Needles died on January 5, 1972 at Morristown Memorial Hospital.
