= VTB Arena =

Sports complex in Moscow

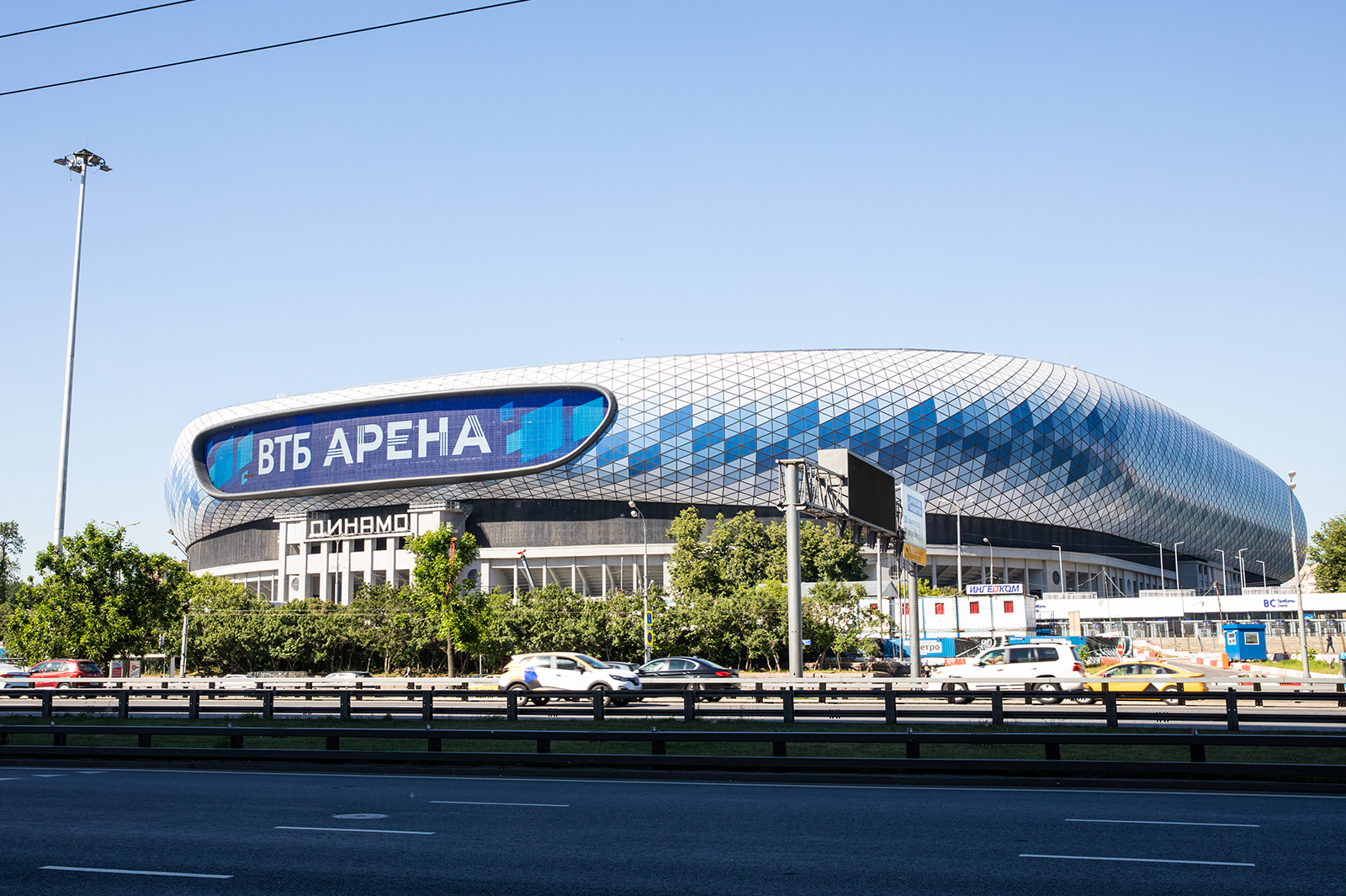
- Interactive map of VTB Arena
- Address: 36 Leningradsky avenue Moscow; Russia
- Coordinates: 55°47′29″N 37°33′35″E
- Elevation: Central Stadium: 55 m (180 ft): (Floor count; 6); Universal Arena: 35 m (115 ft): (Floor count; 6)
- Owner: BM-Bank JSC
- Operator: VTB Arena LLC
- Capacity: Central Stadium; 33 000 (max); Detailed capacity: Football: 25 716; Concert : 33 000; Universal Arena; 14 000 (max); Detailed capacity: Ice Hockey: 10 721; Basketball 1: 12 273; Basketball 2: 9 800; Concert : 14 000
- Type: Sports and concert and entertainment complex
- Field size: Football field 105×70m Ice rink 60x26m
- Acreage: 206,210 sq.m land plot is 23.1 he
- Public transit: Dinamo; Petrovsky Park
- Parking: ~700 cars

Construction
- Built: March 2014 – 27 November 2018
- Opened: Central Stadium: 26 May 2019; 7 years ago Universal Arena: 4 January 2019; 7 years ago
- Cost: ₽ 26 billion (€ 350,9 million in 2018); Central Stadium: ₽ 9 billion (€ 121,5 million in 2018)
- Architects: Erick van Egeraat; Mikhail M. Posokhin of Mosproject-2; David Manica of MANICA Architecture; SPEECH; ABD architects
- Builder: VTB Bank
- Project manager: CJSC Dynamo Management Company
- General contractor: Codest International S.r.L.
- Main contractor: FPC Satori LLC

Tenants
- FC Dynamo Moscow (2019 – present); HC Dynamo Moscow (2019 – present)

Website
- vtb-arena.com/en/

The VTB Arena, officiallt the Dynamo Central Stadium "Lev Yashin", is a multi-purpose sports complex in Moscow, Russia. It consists of an ice hockey arena and an association football venue. The ice hockey venue is known as the Universal VTB Arena.

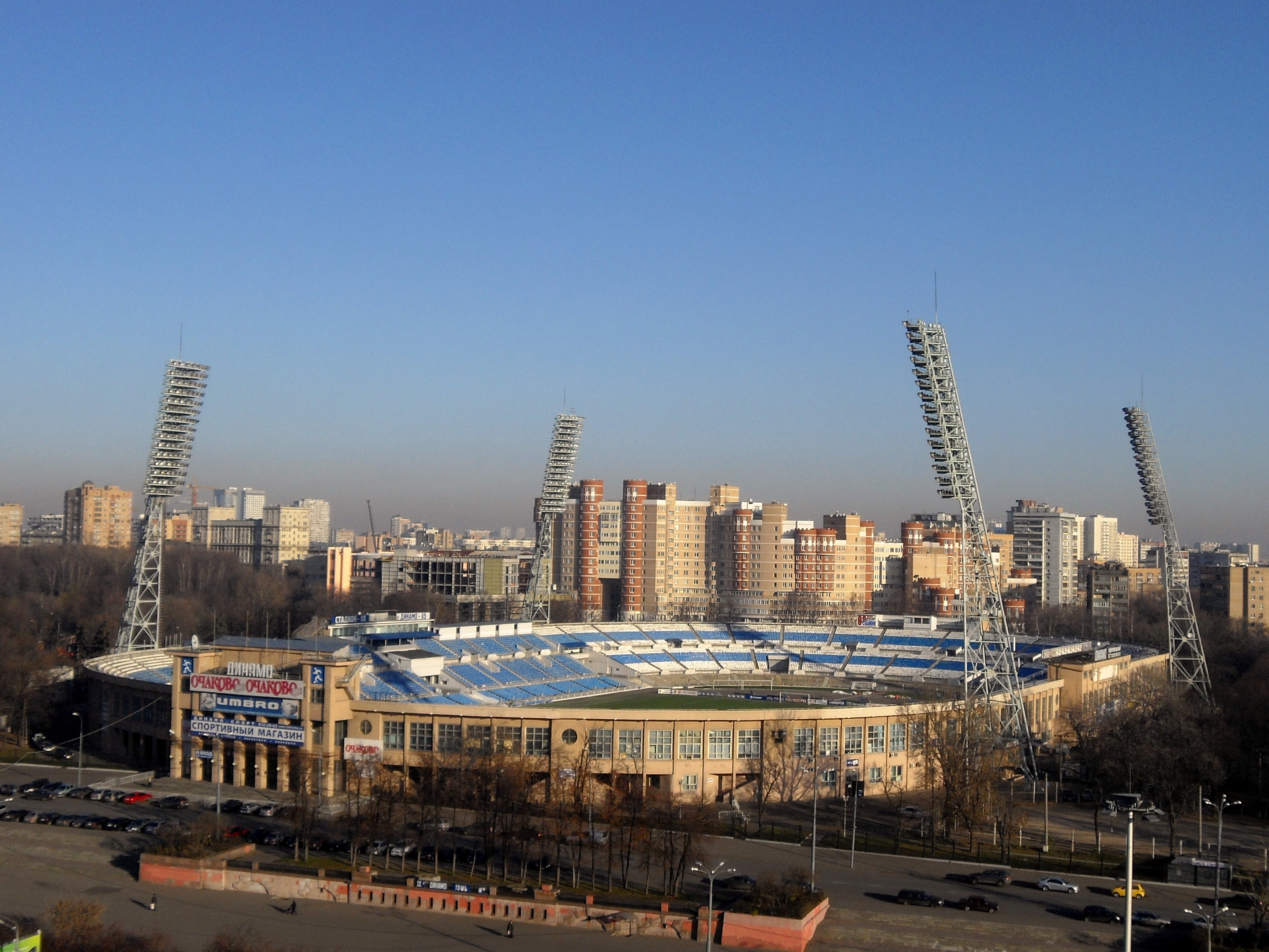
Dynamo Stadium in 2008

== History ==
The old Central Dynamo Stadium was closed for demolition in 2008, and the new VTB Arena was built in its place. The final design of the new stadium was done by David Manica of MANICA Architecture, and the construction was originally scheduled to be finished in 2016 and then 2017, but continued into 2018. The project is called VTB Arena, even though VTB Bank attempted to sell the naming rights. The football stadium has the capacity of 27,000, that can be adjusted up to 45,000, or down to an undisclosed number, while the indoor arena has a base capacity of 12,273.

At the end of 2020, a facial recognition system was installed at the stadium to keep unwanted fans out. It was also expected that biometrics will replace tickets in the future.

On results of 2020 the football stadium and ice arena became the winners of the IV Sport Business Awards.

=== Design ===
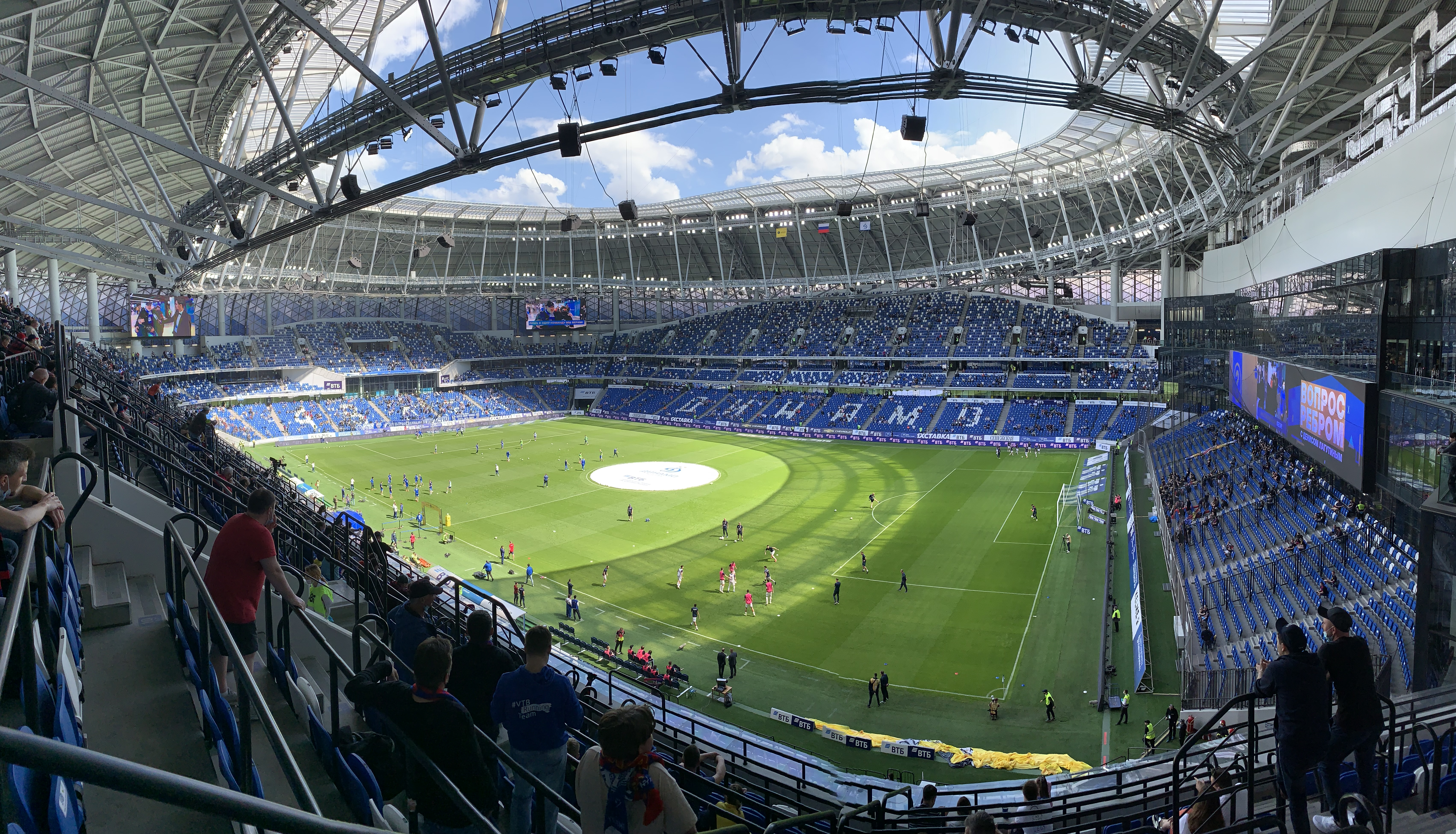
Central stadium “Dynamo” named after Lev Yashin

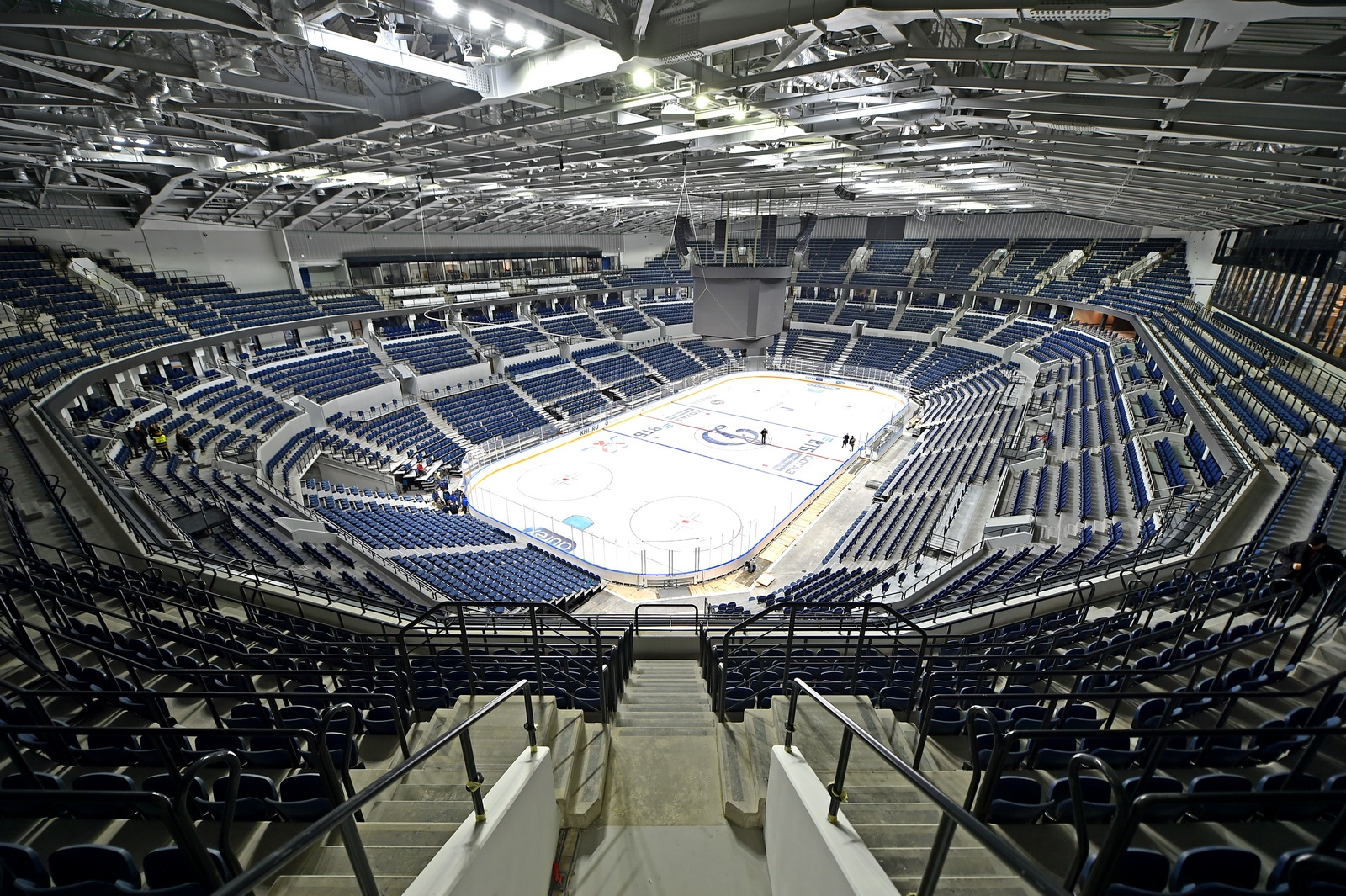
Multifunctional VTB Arena

The VTB Arena's initial concept was drawn by Dutch architect Erick van Egeraat, who does designs mainly for buildings in Russia and Germany. His vision of comprising both a football stadium and an ice hockey arena inside the bowl of the former Dynamo Stadion won the authorities' approval. Other architects who submitted their projects for tender, but lost out on the final bid, included Perkins Eastman, Populous, and Gerkan, Marg and Partners. However, some of the elements from the losing bids were used in the final design.

The final design was prepared by the American firm MANICA Architecture.

=== Concerts ===
On 27 December 2017, the first event was officially confirmed for the stadium, a concert by Imagine Dragons on 29 August 2018 as part of their Evolve World Tour. In June 2018, the show was moved to Luzhniki Stadium because VTB Arena was not completed by the expected date. The stadium received official permit for use on 27 November 2018 and the first event booked was a figure skating adaptation of the "Swan Lake" by Evgeni Plushenko on 20 December 2018.

Many events were booked for 2019 following the opening: concerts by Twenty One Pilots, Dima Bilan, Manowar, Hollywood Undead, Splean and Disturbed as well as the Walking with Dinosaurs show at the indoor arena and concerts by Kiss (End of the Road World Tour), Rammstein (Europe Stadium Tour 2019, later moved to the higher-capacity Luzhniki Stadium after tickets were quickly sold out) and Max Korzh at the outdoor stadium. Other 2019 concerts booked at the arena were The Chemical Brothers, Christina Aguilera (The X Tour), Bi-2, Scorpions (Crazy World Tour), Mumiy Troll, Zveri, LOBODA and Sergey Lazarev at the indoor arena and Jennifer Lopez (It's My Party Tour) at the outdoor stadium. The concerts booked for 2020 included Chaif, The World of Hans Zimmer symphonic show, Diana Arbenina and Novoye Radio awards show feat. Basta, Ruki Vverh! and Little Big (all indoors). Due to the COVID-19 pandemic in Russia, 2020 bookings were limited. The concerts booked for 2021 included shows by Aerosmith, Bi-2, and Twenty One Pilots at the outdoor stadium and Powerwolf, LSP, Kasta, Kino, Aria, Artik & Asti, Enrique Iglesias, Korn, Diana Arbenina, and Pavel Volya at the indoor arena. Due to continuing waves of the COVID-19 pandemic, several 2021 shows were cancelled or rescheduled for 2022. Concerts booked for 2022 included rescheduled shows by Iron Maiden, Aerosmith, Enrique Iglesias, Powerwolf and Korn. Most of the 2022 shows were cancelled following the Russian invasion of Ukraine.

2024 concerts include mostly performances by local acts, including Kino, Anton Belyaev, Dima Bilan, Egor Kreed, Kipelov, Knyazz, The Hatters and Markul.

=== Football stadium ===
On 27 November 2018, the arena confirmed that the first football game after reopening was to be played between Dynamo Moscow and Spartak Moscow (see Oldest Russian derby), initially scheduled for 10 March 2019. However, on 28 February 2019, the Russian Premier League announced that its inspectors did not find the pitch acceptable for play, and the derby was moved to a backup stadium. As a result, the pitch was reinstalled from scratch. On 16 May 2019, the league approved the new pitch for use and announced that the first game at the stadium played by Dynamo would be the closing game of the 2018–19 Russian Premier League season against Arsenal Tula on 26 May, which ended a 3–3 draw, in front of 23,340.

=== 2018 FIFA World Cup bid ===
The VTB Arena's new football stadium was included in the successful Russian bid to host the 2018 FIFA World Cup. In late September 2012 FIFA announced the list of host cities and venues, which excluded VTB Arena from the host list.

=== Hockey arena ===
Ice hockey club HC Dynamo Moscow played their first game at the arena (named Arkady Chernyshev Arena for hockey games) on 4 January 2019 against Avtomobilist Yekaterinburg, winning 2–0 with attendance of 10,797. On 17 February 2019, the arena hosted the VTB United League allstar game.

=== 2019 EuroLeague Final Four ===
The VTB Arena's new indoor arena was reported to be chosen to host the basketball EuroLeague's final competition stage, the EuroLeague Final Four, in 2019. However, EuroLeague Basketball did not confirm this report, and the tournament was in fact awarded to Fernando Buesa Arena in Vitoria-Gasteiz, Spain.

== See also ==
- List of football stadiums in Russia
- List of indoor arenas in Russia
- List of European ice hockey arenas
