= Manica Architecture =

American architectural firm

Manica
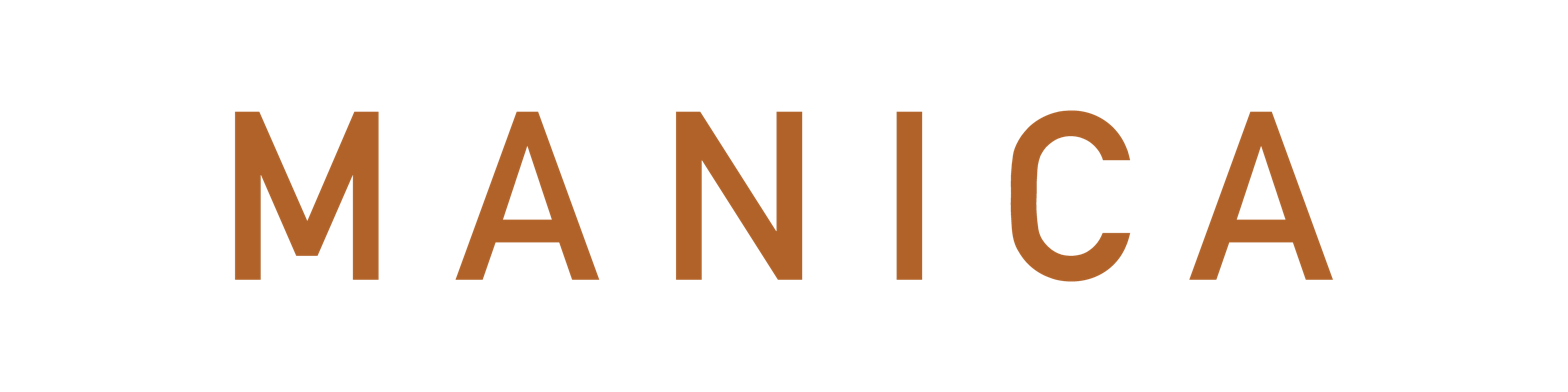
- Industry: Architecture
- Founded: 2007
- Number of locations: Kansas City, Kansas, U.S. London, England
- Services: Sports stadium and entertainment venue design
- Owner: David Manica
- Website: manica.global

Manica is an American architectural firm. The firm was formed in 2007 by David Manica in Kansas City, Kansas. They have designed several sports and entertainment facilities such as Allegiant Stadium.

== Projects ==
Manica has designed several sports and entertainment facilities such as:

- Allegiant Stadium in Las Vegas
- Chase Stadium in Fort Lauderdale
- Chase Center in San Francisco
- Continental Coliseum in Oklahoma City
- New Chiefs Stadium in Kansas City, Kansas
- Nissan Stadium in Nashville
- Lusail Iconic Stadium in Doha, Qatar
- VTB Arena in Moscow, Russia
